= AC Legnano =

Italian football club

Legnano
- Full name: Associazione Calcio Dilettantistica Legnano S.r.l.
- Nickname: I Lilla (The Lilacs)
- Founded: 1913; 2011 (refounded)
- Stadium: Stadio Giovanni Mari
- Capacity: 5,000
- President: Sergio Zoppi
- Head coach: Michele Ferri
- League: Eccellenza Lombardia
- 2022–23: Serie D Group A, 6th of 20
- Website: aclegnano.it
Home colours	Away colours

Associazione Calcio Dilettantistica Legnano, commonly referred to as Legnano, is an Italian football club based in Legnano, Lombardy. Founded in 1913, Legnano played three seasons in Serie A and a total of eleven seasons in the top tier of the Italian football league system.

Legnano's most recent appearance in Serie A dates back to 1954, whereas in 1957 the club took part for the last time – to date – in a Serie B championship (the second tier of Italian football). Since then the club have played at their highest at the third tier of the Italian league.

The team's colours are lilac and white. After financial struggles and bankruptcy in 2010 the club folded and reformed in 2011 as ASD Legnano Calcio 1913; in 2015 they regained the right to name themselves ACD Legnano Calcio and to merge their history with that of the 97-year-old club which had previously folded.

== History ==
=== Foundation ===
The club were founded in 1913 as Football Club Legnano.

Several notable players appeared for Legnano in its early years. Goalkeeper Angelo Cameroni was called up to the Italy national side in 1920; he was the first Legnano player to achieve this. Luigi Allemandi played four seasons with the club from 1921 onwards, until he was bought by Italian giants Juventus. He later won the World Cup with Italy at the 1934 FIFA World Cup.

=== Serie A: Club at their peak ===
Legnano first gained access to Serie A for the 1930–31 season; the previous year they had finished as runners up in Serie B. The first match at the top level of Italian football was the shocking 2–1 defeat of Italy's oldest club, Genoa C.F.C.

Unfortunately for Legnano, they finished at the bottom of the table that season and were relegated; other notable results however were a 1–1 draw with eventual runners up A.S. Roma, and a 2–1 defeat of S.S.C. Napoli in Naples.

In the 1935–1936 season, the club changed their name to Associazione Calcio Legnano.

Left-winger Emilio Caprile was called up by the azzurri, to play in two international games during 1948. He became the first Legnano player to score for Italy with a goal in each match.

=== Slide down the Italian league ===
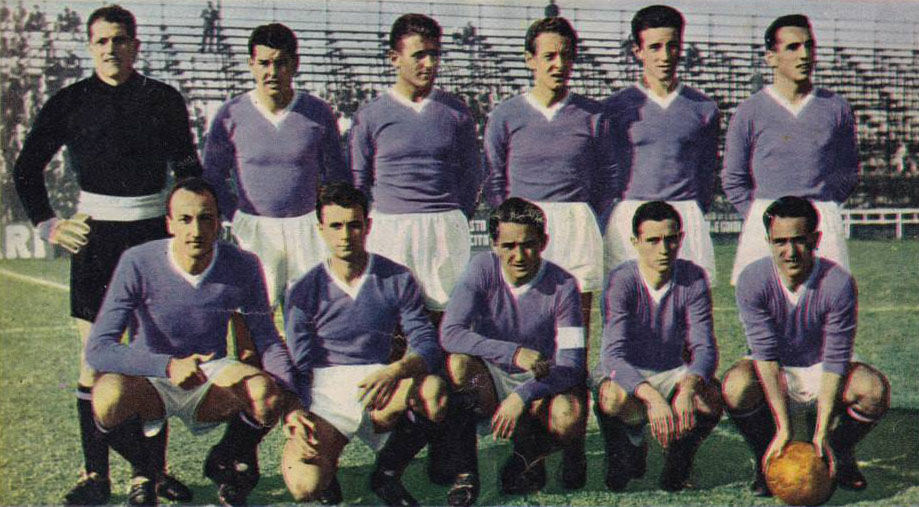
1956–57 Legnano

After their last relegation from Serie A in 1953–54, the club have gradually declined. First they came close to promotion to the league with a 3rd position in B, but two years later they were relegated to Serie C.

Legnano spent 18 consecutive seasons competing in Serie C, able to finish as high as 5th 3 successive seasons. 1974–75 saw the club slump to Serie D; this was soon rectified as coach Luciano Sassi pulled the club into Serie C2 with a runner up spot in 1977–78.

=== Giovanni Mari lifts Legnano ===
Giovanni Mari took over as club president in 1979 and under him, Legnano would achieve the championship of Serie C2. A.C. Legnano had last finished in first position in any league in 1919. The club's stadium was renamed Stadio Giovanni Mari in his honour.

=== The refoundation ===
Following bankruptcy in 2010, Legnano would fold.

It was refounded on 15 July 2011, as A.S.D. Legnano Calcio 1913 and was admitted to Group N of Prima Categoria Lombardy in the 2011–12 season. The club was promoted to Group A of Promozione Lombardy.

The club had a second successive promotion after finishing as champions of Group A of Promozione Lombardy next season and was promoted to Group A of Eccellenza Lombardy.

On 7 May 2015, A.S.D. Legnano Calcio 1913 re-acquired the name Associazione Calcio Legnano. They finished Eccellenza Lombardy as 4th in 2014–15 but were eliminated in the play-offs. They finished Group A of Eccellanza Lombardy as 2nd and were qualified for the play-offs again. They defeated Torviscosa with 4–1 aggregate in semifinal and Sankt Georgen with 4–3 aggregate in final and were promoted to Serie D.

== Players ==
=== Notable former players ===
- (Italy) Luigi Allemandi
- (Argentina) (Italy) Attilio Demaría
- (Italy) Gigi Riva
- (France) Nicholas Frey
- (France) Pedro Kamata
- (Sweden) Karl-Erik Palmér
- (Italy) Paolo Pulici
- (Italy) Davide Fontolan
- (Netherlands) Chedric Seedorf
- (Italy) Marco Simone
- (Germany) Hermann Lindemann

== Staff ==
=== Presidential history ===
Over the years Legnano has had various owners, chairmen or presidential figures; here is a chronological list of the presidents;

- 1913–1916 (Italy) Aldo Visconti and Eugenio Tosi (honorary president)
- 1917–1924 (Italy) Antonio Bernocchi
- 1924–1925 (Italy) Carlo Delle Piane
- 1925–1927 (Italy) Ernesto Castiglioni
- 1927–1929 (Italy) Antonio Bernocchi
- 1929–1931 (Italy) Giuseppe Mario Perozzi, Mario Raimondo and Riccardo Pezzoni (board of regents)
- 1931–1933 (Italy) Ernesto Castiglioni
- 1933–1934 (Italy) Primo Colombo (extraordinary commissioner)
- 1934–1945 (Italy) Giulio Riva
- 1945–1952 (Italy) Pino Mocchetti
- 1952–1953 (Italy) Luigi Mandelli (extraordinary commissioner), following Giovanni Mari
- 1953–1954 (Italy) Giovanni Mari
- 1954–1956 (Italy) Giuseppe Mario Perozzi (extraordinary commissioner)
- 1956–1959 (Italy) Davide Casero (extraordinary commissioner)
- 1959–1963 (Italy) Luciano Caccia
- 1963–1964 (Italy) Felice Bossi (extraordinary commissioner)
- 1964–1975 (Italy) Augusto Terreni
- 1975–1979 (Italy) Rolando Landoni (extraordinary commissioner)
- 1979–1986 (Italy) Giovanni Mari
- 1986 (Italy) Ulrico Lucarelli
- 1986–1987 (Italy) Giovanni Mari
- 1987–1996 (Italy) Ferdinando Villa
- 1996–1999 (Italy) Mario Pighetti
- 1999 (Italy) Mauro Rusignolo
- 1999–2002 (Italy) Mauro Rusignolo
- 2002–2005 (Italy) Antonio Di Bari
- 2005–2007 (Italy) Giovanni Simone
- 2007–2009 (Italy) Giuseppe Resta
- 2009–2010 (Italy) Giacomo Tarabbia
- 2010 (Italy) Alessio Fiore
- 2011–2015 (Italy) Nicolò Zanda
- 2015 (Italy) Salvatore Verdoliva
- 2015–incumbent (Italy) Vanessa Paolillo

=== Managerial history ===
Below is a list of AC Legnano coaches from 1913 until the present day:

- 1913–1914 (Italy) Adamo Bonacina
- 1914–1915 (Italy) Pariani
- 1915–1916 (Italy) Primo Colombo
- 1916–1917 (Italy) Primo Colombo
  (Italy) Nino Resegotti
- 1917–1919 Technical Committee: (Italy) Primo Colombo, (Italy) Adamo Bonacina and (Italy) Giuseppe Venegoni
- 1919–1923 (Italy) Primo Colombo
- 1923–1925 (Hungary) Imre Schöffer
- 1925–1927 (Italy) Primo Colombo
- 1927–1928 (Hungary) Imre Schöffer
- 1928–1929 (Hungary) Armand Halmos
- 1929–1931 (Italy) Luigi Barbesino
- 1931–1933 (Hungary) Otto Krappan
- 1933–1934 (Italy) Francesco Lattuada
  (Italy) Vinicio Colombo
- 1934–1935 (Italy) Vinicio Colombo
- 1935–1936 (Italy) Enrico Crotti
- 1936–1945 (Italy) Enrico Crotti
- 1945–1946 (Italy) Attilio Demaria
- 1946–1947 (Hungary) Róbert Winkler
- 1947–1949 (Italy) Giuseppe Galluzzi
- 1949–1950 (Italy) Ugo Innocenti
- 1950–1951 (Italy) Ugo Innocenti and (Uruguay) (Italy) Héctor Puricelli
- 1951–1952 (Uruguay) (Italy) Héctor Puricelli
- 1952–1953 (Italy) Ugo Innocenti
  (Uruguay) (Italy) Héctor Puricelli
- 1953–1954 (Italy) Giuseppe Galluzzi
- 1954–1957 (Italy) Ugo Innocenti
- 1957–1959 (Italy) Mario Zidarich
- 1959–1960 (Italy) Renato Picentini
- 1960–1962 (Italy) Giuseppe Molina
- 1962–1963 (Italy) Luciano Lupi
- 1963–1964 (Italy) Fausto Braga
- 1964–1967 (Italy) Luciano Lupi
- 1967–1968 (Italy) Carlo Facchini
- 1968–1969 (Italy) Sergio Realini
- 1969–1970 (Italy) Carlo Facchini
- 1970–1971 (Italy) Carlo Facchini
  (Italy) Luciano Sassi
- 1971–1973 (Italy) Luciano Sassi
- 1973–1974 (Italy) Luciano Sassi
  (Italy) Giovanni Visentin
- 1974–1975 (Italy) Fausto Braga
  (Italy) Mario Trezzi
- 1975–1979 (Italy) Mario Trezzi
- 1979–1980 (Italy) Adelio Crespi
- 1981–1983 (Italy) Pietro Maroso
- 1983–1984 (Italy) Pietro Maroso
  (Italy) Romualdo Capocci
- 1984–1986 (Italy) Andrea Valdinoci
- 1986–1987 (Italy) Giovanni Ardemagni
- 1987–1988 (Italy) Mauro Bicicli
- 1989–1990 (Italy) Giorgio Veneri
- 1990–1991 (Italy) Luciano Magistrelli
  (Italy) Mauro Bicicli
- 1991–1992 (Italy) Abramo Rossetti
  (Italy) Giancarlo Danova
- 1992–1993 (Italy) Marco Torresani
- 1993–1995 (Italy) Luigi Vallongo
- 1995–1996 (Italy) Renzo Contratto
  (Italy) Giovanni Sacchi and Mauro Bicicli
- 1996–1997 (Italy) Loris Boni
- 1997–1998 (Italy) Carlo Muraro
- 1998–1999 (Italy) Gian Marco Remondina
- 1999–2000 (Italy) Roberto Bacchin
- 2000–2001 (Italy) Roberto Bacchin
  (Italy) Carlo Muraro
  (Italy) Ernestino Ramella
- 2001–2002 (Italy) Mario Belluzzo
  (Italy) Ernestino Ramella
- 2002–2003 (Italy) Ernestino Ramella
  (Italy) Angelo Gregucci
- 2003–2004 (Italy) Pierluigi Casiraghi
  (Italy) Stefano Di Chiara
- 2004–2005 (Italy) Stefano Di Chiara
  (Italy) Arcangelo Sciannimanico
  (Italy) Giancarlo Oddi
- 2005–2006 (Italy) Vincenzo Maiuri and Gianpaolo Spagnulo
  (Italy) Gianpaolo Spagnulo
  (Italy) Luciano Miani
  (Italy) Gianpaolo Spagnulo, and (Italy) Nicolas Gennarielli
- 2006–2007 (Italy) Gianfranco Motta
- 2007–2008 (Italy) Claudio Gabetta
  (Italy) Egidio Notaristefano
- 2008–2009 (Italy) Attilio Lombardo
- 2009–2010 (Italy) Giuseppe Scienza
- 2011–2013 (Italy) Massimo Rovellini
- 2013–2014 (Italy) Massimo Rovellini
  (Italy) Alessandro Cerri
- 2014–incumbent (Italy) Stefano Di Gioia

== Honours ==
Serie C2

- Winners (2): 1982–83 (group B), 2006–07 (group A)

Campionato Nazionale Dilettanti

- Winners: 1992–93 (group A)

Serie D

- Winners: 1999–2000 (group B)

Prima Categoria

- Winners: 2011–12 (group N)

Promozione

- Winners: 2012–13 (group A)

Prima Categoria:

- Runners-up (2): 1919–20 (group C), 1920–21 (group D)

Prima Divisione:

- Runners-up (2): 1922–23 (group B), 1927–28 (group B)

Serie B

- Runners-up (3): 1946–47 (group A), 1950–51, 1952–53

Serie D:

- Runners-up (2): 1976–77 (group B), 1977–78 (group B)

Campionato Nazionale Dilettanti:

- Runners-up: 1997–98 (group B)

Eccellenza:

- Runners-up: 2013–14 (group A)
