= Contrade of Legnano =

Historical subdivisions of Legnano, Italy

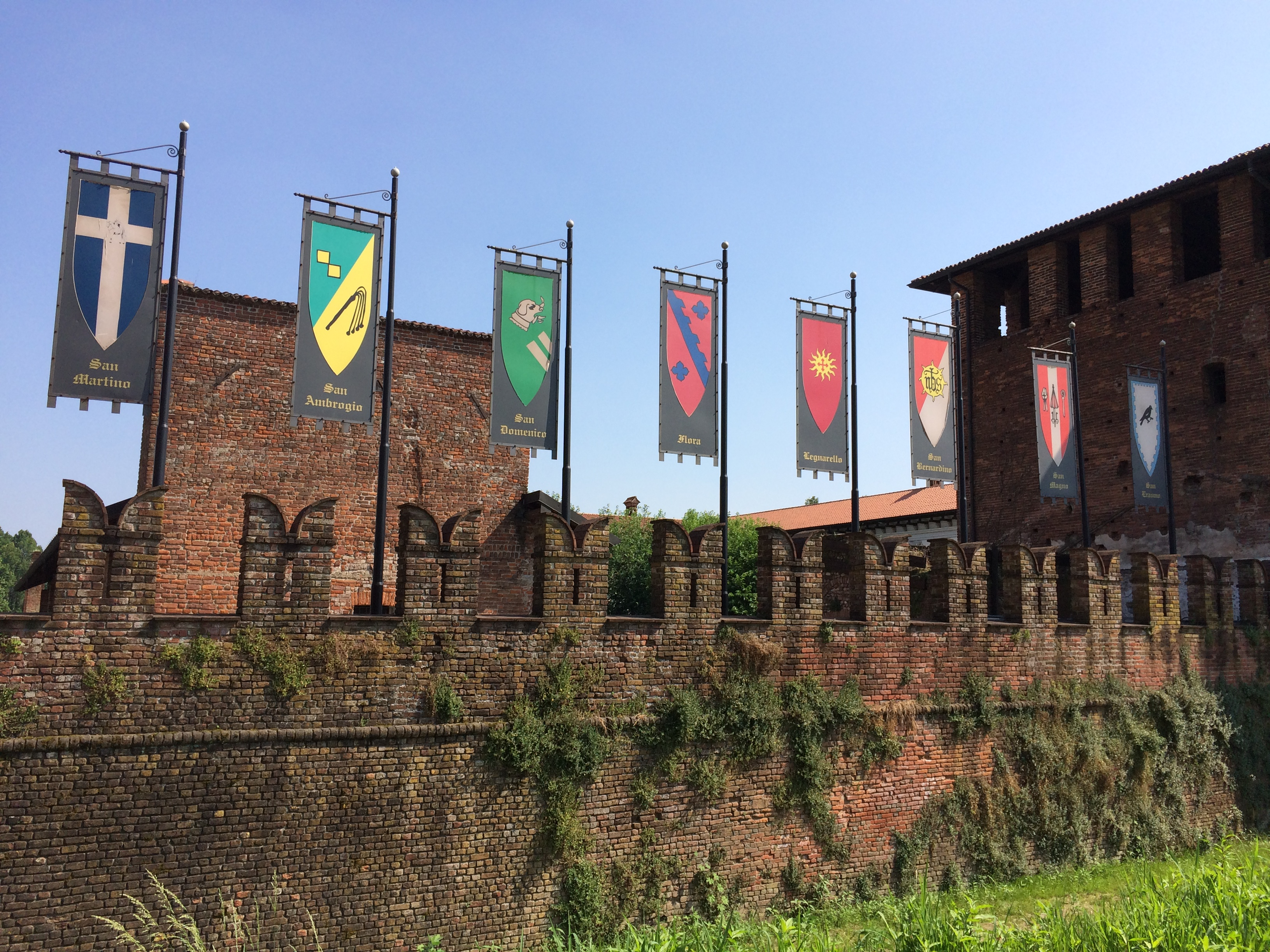
A glimpse of Visconteo Castle of Legnano, with the banners of the eight contrade

The contrade of Legnano are the eight historical subdivisions into which the city of Legnano, in Lombardy, in Italy, is divided. They participate annually in the Palio di Legnano.

== Generality ==
=== The active contrade ===
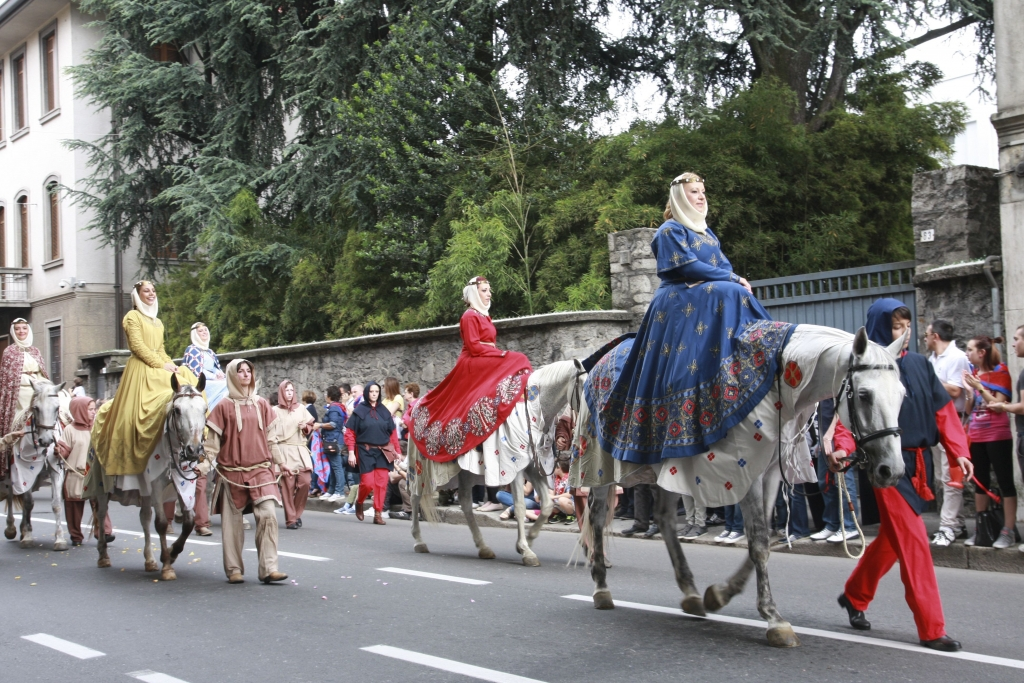
A moment of the historic parade of Palio di Legnano 2015

The eight contrade of Legnano, whose mottos were introduced in 1955, are:

- Contrada La Flora: "let seed be virtue, victory be flower"
- Contrada Legnarello: "alone in the Sun";
- Contrada San Bernardino: "the bridge links virtue to glory";
- Contrada San Domenico: "in the green hope";
- Contrada San Magno: "not always winners, but always first";
- Contrada San Martino: "to the end";
- Contrada Sant'Ambrogio: "they hate me, as long as they fear me";
- Contrada Sant'Erasmo: "love and splendor in battle on the hill thanks to the crow".

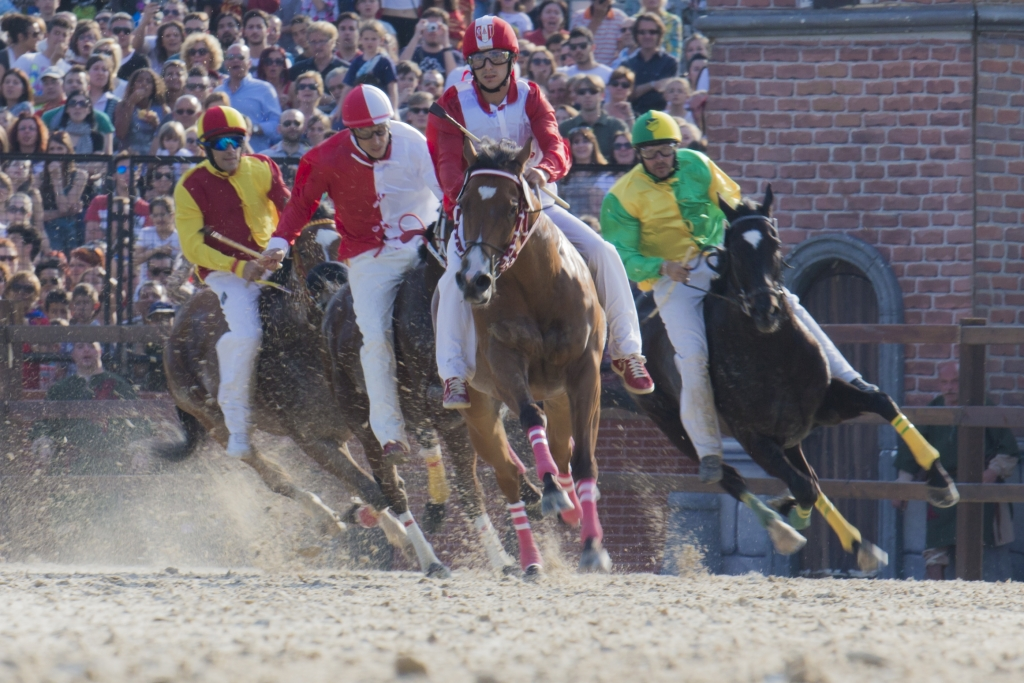
A moment of the horse race of the Palio di Legnano 2014

The antagonism and the competition between the contrade are very much felt, with a strong collegiate component and particularly in the period of the year in which the Palio is organized, without prejudice to the mutual respect that leads to mutual aid in the organization of the event as in the case, for example, of the frequent exchanges of the material used in the parade. To avoid the pranks, which are frequent near the date of the Palio, the horses participating in the horse race, the night before the latter, are hidden in a secret place and cared for by the Contrada members.

There are two contrade in Milan that have an additional title in the name; San Magno also has the term "noble" in its name, which derives from the territory of the contrada, which includes the historic center of Legnano, and from the fact that since ancient times, within the confines of the contrada, there are several families of noble lineage, while La Flora has as title "sovereign", attribution that was officially granted by the House of Savoy, ruling dynasty in Italy from 1861 to 1946.

=== The contrade suppressed ===
- Contrada Olmina
- Contrada Ponzella

In the first years in which the Palio of Legnano was disputed there were also the Contrada Ponzella and the Contrada Olmina, which were incorporated, respectively, by San Bernardino and La Flora (in 1936), and by Legnarello (in 1937); they were merged in the 1930s because at the time the neighborhoods to which they referred were not very inhabited, and therefore had difficulty in financially supporting the participation in the Palio.

The banners of the two suppressed contrade still participate in the historical parade of the Palio of Legnano; in particular, they follow the banner of the contrade to which they have been annexed, supplies of their armed escort. The two suppressed contrade had no motto: the latter were in fact introduced in 1955, three years after the suppression of these contrade.

== The manors ==
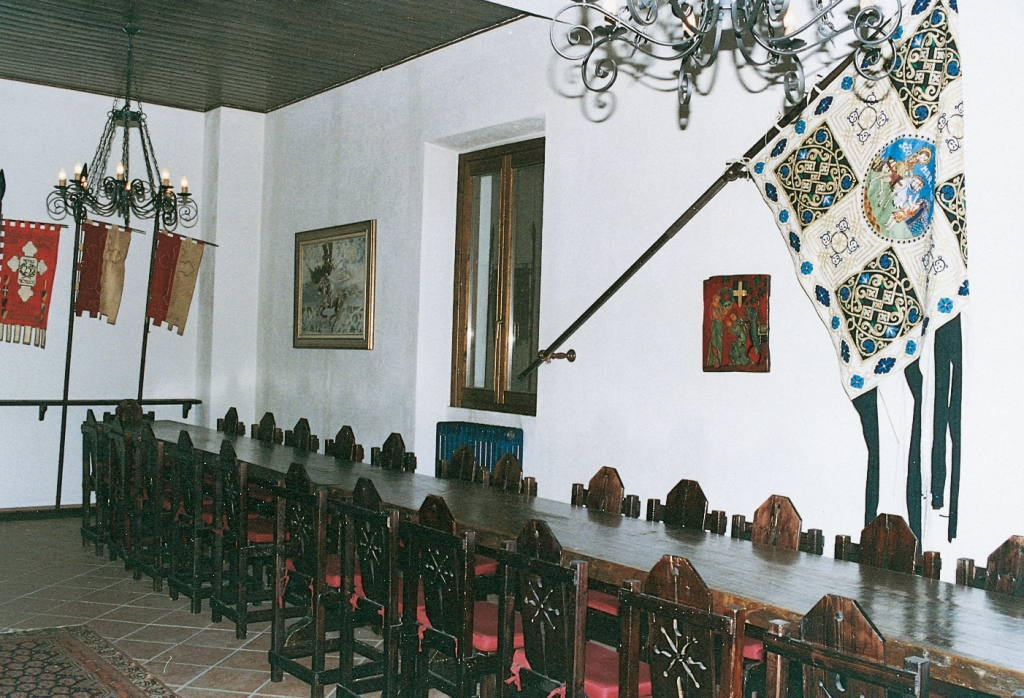
The hall of honor of the Contrada San Martino, located in the manor of the historic Legnano contrada

The contrade are located in the so-called "manors"; sometimes the manors, which are the property of the contrade, are housed in ancient Lombard courts, that is to say in buildings particularly linked to the territory, especially to that of the historical contrada of which they are the seat. At the center of the contrada there is the hall of honor, which is furnished in medieval style.

The manors are places open to all that host the meetings and activities of the contrada. The various rooms preserve the costumes of the past and present, while weapons and flags are placed in the racks installed on the walls; the display cases instead house the jewels and ornaments during the parade, as well as the gifts received by the contrade over time. Inside the contrada there is also the documentary archive of the contrada. The contrade are often the destination for school trips, during which students can immerse themselves in the medieval atmosphere.

== The organization and the regency ==
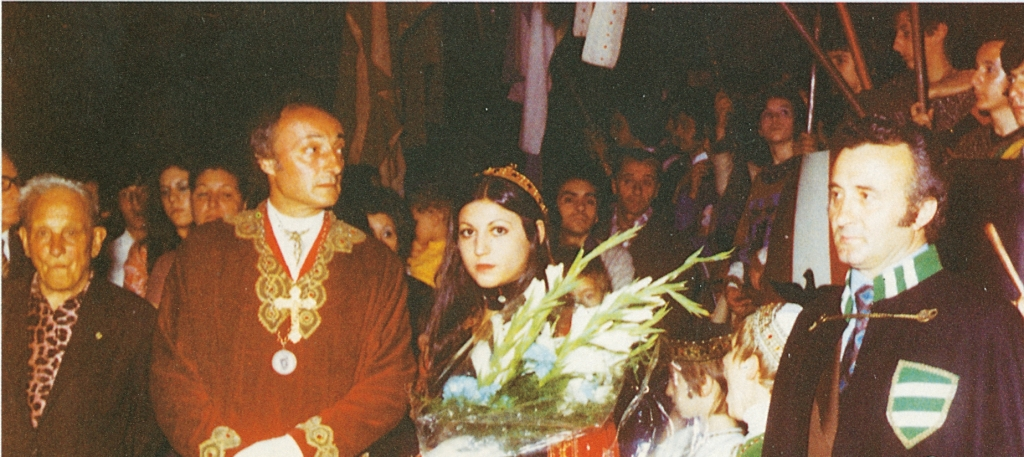
The regency of the Contrada San Domenico in 1973. The first on the left is Vittorio Ciapparelli, first winner of the Palio of Legnano (1935). You can see the pectoral cross worn by the captain around his neck, symbol of victory in the previous palio.

Each of the eight contrade of Legnano has a regency formed by a "captain", a "great prior" and a "chatelaine". The captain of the contrada is the one who represents the contrada on all official occasions and has the task of choosing the jockey and the horse participating in the horse race. In all official ceremonies he wears a white cloak and as a distinctive sign he has a patent parchment. The captain, depending on the contrada, can be elected by the general assembly or by its members.

The function of grand prior, which was established in 1971, has the function of assisting the captain in his duties. He is also the legal representative of the contrada and checks that the status of the contrada is applied. The grand prior, in all official ceremonies, wears a black cloak, while as a distinctive sign he has a shield with cross-shaped features and a parchment. Next to the great prior is his deputy, who takes his place in his absence.

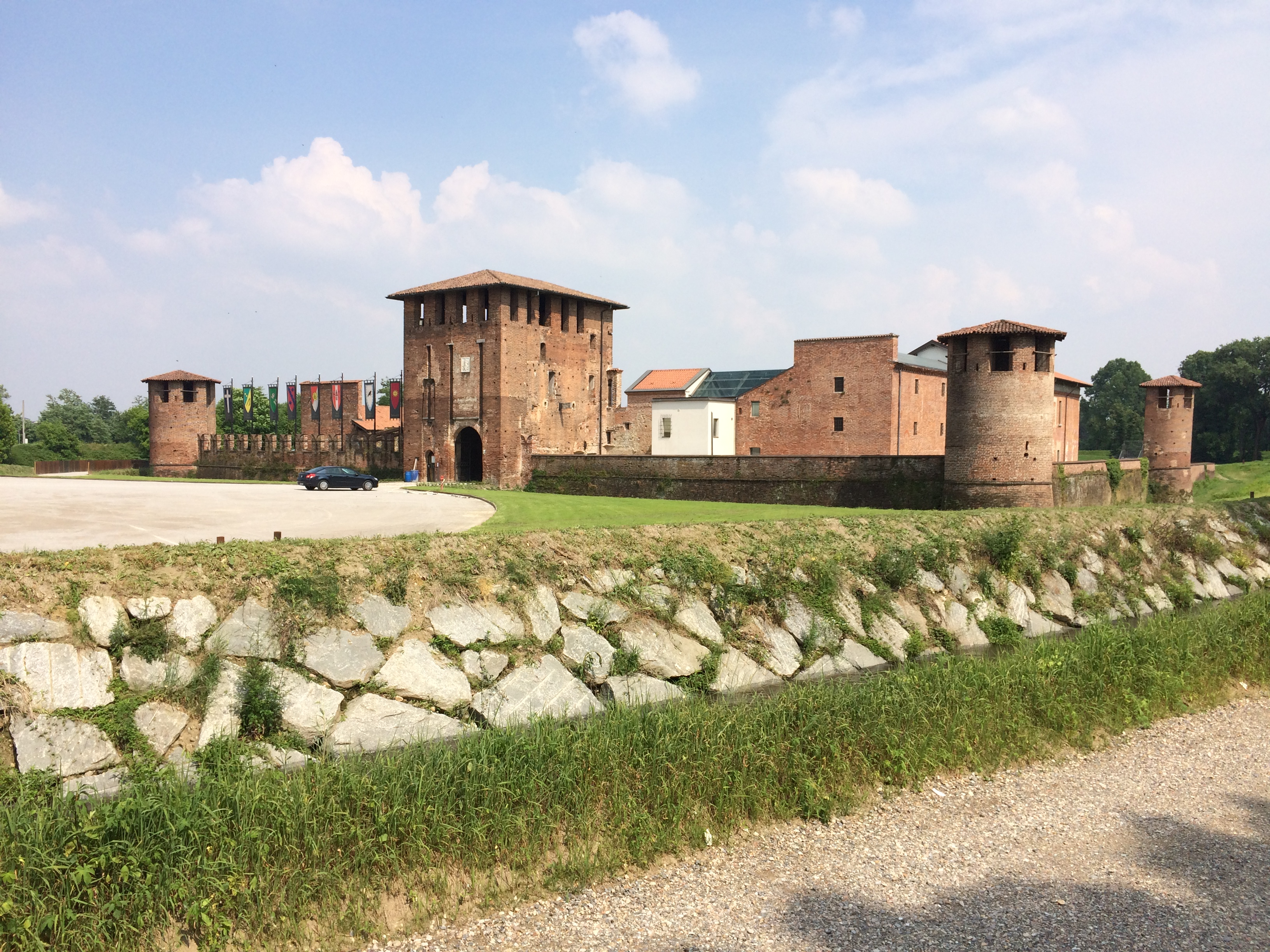
The Visconteo castle of Legnano, site of the "College of captains and contrade"

The chatelaine, like the captain and the great prior, has a representative role in official ceremonies and has the task of participating in the organization of the contests in the contrada. The chatelaine, who are helped in their job by the great ladies, are united in the association "Oratorio delle castellane", which also unites the most non-regent chatelaine. The chatelaine, in all official ceremonies, wears a red cloak, while as a distinctive sign she has a medal and a parchment.

Another important office of the contrada is the squire, who helps the captain in the performance of his duties. The squire can also supply the captain in the events organized by the contrada and as a distinctive sign he has a shield with cross-shaped features.

All the official ceremonies of the Palio are organized and cared for by the masters of ceremonies of the College of captains and contrade.

The captains are gathered in the College of captains and contrade, whose function is to coordinate the activities, actions and intentions of the same. This College was born in 1955, is located inside the Visconteo Castle of Legnano and is presided over by the grand master of the captains' college, who is elected every two years. On the occasion of the elections, which take place in a social assembly called "session", his deputy, the directors of the executive, the auditors and the arbitrators are also voted. Other functions of the college of captains are the preservation of the traditions of Legnano and its contrade. The college has as its official banner a white-red banner (colors of the municipal coat of arms of Legnano) bearing the cross of Aribert and the coats of arms of the contrade.

== The activities ==
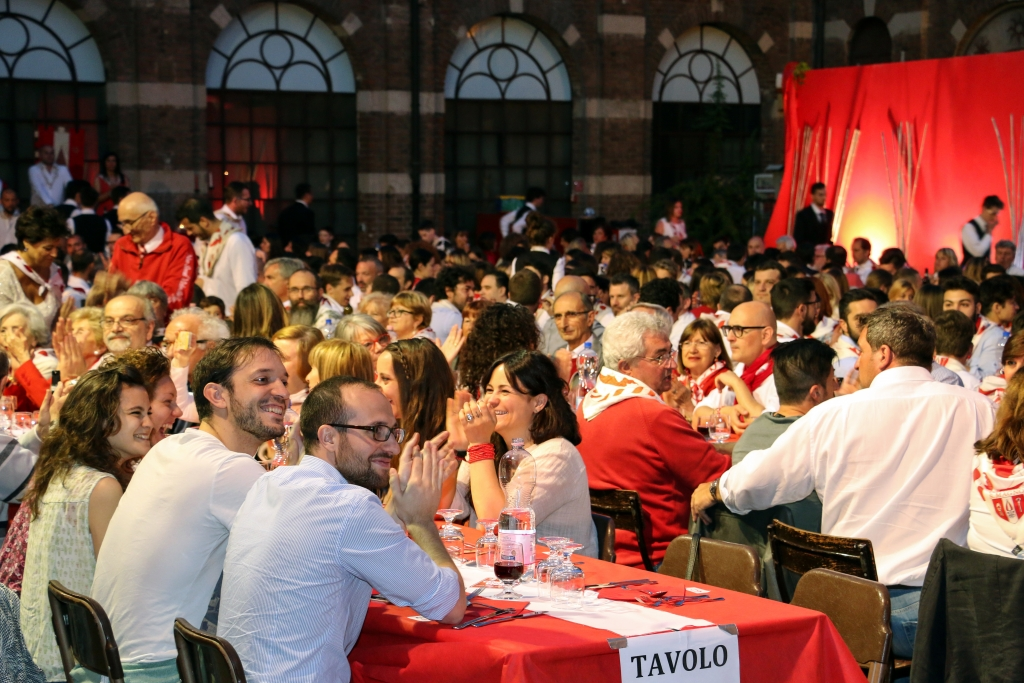
Propitiatory dinner in the Contrada San Magno for the Palio di Legnano 2015

During the year the contrade organize parties, cultural and historical events, as well as folklore and charity events. In the first decades of existence of the event, the manors were frequented only during the month preceding the Palio, but with the passing of the years the activities of the contrade experienced a constant phase of growth that led the historical contrade to diversify the initiatives, with the organization of the latter taking place throughout the year. The contrade have often been protagonists, even financially, in the restoration of historic buildings in the contrada, such as the churches to which the contrade refer.

The activities of the contrade are manifold. They range from periodicals to publications, to the preparation of popular festivals such as the grape festival, horse, bread, etc., as well as the organization of antique markets, dance classes, embroidery, ceramics, painting and preparation of ski competitions, soccer and table football tournaments.

Conferences and evenings are then organized focusing on history, poetry, dance and music, as well as concerts and charity events. The contrade of Legnano also operate in the social context, helping the disabled, families in difficulty and the elderly hospitalized in the centers of the area, to which they also provide moral support by making periodic visits.

Of great attraction is the propitiatory dinner on the eve, which is organized the evening before the Palio and which is greeted by the contrada decked out for a party, attended by hundreds of Contrada members and the jockey who will race the horse race. In the first editions of the event the dinner on the eve was the prerogative of the jockey and the elders of the contrada: only later was it decided to open the participation to all the volunteers that revolve around the contrada; the latter, on the eve of dinner, wear scarves from their own contrada. Sometimes at the dinner on the eve there is also, in an enclosure, also the horse that will race the next horse race.

== The eight contrade ==
=== La Flora ===
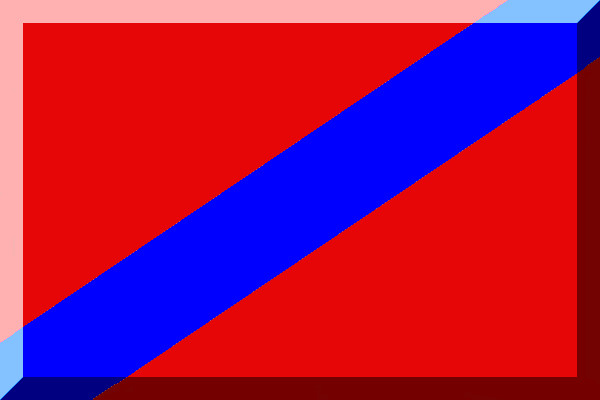

It has a total of 9 victories in the Palio di Legnano. It is located in the "Oltre Stazione" area (i.e. west of the Domodossola–Milan railway), to the north-west of the city. Legend has it that the contrada owes its name to the joyful exultation of the women of the neighborhood after the battle of Legnano. After the victory, with the passage of the Lombard League, the contradaiole of La Flora would have thrown flowers at the feet of the soldiers, hence the name of the contrada.

According to this tradition, the red color symbolizes the blood of Lombard soldiers while the blue one symbolizes military glory. The meaning that today is associated with the colors of the contrada is instead the following: red indicates courage, ardor, strength and tenacity, while blue chivalrous loyalty.

Another popular legend tells that Frederick Barbarossa was defeated in the battle of Legnano due to a glittering cross shown by the goddess Flora, who frightened the emperor and forced him to flee. The goddess Flora is very present in the popular beliefs of the place: according to tradition this mythological figure appeared every year in early spring to scatter flowers on the fields of the contrada. On one occasion it appeared late and spread, on the lawns of the contrada, blue cornflowers and red poppies, whose flowers bloom in summer. These colors then became representative of the contrada.

=== Legnarello ===
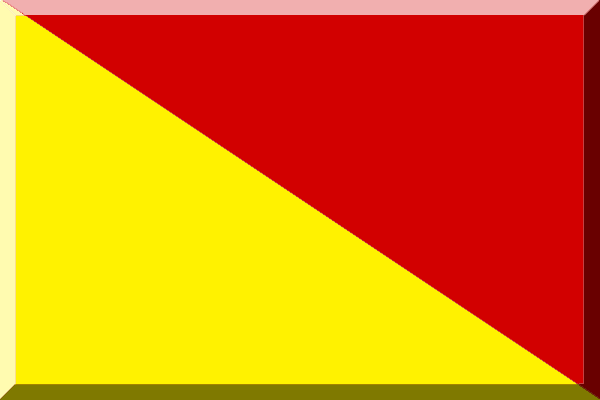

It has a total of 11 victories in the Palio di Legnano. It is located in the area beyond the strada statale del Sempione, to the north-east of the city. Legnarello's colors and banner are linked to a legend and a historical fact. Both explanations can be traced back to the Spanish rule over the Duchy of Milan, during which Legnanello became a noble quarter inhabited by Spanish nobles. Red and yellow, in addition to the colors of Legnarello, are also the Spanish national colors.

The legend tells that the hidalgo don Pedro de Torquemada, living in Legnarello, used to wear half-red and half-yellow clothes in combat. Despite the high visibility of the garments, his enemies never managed to hit him and so the Spanish nobleman decided to hoist a red flag with a yellow sun on his house, symbols that were then taken over by the Legnarello contrada.

The historical fact is instead connected to Donna Consuelo of the Melzi D'Eril; the Spanish noblewoman died of plague in 1621, and as a legacy she established that in her home in Legnanello the yellow-red banners of the governor of Córdoba, Spain, should have been kept. These signs then became the symbol of the Contrada Legnarello.

=== San Bernardino ===
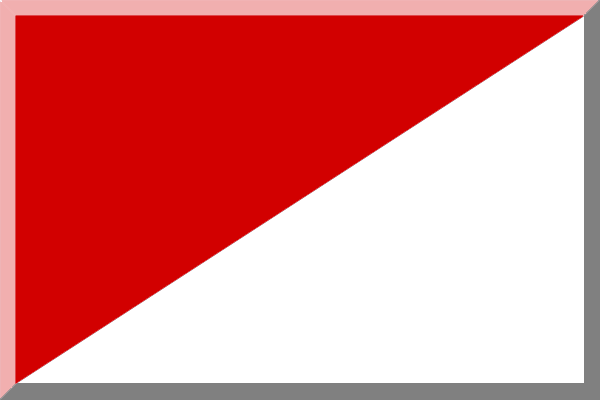

It has a total of 9 victories in the Palio di Legnano. It is located in the area "Oltre Stazione" (that is to the west of the Domodossola-Milan railway), to the south-west of the city, it is one of the largest contrade. There are two legends that explain the colors of the contrada. The first tells of a master-at-arms who wanted to sentence a girl to death for rejecting his love. This master-at-arms would have pardoned the young woman only if the bells of the little church of San Bernardino had resonated without human intervention. Immediately after the first swing shaken by the aggressor, the bells began to ring by themselves and this attracted the attention of some passing knights, who intervened by rescuing the girl.

The second legend tells instead of an aggression suffered by a girl in the countryside of the contrada by a bear. At his request for help, the inhabitants made the bells of the church of San Bernardino ring. Their sound was heard by some passing knights, who saved the young woman.

In both legends the tunics of the girls soiled by blood became the flag of the contrada, where the white of the dress indicates the purity of the girl, while the red of the blood her regality of mind. The contrada proposes in its banner, in addition to the white and red colors, the reference to a radiant eight-pointed sun and a trigram with Gothic characters bearing the writing Nbs (Latin abbreviation corresponding to "Noster Bernardinus Sanctus"; in English it is translated as "our saint Bernardino"). This coat of arms is connected to the tablet that St. Bernardino presented to believers after his homilies.

=== San Domenico ===
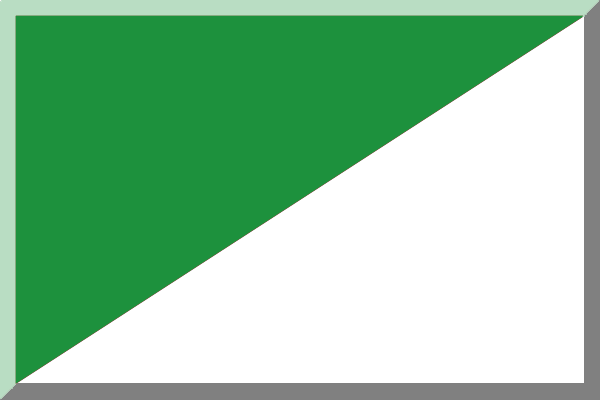

It has a total of 7 victories in the Palio di Legnano. It is the only contrada that does not border on any other municipality, and it is the historical contrada that won the first edition of the Palio (1935). There are two legends that explain the colors of the contrada. The first tells of a dog that found two tibiae in the fields of the contrada that belonged to warriors who had died in the battle of Legnano. The dog, after giving the bones to the inhabitants of the contrada, went with them, with a torch lit in the mouth, to a place where they could be buried honorably. Wanting to tie the colors of the contrada to this legend, the green symbolizes the shade of the fields, while the white the bones of the soldiers perished in the battle.

Another legend tells that once, in Legnano, there were two convents. These monasteries, at a certain point, merged into a single religious institute. The two convents were connected by a secret tunnel that was haunted by a ghost. This ghost, during the night, scares the inhabitants of the neighborhood with infernal noises caused by the creeping of its chains. The guardian father of the monastery, Fra' Bonino, decided to remedy the problem by awaiting the ghost at one of the two entrances to the tunnel. At a certain point, during the night, the ghost appeared, which explained to the friar that he was the Germanic soldier Rudolf Himmer, who was left buried by the battle of Legnano. The ghost told the friar that he would no longer disturb the sleep of the inhabitants of the neighborhood if the friar had given a proper burial to his bones, which were scattered in the tunnel. The friar granted the wish of the ghost but, not remembering the soldier's name, he placed on his grave a green flag and two white bones. This composition then became the emblem of the Contrada San Domenico.

The symbol of the contrada, that is a dog with a torch in its mouth, as well as being connected to the first narrated legend, also has a religious explanation: it derives from the order of the Dominicans, who were called the "greyhounds of the Lord", that is to say the bearers of the light of faith.

=== San Magno ===

It has a total of 11 victories in the Palio di Legnano. It is located in the central-southern area of the city. The most famous and well-known legend, among those that narrate the origin of the colors of the contrada, tells that an Austrian oak was erected long ago in today's Piazza San Magno. On the day of the patron saint, on November 5, a farmer began to contemplate the tree admiring its ability to withstand frost and snow. Thus the peasant expressed the desire to be able to resist life's difficulties in the same way. At that moment Saint Magnus appeared, who offered to satisfy man's desire by giving him the strength, the recklessness and the power of a lion. The Saint ordered the farmer to kill a rabbit and advance on the ground, covered in snow, where the animal's blood had been spilled. The farmer carried out the orders and then Saint Magnus granted his dream turning it into a lion. Once the prodigy was completed, the Saint suddenly disappeared without satisfying the farmer who asked him to return as a man, thus punishing his pride.

The white of the snow and the red of the blood of the rabbit became the symbol of the contrada. These colors, the tree and the lion were also included in the coat of arms and gonfalon of the city of Legnano.

According to another legend, white and red are associated with the blood left on the snow by saints Sebastian and Roch, who had gone to Legnano to contemplate the frescoes in the basilica of San Magno.

In the emblem of the contrada there is, above the red field on the left, the miter of Saint Magnus. In the center, above the white color, are depicted his episcopal umbrella and his provostural keys, while his crosier is represented above the red field on the right.

=== San Martino ===

It has a total of 5 victories in the Palio di Legnano . It is located in the north-central area of the city, towards the border with the municipalities of Castellanza and Busto Arsizio. There are two legends that explain the colors of the contrada. The first tells of a noble vassal of Charlemagne who was lost in the fields of San Martino while he was training with horses. The vassal, at a certain point, met a woodsman, to whom he asked the way to follow to find his way home; the woodcutter, after having indicated a cross-shaped cloud formation, told him that if he followed it he would find the right direction. The nobleman, to thank him, allowed the woodcutter to use the white cross in a blue field as a symbol of his family: subsequently the vassal had the emperor's ratification ratified. The white cross on a blue field then became the symbol of the contrada.

A second legend tells of a young shepherd who lost himself in the countryside around the ancient church of San Martino, later replaced by the homonymous religious building. The little shepherd, not finding his way home, at one point began to cry and pleaded with God asking him for help. Suddenly a luminous cross appeared in the sky that showed him the way back home.

According to these legends the blue of the emblem of the contrada is associated with the sky, while white is the divine color. The banner instead recalls the religious iconography of Saint Martin, who shows the saint in the act of cutting his cloak to give it to a poor man.

=== Sant'Ambrogio ===

It has a total of 6 victories in the Palio di Legnano. It is located in the central-southern area of the city. The colors of the contrada are explained by a legend and by a historical fact that actually happened. Legend has it that once a year, in a February night, a yellow-skinned demon used to wander the streets of the neighborhood dressed in an old greenish tunic, with the intention of going to the church of Sant'Ambrogio to carry out thefts. The raids lasted until the pastor, tired of these disappearances, put a rosary crown in the lock of the entrance door: in this way the demon found his keys blocked and put his fingers to free the hole, but touching the sacred object deflated and died, leaving its yellowish skin and its green cloak on the churchyard. The following morning the faithful, going to church, found these remains and adopted these colors as symbols of the contrada.

Another explanation, this time of an historical nature, comes from the discovery of the body of the Archbishop of Milan Leone da Perego, who died in Legnano in 1257 in the homonymous palace, under the portico of the church of Sant'Ambrogio; this finding occurred in 1650 during the enlargement of the religious building.

According to two mediaeval chroniclers, the body of Leone da Perego was buried in the church of San Salvatore in Legnano. Still according to the accounts of Agostino Pozzo, to find his treasure, which was believed buried in the church of Sant'Ambrogio and which was said to be composed of gold and bronze objects, he continued to dig, but in vain. After his discovery, the body of Leone da Perego disappeared without leaving a trace.

Considering the historical event linked to the discovery of the archbishop's body, the meaning of yellow and green is connected, respectively, to the gold and bronze of the treasure of Leone da Perego. On the banner of the contrada is instead depicted the staff of St. Ambrose.

=== Sant'Erasmo ===

It has a total of 13 victories in the Palio di Legnano. It is situated to the south-east and borders with the municipalities of San Vittore Olona and Cerro Maggiore. The crow, symbol of the contrada, originates from a legend linked to the Legnanese ancient convent of Santa Caterina and located chronologically just before the battle of Legnano, around the year 1000.

It is said that from this monastery, at some point, food began to disappear, and therefore the abbot, Bernardo Paletta, decided to establish a guard service to control the pantry. The following morning the friar on guard, Fra' Camillo, saw a crow in the window come in such a black and shiny plumage that it looked bluish. The animal, at one point, stole bread and cheese from the pantry, and flew out the window. The friars followed the crow and saw the animal heading towards a group of three elders who were grouped around a white tablecloth. At this point the animal came down from the three and gave them food. To thank God for the miracle, the friars decided to build a shelter, the aforementioned St. Erasmus hospice. This shelter building was later dedicated to Saint Erasmus because near the place where the elders consumed the meal there was a small chapel dedicated to this saint.

For this reason the blue of the emblem of the contrada symbolizes heaven and charity, while white love and wisdom. The banner instead recalls the crow, its bluish plumage and the white tablecloth of the three elders.

== Bibliography ==
- (in Italian) Autori vari, Il Palio di Legnano : Sagra del Carroccio e Palio delle Contrade nella storia e nella vita della città, Banca di Legnano, 2015.
- (in Italian) Giorgio D'Ilario, Egidio Gianazza, Augusto Marinoni, Marco Turri, Profilo storico della città di Legnano, Edizioni Landoni, 1984
- (in Italian) Giorgio D'Ilario, Sagra del Carroccio - Palio delle Contrade, Tipotecnica, 2000.
- (in Italian) Gabriella Ferrarini, Marco Stadiotti, Legnano una città, la sua storia, la sua anima, Telesio editore, 2001.

== See also ==
- Battle of Legnano
- Contrade of Siena
- Legnano
- Palio di Legnano
