= Angelo Cameroni =

Italian footballer (1891-1961)

Personal information
- Full name: Angelo Arturo Cameroni
- Date of birth: 1 April 1891
- Place of birth: Legnano, Kingdom of Italy
- Date of death: 22 September 1961 (aged 70)
- Position: Goalkeeper

Senior career*
Years	Team	Apps	(Gls)
1913–1915	Como	17	(0)
1915–1916	Internazionale	4	(0)
1916–1920	Legnano		
1920–1921	Milanese		
1921–1925	Legnano	80	(0)
1925–1927	Milanese		
1927–1928	Cremonese	0	(0)

International career
1920	Italy	1	(0)
- * Club domestic league appearances and goals

Angelo Arturo Cameroni (Italian pronunciation: [ˈandʒelo arˈtuːro kameˈroːni]; 1 April 1891 – 22 September 1961) was an Italian professional footballer who played as a goalkeeper.

He made his only appearance for the Italy national football team on 18 January 1920 in a game against France.
