= Otto Krappan =

German football manager (1886–1942)

Personal information
- Full name: Otto Krappan
- Date of birth: 11 October 1886
- Place of birth: Nagyszeben, Austria-Hungary
- Date of death: 2 February 1942 (aged 55)
- Place of death: Palermo, Italy

Managerial career
- Years: Team
- 1923–1926: Udinese
- 1927–1932: Monfalcone
- 1932–1933: Legnano
- 1933–1934: Vicenza
- 1934–1935: Alessandria
- 1935–1936: Lecco
- 1936–1937: Pro Gorizia
- 1937–1939: Cosenza
- 1939–1940: Cremonese
- 1940–1941: Alessandria
- 1941–1942: Palermo-Juve

Otto Krappan (11 October 1886 – 2 February 1942) was a German professional football manager.

== Career ==
Born in Nagyszeben, Austria-Hungary, in a family of Transylvanian Saxons, (today Sibiu, Romania). Krappan managed several clubs in Italy between 1923 and 1942, year in which he suddenly died while training Palermo-Juve in Serie C.

He managed Udinese in Prima Divisione and Alessandria in 1934–35 Serie A.
