= UC Sampdoria =

Italian football club

Sampdoria
- Full name: Unione Calcio Sampdoria S.p.A.
- Nicknames: I Blucerchiati (The Blue-Circled); La Samp; Il Doria
- Founded: 12 August 1946; 80 years ago, as Unione Calcio Sampdoria
- Stadium: Stadio Comunale Luigi Ferraris
- Capacity: 33,205
- Owner: Blucerchiati S.p.A.
- President: Francesco De Gennaro
- Head coach: Luca D'Angelo
- League: Serie B
- 2025–26: Serie B, 13th of 20
- Website: sampdoria.it
Home colours	Away colours

Unione Calcio Sampdoria, commonly referred to as Sampdoria (Italian pronunciation: [sampˈdɔːrja, sanˈdɔːrja]), is an Italian professional football club based in Genoa, Liguria.

Sampdoria was formed in 1946 from the merger of two existing sports clubs whose roots can be traced back to the 1890s, Sampierdarenese and Andrea Doria. Both the team name and colours reflect this union, the first being a combination of the names, the second taking the form of a unique kit design, predominantly blue (for Andrea Doria) with white, red and black bands (for Sampierdarenese) across the centre of the shirt, hence the nickname blucerchiati ("blue-circled").

Sampdoria play at Stadio Luigi Ferraris, capacity 33,205, which they share with Genoa's older club, Genoa CFC. The fierce rivalry between the two teams is commonly known as the Derby della Lanterna, and has been contested in Serie A for most of its history.

Sampdoria have won the Scudetto once in their history, in 1991. The club has also won the Coppa Italia four times, in 1985, 1988, 1989 and 1994, and the Supercoppa Italiana once, in 1991. Their biggest European success came when they won the Cup Winners' Cup in 1990. They also reached the European Cup final in 1992, losing the final 1–0 to Barcelona after extra-time.

== History ==
=== Sampierdarenese and Andrea Doria (1891–1927) ===
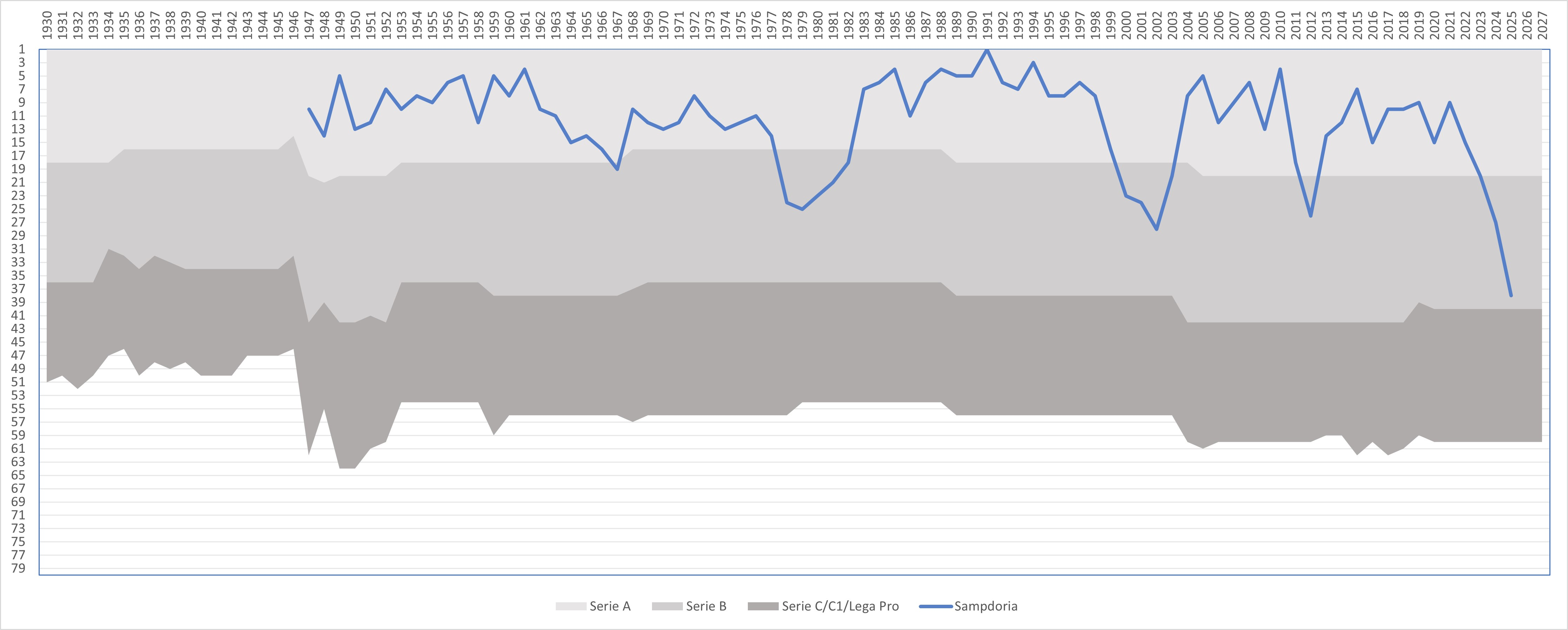
The performance of Sampdoria in the Italian football league structure since the club's foundation in 1946.

The roots of Sampdoria are to be found in two teams born in the late 1890s: Società Ginnastica Sampierdarenese and Società Andrea Doria. The former was founded in 1891 and opened its football section in 1899. The latter, named after Genoese admiral Andrea Doria, was founded in 1895.

Andrea Doria did not join the first Italian Football Championship organised by the Italian Federation of Football (FIF) and played on 8 May 1898. Instead, they played in the football tournament organised by the Italian Federation of Ginnastica. The first ancestor of Sampdoria to play in the Italian Football Championship was Sampierdarenese, who joined the third edition in 1900 for their only appearance before World War One.

Andrea Doria eventually joined the competition in 1902, but did not win a game until the 1907 edition, when they beat local rivals Genoa 3–1. It was not until 1910–11 that the club began to show promise, finishing above Juventus, Internazionale and Genoa in the main tournament.

After the war Sampierdarenese finally began to compete in the Italian Championship replacing another club from Bolzaneto, then an independent town in the province of Genoa, called Associazione del Calcio Ligure. Thus, during the 1919-20 edition Sampierdarenese and Andrea Doria met in the championship for the first time. Doria won the first-leg game (4–1 and 1–1) and finished second after Genoa in the Liguria group, qualifying for the National Round.

Andrea Doria ended up first in the Liguria group above local rivals Genoa in the 1920-21 Championship.

For the 1921–22 season the Italian top league was split into two competitions, one run by the Italian Football Federation and a second one organised by the secessionist Italian Football Confederation. Sampierdarenese joined the IFF tournament, while Andrea Doria and Genoa signed up for the one organised by the Confederation. Sampierdarenese won the Liguria section and then went on to the semi-finals, finishing top out of three clubs and thus reaching the final against Novese. Both legs of the final ended in 0–0 draws, thus a repetition match was played in Cremona on 21 May 1922. The match went into extra time with Novese eventually winning the tie (and the Championship) 2–1.

By season 1924–25, Sampdoria's ancestors were competing against each other in the Northern League; Andrea Doria finished one place above their rivals and won one match 2–1, while Sampierdarenese were victorious 2–0 in the other.

=== From La Dominante to Sampdoria (1927–1946) ===
A process of unification of the many professional football teams in Italy was started by the Fascist government. Particularly in 1927, multiple smaller clubs were merged into one all over the country. Among many other similar examples, three of the four major teams based in Rome merged and became AS Roma, and Milan-based clubs US Milanese and Inter Milan merged for a time. Similarly, at the end of the 1926–27 season, Sampierdarenese and Andrea Doria merged for the first time under the name La Dominante.

La Dominante
Home colours

Wearing green and black striped shirts, La Dominante Genova lived a short life, having played just three championships, and was not particularly successful. The team was admitted to the 1927-28 Divisione Nazionale Group B, ending the season in 10th place. The next season was the last year of Divisione Nazionale, and Dominante finished in 10th place. Finally, in 1929 Dominante competed in the first-ever Serie B tournament where they finished third, just missing out on promotion.

Dominante then absorbed the local team Corniglianese and competed in the 1930–31 Serie B under the name of Foot Ball Club Liguria. The team did not do well, finishing in 18th place and suffering relegation to Prima Divisione.

Both Sampierdarenese and Andrea Doria reverted to their previous names in 1931 as separate clubs. In the span of just a few years Sampierdarenese then climbed up from Prima Divisione to Serie B and finally Serie A. Ending up second in the Girone D of the 1931–32 Prima Divisione, they got promoted to Serie B. After the uneventful 1932–33 Serie B season, the team proceeded to win the 1933–34 Serie B championship and were promoted into Serie A for the first time.

On 15 July 1937 Sampierdarenese absorbed Corniglianese and Rivarolese, with the club adopting the name Associazione Calcio Liguria. This saw them reach fifth place in Serie A in 1939. In the early 1940s, the club was relegated but bounced straight back up as Serie B champions in 1941.

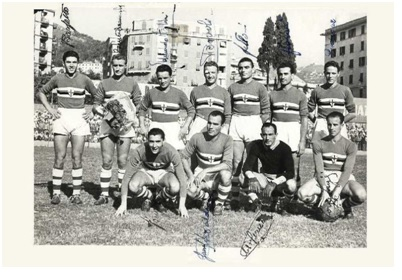
Sampdoria in the late 1940s

After World War II, both Andrea Doria and Sampierdarenese (the name Liguria was abolished in 1945) were competing in Serie A, but in a reverse of pre-war situations, Andrea Doria were now the top club out of the two. However, on 12 August 1946, a merger occurred to create Unione Calcio Sampdoria.

The first chairman of this new club was Piero Sanguineti, but the ambitious entrepreneur Amedeo Rissotto soon replaced him, while the first team coach during this period was a man from Florence named Giuseppe Galluzzi. To illustrate the clubs would be equally represented in the new, merged club, a new kit was designed featuring the blue shirts of Andrea Doria and the white, red and black midsection of Sampierdarenese. In the same month of the merger, the new club demanded they should share the Stadio Luigi Ferraris ground with Genoa. An agreement was reached, and the stadium began hosting Genoa's and Sampdoria's home matches.

=== Early years and the achievements in the Mantovani era (1946–1993) ===
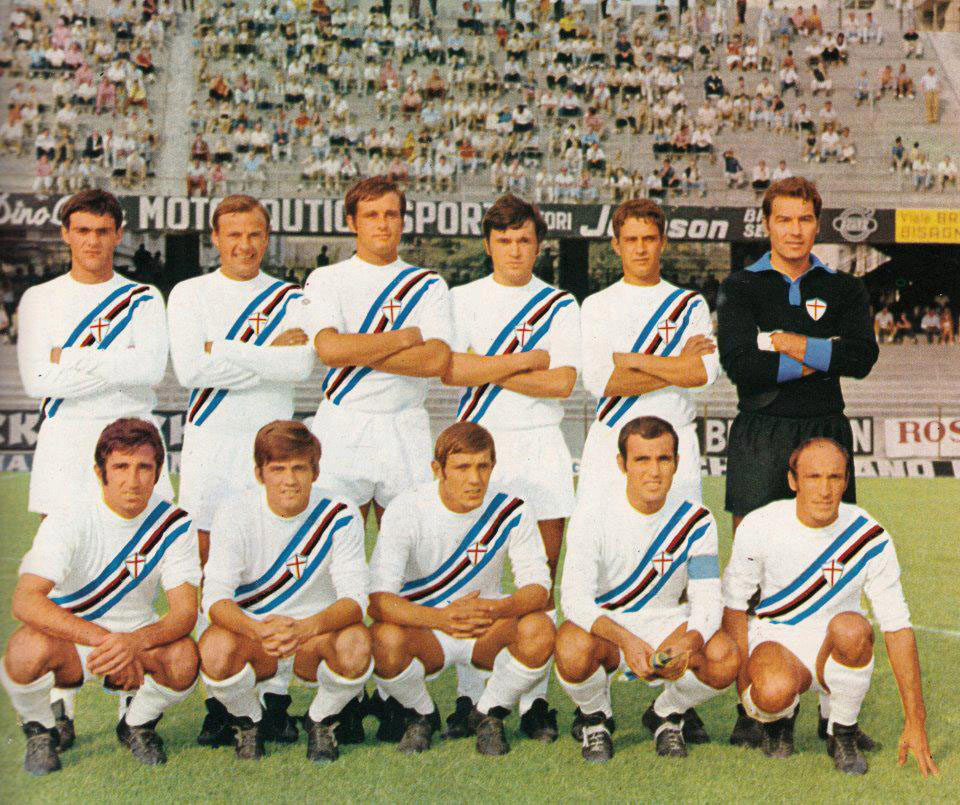
Sampdoria in the 1969–70 season

For about thirty years the Genoese played constantly in Serie A, with mixed results, the best of which was in the 1960–1961 season, in which they obtained fourth place in the championship. In the 1965–1966 season Sampdoria finished sixteenth, relegating to Serie B for the first time in its history; however, the following year they won the second-tier championship and immediately returned to Serie A.

In 1979, the club, then playing Serie B, was acquired by oil businessman Paolo Mantovani (1930–1993), who invested in the team to bring Sampdoria to the top flight. In 1982, Sampdoria made their Serie A return and won their first Coppa Italia in 1985. In 1986, Yugoslav Vujadin Boškov was appointed as the new head coach. The club won their second Coppa Italia in 1988, being admitted to the 1988–89 UEFA Cup Winners' Cup, where they reached the final, losing 2–0 to Barcelona. A second consecutive triumph in the Coppa Italia gave Sampdoria a spot in the 1989–90 Cup Winners' Cup, which they won after defeating Anderlecht after extra time in the final.

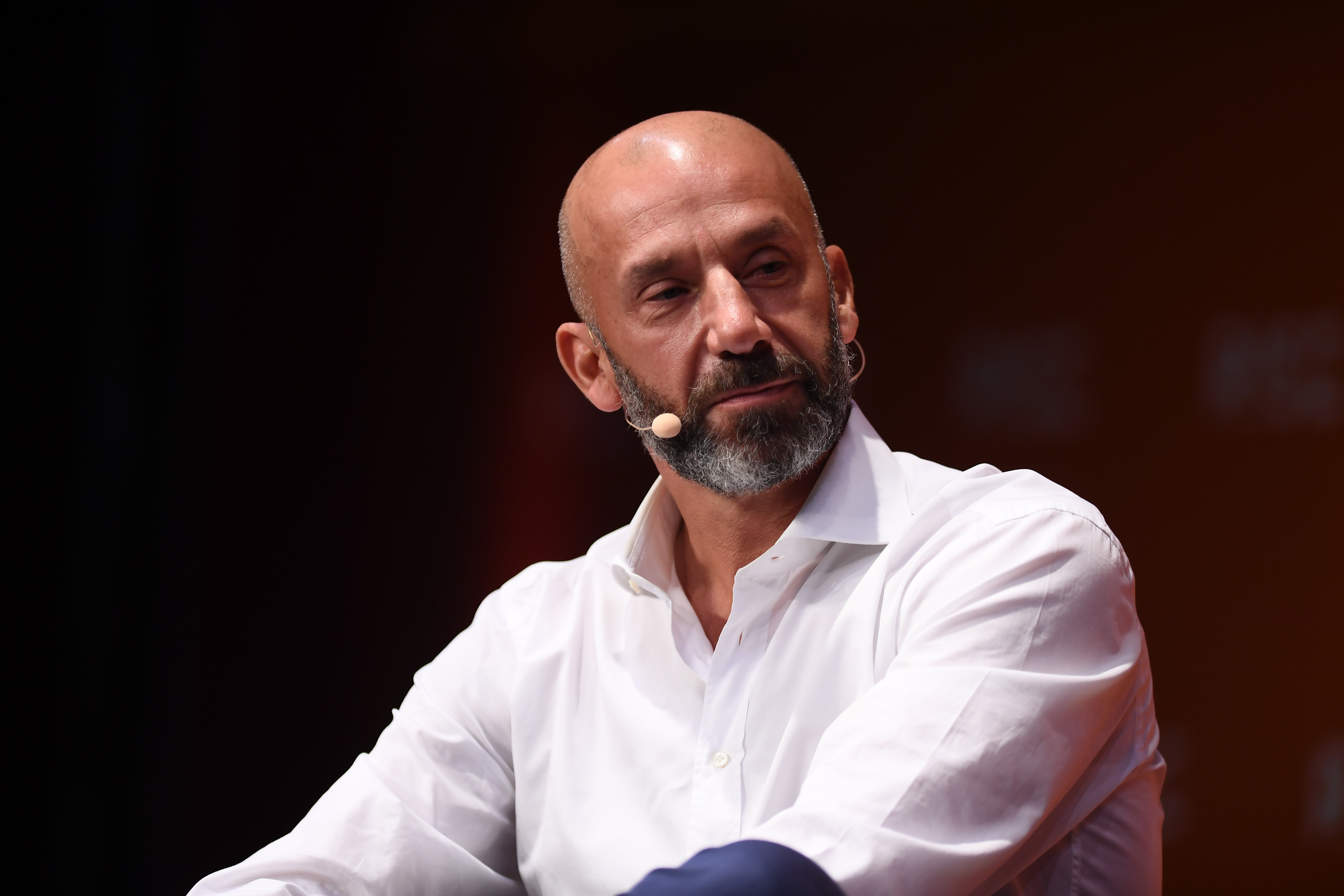
Gianluca Vialli, Sampdoria's number 9 in the golden years between late 1980s and early 1990s.

This was followed only one year later by their first and only Scudetto, being crowned as Serie A champions with a five-point advantage over second-placed Internazionale. The winning team featured several notable players, such as Gianluca Pagliuca, Gianluca Vialli, Roberto Mancini, Toninho Cerezo, Pietro Vierchowod and Attilio Lombardo, with Boškov as head coach. In the following season, Sampdoria reached the European Cup final and were defeated once again by Barcelona, at Wembley Stadium. Vujadin Boškov is recognised as one of Sampdoria's most successful managers winning a record amount of trophies and thus further establishing the club's reputation in Europe.

=== Enrico Mantovani Ownership (1993–2002) ===
On 14 October 1993, Paolo Mantovani died suddenly and was replaced by his son Enrico. During his first season (1993–94), Sampdoria won one more Coppa Italia and placed fourth in Serie A. During the following four seasons, many players from his father's tenure left the club but many important acquisitions were made which kept Sampdoria in the top tier Serie A. This included the likes of Argentine internationals Juan Sebastián Verón and Ariel Ortega, and international midfielders Clarence Seedorf and Christian Karembeu. In April 1995 Sampdoria reached the semi-final stage of the Cup Winners' Cup, losing out to Arsenal on penalties after two legs.

In May 1999 Sampdoria were relegated from Serie A and did not return to the top flight until 2003.

=== Riccardo Garrone Ownership (2002–2013) ===
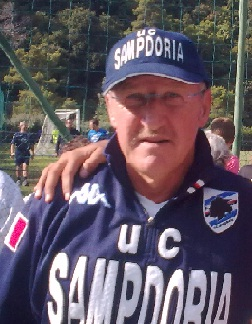
Luigi Delneri managed Sampdoria to fourth place and Champions League qualification in 2010.

In 2002 Sampdoria was acquired by Riccardo Garrone, an Italian oil businessman. Sampdoria returned to Serie A in 2003 led by talisman Francesco Flachi, and ended their first season in eighth place. After several more top-half finishes, manager Walter Novellino gave way to Walter Mazzarri in 2007.

With the signings of forwards Antonio Cassano from Real Madrid, and Giampaolo Pazzini in January 2008, Sampdoria ended the 2007–08 season in sixth position and qualified for the 2008–09 UEFA Cup. The following season, they came fourth and qualified for the UEFA Champions League play-offs under manager Luigi Delneri, who left for Juventus. With the departures also of CEO Giuseppe Marotta, and both Cassano and Pazzini, and the squad being stretched by Champions League football, Sampdoria were relegated to Serie B after a 2–1 loss at home to Palermo in May 2011. In the following season June 2012, Sampdoria won promotion back to Serie A after defeating Varese 4–2 on aggregate in the play-off final.

=== Edoardo Garrone Ownership (2013–2014) ===
In 2013, following the death of his father, Edoardo Garrone took over the presidency of Sampdoria, but his main goal was to sell it as soon as possible to free himself of the debts that the company had incurred over the previous years. The sale of Sampdoria to Massimo Ferrero was widely contested by Sampdoria fans. A sell-off, which even after years, some fans continue to reproach in 2023. In 2023, after Massimo Ferrero's arrest in 2021 and the continuous protests from the fans, he clarified that the sale was a mistake due to pressure from his family to sell Sampdoria as soon as possible. A further wrong choice defined by Garrone because it was sold to an unreliable person.

=== Massimo Ferrero Ownership (2014–2023) ===
In June 2014 the club was purchased by the film producer Massimo Ferrero. After sixth-placed rivals Genoa in the 2014–15 season failed to obtain a UEFA licence for the 2015–16 UEFA Europa League, seventh-placed Sampdoria took their spot. The club built a solid foundation in Serie A for the next seven years. Notable managerial appointments were Marco Giampaolo and Claudio Ranieri, as well as the steady flow of goals from talismanic striker Fabio Quagliarella. Growing tensions however surrounded Ferrero's presidency, fuelled by his well-known and public support of AS Roma. Several attempts were made to sell the club, including to a consortium led by club legend Gianluca Vialli. On 6 December 2021 Massimo Ferrero was arrested by Italian police as part of ongoing investigations into corporate crimes and bankruptcy. He resigned from his position as President of Sampdoria with immediate effect, whilst a club statement assured fans that the affairs of the football club were not a part of the investigations. On 27 December, former player Marco Lanna was appointed president. In January 2022 the club welcomed back former manager Marco Giampaolo after a disappointing start to the season under Roberto D'Aversa. On 6 February in his first home game back in charge, Sampdoria defeated Sassuolo 4–0. Results however began to dwindle, and after eight games and a winless start to the 2022–23 season the club parted company with Giampaolo. On 6 October former Serie A player legend Dejan Stanković was appointed to the role with the task of steering the club clear of the relegation zone. Sampdoria were later relegated in the 2022–23 season from Serie A to Serie B.

=== New owners and Serie B (2023–present) ===
In late May 2023 former Leeds United owner Andrea Radrizzani and the businessman Matteo Manfredi reached an agreement with previous owner Massimo Ferrero to buy Sampdoria and prevent it from bankruptcy. On 27 June 2023, former Italy and Serie A legend Andrea Pirlo was appointed as the manager.

The change in ownership, however, has not led to an improvement of fortunes for the club, and financial hardship continued well into the 2023–24 season: although they finished their first season back in the second tier with qualification to the promotion playoffs, they were eliminated by Palermo in the first round. The 2024–25 season was meant to feature an even stronger push for promotion with the acquisition of players like Massimo Coda and M'baye Niang, but the club started out with two losses and a draw on the first three games on the season. Results were never delivered despite four managerial changes, and as a result, Sampdoria placed 18th, which implied its first ever relegation to Serie C, the third tier of Italian football. However, Brescia's four-point deduction at the end of the regular season meant that the club was thrown one final lifeline not to drop down to Serie C, as the subsequent shuffling of placements signified that they would play a relegation play-out match against Salernitana. They went on to win the play-off 5–0, Serie B officials awarded them a 3–0 win over Salernitana in the second leg of the playoff after it was abandoned.

== Colours, badge and nicknames ==
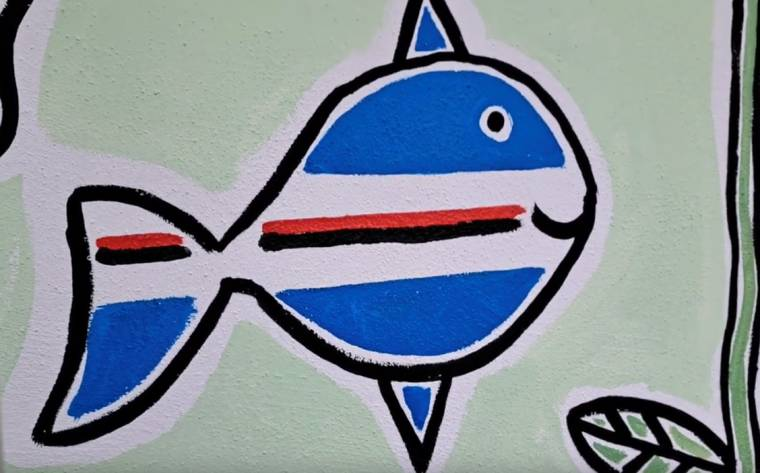
Genoa graffiti depicting a fish from Sampdoria colours by Filippo Biagioli.

The white, blue, red and black colours represent the club's origins with a merger between two teams, Sampierdarenese and Andrea Doria, who wore respectively red/black and white/blue jerseys with a shield with Saint George's Cross.

The club crest features a sailor in profile known by Genoese name of Baciccia, a diminutive of Ligurian Gio-Batta, Italian Giovanni Battista, i.e. John-Baptist. The image of a sailor is used due to Sampdoria being based in the port city of Genoa.

The precise design of the Baciccia came from a Disney-licensed comic, Topolino, in 1980.

Since 1980, the Baciccia has appeared on the shirts of Sampdoria, mostly on the chest but occasionally on the sleeve.

== Stadium ==
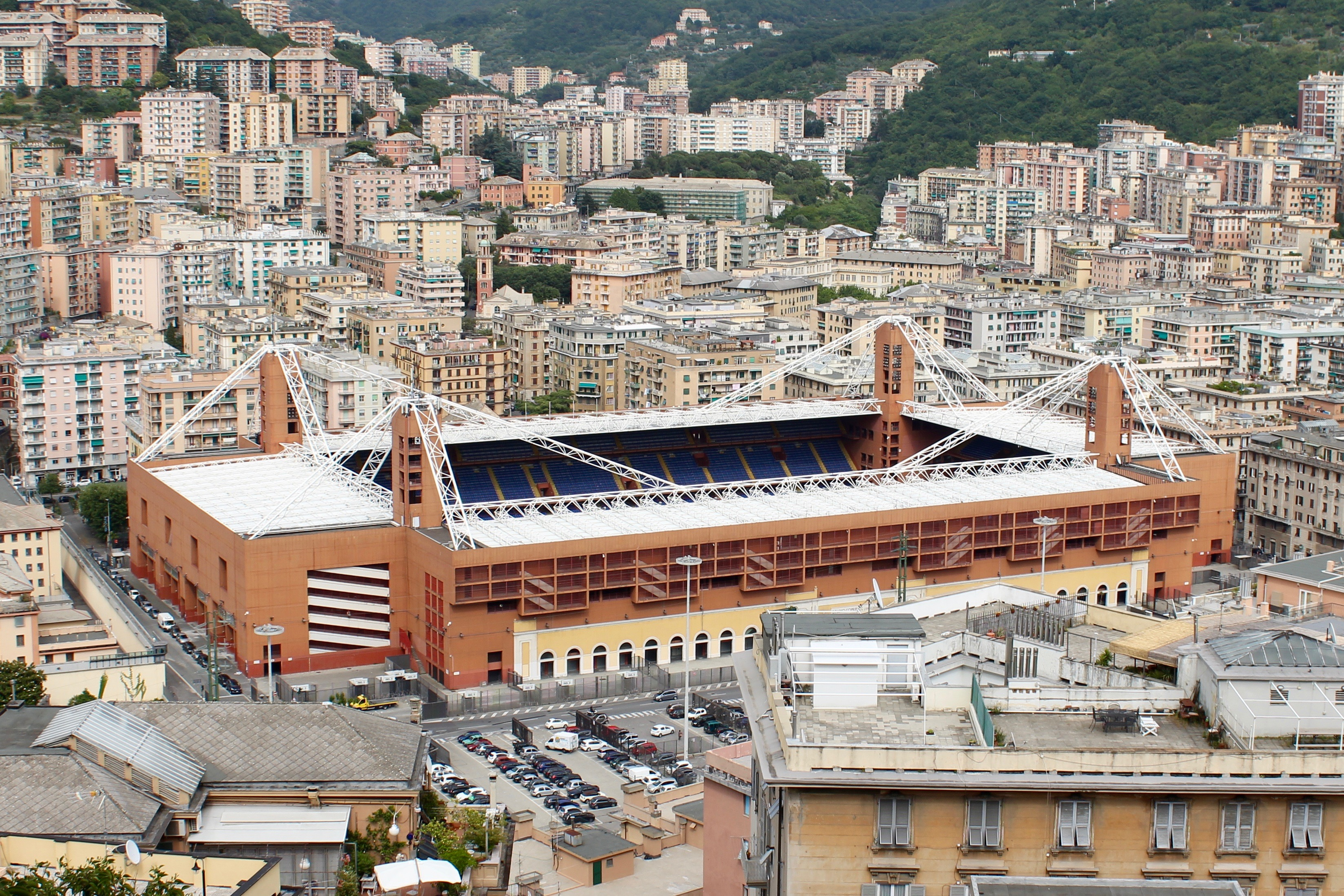
Stadio Luigi Ferraris

Since 1946, the club have played at the Stadio Luigi Ferraris, also known as the Marassi from the name of the neighbourhood where it is located, which has a capacity of 33,205. It is the ninth-largest stadium in Italy by capacity. The stadium is named after Luigi Ferraris (1887–1915), an Italian footballer, engineer and soldier who died during WWI.

The ground is shared with Sampdoria's rivals, Genoa CFC The stadium was dismantled and rebuilt before the 1990 FIFA World Cup, for which it hosted three Group C matches (between Costa Rica, Scotland and Sweden) and a round-of-16 match between the Republic of Ireland and Romania.

== Supporters and rivalries ==
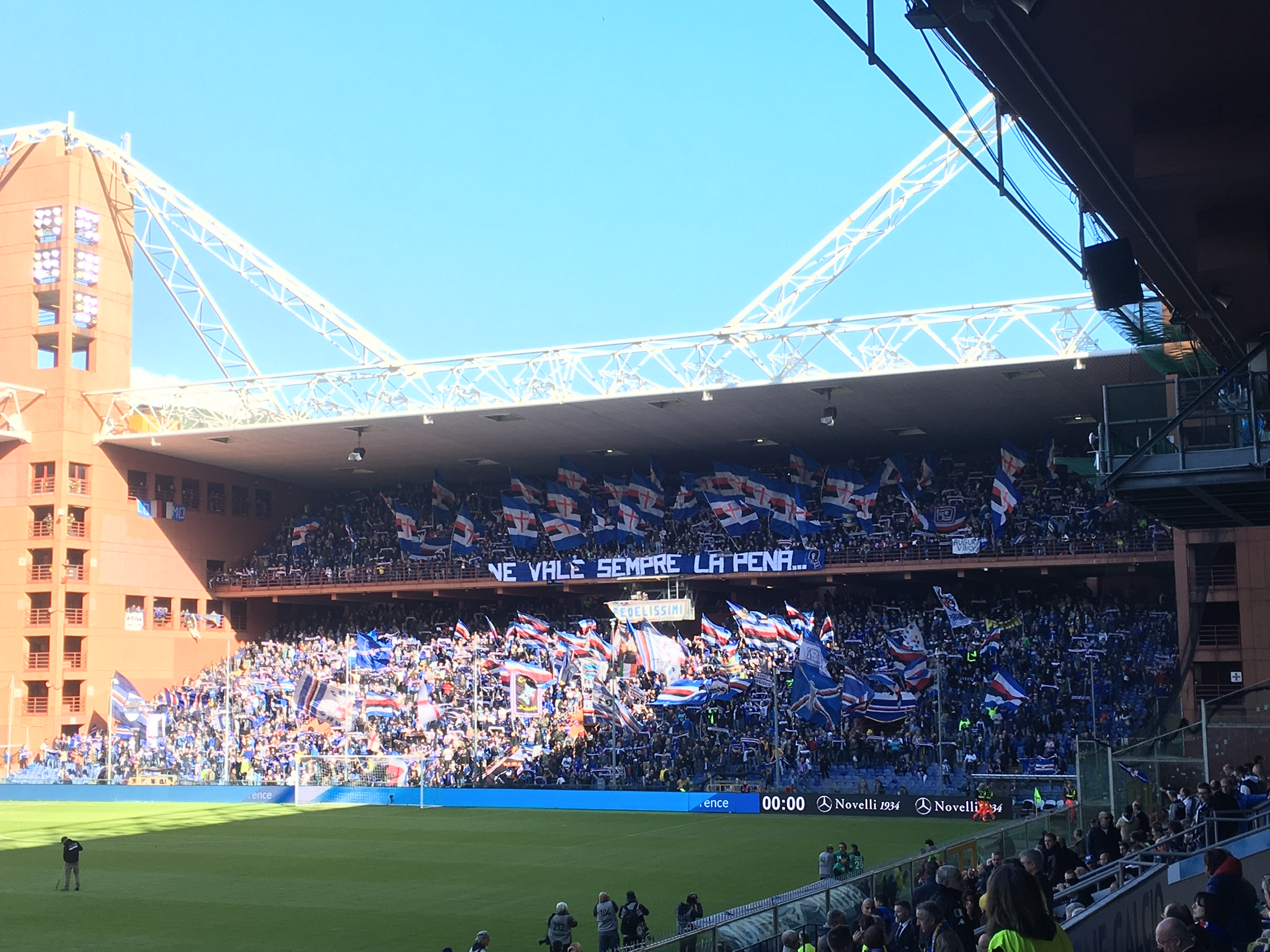
Sampdoria fans in the Gradinata Sud of the Stadio Luigi Ferraris

Sampdoria supporters come mainly from the city of Genoa. The biggest group are Ultras Tito Cucchiaroni, named after an Argentinian left winger who played for Sampdoria. The group were founded in 1969, making it one of the oldest ultra groups in Italy. They are apolitical, although there are smaller groups like Rude Boys Sampdoria, who are left-wing, but today this group is no longer active. The main support with flags and flares comes from the southern Curva, Gradinata Sud.

Sampdoria's biggest rivals are Genoa, against whom they play the Derby della Lanterna.

== Honours ==
=== Domestic ===
- Serie A
  - Winners (1): 1990–91
- Serie B
  - Winners (1): 1966–67
  - Runners-up (1): 2002–03
- Coppa Italia
  - Winners (4): 1984–85, 1987–88, 1988–89, 1993–94
  - Runners-up (3): 1985–86, 1990–91, 2008–09
- Supercoppa Italiana
  - Winners (1): 1991
  - Runners-up (3): 1988, 1989, 1994

=== European ===
- European Cup
  - Runners-up (1): 1991–92
- European Cup Winners' Cup
  - Winners (1): 1989–90
  - Runners-up (1): 1988–89
- European Super Cup
  - Runners-up (1): 1990

=== Friendly ===
- Wembley International Tournament
  - Winners (3): 1990, 1991, 1992
- Trofeo Bortolotti
  - Winners (2): 1998, 2006
- Amsterdam Tournament
  - Winners (1): 1988
- Joan Gamper Trophy
  - Winners (1): 2012

== Records and statistics ==
=== Player records ===
==== Most appearances ====
Competitive, professional matches only.

#	Name	Years	Matches
1	(Italy) Roberto Mancini	1982–1997	567
2	(Italy) Moreno Mannini	1984–1999	501
3	(Italy) Pietro Vierchowod	1983–1995	493
4	(Italy) Angelo Palombo	2002–2012, 2012–2017	459
5	(Italy) Fausto Pari	1983–1992	401
6	(Italy) Fausto Salsano	1979–1981, 1984–1990, 1993–1998	377
7	(Italy) Luca Pellegrini	1980–1991	363
8	(Italy) Guido Vincenzi	1958–1969	353
9	(Italy) Gaudenzio Bernasconi	1954–1965	351
10	(Italy) Gianluca Vialli	1984–1992	328

==== Top goalscorers ====
Competitive, professional matches only.

#	Name	Years	Goals
1	(Italy) Roberto Mancini	1982–1997	171
2	(Italy) Gianluca Vialli	1984–1992	141
3	(Italy) Francesco Flachi	1999–2007	110
4	(Italy) Fabio Quagliarella	2006–2007, 2016–2023	106
5	(Italy) Adriano Bassetto	1946–1953	89
6	(Italy) Giuseppe Baldini	1946–1950, 1953–1955	71
7	(Italy) Vincenzo Montella	1996–1999, 2007–2008	66
8	(Italy) Giancarlo Salvi	1963–1964, 1965–1976	55
9	(Italy) Eddie Firmani	1955–1958	52
9	(Italy) Manolo Gabbiadini	2013–2015, 2019–2023	52
10	(Italy) Attilio Lombardo	1989–1995, 2001–2002	51

== Players ==
=== Current squad ===
As of 10 September 2026

Note: Flags indicate national team as defined under FIFA eligibility rules; some limited exceptions apply. Players may hold more than one non-FIFA nationality.

No.	Pos.	Nation	Player
1	GK	DEN	Peter Vindahl (on loan from Sparta Prague)
2	DF	ITA	Mattia Viti
3	DF	SUI	Stefan Gartenmann
5	DF	NED	Bjorn Meijer
6	MF	SCO	Liam Henderson
7	MF	ITA	Manuel Cicconi
9	FW	NOR	Tobias Lauritsen
10	FW	ITA	Lorenzo Insigne
11	FW	SLO	Tjaš Begić
12	GK	BUL	Andrey Krastev
13	DF	ITA	Luca Ravanelli
14	FW	FRA	Yann Karamoh
15	DF	ITA	Filippo Delli Carri (on loan from Monza)
16	MF	BEL	Yari Verschaeren

No.	Pos.	Nation	Player
18	MF	ITA	Nikola Sekulov
20	MF	LUX	Danel Sinani
23	DF	ITA	Fabio Depaoli
25	DF	ITA	Alex Ferrari (captain)
28	MF	DEN	Oliver Abildgaard
29	DF	ITA	Alessandro Di Pardo
33	MF	ITA	Francesco Conti
38	DF	ITA	Karim Diop
39	FW	AZE	Lorenzo Mezzotero
43	DF	SUI	Kevin Mbabu
45	MF	CGO	Antoine Makoumbou (on loan from Samsunspor)
94	MF	ITA	Salvatore Esposito
96	GK	ITA	Samuele Massolo
99	FW	ITA	Gennaro Tutino

=== Out on loan ===
Note: Flags indicate national team as defined under FIFA eligibility rules; some limited exceptions apply. Players may hold more than one non-FIFA nationality.

No.	Pos.	Nation	Player
—	DF	ITA	Tommaso Casalino (at Pianese until 30 June 2027)
—	DF	ITA	Lorenzo Malanca (at Vado until 30 June 2027)
—	DF	ITA	Alessio Papasergio (at Turris until 30 June 2027)

No.	Pos.	Nation	Player
—	FW	ITA	Giuseppe Forte (at Fiorentina until 30 June 2027)
—	FW	ESP	Víctor Narro (at Hércules until 30 June 2027)
—	FW	ITA	Lorenzo Paratici (at Roma until 30 June 2027)

== Club officials ==
=== Organisation Chart ===
Role	Name
Owner	(Italy) Blucerchiati S.p.A.
President	(Italy) Francesco De Gennaro
Director and CEO	(Italy) Raffaele Fiorella
Director	(Italy) Maheta Molango
Acting mayor	(Italy) Alessio Iachini (Italy) Fabio Rodari
Alternate mayor	(Italy) Francesca Cirrincione (Italy) Annalisa De Palma
Operations director	(Italy) Alberto Bosco
Technical area manager	(Italy) Pietro Accardi
Technical area collaborator	(Italy) Giuseppe Colucci
Club manager	(Italy) Giovanni Invernizzi
Team manager	(Italy) Lorenzo Ariaudo
CEO of area football	(Denmark) Jesper Fredberg
Sporting director	(Italy) Andrea Mancini
General secretary	(Italy) Massimo Ienca
Sports and international affairs secretariat	(Italy) Federico Valdambrini
Secretariat	(Italy) Cristina Calvo (Italy) Cecilia Lora
Ticket office and SLO manager	(Italy) Sergio Tantillo
Sampdoria service center	(Italy) Alice Carrodani (Italy) Alberto Casagrande
“Ferraris” stadium security delegate	(Italy) Matteo Sanna
Reception and services	(Italy) Laura Bastianello (Italy) Matteo Garofalo
Administrative director	(Italy) Alberto Gambale
Administration	(Italy) Marco Pesce (Italy) Nicole Rinaldi (Italy) Alessio Rosabianca (Italy) Paolo Speziari
Communications manager	(Italy) Matteo Gamba
Communications director	(Italy) Federico Berlingheri
Press office	(Italy) Alessandro Pintimalli
Marketing and sales director	(Italy) Luca Donati
Marketing area	(Italy) Davide Insalaco (Italy) Nicoletta Sommella
Merchandising and CRM manager	(Italy) Cristian Girardi
Sampdoria women manager	(Italy) Marco Palmieri
Sampdoria women secretary	(Italy) Marcella Ghilardi
Academy manager	(Italy) Luca Silvani
Technical coordinator competitive activities	(Italy) Fabio Papagni
Technical coordinator basic activities	(Italy) Lucio Bove
Technical coordinator goalkeeping area	(Italy) Christian Puggioni
Scouting coordinator	(Italy) Marco Zibardi
Sports secretariat coordinator	(Italy) Tommaso Mattioli
Sports secretariat	(Italy) Marika Carboni (Italy) Manuela Gomiscek
Women's academy manager	(Italy) Enrico Calvi
Next generation manager	(Italy) Claudio Lucchini
Responsible against abuse, violence and discrimination	(Italy) Francesco Manzari (Italy) Tommaso Mattioli

- Last updated: 18 September 2025

=== Current technical staff ===
Role	Name
Head coach	(Italy) Bernardo Corradi
Assistant coach	(Italy) Davide Mandelli
Technical collaborator	(Italy) Andrea Faccioli
Athletic training manager	(Italy) Paolo Bertelli
Athletic trainer	(Italy) Alberto Berselli
Rehab coach	(Italy) Alessandro Giuliani
Goalkeeping coach	(Italy) Walter Bressan
Match analyst	(Italy) Marco Ferri
Health director	(Italy) Dr. Massimo Manara
Health consultant	(Italy) Dr. Luca Garriboli
Orthopedic consultant	(Italy) Dr. Claudio Mazzola
Physiotherapists	(Italy) Valerio Chiappe (Italy) Simone Mainardi (Italy) Giacomo Rigon (Italy) Fabio Sannino
Nutrition area manager	(Italy) Dr. Luca Naitana
Logistics and purchasing manager	(Italy) Amedeo Tortarolo
Kitman manager	(Italy) Paolo Zanardi
Kitman	(Italy) Andrea Arecco (Italy) Anna Bugatto (Albania) Bardul Jaiji (Italy) Leonardo Liso (Italy) Stefano Macciò (Italy) Luca Marino (Italy) Roberto Rossi

- Last updated: 1 July 2026

== Presidential history ==
Name	Period
1946	(Italy) Piero Sanguineti
1946–1948	(Italy) Amedeo Rissotto
1948–1953	(Italy) Aldo Parodi
1953–1961	(Italy) Alberto Ravano
1961–1965	(Italy) Glauco Lolli Ghetti
1965–1966	(Italy) Enrico De Franceschini
1966–1968	(Italy) Arnaldo Salatti
1968–1973	(Italy) Mario Colantuoni
1973–1974	(Italy) Giulio Rolandi
1974–1978	(Italy) Glauco Lolli Ghetti
1978–1979	(Italy) Edmondo Costa
1979–1993	(Italy) Paolo Mantovani
1993–2000	(Italy) Enrico Mantovani
2000–2002	(Italy) Enzo Garufi
2002	(Italy) Pietro Sgarlata
2002–2013	(Italy) Riccardo Garrone
2013–2014	(Italy) Edoardo Garrone
2014–2021	(Italy) Massimo Ferrero
2021–2024	(Italy) Marco Lanna
2024–	(Italy) Matteo Manfredi

== Managerial history ==
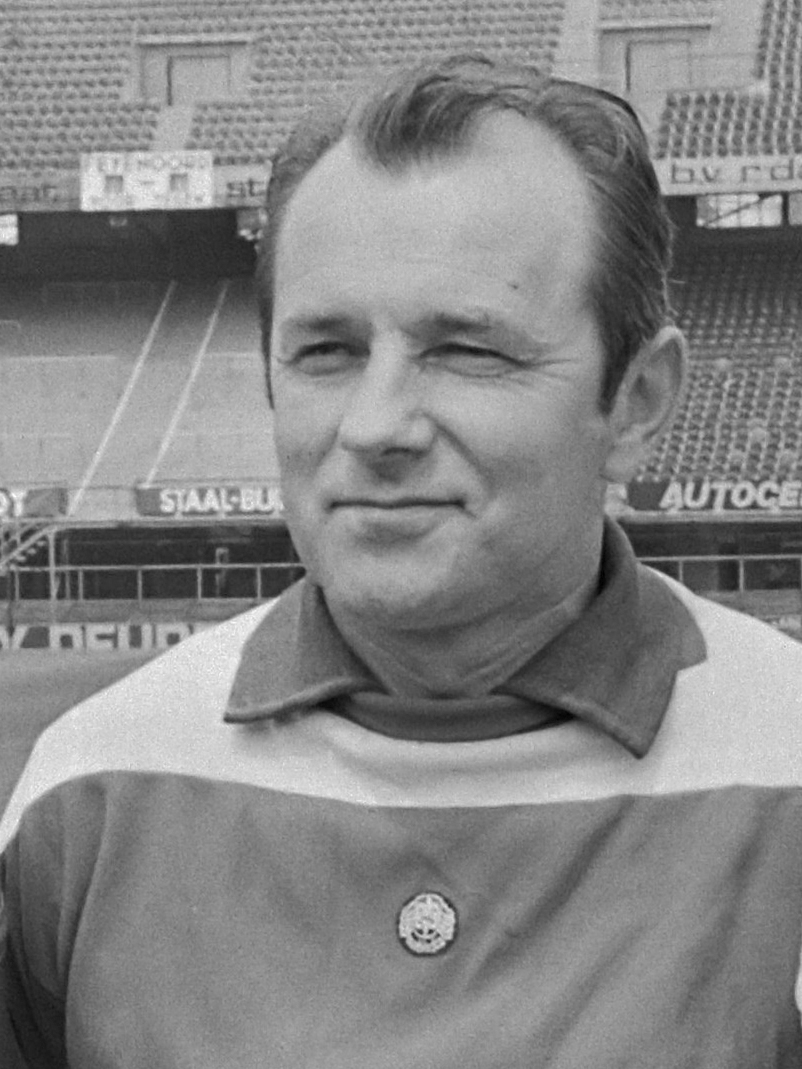
Serbian Vujadin Boškov, former Sampdoria player in the early 1960s, became the longest serving and most successful manager in the club's history, and managed the team to their only Serie A title in 1991.

Period	Name
1946–1947	(Italy) Giuseppe Galluzzi
1951	(Italy) Giovanni Rebuffo
1947–1950	(Italy) Adolfo Baloncieri
1950–1951	(Italy) Giuseppe Galluzzi
1951	(Italy) Gipo Poggi
1951–1952	(Italy) Alfredo Foni
1952	(Italy) Gipo Poggi
1952–1953	(Italy) Ivo Fiorentini
1953–1954	(Italy) Paolo Tabanelli
1954–1956	(Hungary) Lajos Czeizler
1956–1957	(Italy) Pietro Rava
1957	(Italy) Ugo Amoretti
1957–1958	(England) Bill Dodgin
1958	(Italy) Adolfo Baloncieri
1958–1962	(Italy) Eraldo Monzeglio
1962–1963	(Italy) Roberto Lerici
1963–1965	(Austria) Ernst Ocwirk
1965–1966	(Italy) Giuseppe Baldini
1966–1971	(Italy) Fulvio Bernardini
1971–1973	(Paraguay) Heriberto Herrera
1973–1974	(Italy) Guido Vincenzi
1974–1975	(Italy) Giulio Corsini
1975–1977	(Italy) Eugenio Bersellini
1977–1978	(Italy) Giorgio Canali
1978–1979	(Italy) Lamberto Giorgis
1979–1980	(Italy) Lauro Toneatto
1980–1981	(Italy) Enzo Riccomini
1981–1984	(Italy) Renzo Ulivieri
1984–1986	(Italy) Eugenio Bersellini
1986–1992	(Socialist Federal Republic of Yugoslavia) Vujadin Boškov
1992–1997	(Sweden) Sven-Göran Eriksson
1997	(Argentina) César Menotti
1997–1998	(Federal Republic of Yugoslavia) Vujadin Boškov
1998	(Italy) Luciano Spalletti
1998–1999	(England) David Platt / (Italy) Giorgio Veneri
1999	(Italy) Luciano Spalletti
1999–2000	(Italy) Gian Piero Ventura
2000–2001	(Italy) Luigi Cagni
2001–2002	(Italy) Gianfranco Bellotto
2002–2007	(Italy) Walter Novellino
2007–2009	(Italy) Walter Mazzarri
2009–2010	(Italy) Luigi Delneri
2010–2011	(Italy) Domenico Di Carlo
2011	(Italy) Alberto Cavasin
2011	(Italy) Gianluca Atzori
2011–2012	(Italy) Giuseppe Iachini
2012	(Italy) Ciro Ferrara
2012–2013	(Italy) Delio Rossi
2013–2015	(Serbia) Siniša Mihajlović
2015	(Italy) Walter Zenga
2015–2016	(Italy) Vincenzo Montella
2016–2019	(Italy) Marco Giampaolo
2019	(Italy) Eusebio Di Francesco
2019–2021	(Italy) Claudio Ranieri
2021–2022	(Italy) Roberto D'Aversa
2022	(Italy) Marco Giampaolo
2022–2023	(Serbia) Dejan Stanković
2023–2024	(Italy) Andrea Pirlo
2024	(Italy) Andrea Sottil
2024-2025	(Italy) Leonardo Semplici
2025	(Italy) Alberico Evani
2025	(Italy) Massimo Donati
2025-2026	(Italy) Angelo Gregucci
2026	(Italy) Attilio Lombardo (caretaker)
2026	(Italy) Bernardo Corradi
2026-	(Italy) Luca D'Angelo

== Recent seasons ==
The recent season-by-season performance of the club:

Season	Division	Tier	Position
1995–96	Serie A	I	8th
1996–97	Serie A	I	6th
1997–98	Serie A	I	9th
1998–99	Serie A	I	16th ↓
1999–2000	Serie B	II	5th
2000–01	Serie B	II	6th
2001–02	Serie B	II	11th
2002–03	Serie B	II	2nd ↑
2003–04	Serie A	I	8th
2004–05	Serie A	I	5th
2005–06	Serie A	I	12th
2006–07	Serie A	I	9th
2007–08	Serie A	I	6th
2008–09	Serie A	I	13th
2009–10	Serie A	I	4th
2010–11	Serie A	I	18th ↓
2011–12	Serie B	II	6th ↑
2012–13	Serie A	I	14th
2013–14	Serie A	I	12th
2014–15	Serie A	I	7th
2015–16	Serie A	I	15th
2016–17	Serie A	I	10th
2017–18	Serie A	I	10th
2018–19	Serie A	I	9th
2019–20	Serie A	I	15th
2020–21	Serie A	I	9th
2021–22	Serie A	I	15th
2022–23	Serie A	I	20th ↓
2023–24	Serie B	II	7th
2024–25	Serie B	II	17th
2025–26	Serie B	II	13th
2026–27	Serie B	II	

Key

↑ Promoted	↓ Relegated

== Divisional movements ==
Series	Years	Last	Promotions	Relegations
A	65	2022–23	-	▼5 (1966, 1977, 1999, 2011, 2023)
B	13	2025–26	▲4 (1967, 1982, 2003, 2012)	
80 years of professional football in Italy since 1946

== World Cup winners ==
- Alain Boghossian (France 1998)
- (Germany) Shkodran Mustafi (Brazil 2014)
