= US Pianese =

Italian football club

Pianese
- Full name: Unione Sportiva Pianese srl
- Nicknames: Bianconeri (the white and blacks), Zebrette (little zebras), Amiatesi or Amiatini (guys from mount Amiata)
- Founded: 1930
- Ground: Stadio Comunale, Piancastagnaio; Stadio Carlo Zecchini, Grosseto
- Capacity: 2,500
- Chairman: Maurizio Sani
- Manager: Andrea Zanchetta
- League: Serie C Group B
- 2025–26: Serie C Group B, 6th of 20
- Website: https://uspianese.it/
Home colours	Away colours	Third colours

Unione Sportiva Pianese is an Italian football club from Piancastagnaio, Tuscany. They play in Serie C, following promotion from the Serie D in 2024.

== History ==
The club was founded in 1930. They won their first promotion to Serie D in 2009–10 and, successively, their first league title in Italy's top amateur league in 2018–19, thus ensuring themselves the right to play in Serie C.

From 2006 to 2019, in compliance with Italian rules regarding amateur clubs, U.S. Pianese changed its name to U.S. Pianese A.S.D.

In February 2020, Pianese became the first professional football club to report a case of a player, King Udoh tested COVID-19 during the COVID-19 pandemic.

Early logo (dismissed in 2019)

== Current squad ==
As of 29 August 2026

Note: Flags indicate national team as defined under FIFA eligibility rules; some limited exceptions apply. Players may hold more than one non-FIFA nationality.

No.	Pos.	Nation	Player
1	GK	ITA	Gianluca Astaldi (on loan from Parma)
4	MF	ITA	Tommaso Casalino (on loan from Sampdoria)
5	MF	ITA	Lorenzo Peli
7	MF	ITA	Matteo Colombo
10	FW	ITA	Simone Ianesi
11	FW	ITA	Leonardo Bellini
12	GK	ITA	Andrea Zambuto
13	DF	ITA	Luca Ercolani
14	FW	ITA	Gabriele Negri (on loan from Sassuolo)
15	DF	ITA	Matteo Gorelli
16	DF	ITA	Francesco Chesti
17	FW	ALB	Kleidi Xhani

No.	Pos.	Nation	Player
19	DF	ITA	Gabriele Morelli
20	MF	ITA	Lorenzo Vigiani
21	MF	ITA	Manuel Tirelli
22	GK	ITA	Michele Pezzolato (on loan from Modena)
23	DF	ITA	Nicola Pintus (on loan from Cagliari)
27	MF	ITA	Marco Bertini
29	FW	ITA	Luca Fabrizi
30	MF	ITA	Francesco Proietto
56	DF	ITA	Lorenzo Masetti
77	DF	GHA	Claudio Martey
99	FW	ITA	Carlo Maria Testa

=== Out on loan ===
Note: Flags indicate national team as defined under FIFA eligibility rules; some limited exceptions apply. Players may hold more than one non-FIFA nationality.

No.	Pos.	Nation	Player
—	MF	GUI	Mamadou Balde (at Club Milano until 30 June 2027)
