= Giuseppe Galluzzi =

Italian footballer and manager

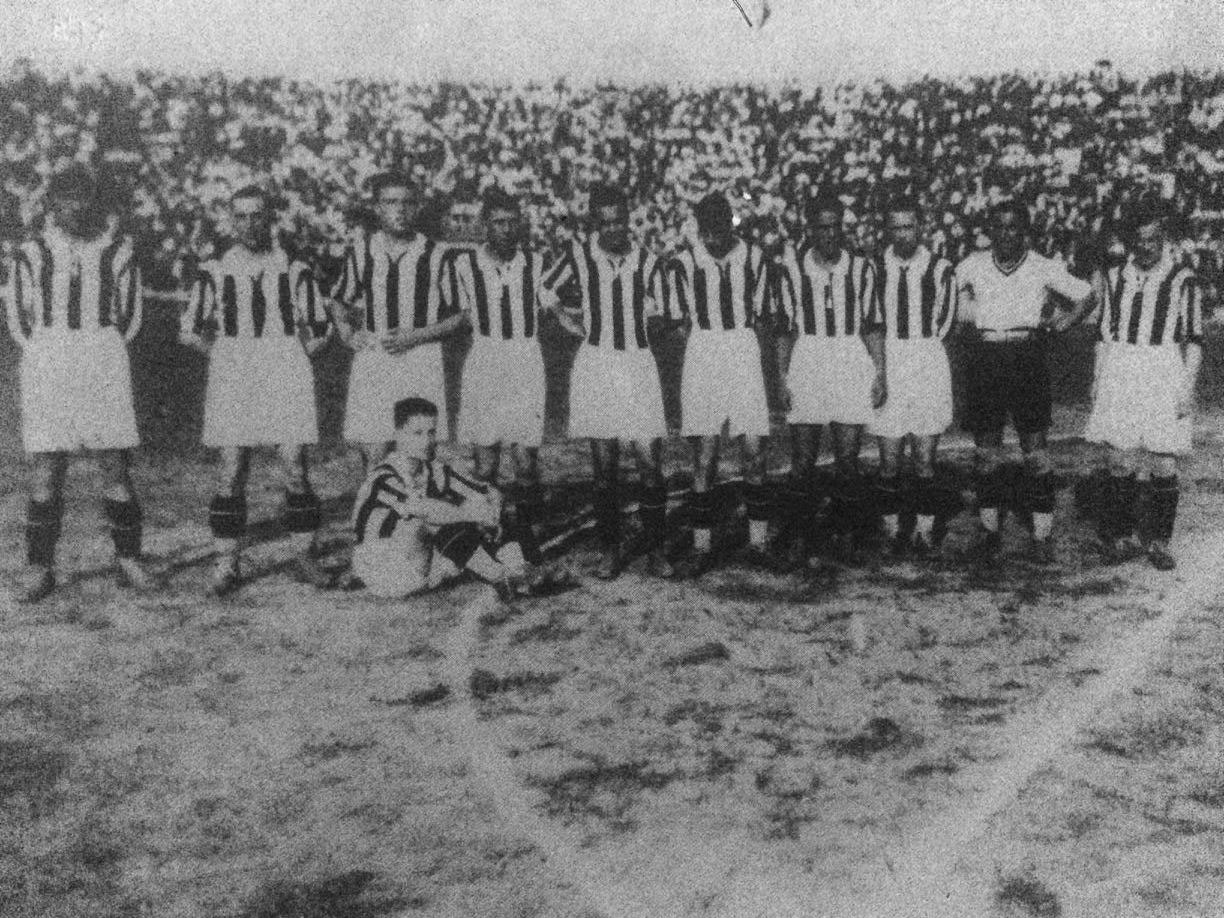
- Galluzzi (standing, fifth from left) during the 1928–1929 season

Personal information
- Date of birth: 10 November 1903
- Place of birth: Florence, Italy
- Date of death: 6 December 1973 (aged 70)
- Place of death: Florence, Italy

Senior career*
Years	Team	Apps	(Gls)
1925–1931	Legnano		
1931–1936	Fiorentina	137	(4)
1936–1939	Genoa	79	(1)
1939–1942	Fiorentina	47	(1)

Managerial career
- 1939–1945: Fiorentina
- 1946–1947: Sampdoria
- 1950: Sampdoria
- 1951–1952: Bologna
- * Club domestic league appearances and goals

Giuseppe Galluzzi (10 November 1903 – 6 December 1973) was an Italian footballer and manager from Florence, who was a prominent figure in the Florentine football scene. He appeared for CS Firenze, and then ACF Fiorentina after the merger took place.

He also went into football management, firstly as a player-manager at Fiorentina. Later, he became the first manager of Sampdoria in 1946, after the club was founded by a merger.

He died in Florence on 6 December 1973.
