= Giorgio Veneri =

Italian football manager (1939–2023)

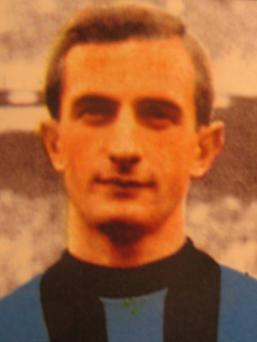
- Vereni as an Atalanta player

Personal information
- Date of birth: 10 September 1939
- Place of birth: Mantua, Italy
- Date of death: 8 November 2023 (aged 84)
- Place of death: Crema, Italy
- Height: 1.75 m (5 ft 9 in)
- Position: Midfielder

Youth career
- 195?–1958: Ozo Mantova

Senior career*
Years	Team	Apps	(Gls)
1958–1967	Atalanta	30	(2)
1967–1968	Como	4	(1)
Total		34	(3)

Managerial career
- 1976–1980: Pergocrema
- 1980–1981: Derthona
- 1981–1985: Fanfulla
- 1985–1987: Mantova
- 1987–1988: Casarano
- 1988–1989: SPAL
- 1989–1990: Legnano
- 1990–1992: Pergocrema
- 1992–1994: Fiorenzuola
- 1994–1997: AC Prato
- 1997–1998: Lette
- 1998–1999: Sampdoria
- 2002–2012: Italy U-20
- * Club domestic league appearances and goals

Giorgio Veneri (10 September 1939 – 8 November 2023) was an Italian football player and manager who played as a midfielder. He played with the club Atalanta BC, for whom he scored 2 goals in Serie A. Veneri died on 8 November 2023, at the age of 84.
