= Tommaso Casalino =

Italian footballer (born 2007)

Personal information
- Date of birth: 31 July 2007 (age 19)
- Place of birth: Genoa, Italy
- Height: 1.81 m (5 ft 11 in)
- Position: Midfielder

Team information
- Current team: Pianese (on loan from Sampdoria)
- Number: 4

Youth career
- Sampdoria

Senior career*
Years	Team	Apps	(Gls)
2025–	Sampdoria	4	(0)
2026–	→ Pianese (loan)	1	(0)
- * Club domestic league appearances and goals as of 23 August 2026

Tommaso Casalino (born 31 July 2007) is an Italian professional footballer who plays as a midfielder for Serie C Group B club Pianese, on loan from Sampdoria.

== Career ==
Born in Genoa, Casalino is a youth product of Sampdoria, joining the club as a 7 years old.

A standout with Sampdoria's Primavera, he was first called to the first team in November 2025.

Casalino made his professional debut with Sampdoria in a 3–1 Serie B loss to Venezia on 8 November 2025, coming on for Leonardo Benedetti on the 88th minute. Having turned 18 only 3 months earlier, this debut made him one of the youngest to play for the club and in this Serie B season.

He also played the following game, a home 1–0 league win against Juve Stabia.
