= Matteo Poggi =

Italian footballer and manager (1913–1992)

Ernesto Matteo Poggi, known as Gino Poggi or Poggi II (23 February 1913 - 3 January 1992), was an Italian footballer and manager of the 1950s.

== Biography ==
He then played six seasons at Ginnastica Sampierdarenese, and in 1934, won Serie B. With two seasons at AC Milan where he won nothing, he moved to la Fiorentina, where in the first year, he won Serie B in 1939, and in the second, won the Italian Cup, beating Genoa in the final. He played there until 1943.

He moved clubs in 1945, due to the Second World War, for one season, to Società Ginnastica Andrea Doria, without success. He retired at Sampdoria in 1947.

He became a football manager in the 1950s. He had two spells (50-51 and 52–53) at U.C. Sampdoria, as well as at Calcio Catania for three seasons (55–58), Genoa CFC (59–60) and AC Cesena (61–62). He never won a title as a coach.

== Clubs ==
=== As player ===
- 1928-1929 : Associazione Calcio La Dominante
- 1929-1930 : Genoa CFC
- 1930-1936 : Ginnastica Sampierdarenese
- 1936-1938 : AC Milan
- 1938-1943 : AC Fiorentina
- 1945-1946 : Società Ginnastica Andrea Doria
- 1946-1947 : U.C. Sampdoria

=== As coach ===
- 1950-1951 : U.C. Sampdoria
- 1952-1953 : U.C. Sampdoria
- 1955-1958 : Calcio Catania
- 1959-1960 : Genoa CFC
- 1961-1962 : AC Cesena

== Honours ==
- Coppa Italia
  - Winner in 1940
- Serie A
  - Runner-up in 1930
- Serie B
  - Champion in 1934 and 1939
