= Sergio Realini =

Italian footballer (1925–1990)

Personal information
- Date of birth: June 24, 1925
- Place of birth: Gavirate, Italy
- Date of death: 20 December 1990 (aged 65)
- Place of death: Treviso, Italy
- Position: Defender

Senior career*
Years	Team	Apps	(Gls)
1944–1945	Varese	9	(0)
1945–1946	Lecco	22	(0)
1946–1947	Inter Milan	10	(0)
1947–1948	Sanremese		
1948–1949	Lecce	39	(0)
1949–1950	Legnano	10	(0)
1950–1955	Treviso	152	(0)
1955–1956	Vittorio Veneto		
1956–1958	Pordenone	37	(0)
- * Club domestic league appearances and goals

Sergio Realini (June 24, 1925 – December 20, 1990) was an Italian professional football player.

He played 10 league matches for Inter Milan.
