= Stefano Di Chiara =

Italian footballer and manager

Personal information
- Date of birth: 21 February 1957 (age 69)
- Place of birth: Rome, Italy
- Position: Defender

Youth career
- Lazio

Senior career*
Years	Team	Apps	(Gls)
1973–1976	Lazio	0	(0)
1976–1979	Pistoiese	97	(0)
1979–1980	Genoa	33	(0)
1980–1981	Cagliari	6	(0)
1981–1983	Cremonese	52	(0)
1983–1987	Lecce	117	(1)
1987–1988	Messina	19	(0)
1988–1989	SPAL	10	(0)
1989–1990	L'Aquila	25	(0)
1990–1991	Ascoli	1	(0)
Total		360	(1)

Managerial career
- 1993–1994: Cerveteri
- 1994–1995: Latina
- 1995–1996: Civitavecchia
- 1996–1997: Bastia Umbra
- 1997–1998: Chieti
- 1998–1999: Siena
- 1999–2000: Fermana
- 2000–2001: Ravenna
- 2001–2002: Novara
- 2002–2003: Taranto
- 2003–2005: Legnano
- 2005–2006: Pistoiese
- 2006–2007: Cisco Roma
- 2007–2008: Viterbo
- 2009: Como
- * Club domestic league appearances and goals

Stefano Di Chiara (born 21 February 1957) is an Italian former professional footballer and manager, who played as a defender, and is the older brother of footballer Alberto Di Chiara, whom he played with during his time at Lecce, helping the club to achieve Serie A promotion for the first time in their history in 1985.

== Playing career ==
Di Chiara was born in Rome. During his career, he played for Lazio (1973–76), Pistoiese (1976–79), Genoa (1979–80), Cagliari (1980–81), Cremonese (1981–83), Lecce (1983–87), Messina (1987–1988), SPAL (1988–1989), L'Aquila (1989–90), and Ascoli (1990–91).

== Managerial career ==
Di Chiara has managed Cerveteri, Latina, Civitavecchia, Bastia Umbra, Chieti, Siena, Fermana, Ravenna, Novara, Taranto, Legnano, Pistoiese, Cisco Roma and Viterbo.

In February 2009 he was appointed as new head coach of Lega Pro Seconda Divisione club Como. After guiding the team to promotion in the higher tier, in October 2009 he was fired due to poor results in the following Lega Pro Prima Divisione 2009–10 campaign.

== Honours ==
=== Player ===
Pistoiese

- Serie C: 1976–77

Lecce

- Serie B: 1984–85
