= Ernestino Ramella =

Italian footballer and manager (born 1955)

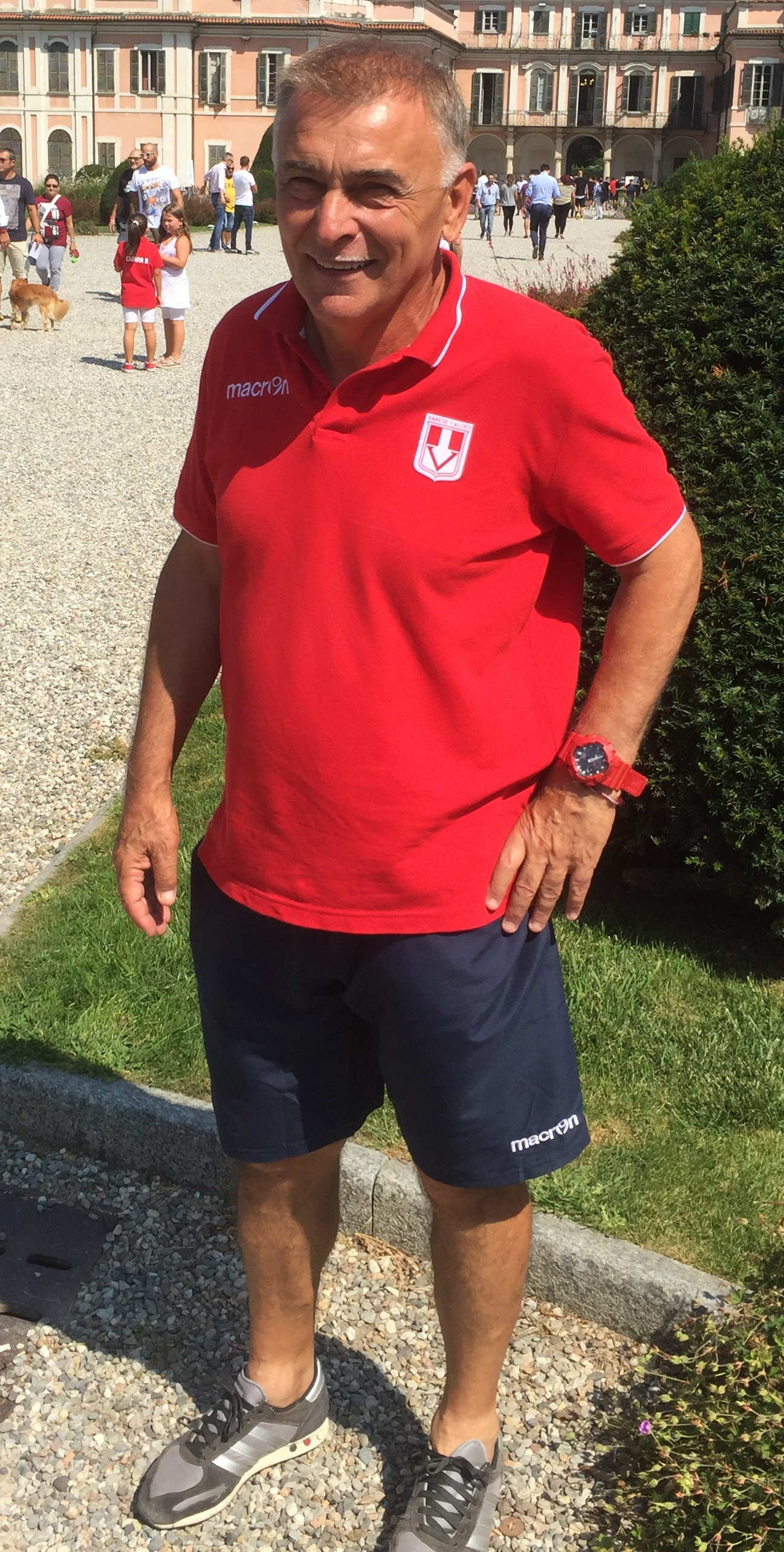
- Ramella in 2016

Personal information
- Date of birth: 7 April 1955 (age 71)
- Place of birth: Zinasco, Italy
- Height: 1.77 m (5 ft 10 in)
- Position: Striker

Youth career
- 1969–1973: Varese

Senior career*
Years	Team	Apps	(Gls)
1973–1979	Varese	141	(26)
1979–1980	Ternana	14	(0)
1980–1981	Piacenza	27	(3)
1981–1983	Novara	54	(8)
1983–1984	Pro Patria	31	(8)
1984–1985	Legnano	18	(4)
1985–1987	Montebelluna	64	(11)
1987–1991	Montebelluna	83	(16)
Total		432	(76)

Managerial career
- Varese (youth)
- 1997–1998: Solbiatese
- 1998–1999: Querétaro
- 2000–2003: Legnano
- 2005: Pachuca
- 2006–2007: Como
- 2007–2010: Solbiatese
- 2010–2011: Gallaratese
- 2011–2012: Como
- 2012: Como
- 2013: Caronnese
- 2013: FC Chiasso
- 2014–2015: Flamurtari Vlorë
- 2015–2016: Varese
- 2017–2018: América Premier
- 2019: Pavia
- * Club domestic league appearances and goals

Ernestino Ramella (born 7 April 1955) is an Italian football manager and a former player who played as a striker.
