= Luca Ercolani =

Italian professional footballer

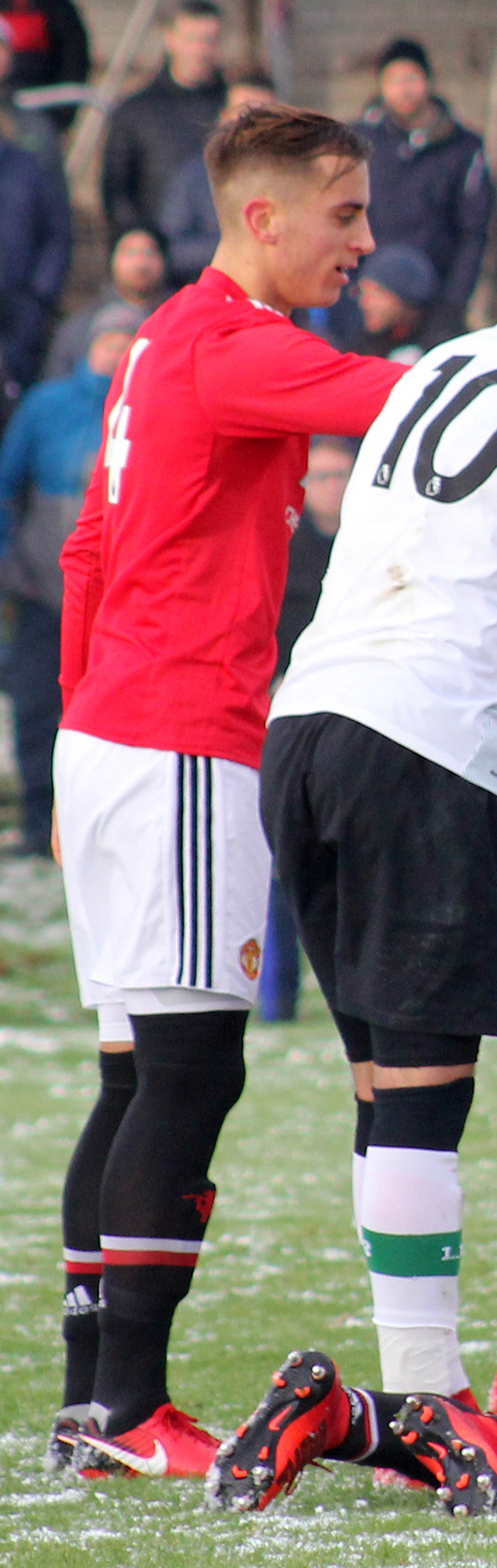

Personal information
- Date of birth: 25 November 1999 (age 26)
- Place of birth: Ravenna, Italy
- Height: 1.84 m (6 ft 0 in)
- Position: Centre-back

Team information
- Current team: Pianese
- Number: 13

Youth career
- USD Classe
- Ravenna
- Rimini
- Forlì
- Cesena
- 2016–2021: Manchester United

Senior career*
Years	Team	Apps	(Gls)
2021	Carpi	16	(0)
2021–2022	Catania	13	(0)
2022–2023	Fidelis Andria	3	(0)
2023–2024	Alessandria	18	(0)
2024–2025	Foggia	20	(2)
2025–	Pianese	45	(0)

International career
2018–2019	Italy U20	5	(0)
- * Club domestic league appearances and goals as of 30 April 2026

Luca Ercolani (born 25 November 1999) is an Italian professional footballer who plays as a centre-back for Serie C Group B club Pianese.

== Club career ==
=== Manchester United ===
Having previously been a gymnast in his early years, Ercolani soon turned his attentions to football. He started his youth career with USD Classe, before moving to Ravenna until 2012. After a stint with Rimini, Ercolani moved to Forlì. He was later signed on loan by Cesena, though I Bianconeri would choose not to sign the player. In July 2016, having been scouted by David Williams a year prior, Ercolani completed a transfer to Premier League club Manchester United. He remained with the English club until the start of 2021, appearing at U18, U19, U21 and U23 level; notably featuring in the EFL Trophy and UEFA Youth League. Ercolani did train with the first-team squad on numerous occasions under both José Mourinho and Ole Gunnar Solskjær.

During the 2019–20 season, having spent time out with an injury, Ercolani - on the advice of some of the club's coaches - completed his UEFA B coaching qualification.

=== Carpi ===
On 8 January 2021, having previously extended his Manchester United contract until June 2021 in May 2020, Ercolani returned to Italy with Serie C side Carpi; penning terms until June 2022. He made his senior debut on 20 January during an away match against Matelica, as he featured for the full duration of a 1–0 loss at Stadio Helvia Recina. Further appearances arrived that month versus Sambenedettese and Feralpisalò. Ercolani was sent off for the first time in senior football on 7 February against Imolese. Following the 2020–21 season, Carpi was excluded from the Italian leagues due to debts, making him a free agent.

=== Catania ===
On 13 August 2021, he signed a contract with Catania for the term of one season with an optional second year.

On 9 April 2022, he was released together with all of his Catania teammates following the club's exclusion from Italian football due to its inability to overcome a number of financial issues.

=== Fidelis Andria ===
On 28 July 2022, Ercolani joined Fidelis Andria.

=== Alessandria ===
On 18 August 2023, he reached an agreement with Alessandria on the basis of a one-year contract with an option for a second year.

=== Foggia ===
On 30 January 2024, Ercolani moved to Foggia.

=== Pianese ===
On 11 January 2025, he joined Pianese.

== International career ==
Ercolani won five caps for Italy at under-20 level, having made his debut in October 2018.

== Style of play ==
Ercolani started out as a striker, though later switched to play as a centre-back after joining Forlì. He is also capable of playing at full-back.

== Career statistics ==
As of 2 May 2021.

Appearances and goals by club, season and competition
Club	Season	League			Cup		League Cup		Continental		Other		Total	
Club	Season	Division	Apps	Goals	Apps	Goals	Apps	Goals	Apps	Goals	Apps	Goals	Apps	Goals
Manchester United U21	2020–21	—			—		—		—		1 (Note: Appearance in the EFL Trophy)	0	1	0
Carpi	2020–21	Serie C	16	0	0	0	—		—		0	0	16	0
Career total			16	0	0	0	—		—		1	0	17	0
