= Cerro Maggiore =

- Comune
- Comune di Cerro Maggiore
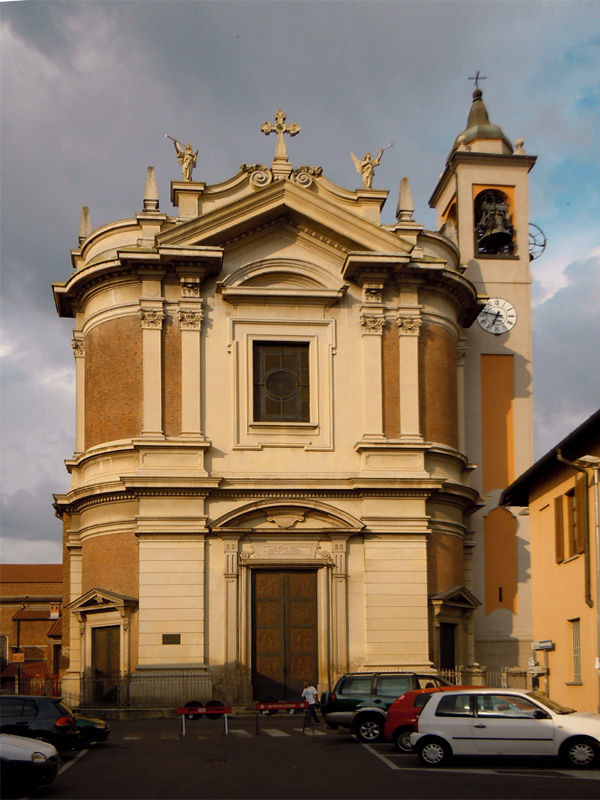
- The church of Saints Cornelio and Cipriano

- Coat of arms

- Location within Italy Location within Lombardy
- Coordinates: 45°36′N 8°57′E
- Country: Italy
- Region: Lombardy
- Metropolitan city: Milan (MI)
- Frazioni: Cantalupo

Government
  - Mayor: Giuseppina Berra

Area
  - Total: 10.12 km^{2} (3.91 sq mi)

Population (31 December 2020)
  - Total: 15,065
  - Density: 1,489/km^{2} (3,856/sq mi)
- Demonym: Cerresi
- Time zone: UTC+1 (CET)
  - Summer (DST): UTC+2 (CEST)
- Postal code: 20023
- Dialing code: 0331
- Website: Official website

Cerro Maggiore (Legnanese: Scerr [ˈʃɛr]) is a comune (municipality) in the Province of Milan in the Italian region Lombardy, located about 20 kilometres (12 mi) northwest of Milan.

On 25 August 1946 Benito Mussolini's corpse was hidden in the town, remaining here until 30 August 1957.

== History ==
The origin of the name derives from Latin cerrus which means cerro, a deciduous tree of the oak family. The adjective "Maggiore" (major) was inserted in 1862, to better identify the village by distinguishing it from the homonyms (eg Cerro al Lambro), putting them in emphasis is placed on the greater territorial and demographic extension.

The first inhabitants of these places belonged to the Celtic lineage of the Gauls, whose descent into the Valle Padana ended towards the second half of the 4th century. B.C. The Gallic presence in the territory did not correspond at all with a period of peace and prosperity. It is therefore difficult to determine the importance that this had in the development of the town.

The long and systematic work of Romanization, initiated by Rome, following the victory obtained over the Gauls in 196 BC near today's Casteggio, led to the radical removal of the marks left by Celtic civilization. In the period of Roman hegemony, in which important colonies (Legnano, Sesto Calende, Somma Lombardo, Castano, to name a few) were founded on the great roads of communication that from Mediulanum (Milan) led to the lakes and Ossola, it is impossible to distinguish the events of the smaller villages from those of the main centers.

The numerous finds of tombs, weapons, coins and tools testify, however, that the territory of Cerro, even before Christ, was intensely inhabited. In 476 AD, conventionally referred to as the beginning of the Middle Ages, the Western Roman Empire fell. The arrival in northern Italy, in the mid-sixth century. A.D. (568 AD), of the Lombards and the foundation of their kingdom, put an end to the period of institutional political instability, following the Roman collapse.

In 774 Charlemagne, overwhelmed the fragile Lombard resistance, repressed the Lombard dominion in the peninsula, inaugurating that celebrated Carolingian period which would last for over a century. The most direct consequence of the Frankish conquest on the Milanese countryside was certainly the subdivision of its territory into counties, five in number: the countryside of Seprio, Stazzona, Burgaria and Lecco; the Cerro fund was also part of the Milan countryside. The chronicles that refer to the events of the 10th century, a period in which for defense reasons, linked to the frequent raids of the Hungarians and the reprisals of the dukes aspiring to the Kingdom of Italy, many of the villages were set up, report that Cerro was fortified. However, no traces remain of the castle, equipped with solid walls and a tower, built along the old road to Uboldo.

In 1176 the Battle of Legnano, between the imperial army of Barbarossa and the coalition of Lombard armies, also featured the Cerrese territory. Some clashes probably took place in Canazza, now a Legnano district but which was part of the territory of Cerro until 1927.

Following imperial provisions, in 1185, Cerro, together with other villages affected by the same measures, was separated from the Milan countryside and aggregated to the Seprio countryside. The Seprio enjoyed its autonomy until 1287, when the Visconti, lords of Milan, stormed the fortress of Castelseprio, disposing of its demolition, together with the destruction of the village. However, the influences deriving from the mercantile development started in Milan during the years of the Visconti lordship did not produce significant effects on the Cerro fund, which persevered in its predominantly agricultural vocation. When, in the 16th century, Charles V took over the domain of Duchy of Milan, in the Lombard territory, the establishment of the fiefdom was already very extensive and, in the following two centuries, the Spanish rulers further encouraged the tendency to sell fiefs. Not even the rural community of Cerro could escape this logic, which, in the mid-seventeenth century, was purchased as a fiefdom by Count Vincenzo Ciceri.

The eighteenth and nineteenth centuries were for Cerro the centuries of agricultural development in its territory: the prevalent cultivation of wheat was flanked by that of the vine and mulberry, destined for rapid diffusion. The industrial development of the municipality dates back to the nineteenth century, focusing on the weaving of cotton. The home working system, based on the household industry, gradually gave way to the first large factories.

In 1898 the Antonio Bernocchi opened the first weaving mill of Cerro Maggiore. Alongside the textile industry, after the First World War, the first shoe factories arose; the number of employees in the leather and footwear industry was lower only than in the textile sector. Cerro Maggiore thus begins to attract industrial realities thanks to the strong promotion of Bernocchi, an industrialist of textile fashion, senator of the Kingdom, who will be one of the greatest patrons in the history of the city, and will be appointed honorary citizen.

The opening decades of the twentieth century were also for Cerro Maggiore those of the great upheavals caused by world conflicts. The Second War claimed 100 victims among the Cerresi, a high ratio considering the population of the municipality at the time ( amounted to only 7,000 units.) A supposed urban legend circulating in the village for many decades, it is now a consolidated truth that the body of the dictator Benito Mussolini was hidden in the local Capuchin Friars convent, moved from Milan after the events in piazzale Loreto and kept here until 1957, to avoid any unproper political use of the remainings.

== Twin towns ==
- Bad Neustadt an der Saale, Germany, since 2008
