= Antonio Bernocchi =

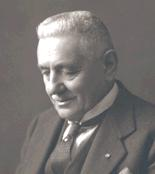
- Antonio Bernocchi in 1885
- Born: 17 January 1859; Castellanza, Varese, Italy
- Died: 8 December 1930 (aged 71); Milan, Italy
- Burial place: Cimitero Monumentale di Milano, Milan, Italy
- Occupation: Textile industry
- Parent(s): Rodolfo Bernocchi; Angela Colombo

Antonio Bernocchi (17 January 1859 – 8 December 1930) was an Italian industrialist, who built up a textile factory at Legnano, in Lombardy.

== Life ==
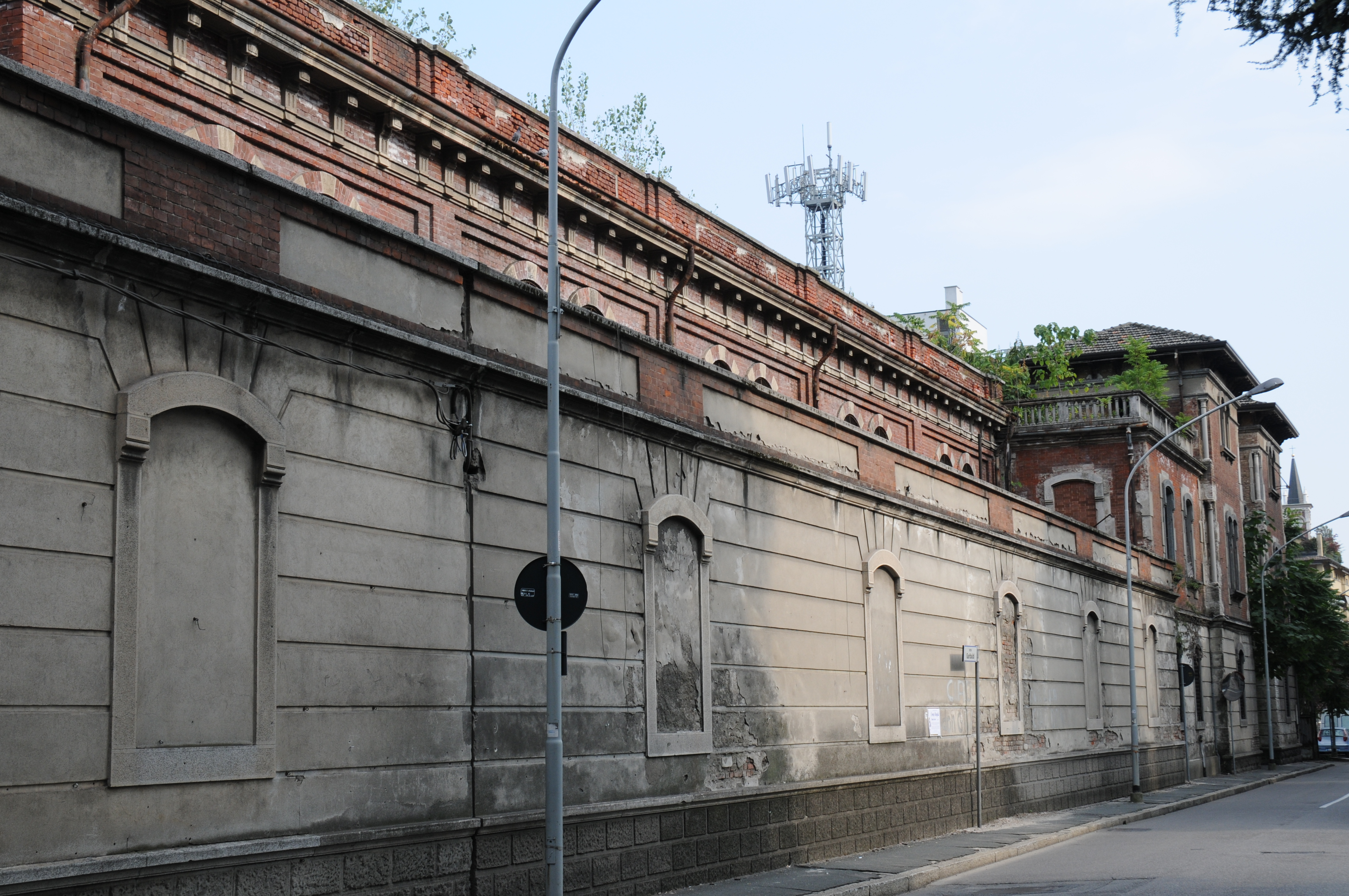
The Bernocchi factory at Legnano

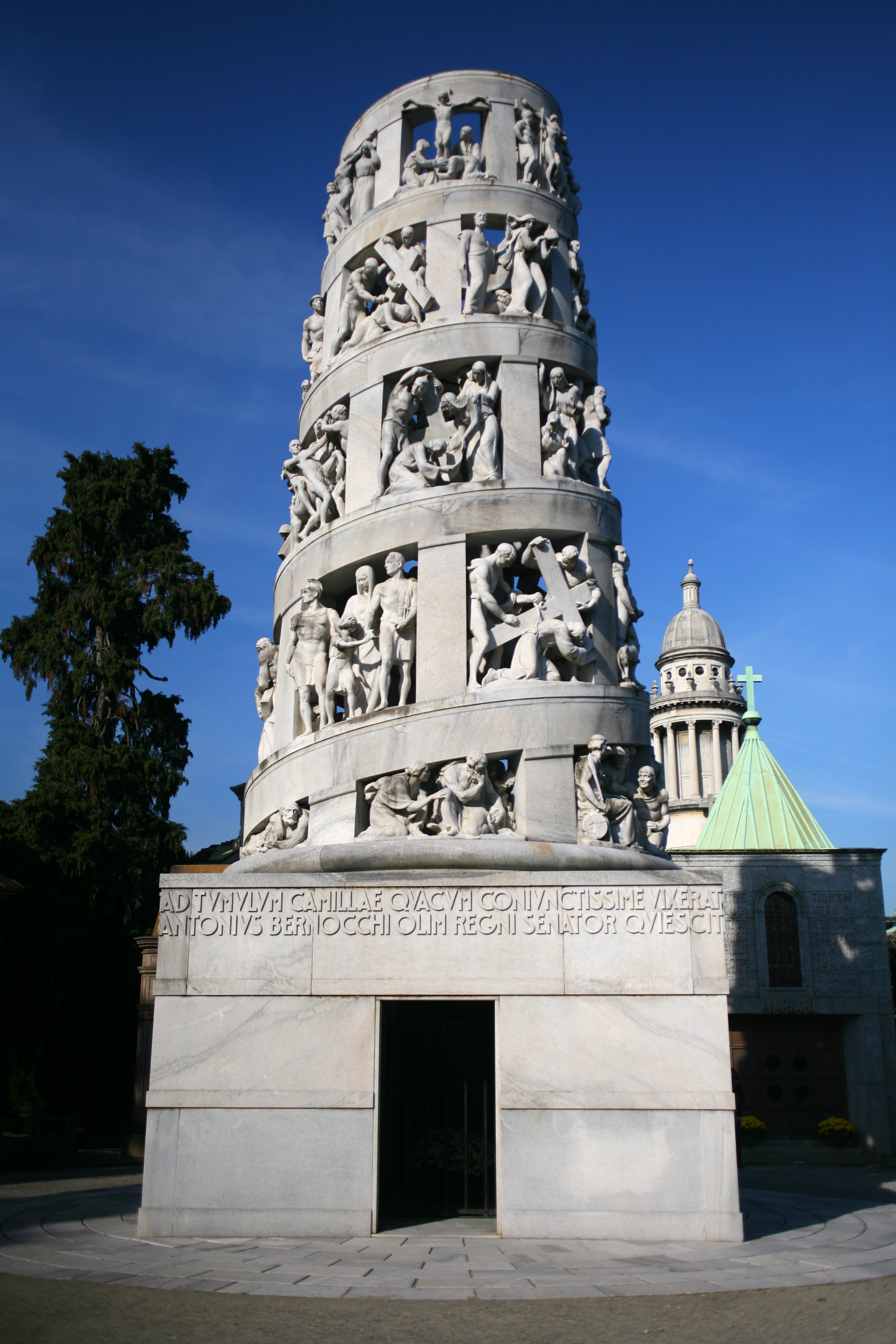
Tomb of Antonio Bernocchi in the Cimitero Monumentale di Milano, 1936

Bernocchi was born on 17 January 1859 at Castellanza in the province of Varese, in Lombardy in northern Italy. He was one of three sons of Rodolfo Bernocchi and Angela Colombo.

Bernocchi attended the Scuola Tecnica of Busto Arsizio, but did not complete his education. By the age of fifteen he was working for his father in a small textile bleaching works at Legnano. In 1898 the family started a textile business at Legnano, which was successful and grew substantially. Factories were opened at Nerviano, Cerro Maggiore and Angera. Bernocchi became sindaco (mayor) of Legnano. In 1929 he was made a Grande Ufficiale ("grand officer") of the Order of the Crown of Italy. In the same year he was made a Senator of the Kingdom of Italy. He died in Milan in the following year, on 8 December 1930. He is buried in the Cimitero Monumentale di Milano, in a large monumental tomb by the architect Alessandro Minali and the sculptor Giannino Castiglioni.

== Patronage and donations ==
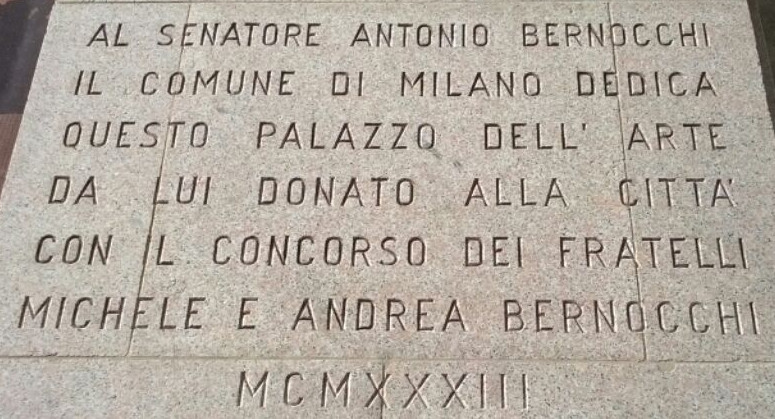
Commemorative plaque on the Palazzo dell'Arte

Bernocchi made several charitable donations. After the demoralising Italian defeat at Caporetto in November 1917 he was the first to donate to a new charitable organisation for the benefit of war veterans, La Patria Riconoscente, which would later become the Opera Nazionale Combattenti. He gave funds for the establishment or expansion of schools and hospitals in Legnano, where two schools are named after him. He was a benefactor of La Scala in Milan. His most substantial donation was a bequest of five million lire to the city of Milan for the construction of the Palazzo dell'Arte, home of the Triennale exhibition, in the Parco Sempione. The pavilion, also known as Palazzo Bernocchi, was designed by Giovanni Muzio and built between 1931 and 1933; construction was financed by Bernocchi and by his brothers Andrea and Michele.

The Coppa Bernocchi, a bicycle race held at Legnano since 1919, is dedicated to Bernocchi.
