= Gianpaolo Spagnulo =

Italian footballer

Personal information
- Date of birth: 26 September 1964 (age 62)
- Place of birth: Italy
- Position: Goalkeeper

Senior career*
Years	Team	Apps	(Gls)
–1987	S.S.D. Città di Brindisi		
1987–1991	Taranto F.C. 1927		
1991–1992	A.C. Pisa 1909		
1992–1993	Genoa C.F.C.	24	(0)
1993–1994	A.C. Pisa 1909		
1994–1995	Delfino Pescara 1936		
1995–1996	Genoa C.F.C.		
1996–1997	A.C. Perugia Calcio		
1997	Esporte Clube Vitória		
1997–1998	S.S.D. Casarano Calcio		
1998–2001	Taranto F.C. 1927		
- * Club domestic league appearances and goals

Gianpaolo Spagnulo (born 26 September 1964) is an Italian retired footballer who last played for Taranto 1927 in his home country.

== Career ==
Spagnulo started his senior career with S.S.D. Città di Brindisi. In 1992, he signed for Genoa C.F.C. in the Italian Serie A, where he made twenty-four league appearances and scored zero goals. After that, he played for A.C. Pisa 1909, Delfino Pescara 1936, A.C. Perugia Calcio, Esporte Clube Vitória, S.S.D. Casarano Calcio, and Taranto 1927.
