= 2025–26 UC Sampdoria season =

UC Sampdoria
2025–26 season
- Manager: Massimo Donati (until 18 October); Angelo Gregucci (19 October-9 March); Attilio Lombardo (caretaker, from 9 March)
- Stadium: Stadio Luigi Ferraris
- Serie B: 13th
- Coppa Italia: First Round vs Spezia
- Top goalscorer: League: Massimo Coda (9); All: Massimo Coda (9)
- Highest home attendance: 28,652 (vs Südtirol, 1 May 2026, Serie B)
- Lowest home attendance: 21,239 (vs Juve Stabia, 24 November 2025, Serie B)
- Average home league attendance: 24,068
Home colours	Away colours

The 2025–26 season was UC Sampdoria's 80th season in existence and the club's third season in Serie B, the second division of Italian football. In addition to the domestic league, UC Sampdoria will participate in this season's edition of the Coppa Italia. The season covers the period from 1 July 2025 to 30 June 2026.

== Season review ==
On 13 July, Sampdoria announced the appointment of Massimo Donati as their new head coach.

On 1 August, Sampdoria announced the season-long loan signing of Marvin Çuni from Rubin Kazan, with an option to make the transfer permanent on a contract until 30 June 2029.

On 5 August, Sampdoria announced that Melle Meulensteen had been sold to Go Ahead Eagles.

On 6 August, Sampdoria announced that Samuel Ntanda-Lukisa had been sold to RSC Anderlecht.

On 7 August, Sampdoria announced the signing of Jordan Ferri from Montpellier and Liam Henderson from Empoli, both on a contracts until 30 June 2027, with options to extended the contract for an additional year. Later the same day, Sampdoria announced that Ronaldo Vieira had been sold to MLS club San Jose Earthquakes.

On 13 August, Sampdoria announced the signing of Víctor Narro from Gimnàstic, on a contract until 30 June 2028.

On 19 August, Sampdoria announced the signing of Gaëtan Coucke from Al-Orobah, on a contract until 30 June 2027.

On 20 August, Sampdoria announced the signing of Oliver Abildgaard from Como, on a contract until 30 June 2028.

On 21 August, Sampdoria announced the season-long loan signing of Luigi Cherubini from AS Roma, and that Antonino La Gumina had joined Inter Milan on loan to play for their reserve team, Inter U23.

On 22 August, Elia Tantalocchi joined Campobasso on loan for the season. Also on 22 August, Sampdoria announced the loan signing of Simone Pafundi from Udinese, with the option to make the move permanent until 30 June 2030.

On 29 August, Sampdoria announced that Nicholas Scardigno had joined Virtus Verona, and that Nikola Sekulov had joined Carrarese, both for the season.

On 22 August, Elia Tantalocchi joined Campobasso on loan for the season. Also on 22 August, Sampdoria announced the loan signing of Simone Pafundi from Udinese, with the option to make the move permanent until 30 June 2030.

On 30 August, Sampdoria announced the signing of Andrei Coubiș from AC Milan on loan for the season, with an obligation to make the move permanent and Coubiș signing a contract until 30 June 2029.

On 1 September, Sampdoria announced that Simone Leonardi had left the club to sign for Catania, and that they had signed a one-year contract with Antonín Barák from Fiorentina and that Dennis Hadžikadunić had joined the club on a year-long loan deal from Rostov after he'd suspended his contract with the Russian club due to the Russian invasion of Ukraine.

On 2 September, Sampdoria announced that they had signed professional contracts with Giuseppe Forte, Lorenzo Paratici, until 30 June 2028 and that they had joined AS Roma on loan for the season, with Francesco Ferrara and Valerio Cinti joining Sampdoria from Roma on loan for the season.

On 18 October, Sampdoria announced the departure of Massimo Donati as their head coach, with Angelo Gregucci being announced as his replacement the following day.

On 2 January, Sampdoria announced that Estanis Pedrola had joined Las Palmas on loan for the remainder of the season, with an option to make the move permanent.

On 3 January, Sampdoria announced the signing of Matteo Brunori on loan from Palermo until the end of the season.

On 4 January, Sampdoria announced the signing of Salvatore Esposito on loan from Spezia for the remainder of the season, with an obligation to make the transfer permanent in the summer with Esposito signing a contract until 30 June 2030 with an option for an additional year.

On 5 January, Sampdoria announced the signing of Tjaš Begić from Parma on loan for the remainder of the season, with an option to make the transfer permanent on a contract until 30 June 2030.

On 7 January, Sampdoria announced the signing of Tommaso Martinelli on loan from Fiorentina until the end of the season.

On 9 January, Sampdoria announced the permanent signing of Andrei Coubiș from AC Milan, and at the same time that they had loaned Coubiș out to Universitatea Cluj for the rest of the season, with a conditional obligation to make the move permanent and a potential option if the conditional obligations isn't met.

On 14 January, Sampdoria announced the signing of Matteo Palma on loan from Udinese until the end of the season.

On 16 August, Sampdoria announced that Víctor Narro had joined Real Murcia on loan for the remainder of the season, with an option to make the move permanent.

On 17 January, Sampdoria announced the signing of Mattia Viti on loan from Nice until the end of the season.

On 22 January, Sampdoria confirmed that Lorenzo Malagrida had left the club in order to sign for Livorno.

On 26 January, Sampdoria announced that they had mutually agreed with Rubin Kazan to end Marvin Çuni's loan deal early.

On 28 January, Sampdoria announced that they had extended their contract with Francesco Conti until 30 June 2030, whilst also announcing that Simone Romagnoli had left the club to sign permanently for Empoli, and that they had signed Alessandro Di Pardo from Cagliari on a contract until 30 June 2029.

On 29 January, Sampdoria announced that Leonardo Benedetti had left the club in order to sign for Virtus Entella.

On 30 January, Sampdoria announced the signing of Manuel Cicconi on loan from Carrarese until the end of the season, with an obligation to make the mover permanent and Cicconi signing a contract until 30 June 2029.

On 31 January, Sampdoria announced that Nikolas Ioannou had left the club in order to sign permanently for Pafos.

On 2 February, Sampdoria announced the signings of Edoardo Soleri and Nicholas Pierini on loan from Spezia and Sassuolo respectively, both with the option to make the transfers permanent in the summer with Soleri signing until 30 June 2028 and Pierini signing until 30 June 2029. Sampdoria also announced that Alessandro Bellemo had joined Spezia in a similar deal to Soleri's,that Stefano Girelli had joined Casertana on loan until the end of the season, and that they had terminated their loan deal with Venezia for Giorgio Altare.

On 5 February, Sampdoria announced that Lorenzo Malanca had signed his first professional contract with the club, until 30 June 2028.

On 20 February, Sampdoria announced that Stipe Vulikić had left the club to sign for Levski Sofia.

On 9 March, Sampdoria announced the departure of Angelo Gregucci as their head coach, with Attilio Lombardo being announced as his temporary replacement.

== Squad ==
As of match played 8 May 2026

No.	Name	Nationality	Position	Date of birth (age)	Signed from	Signed in	Contract ends	Apps.	Goals
Goalkeepers
1	Simone Ghidotti	(Italy)	GK	19 March 2000 (aged 26)	Como	2025	2027	32	0
30	Nicola Ravaglia	(Italy)	GK	12 December 1988 (aged 37)	Cremonese	2020			
50	Tommaso Martinelli	(Italy)	GK	6 January 2006 (aged 20)	on loan from Fiorentina	2026	2026	16	0
98	Gaëtan Coucke	(Belgium)	GK	3 November 1998 (aged 27)	Al-Orobah	2025	2027	2	0
Defenders
2	Mattia Viti	(Italy)	DF	24 January 2002 (aged 24)	on loan from Nice	2026	2026	16	0
5	Alessandro Pio Riccio	(Italy)	DF	6 February 2002 (aged 24)	Juventus	2025	2027	45	1
13	Matteo Palma	(Germany)	DF	13 March 2008 (aged 18)	on loan from Udinese	2026	2026	11	1
17	Dennis Hadžikadunić	(Bosnia and Herzegovina)	DF	9 July 1998 (aged 27)	on loan from Rostov	2025	2026	28	0
18	Lorenzo Venuti	(Italy)	DF	12 April 1995 (aged 31)	Lecce	2024	2026	49	2
21	Simone Giordano	(Italy)	DF	21 December 2001 (aged 24)	Academy	2021	2026	59	2
23	Fabio Depaoli	(Italy)	DF	24 April 1997 (aged 29)	ChievoVerona	2019		139	11
25	Alex Ferrari	(Italy)	DF	1 July 1994 (aged 31)	Bologna	2019		98	1
29	Alessandro Di Pardo	(Italy)	DF	18 July 1999 (aged 26)	Cagliari	2026	2029	16	1
39	Lorenzo Malanca	(Italy)	DF	2 January 2007 (aged 19)	Academy	2025	2028	0	0
Midfielders
4	Jordan Ferri	(France)	MF	12 March 1992 (aged 34)	Montpellier	2025	2027(+1)	6	0
7	Manuel Cicconi	(Italy)	MF	27 June 1997 (aged 28)	on loan from Carrarese	2026	2026	16	0
8	Matteo Ricci	(Italy)	MF	27 May 1994 (aged 31)	Frosinone	2023	2026	56	1
10	Luigi Cherubini	(Italy)	MF	15 January 2004 (aged 22)	on loan from AS Roma	2025	2026	34	2
11	Tjaš Begić	(Slovenia)	MF	30 June 2003 (aged 22)	on loan from Parma	2026	2026	19	3
16	Liam Henderson	(Scotland)	MF	25 April 1996 (aged 30)	Empoli	2025	2027(+1)	31	3
20	Simone Pafundi	(Italy)	MF	14 March 2006 (aged 20)	on loan from Udinese	2025	2026	26	1
28	Oliver Abildgaard	(Denmark)	MF	10 June 1996 (aged 29)	Como	2025	2028	29	1
33	Francesco Conti	(Italy)	MF	23 October 2004 (aged 21)	Academy	2024	2030	28	2
34	Tommaso Casalino	(Italy)	MF	31 July 2007 (aged 18)	Academy	2025		4	0
72	Antonín Barák	(Czech Republic)	MF	3 December 1994 (aged 31)	Fiorentina	2025	2026	28	1
94	Salvatore Esposito	(Italy)	MF	7 October 2000 (aged 25)	on loan from Spezia	2026	2026	11	0
	Francesco Ferrara	(Italy)	MF	10 March 2007 (aged 19)	on loan from AS Roma	2025	2026	0	0
Forwards
9	Massimo Coda	(Italy)	FW	10 November 1988 (aged 37)	Genoa	2024	2026	65	17
77	Nicholas Pierini	(Italy)	FW	6 August 1998 (aged 27)	on loan from Sassuolo	2026	2026	9	2
92	Edoardo Soleri	(Italy)	FW	19 October 1997 (aged 28)	on loan from Spezia	2026	2026	13	0
99	Matteo Brunori	(Italy)	FW	1 November 1994 (aged 31)	on loan from Palermo	2026	2026	18	3
	Valerio Cinti	(Italy)	FW	10 July 2007 (aged 18)	on loan from AS Roma	2025	2026	0	0
Out on loan
3	Andrei Coubiș	(Romania)	DF	29 September 2003 (aged 22)	AC Milan	2026	2029	0	0
10	Gennaro Tutino	(Italy)	FW	20 August 1996 (aged 29)	Cosenza	2025	2028	24	5
11	Estanis Pedrola	(Spain)	FW	24 August 2003 (aged 22)	Barcelona	2024	2027	34	3
14	Alessandro Bellemo	(Italy)	MF	7 August 1995 (aged 30)	Como	2025	2027	35	1
19	Stefano Girelli	(Italy)	MF	9 January 2001 (aged 25)	Cremonese	2023		18	0
20	Antonino La Gumina	(Italy)	FW	6 March 1996 (aged 30)	Empoli	2021	2027	40	3
22	Elia Tantalocchi	(Italy)	GK	30 June 2004 (aged 21)	Academy	2021			
24	Nikola Sekulov	(Italy)	MF	18 February 2002 (aged 24)	Juventus	2025	2028	19	1
31	Stipe Vulikić	(Croatia)	DF	23 January 2001 (aged 25)	Perugia	2024	2027	28	0
70	Víctor Narro	(Spain)	FW	27 May 1999 (aged 26)	Gimnàstic	2025	2028	5	0
	Nicholas Scardigno	(Italy)	GK	24 January 2006 (aged 20)	Academy	2025		0	0
	Giuseppe Forte	(Italy)	FW	21 October 2008 (aged 17)	Academy	2025	2028	0	0
	Lorenzo Paratici	(Italy)	FW	21 July 2008 (aged 17)	Academy	2025	2028	0	0
Left during the season
4	Ronaldo Vieira	(England)	MF	19 July 1998 (aged 27)	Leeds United	2018		112	0
6	Simone Romagnoli	(Italy)	DF	9 February 1990 (aged 36)	Frosinone	2025	2026	13	0
7	Marvin Çuni	(Albania)	FW	10 July 2001 (aged 24)	on loan from Rubin Kazan	2025	2026	16	1
15	Giorgio Altare	(Italy)	DF	9 August 1998 (aged 27)	on loan from Venezia	2025	2027	14	0
17	Melle Meulensteen	(Netherlands)	MF	4 July 1999 (aged 26)	Vitesse	2024	2027	29	4
44	Nikolas Ioannou	(Cyprus)	DF	10 November 1995 (aged 30)	Como	2025	2027	47	5
80	Leonardo Benedetti	(Italy)	MF	6 June 2000 (aged 25)	Spezia	2019		59	1
92	Simone Leonardi	(Italy)	FW	18 July 2005 (aged 20)	Academy	2024			
	Samuel Ntanda-Lukisa	(Democratic Republic of the Congo)	MF	30 June 2005 (aged 20)	Sint-Truiden	2022		15	1
	Lorenzo Malagrida	(Italy)	MF	24 October 2003 (aged 22)	Academy	2023		7	0

== Transfers ==
=== In ===
Date	Position	Nationality	Name	From	Fee	Ref.
7 August 2025	MF	(France)	Jordan Ferri	Montpellier	Undisclosed	
7 August 2025	MF	(Scotland)	Liam Henderson	Empoli	Undisclosed	
13 August 2025	FW	(Spain)	Víctor Narro	Gimnàstic	Undisclosed	
19 August 2025	GK	(Belgium)	Gaëtan Coucke	Al-Orobah	Undisclosed	
20 August 2025	MF	(Denmark)	Oliver Abildgaard	Como	Undisclosed	
1 September 2025	MF	(Czech Republic)	Antonín Barák	Fiorentina	Undisclosed	
9 January 2026	DF	(Romania)	Andrei Coubiș	AC Milan	Undisclosed	
29 January 2026	DF	(Italy)	Alessandro Di Pardo	Cagliari	Undisclosed	

=== Loans in ===
Start date	Position	Nationality	Name	From	End date	Ref.
27 January 2025	DF	(Italy)	Giorgio Altare	Venezia	2 February 2026	
1 August 2025	FW	(Albania)	Marvin Çuni	Rubin Kazan	26 January 2026	
21 August 2025	MF	(Italy)	Luigi Cherubini	Roma	30 June 2026	
22 August 2025	MF	(Italy)	Simone Pafundi	Udinese	30 June 2026	
30 August 2025	DF	(Romania)	Andrei Coubiș	AC Milan	9 January 2026	
1 September 2025	DF	(Bosnia and Herzegovina)	Dennis Hadžikadunić	Rostov	30 June 2026	
2 September 2025	MF	(Italy)	Francesco Ferrara	AS Roma	30 June 2026	
2 September 2025	FW	(Italy)	Valerio Cinti	AS Roma	30 June 2026	
3 January 2026	FW	(Italy)	Matteo Brunori	Palermo	30 June 2026	
4 January 2026	MF	(Italy)	Salvatore Esposito	Spezia	30 June 2026	
5 January 2026	MF	(Slovenia)	Tjaš Begić	Parma	30 June 2026	
7 January 2026	GK	(Italy)	Tommaso Martinelli	Fiorentina	30 June 2026	
14 January 2026	DF	(Germany)	Matteo Palma	Udinese	30 June 2026	
17 January 2026	DF	(Italy)	Mattia Viti	Nice	30 June 2026	
30 January 2026	DF	(Italy)	Manuel Cicconi	Carrarese	30 June 2026	
2 February 2026	FW	(Italy)	Edoardo Soleri	Spezia	30 June 2026	
2 February 2026	FW	(Italy)	Nicholas Pierini	Sassuolo	30 June 2026	

=== Out ===
Date	Position	Nationality	Name	To	Fee	Ref.
5 August 2025	MF	(Netherlands)	Melle Meulensteen	Go Ahead Eagles	Undisclosed	
6 August 2025	MF	(Democratic Republic of the Congo)	Samuel Ntanda-Lukisa	Anderlecht	Undisclosed	
7 August 2025	MF	(England)	Ronaldo Vieira	San Jose Earthquakes	Undisclosed	
8 August 2025	MF	(Spain)	Gerard Yepes	Empoli	Undisclosed	
1 September 2025	FW	(Italy)	Simone Leonardi	Catania	Undisclosed	
22 January 2026	MF	(Italy)	Lorenzo Malagrida	Livorno	Undisclosed	
28 January 2026	DF	(Italy)	Simone Romagnoli	Empoli	Undisclosed	
29 January 2026	MF	(Italy)	Leonardo Benedetti	Virtus Entella	Undisclosed	
31 January 2026	DF	(Cyprus)	Nikolas Ioannou	Pafos	Undisclosed	
20 February 2026	DF	(Croatia)	Stipe Vulikić	Levski Sofia	Undisclosed	

=== Loans out ===
Start date	Position	Nationality	Name	To	End date	Ref.
8 August 2025	FW	(Italy)	Gennaro Tutino	Avellino	30 June 2026	
21 August 2025	FW	(Italy)	Antonino La Gumina	Inter U23	30 June 2026	
22 August 2025	GK	(Italy)	Elia Tantalocchi	Campobasso	30 June 2026	
29 August 2025	GK	(Italy)	Nicholas Scardigno	Virtus Verona	30 June 2026	
29 August 2025	MF	(Italy)	Nikola Sekulov	Carrarese	30 June 2026	
2 September 2025	FW	(Italy)	Giuseppe Forte	AS Roma	30 June 2026	
2 September 2025	FW	(Italy)	Lorenzo Paratici	AS Roma	30 June 2026	
2 January 2026	FW	(Spain)	Estanis Pedrola	Las Palmas	30 June 2026	
9 January 2026	DF	(Romania)	Andrei Coubiș	Universitatea Cluj	30 June 2026	
16 January 2026	FW	(Spain)	Víctor Narro	Real Murcia	30 June 2026	
2 February 2026	MF	(Italy)	Alessandro Bellemo	Spezia	30 June 2026	
2 February 2026	MF	(Italy)	Stefano Girelli	Casertana	30 June 2026	

=== Released ===
Date	Position	Nationality	Name	Joined	Date	Ref
30 June 2026	GK	(Italy)	Nicola Ravaglia	Carrarese	1 September 2026	
30 June 2026	DF	(Italy)	Simone Giordano	Eyüpspor		
30 June 2026	DF	(Italy)	Lorenzo Venuti			
30 June 2026	MF	(Italy)	Matteo Ricci	Ascoli	19 August 2026	
30 June 2026	FW	(Italy)	Massimo Coda	Catania	24 August 2026	

== Friendlies ==
27 July 2025	Sampdoria	8–0	Nuova Camunia	Temù
17:30 CEST (UTC+2)	Sekulov 2', 28'; Bellemo 6'; Benedetti 22'; Tutino 24'; Leonardi 50'; Forte 64'; Viscarra 81' (o.g.)	Report		Stadium: Comunale Stadium; Attendance: ~3,000; Referee: Mansour Faye

31 July 2025	Sampdoria	3–1	Sant'Angelo	Temù
17:30 CEST (UTC+2)	Coda 6', 28'; Riccio 23'	Report	Dioh 13'	Stadium: Comunale Stadium; Attendance: ~2,500; Referee: Abou El Ella

6 August 2025	Sampdoria	0–0	Novara	Bogliasco
17:30 CEST (UTC+2)		Report		Stadium: Mugnaini stadium Referee: Burlando

10 August 2025	Sampdoria	1–0	Pontedera	Bogliasco
17:00 CEST (UTC+2)	Çuni 7'	Report		Stadium: Mugnaini stadium Referee: Dasso

22 January 2026	Sampdoria	6–0	Golfo Paradiso	Bogliasco
CEST (UTC+2)	Ioannou 8'; Coda 35'; Pafundi 37'; Cherubini 55'; Ricci 77'; Amarandei 90'	Report		Stadium: Mugnaini stadium

== Competitions ==
=== Overall record ===
Competition	First match	Last match	Starting round	Final position	Record							
Competition	First match	Last match	Starting round	Final position	Pld	W	D	L	GF	GA	GD	Win %
Serie B	25 August 2025	8 May 2026	Matchday 1	13th	38	11	11	16	33	47	−14	28.95
Coppa Italia	18 August 2025	18 August 2025	First Round	First Round	1	0	1	0	1	1	+0	0.00
Total					39	11	12	16	34	48	−14	28.21

Last updated: 8 May 2026
Source: Competitions

=== Serie B ===
==== League table ====
Pos	Team	Pld	W	D	L	GF	GA	GD	Pts
11	Cesena	38	12	10	16	45	56	−11	46 (Note: Head-to-head points: Mantova 9, Padova 4, Cesena 4. Head-to-head goal difference: Padova −1, Cesena −3.)
12	Carrarese	38	10	14	14	47	52	−5	44 (Note: Carrarese finished ahead of Sampdoria on head-to-head goal difference: Sampdoria 3–2 Carrarese, Carrarese 2–0 Sampdoria.)
13	Sampdoria	38	11	11	16	35	48	−13	44
14	Virtus Entella	38	10	12	16	36	51	−15	42
15	Empoli	38	9	14	15	47	54	−7	41

Source: Serie BKT
Rules for classification: 1) Points; 2) Head-to-head points; 3) Head-to-head goal difference; 4) Goal difference; 5) Goals scored; 6) Draw.
(Note: Head-to-head record is used only after all the matches between the teams in question have been played)

==== Results summary ====
Overall								Home						Away					
Pld	W	D	L	GF	GA	GD	Pts	W	D	L	GF	GA	GD	W	D	L	GF	GA	GD
38	11	11	16	35	48	−13	44	9	5	5	22	18	+4	2	6	11	13	30	−17

Last updated: 8 May 2026.
Source: Results

==== Results by round ====
Matchday	1	2	3	4	5	6	7	8	9	10	11	12	13	14	15	16	17	18	19	20	21	22	23	24	25	26	27	28	29	30	31	32	33	34	35	36	37	38
Ground	H	A	H	A	A	H	H	A	H	A	H	A	H	A	H	A	A	H	A	H	A	H	A	H	H	A	H	A	L	H	A	H	H	A	H	A	H	A
Result	L	L	L	L	D	D	W	L	D	D	L	L	W	L	W	L	D	W	L	D	D	W	W	D	W	L	L	D	L	D	L	W	W	W	L	D	W	L
Position	16	20	20	20	20	20	18	18	19	19	20	20	18	18	19	19	17	14	16	17	18	14	14	14	12	13	15	13	15	14	15	15	13	12	13	12	12	13

Updated to match(es) played on 8 May 2026. Source: Results
A = Away; H = Home; W = Win; D = Draw; L = Loss; P = Postponed
Notes:
- ^{1}

==== Results ====
25 August 2025 1	Sampdoria	0–2	Modena	Genoa
20:30 CEST (UTC+2)	Pafundi (yellow card) 79'	Report	Zampano (yellow card) 37'; Di Mariano (yellow card) 61'; Santoro 74'; Zanimacchia (yellow card) 83' (goal) 90'; Beyuku (yellow card) 86'	Stadium: Stadio Luigi Ferraris; Attendance: 24,811; Referee: Marco Piccinini

31 August 2025 2	Südtirol	3–1	Sampdoria	Bolzano
19:00 CEST (UTC+2)	Casiraghi 8'; Merkaj 19'; Adamonis (yellow card) 29'; El Kaouakibi 31'	Report	Depaoli (yellow card) 62'; Pedrola (yellow card) 85'; Coda 90'	Stadium: Stadio Druso; Attendance: 4,002; Referee: Michael Fabbri

13 September 2025 3	Sampdoria	1–2	Cesena	Genoa
19:30 CEST (UTC+2)	Vulikić (yellow card) 10'; Pio Riccio (yellow card) 24'; Henderson (yellow card) 57'; Depaoli (yellow card) 86'; Ioannou 90+2'	Report	Castagnetti 37'; Zaro 53'; Shpendi (yellow card) 71'; Berti (yellow card) 82'	Stadium: Stadio Luigi Ferraris; Attendance: 23,745; Referee: Maurizio Mariani

20 September 2025 4	AC Monza	1–0	Sampdoria	Monza
17:15 CEST (UTC+2)	Izzo (yellow card) 4'; Ciurria (red card) 55'; Álvarez 59'	Report	Vulikić (yellow card) 7'; Barák (penalty missed) 29'; Cherubini (red card) 31'; Henderson (yellow card) 54'	Stadium: Stadio Brianteo; Attendance: 7,668; Referee: Rosario Abisso

27 September 2025 5	Bari	1–1	Sampdoria	Bari
19:30 CEST (UTC+2)	Moncini 32'; Dickmann (yellow card) 53'; Sibilli (yellow card) 87'	Report	Çuni (yellow card) 5'; Henderson (yellow card) 7'; Depaoli (yellow card) 19' (goal) 28'; Benedetti (yellow card) 51'	Stadium: Stadio San Nicola; Attendance: 13,845; Referee: Matteo Marchetti

1 October 2025 6	Sampdoria	0–0	Catanzaro 1929	Genoa
20:30 CEST (UTC+2)		Report	Cissè (yellow card) 72'	Stadium: Stadio Luigi Ferraris; Attendance: 22,495; Referee: Federico Dionisi

5 October 2025 7	Sampdoria	4–1	Pescara	Genoa
17:15 CEST (UTC+2)	Vulikić (yellow card) 31'; Coda 56' (pen.); Pio Riccio (yellow card) 59'; Pafundi 63'; Depaoli 66'; Ioannou 90+1'	Report	Oliveri 44'; Brosco (yellow card) 70' (red card) 90+3'	Stadium: Stadio Luigi Ferraris; Attendance: 23,039; Referee: Luca Pairetto

17 October 2025 8	Virtus Entella	3–1	Sampdoria	Chiavari
20:30 CEST (UTC+2)	Debenedetti 32' (yellow card) 74'; Franzoni 39' (pen.); Nichetti (yellow card) 70'; Tiritiello 83'; Dalla Vecchia (yellow card) 90+2'	Report	Abildgaard (yellow card) 48'; Coda 81'	Stadium: Stadio Comunale; Attendance: 5,535; Referee: Marco Di Bello

25 October 2025 9	Sampdoria	1–1	Frosinone	Genoa
15:00 CEST (UTC+2)	Coda 69'	Report	A.Oyono (yellow card) 22'; Zilli 38'; J.Gelli (yellow card) 58'; Vergani (yellow card) 85'	Stadium: Stadio Luigi Ferraris; Attendance: 22,675; Referee: Niccolò Turrini

28 October 2025 10	Empoli	1–1	Sampdoria	Empoli
20:30 CET (UTC+1)	Elia (yellow card) 58' (red card) 65'; Popov 77'; Belardinelli (yellow card) 90+8'	Report	Benedetti (yellow card) 62'; Çuni 80'; Ferri (red card) 90+8'	Stadium: Stadio Carlo Castellani; Attendance: 5,947; Referee: Marco Piccinini

2 November 2025 11	Sampdoria	0–1	Mantova	Genoa
19:30 CET (UTC+1)	Henderson (yellow card) 1'; Ioannou (yellow card) 70'	Report	Ruocco 87'	Stadium: Stadio Luigi Ferraris; Attendance: 22,321; Referee: Giuseppe Mucera

8 November 2025 12	Venezia	3–1	Sampdoria	Venice
19:30 CET (UTC+1)	Busio 24'; Hainaut 34'; Haps (yellow card) 46'; Fila 77'	Report	Henderson (yellow card) 21' (goal) 67'; Depaoli (yellow card) 31'; Ioannou (yellow card) 42'; Giordano (yellow card) 76'; Ferri (yellow card) 86'	Stadium: Stadio Pier Luigi Penzo; Attendance: 9,005; Referee: Claudio Giuseppe Allegretta

24 November 2025 13	Sampdoria	1–0	Juve Stabia	Genoa
20:30 CET (UTC+1)	Depaoli (yellow card) 58'; Coda 58' (pen.)	Report	Ruggero (yellow card) 38' (yellow-red card) 56'; Gabrielloni (yellow card) 58'; Giorgini (yellow card) 88'; De Pieri (yellow card) 90+8'	Stadium: Stadio Luigi Ferraris; Attendance: 21,239; Referee: Luca Zufferli

30 November 2025 14	Spezia	1–0	Sampdoria	La Spezia
17:15 CET (UTC+1)	Bandinelli (yellow card) 31'; Artistico 51'; Beruatto (yellow card) 83'	Report	Benedetti (yellow card) 7'; Pafundi (yellow card) 22'; Vulikić (yellow card) 64'	Stadium: Stadio Alberto Picco; Attendance: 8,774; Referee: Daniele Chiffi

7 December 2025 15	Sampdoria	3–2	Carrarese	Genoa
19:30 CET (UTC+1)	Henderson (yellow card) 10' (goal) 36'; Coda 18', 82' (pen.) (yellow card) 87'; Ferrari (yellow card) 43'; Cherubini (yellow card) 84'; Depaoli (yellow card) 90+2'; Benedetti (yellow card) 90+4'; Ioannou (yellow card) 90+5'	Report	Abiuso 2', 26'; Illanes (yellow card) 38'; Torregrossa (yellow card) 87'; Schiavi (yellow card) 90+8'	Stadium: Stadio Luigi Ferraris; Attendance: 22,707; Referee: Simone Sozza

12 December 2025 16	Palermo	1–0	Sampdoria	Palermo
19:30 CET (UTC+1)	Le Douaron 29'	Report		Stadium: Stadio Renzo Barbera; Attendance: 25,512; Referee: Ivano Pezzuto

20 December 2025 17	Padova	1–1	Sampdoria	Padua
15:00 CET (UTC+1)	Fusi (yellow card) 35' (goal) 65'; Gómez (yellow card) 67'	Report	Coda 19'; Henderson (yellow card) 24'; Conti (yellow card) 30'	Stadium: Stadio Euganeo; Attendance: 8,271; Referee: Giovanni Ayroldi

27 December 2025 18	Sampdoria	2–1	Reggiana	Genoa
15:00 CET (UTC+1)	Depaoli (yellow card) 20'; Conti 26'; Hadžikadunić (yellow card) 45+2'; Barák 88'; Ferrari (yellow card) 90+4'	Report	Portanova 14'; Reinhart (yellow card) 24'; Rover (yellow card) 52'; Lambourde (yellow card) 76'	Stadium: Stadio Luigi Ferraris; Attendance: 24,716; Referee: Giuseppe Collu

10 January 2026 19	Avellino	2–1	Sampdoria	Avellino
15:00 CET (UTC+1)	Palumbo 31' (yellow card) 90+6'; Fontanarosa (yellow card) 44'; Tutino 51'; Patierno (yellow card) 90'	Report	Conti (yellow card) 22'; Barák (yellow card) 53'; Ioannou (yellow card) 78'; Coda 85' (pen.)	Stadium: Stadio Partenio-Adriano Lombardi; Attendance: 8,500; Referee: Valerio Crezzini

16 January 2026 20	Sampdoria	1–1	Virtus Entella	Genoa
20:30 CET (UTC+1)	Cherubini 34'; Ioannou (yellow card) 71'; Henderson (yellow card) 72'	Report	Di Mario (yellow card) 52'; Parodi 74'	Stadium: Stadio Luigi Ferraris; Attendance: 23,769; Referee: Juan Luca Sacchi

25 January 2026 21	Catanzaro	0–0	Sampdoria	Catanzaro
17:15 CET (UTC+1)	Cassandro (yellow card) 32'; Petriccione (yellow card) 42'; Frosinini (yellow card) 65'	Report	Henderson (yellow card) 62'; Abildgaard (yellow card) 85'	Stadium: Stadio Nicola Ceravolo; Attendance: 8,290; Referee: Simone Sozza

31 January 2026 22	Sampdoria	1–0	Spezia	Genoa
19:30 CET (UTC+1)	Henderson (yellow card) 35'; Hadžikadunić (yellow card) 47'; Palma (red card) 85'; Ricci 90' (yellow card) 90+1'	Report	Cassata (yellow card) 30'; Artistico (yellow card) 34'; Valoti (yellow card) 38'; Hristov (yellow card) 50'; Vlahović (red card) 85'	Stadium: Stadio Luigi Ferraris; Attendance: 23,112; Referee: Marco Di Bello

7 February 2026 23	Modena	1–2	Sampdoria	Modena
15:00 CET (UTC+1)	Zampano (yellow card) 58'; Gliozzi 75'	Report	Brunori 54'; Conti (yellow card) 64'; Martinelli (yellow card) 70'; Pio Riccio (yellow card) 86'; Begić 90' (yellow card) 90+1'; Soleri (yellow card) 90+4'	Stadium: Stadio Alberto Braglia; Attendance: 11,855; Referee: Ivano Pezzuto

10 February 2026 24	Sampdoria	3–3	Palermo	Genoa
19:00 CET (UTC+1)	Begić 50' (yellow card) 59'; Pierini 53'; Cherubini 68' (yellow card) 69'; Barák (yellow card) 80'	Report	Bani (yellow card) 1'; Gomes (yellow card) 40'; Abildgaard 45+2' (o.g.); Ranocchia (yellow card) 71'; Le Douaron (yellow card) 77'; Augello 78'; Ceccaroni 90+2'	Stadium: Stadio Luigi Ferraris; Attendance: 22,768; Referee: Davide Di Marco

14 February 2026 25	Sampdoria	1–0	Padova	Genoa
15:00 CET (UTC+1)	Ricci (yellow card) 22'; Henderson (yellow card) 25'; Brunori 34' (pen.)	Report	Villa (yellow card) 19'	Stadium: Stadio Luigi Ferraris; Attendance: 24,653; Referee: Luca Zufferli

21 February 2026 26	Mantova	2–1	Sampdoria	Mantua
15:00 CET (UTC+1)	Kouda (yellow card) 50'; Bragantini 65', 78'; Buso (yellow card) 89'	Report	Begić 14'; Di Pardo (yellow card) 45+2'; Hadžikadunić (yellow card) 58'	Stadium: Stadio Danilo Martelli; Attendance: 8,728; Referee: Kevin Bonacina

27 February 2026 27	Sampdoria	0–2	Bari	Genoa
21:00 CET (UTC+1)	Palma (yellow card) 40'; Henderson (yellow card) 45'; Brunori (yellow card) 45+3'; Esposito (yellow card) 74'	Report	Artioli (yellow card) 11'; Moncini 26'; Traoré (yellow card) 63'; Çuni (yellow card) 84'; Bellomo 90' (yellow card) 90+1'	Stadium: Stadio Luigi Ferraris; Attendance: 24,242; Referee: Daniele Perenzoni

4 March 2026 28	Juve Stabia	1–1	Sampdoria	Castellammare di Stabia
20:00 CET (UTC+1)	Correia 89'	Report	Martinelli (yellow card) 58'; Di Pardo 90+3'	Stadium: Stadio Romeo Menti; Attendance: 4,494; Referee: Giuseppe Collu

8 March 2026 29	Frosinone	3–0	Sampdoria	Frosinone
15:00 CET (UTC+1)	Fiori 25' (yellow card) 61'; Oyono (yellow card) 36'; Raimondo 49'; Corrado 64'	Report	Esposito (yellow card) 48'	Stadium: Stadio Benito Stirpe; Attendance: 12,783; Referee: Federico La Penna

14 March 2026 30	Sampdoria	0–0	Venezia	Genoa
19:30 CET (UTC+1)	Begić (yellow card) 70'; Conti (yellow card) 80'	Report		Stadium: Stadio Luigi Ferraris; Attendance: 22,441; Referee: Ermanno Feliciani

18 March 2026 31	Carrarese	2–0	Sampdoria	Carrara
20:00 CET (UTC+1)	Hasa 63'; Rubino (yellow card) 67'; Finotto 90+5' (pen.)	Report	Palma (yellow card) 45+2'; Esposito (yellow card) 67' (yellow-red card) 84'; Pafundi (yellow card) 90+2'	Stadium: Stadio dei Marmi; Attendance: 5,220; Referee: Rosario Abisso

22 March 2026 32	Sampdoria	2–1	Avellino	Genoa
17:15 CET (UTC+1)	Brunori (yellow card) 32' (goal) 72'; Pafundi (yellow card) 45'; Palma 80'; Giordano (yellow card) 90+3'	Report	Pandolfi (yellow card) 26'; Palmiero (yellow card) 42'; Sounas (yellow card) 64'; Biasci 84'; Russo (yellow card) 88'	Stadium: Stadio Luigi Ferraris; Attendance: 25,105; Referee: Daniele Chiffi

6 April 2026 33	Sampdoria	1–0	Empoli	Genoa
17:15 CEST (UTC+2)	Pierini 58'; Begić (yellow card) 76'; Soleri (yellow card) 90'	Report	Moruzzi (yellow card) 80'; Haas (yellow card) 87'	Stadium: Stadio Luigi Ferraris; Attendance: 26,624; Referee: Ivano Pezzuto

11 April 2026 34	Pescara	1–2	Sampdoria	Pescara
15:00 CEST (UTC+2)	Valzania (yellow card) 32'; Bettella (yellow card) 42'; Di Nardo 45+3' (pen.); Meazzi (yellow card) 83'	Report	Viti (yellow card) 21'; Pierini (yellow card) 27'; Ricci (yellow card) 76'; Conti 82'; Depaoli 90+3' (yellow card) 90+4'	Stadium: Stadio Adriatico – Giovanni Cornacchia; Attendance: 16,587; Referee: Marco Piccinini

17 April 2026 35	Sampdoria	0–3	AC Monza	Genoa
20:30 CEST (UTC+2)	Pierini (yellow card) 52'	Report	Cutrone 5'; Caso 13'; Lucchesi (yellow card) 15'; Petagna 85' (yellow card) 86'	Stadium: Stadio Luigi Ferraris; Attendance: 28,171; Referee: Gianluca Manganiello

25 April 2026 36	Cesena	0–0	Sampdoria	Cesena
19:30 CEST (UTC+2)	Frabotta (yellow card) 90+4'	Report	Cherubini (yellow card) 30'; Hadžikadunić (yellow card) 57'; Abildgaard (yellow card) 64'	Stadium: Stadio Dino Manuzzi; Attendance: 13,683; Referee: Paride Tremolada

1 May 2026 37	Sampdoria	1–0	Südtirol	Genoa
15:00 CEST (UTC+2)	Abildgaard 31'; Palma (yellow card) 53'; Conti (yellow card) 90+3'	Report	Molina (yellow card) 30'; Črnigoj (yellow card) 62'	Stadium: Stadio Luigi Ferraris; Attendance: 28,652; Referee: Matteo Marchetti

8 May 2026 38	Reggiana	1–0	Sampdoria	Reggio Emilia
20:30 CEST (UTC+2)	Gondo (yellow card) 43'; Reinhart (yellow card) 75'; Novakovich 76'	Report	Depaoli (yellow card) 32'	Stadium: Mapei Stadium – Città del Tricolore; Attendance: 11,514; Referee: Marco Guida

=== Coppa Italia ===
18 August 2025 First Round	Spezia	1–1 (4–2 p)	Sampdoria	La Spezia
18:30 CEST (UTC+2)	Artistico 36'	Report	Ferri (yellow card) 6'; Benedetti (yellow card) 14'; Henderson 34'; Conti (yellow card) 85'	Stadium: Stadio Alberto Picco; Attendance: 7,502; Referee: Luca Zufferli
	Penalties
	Soleri (penalty scored); Kouda (penalty scored); Hristov (penalty scored); Esposito (penalty scored)		Henderson (penalty missed); Çuni (penalty scored); Narro (penalty scored); Pedrola (penalty missed)

== Squad statistics ==
As of match played 8 May 2026

=== Appearances and goals ===
No.	Pos	Nat	Player	Total		Serie B		Coppa Italia	
No.	Pos	Nat	Player	Apps	Goals	Apps	Goals	Apps	Goals
1	GK	(Italy) ITA	Simone Ghidotti	21	0	20	0	1	0
2	DF	(Italy) ITA	Mattia Viti	16	0	16	0	0	0
4	MF	(France) FRA	Jordan Ferri	6	0	2+3	0	1	0
5	DF	(Italy) ITA	Alessandro Pio Riccio	18	0	10+7	0	1	0
7	MF	(Italy) ITA	Manuel Cicconi	16	0	10+6	0	0	0
8	MF	(Italy) ITA	Matteo Ricci	21	1	9+12	1	0	0
9	FW	(Italy) ITA	Massimo Coda	29	9	19+9	9	1	0
10	MF	(Italy) ITA	Luigi Cherubini	35	2	25+10	2	0	0
11	MF	(Slovenia) SLO	Tjaš Begić	19	3	15+4	3	0	0
13	DF	(Germany) GER	Matteo Palma	11	1	9+2	1	0	0
14	MF	(Italy) ITA	Alessandro Bellemo	11	0	6+4	0	1	0
16	MF	(Scotland) SCO	Liam Henderson	31	3	27+3	2	1	1
17	DF	(Bosnia and Herzegovina) BIH	Dennis Hadžikadunić	28	0	25+3	0	0	0
18	DF	(Italy) ITA	Lorenzo Venuti	16	0	13+3	0	0	0
20	FW	(Italy) ITA	Simone Pafundi	26	1	11+15	1	0	0
21	DF	(Italy) ITA	Simone Giordano	19	0	12+7	0	0	0
23	DF	(Italy) ITA	Fabio Depaoli	26	3	18+7	3	1	0
24	MF	(Italy) ITA	Nikola Sekulov	1	0	0	0	1	0
25	DF	(Italy) ITA	Alex Ferrari	13	0	8+4	0	1	0
28	MF	(Denmark) DEN	Oliver Abildgaard	29	1	28+1	1	0	0
29	DF	(Italy) ITA	Alessandro Di Pardo	16	1	16	1	0	0
33	MF	(Italy) ITA	Francesco Conti	28	2	18+9	2	0+1	0
34	MF	(Italy) ITA	Tommaso Casalino	4	0	0+4	0	0	0
50	GK	(Italy) ITA	Tommaso Martinelli	16	0	16	0	0	0
72	MF	(Czech Republic) CZE	Antonín Barák	28	1	10+18	1	0	0
77	FW	(Italy) ITA	Nicholas Pierini	9	2	7+2	2	0	0
92	FW	(Italy) ITA	Edoardo Soleri	13	0	2+11	0	0	0
94	MF	(Italy) ITA	Salvatore Esposito	11	0	10+1	0	0	0
98	GK	(Belgium) BEL	Gaëtan Coucke	2	0	2	0	0	0
99	FW	(Italy) ITA	Matteo Brunori	18	3	16+2	3	0	0
Players away on loan:
11	FW	(Spain) ESP	Estanis Pedrola	8	0	1+6	0	0+1	0
70	FW	(Spain) ESP	Víctor Narro	5	0	0+4	0	0+1	0
Players who appeared for Sampdoria but left during the season:
7	FW	(Albania) ALB	Marvin Çuni	16	1	6+9	1	0+1	0
31	DF	(Croatia) CRO	Stipe Vulikić	14	0	10+3	0	1	0
44	DF	(Cyprus) CYP	Nikolas Ioannou	19	2	10+8	2	0+1	0
80	MF	(Italy) ITA	Leonardo Benedetti	14	0	8+5	0	1	0

=== Goal scorers ===
Place	Position	Nation	Number	Name	Serie B	Coppa Italia	Total
1	FW	(Italy)	9	Massimo Coda	9	0	9
2	MF	(Slovenia)	11	Tjaš Begić	3	0	3
2	FW	(Italy)	99	Matteo Brunori	3	0	3
2	DF	(Italy)	23	Fabio Depaoli	3	0	3
2	MF	(Scotland)	16	Liam Henderson	2	1	3
6	DF	(Cyprus)	44	Nikolas Ioannou	2	0	2
6	MF	(Italy)	10	Luigi Cherubini	2	0	2
6	FW	(Italy)	77	Nicholas Pierini	2	0	2
6	MF	(Italy)	33	Francesco Conti	2	0	2
10	FW	(Italy)	20	Simone Pafundi	1	0	1
10	FW	(Albania)	7	Marvin Çuni	1	0	1
10	MF	(Czech Republic)	72	Antonín Barák	1	0	1
10	MF	(Italy)	8	Matteo Ricci	1	0	1
10	DF	(Italy)	29	Alessandro Di Pardo	1	0	1
10	DF	(Germany)	13	Matteo Palma	1	0	1
10	MF	(Denmark)	28	Oliver Abildgaard	1	0	1
Total					35	1	36

=== Clean sheets ===
Place	Position	Nation	Number	Name	Serie B	Coppa Italia	Total
1	GK	(Italy)	50	Tommaso Martinelli	7	0	7
2	GK	(Italy)	1	Simone Ghidotti	2	0	2
Total					9	0	9

=== Disciplinary record ===
Number	Nation	Position	Name	Serie B		Coppa Italia		Total	
Number	Nation	Position	Name	Booked	Sent off (straight red)	Booked	Sent off (straight red)	Booked	Sent off (straight red)
2	(Italy)	DF	Mattia Viti	1	0	0	0	1	0
4	(France)	MF	Jordan Ferri	1	1	1	0	2	1
5	(Italy)	DF	Alessandro Pio Riccio	3	0	0	0	3	0
8	(Italy)	MF	Matteo Ricci	3	0	0	0	3	0
9	(Italy)	FW	Massimo Coda	1	0	0	0	1	0
10	(Italy)	MF	Luigi Cherubini	3	1	0	0	3	1
11	(Slovenia)	MF	Tjaš Begić	4	0	0	0	4	0
13	(Germany)	DF	Matteo Palma	3	1	0	0	3	1
16	(Scotland)	MF	Liam Henderson	12	0	0	0	12	0
17	(Bosnia and Herzegovina)	DF	Dennis Hadžikadunić	4	0	0	0	4	0
20	(Italy)	MF	Simone Pafundi	4	0	0	0	4	0
21	(Italy)	DF	Simone Giordano	2	0	0	0	2	0
23	(Italy)	DF	Fabio Depaoli	9	0	0	0	9	0
25	(Italy)	DF	Alex Ferrari	2	0	0	0	2	0
28	(Denmark)	MF	Oliver Abildgaard	3	0	0	0	3	0
29	(Italy)	DF	Alessandro Di Pardo	1	0	0	0	1	0
33	(Italy)	MF	Francesco Conti	5	0	1	0	6	0
50	(Italy)	GK	Tommaso Martinelli	2	0	0	0	2	0
72	(Czech Republic)	MF	Antonín Barák	2	0	0	0	2	0
77	(Italy)	FW	Nicholas Pierini	2	0	0	0	2	0
92	(Italy)	FW	Edoardo Soleri	2	0	0	0	2	0
94	(Italy)	MF	Salvatore Esposito	4	1	0	0	4	1
99	(Italy)	FW	Matteo Brunori	2	0	0	0	2	0
Players away on loan:
11	(Spain)	FW	Estanis Pedrola	1	0	0	0	1	0
Players who left Sampdoria during the season:
7	(Albania)	FW	Marvin Çuni	1	0	0	0	1	0
31	(Croatia)	DF	Stipe Vulikić	4	0	0	0	4	0
44	(Cyprus)	DF	Nikolas Ioannou	5	0	0	0	5	0
80	(Italy)	MF	Leonardo Benedetti	4	0	1	0	5	0
Total				90	4	3	0	93	4
