= 2023–24 Carrarese Calcio 1908 season =

Carrarese
2023–24 season
- Manager: Antonio Calabro
- Stadium: Stadio dei Marmi
- Serie C Group B: 3rd (promoted via play-offs)
- Promotion play-offs: Winners
- Coppa Italia Serie C: Second round
- Top goalscorer: League: Giuseppe Panico (10); All: Giuseppe Panico (11)
- Biggest win: Carrarese 5–1 Torres; Carrarese 5–1 Sestri Levante
- Biggest defeat: Recanatese 4–1 Carrarese

The 2023–24 season was the 116th season in the history of Carrarese Calcio 1908 and the third consecutive season in Serie C. In the Coppa Italia Serie C, the team were eliminated in the first round by Pontedera 1–0.

== Players ==
=== First-team squad ===
As of 2 February 2024

Note: Flags indicate national team as defined under FIFA eligibility rules; some limited exceptions apply. Players may hold more than one non-FIFA nationality.

| No. | Pos. | Nation | Player |
|---|---|---|---|
| 1 | GK | ITA | Marco Bleve (on loan from Lecce) |
| 3 | DF | ITA | Marco Imperiale |
| 4 | DF | ARG | Julián Illanes (on loan from Avellino) |
| 5 | MF | ITA | Simone Della Latta |
| 6 | MF | ITA | Francesco Cerretelli (on loan from Cremonese) |
| 7 | DF | ITA | Davide Grassini |
| 8 | MF | ITA | Riccardo Palmieri |
| 10 | FW | ITA | Giuseppe Panico (on loan from Crotone) |
| 11 | MF | ITA | Manuel Cicconi |
| 12 | GK | ITA | Thomas Tampucci |
| 13 | DF | ITA | Pierluigi Pinto |
| 15 | DF | ITA | Matteo Di Gennaro |
| 17 | MF | ITA | Emanuele Zuelli (on loan from Pisa) |

| No. | Pos. | Nation | Player |
|---|---|---|---|
| 18 | MF | ARG | Nicolás Schiavi |
| 21 | DF | ITA | Mauro Coppolaro (on loan from Modena) |
| 22 | GK | ITA | Stefano Mazzini |
| 24 | FW | ITA | Leonardo Morosini |
| 28 | FW | ITA | Alessandro Capello |
| 29 | DF | ITA | Elia Maccherini Tonini (on loan from Brescia) |
| 32 | FW | ITA | Mattia Finotto |
| 39 | FW | ITA | Niccolò Belloni |
| 66 | DF | FRA | Jordan Boli (on loan from Empoli) |
| 72 | DF | ITA | Simone Zanon |
| 82 | MF | ITA | Leonardo Capezzi |
| 99 | FW | ITA | Niccolò Giannetti |

=== Out on loan ===
Note: Flags indicate national team as defined under FIFA eligibility rules; some limited exceptions apply. Players may hold more than one non-FIFA nationality.

| No. | Pos. | Nation | Player |
|---|---|---|---|
| — | DF | ITA | Raffaele Cartano (at Brescia until 30 June 2024) |
| — | DF | ITA | Francesco Folino (at Juve Stabia until 30 June 2024) |

| No. | Pos. | Nation | Player |
|---|---|---|---|
| — | DF | ITA | Alessandro Raimo (at Recanatese until 30 June 2024) |
| — | FW | NGR | Malik Olalekan Opoola (at Brindisi until 30 June 2024) |

== Transfers ==
=== In ===
| Pos. | Player | Transferred from | Fee | Date | Source |
|---|---|---|---|---|---|
| FW | (Italy) Giuseppe Panico | (Italy) Crotone | Loan | 11 July 2023 | |
| MF | (Italy) Leonardo Morosini | (Italy) Virtus Entella | Free | 17 August 2023 | |
| MF | (Italy) Emanuele Zuelli | (Italy) Pisa | Loan | 23 August 2023 | |
| DF | (Italy) Matteo Di Gennaro | (Italy) Feralpisalò | Free | 25 August 2023 | |
| MF | (Italy) Leonardo Capezzi | (Italy) Perugia | Free | 1 September 2023 | |
| MF | (Italy) Francesco Cerretelli | (Italy) Cremonese | Loan | 2 September 2023 | |
| FW | (Italy) Niccolò Giannetti | Unattached | Free | 3 October 2023 | |
| DF | (Italy) Elia Maccherini Tonini | (Italy) Brescia | Loan | 17 January 2024 | |
| DF | (France) Jordan Boli | (Italy) Empoli U19 | Free | 1 February 2024 | |

== Pre-season and friendlies ==
Win Draw Loss

| 3 August 2023 Friendly | Carrarese | Cancelled | Sestri Levante | Carrara |
| 18:00 CEST (UTC+2) | | | | Stadium: Stadio dei Marmi |
Note: The match was cancelled.

| 9 August 2023 Friendly | Carrarese | 2–0 | Lavagnese |
| --:-- CEST (UTC+2) |

| 13 August 2023 Friendly | Carrarese | 1–0 | Aglianese |
| --:-- CEST (UTC+2) |

| 18 August 2023 Friendly | Pisa | 1–0 | Carrarese |
| --:-- CEST (UTC+2) |

== Competitions ==
=== Overall record ===
| Competition | First match | Last match | Starting round | Final position | Record | | | | | | | |
| Competition | First match | Last match | Starting round | Final position | Pld | W | D | L | GF | GA | GD | Win % |
|---|---|---|---|---|---|---|---|---|---|---|---|---|
| Serie C Group B | 1 September 2023 | 28 April 2024 | Matchday 1 | 3rd | 38 | 21 | 10 | 7 | 54 | 30 | +24 | 55.26 |
| Promotion play-offs | 14 May 2024 | 9 June 2024 | National phase first round | Winners | 8 | 3 | 4 | 1 | 10 | 7 | +3 | 37.50 |
| Coppa Italia Serie C | 4 October 2023 | | First round | First round | 1 | 0 | 0 | 1 | 0 | 1 | −1 | 0.00 |
| Total | | | | | 47 | 24 | 14 | 9 | 64 | 38 | +26 | 51.06 |

Last updated: 9 June 2024
Source: Competitions

=== Serie C ===
==== League table ====
| Pos | Team | Pld | W | D | L | GF | GA | GD | Pts | Qualification |
|---|---|---|---|---|---|---|---|---|---|---|
| 1 | Cesena (C, P) | 38 | 30 | 6 | 2 | 80 | 19 | +61 | 96 | Promotion to Serie B and Supercoppa di Serie C |
| 2 | Torres | 38 | 22 | 9 | 7 | 56 | 38 | +18 | 75 | National play-offs 2nd round |
| 3 | Carrarese (O, P) | 38 | 21 | 10 | 7 | 54 | 30 | +24 | 73 | National play-offs 1st round |
| 4 | Perugia | 38 | 17 | 12 | 9 | 44 | 35 | +9 | 63 | Group play-offs 2nd round |
| 5 | Gubbio | 38 | 16 | 11 | 11 | 50 | 38 | +12 | 59 | Group play-offs 1st round |

Updated to match(es) played on 28 April 2024. Source: Lega Pro, Soccerway (in English)
Rules for classification: 1) Points; 2) Head-to-head points; 3) Head-to-head goal difference; 4) Goal difference; 5) Goals scored; 6) Lower goals against; 7) Wins; 8) Lower losses; 9) Away wins; 10) Lower home losses.
(Note: Head-to-head record is used only after all the matches between the teams in question have been played)
(C) Champions; (O) Play-off winners; (P) Promoted

==== Results summary ====
| Overall | | | | | | | | Home | | | | | | Away | | | | | |
| Pld | W | D | L | GF | GA | GD | Pts | W | D | L | GF | GA | GD | W | D | L | GF | GA | GD |
|---|---|---|---|---|---|---|---|---|---|---|---|---|---|---|---|---|---|---|---|
| 38 | 21 | 10 | 7 | 54 | 30 | +24 | 73 | 16 | 2 | 1 | 37 | 10 | +27 | 5 | 8 | 6 | 17 | 20 | −3 |

Source: Worldfootball

==== Results by round ====
| Round | 1 | 2 | 3 | 4 | 5 | 6 | 7 | 8 | 9 | 10 | 11 | 12 | 13 | 14 | 15 | 16 | 17 | 18 | 19 | 20 | 21 | 22 | 23 | 24 | 25 | 26 | 27 | 28 | 29 | 30 | 31 | 32 | 33 | 34 | 35 | 36 | 37 | 38 |
|---|---|---|---|---|---|---|---|---|---|---|---|---|---|---|---|---|---|---|---|---|---|---|---|---|---|---|---|---|---|---|---|---|---|---|---|---|---|---|
| Ground | H | A | H | A | A | H | A | H | A | H | A | H | A | H | A | H | A | H | A | A | H | A | H | H | A | H | A | H | A | H | A | H | A | H | A | H | A | H |
| Result | W | W | W | L | D | W | L | W | L | D | L | W | W | W | D | D | L | W | W | D | L | D | W | W | W | W | D | W | D | W | D | W | D | W | L | W | W | W |
| Position | 1 | 1 | 1 | 4 | 3 | 3 | 4 | 4 | 5 | 5 | 5 | 5 | 4 | 3 | 3 | 4 | 5 | 4 | 3 | 3 | 5 | 4 | 4 | 4 | 3 | 3 | 3 | 3 | 3 | 3 | 3 | 3 | 3 | 3 | 3 | 3 | 3 | 3 |

Source: Worldfootball
A = Away; H = Home; W = Win; D = Draw; L = Loss

==== Matches ====
| 1 September 2023 1 | Carrarese | 3–0 | Fermana | Carrara |
| | | | | Stadium: Stadio dei Marmi |

| 9 September 2023 2 | Arezzo | 1–3 | Carrarese | Arezzo |
| | | | | Stadium: Stadio Città di Arezzo |

| 16 September 2023 3 | Carrarese | 1–0 | Vis Pesaro | Carrara |
| | | | | Stadium: Stadio dei Marmi |

| 20 September 2023 4 | Torres | 2–0 | Carrarese | Sassari |

| 24 September 2023 5 | Olbia | 0–0 | Carrarese | Olbia |

| 30 September 2023 6 | Carrarese | 2–0 | Virtus Entella | Carrara |
| | | | | Stadium: Stadio dei Marmi |

| 9 October 2023 7 | Gubbio | 2–0 | Carrarese | Gubbio |
| | | | | Stadium: Stadio Pietro Barbetti |

| 15 October 2023 8 | Carrarese | 1–0 | Ancona | Carrara |
| | | | | Stadium: Stadio dei Marmi |

| 23 October 2023 9 | Sestri Levante | 1–0 | Carrarese | Sestri Levante |

| 26 October 2023 10 | Carrarese | 1–1 | Pineto | Carrara |
| | | | | Stadium: Stadio dei Marmi |

| 30 October 2023 11 | Cesena | 2–1 | Carrarese | Cesena |

| 5 November 2023 12 | Carrarese | 1–0 | Pescara | Carrara |
| | | | | Stadium: Stadio dei Marmi |

| 12 November 2023 13 | Juventus Next Gen | 0–1 | Carrarese | Alessandria |

| 19 November 2023 14 | Carrarese | 1–0 | SPAL | Carrara |
| | | | | Stadium: Stadio dei Marmi |

| 25 November 2023 15 | Perugia | 1–1 | Carrarese | Perugia |

| 2 December 2023 16 | Carrarese | 1–1 | Recanatese | Carrara |
| | | | | Stadium: Stadio dei Marmi |

| 10 December 2023 17 | Rimini | 1–0 | Carrarese | Rimini |
| | | | | Stadium: Stadio Romeo Neri |

| 17 December 2023 18 | Carrarese | 1–0 | Lucchese | Carrara |
| | | | | Stadium: Stadio dei Marmi |

| 22 December 2023 19 | Pontedera | 1–2 | Carrarese | Pontedera |

| 6 January 2024 20 | Fermana | 0–0 | Carrarese | Fermo |
| | | | | Stadium: Stadio Bruno Recchioni |

| 14 January 2024 21 | Carrarese | 2–3 | Arezzo | Carrara |
| | | | | Stadium: Stadio dei Marmi |

| 21 January 2024 22 | Vis Pesaro | 0–0 | Carrarese | Pesaro |

| 28 January 2024 23 | Carrarese | 5–1 | Torres | Carrara |
| | | | | Stadium: Stadio dei Marmi |

| 4 February 2024 24 | Carrarese | 1–0 | Olbia | Carrara |
| | | | | Stadium: Stadio dei Marmi |

| 10 February 2024 25 | Virtus Entella | 1–3 | Carrarese | Chiavari |

| 14 February 2024 26 | Carrarese | 2–0 | Gubbio | Carrara |
| | | | | Stadium: Stadio dei Marmi |

| 18 February 2024 27 | Ancona | 2–2 | Carrarese | Ancona |

| 25 February 2024 28 | Carrarese | 5–1 | Sestri Levante | Carrara |
| | | | | Stadium: Stadio dei Marmi |

| 1 March 2024 29 | Pineto | 0–0 | Carrarese | Pineto |

| 5 March 2024 30 | Carrarese | 3–2 | Cesena | Carrara |
| | | | | Stadium: Stadio dei Marmi |

| 10 March 2024 31 | Pescara | 2–2 | Carrarese | Pescara |

| 16 March 2024 32 | Carrarese | 1–0 | Juventus Next Gen | Carrara |
| | | | | Stadium: Stadio dei Marmi |

| 23 March 2024 33 | SPAL | 0–0 | Carrarese | Ferrara |

| 28 March 2024 34 | Carrarese | 1–0 | Perugia | Carrara |
| | | | | Stadium: Stadio dei Marmi |

| 7 April 2024 35 | Recanatese | 4–1 | Carrarese | Recanati |

| 14 April 2024 36 | Carrarese | 3–0 | Rimini | Carrara |
| | | | | Stadium: Stadio dei Marmi |

| 21 April 2024 37 | Lucchese | 0–1 | Carrarese | Lucca |

| 28 April 2024 38 | Carrarese | 2–1 | Pontedera | Carrara |
| | | | | Stadium: Stadio dei Marmi |

==== National phase second round ====
| 14 May 2024 First leg | Perugia | 0–2 | Carrarese | Perugia |
| 20:30 | | | Zanon 3'; Di Gennaro 50' | Referee: Andrea Calzavara |

| 18 May 2024 Second leg | Carrarese | 1–2 (3–2 agg.) | Perugia | Carrara |
| 20:30 | Panico 31' | | Lisi 24'; Sylla 90+3' | Stadium: Stadio dei Marmi; Referee: Andrea Ancora |

==== National phase second round ====
| 21 May 2024 First leg | Juventus Next Gen | 1–1 | Carrarese | Alessandria |
| 20:30 | Savona 19' | | Capezzi 71' | Stadium: Stadio Giuseppe Moccagatta; Referee: Andrea Calzavara |

| 25 May 2024 Second leg | Carrarese | 2–2 (3–3 agg.) | Juventus Next Gen | Carrara |
| 20:30 | Palmieri 2'; Giannetti 56' | | Sekulov 21'; Cerri 66' | Stadium: Stadio dei Marmi; Referee: Alberto Ruben Arena |

Carrarese advanced as a seeded team.

==== Semi-finals ====
| 28 May 2024 First leg | Carrarese | 1–0 | Benevento | Carrara |
| 21:00 | Finotto 62' | | | Stadium: Stadio dei Marmi; Referee: Luca De Angeli |

| 2 June 2024 Second leg | Benevento | 2–2 (2–3 agg.) | Carrarese | Benevento |
| 21:00 | Lanini 17'; Talia (yellow card) 25' (yellow-red card) 43', (goal) 35' | | Finotto 19'; Schiavi 66' | Stadium: Stadio Ciro Vigorito; Referee: Roberto Lovison |

==== Final ====
| 5 June 2024 First leg | Vicenza | 0–0 | Carrarese | Vicenza |
| 21:00 | | | | Stadium: Stadio Romeo Menti; Referee: Alberto Ruben Arena |

| 9 June 2024 Second leg | Carrarese | 1–0 (1–0 agg.) | Vicenza | Carrara |
| 17:30 | Finotto 6' | | | Stadium: Stadio dei Marmi; Referee: Mario Perri |

=== Coppa Italia Serie C ===
| 4 October 2023 First round | Carrarese | 0–1 | Pontedera | Carrara |
| 16:15 | Capello (penalty missed) 82' | Report | Benedetti 76' | Stadium: Stadio dei Marmi; Referee: Francesco D'Eusanio |

== Statistics ==
=== Goalscorers ===
| Position | Players | Serie C | Play-offs | Coppa Italia Serie C | Total |
|---|---|---|---|---|---|
| FW | (Italy) Giuseppe Panico | 10 | 1 | 0 | 11 |
| FW | (Italy) Mattia Finotto | 7 | 3 | 0 | 10 |
| FW | (Italy) Alessandro Capello | 8 | 0 | 0 | 8 |
| MF | (Argentina) Nicolás Schiavi | 5 | 1 | 0 | 6 |
| MF | (Italy) Riccardo Palmieri | 4 | 1 | 0 | 5 |
