= 2023–24 Cagliari Calcio season =

Cagliari Calcio
2023–24 season
- President: Tommaso Giulini
- Head coach: Claudio Ranieri
- Stadium: Unipol Domus
- Serie A: 16th
- Coppa Italia: Round of 16
- Top goalscorer: League: Nicolas Viola (5); All: Nicolas Viola (6)
- Average home league attendance: 16,167
Home colours	Away colours	Third colours

The 2023–24 season was Cagliari Calcio's 124th season in existence and first season back in the Serie A. They also competed in the Coppa Italia.

== Players ==
=== First-team squad ===
As of 12 February 2024

Note: Flags indicate national team as defined under FIFA eligibility rules; some limited exceptions apply. Players may hold more than one non-FIFA nationality.

No.	Pos.	Nation	Player
1	GK	SRB	Boris Radunović
4	DF	ITA	Alberto Dossena
5	MF	ITA	Marco Mancosu (3rd captain)
8	MF	URU	Nahitan Nández (vice-captain)
9	FW	PER	Gianluca Lapadula
10	MF	ITA	Nicolas Viola (4th captain)
14	MF	ITA	Alessandro Deiola
16	MF	ITA	Matteo Prati
17	DF	GRE	Pantelis Chatzidiakos
18	GK	ITA	Simone Aresti
19	MF	ITA	Gaetano Oristanio (on loan from Internazionale)
21	MF	CZE	Jakub Jankto
22	GK	ITA	Simone Scuffet
23	DF	POL	Mateusz Wieteska

No.	Pos.	Nation	Player
25	MF	GHA	Ibrahim Sulemana
26	DF	COL	Yerry Mina
27	DF	ITA	Tommaso Augello
28	DF	ITA	Gabriele Zappa
29	MF	CGO	Antoine Makoumbou
30	FW	ITA	Leonardo Pavoletti (captain)
32	FW	ITA	Andrea Petagna (on loan from Monza)
33	DF	SVK	Adam Obert
37	DF	BRA	Paulo Azzi
61	FW	UZB	Eldor Shomurodov (on loan from Roma)
70	MF	ITA	Gianluca Gaetano (on loan from Napoli)
77	FW	ANG	Zito Luvumbo
99	DF	ITA	Alessandro Di Pardo

=== Out on loan ===
Note: Flags indicate national team as defined under FIFA eligibility rules; some limited exceptions apply. Players may hold more than one non-FIFA nationality.

No.	Pos.	Nation	Player
—	GK	ITA	Giuseppe Ciocci (at Pescara until 30 June 2024)
—	DF	ITA	Giorgio Altare (at Venezia until 30 June 2024)
—	DF	ITA	Salvatore Boccia (at Novara until 30 June 2024)
—	DF	ITA	Luigi Palomba (at Olbia until 30 June 2024)
—	DF	ITA	Christian Travaglini (at Ternana until 30 June 2024)
—	DF	ITA	Davide Veroli (at Catanzaro until 30 June 2024)
—	DF	ITA	Francesco Zallu (at Olbia until 30 June 2024)

No.	Pos.	Nation	Player
—	MF	ITA	Nicolò Cavuoti (at Olbia until 30 June 2024)
—	MF	GRE	Christos Kourfalidis (at Feralpisalò until 30 June 2024)
—	MF	ROU	Razvan Marin (at Empoli until 30 June 2024)
—	FW	ITA	Gianluca Contini (at Olbia until 30 June 2024)
—	MF	ARG	Isaías Delpupo (at Pontedera until 30 June 2024)
—	FW	SLO	Nik Prelec (at WSG Tirol until 30 June 2024)

== Transfers ==
=== In ===
Pos.	Player	Transferred from	Fee	Date	Source
MF	(Ghana) Ibrahim Sulemana	(Italy) Hellas Verona	€4,000,000	14 July 2023	
GK	(Italy) Simone Scuffet	(Romania) CFR Cluj	€800,000	14 July 2023	
MF	(Czech Republic) Jakub Jankto	(Spain) Getafe	Undisclosed	15 July 2023	
MF	(Italy) Gaetano Oristanio	(Italy) Internazionale	Loan	20 July 2023	
FW	(Uzbekistan) Eldor Shomurodov	(Italy) Roma	Loan	27 July 2023	
MF	(Italy) Matteo Prati	(Italy) SPAL	€5,000,000	17 August 2023	
DF	(Poland) Mateusz Wieteska	(France) Clermont	€5,000,000	29 August 2023	
FW	(Italy) Andrea Petagna	(Italy) Monza	Loan	30 August 2023	
DF	(Greece) Pantelis Chatzidiakos	(Netherlands) AZ	€2,000,000	1 September 2023	
MF	(Italy) Gianluca Gaetano	(Italy) Napoli	Loan	1 February 2024	
DF	(Colombia) Yerry Mina	(Italy) Fiorentina	Undisclosed	1 February 2024	

=== Out ===
Pos.	Player	Transferred to	Fee	Date	Source
MF	(Argentina) Isaías Delpupo	(Italy) Pontedera	Loan	31 July 2023	
DF	(Italy) Salvatore Boccia	(Italy) Novara	Loan	11 August 2023	
DF	(Italy) Christian Travaglini	(Italy) Ternana	Loan	13 August 2023	
MF	(Italy) Nunzio Lella	(Italy) Venezia	Undisclosed	24 August 2023	
DF	(Italy) Giorgio Altare	(Italy) Venezia	Loan	24 August 2023	
FW	(Uruguay) Gastón Pereiro	(Italy) Ternana	Loan	18 January 2024	
DF	(Italy) Elio Capradossi	(Italy) Lecco	Free	1 February 2024	
FW	(Italy) Gianluca Contini	(Italy) Virtus Francavilla	Loan	1 February 2024	
MF	(Croatia) Marko Rog	(Croatia) Dinamo Zagreb	Loan	12 February 2024	

== Pre-season and friendlies ==
Win Draw Loss

29 July 2023 Friendly	Cagliari (Italy)	3–0	(Italy) Juventus Next Gen	Châtillon
19:00 UTC+2	Luvumbo 71', 82', 90'	Report		Stadium: Campo Sportivo E. Brunod; Referee: Matteo Gualtieri

2 August 2023 Friendly	Cagliari (Italy)	2–1	(Italy) Como	Châtillon
17:00 UTC+2	Lella 32'; Viola 90+1' (pen.)	Report	Blanco 65'	Stadium: Campo Sportivo E. Brunod; Referee: Ghersini

5 August 2023 Friendly	Brest (France)	1–1	(Italy) Cagliari	Brest, France
18:00 UTC+2	Satriano 57'	Report	Pavoletti 70'	Stadium: Stade Francis-Le Blé; Referee: François Letexier (France)

== Competitions ==
=== Overall record ===
Competition	First match	Last match	Starting round	Final position	Record							
Competition	First match	Last match	Starting round	Final position	Pld	W	D	L	GF	GA	GD	Win %
Serie A	21 August 2023	23 May 2024	Matchday 1	16th	38	8	12	18	42	68	−26	21.05
Coppa Italia	12 August 2023	2 January 2024	Round of 64	Round of 16	3	2	0	1	5	6	−1	66.67
Total					41	10	12	19	47	74	−27	24.39

Source: Soccerway

=== Serie A ===
==== League table ====
Pos	Team	Pld	W	D	L	GF	GA	GD	Pts	Qualification or relegation
14	Lecce	38	8	14	16	32	54	−22	38 (Note: Hellas Verona finished ahead of Lecce on head-to-head points: Hellas Verona 2–2 Lecce, Lecce 0–1 Hellas Verona.)	
15	Udinese	38	6	19	13	37	53	−16	37	
16	Cagliari	38	8	12	18	42	68	−26	36 (Note: Cagliari finished ahead of Empoli on head-to-head points: Cagliari 0–0 Empoli, Empoli 0–1 Cagliari.)	
17	Empoli	38	9	9	20	29	54	−25	36	
18	Frosinone (R)	38	8	11	19	44	69	−25	35	Relegation to Serie B

Source: Serie A
Rules for classification: 1) Points; 2) Tiebreaker for Champions team and third relegated team; 3) Head-to-head points; 4) Head-to-head goal difference; 5) Goal difference; 6) Goals scored; 7) Draw.
(Note: Head-to-head record is used only after all the matches between the teams in question have been played)
(R) Relegated

==== Results summary ====
Overall								Home						Away					
Pld	W	D	L	GF	GA	GD	Pts	W	D	L	GF	GA	GD	W	D	L	GF	GA	GD
38	8	12	18	42	68	−26	36	6	7	6	28	32	−4	2	5	12	14	36	−22

Source: Serie A

==== Results by round ====
Round	1	2	3	4	5	6	7	8	9	10	11	12	13	14	15	16	17	18	19	20	21	22	23	24	25	26	27	28	29	30	31	32	33	34	35	36	37	38
Ground	A	H	A	H	A	H	A	H	A	H	H	A	H	A	H	A	A	H	A	H	A	H	A	H	A	H	A	H	A	H	H	A	H	A	H	A	A	H
Result	D	L	L	D	L	L	L	L	D	W	W	L	D	L	W	L	L	D	D	W	L	L	L	L	D	D	W	W	L	D	W	D	D	L	D	L	W	L
Position	11	15	19	18	19	20	20	20	20	19	17	18	17	19	16	16	18	18	17	17	17	18	18	19	19	19	18	15	16	16	13	14	14	14	15	16	15	16

Source: Serie A
A = Away; H = Home; W = Win; D = Draw; L = Loss

==== Matches ====
The league fixtures were unveiled on 5 July 2023.

21 August 2023 1	Torino	0–0	Cagliari	Turin
18:30 CEST (UTC+2)	Buongiorno (yellow card) 36'	Report	Pavoletti (yellow card) 90+5'	Stadium: Stadio Olimpico Grande Torino; Attendance: 20,296; Referee: Francesco Cosso

28 August 2023 2	Cagliari	0–2	Internazionale	Cagliari
20:45 CEST (UTC+2)	Luvumbo (yellow card) 83'	Report	Dumfries 21'; Martínez 30'; Mkhitaryan (yellow card) 81'	Stadium: Unipol Domus; Attendance: 16,412; Referee: Michael Fabbri

2 September 2023 3	Bologna	2–1	Cagliari	Bologna
18:30 CEST (UTC+2)	Ferguson (yellow card) 40'; Zirkzee 59'; Orsolini (penalty missed) 75'; Fabbian 89'	Report	Luvumbo 22'; Sulemana (yellow card) 70'; Makoumbou (yellow card) 90+2'	Stadium: Stadio Renato Dall'Ara; Attendance: 22,818; Referee: Daniele Orsato

17 September 2023 4	Cagliari	0–0	Udinese	Cagliari
12:30 CEST (UTC+2)	Wieteska (yellow card) 60' (yellow-red card) 90+5'	Report	Thauvin (yellow card) 63'	Stadium: Unipol Domus; Attendance: 15,121; Referee: Daniele Doveri

24 September 2023 5	Atalanta	2–0	Cagliari	Bergamo
15:00 CEST (UTC+2)	Lookman 33'; Djimsiti (yellow card) 54'; Pašalić 76'	Report	Deiola (yellow card) 32'; Luvumbo (yellow card) 42'	Stadium: Gewiss Stadium; Attendance: 14,739; Referee: Ermanno Feliciani

27 September 2023 6	Cagliari	1–3	Milan	Cagliari
18:30 CEST (UTC+2)	Luvumbo 29'; Wieteska (yellow card) 42'; Zappa (yellow card) 53'; Oristanio (yellow card) 78'	Report	Okafor 40'; Tomori 45'; Loftus-Cheek (yellow card) 48', (goal) 60'	Stadium: Unipol Domus; Attendance: 18,471; Referee: Federico La Penna

2 October 2023 7	Fiorentina	3–0	Cagliari	Florence
20:45 CEST (UTC+2)	González 3'; Dossena 21' (o.g.); Infantino (yellow card) 86'; Nzola 90+4'	Report	Pavoletti (yellow card) 90+2'	Stadium: Stadio Artemio Franchi; Attendance: 27,309; Referee: Marco Di Bello

8 October 2023 8	Cagliari	1–4	Roma	Cagliari
18:00 CEST (UTC+2)	Sulemana (yellow card) 17'; Obert (yellow card) 61'; Nández 87' (pen.)	Report	Paredes (yellow card) 11'; Aouar 19', (yellow card) 32'; Lukaku 20', 59'; Bove (yellow card) 45+2'; Belotti 51'	Stadium: Unipol Domus; Attendance: 16,307; Referee: Simone Sozza

22 October 2023 9	Salernitana	2–2	Cagliari	Salernitana
15:00 CEST (UTC+2)	Kastanos (yellow card) 52'; Martegani (yellow card) 79'; Dia 86', 90+5' (pen.); Gyömbér (yellow card) 90+11'	Report	Prati (yellow card) 71'; Luvumbo 79'; Zappa (yellow card) 80'; Viola 88'; Deiola (yellow card) 89'; Makoumbou (yellow card) 90+6'	Stadium: Stadio Arechi; Attendance: 17,049; Referee: Daniele Chiffi

29 October 2023 10	Cagliari	4–3	Frosinone	Cagliari
12:30 CET (UTC+1)	Mancosu (penalty missed) 30'; Prati (yellow card) 57'; Oristanio 72'; Makoumbou 76'; Pavoletti 90+4', 90+6'	Report	Soulé 23', 37'; Romagnoli (yellow card) 26'; Brescianini 49'; Bourabia (yellow card) 85'; Okoli (yellow card) 87'; Marchizza (yellow card) 90+5'	Stadium: Unipol Domus; Attendance: 15,936; Referee: Luca Pairetto

5 November 2023 11	Cagliari	2–1	Genoa	Cagliari
15:00 CET (UTC+1)	Viola 48', (yellow card) 90+3'; Zappa 69'; Goldaniga (yellow card) 72'; Petagna (yellow card) 90+1'; Scuffet (yellow card) 90+7'	Report	Malinovskyi (yellow card) 28'; Guðmundsson 51', (yellow card) 71'	Stadium: Unipol Domus; Attendance: 16,412; Referee: Marco Guida

11 November 2023 12	Juventus	2–1	Cagliari	Turin
18:00 CET (UTC+1)	McKennie (yellow card) 57'; Bremer 60'; Rugani 70'; Kostić (yellow card) 82'; Cambiaso (yellow card) 87'	Report	Luvumbo (yellow card) 70'; Dossena 75'	Stadium: Juventus Stadium; Attendance: 40,393; Referee: Marco Piccinini

26 November 2023 13	Cagliari	1–1	Monza	Cagliari
12:30 CET (UTC+1)	Dossena 10'; Prati (yellow card) 42'	Report	Birindelli (yellow card) 48'; Marić 61'; Machín (yellow card) 69'	Stadium: Unipol Domus; Attendance: 16,291; Referee: Matteo Marchetti

2 December 2023 14	Lazio	1–0	Cagliari	Rome
18:00 CET (UTC+1)	Pedro 8'	Report	Chatzidiakos (yellow card) 12'; Makoumbou (red card) 27'; Nández (yellow card) 75'	Stadium: Stadio Olimpico; Attendance: 40,000; Referee: Federico Dionisi

10 December 2023 15	Cagliari	2–1	Sassuolo	Cagliari
20:45 CET (UTC+1)	Goldaniga (yellow card) 55'; Lapadula 90+4'; Pavoletti 90+9'	Report	Erlić 7', (yellow card) 43'; Laurienté (yellow card) 9'; Ruan (yellow card) 35' (yellow-red card) 62'; Consigli (yellow card) 69'; Thorstvedt (yellow card) 90+3'; Mulattieri (yellow card) 90+5'	Stadium: Unipol Domus; Attendance: 15,769; Referee: Maurizio Mariani

16 December 2023 16	Napoli	2–1	Cagliari	Naples
18:30 CET (UTC+1)	Osimhen (yellow card) 45', (goal) 69'; Rrahmani (yellow card) 45+4'; Kvaratskhelia 75'; Mário Rui (yellow card) 85'; Politano (yellow card) 88'; Zambo Anguissa (yellow card) 90+1'	Report	Goldaniga (yellow card) 45+2'; Pavoletti (yellow card) 45+3', (goal) 72'; Augello (yellow card) 63'	Stadium: Stadio Diego Armando Maradona; Attendance: 45,000; Referee: Matteo Marcenaro
Note: The match was originally scheduled for 18:00, but was delayed by half an hour due to strong winds.

23 December 2023 17	Hellas Verona	2–0	Cagliari	Verona
18:00 CET (UTC+1)	Duda (yellow card) 45'; Ngonge 53', (yellow card) 69'; Suslov (yellow card) 57'; Đurić 90'	Report	Makoumbou (yellow card) 12' (yellow-red card) 51'; Viola (yellow card) 57'; Sulemana (yellow card) 90+3'	Stadium: Stadio Marcantonio Bentegodi; Attendance: 16,716; Referee: Daniele Orsato

30 December 2023 18	Cagliari	0–0	Empoli	Cagliari
15:00 CET (UTC+1)	Lapadula (yellow card) 29'; Viola (penalty missed) 82'	Report	Maleh (yellow card) 29'; Cacace (yellow card) 64'; Walukiewicz (yellow card) 80'	Stadium: Unipol Domus; Attendance: 16,125; Referee: Fabio Maresca

6 January 2024 19	Lecce	1–1	Cagliari	Lecce
18:00 CET (UTC+1)	Gendrey 31'; Strefezza (yellow card) 67'	Report	Dossena (yellow card) 36'; Oristanio 68'	Stadium: Stadio Via del mare Attendance: 25,203; Referee: Davide Massa

14 January 2024 20	Cagliari	2–1	Bologna	Cagliari
15:00 CET (UTC+1)	Petagna 31'; Nández (yellow card) 45+2'; Dossena (yellow card) 45+2'; Calafiori 69' (o.g.); Wieteska (yellow card) 90'	Report	Posch (yellow card) 3'; Orsolini 24'; Calafiori (yellow card) 88'	Stadium: Unipol Domus; Attendance: 15,980; Referee: Gianluca Manganiello

21 January 2024 21	Frosinone	3–1	Cagliari	Frosinone
12:30 CET (UTC+1)	Soulé (yellow card) 57', (goal) 75'; Mazzitelli 64'; Zortea (yellow card) 90+3'; Kaio 90+5', (yellow card) 90+7'	Report	Azzi (yellow card) 22'; Sulemana 26'; Petagna (yellow card) 62'; Dossena (yellow card) 74'; Lapadula (yellow card) 78'; Pavoletti (yellow card) 90+4'	Stadium: Stadio Benito Stirpe; Attendance: 13,925; Referee: Federico Dionisi

26 January 2024 22	Cagliari	1–2	Torino	Cagliari
20:45 CET (UTC+1)	Wieteska (yellow card) 41'; Viola (yellow card) 73', (goal) 77'	Report	Zapata 23'; Ricci 45+3', (yellow card) 62'; Milinković-Savić (yellow card) 82'; Buongiorno (yellow card) 83'; Rodriguez (yellow card) 90'	Stadium: Unipol Domus; Attendance: 16,196; Referee: Andrea Colombo

5 February 2024 23	Roma	4–0	Cagliari	Rome
20:45 CET (UTC+1)	Pellegrini 2'; Dybala 23', 51' (pen.); Huijsen 59'; Paredes (yellow card) 66'	Report	Nández (yellow card) 66'	Stadium: Stadio Olimpico; Attendance: 61,755; Referee: Matteo Marcenaro

10 February 2024 24	Cagliari	1–3	Lazio	Cagliari
15:00 CET (UTC+1)	Gaetano 51'; Makoumbou (yellow card) 52'	Report	Deiola 26' (o.g.); Immobile (yellow card) 45+2', (goal) 49'; Felipe Anderson 65'; Romagnoli (yellow card) 68'; Vecino (yellow card) 90+3'	Stadium: Unipol Domus; Attendance: 16,155; Referee: Marco Di Bello

18 February 2024 25	Udinese	1–1	Cagliari	Udine
15:00 CET (UTC+1)	Zemura 14'; Lucca (yellow card) 20'; Gianetti (yellow card) 54'; Ferreira (yellow card) 78'	Report	Dossena (yellow card) 33'; Augello (yellow card) 39'; Gaetano 44'	Stadium: Stadio Friuli; Attendance: 15,445; Referee: Maurizio Mariani

25 February 2024 26	Cagliari	1–1	Napoli	Cagliari
15:00 CET (UTC+1)	Lapadula (yellow card) 36'; Luvumbo (yellow card) 48', (goal) 90+6'; Nández (yellow card) 68'; Deiola (yellow card) 86'	Report	Osimhen 66'; Olivera (yellow card) 90+1'	Stadium: Unipol Domus; Attendance: 16,382; Referee: Luca Pairetto

3 March 2024 27	Empoli	0–1	Cagliari	Empoli
15:00 CET (UTC+1)		Report	Gaetano (yellow card) 17'; Jankto 69'; Mina (yellow card) 79'	Stadium: Stadio Carlo Castellani; Attendance: 11,223; Referee: Antonio Rapuano

9 March 2024 28	Cagliari	4–2	Salernitana	Cagliari
15:00 CET (UTC+1)	Lapadula 12'; Gaetano 40'; Shomurodov 51', 76'; Augello (yellow card) 70'	Report	Kastanos 56', (yellow card) 73'; Maggiore 58'; Sambia (yellow card) 85'	Stadium: Unipol Domus; Attendance: 16,118; Referee: Francesco Fourneau

16 March 2024 29	Monza	1–0	Cagliari	Monza
15:00 CET (UTC+1)	Izzo (yellow card) 30'; Maldini 41'; Bondo (yellow card) 65'	Report	Deiola (yellow card) 59'	Stadium: Stadio Brianteo; Attendance: 14,145; Referee: Matteo Marcenaro

1 April 2024 30	Cagliari	1–1	Hellas Verona	Cagliari
15:00 CEST (UTC+2)	Sulemana 74'	Report	Duda (yellow card) 27'; Bonazzoli 30'; Magnani (yellow card) 90+3'	Stadium: Unipol Domus; Attendance: 16,285; Referee: Daniele Doveri

7 April 2024 31	Cagliari	2–1	Atalanta	Cagliari
18:00 CEST (UTC+2)	Augello 42'; Deiola (yellow card) 66'; Luvumbo (yellow card) 75'; Nández (yellow card) 75'; Viola 88'	Report	Scamacca 13'; De Roon (yellow card) 54'; Zappacosta (yellow card) 63'; Tolói (yellow card) 74'	Stadium: Unipol Domus; Attendance: 16,342; Referee: Antonio Rapuano

14 April 2024 32	Internazionale	2–2	Cagliari	Milan
20:45 CEST (UTC+2)	Thuram 12'; Çalhanoğlu 74' (pen.)	Report	Prati (yellow card) 40'; Shomurodov 64'; Mina (yellow card) 73'; Viola 82'	Stadium: San Siro; Attendance: 72,559; Referee: Francesco Fourneau

19 April 2024 33	Cagliari	2–2	Juventus	Cagliari
20:45 CEST (UTC+2)	Gaetano 30' (pen.); Mina 36' (pen.); Luvumbo (yellow card) 45+2'; Nández (yellow card) 60'	Report	Szczęsny (yellow card) 35'; Weah (yellow card) 45+2'; Bremer (yellow card) 48'; Vlahović 61'; Dossena 87' (o.g.)	Stadium: Unipol Domus; Attendance: 16,179; Referee: Marco Piccinini

29 April 2024 34	Genoa	3–0	Cagliari	Genoa
20:45 CEST (UTC+2)	Thorsby 17'; Frendrup 27'; Guðmundsson 63'	Report	Shomurodov (yellow card) 58'; Augello (yellow card) 72'	Stadium: Stadio Luigi Ferraris; Attendance: 17,257; Referee: Federico Dionisi

5 May 2024 35	Cagliari	1–1	Lecce	Cagliari
12:30 CEST (UTC+2)	Mina 26'; Gaetano (red card) 42'; Scuffet (yellow card) 64'; Nández (yellow card) 74'; Augello (yellow card) 78'; Deiola (yellow card) 78'	Report	Piccoli (yellow card) 14'; Sansone (yellow card) 54'; Ramadani (yellow card) 56'; Baschirotto (yellow card) 74'; Krstović 84'	Stadium: Unipol Domus; Attendance: 16,407; Referee: Matteo Marcenaro

11 May 2024 36	Milan	5–1	Cagliari	Milan
20:45 CEST (UTC+2)	Bennacer (yellow card) 28', (goal) 35'; Gabbia (yellow card) 33'; Pulisic 59', 86'; Reijnders 74'; Leão 83'	Report	Nández 63'; Mina (yellow card) 69'	Stadium: San Siro; Attendance: 70,612; Referee: Simone Sozza

19 May 2024 37	Sassuolo	0–2	Cagliari	Sassuolo
12:30 CEST (UTC+2)	Thorstvedt (yellow card) 54'; Pinamonti (yellow card) 79'; Matheus Henrique (yellow card) 90+3' (yellow-red card) 90+3'	Report	Deiola (yellow card) 61'; Prati 71'; Dossena (yellow card) 76'; Lapadula 90+1' (pen.)	Stadium: Mapei Stadium – Città del Tricolore; Attendance: 15,548; Referee: Daniele Doveri

23 May 2024 38	Cagliari	2–3	Fiorentina	Cagliari
20:45 CEST (UTC+2)	Deiola 64'; Mutandwa 85'; Mina (yellow card) 90+2'; Sulemana (yellow card) 90+4'	Report	Bonaventura 39', (yellow card) 71'; Mandragora (yellow card) 44'; Biraghi (yellow card) 45+4'; González 89'; Nzola (yellow card) 90'; Arthur 90+13' (pen.)	Stadium: Unipol Domus; Attendance: 16,412; Referee: Alessandro Prontera

=== Coppa Italia ===
12 August 2023 Round of 64	Cagliari	2–1 (a.e.t.)	Palermo	Cagliari
21:15 CEST (UTC+2)	Pavoletti (penalty missed) 23'; Oristanio (yellow card) 32'; Dossena (yellow card) 89', (goal) 100'; Di Pardo 120+3'	Report	Gomes (yellow card) 11'; Vasic (yellow card) 73'; Soleri 120+1'	Stadium: Unipol Domus; Attendance: 14,917; Referee: Livio Marinelli

1 November 2023 Round of 32	Udinese	1–2 (a.e.t.)	Cagliari	Udine
21:00 CET (UTC+1)	Guessand 63', (yellow card) 79'; Quina (yellow card) 90+5'; Ferreira (yellow card) 108'	Report	Pereiro (yellow card) 76'; Viola 80'; Wieteska (yellow card) 90+2'; Lapadula 120'	Stadium: Stadio Friuli; Attendance: 4,537; Referee: Francesco Cosso

2 January 2024 Round of 16	Milan	4–1	Cagliari	Milan
21:00 CET (UTC+1)	Jović 29', 42'; Traorè 50'; Leão 90+1'	Report	Di Pardo (yellow card) 59'; Deiola (yellow card) 70'; Azzi 87', (yellow card) 88'	Stadium: San Siro; Attendance: 57,169; Referee: Alessandro Prontera

== Statistics ==
=== Goalscorers ===
Position	Players	Serie A	Coppa Italia	Total
MF	(Italy) Nicolas Viola	5	1	6
MF	(Italy) Gianluca Gaetano	4	0	4
FW	(Peru) Gianluca Lapadula	3	1	4
FW	(Italy) Leonardo Pavoletti	4	0	4
DF	(Italy) Alberto Dossena	2	1	3
FW	(Uzbekistan) Eldor Shomurodov	3	0	3
DF	(Colombia) Yerry Mina	2	0	2
MF	(Uruguay) Nahitan Nández	2	0	2
MF	(Italy) Gaetano Oristanio	2	0	2
MF	(Ghana) Ibrahim Sulemana	2	0	2
DF	(Italy) Tommaso Augello	1	0	1
DF	(Brazil) Paulo Azzi	0	1	1
MF	(Italy) Alessandro Deiola	1	0	1
DF	(Italy) Alessandro Di Pardo	0	1	1
MF	(Czech Republic) Jakub Jankto	1	0	1
MF	(Republic of the Congo) Antoine Makoumbou	1	0	1
FW	(Zambia) Kingstone Mutandwa	1	0	1
FW	(Italy) Andrea Petagna	1	0	1
MF	(Italy) Matteo Prati	1	0	1
DF	(Italy) Gabriele Zappa	1	0	1
