= Alessandro Di Pardo =

Italian footballer (born 1999)

Personal information
- Date of birth: 18 July 1999 (age 27)
- Place of birth: Rimini, Italy
- Height: 1.82 m (6 ft 0 in)
- Positions: Right-back; midfielder

Team information
- Current team: Sampdoria
- Number: 29

Youth career
- –2016: Rimini
- 2016–2018: SPAL
- 2017–2018: → Juventus (loan)
- 2018: Juventus

Senior career*
Years	Team	Apps	(Gls)
2018–2023	Juventus	4	(0)
2018–2021	→ Juventus U23 (res.)	62	(1)
2021–2022	→ Vicenza (loan)	15	(1)
2022	→ Cosenza (loan)	14	(0)
2022–2023	→ Cagliari (loan)	16	(0)
2023–2026	Cagliari	18	(0)
2024–2025	→ Modena (loan)	26	(2)
2026–	Sampdoria	16	(1)

International career
2017	Italy U18	3	(0)
2017–2018	Italy U19	2	(0)
- * Club domestic league appearances and goals as of 13 May 2026

Alessandro Di Pardo (born 18 July 1999) is an Italian professional footballer who plays as a right-back or midfielder for Serie B club Sampdoria.

== Early life ==
Di Pardo was born in Rimini, Italy, to a father from Campobasso, Italy.

== Club career ==
=== Juventus U23 ===
Di Pardo made his Serie C debut for Juventus U23 on 16 September 2018, in a game against Alessandria. Di Pardo's first goal came on 28 September 2020, in a 2–1 win against Pro Sesto.

=== Juventus ===
On 27 January 2021, he made his debut for Juventus, coming on as a substitute in a 4–0 Coppa Italia win over SPAL. Di Pardo's Serie A debut came on 22 February, as a substitute against Crotone in a 3–0 win.

==== Loans to Vicenza and Cosenza ====
On 27 July 2021, Di Pardo moved to Vicenza on loan. On 29 January 2022, he moved on a new loan to Cosenza.

=== Cagliari ===
On 30 June 2022, Di Pardo joined Cagliari on loan with an option to buy and an obligation to buy conditional on Cagliari's promotion to Serie A. Cagliari was promoted and the transfer became permanent.

==== Loan to Modena ====
On 22 August 2024, Di Pardo moved to Modena in Serie B on loan with an option to buy and a conditional obligation to buy.

=== Sampdoria ===
On 29 January 2026, Di Pardo signed a three-and-a-half-year contract with Sampdoria.

== Career statistics ==
=== Club ===
Appearances and goals by club, season and competition
Club	Season	League			Coppa Italia		Continental		Other		Total	
Club	Season	Division	Apps	Goals	Apps	Goals	Apps	Goals	Apps	Goals	Apps	Goals
Juventus U23	2018–19	Serie C	25	1	—		—		—		25	1
Juventus U23	2019–20	Serie C	19	0	—		—		5 (Note: Four appearances in Coppa Italia Serie C; One appearance in Serie C Promotion play-offs)	0	24	0
Juventus U23	2020–21	Serie C	18	1	—		—		2 (Note: Appearance(s) in Serie C Promotion play-offs)	0	20	1
Juventus U23	Total		62	2	—		—		7	0	69	2
Juventus	2020–21	Serie A	4	0	1	0	0	0	0	0	5	0
Juventus	2021–22	Serie A	0	0	0	0	0	0	0	0	0	0
Juventus	2022–23	Serie A	0	0	0	0	0	0	—		0	0
Juventus	Total		4	0	1	0	0	0	0	0	5	0
Vicenza (loan)	2021–22	Serie B	15	1	1	0	—		—		16	1
Cosenza (loan)	2021–22	Serie B	14	0	—		—		0	0	14	0
Cagliari (loan)	2022–23	Serie B	16	0	1	0	—		4 (Note: Appearance(s) in Serie B Promotion play-offs)	0	21	0
Cagliari	2023–24	Serie A	15	0	3	1	—		—		18	1
Cagliari	2024–25	Serie A	0	0	0	0	—		—		0	0
Cagliari	2025–26	Serie A	3	0	2	0	—		—		5	0
Cagliari	Total		18	0	5	1	—		—		23	1
Modena (loan)	2024–25	Serie B	26	2	0	0	—		—		26	2
Sampdoria	2025–26	Serie B	11	1	—		—		—		11	1
Career total			166	6	8	1	0	0	11	0	185	7

== Honours ==
Juventus U23

- Coppa Italia Serie C: 2019–20

Juventus

- Coppa Italia: 2020–21
- Supercoppa Italiana: 2020
