= Manuel Cicconi =

Italian footballer

Personal information
- Date of birth: 27 June 1997 (age 29)
- Place of birth: Como, Italy
- Height: 1.82 m (6 ft 0 in)
- Position: Midfielder

Team information
- Current team: Sampdoria
- Number: 7

Youth career
- –2016: Como

Senior career*
Years	Team	Apps	(Gls)
2016–2019	Como	64	(14)
2019–2022	Virtus Entella	15	(0)
2020–2021	→ Como (loan)	37	(3)
2022	→ Renate (loan)	15	(4)
2022–	Carrarese	124	(10)
2026–	→ Sampdoria (loan)	16	(0)
- * Club domestic league appearances and goals as of 13 May 2026

Manuel Cicconi (born 27 June 1997) is an Italian professional footballer who plays as a midfielder for Serie B club Sampdoria, on loan from Carrarese.

== Club career ==
Born and raised in Como, Cicconi started his career on his local club Como 1907, and made his debut for the club in the 2015–16 season. After 5 seasons on Como, Cicconi signed for Virtus Entella. He was loaned back to Como at the end of the 2019–20 Serie C.

On 26 January 2022, he joined Renate on loan.

On 1 September 2022, Cicconi signed a one-year contract with Carrarese.

On 30 January 2026, Cicconi moved to Sampdoria on loan with an obligation to buy and signed a contract with Sampdoria until 30 June 2029.

== Career statistics ==
=== Club ===
As of 5 May 2026

Appearances and goals by club, season and competition
Club	Season	League			National cup (Note: Includes Copa Italia, Copa Serie C, Copa Serie D)		Other		Total	
Club	Season	Division	Apps	Goals	Apps	Goals	Apps	Goals	Apps	Goals
Como	2015–16	Serie B	1	0	1	0	—		2	0
Como	2016–17	Serie C	3	1	0	0	—		3	1
Como	2017–18	Serie D	29	6	2	1	2 (Note: Appearance(s) in Serie D playoffs)	0	33	7
Como	2018–19	Serie D	31	7	1	0	2	0	34	7
Como	2019–20	Serie C	4	0	—		—		4	0
Como	Total		67	14	4	1	4	0	75	15
Virtus Entella	2019–20	Serie B	2	0	1	0	—		3	0
Virtus Entella	2021–22	Serie C	13	0	3	0	—		16	0
Virtus Entella	Total		15	0	4	0	0	0	19	0
Como (loan)	2020–21	Serie C	33	3	0	0	1 (Note: Appearance(s) in Supercoppa di Serie C)	0	34	3
Renate (loan)	2021–22	Serie C	15	4	0	0	2 (Note: Appearance(s) in Serie C playoffs)	0	17	4
Carrarese	2022–23	Serie C	35	4	1	0	1	0	37	4
Carrarese	2023–24	Serie C	34	2	0	0	8	0	42	2
Carrarese	2024–25	Serie B	34	3	2	0	—		42	2
Carrarese	2025–26	Serie B	21	1	0	0	—		21	1
Carrarese	Total		124	10	3	0	9	0	136	10
Sampdoria (loan)	2025–26	Serie B	15	0	0	0	—		15	0
Career total			169	31	11	1	16	0	196	32
