= Matteo Palma =

German footballer (born 2008)

Personal information
- Date of birth: 13 March 2008 (age 18)
- Place of birth: Berlin, Germany
- Height: 1.94 m (6 ft 4 in)
- Position: Centre-back

Team information
- Current team: Udinese
- Number: 16

Youth career
- –2022: Hertha BSC
- 2022–2025: Udinese

Senior career*
Years	Team	Apps	(Gls)
2024–	Udinese	12	(1)
2026	→ Sampdoria (loan)	11	(1)

International career^{‡}
2022–2023	Italy U15	3	(0)
2023–2024	Germany U16	7	(0)
2024	Germany U17	6	(0)
- * Club domestic league appearances and goals as of 15:19, 7 November 2026 (UTC) ‡ National team caps and goals as of 15 October 2024

Matteo Palma (born 13 March 2008) is a professional footballer who plays as a centre-back for Serie A club Udinese. Born in Germany, he has represented both Italy and Germany internationally at youth level.

== Life and career ==
Palma was born on 13 March 2008 in Berlin, Germany. He was born to an Italian father and a German mother of Cameroonian descent. As a youth player, he joined the academy of German side Hertha BSC. In 2022, Palma joined the youth academy of Serie A club Udinese. He started his senior career with the club on 25 September 2024, as he made his debut for them during a 3–1 win over Salernitana.

On 14 January 2026, Palma was loaned by Sampdoria in Serie B.

== International career ==
He currently is a Germany youth international, although he represented Italy at youth international before. Palma played for the Italy U15s, Germany U16s, and Germany U17s. He made three appearances while playing for the Italy U15s.

On 7 November 2026, Palma replaced Gianluca Mancini as one of the players who were called up with the Italy national team by head coach Roberto Mancini for the 2026–27 UEFA Nations League matches against France and Belgium on 12 and 15 November 2026, respectively.

== Style of play ==
Palma mainly operates as a defender. He specifically operates as a central defender, he can also operate as a full-back and is right-footed. He is known for his strength, and has received comparisons to Italy international Giorgio Scalvini. Palma has been described as "gifted with a fair amount of ease in running and speed".

== Career statistics ==
=== Club ===
As of match played 6 November 2026

Appearances and goals by club, season and competition
Club	Season	League			National cup		Europe		Total	
Club	Season	Division	Apps	Goals	Apps	Goals	Apps	Goals	Apps	Goals
Udinese	2024–25	Serie A	1	0	1	0	—		2	0
Udinese	2025–26	Serie A	5	0	3	0	—		8	0
Udinese	2026–27	Serie A	6	1	1	0	—		7	1
Udinese	Total		12	1	5	0	0	0	17	1
Sampdoria (loan)	2025–26	Serie B	11	1	0	0	—		11	1
Career total			23	2	5	0	0	0	28	2
