= Alberto Dossena =

Italian footballer (born 1998)

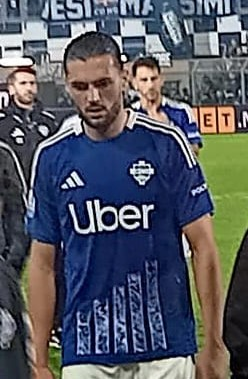
- Dossena with Como in 2024

Personal information
- Date of birth: 13 October 1998 (age 28)
- Place of birth: Brescia, Italy
- Height: 1.88 m (6 ft 2 in)
- Position: Centre-back

Team information
- Current team: Como
- Number: 13

Youth career
- –2015: Lumezzane
- 2015–2016: → Atalanta (loan)
- 2016: Atalanta

Senior career*
Years	Team	Apps	(Gls)
2017–2020	Atalanta	0	(0)
2017–2018	→ Perugia (loan)	10	(1)
2018	→ Siena (loan)	6	(0)
2018–2019	→ Pistoiese (loan)	28	(0)
2019–2020	→ Alessandria (loan)	26	(0)
2020–2022	Avellino	47	(3)
2022–2024	Cagliari	58	(2)
2024–	Como	23	(0)
2026	→ Cagliari (loan)	12	(0)
- * Club domestic league appearances and goals as of 25 May 2026

Alberto Dossena (born 13 October 1998) is an Italian professional footballer who plays as a centre-back for Serie A club Como.

== Career ==
Dossena made his professional debut in Serie B for Perugia on 4 March 2017 in a game against Avellino. On 2 August 2019, he joined Alessandria on loan.

On 15 September 2020, Dossena joined Avellino, with Atalanta retaining a buy-back option. On 12 August 2022, he signed a four-year contract with Cagliari.

On 29 June 2024, Dossena signed a four-year deal with newly promoted Serie A club Como. On 21 January 2026, he returned to Cagliari on loan until the end of the 2025–26 season.

== Career statistics ==
As of match played 1 July 2026

Appearances and goals by club, season and competition
Club	Season	League			National cup		Other (Note: Includes Coppa Italia Serie C, Serie C play-off, Serie B play-off)		Total	
Club	Season	Division	Apps	Goals	Apps	Goals	Apps	Goals	Apps	Goals
Atalanta	2017–18	Serie A	0	0	0	0	0	0	0	0
Atalanta	2018–19	Serie A	0	0	0	0	0	0	0	0
Atalanta	2019–20	Serie A	0	0	0	0	0	0	0	0
Atalanta	2020–21	Serie A	0	0	0	0	0	0	0	0
Atalanta	Total		0	0	0	0	0	0	0	0
Perugia (loan)	2016–17	Serie B	5	0	0	0	—		5	0
Perugia (loan)	2017–18	Serie B	5	1	1	0	—		6	1
Perugia (loan)	Total		10	1	1	0	—		11	1
Siena (loan)	2017–18	Serie C	6	0	—		—		6	0
Pistoiese (loan)	2018–19	Serie C	28	0	1	0	1	0	30	0
Alessandria (loan)	2019–20	Serie C	26	0	0	0	2	0	28	0
Avellino	2020–21	Serie C	20	2	1	0	6 (Note: Appearances in Serie C play-off)	0	27	2
Avellino	2021–22	Serie C	27	1	1	0	3	0	31	1
Avellino	Total		47	3	2	0	9	0	58	3
Cagliari	2022–23	Serie B	23	0	1	0	4 (Note: Appearances in Serie B play-off)	0	28	0
Cagliari	2023–24	Serie A	35	2	1	1	—		36	3
Cagliari	Total		58	2	2	1	4	0	64	3
Como	2024–25	Serie A	23	0	0	0	—		23	0
Cagliari (loan)	2025–26	Serie A	12	0	0	0	—		12	0
Career total			180	4	5	1	16	0	231	5
