= Gaetano Oristanio =

Italian footballer (born 2002)

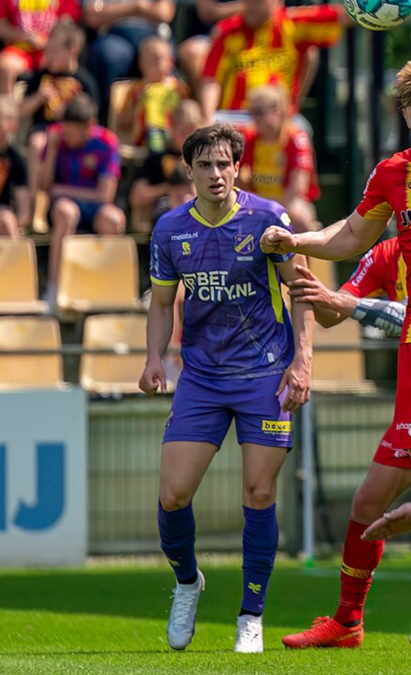
- Oristanio with Volendam

Personal information
- Full name: Gaetano Pio Oristanio
- Date of birth: 28 September 2002 (age 24)
- Place of birth: Vallo della Lucania, Italy
- Height: 1.74 m (5 ft 9 in)
- Position: Attacking midfielder

Team information
- Current team: Torino (on loan from Venezia)
- Number: 11

Youth career
- –2021: Inter Milan

Senior career*
| Years | Team | Apps | (Gls) |
| 2021–2024 | Inter Milan | 0 | (0) |
| 2021–2023 | → Volendam (loan) | 62 | (8) |
| 2023–2024 | → Cagliari (loan) | 25 | (2) |
| 2024– | Venezia | 37 | (3) |
| 2025–2026 | → Parma (loan) | 20 | (1) |
| 2026– | → Torino (loan) | 0 | (0) |

International career^{‡}
| 2018–2019 | Italy U17 | 12 | (2) |
| 2019–2020 | Italy U18 | 7 | (1) |
| 2021–2022 | Italy U20 | 8 | (4) |
| 2022–2024 | Italy U21 | 7 | (0) |
- * Club domestic league appearances and goals as of 23 August 2026 ‡ National team caps and goals as of 26 March 2024

Gaetano Pio Oristanio (born 28 September 2002) is an Italian professional footballer who plays as an attacking midfielder for Serie A club Torino, on loan from Venezia.

== Club career ==
Oristanio played in the youth academy of Inter Milan until 2021.

In August 2021, Oristanio joined Eerste Divisie club Volendam on loan for the 2021–22 season. He made his debut for the club as a substitute in the 66th minute of the 1–3 league loss to ADO Den Haag on 13 August 2021. Following 35 appearances, 7 goals and achieving promotion to the Eredivisie on his first season, on 15 July 2022, Oristanio re-joined Volendam on another one-year loan.

On 20 July 2023, Oristanio joined Serie A club Cagliari on a one-year loan, with an option to buy and counter option in favour of Inter Milan.

On 13 July 2024, he was transferred to newly promoted Serie A club Venezia for a €4 million estimated fee. On 9 July 2026, Oristanio was loaned by Torino, with an option to buy.

== Career statistics ==
=== Club ===
As of match played 27 February 2026

Appearances and goals by club, season and competition
| Club | Season | League | | | National cup (Note: Includes Coppa Italia) | | Total | |
| Club | Season | Division | Apps | Goals | Apps | Goals | Apps | Goals |
|---|---|---|---|---|---|---|---|---|
| Volendam (loan) | 2021–22 | Eerste Divisie | 35 | 7 | 0 | 0 | 35 | 7 |
| Volendam (loan) | 2022–23 | Eredivisie | 27 | 1 | 0 | 0 | 27 | 1 |
| Volendam (loan) | Total | | 62 | 8 | 0 | 0 | 62 | 8 |
| Cagliari (loan) | 2023–24 | Serie A | 25 | 2 | 2 | 0 | 27 | 2 |
| Venezia | 2024–25 | Serie A | 37 | 3 | 0 | 0 | 37 | 3 |
| Parma | 2025–26 | Serie A | 16 | 1 | 1 | 0 | 17 | 1 |
| Career total | | | 140 | 14 | 3 | 0 | 143 | 14 |
