= Tommaso Martinelli (footballer) =

Italian footballer (born 2006)

Personal information
- Date of birth: 6 January 2006 (age 20)
- Place of birth: Bagno a Ripoli, Italy
- Height: 1.94 m (6 ft 4 in)
- Position: Goalkeeper

Team information
- Current team: Avellino (on loan from Fiorentina)
- Number: 50

Youth career
- Fiorentina

Senior career*
Years	Team	Apps	(Gls)
2023−	Fiorentina	1	(0)
2026	→ Sampdoria (loan)	16	(0)
2026–	→ Avellino (loan)	11	(0)

International career^{‡}
2021−2022	Italy U16	7	(0)
2022−2023	Italy U17	9	(0)
2023	Italy U18	1	(0)
2024−2025	Italy U19	12	(0)
2026–	Italy U20	1	(0)
- * Club domestic league appearances and goals as of 7 November 2026 ‡ National team caps and goals as of 27 March 2026

Tommaso Martinelli (born 6 January 2006) is an Italian professional footballer who plays as a goalkeeper for Serie B club Avellino, on loan from Fiorentina.

== Early life ==
Martinelli was born on 6 January 2006 in Bagno a Ripoli, Italy and grew up in Florence, Italy. The son of Leonardo Martinelli, he has a sister and a brother.

== Club career ==
Martinelli joined the youth academy of Serie A side Fiorentina at the age of nine and was promoted to the club's senior team in 2023. On 11 October 2023, he was named by English newspaper The Guardian as one of the best players born in 2006 worldwide. On 2 June 2024, he debuted for them during a 3–2 away victory in the league. In the 2024–25 and 2025–26 seasons, Martinelli made several appearances for Fiorentina in the UEFA Conference League.

On 7 January 2026, Martinelli was loaned by Sampdoria in Serie B.

On 10 July 2026, Martinelli moved on a new Serie B loan to Avellino.

== Style of play ==
Martinelli plays as a goalkeeper and is right-footed. English The Guardian wrote in 2023 that he is an "agile shot stopper who fills the goal at 1.93 m... [and] has impressed with his distribution".

== Career statistics ==
As of match played 27 October 2026

Appearances and goals by club, season and competition
Club	Season	League			Coppa Italia		Europe		Total	
Club	Season	Division	Apps	Goals	Apps	Goals	Apps	Goals	Apps	Goals
Fiorentina	2023–24	Serie A	1	0	0	0	0	0	1	0
Fiorentina	2024–25	Serie A	0	0	0	0	1 (Note: Appearance(s) in UEFA Conference League)	0	1	0
Fiorentina	2025–26	Serie A	0	0	0	0	2	0	2	0
Fiorentina	Total		1	0	0	0	3	0	4	0
Sampdoria (loan)	2025–26	Serie B	16	0	—		—		16	0
Avellino (loan)	2026–27	Serie B	9	0	1	0	—		10	0
Career total			26	0	1	0	3	0	30	0
