= Simone Pafundi =

Italian footballer (born 2006)

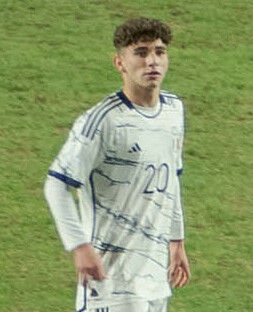
- Pafundi with Italy U20 in 2023

Personal information
- Full name: Simone Pafundi
- Date of birth: 14 March 2006 (age 20)
- Place of birth: Monfalcone, Italy
- Height: 1.66 m (5 ft 5 in)
- Positions: Attacking midfielder; winger

Team information
- Current team: Catanzaro (on loan from Udinese)
- Number: 20

Youth career
- 2011–2014: UFM Monfalcone
- 2014–2022: Udinese

Senior career*
Years	Team	Apps	(Gls)
2022–	Udinese	19	(0)
2024	→ Lausanne-Sport (loan)	19	(1)
2025–2026	→ Sampdoria (loan)	26	(1)
2026–	→ Catanzaro (loan)	7	(0)

International career^{‡}
2021	Italy U16	1	(0)
2021–2022	Italy U17	5	(4)
2023–2024	Italy U19	13	(7)
2023–	Italy U20	9	(1)
2024–	Italy U21	5	(0)
2022–	Italy	1	(0)
Medal record
Men's football
Representing Italy
FIFA U-20 World Cup
Runner-up	2023 Argentina
- * Club domestic league appearances and goals as of 7 November 2026 ‡ National team caps and goals as of 3 October 2026

Simone Pafundi (born 14 March 2006) is an Italian professional footballer who plays as a forward for Serie B club Catanzaro, on loan from Udinese.

== Club career ==
=== Udinese ===
Born in Monfalcone, the city his parents had moved to from Naples, Pafundi started his footballing career with his hometown club UFM Monfalcone, until he was noticed by Udinese scouts during a youth tournament in 2014, and was signed by the Serie A side soon thereafter.

Throughout the 2021–22 season, Pafundi emerged as a star player and a regular for the club's under-19 team, having scored six goals and provided seven assists in 16 games in the Campionato Primavera 2 at just sixteen years of age: around this period of time, he signed his first professional contract with Udinese and received his first call-ups to the club's first team.

On 22 May 2022, at 16 years old, Pafundi made his professional debut for Udinese, coming on as a substitute for Roberto Pereyra at the 68th minute of the team's final league game of the season, a 4–0 away win over Salernitana. In the same occasion, he became the first player born in 2006 to take part in a Serie A match.

In October 2023, Pafundi was included in The Guardian's list of the 60 best talents in the world born in 2006.

==== Loan to Lausanne-Sport ====
On 25 January 2024, Pafundi joined Swiss Super League club Lausanne-Sport on loan until the end of the year, with the deal including an option-to-buy reported to be in the region of €15 million. On 10 March 2024, Simone Pafundi scored his first professional goal in the Swiss Super League during his 7th match played.

==== Loan to Sampdoria ====
On 22 August 2025, Pafundi returned to Italy and joined Serie B club Sampdoria on loan with an option to buy and a buyback option in favour of Udinese.

== International career ==
=== Youth ===
Pafundi represented Italy at several youth international levels, having played for the under-16 and under-17 national teams.

In May 2023, he was included in the Italian squad that took part in the FIFA U-20 World Cup in Argentina, where the Azzurrini finished runners-up after losing to Uruguay in the final match.

On 19 November 2024, Pafundi made his debut with the U21 national team, in a friendly match against Ukraine.

=== Senior ===
In May 2022, Pafundi was called-up by head coach Roberto Mancini to join a training camp with the Italy senior national team, as part of a stage reserved to the most promising players in the country.

In November of the same year, he received his first official call-up to the senior national team for two friendlies against Albania and Austria. He eventually made his debut with the Azzurri on 16 November 2022, at 16 years old, playing the final minutes against Albania, thus becoming the third-youngest debutant in the history of the Italy national team, and the youngest debutant in the last 100 years.

== Style of play ==
A short, left-footed trequartista, Pafundi has been regarded mainly for his ball control, vision and pace, which allow him to be a frequent threat in the final third, both as an assist-man and as a finisher. He has been compared to former Udinese captain and striker Antonio Di Natale. Some even believe he has the potential to be the heir of Lionel Messi, given his stature and ball handling skills which resemble the Argentinian phenom.

== Personal life ==
Pafundi has an older brother, Andrea (b. 2004), who played with him in the youth ranks of Udinese, before retiring in 2023 to start a career in futsal.

== Career statistics ==
=== Club ===
As of match played 8 May 2026

Appearances and goals by club, season and competition
Club	Season	League			Cup (Note: Appearance(s) in the Coppa Italia and the Swiss Cup.)		Other		Total	
Club	Season	Division	Apps	Goals	Apps	Goals	Apps	Goals	Apps	Goals
Udinese	2021–22	Serie A	1	0	0	0	—		1	0
Udinese	2022–23	Serie A	8	0	0	0	—		8	0
Udinese	2023–24	Serie A	1	0	1	0	—		2	0
Udinese	2024–25	Serie A	9	0	0	0	—		9	0
Udinese	2025–26	Serie A	0	0	1	0	—		1	0
Udinese	Total		19	0	2	0	0	0	21	0
Lausanne-Sport (loan)	2023–24	Swiss Super League	17	1	0	0	—		17	1
Lausanne-Sport (loan)	2024–25	Swiss Super League	2	0	1	0	—		3	0
Lausanne-Sport (loan)	Total		19	1	1	0	0	0	20	1
Sampdoria (loan)	2025–26	Serie B	26	1	0	0	—		26	1
Career total			64	2	3	0	0	0	67	2

=== International ===
As of match played 16 November 2022

Appearances and goals by national team and year
National team	Year	Apps	Goals
Italy	2022	1	0
Total		1	0

== Honours ==
Italy U20

- FIFA U-20 World Cup runner-up: 2023
