= Luigi Cherubini (footballer) =

Italian footballer

Personal information
- Date of birth: 15 January 2004 (age 22)
- Place of birth: Tivoli, Italy
- Height: 1.75 m (5 ft 9 in)
- Position: Winger

Team information
- Current team: Benevento (on loan from Roma)
- Number: 10

Youth career
- Guidonia
- 2013–2017: Roma
- 2017–2018: Lazio
- 2018–2024: Roma

Senior career*
Years	Team	Apps	(Gls)
2023–	Roma	0	(0)
2024–2025	→ Carrarese (loan)	34	(3)
2025–2026	→ Sampdoria (loan)	35	(2)
2026–	→ Benevento (loan)	1	(0)

International career^{‡}
2021	Italy U18	1	(0)
2023–2024	Italy U20	3	(0)
2025–	Italy U21	12	(2)
2026–	Italy	1	(0)
- * Club domestic league appearances and goals as of 22 August 2026 ‡ National team caps and goals as of 16 November 2026

Luigi Cherubini (born 15 January 2004) is an Italian professional footballer who plays as a winger for Serie B club Benevento, on loan from Roma, and the Italy national team.

== Club career ==
=== Roma ===
Cherubini began playing football with Guidonia before moving to Roma at 9, and he finished all of his development there except for the 2017–18 season where he played for crosstown rivals Lazio. On 18 July 2021, he signed his first professional contract with Roma. In October 2022, he started training with the senior team for the first time. He was captain of the Roma Primavera side and helped them win the Supercoppa Primavera, Coppa Italia Primavera, and U17 Championship. He made his senior debut with Roma as a substitute in a 2–0 UEFA Europa League win over Sparta Prague on 26 October 2023.

==== Loan to Carrarese ====
On 27 July 2024, Cherubini was loaned to Carrarese.

==== Loan to Sampdoria ====
On 21 August 2025, Cherubini moved on loan to Sampdoria in Serie B.

Loan to Benevento

On 18 August 2026, Cherubini was loaned to Benevento in Serie B.

== International career ==
Cherubini is a youth international for Italy. He played for the Italy U18s in August 2021 for a set of friendlies.

In May 2026, he was one of the players who were called up with the Italy national senior squad by interim head coach Silvio Baldini, for the friendly matches against Luxembourg and Greece on 3 and 7 June 2026, respectively.

== Career statistics ==
=== Club ===
As of match played 1 May 2026

Appearances and goals by club, season and competition
Club	Season	League			Coppa Italia		Europe		Other		Total	
Club	Season	Division	Apps	Goals	Apps	Goals	Apps	Goals	Apps	Goals	Apps	Goals
Roma	2023–24	Serie A	0	0	—		1 (Note: Appearance in UEFA Europa League)	0	—		1	0
Carrarese (loan)	2024–25	Serie B	34	3	1	1	—		—		35	4
Sampdoria (loan)	2025–26	Serie B	35	2	0	0	—		—		35	2
Career total			69	5	1	1	1	0	0	0	71	6

=== International ===
As of match played 3 June 2026

Appearances and goals by national team and year
National team	Year	Apps	Goals
Italy	2026	1	0
Total		1	0
