= Andrei Coubiș =

Romanian footballer (born 2003)

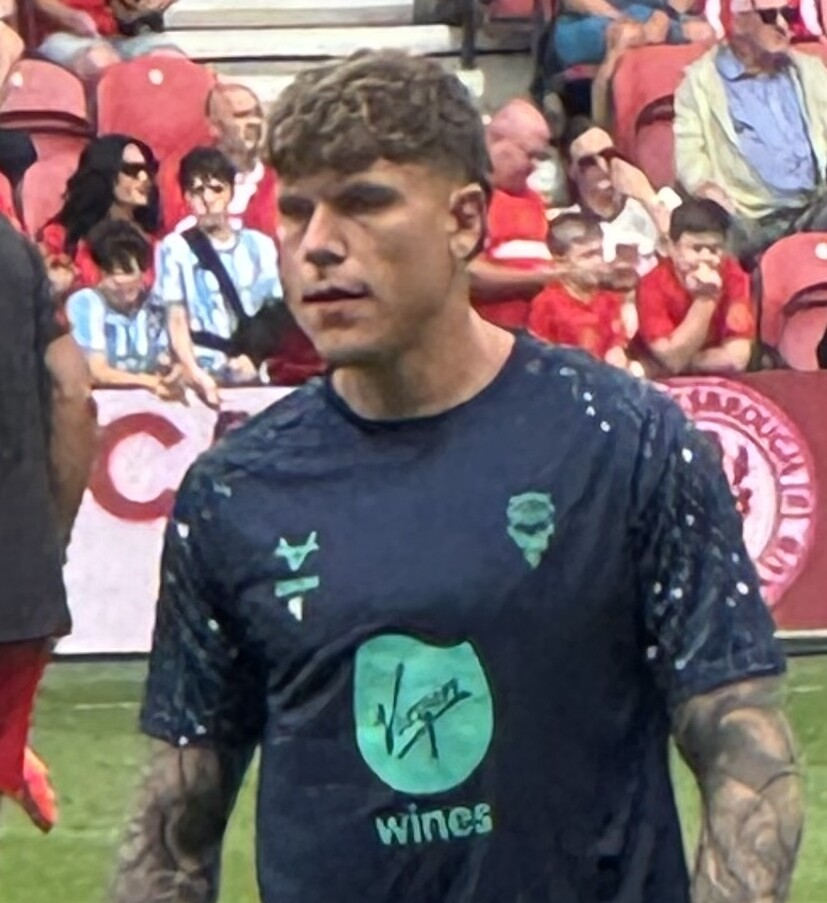
- Coubiș with Lincoln City in 2026

Personal information
- Date of birth: 29 September 2003 (age 23)
- Place of birth: Milan, Italy
- Height: 1.95 m (6 ft 5 in)
- Position: Centre-back

Team information
- Current team: Lincoln City
- Number: 4

Youth career
- –2019: Lombardia Uno
- 2019–2024: AC Milan

Senior career*
Years	Team	Apps	(Gls)
2022–2026	AC Milan	0	(0)
2024–2025	Milan Futuro	34	(1)
2025–2026	→ Sampdoria (loan)	0	(0)
2026	Sampdoria	0	(0)
2026	→ Universitatea Cluj (loan)	15	(1)
2026	Universitatea Cluj	0	(0)
2026–	Lincoln City	12	(1)

International career^{‡}
2021–2022	Romania U19	9	(1)
2021	Romania U20	2	(0)
2022	Romania U21	1	(0)
2026–	Romania	9	(0)
- * Club domestic league appearances and goals as of 16:59, 21 November 2026 (UTC) ‡ National team caps and goals as of 19:11, 17 November 2026 (UTC)

Andrei Coubiș (born 29 September 2003) is a professional footballer who plays as a centre-back for EFL Championship club Lincoln City. Born in Italy, he plays for the Romania national team.

== Early life ==
Coubiș was born in Milan, Lombardy to Romanian parents that arrived there from Suceava. He started playing football in his hometown, joining the AC Milan main academy as an under-17.

== Club career ==
=== AC Milan ===
Coubiș entered the Primavera squad of AC Milan in 2021, a side he eventually captained.

He made his senior debut for the rossoneri during a friendly match against rman club 1. FC Köln on the summer of 2022, before figuring on the bench in the Champions League that same year, for the group phase matches against English club Chelsea (both home and away), and the away match against Croatian club Dinamo Zagreb, without making his official debut however. He also then made headlines in the Youth League, as he scored against RB Salzburg for the opening game of the Milanisti.

On the summer of 2024, he was assigned to the newly created reserve team Milan Futuro, set to compete in the Serie C Group B.

Coubiș made his professional debut with Milan Futuro on 17 August 2024, coming on as a substitute for Álex Jiménez at the 74th minute of a 2–1 away win Coppa Italia Serie C round of 16 match against Novara.

After Kevin Zeroli left on loan for Serie A club Monza, Coubiș replaced him as the captain of Milan Futuro, and he captained his first match on 8 February 2025, starting and featuring full time for a 2–0 home loss Serie C against Lucchese.

He scored his first professional goal with Milan Futuro on 23 February 2025, in a 3–2 home loss in a Serie C match against Pescara.

Coubiș was called up by first team head coach Massimiliano Allegri for the pre-season friendly match against Premier League club Leeds United on 9 August 2025. He came off the bench in the second half, in place of Yunus Musah, in a 1–1 draw.

==== Loan to Sampdoria ====
On 30 August 2025, he joined Serie B club Sampdoria on a one-year loan for the 2025–26 season, with a conditional obligation to buy.

=== Sampdoria ===
Coubiș joined Sampdoria permanently on 8 January 2026, for an estimated transfer fee of €150,000.

==== Loan to Universitatea Cluj ====
On 9 January 2026, he joined Liga I club Universitatea Cluj on loan until the end of the 2025–26 season.

=== Universitatea Cluj ===
He permanently joined Universitatea Cluj on 1 July 2026 for a fee worth €125,000, and he made one final appearance for the club during the 0–0 draw against Dynamo Kyiv in the UEFA Europa League first qualifying round on 9 July 2026.

=== Lincoln City ===
On 24 July 2026, Coubiș signed a five-year contract with EFL Championship club Lincoln City, for an undisclosed club record fee for Lincoln City, believed to be around £2.6 million. He made his debut on the opening day of the season, coming off the bench late on in a 1–2 defeat against Middlesbrough. He scored his first goal in October against Millwall, scoring with a low strike from 18 yards, within the opening 25 seconds of the game.

== International career ==
Coubiș was a youth international for Romania, as he played the European Under-19 Championship with Romania. In April 2023, he switched allegiance to Italy, declaring he would play for Azzurri. However, Coubiș failed to be capped by Italy. On 4 March 2026, his request to switch international allegiance back to Romania was approved by FIFA.

== Career statistics ==
=== Club ===
As of 21 November 2026

Appearances and goals by club, season and competition
Club	Season	League			National cup (Note: Includes Coppa Italia Serie C, Cupa României)		League cup (Note: Includes EFL Cup)		Europe		Other		Total	
Club	Season	Division	Apps	Goals	Apps	Goals	Apps	Goals	Apps	Goals	Apps	Goals	Apps	Goals
AC Milan	2022–23	Serie A	—		—		—		0	0	—		0	0
Milan Futuro	2024–25	Serie C	34	1	3	0	—		—		0	0	37	1
Sampdoria (loan)	2025–26	Serie B	0	0	—		—		—		—		0	0
Universitatea Cluj (loan)	2025–26	Liga I	15	1	4	1	—		—		—		19	2
Universitatea Cluj	2026–27	Liga I	0	0	—		—		1 (Note: Appearance in UEFA Europa League)	0	0	0	1	0
Universitatea Cluj	Total		15	0	4	1	—		1	0	0	0	20	2
Lincoln City	2026–27	EFL Championship	12	1	0	0	2	0	—		—		14	1
Career total			61	3	7	1	2	0	1	0	0	0	71	4

=== International ===
As of 17 November 2026

Appearances and goals by national team and year
National team	Year	Apps	Goals
Romania
Romania	2026	9	0
Total		9	0

== Honours ==
Universitatea Cluj

- Cupa României runner-up: 2025–26
- Supercupa României runner-up: 2026
