= Víctor Narro =

Spanish footballer

Personal information
- Full name: Víctor Narro Valero
- Date of birth: 27 May 1999 (age 27)
- Place of birth: Palma, Spain
- Height: 1.84 m (6 ft 0 in)
- Position: Winger

Team information
- Current team: Hércules (on loan from Sampdoria)

Youth career
- –2017: Mallorca
- 2015–2016: → La Salle (loan)
- 2017–2018: Villarreal

Senior career*
Years	Team	Apps	(Gls)
2018–2019	Roda	35	(3)
2019–2020	Villarreal C	27	(4)
2020–2021	Villarreal B	21	(0)
2021–2022	Valladolid B	27	(6)
2021–2022	Valladolid	3	(0)
2022–2023	Deportivo La Coruña	14	(0)
2023	Atlético Baleares	17	(1)
2023–2024	Lugo	30	(2)
2024–2025	Gimnàstic	35	(6)
2025–	Sampdoria	4	(0)
2026–	→ Real Murcia (loan)	16	(0)
- * Club domestic league appearances and goals as of 10 June 2026

Víctor Narro Valero (born 27 May 1999) is a Spanish professional footballer who plays mainly as a right-winger for Primera Federación – Group 2 club Hércules, on loan from Serie B club Sampdoria.

== Career ==
Narro was born in Palma de Mallorca, Balearic Islands, and represented RCD Mallorca and SD La Salle before joining Villarreal CF's youth setup in January 2017, for a €40,000 fee. On 14 July 2018, after finishing his formation, he was assigned to farm team CD Roda in Tercera División.

Narro made his senior debut on 26 August 2018 by starting in a 2–1 home win over Paterna CF, and scored his first goal on 25 November by netting the opener in a 2–2 away draw against Orihuela CF. After finishing the campaign with three goals in 35 appearances, he returned to the Yellow Submarine and was included in the C-team also in the fourth tier.

Narro spent the 2020–21 season with the reserves in Segunda División B, before departing the club on 31 July 2021. Three days later, he moved to another reserve team, Real Valladolid Promesas in Primera División RFEF on a one-year contract.

Narro made his first team debut on 13 November 2021, coming on as a late substitute for Álvaro Aguado in a 3–0 Segunda División home success over CF Fuenlabrada.

On 24 June 2022, Narro agreed to a two-year contract with third division side Deportivo de La Coruña. He continued to appear in that division in the following years, representing CD Atlético Baleares, CD Lugo and Gimnàstic de Tarragona.

On 13 August 2025, Narro signed a three-year contract with Italian side Sampdoria in Serie B. On 16 January 2026, he moved to Primera Federación club Real Murcia on loan with an option to buy.
