= Antoine Makoumbou =

French-Congolese footballer (born 1998)

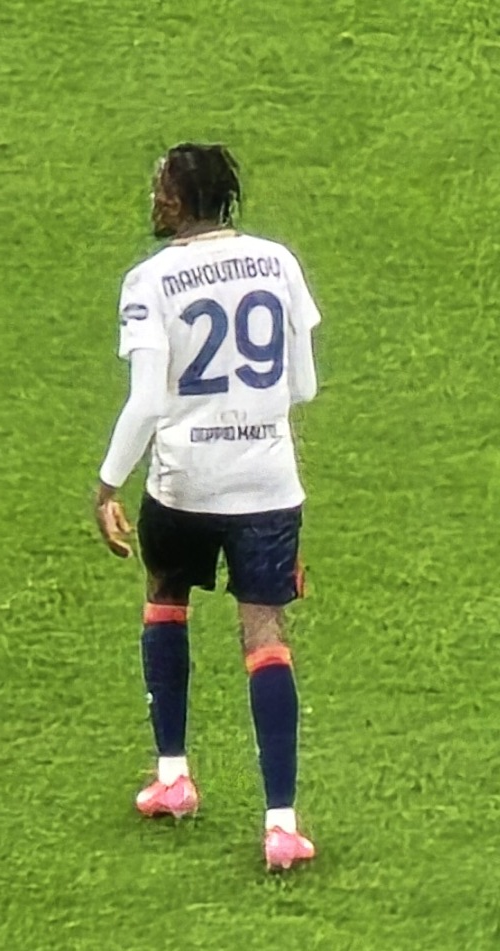
- Makoumbou in 2025 with Cagliari

Personal information
- Date of birth: 18 July 1998 (age 28)
- Place of birth: Paris, France
- Height: 1.87 m (6 ft 2 in)
- Position: Midfielder

Team information
- Current team: Sampdoria (on loan from Samsunspor)
- Number: 45

Youth career
- Monaco

Senior career*
Years	Team	Apps	(Gls)
2018	Ajaccio B	0	(0)
2018–2019	Mainz 05 II	7	(1)
2020–2022	Tabor Sežana	24	(0)
2021–2022	→ Maribor (loan)	33	(0)
2022–2025	Cagliari	101	(2)
2025–	Samsunspor	32	(1)
2026–	→ Sampdoria (loan)	0	(0)

International career^{‡}
2021–	Congo	17	(1)
- * Club domestic league appearances and goals as of 30 May 2026 ‡ National team caps and goals as of 25 March 2024

Antoine Makoumbou (born 18 July 1998) is a professional footballer who plays as a midfielder for Serie B club Sampdoria, on loan from Süper Lig club Samsunspor. Born in France, he plays for the Congo national team.

== Club career ==
For the second half of the 2017–18 season, Makoumbou signed for Ajaccio B in the French fifth division after playing for the youth academy of French Ligue 1 side Monaco.

In 2020, Makoumbou signed for Tabor Sežana in the Slovenian top flight after playing for Mainz 05 II, the reserves of German Bundesliga club Mainz 05.

On 20 July 2021, he joined Maribor on a season-long loan. During the season, Maribor activated the option to buy and made the transfer permanent.

On 15 July 2022, Makoumbou signed a four-year contract with Italian Serie B side Cagliari for a reported transfer fee of around €2 million.

On 2 July 2025, Makoumbou joined Turkish side Samsunspor by signing a four-year contract.

== International career ==
Born in France, Makoumbou is Congolese through descent. He debuted for the Congo national team in a friendly 1–0 win over Niger on 9 June 2021. In December 2023, Makoumbou announced his retirement from the national team due to the poor travel and living conditions the Congolese Football Federation forced their players into during the November 2023 international break.

== Career statistics ==
=== International ===
As of match played 9 September 2024

Appearances and goals by national team and year
National team	Year	Apps	Goals
Congo	2021	6	0
Congo	2022	6	1
Congo	2023	4	0
Congo	2024	3	1
Total		19	1

Scores and results list Congo's goal tally first, score column indicates score after each Makoumbou goal.

List of international goals scored by Antoine Makoumbou
No.	Date	Venue	Opponent	Score	Result	Competition
1	8 June 2022	Stade Alphonse Massemba-Débat, Brazzaville, Congo	Gambia	1–0	1–0	2023 Africa Cup of Nations qualification
