= Riccardo Palmieri =

Italian footballer (born 1995)

Personal information
- Date of birth: 26 September 1995 (age 31)
- Place of birth: Lodi, Italy
- Height: 1.82 m (6 ft 0 in)
- Position: Midfielder

Team information
- Current team: Cosenza
- Number: 37

Youth career
- –2014: Inter Milan
- 2013–2014: → Modena (loan)

Senior career*
Years	Team	Apps	(Gls)
2014–2015	Piacenza	21	(0)
2015–2016	Olginatese	5	(1)
2016–2017	Sondrio		
2017–2021	Fanfulla	76	(10)
2021	Calvina	5	(0)
2021–2022	Fiorenzuola	20	(5)
2022–2023	Virtus Entella	21	(1)
2023–2025	Carrarese	53	(4)
2025	Cittadella	13	(1)
2025–2026	Trapani	13	(0)
2026–	Cosenza	13	(0)
- * Club domestic league appearances and goals as of 1 May 2026

Riccardo Palmieri (born 26 September 1995) is an Italian professional footballer who plays as a midfielder for Serie C Group C club Cosenza.

== Career ==
Born in Lodi, Palmieri was formed as a player in Inter Milan's youth sector. As a senior, he played in Serie D between 2014 and 2021.

On 2 August 2021, he signed with Serie C club Fiorenzuola. Palmieri made his professional debut on 28 August 2021 against FeralpiSalò.

On 31 January 2022, he moved to Virtus Entella.

On 19 January 2023, Palmieri signed a 1.5-year contract with Carrarese.
