= Tjaš Begić =

Slovenian footballer (born 2003)

Personal information
- Date of birth: 30 June 2003 (age 23)
- Place of birth: Izola, Slovenia
- Height: 1.75 m (5 ft 9 in)
- Position: Attacking midfielder

Team information
- Current team: Sampdoria
- Number: 11

Youth career
- Izola
- –2018: Koper
- 2018–2020: Gorica

Senior career*
Years	Team	Apps	(Gls)
2020–2021	Gorica	29	(3)
2021–2022	Celje	34	(2)
2022–2023	Vicenza	27	(3)
2023–2026	Parma	9	(0)
2024–2025	→ Frosinone (loan)	22	(1)
2026	→ Sampdoria (loan)	19	(3)
2026–	Sampdoria	6	(1)

International career^{‡}
2018–2019	Slovenia U16	9	(0)
2019	Slovenia U17	8	(1)
2021	Slovenia U18	2	(1)
2020	Slovenia U19	2	(0)
2021–2025	Slovenia U21	20	(3)
2026–	Slovenia	6	(0)
- * Club domestic league appearances and goals as of 10 October 2026 ‡ National team caps and goals as of 13 November 2026

Tjaš Begić (born 30 June 2003) is a Slovenian professional footballer who plays as an attacking midfielder for Serie B club Sampdoria and the Slovenia national team.

== Club career ==
Begić started playing football at hometown club Izola, before moving to Koper. In 2018, he joined Gorica, where he progressed through the youth ranks and was promoted to the first team in 2020. He subsequently made his professional debut on 8 March 2020, at 16 years and 9 months, coming in as a substitute for Victor Aliaga in the second half of the second division match against Dob, which ended in a 2–0 loss for his team. He then made his first start on 30 August 2020, as he also scored his first senior goal in a 5–0 win against Triglav Kranj, which made Gorica win the promotional play-off and gain promotion back to the national top tier.

After one more season with Gorica in the PrvaLiga, where he scored three goals and made two assists in 28 matches, Begić joined Celje on a permanent deal in the summer of 2021. At Celje, Begić established himself as a regular starter, amassing a total amount of 37 appearances between the league and the national cup during the 2021–22 campaign.

On 5 July 2022, Begić officially joined Serie C side Vicenza on a permanent deal, signing a four-year contract with the club. On 22 January 2023, he scored his first goal for the Italian club, finding the net in a 3–0 league win over AlbinoLeffe. On 12 April 2023, he featured in a 3–2 win over Juventus Next Gen in the second leg of the Coppa Italia Serie C, helping Vicenza lift the trophy for the second time in their history.

On 14 July 2023, Begić transferred to Serie B club Parma for an undisclosed fee, signing a four-year contract.

On 2 August 2024, he joined Serie B side Frosinone on a season-long loan.

== International career ==
Begić represented Slovenia at all youth international levels from under-16 to under-21.

Although he received his first call-up to the under-21 team in May 2021, he did not make his official competitive debut with the squad until 6 September of the same year, during the match against Andorra. He went on to take part in several matches of the European Under-21 Championship qualifiers, which ultimately saw Slovenia fail to progress to the final stage.

== Career statistics ==
=== Club ===
As of 14 July 2023

Appearances and goals by club, season and competition
Club	Season	League			National cup		Continental		Other		Total	
Club	Season	Division	Apps	Goals	Apps	Goals	Apps	Goals	Apps	Goals	Apps	Goals
Gorica	2019–20	Second League	1	0	0	0	—		2 (Note: Appearances in Slovenian PrvaLiga promotion/relegation play-offs)	1	3	1
Gorica	2020–21	PrvaLiga	28	3	0	0	—		—		28	3
Gorica	Total		29	3	0	0	0	0	2	1	31	4
Celje	2021–22	PrvaLiga	34	2	3	1	—		—		37	3
Vicenza	2022–23	Serie C	27	3	—		—		9 (Note: Five appearances in Coppa Italia Serie C, four appearances in Serie C promotion play-offs)	0	36	3
Career total			90	8	3	1	0	0	11	1	104	10

=== International ===
As of match played 13 November 2026

Appearances and goals by national team and year
National team	Year	Apps	Goals
Slovenia	2026	6	0
Total		6	0

== Honours ==
Vicenza

- Coppa Italia Serie C: 2022–23

Parma

- Serie B: 2023–24
