= Nicolás Schiavi =

Argentine footballer

Personal information
- Full name: Nicolás Adrián Schiavi
- Date of birth: 1 February 1995 (age 31)
- Place of birth: Rafaela, Argentina
- Height: 1.73 m (5 ft 8 in)
- Position: Midfielder

Team information
- Current team: Carrarese
- Number: 18

Youth career
- Atlético de Rafaela
- 2013–2014: Novara

Senior career*
Years	Team	Apps	(Gls)
2014–2021	Novara	95	(10)
2016–2017	→ Modena (loan)	29	(2)
2018	→ Cuneo (loan)	12	(2)
2021–2022	Juve Stabia	24	(1)
2022–	Carrarese	127	(21)
- * Club domestic league appearances and goals as of 13 May 2026

Nicolás Adrián Schiavi (Spanish pronunciation: [nikoˈlas esˈkjaβi]; born 1 February 1995) is an Argentine professional footballer who plays as a midfielder for Serie B club Carrarese.

== Career ==
Born in Argentina, Schiavi started his professional career in Italy. He was a player for Novara youth team in 2013 Trofeo Dossena. He was promoted from Novara's under-19 team in 2014, for 2014–15 Lega Pro season. However, after the club promoted back to Serie B, Schiavi played only 2 times in 2015–16 Serie B season. He was assigned number 20 shirt. On 16 July 2016 Schiavi left for Modena. He was assigned number 32 shirt of Modena.

In 2017–18 season, he was assigned number 16 shirt of Novara.

On 11 August 2021, he signed with Juve Stabia.

On 10 August 2022, Schiavi moved to Carrarese on a two-year contract.

== Career statistics ==
As of match played 24 April 2022

Appearances and goals by club, season and competition
Club	Season	League			Coppa Italia		Other		Total	
Club	Season	Division	Apps	Goals	Apps	Goals	Apps	Goals	Apps	Goals
Novara	2014–15	Lega Pro	13	0	0	0	—		13	0
Novara	2015–16	Serie B	2	0	0	0	—		2	0
Novara	2017–18	Serie B	4	0	1	0	—		5	0
Novara	2018–19	Serie C	31	4	4	2	2 (Note: Appearance(s) in Promotion Playoffs)	0	37	6
Novara	2019–20	Serie C	20	4	0	0	3	0	23	4
Novara	2020–21	Serie C	25	2	0	0	—		25	2
Novara	Novara total		95	10	5	2	5	0	105	12
Modena (loan)	2016–17	Serie C	29	2	2	0	—		31	2
Cuneo (loan)	2017–18	Serie C	12	2	—		2 (Note: Appearance(s) in Relegation Playoffs)	0	14	2
Juve Stabia	2021–22	Serie C	26	1	—		—		26	1
Career total			162	15	7	2	7	0	176	17
