= 2024–25 UC Sampdoria season =

UC Sampdoria
2024–25 season
- Manager: Andrea Pirlo (until 29 August); Andrea Sottil (30 August - 9 December); Leonardo Semplici (until 11 December - 7 April); Alberico Evani (from 7 April)
- Stadium: Stadio Luigi Ferraris
- Serie B: 17th
- Coppa Italia: Round of 16 vs AS Roma
- Top goalscorer: League: Massimo Coda (8); All: Massimo Coda (8)
- Highest home attendance: 31,370 (vs US Salernitana, 9 May 2025, Serie B)
- Lowest home attendance: 14,196 (vs Como, 11 August 2024, Coppa Italia)
- Average home league attendance: 22,088
Home colours	Away colours	Third colours

The 2024–25 season was UC Sampdoria's 79th season in existence and the club's second season in Serie B, the second division of Italian football. In addition to the domestic league, UC Sampdoria participated in this season's edition of the Coppa Italia. The season covers the period from 1 July 2024 to 30 June 2025.

== Season review ==
On 25 June, Sampdoria announced that Giovanni Leoni had extended his contract with the club until 30 June 2027.

On 1 July, Sampdoria announced that they had signed professional contracts with Luca Polli and Francesco Conti, both until 30 June 2026.

On 12 July, Sampdoria announced the signing of Massimo Coda from Genoa, on a contract until 30 June 2026.

On 15 July, Lorenzo Costantino joined Virtus Francavilla on loan for the season, and that Lorenzo Malagrida had joined Rimini on loan for the season whilst Brendi Malaj had joined Rimini on a permanent deal.

On 18 July, Sampdoria announced the signing of Lorenzo Venuti from Lecce, on a contract until 30 June 2026, whilst Marco Delle Monache left Sampdoria to join Lecce in a similar deal.

On 19 July, Sampdoria announced the loan signing of Ebenezer Akinsanmiro from Inter Milan, with an obligation to make the move permanent in the summer, with Akinsanmiro signing a contract until 30 June 2028. Also on 19 July, Manuel De Luca left Sampdoria to join Cremonese.

On 21 July, Sampdoria announced the loan signing of Simone Romagnoli from Frosinone, with an obligation to make the move permanent in the summer, with Romagnoli signing a contract until 30 June 2026. Also on 19 July, Erik Gerbi left Sampdoria to join AC Carpi.

On 25 July, Sampdoria announced the signing of Melle Meulensteen from Vitesse, on a contract until 30 June 2027.

On 28 July, Sampdoria announced the signing of Stipe Vulikić from Perugia, on a contract until 30 June 2027.

On 29 July. Sampdoria announced that Alex Ferrari had extended his contract with the club until 30 June 2027.

On 30 July, Emil Audero left Sampdoria to join Como.

On 1 August, Sampdoria announced the season-long loan signings of Simone Ghidotti, Nikolas Ioannou and Alessandro Bellemo all from Como with obligation to buy and all three players singing contracts until 30 June 2027. Also on 1 August, Gennaro Tutino joined Sampdoria on loan from Cosenza with an obligation to buy, signing a contract until 30 June 2028.

On 7 August, Sampdoria announced the season-long loan signing of Paolo Vismara from Atalanta.

On 10 August, Davide Veroli joined Sampdoria on loan from Cagliari with an obligation to buy, signing a contract until 30 June 2028.

On 14 August, Nikola Sekulov joined Sampdoria on loan from Juventus with an obligation to buy, signing a contract until 30 June 2028.

On 27 August, Sampdoria announced that Giovanni Leoni had left the club to sign permanently for Parma.

On 28 August, Alessandro Pio Riccio joined Sampdoria on loan from Juventus with an obligation to buy, signing a contract until 30 June 2027.

On 29 August, Andrea Pirlo was relieved of his duties as Head Coach of Sampdoria. The following day, 30 August, Andrea Sottil was appointed as Sampdoria's new Head Coach.

On 30 August, Ertijon Gega and Matteo Stoppa, both left Sampdoria to sign permanently for Catania, whilst Marco Silvestri had joined the club from Udinese on a contract until 30 June 2025.

On 9 December, Andrea Sottil was relieved of his duties as Head Coach of Sampdoria. Two days later, 11 December, Leonardo Semplici was appointed as Sampdoria's new Head Coach.

On 17 December, Simone Leonardi signed a new contract with Sampdoria, until 30 June 2029.

On 10 January, Sampdoria announced the loan signing of Pietro Beruatto from Pisa for the remainder of the season, with an obligation to make the move permanent in the summer where Beruatto had signed a contract until 30 June 2028.

On 15 January, Sampdoria announced the signing of M'Baye Niang, on a contract until 30 June 2025.

On 24 January, Sampdoria announced the loan signings of Marco Curto from Como and Rémi Oudin from Lecce, both on contracts until the end of the season with an obligation to make the move permanent in the summer. Curto signed a contract until 30 June 2028, whist Oudin signed a contract until 30 June 2027.

On 27 January, Sampdoria announced the loan signing of Giorgio Altare from Venezia, with an obligation to make the move permanent in the summer, with Altare signing a contract until 30 June 2028.

On 30 January, Marco Silvestri left Sampdoria to permanently join Empoli, and that Samuele Perisan had joined Sampdoria on loan from Empoli for the remainder of the season.

On 31 January, Sampdoria announced the loan signing of Giuseppe Sibilli from Bari, with an obligation to make the move permanent in the summer, with Sibilli signing a contract until 30 June 2028.

On 3 February, Sampdoria announced the signing of Alessio Cragno from Monza, on a contract until 30 June 2025, and the loan signing of Niccolò Chiorra from Empoli for the remainder of the season. Also on the same day, Sampdoria announced the loan signing of Fabio Abiuso from Modena, with an obligation to make the move permanent in the summer, with Abiuso signing a contract until 30 June 2028.

On 7 April, Leonardo Semplici was relieved of his duties as Head Coach of Sampdoria, with Alberico Evani being announced as his replacement on the same day.

== Squad ==
As of match played 22 June 2025

No.	Name	Nationality	Position	Date of birth (age)	Signed from	Signed in	Contract ends	Apps.	Goals
Goalkeepers
13	Samuele Perisan	(Italy)	GK	21 August 1997 (aged 27)	on loan from Empoli	2025	2025	1	0
22	Simone Ghidotti	(Italy)	GK	19 March 2000 (aged 25)	on loan from Como	2024	2025	11	0
77	Niccolò Chiorra	(Italy)	GK	16 March 2001 (aged 24)	on loan from Carrarese	2025	2025	0	0
94	Alessio Cragno	(Italy)	GK	28 June 1994 (aged 30)	Monza	2025	2025	15	0
Defenders
2	Marco Curto	(Italy)	DF	5 January 1999 (aged 26)	on loan from Como	2025	2025	15	0
5	Alessandro Pio Riccio	(Italy)	DF	6 February 2002 (aged 23)	Juventus	2024	2027	27	1
6	Simone Romagnoli	(Italy)	DF	9 February 1990 (aged 35)	on loan from Frosinone	2024	2025	13	0
18	Lorenzo Venuti	(Italy)	DF	12 April 1995 (aged 30)	Lecce	2024	2026	33	2
21	Pietro Beruatto	(Italy)	DF	21 December 1998 (aged 26)	on loan from Pisa	2025	2025	16	0
23	Fabio Depaoli	(Italy)	DF	24 April 1997 (aged 28)	ChievoVerona	2019		113	8
24	Bartosz Bereszyński	(Poland)	DF	12 July 1992 (aged 32)	Legia Warsaw	2017		212	1
25	Alex Ferrari	(Italy)	DF	1 July 1994 (aged 30)	Bologna	2019		85	1
26	Giorgio Altare	(Italy)	DF	9 August 1998 (aged 26)	on loan from Venezia	2025	2025	14	0
44	Nikolas Ioannou	(Cyprus)	DF	10 November 1995 (aged 29)	on loan from Como	2024	2025	28	3
72	Davide Veroli	(Italy)	DF	29 January 2003 (aged 22)	on loan from Cagliari	2024	2025	16	1
Midfielders
4	Ronaldo Vieira	(England)	MF	19 July 1998 (aged 26)	Leeds United	2018		112	0
7	Alessandro Bellemo	(Italy)	MF	7 August 1995 (aged 29)	on loan from Como	2024	2025	24	1
8	Matteo Ricci	(Italy)	MF	27 May 1994 (aged 31)	Frosinone	2023	2026	35	0
15	Ebenezer Akinsanmiro	(Nigeria)	MF	25 November 2004 (aged 20)	on loan from Inter Milan	2024	2025	38	1
17	Melle Meulensteen	(Netherlands)	MF	4 July 1999 (aged 25)	Vitesse	2024	2027	29	4
20	Rémi Oudin	(France)	MF	18 November 1996 (aged 28)	on loan from Lecce	2025	2025	13	1
28	Gerard Yepes	(Spain)	MF	25 August 2002 (aged 22)	Academy	2022		76	1
80	Leonardo Benedetti	(Italy)	MF	6 June 2000 (aged 25)	Spezia	2019		45	1
Forwards
9	Massimo Coda	(Italy)	FW	10 November 1988 (aged 36)	Genoa	2024	2026	36	8
10	Gennaro Tutino	(Italy)	FW	20 August 1996 (aged 28)	on loan from Cosenza	2024	2025	23	5
16	Fabio Borini	(Italy)	FW	29 March 1991 (aged 34)	Fatih Karagümrük	2023	2025	44	10
19	M'Baye Niang	(Senegal)	FW	19 December 1994 (aged 30)	Unattached	2025	2025	16	3
33	Giuseppe Sibilli	(Italy)	FW	7 August 1996 (aged 28)	on loan from Bari	2025	2025	14	2
84	Nikola Sekulov	(Italy)	FW	18 February 2002 (aged 23)	on loan from Juventus	2024	2025	18	1
90	Fabio Abiuso	(Italy)	FW	2 February 2003 (aged 22)	on loan from Modena	2025	2025	9	0
Out on loan
11	Estanis Pedrola	(Spain)	FW	24 August 2003 (aged 21)	Barcelona	2024	2027	26	3
20	Antonino La Gumina	(Italy)	FW	6 March 1996 (aged 29)	Empoli	2021	2027	40	3
21	Simone Giordano	(Italy)	DF	21 December 2001 (aged 23)	Academy	2021	2026	37	2
31	Stipe Vulikić	(Croatia)	DF	23 January 2001 (aged 24)	Perugia	2024	2027	14	0
	Nicola Ravaglia	(Italy)	GK	12 December 1988 (aged 36)	Cremonese	2020			
	Elia Tantalocchi	(Italy)	GK	30 June 2004 (aged 20)	Academy	2021			
	Stefano Girelli	(Italy)	MF	9 January 2001 (aged 24)	Cremonese	2023		18	0
Left during the season
1	Paolo Vismara	(Italy)	GK	28 March 2003 (aged 22)	on loan from Atalanta	2024	2025	11	0
3	Antonio Barreca	(Italy)	DF	18 March 1995 (aged 30)	Cagliari	2023	2025	26	0
14	Pajtim Kasami	(Switzerland)	MF	2 June 1992 (aged 33)	Olympiacos	2023		39	6
33	Marco Silvestri	(Italy)	GK	30 June 2004 (aged 20)	Udinese	2024	2025	8	0
	Emil Audero	(Italy)	GK	18 January 1997 (aged 28)	Juventus	2019		169	0

== Transfers ==
=== In ===
Date	Position	Nationality	Name	From	Fee	Ref.
12 July 2024	FW	(Italy)	Massimo Coda	Genoa	Undisclosed	
18 July 2024	DF	(Italy)	Lorenzo Venuti	Lecce	Undisclosed	
25 July 2024	MF	(Netherlands)	Melle Meulensteen	Vitesse	Undisclosed	
28 July 2024	DF	(Croatia)	Stipe Vulikić	Perugia	Undisclosed	
28 August 2024	DF	(Italy)	Alessandro Pio Riccio	Juventus	Undisclosed	
30 August 2024	GK	(Italy)	Marco Silvestri	Udinese	Undisclosed	
15 January 2025	FW	(Senegal)	M'Baye Niang	Unattached	Free	
3 February 2025	GK	(Italy)	Alessio Cragno	Monza	Undisclosed	

=== Loans in ===
Start date	Position	Nationality	Name	From	End date	Ref.
19 July 2024	MF	(Nigeria)	Ebenezer Akinsanmiro	Inter Milan	30 June 2025	
21 July 2024	DF	(Italy)	Simone Romagnoli	Frosinone	30 June 2025	
1 August 2024	GK	(Italy)	Simone Ghidotti	Como	30 June 2025	
1 August 2024	DF	(Cyprus)	Nikolas Ioannou	Como	30 June 2025	
1 August 2024	MF	(Italy)	Alessandro Bellemo	Como	30 June 2025	
1 August 2024	FW	(Italy)	Gennaro Tutino	Cosenza	30 June 2025	
7 August 2024	GK	(Italy)	Paolo Vismara	Atalanta	3 February 2025	
10 August 2024	DF	(Italy)	Davide Veroli	Cagliari	30 June 2025	
14 August 2024	MF	(Italy)	Nikola Sekulov	Juventus	30 June 2025	
10 January 2025	DF	(Italy)	Pietro Beruatto	Pisa	30 June 2025	
24 January 2025	DF	(Italy)	Marco Curto	Como	30 June 2025	
24 January 2025	MF	(France)	Rémi Oudin	Lecce	30 June 2025	
27 January 2025	DF	(Italy)	Giorgio Altare	Venezia	30 June 2026	
30 January 2025	GK	(Italy)	Samuele Perisan	Empoli	30 June 2025	
31 January 2025	FW	(Italy)	Giuseppe Sibilli	Bari	30 June 2025	
3 February 2025	GK	(Italy)	Niccolò Chiorra	Empoli	30 June 2025	
3 February 2025	FW	(Italy)	Fabio Abiuso	Modena	30 June 2025	

=== Out ===
Date	Position	Nationality	Name	To	Fee	Ref.
15 July 2024	MF	(Albania)	Brendi Malaj	Rimini	Undisclosed	
18 July 2024	MF	(Italy)	Marco Delle Monache	Lecce	Undisclosed	
19 July 2024	FW	(Italy)	Manuel De Luca	Cremonese	Undisclosed	
21 July 2024	DF	(Italy)	Erik Gerbi	AC Carpi	Undisclosed	
30 July 2024	GK	(Italy)	Emil Audero	Como	Undisclosed	
27 August 2024	DF	(Italy)	Giovanni Leoni	Parma	Undisclosed	
30 August 2024	DF	(Albania)	Ertijon Gega	Catania	Undisclosed	
30 August 2024	FW	(Italy)	Matteo Stoppa	Catania	Undisclosed	
6 September 2024	MF	(France)	Andréa Dacourt	Francs Borains	Undisclosed	
30 January 2025	GK	(Italy)	Marco Silvestri	Empoli	Undisclosed	
3 February 2025	DF	(Italy)	Antonio Barreca	Südtirol	Undisclosed	

=== Loans out ===
Start date	Position	Nationality	Name	To	End date	Ref.
15 July 2024	DF	(Italy)	Lorenzo Costantino	Virtus Francavilla	30 June 2025	
15 July 2024	MF	(Italy)	Lorenzo Malagrida	Rimini	30 June 2025	
1 August 2024	GK	(Italy)	Elia Tantalocchi	Pontedera	30 June 2025	
7 August 2024	MF	(Italy)	Francesco Conti	Sestri Levante	15 January 2025	
30 August 2024	FW	(Italy)	Luca Polli	Club Milano	30 June 2025	
7 January 2025	DF	(Italy)	Simone Giordano	Mantova	30 June 2025	
9 January 2025	MF	(Italy)	Stefano Girelli	US Salernitana	30 June 2025	
9 January 2025	FW	(Italy)	Antonino La Gumina	Cesena	30 June 2025	
15 January 2025	MF	(Italy)	Francesco Conti	Rimini	30 June 2025	
3 February 2025	GK	(Italy)	Nicola Ravaglia	Carrarese	30 June 2025	
3 February 2025	DF	(Croatia)	Stipe Vulikić	Modena	30 June 2025	
3 February 2025	FW	(Italy)	Simone Leonardi	Rimini	30 June 2025	
3 February 2025	FW	(Spain)	Estanis Pedrola	Bologna	30 June 2025	

=== Released ===
Date	Position	Nationality	Name	Joined	Date	Ref
10 July 2024	DF	(Italy)	Andrea Conti			
11 July 2024	MF	(Italy)	Valerio Verre	Palermo	9 August 2024	
6 September 2024	MF	(Italy)	Simone Pozzato	Club Milano	10 September 2024	
24 September 2024	MF	(Italy)	Mattia Vitale	FC Pompei		
3 February 2025	MF	(Switzerland)	Pajtim Kasami	Sion	11 February 2025	
30 June 2025	DF	(Poland)	Bartosz Bereszyński	Palermo	20 September 2025	

== Friendlies ==
20 July 2024	BFC Dynamo	1–0	Sampdoria	Berlin, Germany
17:30 CEST (UTC+2)	Dadashov 13'	Report		Stadium: Sportforum Hohenschönhausen; Referee: Jessen
Note: Match delayed by 30 minutes due to traffic delaying Sampdoria's arrival.

27 July 2024	1. FC Magdeburg	2–4	Sampdoria	Magdeburg, Germany
15:00 CEST (UTC+2)	Burcu 16'; Marušić 25'; Krempicki (yellow card) 29'; Michel (yellow card) 40'	Report	Coda 33'; Stoppa 68'; La Gumina 70', 71'	Stadium: Avnet Arena; Referee: Weisbach

30 July 2024	Carl Zeiss Jena	1–2	Sampdoria	Jena, Germany
20:00 CEST (UTC+2)	Richter 66'	Report	Coda 12'; Ferrari (yellow card) 35'; Venuti 45'	Stadium: Ernst-Abbe-Sportfeld; Referee: Bartnitzki

3 August 2024	Empoli	0–2	Sampdoria	Empoli
18:00 CEST (UTC+2)		Report	Coda 45'; Benedetti 78'	Stadium: Stadio Carlo Castellani; Referee: Aureliano

== Competitions ==
=== Overall record ===
Competition	First match	Last match	Starting round	Final position	Record							
Competition	First match	Last match	Starting round	Final position	Pld	W	D	L	GF	GA	GD	Win %
Serie B	18 August 2024	13 May 2025	Matchday 1	17th	38	8	17	13	38	49	−11	21.05
Relegation play-out	15 June 2025	22 June 2025	1st leg	Winners	2	2	0	0	5	0	+5	100.00
Coppa Italia	11 August 2024	18 December 2024	First Round	Round of 16	3	0	2	1	3	6	−3	0.00
Total					43	10	19	14	46	55	−9	23.26

Last updated: 22 June 2025
Source: Competitions

=== Serie B ===
==== League table ====
Pos	Team	Pld	W	D	L	GF	GA	GD	Pts	Promotion, qualification or relegation
15	Frosinone	38	9	16	13	37	50	−13	43	
16	Salernitana (R)	38	11	9	18	37	47	−10	42	Qualification for relegation play-out
17	Sampdoria (O)	38	8	17	13	38	49	−11	41	Qualification for relegation play-out
18	Brescia (R, E)	38	9	16	13	41	48	−7	39 (Note: Brescia were deducted 4 points due to administrative irregularities.)	Excluded and folded
19	Cittadella (R)	38	10	9	19	30	56	−26	39	Relegation to Serie C

Source: Serie BKT
Rules for classification: 1) Points; 2) Head-to-head points; 3) Head-to-head goal difference; 4) Goal difference; 5) Goals scored; 6) Draw.
(Note: Head-to-head record is used only after all the matches between the teams in question have been played)
(E) Eliminated; (O) Play-off winners; (R) Relegated

==== Results by round ====
Round	1	2	3	4	5	6	7	8	9	10	11	12	13	14	15	16	17	18	19	20	21	22	23	24	25	26	27	28	29	30	31	32	33	35	36	37	38	34
Ground	A	H	A	H	A	H	A	H	A	H	A	H	A	A	H	A	H	A	H	H	A	H	A	H	H	A	H	A	H	A	H	A	H	A	H	A	H	A
Result	D	L	L	D	L	W	W	L	W	W	D	L	L	D	D	L	D	D	D	L	D	L	D	W	W	L	D	D	D	D	L	L	W	L	D	D	W	D
Position	11	17	19	18	20	17	14	15	12	7	7	9	12	12	12	15	15	14	15	16	16	16	16	16	14	16	15	15	16	16	18	18	16	17	17	18	17	18

Source: See Results
A = Away; H = Home; W = Win; D = Draw; L = Loss; P = Abandoned

==== Results ====
18 August 2024 1	Frosinone	2–2	Sampdoria	Frosinone
20:30 CEST (UTC+2)	Monterisi (yellow card) 28'; Ambrosino 44'; Marchizza (yellow card) 62'; Distefano 80'	Report	Romagnoli (yellow card) 30'; Venuti 54'; Coda 67'; Vulikić (yellow card) 70'; Ioannou (red card) 82'	Stadium: Stadio Benito Stirpe; Attendance: 10,855; Referee: Rosario Abisso

24 August 2024 2	Sampdoria	0–1	Reggiana	Genoa
20:30 CEST (UTC+2)	Romagnoli (yellow card) 41'; Benedetti (yellow card) 82'	Report	Gondo (yellow card) 36'; Maggio (yellow card) 44'; Vido (yellow card) 84'; Vergara 84'; Cigarini (yellow card) 88'	Stadium: Stadio Luigi Ferraris; Attendance: 23,061; Referee: Francesco Cosso

27 August 2024 3	US Salernitana	3–2	Sampdoria	Salerno
20:30 CEST (UTC+2)	Simy 1'; Valencia 60'; Braaf 85'; Kallon (yellow card) 90+5' (yellow-red card) 90+5'	Report	Tutino 4'; Coda 21'; Bellemo (yellow card) 87'	Stadium: Stadio Arechi; Attendance: 15,683; Referee: Ermanno Feliciani

31 August 2024 4	Sampdoria	0–0	Bari	Genoa
18:00 CEST (UTC+2)	Vulikić (red card) 15'; Bellemo (yellow card) 39'; Ioannou (yellow card) 45+3'; Akinsanmiro (yellow card) 61'	Report	Benali (yellow card) 17'; Lasagna (penalty missed) 34'; Maiello (yellow card) 45'; Mantovani (yellow card) 54'; Falletti (yellow card) 65'	Stadium: Stadio Luigi Ferraris; Attendance: 23,233; Referee: Fabio Maresca

15 September 2024 5	Cosenza	2–1	Sampdoria	Cosenza
15:00 CEST (UTC+2)	Mazzocchi (yellow card) 6'; D'Orazio 8'; Strizzolo 51'; Camporese (yellow card) 80'; Kourfalidis (yellow card) 90+7'	Report	Vieira (yellow card) 23'; Ioannou 48'; Venuti (yellow card) 83'	Stadium: Stadio San Vito-Gigi Marulla; Attendance: 8,171; Referee: Giuseppe Collu

21 September 2024 6	Sampdoria	1–0	Südtirol	Genoa
15:00 CEST (UTC+2)	Venuti 20'; Bereszyński (yellow card) 30'; Tutino (yellow card) 49'; Depaoli (yellow card) 77'	Report	Kurtić (yellow card) 40'; Martini (yellow card) 72'	Stadium: Stadio Luigi Ferraris; Attendance: 21,440; Referee: Mario Perri

29 September 2024 7	Modena	1–3	Sampdoria	Modena
15:00 CEST (UTC+2)	Duca (yellow card) 40'; Pergreffi (yellow card) 60'; Beyuku 83'	Report	Yepes (yellow card) 9'; Benedetti (yellow card) 10'; Ioannou 57' (yellow card) 60'; Coda (yellow card) 67' (goal) 79'; Tutino 76'	Stadium: Stadio Alberto Braglia; Attendance: 10,101; Referee: Federico Dionisi

4 October 2024 8	Sampdoria	1–2	Juve Stabia	Genoa
20:30 CEST (UTC+2)	Bereszyński (yellow card) 30'; Coda 36'; Riccio (yellow card) 52'; Vulikić (yellow card) 83'	Report	Ruggero (yellow card) 14'; Folino (yellow card) 32'; Adorante 47', 49'; Fortini (yellow card) 71'; Meli (yellow card) 82'	Stadium: Stadio Luigi Ferraris; Attendance: 0 Referee: Luca Massimi

20 October 2024 9	Cesena	3–5	Sampdoria	Cesena
17:15 CEST (UTC+2)	Prestia 13'; Adamo 27'; Ciofi (yellow card) 45+1'; Kargbo 64' (yellow card) 90' (red card) 90+1' van Hooijdonk (yellow card) 90+3'	Report	Prestia 14' (o.g.); Meulensteen 22', 55'; Ioannou (yellow card) 53'; Tutino 61'; Venuti (yellow card) 78'; Akinsanmiro 88'	Stadium: Stadio Dino Manuzzi; Attendance: 12,000; Referee: Marco Piccinini

27 October 2024 10	Sampdoria	1–0	Mantova	Genoa
15:00 CET (UTC+1)	Venuti (yellow card) 18'; Kasami 61'; Riccio (yellow card) 90+1'	Report	Redolfi (yellow card) 8'; Burrai (yellow card) 58'; Bani (yellow card) 77'; Galuppini (yellow card) 88'	Stadium: Stadio Luigi Ferraris; Attendance: 22,629; Referee: Valerio Crezzini

30 October 2024 11	Cittadella	0–0	Sampdoria	Cittadella
20:30 CEST (UTC+2)	Rabbi (yellow card) 37'; Branca (yellow card) 39'; Magrassi (yellow card) 66'	Report	Riccio (yellow card) 76'	Stadium: Stadio Pier Cesare Tombolato; Attendance: 3,489; Referee: Alberto Santoro

3 November 2024 12	Sampdoria	0–1	Brescia	Genoa
17:15 CET (UTC+1)	Depaoli (yellow card) 17'; Riccio (yellow card) 45+1' (yellow-red card) 75'	Report	Olzer (yellow card) 18'; Dickmann (yellow card) 23'; Bjarnason 69'	Stadium: Stadio Luigi Ferraris; Attendance: 22,430; Referee: Alberto Ruben Arena

9 November 2024 13	Pisa	3–0	Sampdoria	Pisa
15:00 CET (UTC+1)	Canestrelli (yellow card) 34'; Lind 38'; Tramoni 52'; Angori 85'; Marin (yellow card) 87'	Report	Borini (yellow card) 76'; Bereszyński (yellow card) 87'	Stadium: Arena Garibaldi; Attendance: 8,745; Referee: Luca Pairetto

24 November 2024 14	Palermo	1–1	Sampdoria	Palermo
17:15 CET (UTC+1)	Di Francesco 45+3'	Report	Tutino 38'; Venuti (yellow card) 79'; Ferrari (yellow card) 90+2'	Stadium: Stadio Renzo Barbera; Attendance: 21,425; Referee: Daniele Doveri

30 November 2024 15	Sampdoria	3–3	Catanzaro	Genoa
15:00 CET (UTC+1)	Ioannou (yellow card) 34'; Sekulov 43'; Tutino 59' (pen.) (yellow card) 72'; Leonardi 90+1' (yellow card) 90+2'; Depaoli (yellow card) 90+6'	Report	Pompetti (yellow card) 45' (yellow-red card) 80'; Iemmello 54', 68' (pen.), 71'	Stadium: Stadio Luigi Ferraris; Attendance: 22,906; Referee: Paride Tremolada

8 December 2024 16	Sassuolo	5–1	Sampdoria	Reggio Emilia
17:15 CET (UTC+1)	Thorstvedt (yellow card) 9'; Laurienté 25'; Odenthal 45'; Pierini 64'; Berardi 74', 90'	Report	Ferrari (yellow card) 30'; Benedetti (yellow card) 60'; Coda 81' (pen.)	Stadium: Mapei Stadium; Attendance: 5,638; Referee: Maria Sole Ferrieri Caputi

14 December 2024 17	Sampdoria	0–0	Spezia	Genoa
17:15 CET (UTC+1)	Tutino (yellow card) 45+3'; Depaoli (yellow card) 71'; Kasami (yellow card) 90+4'	Report	Bandinelli (yellow card) 21'; Hristov (yellow card) 36'	Stadium: Stadio Luigi Ferraris; Attendance: 20,817; Referee: Gianluca Aureliano

22 December 2024 18	Cremonese	1–1	Sampdoria	Cremona
17:15 CET (UTC+1)	Vázquez 61'	Report	Bellemo 37' (yellow card) 59'; Benedetti (yellow card) 41'; Sekulov (yellow card) 90+3'	Stadium: Stadio Giovanni Zini; Attendance: 8,331; Referee: Maurizio Mariani

26 December 2024 19	Sampdoria	1–1	Carrarese	Genoa
20:30 CET (UTC+1)	Riccio (yellow card) 55'; Veroli 67'	Report	Finotto 4'; Illanes (red card) 52'; Schiavi (yellow card) 71'; Cherubini (yellow card) 90+5'	Stadium: Stadio Luigi Ferraris; Attendance: 22,431; Referee: Alessandro Prontera

29 December 2024 20	Sampdoria	0–1	Pisa	Genoa
17:15 CET (UTC+1)	Ioannou (yellow card) 82'; Vieira (yellow card) 90+3'	Report	Højholt (yellow card) 43'; Marin (yellow card) 52'; Bonfanti (yellow card) 55'; Tramoni 70'	Stadium: Stadio Luigi Ferraris; Attendance: 21,766; Referee: Juan Luca Sacchi

12 January 2025 21	Brescia	1–1	Sampdoria	Brescia
19:30 CET (UTC+1)	Lezzerini (yellow card) 34'; Jurić (yellow card) 43'; Moncini 51' (red card) 90+7'; Borrelli (yellow card) 89'	Report	Coda 33'; Akinsanmiro (yellow card) 35'; Tutino (yellow card) 40'; Meulensteen (yellow card) 45+1'; Bellemo (yellow card) 89'	Stadium: Stadio Mario Rigamonti; Attendance: 4,808; Referee: Davide Massa

17 January 2025 22	Sampdoria	1–2	Cesena	Genoa
20:30 CET (UTC+1)	Riccio 8'; Yepes (yellow card) 11'; Akinsanmiro (yellow card) 57'	Report	Tavşan (yellow card) 25'; Antonucci 31'; Donnarumma 62'; Klinsmann (yellow card) 88'; La Gumina (yellow card) 88'	Stadium: Stadio Luigi Ferraris; Attendance: 21,078; Referee: Giuseppe Collu

25 January 2025 23	Mantova	2–2	Sampdoria	Mantua
17:15 CET (UTC+1)	Burrai (yellow card) 47'; Mancuso 50'; Trimboli 53'	Report	Venuti (yellow card) 9'; Depaoli 22', 24'; Bellemo (yellow card) 45+1'; Curto (yellow card) 51'; Beruatto (yellow card) 66'	Stadium: Stadio Danilo Martelli; Attendance: 7,923; Referee: Gianluca Aureliano

1 February 2025 24	Sampdoria	1–0	Cosenza	Genoa
17:15 CET (UTC+1)	Vieira (yellow card) 26' (yellow-red card) 31'; Depaoli (yellow card) 40' (goal) 45'; Yepes (yellow card) 90+1'	Report	Florenzi (yellow card) 18'; Ricciardi (yellow card) 39'; Garritano (yellow card) 73'; D'Orazio (yellow card) 89'	Stadium: Stadio Luigi Ferraris; Attendance: 22,734; Referee: Marco Di Bello

8 February 2025 25	Sampdoria	1–0	Modena	Genoa
17:15 CET (UTC+1)	Niang 16'; Yepes (yellow card) 36'; Curto (yellow card) 83'; Sibilli (yellow card) 87'; Bellemo (yellow card) 90+2'	Report	Dellavalle (yellow card) 31'; Defrel (yellow card) 87'; Battistella (yellow card) 90'	Stadium: Stadio Luigi Ferraris; Attendance: 20,413; Referee: Federico Dionisi

15 February 2025 26	Südtirol	2–1	Sampdoria	Bolzano
15:00 CET (UTC+1)	Merkaj 6'; Giorgini (yellow card) 32'; Casiraghi (yellow card) 73' (goal) 88' (pen.); Molina (yellow card) 75'; Merkaj (yellow card) 90+6'	Report	Sibilli 11'; Niang (yellow card) 32'; Ferrari (yellow card) 41' (yellow-red card) 45+2'; Depaoli (yellow card) 57' (yellow-red card) 75'	Stadium: Stadio Druso; Attendance: 4,741; Referee: Marco Monaldi

21 February 2025 27	Sampdoria	0–0	Sassuolo	Genoa
20:30 CET (UTC+1)	Altare (yellow card) 3'; Riccio (yellow card) 15'; Curto (yellow card) 53'; Sibilli (yellow card) 64'; Meulensteen (yellow card) 67'	Report	Doig (yellow card) 44'; Berardi (yellow card) 66'; Lovato (yellow card) 73'	Stadium: Stadio Luigi Ferraris; Attendance: 21,395; Referee: Luca Pairetto

2 March 2025 28	Bari	1–1	Sampdoria	Bari
17:15 CET (UTC+1)	Pucino (yellow card) 18'; Maggiore 48'; Benali (yellow card) 55'	Report	Veroli (yellow card) 17'; Niang 45+2'; Bereszyński (yellow card) 62'; Oudin (yellow card) 80'	Stadium: Stadio San Nicola; Attendance: 18,526; Referee: Valerio Crezzini

8 March 2025 29	Sampdoria	1–1	Palermo	Genoa
17:15 CET (UTC+1)	Coda 1'; Depaoli (yellow card) 22'; Akinsanmiro (red card) 61'	Report	Pohjanpalo 40'; Pierozzi (yellow card) 75'	Stadium: Stadio Luigi Ferraris; Attendance: 25,323; Referee: Daniele Perenzoni

16 March 2025 30	Reggiana	2–2	Sampdoria	Reggio Emilia
15:00 CET (UTC+1)	Portanova 33'; Gondo (yellow card) 48' (goal) 60'; Marras (red card) 71' Vergara (yellow card) 85'	Report	Niang (yellow card) 54' (yellow-red card) 69' (goal) 67'; Cragno (yellow card) 61'; Sibilli (yellow card) 71'; Oudin 74'	Stadium: Mapei Stadium – Città del Tricolore; Attendance: 10,231; Referee: Livio Marinelli

29 March 2025 31	Sampdoria	0–3	Frosinone	Genoa
15:00 CEST (UTC+2)	Coda (penalty missed) 38'; Oudin (yellow card) 42'; Depaoli (yellow card) 67'	Report	Bohinen (yellow card) 12'; Cerofolini (yellow card) 37'; Kone 55'; Monterisi 70'; Ghedjemis 85'	Stadium: Stadio Luigi Ferraris; Attendance: 23,494; Referee: Federico Dionisi

6 April 2025 32	Spezia	2–0	Sampdoria	La Spezia
17:15 CEST (UTC+2)	Wiśniewski (yellow card) 37' (yellow-red card) 85'; Lapadula 65', 73'	Report	Vieira (yellow card) 28'; Sibilli (yellow card) 45'; Bereszyński (yellow card) 60'; Riccio (yellow card) 71'; Oudin (yellow card) 89'	Stadium: Stadio Alberto Picco; Attendance: 10,220; Referee: Antonio Rapuano

12 April 2025 33	Sampdoria	1–0	Cittadella	Genoa
17:15 CEST (UTC+2)	Sibilli (yellow card) 45' (goal) 64'; Depaoli (yellow card) 61'; Ricci (yellow card) 77'; Akinsanmiro (yellow card) 90+4'	Report	Palmieri (yellow card) 4'; Pandolfi (yellow card) 26'; Okwonkwo (yellow card) 41'	Stadium: Stadio Luigi Ferraris; Attendance: 26,940; Referee: Rosario Abisso

25 April 2025 35	Carrarese	1–0	Sampdoria	Carrara
15:00 CEST (UTC+2)	Torregrossa 7'; Schiavi (yellow card) 35'; Shpendi (yellow card) 47'	Report	Cragno (yellow card) 29'; Bereszyński (yellow card) 55'; Vieira (yellow card) 86'	Stadium: Stadio dei Marmi; Attendance: 4,194; Referee: Luca Zufferli

1 May 2025 36	Sampdoria	0–0	Cremonese	Genoa
15:00 CEST (UTC+2)	Beruatto (yellow card) 33'; Niang (yellow card) 59'	Report	Barbieri (yellow card) 38'	Stadium: Stadio Luigi Ferraris; Attendance: 26,214; Referee: Manuel Marchetti

4 May 2025 37	Catanzaro	2–2	Sampdoria	Catanzaro
15:00 CEST (UTC+2)	Quagliata (yellow card) 34'; Brighenti 45'; Iemmello (yellow card) 45+4'; Biasci 47'; Pompetti (yellow card) 60' (yellow-red card) 63'	Report	Depaoli 23'; Venuti (yellow card) 35'; Yepes (yellow card) 45+3'; Coda 50'	Stadium: Stadio Nicola Ceravolo; Attendance: 9,412; Referee: Giovanni Ayroldi

9 May 2025 38	Sampdoria	1–0	US Salernitana	Genoa
20:30 CEST (UTC+2)	Meulensteen 45+1' (yellow card) 73'; Cragno (yellow card) 80'; Benedetti (yellow card) 81'; Niang (yellow card) 90+6'	Report	Cerri (yellow card) 47'	Stadium: Stadio Luigi Ferraris; Attendance: 31,370; Referee: Antonio Rapuano

13 May 2025 34	Juve Stabia	0–0	Sampdoria	Castellammare di Stabia
20:30 CEST (UTC+2)	Pierobon (yellow card) 29'; Bellich (yellow card) 60'	Report	Niang (yellow card) 7'; Bereszyński (yellow card) 30'	Stadium: Stadio Romeo Menti; Attendance: 6,277; Referee: Andrea Colombo

==== Relegation play-out ====
15 June 2025 1st leg	Sampdoria	2–0	US Salernitana	Genoa
20:30 CEST (UTC+2)	Meulensteen 39'; Depaoli (yellow card) 40'; Yepes (yellow card) 45'; Venuti (yellow card) 77'; Curto 86'; Borini (red card) 90+2'; Veroli (yellow card) 90+8'; Ioannou (yellow card) 90+10'	Report	Ghiglione (yellow card) 51'; Tongya (yellow card) 57'; Simy (yellow card) 58'; Raimondo (yellow card) 90+6'; Stojanović (red card) 90+6'	Stadium: Stadio Luigi Ferraris; Attendance: 30,573; Referee: Gianluca Aureliano

22 June 2025 2nd leg	US Salernitana	0–3 (0–5 agg.)	Sampdoria	Salerno
20:30 CEST (UTC+2)		Report	Coda 38'; Sibilli 49'	Stadium: Stadio Arechi; Attendance: 22,000; Referee: Daniele Doveri
Note: Match abandoned on the 74th minute, whilst the score was 0-2 to Sampdoria, due to incidents caused by Salernitana fans. The match was later awarded as a walkover in favour of Sampdoria on 23 June.

=== Coppa Italia ===
11 August 2024 First Round	Sampdoria	1–1 (4–3 p)	Como	Genoa
20:45 CEST (UTC+2)	Ioannou 37'	Report	Cutrone 44'; Da Cunha (yellow card) 71'; Verdi (yellow card) 89'; Iovine (yellow card) 90+1' (yellow-red card) 90+7'	Stadium: Stadio Luigi Ferraris; Attendance: 14,196; Referee: Giuseppe Collu
	Penalties
	Vieira (penalty scored); Benedetti (penalty scored); Meulensteen (penalty missed); Coda (penalty scored); Tutino (penalty scored)		(penalty scored) Da Cunhav (penalty missed) Verdi; (penalty missed) Braunöder; (penalty scored) Baselli; (penalty scored) Strefezza

25 September 2024 Second Round	Genoa	1–1 (5–6 p)	Sampdoria	Genoa
21:00 CEST (UTC+2)	Pinamonti 9'; Badelj (yellow card) 36'; Vitinha (yellow card) 48'; Bani (yellow card) 56'; Vásquez (yellow card) 70'	Report	La Gumina (yellow card) 33'; Ioannou (yellow card) 36'; Depaoli (yellow card) 42'; Vieira (yellow card) 64'; Benedetti (yellow card) 71'; Meulensteen (yellow card) 82'; Borini 83' (red card) 90+2'	Stadium: Stadio Luigi Ferraris; Attendance: 28,575; Referee: Federico La Penna
	Penalties
	Miretti (penalty missed); Bani (penalty scored); Bohinen (penalty scored); Vásquez (penalty scored); Vogliacco (penalty scored); Frendrup (penalty scored); Zanoli (penalty missed)		(penalty scored) Borini; (penalty scored) Bereszyński; (penalty missed) Benedetti; (penalty scored) Depaoli; (penalty scored) Tutino; (penalty scored) Sekulov; (penalty scored) Barreca

18 December 2024 Round of 16	AS Roma	4–1	Sampdoria	Rome
21:00 CET (UTC+1)	Dovbyk 9', 19'; Pisilli (yellow card) 23'; Baldanzi 24'; Shomurodov 79'	Report	Vulikić (yellow card) 51'; Yepes 61'; Borini (yellow card) 67'	Stadium: Stadio Olimpico; Attendance: 56,858; Referee: Federico Dionisi

== Squad statistics ==
As of match played 15 June 2025

=== Appearances and goals ===
No.	Pos	Nat	Player	Total		Serie B		Relegation play-out		Coppa Italia	
No.	Pos	Nat	Player	Apps	Goals	Apps	Goals	Apps	Goals	Apps	Goals
2	DF	(Italy) ITA	Marco Curto	15	0	12+2	0	0+1	0	0	0
4	MF	(England) ENG	Ronaldo Vieira	22	0	10+8	0	1	0	2+1	0
5	DF	(Italy) ITA	Alessandro Pio Riccio	27	1	24+2	1	1	0	0	0
6	DF	(Italy) ITA	Simone Romagnoli	13	0	10+1	0	0	0	2	0
7	MF	(Italy) ITA	Alessandro Bellemo	24	1	16+6	1	0	0	1+1	0
8	MF	(Italy) ITA	Matteo Ricci	14	0	10+4	0	0	0	0	0
9	FW	(Italy) ITA	Massimo Coda	36	8	22+11	8	1	0	2	0
10	FW	(Italy) ITA	Gennaro Tutino	23	5	20+1	5	0	0	0+2	0
13	GK	(Italy) ITA	Samuele Perisan	1	0	1	0	0	0	0	0
15	MF	(Nigeria) NGR	Ebenezer Akinsanmiro	38	1	14+21	1	0	0	3	0
16	FW	(Italy) ITA	Fabio Borini	15	1	3+8	0	0+1	0	2+1	1
17	MF	(Netherlands) NED	Melle Meulensteen	29	4	23+2	3	1	1	2+1	0
18	DF	(Italy) ITA	Lorenzo Venuti	33	2	23+7	2	1	0	2	0
19	FW	(Senegal) SEN	M'Baye Niang	16	3	13+3	3	0	0	0	0
20	MF	(France) FRA	Rémi Oudin	13	1	9+4	1	0	0	0	0
21	GK	(Italy) ITA	Pietro Beruatto	16	0	12+4	0	0	0	0	0
22	GK	(Italy) ITA	Simone Ghidotti	11	0	9	0	0+1	0	1	0
23	DF	(Italy) ITA	Fabio Depaoli	36	4	24+9	4	1	0	1+1	0
24	DF	(Poland) POL	Bartosz Bereszyński	23	0	16+5	0	0	0	2	0
25	DF	(Italy) ITA	Alex Ferrari	10	0	7+2	0	1	0	0	0
26	DF	(Italy) ITA	Giorgio Altare	14	0	13+1	0	0	0	0	0
28	MF	(Spain) ESP	Gerard Yepes	28	1	20+5	0	1	0	2	1
33	FW	(Italy) ITA	Giuseppe Sibilli	14	2	12+1	2	1	0	0	0
44	DF	(Cyprus) CYP	Nikolas Ioannou	28	3	18+6	2	0+1	0	2+1	1
72	DF	(Italy) ITA	Davide Veroli	16	1	12+2	1	1	0	1	0
80	MF	(Italy) ITA	Leonardo Benedetti	29	0	13+12	0	0+1	0	0+3	0
84	FW	(Italy) ITA	Nikola Sekulov	18	1	3+13	1	0	0	0+2	0
90	FW	(Italy) ITA	Fabio Abiuso	9	0	0+9	0	0	0	0	0
94	GK	(Italy) ITA	Alessio Cragno	15	0	14	0	1	0	0	0
Players away on loan:
11	FW	(Spain) ESP	Estanis Pedrola	10	0	2+7	0	0	0	1	0
20	FW	(Italy) ITA	Antonino La Gumina	10	0	3+6	0	0	0	1	0
21	DF	(Italy) ITA	Simone Giordano	6	0	2+3	0	0	0	0+1	0
31	DF	(Croatia) CRO	Stipe Vulikić	14	0	8+3	0	0	0	3	0
34	FW	(Italy) ITA	Simone Leonardi	6	1	0+5	1	0	0	1	0
Players who appeared for Pafos but left during the season:
1	GK	(Italy) ITA	Paolo Vismara	11	0	7+3	0	0	0	1	0
3	DF	(Italy) ITA	Antonio Barreca	6	0	2+3	0	0	0	0+1	0
14	MF	(Switzerland) SUI	Pajtim Kasami	10	1	4+6	1	0	0	0	0
33	GK	(Italy) ITA	Marco Silvestri	8	0	7	0	0	0	1	0

=== Goal scorers ===
Place	Position	Nation	Number	Name	Serie B	Relegation play-out	Coppa Italia	Total
1	FW	(Italy)	9	Massimo Coda	8	0	0	8
2	FW	(Italy)	10	Gennaro Tutino	5	0	0	5
3	DF	(Italy)	23	Fabio Depaoli	4	0	0	4
3	MF	(Netherlands)	17	Melle Meulensteen	3	1	0	4
5	FW	(Senegal)	19	M'Baye Niang	3	0	0	3
5	DF	(Cyprus)	44	Nikolas Ioannou	2	0	1	3
7	FW	(Italy)	33	Giuseppe Sibilli	2	0	0	2
7	DF	(Italy)	18	Lorenzo Venuti	2	0	0	2
9	MF	(Nigeria)	15	Ebenezer Akinsanmiro	1	0	0	1
9	MF	(Switzerland)	14	Pajtim Kasami	1	0	0	1
9	FW	(Italy)	84	Nikola Sekulov	1	0	0	1
9	FW	(Italy)	34	Simone Leonardi	1	0	0	1
9	MF	(Italy)	7	Alessandro Bellemo	1	0	0	1
9	DF	(Italy)	72	Davide Veroli	1	0	0	1
9	DF	(Italy)	5	Alessandro Pio Riccio	1	0	0	1
9	MF	(France)	20	Rémi Oudin	1	0	0	1
9				Own goal	1	0	0	1
9	DF	(Italy)	2	Marco Curto	0	1	0	1
9	FW	(Italy)	16	Fabio Borini	0	0	1	1
9	MF	(Spain)	28	Gerard Yepes	0	0	1	1
				Awarded	3	0	0	3
Total					38	5	3	46

=== Clean sheets ===
Place	Position	Nation	Number	Name	Serie B	Relegation play-out	Coppa Italia	Total
1	GK	(Italy)	94	Alessio Cragno	6	1	0	7
2	GK	(Italy)	1	Paolo Vismara	3	0	0	3
3	GK	(Italy)	22	Simone Ghidotti	1	1	0	2
4	GK	(Italy)	33	Marco Silvestri	1	0	0	1
4	GK	(Italy)	13	Samuele Perisan	1	0	0	1
Total					12	1	0	13

Alessio Cragno & Simone Ghidotti both played in Sampdoria's 2-0 victory over US Salernitana on 15 June 2025

=== Disciplinary record ===
Number	Nation	Position	Name	Serie B		Relegation play-out		Coppa Italia		Total	
Number	Nation	Position	Name	Booked	Sent off (straight red)	Booked	Sent off (straight red)	Booked	Sent off (straight red)	Booked	Sent off (straight red)
2	(Italy)	DF	Marco Curto	3	0	0	0	0	0	3	0
4	(England)	MF	Ronaldo Vieira	6	1	0	0	1	0	7	1
5	(Italy)	DF	Alessandro Pio Riccio	8	1	0	0	0	0	8	1
6	(Italy)	DF	Simone Romagnoli	2	0	0	0	0	1	2	1
7	(Italy)	MF	Alessandro Bellemo	6	0	0	0	0	0	6	0
8	(Italy)	MF	Matteo Ricci	1	0	0	0	0	0	1	0
9	(Italy)	FW	Massimo Coda	1	0	0	0	0	0	1	0
10	(Italy)	FW	Gennaro Tutino	4	0	0	0	0	0	4	0
15	(Nigeria)	MF	Ebenezer Akinsanmiro	4	1	0	0	0	0	4	1
16	(Italy)	FW	Fabio Borini	1	0	0	1	1	0	2	1
17	(Netherlands)	MF	Melle Meulensteen	3	0	0	0	1	0	4	0
18	(Italy)	DF	Lorenzo Venuti	6	0	1	0	0	0	7	0
19	(Senegal)	FW	M'Baye Niang	6	1	0	0	0	0	6	1
20	(France)	MF	Rémi Oudin	3	0	0	0	0	0	3	0
21	(Italy)	DF	Pietro Beruatto	2	0	0	0	0	0	2	0
23	(Italy)	DF	Fabio Depaoli	9	1	1	0	1	0	11	1
24	(Poland)	DF	Bartosz Bereszyński	7	0	0	0	0	0	7	0
25	(Italy)	DF	Alex Ferrari	4	1	0	0	0	0	4	1
26	(Italy)	DF	Giorgio Altare	1	0	0	0	0	0	1	0
28	(Spain)	MF	Gerard Yepes	5	0	1	0	0	0	6	0
33	(Italy)	FW	Giuseppe Sibilli	5	0	0	0	0	0	5	0
44	(Cyprus)	DF	Nikolas Ioannou	5	1	1	0	1	0	7	1
72	(Italy)	DF	Davide Veroli	1	0	1	0	0	0	2	0
80	(Italy)	MF	Leonardo Benedetti	5	0	0	0	1	0	6	0
84	(Italy)	FW	Nikola Sekulov	1	0	0	0	0	0	1	0
94	(Italy)	GK	Alessio Cragno	3	0	0	0	0	0	3	0
Players away on loan:
20	(Italy)	FW	Antonino La Gumina	0	0	0	0	1	0	1	0
31	(Croatia)	DF	Stipe Vulikić	2	1	0	0	1	0	3	1
34	(Italy)	FW	Simone Leonardi	1	0	0	0	0	0	1	0
Players who left Sampdoria during the season:
14	(Switzerland)	MF	Pajtim Kasami	1	0	0	0	0	0	1	0
Total				106	8	5	1	8	1	119	10
