= 2026–27 UC Sampdoria season =

UC Sampdoria
2026–27 season
- Manager: Bernardo Corradi (until 19 October); Luca D'Angelo (from 22 October)
- Stadium: Stadio Luigi Ferraris
- Serie B: 19th
- Coppa Italia: First Round vs Cremonese
- Top goalscorer: League: Lorenzo Insigne (2); All: Lorenzo Insigne (2)
Home colours	Away colours

The 2026–27 season is UC Sampdoria's 81st season in existence and the club's fourth season in Serie B, the second division of Italian football. In addition to the domestic league, UC Sampdoria will participate in this season's edition of the Coppa Italia. The season covers the period from 1 July 2026 to 30 June 2027.

== Season review ==
=== Preseason ===
On 16 June, Sampdoria announced that they had exercised an option in their loan deal with Parma for Tjaš Begić, to make the transfer permanent, with Begić signing a contract until 30 June 2030.

On 25 June, Sampdoria announced the appointment of Bernardo Corradi as their new First Team Coach.

=== July ===
On 1 July, Sampdoria announced the signing of Stefan Gartenmann from Ferencváros on a contract until 30 June 2028.

On 3 July, Víctor Narro joined Hércules on loan for the season, with an option and obligation to buy on condition to make the transfer permanent.

On 8 July, Sampdoria announced the signing of Lorenzo Insigne from Pescara on a contract until 30 June 2027, with an option to extend until 30 June 2028.

On 10 July, Sampdoria announced that Gaëtan Coucke had been sold to Cercle Brugge. Also on10 July, Sampdoria announced the signing of Danel Sinani from St. Pauli on a contract until 30 June 2028.

On 18 July, Sampdoria announced the signing of Tobias Lauritsen from Sparta Rotterdam on a contract until 30 June 2029.

On 21 July, Sampdoria announced that they had signed their first professional contract with Tommaso Casalino, until 30 June 2029, and that the midfielder had joined US Pianese on loan.

On 31 July, Sampdoria announced the permanent signing of Mattia Viti from Nice on a contract until 30 June 2030.

=== August ===
On 1 August, Sampdoria announced that Lorenzo Malanca had joined Vado on loan.

On 3 August, Sampdoria announced that Estanis Pedrola had been sold to Real Oviedo for an undisclosed fee.

On 5 August, Sampdoria announced that academy player Andrey Krastev had signed a contract with the club until 30 June 2030.

On 6 August, Stefano Girelli left Sampdoria permanently, to sign for Casertana.

On 11 August, Sampdoria announced the season-long loan signing of Peter Vindahl from Sparta Prague.

On 12 August, Sampdoria announced the permanent signing of Bjorn Meijer from Club Brugge on a contract until 30 June 2030, and the signing of free-agent Yari Verschaeren, who'd last played for Anderlecht, on a contract until 30 June 2029.

On 24 August, Sampdoria announced that they had agreed to the mutual termination of their contracts with Nicholas Scardigno and Antonino La Gumina.

On 27 August, Sampdoria announced the season-long loan signing of Antoine Makoumbou from Samsunspor with an option to make the move permanent.

On 31 August, Sampdoria announced the signing of Kevin Mbabu on a contract until 30 June 2028.

=== September ===
On 1 September, Sampdoria announced the return to the club of Samuele Massolo from Vicenza on a contract until 30 June 2029, and the year-long loan deal of Filippo Delli Carri from Monza with an option to make the move permanent. Additionally Sampdoria announced that Simone Ghidotti had left the club permanently to sign for Parma, that Alessandro Bellemo had also left permanently to join Vicenza, Lorenzo Paratici had joined AS Roma on a season-long loan deal with an option to make the move permanent, and that Jordan Ferri had left the club after his contract was terminated by mutual agreement.

On 2 September, Sampdoria announced that Giuseppe Forte had joined Fiorentina on loan with an option to make the move permanent.

On 6 September, Sampdoria announced the signing of free-agent Yann Karamoh on a contract until 30 June 2027, with an option to extended the contract until 30 June 2028.

On 9 September, Sampdoria announced that Alessandro Pio Riccio had left the club to sign permanently for Pogoń Szczecin.

=== October ===
On 19 October, Sampdoria announced that Bernardo Corradi had been relieved of his duties as first-team coach.

On 22 October, Sampdoria announced Luca D'Angelo as their new head coach.

== Squad ==
As of match played 8 November 2026

No.	Name	Nationality	Position	Date of birth (age)	Signed from	Signed in	Contract ends	Apps.	Goals
Goalkeepers
1	Peter Vindahl	(Denmark)	GK	16 February 1998 (age 28)	on loan from Sparta Prague	2026	2027	8	0
12	Andrey Krastev	(Bulgaria)	GK	4 August 2008 (age 18)	Academy	2026	2030	4	0
96	Samuele Massolo	(Italy)	GK	4 May 1996 (age 30)	Vicenza	2026	2029	0	0
Defenders
2	Mattia Viti	(Italy)	DF	24 January 2002 (age 24)	Nice	2026	2030	19	0
3	Stefan Gartenmann	(Switzerland)	DF	2 February 1997 (age 29)	Ferencváros	2026	2028	11	0
5	Bjorn Meijer	(Netherlands)	DF	18 March 2003 (age 23)	Club Brugge	2026	2030	2	0
13	Luca Ravanelli	(Italy)	DF	6 January 1997 (age 29)	Monza	2026		3	0
15	Filippo Delli Carri	(Italy)	DF	3 May 1999 (age 27)	on loan from Monza	2026	2027	9	0
23	Fabio Depaoli	(Italy)	DF	24 April 1997 (age 29)	ChievoVerona	2019		144	11
25	Alex Ferrari	(Italy)	DF	1 July 1994 (age 32)	Bologna	2019		103	1
29	Alessandro Di Pardo	(Italy)	DF	18 July 1999 (age 27)	Cagliari	2026	2029	26	1
38	Karim Diop	(Italy)	DF	21 July 2009 (age 17)	Academy	2026		1	0
40	Federico Piermattei	(Italy)	DF	15 February 2008 (age 18)	Academy	2026		0	0
41	Noà Mondani	(Italy)	DF	5 February 2009 (age 17)	Academy	2026		0	0
43	Kevin Mbabu	(Switzerland)	DF	19 April 1995 (age 31)	Unattached	2026	2028	5	0
Midfielders
6	Liam Henderson	(Scotland)	MF	25 April 1996 (age 30)	Empoli	2025	2027(+1)	43	5
7	Manuel Cicconi	(Italy)	MF	27 June 1997 (age 29)	Carrarese	2026	2029	27	0
16	Yari Verschaeren	(Belgium)	MF	12 July 2001 (age 25)	Unattached	2026	2029	10	1
18	Nikola Sekulov	(Italy)	MF	18 February 2002 (age 24)	Juventus	2025	2028	19	1
20	Danel Sinani	(Luxembourg)	MF	5 April 1997 (age 29)	St. Pauli	2026	2028	6	0
28	Oliver Abildgaard	(Denmark)	MF	10 June 1996 (age 30)	Como	2025	2028	37	1
33	Francesco Conti	(Italy)	MF	23 October 2004 (age 22)	Academy	2024	2030	29	2
35	Leo Rodella	(Italy)	MF	23 September 2008 (age 18)	Academy	2026		0	0
37	Stefan Amarandei	(Romania)	MF	31 May 2008 (age 18)	Academy	2026		0	0
45	Antoine Makoumbou	(Republic of the Congo)	MF	18 July 1998 (age 28)	on loan from Samsunspor	2026	2027	10	0
94	Salvatore Esposito	(Italy)	MF	7 October 2000 (age 26)	Spezia	2026	2030	15	0
Forwards
9	Tobias Lauritsen	(Norway)	FW	30 August 1997 (age 29)	Sparta Rotterdam	2026	2029	7	0
10	Lorenzo Insigne	(Italy)	FW	4 June 1991 (age 35)	Pescara	2026	2027 (+1)	5	3
11	Tjaš Begić	(Slovenia)	FW	30 June 2003 (age 23)	Parma	2026	2030	30	4
14	Yann Karamoh	(France)	FW	8 July 1998 (age 28)	Unattached	2026	2027 (+1)	7	0
39	Lorenzo Mezzotero	(Azerbaijan)	FW	16 August 2008 (age 18)	Academy	2026		4	1
99	Gennaro Tutino	(Italy)	FW	20 August 1996 (age 30)	Cosenza	2025	2028	36	7
Out on loan
17	Lorenzo Paratici	(Italy)	FW	21 July 2008 (age 18)	Academy	2025	2028	1	0
21	Giuseppe Forte	(Italy)	FW	21 October 2008 (age 18)	Academy	2025	2028	1	0
34	Tommaso Casalino	(Italy)	MF	31 July 2007 (age 19)	Academy	2025	2029	4	0
39	Lorenzo Malanca	(Italy)	DF	2 January 2007 (age 19)	Academy	2025	2028	0	0
	Víctor Narro	(Spain)	FW	27 May 1999 (age 27)	Gimnàstic	2025	2028	5	0
Left during the season
4	Alessandro Pio Riccio	(Italy)	DF	6 February 2002 (age 24)	Juventus	2025	2027	45	1
14	Alessandro Bellemo	(Italy)	MF	7 August 1995 (age 31)	Como	2025	2027	37	1
22	Elia Tantalocchi	(Italy)	GK	30 June 2004 (age 22)	Academy	2021			
30	Nicholas Scardigno	(Italy)	GK	24 January 2006 (age 20)	Academy	2025		0	0
31	Simone Ghidotti	(Italy)	GK	19 March 2000 (age 26)	Como	2025	2027	32	0
98	Gaëtan Coucke	(Belgium)	GK	3 November 1998 (age 28)	Al-Orobah	2025	2027	2	0
	Jordan Ferri	(France)	MF	12 March 1992 (age 34)	Montpellier	2025	2027(+1)	6	0
	Stefano Girelli	(Italy)	MF	9 January 2001 (age 25)	Cremonese	2023		18	0
	Antonino La Gumina	(Italy)	FW	6 March 1996 (age 30)	Empoli	2021	2027	40	3
	Estanis Pedrola	(Spain)	FW	24 August 2003 (age 23)	Barcelona	2024	2027	34	3

== Transfers ==
=== In ===
Date	Position	Nationality	Name	From	Fee	Ref.
16 June 2026 (Note: Transfer announced on the shown date, becoming official on 1 July 2026.)	MF	(Slovenia)	Tjaš Begić	Parma	Undisclosed	
1 July 2026	DF	(Switzerland)	Stefan Gartenmann	Ferencváros	Undisclosed	
8 July 2026	FW	(Italy)	Lorenzo Insigne	Pescara	Undisclosed	
10 July 2026	MF	(Luxembourg)	Danel Sinani	St. Pauli	Undisclosed	
18 July 2026	FW	(Norway)	Tobias Lauritsen	Sparta Rotterdam	Undisclosed	
31 July 2026	FW	(Italy)	Mattia Viti	Nice	Undisclosed	
12 August 2026	DF	(Netherlands)	Bjorn Meijer	Club Brugge	Undisclosed	
12 August 2026	MF	(Belgium)	Yari Verschaeren	Unattached	Free	
31 August 2026	DF	(Switzerland)	Kevin Mbabu	Unattached	Free	
1 September 2026	GK	(Italy)	Samuele Massolo	Vicenza	Undisclosed	
6 September 2026	FW	(France)	Yann Karamoh	Unattached	Free	

=== Loans in ===
Start date	Position	Nationality	Name	From	End date	Ref.
11 August 2026	GK	(Denmark)	Peter Vindahl	Sparta Prague	30 June 2027	
27 August 2026	MF	(Republic of the Congo)	Antoine Makoumbou	Samsunspor	30 June 2027	
1 September 2026	DF	(Italy)	Filippo Delli Carri	Monza	30 June 2027	

=== Out ===
Date	Position	Nationality	Name	To	Fee	Ref.
1 July 2026	DF	(Romania)	Andrei Coubiș	Universitatea Cluj	Undisclosed	
10 July 2026	GK	(Belgium)	Gaëtan Coucke	Cercle Brugge	Undisclosed	
3 August 2026	FW	(Spain)	Estanis Pedrola	Real Oviedo	Undisclosed	
6 August 2026	MF	(Italy)	Stefano Girelli	Casertana	Undisclosed	
28 August 2026	GK	(Italy)	Elia Tantalocchi	LR Vicenza	Undisclosed	
1 September 2026	GK	(Italy)	Simone Ghidotti	Parma	Undisclosed	
1 September 2026	MF	(Italy)	Alessandro Bellemo	LR Vicenza	Undisclosed	
9 September 2026	DF	(Italy)	Alessandro Pio Riccio	Pogoń Szczecin	Undisclosed	

=== Loans out ===
Start date	Position	Nationality	Name	To	End date	Ref.
3 July 2026	FW	(Spain)	Víctor Narro	Hércules	30 June 2027	
21 July 2026	MF	(Italy)	Tommaso Casalino	US Pianese	30 June 2027	
1 August 2026	DF	(Italy)	Lorenzo Malanca	Vado	30 June 2027	
1 September 2026	FW	(Italy)	Lorenzo Paratici	AS Roma	30 June 2027	
2 September 2026	FW	(Italy)	Giuseppe Forte	Fiorentina	30 June 2027	

=== Released ===
Date	Position	Nationality	Name	Joined	Date	Ref
24 August 2026	GK	(Italy)	Nicholas Scardigno	Licata		
24 August 2026	FW	(Italy)	Antonino La Gumina	Salernitana	25 August 2026	
1 September 2026	MF	(France)	Jordan Ferri			

== Friendlies ==
18 July 2026	Sampdoria	2–0	AC Taverne	Ponte di Legno
17:00 CEST (UTC+2)	Tutino 35', 40' (pen.)	Report		Referee: Tagliaferri

23 July 2026	Sampdoria	0–0	Cagliari	Ponte di Legno
17:00 CEST (UTC+2)		Report		Referee: Tremolada

1 August 2026	Sampdoria	1–2	Novara	Bogliasco
17:00 CEST (UTC+2)	Lauritsen 6'	Report	Moretti 12'; Alberti 21'	Stadium: Mugnaini stadium Attendance: 0
Note: Match played behind closed doors.

9 August 2026	Parma	0–2	Sampdoria	Parma
20:00 CEST (UTC+2)		Report	Abildgaard 5'; Lauritsen 13'	Stadium: Stadio Ennio Tardini; Attendance: 4,677; Referee: Gianquinto of Parma

== Competitions ==
=== Overall record ===
Competition	First match	Last match	Starting round	Final position	Record							
Competition	First match	Last match	Starting round	Final position	Pld	W	D	L	GF	GA	GD	Win %
Serie B	23 August 2026	2027	Matchday 1		11	3	2	6	11	18	−7	27.27
Coppa Italia	17 August 2026	17 August 2026	First Round	First Round	1	0	0	1	0	2	−2	0.00
Total					12	3	2	7	11	20	−9	25.00

Last updated: 8 November 2026
Source: Competitions

=== Serie B ===
==== League table ====
Pos	Team	Pld	W	D	L	GF	GA	GD	Pts	Qualification or relegation
12	Cesena	11	3	6	2	12	14	−2	15	
13	Juve Stabia	11	4	4	3	12	11	+1	12 (Note: Juve Stabia were deducted 2 points for administrative and financial irregularities and a further 2 points for tax payment irregularities.)	
14	Sampdoria	11	3	2	6	11	18	−7	11	
15	Arezzo	11	3	2	6	9	20	−11	11	
16	Virtus Entella	11	2	4	5	11	14	−3	10	Qualification for the relegation play-out

Updated to match(es) played on 8 November 2026. Source: Serie B
Rules for classification: 1) Points; 2) Head-to-head points; 3) Head-to-head goal difference; 4) Goal difference; 5) Goals scored; 6) Draw.

==== Results summary ====
Overall								Home						Away					
Pld	W	D	L	GF	GA	GD	Pts	W	D	L	GF	GA	GD	W	D	L	GF	GA	GD
11	3	2	6	11	17	−6	11	2	0	2	6	5	+1	1	2	4	5	12	−7

Last updated: 8 November 2026.
Source: Results

==== Results by round ====
Matchday	1	2	3	4	5	6	7	8	9	10	11
Ground	A	H	A	A	H	A	H	A	A	H	A
Result	D	L	L	L	W	L	L	D	L	W	W
Position	11	15	18	20	17	19	20	19	19	19	14

Updated to match(es) played on 8 November 2026. Source: Results
A = Away; H = Home; W = Win; D = Draw; L = Loss; P = Postponed
Notes:
- ^{1}

==== Results ====
23 August 2026 1	Cesena	1–1	Sampdoria	Cesena
21:00 CEST (UTC+2)	Shpendi 17' (yellow card) 57'; David (yellow card) 43' (yellow-red card) 50'	Report	Cicconi (yellow card) 38'; Henderson 83'	Stadium: Stadio Dino Manuzzi; Referee: Juan Luca Sacchi

29 August 2026 2	Sampdoria	1–2	Juve Stabia	Genoa
19:00 CEST (UTC+2)	Cicconi (yellow card) 13'; Tutino 45+3'; Makoumbou (yellow card) 49'	Report	Bettella (yellow card) 22'; Buglio (yellow card) 49'; Bellich 73'; Di Nardo 82'	Stadium: Stadio Luigi Ferraris; Referee: Giuseppe Mucera

7 September 2026 3	Palermo	3–1	Sampdoria	Palermo
19:30 CEST (UTC+2)	Strefezza 9'; Pohjanpalo 33'; Bani (yellow card) 47'; Palumbo (yellow card) 90+2' (goal) 90+4'	Report	Henderson (yellow card) 18'; Insigne (yellow card) 18' (goal) 63'; Cicconi (yellow card) 90+6'	Stadium: Stadio Renzo Barbera; Referee: Matteo Marchetti

13 September 2026 4	Mantova	2–0	Sampdoria	Mantua
17:15 CEST (UTC+2)	Benaïssa-Yahia (yellow card) 16'; Ruocco 58'; Longonda 66'	Report	Insigne (yellow card) 28'; Henderson (yellow card) 44'; Lauritsen 64' (o.g.)	Stadium: Stadio Danilo Martelli; Referee: Daniele Chiffi

19 September 2026 5	Sampdoria	2–1	Catanzaro	Genoa
17:15 CEST (UTC+2)	Henderson (yellow card) 17'; Gartenmann (yellow card) 38'; Insigne 56'; Abildgaard (red card) 64'; Begić 85'; Mbabu (yellow card) 90+5'	Report	Iemmello (yellow card) 17'; Gartenmann 45+2' (o.g.); Koffi (yellow card) 66'; Giovane (yellow card) 75'; Antonini (yellow card) 90+6'	Stadium: Stadio Luigi Ferraris; Referee: Giovanni Ayroldi

9 October 2026 6	Avellino	4–1	Sampdoria	Avellino
20:30 CEST (UTC+2)	Cheddira 12'; Palumbo 20'; Russo 24'; Besaggio 29' (yellow card) 90+3'; Venturi (yellow card) 71'; Favilli (yellow card) 81'; Izzo (yellow card) 90+1'	Report	Insigne 18'; Ferrari (yellow card) 77'	Stadium: Stadio Partenio-Adriano Lombardi; Referee: Juan Luca Sacchi

18 October 2026 7	Sampdoria	1–2	Arezzo	Genoa
19:30 CEST (UTC+2)	Henderson (yellow card) 2' (goal) 9'; Delli Carri (yellow card) 89'	Report	Chierico (yellow card) 12' (goal) 60'; Arena 15'; Mawuli (yellow card) 66'	Stadium: Stadio Luigi Ferraris; Referee: Andrea Colombo

24 October 2026 8	Südtirol	1–1	Sampdoria	Bolzano
14:00 CEST (UTC+2)	Stabile (yellow card) 61'; Molina 90+6' (pen.)	Report	Cicconi (yellow card) 18'; Verschaeren 34'; Gartenmann (yellow card) 68'	Stadium: Stadio Druso; Referee: Valerio Crezzini

27 October 2026 9	Ascoli	2–0	Sampdoria	Ascoli Piceno
19:00 CET (UTC+1)	Silipo 55'; Abildgaard 82' (o.g.); Guiebre (yellow card) 89'	Report	Delli Carri (yellow card) 53'; Begić (yellow card) 89'	Stadium: Stadio Cino e Lillo Del Duca; Referee: Marco Di Bello

31 October 2026 10	Sampdoria	2–0	Virtus Entella	Genoa
19:30 CET (UTC+1)	Tiritiello 23' (o.g.); Cicconi (yellow card) 32'; Mezzotero 42'; Mbabu (yellow card) 90+2'	Report	Mezzoni (yellow card) 19'; Vignali (yellow card) 31'; Guiu (yellow card) 33'; Marconi (yellow card) 45+2'	Stadium: Stadio Luigi Ferraris; Referee: Andrea Calzavara

8 November 2026 11	Carrarese	0–1	Sampdoria	Carrara
17:15 CET (UTC+1)	Rubino (yellow card) 36'	Report	Tutino (yellow card) 19' (goal) 23'; Mezzotero (yellow card) 41'; Begić (yellow card) 52'; Karamoh (yellow card) 85'	Stadium: Stadio dei Marmi; Referee: Davide Di Marco

21 November 2026 12	Sampdoria	–	Benevento	Genoa
19:00 CET (UTC+1)				Stadium: Stadio Luigi Ferraris

=== Coppa Italia ===
17 August 2026 First Round	Cremonese	2–0	Sampdoria	Bolzano
20:45 CEST (UTC+2)	Stückler 23'; Vandeputte (yellow card) 52'; Gerli (yellow card) 69'; Pezzella (yellow card) 71'; Berti 90+3'	Report	Henderson (yellow card) 71'	Stadium: Stadio Druso; Attendance: 1,048; Referee: Daniele Perenzoni
Note: Match played at the Stadio Druso in Bolzano, instead of Cremonese' regular Stadio Giovanni Zini in Cremona.

== Squad statistics ==
As of match played 8 November 2026

=== Appearances and goals ===
No.	Pos	Nat	Player	Total		Serie B		Coppa Italia	
No.	Pos	Nat	Player	Apps	Goals	Apps	Goals	Apps	Goals
1	GK	(Denmark) DEN	Peter Vindahl	8	0	7	0	1	0
2	DF	(Italy) ITA	Mattia Viti	3	0	2	0	1	0
3	DF	(Switzerland) SUI	Stefan Gartenmann	11	0	8+2	0	1	0
5	DF	(Netherlands) NED	Bjorn Meijer	2	0	0+1	0	0+1	0
6	MF	(Scotland) SCO	Liam Henderson	12	2	11	2	1	0
7	MF	(Italy) ITA	Manuel Cicconi	11	0	9+1	0	1	0
9	FW	(Norway) NOR	Tobias Lauritsen	7	0	5+1	0	1	0
10	FW	(Italy) ITA	Lorenzo Insigne	5	3	4+1	3	0	0
11	FW	(Slovenia) SLO	Tjaš Begić	11	1	6+5	1	0	0
12	GK	(Bulgaria) BUL	Andrey Krastev	4	0	4	0	0	0
13	DF	(Italy) ITA	Luca Ravanelli	3	0	2+1	0	0	0
14	FW	(France) FRA	Yann Karamoh	7	0	1+6	0	0	0
15	DF	(Italy) ITA	Filippo Delli Carri	9	0	9	0	0	0
16	MF	(Belgium) BEL	Yari Verschaeren	10	1	8+2	1	0	0
20	MF	(Luxembourg) LUX	Danel Sinani	6	0	3+2	0	1	0
23	DF	(Italy) ITA	Fabio Depaoli	5	0	3+2	0	0	0
25	DF	(Italy) ITA	Alex Ferrari	5	0	2+2	0	0+1	0
28	MF	(Denmark) DEN	Oliver Abildgaard	8	0	6+2	0	0	0
29	DF	(Italy) ITA	Alessandro Di Pardo	10	0	9	0	1	0
33	MF	(Italy) ITA	Francesco Conti	1	0	0+1	0	0	0
38	DF	(Italy) ITA	Karim Diop	1	0	0+1	0	0	0
39	FW	(Azerbaijan) AZE	Lorenzo Mezzotero	4	1	1+3	1	0	0
43	DF	(Switzerland) SUI	Kevin Mbabu	5	0	2+3	0	0	0
45	MF	(Republic of the Congo) CGO	Antoine Makoumbou	10	0	10	0	0	0
94	MF	(Italy) ITA	Salvatore Esposito	4	0	2+1	0	1	0
99	FW	(Italy) ITA	Gennaro Tutino	12	2	6+5	2	0+1	0
Players away on loan:
17	FW	(Italy) ITA	Lorenzo Paratici	1	0	0	0	0+1	0
21	FW	(Italy) ITA	Giuseppe Forte	1	0	0	0	1	0
Players who appeared for Sampdoria but left during the season:
14	MF	(Italy) ITA	Alessandro Bellemo	2	0	1	0	1	0

=== Goal scorers ===
Place	Position	Nation	Number	Name	Serie B	Coppa Italia	Total
1	FW	(Italy)	10	Lorenzo Insigne	3	0	3
2	MF	(Scotland)	6	Liam Henderson	2	0	2
2	FW	(Italy)	99	Gennaro Tutino	2	0	2
4	FW	(Slovenia)	11	Tjaš Begić	1	0	1
4	MF	(Belgium)	16	Yari Verschaeren	1	0	1
4	FW	(Azerbaijan)	39	Lorenzo Mezzotero	1	0	1
4				Own goal	1	0	1
Total					11	0	11

=== Clean sheets ===
Place	Position	Nation	Number	Name	Serie B	Coppa Italia	Total
1	GK	(Bulgaria)	12	Andrey Krastev	2	0	2
Total					2	0	2

=== Disciplinary record ===
Number	Nation	Position	Name	Serie B		Coppa Italia		Total	
Number	Nation	Position	Name	Yellow card	Red card	Yellow card	Red card	Yellow card	Red card
3	(Switzerland)	DF	Stefan Gartenmann	2	0	0	0	2	0
6	(Scotland)	MF	Liam Henderson	4	0	1	0	5	0
7	(Italy)	MF	Manuel Cicconi	5	0	0	0	5	0
10	(Italy)	FW	Lorenzo Insigne	2	0	0	0	2	0
11	(Slovenia)	FW	Tjaš Begić	2	0	0	0	2	0
14	(France)	FW	Yann Karamoh	1	0	0	0	1	0
15	(Italy)	DF	Filippo Delli Carri	2	0	0	0	2	0
25	(Italy)	DF	Alex Ferrari	1	0	0	0	1	0
28	(Denmark)	MF	Oliver Abildgaard	0	1	0	0	0	1
39	(Azerbaijan)	FW	Lorenzo Mezzotero	1	0	0	0	1	0
43	(Switzerland)	DF	Kevin Mbabu	2	0	0	0	2	0
45	(Republic of the Congo)	MF	Antoine Makoumbou	1	0	0	0	1	0
99	(Italy)	FW	Gennaro Tutino	1	0	0	0	1	0
Players away on loan:
Players who left Sampdoria during the season:
Total				24	1	1	0	25	1
