= 2024–25 Coppa Italia =

Tournament details
- Country: Italy
- Dates: 3 August 2024 – 14 May 2025
- Teams: 44

Final positions
- Champions: Bologna (3rd title)
- Runners-up: AC Milan

Tournament statistics
- Matches played: 45
- Goals scored: 137 (3.04 per match)
- Top goal scorer: Tammy Abraham (4 goals)

The 2024–25 Coppa Italia (branded as the Coppa Italia Frecciarossa for sponsorship reasons) was the 78th edition of the national domestic tournament. There were 44 participating teams.

Juventus were the defending champions, having won a record fifteenth title in the previous edition, but were eliminated by Empoli in the quarter-finals. Bologna won its third Coppa Italia by defeating AC Milan 1–0 in the final, winning a first national title in 51 years.

== Participating teams ==
Serie A The 20 clubs of the 2024–25 season	Serie B The 20 clubs of the 2024–25 season	Serie C Four clubs of the 2024–25 season
Atalanta; Bologna; Cagliari; Como; Empoli; Fiorentina; Genoa; Hellas Verona; Inter; Juventus; Lazio; Lecce; Milan; Monza; Napoli; Parma; Roma; Torino; Udinese; Venezia	Bari; Brescia; Carrarese; Catanzaro; Cesena; Cittadella; Cosenza; Cremonese; Frosinone; Juve Stabia; Mantova; Modena; Palermo; Pisa; Reggiana; Salernitana; Sampdoria; Sassuolo; Spezia; Südtirol	Avellino; Catania; Padova; Torres

== Format and seeding ==
Beginning with this edition of the Coppa Italia, extra time is only possible in the semi-finals and final. In all other rounds, matches drawn after 90 minutes will proceed immediately to a penalty shoot-out to determine which team will advance to the next round.

Teams entered the competition at various stages, as follows:

- First phase (one-legged fixtures)
  - Preliminary round: the four teams from Serie C and four Serie B teams started the tournament
  - First round: the four winners were joined by the remaining 16 Serie B teams, and 12 teams from Serie A
  - Second round: the 16 winners faced each other
- Second phase
  - Round of 16 (one-legged): the eight winners were joined by Serie A clubs, seeded 1–8
  - Quarter-finals (one-legged): the eight winners faced each other
  - Semi-finals (two-legged): the four winners faced each other
  - Final (one-legged): the two winners faced each other

== Round dates ==
Phase	Round	Clubs remaining	Clubs involved	From previous round	Entries in this round	First leg	Second leg
First stage	Preliminary round	44	8	none	8	3–4 August 2024	
First stage	First round	40	32	4	28	9–12 August 2024	
First stage	Second round	24	16	16	none	24–26 September 2024	
Second stage	Round of 16	16	16	8	8	3–19 December 2024	
Second stage	Quarter-finals	8	8	8	none	5–26 February 2025	
Second stage	Semi-finals	4	4	4	none	1–2 April 2025	23–24 April 2025
Second stage	Final	2	2	2	none	14 May 2025	

== First stage ==
=== Preliminary round ===
A total of eight teams from Serie B and Serie C competed in this round, four of which advanced to the first round.

3 August 2024	Carrarese (2)	2–1	Catania (3)	Chiavari
18:00 CEST	Cherubini 46'; Cerri 89'	Report	Popovic 54'	Stadium: Stadio Comunale; Attendance: 1,707; Referee: Andrea Calzavara

3 August 2024	Torres (3)	1–2	Mantova (2)	Sassari
20:30 CEST	Goglino 74'	Report	Trimboli 14'; Fiori 21'	Stadium: Stadio Vanni Sanna; Attendance: 2,955; Referee: Andrea Zanotti

4 August 2024	Cesena (2)	3–1	Padova (3)	Cesena
20:30 CEST	Kargbo 9'; Shpendi 38'; Francesconi 86'	Report	Bortolussi 73'	Stadium: Stadio Dino Manuzzi; Attendance: 4,468; Referee: Luca De Angeli

4 August 2024	Avellino (3)	3–1	Juve Stabia (2)	Avellino
20:45 CEST	Tribuzzi 2', 66'; Frascatore 45+1'	Report	Piscopo 21'	Stadium: Stadio Partenio-Adriano Lombardi; Attendance: 5,050; Referee: Roberto Lovison

=== First round ===
A total of 32 teams (4 winners from the preliminary round, the remaining 16 teams from Serie B and 12 Serie A teams seeded 9–20) competed in this round, 16 of which advanced to the second round.

9 August 2024	Sassuolo (2)	2–1	Cittadella (2)	Reggio Emilia
18:00 CEST	Mulattieri 45'; Laurienté 58'	Report	Baldini 48'	Stadium: Mapei Stadium – Città del Tricolore; Attendance: 2,000; Referee: Alessandro Prontera

9 August 2024	Udinese (1)	4–0	Avellino (3)	Udine
18:30 CEST	Brenner 41'; Thauvin 50' (pen.); Lucca 58'; Davis 87'	Report		Stadium: Stadio Friuli; Attendance: 5,850; Referee: Gabriele Scatena

9 August 2024	Genoa (1)	1–0	Reggiana (2)	Genoa
20:45 CEST	Messias 65'	Report		Stadium: Stadio Luigi Ferraris; Attendance: 25,000; Referee: Davide Di Marco

9 August 2024	Monza (1)	0–0 (9–8 p)	Südtirol (2)	Monza
21:15 CEST		Report		Stadium: Stadio Brianteo; Attendance: 7,139; Referee: Francesco Cosso
	Penalties
	Caprari (penalty scored); Mota (penalty scored); Sensi (penalty scored); Caldirola (penalty scored); Marić (penalty scored); Pereira (penalty scored); Kyriakopoulos (penalty scored); Bondo (penalty scored); Izzo (penalty scored)		(penalty scored) Merkaj; (penalty scored) Molina; (penalty scored) Kurtić; (penalty scored) Arrigoni; (penalty scored) Crespi; (penalty scored) Masiello; (penalty scored) Davi; (penalty scored) Ceppitelli; (penalty missed) Praszelik

10 August 2024	Cremonese (2)	1–1 (5–4 p)	Bari (2)	Cremona
18:00 CEST	De Luca 68'	Report	Manzari 80'	Stadium: Stadio Giovanni Zini; Attendance: 3,724; Referee: Simone Galipò
	Penalties
	De Luca (penalty scored); Vázquez (penalty scored); Sernicola (penalty scored); Barbieri (penalty scored); Collocolo (penalty missed); Bonazzoli (penalty scored)		(penalty scored) Benali; (penalty missed) Vicari; (penalty scored) Sibilli; (penalty scored) Manzari; (penalty scored) Novakovich; (penalty missed) Oliveri

10 August 2024	Hellas Verona (1)	1–2	Cesena (2)	Verona
18:30 CEST	Tengstedt 75'	Report	Kargbo 44'; Shpendi 49'	Stadium: Stadio Marcantonio Bentegodi; Attendance: 7,048; Referee: Valerio Crezzini

10 August 2024	Empoli (1)	4–1	Catanzaro (2)	Empoli
20:45 CEST	Fazzini 8', 90+3'; Colombo 48'; Esposito 56'	Report	Bonini 13'	Stadium: Stadio Carlo Castellani; Attendance: 1,738; Referee: Ruben Arena

10 August 2024	Napoli (1)	0–0 (4–3 p)	Modena (2)	Naples
21:15 CEST		Report		Stadium: Stadio Diego Armando Maradona; Attendance: 40,000; Referee: Kevin Bonacina
	Penalties
	Di Lorenzo (penalty scored); Cheddira (penalty missed); Ngonge (penalty scored); Simeone (penalty scored); Kvaratskhelia (penalty scored)		(penalty scored) Palumbo; (penalty scored) Magnino; (penalty missed) Battistella; (penalty scored) Bozhanaj; (penalty missed) Zaro

11 August 2024	Brescia (2)	3–1	Venezia (1)	Brescia
18:00 CEST	Borrelli 14'; Olzer 46', 82'	Report	Idzes 89'	Stadium: Stadio Mario Rigamonti; Attendance: 4,310; Referee: Maria Sole Ferrieri Caputi

11 August 2024	Parma (1)	0–1	Palermo (2)	Parma
18:30 CEST		Report	Insigne 45+2'	Stadium: Stadio Ennio Tardini; Attendance: 5,034; Referee: Daniele Perenzoni

11 August 2024	Sampdoria (2)	1–1 (4–3 p)	Como (1)	Genoa
20:45 CEST	Ioannou 37'	Report	Cutrone 44'	Stadium: Stadio Luigi Ferraris; Attendance: 14,196; Referee: Giuseppe Collu
	Penalties
	Vieira (penalty scored); Benedetti (penalty scored); Meulensteen (penalty missed); Coda (penalty scored); Tutino (penalty scored)		(penalty scored) Da Cunha; (penalty missed) Verdi; (penalty missed) Braunöder; (penalty scored) Baselli; (penalty scored) Strefezza

11 August 2024	Torino (1)	2–0	Cosenza (2)	Turin
21:15 CEST	Camporese 1' (o.g.); Zapata 84'	Report		Stadium: Stadio Olimpico Grande Torino; Attendance: 12,035; Referee: Davide Ghersini

12 August 2024	Frosinone (2)	0–3	Pisa (2)	Frosinone
18:00 CEST		Report	Tramoni 28'; Bonfanti 44'; Arena 89'	Stadium: Stadio Benito Stirpe; Attendance: 9,384; Referee: Francesco Fourneau

12 August 2024	Lecce (1)	2–1	Mantova (2)	Lecce
18:30 CEST	Gaspar 14'; Krstović 86'	Report	Bragantini 73'	Stadium: Stadio Via del mare Attendance: 11,424; Referee: Mario Perri

12 August 2024	Salernitana (2)	3–3 (5–4 p)	Spezia (2)	Salerno
20:45 CEST	Kallon 53'; Dia 68' (pen.), 90+3'	Report	Candelari 43'; Soleri 45', 56'	Stadium: Stadio Arechi; Attendance: 6,905; Referee: Daniele Rutella
	Penalties
	Dia (penalty scored); Kallon (penalty scored); Simy (penalty scored); Bronn (penalty scored); Bradarić (penalty scored)		(penalty scored) Di Serio; (penalty scored) Hristov; (penalty missed) Nagy; (penalty scored) S. Esposito; (penalty scored) P. Esposito

12 August 2024	Cagliari (1)	3–1	Carrarese (2)	Cagliari
21:15 CEST	Piccoli 33', 41'; Prati 71'	Report	Panico 55'	Stadium: Unipol Domus; Attendance: 15,870; Referee: Ivano Pezzuto

=== Second round ===
The sixteen winning teams from the first round competed in the second round, eight of which advanced to the round of 16.

24 September 2024	Lecce (1)	0–2	Sassuolo (2)	Lecce
16:00 CEST		Report	Muharemović 13'; D'Andrea 79'	Stadium: Stadio Via del mare Attendance: 13,951; Referee: Daniele Perenzoni

24 September 2024	Cagliari (1)	1–0	Cremonese (2)	Cagliari
18:30 CEST	Lapadula 60'	Report		Stadium: Unipol Domus; Attendance: 11,017; Referee: Kevin Bonacina

24 September 2024	Torino (1)	1–2	Empoli (1)	Turin
21:00 CEST	Adams 74'	Report	Ekong 30'; Haas 90'	Stadium: Stadio Olimpico Grande Torino; Attendance: 12,334; Referee: Davide Ghersini

25 September 2024	Pisa (2)	0–1	Cesena (2)	Pisa
16:00 CEST		Report	Celia 54'	Stadium: Arena Garibaldi; Attendance: 3,347; Referee: Daniele Rutella

25 September 2024	Udinese (1)	3–1	Salernitana (2)	Udine
18:30 CEST	Bijol 20'; Lucca 44' (pen.); Ekkelenkamp 47'	Report	Simy 25'	Stadium: Stadio Friuli; Attendance: 4,940; Referee: Francesco Cosso

25 September 2024	Genoa (1)	1–1 (5–6 p)	Sampdoria (2)	Genoa
21:00 CEST	Pinamonti 9'	Report	Borini 83'	Stadium: Stadio Luigi Ferraris; Attendance: 28,575; Referee: Federico La Penna
	Penalties
	Miretti (penalty missed); Bani (penalty scored); Bohinen (penalty scored); Vásquez (penalty scored); Vogliacco (penalty scored); Frendrup (penalty scored); Zanoli (penalty missed)		(penalty scored) Borini; (penalty scored) Bereszyński; (penalty missed) Benedetti; (penalty scored) Depaoli; (penalty scored) Tutino; (penalty scored) Sekulov; (penalty scored) Barreca

26 September 2024	Monza (1)	3–1	Brescia (2)	Monza
18:30 CEST	Kyriakopoulos 5'; Pessina 11'; Caprari 40'	Report	Nuamah 68'	Stadium: Stadio Brianteo; Attendance: 3,782; Referee: Federico Dionisi

26 September 2024	Napoli (1)	5–0	Palermo (2)	Naples
21:00 CEST	Ngonge 7', 12'; Juan Jesus 42'; Neres 70'; McTominay 77'	Report		Stadium: Stadio Diego Armando Maradona; Attendance: 51,000; Referee: Giuseppe Collu

== Final stage ==
=== Bracket ===
Round of 16
Juventus	4
Cagliari	0
Fiorentina	2 (3)
Empoli (p)	2 (4)
Atalanta	6
Cesena	1
Bologna	4
Monza	0
Milan	6
Sassuolo	1
Roma	4
Sampdoria	1
Inter	2
Udinese	0
Lazio	3
Napoli	1

Quarter-finals
Juventus	1 (2)
Empoli (p)	1 (4)
Atalanta	0
Bologna	1
Milan	3
Roma	1
Inter	2
Lazio	0

Semi-finals
Empoli	0	1	1
Bologna	3	2	5
Milan	1	3	4
Inter	1	0	1

Final
Bologna	1
Milan	0

=== Round of 16 ===
The round of 16 matches were played between the eight winners from the second round and clubs seeded 1–8 in the 2023–24 Serie A.

3 December 2024	Bologna (1)	4–0	Monza (1)	Bologna
18:30 CET	Pobega 32'; Orsolini 35'; Domínguez 63'; Castro 76'	Report		Stadium: Stadio Renato Dall'Ara; Attendance: 11,952; Referee: Maria Sole Ferrieri Caputi

3 December 2024	Milan (1)	6–1	Sassuolo (2)	Milan
21:00 CET	Chukwueze 12', 21'; Reijnders 17'; Leão 23'; Calabria 56'; Abraham 61'	Report	Mulattieri 59'	Stadium: San Siro; Attendance: 31,392; Referee: Kevin Bonacina

4 December 2024	Fiorentina (1)	2–2 (3–4 p)	Empoli (1)	Florence
21:00 CET	Kean 59'; Sottil 70'	Report	Ekong 4'; Esposito 75'	Stadium: Stadio Artemio Franchi; Attendance: 17,618; Referee: Antonio Giua
	Penalties
	Guðmundsson (penalty scored); Kouamé (penalty scored); Ranieri (penalty missed); Kean (penalty missed); Cataldi (penalty scored)		(penalty scored) Colombo; (penalty missed) Ekong; (penalty scored) Henderson; (penalty scored) Marianucci; (penalty scored) Esposito

5 December 2024	Lazio (1)	3–1	Napoli (1)	Rome
21:00 CET	Noslin 32', 41', 50'	Report	Simeone 36'	Stadium: Stadio Olimpico; Attendance: 35,303; Referee: Luca Pairetto

17 December 2024	Juventus (1)	4–0	Cagliari (1)	Turin
21:00 CET	Vlahović 44'; Koopmeiners 53'; Conceição 80'; González 89'	Report		Stadium: Juventus Stadium; Attendance: 36,768; Referee: Ermanno Feliciani

18 December 2024	Atalanta (1)	6–1	Cesena (2)	Bergamo
18:30 CET	Zappacosta 4'; De Ketelaere 8', 35'; Samardžić 27', 71'; Brescianini 54'	Report	Ceesay 90'	Stadium: Stadio Atleti Azzurri d'Italia; Attendance: 20,234; Referee: Daniele Perenzoni

18 December 2024	Roma (1)	4–1	Sampdoria (2)	Rome
21:00 CET	Dovbyk 9', 19'; Baldanzi 24'; Shomurodov 79'	Report	Yepes 61'	Stadium: Stadio Olimpico; Attendance: 56,858; Referee: Federico Dionisi

19 December 2024	Inter (1)	2–0	Udinese (1)	Milan
21:00 CET	Arnautović 30'; Asllani 45+2'	Report		Stadium: San Siro; Attendance: 53,756; Referee: Luca Massimi

=== Quarter-finals ===
The quarter-final matches were played between clubs advancing from the round of 16.

4 February 2025	Atalanta (1)	0–1	Bologna (1)	Bergamo
21:00 CET		Report	Castro 80'	Stadium: Stadio Atleti Azzurri d'Italia; Attendance: 20,492; Referee: Livio Marinelli

5 February 2025	Milan (1)	3–1	Roma (1)	Milan
21:00 CET	Abraham 16', 42'; Félix 71'	Report	Dovbyk 54'	Stadium: San Siro; Attendance: 57,878; Referee: Marco Piccinini

25 February 2025	Inter (1)	2–0	Lazio (1)	Milan
21:00 CET	Arnautović 39'; Çalhanoğlu 77' (pen.)	Report		Stadium: San Siro; Attendance: 53,333; Referee: Michael Fabbri

26 February 2025	Juventus (1)	1–1 (2–4 p)	Empoli (1)	Turin
21:00 CET	Thuram 66'	Report	Maleh 24'	Stadium: Juventus Stadium; Attendance: 39,304; Referee: Francesco Fourneau
	Penalties
	Vlahović (penalty missed); Kolo Muani (penalty scored); Locatelli (penalty scored); Yıldız (penalty missed)		(penalty scored) Henderson; (penalty scored) Kouamé; (penalty scored) Cacace; (penalty scored) Marianucci

=== Semi-finals ===
The two-legged semi-finals were played between clubs advancing from the quarter-finals.

==== Summary ====
Team 1	Agg.	Team 2	1st leg	2nd leg
Empoli (1)	1–5	Bologna (1)	0–3	1–2
Milan (1)	4–1	Inter (1)	1–1	3–0

==== Matches ====
1 April 2025
21:00 CEST

Empoli (1)	0–3	Bologna (1)
	Report	Orsolini 23'; Dallinga 29', 51'

Stadio Carlo Castellani, Empoli
Attendance: 11,721
Referee: Luca Zufferli
24 April 2025
21:00 CEST

Bologna (1)	2–1	Empoli (1)
Fabbian 7'; Dallinga 86'	Report	Kovalenko 33'

Stadio Renato Dall'Ara, Bologna
Attendance: 27,033
Referee: Matteo Marcenaro

Bologna won 5–1 on aggregate.

2 April 2025
21:00 CEST

Milan (1)	1–1	Inter (1)
Abraham 47'	Report	Çalhanoğlu 67'

San Siro, Milan
Attendance: 67,595
Referee: Michael Fabbri
23 April 2025
21:00 CEST

Inter (1)	0–3	Milan (1)
	Report	Jović 36', 49'; Reijnders 85'

San Siro, Milan
Attendance: 75,552
Referee: Daniele Doveri

Milan won 4–1 on aggregate.

=== Final ===
14 May 2025
21:00 CEST

Milan	0–1	Bologna
	Report	Ndoye 53'

Stadio Olimpico, Rome
Attendance: 68,490
Referee: Maurizio Mariani

== Top goalscorers ==
Rank	Player	Club	Goals
1	(England) Tammy Abraham	Milan	4
2	(Netherlands) Thijs Dallinga	Bologna	3
2	(Ukraine) Artem Dovbyk	Roma	3
2	(Netherlands) Tijjani Noslin	Lazio	3
5	(Austria) Marko Arnautović	Inter Milan	2
5	(Turkey) Hakan Çalhanoğlu	Inter Milan	2
5	(Argentina) Santiago Castro	Bologna	2
5	(Nigeria) Samuel Chukwueze	Milan	2
5	(Belgium) Charles De Ketelaere	Atalanta	2
5	(Senegal) Boulaye Dia	Lazio	2
5	(Sweden) Emmanuel Ekong	Empoli	2
5	(Italy) Sebastiano Esposito	Empoli	2
5	(Italy) Jacopo Fazzini	Empoli	2
5	(Serbia) Luka Jović	Milan	2
5	(Sierra Leone) Augustus Kargbo	Cesena	2
5	(Italy) Lorenzo Lucca	Udinese	2
5	(Italy) Samuele Mulattieri	Sassuolo	2
5	(Belgium) Cyril Ngonge	Napoli	2
5	(Italy) Giacomo Olzer	Brescia	2
5	(Italy) Riccardo Orsolini	Bologna	2
5	(Italy) Roberto Piccoli	Cagliari	2
5	(Netherlands) Tijjani Reijnders	Milan	2
5	(Serbia) Lazar Samardžić	Atalanta	2
5	(Albania) Cristian Shpendi	Cesena	2
5	(Italy) Edoardo Soleri	Spezia	2
5	(Italy) Alessio Tribuzzi	Avellino	2
