= Malagrida =

Malagrida is a surname. Notable people with the surname include:

- Gabriel Malagrida (1689–1761), Italian Jesuit missionary
- Lorenzo Malagrida (born 2003), Italian footballer
