= Lorenzo Mezzotero =

Footballer (born 2008)

Personal information
- Date of birth: 16 August 2008 (age 18)
- Place of birth: Monza, Italy
- Height: 1.90 m (6 ft 3 in)
- Position: Forward

Team information
- Current team: Sampdoria
- Number: 39

Youth career
- 2016–2020: Neftçi Baku
- 2020–2021: Vigor Milano
- 2021–2023: Atalanta
- 2023–2024: Marcet Foundation
- 2024–2026: Sampdoria

Senior career*
Years	Team	Apps	(Gls)
2026–	Sampdoria	3	(1)

International career^{‡}
2026–	Azerbaijan U21	5	(1)
- * Club domestic league appearances and goals as of 6 October 2026 ‡ National team caps and goals as of 6 October 2026

Lorenzo Mezzotero (born 16 August 2008) is a professional footballer who plays as a forward for Serie B club Sampdoria. Born in Italy, he plays for the Azerbaijan under-21 national team.

== Early career ==
Mezzotero was born in Italy and moved to Azerbaijan at the age of 6 with his family. He started playing at the academy of Neftçi Baku at the age of 8. At the age of 12, his family returned to Italy, and he began playing for the academy of Sampdoria.

== Club career ==
Promoted to Sampdoria's senior squad for the 2026–27 Serie B season, Mezzotero made his professional debut as a substitute against Juve Stabia on 29 August 2026. Lorenzo scored his first professional goal in Serie B on October 31st, in a game against Virtus Entella.

== International career ==
Eligible to play for both Italy and Azerbaijan, Mezzotero elected to play for Azerbaijan national team. He made his debut for Azerbaijan U-21 in June 2026 with a friendly match against Bahrain, and scored in his first game.

In November 2026, Lorenzo was invited to the senior national team for the first time, however missed the call up due to an injury.

== Career statistics ==
As of match played 8 November 2026

=== Club ===
Appearances and goals by club, season and competition
Club	Season	League			National cup		Continental		Total	
Club	Season	Division	Apps	Goals	Apps	Goals	Apps	Goals	Apps	Goals
Sampdoria	2026-27	Serie B	4	1	0	0	—		4	1
Career total			4	1	0	0	0	0	4	1

=== International ===
Appearances and goals by national team and year
National team	Year	Apps	Goals
Azerbaijan U21	2026	5	1
Total		5	1
