= Marco Silvestri =

Italian footballer

Personal information
- Full name: Marco Silvestri
- Date of birth: 2 March 1991 (age 35)
- Place of birth: Castelnovo ne' Monti, Italy
- Height: 1.91 m (6 ft 3 in)
- Position: Goalkeeper

Team information
- Current team: Fatih Karagümrük
- Number: 1

Youth career
- 2006–2011: Modena
- 2010–2011: → Chievo (loan)

Senior career*
Years	Team	Apps	(Gls)
2009–2011	Modena	0	(0)
2010–2011	→ Chievo (loan)	0	(0)
2011–2014	Chievo	0	(0)
2011–2012	→ Reggiana (loan)	27	(0)
2012–2013	→ Padova (loan)	25	(0)
2014	→ Cagliari (loan)	3	(0)
2014–2017	Leeds United	88	(0)
2017–2021	Hellas Verona	107	(0)
2021–2024	Udinese	90	(0)
2024–2025	Sampdoria	7	(0)
2025	Empoli	5	(0)
2025–2026	Cremonese	4	(0)
2026–	Fatih Karagümrük	0	(0)

International career
2009–2011	Italy U20	5	(0)
2011	Italy U21	1	(0)
- * Club domestic league appearances and goals as of 24 May 2026

Marco Silvestri (born 2 March 1991) is an Italian professional footballer who plays as a goalkeeper for Turkish TFF 1. Lig club Fatih Karagümrük.

Silvestri has represented his country at under-20 and under-21 level.

== Club career ==
=== Modena ===
Born in Castelnovo ne' Monti, the Province of Reggio Emilia, Emilia–Romagna, Silvestri started his career at Emilia club Modena. He was the third keeper behind Enrico Alfonso and Antonio Narciso in 2009–10 season.

=== Chievo ===
In August 2010, Silvestri was signed by Serie A club Chievo on a temporary deal, with an option to purchase half of his registration rights. He was the third keeper of the team, behind Stefano Sorrentino and Lorenzo Squizzi. Silvestri also became the first choice keeper at the "spring" under-20 team. In June 2011 Chievo exercised the option to sign Silvestri in a co-ownership deal, for €300,000.

==== Reggiana loan ====
Silvestri returned to Reggio Emilia for Reggiana in July to replace Niccolò Manfredini. However Silvestri became the backup of Niccolò Bellucci since round 12. After the winter break Silvestri re-affirmed as first choice. In June 2012 Chievo signed Silvestri outright for another €150,000.

==== Padova loan ====
In July 2012 he left for Padova. The club failed to renew the loan of fellow U21 internationals Mattia Perin. Silvestri wore no.1 shirt for Padova in new season and would compete with ex-internationals Ivan Pelizzoli who acted as second-choice last season. However, on the last day of the transfer window, Pelizzoli rejoined Perin in Pescara and Luca Anania, who became second choice in the same club, left for Padova.

==== Cagliari loan ====
On 30 January 2014, Silvestri signed for Cagliari on loan, including the option for Cagliari to acquire half his ownership rights at the end of the season, the move saw Cagliari first choice Goalkeeper Michael Agazzi join Chievo on a permanent deal.

Silverstri was given the number 1 shirt. He made his debut for the club in the Serie A match against Parma on 27 April, coming into the side for Vlada Avramov, keeping a clean sheet on his debut in a 1–0 win. On 6 May, Silvestri started the match against S.S.C. Napoli, a game in which Silvestri was given a straight red card in a 3–0 loss after fouling Goran Pandev. After returning from suspension he returned for the final match of the season in a 3–0 loss against Juventus.

On 27 June, Silvestri's agent Francesco Romano, revealed that Silvestri was in talks over a move to English club Leeds United, owned by former Cagliari owner Massimo Cellino.

=== Leeds United ===
==== 2014–15 season ====
On 8 July 2014, Silvestri left Chievo for a fee of €1 million, and signed a four-year contract with English club Leeds United along with fellow Italian Tommaso Bianchi. Silvestri's first appearance for Leeds came on 11 July in Leeds' first pre–season game, which resulted in a 16–0 victory against Italian side FC Gherdeina. On 1 August, Silvestri was assigned the Leeds number 1 shirt for the 2014–15 season. Silvestri made his debut for Leeds on 9 August against Millwall. Silvestri kept his first clean sheet for Leeds in his home debut at Elland Road on 16 August in Leeds' 1–0 victory against Middlesbrough after a goal by Billy Sharp.

Silvestri kept a clean sheet and won the man of the match award after a string of saves in Leeds' 1–0 win on 30 August against Bolton Wanderers. The performance led to him being named in the Football League team of the week. Silvestri's impressive form continued against Bournemouth in a 3–1 win. With Silvestri earning praise from caretaker head coach Neil Redfearn after a string of impressive saves to help keep Leeds in the game when they were 1–0 down.

Silvestri received the Man of the Match Award after keeping a clean sheet against the then league leaders Middlesbrough 1–0 on 21 February 2015. On 4 March, Silvestri saved a late penalty from Daryl Murphy to help earn Leeds a 2–1 victory against Ipswich Town.

On 18 April 2015, Silvestri was one of six Massimo Cellino signings (alongside Mirco Antenucci, Giuseppe Bellusci, Souleymane Doukara, Dario Del Fabro, Edgar Çani) who controversially pulled out of the squad with an 'injury' the day before a 2–1 loss against Charlton Athletic.

On 2 May 2015, Silvestri was one of five players nominated for the Fans Player Of The Year Award at Leeds United's official end of 2014–15 season awards ceremony, but lost out to eventual winner Alex Mowatt. After the end of the 2014–15 season, Silvestri after an impressive debut season said "Life in Leeds is good. Me and my wife feel at home here".

==== 2015–16 season ====
After the signing of goalkeeper Ross Turnbull on 15 July 2015, head coach Uwe Rösler said Silvestri would still be the club's number 1 goalkeeper. Turnbull revealed he was going to challenge Silvestri for the Number 1 shirt.

==== 2016–17 season ====
After the signing of Robert Green as the club's first choice goalkeeper, Silvestri on 5 August was given the squad number 12 shirt for the 2016–17 season. He made his first appearance of the season for Leeds on 23 August 2016, starting in Leeds' League Cup fixture against Luton Town. On 26 October 2016, Silvestri was the hero for Leeds, after saving three penalties for Leeds in their victory against Norwich City in the English League Cup, with a dramatic penalty shootout victory after a 2–2 draw in extra time.

On 29 November 2016, Silvestri started for Leeds in EFL Cup quarter-final match against Liverpool at Anfield in a 2–0 defeat.

=== Hellas Verona ===
On 18 July 2017, Silvestri played the full 90 minutes of a closed-door friendly between Leeds and Bursaspor, but the next day he travelled to Verona to complete a transfer to Serie A club Hellas Verona, for an undisclosed fee.

=== Sampdoria ===
On 30 August 2024, Silvestri moved to Sampdoria in Serie B until 30 June 2025.

=== Empoli ===
On 30 January 2025, Silvestri returned to Serie A and signed with Empoli.

=== Cremonese ===
On 13 August 2025, Silvestri signed with Cremonese, staying in Serie A after Empoli's relegation.

== International career ==
Silvestri started his national career in the 2008 goalkeeper training camp.

Silvestri received his first cap in December 2009 from Francesco Rocca for the Italy U20 team. He played that match, the round 3 of 2009–10 Four Nations Tournament, replacing Antonio Piccolo in the second half. He also played the last round (round 6) in that tournament. Silvestri played twice (out of 6 games) in the 2010–11 edition.

In June 2011, he was picked for the Italy Under 21s team by Ciro Ferrara to represent his country in the 2011 Toulon Tournament, serving as backup to Sergio Viotti. Silvestri only played once in the bronze match. After the tournament he did not receive a call-up for the 2013 UEFA European Under-21 Football Championship qualification.

On 17 July 2015, Ermes Fulgoni who was Gianluigi Buffon's former goalkeeping coach at Parma described Silvestri as the heir to Buffon and tipped him to be Italy's future number 1 goalkeeper.

On 2 October 2020, he received his first senior team call-up.

== Personal life ==
Silvestri's wife is Moroccan Givenchy fashion model Sofia Jamal Eddine. Silvestri said Eddine, who speaks fluent Italian and English, had been helping teach him English.

== Career statistics ==
As of match played 25 October 2025

Appearances and goals by club, season and competition
Club	Season	League			National cup (Note: Includes Coppa Italia, FA Cup)		League cup (Note: Includes EFL Cup)		Other		Total	
Club	Season	Division	Apps	Goals	Apps	Goals	Apps	Goals	Apps	Goals	Apps	Goals
Modena	2009–10	Serie B	0	0	1	0	—		—		1	0
Chievo (loan)	2010–11	Serie A	0	0	0	0	—		—		0	0
Reggiana (loan)	2011–12	Lega Pro	27	0	1	0	—		—		28	0
Padova (loan)	2012–13	Serie B	25	0	0	0	—		—		25	0
Chievo	2013–14	Serie A	0	0	2	0	—		—		2	0
Cagliari (loan)	2013–14	Serie A	3	0	—		—		—		3	0
Leeds United	2014–15	Championship	43	0	1	0	0	0	—		44	0
Leeds United	2015–16	Championship	45	0	3	0	0	0	—		48	0
Leeds United	2016–17	Championship	0	0	2	0	4	0	—		6	0
Leeds United	Total		88	0	6	0	4	0	—		98	0
Hellas Verona	2017–18	Serie A	2	0	2	0	—		—		4	0
Hellas Verona	2018–19	Serie B	36	0	1	0	—		5 (Note: Appearances in Serie B promotion play-offs)	0	42	0
Hellas Verona	2019–20	Serie A	35	0	1	0	—		—		36	0
Hellas Verona	2020–21	Serie A	34	0	0	0	—		—		34	0
Hellas Verona	Total		107	0	4	0	—		5	0	116	0
Udinese	2021–22	Serie A	35	0	2	0	—		—		37	0
Udinese	2022–23	Serie A	38	0	1	0	—		—		39	0
Udinese	2023–24	Serie A	17	0	1	0	—		—		18	0
Udinese	2024–25	Serie A	0	0	0	0	—		—		0	0
Udinese	Total		90	0	4	0	—		—		94	0
Sampdoria	2024–25	Serie B	7	0	1	0	—		—		8	0
Empoli	2024–25	Serie A	5	0	0	0	—		—		5	0
Cremonese	2025–26	Serie A	4	0	0	0	—		—		4	0
Career total			356	0	19	0	4	0	5	0	384	0
