= Ebenezer Akinsanmiro =

Nigerian footballer (born 2004)

Personal information
- Full name: Ebenezer Ajodun Akinsanmiro
- Date of birth: 25 November 2004 (age 21)
- Place of birth: Lagos, Nigeria
- Height: 1.84 m (6 ft 0 in)
- Position: Midfielder

Team information
- Current team: Monza (on loan from Inter Milan)
- Number: 14

Youth career
- –2021: Beyond Limits
- 2022: → Alex Transfiguration (loan)
- 2023–2024: Inter Milan

Senior career*
Years	Team	Apps	(Gls)
2021–2023	Remo Stars	4	(0)
2023–	Inter Milan	1	(0)
2024–2025	→ Sampdoria (loan)	35	(1)
2025–2026	→ Pisa (loan)	24	(0)
2026–	→ Monza (loan)	0	(0)

International career^{‡}
2025–	Nigeria	1	(0)
Medal record
Men's football
Representing Nigeria
Africa Cup of Nations
Third place	2025 Morocco
- * Club domestic league appearances and goals as of 25 May 2026 ‡ National team caps and goals as of 16 December 2025

Ebenezer Ajodun Akinsanmiro (Hausa pronunciation; born 25 November 2004) is a Nigerian professional footballer who plays as a midfielder for Serie A club Monza, on loan from Inter Milan, and the Nigeria national team.

== Club career ==
=== Early career ===
Akinsanmiro began his career at Beyond Limits, the youth sector of Remo Stars. He was promoted to the Remo Stars first team ahead of the 2020–21 season, helping the club win promotion from the Nigeria National League to the Nigeria Professional Football League at the end of the campaign.

In March 2022, Akinsanmiro briefly joined Lagos-based club Alex Transfiguration to compete in the Torneo di Viareggio. The team reached the final before losing to Sassuolo on penalties.

=== Inter Milan ===
On 31 January 2023, Akinsanmiro joined Italian club Inter Milan on a permanent deal, signing a four-year contract. During the 2022–23 season, while playing for the club's under-19 team, he also received his first call-ups to the first team under manager Simone Inzaghi. On 24 May, he was an unused substitute on the bench for Inter, as the club won their ninth Coppa Italia title over Fiorentina. He made his first-team debut for Inter on 25 February 2024, coming on as a substitute for Davide Frattesi in the 76th minute of a 4–0 league victory over Lecce.

==== Loans to Sampdoria and Pisa ====
On 19 July 2024, Akinsanmiro joined Serie B club Sampdoria on a season-long loan, with an option to buy and a buy-back clause in favor of Inter. He made his debut for the club on 11 August, starting in a Coppa Italia match against Como, which ended in a 5–4 win after the shoot-out. His first goal came on 20 October, in a 5–3 away victory over Cesena, scoring Sampdoria's final goal of the match. During the season, Akinsanmiro made 36 appearances, earning praise for his performances despite Sampdoria's difficult campaign.

On 22 July 2025, Akinsanmiro joined newly promoted Serie A club Pisa on loan. The deal included an option to buy for €6 million, with Inter retaining the right to buy him back for an additional €750,000. He made 24 appearances in the top flight, but following Pisa's relegation at the end of the season, the club did not exercise the option to purchase him due to administrative issues. Akinsanmiro subsequently returned to Inter, joining the club's pre-season training camp under manager Cristian Chivu, who had previously coached him at Inter's Primavera side.

=== Monza ===
On 1 August 2026, Akinsanmiro joined newly promoted Serie A side Monza on a year-long loan with an obligation to buy.

== International career ==
On 11 December 2025, Akinsanmiro was called up to the Nigeria squad for the 2025 Africa Cup of Nations. He made his debut on 16 December 2025, starting in a pre-tournament friendly game against Egypt which Nigeria lost 2–1.

== Style of play ==
Akinsanmiro is a versatile midfielder, capable of playing both as a central midfielder and as a box-to-box midfielder, thanks to his speed and ability to make attacking runs. He is also noted for his dribbling ability.

== Career statistics ==
=== Club ===
As of match played 23 May 2026

Appearances and goals by club, season and competition
Club	Season	League			National cup (Note: Includes Nigeria Federation Cup, Coppa Italia)		Continental		Other		Total	
Club	Season	Division	Apps	Goals	Apps	Goals	Apps	Goals	Apps	Goals	Apps	Goals
Remo Stars	2021–22	NPFL	4	0	0	0	—		—		4	0
Remo Stars	2022–23	NPFL	0	0	0	0	—		—		0	0
Remo Stars	Total		4	0	0	0	0	0	0	0	4	0
Inter Milan	2023–24	Serie A	1	0	0	0	0	0	0	0	1	0
Sampdoria (loan)	2024–25	Serie B	35	1	3	0	—		—		38	1
Pisa (loan)	2025–26	Serie A	24	0	1	0	—		—		25	0
Career Total			65	1	4	0	0	0	0	0	69	1

== Honours ==
Inter Milan

- Serie A: 2023–24
- Coppa Italia: 2022–23
- Supercoppa Italiana: 2023

Nigeria

- Africa Cup of Nations third place: 2025
