= Simone Ghidotti =

Italian footballer (born 2000)

Personal information
- Date of birth: 19 March 2000 (age 26)
- Place of birth: Brescia, Italy
- Height: 1.93 m (6 ft 4 in)
- Position: Goalkeeper

Team information
- Current team: Parma
- Number: 22

Youth career
- –2014: Lumezzane
- 2014–2019: Fiorentina

Senior career*
| Years | Team | Apps | (Gls) |
| 2018–2022 | Fiorentina | 0 | (0) |
| 2019–2021 | → Pergolettese (loan) | 56 | (0) |
| 2021–2022 | → Gubbio (loan) | 35 | (0) |
| 2022–2025 | Como | 18 | (0) |
| 2023–2024 | → Avellino (loan) | 38 | (0) |
| 2024–2025 | → Sampdoria (loan) | 9 | (0) |
| 2025–2026 | Sampdoria | 20 | (0) |
| 2026– | Parma | 0 | (0) |

International career
| 2015 | Italy U15 | 2 | (0) |
| 2015–2016 | Italy U16 | 11 | (0) |
| 2016–2017 | Italy U17 | 12 | (0) |
| 2017–2018 | Italy U18 | 10 | (0) |
| 2018 | Italy U19 | 1 | (0) |
| 2019 | Italy U20 | 3 | (0) |
- * Club domestic league appearances and goals as of 20 September 2026

Simone Ghidotti (born 19 March 2000) is an Italian professional footballer who plays as a goalkeeper for Serie A club Parma.

== Club career ==
=== Fiorentina ===
Born in Brescia, Ghidotti was a youth exponent of Fiorentina.

==== Loan to Pergolettese ====
On 19 July 2019, Ghidotti was loaned to newly- promoted Serie C club Pergolettese on a season-long loan deal. Five weeks later, on 25 August, he made his professional debut in Serie C, in a 2–0 away defeat against Como. On 22 September, he kept his first clean sheet for the club in a 0–0 away draw against Novara. One week later, on 29 September, he kept his second clean sheet for Pergolettese, in a 0–0 away draw with Pro Vercelli. Ghidotti ended his first loan spell with 23 appearances, 30 goals conceded, and 6 clean sheets, successfully helping the club avoid relegation to Serie D, with a 3–3 draw (on aggregate) against Pianese in the play-out.

On 22 September 2020, the loan was extended for another season. Ghidotti made his seasonal debut five days later, on 27 September in a 3–3 away draw against Lucchese. On 18 October, he kept his first clean sheet for the club, in a 1–0 home win over Pro Sesto, and four days later, on 22 October, his second consecutive clean sheet in a 0–0 away draw with Como. Ghidotti became Pergolettese's first-choice goalkeeper early in the season. He kept his third clean sheet in December, in a 2–0 home win over Novara. On 11 April 2021, Ghidotti was given a straight red card in the 93rd minute of a 1–0 home defeat against Piacenza. Ghidotti ended his second season at Pergolettese with 35 appearances, 44 goals conceded and 11 clean sheets.

==== Loan to Gubbio ====
On 18 July 2021, he moved to Gubbio on a season-long loan.

=== Como ===
On 20 July 2022, Ghidotti signed a three-year contract with Como.

=== Avellino ===
On 12 July 2023, Ghidotti joined Avellino on a season-long loan.

=== Sampdoria ===
On 1 August 2024, Ghidotti signed a three-year contract with Sampdoria. The first season of the contract is a loan, followed by an obligation to buy.

=== Parma ===
On 1 September 2026, Ghidotti moved to Parma in Serie A, returning to the top tier for the first time in 7 years.

== Personal life ==
On 23 August 2020, he tested positive for COVID-19.

== Career statistics ==
=== Club ===
As of match played 27 February 2026

Appearances and goals by club, season and competition
| Club | Season | League | | | Cup (Note: Includes Coppa Italia and Coppa Italia Serie C) | | Other | | Total | |
| Club | Season | League | Apps | Goals | Apps | Goals | Apps | Goals | Apps | Goals |
|---|---|---|---|---|---|---|---|---|---|---|
| Pergolettese (loan) | 2019–20 | Serie C | 21 | 0 | 1 | 0 | 2 (Note: Appearances in Serie C-Relegation play-offs) | 0 | 23 | 0 |
| Pergolettese (loan) | 2020–21 | Serie C | 35 | 0 | 0 | 0 | — | | 35 | 0 |
| Pergolettese (loan) | Total | | 56 | 0 | 1 | 0 | 2 | 0 | 59 | 0 |
| Gubbio (loan) | 2021–22 | Serie C | 35 | 0 | 1 | 0 | 2 (Note: Appearances in Serie C-Promotion play-offs) | 0 | 38 | 0 |
| Como | 2022–23 | Serie B | 18 | 0 | 1 | 0 | — | | 19 | 0 |
| Avellino (loan) | 2023–24 | Serie C | 38 | 0 | 0 | 0 | 4 | 0 | 32 | 0 |
| Sampdoria (loan) | 2024–25 | Serie B | 9 | 0 | 1 | 0 | — | | 10 | 0 |
| Sampdoria | 2025–26 | Serie B | 20 | 0 | 1 | 0 | — | | 21 | 0 |
| Sampdoria | 2026–27 | Serie B | 0 | 0 | 0 | 0 | — | | 0 | 0 |
| Sampdoria | Total | | 29 | 0 | 2 | 0 | — | | 31 | 0 |
| Parma | 2026–27 | Serie A | 0 | 0 | 0 | 0 | — | | 0 | 0 |
| Career total | | | 176 | 0 | 5 | 0 | 8 | 0 | 189 | 0 |
