= Stipe Vulikić =

Croatian footballer (born 2001)

Personal information
- Date of birth: 23 January 2001 (age 25)
- Place of birth: Split, Croatia
- Height: 1.93 m (6 ft 4 in)
- Position: Centre-back

Team information
- Current team: Septemvri Sofia (on loan from Levski Sofia)
- Number: 25

Youth career
- –2017: Hajduk Split
- 2017–2019: Solin

Senior career*
Years	Team	Apps	(Gls)
2019–2021	Solin	37	(1)
2021–2023	Hrvatski Dragovoljac	30	(0)
2022–2023	→ Perugia (loan)	6	(0)
2023–2024	Perugia	28	(0)
2024–2026	Sampdoria	25	(0)
2025	→ Modena (loan)	6	(0)
2026–	Levski Sofia	5	(0)
2026–	→ Septemvri Sofia (loan)	0	(0)

International career
2020	Croatia U19	1	(0)
2022	Croatia U20	3	(0)
- * Club domestic league appearances and goals as of 13 April 2026

Stipe Vulikić (born 23 January 2001) is a Croatian professional footballer who plays as a centre-back for Bulgarian First League club Septemvri Sofia, on loan from Levski Sofia.

== Club career ==
On 13 July 2022, Vulikić joined Perugia in Italy on a season-long loan with an option to buy. He made his Serie B debut for Perugia on 3 September 2022 in a game against Brescia.

On 28 July 2024, Vulikić moved to Sampdoria on a three-season contract. On 3 February 2025, he was loaned by Modena, with an option to buy.

== Honours ==
Levski Sofia

- Bulgarian First League: 2025–26
