= Lorenzo Malagrida =

Italian footballer (born 2003)

Personal information
- Date of birth: 24 October 2003 (age 23)
- Place of birth: Pietra Ligure, Italy
- Height: 1.70 m (5 ft 7 in)
- Positions: Attacking midfielder; winger

Team information
- Current team: Livorno
- Number: 11

Youth career
- FBC Finale
- Vado
- 2016–2023: Sampdoria

Senior career*
Years	Team	Apps	(Gls)
2023–2026	Sampdoria	6	(0)
2024–2025	→ Rimini (loan)	40	(2)
2026–	Livorno	15	(3)
- * Club domestic league appearances and goals as of 30 April 2026

Lorenzo Malagrida (born 24 October 2003) is an Italian professional footballer who plays as an attacking midfielder or winger for Serie C Group B club Livorno.

== Career ==
Malagrida played for FBC Finale and Vado, before joining the youth sector of Sampdoria, which he signed his first professional contract for in September 2022.

On 12 January 2023, he made his professional debut for the club, coming on as a substitute for Abdelhamid Sabiri in the 77th minute of a 1–0 Coppa Italia loss to Fiorentina.

On 17 January 2024, Malagrida was loaned out to Serie C side Rimini until the end of the season. On 15 July 2024, the loan was renewed for the 2024–25 season.

On 22 January 2026, Malagrida signed with Serie C club Livorno.

== Personal life ==
Malagrida is the nephew of former Italian footballer Antonio Manicone.

== Career statistics ==
As of math played 28 March 2026

Appearances and goals by club, season and competition
Club	Season	League			Coppa Italia		Other		Total	
Club	Season	Division	Apps	Goals	Apps	Goals	Apps	Goals	Apps	Goals
Sampdoria	2022–23	Serie A	6	0	1	0	—		7	0
Sampdoria	2023–24	Serie B	0	0	0	0	0	0	0	0
Sampdoria	2024–25	Serie B	0	0	0	0	0	0	0	0
Sampdoria	2025–26	Serie B	0	0	0	0	—		0	0
Sampdoria	Total		6	0	1	0	0	0	7	0
Rimini (loan)	2023–24	Serie C	14	1	—		4 (Note: Two appearances in Coppa Italia Serie C; Two appearances in Serie C Promotion play-offs)	0	18	1
Rimini (loan)	2024–25	Serie C	26	1	—		6 (Note: Five appearances, one goal in Coppa Italia Serie C; One appearance in Serie C Promotion play-offs)	1	32	2
Rimini (loan)	Total		40	2	—		10	1	50	3
Livorno	2025–26	Serie C	12	3	—		—		12	3
Career total			58	5	1	0	10	1	69	6
