= Leonardo Benedetti =

Italian footballer (born 2000)

Personal information
- Date of birth: 6 June 2000 (age 26)
- Place of birth: La Spezia, Italy
- Height: 1.82 m (6 ft 0 in)
- Position: Defensive midfielder

Team information
- Current team: Virtus Entella
- Number: 32

Youth career
- –2019: Spezia
- 2018–2019: → Sampdoria (loan)

Senior career*
Years	Team	Apps	(Gls)
2017–2019	Spezia	0	(0)
2018–2019	→ Sampdoria (loan)	0	(0)
2019–2026	Sampdoria	52	(1)
2019–2020	→ Spezia (loan)	1	(0)
2020–2021	→ Vis Pesaro (loan)	19	(0)
2021–2022	→ Imolese (loan)	35	(5)
2022–2023	→ Bari (loan)	31	(3)
2026–	Virtus Entella	11	(0)

International career
2017	Italy U18	1	(0)
- * Club domestic league appearances and goals as of 13 May 2026

Leonardo Benedetti (born 6 June 2000) is an Italian professional footballer who plays as a defensive midfielder for Serie B club Virtus Entella.

== Club career ==
=== Spezia ===
Benedetti was raised in Spezia youth teams and started playing for their Under-19 squad in the 2017–18 season. He was called up to the senior squad during the 2017–18 Serie B season, but did not make any appearances.

==== Loan to Sampdoria ====
On 31 July 2018, Benedetti joined Serie A club Sampdoria on a two-year loan. He spent the 2018–19 season with their Under-19 squad.

=== Sampdoria ===
==== Loan to Spezia ====
On 19 July 2019, his rights were bought out by Sampdoria who immediately loaned him back to Spezia for the 2019–20 season.

He made his professional Serie B debut for Spezia on 21 September 2019 in a game against Perugia. He substituted Matteo Ricci in the 81st minute. That remained his only appearance for Spezia.

==== Loan to Vis Pesaro ====
On 17 January 2020, Benedetti joined Serie C club Vis Pesaro until the end of the 2019–20 season.

On 28 August 2020, the loan has been extended.

==== Loan to Imolese ====
On 3 August 2021, Benedetti moved to Imolese on loan.

==== Loan to Bari ====
On 12 July 2022, Benedetti moved to Bari on loan.

=== Virtus Entella ===
On 29 January 2026, Benedetti joined Virtus Entella in Serie B on a permanent transfer.

== International career ==
Benedetti made his first appearance representing his country on 9 August 2017 in an Italy national under-18 football team friendly against Slovenia.
