= Thomas Battistella =

Italian footballer

Personal information
- Date of birth: 29 July 2001 (age 25)
- Place of birth: Pordenone, Italy
- Height: 1.72 m (5 ft 8 in)
- Position: Midfielder

Team information
- Current team: Juve Stabia

Youth career
- Udinese

Senior career*
Years	Team	Apps	(Gls)
2019–2022	Udinese	0	(0)
2021–2022	→ Carrarese (loan)	34	(7)
2022–2025	Modena	51	(2)
2025–	Juve Stabia	0	(0)
- * Club domestic league appearances and goals as of 17 May 2025

Thomas Battistella (born 29 July 2001) is an Italian professional footballer who plays as a midfielder for Serie B club Juve Stabia.

== Career ==
On 28 July 2022, Battistella signed a four-year contract with Modena.

On 29 July 2025, he moved to Juve Stabia on a two-year deal.
