= Matteo Ricci (footballer, born May 1994) =

Italian footballer (born 1994)

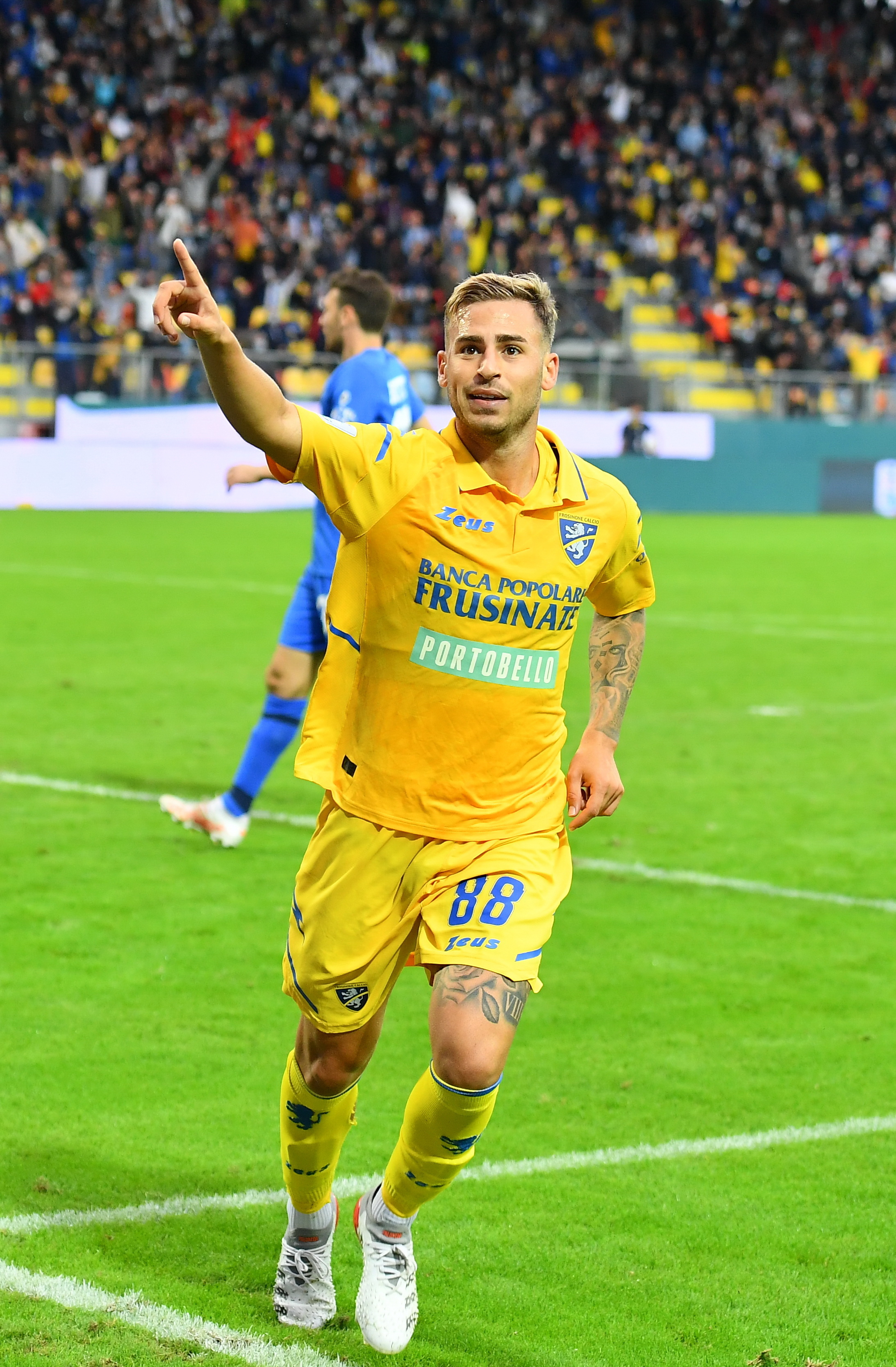
- Ricci with Frosinone in 2021

Personal information
- Date of birth: 27 May 1994 (age 32)
- Place of birth: Rome, Italy
- Height: 1.76 m (5 ft 9 in)
- Position: Midfielder

Team information
- Current team: Ascoli
- Number: 27

Youth career
- 2008–2013: Roma

Senior career*
Years	Team	Apps	(Gls)
2013–2018	Roma	0	(0)
2013–2014	→ Grosseto (loan)	25	(1)
2014–2015	→ Carpi (loan)	0	(0)
2015	→ Pistoiese (loan)	11	(1)
2015–2016	→ Pisa (loan)	32	(2)
2016–2017	→ Perugia (loan)	22	(2)
2017–2018	→ Salernitana (loan)	33	(3)
2018–2021	Spezia	87	(8)
2021–2023	Frosinone	31	(2)
2022–2023	→ Fatih Karagümrük (loan)	16	(1)
2023–2026	Sampdoria	54	(1)
2026–	Ascoli	0	(0)

International career
2012	Italy U18	6	(0)
2012–2013	Italy U19	12	(3)
2013–2014	Italy U20	8	(1)
- * Club domestic league appearances and goals as of 23 August 2026

Matteo Ricci (born 27 May 1994) is an Italian professional footballer who plays as a midfielder for Serie B club Ascoli. He is the twin brother of fellow footballer Federico Ricci.

== Club career ==
On 31 July 2018, Ricci joined Serie B club Spezia on a permanent basis. His previous club Roma had a buy-back option.

On 30 August 2021, he signed a three-year contract with Frosinone.

On 4 July 2022, Ricci was loaned to Fatih Karagümrük in Turkey with an option to buy.

On 10 July 2023, Ricci joined Sampdoria on a three-year deal.

== International career ==
Ricci was called up to the senior Italy squad in March 2021.

== Personal life ==
On 1 January 2021, he tested positive for COVID-19.
