= Simone Trimboli =

Italian footballer (born 2002)

Personal information
- Date of birth: 19 April 2002 (age 24)
- Place of birth: Lavagna, Italy
- Height: 1.76 m (5 ft 9 in)
- Position: Midfielder

Team information
- Current team: Mantova
- Number: 21

Youth career
- 2010–2021: Sampdoria

Senior career*
Years	Team	Apps	(Gls)
2021–2023	Sampdoria	5	(0)
2023	→ Ferencváros II (loan)	15	(5)
2023–	Mantova	106	(5)

International career^{‡}
2017	Italy U15	9	(0)
2017–2018	Italy U16	14	(0)
2018–2019	Italy U17	6	(0)
- * Club domestic league appearances and goals as of 13 May 2026 ‡ National team caps and goals as of 16:09, 4 April 2022 (UTC)

Simone Trimboli (born 19 April 2002) is an Italian professional footballer who plays as a midfielder for Serie B club Mantova.

== Club career ==
=== Sampdoria ===
Trimboli joined the youth academy of Sampdoria in 2010, and worked his way up their youth categories. He captained their U18s for the 2019–20 season. On 8 October 2021, he signed a professional contract with the club, keeping him until June 2024. He made his professional debut with Sampdoria in a 3–1 Serie A loss to Juventus on 12 March 2022.

=== Ferencváros (loan) ===
On 14 February 2023, he was loaned for the remaining part of the 2022–23 Nemzeti Bajnokság I season to Ferencváros. He was initially assigned to the reserve team Ferencváros II in the third-tier NB III.

=== Mantova ===
On 28 July 2023, Trimboli signed a three-year contract with Mantova.

== International career ==
Trimboli is a youth international for Italy, having represented the Italy U15s, U16s, and U17s.
