= Alessandro Pio Riccio =

Italian footballer (born 2002)

Personal information
- Date of birth: 6 February 2002 (age 24)
- Place of birth: Qualiano, Italy
- Height: 1.87 m (6 ft 2 in)
- Position: Centre-back

Team information
- Current team: Pogoń Szczecin
- Number: 4

Youth career
- –2016: Sport Village
- 2016–2021: Juventus

Senior career*
Years	Team	Apps	(Gls)
2021–2024	Juventus Next Gen (Note: The team's name was changed from Juventus U23 to Juventus Next Gen in August 2022.)	48	(1)
2023–2024	→ Modena (loan)	24	(0)
2024–2026	Sampdoria	43	(1)
2026–	Pogoń Szczecin	5	(1)

International career
2017	Italy U15	3	(0)
2017–2018	Italy U16	7	(0)
2018–2019	Italy U17	12	(0)
2019–2020	Italy U18	7	(0)
2021–2024	Italy U20	2	(0)
Medal record
Men's football
Representing Italy
UEFA European Under-17 Championship
Silver medal – second place	2019 Republic of Ireland
- * Club domestic league appearances and goals as of 21:16, 25 October 2026 (UTC)

Alessandro Pio Riccio (born 6 February 2002) is an Italian professional footballer who plays as a centre-back for Ekstraklasa club Pogoń Szczecin.

== Club career ==
Riccio started playing football at Sport Village, in Qualiano. In 2016, Riccio moved to Juventus. In the 2016–17 season, Riccio won the league with the under-15s. On 28 October 2020, Andrea Pirlo called up Riccio for a match against Barcelona. On 15 September 2021, Riccio made his debut for Juventus U23 in a 3–2 Coppa Italia Serie C win against Feralpisalò. On 31 October, during a match against Südtirol, he injured his zygomatic bone. His first match after this injury came on 18 December, in a 2–1 win against Legnago. On 17 February 2022, Riccio scored his first goal in his career with a header from a corner kick in a match eventually won 4–0 against Piacenza. On 29 April, he extended his contract at Juventus until 2024.

On 31 August 2023, Riccio renewed his contract with the club until 2025, and subsequently joined Serie B side Modena on a season-long loan.

On 28 August 2024, Riccio signed a three-year contract with Sampdoria in Serie B.

On 9 September 2026, Riccio moved to Polish club Pogoń Szczecin on a two-year contract, with an option to extend. He made his debut four days later, in a 2–0 league win over Wieczysta Kraków.

== International career ==
Riccio represented Italy internationally at under-15, under-16, under-17, under-18 and under-20 level.

He was called up the 2019 UEFA European Under-17 Championship losing 4–2 the final against Netherlands. He was also called up for the 2019 FIFA U-17 World Cup, where Italy were eliminated against Brazil in the quarter-finals.

== Career statistics ==
As of match played 9 September 2026

Appearances and goals by club, season and competition
Club	Season	League			National cup (Note: Includes Coppa Italia)		Other		Total	
Club	Season	Division	Apps	Goals	Apps	Goals	Apps	Goals	Apps	Goals
Juventus Next Gen	2021–22	Serie C	24	1	0	0	3 (Note: One appearance in Coppa Italia Serie C, two appearances in Serie C promotion play-offs)	0	27	1
Juventus Next Gen	2022–23	Serie C	24	0	0	0	7 (Note: Appearances in Coppa Italia Serie C)	0	16	0
Juventus Next Gen	Total		48	1	0	0	10	0	58	1
Modena (loan)	2023–24	Serie B	24	0	0	0	—		24	0
Sampdoria	2024–25	Serie B	26	1	0	0	2 (Note: Appearances in Serie B relegation play-outs)	0	28	1
Sampdoria	2025–26	Serie B	17	0	1	0	—		18	0
Sampdoria	Total		43	1	1	0	2	0	46	1
Pogoń Szczecin	2026–27	Ekstraklasa	1	0	—		—		1	0
Career total			116	2	1	0	12	0	129	2

== Honours ==
Italy U17

- UEFA European Under-17 Championship runner-up: 2019
