= Gennaro Tutino =

Italian footballer (born 1996)

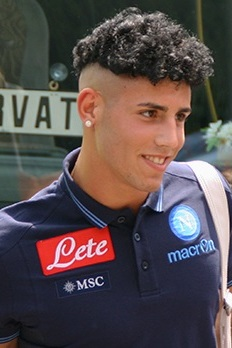
- Tutino with Napoli in 2015

Personal information
- Date of birth: 20 August 1996 (age 30)
- Place of birth: Naples, Italy
- Height: 1.77 m (5 ft 10 in)
- Position: Forward

Team information
- Current team: Sampdoria

Youth career
- 2001–2007: Juve Domizia
- 2008–2014: Napoli
- 2015–2016: → Avellino (loan)
- 2016: → Bari (loan)

Senior career*
Years	Team	Apps	(Gls)
2014–2022	Napoli	0	(0)
2014–2015	→ Vicenza (loan)	0	(0)
2015	→ Gubbio (loan)	11	(1)
2015–2016	→ Avellino (loan)	0	(0)
2016	→ Bari (loan)	1	(0)
2016–2017	→ Carrarese (loan)	13	(1)
2017–2018	→ Cosenza (loan)	27	(7)
2018	→ Carpi (loan)	0	(0)
2018–2019	→ Cosenza (loan)	34	(10)
2019–2020	→ Hellas Verona (loan)	6	(0)
2020	→ Empoli (loan)	16	(3)
2020–2021	→ Salernitana (loan)	36	(13)
2021–2022	→ Parma (loan)	27	(5)
2022–2024	Parma	17	(2)
2023	→ Palermo (loan)	18	(3)
2023–2024	→ Cosenza (loan)	35	(20)
2024–2025	Cosenza	0	(0)
2024–2025	→ Sampdoria (loan)	21	(5)
2025–	Sampdoria	0	(0)
2025–2026	→ Avellino (loan)	24	(1)

International career
2011–2012	Italy U16	9	(2)
2011–2013	Italy U17	31	(5)
2013–2014	Italy U18	7	(0)
Medal record
Men's football
Representing Italy
UEFA European Under-17 Championship
Silver medal – second place	2013 Slovakia
- * Club domestic league appearances and goals as of 20 July 2026

Gennaro Tutino (born 20 August 1996) is an Italian professional footballer who plays as a forward for Serie B club Sampdoria.

== Club career ==
Tutino began his career in the Napoli youth system, and became the captain of the Primavera side, with which he reached the 2013 Coppa Italia Primavera Final, only to lose out to rivals Juventus. He was promoted to the Napoli first team in 2012, although he did not appear with the squad.

On 22 July 2014, he signed with Vicenza on loan from Napoli for the 2014–15 season. However, after a negative spell in Vicenza, due to being ruled out for five months with an injury to the anterior cruciate ligament of his right knee, on 26 January 2015, he was sent on loan once again to Gubbio for the second half of the 2014–15 season.

On 15 July 2015, both Tutino and his young Napoli attacking teammate Roberto Insigne were sent on loan to Avellino with an option to buy.

On 28 January 2016, Tutino and his young Napoli teammate Jacopo Dezi were sent on loan to Bari with an option to buy for the second half of the 2015–16 season.

On 30 July 2016, he was sent on loan from Napoli to Carrarese for the 2016–17 season, along with fellow striker Simone Del Nero, who arrived from Massese.

On 21 July 2018, Tutino joined Serie B side Carpi on loan until 30 June 2019. On 3 August 2018, the loan was terminated and Tutino was permitted to return to Cosenza on loan, citing family reasons.

On 9 August 2019, Tutino joined Serie A club Hellas Verona on loan until 30 June 2020.

On 10 January 2020 he moved to Empoli on loan.

On 13 August 2021, Tutino joined Parma on a season-long loan with an obligation to buy.

On 18 January 2023, Palermo announced the signing of Tutino from Parma, on a loan deal with an option to buy.

On 21 July 2023, Tutino returned to Cosenza on loan with an obligation to buy.

On 1 August 2024, Tutino joined Sampdoria on loan with an obligation to buy, and signed a contract until 30 June 2028.

On 8 August 2025, Tutino moved to Avellino on loan, with an option to buy and an obligation to buy in case of Avellino's promotion to Serie A.

== International career ==
Gennaro Tutino has played for the Italian national U-16 team, Italian national U-17 team and the Italian national U18 team.

== Style of play ==
A right-footed player with good dribbling skills, Tutino is capable of playing as either a left or right winger or as a secondary striker but primarily plays on the right wing.

== Personal life ==
Gennaro Tutino is the cousin of Cosenza player Armando Anastasio.

== Honours ==
Italy U17

- UEFA European Under-17 Championship runner-up: 2013
