= List of Italian football transfers summer 2023 =

The 2023 Italian football summer transfer window ran from 1 July to 31 August 2023. This list includes transfers featuring at least one club from either Serie A or Serie B that were completed after the end of the 2022–23 season and before the end of the summer 2023 window on 31 August. Some contracts were already signed and announced before the window opening.

== Transfers ==
All players and clubs without a flag are Italian.

Legend

- Those clubs in Italic indicate that the player already left the team on loan on this or the previous season or a new signing that immediately left the club.

| Date | Name | Moving from | Moving to | Fee |
|---|---|---|---|---|
| 12 April 2023 | (Zimbabwe) Jordan Zemura | (England) Bournemouth | Udinese | Free |
| 26 April 2023 | (Brazil) Brenner | (United States) Cincinnati | Udinese | Undisclosed |
| 11 May 2023 | (Germany) Jeff Chabot | Sampdoria | (Germany) 1. FC Köln | Undisclosed (Note: The player already played for his new club in the 2022–23 season, the deal turned from temporary to definitive.) |
| 16 May 2023 | (Ivory Coast) Hamed Traorè | Sassuolo | (England) Bournemouth | Undisclosed |
| 31 May 2023 | (Austria) Stefan Posch | (Germany) TSG Hoffenheim | Bologna | Undisclosed |
| 8 June 2023 | (Romania) Mihai Popa | (Romania) Voluntari | Torino | Free |
| 9 June 2023 | (Spain) Josep Martínez | (Germany) Leipzig | Genoa | Undisclosed |
| 11 June 2023 | (Algeria) Houssem Aouar | (France) Lyon | Roma | Free |
| 14 June 2023 | (Poland) Sebastian Walukiewicz | Cagliari | Empoli | Undisclosed |
| 14 June 2023 | Alessandro Di Pardo | Juve NG | Cagliari | Undisclosed |
| 14 June 2023 | Lorenzo Carissoni | Latina | Cittadella | Free |
| 15 June 2023 | (Netherlands) Sam Lammers | Atalanta | (Scotland) Rangers | Undisclosed |
| 15 June 2023 | (Argentina) Giovanni Simeone | Verona | Napoli | Undisclosed |
| 16 June 2023 | (Serbia) Vanja Vlahović | (Serbia) Partizan | Atalanta | Undisclosed |
| 17 June 2023 | (Sweden) Dejan Kulusevski | Juventus | (England) Tottenham | €30M |
| 21 June 2023 | (Poland) Arkadiusz Milik | (France) OM | Juventus | €6.3M |
| 21 June 2023 | (France) Evan Ndicka | (Germany) Eintracht Frankfurt | Roma | Free |
| 21 June 2023 | (Bosnia and Herzegovina) Benjamin Tahirović | Roma | (Netherlands) Ajax | Undisclosed |
| 22 June 2023 | (Sweden) Pontus Almqvist | (Russia) Rostov | Lecce | Loan |
| 23 June 2023 | (Austria) Marko Božić | Frosinone | (Slovenia) Maribor | Undisclosed |
| 23 June 2023 | (Netherlands) Justin Kluivert | Roma | (England) Bournemouth | Undisclosed |
| 26 June 2023 | Fabio Lucioni | Lecce | Palermo | Undisclosed |
| 27 June 2023 | Jacopo Manconi | AlbinoLeffe | Modena | Free |
| 27 June 2023 | Andrea Tessiore | Triestina | Cittadella | Free |
| 27 June 2023 | Guglielmo Vicario | Empoli | (England) Tottenham | Undisclosed |
| 28 June 2023 | Marco Sportiello | Atalanta | Milan | Free |
| 28 June 2023 | (Colombia) Kevin Agudelo | Spezia | (United Arab Emirates) Al-Nasr | Undisclosed |
| 28 June 2023 | Filippo Delli Carri | Como | Padova | Undisclosed |
| 28 June 2023 | (Netherlands) Alessio da Cruz | (Belgium) Mechelen | Feralpisalò | Undisclosed |
| 29 June 2023 | (Romania) Răzvan Marin | Cagliari | Empoli | Loan |
| 29 June 2023 | (Spain) Oier Zarraga | (Spain) Athletic Bilbao | Udinese | Free |
| 29 June 2023 | Matteo Cotali | Frosinone | Modena | Free |
| 29 June 2023 | Filippo Missori | Roma | Sassuolo | Undisclosed |
| 29 June 2023 | Cristian Volpato | Roma | Sassuolo | Undisclosed |
| 29 June 2023 | (Poland) Aleksander Buksa | Genoa | (Austria) WSG Tirol | Loan |
| 30 June 2023 | Davide Veroli | Cagliari | Catanzaro | Loan |
| 30 June 2023 | (Croatia) Marin Pongračić | (Germany) Wolfsburg | Lecce | Undisclosed |
| 30 June 2023 | (Kosovo) Andi Hoti | Inter | (Germany) 1. FC Magdeburg | Undisclosed |
| 30 June 2023 | (England) Ruben Loftus-Cheek | (England) Chelsea | Milan | Undisclosed |
| 30 June 2023 | (Spain) Carles Pérez | Roma | (Spain) Celta | Undisclosed |
| 30 June 2023 | (Netherlands) Jay Idzes | (Netherlands) Go Ahead Eagles | Venezia | Free |
| 30 June 2023 | Giacomo Drago | Renate | Südtirol | Undisclosed |
| 30 June 2023 | (Spain) Pablo Marí | (England) Arsenal | Monza | Undisclosed |
| 1 July 2023 | (France) Marcus Thuram | (Germany) Borussia Mönchengladbach | Inter | Free |
| 1 July 2023 | (United States) Timothy Weah | (France) Lille | Juventus | Undisclosed |
| 1 July 2023 | Alberto Grassi | Parma | Empoli | Undisclosed |
| 1 July 2023 | Marco Pompetti | Inter | Catanzaro | Undisclosed |
| 1 July 2023 | Raoul Bellanova | Cagliari | Torino | Undisclosed |
| 1 July 2023 | (Slovenia) Nik Prelec | Cagliari | (Austria) WSG Tirol | Loan |
| 1 July 2023 | (Ghana) Ibrahim Sulemana | Verona | Cagliari | Undisclosed |
| 1 July 2023 | (Spain) Cristo González | Udinese | (Portugal) Arouca | Undisclosed |
| 1 July 2023 | (Portugal) Domingos Quina | (England) Watford | Udinese | Undisclosed |
| 1 July 2023 | Lorenzo Pirola | Inter | Salernitana | Undisclosed |
| 1 July 2023 | (Senegal) Boulaye Dia | (Spain) Villarreal | Salernitana | Undisclosed |
| 2 July 2023 | (Netherlands) Jayden Braaf | (Germany) Borussia Dortmund | Verona | Undisclosed |
| 2 July 2023 | (Croatia) Nikola Moro | (Russia) Dynamo Moscow | Bologna | Undisclosed |
| 3 July 2023 | (Croatia) Marcelo Brozović | Inter | (Saudi Arabia) Al Nassr | Undisclosed |
| 3 July 2023 | Sandro Tonali | Milan | (England) Newcastle | Undisclosed |
| 3 July 2023 | (Albania) Kevin Haveri | Rimini | Torino | Undisclosed |
| 3 July 2023 | (Argentina) Gonzalo Escalante | Lazio | (Spain) Cádiz | Undisclosed |
| 3 July 2023 | (Spain) Aarón Martín | (Germany) 1. FSV Mainz 05 | Genoa | Free |
| 3 July 2023 | (Georgia (country)) Giorgi Kvernadze | (Georgia (country)) Dinamo Batumi | Frosinone | Loan |
| 3 July 2023 | (The Gambia) Musa Juwara | Bologna | (Denmark) Vejle | Undisclosed |
| 3 July 2023 | (Netherlands) Denso Kasius | Bologna | (Netherlands) AZ Alkmaar | Undisclosed |
| 3 July 2023 | (Netherlands) Sam Beukema | (Netherlands) AZ Alkmaar | Bologna | Undisclosed |
| 4 July 2023 | (Brazil) Matheus Martins | Udinese | (England) Watford | Loan |
| 4 July 2023 | Mattia Zanotti | Inter | (Switzerland) St. Gallen | Loan |
| 4 July 2023 | Edoardo Sottini | Inter | Cittadella | Undisclosed |
| 4 July 2023 | Giorgio Cittadini | Atalanta | Monza | Loan |
| 4 July 2023 | Anthony Partipilo | Ternana | Parma | Undisclosed |
| 5 July 2023 | Armando Izzo | Torino | Monza | Undisclosed |
| 5 July 2023 | Daniele Sommariva | Pescara | Genoa | Undisclosed |
| 5 July 2023 | Nicola Leali | Ascoli | Genoa | Free |
| 5 July 2023 | Aljosa Vasic | Padova | Palermo | Undisclosed |
| 5 July 2023 | Francesco Amatucci | Montevarchi | Cittadella | Undisclosed |
| 5 July 2023 | Christian Sussi | Pisa | Fiorenzuola | Loan |
| 6 July 2023 | Davide Frattesi | Sassuolo | Inter | Loan |
| 6 July 2023 | Leonardo Mancuso | Monza | Palermo | Loan |
| 6 July 2023 | (Albania) Marvin Çuni | (Germany) Bayern II | Frosinone | Undisclosed |
| 6 July 2023 | (Nigeria) Cyriel Dessers | Cremonese | (Scotland) Rangers | Undisclosed |
| 6 July 2023 | (Argentina) Luka Romero | Lazio | Milan | Free |
| 6 July 2023 | (Bosnia and Herzegovina) Sead Kolašinac | (France) OM | Atalanta | Free |
| 6 July 2023 | Francesco Bardi | Bologna | Reggiana | Free |
| 7 July 2023 | (Netherlands) Mitchel Bakker | (Germany) Bayer Leverkusen | Atalanta | Undisclosed |
| 7 July 2023 | Lorenzo Lucca | Pisa | Udinese | Loan |
| 7 July 2023 | Matteo Angeli | Bologna | Cittadella | Undisclosed |
| 7 July 2023 | Nicola Rauti | Torino | Südtirol | Loan |
| 7 July 2023 | Pietro Ceccaroni | Venezia | Palermo | Undisclosed |
| 7 July 2023 | Samuele Mulattieri | Inter | Sassuolo | Undisclosed |
| 7 July 2023 | Roberto Gagliardini | Inter | Monza | Free |
| 7 July 2023 | Francesco Acerbi | Lazio | Inter | Undisclosed |
| 7 July 2023 | (The Gambia) Ebrima Darboe | Roma | (Austria) LASK | Loan |
| 7 July 2023 | Marco Brescianini | Milan | Frosinone | Undisclosed |
| 7 July 2023 | (Croatia) Marin Šverko | (Netherlands) Groningen | Venezia | Undisclosed |
| 7 July 2023 | Andrea Cisco | Pisa | Südtirol | Undisclosed |
| 8 July 2023 | Edoardo Pieragnolo | Sassuolo | Reggiana | Loan |
| 8 July 2023 | Filippo Romagna | Sassuolo | Reggiana | Loan |
| 8 July 2023 | Giacomo Satalino | Sassuolo | Reggiana | Loan |
| 8 July 2023 | (Germany) Lennart Czyborra | Genoa | (Netherlands) PEC Zwolle | Loan |
| 8 July 2023 | (Slovakia) Samuel Mráz | Spezia | (Greece) Volos | Undisclosed |
| 10 July 2023 | (Turkey) Mert Çetin | Verona | (Turkey) Ankaragücü | Loan |
| 10 July 2023 | (France) Michel Adopo | Torino | Atalanta | Free |
| 10 July 2023 | Fabio Borini | (Turkey) Fatih Karagümrük | Sampdoria | Free |
| 10 July 2023 | Matteo Ricci | Frosinone | Sampdoria | Undisclosed |
| 10 July 2023 | (Croatia) Filip Benković | Udinese | (Turkey) Trabzonspor | Loan |
| 10 July 2023 | Daniel Maldini | Milan | Empoli | Loan |
| 11 July 2023 | (Spain) Jordi Mboula | (Spain) Mallorca | Verona | Undisclosed |
| 11 July 2023 | (Czech Republic) Samuel Grygar | Inter | (Czech Republic) Baník Ostrava | Undisclosed |
| 12 July 2023 | Felice D'Amico | Sampdoria | Avellino | Undisclosed |
| 12 July 2023 | (Croatia) Adrian Šemper | Genoa | Como | Undisclosed |
| 12 July 2023 | (Denmark) Oliver Abildgaard | (Russia) Rubin Kazan | Como | Undisclosed |
| 12 July 2023 | (Austria) Marlon Mustapha | (Germany) 1. FSV Mainz 05 | Como | Undisclosed |
| 12 July 2023 | Manuel Peretti | Palermo | Recanatese | Undisclosed |
| 12 July 2023 | Roberto Insigne | Frosinone | Palermo | Undisclosed |
| 12 July 2023 | (Germany) Yann Aurel Bisseck | (Denmark) AGF | Inter | Undisclosed |
| 12 July 2023 | Mattia Viti | (France) Nice | Sassuolo | Loan |
| 12 July 2023 | Alessandro Russo | Sassuolo | Trento | Loan |
| 12 July 2023 | Vincenzo Millico | Cagliari | Ascoli | Free |
| 12 July 2023 | Simone D'Uffizi | Viterbese | Ascoli | Undisclosed |
| 12 July 2023 | (Croatia) Toni Fruk | Fiorentina | (Croatia) Rijeka | Undisclosed |
| 12 July 2023 | (Canada) Sebastian Breza | Bologna | (Switzerland) Yverdon | Undisclosed |
| 13 July 2023 | Raffaele Di Gennaro | Gubbio | Inter | Free |
| 13 July 2023 | Matteo Grandi | Sangiuliano | Venezia | Free |
| 13 July 2023 | (Serbia) Mladen Devetak | Palermo | (Croatia) Istra | Loan |
| 13 July 2023 | (United States) Christian Pulisic | (England) Chelsea | Milan | Undisclosed |
| 13 July 2023 | (Netherlands) Abdou Harroui | Sassuolo | Frosinone | Undisclosed |
| 13 July 2023 | Riccardo Marchizza | Sassuolo | Frosinone | Undisclosed |
| 13 July 2023 | Stefano Turati | Sassuolo | Frosinone | Loan |
| 13 July 2023 | (Romania) Daniel Boloca | Frosinone | Sassuolo | Undisclosed |
| 13 July 2023 | Andrea Oliveri | Atalanta | Catanzaro | Loan |
| 13 July 2023 | Tommaso Cassandro | Lecce | Como | Undisclosed |
| 14 July 2023 | (Slovenia) Tjaš Begić | Vicenza | Parma | Undisclosed |
| 14 July 2023 | Riccardo Ciervo | Sassuolo | Südtirol | Loan |
| 14 July 2023 | Davide Merola | Empoli | Pescara | Loan |
| 14 July 2023 | (Denmark) Jacob Rasmussen | Fiorentina | (Denmark) Brøndby | Undisclosed |
| 14 July 2023 | Alessandro Bianco | Fiorentina | Reggiana | Loan |
| 14 July 2023 | Lorenzo Venuti | Fiorentina | Lecce | Free |
| 14 July 2023 | Giorgio Savini | Torino | Novara | Loan |
| 14 July 2023 | (Albania) Kevin Haveri | Torino | Ascoli | Loan |
| 14 July 2023 | (Uruguay) Martín Satriano | Inter | (France) Brest | Loan |
| 14 July 2023 | Simone Scuffet | (Romania) Cluj | Cagliari | Undisclosed |
| 14 July 2023 | Gabriele Bellodi | Milan | Olbia | Undisclosed |
| 14 July 2023 | (France) Etienne Camara | (England) Huddersfield | Udinese | Undisclosed |
| 14 July 2023 | (Denmark) Rasmus Kristensen | (England) Leeds United | Roma | Loan |
| 14 July 2023 | Federico Bergonzi | Atalanta | Feralpisalò | Loan |
| 14 July 2023 | Fabiano Parisi | Empoli | Fiorentina | Undisclosed |
| 14 July 2023 | Filippo Nardi | Cremonese | Reggiana | Loan |
| 14 July 2023 | Ilario Monterisi | Lecce | Frosinone | Undisclosed |
| 15 July 2023 | (Argentina) Valentín Carboni | Inter | Monza | Loan |
| 15 July 2023 | Alessio Cragno | Monza | Sassuolo | Loan |
| 15 July 2023 | (Czech Republic) Jakub Jankto | (Spain) Getafe | Cagliari | Undisclosed |
| 15 July 2023 | Roberto Pierno | Lecce | Pescara | Loan |
| 15 July 2023 | Mattia Scaringi | Cremonese | Novara | Loan |
| 15 July 2023 | Davide Barosi | Juve Stabia | Ascoli | Undisclosed |
| 15 July 2023 | (Croatia) Antonio Čolak | (Scotland) Rangers | Parma | Undisclosed |
| 15 July 2023 | Nikola Sekulov | Juventus | Cremonese | Loan |
| 15 July 2023 | Mattia Compagnon | Juventus | Feralpisalò | Loan |
| 16 July 2023 | Giuseppe Ciocci | Cagliari | Pescara | Loan |
| 16 July 2023 | (Belgium) Tibo Persyn | Inter | (Netherlands) Eindhoven | Undisclosed |
| 16 July 2023 | Stefano Minelli | Cesena | Feralpisalò | Loan |
| 16 July 2023 | Marco Nasti | Milan | Bari | Loan |
| 17 July 2023 | Francesco Zallu | Cagliari | Olbia | Loan |
| 17 July 2023 | Luigi Palomba | Cagliari | Olbia | Loan |
| 17 July 2023 | Nicolò Cavuoti | Cagliari | Olbia | Loan |
| 17 July 2023 | Paolo Gozzi | Genoa | (France) Red Star | Loan |
| 17 July 2023 | Luca Moro | Sassuolo | Spezia | Loan |
| 17 July 2023 | (Spain) Raúl Moro | Lazio | (Spain) Valladolid | Loan |
| 17 July 2023 | Nicolò Evangelisti | Empoli | Pineto | Loan |
| 17 July 2023 | Filippo Ranocchia | Juventus | Empoli | Loan |
| 17 July 2023 | Alessandro Arena | Gubbio | Pisa | Undisclosed |
| 18 July 2023 | (South Korea) Kim Min-jae | Napoli | (Germany) Bayern Munich | Undisclosed |
| 18 July 2023 | Gianluca Contini | Cagliari | Olbia | Loan |
| 18 July 2023 | Antonio Barreca | Cagliari | Sampdoria | Undisclosed |
| 18 July 2023 | Tommaso Augello | Sampdoria | Cagliari | Undisclosed |
| 18 July 2023 | (Portugal) Leonardo Buta | Udinese | (Portugal) Gil Vicente | Loan |
| 18 July 2023 | Francesco Cassata | Genoa | Spezia | Loan |
| 18 July 2023 | (Tunisia) Hamza Rafia | Pescara | Lecce | Undisclosed |
| 18 July 2023 | Antonio Palumbo | Ternana | Modena | Undisclosed |
| 19 July 2023 | (Netherlands) Tijjani Reijnders | (Netherlands) AZ Alkmaar | Milan | Undisclosed |
| 19 July 2023 | Giacomo Manzari | Sassuolo | Ascoli | Loan |
| 19 July 2023 | Niccolò Squizzato | Inter | Pescara | Undisclosed |
| 19 July 2023 | (Switzerland) Darian Males | Inter | (Switzerland) Young Boys | Undisclosed |
| 19 July 2023 | (Colombia) Juan Cuadrado | Juventus | Inter | Free |
| 19 July 2023 | (Portugal) André Duarte | (Romania) U Craiova | Reggiana | Free |
| 19 July 2023 | Filippo Costa | Napoli | Vicenza | Undisclosed |
| 19 July 2023 | (Sweden) Zinedin Smajlovic | (Sweden) Täby | Lecce | Undisclosed |
| 19 July 2023 | (Serbia) Sergej Milinković-Savić | Lazio | (Saudi Arabia) Al Hilal | Undisclosed |
| 19 July 2023 | (France) Jérémy Ménez | Reggina | Bari | Free |
| 19 July 2023 | Stefano Girelli | Cremonese | Sampdoria | Undisclosed |
| 19 July 2023 | Lorenzo Masetti | Pisa | Arezzo | Undisclosed |
| 20 July 2023 | (Brazil) Rodrigo Becão | Udinese | (Turkey) Fenerbahçe | Undisclosed |
| 20 July 2023 | (Cameroon) André Onana | Inter | (England) Manchester United | Undisclosed |
| 20 July 2023 | Gaetano Oristanio | Inter | Cagliari | Loan |
| 20 July 2023 | (Morocco) Oussama El Azzouzi | (Belgium) Union SG | Bologna | Undisclosed |
| 20 July 2023 | (Denmark) Christian Gytkjaer | Monza | Venezia | Free |
| 20 July 2023 | Leonardo Candellone | Napoli | Juve Stabia | Undisclosed |
| 20 July 2023 | William Rovida | Inter | Pro Patria | Loan |
| 20 July 2023 | Andrea Moretti | Inter | Pro Patria | Loan |
| 20 July 2023 | Tommaso Barbieri | Juventus | Pisa | Loan |
| 20 July 2023 | (Albania) Erdis Kraja | Atalanta | Ascoli | Loan |
| 21 July 2023 | (Argentina) Taty Castellanos | (United States) NYCFC | Lazio | Undisclosed |
| 21 July 2023 | Andrea Bertolacci | (Turkey) Karagümrük | Cremonese | Free |
| 21 July 2023 | Alessio Brambilla | Cesena | Cremonese | Undisclosed |
| 21 July 2023 | (Ghana) Emmanuel Gyasi | Empoli | Spezia | Undisclosed |
| 21 July 2023 | Filippo Bandinelli | Empoli | Spezia | Undisclosed |
| 21 July 2023 | Riccardo Saponara | Fiorentina | Verona | Free |
| 21 July 2023 | Gennaro Tutino | Atalanta | Cosenza | Loan |
| 22 July 2023 | (Switzerland) Noah Okafor | (Austria) Salzburg | Milan | Undisclosed |
| 22 July 2023 | (Brazil) Arthur | Juventus | Fiorentina | Loan |
| 22 July 2023 | (Argentina) Facundo Colidio | Milan | (Argentina) River Plate | Undisclosed |
| 22 July 2023 | Michele Collocolo | Ascoli | Cremonese | Undisclosed |
| 22 July 2023 | Tommaso Fantacci | Empoli | Monterosi | Undisclosed |
| 22 July 2023 | Gabriele Ferrarini | Fiorentina | Feralpisalò | Loan |
| 22 July 2023 | Federico Zuccon | Atalanta | Cosenza | Loan |
| 22 July 2023 | Simone Mazzocchi | Atalanta | Cosenza | Loan |
| 23 July 2023 | (Serbia) Aleksa Terzić | Fiorentina | (Austria) Salzburg | Undisclosed |
| 23 July 2023 | (Cameroon) Adrien Tameze | Verona | Torino | Undisclosed |
| 23 July 2023 | Erik Gerbi | Sampdoria | Lumezzane | Loan |
| 24 July 2023 | Marco Sala | Sassuolo | Como | Undisclosed |
| 24 July 2023 | Elia Caprile | Bari | Napoli | Undisclosed |
| 24 July 2023 | Elia Caprile | Napoli | Empoli | Loan |
| 24 July 2023 | Antonio Vergara | Napoli | Reggiana | Loan |
| 25 July 2023 | Simone Romagnoli | Lecce | Frosinone | Undisclosed |
| 25 July 2023 | Alessio Rizza | Empoli | Cittadella | Undisclosed |
| 25 July 2023 | (Ivory Coast) Ben Lhassine Kone | Torino | Como | Loan |
| 25 July 2023 | (Belgium) Christian Kabasele | (England) Watford | Udinese | Undisclosed |
| 25 July 2023 | (Ivory Coast) Jérémie Boga | Atalanta | (France) Nice | Undisclosed |
| 25 July 2023 | Matteo Gabbia | Milan | (Spain) Villarreal | Loan |
| 25 July 2023 | (Norway) Martin Palumbo | Udinese | Juve NG | Undisclosed |
| 26 July 2023 | (Brazil) Igor | Fiorentina | (England) Brighton | Undisclosed |
| 26 July 2023 | (France) Abdoulaye Touré | Genoa | (France) Le Havre | Undisclosed |
| 26 July 2023 | Mateo Retegui | (Argentina) Boca Juniors | Genoa | Undisclosed |
| 26 July 2023 | Edoardo Borrelli | Ostia Mare | Catanzaro | Undisclosed |
| 27 July 2023 | (Romania) Ionuț Radu | Inter | (England) Bournemouth | Loan |
| 27 July 2023 | Edoardo Pierozzi | Fiorentina | Cesena | Loan |
| 27 July 2023 | Wladimiro Falcone | Sampdoria | Lecce | Undisclosed |
| 27 July 2023 | Simone Panada | Atalanta | Sampdoria | Undisclosed |
| 27 July 2023 | (Nigeria) Samuel Chukwueze | (Spain) Villarreal | Milan | Undisclosed |
| 27 July 2023 | (Uzbekistan) Eldor Shomurodov | Roma | Cagliari | Loan |
| 27 July 2023 | Francesco Galuppini | Südtirol | Mantova | Undisclosed |
| 28 July 2023 | (Greece) Giorgos Kyriakopoulos | Sassuolo | Monza | Loan |
| 28 July 2023 | (England) Luis Binks | Bologna | (England) Coventry City | Loan |
| 29 July 2023 | (Mali) El Bilal Touré | (Spain) Almería | Atalanta | Loan |
| 30 July 2023 | (United States) Bryan Reynolds | Roma | (Belgium) Westerlo | Undisclosed |
| 31 July 2023 | (France) Benoît Costil | (France) Lille | Salernitana | Free |
| 31 July 2023 | (Uruguay) Matías Viña | Roma | Sassuolo | Loan |
| 31 July 2023 | (Croatia) Ante Rebić | Milan | (Turkey) Beşiktaş | Undisclosed |
| 31 July 2023 | Giuseppe Pezzella | Parma | Empoli | Undisclosed |
| 31 July 2023 | Stefano Gori | Juventus | Monza | Loan |
| 31 July 2023 | Bruno Martella | Ternana | Feralpisalò | Loan |
| 31 July 2023 | (France) Florian Ayé | Brescia | (France) Auxerre | Undisclosed |
| 1 August 2023 | Luca D'Andrea | Sassuolo | Catanzaro | Loan |
| 1 August 2023 | (Portugal) João Ferreira | (England) Watford | Udinese | Loan |
| 1 August 2023 | (Norway) Morten Thorsby | (Germany) Union Berlin | Genoa | Loan |
| 1 August 2023 | Francesco Pio Esposito | Inter | Spezia | Loan |
| 1 August 2023 | Mirko Antonucci | Cittadella | Spezia | Undisclosed |
| 1 August 2023 | (Denmark) Emil Kornvig | Spezia | Cittadella | Undisclosed |
| 2 August 2023 | Danilo D'Ambrosio | Inter | Monza | Free |
| 2 August 2023 | Alessandro Mercati | Sassuolo | Gubbio | Loan |
| 2 August 2023 | (Turkey) Mert Müldür | Sassuolo | (Turkey) Fenerbahçe | Undisclosed |
| 2 August 2023 | (Portugal) Miguel Veloso | Verona | Pisa | Free |
| 3 August 2023 | (Argentina) Gino Infantino | (Argentina) Rosario Central | Fiorentina | Undisclosed |
| 3 August 2023 | Manolo Portanova | Genoa | Reggiana | Loan |
| 3 August 2023 | Luca Vido | Atalanta | Reggiana | Undisclosed |
| 3 August 2023 | Claudio Cassano | Roma | Cittadella | Undisclosed |
| 3 August 2023 | (Portugal) Tomás Esteves | (Portugal) Porto | Pisa | Undisclosed |
| 3 August 2023 | Romano Floriani Mussolini | Lazio | Pescara | Loan |
| 4 August 2023 | (Spain) Gonzalo Villar | Roma | (Spain) Granada | Undisclosed |
| 4 August 2023 | (Colombia) Yerry Mina | (England) Everton | Fiorentina | Free |
| 4 August 2023 | (Japan) Daichi Kamada | (Germany) Eintracht Frankfurt | Lazio | Free |
| 4 August 2023 | (Albania) Ylber Ramadani | (Scotland) Aberdeen | Lecce | Undisclosed |
| 4 August 2023 | (United States) Yunus Musah | (Spain) Valencia | Milan | Undisclosed |
| 4 August 2023 | (Brazil) Gabriel Brazão | Inter | Ternana | Loan |
| 4 August 2023 | (Germany) Lukas Mühl | Austria Wien | Spezia | Free |
| 4 August 2023 | (Hungary) Krisztofer Horváth | Torino | (Hungary) Kecskeméti | Loan |
| 5 August 2023 | (Colombia) Devis Vásquez | Milan | (England) Sheffield Wednesday | Loan |
| 5 August 2023 | (Denmark) Rasmus Højlund | Atalanta | (England) Manchester United | Undisclosed |
| 5 August 2023 | (Brazil) Rogério | Sassuolo | (Germany) VfL Wolfsburg | Undisclosed |
| 5 August 2023 | Lorenzo Lucchesi | Fiorentina | Ternana | Loan |
| 5 August 2023 | Costantino Favasuli | Fiorentina | Ternana | Loan |
| 5 August 2023 | Christian Tommasini | Pisa | Pescara | Undisclosed |
| 5 August 2023 | Alessandro Livieri | Pisa | Catania | Loan |
| 5 August 2023 | (Albania) Stiven Shpendi | Cesena | Empoli | 2-year loan |
| 7 August 2023 | (Switzerland) Yann Sommer | (Germany) Bayern Munich | Inter | Undisclosed |
| 7 August 2023 | (Brazil) Natan | (Brazil) Bragantino | Napoli | Undisclosed |
| 7 August 2023 | (Sweden) John Björkengren | Lecce | (Denmark) Randers | Undisclosed |
| 7 August 2023 | (France) Marley Aké | Juventus | Udinese | Loan |
| 7 August 2023 | Marco D'Alessandro | Monza | Pisa | Loan |
| 7 August 2023 | Gianluca Scamacca | (England) West Ham | Atalanta | Undisclosed |
| 7 August 2023 | Marco Somma | Sampdoria | Pro Patria | Undisclosed |
| 7 August 2023 | (Argentina) Tiago Casasola | Perugia | Ternana | Undisclosed |
| 7 August 2023 | (Poland) Jakub Łabojko | Brescia | Ternana | Free |
| 7 August 2023 | Giuseppe Cuomo | Crotone | Südtirol | Undisclosed |
| 8 August 2023 | Valerio Mantovani | Salernitana | Ternana | Undisclosed |
| 8 August 2023 | Marco Curto | Südtirol | Como | Loan |
| 8 August 2023 | Marco Bleve | Lecce | Carrarese | Loan |
| 8 August 2023 | Luca Lipani | Genoa | Sassuolo | Undisclosed |
| 8 August 2023 | (Uruguay) Facundo González | (Spain) Valencia | Juventus | Undisclosed |
| 8 August 2023 | (Denmark) Gustav Isaksen | (Denmark) Midtjylland | Lazio | Undisclosed |
| 8 August 2023 | (Croatia) Nikola Vlašić | (England) West Ham | Torino | Undisclosed |
| 8 August 2023 | Emiliano Viviano | (Turkey) Karagümrük | Ascoli | Free |
| 8 August 2023 | Roberto Ogunseye | Modena | Cesena | Undisclosed |
| 8 August 2023 | Andrea La Mantia | SPAL | Feralpisalò | Loan |
| 9 August 2023 | Alessandro Fontanarosa | Inter | Cosenza | Loan |
| 9 August 2023 | (Slovakia) David Strelec | Spezia | (Slovakia) Slovan Bratislava | Loan |
| 9 August 2023 | Filippo Distefano | Fiorentina | Ternana | Loan |
| 9 August 2023 | Duccio Degli Innocenti | Empoli | Lecco | Loan |
| 10 August 2023 | (Sweden) Jens Cajuste | (France) Reims | Napoli | Undisclosed |
| 10 August 2023 | (Poland) Mateusz Praszelik | Verona | Cosenza | Loan |
| 10 August 2023 | Federico Bonazzoli | Salernitana | Verona | Loan |
| 10 August 2023 | Francesco Mezzoni | Napoli | Perugia | Loan |
| 10 August 2023 | Antonio Raimondo | Bologna | Ternana | Loan |
| 10 August 2023 | (Iceland) Andri Baldursson | Bologna | (Sweden) Elfsborg | Loan |
| 10 August 2023 | (Angola) M'Bala Nzola | Spezia | Fiorentina | Undisclosed |
| 10 August 2023 | (Denmark) Oliver Christensen | (Germany) Hertha BSC | Fiorentina | Undisclosed |
| 10 August 2023 | (Brazil) Arthur Cabral | Fiorentina | (Portugal) Benfica | Undisclosed |
| 10 August 2023 | (Brazil) Roger Ibañez | Roma | (Saudi Arabia) Al Ahli | Undisclosed |
| 10 August 2023 | Emil Audero | Sampdoria | Inter | Loan |
| 10 August 2023 | (Spain) Pablo Rodríguez | Lecce | Ascoli | Loan |
| 10 August 2023 | (Denmark) Andreas Jungdal | Milan | Cremonese | Undisclosed |
| 10 August 2023 | (Argentina) Gonzalo Abrego | (Argentina) Godoy Cruz | Cremonese | Loan |
| 10 August 2023 | Alessandro Caporale | Virtus Francavilla | Lecco | Undisclosed |
| 10 August 2023 | Luca Pandolfi | Cosenza | Cittadella | Undisclosed |
| 10 August 2023 | Alfredo Donnarumma | Ternana | Catanzaro | Loan |
| 10 August 2023 | (Iceland) Birkir Bjarnason | (Norway) Viking | Brescia | Free |
| 11 August 2023 | (Spain) Estanis Pedrola | (Spain) Barcelona Atlètic | Sampdoria | Loan |
| 11 August 2023 | Joshua Tenkorang | Cremonese | Lecco | Loan |
| 11 August 2023 | (Serbia) Filip Stanković | Inter | Sampdoria | Loan |
| 11 August 2023 | (Brazil) Junior Messias | Milan | Genoa | Loan |
| 11 August 2023 | (Belgium) Koni De Winter | Juventus | Genoa | Loan |
| 11 August 2023 | Manuel Marras | Bari | Cosenza | Undisclosed |
| 11 August 2023 | Stefano Pettinari | Ternana | Reggiana | Undisclosed |
| 11 August 2023 | Alessandro Sersanti | Juve NG | Lecco | Undisclosed |
| 11 August 2023 | Andrea Silipo | Palermo | Monterosi | Undisclosed |
| 12 August 2023 | Michele Rigione | Cosenza | Avellino | Undisclosed |
| 12 August 2023 | (Bulgaria) Andrea Hristov | Cosenza | Potenza | Loan |
| 12 August 2023 | (Denmark) Joakim Mæhle | Atalanta | (Germany) VfL Wolfsburg | Loan |
| 12 August 2023 | (Romania) Andrei Mărginean | Sassuolo | Ternana | Loan |
| 13 August 2023 | Christian Travaglini | Cagliari | Ternana | Loan |
| 14 August 2023 | (Switzerland) Dan Ndoye | (Switzerland) Basel | Bologna | Undisclosed |
| 14 August 2023 | Michele Cerofolini | Fiorentina | Frosinone | Undisclosed |
| 14 August 2023 | (France) Mohamed Kaba | (France) Valenciennes | Lecce | Undisclosed |
| 14 August 2023 | (Switzerland) Denis Zakaria | Juventus | Monaco | €20M |
| 14 August 2023 | (Argentina) Lucas Beltrán | (Argentina) River Plate | Fiorentina | Undisclosed |
| 14 August 2023 | (Serbia) Nemanja Matić | Roma | (France) Rennais | Undisclosed |
| 14 August 2023 | (Romania) Adrian Rus | Pisa | (Cyprus) Pafos | Loan |
| 14 August 2023 | (Portugal) Leandro Sanca | Spezia | (Portugal) Chaves | Undisclosed |
| 15 August 2023 | Federico Ceccherini | Verona | (Turkey) Karagümrük | Loan |
| 15 August 2023 | Kevin Lasagna | Verona | (Turkey) Karagümrük | Loan |
| 15 August 2023 | (Argentina) Enzo Barrenechea | Juventus | Frosinone | Loan |
| 15 August 2023 | Davide Diaw | Monza | Bari | Loan |
| 15 August 2023 | (Brazil) Carlos Augusto | Monza | Inter | Loan |
| 15 August 2023 | (Germany) Robin Gosens | Inter | (Germany) Union Berlin | Loan |
| 15 August 2023 | Andrea Favilli | Genoa | Ternana | Loan |
| 15 August 2023 | (Ivory Coast) Emmanuel Latte Lath | Atalanta | (England) Middlesbrough | Undisclosed |
| 16 August 2023 | (Austria) Marko Arnautović | Bologna | Inter | Loan |
| 16 August 2023 | (Netherlands) Jerdy Schouten | Bologna | (Netherlands) PSV | Undisclosed |
| 16 August 2023 | Michael Folorunsho | Napoli | Verona | Loan |
| 16 August 2023 | Ivan Saio | Sampdoria | Brindisi | Loan |
| 16 August 2023 | (The Gambia) Assan Ceesay | Lecce | (Saudi Arabia) Damac | Undisclosed |
| 16 August 2023 | Nicolò Rovella | Juventus | Lazio | 2-year loan |
| 16 August 2023 | Matteo Cancellieri | Lazio | Empoli | Loan |
| 16 August 2023 | (Portugal) Luís Maximiano | Lazio | (Spain) Almería | Loan |
| 16 August 2023 | (Serbia) Uroš Račić | (Spain) Valencia | Sassuolo | Undisclosed |
| 16 August 2023 | (Portugal) Renato Sanches | (France) PSG | Roma | Loan |
| 16 August 2023 | (Argentina) Leandro Paredes | (France) PSG | Roma | Undisclosed |
| 17 August 2023 | (Ivory Coast) Wilfried Singo | Torino | Monaco | Undisclosed |
| 17 August 2023 | (Finland) Niklas Pyyhtiä | Bologna | Ternana | Loan |
| 17 August 2023 | Luca Pellegrini | Juventus | Lazio | 2-year loan |
| 17 August 2023 | (Jamaica) Trivante Stewart | (Jamaica) Mount Pleasant | Salernitana | Undisclosed |
| 17 August 2023 | (Nigeria) Chukwubuikem Ikwuemesi | (Slovenia) Celje | Salernitana | Undisclosed |
| 17 August 2023 | Nicola Mosti | Modena | Virtus Entella | Loan |
| 17 August 2023 | (France) Malcom Edjouma | (Romania) FCSB | Bari | Loan |
| 18 August 2023 | Filippo Sgarbi | Perugia | Cosenza | Loan |
| 18 August 2023 | (Montenegro) Nikola Krstović | (Slovakia) Dunajská Streda | Lecce | Undisclosed |
| 18 August 2023 | (Romania) Louis Munteanu | Fiorentina | (Romania) Farul Constanța | Loan |
| 18 August 2023 | (Poland) Mateusz Łęgowski | (Poland) Pogoń Szczecin | Salernitana | Undisclosed |
| 18 August 2023 | Marco Olivieri | Juventus | Venezia | Loan |
| 18 August 2023 | (Zambia) Kingstone Mutandwa | (Zambia) Atletico Lusaka | Cagliari | Undisclosed |
| 18 August 2023 | (Spain) Txus Alba | (Spain) Barcelona B | Ternana | Undisclosed |
| 18 August 2023 | (Croatia) Roko Vukušić | (Croatia) RNK Split | Modena | Free |
| 18 August 2023 | (Netherlands) Ryan Flamingo | Sassuolo | (Croatia) Utrecht | Loan |
| 19 August 2023 | Mattia Viviani | Benevento | Cosenza | Loan |
| 19 August 2023 | (Greece) Ilias Koutsoupias | Benevento | Bari | Loan |
| 19 August 2023 | (Ukraine) Ruslan Malinovskyi | (France) OM | Genoa | Loan |
| 19 August 2023 | Davide Agazzi | Ternana | Benevento | Undisclosed |
| 20 August 2023 | Giovanni Fabbian | Inter | Bologna | Undisclosed |
| 20 August 2023 | (Morocco) Walid Cheddira | Bari | Napoli | Undisclosed |
| 20 August 2023 | (Morocco) Walid Cheddira | Napoli | Frosinone | Loan |
| 20 August 2023 | (Croatia) Stanko Jurić | Parma | (Spain) Valladolid | Loan |
| 21 August 2023 | Alfonso Sepe | Sampdoria | Alessandria | Loan |
| 21 August 2023 | Matteo Stoppa | Sampdoria | Catanzaro | Loan |
| 21 August 2023 | Christian Acella | Cremonese | Perugia | Loan |
| 21 August 2023 | Simone Guerra | Feralpisalò | Juve NG | Undisclosed |
| 21 August 2023 | Patrick Enrici | Lecco | Taranto | Undisclosed |
| 21 August 2023 | (Denmark) Kristoffer Lund | (Sweden) Häcken | Palermo | Undisclosed |
| 21 August 2023 | Andrea Barberis | Monza | Pisa | Free |
| 21 August 2023 | (Croatia) Lorenco Šimić | Ascoli | (Israel) Maccabi Haifa | Undisclosed |
| 22 August 2023 | Sebastiano Esposito | Inter | Sampdoria | Loan |
| 22 August 2023 | (France) Christ Mukelenge | (France) PSG | Bologna | Free |
| 22 August 2023 | (Algeria) Mehdi Léris | Sampdoria | Stoke City | Undisclosed |
| 22 August 2023 | (Poland) Bartosz Bereszyński | Sampdoria | Empoli | Loan |
| 22 August 2023 | (Norway) Marcus Holmgren Pedersen | (Netherlands) Feyenoord | Sassuolo | Loan |
| 22 August 2023 | (Argentina) Marco Pellegrino | (Argentina) Platense | Milan | Undisclosed |
| 22 August 2023 | Gregorio Luperini | Perugia | Ternana | Undisclosed |
| 23 August 2023 | (Switzerland) Valentino Lazaro | Inter | Torino | Undisclosed |
| 23 August 2023 | (Sweden) Jesper Karlsson | (Netherlands) AZ Alkmaar | Bologna | Undisclosed |
| 23 August 2023 | Mattia Pagliuca | Bologna | Alessandria | Loan |
| 23 August 2023 | Andrea Mazia | Bologna | Brindisi | Loan |
| 23 August 2023 | Gianluigi Sueva | Cosenza | Lucchese | Undisclosed |
| 23 August 2023 | Lorenzo Di Stefano | Sampdoria | Lecco | Undisclosed |
| 23 August 2023 | (Uruguay) Facundo González | Juventus | Sampdoria | Loan |
| 23 August 2023 | (Slovenia) Petar Stojanović | Empoli | Sampdoria | Loan |
| 23 August 2023 | (Germany) Suat Serdar | (Germany) Hertha BSC | Verona | Loan |
| 23 August 2023 | (Belgium) Mats Lemmens | Lecce | Lecco | Loan |
| 23 August 2023 | Davide Guglielmotti | Reggiana | Lecco | Undisclosed |
| 23 August 2023 | (United States) Andrija Novakovich | Venezia | Lecco | Loan |
| 23 August 2023 | Nicolò Armini | Lazio | Potenza | Undisclosed |
| 23 August 2023 | (Netherlands) Reda Boultam | Salernitana | (Slovenia) Olimpija Ljubljana | Undisclosed |
| 23 August 2023 | (Moldova) Andrei Moțoc | Salernitana | Legnago | Loan |
| 23 August 2023 | Mattia Valoti | Monza | Pisa | Loan |
| 23 August 2023 | Emanuele Zuelli | Pisa | Carrarese | Loan |
| 23 August 2023 | (Georgia (country)) Iva Gelashvili | (Georgia (country)) Dinamo Batumi | Spezia | Loan |
| 23 August 2023 | (Slovenia) Luka Krajnc | (Germany) Hannover 96 | Catanzaro | Loan |
| 24 August 2023 | (France) Noha Lemina | (France) PSG | Sampdoria | Loan |
| 24 August 2023 | Ciro Panico | Cosenza | Taranto | Undisclosed |
| 24 August 2023 | Alex Sposito | Sangiuliano | Reggiana | Free |
| 24 August 2023 | (Cape Verde) Jovane Cabral | (Portugal) Sporting | Salernitana | Loan |
| 24 August 2023 | Nunzio Lella | Cagliari | Venezia | Undisclosed |
| 24 August 2023 | Giorgio Altare | Cagliari | Venezia | Loan |
| 24 August 2023 | (Serbia) Marko Lazetić | Milan | (Portugal) Sporting | Loan |
| 24 August 2023 | Matteo Campani | Sassuolo | Pisa | Undisclosed |
| 24 August 2023 | (Nigeria) Maduka Okoye | (England) Watford | Udinese | Undisclosed |
| 24 August 2023 | (Lithuania) Edgaras Dubickas | Pisa | Catania | Loan |
| 25 August 2023 | Simone Verdi | Torino | Como | Undisclosed |
| 25 August 2023 | Nicolò Cambiaghi | Atalanta | Empoli | Loan |
| 25 August 2023 | (Ukraine) Viktor Kovalenko | Atalanta | Empoli | Loan |
| 25 August 2023 | Giacomo Faticanti | Roma | Lecce | Undisclosed |
| 25 August 2023 | Pietro Rovaglia | Ternana | Juve Stabia | Loan |
| 25 August 2023 | Samuele Spalluto | Fiorentina | Monopoli | Undisclosed |
| 25 August 2023 | (Argentina) Joaquín Correa | Inter | (France) OM | Loan |
| 25 August 2023 | Luigi Sepe | Salernitana | Lazio | Loan |
| 25 August 2023 | Antonio Iervolino | Salernitana | Vis Pesaro | Loan |
| 25 August 2023 | (Argentina) Agustín Martegani | (Argentina) San Lorenzo | Salernitana | Loan |
| 25 August 2023 | Eddie Salcedo | Inter | (Spain) Eldense | Loan |
| 25 August 2023 | (Bosnia and Herzegovina) Dario Šarić | Palermo | (Turkey) Antalyaspor | Loan |
| 26 August 2023 | (Chile) Alexis Sánchez | (France) OM | Inter | Free |
| 26 August 2023 | Giovanni Corradini | Fiorentina | Spezia | Undisclosed |
| 26 August 2023 | Marco Perrotta | Bari | Padova | Undisclosed |
| 26 August 2023 | Marco Bertini | Lazio | SPAL | Loan |
| 26 August 2023 | (Ivory Coast) Jean-Daniel Akpa Akpro | Lazio | Monza | Loan |
| 26 August 2023 | (Iran) Sardar Azmoun | (Germany) Bayer Leverkusen | Roma | Loan |
| 27 August 2023 | Massimo Coda | Genoa | Cremonese | Loan |
| 27 August 2023 | Mario Sampirisi | Monza | Reggiana | Undisclosed |
| 27 August 2023 | (Spain) Raúl Asencio | Cittadella | Potenza | Undisclosed |
| 27 August 2023 | (Algeria) Ahmed Touba | (Turkey) İstanbul Başakşehir | Lecce | Loan |
| 27 August 2023 | Carlo Ilari | Lecco | Lumezzane | Loan |
| 27 August 2023 | Gianluca Frabotta | Juventus | Bari | Loan |
| 27 August 2023 | (Slovenia) Jan Mlakar | (Croatia) Hajduk Split | Pisa | Undisclosed |
| 28 August 2023 | Luca Fiordilino | Venezia | Feralpisalò | Loan |
| 28 August 2023 | (Scotland) Liam Henderson | Empoli | Palermo | Loan |
| 28 August 2023 | (Argentina) Matías Soulé | Juventus | Frosinone | Loan |
| 28 August 2023 | (Spain) Pol Lirola | (France) OM | Frosinone | Loan |
| 28 August 2023 | (France) Rémi Oudin | (France) Bordeaux | Lecce | Undisclosed |
| 28 August 2023 | Giuseppe Mastinu | Pisa | Torres | Undisclosed |
| 28 August 2023 | Vittorio Parigini | Genoa | Feralpisalò | Undisclosed |
| 28 August 2023 | Gabriele Gori | Fiorentina | Avellino | Undisclosed |
| 29 August 2023 | Flavio Paoletti | Sampdoria | (Turkey) Karagümrük | Undisclosed |
| 29 August 2023 | (Suriname) Ridgeciano Haps | Venezia | Genoa | Loan |
| 29 August 2023 | (Norway) Julian Kristoffersen | Salernitana | Ancona | Undisclosed |
| 29 August 2023 | (Brazil) Beto | Udinese | (England) Everton | Undisclosed |
| 29 August 2023 | (Poland) Mateusz Wieteska | (France) Clermont | Cagliari | Undisclosed |
| 29 August 2023 | (Brazil) Kaio Jorge | Juventus | Frosinone | Loan |
| 29 August 2023 | (Albania) Etrit Berisha | Torino | Empoli | Undisclosed |
| 29 August 2023 | Marco Armellino | Modena | Avellino | Undisclosed |
| 29 August 2023 | Lorenzo Palmisani | Frosinone | Olbia | Loan |
| 29 August 2023 | Pierluigi Frattali | Bari | Frosinone | Undisclosed |
| 29 August 2023 | Federico Dionisi | Ascoli | Ternana | Undisclosed |
| 29 August 2023 | (North Macedonia) Ilija Nestorovski | Udinese | Ascoli | Free |
| 29 August 2023 | (Sweden) Joel Voelkerling Persson | Lecce | (Netherlands) Vitesse | Loan |
| 29 August 2023 | (Denmark) Jesper Lindstrøm | (Germany) Eintracht Frankfurt | Napoli | Undisclosed |
| 29 August 2023 | Michele Besaggio | Genoa | Brescia | Undisclosed |
| 30 August 2023 | (Denmark) Victor Kristiansen | (England) Leicester | Bologna | Loan |
| 30 August 2023 | (Belgium) Alexis Saelemaekers | Milan | Bologna | Loan |
| 30 August 2023 | (Croatia) Luka Bogdan | Ternana | Ascoli | Loan |
| 30 August 2023 | Francesco Di Tacchio | Südtirol | Ascoli | Loan |
| 30 August 2023 | (Lithuania) Marius Adamonis | Lazio | Perugia | Loan |
| 30 August 2023 | (Croatia) Marko Pajač | Genoa | Reggiana | Loan |
| 30 August 2023 | (Turkey) Emirhan İlkhan | Torino | (Turkey) İstanbul Başakşehir | Loan |
| 30 August 2023 | (France) Benjamin Pavard | (Germany) Bayern Munich | Inter | Undisclosed |
| 30 August 2023 | (Portugal) André Duarte | Reggiana | (Croatia) Osijek | Loan |
| 30 August 2023 | (Ivory Coast) Cedric Gondo | Cremonese | Reggiana | Loan |
| 30 August 2023 | Umberto Saracco | Audace Cerignola | Lecco | Loan |
| 30 August 2023 | Luca Marrone | Monza | Lecco | Free |
| 30 August 2023 | Andrea Petagna | Monza | Cagliari | Loan |
| 31 August 2023 | Lorenzo Dickmann | SPAL | Brescia | Loan |
| 31 August 2023 | Jacopo De Matteis | Salernitana | Messina | Undisclosed |
| 31 August 2023 | Francesco Orlando | Salernitana | Taranto | Undisclosed |
| 31 August 2023 | (France) Brian Bayeye | Torino | Ascoli | Loan |
| 31 August 2023 | (Georgia (country)) Saba Sazonov | (Russia) Dynamo Moscow | Torino | Undisclosed |
| 31 August 2023 | (Belgium) Jackson Tchatchoua | (Belgium) Charleroi | Verona | Loan |
| 31 August 2023 | (Belgium) Romelu Lukaku | (England) Chelsea | Roma | Loan |
| 31 August 2023 | (Turkey) Berkan Kutlu | (Turkey) Galatasaray | Genoa | Loan |
| 31 August 2023 | (France) Matteo Guendouzi | (France) OM | Lazio | Loan |
| 31 August 2023 | (France) Brandon Soppy | Atalanta | Torino | Loan |
| 31 August 2023 | Roberto Piccoli | Atalanta | Lecce | Undisclosed |
| 31 August 2023 | Federico Di Francesco | Lecce | Palermo | Undisclosed |
| 31 August 2023 | (Morocco) Youssef Maleh | Lecce | Empoli | Loan |
| 31 August 2023 | (Iceland) Þórir Jóhann Helgason | Lecce | (Germany) Eintracht Braunschweig | Loan |
| 31 August 2023 | (Austria) Emanuel Aiwu | Cremonese | (England) Birmingham | Loan |
| 31 August 2023 | (Bulgaria) Valentin Antov | Monza | Cremonese | Loan |
| 31 August 2023 | (Poland) Przemysław Szymiński | Frosinone | Reggiana | Loan |
| 31 August 2023 | (Sweden) Emil Holm | Spezia | Atalanta | Loan |
| 31 August 2023 | (France) Loum Tchaouna | (France) Rennais | Salernitana | Undisclosed |
| 31 August 2023 | Riccardo Calafiori | (Switzerland) Basel | Bologna | Undisclosed |
| 31 August 2023 | Gianluca Di Chiara | Reggina | Parma | Free |
| 31 August 2023 | Alexis Ferrante | Ternana | Benevento | Loan |
| 31 August 2023 | (France) Karim Zedadka | Napoli | (Luxembourg) Swift Hesper | Undisclosed |
| 31 August 2023 | Salvatore Santoro | Pisa | Pro Vercelli | Loan |
| 31 August 2023 | (Senegal) Assan Seck | Pisa | Fiorenzuola | Loan |
| 31 August 2023 | (Argentina) Franco Vezzoni | Inter | Foggia | Undisclosed |
| 1 September 2023 | (The Gambia) Ebrima Colley | Atalanta | (Switzerland) Young Boys | Loan |
| 1 September 2023 | Leonardo Bonucci | Juventus | (Germany) Union Berlin | Free |
| 1 September 2023 | (Greece) Christos Mandas | (Greece) Ofi Crete | Lazio | Undisclosed |
| 1 September 2023 | (Denmark) Thomas Kristensen | (Denmark) AGF | Udinese | Undisclosed |
| 1 September 2023 | Lorenzo Colombo | Milan | Monza | Loan |
| 1 September 2023 | Caleb Okoli | Atalanta | Frosinone | Loan |
| 1 September 2023 | (Brazil) Reinier Jesus | (Spain) Real Madrid | Frosinone | Loan |
| 1 September 2023 | (Moldova) Artur Ioniță | Pisa | Lecco | Loan |
| 1 September 2023 | Emanuel Vignato | Bologna | Pisa | Undisclosed |
| 1 September 2023 | (Senegal) Mamadou Coulibaly | Salernitana | Palermo | Loan |
| 1 September 2023 | (Croatia) Marko Pjaca | Juventus | (Croatia) Rijeka | Loan |
| 1 September 2023 | (Brazil) Marcos Antônio | Lazio | (Greece) PAOK | Loan |
| 1 September 2023 | (Spain) Samu Castillejo | (Spain) Valencia | Sassuolo | Loan |
| 1 September 2023 | (France) Maxime Lopez | Sassuolo | Fiorentina | Loan |
| 1 September 2023 | (Serbia) Luka Jović | Fiorentina | Milan | Undisclosed |
| 1 September 2023 | (Colombia) Duván Zapata | Sampdoria | Torino | Loan |
| 1 September 2023 | (Germany) Arijon Ibrahimović | (Germany) Bayern Munich | Frosinone | Loan |
| 1 September 2023 | (Morocco) Mehdi Bourabia | Spezia | Frosinone | Undisclosed |
| 1 September 2023 | Gennaro Borrelli | Frosinone | Brescia | Loan |
| 1 September 2023 | Luigi Canotto | Frosinone | Cosenza | Loan |
| 1 September 2023 | (Netherlands) Davy Klaassen | (Netherlands) Ajax | Inter | Undisclosed |
| 1 September 2023 | (Greece) Nikos Botis | Inter | Monopoli | Loan |
| 1 September 2023 | (Slovakia) Tomáš Suslov | (Netherlands) Groningen | Verona | Loan |
| 1 September 2023 | (Republic of Ireland) James Abankwah | Udinese | (England) Charlton | Undisclosed |
| 1 September 2023 | (Croatia) Antonio Tikvic | (Germany) Bayern Munich | Udinese | Undisclosed |
| 1 September 2023 | (England) Keinan Davis | (England) Aston Villa | Udinese | Undisclosed |
| 1 September 2023 | (Argentina) Martín Payero | (England) Middlesbrough | Udinese | Undisclosed |
| 1 September 2023 | (Argentina) Nicolás Domínguez | Bologna | (England) Nottingham Forest | Loan |
| 1 September 2023 | (Switzerland) Remo Freuler | (England) Nottingham Forest | Bologna | Loan |
| 1 September 2023 | (Greece) Pantelis Chatzidiakos | (Netherlands) AZ Alkmaar | Cagliari | Undisclosed |
| 1 September 2023 | (Greece) Christos Kourfalidis | Cagliari | Feralpisalò | Loan |
| 1 September 2023 | (Morocco) Sofyan Amrabat | Fiorentina | (England) Manchester United | Loan |
| 1 September 2023 | (Mexico) Hirving Lozano | Napoli | (Netherlands) PSV | Undisclosed |
| 1 September 2023 | Giovanni Crociata | Empoli | Lecco | Undisclosed |
| 1 September 2023 | Simone Bastoni | Spezia | Empoli | Loan |
| 1 September 2023 | Francesco Forte | Ascoli | Cosenza | Loan |
| 1 September 2023 | Tommaso Milanese | Cremonese | Ascoli | Loan |
| 1 September 2023 | (Slovenia) Žan Majer | Reggina | Cremonese | Free |
| 1 September 2023 | Alessandro Mattioli | Cittadella | Vis Pesaro | Undisclosed |
| 1 September 2023 | Gian Filippo Felicioli | Cittadella | Pergolettese | Undisclosed |
| 1 September 2023 | (Guinea-Bissau) Carlos Embaló | Cittadella | Foggia | Undisclosed |
| 1 September 2023 | (Belgium) Divock Origi | Milan | (England) Nottingham Forest | Loan |
| 1 September 2023 | (Senegal) Fodé Ballo-Touré | Milan | (England) Fulham | Loan |
| 1 September 2023 | (France) Janis Antiste | Sassuolo | Reggiana | Loan |
| 1 September 2023 | (Slovenia) Domen Črnigoj | Venezia | Reggiana | Loan |
| 1 September 2023 | Jacopo Da Riva | Atalanta | Reggiana | Loan |
| 1 September 2023 | Salvatore Elia | Atalanta | Spezia | Undisclosed |
| 1 September 2023 | Filippo Melegoni | Genoa | Reggiana | Loan |
| 1 September 2023 | Andrea Vallocchia | Reggiana | Triestina | Undisclosed |
| 1 September 2023 | Andrea Arrighini | Reggiana | AlbinoLeffe | Undisclosed |
| 1 September 2023 | (Spain) Jony Rodríguez | Lazio | (Spain) Cartagena | Free |
| 1 September 2023 | (France) Michaël Cuisance | Venezia | (Germany) VfL Osnabrück | Loan |
| 1 September 2023 | (United States) Jack de Vries | Venezia | Vis Pesaro | Loan |
| 1 September 2023 | Gaetano Letizia | Benevento | Feralpisalò | Loan |
| 1 September 2023 | Matteo Rossetti | Bari | Vis Pesaro | Undisclosed |
| 1 September 2023 | Emanuele Polverino | Bari | Vis Pesaro | Undisclosed |
| 1 September 2023 | Andrea Astrologo | Vis Pesaro | Bari | Undisclosed |
| 1 September 2023 | Alessandro Farroni | Vis Pesaro | Bari | Loan |
| 1 September 2023 | (France) Aurélien Scheidler | Bari | Andorra | Loan |
| 1 September 2023 | Andrea D'Errico | Bari | Crotone | Loan |
| 1 September 2023 | Gennaro Acampora | Benevento | Bari | Loan |
| 1 September 2023 | Mattia Aramu | Genoa | Bari | Loan |
| 1 September 2023 | (Morocco) Ismail Achik | Audace Cerignola | Bari | Undisclosed |
| 1 September 2023 | (Denmark) Julius Beck | Spezia | (Denmark) AGF | Loan |
| 1 September 2023 | Daniele Montevago | Sampdoria | Gubbio | Loan |
| 2 September 2023 | (Norway) Ola Solbakken | Roma | (Greece) Olympiacos | Loan |
| 4 September 2023 | (Switzerland) Nicolas Haas | Empoli | (Switzerland) Luzern | Loan |
| 4 September 2023 | (Uruguay) Joaquín Sosa | Bologna | (Croatia) Dinamo Zagreb | Loan |
| 4 September 2023 | Michele Camporese | Unattached | Feralpisalò | Loan |
| 5 September 2023 | (The Gambia) Musa Barrow | Bologna | (Saudi Arabia) Taawoun FC | Undisclosed |
| 6 September 2023 | Armando Anastasio | Monza | Casertana | Loan |
| 6 September 2023 | Mirko Carretta | Südtirol | Casertana | Undisclosed |
| 6 September 2023 | (Algeria) Mohamed Farès | Lazio | Brescia | Loan |
| 6 September 2023 | Marco Pissardo | Unattached | Bari | Free |
| 7 September 2023 | Daniele Celiento | Bari | Casertana | Loan |
| 7 September 2023 | (Colombia) Yeferson Paz | Sassuolo | Perugia | Loan |
