= 2023–24 UC Sampdoria season =

UC Sampdoria
2023–24 season
- Manager: Andrea Pirlo
- Stadium: Stadio Luigi Ferraris
- Serie B: 7th
- Coppa Italia: Round of 32
- Top goalscorer: League: Manuel De Luca (10); All: Manuel De Luca (10)
- Average home league attendance: 22,536

The 2023–24 season was UC Sampdoria's 78th season in existence and the club's first season in the second division of Italian football. In addition to the domestic league, UC Sampdoria participated in this season's edition of the Coppa Italia. The season covers the period from 1 July 2023 to 30 June 2024.

== Players ==
=== First-team squad ===
As of 1 September 2023

Note: Flags indicate national team as defined under FIFA eligibility rules; some limited exceptions apply. Players may hold more than one non-FIFA nationality.

No.	Pos.	Nation	Player
1	GK	SRB	Filip Stanković (on loan from Inter)
3	DF	ITA	Antonio Barreca
4	MF	ENG	Ronaldo Vieira
5	MF	NOR	Kristoffer Askildsen
6	MF	ITA	Simone Panada (on loan from Atalanta)
7	FW	ITA	Sebastiano Esposito (on loan from Inter Milan)
8	MF	ITA	Matteo Ricci
9	FW	ITA	Manuel De Luca
10	MF	ITA	Valerio Verre
11	FW	ESP	Estanis Pedrola (on loan from Barcelona)
13	DF	ITA	Andrea Conti
14	MF	SUI	Pajtim Kasami
16	FW	ITA	Fabio Borini
17	MF	ITA	Lorenzo Malagrida
20	FW	ITA	Antonino La Gumina

No.	Pos.	Nation	Player
21	DF	ITA	Simone Giordano
22	GK	ITA	Nicola Ravaglia
23	DF	ITA	Fabio Depaoli
25	DF	ITA	Alex Ferrari
28	MF	ESP	Gerard Yepes
29	DF	ITA	Nicola Murru
32	MF	ITA	Stefano Girelli
33	DF	URU	Facundo González (on loan from Juventus)
35	MF	GEQ	Hugo Buyla
40	DF	SLO	Petar Stojanović (on loan from Empoli)
46	DF	ITA	Giovanni Leoni (on loan from Padova)
77	FW	ITA	Marco Delle Monache
80	MF	ITA	Leonardo Benedetti
87	DF	ITA	Daniele Ghilardi (on loan from Hellas Verona)
92	MF	FRA	Noha Lemina (on loan from Paris Saint-Germain)

=== Out on loan ===
Note: Flags indicate national team as defined under FIFA eligibility rules; some limited exceptions apply. Players may hold more than one non-FIFA nationality.

No.	Pos.	Nation	Player
—	GK	ITA	Emil Audero (at Inter Milan until 30 June 2024)
—	GK	ITA	Matteo Raspa (at Sestri Levante until 30 June 2024)
—	GK	ITA	Ivan Saio (at Brindisi until 30 June 2024)
—	DF	POL	Bartosz Bereszyński (at Empoli until 30 June 2024)
—	DF	ALB	Ertijon Gega (at Alessandria until 30 June 2024)

No.	Pos.	Nation	Player
—	MF	ITA	Alfonso Sepe (at Alessandria until 30 June 2024)
—	MF	ITA	Mattia Vitale (at Cerignola until 30 June 2024)
—	FW	ITA	Erik Gerbi (at Lumezzane until 30 June 2024)
—	FW	ITA	Daniele Montevago (at Gubbio until 30 June 2024)
—	FW	ITA	Matteo Stoppa (at Catanzaro until 30 June 2024)

== Transfers ==
=== In ===
Pos.	Player	Transferred from	Fee	Date	Source

=== Out ===
Pos.	Player	Transferred to	Fee	Date	Source

== Competitions ==
=== Overview ===
Competition	First match	Last match	Starting round	Final position	Record							
Competition	First match	Last match	Starting round	Final position	Pld	W	D	L	GF	GA	GD	Win %
Serie B	19 August 2023	10 May 2024	Matchday 1	7th	38	16	9	13	53	50	+3	42.11
Promotion play-offs	17 May 2024	17 May 2024	Preliminary round	Preliminary round	1	0	0	1	0	2	−2	0.00
Coppa Italia	14 August 2023	31 October 2023	Round of 64	Round of 32	2	0	1	1	1	5	−4	0.00
Total					41	16	10	15	54	57	−3	39.02

Last updated: 17 May 2024
Source: Competitions

=== Serie B ===
==== League table ====
Pos	Team	Pld	W	D	L	GF	GA	GD	Pts	Promotion, qualification or relegation
5	Catanzaro	38	17	9	12	59	50	+9	60	Qualification for promotion play-offs preliminary round
6	Palermo	38	15	11	12	62	53	+9	56	Qualification for promotion play-offs preliminary round
7	Sampdoria (Note: Sampdoria were deducted 2 points due to failure in paying taxes between January and March 2023.)	38	16	9	13	53	50	+3	55	Qualification for promotion play-offs preliminary round
8	Brescia	38	12	15	11	44	40	+4	51	Qualification for promotion play-offs preliminary round
9	Cosenza	38	11	14	13	47	42	+5	47 (Note: Head-to-head points: Cosenza 11, Modena 11, Reggiana 7, Südtirol 3. Head-to-head goal difference: Cosenza +6, Modena +2.)	

Source: Soccerway (in English)
Rules for classification: 1) Points; 2) Head-to-head points; 3) Head-to-head goal difference; 4) Goal difference; 5) Goals scored; 6) Draw.
(Note: Head-to-head record is used only after all the matches between the teams in question have been played)

==== Results summary ====
Overall								Home						Away					
Pld	W	D	L	GF	GA	GD	Pts	W	D	L	GF	GA	GD	W	D	L	GF	GA	GD
38	16	9	13	53	50	+3	55	7	4	8	25	25	0	9	5	5	28	25	+3

Last updated: 17 May 2024.

==== Results by round ====
Round	1	2	3	4	5	6	7	8	9	10	11	12	13	14	15	16	17	18	19	20	21	22	23	24	25	26	27	28	29	30	31	32	33	34	35	36	37	38
Ground	A	H	H	A	H	A	A	H	A	H	A	H	A	H	A	H	A	H	H	A	H	A	H	A	H	A	H	A	H	A	H	A	H	A	H	A	H	A
Result	W	L	L	D	L	D	L	L	D	W	L	W	W	W	L	W	W	L	D	L	L	W	D	L	D	W	L	W	W	W	W	D	L	D	D	W	W	W
Position	7	13	16	16	17	17	18	20	20	17	18	16	15	13	14	10	10	10	10	13	15	14	14	15	15	14	15	12	9	7	7	8	8	8	8	7	7	7

Updated to match(es) played on 17 May 2024. Source:
A = Away; H = Home; W = Win; D = Draw; L = Loss

==== Matches ====
The league fixtures were unveiled on 11 July 2023.

19 August 2023 1	Ternana	1–2	Sampdoria	Terni
20:30 CEST (UTC+2)	Proietti (yellow card) 40'; Celli (yellow card) 60'; Distefano 90+1'; Bogdan (yellow card) 90+5'	Report	La Gumina 5' (pen.); Depaoli 77'; Verre (yellow card) 90'	Stadium: Stadio Libero Liberati; Referee: Davide Di Marco

25 August 2023 2	Sampdoria	0–2	Pisa	Genoa
20:30 CEST (UTC+2)	Ferrari (yellow card) 36'	Report	Tramoni 14'; Arena 59', (yellow card) 82'; Nícolas (yellow card) 67'; Jureškin (yellow card) 90+1'; Calabresi (yellow card) 90+6'	Stadium: Stadio Luigi Ferraris; Referee: Giacomo Camplone

30 August 2023 3	Sampdoria	1–2	Venezia	Genoa
20:30 CEST (UTC+2)				Stadium: Stadio Luigi Ferraris

3 September 2023 4	Cremonese	1–1	Sampdoria	Cremona
18:30 CEST (UTC+2)				Stadium: Stadio Giovanni Zini

18 September 2023 5	Sampdoria	1–2	Cittadella	Genoa
20:30 CEST (UTC+2)				Stadium: Stadio Luigi Ferraris

24 September 2023 6	Parma	1–1	Sampdoria	Parma
16:15 CEST (UTC+2)				Stadium: Stadio Ennio Tardini

27 September 2023 7	Como	1–0	Sampdoria	Como
20:30 CEST (UTC+2)				Stadium: Stadio Giuseppe Sinigaglia

1 October 2023 8	Sampdoria	1–2	Catanzaro	Genoa
16:15 CEST (UTC+2)	Borini 34' (pen.)		Vandeputte 36'; Brignola 45'	Stadium: Stadio Luigi Ferraris

7 October 2023 9	Ascoli	1–1	Sampdoria	Ascoli Piceno
16:15 CEST (UTC+2)	Nestorovski 45+4'		Borini 51' (pen.)	Stadium: Stadio Cino e Lillo Del Duca

22 October 2023 10	Sampdoria	2–0	Cosenza	Genoa
16:15 CEST (UTC+2)	Borini 61' (pen.), 82'			Stadium: Stadio Luigi Ferraris

28 October 2023 11	Südtirol	3–1	Sampdoria	Bolzano
14:00 CEST (UTC+2)	Merkaj 78'; Casiraghi 90+5' (pen.); Pecorino 90+9'		González 53'	Stadium: Stadio Druso

4 November 2023 12	Sampdoria	1–0	Palermo	Genoa
16:15 CET (UTC+1)	Borini (penalty missed) 44', 44'			Stadium: Stadio Luigi Ferraris

11 November 2023 13	Modena	0–2	Sampdoria	Modena
CET (UTC+1)				Stadium: Stadio Alberto Braglia

24 November 2023 14	Sampdoria	2–1	Spezia	Genoa
CET (UTC+1)				Stadium: Stadio Luigi Ferraris

3 December 2023 15	Brescia	3–1	Sampdoria	Brescia
CET (UTC+1)				Stadium: Stadio Mario Rigamonti

9 December 2023 16	Sampdoria	2–0	Lecco	Genoa
CET (UTC+1)				Stadium: Stadio Luigi Ferraris

16 December 2023 17	Reggiana	1–2	Sampdoria	Reggio Emilia
CET (UTC+1)				Stadium: Mapei Stadium – Città del Tricolore

23 December 2023 18	Sampdoria	2–3	Feralpisalò	Genoa
CET (UTC+1)				Stadium: Stadio Luigi Ferraris

26 December 2023 19	Sampdoria	1–1	Bari
CET (UTC+1)

14 January 2024 20	Venezia	5–3	Sampdoria
CET (UTC+1)

19 January 2024 21	Sampdoria	0–3	Parma
CET (UTC+1)

28 January 2024 22	Cittadella	1–2	Sampdoria
CET (UTC+1)

3 February 2024 23	Sampdoria	2–2	Modena

10 February 2024 24	Pisa	2–0	Sampdoria

17 February 2024 25	Sampdoria	1–1	Brescia

23 February 2024 26	Cosenza	1–2	Sampdoria

27 February 2024 27	Sampdoria	1–2	Cremonese

3 March 2024 28	FeralpiSalò	1–3	Sampdoria

11 March 2024 29	Sampdoria	2–1	Ascoli

16 March 30	Bari	0–1	Sampdoria

1 April 2024 31	Sampdoria	4–1	Ternana

6 April 2024 32	Palermo	2–2	Sampdoria

13 April 2024 33	Sampdoria	0–1	Südtirol

20 April 2024 34	Spezia	0–0	Sampdoria

27 April 2024 35	Sampdoria	1–1	Como

1 May 2024 36	Lecco	0–1	Sampdoria

4 May 2024 37	Sampdoria	1–0	Reggiana

10 May 2024 38	Catanzaro	1–3	Sampdoria

==== Promotion play-offs ====
17 May 2024 Preliminary round	Palermo	2–0	Sampdoria	Palermo
20:30				Stadium: Stadio Renzo Barbera

=== Coppa Italia ===
14 August 2023 First Round	Sampdoria	1–1 (a.e.t.) (7–6 p)	Südtirol	Genoa
18:00 CEST (UTC+2)	Léris 17'; Ferrari (yellow card) 32'	Report	Giorgini (yellow card) 36'; Rover (yellow card) 45+1'; Casiraghi 45+4'	Stadium: Stadio Luigi Ferraris; Attendance: 10,948; Referee: Kevin Bonacina
	Penalties
	Stoppa (penalty scored); De Luca (penalty scored); Pedrola (penalty scored); Depaoli (penalty missed); Vieira (penalty scored); Bereszyński (penalty scored); Benedetti (penalty scored); Murru (penalty scored)		(penalty scored) Merkaj; (penalty scored) Lonardi; (penalty scored) Ciervo; (penalty scored) Cisco; (penalty missed) Broh; (penalty scored) Davi; (penalty scored) Tait; (penalty missed) Masiello

31 October 2023 Second Round	Salernitana	4–0	Sampdoria	Salerno
18:00 CET (UTC+1)	Ikwuemesi 28'; Tchaouna 45+1', 67'; Cabral 86'	Report	Giordano (yellow card) 44'; Depaoli (yellow card) 53'; Ghilardi (yellow card) 69'	Stadium: Stadio Arechi; Attendance: 4,740; Referee: Gianluca Manganiello

== Squad statistics ==
As of match played 17 May 2024

=== Appearances and goals ===
No.	Pos	Nat	Player	Total		Serie B		Promotion Play-offs		Coppa Italia	
No.	Pos	Nat	Player	Apps	Goals	Apps	Goals	Apps	Goals	Apps	Goals
1	GK	(Serbia) SRB	Filip Stanković	38	0	37	0	1	0	0	0
2	DF	(Italy) ITA	Cristiano Piccini	11	0	7+3	0	1	0	0	0
3	MF	(Italy) ITA	Antonio Barreca	23	0	14+8	0	0+1	0	0	0
4	MF	(England) ENG	Ronaldo Vieira	14	0	8+5	0	0	0	0+1	0
5	MF	(Norway) NOR	Kristoffer Askildsen	19	0	3+15	0	0	0	1	0
7	FW	(Italy) ITA	Sebastiano Esposito	23	6	18+4	6	1	0	0	0
8	MF	(Italy) ITA	Matteo Ricci	21	0	10+9	0	1	0	1	0
9	FW	(Italy) ITA	Manuel De Luca	35	10	22+10	10	1	0	1+1	0
10	MF	(Italy) ITA	Valerio Verre	26	1	23+2	1	0	0	1	0
11	FW	(Spain) ESP	Estanis Pedrola	16	3	8+7	3	0	0	0+1	0
13	DF	(Italy) ITA	Andrea Conti	2	0	0+1	0	0	0	0+1	0
14	MF	(Switzerland) SUI	Pajtim Kasami	30	5	24+3	5	0+1	0	0+2	0
16	FW	(Italy) ITA	Fabio Borini	23	9	16+6	9	1	0	0	0
19	FW	(Uruguay) URU	Agustín Álvarez	14	1	9+5	1	0	0	0	0
20	FW	(Italy) ITA	Antonino La Gumina	14	2	4+8	2	0	0	2	0
21	DF	(Italy) ITA	Simone Giordano	31	2	21+7	2	1	0	2	0
22	GK	(Italy) ITA	Nicola Ravaglia	3	0	1	0	0	0	2	0
23	DF	(Italy) ITA	Fabio Depaoli	35	4	27+5	4	1	0	2	0
25	DF	(Italy) ITA	Alex Ferrari	4	0	3	0	0	0	1	0
28	MF	(Spain) ESP	Gerard Yepes	36	0	32+2	0	1	0	1	0
29	DF	(Italy) ITA	Nicola Murru	24	1	21+2	1	0	0	1	0
32	MF	(Italy) ITA	Stefano Girelli	18	0	3+14	0	0	0	1	0
33	DF	(Uruguay) URU	Facundo González	30	2	26+2	2	1	0	1	0
35	MF	(Equatorial Guinea) GEQ	Hugo Buyla	1	0	0	0	0	0	0+1	0
39	MF	(Italy) ITA	Francesco Conti	1	0	0+1	0	0	0	0	0
40	DF	(Slovenia) SLO	Petar Stojanović	29	1	20+8	1	0+1	0	0	0
43	FW	(Democratic Republic of the Congo) COD	Samuel Ntanda-Lukisa	9	0	0+9	0	0	0	0	0
45	MF	(Italy) ITA	Gabriele Alesi	1	0	0+1	0	0	0	0	0
55	MF	(The Gambia) GAM	Ebrima Darboe	14	2	12+2	2	0	0	0	0
80	MF	(Italy) ITA	Leonardo Benedetti	16	1	5+9	1	0+1	0	1	0
87	DF	(Italy) ITA	Daniele Ghilardi	40	2	35+2	2	1	0	1+1	0
Players away on loan:
14	FW	(Italy) ITA	Matteo Stoppa	1	0	0+1	0	0	0	0	0
24	DF	(Poland) POL	Bartosz Bereszyński	2	0	1	0	0	0	0+1	0
77	FW	(Italy) ITA	Marco Delle Monache	8	0	0+6	0	0	0	1+1	0
Players who appeared for Sampdoria but left during the season:
6	MF	(Italy) ITA	Simone Panada	4	0	0+3	0	0	0	1	0
37	MF	(Algeria) ALG	Mehdi Léris	1	1	0	0	0	0	1	1
92	MF	(France) FRA	Noha Lemina	1	0	0+1	0	0	0	0	0

=== Goal scorers ===
Place	Position	Nation	Number	Name	Serie B	Promotion Play-offs	Coppa Italia	Total
1	FW	(Italy)	9	Manuel De Luca	10	0	0	10
2	FW	(Italy)	16	Fabio Borini	9	0	0	9
3	FW	(Italy)	7	Sebastiano Esposito	6	0	0	6
4	MF	(Switzerland)	14	Pajtim Kasami	5	0	0	5
5	DF	(Italy)	23	Fabio Depaoli	4	0	0	4
6	FW	(Spain)	11	Estanis Pedrola	3	0	0	3
7	FW	(Italy)	20	Antonino La Gumina	2	0	0	2
7	DF	(Italy)	21	Simone Giordano	2	0	0	2
7	DF	(Uruguay)	33	Facundo González	2	0	0	2
7	MF	(The Gambia)	55	Ebrima Darboe	2	0	0	2
7	DF	(Italy)	87	Daniele Ghilardi	2	0	0	2
12	MF	(Italy)	10	Valerio Verre	1	0	0	1
12	FW	(Uruguay)	19	Agustín Álvarez	1	0	0	1
12	DF	(Italy)	29	Nicola Murru	1	0	0	1
12	DF	(Slovenia)	40	Petar Stojanović	1	0	0	1
12	MF	(Italy)	80	Leonardo Benedetti	1	0	0	1
12	MF	(Algeria)	37	Mehdi Léris	0	0	1	1
12				Own goal	1	0	0	1
Total					53	0	1	54

=== Clean sheets ===
Place	Position	Nation	Number	Name	Serie B	Promotion Play-offs	Coppa Italia	Total
1	GK	(Serbia)	1	Filip Stanković	8	0	0	8
Total					8	0	0	8

=== Disciplinary record ===
Number	Nation	Position	Name	Serie B		Promotion Play-offs		Coppa Italia		Total	
Number	Nation	Position	Name	Yellow card	Red card	Yellow card	Red card	Yellow card	Red card	Yellow card	Red card
3	(Italy)	DF	Antonio Barreca	3	0	0	0	0	0	3	0
4	(England)	MF	Ronaldo Vieira	3	0	0	0	0	0	3	0
5	(Norway)	MF	Kristoffer Askildsen	1	0	0	0	0	0	1	0
7	(Italy)	FW	Sebastiano Esposito	5	0	0	0	0	0	5	0
8	(Italy)	MF	Matteo Ricci	3	0	0	0	0	0	3	0
9	(Italy)	FW	Manuel De Luca	2	0	0	0	0	0	2	0
10	(Italy)	MF	Valerio Verre	9	0	0	0	0	0	9	0
11	(Spain)	FW	Estanis Pedrola	4	0	0	0	0	0	4	0
14	(Switzerland)	MF	Pajtim Kasami	3	1	0	0	0	0	3	1
16	(Italy)	FW	Fabio Borini	5	0	0	0	0	0	5	0
20	(Italy)	FW	Antonino La Gumina	5	1	0	0	0	0	5	1
21	(Italy)	DF	Simone Giordano	4	1	0	0	1	0	5	1
23	(Italy)	DF	Fabio Depaoli	11	0	1	0	1	0	13	0
25	(Italy)	DF	Alex Ferrari	2	0	0	0	1	0	3	0
28	(Spain)	MF	Gerard Yepes	7	0	0	0	0	0	7	0
29	(Italy)	DF	Nicola Murru	4	0	0	0	0	0	4	0
32	(Italy)	MF	Stefano Girelli	1	0	0	0	0	0	1	0
33	(Uruguay)	DF	Facundo González	12	0	0	0	0	0	12	0
40	(Slovenia)	DF	Petar Stojanović	8	0	1	0	0	0	9	0
55	(The Gambia)	MF	Ebrima Darboe	3	0	0	0	0	0	3	0
80	(Italy)	MF	Leonardo Benedetti	2	1	0	0	0	0	2	1
87	(Italy)	DF	Daniele Ghilardi	8	0	0	0	1	0	9	0
Players away on loan:
Players who left Sampdoria during the season:
6	(Italy)	MF	Simone Panada	1	0	0	0	0	0	1	0
Total				105	4	2	0	4	0	111	4
