= 2022–23 LR Vicenza season =

Vicenza
2022–23 season
- Chairman: Renzo Rosso
- Manager: Francesco Modesto
- Stadium: Stadio Lino Turina
- Serie C: 7th
- Coppa Italia Serie C: Winners

The 2022–23 LR Vicenza season was the club's 121st season in existence and its first season back in the third division of Italian football. In addition to the domestic league, LR Vicenza are participated in this season's edition of the Coppa Italia Serie C. The season covered the period from 1 July 2022 to 30 June 2023.

== Players ==
=== First-team squad ===
As of 31 January 2023

Note: Flags indicate national team as defined under FIFA eligibility rules; some limited exceptions apply. Players may hold more than one non-FIFA nationality.

| No. | Pos. | Nation | Player |
|---|---|---|---|
| 1 | GK | SLO | Rok Bržan |
| 2 | DF | ITA | Federico Valietti (on loan from Genoa) |
| 4 | DF | ITA | Christian Corradi |
| 5 | DF | ITA | Marco Bellich |
| 6 | MF | ITA | Loris Zonta (Captain) |
| 7 | MF | ITA | Nicola Dalmonte |
| 8 | MF | BRA | Ronaldo |
| 9 | FW | ITA | Franco Ferrari |
| 10 | FW | ITA | Stefano Giacomelli |
| 11 | FW | ITA | Alex Rolfini |
| 13 | DF | ITA | Nicola Pasini |
| 15 | MF | ITA | Jean Freddi Greco |
| 17 | MF | ITA | Fabio Scarsella |

| No. | Pos. | Nation | Player |
|---|---|---|---|
| 19 | FW | SLO | Tjaš Begić |
| 20 | MF | ESP | Kaleb Jiménez Castillo (on loan from Salernitana) |
| 21 | MF | ITA | Riccardo Cataldi |
| 22 | GK | ITA | Alessandro Iacobucci |
| 23 | DF | ITA | Daniel Cappelletti |
| 27 | FW | ITA | Matteo Stoppa (on loan from Sampdoria) |
| 60 | DF | SEN | Maissa Ndiaye (on loan from Cremonese) |
| 68 | DF | ITA | Mario Ierardi |
| 73 | DF | ITA | Thomas Sandon |
| 77 | MF | ITA | Michele Cavion |
| 88 | MF | ITA | Enrico Oviszach |
| 98 | GK | ITA | Alessandro Confente |
| 99 | MF | ITA | Matteo Della Morte |

=== Out on loan ===
Note: Flags indicate national team as defined under FIFA eligibility rules; some limited exceptions apply. Players may hold more than one non-FIFA nationality.

| No. | Pos. | Nation | Player |
|---|---|---|---|
| — | GK | ITA | Mattia Morello (at Arzignano until 30 June 2023) |
| — | GK | ITA | Sebastiano Desplanches (at Trento until 30 June 2023) |
| — | GK | ITA | Nicolas Gerardi (at Montebelluna until 30 June 2023) |
| — | DF | FRA | Sebastien De Maio (at Modena until 30 June 2023) |
| — | DF | ITA | Nicholas Fantoni (at Ancona until 30 June 2023) |
| — | DF | ITA | Alberto Lattanzio (at Arzignano until 30 June 2023) |
| — | DF | ITA | Federico Paoloni (at Aprilia until 30 June 2023) |
| — | DF | ITA | Mattia Santi (at Virtus Verona until 30 June 2023) |

| No. | Pos. | Nation | Player |
|---|---|---|---|
| — | MF | ITA | Stefano Cester (at Arzignano until 30 June 2023) |
| — | MF | TOG | Malik Djibril (at Fidelis Andria until 30 June 2023) |
| — | MF | ITA | Alessandro Favero (at Montecchio Maggiore until 30 June 2023) |
| — | MF | ITA | Federico Proia (at Ascoli until 30 June 2023) |
| — | MF | ITA | Raul Talarico (at Virtus Verona until 30 June 2023) |
| — | MF | ITA | Simone Tronchin (at Virtus Verona until 30 June 2023) |
| — | FW | ITA | Filippo Alessio (at Empoli U19 until 30 June 2023) |
| — | FW | ITA | Tommaso Busatto (at Fermana until 30 June 2023) |

== Pre-season and friendlies ==
Win Draw Loss Fixtures

| August 2022 Friendly | (Italy) | v | (Italy) L.R. Vicenza |
| CEST (UTC+2) |

== Competitions ==
=== Overview ===
| Competition | First match | Last match | Starting round | Record | | | | | | | |
| Competition | First match | Last match | Starting round | Pld | W | D | L | GF | GA | GD | Win % |
|---|---|---|---|---|---|---|---|---|---|---|---|
| Serie C | 4 September 2022 | May 2023 | Matchday 1 | 0 | 0 | 0 | 0 | 0 | 0 | +0 | — |
| Coppa Italia Serie C | 5 October 2022 | | First round | 5 | 3 | 1 | 1 | 9 | 4 | +5 | 60.00 |
| Total | | | | 5 | 3 | 1 | 1 | 9 | 4 | +5 | 60.00 |

Last updated: March 2023
Source: Soccerway

=== Serie C ===
==== League table ====
| Pos | Team | Pld | W | D | L | GF | GA | GD | Pts | Qualification |
|---|---|---|---|---|---|---|---|---|---|---|
| 5 | Padova | 38 | 15 | 14 | 9 | 47 | 40 | +7 | 59 | Qualification for the promotion play-offs group phase (Note: Since Vicenza, the winners of the 2022-23 Coppa Italia Serie C, finished within the top 10 places in the group, Pergolettese, the 11-th placed team, qualifies for the group phase of the promotion play-offs.) |
| 6 | Virtus Verona | 38 | 15 | 13 | 10 | 46 | 30 | +16 | 58 (Note: Virtus Verona ahead of Vicenza due to goal difference in head-to-head matches: VVE-VIC 1-2; VIC-VVE 0-2) | Qualification for the promotion play-offs group phase |
| 7 | Vicenza (Note: Vicenza qualified to the national phase of the promotion play-offs by winning the 2022-23 Coppa Italia Serie C.) | 38 | 17 | 7 | 14 | 64 | 47 | +17 | 58 | Qualification for the promotion play-offs national phase |
| 8 | Renate | 38 | 14 | 11 | 13 | 49 | 55 | −6 | 53 (Note: Renate ahead of Arzignano Valchiampo due to head-to-head matches: REN-ARZ 3-0; ARZ-REN 2-3) | Qualification for the promotion play-offs group phase |
| 9 | Arzignano Valchiampo | 38 | 13 | 14 | 11 | 43 | 38 | +5 | 53 | Qualification for the promotion play-offs group phase |

Updated to match(es) played on 16 April 2023. Source: Lega Pro, Soccerway (in English)
Rules for classification: 1) Points; 2) Head-to-head points; 3) Head-to-head goal difference; 4) Goal difference; 5) Goals scored; 6) Lower goals against; 7) Wins; 8) Lower losses; 9) Away wins; 10) Lower home losses.

==== Results summary ====
| Overall | | | | | | | | Home | | | | | | Away | | | | | |
| Pld | W | D | L | GF | GA | GD | Pts | W | D | L | GF | GA | GD | W | D | L | GF | GA | GD |
|---|---|---|---|---|---|---|---|---|---|---|---|---|---|---|---|---|---|---|---|
| 0 | 0 | 0 | 0 | 0 | 0 | 0 | 0 | 0 | 0 | 0 | 0 | 0 | 0 | 0 | 0 | 0 | 0 | 0 | 0 |

Last updated: March 2023.

==== Results by round ====
| Round | 1 |
|---|---|
| Ground | |
| Result | |
| Position | |

Updated to match(es) played on March 2023. Source:
A = Away; H = Home; W = Win; D = Draw; L = Loss

==== Matches ====
The league fixtures were announced on 26 August 2022.

| September 2022 | Vicenza | – |
| CET (UTC+1) |

=== Coppa Italia Serie C ===
| 18 January 2023 Semi-finals; First leg | Virtus Entella | 1–0 | Vicenza | Chiavari |
| CET (UTC+1) | | | | Stadium: Stadio Comunale |

| 15 February 2023 Semi-finals; Second leg | Vicenza | 4–1 (4–2 agg.) | Virtus Entella |
| CET (UTC+1) |
