= Simone Giordano =

Italian footballer (born 2001)

Personal information
- Date of birth: 21 December 2001 (age 24)
- Place of birth: Genoa, Italy
- Height: 1.84 m (6 ft 0 in)
- Positions: Left-back; left midfielder

Team information
- Current team: Eyüpspor
- Number: 21

Youth career
- 2009–2021: Sampdoria

Senior career*
Years	Team	Apps	(Gls)
2021–2026	Sampdoria	66	(2)
2021–2022	→ Piacenza (loan)	33	(1)
2022–2023	→ Ascoli (loan)	18	(0)
2025	→ Mantova (loan)	12	(0)
2026–	Eyüpspor	1	(0)
- * Club domestic league appearances and goals as of 13 May 2026

Simone Giordano (born 21 December 2001) is an Italian professional footballer who plays as a left-back or a left midfielder for Süper Lig club Eyüpspor.

== Personal life ==
Giordano was born in Genoa and he is a supporter of Sampdoria.

== Career ==
=== Sampdoria ===
Giordano was in all of the Sampdoria youth teams from 2009 to 2021. In 2013 Tottenham Hotspur tried to buy him.

With Sampdoria U19 he reached the historic first place in the Primavera 1 championship in the 2020–21 season, providing 2 goals and 11 assists.

On 2020, he signed his first professional deal with the club, bonding until 2024. In 2022, he renews the contract until 2026.

=== Piacenza ===
In June 2021 he was sent on loan to Piacenza Calcio making his debut on 22 August 2021 against A.C. Reggiana 1919.

He scores his first goal with Piacenza Calcio on 17 March against third-placed Renate. He plays the championship as a protagonist, reaching the play-off goal for qualifying for Serie B.

He ended the season with 35 appearances, 1 goal and 7 assists.

=== Ascoli ===
On 4 July 2022, his loan to Ascoli in Serie B was made official.

The first match of the season in the Italian Cup against Venice on 7 August 2022 makes his debut with Ascoli.

He made his Serie B debut against Ternana by winning 2–1 on 14 August 2022. Initially started as a replacement for Falasco, named best full-back in Serie B of 2022, in the second season of the championship he takes the starting position given the great performances offered. At the end of the championship, Giordano achieved the best points average among all Ascoli defenders (1.39 per game with him on the pitch).

=== Loan to Mantova ===
On 7 January 2025, Giordano moved on loan to Mantova, with an option to buy.

== Style of play ==
Giordano can play the roles of left-back or left midfielder. He is the youngest Sampdoria player to make his debut in the Primavera 1 championship (15 years and 8 months).

A natural left-footed player with a strong weaker right foot, he possesses good technical ability and striking power. He is effective at set pieces and is capable of accurate kicking and crossing from both dead-ball situations and while in motion. He also demonstrates smooth dribbling when running with the ball.

== Career statistics ==
As of match played on 9 November 2024

Appearances and goals by club, season and competition
Club	Season	League			National cup		Other		Total	
Club	Season	Division	Apps	Goals	Apps	Goals	Apps	Goals	Apps	Goals
Piacenza (loan)	2021–22	Serie C	33	1	0	0	2 (Note: Appearances in the Coppa Italia Serie C)	0	35	1
Ascoli (loan)	2022–23	Serie B	18	0	2	0	—		20	0
Sampdoria	2023–24	Serie B	28	2	2	0	1 (Note: Appearances in Serie B promotion play-offs)	0	31	2
Sampdoria	2024–25	Serie B	5	0	1	0	—		6	0
Sampdoria	Total		33	2	3	0	1	0	37	2
Career total			84	3	5	0	3	0	92	3
