= Matteo Stoppa =

Italian footballer (born 2000)

Personal information
- Date of birth: 27 September 2000 (age 26)
- Place of birth: Biella, Italy
- Height: 1.75 m (5 ft 9 in)
- Position: Forward

Team information
- Current team: Campobasso
- Number: 10

Youth career
- 2005–2010: Junior Biellese Libertas
- 2010–2017: Novara
- 2019–2020: Juventus
- 2020: → Sampdoria (loan)

Senior career*
Years	Team	Apps	(Gls)
2017–2019	Novara	19	(1)
2019–2020	Juventus	0	(0)
2020	→ Sampdoria (loan)	0	(0)
2020–2024	Sampdoria	1	(0)
2020–2021	→ Pistoiese (loan)	29	(2)
2021–2022	→ Juve Stabia (loan)	34	(11)
2022	→ Palermo (loan)	3	(0)
2022–2023	→ Vicenza (loan)	36	(9)
2023–2024	→ Catanzaro (loan)	23	(0)
2024–2026	Catania	37	(4)
2026	→ Sambenedettese (loan)	15	(1)
2026–	Campobasso	2	(0)

International career^{‡}
2017	Italy U18	2	(0)
2018	Italy U19	1	(0)
- * Club domestic league appearances and goals as of 29 August 2026. ‡ National team caps and goals as of 14 August 2018

Matteo Stoppa (born 27 September 2000) is an Italian professional footballer who plays as a forward for Serie C Group B club Campobasso.

== Club career ==
Stoppa joined the Novara academy at the age of 10, and had a trial with Manchester City in 2016. Stoppa made his professional debut for Novara in a Serie B 2-0 loss to Carpi on 18 May 2017, at the age of 16.

On 8 August 2019, he moved to Juventus.

On 30 January 2020, he joined Sampdoria on loan with an obligation to buy. He played for Sampdoria's Under-19 squad for the remainder of the 2019–20 season.

On 23 September 2020, he was loaned to Serie C club Pistoiese. On 26 July 2021, he joined another Serie C club Juve Stabia on loan.

On 28 July 2022, Stoppa was loaned to Palermo, with an option to buy. The loan was however terminated on 1 September 2022, with the player making three league appearances as a substitute with the Rosanero, as he was immediately loaned out to Serie C side Vicenza for the rest of the season.

After returning to Sampdoria and appearing in a Coppa Italia game and their 2023–24 Serie B season opener, on 21 August 2023 Stoppa moved on loan to Catanzaro.

On 30 August 2024, Stoppa signed a three-season contract with Catania.

== International career ==
Stoppa was a youth international for Italy.

== Career statistics ==
=== Club ===
As of match played 29 March 2026

Appearances and goals by club, season and competition
Club	Season	League			Coppa Italia		Other		Total	
Club	Season	Division	Apps	Goals	Apps	Goals	Apps	Goals	Apps	Goals
Novara	2016–17	Serie B	1	0	0	0	—		1	0
Novara	2018–19	Serie C	18	1	2	1	0	0	20	2
Novara	Total		19	1	2	1	0	0	21	2
Juventus	2019–20	Serie A	0	0	0	0	0	0	0	0
Sampdoria (loan)	2019–20	Serie A	0	0	—		—		0	0
Sampdoria	2020–21	Serie A	0	0	0	0	—		0	0
Sampdoria	2021–22	Serie A	0	0	0	0	—		0	0
Sampdoria	2022–23	Serie A	0	0	0	0	—		0	0
Sampdoria	2023–24	Serie B	1	0	1	0	0	0	2	0
Sampdoria	Total		1	0	1	0	0	0	2	0
Pistoiese (loan)	2020–21	Serie C	29	2	—		—		29	2
Juve Stabia (loan)	2021–22	Serie C	36	11	—		—		36	11
Palermo (loan)	2022–23	Serie B	3	0	1	0	—		4	0
Vicenza (loan)	2022–23	Serie C	32	8	—		10 (Note: Six appearances, one goal in Coppa Italia Serie C; Four appearances, one goal in Serie C Promotion play-offs)	2	42	10
Catanzaro (loan)	2023–24	Serie B	26	0	—		0	0	26	0
Catania	2024–25	Serie C	27	5	—		4 (Note: Appearance(s) in Serie C Promotion play-offs)	0	31	5
Catania	2025–26	Serie C	12	0	—		0	0	12	0
Catania	Total		39	5	—		4	0	43	5
Sambenedettese	2025–26	Serie C	13	1	—		—		13	1
Career total			198	28	4	1	14	2	216	31
