= Hugo Buyla =

Equatoguinean footballer (born 2003)

Personal information
- Full name: Hugo Buyla Sam
- Date of birth: 8 March 2005 (age 21)
- Place of birth: Zaragoza, Spain
- Height: 1.91 m (6 ft 3 in)
- Position: Centre-back

Team information
- Current team: América under-23
- Number: 224

Youth career
- –2018: CD Oliver
- 2018–2021: Zaragoza
- 2021–2024: Atalanta
- 2023–2024: → Sampdoria (loan)
- 2024–: América

Senior career*
Years	Team	Apps	(Gls)
2023–2024	Atalanta	0	(0)
2023–2024	→ Sampdoria (loan)	0	(0)

International career^{‡}
2024–	Equatorial Guinea	1	(0)
- * Club domestic league appearances and goals as of 20:15, 18 August 2024 (UTC) ‡ National team caps and goals as of 9 January 2024

Hugo Buyla Sam (born 8 March 2005) is a professional footballer who plays as a centre-back for Liga MX under-23 club América. Born in Spain, he plays for the Equatorial Guinea national team.

== Club career ==
Buyla is a youth product of the Spanish clubs El Olivar and Zaragoza, before moving to the youth academy of the Italian club Atalanta in 2021. On 31 August 2023, he joined the Serie B club Sampdoria on loan from Atalanta. He made his senior and professional debut with Sampdoria as a late substitute in a 4–0 Coppa Italia loss to Salernitana on 31 October 2023.

== International career ==
Born in Spain, Buyla is of Equatoguinean Bubi descent. In November 2023 he received his first callup to the Equatorial Guinea national team for a set of 2026 FIFA World Cup qualification matches. He made his international debut with the Equatorial Guinea in a friendly 1–1 draw against Djibouti on 9 January 2024. He was called up to the national team for the 2023 Africa Cup of Nations.

== Personal life ==
Buyla is the brother of the footballer Jannick Buyla.
