= Simone Panada =

Italian footballer (born 2002)

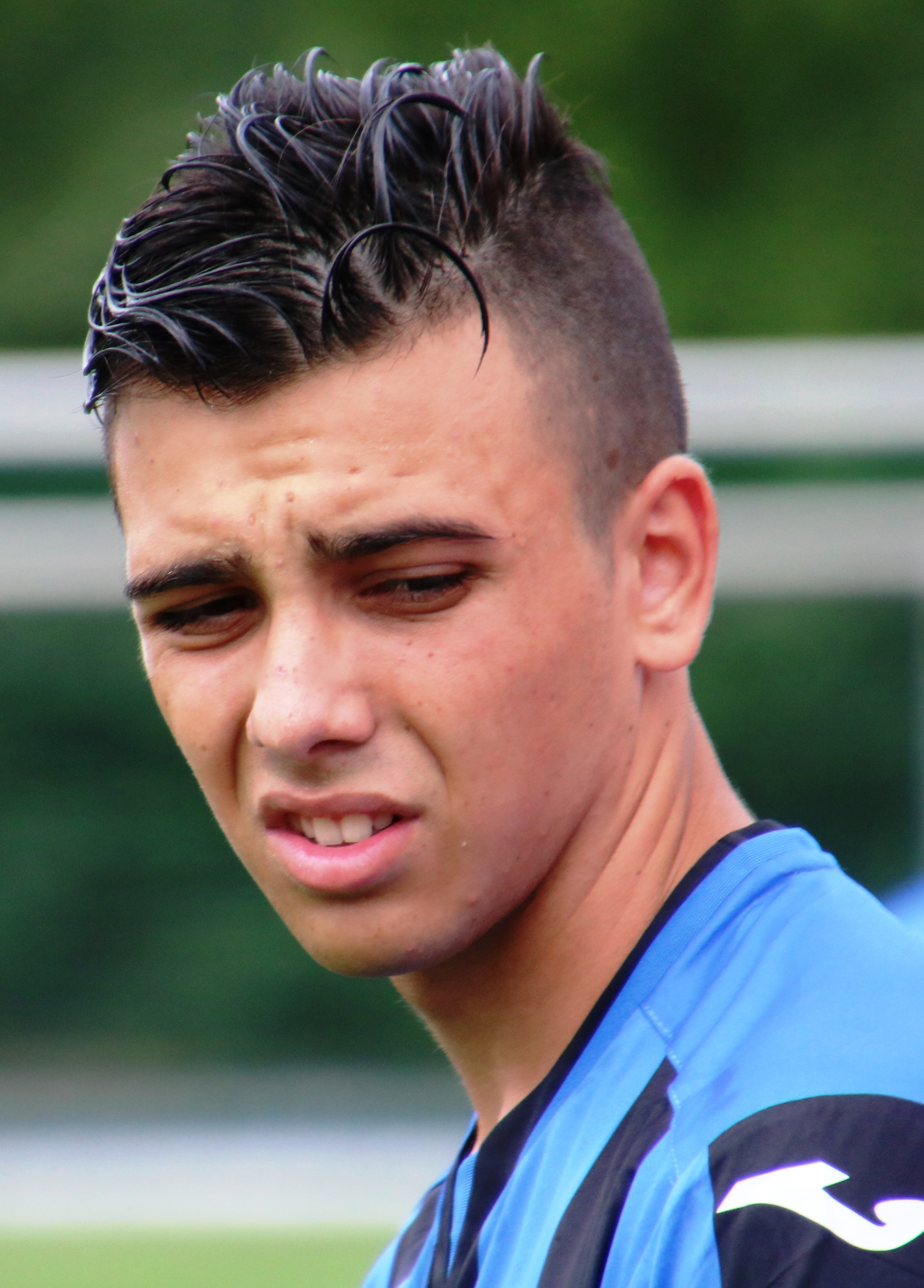
- Panada playing for Atalanta in 2017

Personal information
- Date of birth: 2 June 2002 (age 24)
- Place of birth: Brescia, Italy
- Height: 1.75 m (5 ft 9 in)
- Position: Defensive midfielder

Team information
- Current team: Venezia
- Number: 55

Youth career
- –2008: Torbole Casaglia
- 2008–2022: Atalanta

Senior career*
Years	Team	Apps	(Gls)
2022–2026	Atalanta	0	(0)
2022–2023	→ Modena (loan)	10	(0)
2023–2024	→ Sampdoria (loan)	3	(0)
2022–2026	Atalanta U23	65	(5)
2026–	Venezia	0	(0)
2026	→ Atalanta U23 (loan)	15	(1)

International career^{‡}
2017	Italy U15	8	(0)
2017–2018	Italy U16	11	(1)
2018–2019	Italy U17	25	(1)
2019	Italy U18	4	(0)
2020	Italy U19	1	(0)
2022	Italy U20	1	(0)
- * Club domestic league appearances and goals as of 23 August 2026 ‡ National team caps and goals as of 23:00, 7 June 2022 (UTC)

Simone Panada (born 2 June 2002) is an Italian professional footballer who plays as a defensive midfielder for Serie A club Venezia.

== Club career ==
Born in Brescia, Panada started playing football at grassroots level in the nearby comune of Torbole Casaglia: in 2008, aged six, he trialed for his hometown club before joining the youth sector of Brescia's main rivals, Atalanta. He eventually came through all the youth ranks of the club until the under-19 team, with whom he won a national championship and a Super Cup and took part in the UEFA Youth League. In the meantime, the midfielder also received several call-ups to the first team, albeit without making his senior debut in any of those occasions.

On 7 July 2022, Panada joined Serie B club Modena on a season-long loan. He subsequently made his professional debut on 31 July, coming in as a substitute in the second half of a 3–1 win against Catanzaro, in the preliminary turn of the Coppa Italia. He then started the following cup match on 8 August, as his side gained a 3–2 home win against Sassuolo. Finally, on 14 August, he made his league debut, coming in as a substitute in the second half of a 1–0 loss against Frosinone.

On 27 July 2023, Panada signed a four-year deal for Sampdoria. The transfer was structured as an initial loan for the 2023–24 season with an option to make the transfer permanent after, with Atalanta retaining a counter-option to buy his rights back at that time.

On 22 January 2026, Panada signed with Venezia until 30 June 2030 and was loaned back to Atalanta until the end of the 2025–26 season.

== International career ==
Panada has represented Italy at all youth international levels, from the Under-15s all the way to the Under-20 national team.

In 2019, he captained the Under-17 national team both at the UEFA European Championship in the Republic of Ireland, where the Azzurrini finished as runners-up, and the FIFA World Cup in Brazil, where Italy were eliminated by the hosts and eventual champions in the quarter-finals.

On 7 June 2022, he made his debut for the Under-20 national team in a 1–0 loss against Poland.

== Style of play ==
Panada is a defensive midfielder, who can also play in a more advanced position, or even as a central defender. Despite having a slightly diminutive physique, he still can win the ball back and defend it from opponents, thanks to his strength and technique. A right-footed player, he is also regarded for his passing, his ability to dictate the team's tempo and his shooting.

== Career statistics ==
=== Club ===
As of match played 29 May 2024

Appearances and goals by club, season and competition
Club	Season	League			Coppa Italia		Other		Total	
Club	Season	Division	Apps	Goals	Apps	Goals	Apps	Goals	Apps	Goals
Modena (loan)	2022–23	Serie B	10	0	2	0	0	0	12	0
Sampdoria (loan)	2023–24	Serie B	3	0	1	0	0	0	4	0
Career total			13	0	3	0	0	0	16	0

== Honours ==
Atalanta Under-19

- Campionato Primavera 1: 2019–20
- Supercoppa Primavera: 2020–21

Italy U17

- UEFA European Under-17 Championship runners-up: 2019

Individual

- UEFA European Under-17 Championship Team of the Tournament: 2019
