= Flavio Paoletti =

Italian footballer (born 2003)

Personal information
- Date of birth: 16 January 2003 (age 23)
- Place of birth: San Benedetto del Tronto, Italy
- Height: 1.82 m (6 ft 0 in)
- Position: Defensive midfielder

Team information
- Current team: Mantova
- Number: 36

Youth career
- 2010–2017: Atletico Azzurra Colli
- 2017–2023: Sampdoria

Senior career*
Years	Team	Apps	(Gls)
2023	Sampdoria	11	(0)
2023–2025	Fatih Karagümrük	36	(3)
2025–	Mantova	28	(0)

International career^{‡}
2019	Italy U17	1	(0)
- * Club domestic league appearances and goals as of 13 May 2026 ‡ National team caps and goals as of 04:12, 18 December 2022 (UTC)

Flavio Paoletti (born 16 January 2003) is an Italian professional footballer who plays as a defensive midfielder for Serie B club Mantova.

== Club career ==
Born in San Benedetto del Tronto and raised in Colli del Tronto, Paoletti started playing football at local club Atletico Azzurra Colli, before joining Sampdoria's youth sector in the summer of 2017. He then progressed through the club's youth ranks, as he eventually became the captain of their under-19 squad, and then signed his first professional contract in September 2022.

During the 2022–23 season, Paoletti started training with Sampdoria's first team under head coach Dejan Stanković: then, on 8 January 2023, he made his professional debut with the club, coming on as a substitute for Ronaldo Vieira in the 83rd minute of a 2–0 Serie A loss to Napoli. Four days later, on 12 January, the midfielder made his first start in a professional game, together with team-mate Daniele Montevago, in a 1–0 Coppa Italia loss to Fiorentina.

On 29 August 2023, Paoletti joined Turkish side Fatih Karagümrük on a permanent deal, signing a three-year contract with the club.

On 26 January 2025, Paoletti signed a three-and-a-half-year contract with Mantova in Serie B.

== International career ==
Paoletti has represented Italy at youth international level, having played for the under-17 national team.

In March 2023, he received a call-up to the Italian under-20 national team.

== Style of play ==
Paoletti has been described as a versatile midfielder, who can play either in a more defensive role or as a mezzala, while also being able to cover in the center-back position.

He cited Dennis Praet as a source of inspiration.

== Personal life ==
Paoletti is a self-declared supporter of Sambenedettese, the main club based in his birthplace.

== Career statistics ==
=== Club ===
As of match played 23 December 2023

Appearances and goals by club, season and competition
Club	Season	League			Cup (Note: Appearance(s) in the Coppa Italia and the Türkiye Kupası)		Europe		Other		Total	
Club	Season	Division	Apps	Goals	Apps	Goals	Apps	Goals	Apps	Goals	Apps	Goals
Sampdoria	2022–23	Serie A	11	0	1	0	–		–		12	0
Fatih Karagümrük	2023–24	Süper Lig	4	0	1	0	–		–		5	0
Career total			15	0	2	0	0	0	0	0	17	0
