= Estanis Pedrola =

Spanish footballer (born 2003)

Personal information
- Full name: Estanislau Pedrola Fortuny
- Date of birth: 24 August 2003 (age 23)
- Place of birth: Cambrils, Spain
- Height: 1.85 m (6 ft 1 in)
- Position: Forward

Team information
- Current team: Oviedo

Youth career
- 2010–2014: Reus
- 2014–2019: Espanyol
- 2019–2021: Reus
- 2021–2022: Barcelona

Senior career*
Years	Team	Apps	(Gls)
2021–2023	Barcelona B	30	(9)
2022–2024	Barcelona	1	(0)
2023–2024	→ Sampdoria (loan)	15	(3)
2024–2026	Sampdoria	16	(0)
2025	→ Bologna (loan)	1	(0)
2026	→ Las Palmas (loan)	20	(4)
2026–	Oviedo	0	(0)
- * Club domestic league appearances and goals as of 01:45, 4 August 2026 (UTC)

Estanislau "Estanis" Pedrola Fortuny (born 24 August 2003) is a Spanish professional footballer who plays as a forward for Segunda División club Real Oviedo.

== Club career ==
Born in Cambrils, Tarragona, Catalonia, Pedrola joined RCD Espanyol's youth setup in 2014, from local side CF Reus Deportiu. Released in 2019, he subsequently returned to Reus before joining FC Barcelona in June 2021, for the Juvenil A squad.

Pedrola made his senior debut with the reserves on 21 November 2021, coming on as a late substitute for Ferran Jutglà in a 2–0 Primera División RFEF away loss against Albacete Balompié. He scored his first senior goal on 12 December, netting the equalizer for the B's in a 3–1 home win over CD Alcoyano.

Pedrola made his first team – and La Liga – debut on 2 January 2022, replacing fellow youth graduate Ilias Akhomach in a 1–0 away success over RCD Mallorca.

On 11 August 2023, Pedrola signed a four-year contract with Italian club Sampdoria. He spent the 2023–24 season on loan, and then Sampdoria held an obligation to purchase his rights on a permanent basis.

On 3 February 2025, Pedrola joined Serie A club Bologna on loan with an option to buy. Back to Samp in July after just one appearance, he was again sparingly used before returning to his home country with UD Las Palmas on loan on 2 January 2026.

On 3 August 2026, Real Oviedo announced that Pedrola had signed a contract with the club until June 2030.

== Personal life ==
Pedrola was named after his great-grandfather, Estanislau Pedrola Rovira, a militant of Estat Català and republican fighter during the Spanish Civil War who later went into exile in France, was active in the French Resistance, and ultimately was killed in Flossenbürg concentration camp.

== Career statistics ==
=== Club ===
As of match played 24 April 2025

Appearances and goals by club, season and competition
Club	Season	League			Cup		Europe		Other		Total	
Club	Season	Division	Apps	Goals	Apps	Goals	Apps	Goals	Apps	Goals	Apps	Goals
Barcelona B	2021–22	Primera División RFEF	7	1	—		—		—		7	1
Barcelona B	2022–23	Primera Federación	23	8	—		—		1 (Note: Appearance in Copa Catalunya)	0	24	8
Barcelona B	Total		30	9	—		—		1	0	31	9
Barcelona	2021–22	La Liga	1	0	0	0	0	0	0	0	1	0
Sampdoria (loan)	2023–24	Serie B	15	3	1	0	—		—		16	3
Sampdoria	2024–25	Serie B	9	0	1	0	—		—		10	0
Bologna (loan)	2024–25	Serie A	1	0	1	0	—		—		2	0
Career total			56	12	3	0	0	0	1	0	60	12

== Honours ==
Barcelona B

- División de Honor Juvenil de Fútbol: 2021–22

Bologna

- Coppa Italia: 2024–25
