= Filip Stanković (footballer, born 2002) =

Serbian footballer (born 2002)

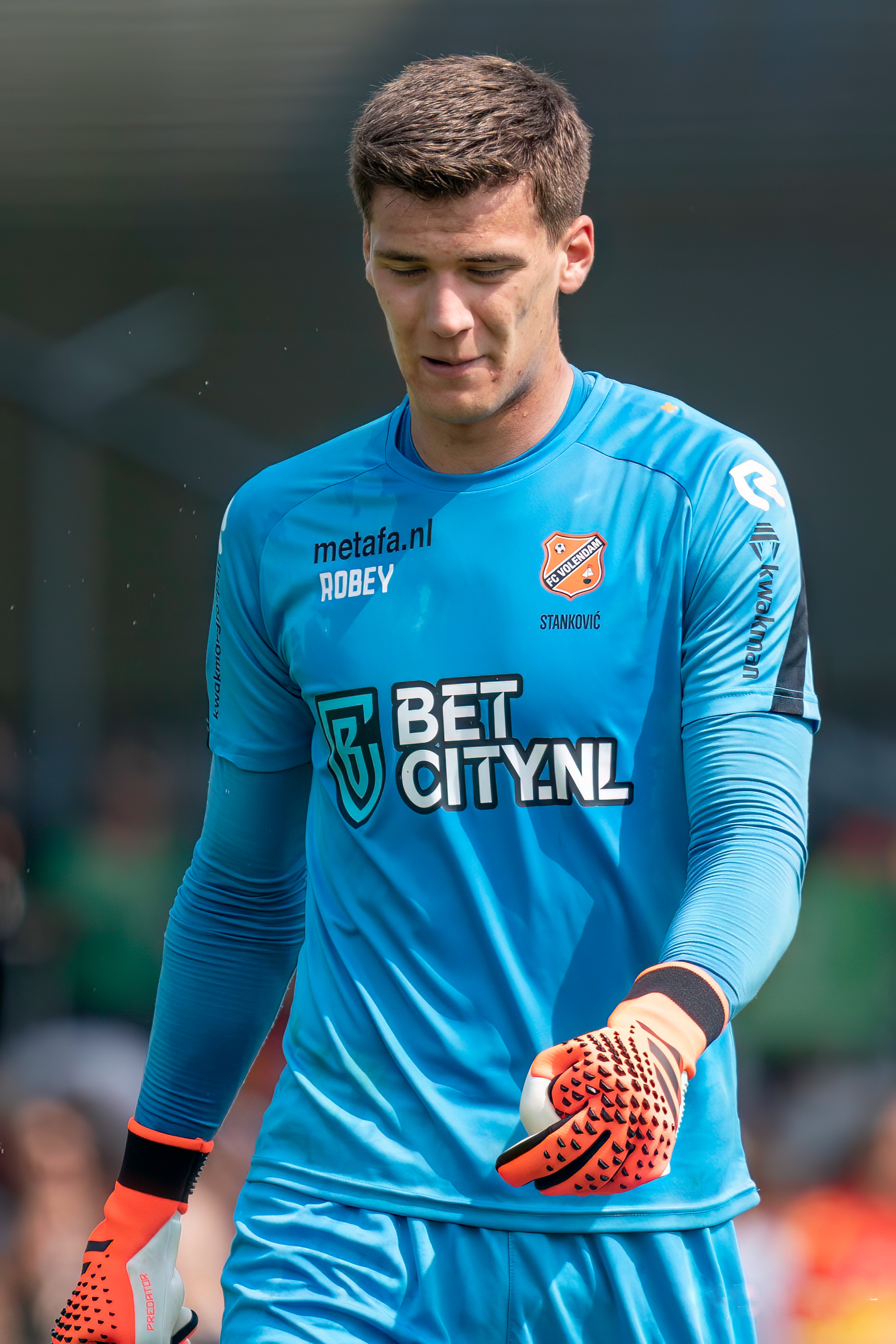
- Stanković with Volendam in 2023

Personal information
- Date of birth: 25 February 2002 (age 24)
- Place of birth: Rome, Italy
- Height: 1.87 m (6 ft 2 in)
- Position: Goalkeeper

Team information
- Current team: Venezia
- Number: 1

Youth career
- 2014–2021: Inter Milan

Senior career*
Years	Team	Apps	(Gls)
2021–2025	Inter Milan	0	(0)
2021–2023	→ Volendam (loan)	61	(0)
2023–2024	→ Sampdoria (loan)	37	(0)
2024–2025	→ Venezia (loan)	16	(0)
2025–	Venezia	49	(0)

International career^{‡}
2017	Serbia U16	1	(0)
2019	Serbia U17	7	(0)
2019	Serbia U19	1	(0)
2022–2023	Serbia U21	2	(0)
2026–	Serbia	2	(0)
- * Club domestic league appearances and goals as of 20:30, 6 November 2026 (UTC) ‡ National team caps and goals as of 5 June 2026

Filip Stanković (Serbian Cyrillic: Филип Станковић, Serbian pronunciation: [fǐlip stǎŋkoʋitɕ]; born 25 February 2002) is a Serbian professional footballer who plays as a goalkeeper for Serie A club Venezia and the Serbia national team.

== Club career ==
=== Inter Milan ===
==== Loans to Volendam ====
Stanković is a youth academy graduate of Inter Milan. On 4 August 2021, Dutch club Volendam announced the signing of Stanković on a season-long loan deal. He made his professional debut on 6 August in a 2–2 draw against FC Eindhoven. Following 28 league appearances and achieving promotion to the Eredivisie on his first season, on 20 July 2022, Stanković officially re-joined Volendam on another one-year loan.

==== Loan to Sampdoria ====
After playing most of the pre-season games as a starting goalkeeper for Inter following the departure of André Onana, on 11 August 2023, Stanković joined Serie B club Sampdoria on a one-year loan, with an option to buy and counter option in favour of Inter.

=== Venezia ===
On 12 August 2024, Stanković joined newly promoted Serie A club Venezia on a season-long loan with an option and a conditional obligation to buy.

Despite suffering relegation to Serie B at the conclusion of the 2024–25 season, Venezia opted to activate their option to sign Stanković on a permanent deal.

== International career ==
Stanković has represented Serbia at various youth levels. In November 2023, he received his first call-up to the Serbia national team. He made his debut on 31 May 2026 in a 3–0 loss to Cape Verde.

== Personal life ==
Stanković is the son of former Serbia national team player Dejan Stanković. His younger brother Aleksandar Stanković is also a footballer. He is of Slovenian descent through his mother. He is the nephew of former Slovenian national team player Milenko Ačimovič.

== Career statistics ==
=== Club ===
As of match played 6 November 2026

Appearances and goals by club, season and competition
Club	Season	League			National cup (Note: Includes KNVB Cup, Coppa Italia)		Europe		Other		Total	
Club	Season	Division	Apps	Goals	Apps	Goals	Apps	Goals	Apps	Goals	Apps	Goals
Inter Milan	2019–20	Serie A	0	0	0	0	0	0	0	0	0	0
Inter Milan	2020–21	Serie A	0	0	0	0	0	0	0	0	0	0
Inter Milan	Total		0	0	0	0	0	0	0	0	0	0
Volendam (loan)	2021–22	Eerste Divisie	28	0	1	0	—		—		29	0
Volendam (loan)	2022–23	Eredivisie	33	0	2	0	—		—		35	0
Volendam (loan)	Total		61	0	3	0	—		—		64	0
Sampdoria (loan)	2023–24	Serie B	37	0	0	0	—		1 (Note: Appearance in promotion play-offs)	0	38	0
Venezia (loan)	2024–25	Serie A	16	0	0	0	—		—		16	0
Venezia	2025–26	Serie B	38	0	0	0	—		—		38	0
Venezia	2026–27	Serie A	11	0	1	0	—		—		12	0
Venezia	Venezia total		65	0	1	0	—		—		66	0
Career total			163	0	4	0	0	0	1	0	168	0

=== International ===
As of match played 4 June 2026

Appearances and goals by national team and year
National team	Year	Apps	Goals
Serbia	2026	2	0
Total		2	0

== Honours ==
Venezia

- Serie B: 2025–26
