= 2024–25 Catania FC season =

Catania FC
2024–25 season
- Manager: Domenico Toscano
- Stadium: Stadio Angelo Massimino
- Serie C: 5th
- Play-offs: National phase first round
- Coppa Italia Serie C: Round of 16
- Top goalscorer: Roberto Inglese (11)
- Biggest win: Taranto 1–5 Catania; Catania 4–0 Sorrento
- Biggest defeat: Catania 0–5 Trapani

The 2024–25 season is Catania FC's second consecutive campaign in Serie C, the third tier of Italian football. The team is also competing in the Coppa Italia Serie C.

== Competitions ==
=== Overall record ===
Competition	First match	Last match	Starting round	Final position	Record							
Competition	First match	Last match	Starting round	Final position	Pld	W	D	L	GF	GA	GD	Win %
Serie C	24 August 2024		Matchday 1		20	8	8	4	31	19	+12	40.00
Coppa Italia Serie C	18 August 2024	26 November 2024	Second round	Round of 16	2	0	1	1	1	6	−5	0.00
Total					22	8	9	5	32	25	+7	36.36

Last updated: 22 December 2024
Source: Competitions

=== Serie C ===
==== League table ====
Pos	Team	Pld	W	D	L	GF	GA	GD	Pts	Qualification
3	Monopoli	34	15	12	7	36	25	+11	57	National play-offs 1st round
4	Crotone	34	15	9	10	62	49	+13	54	Group play-offs 2nd round
5	Catania (Note: 1 point deducted due to having presented a late bank guarantee.)	34	14	12	8	49	34	+15	53	Group play-offs 1st round
6	Benevento	34	13	13	8	51	34	+17	52	Group play-offs 1st round
7	Potenza	34	12	13	9	55	52	+3	49	Group play-offs 1st round

Source: Lega Pro, Soccerway (in English)
Rules for classification: 1) Points; 2) Head-to-head points; 3) Head-to-head goal difference; 4) Goal difference; 5) Goals scored; 6) Lower goals against; 7) Wins; 8) Lower losses; 9) Away wins; 10) Lower home losses.
(Note: Head-to-head record is used only after all the matches between the teams in question have been played)

==== Results summary ====
Overall								Home						Away					
Pld	W	D	L	GF	GA	GD	Pts	W	D	L	GF	GA	GD	W	D	L	GF	GA	GD
20	8	8	4	31	19	+12	31	5	4	2	11	5	+6	3	4	2	20	14	+6

Last updated: 22 December 2024.
Source: Worldfootball

==== Results by round ====
Round	1	2	3	4	5	6	7	8	9	10	11	12	13	14	15	16	17	18	19	20	21
Ground	A	H	A	H	A	H	H	A	H	A	H	A	H	A	H	A	H	A	H	H	A
Result	D	W	W	D	L	D	W	W	W	D	L	D	D	L	W	D	D	W	L	W	
Position	14	9	6	5	8	9	7	5	3	2	6	7	7	9	6	9	9	6	8	7	

Updated to match(es) played on 22 December 2024. Source: Worldfootball
A = Away; H = Home; W = Win; D = Draw; L = Loss

==== Matches ====
The league schedule was released on 15 July 2024.

24 August 2024 1	Sorrento	0–0	Catania

2 September 2024 2	Catania	1–0	Benevento

7 September 2024 3	Juventus Next Gen	1–3	Catania

14 September 2024 4	Catania	0–0	Picerno

22 September 2024 5	Giugliano	3–2	Catania

25 September 2024 6	Catania	0–0	Audace Cerignola

29 September 2024 7	Catania	1–0	Monopoli

6 October 2024 8	Casertana	1–3	Catania

12 October 2024 9	Catania	2–0	Altamura

20 October 2024 10	Foggia	2–2	Catania

27 October 2024 11	Catania	0–1	Latina

31 October 2024 12	Turris	1–1	Catania

3 November 2024 13	Catania	0–0	Messina

10 November 2024 14	Crotone	3–2	Catania

15 November 2024 15	Catania	2–1	Trapani

23 November 2024 16	Avellino	2–2	Catania

30 November 2024 17	Catania	1–1	Cavese

8 December 2024 18	Taranto	1–5	Catania

14 December 2024 19	Catania	0–2	Potenza

22 December 2024 20	Catania	4–0	Sorrento

5 January 2025 21	Benevento	v	Catania
15:00

=== Coppa Italia Serie C ===
18 August 2024 Second round	Catania	1–1 (a.e.t.) (6–5 p)	Crotone
21:00

26 November 2024 Round of 16	Catania	0–5	Trapani
20:30
