= Ebrima Darboe =

Gambian footballer (born 2001)

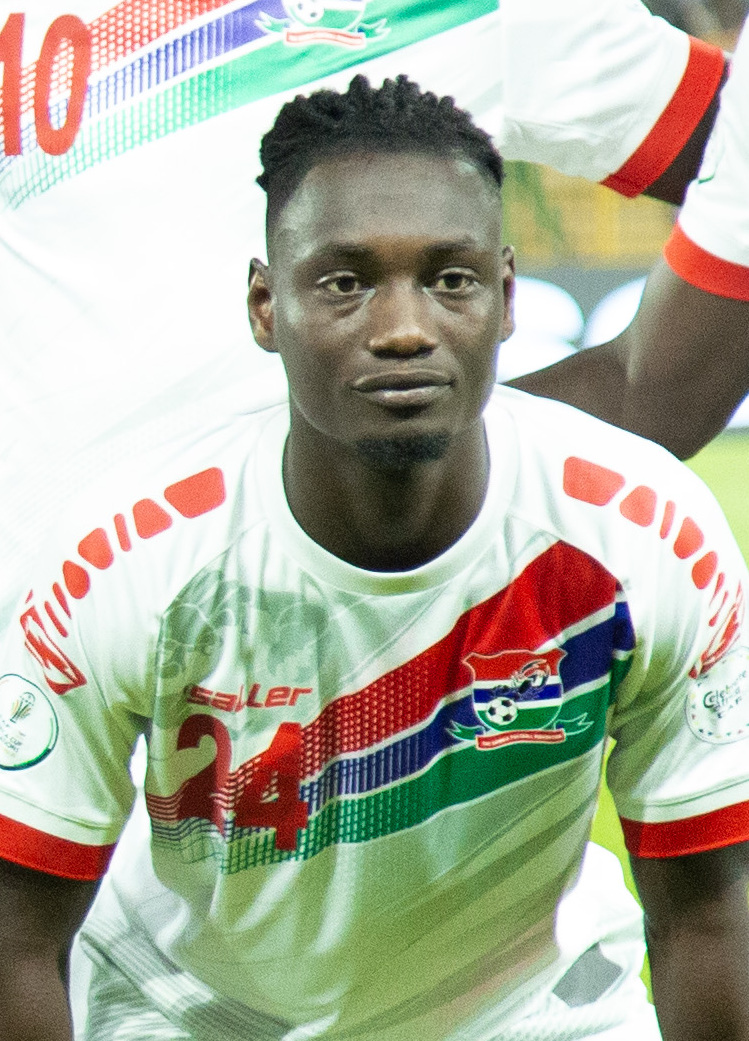
- Darboe with Gambia at the 2023 Africa Cup of Nations

Personal information
- Date of birth: 6 June 2001 (age 25)
- Place of birth: Bakoteh, The Gambia
- Height: 1.78 m (5 ft 10 in)
- Position: Defensive midfielder

Team information
- Current team: Bari
- Number: 5

Youth career
- 2016–2017: Young Rieti
- 2017–2021: Roma

Senior career*
Years	Team	Apps	(Gls)
2021–2025	Roma	6	(0)
2023–2024	→ LASK (loan)	5	(0)
2024	→ Sampdoria (loan)	14	(2)
2024–2025	→ Frosinone (loan)	26	(2)
2025–	Bari	6	(0)

International career^{‡}
2021–	Gambia	15	(0)
- * Club domestic league appearances and goals as of 2 March 2026 ‡ National team caps and goals as of 19 January 2024

Ebrima Darboe (born 6 June 2001) is a Gambian professional footballer who plays as a defensive midfielder for Serie C Group C club Bari. He also plays for the Gambia national team.

== Early life ==
Ebrima Darboe was born in Bakoteh, a district of Serekunda in The Gambia. He left his birth country aged 14, alone, arriving in Libya, before sailing to Sicily, Italy, where he arrived as a refugee after a six-month journey.

In Italy, Darboe was taken in charge by the SPRAR – a service from the Italian ministry of the Interior – as an unaccompanied underage migrant and ended in Rieti, where he started playing with amateur club Young Rieti.

== Club career ==
Darboe joined Italian club Roma in summer 2017, making his primavera debut for the youth team in January 2019. Darboe signed his first professional contract with Roma the following July, having just turned eighteen. He first featured on as an unused substitute in Roma's 2–1 Serie A home victory against Milan on 27 October 2019. Darboe scored his first goal for the under-19 side in October 2020, and got an additional brace later that month in the Campionato Primavera.

Darboe made his professional debut for the club on 2 May 2021, coming off the bench for the final ten minutes of Roma's 2–0 defeat against Sampdoria. On 6 May, Darboe made his UEFA Europa League debut against Manchester United, in the second leg of the semi-finals. Darboe played in the Derby della Capitale against rivals Lazio on 15 May, becoming the first player born in the 2000s to do so.

On 7 July 2023, Darboe was loaned to Austrian Bundesliga club LASK for the 2023–24 season. On 1 February 2024, this loan was cut short, and Darboe was then loaned to Serie B club Sampdoria.

On 1 September 2025, Darboe signed a three-year contract with Serie B club Bari.

== International career ==
On 26 October 2020, while still a youth team player for Roma, Darboe received his first senior call-up for the Gambia national team by head coach Tom Saintfiet. He debuted for the Gambia in a 2–0 friendly win over Niger on 6 June 2021.

Darboe was selected to the Gambia squad for the 2021 Africa Cup of Nations, his national team's first continental tournament, where they made a sensational quarter-final.

== Career statistics ==
=== Club ===
As of match played 23 August 2024

Appearances and goals by club, season and competition
Club	Season	League			National Cup (Note: Includes Austrian Cup)		Europe		Other		Total	
Club	Season	Division	Apps	Goals	Apps	Goals	Apps	Goals	Apps	Goals	Apps	Goals
Roma	2020–21	Serie A	5	0	0	0	1 (Note: Appearance(s) in UEFA Europa League)	0	—		6	0
Roma	2021–22	Serie A	1	0	0	0	4 (Note: Appearance(s) in UEFA Conference League)	0	—		5	0
Roma	Total		6	0	0	0	5	0	—		11	0
LASK (loan)	2023–24	Austrian Bundesliga	5	0	1	0	2	0	—		8	0
Sampdoria (loan)	2023–24	Serie B	14	2	0	0	—		—		14	2
Career total			25	2	1	0	7	0	—		33	2

=== International ===
As of match played 19 January 2024.

Appearances and goals by national team and year
National team	Year	Apps	Goals
Gambia	2021	6	0
Gambia	2022	7	0
Gambia	2023	0	0
Gambia	2024	2	0
Total		15	0

== Honours ==
Roma

- UEFA Conference League: 2021–22
