= Stefano Girelli =

Italian footballer (born 2001)

Personal information
- Date of birth: 9 January 2001 (age 25)
- Place of birth: Brescia, Italy
- Height: 1.82 m (6 ft 0 in)
- Position: Midfielder

Team information
- Current team: Casertana (on loan from Sampdoria)
- Number: 21

Youth career
- –2017: Lumezzane
- 2017–2021: Cremonese

Senior career*
Years	Team	Apps	(Gls)
2021–2023	Cremonese	1	(0)
2021–2022	→ Pergolettese (loan)	34	(0)
2022–2023	→ Lecco (loan)	31	(3)
2023–	Sampdoria	17	(0)
2025	→ Salernitana (loan)	4	(0)
2026–	Casertana	13	(3)
- * Club domestic league appearances and goals as of 1 May 2026

Stefano Girelli (born 9 January 2001) is an Italian professional footballer who plays as a midfielder for Casertana.

== Career ==
Formed on Cremonese youth system, Girelli made his first team debut on 31 July 2020 against Pordenone for Serie B.

On 28 January 2021, he was loaned to Serie C club Pergolettese for the rest of the season. On 12 July 2021, the loan was extended by one year.

On 15 July 2022, Girelli was loaned to Lecco.

On 19 July 2023, he joined Sampdoria. On 9 January 2025, Girelli moved on loan to Salernitana, with an option to buy.

On 6 August 2026, he officially joined Serie C team Casertana for an undisclosed fee, with Sampdoria announcing his definitive departure from the club.
