= Daniele Montevago =

Italian footballer (born 2003)

Personal information
- Full name: Daniele Montevago
- Date of birth: 18 March 2003 (age 23)
- Place of birth: Palermo, Italy
- Height: 1.76 m (5 ft 9 in)
- Position: Forward

Team information
- Current team: Modena
- Number: 9

Youth career
- –2017: Stella d’Oriente
- 2017–2019: Palermo
- 2019–2022: Sampdoria

Senior career*
Years	Team	Apps	(Gls)
2022–2024	Sampdoria	6	(0)
2023	→ Gubbio (loan)	16	(2)
2024	→ Virtus Entella (loan)	13	(1)
2024–2026	Perugia	64	(23)
2026–	Modena	1	(0)

International career^{‡}
2022–2023	Italy U20	15	(1)
Medal record
Men's football
Representing Italy
FIFA U-20 World Cup
Runner-up	2023 Argentina
- * Club domestic league appearances and goals as of 22 August 2026 ‡ National team caps and goals as of 16 November 2023

Daniele Montevago (born 18 March 2003) is an Italian professional footballer who plays as a forward for Serie B club Modena.

== Club career ==
Born in Palermo, Montevago started playing football at three years old, before joining the local grassroots football school Stella d'Oriente. In 2017, he entered Palermo's youth sector, where he spent two seasons before the club ultimately faced bankruptcy; then, in 2019, he joined Sampdoria.

Following his performances for the Blucerchiati's youth teams, Montevago started training with the first team during the second half of the 2021-22 season, under manager Marco Giampaolo, and received his first call-ups to Serie A match-day squads. In the summer of 2022, the forward extended his contract with Sampdoria until 2025.

In the following campaign, Montevago kept training with the senior squad, under the new coach Dejan Stanković; he subsequently made his professional debut on 29 October 2022, coming in a substitute for Manolo Gabbiadini at the 78th minute of the 3–0 Serie A loss against Inter Milan. On 12 January 2023, he made his first start in a professional game, together with team-mate Flavio Paoletti, in a 1–0 Coppa Italia loss to Fiorentina.

On 1 September 2023, Montevago joined Serie C club Gubbio on loan. On 23 September, he scored his first professional goal in a 1–0 league win over Vis Pesaro.

On 11 January 2024, he joined fellow third-tier side Virtus Entella on loan until the end of the season.

On 29 July 2024, Montevago moved to Perugia on a three-year contract, with Sampdoria holding an option to buy back.

== International career ==
Montevago has represented Italy at youth international level. After taking part in training camps with the under-15 and under-16 national teams, he went on to play for the under-20 national team.

In May 2023, he was included by head coach Carmine Nunziata in the Italian squad that took part in the FIFA U-20 World Cup in Argentina, where the Azzurrini finished runners-up after losing to Uruguay in the final match.

== Style of play ==
Montevago is a centre forward, who has been regarded for his physical strength and his finishing.

Although he has been compared to Christian Vieri, he has actually named Duván Zapata and Fabio Quagliarella as his main sources of inspiration.

== Career statistics ==
As of match played 12 January 2023

Appearances and goals by club, season and competition
Club	Season	League			National cup		Continental		Total	
Club	Season	Division	Apps	Goals	Apps	Goals	Apps	Goals	Apps	Goals
Sampdoria	2022–23	Serie A	6	0	1	0	0	0	7	0
Career total			6	0	1	0	0	0	7	0

== Honours ==
Italy U20

- FIFA U-20 World Cup runner-up: 2023
