= Filippo Distefano =

Italian footballer (born 2003)

Personal information
- Date of birth: 28 August 2003 (age 23)
- Place of birth: Camaiore, Italy
- Height: 1.73 m (5 ft 8 in)
- Position: Forward

Team information
- Current team: Empoli
- Number: 20

Youth career
- 2010–2014: Ninfea Torrelaghese
- 2014–2017: Livorno
- 2017–2021: Fiorentina

Senior career*
Years	Team	Apps	(Gls)
2021–2026	Fiorentina	1	(0)
2023–2024	→ Ternana (loan)	31	(7)
2024–2025	→ Frosinone (loan)	13	(2)
2025–2026	→ Carrarese (loan)	20	(3)
2026–	Empoli	0	(0)
- * Club domestic league appearances and goals as of 13 May 2026

Filippo Distefano (born 28 August 2003) is an Italian professional footballer who plays as a forward for Serie B club Empoli.

== Early life ==
Filippo Distefano was born in Camaiore, a town in the Tuscan Province of Lucca, where he started to play football, at the club of Torre del Lago.

== Club career ==
Distefano first joined US Livorno – that was then playing in Serie A under Davide Nicola – where he spent 3 years, before joining the youth sector of ACF Fiorentina. First playing with the Primavera team, he was part of the squads who won the Coppa Italia Primavera in 2020 and 2021.

Having first been called to the first team by Vincenzo Italiano for the 20 November 2021 Serie A game against AC Milan, the young forward eventually made his professional debut for Fiorentina 10 days later, replacing José Callejón in the last minutes of a 3–1 Serie A home win against Sampdoria.

On 9 August 2023, Distefano moved on loan to Serie B club Ternana.

On 26 July 2024, Distefano was loaned by Frosinone.

On 14 July 2025, Distefano joined Carrarese in Serie B on loan.

On 21 July 2026, Distefano moved to Empoli in Serie B with a three-season contract.
