= Facundo González =

Uruguayan footballer (born 2003)

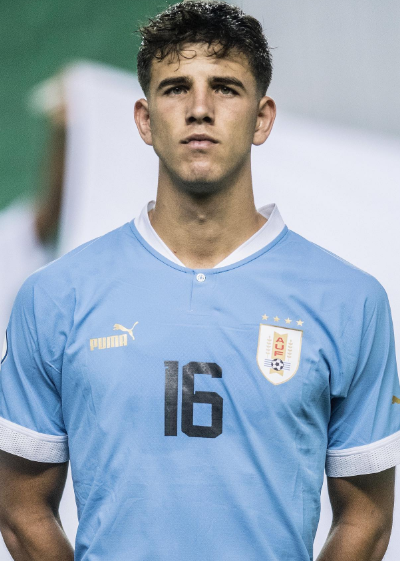
- González with Uruguay U20 in 2023

Personal information
- Full name: Facundo González Molino
- Date of birth: 6 June 2003 (age 23)
- Place of birth: Montevideo, Uruguay
- Height: 1.93 m (6 ft 4 in)
- Position: Centre-back

Team information
- Current team: Racing Santander
- Number: 16

Youth career
- –2011: Vista Alegre
- 2011–2019: Espanyol
- 2019–2020: Valencia

Senior career*
Years	Team	Apps	(Gls)
2020–2023	Valencia B	59	(4)
2023–2026	Juventus	0	(0)
2023–2024	→ Sampdoria (loan)	29	(2)
2024–2025	→ Feyenoord (loan)	6	(0)
2025–2026	→ Racing Santander (loan)	27	(1)
2026–	Racing Santander	1	(0)

International career
2022–2023	Uruguay U20	21	(1)
Medal record
Men's football
Representing Uruguay
FIFA U-20 World Cup
Winner	2023 Argentina
South American U-20 Championship
Runner-up	2023 Colombia
- * Club domestic league appearances and goals as of 16 August 2026

Facundo González Molino (born 6 June 2003) is a Uruguayan professional footballer who plays as a centre-back for La Liga club Racing Santander.

== Club career ==
=== Early career ===
As a youth player, González joined the youth academy of Spanish fifth tier side Vista Alegre. In 2019, he joined the youth academy of La Liga side Valencia.

=== Juventus ===
On 8 August 2023, González signed a three-year deal with Juventus.

==== Loan to Sampdoria ====
On 23 August 2023, González joined Serie B side Sampdoria on loan.

==== Loan to Feyenoord ====
On 29 August 2024, he moved to Eredivisie club Feyenoord on loan with an option to buy.

=== Racing de Santander ===
On 1 September 2025, González was announced at Segunda División side Racing de Santander on a one-year loan deal.

== International career ==
González is a Uruguayan youth international. In September 2022, he played for Uruguay under-20 team in Torneo Cuadrangular de Maldonado. He was a part of the Uruguayan side that won the 2023 FIFA U-20 World Cup in Argentina.

In June 2023, González received his first call-up to the senior team for friendlies against Nicaragua and Cuba.

== Career statistics ==
As of match played 16 March 2025

Appearances and goals by club, season and competition
Club	Season	League			National cup		Europe		Other		Total	
Club	Season	Division	Apps	Goals	Apps	Goals	Apps	Goals	Apps	Goals	Apps	Goals
Valencia Mestalla	2020–21	Segunda División B	20	0	—		—		—		20	0
Valencia Mestalla	2021–22	Tercera División RFEF	23	3	—		—		—		23	3
Valencia Mestalla	2022–23	Segunda Federación	17	1	—		—		—		17	1
Valencia Mestalla	Total		59	4	—		—		—		59	4
Sampdoria (loan)	2023–24	Serie B	28	2	1	0	—		1 (Note: Appearances in Serie B promotion play-offs)	0	30	2
Feyenoord (loan)	2024–25	Eredivisie	6	0	2	0	2 (Note: Appearances in UEFA Champions League)	0	—		10	0
Career total			94	6	3	0	2	0	1	0	100	6

== Honours ==
Valencia Mestalla

- Tercera División RFEF: 2021–22

Racing Santander

- Segunda División: 2025–26

Uruguay U20

- FIFA U-20 World Cup: 2023
- South American U-20 Championship runner-up: 2023
