= 2019–20 ACF Fiorentina season =

Fiorentina
2019–20 season
- Owner: Mediacom
- Chairman: Rocco B. Commisso
- Head coach: Vincenzo Montella (until 21 December); Giuseppe Iachini (from 23 December)
- Stadium: Stadio Artemio Franchi
- Serie A: 10th
- Coppa Italia: Quarter-finals
- Top goalscorer: League: Federico Chiesa (10); All: Federico Chiesa (11)
Home colours	Away colours	Third colours

The 2019–20 ACF Fiorentina season was the 93rd season in the club's history and their 82nd in the top-flight of Italian football. Having finished 16th the previous season, Fiorentina competed in Serie A and in the Coppa Italia. The season was the first one under the new owner Rocco Commisso, who purchased the club in June 2019.

== Players ==
=== Squad information ===
As of 8 February 2020
Appearances include league matches only

No.	Name	Nat	Position(s)	Date of birth (age)	Signed from	Signed in	Contract ends	Apps.	Goals	Notes
Goalkeepers
1	Pietro Terracciano	(Italy)	GK	8 March 1990 (age 35)	(Italy) Empoli	2019	2019	2	0	
33	Federico Brancolini	(Italy)	GK	14 July 2001 (age 24)	(Italy) Youth Sector	2017	2021	0	0	
69	Bartłomiej Drągowski	(Poland)	GK	19 August 1997 (age 28)	(Poland) Jagiellonia Białystok	2016	2021	30	0	
Defenders
3	Igor	(Brazil)	CB / LB / LM	7 February 1998 (age 28)	(Italy) SPAL	2020	2020	2	0	Loan
4	Nikola Milenković	(Serbia)	CB / RB	12 October 1997 (age 28)	(Serbia) Partizan	2017	2022	72	6	
15	Maximiliano Olivera	(Uruguay)	LB / CB / LM	5 March 1992 (age 33)	(Italy) Crotone	2016	2022	26	0	
17	Federico Ceccherini	(Italy)	CB	11 May 1992 (age 33)	(Italy) Crotone	2018	2022	22	0	
20	Germán Pezzella	(Argentina)	CB	27 June 1991 (age 34)	(Spain) Real Betis	2017	2022	86	5	
21	Pol Lirola	(Spain)	RB	13 August 1997 (age 28)	(Italy) Sassuolo	2019	2020	20	0	Loan
22	Martín Cáceres	(Uruguay)	CB	7 April 1987 (age 38)	(Italy) Lazio	2019	2020	17	1	
23	Lorenzo Venuti	(Italy)	RB	12 April 1995 (age 30)	(Italy) Youth Sector	2019	2021	7	0	
29	Dalbert	(Brazil)	LB	8 September 1993 (age 32)	(Italy) Internazionale	2019	2020	21	0	Loan
93	Aleksa Terzić	(Serbia)	LB	17 August 1999 (age 26)	(Serbia) Red Star Belgrade	2019	2023	0	0	
Midfielders
5	Milan Badelj	(Croatia)	DM / CM	25 February 1989 (age 37)	(Italy) Lazio	2019	2020	17	1	Loan
8	Gaetano Castrovilli	(Italy)	CM	17 February 1997 (age 29)	(Italy) Bari	2017	2021	21	3	
19	Kevin Agudelo	(Colombia)	CM / AM / LM	14 November 1998 (age 27)	(Italy) Genoa	2020	2021	1	0	Loan
24	Marco Benassi	(Italy)	CM	8 September 1994 (age 31)	(Italy) Torino	2017	2022	82	13	
78	Erick Pulgar	(Chile)	DM / CB / CM	15 January 1994 (age 32)	(Italy) Bologna	2019	2023	22	3	
88	Alfred Duncan	(Ghana)	CM / DM	10 March 1993 (age 32)	(Italy) Sassuolo	2020	2020	0	0	Loan
Forwards
7	Franck Ribéry	(France)	LW / LM / AM	7 April 1983 (age 42)	(Germany) Bayern Munich	2019	2021	11	2	
11	Riccardo Sottil	(Italy)	LW	3 June 1999 (age 26)	(Italy) Youth Sector	2018	2021	14	0	
18	Rachid Ghezzal	(Algeria)	RW / LW / AM	9 May 1992 (age 33)	(England) Leicester City	2019	2020	9	0	Loan
25	Federico Chiesa	(Italy)	AM / RW	25 October 1997 (age 28)	(Italy) Youth Sector	2016	2022	120	19	
28	Dušan Vlahović	(Serbia)	CF	28 January 2000 (age 26)	(Serbia) Partizan	2018	2023	29	4	
63	Patrick Cutrone	(Italy)	CF	3 January 1998 (age 28)	(England) Wolverhampton Wanderers	2020	2021	5	0	Loan
77	Cyril Théréau	(France)	CF	24 April 1983 (age 42)	(Italy) Udinese	2017	2020	22	5	
—	Christian Kouamé	(Ivory Coast)	CF / LW / RW	6 December 1997 (age 28)	(Italy) Genoa	2020	2020	0	0	Loan
Players transferred during the season
3	Cristiano Biraghi	(Italy)	LB	1 September 1992 (age 33)	(Italy) Pescara	2017	2021	70	2	
6	Luca Ranieri	(Italy)	CB	23 April 1999 (age 26)	(Italy) Youth Sector	2019	2021	3	0	
9	Giovanni Simeone	(Argentina)	CF / ST	5 July 1995 (age 30)	(Italy) Genoa	2017	2022	74	20	
9	Pedro	(Brazil)	CF	20 June 1997 (age 28)	(Brazil) Fluminense	2019	2024	4	0	
10	Kevin-Prince Boateng	(Ghana)	CF / AM / CM	6 March 1987 (age 38)	(Italy) Sassuolo	2019	2021	14	1	
14	Bryan Dabo	(Burkina Faso)	CM	13 February 1992 (age 34)	(France) Saint-Étienne	2018	2021	33	2	
15	Sebastián Cristóforo	(Uruguay)	CM	23 August 1993 (age 32)	(Spain) Sevilla	2017	2021	36	1	
16	Valentin Eysseric	(France)	AM	25 March 1992 (age 33)	(France) Nice	2017	2022	34	1	
19	Cristóbal Montiel	(Spain)	AM / LW	11 April 2000 (age 25)	(Italy) Youth Sector	2019	2023	1	0	
26	Bobby Duncan	(England)	CF	26 June 2001 (age 24)	(England) Liverpool	2019	2022	0	0	
27	Szymon Żurkowski	(Poland)	CM	25 September 1997 (age 28)	(Poland) Górnik Zabrze	2019	2023	2	0	
30	Andrés Schetino	(Uruguay)	DM	26 May 1994 (age 31)	(Uruguay) Fénix	2016	2020	0	0	
32	Jacob Rasmussen	(Denmark)	CB	28 May 1997 (age 28)	(Italy) Empoli	2019	2023	0	0	
35	Gabriele Gori	(Italy)	CF	13 February 1999 (age 27)	(Italy) Youth Sector	2019	2021	0	0	

== Transfers ==
=== In ===
Date	Pos.	Player	Age	Moving from	Fee	Notes	Source
13 June 2019	DF	(Serbia) Aleksa Terzić	19	(Serbia) Red Star Belgrade	Undisclosed	Transfer	
1 July 2019	GK	(Poland) Bartłomiej Drągowski	21	(Italy) Empoli	Free	Loan return	
1 July 2019	GK	(Italy) Michele Cerofolini	20	(Italy) Bisceglie	Free	Loan return	
1 July 2019	DF	(Italy) Pierluigi Pinto	20	(Italy) Arezzo	Free	Loan return	
1 July 2019	DF	(Italy) Lorenzo Venuti	23	(Italy) Lecce	Free	Loan return	
1 July 2019	DF	(Italy) Luca Mosti	21	(Italy) Bisceglie	Free	Loan return	
1 July 2019	DF	(Italy) Luca Zanon	22	(Italy) Siena	Free	Loan return	
1 July 2019	DF	(Italy) Luca Ranieri	20	(Italy) Foggia	Free	Loan return	
1 July 2019	DF	(Denmark) Jacob Rasmussen	22	(Italy) Empoli	Free	Loan return	
1 July 2019	DF	(Bulgaria) Petko Hristov	20	(Italy) Ternana	Free	Loan return	
1 July 2019	MF	(Ghana) Amidu Salifu	26	(Italy) Arezzo	Free	Loan return	
1 July 2019	MF	(France) Valentin Eysseric	27	(France) Nantes	Free	Loan return	
1 July 2019	MF	(Poland) Szymon Żurkowski	21	(Poland) Górnik Zabrze	Free	Loan return	
1 July 2019	MF	(Uruguay) Andrés Schetino	24	(Italy) Cosenza	Free	Loan return	
1 July 2019	MF	(Italy) Marco Marozzi	20	(Italy) Fermana	Free	Loan return	
1 July 2019	MF	(Democratic Republic of the Congo) Luzayadio Bangu	21	(Italy) Bisceglie	Free	Loan return	
1 July 2019	MF	(Italy) Gaetano Castrovilli	22	(Italy) Cremonese	Free	Loan return	
1 July 2019	MF	(Uruguay) Sebastián Cristóforo	25	(Spain) Getafe	Free	Loan return	
1 July 2019	MF	(Italy) Riccardo Saponara	27	(Italy) Sampdoria	Free	Loan return	
1 July 2019	FW	(Norway) Rafik Zekhnini	21	(Netherlands) Twente	Free	Loan return	
1 July 2019	FW	(Italy) Gabriele Gori	20	(Italy) Livorno	Free	Loan return	
1 July 2019	FW	(France) Cyril Théréau	35	(Italy) Cagliari	Free	Loan return	
1 July 2019	FW	(Italy) Riccardo Sottil	20	(Italy) Pescara	Free	Loan return	
1 July 2019	FW	(Uruguay) Jaime Báez	23	(Italy) Cosenza	Free	Loan return	
7 July 2019	GK	(Italy) Pietro Terracciano	29	(Italy) Empoli	Undisclosed	Previously on loan	
15 July 2019	DF	(Italy) Riccardo Baroni	20	(Italy) Virtus Entella	£360k		
31 July 2019	MF	(Ghana) Kevin-Prince Boateng	32	(Italy) Sassuolo	€1M		
9 August 2019	MF	(Chile) Erick Pulgar	25	(Italy) Bologna	€9M		
21 August 2019	FW	(France) Franck Ribéry	36	(Germany) Bayern Munich	Free		
30 August 2019	DF	(Uruguay) Martín Cáceres	32	(Italy) Lazio	Free		
1 September 2019	DF	(Netherlands) Kevin Diks	22	(Italy) Empoli	Free	Loan return	
2 September 2019	FW	(Brazil) Pedro	22	(Brazil) Fluminense	€9.9M		
2 September 2019	FW	(England) Bobby Duncan	18	(England) Liverpool	€2M		

==== Loans in ====
Date	Pos.	Player	Age	Moving from	Fee	Notes	Source
1 August 2019	DF	(Spain) Pol Lirola	21	(Italy) Sassuolo	€1M Loan Fee	Loan with an obligation to buy for €12M	
5 August 2019	MD	(Croatia) Milan Badelj	30	(Italy) Lazio	€700,000	Option to buy	
29 August 2019	DF	(Brazil) Dalbert	25	(Italy) Internazionale	Loan		
2 September 2019	FW	(Algeria) Rachid Ghezzal	27	(England) Leicester City	Loan	Option to buy	

=== Out ===
Date	Pos.	Player	Age	Moving to	Fee	Notes	Source
28 May 2019	MF	(Denmark) Christian Nørgaard	25	(England) Brentford	€3.15M		
1 July 2019	GK	(Italy) Pietro Terracciano	29	(Italy) Empoli	Free	Loan return	
1 July 2019	MF	(Switzerland) Edimilson Fernandes	23	(England) West Ham United	Free	Loan return	
1 July 2019	MF	(Brazil) Gerson	22	(Italy) Roma	Free	Loan return	
1 July 2019	FW	(Colombia) Luis Muriel	28	(Spain) Sevilla	Free	Loan return	
1 July 2019	FW	(Belgium) Kevin Mirallas	31	(England) Everton	Free	Loan return	
1 July 2019	FW	(Croatia) Marko Pjaca	24	(Italy) Juventus	Free	Loan return	
8 July 2019	DF	(France) Vincent Laurini	30	(Italy) Parma	€900K		
23 July 2019	DF	(Italy) Luca Zanon	23	(Italy) Pordenone	Undisclosed		
23 July 2019	DF	(Italy) Luca Mosti	21	(Italy) Arezzo	Undisclosed	Sold with buy-back option	
30 July 2019	DF	(Brazil) Vitor Hugo	28	(Brazil) Palmeiras	€5.5M		
1 August 2019	MF	(Italy) Simone Minelli	22	(Italy) Teramo	Free		
2 August 2019	FW	(Uruguay) Jaime Báez	24	(Italy) Cosenza	Free		
20 August 2019	MF	(Democratic Republic of the Congo) Luzayadio Bangu	21	(Italy) Gubbio	Undisclosed	Sold with buy-back option	

==== Loans out ====
Date	Pos.	Player	Age	Moving to	Fee	Notes	Source
29 June 2019	GK	(France) Alban Lafont	20	(France) Nantes	Loan	Two-season loan	
3 July 2019	MF	(Ghana) Amidu Salifu	26	(Kuwait) Al-Salmiya	Loan		
5 July 2019	FW	(Norway) Rafik Zekhnini	21	(Netherlands) Twente	Loan	Second consecutive loan to Twente	
10 July 2019	FW	(Czech Republic) Martin Graiciar	20	(Czech Republic) Sparta Prague	Loan	Option to buy	
19 July 2019	GK	(Italy) Simone Ghidotti	19	(Italy) Pergolettese	Loan		
20 July 2019	MF	(France) Jordan Veretout	26	(Italy) Roma	Loan	Loan with an obligation to buy for €17M	
20 July 2019	FW	(Italy) Mattia Trovato	21	(Italy) Cosenza	Loan	Two-year loan with Buy-option with buy-back option	
1 August 2019	MF	(Italy) Marco Meli	19	(Italy) Gubbio	Loan		
1 August 2019	MF	(Albania) Erald Lakti	19	(Italy) Gubbio	Loan		
2 August 2019	FW	(Italy) Salvatore Longo	19	(Italy) Bisceglie	Loan		
3 August 2019	DF	(Slovakia) Dávid Hancko	21	(Czech Republic) Sparta Prague	Loan		
7 August 2019	MF	(Italy) Riccardo Saponara	27	(Italy) Genoa	Loan	Option to buy	
9 August 2019	DF	(Bulgaria) Petko Hristov	20	(Italy) Bisceglie	Loan		
19 August 2019	MF	(Italy) Marco Marozzi	20	(Italy) Virtus Francavilla	Loan		
20 August 2019	DF	(Argentina) Julián Illanes	22	(Italy) Avellino	Loan		
21 August 2019	MF	(Switzerland) Nicky Beloko	19	(Belgium) Gent	Loan	Option to buy	
29 August 2019	DF	(Italy) Cristiano Biraghi	26	(Italy) Internazionale	Loan	Option to buy for €12M	
29 August 2019	DF	(Italy) Pierluigi Pinto	20	(Italy) Salernitana	Loan	Option to buy with buy-back option	
29 August 2019	DF	(Italy) Gabriele Ferrarini	19	(Italy) Pistoiese	Loan		
30 August 2019	FW	(Argentina) Giovanni Simeone	24	(Italy) Cagliari	Loan	Loan with an obligation to buy for €16M	
2 September 2019	FW	(Croatia) Josip Maganjić	20	(Croatia) Istra	Loan		
2 September 2019	DF	(Italy) Riccardo Baroni	20	(Italy) Siena	Loan		
2 September 2019	DF	(Netherlands) Kevin Diks	22	(Denmark) Aarhus	Loan	Option to buy	
2 September 2019	FW	(Italy) Gabriele Gori	20	(Italy) Arezzo	Loan		

== Pre-season and friendlies ==
10 July 2019 Friendly	Fiorentina (Italy)	21–0	(Italy) Val di Fassa	Moena, Italy
	Benassi 4'; Vlahović 15', 20', 37'; Montiel 16'; Saponara 22'; Ranieri 24'; Meli 42', 82', 87', 91'; Sottil 50', 64', 89'; Simeone 51', 72'; Hancko 59', 76'; Báez 61', 69'; Eysseric 90'	Report

16 July 2019 ICC	Fiorentina (Italy)	2–1	(Mexico) Guadalajara	Bridgeview, United States
20:00 CDT	Simeone 27', (yellow card) 49'; Terzić (yellow card) 35'; Ranieri (yellow card) 45'; Sottil 52'; Ceccherini (yellow card) 70'; Lakti (yellow card) 78'	Report	López 25'; Sánchez (yellow card) 26'; Huerta (yellow card) 88'	Stadium: SeatGeek Stadium; Attendance: 10,062; Referee: Rubiel Vazquez (United States)

20 July 2019 ICC	Arsenal (England)	3–0	(Italy) Fiorentina	Charlotte, United States
18:00 EDT	Nketiah 15', 65'; Maitland-Niles (yellow card) 82'; Willock 89'	Report	Saponara (yellow card) 43'; Terracciano (yellow card) 56'	Stadium: Bank of America Stadium; Attendance: 34,902; Referee: Marcos de Oliveira (United States)

25 July 2019 ICC	Fiorentina (Italy)	1–2	(Portugal) Benfica	Harrison, United States
20:00 EDT	Vlahović 29'; Ranieri (yellow card) 50'; Biraghi (yellow card) 67'	Report	Seferovic 9'; Dias (yellow card) 39'; Silva (yellow card) 48'; Gabriel (yellow card) 57'; Caio 90+3'	Stadium: Red Bull Arena; Attendance: 12,141; Referee: Robert Sibiga (United States)

3 August 2019 Friendly	Livorno (Italy)	0–1	(Italy) Fiorentina	Livorno, Italy
21:00 CEST		Report	Sottil 15'	Stadium: Stadio Armando Picchi

11 August 2019 Friendly	Fiorentina (Italy)	4–1	(Turkey) Galatasaray	Florence, Italy
21:00 CEST	Boateng 42' (pen.); Sottil 45+3'; Castrovilli (yellow card) 55'; Biraghi (yellow card) 59'; Benassi 61'; Simeone 83'	Report	Marcão (yellow card) 22'; Mor 50'	Stadium: Stadio Artemio Franchi; Referee: Rosario Abisso (Italy)

6 September 2019 Friendly	Fiorentina (Italy)	1–0	(Italy) Perugia	Florence, Italy
20:00 CEST	Montiel 28'	Report		Stadium: Stadio Artemio Franchi

11 October 2019 Friendly	Pistoiese (Italy)	1–4	(Italy) Fiorentina	Pistoia, Italy
19:00 CEST	Gucci 25'	Report	Boateng 2', 56'; Eysseric 34'; Koffi 41'	Stadium: Stadio Marcello Melani; Attendance: 1,509

16 November 2019 Friendly	Fiorentina (Italy)	5–1	(Italy) Virtus Entella	Florence, Italy
15:00 CET	Ghezzal 4', 65'; Benassi 20'; Boateng 34'; Lirola 73'	Report	De Luca 85'	Stadium: Stadio Artemio Franchi; Attendance: 500

== Competitions ==
=== Serie A ===
==== League table ====
Pos	Team	Pld	W	D	L	GF	GA	GD	Pts
8	Sassuolo	38	14	9	15	69	63	+6	51
9	Hellas Verona	38	12	13	13	47	51	−4	49 (Note: Positions determined by head-to-head points: Hellas Verona: 10 pts; Fiorentina: 5 pts; Parma: 1 pt.)
10	Fiorentina	38	12	13	13	51	48	+3	49
11	Parma	38	14	7	17	56	57	−1	49
12	Bologna	38	12	11	15	52	65	−13	47

Source: Serie A, Soccerway
Rules for classification: 1) Points; 2) Head-to-head points; 3) Head-to-head goal difference; 4) Goal difference; 5) Goals scored; 6) Draw. (Note: Head-to-head record is used only after all the matches between the teams in question have been played)

==== Results summary ====
Overall								Home						Away					
Pld	W	D	L	GF	GA	GD	Pts	W	D	L	GF	GA	GD	W	D	L	GF	GA	GD
38	12	13	13	51	48	+3	49	5	8	6	22	22	0	7	5	7	29	26	+3

Last updated: 2 August 2020.
Source: Competitive matches

==== Results by round ====
Round	1	2	3	4	5	6	7	8	9	10	11	12	13	14	15	16	17	18	19	20	21	22	23	24	25	26	27	28	29	30	31	32	33	34	35	36	37	38
Ground	H	A	H	A	H	A	H	A	H	A	H	A	A	H	A	H	H	A	H	A	H	A	H	A	H	A	H	A	H	A	H	H	A	H	A	A	H	A
Result	L	L	D	D	W	W	W	D	L	W	D	L	L	L	L	D	L	D	W	W	D	L	L	W	D	D	D	L	L	W	D	D	W	W	D	L	W	W
Position	13	16	19	20	15	10	8	9	9	8	8	9	10	13	13	13	15	15	14	13	13	14	14	13	13	13	13	13	13	13	13	13	13	12	11	12	10	10

Updated to match(es) played on 2 August 2020. Source: Competitive matches
A = Away; H = Home; W = Win; D = Draw; L = Loss

==== Matches ====
24 August 2019 1	Fiorentina	3–4	Napoli	Florence
20:45 CEST (UTC+02:00)	Pulgar 9' (pen.); Milenković 52'; Boateng 65', (yellow card) 90+3'; Pezzella (yellow card) 90+5'	Report	Allan (yellow card) 19'; Callejón (yellow card) 20', (goal) 56'; Mário Rui (yellow card) 24'; Mertens 38'; Insigne 43' (pen.), 67'; Zieliński (yellow card) 90+1'	Stadium: Stadio Artemio Franchi; Attendance: 33,614; Referee: Davide Massa

1 September 2019 2	Genoa	2–1	Fiorentina	Genoa
20:45 CEST (UTC+02:00)	Zapata 11'; Romero (yellow card) 16'; Criscito (yellow card) 45'; Kouamé 65'	Report	Pulgar 76' (pen.)	Stadium: Stadio Luigi Ferraris; Attendance: 20,000; Referee: Piero Giacomelli

14 September 2019 3	Fiorentina	0–0	Juventus	Florence
15:00 CEST (UTC+02:00)	Cáceres (yellow card) 10'; Chiesa (yellow card) 37'; Castrovilli (yellow card) 77'	Report	Pjanić (yellow card) 14'; De Ligt (yellow card) 46'; Bentancur (yellow card) 82'	Stadium: Stadio Artemio Franchi; Attendance: 40,312; Referee: Massimiliano Irrati

22 September 2019 4	Atalanta	2–2	Fiorentina	Bergamo
18:00 CEST (UTC+02:00)	Pašalić (yellow card) 8'; De Roon (yellow card) 76'; Iličić 84'; Castagne 90+5'	Report	Pezzella (yellow card) 1'; Palomino 24' (o.g.); Lirola (yellow card) 46'; Milenković (yellow card) 52'; Ribéry 66'; Boateng (yellow card) 88'; Drągowski (yellow card) 90'	Stadium: Gewiss Stadium; Attendance: 10,314; Referee: Daniele Orsato

25 September 2019 5	Fiorentina	2–1	Sampdoria	Florence
21:00 CEST (UTC+02:00)	Pezzella 31'; Dalbert (yellow card) 47'; Chiesa 57'; Lirola (yellow card) 88'; Sottil (yellow card) 90+2'; Pulgar (yellow card) 90+5'	Report	Bereszyński (yellow card) 22'; Vieira (yellow card) 39'; Murillo (yellow card) 43' (yellow-red card) 54'; Depaoli (yellow card) 76'; Bonazzoli 79'	Stadium: Stadio Artemio Franchi; Attendance: 33,469; Referee: Daniele Doveri

29 September 2019 6	Milan	1–3	Fiorentina	Milan
20:45 CEST (UTC+02:00)	Bennacer (yellow card) 13'; Musacchio (red card) 55'; Leão 80'; Calabria (yellow card) 86'	Report	Pulgar 14' (pen.); Milenković (yellow card) 35'; Pezzella (yellow card) 49'; Castrovilli 66'; Ribéry 78'; Lirola (yellow card) 86'; Benassi (yellow card) 87'	Stadium: San Siro; Attendance: 48,367; Referee: Piero Giacomelli

6 October 2019 7	Fiorentina	1–0	Udinese	Florence
12:30 CEST (UTC+02:00)	Castrovilli (yellow card) 39'; Milenković 72'	Report	Samir (yellow card) 55'; Opoku (yellow card) 74'	Stadium: Stadio Artemio Franchi; Attendance: 37,963; Referee: Alessandro Prontera

21 October 2019 8	Brescia	0–0	Fiorentina	Brescia
20:45 CEST (UTC+02:00)		Report	Pulgar (yellow card) 53'; Chiesa (yellow card) 66'; Ribéry (yellow card) 77'	Stadium: Stadio Mario Rigamonti; Attendance: 16,000; Referee: Gianpaolo Calvarese

27 October 2019 9	Fiorentina	1–2	Lazio	Florence
20:45 CET (UTC+01:00)	Chiesa 28'; Ranieri (yellow card) 41' (yellow-red card) 90+6'; Castrovilli (yellow card) 68'; Pulgar (yellow card) 73'; Pezzella (yellow card) 90+2'; Ribéry (red card) 90+7'	Report	Correa 22'; Luis Alberto (yellow card) 43'; Lulić (yellow card) 45+2'; Immobile 89'; Parolo (yellow card) 90+4'; Vavro (red card) 90+8'	Stadium: Stadio Artemio Franchi; Attendance: 33,281; Referee: Marco Guida
Note: Franck Ribéry and Denis Vavro were sent off for fighting after the end of the match.

30 October 2019 10	Sassuolo	1–2	Fiorentina	Reggio Emilia
21:00 CET (UTC+01:00)	Boga 24'; Caputo (yellow card) 30'; Đuričić (yellow card) 51'; Berardi (yellow card) 68'	Report	Venuti (yellow card) 13'; Pezzella (yellow card) 42'; Castrovilli 63', (yellow card) 89'; Dalbert (yellow card) 71'; Milenković 81'	Stadium: Mapei Stadium – Città del Tricolore; Attendance: 11,863; Referee: Maurizio Mariani

3 November 2019 11	Fiorentina	1–1	Parma	Florence
18:00 CET (UTC+01:00)	Dalbert (yellow card) 55'; Castrovilli 67'; Pulgar (yellow card) 71'	Report	Pezzella (yellow card) 28'; Darmian (yellow card) 39'; Gervinho 40'	Stadium: Stadio Artemio Franchi; Attendance: 32,479; Referee: Luca Pairetto

10 November 2019 12	Cagliari	5–2	Fiorentina	Cagliari
12:30 CET (UTC+01:00)	Rog 17'; Pisacane 26'; Simeone 34'; João Pedro 54'; Nainggolan 65'; Nández (yellow card) 69'	Report	Castrovilli (yellow card) 21'; Pulgar (yellow card) 42'; Vlahović 75', 87'; Sottil (yellow card) 77'	Stadium: Sardegna Arena; Attendance: 16,316; Referee: Federico La Penna

24 November 2019 13	Hellas Verona	1–0	Fiorentina	Verona
15:00 CET (UTC+01:00)	Di Carmine (yellow card) 3', (goal) 66'; Pessina (yellow card) 19'; Faraoni (yellow card) 61'	Report	Venuti (yellow card) 57'; Milenković (yellow card) 60'	Stadium: Stadio Marc'Antonio Bentegodi; Attendance: 22,581; Referee: Antonio Giua

30 November 2019 14	Fiorentina	0–1	Lecce	Florence
20:45 CET (UTC+01:00)	Castrovilli (yellow card) 67'	Report	Rispoli (yellow card) 29'; La Mantia 49'; Petriccione (yellow card) 60'; Rossettini (yellow card) 69'	Stadium: Stadio Artemio Franchi; Attendance: 33,912; Referee: Marco Piccinini

8 December 2019 15	Torino	2–1	Fiorentina	Turin
15:00 CET (UTC+01:00)	Zaza 22'; Aina (yellow card) 32'; Baselli (yellow card) 41'; Rincón (yellow card) 61'; Ansaldi 72'; Izzo (yellow card) 90+2'	Report	Chiesa (yellow card) 31'; Cáceres (yellow card) 49', (goal) 90+1'; Vlahović (yellow card) 69'	Stadium: Stadio Olimpico Grande Torino; Attendance: 19,955; Referee: Piero Giacomelli

15 December 2019 16	Fiorentina	1–1	Internazionale	Florence
20:45 CET (UTC+01:00)	Badelj (yellow card) 52'; Dalbert (yellow card) 69'; Pulgar (yellow card) 80'; Vlahović 90+2'	Report	Valero 8', (yellow card) 73'; Brozović (yellow card) 27'; Bastoni (yellow card) 32'; Martínez (yellow card) 76'	Stadium: Stadio Artemio Franchi; Attendance: 37,537; Referee: Maurizio Mariani

20 December 2019 17	Fiorentina	1–4	Roma	Florence
20:45 CET (UTC+01:00)	Pezzella (yellow card) 21'; Badelj 34'; Cáceres (yellow card) 45+1'; Castrovilli (yellow card) 64'; Vlahović (yellow card) 89'	Report	Džeko 19'; Kolarov 21', (yellow card) 45+2'; Zaniolo (yellow card) 38', (goal) 88'; Diawara (yellow card) 57'; Pellegrini 73'	Stadium: Stadio Artemio Franchi; Attendance: 33,055; Referee: Daniele Orsato

6 January 2020 18	Bologna	1–1	Fiorentina	Bologna
12:30 CET (UTC+01:00)	Medel (yellow card) 40'; Bani (yellow card) 77'; Orsolini 90+4'	Report	Benassi 27'; Milenković (yellow card) 38'; Lirola (yellow card) 45+1'; Cáceres (yellow card) 54'; Pulgar (yellow card) 69'	Stadium: Stadio Renato Dall'Ara; Attendance: 22,653; Referee: Paolo Valeri

12 January 2020 19	Fiorentina	1–0	SPAL	Florence
15:00 CET (UTC+01:00)	Pezzella (yellow card) 38', (goal) 82'	Report	Murgia (yellow card) 79'	Stadium: Stadio Artemio Franchi; Attendance: 33,970; Referee: Daniele Doveri

18 January 2020 20	Napoli	0–2	Fiorentina	Naples
20:45 CET (UTC+01:00)	Hysaj (yellow card) 61'; Demme (yellow card) 66'	Report	Chiesa 26'; Vlahović 74'; Dalbert (yellow card) 84'	Stadium: Stadio San Paolo; Attendance: 22,219; Referee: Fabrizio Pasqua

25 January 2020 21	Fiorentina	0–0	Genoa	Florence
18:00 CET (UTC+01:00)	Pezzella (yellow card) 14'; Milenković (yellow card) 38'; Venuti (yellow card) 75'; Cáceres (yellow card) 90+4'	Report	Schöne (yellow card) 31'; Favilli (yellow card) 39'; Sturaro (yellow card) 90+2'	Stadium: Stadio Artemio Franchi; Attendance: 32,903; Referee: Daniele Orsato

2 February 2020 22	Juventus	3–0	Fiorentina	Turin
12:30 CET (UTC+01:00)	Bonucci (yellow card) 35'; Ronaldo 40' (pen.), 80' (pen.); De Ligt 90+1'	Report	Chiesa (yellow card) 33'; Pezzella (yellow card) 39'; Ghezzal (yellow card) 50'; Ceccherini (yellow card) 80'	Stadium: Allianz Stadium; Attendance: 39,408; Referee: Fabrizio Pasqua

8 February 2020 23	Fiorentina	1–2	Atalanta	Florence
15:00 CET (UTC+01:00)	Castrovilli (yellow card) 16'; Chiesa 32'; Vlahović (yellow card) 60'	Report	Zapata (yellow card) 27', (goal) 49'; Gollini (yellow card) 33'; Malinovskyi 72'	Stadium: Stadio Artemio Franchi; Attendance: 35,034; Referee: Maurizio Mariani

16 February 2020 24	Sampdoria	1–5	Fiorentina	Genoa
15:00 CET (UTC+01:00)	Murru (yellow card) 19' (yellow-red card) 39'; Ramírez (yellow card) 22'; Colley (yellow card) 53'; Depaoli (yellow card) 86'; Gabbiadini 90'	Report	Thorsby 8' (o.g.); Vlahović 18' (pen.), 57', (yellow card) 20'; Badelj (yellow card) 35' (yellow-red card) 45'; Chiesa 40' (pen.), 78'; Duncan (yellow card) 45+1'	Stadium: Stadio Luigi Ferraris; Attendance: 20,284; Referee: Massimiliano Irrati

22 February 2020 25	Fiorentina	1–1	Milan	Florence
20:45 CET (UTC+01:00)	Dalbert (red card) 62'; Cáceres (yellow card) 76'; Pulgar 85' (pen.)	Report	Bennacer (yellow card) 12'; Çalhanoğlu (yellow card) 25'; Rebić 56'; Hernandez (yellow card) 85'	Stadium: Stadio Artemio Franchi; Attendance: 39,769; Referee: Gianpaolo Calvarese

8 March 2020 26	Udinese	0–0	Fiorentina	Udine
18:00 CET (UTC+01:00)	Nestorovski (yellow card) 18'; Sema (yellow card) 77'	Report		Stadium: Dacia Arena; Attendance: 0 Referee: Michael Fabbri
Note: Match was initially postponed to 13 May from its original date of 1 March due to concerns over the COVID-19 pandemic, but was later moved to 8 March to be played behind closed doors.

22 June 2020 27	Fiorentina	1–1	Brescia	Florence
19:30 CEST (UTC+02:00)	Cáceres (yellow card) 15' (yellow-red card) 70'; Ceccherini (yellow card) 22'; Pezzella 29'; Dalbert (yellow card) 32'; Chiesa (yellow card) 87'	Report	Donnarumma 17' (pen.); Papetti (yellow card) 61'; Semprini (yellow card) 75'; Špalek (yellow card) 82'; Torregrossa (yellow card) 86'	Stadium: Stadio Artemio Franchi; Attendance: 0 Referee: Federico La Penna
Note: Match was postponed to 15 March, then to 22 June, from its original date of 8 March due to schedule shuffling to allow for Udinese vs Fiorentina to be played following its previous postponement due to concerns over the COVID-19 pandemic. All subsequent matches were also shuffled to allow for this accommodation. On 9 March, all sports events in Italy were suspended until 3 April. This was the first match played since the COVID-19 pandemic lockdown in Italy.

27 June 2020 28	Lazio	2–1	Fiorentina	Rome
21:45 CEST (UTC+02:00)	Parolo (yellow card) 7'; Milinković-Savić (yellow card) 24'; Bastos (yellow card) 45'; Jony (yellow card) 55'; Immobile 67' (pen.); Radu (yellow card) 79'; Luis Alberto 83'	Report	Dalbert (yellow card) 5'; Ribéry 25'; Milenković (yellow card) 32'; Vlahović (red card) 90+5'	Stadium: Stadio Olimpico; Attendance: 0 Referee: Michael Fabbri

1 July 2020 29	Fiorentina	1–3	Sassuolo	Florence
21:45 CEST (UTC+02:00)	Pulgar (yellow card) 44'; Ceccherini (yellow card) 51'; Castrovilli (yellow card) 63'; Ghezzal (yellow card) 73'; Cutrone 90'	Report	Rogério (yellow card) 4'; Defrel 24' (pen.), 35'; Traorè (yellow card) 43'; Müldür 61'	Stadium: Stadio Artemio Franchi; Attendance: 0 Referee: Daniele Chiffi

5 July 2020 30	Parma	1–2	Fiorentina	Parma
19:30 CEST (UTC+02:00)	Brugman (yellow card) 38'; Kulusevski (yellow card) 39'; Kucka (yellow card) 41', (goal) 49' (pen.); Kurtić (yellow card) 89'	Report	Pulgar 19' (pen.), 31' (pen.); Venuti (yellow card) 32'; Pezzella (yellow card) 49'; Igor (yellow card) 52'; Milenković (yellow card) 63'; Cutrone (yellow card) 79'; Sottil (yellow card) 90+5'	Stadium: Stadio Ennio Tardini; Attendance: 0 Referee: Rosario Abisso

8 July 2020 31	Fiorentina	0–0	Cagliari	Florence
19:30 CEST (UTC+02:00)	Chiesa (yellow card) 9'; Duncan (yellow card) 80'	Report	Mattiello (yellow card) 71'; Lykogiannis (yellow card) 90+2'	Stadium: Stadio Artemio Franchi; Attendance: 0 Referee: Gianluca Manganiello

12 July 2020 32	Fiorentina	1–1	Hellas Verona	Florence
19:30 CEST (UTC+02:00)	Pulgar (yellow card) 28'; Igor (yellow card) 51'; Milenković (yellow card) 63'; Cutrone 90+6'	Report	Faraoni 18'; Stępiński (yellow card) 88'	Stadium: Stadio Artemio Franchi; Attendance: 0 Referee: Daniele Chiffi

15 July 2020 33	Lecce	1–3	Fiorentina	Lecce
21:45 CEST (UTC+02:00)	Gabriel (yellow card) 10'; Babacar (yellow card) 21'; Donati (yellow card) 36'; Shakhov 88'	Report	Chiesa 6'; Ribéry (yellow card) 10'; Ghezzal (yellow card) 27', (goal) 38'; Cutrone 40'	Stadium: Stadio Via del Mare; Attendance: 0 Referee: Marco Guida

19 July 2020 34	Fiorentina	2–0	Torino	Florence
19:30 CEST (UTC+02:00)	Lyanco 2' (o.g.); Pezzella (yellow card) 44'; Cutrone 75'	Report	Lyanco (yellow card) 5'; Lukić (yellow card) 36'	Stadium: Stadio Artemio Franchi; Attendance: 0 Referee: Maurizio Mariani

22 July 2020 35	Internazionale	0–0	Fiorentina	Milan
21:45 CEST (UTC+02:00)	Barella (yellow card) 76'	Report	Ribéry (yellow card) 43'; Castrovilli (yellow card) 57'; Cáceres (yellow card) 79'	Stadium: San Siro; Attendance: 0 Referee: Piero Giacomelli

26 July 2020 36	Roma	2–1	Fiorentina	Rome
19:30 CEST (UTC+02:00)	Veretout 45' (pen.); Džeko 87' (pen.); Mancini (yellow card) 90+6'	Report	Pezzella (yellow card) 35'; Milenković 54', (yellow card) 90+3'; Cáceres (yellow card) 72'; Ghezzal (yellow card) 86'	Stadium: Stadio Olimpico; Attendance: 0 Referee: Daniele Chiffi

29 July 2020 37	Fiorentina	4–0	Bologna	Florence
21:45 CEST (UTC+02:00)	Ghezzal (yellow card) 29'; Chiesa 48', 54', 89'; Milenković 74'; Dalbert (yellow card) 81'	Report	Corbo (yellow card) 80'	Stadium: Stadio Artemio Franchi; Attendance: 0 Referee: Marco Di Bello

2 August 2020 38	SPAL	1–3	Fiorentina	Ferrara
18:00 CEST (UTC+02:00)	D'Alessandro 39'; Farès (yellow card) 45+2'	Report	Duncan 30'; Kouamé 89'; Chiesa (yellow card) 90+2'; Pulgar 90+3' (pen.)	Stadium: Stadio Paolo Mazza; Attendance: 0 Referee: Alessandro Prontera

=== Coppa Italia ===
18 August 2019 Third round	Fiorentina	3–1	Monza	Florence
18:15 CEST (UTC+02:00)	Terzić (yellow card) 29'; Ranieri (yellow card) 71'; Vlahović 80', 86', (yellow card) 87'; Chiesa 89'	Report	Sampirisi (yellow card) 33'; Brighenti 34'; Scaglia (yellow card) 39'; Bellusci (yellow card) 44'; Iocolano (yellow card) 85'	Stadium: Stadio Artemio Franchi; Attendance: 15,000; Referee: Fabrizio Pasqua

3 December 2019 Fourth round	Fiorentina	2–0	Cittadella	Florence
21:00 CET (UTC+01:00)	Benassi 21', 53'; Venuti (red card) 27'; Castrovilli (yellow card) 64'; Pulgar (yellow card) 90+4'	Report	Bussaglia (yellow card) 10'; Iori (yellow card) 39'	Stadium: Stadio Artemio Franchi; Attendance: 8,988; Referee: Ivano Pezzuto

15 January 2020 Round of 16	Fiorentina	2–1	Atalanta	Florence
15:00 CET (UTC+01:00)	Cutrone 11'; Pezzella (yellow card) 45+1' (yellow-red card) 70'; Dalbert (yellow card) 81'; Lirola 84'	Report	Caldara (yellow card) 34'; Djimsiti (yellow card) 50'; Iličić 67'	Stadium: Stadio Artemio Franchi; Attendance: 13,395; Referee: Gianluca Manganiello

29 January 2020 Quarter-finals	Internazionale	2–1	Fiorentina	Milan
20:45 CET (UTC+01:00)	Candreva 44'; Barella 67'	Report	Cáceres (yellow card) 45', (goal) 60'; Dalbert (yellow card) 65'; Sottil (yellow card) 89'	Stadium: San Siro; Attendance: 51,431; Referee: Daniele Doveri

== Statistics ==
=== Appearances and goals ===
No.	Pos	Nat	Player	Total		Serie A		Coppa Italia	
No.	Pos	Nat	Player	Apps	Goals	Apps	Goals	Apps	Goals
Goalkeepers
1	GK	(Italy) ITA	Pietro Terracciano	10	0	7	0	3	0
33	GK	(Italy) ITA	Federico Brancolini	1	0	0+1	0	0	0
69	GK	(Poland) POL	Bartłomiej Drągowski	32	0	31	0	1	0
Defenders
3	DF	(Brazil) BRA	Igor	9	0	6+3	0	0	0
4	DF	(Serbia) SRB	Nikola Milenković	41	5	36+1	5	4	0
17	DF	(Italy) ITA	Federico Ceccherini	17	0	8+7	0	2	0
20	DF	(Argentina) ARG	Germán Pezzella	34	3	33	3	1	0
21	DF	(Spain) ESP	Pol Lirola	39	1	30+5	0	3+1	1
22	DF	(Uruguay) URU	Martín Cáceres	30	2	27	1	1+2	1
23	DF	(Italy) ITA	Lorenzo Venuti	18	0	10+6	0	1+1	0
29	DF	(Brazil) BRA	Dalbert	34	0	29+2	0	3	0
32	DF	(Italy) ITA	Christian Dalle Mura	1	0	0+1	0	0	0
93	DF	(Serbia) SRB	Aleksa Terzić	4	0	0+2	0	1+1	0
Midfielders
5	MF	(Croatia) CRO	Milan Badelj	24	1	20+2	1	2	0
8	MF	(Italy) ITA	Gaetano Castrovilli	35	3	31+2	3	2	0
19	MF	(Colombia) COL	Kevin Agudelo	3	0	1+2	0	0	0
24	MF	(Italy) ITA	Marco Benassi	22	3	10+8	1	4	2
78	MF	(Chile) CHI	Erick Pulgar	41	7	32+5	7	4	0
88	MF	(Ghana) GHA	Alfred Duncan	13	1	10+3	1	0	0
Forwards
7	FW	(France) FRA	Franck Ribéry	21	3	19+2	3	0	0
9	FW	(Ivory Coast) CIV	Christian Kouamé	7	1	3+4	1	0	0
11	FW	(Italy) ITA	Riccardo Sottil	21	0	4+14	0	2+1	0
18	FW	(Algeria) ALG	Rachid Ghezzal	21	1	9+10	1	1+1	0
25	FW	(Italy) ITA	Federico Chiesa	37	11	31+3	10	2+1	1
28	FW	(Serbia) SRB	Dušan Vlahović	34	8	13+17	6	3+1	2
63	FW	(Italy) ITA	Patrick Cutrone	21	5	9+10	4	1+1	1
Players transferred out during the season
6	DF	(Italy) ITA	Luca Ranieri	5	0	2+1	0	2	0
9	FW	(Brazil) BRA	Pedro	4	0	0+4	0	0	0
10	FW	(Ghana) GHA	Kevin-Prince Boateng	15	1	6+8	1	1	0
14	MF	(Burkina Faso) BFA	Bryan Dabo	0	0	0	0	0	0
15	MF	(Uruguay) URU	Sebastián Cristóforo	1	0	1	0	0	0
15	DF	(Uruguay) URU	Maximiliano Olivera	1	0	0+1	0	0	0
16	MF	(France) FRA	Valentin Eysseric	3	0	0+3	0	0	0
19	MF	(Spain) ESP	Cristóbal Montiel	1	0	0	0	0+1	0
27	MF	(Poland) POL	Szymon Żurkowski	2	0	0+2	0	0	0
32	DF	(Denmark) DEN	Jacob Rasmussen	0	0	0	0	0	0
77	FW	(France) FRA	Cyril Théréau	0	0	0	0	0	0

Last updated: 2 August 2020
Source: Competitions

=== Goalscorers ===
Rank	No.	Pos	Nat	Name	Serie A	Coppa Italia	Total
1	28	FW	(Serbia)	Dušan Vlahović	6	2	8
2	25	FW	(Italy)	Federico Chiesa	6	1	7
3	78	MF	(Chile)	Erick Pulgar	4	0	4
4	4	DF	(Serbia)	Nikola Milenković	3	0	3
4	7	FW	(France)	Franck Ribéry	3	0	3
4	8	MF	(Italy)	Gaetano Castrovilli	3	0	3
4	20	DF	(Argentina)	Germán Pezzella	3	0	3
4	24	MF	(Italy)	Marco Benassi	1	2	3
9	22	DF	(Uruguay)	Martín Cáceres	1	1	2
10	5	MF	(Croatia)	Milan Badelj	1	0	1
10	10	MF	(Ghana)	Kevin-Prince Boateng	1	0	1
10	21	DF	(Spain)	Pol Lirola	0	1	1
10	63	FW	(Italy)	Patrick Cutrone	0	1	1
Own goal					2	0	2
Totals					34	8	42

Last updated: 27 June 2020

=== Clean sheets ===
Rank	No.	Pos	Nat	Name	Serie A	Coppa Italia	Total
1	69	GK	(Poland)	Bartłomiej Drągowski	6	0	6
2	1	GK	(Italy)	Pietro Terracciano	0	1	1
Totals					6	1	7

Last updated: 8 February 2020

=== Disciplinary record ===
No.	Pos	Nat	Name	Serie A			Coppa Italia			Total		
No.	Pos	Nat	Name	Booked	(yellow card) (yellow-red card)	Sent off (straight red)	Booked	(yellow card) (yellow-red card)	Sent off (straight red)	Booked	(yellow card) (yellow-red card)	Sent off (straight red)
69	GK	(Poland)	Bartłomiej Drągowski	1	0	0	0	0	0	1	0	0
4	DF	(Serbia)	Nikola Milenković	5	0	0	0	0	0	5	0	0
6	DF	(Italy)	Luca Ranieri	0	1	0	1	0	0	1	1	0
17	DF	(Italy)	Federico Ceccherini	1	0	0	0	0	0	1	0	0
20	DF	(Argentina)	Germán Pezzella	9	0	0	0	1	0	9	1	0
21	DF	(Spain)	Pol Lirola	4	0	0	0	0	0	4	0	0
22	DF	(Uruguay)	Martín Cáceres	5	0	0	1	0	0	6	0	0
23	DF	(Italy)	Lorenzo Venuti	3	0	0	0	0	0	3	0	0
29	DF	(Brazil)	Dalbert	6	0	0	1	0	0	7	0	0
93	DF	(Serbia)	Aleksa Terzić	0	0	0	1	0	0	1	0	0
5	MF	(Croatia)	Milan Badelj	1	0	0	0	0	0	1	0	0
8	MF	(Italy)	Gaetano Castrovilli	8	0	0	0	0	0	8	0	0
10	MF	(Ghana)	Kevin-Prince Boateng	2	0	0	0	0	0	2	0	0
24	MF	(Italy)	Marco Benassi	1	0	0	0	0	0	1	0	0
78	MF	(Chile)	Erick Pulgar	7	0	0	0	0	0	7	0	0
7	FW	(France)	Franck Ribéry	1	0	1	0	0	0	1	0	1
11	FW	(Italy)	Riccardo Sottil	2	0	0	1	0	0	3	0	0
18	FW	(Algeria)	Rachid Ghezzal	1	0	0	0	0	0	1	0	0
25	FW	(Italy)	Federico Chiesa	4	0	0	0	0	0	4	0	0
28	FW	(Serbia)	Dušan Vlahović	3	0	0	1	0	0	4	0	0
Totals				64	1	1	7	1	0	71	2	1

Last updated: 8 February 2020
