= 2021–22 ACF Fiorentina season =

Fiorentina
2021–22 season
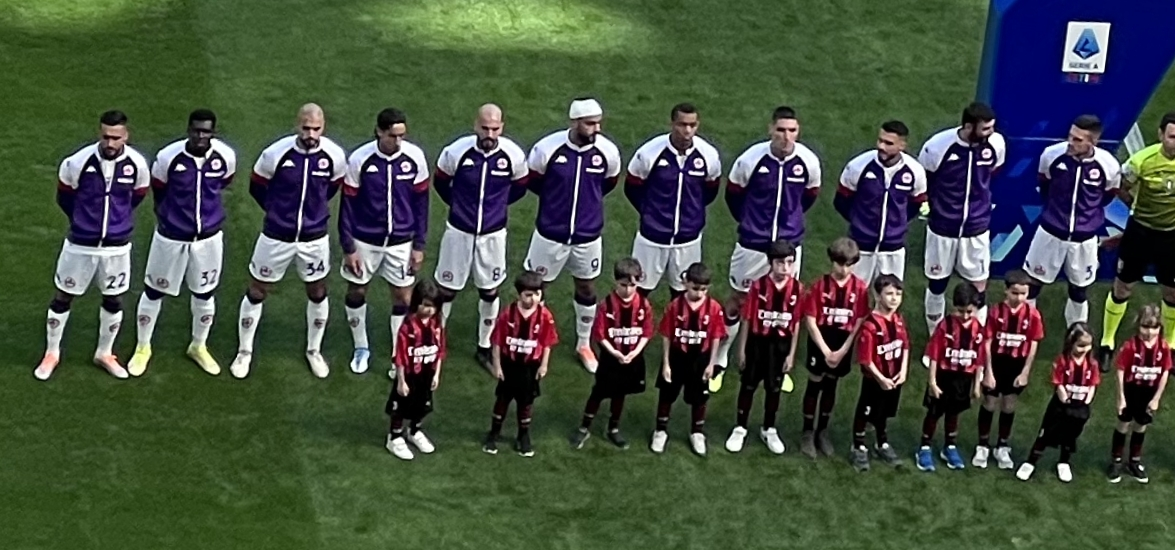
- Owner: Mediacom
- Chairman: Rocco B. Commisso
- Head coach: Vincenzo Italiano
- Stadium: Stadio Artemio Franchi
- Serie A: 7th
- Coppa Italia: Semi-finals
- Top goalscorer: League: Dušan Vlahović (17); All: Dušan Vlahović (20)
Home colours	Away colours	Third colours

The 2021–22 season was the 95th season in the existence of ACF Fiorentina and the club's 18th consecutive season in the top flight of Italian football. In addition to the domestic league, Fiorentina participated in this season's edition of the Coppa Italia.

Following last season's disappointment results, Giuseppe Iachini was let go at the end of the season. Gennaro Gattuso was initially hired to be the team's manager in the early summer, but parted ways 23 days after his appointment following disagreements on transfer policy and agent's influence. Vincenzo Italiano was hired from Spezia as the team's next manager.

== Players ==
=== Squad information ===
As of 4 January 2022
Appearances include league matches only

No.	Player	Nat.	Position(s)	Date of birth (age)	Signed from	Signed in	Contract ends	Apps.	Goals	Notes
Goalkeepers
1	Pietro Terracciano	(Italy)	GK	8 March 1990 (age 36)	(Italy) Empoli	2019	2023	16	0	
25	Antonio Rosati	(Italy)	GK	26 June 1983 (age 43)	(Italy) Torino	2021		3	0	
69	Bartłomiej Drągowski	(Poland)	GK	19 August 1997 (age 29)	(Poland) Jagiellonia Białystok	2016	2023	76	0	
Defenders
2	Lucas Martínez Quarta	(Argentina)	CB	10 May 1996 (age 30)	(Argentina) River Plate	2020	2025	23	1	
3	Cristiano Biraghi	(Italy)	LB	1 September 1992 (age 34)	(Italy) Pescara	2017	2024	109	3	
4	Nikola Milenković	(Serbia)	CB / RB	12 October 1997 (age 29)	(Serbia) Partizan	2017	2023	124	12	
17	Aleksa Terzić	(Serbia)	LB	17 August 1999 (age 27)	(Serbia) Red Star Belgrade	2019	2024	2	0	
23	Lorenzo Venuti	(Italy)	RB	12 April 1995 (age 31)	(Italy) Youth Sector	2019	2024	47	0	
29	Álvaro Odriozola	(Spain)	RB	14 December 1995 (age 30)	(Spain) Real Madrid	2021	2022	2	0	On loan
55	Matija Nastasić	(Serbia)	CB / LB	28 March 1993 (age 33)	(Germany) Schalke 04	2021	2023	26	2	
98	Igor	(Brazil)	CB / LB / LM	7 February 1998 (age 28)	(Italy) SPAL	2021	2024	33	0	
Midfielders
5	Giacomo Bonaventura	(Italy)	CM / AM / LW	22 August 1989 (age 37)	(Italy) Milan	2020	2022	38	4	
8	Riccardo Saponara	(Italy)	AM	21 December 1991 (age 34)	(Italy) Empoli	2018	2022	35	3	
10	Gaetano Castrovilli	(Italy)	CM	17 February 1997 (age 29)	(Italy) Bari	2017	2024	71	8	
14	Youssef Maleh	(Italy)	CM	28 August 1998 (age 28)	(Italy) Venezia	2021	2024	2	0	
18	Lucas Torreira	(Uruguay)	CM	1 February 1996 (age 30)	(England) Arsenal	2021	2022	1	0	On loan
24	Marco Benassi	(Italy)	CM / AM	8 September 1994 (age 32)	(Italy) Torino	2017	2024	87	13	
32	Alfred Duncan	(Ghana)	CM / DM	10 March 1993 (age 33)	(Italy) Sassuolo	2020	2024	20	1	
34	Sofyan Amrabat	(Morocco)	CM / DM	21 August 1996 (age 30)	(Italy) Hellas Verona	2020	2024	33	0	
Forwards
7	José Callejón	(Spain)	RW / LW	11 February 1987 (age 39)	(Italy) Napoli	2020	2022	24	0	
9	Arthur Cabral	(Brazil)	CF	25 April 1998 (age 28)	(Switzerland) Basel	2022	2026	0	0	
19	Krzysztof Piątek	(Poland)	CF	1 July 1995 (age 31)	(Germany) Hertha BSC	2022		0	0	
22	Nicolás González	(Argentina)	LW / RW / CF	6 April 1998 (age 28)	(Germany) VfB Stuttgart	2021	2026	4	1	
33	Riccardo Sottil	(Italy)	LW / RW / CF	3 June 1999 (age 27)	(Italy) Youth Sector	2018	2024	23	0	
91	Aleksandr Kokorin	(Russia)	CF	19 March 1991 (age 35)	(Russia) Spartak Moscow	2021	2024	5	0	
11	Jonathan Ikoné	(France)	CF	2 May 1998 (age 28)	(France) Lille	2022	2026	0	0	
Players that left the club during the season
9	Dušan Vlahović	(Serbia)	CF	28 January 2000 (age 26)	(Serbia) Partizan	2018	2023	81	30	
15	Erick Pulgar	(Chile)	DM / CB / CM	15 January 1994 (age 32)	(Italy) Bologna	2019	2023	71	8	

=== Other players under contract ===
As of 19 July 2021

Note: Flags indicate national team as defined under FIFA eligibility rules; some limited exceptions apply. Players may hold more than one non-FIFA nationality.

No.	Pos.	Nation	Player
—	GK	ITA	Federico Brancolini
—	GK	ITA	Michele Cerofolini
—	DF	ITA	Pierluigi Pinto
—	FW	ITA	Mattia Trovato
—	FW	CZE	Martin Graiciar

=== Out on loan ===
As of 3 February 2022

Note: Flags indicate national team as defined under FIFA eligibility rules; some limited exceptions apply. Players may hold more than one non-FIFA nationality.

No.	Pos.	Nation	Player
—	GK	ITA	Simone Ghidotti (at Gubbio until 30 June 2022)
—	DF	ITA	Christian Dalle Mura (at Cremonese until 30 June 2022)
—	DF	ROU	Eduard Dutu (at Montevarchi until 30 June 2022)
—	DF	ITA	Gabriele Ferrarini (at Reggiana until 30 June 2022)
—	DF	ITA	Mattia Fiorini (at Fiorenzuola until 30 June 2022)
—	DF	ITA	Alessandro Lovisa (at Lucchese until 30 June 2022)
—	DF	ESP	Tòfol Montiel (at Siena until 30 June 2022)
—	DF	DEN	Jacob Rasmussen (at Vitesse until 30 June 2022)
—	DF	ITA	Luca Ranieri (at Salernitana until 30 June 2022)
—	MF	CRO	Toni Fruk (at Gorica until 30 June 2022)
—	MF	ITA	Niccolò Pierozzi (at Pro Patria until 30 June 2022)
—	MF	CHI	Erick Pulgar (at Galatasaray until 30 June 2022)
—	MF	POL	Szymon Żurkowski (at Empoli until 30 June 2022)
—	FW	ITA	Federico Chiesa (at Juventus until 30 June 2022)
—	FW	ITA	Gabriele Gori (at Cosenza until 30 June 2022)
—	FW	FRA	Christian Koffi (at Sète until 30 June 2022)
—	FW	CIV	Christian Kouamé (at Anderlecht until 30 June 2022)
—	FW	ITA	Samuele Spalluto (at Gubbio until 30 June 2022)

== Transfers ==
=== In ===
Date	Pos.	Player	Age	Moving from	Fee	Notes
1 July 2021	RW	(Argentina) Nicolás González	23	(Germany) VfB Stuttgart	€23.5M	
1 July 2021	CB	(Brazil) Igor	23	(Italy) SPAL	€5M	Obligation to buy from 2019 loan deal
21 August 2021	CB	(Serbia) Matija Nastasić	28	(Germany) Schalke 04	€500,000	
2 January 2022	FW	(France) Jonathan Ikoné	23	(France) Lille	€15M	
7 January 2022	FW	(Poland) Krzysztof Piątek	26	(Germany) Hertha BSC	Undisclosed	
29 January 2022	FW	(Brazil) Arthur Cabral	23	(Switzerland) Basel	€17M	

==== Loans in ====
Date	Pos.	Player	Age	Moving from	Fee	Notes
25 August 2021	CM	(Uruguay) Lucas Torreira	25	(England) Arsenal	€1.5M	
28 August 2021	RB	(Spain) Álvaro Odriozola	25	(Spain) Real Madrid		

=== Out ===
Date	Pos.	Player	Age	Moving to	Fee	Notes
1 July 2021	GK	(France) Alban Lafont	22	(France) Nantes	€7.5M	Option to buy from 2019 loan deal
1 July 2021	CB	(Italy) Federico Ceccherini	29	(Italy) Hellas Verona	€3M	Obligation to buy from 2020 loan deal
1 July 2021	CB	(Slovakia) Dávid Hancko	23	(Czech Republic) Sparta Prague	€2.5M	
1 July 2021	CM	(Italy) Marco Marozzi	22	Free agent	Free	
1 July 2021	CM	(Spain) Borja Valero	36	Retired	Free	
1 July 2021	CB	(Uruguay) Martín Cáceres	34	Free agent	Free	
1 July 2021	FW	(Norway) Rafik Zekhnini	23	(Norway) Molde	Free	
5 July 2021	CB	(Netherlands) Kevin Diks	24	(Denmark) Copenhagen	Free	
5 July 2021	CB	(Bulgaria) Petko Hristov	22	(Italy) Spezia	Free	
8 July 2021	CM	(Albania) Erald Lakti	21	(Italy) Lecco	Free	
19 July 2021	CB	(Argentina) Julián Illanes	24	(Italy) Pescara	€350,000	
19 July 2021	CB	(Uruguay) Maximiliano Olivera	29	(Mexico) Juárez	Free	
23 July 2021	CM	(France) Valentin Eysseric	29	(Turkey) Kasımpaşa	Free	
19 August 2021	CB	(Argentina) Germán Pezzella	30	(Spain) Real Betis	€3.5M	
23 August 2021	RB	(Spain) Pol Lirola	24	(France) Marseille	€13M	
24 August 2021	AM	(Italy) Marco Meli	21	(Italy) Siena	Free	
6 September 2021	FW	(France) Franck Ribéry	38	(Italy) Salernitana	Free	
27 January 2022	FW	(Serbia) Dušan Vlahović	22	(Italy) Juventus	€70M	€70M + €10M variables

== Pre-season and friendlies ==
Win Draw Loss Fixtures

20 July 2021 Friendly	Fiorentina (Italy)	7–1	(Germany) SV Ostermünchen	Moena, Italy
17:00 CEST (UTC+2)	Milenković 8'; Bonaventura 13'; Duncan 24'; Ranieri 47'; Saponara 60'; Benassi 65', 82'	Report	Schiedermeier 76' (pen.)	Stadium: Campo Sportivo Cesare Benatti

25 July 2021 Friendly	Fiorentina (Italy)	11–0	(Italy) Foligno	Moena, Italy
17:00 CEST (UTC+2)	Callejón 15'; Duncan 24'; Bonaventura 38' (pen.); Vlahović 48', 52', 58', 63', 74', 77', 80' (pen.); 88' (o.g.)	Report		Stadium: Campo Sportivo Cesare Benatti

29 July 2021 Friendly	Fiorentina (Italy)	9–0	(Italy) Levico	Moena, Italy
17:00 CEST (UTC+2)	Kokorin 12' (pen.); Agostinelli 17', 39'; Bianco 50'; Benassi 55', 70'; Sottil 57', 65'; Gori 73'	Report		Stadium: Campo Sportivo Cesare Benatti
Note: The match was played in two halves 40 minutes each.

30 July 2021 Friendly	Fiorentina (Italy)	4–0	(Italy) Virtus Verona	Moena, Italy
17:00 CEST (UTC+2)	Bonaventura 11'; Saponara 46'; Milenković 62'; Vlahović 76'	Report		Stadium: Campo Sportivo Cesare Benatti

7 August 2021 Unbeatables Cup	Fiorentina (Italy)	0–0 (4–2 p)	(Spain) Espanyol	Florence, Italy
19:00 CEST (UTC+2)		Report		Stadium: Stadio Artemio Franchi; Attendance: 3,000; Referee: Massimiliano Irrati

== Competitions ==
=== Overall record ===
Competition	First match	Last match	Starting round	Final position	Record							
Competition	First match	Last match	Starting round	Final position	Pld	W	D	L	GF	GA	GD	Win %
Serie A	22 August 2021	21 May 2022	Matchday 1	7th	38	19	5	14	59	51	+8	50.00
Coppa Italia	13 August 2021	20 April 2022	First round	Semi-finals	6	4	0	2	14	7	+7	66.67
Total					44	23	5	16	73	58	+15	52.27

Source: Soccerway

=== Serie A ===
==== League table ====
Pos	Team	Pld	W	D	L	GF	GA	GD	Pts	Qualification or relegation
5	Lazio	38	18	10	10	77	58	+19	64	Qualification for the Europa League group stage (Note: Since the winners of the 2021–22 Coppa Italia, Inter Milan, qualified for the Champions League, the Europa League berth awarded to the Coppa Italia winners was passed to the sixth-placed team, and the Europa Conference League berth awarded to the sixth-placed team was passed to the seventh-placed team.)
6	Roma	38	18	9	11	59	43	+16	63	Qualification for the Europa League group stage
7	Fiorentina	38	19	5	14	59	51	+8	62	Qualification for the Conference League play-off round
8	Atalanta	38	16	11	11	65	48	+17	59	
9	Hellas Verona	38	14	11	13	65	59	+6	53	

Source: Serie A
Rules for classification: 1) Points; 2) Head-to-head points; 3) Head-to-head goal difference; 4) Goal difference; 5) Goals scored; 6) Draw. (Note: Head-to-head record is used only after all the matches between the teams in question have been played)

==== Results summary ====
Overall								Home						Away					
Pld	W	D	L	GF	GA	GD	Pts	W	D	L	GF	GA	GD	W	D	L	GF	GA	GD
38	19	5	14	59	51	+8	62	13	2	4	38	20	+18	6	3	10	21	31	−10

Source: Serie A

==== Results by round ====
Round	1	2	3	4	5	6	7	8	9	10	11	12	13	14	15	16	17	18	19	20	21	22	23	24	25	26	27	28	29	30	31	32	33	34	35	36	37	38
Ground	A	H	A	A	H	A	H	A	H	A	H	A	H	A	H	A	H	H	A	H	A	H	A	H	A	H	A	H	H	A	H	A	H	A	A	H	A	H
Result	L	W	W	W	L	W	L	L	W	L	W	L	W	L	W	W	W	D	D	L	L	W	D	L	W	W	L	D	W	D	W	W	W	L	L	W	L	W
Position	18	10	8	5	6	5	5	9	7	8	7	7	7	6	6	6	5	6	7	6	7	6	7	8	8	7	8	8	8	8	8	7	7	7	7	7	7	7

Source: Serie A
A = Away; H = Home; W = Win; D = Draw; L = Loss

==== Matches ====
The league fixtures were announced on 14 July 2021.

22 August 2021 1	Roma	3–1	Fiorentina	Rome
20:45 CEST (UTC+2)	Pellegrini (yellow card) 13'; Mkhitaryan 26'; Zaniolo (yellow card) 44' (yellow-red card) 52'; Veretout 64', 79'	Report	Drągowski (red card) 17'; Bonaventura (yellow card) 45+3'; Pulgar (yellow card) 53'; Milenković 60'	Stadium: Stadio Olimpico; Attendance: 26,997; Referee: Luca Pairetto

28 August 2021 2	Fiorentina	2–1	Torino	Florence
20:45 CEST (UTC+2)	Castrovilli (yellow card) 22'; Milenković (yellow card) 38'; González 41'; Bonaventura (yellow card) 48'; Vlahović (yellow card) 65', (goal) 70'	Report	Djidji (yellow card) 39'; Mandragora (yellow card) 45'; Buongiorno (yellow card) 65'; Aina (yellow card) 80'; Lukić (yellow card) 83'; Verdi 89'	Stadium: Stadio Artemio Franchi; Attendance: 12,592; Referee: Maurizio Mariani

11 September 2021 3	Atalanta	1–2	Fiorentina	Bergamo
20:45 CEST (UTC+2)	Mæhle (yellow card) 31'; Zapata (yellow card) 45+2', (goal) 65' (pen.); Gosens (yellow card) 76'; Freuler (yellow card) 86'; Palomino (yellow card) 90+2'	Report	Vlahović 33' (pen.), 49' (pen.); Bonaventura (yellow card) 45+2'; Igor (yellow card) 56'; Milenković (yellow card) 74'; Odriozola (yellow card) 81'	Stadium: Gewiss Stadium; Attendance: 9,162; Referee: Valerio Marini

18 September 2021 4	Genoa	1–2	Fiorentina	Genoa
15:00 CEST (UTC+2)	Touré (yellow card) 13'; Criscito (yellow card) 15', (goal) 90+8' (pen.); Vanheusden (yellow card) 20'; Behrami (yellow card) 66'	Report	Odriozola (yellow card) 36'; Biraghi (yellow card) 45+3'; Martínez Quarta (yellow card) 54'; Saponara 60'; Kokorin (yellow card) 85'; Bonaventura 89'	Stadium: Stadio Luigi Ferraris; Attendance: 6,269; Referee: Livio Marinelli

21 September 2021 5	Fiorentina	1–3	Internazionale	Florence
20:45 CEST (UTC+2)	Sottil 23'; González (yellow card) 78' (yellow-red card) 78'	Report	Škriniar (yellow card) 18'; Darmian 52', (yellow card) 63'; Džeko 55'; Çalhanoğlu (yellow card) 83'; Perišić 87'	Stadium: Stadio Artemio Franchi; Attendance: 15,927; Referee: Michael Fabbri

26 September 2021 6	Udinese	0–1	Fiorentina	Udine
15:00 CEST (UTC+2)	Arslan (yellow card) 45+2'; Walace (yellow card) 53'	Report	Vlahović 16' (pen.); Martínez Quarta (yellow card) 17'; Amrabat (yellow card) 70'; Odriozola (yellow card) 90+5'	Stadium: Stadio Friuli; Attendance: 7,208; Referee: Davide Ghersini

3 October 2021 7	Fiorentina	1–2	Napoli	Florence
18:00 CEST (UTC+2)	Martínez Quarta 28', (yellow card) 36'; Bonaventura (yellow card) 31'; Pulgar (yellow card) 53'	Report	Insigne (penalty missed) 39'; Lozano 39'; Rrahmani 50'; Zambo Anguissa (yellow card) 54'; Mário Rui (yellow card) 68'; Demme (yellow card) 90+1'	Stadium: Stadio Artemio Franchi; Attendance: 15,264; Referee: Simone Sozza

18 October 2021 8	Venezia	1–0	Fiorentina	Ferrara
20:45 CEST (UTC+2)	Aramu 36'; Ceccaroni (yellow card) 63'; Ampadu (yellow card) 72'	Report	Amrabat (yellow card) 24'; Odriozola (yellow card) 28'; Benassi (yellow card) 61'; Sottil (yellow card) 69' (yellow-red card) 77'	Stadium: Stadio Paolo Mazza; Attendance: 8,043; Referee: Luca Massimi

24 October 2021 9	Fiorentina	3–0	Cagliari	Florence
15:00 CEST (UTC+2)	Biraghi 21' (pen.); González 42'; Vlahović 49'	Report	Keita (yellow card) 20'; Marin (yellow card) 48'	Stadium: Stadio Artemio Franchi; Attendance: 20,290; Referee: Antonio Rapuano

27 October 2021 10	Lazio	1–0	Fiorentina	Rome
20:45 CEST (UTC+2)	Pedro 52'; Cataldi (yellow card) 56'; Luis Alberto (yellow card) 79'	Report	Castrovilli (yellow card) 24'; Biraghi (yellow card) 47'; Duncan (yellow card) 68'	Stadium: Stadio Olimpico; Attendance: 13,000; Referee: Giovanni Ayroldi

31 October 2021 11	Fiorentina	3–0	Spezia	Florence
15:00 CET (UTC+1)	Martínez Quarta (yellow card) 36'; Vlahović 44' (pen.), 62', 74', (yellow card) 75'; Venuti (yellow card) 55'; Maleh (yellow card) 82'	Report	Ferrer (yellow card) 21'; Gyasi (yellow card) 43'; Colley (yellow card) 58'	Stadium: Stadio Artemio Franchi; Attendance: 19,511; Referee: Antonio Giua

6 November 2021 12	Juventus	1–0	Fiorentina	Turin
18:00 CET (UTC+1)	Danilo (yellow card) 45+2'; Rugani (yellow card) 88'; Cuadrado 90+1'	Report	Martínez Quarta (yellow card) 26'; Milenković (yellow card) 66' (yellow-red card) 73'; Nastasić (yellow card) 82'	Stadium: Juventus Stadium; Attendance: 29,501; Referee: Simone Sozza

20 November 2021 13	Fiorentina	4–3	Milan	Florence
20:45 CET (UTC+1)	Duncan 15'; Saponara 45+1'; Vlahović 60', 85'; Castrovilli (yellow card) 90+5'	Report	Ibrahimović 62', 67'; Hernandez (yellow card) 90+5'; Venuti 90+6' (o.g.)	Stadium: Stadio Artemio Franchi; Attendance: 32,567; Referee: Marco Guida

27 November 2021 14	Empoli	2–1	Fiorentina	Empoli
15:00 CET (UTC+1)	Tonelli (yellow card) 65'; Bandinelli 87'; Pinamonti 89'	Report	Torreira (yellow card) 52'; Vlahović 57'	Stadium: Stadio Carlo Castellani; Attendance: 7,878; Referee: Juan Luca Sacchi

30 November 2021 15	Fiorentina	3–1	Sampdoria	Florence
18:30 CET (UTC+1)	Callejón 23'; Vlahović 32'; Sottil 45'	Report	Gabbiadini 15', (yellow card) 42'; Colley (yellow card) 74'; Ferrari (yellow card) 82'	Stadium: Stadio Artemio Franchi; Attendance: 17,913; Referee: Federico Dionisi

5 December 2021 16	Bologna	2–3	Fiorentina	Bologna
12:30 CET (UTC+1)	Domínguez (yellow card) 24'; Barrow 42'; Theate (yellow card) 50'; Hickey 83'; Soumaoro (yellow card) 90+4'	Report	Torreira (yellow card) 25'; Maleh 33'; Biraghi 52'; Milenković (yellow card) 64'; Vlahović 67' (pen.); Amrabat (yellow card) 90'	Stadium: Stadio Renato Dall'Ara; Attendance: 18,175; Referee: Massimiliano Irrati

11 December 2021 17	Fiorentina	4–0	Salernitana	Florence
15:00 CET (UTC+1)	Milenković (yellow card) 11'; Bonaventura 31'; Vlahović 51', 84'; Maleh 90'	Report	Kastanos (yellow card) 20'	Stadium: Stadio Artemio Franchi; Attendance: 18,579; Referee: Davide Ghersini

19 December 2021 18	Fiorentina	2–2	Sassuolo	Florence
12:30 CET (UTC+1)	Biraghi (yellow card) 44' (yellow-red card) 68'; Vlahović 51'; Martínez Quarta (yellow card) 58'; Torreira 61'	Report	Toljan (yellow card) 27'; Scamacca 32', (yellow card) 59'; Frattesi 37', (yellow card) 71'; Chiricheș (yellow card) 54'; Traorè (yellow card) 56'	Stadium: Stadio Artemio Franchi; Attendance: 21,514; Referee: Marco Serra

22 December 2021 19	Hellas Verona	1–1	Fiorentina	Verona
18:30 CET (UTC+1)	Lasagna 17'; Caprari (yellow card) 46'; Ilić (yellow card) 46'	Report	Castrovilli 81'; Terzić (yellow card) 84'	Stadium: Stadio Marcantonio Bentegodi; Attendance: 14,001; Referee: Daniele Doveri

10 January 2022 21	Torino	4–0	Fiorentina	Turin
17:00 CET (UTC+1)	Singo 19'; Brekalo 23', 31'; Djidji (yellow card) 29'; Vojvoda (yellow card) 55'; Sanabria 58'	Report	Martínez Quarta (yellow card) 13'; Igor (yellow card) 62'	Stadium: Stadio Olimpico Grande Torino; Attendance: 3,545; Referee: Livio Marinelli

17 January 2022 22	Fiorentina	6–0	Genoa	Florence
20:45 CET (UTC+1)	Vlahović (penalty missed) 11', 51'; Odriozola 15'; Bonaventura 34'; Biraghi 42', 69'; Torreira (yellow card) 74', (goal) 77'	Report	Calafiori (yellow card) 32'; Portanova (yellow card) 36'; Sturaro (yellow card) 41'	Stadium: Stadio Artemio Franchi; Attendance: 5,000; Referee: Fabio Maresca

23 January 2022 23	Cagliari	1–1	Fiorentina	Cagliari
12:30 CET (UTC+1)	Altare (yellow card) 10'; João Pedro 47', (penalty missed) 68', (yellow card) 81'; Ceppitelli (yellow card) 86'	Report	Biraghi (penalty missed) 8', (yellow card) 29'; Odriozola (red card) 65'; Sottil 75', (yellow card) 75'; Maleh (yellow card) 89'	Stadium: Unipol Domus; Attendance: 5,000; Referee: Gianluca Aureliano

5 February 2022 24	Fiorentina	0–3	Lazio	Florence
20:45 CET (UTC+1)	Bonaventura (yellow card) 50'; Torreira (yellow card) 55' (yellow-red card) 85'	Report	Lucas (yellow card) 30'; Pedro (yellow card) 45+1'; Milinković-Savić 52'; Lazzari (yellow card) 67'; Immobile 70'; Biraghi 81' (o.g.); Patric (yellow card) 83'; Strakosha (yellow card) 85'	Stadium: Stadio Artemio Franchi; Attendance: 17,181; Referee: Daniele Orsato

14 February 2022 25	Spezia	1–2	Fiorentina	La Spezia
20:45 CET (UTC+1)	Agudelo 74'; Reca (yellow card) 78'; Amian (yellow card) 84'	Report	Piątek (penalty missed) 16', 42'; Castrovilli (yellow card) 67'; Amrabat 89'	Stadium: Stadio Alberto Picco; Attendance: 5,400; Referee: Matteo Marchetti

20 February 2022 26	Fiorentina	1–0	Atalanta	Florence
12:30 CET (UTC+1)	Milenković (yellow card) 15'; Piątek 56'; Amrabat (yellow card) 73'	Report	Djimsiti (yellow card) 13'; Malinovskyi (yellow card) 45+1'; Demiral (yellow card) 45+2'; Tolói (yellow card) 74'; Sportiello (yellow card) 90+6'	Stadium: Stadio Artemio Franchi; Attendance: 18,056; Referee: Daniele Doveri

26 February 2022 27	Sassuolo	2–1	Fiorentina	Reggio Emilia
20:50 CET (UTC+1)	Traorè 19'; Lopez (yellow card) 70'; Defrel 90+4'	Report	Bonaventura (yellow card) 79' (yellow-red card) 80'; Cabral 88'	Stadium: Mapei Stadium – Città del Tricolore; Attendance: 8,952; Referee: Alessandro Prontera

6 March 2022 28	Fiorentina	1–1	Hellas Verona	Florence
15:00 CET (UTC+1)	Piątek 10'	Report	Caprari 20' (pen.); Günter (yellow card) 37'; Simeone (yellow card) 56'; Ceccherini (yellow card) 72'; Bessa (yellow card) 82'	Stadium: Stadio Artemio Franchi; Attendance: 23,491; Referee: Gianluca Manganiello

13 March 2022 29	Fiorentina	1–0	Bologna	Florence
12:30 CET (UTC+1)	Torreira 70', (yellow card) 76'	Report	Bonifazi (yellow card) 23' (yellow-red card) 41'; Soumaoro (yellow card) 73'; Hickey (yellow card) 86'; Sansone (yellow card) 90+3'	Stadium: Stadio Artemio Franchi; Attendance: 22,635; Referee: Juan Luca Sacchi

19 March 2022 30	Internazionale	1–1	Fiorentina	Milan
18:00 CET (UTC+1)	Dumfries 55'; D'Ambrosio (yellow card) 72'	Report	Milenković (yellow card) 39'; Torreira 50'; Saponara (yellow card) 56'	Stadium: San Siro; Attendance: 54,988; Referee: Daniele Chiffi

3 April 2022 31	Fiorentina	1–0	Empoli	Florence
12:30 CEST (UTC+2)	Torreira (yellow card) 56'; González 58'	Report	Luperto (yellow card) 45+3' (yellow-red card) 57'; Ismajli (yellow card) 81'	Stadium: Stadio Artemio Franchi; Attendance: 22,407; Referee: Luca Massimi

10 April 2022 32	Napoli	2–3	Fiorentina	Naples
15:00 CEST (UTC+2)	Mertens 58'; Osimhen 84'	Report	Milenković (yellow card) 11'; González 29'; Ikoné 66', (yellow card) 88'; Cabral 72', (yellow card) 73'	Stadium: Stadio Diego Armando Maradona; Attendance: 50,000; Referee: Maurizio Mariani

16 April 2022 33	Fiorentina	1–0	Venezia	Florence
16:30 CEST (UTC+2)	Torreira 30', (yellow card) 90+3'; Sottil (yellow card) 79'; Duncan (yellow card) 83'; Venuti (yellow card) 90+5'	Report	Haps (yellow card) 29'; Okereke (yellow card) 36'; Kiyine (yellow card) 57'; Peretz (yellow card) 90'	Stadium: Stadio Artemio Franchi; Attendance: 31,627; Referee: Rosario Abisso

24 April 2022 34	Salernitana	2–1	Fiorentina	Salerno
12:30 CEST (UTC+2)	Đurić 9'; Gyömbér (yellow card) 22'; Bonazzoli 79'	Report	Saponara 64'; Milenković (yellow card) 83'	Stadium: Stadio Arechi; Attendance: 20,920; Referee: Davide Massa

27 April 2022 20	Fiorentina	0–4	Udinese	Florence
18:00 CEST (UTC+2)	González (yellow card) 49'; Torreira (yellow card) 59'; Maleh (yellow card) 90+4'	Report	Marí 12'; Nuytinck (yellow card) 16'; Deulofeu 36', (yellow card) 49'; Makengo (yellow card) 55'; Udogie (yellow card) 80', (goal) 90+5'; Walace 90+1'	Stadium: Stadio Artemio Franchi; Attendance: 22,067; Referee: Ivano Pezzuto
Note: The match was originally scheduled for 6 January 2022, but was postponed to 27 April 2022 due to COVID-19 outbreaks within the squads.

1 May 2022 35	Milan	1–0	Fiorentina	Milan
15:00 CEST (UTC+2)	Leão 82'; Bennacer (yellow card) 88'	Report	Maleh (yellow card) 2'; Venuti (yellow card) 42'; Martínez Quarta (yellow card) 72'	Stadium: San Siro; Attendance: 71,542; Referee: Paolo Valeri

9 May 2022 36	Fiorentina	2–0	Roma	Florence
20:45 CEST (UTC+2)	González 5' (pen.); Bonaventura 11', (yellow card) 28'; Amrabat (yellow card) 19'; Duncan (yellow card) 49'	Report	Mancini (yellow card) 24'	Stadium: Stadio Artemio Franchi; Attendance: 29,580; Referee: Marco Guida

16 May 2022 37	Sampdoria	4–1	Fiorentina	Genoa
18:30 CEST (UTC+2)	Ferrari 16'; Vieira (yellow card) 18'; Quagliarella 30'; Thorsby 71'; Sabiri 84'; Trimboli (yellow card) 89'; Colley (yellow card) 90+4', (red card) 90+4'	Report	Torreira (yellow card) 14'; González (yellow card) 15', (goal) 89' (pen.); Maleh (yellow card) 69'	Stadium: Stadio Luigi Ferraris; Attendance: 21,331; Referee: Maurizio Mariani

21 May 2022 38	Fiorentina	2–0	Juventus	Florence
20:45 CEST (UTC+2)	Igor (yellow card) 45'; Duncan 45+1'; Venuti (yellow card) 56'; Amrabat (yellow card) 70'; González 90+2' (pen.)	Report	Kean (yellow card) 44'; Rabiot (yellow card) 56'; De Ligt (yellow card) 84'	Stadium: Stadio Artemio Franchi; Attendance: 34,831; Referee: Daniele Chiffi

=== Coppa Italia ===
13 August 2021 First round	Fiorentina	4–0	Cosenza	Florence
21:00 CEST (UTC+2)	Vlahović 4', 45+4'; González 37'; Venuti 51'; Pezzella (yellow card) 54'	Report	Prestianni (yellow card) 45+1'; Sueva (yellow card) 56'	Stadium: Stadio Artemio Franchi; Attendance: 3,600; Referee: Giacomo Camplone

15 December 2021 Second round	Fiorentina	2–1	Benevento	Florence
21:00 CET (UTC+1)	Milenković 19'; Sottil 47'; Bianco (yellow card) 90+4'	Report	Moncini 51'; Calò (yellow card) 73'	Stadium: Stadio Artemio Franchi; Attendance: 13,800; Referee: Luca Zufferli

13 January 2022 Round of 16	Napoli	2–5 (a.e.t.)	Fiorentina	Naples
18:00 CET (UTC+1)	Mertens 44'; Rrahmani (yellow card) 56'; Fabián (yellow card) 77' (yellow-red card) 90+3'; Lozano (red card) 84'; Tuanzebe (yellow card) 85'; Petagna 90+5'	Report	Duncan (yellow card) 23'; Vlahović 41'; Drągowski (red card) 45+2'; Biraghi 57'; Castrovilli (yellow card) 59'; Venuti 105+1'; Piątek 108'; Maleh 119'	Stadium: Stadio Diego Armando Maradona; Attendance: 4,500; Referee: Giovanni Ayroldi

10 February 2022 Quarter-finals	Atalanta	2–3	Fiorentina	Bergamo
18:00 CET (UTC+1)	De Roon (yellow card) 7'; Zappacosta 30'; Pašalić (yellow card) 32'; Boga 56'	Report	Piątek 9' (pen.), 71', (penalty missed) 71'; Igor (yellow card) 38'; Martínez Quarta (yellow card) 45+1' (yellow-red card) 79'; Milenković 90+3'	Stadium: Gewiss Stadium; Attendance: 7,425; Referee: Michael Fabbri

2 March 2022 Semi-finals; First leg	Fiorentina	0–1	Juventus	Florence
21:00 CET (UTC+1)	Bonaventura (yellow card) 71'; Milenković (yellow card) 72'; Torreira (yellow card) 90'	Report	Pellegrini (yellow card) 57'; De Sciglio (yellow card) 79'; Venuti 90+2' (o.g.)	Stadium: Stadio Artemio Franchi; Attendance: 28,039; Referee: Marco Guida

20 April 2022 Semi-finals; Second leg	Juventus	2–0 (3–0 agg.)	Fiorentina	Turin
21:00 CEST (UTC+2)	Bernardeschi 32'; De Sciglio (yellow card) 45+2'; Danilo 90+4'	Report	Martínez Quarta (yellow card) 72'	Stadium: Juventus Stadium; Attendance: 32,109; Referee: Daniele Doveri

== Statistics ==
=== Appearances and goals ===
No.	Pos	Nat	Player	Total		Serie A		Coppa Italia	
No.	Pos	Nat	Player	Apps	Goals	Apps	Goals	Apps	Goals
Goalkeepers
1	GK	(Italy) ITA	Pietro Terracciano	36	0	31+1	0	3+1	0
25	GK	(Italy) ITA	Antonio Rosati	1	0	0	0	1	0
69	GK	(Poland) POL	Bartłomiej Drągowski	9	0	7	0	2	0
Defenders
2	DF	(Argentina) ARG	Lucas Martínez Quarta	22	1	16+4	1	2	0
3	DF	(Italy) ITA	Cristiano Biraghi	42	5	37	4	5	1
4	DF	(Serbia) SRB	Nikola Milenković	39	3	34	1	4+1	2
17	DF	(Serbia) SRB	Aleksa Terzić	15	0	1+13	0	1	0
23	DF	(Italy) ITA	Lorenzo Venuti	27	2	20+3	0	4	2
29	DF	(Spain) ESP	Álvaro Odriozola	27	1	18+7	1	2	0
55	DF	(Serbia) SRB	Matija Nastasić	6	0	2+3	0	1	0
98	DF	(Brazil) BRA	Igor	35	0	23+7	0	4+1	0
Midfielders
5	MF	(Italy) ITA	Giacomo Bonaventura	35	4	28+3	4	2+2	0
8	MF	(Italy) ITA	Riccardo Saponara	34	3	13+16	3	4+1	0
10	MF	(Italy) ITA	Gaetano Castrovilli	27	1	16+7	1	3+1	0
14	MF	(Morocco) MAR	Youssef Maleh	33	3	11+17	2	3+2	1
18	MF	(Uruguay) URU	Lucas Torreira	35	5	26+5	5	4	0
32	MF	(Ghana) GHA	Alfred Duncan	37	2	21+12	2	2+2	0
34	MF	(Morocco) MAR	Sofyan Amrabat	25	1	8+15	1	1+1	0
42	MF	(Italy) ITA	Alessandro Bianco	2	0	0	0	0+2	0
Forwards
7	FW	(Spain) ESP	José Callejón	33	1	16+14	1	2+1	0
9	FW	(Brazil) BRA	Arthur Cabral	16	2	8+6	2	1+1	0
11	FW	(France) FRA	Jonathan Ikoné	21	1	7+10	1	2+2	0
19	FW	(Poland) POL	Krzysztof Piątek	18	6	9+5	3	2+2	3
22	FW	(Argentina) ARG	Nicolás González	39	8	26+7	7	4+2	1
28	FW	(Italy) ITA	Filippo Distefano	1	0	0+1	0	0	0
33	FW	(Italy) ITA	Riccardo Sottil	29	4	14+10	3	1+4	1
91	FW	(Russia) RUS	Aleksandr Kokorin	7	0	0+6	0	1	0
Players transferred out during the season
9	FW	(Serbia) SRB	Dušan Vlahović	24	20	21	17	2+1	3
15	MF	(Chile) CHI	Erick Pulgar	8	0	4+2	0	1+1	0
24	MF	(Italy) ITA	Marco Benassi	8	0	1+5	0	1+1	0
20	DF	(Argentina) ARG	Germán Pezzella	1	0	0	0	1	0

Source: Competitions
