= 2020–21 ACF Fiorentina season =

Fiorentina
2020–21 season
- Owner: Mediacom
- Chairman: Rocco B. Commisso
- Head coach: Giuseppe Iachini (until 9 November); Cesare Prandelli (from 9 November to 23 March 2021); Giuseppe Iachini (from 24 March)
- Stadium: Stadio Artemio Franchi
- Serie A: 13th
- Coppa Italia: Round of 16
- Top goalscorer: League: Dušan Vlahović (21); All: Dušan Vlahović (21)
Home colours	Away colours	Third colours

The 2020–21 ACF Fiorentina season was the club's 94th season in existence and the club's 17th consecutive season in the top flight of Italian football. In addition to the domestic league, Fiorentina participated in this season's edition of the Coppa Italia. The season covered the period from 3 August 2020 to 30 June 2021.

== Players ==
=== Squad information ===
As of 19 September 2020
Appearances include league matches only

No.	Name	Nat.	Position(s)	Date of birth (age)	Signed from	Signed in	Contract ends	Apps.	Goals	Notes
Goalkeepers
1	Pietro Terracciano	(Italy)	GK	8 March 1990 (age 36)	(Italy) Empoli	2019	2021	9	0	
33	Federico Brancolini	(Italy)	GK	14 July 2001 (age 25)	(Italy) Youth Sector	2017	2022	1	0	
69	Bartłomiej Drągowski	(Poland)	GK	19 August 1997 (age 29)	(Poland) Jagiellonia Białystok	2016	2023	39	0	
Defenders
3	Cristiano Biraghi	(Italy)	LB	1 September 1992 (age 34)	(Italy) Pescara	2017	2022	71	2	
4	Nikola Milenković	(Serbia)	CB / RB	12 October 1997 (age 29)	(Serbia) Partizan	2017	2022	88	8	
17	Federico Ceccherini	(Italy)	CB	11 May 1992 (age 34)	(Italy) Crotone	2018	2023	31	0	
20	Germán Pezzella	(Argentina)	CB	27 June 1991 (age 35)	(Spain) Real Betis	2017	2022	99	6	
21	Pol Lirola	(Spain)	RB	13 August 1997 (age 29)	(Italy) Sassuolo	2019	2024	36	0	
22	Martín Cáceres	(Uruguay)	CB	7 April 1987 (age 39)	(Italy) Lazio	2019	2021	28	1	
23	Lorenzo Venuti	(Italy)	RB	12 April 1995 (age 31)	(Italy) Youth Sector	2019	2024	17	0	
98	Igor	(Brazil)	CB / LB / LM	7 February 1998 (age 28)	(Italy) SPAL	2020	2021	2	0	Loan
Midfielders
5	Giacomo Bonaventura	(Italy)	CM / AM / LW	22 August 1989 (age 37)	(Italy) Milan	2020	2022	1	0	
6	Borja Valero	(Spain)	DM / CM / AM	12 January 1985 (age 41)	(Italy) Inter Milan	2020	2021	167	14	
8	Alfred Duncan	(Ghana)	CM / DM	10 March 1993 (age 33)	(Italy) Sassuolo	2020	2024	14	1	
10	Gaetano Castrovilli	(Italy)	CM	17 February 1997 (age 29)	(Italy) Bari	2017	2024	34	4	
18	Riccardo Saponara	(Italy)	AM	21 December 1991 (age 34)	(Italy) Empoli	2018	2022	30	3	
19	Sebastián Cristóforo	(Uruguay)	CM	23 August 1993 (age 33)	(Spain) Sevilla	2017	2021	27	0	
28	Tòfol Montiel	(Spain)	AM / LW	11 April 2000 (age 26)	(Italy) Youth Sector	2019	2023	1	0	
34	Sofyan Amrabat	(Morocco)	CM / DM	21 August 1996 (age 30)	(Italy) Verona	2020	2024	0	0	
78	Erick Pulgar	(Chile)	DM / CB / CM	15 January 1994 (age 32)	(Italy) Bologna	2019	2023	37	7	
92	Valentin Eysseric	(France)	AM	25 March 1992 (age 34)	(France) Nice	2017	2022	32	1	
Forwards
7	Franck Ribéry	(France)	LW / LM / AM	7 April 1983 (age 43)	(Germany) Bayern Munich	2019	2021	22	3	
9	Dušan Vlahović	(Serbia)	CF	28 January 2000 (age 26)	(Serbia) Partizan	2018	2023	41	6	
11	Christian Kouamé	(Ivory Coast)	CF / LW / RW	6 December 1997 (age 28)	(Italy) Genoa	2020	2024	8	1	
77	José Callejón	(Spain)	RW	11 February 1987 (age 39)	(Italy) Napoli	2020	2022	0	0	
91	Aleksandr Kokorin	(Russia)	CF	19 March 1991 (age 35)	(Russia) Spartak Moscow	2021	2024	0	0	

== Transfers ==
=== In ===
No.	Pos	Player	Transferred from	Fee	Date	Source
8	MF	(Ghana) Alfred Duncan	(Italy) Sassuolo	€15M	1 September 2020	
11	FW	(Ivory Coast) Christian Kouamé	(Italy) Genoa	€10M	1 September 2020	
21	DF	(Spain) Pol Lirola	(Italy) Sassuolo	€12M	1 September 2020	
5	MF	(Italy) Giacomo Bonaventura	(Italy) Milan	Free	10 September 2020	
6	MF	(Spain) Borja Valero	(Italy) Internazionale	Free	16 September 2020	
77	FW	(Spain) José Callejón	(Italy) Napoli	Free	5 October 2020	
91	FW	(Russia) Aleksandr Kokorin	(Russia) Spartak Moscow	€5M	27 February 2021	

=== Out ===
No.	Pos	Player	Transferred to	Fee	Date	Source
	FW	(France) Cyril Théréau	Released	Free	1 July 2020	
18	MF	(Ghana) Amidu Salifu	(Romania) Petrolul	Free	22 August 2020	
21	MF	(France) Jordan Veretout	(Italy) Roma	€17M	1 September 2020	
9	FW	(Argentina) Giovanni Simeone	(Italy) Cagliari	€16M	1 September 2020	
	MF	(Burkina Faso) Bryan Dabo	(Italy) Benevento		15 September 2020	
10	MF	(Ghana) Kevin-Prince Boateng	(Italy) Monza	Undisclosed	28 September 2020	

=== Loans out ===
No.	Pos	Player	Transferred to	Fee	Date	Source
	DF	(Denmark) Jacob Rasmussen	(Netherlands) Vitesse		21 July 2020	
	DF	(Netherlands) Kevin Diks	(Denmark) AGF	Free	31 August 2020	
	GK	(Italy) Michele Cerofolini	(Italy) Reggiana		1 September 2020	
	DF	(Italy) Gabriele Ferrarini	(Italy) Venezia		1 September 2020	
	FW	(Italy) Gabriele Gori	(Italy) Vicenza		1 September 2020	
93	DF	(Serbia) Aleksa Terzić	(Italy) Empoli		1 September 2020	
	MF	(Italy) Marco Marozzi	(Italy) Ravenna		6 September 2020	
	MF	(Italy) Marco Meli	(Italy) Ravenna		6 September 2020	
	MF	(Italy) Mattia Trovato	(Italy) AlbinoLeffe		6 September 2020	
33	FW	(Italy) Riccardo Sottil	(Italy) Cagliari		10 September 2020	
17	FW	(Norway) Rafik Zekhnini	(Switzerland) Lausanne		11 September 2020	
24	MF	(Italy) Marco Benassi	(Italy) Hellas Verona		12 September 2020	
	MF	(Albania) Erald Lakti	(Italy) Renate		22 September 2020	
	GK	(Italy) Simone Ghidotti	(Italy) Pergolettese		22 September 2020	
	DF	(Argentina) Julián Illanes	(Italy) Hellas Verona		23 September 2020	
	DF	(Italy) Luca Ranieri	(Italy) SPAL		25 September 2020	
25	FW	(Italy) Federico Chiesa	(Italy) Juventus	€10M	5 October 2020	

== Pre-season and friendlies ==
Win Draw Loss

6 September 2020 Friendly	Fiorentina (Italy)	5–0	(Italy) Lucchese	Florence, Italy
19:30 CEST (UTC+2)	Ribéry 39', 55'; Kouamé 49', 78'; Solcia 66' (o.g.)	Report		Stadium: Stadio Artemio Franchi; Attendance: 0 Referee: Emanuele Frascaro

12 September 2020 Friendly	Fiorentina (Italy)	5–1	(Italy) Reggiana	Florence, Italy
18:00 CEST (UTC+2)	Ribéry 8', 13'; Chiesa 11'; Kouamé 24', 52'	Report	Zamparo 87'	Stadium: Stadio Artemio Franchi; Attendance: 0

== Competitions ==
=== Overview ===
Competition	First match	Last match	Starting round	Final position	Record							
Competition	First match	Last match	Starting round	Final position	Pld	W	D	L	GF	GA	GD	Win %
Serie A	19 September 2020	22 May 2021	Matchday 1	13th	38	9	13	16	47	59	−12	23.68
Coppa Italia	28 October 2020	13 January 2021	Third round	Round of 16	3	2	0	1	4	3	+1	66.67
Total					41	11	13	17	51	62	−11	26.83

Last updated: 22 May 2021
Source: Soccerway

=== Serie A ===
==== League table ====
Pos	Team	Pld	W	D	L	GF	GA	GD	Pts
11	Genoa	38	10	12	16	47	58	−11	42
12	Bologna	38	10	11	17	51	65	−14	41
13	Fiorentina	38	9	13	16	47	59	−12	40
14	Udinese	38	10	10	18	42	58	−16	40
15	Spezia	38	9	12	17	52	72	−20	39

Source: Serie A, Soccerway
Rules for classification: 1) Points; 2) Head-to-head points; 3) Head-to-head goal difference; 4) Goal difference; 5) Goals scored; 6) Draw. (Note: Head-to-head record is used only after all the matches between the teams in question have been played)

==== Results summary ====
Overall								Home						Away					
Pld	W	D	L	GF	GA	GD	Pts	W	D	L	GF	GA	GD	W	D	L	GF	GA	GD
38	9	13	16	47	59	−12	40	6	6	7	25	25	0	3	7	9	22	34	−12

Last updated: 22 May 2021.
Source: Serie A

==== Results by round ====
Round	1	2	3	4	5	6	7	8	9	10	11	12	13	14	15	16	17	18	19	20	21	22	23	24	25	26	27	28	29	30	31	32	33	34	35	36	37	38
Ground	H	A	H	A	H	A	A	H	A	H	A	H	H	A	H	A	H	A	H	A	H	A	H	A	H	H	A	H	A	H	A	A	H	A	H	A	H	A
Result	W	L	L	D	W	L	D	L	L	D	L	D	D	W	D	L	W	L	W	D	L	L	W	L	L	D	W	L	D	L	L	W	D	D	W	D	L	D
Position	6	9	13	12	10	11	12	15	17	17	17	17	16	14	14	14	12	14	12	11	15	16	14	15	14	14	13	14	14	15	16	13	14	14	13	13	13	13

Updated to match(es) played on 22 May 2021. Source: Serie A
A = Away; H = Home; W = Win; D = Draw; L = Loss

==== Matches ====
The league fixtures were announced on 2 September 2020.

19 September 2020 1	Fiorentina	1–0	Torino	Florence
18:00 CEST (UTC+2)	Milenković (yellow card) 15'; Cáceres (yellow card) 44'; Biraghi (yellow card) 58'; Castrovilli 78'	Report	Linetty (yellow card) 60'	Stadium: Stadio Artemio Franchi; Referee: Rosario Abisso

26 September 2020 2	Internazionale	4–3	Fiorentina	Milan
20:45 CEST (UTC+2)	Barella (yellow card) 7'; Martínez 45+2'; Ceccherini 52' (o.g.); Lukaku 88'; D'Ambrosio 89'	Report	Kouamé 3'; Ceccherini (yellow card) 32'; Castrovilli 57'; Chiesa 63'	Stadium: San Siro; Referee: Gianpaolo Calvarese

2 October 2020 3	Fiorentina	1–2	Sampdoria	Florence
20:45 CEST (UTC+2)	Vlahović 72'	Report	Thorsby (yellow card) 25'; Quagliarella 42' (pen.); Tonelli (yellow card) 70'; Ekdal (yellow card) 73'; Verre 83'	Stadium: Stadio Artemio Franchi; Referee: Piero Giacomelli

18 October 2020 4	Spezia	2–2	Fiorentina	Cesena
15:00 CEST (UTC+2)	Verde 39'; Deiola (yellow card) 45+1'; Chabot (yellow card) 59'; Farias 75'	Report	Pezzella 2'; Biraghi 4'; Bonaventura (yellow card) 66'; Lirola (yellow card) 86'	Stadium: Stadio Dino Manuzzi; Referee: Gianluca Manganiello

25 October 2020 5	Fiorentina	3–2	Udinese	Florence
18:00 CET (UTC+1)	Castrovilli 11', 51', (yellow card) 63'; Milenković 21'	Report	Arslan (yellow card) 41'; Okaka 43', 86'; Pussetto (yellow card) 66'; Becão (yellow card) 85'	Stadium: Stadio Artemio Franchi; Referee: Francesco Fourneau

1 November 2020 6	Roma	2–0	Fiorentina	Rome
18:00 CET (UTC+1)	Spinazzola 12'; Džeko (yellow card) 24'; Veretout (yellow card) 33'; Pedro 70'; Cristante (yellow card) 90+1'	Report	Castrovilli (yellow card) 32'; Lirola (yellow card) 51'; Martínez (red card) 89'	Stadium: Stadio Olimpico; Attendance: 0 Referee: Daniele Orsato

7 November 2020 7	Parma	0–0	Fiorentina	Parma
20:45 CET (UTC+1)	Pezzella (yellow card) 68'	Report	Ribéry (yellow card) 42'; Milenković (yellow card) 73'	Stadium: Stadio Ennio Tardini; Attendance: 0 Referee: Federico La Penna

22 November 2020 8	Fiorentina	0–1	Benevento	Florence
12:30 CET (UTC+1)	Biraghi (yellow card) 87'; Lirola (yellow card) 90+1'	Report	Glik (yellow card) 18'; Improta 52'; Letizia (yellow card) 53'; Hetemaj (yellow card) 74'	Stadium: Stadio Artemio Franchi; Attendance: 0 Referee: Davide Ghersini

29 November 2020 9	Milan	2–0	Fiorentina	Milan
15:00 CET (UTC+1)	Romagnoli 17'; Kessié 28' (pen.), (penalty missed) 40', (yellow card) 71'; Rebić (yellow card) 45+2'	Report	Pezzella (yellow card) 25'; Castrovilli (yellow card) 52'; Biraghi (yellow card) 87'; Amrabat (yellow card) 90+1'	Stadium: San Siro; Attendance: 0 Referee: Rosario Abisso

7 December 2020 10	Fiorentina	1–1	Genoa	Florence
20:45 CET (UTC+1)	Pulgar (yellow card) 15'; Valero (yellow card) 90+4'; Milenković 90+8'	Report	Sturaro (yellow card) 45+2'; Pellegrini (yellow card) 73'; Pjaca 89'	Stadium: Stadio Artemio Franchi; Attendance: 0 Referee: Daniele Doveri

13 December 2020 11	Atalanta	3–0	Fiorentina	Bergamo
15:00 CET (UTC+1)	Gosens 44'; Malinovskyi 55'; Toloi 63'; Romero (yellow card) 67'	Report	Amrabat (yellow card) 54'; Ribéry (yellow card) 80'	Stadium: Gewiss Stadium; Attendance: 0 Referee: Maurizio Mariani

16 December 2020 12	Fiorentina	1–1	Sassuolo	Florence
20:45 CET (UTC+1)	Amrabat (yellow card) 7'; Vlahović 35' (pen.); Castrovilli (yellow card) 42'; Biraghi (yellow card) 45+1'; Milenković (yellow card) 90+2'	Report	Traorè 13', (yellow card) 29'; Locatelli (yellow card) 18'; Berardi (yellow card) 19'; Toljan (yellow card) 62'	Stadium: Stadio Artemio Franchi; Attendance: 0 Referee: Paolo Valeri

19 December 2020 13	Fiorentina	1–1	Hellas Verona	Florence
15:00 CET (UTC+1)	Bonaventura (yellow card) 14'; Vlahović 19' (pen.); Igor (yellow card) 69'	Report	Veloso 8' (pen.); Dimarco (yellow card) 27'; Ceccherini (yellow card) 34'	Stadium: Stadio Artemio Franchi; Attendance: 0 Referee: Francesco Fourneau

22 December 2020 14	Juventus	0–3	Fiorentina	Turin
20:45 CET (UTC+1)	Cuadrado (red card) 18'; Danilo (yellow card) 85'	Report	Vlahović 3'; Biraghi (yellow card) 22'; Ribéry (yellow card) 37'; Valero (yellow card) 47'; Alex Sandro 76' (o.g.); Cáceres 81'; Venuti (yellow card) 84'	Stadium: Allianz Stadium; Attendance: 0 Referee: Federico La Penna

3 January 2021 15	Fiorentina	0–0	Bologna	Florence
15:00 CET (UTC+1)	Igor (yellow card) 69'; Pezzella (yellow card) 71'; Bonaventura (yellow card) 90+2'; Kouamé (yellow card) 90+4'	Report	De Silvestri (yellow card) 4'; Schouten (yellow card) 28'; Domínguez (yellow card) 58'	Stadium: Stadio Artemio Franchi; Attendance: 0 Referee: Daniele Orsato

6 January 2021 16	Lazio	2–1	Fiorentina	Rome
15:00 CET (UTC+1)	Caicedo 6'; Luiz Felipe (yellow card) 43'; Escalante (yellow card) 45'; Immobile 75'; Hoedt (yellow card) 88'	Report	Castrovilli (yellow card) 82'; Vlahović 88' (pen.)	Stadium: Stadio Olimpico; Attendance: 0 Referee: Rosario Abisso

10 January 2021 17	Fiorentina	1–0	Cagliari	Florence
18:00 CET (UTC+1)	Vlahović 72'; Biraghi (yellow card) 77'	Report	João Pedro (penalty missed) 37'; Oliva (yellow card) 53'; Tramoni (yellow card) 86'; Pavoletti (yellow card) 90+1'	Stadium: Stadio Artemio Franchi; Attendance: 0 Referee: Piero Giacomelli

17 January 2021 18	Napoli	6–0	Fiorentina	Naples
12:30 CET (UTC+1)	Insigne 5', 72' (pen.), (yellow card) 51'; Demme 36'; Lozano 38'; Zieliński 45'; Politano 89'	Report		Stadium: Stadio San Paolo; Attendance: 0 Referee: Daniele Chiffi

23 January 2021 19	Fiorentina	2–1	Crotone	Florence
20:45 CET (UTC+1)	Igor (yellow card) 4'; Bonaventura 20'; Vlahović 32'; Ribéry (yellow card) 41'	Report	Zanellato (yellow card) 30'; Simy 66'; Pereira (yellow card) 83'	Stadium: Stadio Artemio Franchi; Attendance: 0 Referee: Marco Piccinini

29 January 2021 20	Torino	1–1	Fiorentina	Turin
20:45 CET (UTC+1)	Lyanco (yellow card) 37'; Belotti (yellow card) 71', (goal) 88'	Report	Castrovilli (red card) 61'; Ribéry 67'; Milenković (red card) 71'; Kouamé (yellow card) 84'; Amrabat (yellow card) 90+2'	Stadium: Stadio Olimpico Grande Torino; Attendance: 0 Referee: Marco Di Bello

5 February 2021 21	Fiorentina	0–2	Internazionale	Florence
20:45 CET (UTC+1)	Amrabat (yellow card) 60'; Martínez Quarta (yellow card) 75'; Pulgar (yellow card) 81'	Report	Barella 31'; Perišić (yellow card) 42', (goal) 52'	Stadium: Stadio Artemio Franchi; Attendance: 0 Referee: Federico La Penna

14 February 2021 22	Sampdoria	2–1	Fiorentina	Genoa
15:00 CET (UTC+1)	Keita 31'; Damsgaard (yellow card) 57'; Quagliarella 71'	Report	Venuti (yellow card) 34'; Vlahović 37'; Pulgar (yellow card) 61'; Bonaventura (yellow card) 79'	Stadium: Stadio Luigi Ferraris; Attendance: 0 Referee: Fabio Maresca

19 February 2021 23	Fiorentina	3–0	Spezia	Florence
18:30 CET (UTC+1)	Amrabat (yellow card) 18'; Vlahović 48'; Castrovilli 64'; Eysseric (yellow card) 75', (goal) 82'; Valero (yellow card) 77'; Martínez Quarta (yellow card) 90+2'	Report		Stadium: Stadio Artemio Franchi; Attendance: 0 Referee: Gianpaolo Calvarese

28 February 2021 24	Udinese	1–0	Fiorentina	Udine
15:00 CET (UTC+1)	Llorente (yellow card) 73'; Nestorovski 86'	Report	Martínez Quarta (yellow card) 64'; Kokorin (yellow card) 90+2'	Stadium: Stadio Friuli; Attendance: 0 Referee: Manuel Volpi

3 March 2021 25	Fiorentina	1–2	Roma	Florence
20:45 CET (UTC+1)	Spinazzola 60' (o.g.); Ribéry (yellow card) 71'	Report	Mancini (yellow card) 40'; Spinazzola 49'; Kumbulla (yellow card) 74'; Diawara 88'	Stadium: Stadio Artemio Franchi; Attendance: 0 Referee: Gianpaolo Calvarese

7 March 2021 26	Fiorentina	3–3	Parma	Florence
15:00 CET (UTC+1)	Martínez Quarta 28'; Milenković 42'; Iacoponi 90+4' (o.g.)	Report	Kucka 32' (pen.), (yellow card) 56'; Pezzella (yellow card) 62'; Kurtić 72'; Bani (yellow card) 80'; Mihăilă 90'	Stadium: Stadio Artemio Franchi; Attendance: 0 Referee: Rosario Abisso

13 March 2021 27	Benevento	1–4	Fiorentina	Benevento
18:00 CET (UTC+1)	Glik (yellow card) 36'; Ioniță 56'; Schiattarella (yellow card) 76'; Improta (yellow card) 83'	Report	Vlahović 8', 26', 45+1'; Pulgar (yellow card) 43'; Eysseric 75'	Stadium: Stadio Ciro Vigorito; Attendance: 0 Referee: Piero Giacomelli

21 March 2021 28	Fiorentina	2–3	Milan	Florence
18:00 CET (UTC+1)	Pulgar 17'; Ribéry 51'; Kouamé (yellow card) 89'	Report	Ibrahimović 9'; Çalhanoğlu (yellow card) 41', (goal) 72'; Dalot (yellow card) 47'; Díaz 57'; Meïté (yellow card) 90+2'	Stadium: Stadio Artemio Franchi; Attendance: 0 Referee: Marco Guida

3 April 2021 29	Genoa	1–1	Fiorentina	Genoa
15:00 CEST (UTC+2)	Strootman (yellow card) 2'; Destro 13'; Zajc (yellow card) 64'	Report	Vlahović 23'; Ribéry (red card) 52'; Pulgar (yellow card) 90+5'	Stadium: Stadio Luigi Ferraris; Attendance: 0 Referee: Fabio Maresca

11 April 2021 30	Fiorentina	2–3	Atalanta	Florence
20:45 CEST (UTC+2)	Pezzella (yellow card) 32'; Amrabat (yellow card) 53'; Vlahović 57', 66'; Milenković (yellow card) 72'	Report	Zapata 13', 40'; Romero (yellow card) 23'; Iličić 70' (pen.)	Stadium: Stadio Artemio Franchi; Attendance: 0 Referee: Juan Luca Sacchi

17 April 2021 31	Sassuolo	3–1	Fiorentina	Reggio Emilia
18:00 CEST (UTC+2)	Traorè (yellow card) 13'; Lopez (yellow card) 45+1', (goal) 75'; Berardi 59' (pen.), 62' (pen.); Müldür (yellow card) 70'	Report	Castrovilli (yellow card) 15'; Milenković (yellow card) 28'; Bonaventura 31'; Biraghi (yellow card) 68'; Eysseric (yellow card) 81'; Pulgar (yellow card) 90+1'	Stadium: Mapei Stadium; Attendance: 0 Referee: Gianluca Aureliano

20 April 2021 32	Hellas Verona	1–2	Fiorentina	Verona
20:45 CEST (UTC+2)	Günter (yellow card) 68'; Salcedo 72'; Sturaro (yellow card) 90+1'	Report	Bonaventura (yellow card) 19'; Vlahović 45+2' (pen.); Cáceres 65'; Kouamé (yellow card) 90+3'; Martínez Quarta (yellow card) 90+5'	Stadium: Stadio Marcantonio Bentegodi; Attendance: 0 Referee: Alessandro Prontera

25 April 2021 33	Fiorentina	1–1	Juventus	Florence
15:00 CEST (UTC+2)	Vlahović 29' (pen.); Igor (yellow card) 40'; Cáceres (yellow card) 61'; Biraghi (yellow card) 88'	Report	Morata 46'; De Ligt (yellow card) 52'	Stadium: Stadio Artemio Franchi; Attendance: 0 Referee: Davide Massa

2 May 2021 34	Bologna	3–3	Fiorentina	Bologna
15:00 CEST (UTC+2)	Soumaoro (yellow card) 20'; Palacio 31', 71', 84'; Svanberg (yellow card) 47'	Report	Vlahović 21' (pen.), 73'; Bonaventura 64'; Milenković (yellow card) 76'; Igor (yellow card) 79'	Stadium: Stadio Renato Dall'Ara; Attendance: 0 Referee: Federico Dionisi

8 May 2021 35	Fiorentina	2–0	Lazio	Florence
20:45 CEST (UTC+2)	Venuti (yellow card) 5'; Vlahović 32', 89', (yellow card) 44'; Pezzella (yellow card) 58'; Cáceres (yellow card) 90+2'	Report	Acerbi (yellow card) 28'; Lucas (yellow card) 60'; Radu (yellow card) 66'; Luiz Felipe (yellow card) 74'; Pereira (yellow card) 77' (yellow-red card) 90+5'; Cataldi (yellow card) 90+1'; Akpa Akpro (yellow card) 90+6'	Stadium: Stadio Artemio Franchi; Attendance: 0 Referee: Fabio Maresca

12 May 2021 36	Cagliari	0–0	Fiorentina	Cagliari
18:30 CEST (UTC+2)	Lykogiannis (yellow card) 35'	Report	Pulgar (yellow card) 27'; Cáceres (yellow card) 67'	Stadium: Sardegna Arena; Attendance: 0 Referee: Maurizio Mariani

16 May 2021 37	Fiorentina	0–2	Napoli	Florence
12:30 CEST (UTC+2)	Milenković (yellow card) 31'; Ribéry (yellow card) 43'; Cáceres (yellow card) 49'; Drągowski (red card) 56'; Castrovilli (yellow card) 61'; Pezzella (yellow card) 80'	Report	Rrahmani (yellow card) 22'; Insigne (penalty missed) 56', 56'; Venuti 67' (o.g.); Contini (yellow card) 68'	Stadium: Stadio Artemio Franchi; Attendance: 0 Referee: Rosario Abisso
Note: Drągowski was sent off for dissent while a substitute.

22 May 2021 38	Crotone	0–0	Fiorentina	Crotone
20:45 CEST (UTC+2)	Djidji (yellow card) 44'; Zanellato (yellow card) 83'	Report	Pulgar (yellow card) 25'; Castrovilli (yellow card) 44'	Stadium: Stadio Ezio Scida; Attendance: 0 Referee: Eugenio Abbattista

=== Coppa Italia ===
28 October 2020 Third round	Fiorentina	2–1	Padova	Florence
18:00 CET (UTC+1)	Venuti 10'; Callejón 32'; Pulgar (yellow card) 87'	Report	Anđelković (yellow card) 28'; Buglio (yellow card) 41'; Hallfreðsson (yellow card) 43'; Santini 55'; Pelegatti (yellow card) 85'	Stadium: Stadio Artemio Franchi; Referee: Alberto Santoro

25 November 2020 Fourth round	Udinese	0–1 (a.e.t.)	Fiorentina	Udine
17:30 CET (UTC+1)	Samir (yellow card) 60'; Makengo (yellow card) 88'; Jajalo (yellow card) 99'	Report	Pulgar (yellow card) 34'; Cáceres (yellow card) 56'; Biraghi (yellow card) 90+2'; Montiel 112'	Stadium: Dacia Arena; Referee: Marco Serra

13 January 2021 Round of 16	Fiorentina	1–2 (a.e.t.)	Internazionale	Florence
15:00 CET (UTC+1)	Eysseric (yellow card) 6'; Bonaventura (yellow card) 27'; Kouamé 57', (yellow card) 57'; Igor (yellow card) 80'	Report	Vidal 40' (pen.), (yellow card) 84'; Škriniar (yellow card) 45'; Eriksen (yellow card) 79'; Hakimi (yellow card) 112'; Ranocchia (yellow card) 117'; Lukaku 119', (yellow card) 120+3'; Sánchez (yellow card) 120+1'	Stadium: Stadio Artemio Franchi; Referee: Davide Massa

== Statistics ==
=== Appearances and goals ===
No.	Pos	Nat	Player	Total		Serie A		Coppa Italia	
No.	Pos	Nat	Player	Apps	Goals	Apps	Goals	Apps	Goals
Goalkeepers
1	GK	(Italy) ITA	Pietro Terracciano	7	0	2+2	0	3	0
21	GK	(Italy) ITA	Antonio Rosati	0	0	0	0	0	0
33	GK	(Italy) ITA	Federico Brancolini	0	0	0	0	0	0
69	GK	(Poland) POL	Bartłomiej Drągowski	36	0	36	0	0	0
Defenders
2	DF	(Argentina) ARG	Lucas Martínez Quarta	23	1	15+6	1	2	0
3	DF	(Italy) ITA	Cristiano Biraghi	38	1	31+4	1	2+1	0
4	DF	(Serbia) SRB	Nikola Milenković	37	3	34	3	3	0
15	DF	(Uruguay) URU	Maximiliano Olivera	2	0	1+1	0	0	0
20	DF	(Argentina) ARG	Germán Pezzella	33	1	32	1	1	0
22	DF	(Uruguay) URU	Martín Cáceres	31	2	26+3	2	0+2	0
23	DF	(Italy) ITA	Lorenzo Venuti	30	1	21+7	0	1+1	1
25	DF	(France) FRA	Kévin Malcuit	5	0	2+3	0	0	0
27	DF	(Italy) ITA	Antonio Barreca	4	0	1+2	0	1	0
98	DF	(Brazil) BRA	Igor	24	0	13+8	0	2+1	0
Midfielders
5	MF	(Italy) ITA	Giacomo Bonaventura	35	3	27+7	3	1	0
6	MF	(Spain) ESP	Borja Valero	21	0	4+16	0	1	0
10	MF	(Italy) ITA	Gaetano Castrovilli	37	5	29+5	5	2+1	0
28	MF	(Spain) ESP	Tòfol Montiel	3	1	0+2	0	0+1	1
34	MF	(Morocco) MAR	Sofyan Amrabat	33	0	28+3	0	2	0
78	MF	(Chile) CHI	Erick Pulgar	33	1	21+10	1	2	0
92	MF	(France) FRA	Valentin Eysseric	18	2	6+10	2	1+1	0
Forwards
7	FW	(France) FRA	Franck Ribéry	30	2	28+1	2	0+1	0
9	FW	(Serbia) SRB	Dušan Vlahović	40	21	34+3	21	1+2	0
11	FW	(Ivory Coast) CIV	Christian Kouamé	36	2	9+24	1	2+1	1
77	FW	(Spain) ESP	José Callejón	22	1	6+14	0	1+1	1
91	FW	(Russia) RUS	Aleksandr Kokorin	4	0	0+4	0	0	0
Players transferred out during the season
8	MF	(Ghana) GHA	Alfred Duncan	5	0	2+2	0	1	0
17	DF	(Italy) ITA	Federico Ceccherini	3	0	3	0	0	0
18	MF	(Italy) ITA	Riccardo Saponara	3	0	0+2	0	1	0
21	DF	(Spain) ESP	Pol Lirola	13	0	4+8	0	0+1	0
25	FW	(Italy) ITA	Federico Chiesa	0	0	0	0	0	0
32	DF	(Italy) ITA	Christian Dalle Mura	0	0	0	0	0	0
63	FW	(Italy) ITA	Patrick Cutrone	13	0	0+11	0	1+1	0

Last updated: 22 May 2021
Source: Competitions

=== Goalscorers ===
As of 8 May 2021

Rank	No.	Pos	Nat	Name	Serie A	Coppa Italia	Total
1	9	FW	(Serbia)	Dušan Vlahović	20	0	20
2	10	MF	(Italy)	Gaetano Castrovilli	5	0	5
3	4	DF	(Serbia)	Nikola Milenković	2	0	2
3	11	FW	(Ivory Coast)	Christian Kouamé	1	1	2
5	3	DF	(Italy)	Cristiano Biraghi	1	0	1
5	5	MF	(Italy)	Giacomo Bonaventura	1	0	1
5	7	FW	(France)	Franck Ribéry	1	0	1
5	20	DF	(Argentina)	Germán Pezzella	1	0	1
5	22	DF	(Uruguay)	Martín Cáceres	1	0	1
5	23	DF	(Italy)	Lorenzo Venuti	0	1	1
5	24	MF	(Italy)	Federico Chiesa	1	0	1
5	28	MF	(Spain)	Tòfol Montiel	0	1	1
5	77	MF	(Spain)	José Callejón	0	1	1
5	92	MF	(France)	Valentin Eysseric	1	0	1
Own goal					1	0	1
Totals					25	4	29
