= Dalbert (footballer) =

Brazilian football player (born 1993)

Personal information
- Full name: Dalbert Henrique Chagas Estevão
- Date of birth: 8 September 1993 (age 33)
- Place of birth: Barra Mansa, Rio de Janeiro, Brazil
- Height: 1.81 m (5 ft 11 in)
- Positions: Left-back; left wing-back

Team information
- Current team: América Mineiro
- Number: 29

Youth career
- 2008–2012: Barra Mansa
- 2012: Fluminense
- 2013: Flamengo

Senior career*
Years	Team	Apps	(Gls)
2013–2015	Académico de Viseu	39	(1)
2015	Vitória Guimarães B	9	(0)
2015–2016	Vitória Guimarães	25	(0)
2016–2017	Nice	33	(0)
2017–2023	Inter Milan	24	(0)
2019–2020	→ Fiorentina (loan)	31	(0)
2020–2021	→ Rennes (loan)	13	(0)
2021–2022	→ Cagliari (loan)	28	(0)
2023	Internacional	9	(0)
2024–2025	Sport	36	(0)
2025–	América Mineiro	3	(0)
- * Club domestic league appearances and goals as of 17 December 2025

Dalbert Henrique Chagas Estevão (born 8 September 1993), known as Dalbert, is a Brazilian professional football player who plays as a left-back or left wing-back for Campeonato Brasileiro Série B club América Mineiro.

== Club career ==
=== Académico de Viseu ===
Dalbert started his career in Brazil and moved to Portugal for Académico de Viseu in 2013. He made his league debut against C.F. União on 9 February 2014. He scored his first league goal for the club against Desportivo Aves on 4 January 2015, scoring in the 11th minute.

=== Vitória Guimarães ===
Dalbert made his league debut against S.C. Braga on 27 September 2015.

He also played for the B side, making his debut against Santa Clara on 8 August 2015.

=== OGC Nice ===
Dalbert joined OGC Nice in 2016 from Vitória SC. He made his Ligue 1 debut on 14 August 2016 against Stade Rennais playing the full match.

=== Inter Milan ===
On 9 August 2017, Dalbert joined Inter Milan. He made his debut in a 3–1 victory over A.S. Roma. Dalbert scored his first goal for the club in the Coppa Italia on 13 January 2019, scoring in the 45th+1st minute.

=== Fiorentina ===
On 29 August 2019, Dalbert was loaned to ACF Fiorentina for the duration of the 2019–20 season. He made his league debut against Genoa on 1 September 2019.

=== Rennes ===
In October 2020, Inter Milan sent Dalbert on a season-long loan to Ligue 1 club Rennes. He made his league debut against Dijon on 16 October 2020.

=== Cagliari ===
On 21 July 2021, Serie A club Cagliari announced the signing of Dalbert on a season-long loan from Inter, with an option to make the move permanent. He made his league debut against Spezia on 23 August 2021.

=== Internacional ===
On 6 September 2023, after his contract with Inter Milan expired, Dalbert returned to his homeland Brazil, signing with Série A club Internacional until December 2023. He made his league debut for the club against Athletico Paranaense on 21 September 2023.

== Career statistics ==
=== Club ===
As of match played 15 May 2022

Club	Season	League			Cup		Continental		Total	
Club	Season	Division	Apps	Goals	Apps	Goals	Apps	Goals	Apps	Goals
Académico de Viseu	2013–14	Segunda Liga	4	0	0	0	—		4	0
Académico de Viseu	2014–15	Segunda Liga	35	1	6	1	—		41	2
Académico de Viseu	Total		39	1	6	1	—		45	2
Vitória Guimarães B	2015–16	LigaPro	9	0	—		—		9	0
Vitória Guimarães	2015–16	Primeira Liga	25	0	2	0	0	0	27	0
Nice	2016–17	Ligue 1	33	0	1	0	4 (Note: Appearance(s) in UEFA Europa League)	0	38	0
Nice	2017–18	Ligue 1	0	0	0	0	2 (Note: Appearance(s) in UEFA Champions League)	0	2	0
Nice	Total		33	0	1	0	6	0	40	0
Inter Milan	2017–18	Serie A	13	0	1	0	—		14	0
Inter Milan	2018–19	Serie A	11	0	1	1	0	0	12	1
Inter Milan	2022–23	Serie A	0	0	0	0	0	0	0	0
Inter Milan	Total		24	0	2	1	0	0	26	1
Fiorentina (loan)	2019–20	Serie A	31	0	3	0	—		34	0
Rennes (loan)	2020–21	Ligue 1	13	0	1	0	4	0	18	0
Cagliari (loan)	2021–22	Serie A	28	0	3	0	—		31	0
Career total			202	1	18	2	10	0	230	3

== Honours ==
2022–23
