= Federico Brancolini =

Italian footballer

Personal information
- Date of birth: 14 July 2001 (age 25)
- Place of birth: Modena, Italy
- Height: 1.98 m (6 ft 6 in)
- Position: Goalkeeper

Team information
- Current team: Novara
- Number: 33

Youth career
- Modena
- 2017–2018: Fiorentina

Senior career*
Years	Team	Apps	(Gls)
2016–2017	Modena	0	(0)
2018–2022	Fiorentina	1	(0)
2022–2024	Lecce	0	(0)
2024–2026	Empoli	0	(0)
2025–2026	→ Salernitana (loan)	0	(0)
2026–	Novara	5	(0)

International career^{‡}
2018–2019	Italy U18	8	(0)
2019–2020	Italy U19	7	(0)
- * Club domestic league appearances and goals as of 26 September 2026 ‡ National team caps and goals as of 9 October 2021

Federico Brancolini (born 14 July 2001) is an Italian professional footballer who plays as a goalkeeper for Serie C Group A club Novara.

== Club career ==
Brancolini is a youth product of Modena, and joined the youth academy of ACF Fiorentina in 2017. Brancolini made his professional debut with Fiorentina in a 4–0 Serie A win over Bologna on 29 June 2020.

On 5 June 2022, Brancolini signed a five-year contract with Lecce.

In August 2024, Brancolini joined Empoli on a three-year contract.

On 19 August 2025, Brancolini moved on loan to Salernitana in Serie C, with an option to buy.

== Career statistics ==
As of match played 1 November 2023

Appearances and goals by club, season and competition
Club	Season	League			National Cup		Continental		Other		Total	
Club	Season	Division	Apps	Goals	Apps	Goals	Apps	Goals	Apps	Goals	Apps	Goals
Fiorentina	2017–18	Serie A	0	0	0	0	—		—		0	0
Fiorentina	2018–19	Serie A	0	0	0	0	—		—		0	0
Fiorentina	2019–20	Serie A	1	0	0	0	—		—		1	0
Fiorentina	2020–21	Serie A	0	0	0	0	—		—		0	0
Fiorentina	2021–22	Serie A	0	0	0	0	—		—		0	0
Fiorentina	Total		1	0	0	0	—		—		1	0
Lecce	2022–23	Serie A	0	0	0	0	—		—		0	0
Lecce	2023–24	Serie A	0	0	1	0	—		—		1	0
Lecce	Total		0	0	1	0	—		—		1	0
Career total			1	0	1	0	0	0	0	0	2	0
