= Pietro Terracciano =

Italian footballer (born 1990)

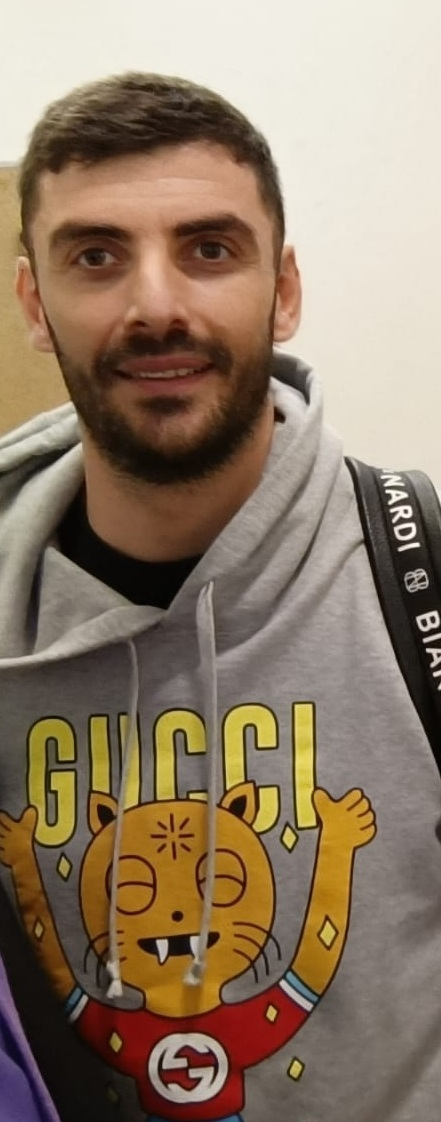
- Terracciano in 2024

Personal information
- Full name: Pietro Terracciano
- Date of birth: 8 March 1990 (age 36)
- Place of birth: San Felice a Cancello, Italy
- Height: 1.93 m (6 ft 4 in)
- Position: Goalkeeper

Team information
- Current team: AC Milan
- Number: 1

Youth career
- Avellino

Senior career*
Years	Team	Apps	(Gls)
2009–2011	Nocerina	23	(0)
2010–2011	→ Milazzo (loan)	20	(0)
2011–2017	Catania	8	(0)
2013–2014	→ Avellino (loan)	13	(0)
2015–2017	→ Salernitana (loan)	54	(0)
2017–2019	Empoli	11	(0)
2019	→ Fiorentina (loan)	2	(0)
2019–2025	Fiorentina	108	(0)
2025–	AC Milan	2	(0)
- * Club domestic league appearances and goals as of 22:00, 20 September 2025 (UTC)

Pietro Terracciano (born 8 March 1990) is an Italian professional footballer who plays as a goalkeeper for Serie A club AC Milan.

== Club career ==
=== Nocerina ===
Terracciano began his professional career with Nocerina before spending the 2010–11 season on loan at Lega Pro Seconda Divisione side Milazzo. After beginning his professional career in the lower ranks of Italian football, he transferred to Serie A outfit, Catania in June 2011.

=== Catania ===
On 30 June 2011, Catania confirmed the outright signing of Terracciano on a permanent basis from newly promoted Serie B side Nocerina. The player began the season as the fourth choice goalkeeper at the Sicilian club, behind Argentine international, Mariano Andújar, Italian veteran Andrea Campagnolo, and former Slovak U-21 international, Tomáš Košický, and remained fourth choice following the new arrival of Juan Pablo Carrizo and the departure of Andújar. On 21 April 2012, because of the expulsion of Carrizo in the last match, he made his Serie A debut with the club. He remained third choice during the 2012–13 Serie A campaign, behind Andújar and Alberto Frison.

On 23 July 2013, Terracciano signed for Avellino on a season-long loan deal with an option to purchase the player outright following the 2013–14 Serie B season. After having played for Catania again in the 2014–15 Serie B, he moved to Salernitana on a two-year loan until 2017.

=== Fiorentina ===
On 22 January 2019, Terracciano joined Fiorentina on loan until 30 June 2019. On 7 July 2019, Terracciano permanently joined Fiorentina.

=== AC Milan ===
On 18 July 2025, Terracciano joined AC Milan on a one-year contract, with an optional extra year.

== Career statistics ==
As of match played 20 September 2025

Appearances and goals by club, season and competition
Club	Season	League			Coppa Italia		Europe		Other		Total	
Club	Season	Division	Apps	Goals	Apps	Goals	Apps	Goals	Apps	Goals	Apps	Goals
Avellino	2009–10	Serie B	0	0	0	0	—		—		0	0
Nocerina	2009–10	Lega Pro 2 - B	23	0	1	0	—		—		24	0
Milazzo (loan)	2010–11	Lega Pro 2 - C	20	0	—		—		2 (Note: Appearances in Lega Pro 2 play-offs)	0	22	0
Catania	2011–12	Serie A	2	0	0	0	—		—		2	0
Catania	2014–15	Serie A	6	0	0	0	—		—		6	0
Catania	Total		8	0	0	0	—		—		8	0
Avellino (loan)	2013–14	Serie B	13	0	0	0	—		—		13	0
Salernitana (loan)	2015–16	Serie B	33	0	1	0	—		—		34	0
Salernitana (loan)	2016–17	Serie B	21	0	2	0	—		—		23	0
Salernitana (loan)	Total		54	0	3	0	—		—		57	0
Empoli	2017–18	Serie B	3	0	0	0	—		—		3	0
Empoli	2018–19	Serie A	8	0	1	0	—		—		9	0
Empoli	Total		11	0	1	0	—		—		12	0
Fiorentina (loan)	2018–19	Serie A	2	0	0	0	—		—		2	0
Fiorentina	2019–20	Serie A	7	0	3	0	—		—		10	0
Fiorentina	2020–21	Serie A	4	0	3	0	—		—		7	0
Fiorentina	2021–22	Serie A	32	0	4	0	—		—		36	0
Fiorentina	2022–23	Serie A	29	0	4	0	11 (Note: Appearances in UEFA Europa Conference League)	0	—		44	0
Fiorentina	2023–24	Serie A	33	0	2	0	11	0	1 (Note: Appearance in Supercoppa Italiana)	0	47	0
Fiorentina	2024–25	Serie A	3	0	1	0	6 (Note: Appearances in UEFA Conference League)	0	—		10	0
Fiorentina	Fiorentina total		110	0	17	0	28	0	1	0	156	0
AC Milan	2025–26	Serie A	2	0	0	0	—		—		2	0
Career total			257	0	22	0	28	0	3	0	310	0

== Honours ==
Fiorentina

- Coppa Italia runner-up: 2022–23
- UEFA Europa Conference League runner-up: 2022–23, 2023–24

=== Individual ===
- UEFA Europa Conference League Team of the Season: 2023–24
