= Pierluigi Pinto =

Italian footballer

Personal information
- Date of birth: 22 September 1998 (age 28)
- Place of birth: Brindisi, Italy
- Height: 1.88 m (6 ft 2 in)
- Position: Defender

Team information
- Current team: Sora
- Number: 26

Youth career
- –2018: Fiorentina

Senior career*
Years	Team	Apps	(Gls)
2018–2021	Fiorentina	0	(0)
2018–2019	→ Arezzo (loan)	32	(0)
2019–2020	→ Salernitana (loan)	4	(0)
2020	→ Bari (loan)	0	(0)
2021–2022	Teramo	21	(0)
2022–2024	Carrarese	0	(0)
2024–2025	Nardò	9	(0)
2025	Virtus Francavilla	8	(0)
2025–2026	Chieti	12	(1)
2026–	Sora	0	(0)
- * Club domestic league appearances and goals as of 18 January 2026

Pierluigi Pinto (born 22 September 1998) is an Italian football player who plays as a defender for Serie D club Sora.

== Career ==
=== Fiorentina ===
Born in Brindisi, Pinto was a youth exponent of Fiorentina.

==== Loan to Arezzo ====
On 13 July 2018, Pinto and Luca Mosti were loaned to Serie C club Arezzo on a season-long loan deal. On 16 September he made his professional debut, in Serie C, for Arezzo in a 1–0 away win over Lucchese, he played the entire match. He became Arezzo's first-choice early in the season. From September 2018 to March 2019 he played 29 consecutive entire matches until he was replaced by Lorenzo Burzigotti in the 57th minute of a 3–0 away defeat against Carrarese. Pinto ended his season-long to Arezzo with 37 appearances, including 36 as a starter, and he helped the club to reach the quarter-finals of the play-off, however the lost 4–2 on aggregate against Pisa.

==== Loan to Salernitana and Bari ====
On 29 August 2019, Pinto joined Serie B club Salernitana on loan with an option to purchase. Three months later, on 2 November, Pinto made his debut for the club and in Serie B as a starter in a 2–1 home win over Virtus Entella, he was replaced by Paweł Jaroszyński after 85 minutes. Four weeks later, on 30 November, he played his first entire match for the club, a 1–1 home draw against Ascoli. In January 2020, his loan was terminated and he returned to Fiorentina leaving Salernitana with only 4 appearances, but all as a starter, remaining an unused substitute for 13 other matches during the loan.

On 31 January 2020, Pinto was loaned to Serie C club Bari. However he remained always an unused substitute without playing any match for the club.

=== Teramo ===
He did not play in the 2020–21 season and his contract with Fiorentina ended at the end of the season.

On 12 November 2021, he signed with Serie C club Teramo.

=== Carrarese ===
On 11 July 2022, Pinto signed a two-year contract with Carrarese. He made no appearances through his contract with Carrarese, missing most of the time with knee injuries.

== Career statistics ==
=== Club ===
As of match played 3 April 2022

Club	Season	League			Cup		Europe		Other		Total	
Club	Season	League	Apps	Goals	Apps	Goals	Apps	Goals	Apps	Goals	Apps	Goals
Arezzo (loan)	2018–19	Serie C	32	0	0	0	—		5 (Note: All appearance(s) in Serie C play-off.)	0	37	0
Salernitana (loan)	2019–20	Serie B	4	0	0	0	—		—		4	0
Bari (loan)	2019–20	Serie C	0	0	—		—		—		0	0
Teramo	2021–22	Serie C	18	0	—		—		—		18	0
Career total			54	0	0	0	—		5	0	59	0
