= Julián Illanes =

Argentine footballer

Personal information
- Full name: Julián Illanes Minucci
- Date of birth: 10 March 1997 (age 29)
- Place of birth: Córdoba, Argentina
- Height: 1.88 m (6 ft 2 in)
- Position: Centre-back

Team information
- Current team: Arezzo

Senior career*
Years	Team	Apps	(Gls)
2014–2017	Instituto	22	(1)
2017–2021	Fiorentina	0	(0)
2018–2019	→ Argentinos Juniors (loan)	0	(0)
2019–2020	→ Avellino (loan)	25	(1)
2020	→ Chievo (loan)	0	(0)
2021	→ Avellino (loan)	18	(0)
2021–2022	Pescara	23	(1)
2022–2024	Avellino	8	(1)
2023	→ Novara (loan)	13	(0)
2023–2024	→ Carrarese (loan)	30	(1)
2024–2026	Carrarese	62	(3)
2026–	Arezzo	0	(0)
- * Club domestic league appearances and goals as of 13 May 2026

Julián Illanes Minucci (born 10 March 1997) is an Argentine professional footballer who plays as a centre-back for Serie B club Arezzo.

== Career ==
Illanes began his career with Instituto. He made his senior debut in a Copa Argentina tie with Arsenal de Sarandí on 23 July 2014, prior to featuring in Primera B Nacional for the first time on the final day of the 2014 season during a victory away to Guaraní Antonio Franco on 6 December. Illanes scored his first professional goal in February 2016 against Estudiantes. On 18 January 2017, Serie A side Fiorentina signed Illanes. In July 2018, Illanes was loaned to Argentinos Juniors of the Argentine Primera División. His loan was terminated in January after not featuring. Illanes joined Avellino on loan on 20 August 2019.

On 23 September 2020, after scoring once (versus Bari) in twenty-six games for Avellino, Illanes joined Serie B club Chievo on a season-long loan. He made his debut in a Coppa Italia second round defeat to Catanzaro on 30 September. His loan was cancelled on 11 January 2021, after he had failed to make a league appearance for the club; appearing on the bench ten times. Illanes was immediately loaned back out by Fiorentina, as the centre-back agreed a return to Avellino of Serie C.

On 19 July 2021, he joined Pescara on a permanent basis.

On 18 August 2022, Illanes returned to Avellino once again. On 19 January 2023, he was loaned to Novara until the end of the season. On 1 August 2023, Illanes was loaned to Carrarese with an option to buy.

== Career statistics ==
As of 12 January 2021.

Club statistics
Club	Season	League			Cup		League Cup		Continental		Other		Total	
Club	Season	Division	Apps	Goals	Apps	Goals	Apps	Goals	Apps	Goals	Apps	Goals	Apps	Goals
Instituto	2014	Primera B Nacional	1	0	2	0	—		—		0	0	3	0
Instituto	2015	Primera B Nacional	2	0	1	0	—		—		0	0	3	0
Instituto	2016	Primera B Nacional	19	1	0	0	—		—		0	0	19	1
Instituto	2016–17	Primera B Nacional	0	0	0	0	—		—		0	0	0	0
Instituto	Total		22	1	3	0	—		—		0	0	25	1
Fiorentina	2016–17	Serie A	0	0	0	0	—		0	0	0	0	0	0
Fiorentina	2017–18	Serie A	0	0	0	0	—		—		0	0	0	0
Fiorentina	2018–19	Serie A	0	0	0	0	—		—		0	0	0	0
Fiorentina	2019–20	Serie A	0	0	0	0	—		—		0	0	0	0
Fiorentina	2020–21	Serie A	0	0	0	0	—		—		0	0	0	0
Fiorentina	Total		0	0	0	0	—		0	0	0	0	0	0
Argentinos Juniors (loan)	2018–19	Primera División	0	0	0	0	0	0	0	0	0	0	0	0
Avellino (loan)	2019–20	Serie C	26	1	2	0	0	0	—		0	0	28	1
Chievo (loan)	2020–21	Serie B	0	0	0	0	0	0	—		0	0	0	0
Avellino (loan)	2020–21	Serie C	0	0	0	0	0	0	—		0	0	0	0
Career total			48	2	5	0	0	0	0	0	0	0	53	2
