= Luca Zanon =

Italian footballer (born 1996)

Personal information
- Date of birth: 4 July 1996 (age 30)
- Place of birth: Camposampiero, Italy
- Height: 1.77 m (5 ft 10 in)
- Position: Defender

Team information
- Current team: Tau Calcio Altopascio
- Number: 3

Youth career
- –2013: Venezia
- 2013–2015: Fiorentina

Senior career*
Years	Team	Apps	(Gls)
2015–2019	Fiorentina	0	(0)
2015–2016	→ Virtus Entella (loan)	5	(0)
2016–2017	→ Pistoiese (loan)	23	(0)
2017–2018	→ Ternana (loan)	7	(0)
2018–2019	→ Robur Siena (loan)	26	(0)
2019–2021	Pordenone	2	(0)
2021–2022	Aglianese	28	(1)
2023–2024	Sant'Agostino		
2024–	Tau Calcio Altopascio	7	(0)

International career
2014	Italy U-18	1	(0)
2015	Italy U-20	1	(0)
- * Club domestic league appearances and goals as of 17 November 2024

Luca Zanon (born 4 July 1996) is an Italian football player who plays for Serie D club Tau Calcio Altopascio.

== Club career ==
He made his Serie B debut for Virtus Entella on 22 September 2015 in a game against Cagliari.

On 22 July 2019, Zanon signed a two-year contract with Pordenone.

On 11 September 2021, he moved to Aglianese in Serie D.
