= Niccolò Gucci =

Italian footballer (born 1990)

Personal information
- Date of birth: 3 June 1990 (age 36)
- Place of birth: Bagno a Ripoli, Italy
- Height: 1.83 m (6 ft 0 in)
- Position: Forward

Team information
- Current team: Fano

Senior career*
Years	Team	Apps	(Gls)
2008	Figline	0	(0)
2008–2009	Fortis Juventus	19	(5)
2009–2011	Scandicci	65	(24)
2011–2012	Perugia	12	(3)
2012	→ Borgo a Buggiano (loan)	12	(5)
2012–2013	Pistoiese	31	(16)
2013	Poggibonsi	8	(0)
2013–2014	Correggese	18	(12)
2014–2017	Fano	82	(36)
2017	Varese	8	(1)
2017–2019	Pro Patria	66	(23)
2019–2021	Pistoiese	43	(8)
2021–2022	Vis Pesaro	51	(11)
2022–2025	Arezzo	80	(21)
2025	→ Livorno (loan)	6	(0)
2025–	Fano	0	(0)
- * Club domestic league appearances and goals as of 4 May 2025

Niccolò Gucci (born 3 June 1990) is an Italian professional footballer who plays as a forward for Fano.

== Career ==
Born in Bagno a Ripoli, Gucci started his career in Serie D and Lega Pro Seconda Divisione clubs.

For the 2012–13 Serie D season, he joined to Pistoiese. Gucci played 31 matches and scored 16 goals.

On 1 November 2013, he moved to Correggese.

On 15 July 2014, he signed with Serie D side Fano. Gucci played three years for Fano, winning the promotion on his second year. He made his Serie C debut on 27 August 2016 against Südtirol.

On 11 July 2017, he joined to Serie D club Pro Patria. He played two seasons in the club, winning the promotion on his first year.

On 10 July 2019, he returned to Pistoiese, this time on Serie C.

On 7 January 2021, he moved to Vis Pesaro.

On 18 November 2022, Gucci joined Serie D club Arezzo.
