= Luca Mosti =

Italian footballer

Personal information
- Date of birth: 23 May 1998 (age 28)
- Place of birth: Massa, Italy
- Height: 1.81 m (5 ft 11 in)
- Position: Right back

Team information
- Current team: Campodarsego

Youth career
- Fiorentina

Senior career*
Years	Team	Apps	(Gls)
2018–2019	Fiorentina	0	(0)
2018	→ Arezzo (loan)	0	(0)
2019	→ Bisceglie (loan)	1	(0)
2019–2020	Arezzo	9	(0)
2020	→ Pergolettese (loan)	2	(0)
2021	Fermana	6	(0)
2021	PDHAE	12	(0)
2021–2022	Ghiviborgo	17	(5)
2022–2023	Città di Castello	29	(3)
2023–	Campodarsego	17	(1)
- * Club domestic league appearances and goals as of 20 December 2023

Luca Mosti (born 23 May 1998) is an Italian professional footballer who plays as a right back for Serie D club Campodarsego.

== Club career ==
On 22 July 2019, he returned to Arezzo, signing a 3-year contract. On 31 January 2020, he was loaned to Pergolettese for the rest of the season. His contract with Arezzo was terminated on 27 November 2020.

On 25 February 2021, he signed with Fermana.
