= Erald Lakti =

Italian-born Albanian footballer (born 2000)

Personal information
- Date of birth: 6 January 2000 (age 26)
- Place of birth: Prato, Italy
- Height: 1.75 m (5 ft 9 in)
- Position: Midfielder

Team information
- Current team: Arzignano
- Number: 6

Youth career
- –2019: Fiorentina

Senior career*
Years	Team	Apps	(Gls)
2019–2021	Fiorentina	0	(0)
2019–2020	→ Gubbio (loan)	23	(0)
2020–2021	→ Renate (loan)	25	(0)
2021–2023	Lecco	47	(2)
2023–	Arzignano	105	(15)

International career^{‡}
2016	Albania U17	2	(0)
2017–2018	Albania U19	5	(0)
2021	Albania U20	1	(0)
2021	Albania U21	2	(0)
- * Club domestic league appearances and goals as of 30 April 2026 ‡ National team caps and goals as of 12 October 2021

Erald Lakti (born 6 January 2000) is a professional footballer who plays as a midfielder for Serie C Group A club Arzignano. Born in Italy, Lakti represents Albania internationally.

== Club career ==
=== Fiorentina ===
He is a product of Fiorentina youth teams and started playing for their Under-19 squad in the 2017–18 season.

He was called up to the senior squad for the last game of the 2018–19 Serie A season, but remained on the bench.

He made his debut for the senior squad in 2019 International Champions Cup.

==== Loan to Gubbio ====
On 1 August 2019 he joined Serie C club Gubbio on loan.

He made his professional Serie C debut for Gubbio on 25 August 2019 in a game against Triestina. He substituted Rafa Muñoz in the 52nd minute. He first appeared in the starting lineup on 1 September 2019 against Virtus Verona.

==== Loan to Renate ====
On 22 September 2020, he joined Renate on loan.

=== Lecco ===
On 8 July 2021, he joined Lecco on a permanent basis.

=== Arzignano ===
On 16 July 2023, Lakti signed a two-year contract with Arzignano.

== International career ==
Lakti represents Albania internationally at youth level.
