= Marco Marozzi =

Italian association football player

Personal information
- Date of birth: 7 January 1999 (age 27)
- Place of birth: Macerata, Italy
- Height: 1.85 m (6 ft 1 in)
- Position: Midfielder

Youth career
- –2013: United Civitanova
- 2013–2018: Fiorentina

Senior career*
Years	Team	Apps	(Gls)
2018–2021	Fiorentina	0	(0)
2018–2019	→ Fermana (loan)	12	(0)
2019–2020	→ Virtus Francavilla (loan)	16	(1)
2020–2021	→ Ravenna (loan)	31	(1)
Total		59	(2)
- * Club domestic league appearances and goals

Marco Marozzi (born 7 January 1999) is an Italian former footballer who plays as a midfielder.

== Club career ==
=== Fiorentina ===
He is a product of Fiorentina youth teams and was first included on their Under-19 squad for the 2016–17 season.

==== Loan to Fermana ====
On 12 July 2018, Marozzi joined Serie C club Fermana on a season-long loan. Three months later, on 17 October, he made his professional debut in Serie C for Fermana as a 62nd-minute substitute replacing Gabriele Zerbo in a 2–0 home win over Gubbio. On 3 April 2019, Marozzi played his first match as a starter for the club, a 2–0 away defeat against Alma Juventus Fano, he was replaced by Gabriele Zerbo in the 59th minute. Marozzi ended his season-long loan to Fermana with only 12 appearances, including 11 of them as a substitute, but he didn't play any entire matches during the loan, he also helped the club to reach the play-off but Fermana loss 2–0 against Monza in the first round, he remained an unused substitute.

==== Loan to Virtus Francavilla ====
On 20 August 2019, Marozzi was loaned to Serie C club Virtus Francavilla on a season-long loan deal. On 15 September he made his debut for the club as a substitute replacing Francesco Puntoriere for the last 21 minutes of a 2–2 away draw against Paganese. Three months later, on 15 December, he scored his first professional goal, as a substitute, in the 92nd minute of a 2–1 away defeat against Viterbese Castrense. On 22 January 2020, Marozzi played his first match as a starter for the club, a 2–1 away win over Reggina, he was replaced by Federico Vàzquez after 61 minutes. Marozzi helped the club to reach the play-offs, however Francavilla loss 3–2 against Catania in the first round. Marozzi ended his season-long loan to Virtus Francavilla with 17 appearances, 1 goal and 2 assists.

==== Loan to Ravenna ====
On 6 September 2020, Marozzi was signed by Serie C side Ravenna on a season-long loan deal. On 27 September he made his debut for the club as a substitute replacing Daniele Ferretti in the 75th minute of a 2–1 home defeat against Südtirol. On 8 October he scored his first goal for the club, as a substitute, in the 89th minute of a 2–1 home win over Vis Pesaro. Two weeks later, on 21 October, Marozzi played his first match as a starter for Ravenna, a 2–0 home win over Virtus Verona, he was replaced in the 52nd minute by Marco Fiorani. On 24 March 2021, Marozzi played his first entire match for the club, a 0–0 away draw against Sambenedettese. Marozzi ended his loan to Ravenna with 34 appearances, 1 goal and 1 assist, he also played the play-out, however Ravenna loss 4–0 on aggregate against Legnago and was relegated in Serie D.

== Career statistics ==
=== Club ===
As of 18 July 2021

Club	Season	League			Cup		Europe		Other		Total	
Club	Season	League	Apps	Goals	Apps	Goals	Apps	Goals	Apps	Goals	Apps	Goals
Fermana (loan)	2018–19	Serie C	12	0	0	0	—		—		12	0
Virtus Francavilla (loan)	2019–20	Serie C	16	1	0	0	—		1 (Note: All appearance(s) in Serie C play-off.)	0	17	1
Ravenna (loan)	2020–21	Serie C	32	1	0	0	—		2 (Note: All appearance(s) in Serie C play-out.)	0	34	1
Career total			60	2	0	0	—		3	0	63	2
