= 2023 Coppa Italia final =

75th Coppa Italia final
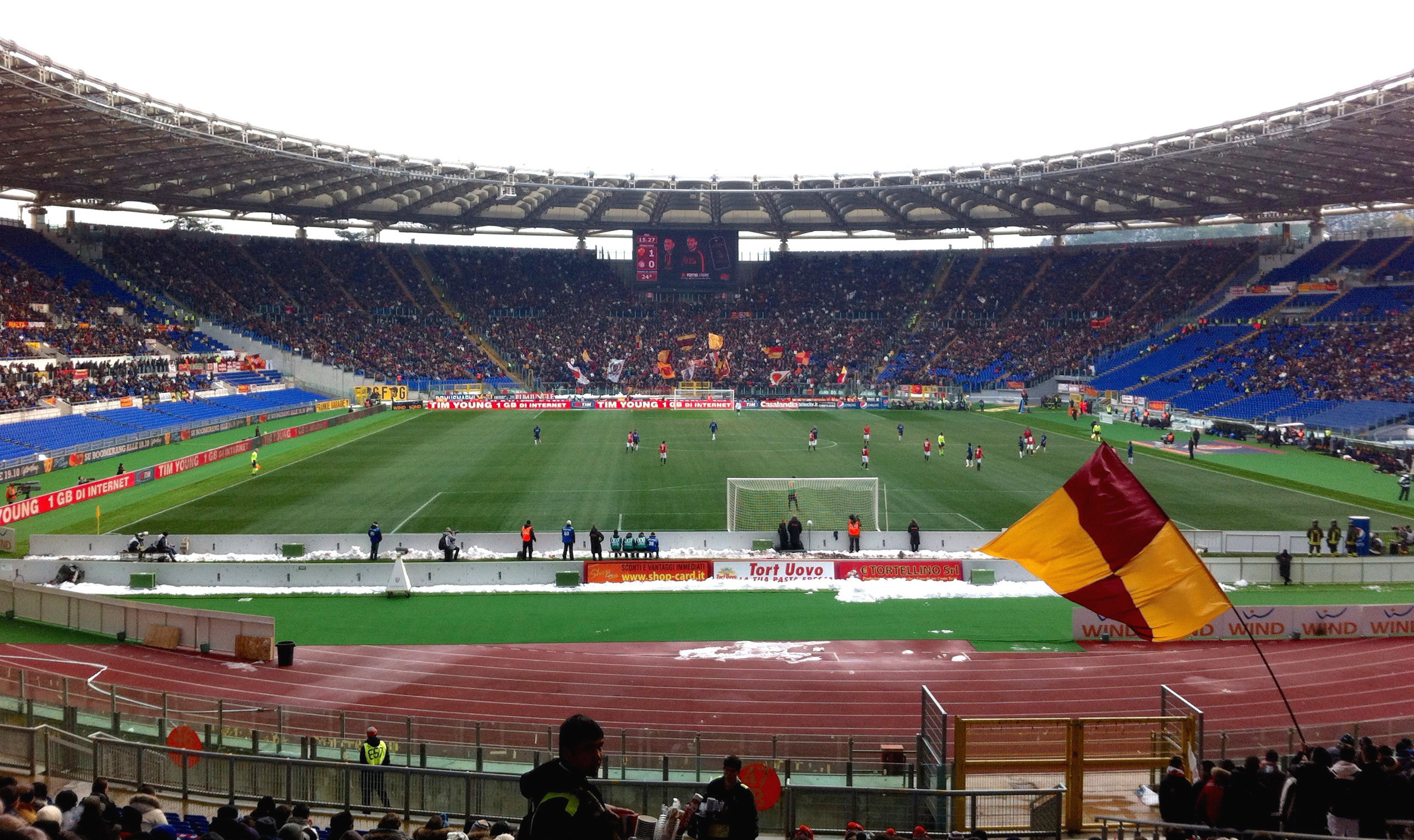
- The Stadio Olimpico in Rome hosted the final.
- Event: 2022–23 Coppa Italia
Fiorentina	Internazionale
1	2
- Date: 24 May 2023
- Venue: Stadio Olimpico, Rome
- Man of the Match: Lautaro Martínez (Internazionale)
- Referee: Massimiliano Irrati
- Attendance: 68,500

The 2023 Coppa Italia final was the final match of the 2022–23 Coppa Italia, Italy's premier national football cup, the Coppa Italia. It was played on 24 May 2023 between Fiorentina and Internazionale.

Inter won the match 2–1 for their second consecutive and ninth overall Coppa Italia title.

== Background ==
Fiorentina had previously played in ten Coppa Italia finals, winning on six occasions. Their last appearance was a 3–1 defeat to Napoli in 2014, and their last win was 2–1 on aggregate over Parma in 2001. Inter had won eight of their fourteen prior appearances, and went in as defending champions with a 4–2 extra time win over Juventus in 2022. The two teams had never met in the final.

In the 2022–23 Serie A season, the away side won both of the meetings between the two teams. Inter won 4–3 at Fiorentina's Stadio Artemio Franchi on 22 October 2022; Henrikh Mkhitaryan scored the winning goal in added time. On 1 April 2023, Giacomo Bonaventura scored the only goal of Fiorentina's win at the San Siro.

In reaching the final, both teams qualified for the 2023 Supercoppa Italiana.

== Road to the final ==
Note: In all results below, the score of the finalist is given first (H: home; A: away).

Fiorentina		Round	Internazionale
Opponent	Result	2022–23 Coppa Italia	Opponent	Result
Sampdoria (H)	1–0	Round of 16	Parma (H)	2–1 (a.e.t.)
Torino (H)	2–1	Quarter-finals	Atalanta (H)	1–0
Cremonese	2–0 (A), 0–0 (H); 2–0 agg.	Semi-finals	Juventus	1–1 (A), 1–0 (H); 2–1 agg.

== Match ==
=== Details ===
24 May 2023
21:00 CEST

Fiorentina	1–2	Internazionale
González 3'	Report	Martínez 29', 37'

Stadio Olimpico, Rome
Attendance: 68,500
Referee: Massimiliano Irrati

Fiorentina	Internazionale

GK	1	(Italy) Pietro Terracciano
RB	2	(Brazil) Dodô		(substituted off) 82'
CB	28	(Argentina) Lucas Martínez Quarta	(yellow card) 54'	(substituted off) 70'
CB	4	(Serbia) Nikola Milenković
LB	3	(Italy) Cristiano Biraghi (c)
CM	34	(Morocco) Sofyan Amrabat		(substituted off) 70'
CM	5	(Italy) Giacomo Bonaventura
RW	11	(France) Jonathan Ikoné		(substituted off) 60'
AM	10	(Italy) Gaetano Castrovilli		(substituted off) 60'
LW	22	(Argentina) Nicolás González	(yellow card) 90'
CF	9	(Brazil) Arthur Cabral
Substitutes:
GK	31	(Italy) Michele Cerofolini
GK	51	(Italy) Tommaso Vannucchi
DF	15	(Serbia) Aleksa Terzić		(substituted on) 82'
DF	16	(Italy) Luca Ranieri		(substituted on) 70'
DF	23	(Italy) Lorenzo Venuti
DF	98	(Brazil) Igor
MF	8	(Italy) Riccardo Saponara
MF	32	(Ghana) Alfred Duncan
MF	38	(Italy) Rolando Mandragora		(substituted on) 60'
MF	42	(Italy) Alessandro Bianco
MF	72	(Czech Republic) Antonín Barák
MF	77	(Croatia) Josip Brekalo
FW	7	(Serbia) Luka Jović		(substituted on) 70'
FW	33	(Italy) Riccardo Sottil		(substituted on) 60'
FW	99	(Ivory Coast) Christian Kouamé
Manager:
(Italy) Vincenzo Italiano

GK	1	(Slovenia) Samir Handanović (c)
CB	36	(Italy) Matteo Darmian
CB	15	(Italy) Francesco Acerbi
CB	95	(Italy) Alessandro Bastoni	(yellow card) 53'	(substituted off) 58'
DM	77	(Croatia) Marcelo Brozović
CM	23	(Italy) Nicolò Barella
CM	20	(Turkey) Hakan Çalhanoğlu		(substituted off) 83'
RW	2	(Netherlands) Denzel Dumfries
LW	32	(Italy) Federico Dimarco		(substituted off) 68'
CF	10	(Argentina) Lautaro Martínez		(substituted off) 83'
CF	9	(Bosnia and Herzegovina) Edin Džeko		(substituted off) 58'
Substitutes:
GK	21	(Italy) Alex Cordaz
GK	24	(Cameroon) André Onana
DF	6	(Netherlands) Stefan de Vrij		(substituted on) 58'
DF	8	(Germany) Robin Gosens		(substituted on) 68'
DF	12	(Italy) Raoul Bellanova
DF	33	(Italy) Danilo D'Ambrosio
DF	37	(Slovakia) Milan Škriniar
MF	5	(Italy) Roberto Gagliardini		(substituted on) 83'
MF	14	(Albania) Kristjan Asllani
MF	22	(Armenia) Henrikh Mkhitaryan
MF	43	(Nigeria) Ebenezer Akinsanmiro
MF	50	(Serbia) Aleksandar Stanković
FW	11	(Argentina) Joaquín Correa		(substituted on) 83'
FW	90	(Belgium) Romelu Lukaku		(substituted on) 58'
Manager:
(Italy) Simone Inzaghi

Man of the Match:
Lautaro Martínez (Internazionale)

Assistant referees:
Ciro Carbone
Alessandro Lo Cicero
Fourth official:
Michael Fabbri
Reserve assistant referee:
Sergio Ranghetti
Video assistant referee:
Paolo Silvio Mazzoleni
Assistant video assistant referee:
Valerio Marini

Match rules

- 90 minutes.
- 30 minutes of extra time if necessary.
- Penalty shoot-out if scores still level.
- Fifteen named substitutes.
- Maximum of five substitutions, with a sixth allowed in extra time. (Note: Each team was given only three opportunities to make substitutions, excluding substitutions made at half-time, before the start of extra time and at half-time in extra time.)

=== Statistics ===
Overall
Statistic	Fiorentina	Internazionale
Goals scored	1	2
Total shots	19	11
Shots on target	6	4
Saves	2	5
Ball possession	51%	49%
Corner kicks	8	4
Fouls committed	9	11
Offsides	1	6
Yellow cards	2	1
Red cards	0	0

== See also ==
- 2022–23 ACF Fiorentina season
- 2022–23 Inter Milan season
