= 2023 UEFA Europa Conference League final =

- Event: 2022–23 UEFA Europa Conference League
Fiorentina	West Ham United
(Italian Football Federation)	(The Football Association)
1	2
- Date: 7 June 2023
- Venue: Fortuna Arena, Prague
- Man of the Match: Jarrod Bowen (West Ham United)
- Referee: Carlos del Cerro Grande (Spain)
- Attendance: 17,363
- Weather: Cloudy night 19 °C (66 °F); 75% humidity

The 2023 UEFA Europa Conference League final was the final match of the 2022–23 UEFA Europa Conference League, the second season of Europe's tertiary club football tournament organised by UEFA. The match was played at the Fortuna Arena in Prague, Czech Republic, on 7 June 2023, between Italian club Fiorentina and English club West Ham United.

West Ham United won the match 2–1 for their first UEFA Europa Conference League title. As winners, they qualified for the group stage of the 2023–24 UEFA Europa League.

== Background ==
This was the first appearance in the final of the competition for both teams. However, both Fiorentina and West Ham United had won the Cup Winners' Cup in the 1960s; Fiorentina was its first winners back in 1960–61, while West Ham won the cup four seasons later. In addition, West Ham was one of the three winners of the 1999 UEFA Intertoto Cup. Both clubs were also aiming to end their decades-long trophy drought; Fiorentina were looking to win their first trophy since winning the Coppa Italia 22 years earlier, while West Ham's most recent major title came in the 1979–80 FA Cup, when they became the most recent non-top flight side to win the tournament.

This was Fiorentina's fifth European final, having won the Cup Winners' Cup in 1961 as well as losing the 1957 European Cup, the 1962 European Cup Winners' Cup, and the 1990 UEFA Cup finals. With this, they became the first team to reach the finals of all major UEFA club competitions. (Note: European Cup/Champions League, Cup Winners' Cup, UEFA Cup/Europa League, UEFA Europa Conference League.)

This was West Ham's third European final, having won the Cup Winners' Cup in 1965 as well as losing the 1976 European Cup Winners' Cup final. They were the English team with the longest European major trophy drought—58 years since their latest triumph. Their defender Emerson Palmieri was aiming to become the first player to win all three currently existing major European trophies, having won the 2018–19 UEFA Europa League and the 2020–21 UEFA Champions League with Chelsea.

== Venue ==
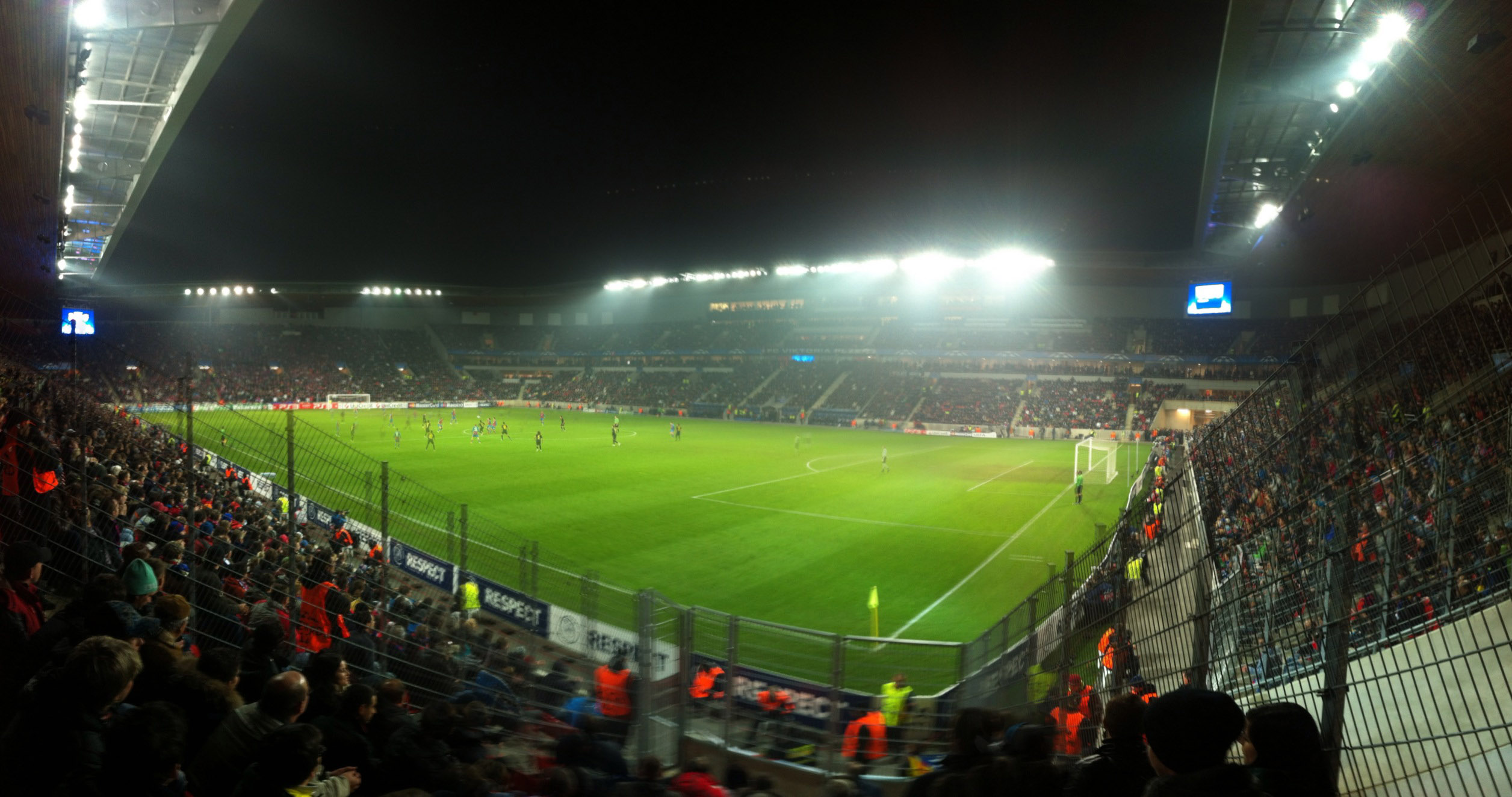
The Fortuna Arena in Prague hosted the final.

The Fortuna Arena previously hosted the 2013 UEFA Super Cup, as well as four matches at the 2015 UEFA European Under-21 Championship, including the final.

=== Host selection ===
A bidding process was launched by UEFA to select the venues of the finals of the UEFA Europa Conference League for both 2022 and 2023. Associations interested in hosting one of the finals had until 20 February 2020 to submit bid dossiers.

The decision was originally scheduled to be made by the UEFA Executive Committee during their meeting on 3 December 2020. However, UEFA later decided to reopen the bidding process after appointing the host for the 2022 final only. Member associations had until 30 September 2021 to confirm their intention to submit a bid, while the bids must be submitted by 23 February 2022. Six associations expressed interest in hosting the final.

New bidding associations for 2023 UEFA Europa Conference League Final
Association	Stadium	City	Capacity	Notes
Czech Republic	Fortuna Arena	Prague	20,800	
Greece	Agia Sophia Stadium	Athens	32,000	Under construction
Israel	Teddy Stadium	Jerusalem	31,733	
Northern Ireland	Windsor Park	Belfast	18,614	
Slovakia	Tehelné pole	Bratislava	22,500	

The UEFA Executive Committee appointed the Fortuna Arena as the host during their meeting in Vienna, Austria, on 10 May 2022.

== Route to the final ==
Note: In all results below, the score of the finalist is given first (H: home; A: away).

(Italian Football Federation) Fiorentina				Round	(The Football Association) West Ham United			
Opponent	Agg.	1st leg	2nd leg	Qualifying phase	Opponent	Agg.	1st leg	2nd leg
(Royal Dutch Football Association) Twente	2–1	2–1 (H)	0–0 (A)	Play-off round	(Danish Football Association) Viborg	6–1	3–1 (H)	3–0 (A)
Opponent	Result			Group stage	Opponent	Result		
(Latvian Football Federation) RFS	1–1 (H)			Matchday 1	(Romanian Football Federation) FCSB	3–1 (H)		
(Turkish Football Federation) İstanbul Başakşehir	0–3 (A)			Matchday 2	(Danish Football Association) Silkeborg	3–2 (A)		
(Scottish Football Association) Heart of Midlothian	3–0 (A)			Matchday 3	(Royal Belgian Football Association) Anderlecht	1–0 (A)		
(Scottish Football Association) Heart of Midlothian	5–1 (H)			Matchday 4	(Royal Belgian Football Association) Anderlecht	2–1 (H)		
(Turkish Football Federation) İstanbul Başakşehir	2–1 (H)			Matchday 5	(Danish Football Association) Silkeborg	1–0 (H)		
(Latvian Football Federation) RFS	3–0 (A)			Matchday 6	(Romanian Football Federation) FCSB	3–0 (A)		
Group A runners-up: Pos / Team / Pld / Pts; 1 / (Turkey) İstanbul Başakşehir / 6 / 13; 2 / (Italy) Fiorentina / 6 / 13; 3 / (Scotland) Heart of Midlothian / 6 / 6; 4 / (Latvia) RFS / 6 / 2; Source: UEFA				Final standings	Group B winners: Pos / Team / Pld / Pts; 1 / (England) West Ham United / 6 / 18; 2 / (Belgium) Anderlecht / 6 / 8; 3 / (Denmark) Silkeborg / 6 / 6; 4 / (Romania) FCSB / 6 / 2; Source: UEFA			
Opponent	Agg.	1st leg	2nd leg	Knockout phase	Opponent	Agg.	1st leg	2nd leg
(Portuguese Football Federation) Braga	7–2	4–0 (A)	3–2 (H)	Knockout round play-offs	Bye			
(Turkish Football Federation) Sivasspor	5–1	1–0 (H)	4–1 (A)	Round of 16	(Cyprus Football Association) AEK Larnaca	6–0	2–0 (A)	4–0 (H)
(Polish Football Association) Lech Poznań	6–4	4–1 (A)	2–3 (H)	Quarter-finals	(Royal Belgian Football Association) Gent	5–2	1–1 (A)	4–1 (H)
(Swiss Football Association) Basel	4–3	1–2 (H)	3–1 (a.e.t.) (A)	Semi-finals	(Royal Dutch Football Association) AZ	3–1	2–1 (H)	1–0 (A)

== Pre-match ==
=== Identity ===
The original identity of the 2023 UEFA Europa Conference League Final was unveiled at the group stage draw on 26 August 2022.

=== Ambassador ===
The ambassador for the final was former Czech international Vladimír Šmicer, who won the 2000–01 UEFA Cup and 2004–05 UEFA Champions League titles with Liverpool.

=== Ticketing ===
With a stadium capacity of 18,000 for the final, a total amount of 13,000 tickets were available to fans and the general public, with the two finalist teams receiving 5,000 tickets each, and with the other tickets being available for sale to fans worldwide via UEFA.com from 21 to 28 April 2023 in four price categories: €125, €85, €45, and €25. Accessibility tickets for disabled spectators cost €25. The remaining tickets were allocated to the local organising committee, national associations, commercial partners, and broadcasters, and to serve the corporate hospitality programme.

=== Violence ===
Police arrested more than 30 people after a group of West Ham fans were attacked by Italian Ultras dressed in black. The violence erupted in the morning of 7 June 2023 in the Old Town Square area of Prague. Police said the men were wearing face coverings and carrying chains and other weapons.

== Match ==
=== Summary ===
==== First half ====
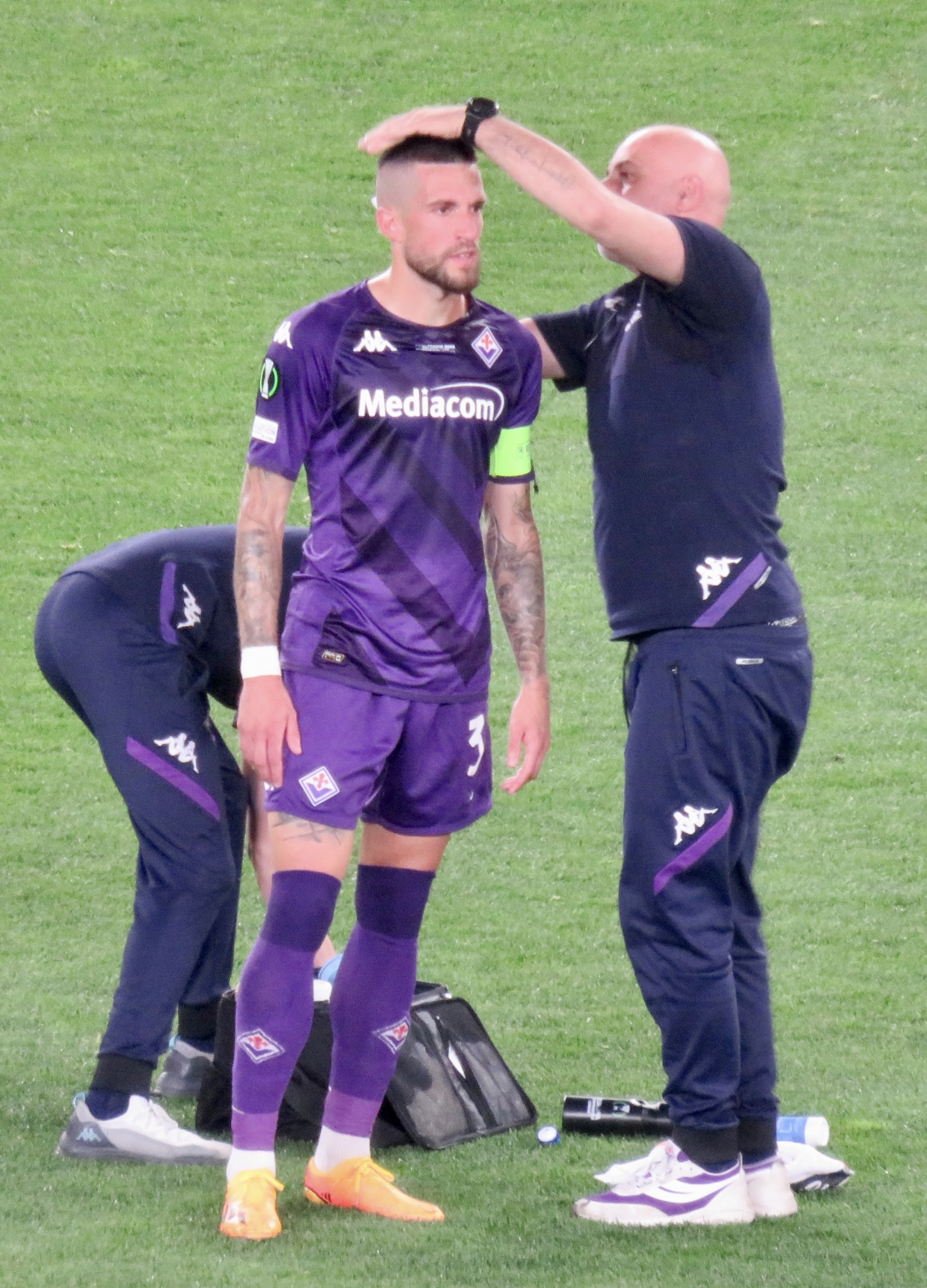
Biraghi being treated after being hit with object from the crowd

West Ham started quickly as Lucas Paquetá played a pass into Michail Antonio, but his shot was easily saved by Pietro Terracciano. Shortly after, Fiorentina's Rolando Mandragora unleashed a shot from distance that was well wide. Fiorentina caught a break after Declan Rice's shot was just wide of the post following a long throw that the Italians failed to clear. Fiorentina began to control the tempo from this point, and had a chance when Nikola Milenković's header went over the bar from a corner. Saïd Benrahma went down near the edge of the Fiorentina box, but instead of drawing a free kick for the Hammers, he received the first yellow card of the match for simulation.

Ten minutes before the halftime whistle, the match was halted when Fiorentina captain Cristiano Biraghi was hit by cups and other objects thrown by the West Ham fans. Biraghi was bleeding from the back of his head, but after receiving medical treatment he continued to play. Fiorentina won successive corners, but West Ham dealt with them and prevented Fiorentina from capitalizing. Tomáš Souček had a header in the box cleared by Luca Ranieri near the end of the half. Fiorentina had the best chance of the half right before the halftime whistle. Alphonse Areola pushed a header from Christian Kouamé onto the post, where it fell to Luka Jović, who got enough on his header from the rebound and Areola could not prevent it going over the line. However, Jović was in an offside position when Kouamé touched the ball, and the goal was quickly disallowed. Both teams went into halftime having created few chances, but Fiorentina had dominated possession, looked the better team, and very nearly secured the lead.

==== Second half ====
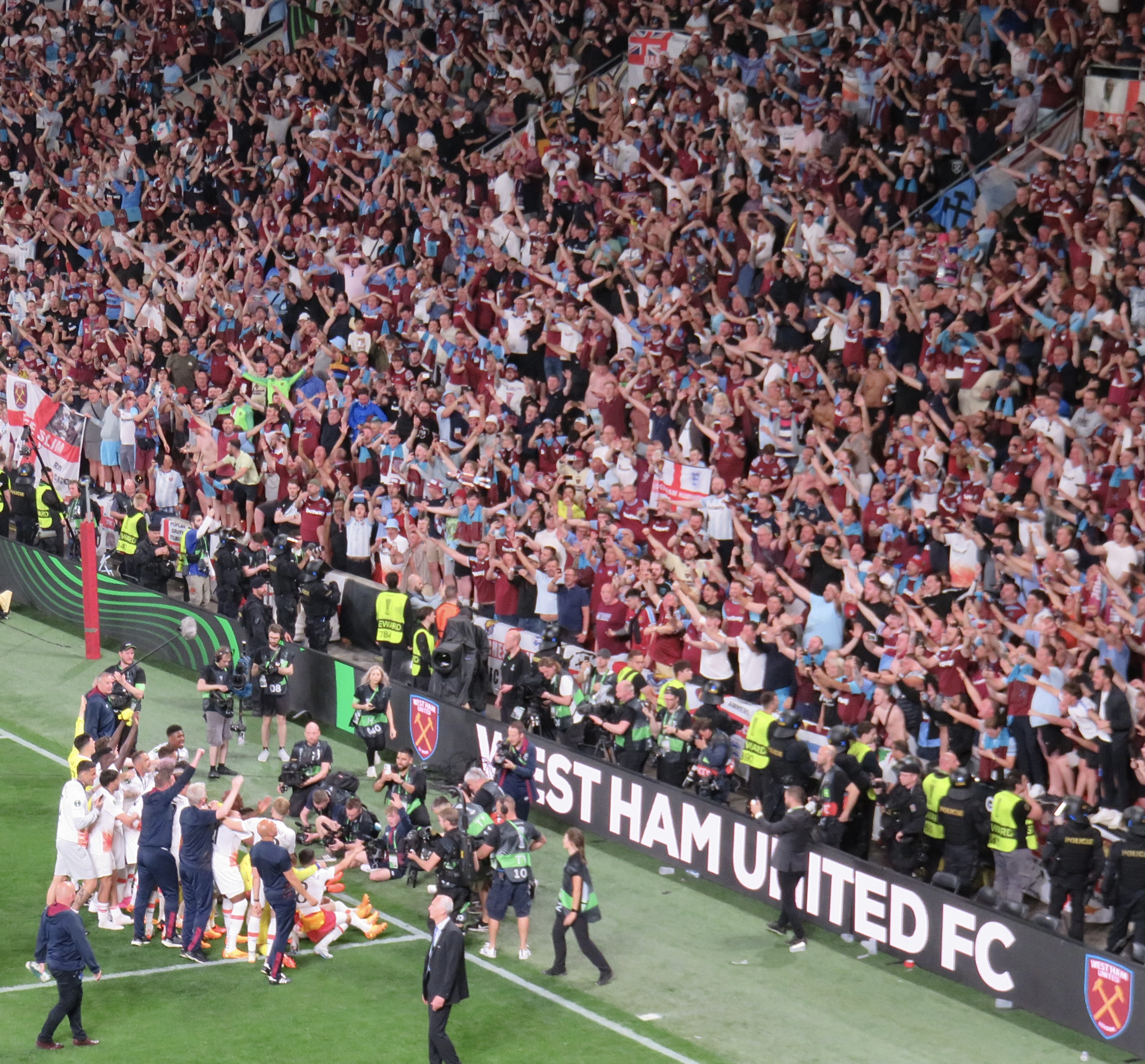
The players, staff and fans of West Ham United celebrate their win.

Fiorentina made the first substitution a minute into the second half, with Jovic leaving the pitch and being replaced by Arthur Cabral. Nayef Aguerd became the second player booked after a high challenge on Mandragora in the 53rd minute. The Italians got their first shot on target, but Areola easily claimed the shot from Kouamé. West Ham broke the game open in the 60th minute, when a long throw into the box was controlled by Jarrod Bowen before going out for a goal kick amid strong penalty appeals from Bowen and other West Ham players. After a VAR check by referee Carlos del Cerro Grande showed that Biraghi had flicked his hand on to the ball, the penalty was given to the Hammers. Benrahma's penalty into the top right corner sent Terracciano the wrong way, and gave West Ham a 1–0 lead. Both teams made changes shortly after; West Ham replaced Kurt Zouma with Thilo Kehrer, and Fiorentina's Kouamé was replaced by Riccardo Saponara.

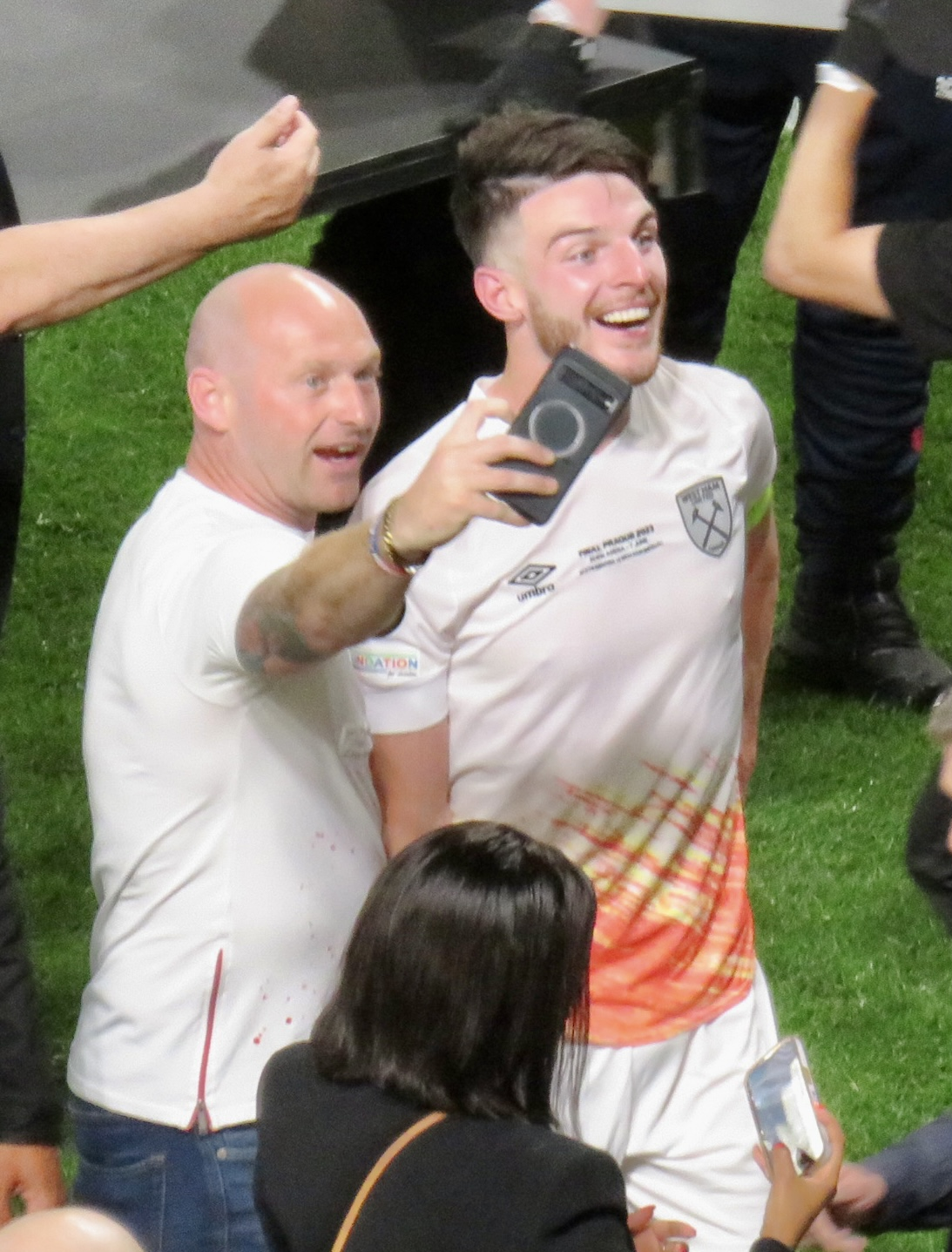
Declan Rice celebrates shortly after the end of the game

West Ham's lead was short lived. Nicolás González won an aerial duel against Emerson, and headed the ball down for Giacomo Bonaventura who controlled it well with one foot and fired past Areola with the other into the far corner to equalise for Fiorentina. West Ham nearly responded to retake the lead, as Antonio was slipped in by Paquetá, but could not finish the chance, and the flag went up for offside. Benrahma was subbed off for Pablo Fornals shortly after. Milenkovic was booked after bringing down Paqueta, joining Mandragora as a cautioned Fiorentina player. Ranieri was replaced by Igor Julio in the 80th minute. West Ham had another chance that was ruled offside, this time it was Soucek who failed to beat Terracciano. Sofyan Amrabat received a yellow card for his tackle on Emerson in the 85th minute. Amrabat had a chance from a West Ham turnover, but he failed to beat Areola. In the 90th minute of the game, with stoppage time imminent, Paquetá intercepted a ball in midfield, and played a through ball to Bowen who had only Terracciano in the Fiorentina goal to beat. Bowen lifted the ball over the leg of Terracciano and although the goalkeeper got a slight touch to the ball, the shot went into the net, reclaiming the lead for West Ham in the final moments of normal time. This was enough to give the Hammers a 2–1 victory and their first UEFA Europa Conference League title.

=== Details ===
The "home" team (for administrative purposes) was determined by an additional draw held after the quarter-final and semi-final draws.

7 June 2023
21:00 UTC+2

Fiorentina (Italian Football Federation)	1–2	(The Football Association) West Ham United
Bonaventura 67'	Report	Benrahma 62' (pen.); Bowen 90'

Fortuna Arena, Prague
Attendance: 17,363
Referee: Carlos del Cerro Grande (Spain)

Fiorentina	West Ham United

GK	1	(Italy) Pietro Terracciano
RB	2	(Brazil) Dodô
CB	4	(Serbia) Nikola Milenković	(yellow card) 75'
CB	16	(Italy) Luca Ranieri		(substituted off) 84'
LB	3	(Italy) Cristiano Biraghi (c)
CM	34	(Morocco) Sofyan Amrabat	(yellow card) 85'
CM	38	(Italy) Rolando Mandragora	(yellow card) 66'	(substituted off) 90+3'
AM	5	(Italy) Giacomo Bonaventura
RW	22	(Argentina) Nicolás González
LW	99	(Ivory Coast) Christian Kouamé		(substituted off) 61'
CF	7	(Serbia) Luka Jović		(substituted off) 46'
Substitutes:
GK	31	(Italy) Michele Cerofolini
DF	15	(Serbia) Aleksa Terzić
DF	23	(Italy) Lorenzo Venuti
DF	28	(Argentina) Lucas Martínez Quarta
DF	98	(Brazil) Igor		(substituted on) 84'
MF	8	(Italy) Riccardo Saponara		(substituted on) 61'
MF	32	(Ghana) Alfred Duncan	(yellow card) 67'
MF	42	(Italy) Alessandro Bianco
MF	72	(Czech Republic) Antonín Barák		(substituted on) 90+3'
FW	9	(Brazil) Arthur Cabral		(substituted on) 46'
FW	11	(France) Jonathan Ikoné
FW	77	(Croatia) Josip Brekalo
Manager:
(Italy) Vincenzo Italiano

GK	13	(France) Alphonse Areola
RB	5	(Czech Republic) Vladimír Coufal
CB	4	(France) Kurt Zouma		(substituted off) 61'
CB	27	(Morocco) Nayef Aguerd	(yellow card) 53'
LB	33	(Italy) Emerson Palmieri
CM	28	(Czech Republic) Tomáš Souček
CM	41	(England) Declan Rice (c)
AM	11	(Brazil) Lucas Paquetá
RW	20	(England) Jarrod Bowen	(yellow card) 90+7'
LW	22	(Algeria) Saïd Benrahma	(yellow card) 31'	(substituted off) 76'
CF	9	(Jamaica) Michail Antonio		(substituted off) 90+4'
Substitutes:
GK	1	(Poland) Łukasz Fabiański
DF	2	(England) Ben Johnson
DF	3	(England) Aaron Cresswell	(yellow card) 90+1'
DF	21	(Italy) Angelo Ogbonna		(substituted on) 90+4'
DF	24	(Germany) Thilo Kehrer		(substituted on) 61'
MF	8	(Spain) Pablo Fornals		(substituted on) 76'
MF	10	(Argentina) Manuel Lanzini
MF	12	(England) Flynn Downes
MF	62	(England) Freddie Potts
FW	14	(Ivory Coast) Maxwel Cornet
FW	18	(England) Danny Ings
FW	72	(England) Divin Mubama
Manager:
(Scotland) David Moyes

Man of the Match:
Jarrod Bowen (West Ham United)

Assistant referees:
Pau Cebrián Devís (Spain)
Guadalupe Porras Ayuso (Spain)
Fourth official:
Jesús Gil Manzano (Spain)
Reserve assistant referee:
Diego Barbero Sevilla (Spain)
Video assistant referee:
Juan Martínez Munuera (Spain)
Assistant video assistant referee:
Alejandro Hernández Hernández (Spain)
Support video assistant referee:
Tiago Martins (Portugal)

Match rules

- 90 minutes
- 30 minutes of extra time if necessary
- Penalty shoot-out if scores still level
- Twelve named substitutes
- Maximum of five substitutions, with a sixth allowed in extra time (Note: Each team was given only three opportunities to make substitutions, with a fourth opportunity in extra time, excluding substitutions made at half-time, before the start of extra time and at half-time in extra time.)

=== Statistics ===
First half
Statistic	Fiorentina	West Ham United
Goals scored	0	0
Total shots	7	3
Shots on target	0	1
Saves	1	0
Ball possession	66%	34%
Corner kicks	3	2
Fouls committed	5	7
Offsides	1	1
Yellow cards	0	1
Red cards	0	0

Second half
Statistic	Fiorentina	West Ham United
Goals scored	1	2
Total shots	10	5
Shots on target	4	3
Saves	1	3
Ball possession	61%	39%
Corner kicks	0	2
Fouls committed	10	9
Offsides	1	2
Yellow cards	4	3
Red cards	0	0

Overall
Statistic	Fiorentina	West Ham United
Goals scored	1	2
Total shots	17	8
Shots on target	4	4
Saves	2	3
Ball possession	63%	37%
Corner kicks	3	4
Fouls committed	15	16
Offsides	2	3
Yellow cards	4	4
Red cards	0	0

== Post-match ==
After the game Fiorentina president Rocco Commisso described West Ham as treating Fiorentina players "like animals" after Luka Jović came off at half-time with a broken nose and Cristiano Biraghi received a bloodied face after being hit by an object thrown from the crowd. UEFA later charged both clubs with "throwing of objects" with West Ham being charged with "invasion of the field of play" and Fiorentina being charged with the "lighting of fireworks". West Ham supporters were banned from attending the club's first away fixture of their 2023–24 UEFA Europa League campaign. The club was also fined €50,000 after supporters threw objects onto the pitch and a further €8,000 for a pitch invasion following the game. Fiorentina were given a one-match ban for away supporters and were fined €30,000.

On 8 June, thousands lined a route from the Champions Statue to Stratford Town Hall as West Ham players took part in an open top bus parade to show the trophy and celebrate the win.

== See also ==
- 2023 UEFA Champions League final
- 2023 UEFA Europa League final
- 2023 UEFA Women's Champions League final
- 2023 UEFA Super Cup
- ACF Fiorentina in European football
- West Ham United F.C. in European football
- 2022–23 ACF Fiorentina season
- 2022–23 West Ham United F.C. season
