= 2022–23 ACF Fiorentina season =

Fiorentina
2022–23 season
- Owner: Mediacom
- Chairman: Rocco B. Commisso
- Head coach: Vincenzo Italiano
- Stadium: Stadio Artemio Franchi
- Serie A: 8th
- Coppa Italia: Runners-up
- UEFA Europa Conference League: Runners-up
- Top goalscorer: League: Arthur Cabral (8); All: Arthur Cabral (17)
Home colours	Away colours	Third colours

The 2022–23 season was the 96th season in the history of ACF Fiorentina and their 19th consecutive season in the top flight. The club participated in Serie A, the Coppa Italia, and the UEFA Europa Conference League, finishing as runners-up in the latter two competitions.

== Players ==
As of 14 August 2022

No.	Player	Nat.	Position(s)	Date of birth (age)	Signed from	Signed in	Contract ends	Apps.	Goals	Notes
Goalkeepers
1	Pietro Terracciano	(Italy)	GK	8 March 1990 (aged 33)	(Italy) Empoli	2019	2023	45	0	
31	Michele Cerofolini	(Italy)	GK	4 January 1999 (aged 24)	(Italy) Youth Sector	2017	2023	0	0	
95	Pierluigi Gollini	(Italy)	GK	18 March 1995 (aged 28)	(Italy) Atalanta	2022	2023	2	0	On loan
Defenders
2	Dodô	(Brazil)	RB	17 November 1998 (aged 24)	(Ukraine) Shakhtar Donetsk	2022	2027	3	0	
3	Cristiano Biraghi	(Italy)	LB	1 September 1992 (aged 30)	(Italy) Pescara	2017	2024	145	7	
4	Nikola Milenković	(Serbia)	CB / RB	12 October 1997 (aged 25)	(Serbia) Partizan	2017	2025	158	12	
15	Aleksa Terzić	(Serbia)	LB	17 August 1999 (aged 23)	(Serbia) Red Star Belgrade	2019	2024	18	0	
16	Luca Ranieri	(Italy)	CB / LB / LM	23 April 1999 (aged 24)	(Italy) Youth Sector	2015	2024	3	0	
23	Lorenzo Venuti	(Italy)	RB	12 April 1995 (aged 28)	(Italy) Youth Sector	2019	2024	67	0	
28	Lucas Martínez Quarta	(Argentina)	CB	10 May 1996 (aged 27)	(Argentina) River Plate	2020	2025	44	2	
55	Matija Nastasić	(Serbia)	CB / LB	28 March 1993 (aged 30)	(Germany) Schalke 04	2021	2023	31	2	
98	Igor	(Brazil)	CB / LB / LM	7 February 1998 (aged 25)	(Italy) SPAL	2021	2024	61	0	
	Gabriele Ferrarini	(Italy)	LB / RB / RM	9 April 2000 (aged 23)	(Italy) Youth Sector	2017	2023	0	0	
Midfielders
5	Giacomo Bonaventura	(Italy)	CM / AM / LW	22 August 1989 (aged 33)	(Italy) Milan	2020	2023	68	8	
8	Riccardo Saponara	(Italy)	AM	21 December 1991 (aged 31)	(Italy) Empoli	2018	2023	63	5	
10	Gaetano Castrovilli	(Italy)	CM	17 February 1997 (aged 26)	(Italy) Bari	2017	2024	90	9	
14	Youssef Maleh	(Italy)	CM	28 August 1998 (aged 24)	(Italy) Venezia	2021	2025	31	2	
24	Marco Benassi	(Italy)	CM / AM	8 September 1994 (aged 28)	(Italy) Torino	2017	2024	92	13	
27	Szymon Żurkowski	(Poland)	CM / DM / AM	25 September 1997 (aged 25)	(Poland) Górnik Zabrze	2019	2024	3	0	
32	Alfred Duncan	(Ghana)	CM / DM	10 March 1993 (aged 30)	(Italy) Sassuolo	2020	2024	51	3	
34	Sofyan Amrabat	(Morocco)	CM / DM	21 August 1996 (aged 26)	(Italy) Hellas Verona	2020	2024	56	1	
38	Rolando Mandragora	(Italy)	CM / DM	29 June 1997 (aged 26)	(Italy) Juventus	2022	2026	2	1	
42	Alessandro Bianco	(Italy)	CM	1 October 2002 (aged 20)	(Italy) Chisola	2022	2023	0	0	
72	Antonín Barák	(Czech Republic)	CM	3 December 1994 (aged 28)	(Italy) Hellas Verona	2022	2023	1	0	On Loan
Forwards
7	Luka Jović	(Serbia)	CF	23 December 1997 (aged 25)	(Spain) Real Madrid	2022	2024	3	1	
9	Arthur Cabral	(Brazil)	CF	25 April 1998 (aged 25)	(Switzerland) Basel	2022	2026	15	2	
11	Jonathan Ikoné	(France)	RW	2 May 1998 (aged 25)	(France) Lille	2022	2026	19	1	
22	Nicolás González	(Argentina)	LW / RW / CF	6 April 1998 (aged 25)	(Germany) VfB Stuttgart	2021	2026	35	7	
33	Riccardo Sottil	(Italy)	LW / RW / CF	3 June 1999 (aged 24)	(Italy) Youth Sector	2018	2026	47	3	
99	Christian Kouamé	(Ivory Coast)	CF	6 December 1997 (aged 25)	(Italy) Genoa	2020	2024	42	2	

== Transfers ==
=== In ===
Date	Pos.	Player	Age	Moving from	Fee	Notes
4 July 2022	MF	(Italy) Rolando Mandragora	25	(Italy) Juventus	€8.2M	
8 July 2022	FW	(Serbia) Luka Jović	24	(Spain) Real Madrid	Free	
22 July 2022	DF	(Brazil) Dodô	23	(Ukraine) Shakhtar Donetsk	€14.5M	

==== Loans in ====
Date	Pos.	Player	Age	Moving from	Fee	Notes
9 July 2022	GK	(Italy) Pierluigi Gollini	27	(Italy) Atalanta	€0.5M	
26 August 2022	MF	(Czech Republic) Antonín Barák	27	(Italy) Hellas Verona	€2M	

=== Out ===
Date	Pos.	Player	Age	Moving to	Fee	Notes
1 July 2022	GK	(Italy) Federico Brancolini	20	(Italy) Lecce	Free	
1 July 2022	FW	(Spain) José Callejón	35	(Spain) Granada	Free	
1 July 2022	DF	(Italy) Andrea Poggesi	20	(Italy) Arezzo	Free	
1 July 2022	FW	(Italy) Federico Chiesa	24	(Italy) Juventus	€40M	
15 July 2022	MF	(Spain) Tòfol Montiel	22	Free agent		
16 July 2022	DF	(Italy) Daniele Ghilardi	19	(Italy) Hellas Verona	€0.5M	
20 July 2022	GK	(Italy) Simone Ghidotti	22	(Italy) Como	Undisclosed	
20 July 2022	MF	(Italy) Alessandro Lovisa	20	(Italy) Triestina	Undisclosed	
29 July 2022	MF	(Chile) Erick Pulgar	28	(Brazil) Flamengo	€2.5M	
10 August 2022	GK	(Poland) Bartłomiej Drągowski	24	(Italy) Spezia	€3M	
15 August 2022	GK	(Italy) Antonio Rosati	39	Retired	N/A	

==== Loans out ====
Date	Pos.	Player	Age	Moving to	Fee	Notes
30 June 2022	DF	(Italy) Christian Dalle Mura	20	(Italy) SPAL		
13 July 2022	FW	(Italy) Samuele Spalluto	21	(Italy) Ternana		
21 July 2022	DF	(Romania) Eduard Duțu	21	(Italy) Reggina		
21 July 2022	MF	(Italy) Niccolò Pierozzi	20	(Italy) Reggina		
22 July 2022	MF	(Italy) Vittorio Agostinelli	20	(Italy) Reggina		
29 July 2022	DF	(Italy) Edoardo Pierozzi	20	(Italy) Palermo		
30 July 2022	DF	(Denmark) Jacob Rasmussen	25	(Netherlands) Feyenoord		
3 August 2022	FW	(Italy) Gabriele Gori	23	(Italy) Reggina		
31 August 2022	FW	(Russia) Aleksandr Kokorin	31	(Cyprus) Aris Limassol		

== Pre-season and friendlies ==
Win Draw Loss Fixtures

12 July 2022 Friendly	Fiorentina (Italy)	7–0	(Italy) Real Vicenza	Moena, Italy
17:00 CEST (UTC+2)	González 40'; Pierozzi 42'; Jović 56' (pen.), 68', 79', 84'; Ikoné 58'	Report		Stadium: Campo Sportivo Cesare Benatti; Attendance: 1,500

22 July 2022 Friendly	Fiorentina (Italy)	4–1	(Italy) Trento	Moena, Italy
17:00 CEST (UTC+2)	Żurkowski 3'; Sottil 29', 57'; Jović 81'	Report	Belcastro 58'	Stadium: Campo Sportivo Cesare Benatti

23 July 2022 Friendly	Fiorentina (Italy)	4–0	(Italy) Triestina	Moena, Italy
17:00 CEST (UTC+2)	Biraghi 6'; Amrabat 9' (pen.); Saponara 13'; Bonaventura 43' (pen.)	Report		Stadium: Campo Sportivo Cesare Benatti

31 July 2022 Friendly	Fiorentina (Italy)	1–2	(Turkey) Galatasaray	Grödig, Austria
19:00 CEST (UTC+2)	Cabral (yellow card) 49'; González (yellow card) 69'; Sottil 72'; Dodô (yellow card) 89'	Report	Aktürkoğlu 5'; Muslera (yellow card) 37'; Oliveira (yellow card) 41'; Akbaba 42'; Elabdellaoui (yellow card) 46'; Kutlu (yellow card) 69'	Stadium: Untersberg-Arena

3 August 2022 Friendly	Qatar	0–0	(Italy) Fiorentina	Grödig, Austria
18:00 CEST (UTC+2)		Report		Stadium: Untersberg-Arena

6 August 2022 Friendly	Real Betis (Spain)	3–1	(Italy) Fiorentina	Seville, Spain
21:00 CEST (UTC+2)	Juanmi 29'; Iglesias 34'; Rodríguez (yellow card) 43'; Bartra (yellow card) 60'; Miranda 74'; Guardado (yellow card) 79'; Pezzella (yellow card) 81'	Report	Jović 61'; Venuti (yellow card) 80'	Stadium: Benito Villamarín; Attendance: 20,000; Referee: Jorge Figueroa Vázquez

1 December 2022 Friendly	Arezzo (Italy)	1–4	(Italy) Fiorentina	Arezzo, Italy
15:00 CET (UTC+1)	Dema (yellow card) 34'; Convitto 78'	Report	Benassi 6', 38', 42'; Amatucci (yellow card) 78'; Ikoné 90+3'	Stadium: Stadio Città di Arezzo

7 December 2022 Friendly	Fiorentina (Italy)	9–0	(Bolivia) Always Ready	Florence, Italy
18:00 CET (UTC+1)	Ikoné 11', 31', 40'; Bianco 20'; Saponara 24'; Biraghi 48'; Mandragora 71'; Benassi 76'; Kouamé 80'	Report		Stadium: Stadio Artemio Franchi

10 December 2022 Christmas Cup	Borussia Dortmund (Germany)	0–2	(Italy) Fiorentina	Bucharest, Romania
13:30 CET (UTC+1)	Papadopoulos (yellow card) (yellow-red card) 58'	Report	Mandragora 35'; Bonaventura 39'	Stadium: Arena Națională; Referee: Andrei Moroiţă (Romania)
Note: Match was played in two 30-minute halves.

10 December 2022 Christmas Cup	Rapid București (Romania)	0–3	(Italy) Fiorentina	Bucharest, Romania
15:00 CET (UTC+1)	Emmers (yellow card) 55'	Report	Kouamé 30'; Ranieri (yellow card) 51'; Benassi 56', 75'; Amatucci (yellow card) 60'	Stadium: Arena Națională; Referee: Ovidiu Robu (Romania)
Note: Match was played in two 30-minute halves.

14 December 2022 Friendly	Bastia (France)	1–2	(Italy) Fiorentina	Furiani, France
17:30 CET (UTC+1)	Kaïboué (yellow card) 37'; Santelli 88'	Report	Mandragora (yellow card) 40'; Ranieri (yellow card) 44'; Igor 59'; Barák 66'	Stadium: Stade Armand-Cesari

30 December 2022 Friendly	Fiorentina (Italy)	v	(Italy) Fiorentina Primavera	Florence, Italy
12:00 CET (UTC+1)				Stadium: Stadio Artemio Franchi

== Competitions ==
=== Overall record ===
Competition	First match	Last match	Starting round	Final position	Record							
Competition	First match	Last match	Starting round	Final position	Pld	W	D	L	GF	GA	GD	Win %
Serie A	14 August 2022	2 June 2023	Matchday 1	8th	38	15	11	12	53	43	+10	39.47
Coppa Italia	12 January 2023	24 May 2023	Round of 16	Runners-up	5	3	1	1	6	3	+3	60.00
UEFA Europa Conference League	18 August 2022	7 June 2023	Play-off round	Runners-up	17	11	2	4	39	19	+20	64.71
Total					60	29	14	17	98	65	+33	48.33

Source: Soccerway

=== Serie A ===
==== League table ====
Pos	Team	Pld	W	D	L	GF	GA	GD	Pts	Qualification or relegation
6	Roma	38	18	9	11	50	38	+12	63	Qualification for the Europa League group stage (Note: Since the winners of the 2022–23 Coppa Italia, Inter Milan, qualified for the Champions League, the Europa League berth awarded to the Coppa Italia winners was passed to the sixth-placed team, and the Europa Conference League berth awarded to the sixth-placed team was passed to the seventh-placed team.)
7	Juventus (Note: Juventus were excluded from UEFA competitions due to violation of UEFA's financial regulations.)	38	22	6	10	56	33	+23	62 (Note: Juventus were deducted 10 points as punishment for capital gain violations.)	
8	Fiorentina	38	15	11	12	53	43	+10	56	Qualification for the Εuropa Conference League play-off round
9	Bologna	38	14	12	12	53	49	+4	54	
10	Torino	38	14	11	13	42	41	+1	53	

Source: Serie A
Rules for classification: 1) Points; 2) Tiebreaker for Champions team and third relegated team; 3) Head-to-head points; 4) Head-to-head goal difference; 5) Goal difference; 6) Goals scored; 7) Draw. (Note: Head-to-head record is used only after all the matches between the teams in question have been played)

==== Results summary ====
Overall								Home						Away					
Pld	W	D	L	GF	GA	GD	Pts	W	D	L	GF	GA	GD	W	D	L	GF	GA	GD
38	15	11	12	53	43	+10	56	9	6	4	30	22	+8	6	5	8	23	21	+2

Source: Serie A

==== Results by round ====
Round	1	2	3	4	5	6	7	8	9	10	11	12	13	14	15	16	17	18	19	20	21	22	23	24	25	26	27	28	29	30	31	32	33	34	35	36	37	38
Ground	H	A	H	A	H	A	H	A	H	A	H	A	A	H	A	H	H	A	H	A	H	A	H	A	H	A	H	A	H	H	A	H	A	A	H	A	H	A
Result	W	D	D	L	D	L	W	L	L	D	L	W	W	W	L	D	W	L	L	D	L	L	D	W	W	W	W	W	D	D	L	W	D	L	W	D	W	W
Position	5	7	9	11	11	11	10	11	13	13	14	13	11	10	10	10	9	10	11	12	13	14	14	12	12	11	9	9	9	9	10	9	8	8	8	11	9	8

Source: Serie A
A = Away; H = Home; W = Win; D = Draw; L = Loss

==== Matches ====
The league fixtures were announced on 24 June 2022.

14 August 2022 1	Fiorentina	3–2	Cremonese	Florence
18:30 CEST (UTC+2)	Bonaventura 16'; Jović 34'; Mandragora 90+5'	Report	Chiricheș (yellow card) 9'; Okereke 19', (yellow card) 82'; Escalante (red card) 44'; Ghiglione (yellow card) 62'; Bianchetti 68'	Stadium: Stadio Artemio Franchi; Attendance: 34,461; Referee: Juan Luca Sacchi

21 August 2022 2	Empoli	0–0	Fiorentina	Empoli
18:30 CEST (UTC+2)	Bandinelli (yellow card) 31'; Luperto (red card) 66'	Report	Ikoné (yellow card) 37'; Maleh (yellow card) 39'; Sottil (yellow card) 73'	Stadium: Stadio Carlo Castellani; Attendance: 10,500; Referee: Matteo Marchetti

28 August 2022 3	Fiorentina	0–0	Napoli	Florence
20:45 CEST (UTC+2)	Martínez Quarta (yellow card) 60'; Jović (yellow card) 68'	Report	Zambo Anguissa (yellow card) 3'; Raspadori (yellow card) 90'; Ndombele (yellow card) 90+3'	Stadium: Stadio Artemio Franchi; Attendance: 32,000; Referee: Livio Marinelli

31 August 2022 4	Udinese	1–0	Fiorentina	Udine
18:30 CEST (UTC+2)	Beto 17'; Udogie (yellow card) 90+2'	Report	Cabral (yellow card) 47'; Igor (yellow card) 89'	Stadium: Stadio Friuli; Attendance: 19,684; Referee: Maurizio Mariani

3 September 2022 5	Fiorentina	1–1	Juventus	Florence
15:00 CEST (UTC+2)	Amrabat (yellow card) 15'; Kouamé 29'; Jović (penalty missed) 44'	Report	Milik 9'; Alex Sandro (yellow card) 33'; Locatelli (yellow card) 52'; Danilo (yellow card) 53'	Stadium: Stadio Artemio Franchi; Attendance: 36,550; Referee: Daniele Doveri

11 September 2022 6	Bologna	2–1	Fiorentina	Bologna
15:00 CEST (UTC+2)	Barrow 59'; Arnautović 62'; Lykogiannis (yellow card) 87'	Report	Kouamé (yellow card) 46'; Amrabat (yellow card) 50'; Martínez Quarta 54'; Igor (yellow card) 90+1' (yellow-red card) 90+7'	Stadium: Stadio Renato Dall'Ara; Attendance: 18,901; Referee: Daniele Orsato

18 September 2022 7	Fiorentina	2–0	Hellas Verona	Florence
15:00 CEST (UTC+2)	Ikoné 13'; Mandragora (yellow card) 23'; Biraghi (penalty missed) 26'; Amrabat (yellow card) 32'; Bonaventura (yellow card) 58'; Barák (yellow card) 74'; González 90'	Report	Coppola (yellow card) 25'; Henry (yellow card) 34'; Hien (yellow card) 46'; Günter (yellow card) 76'	Stadium: Stadio Artemio Franchi; Attendance: 32,216; Referee: Antonio Rapuano

2 October 2022 8	Atalanta	1–0	Fiorentina	Bergamo
18:00 CEST (UTC+2)	Scalvini (yellow card) 31'; Lookman 59'; Hateboer (yellow card) 80'	Report	Bonaventura (yellow card) 5'; Amrabat (yellow card) 85'	Stadium: Gewiss Stadium; Attendance: 18,265; Referee: Massimiliano Irrati

10 October 2022 9	Fiorentina	0–4	Lazio	Florence
20:45 CEST (UTC+2)	Amrabat (yellow card) 24'; Igor (yellow card) 27'; Mandragora (yellow card) 68'; Dodô (yellow card) 70'	Report	Vecino 11'; Zaccagni 25'; Lazzari (yellow card) 78'; Luis Alberto 85'; Immobile 90+1'	Stadium: Stadio Artemio Franchi; Attendance: 30,574; Referee: Fabio Maresca

17 October 2022 10	Lecce	1–1	Fiorentina	Lecce
20:45 CEST (UTC+2)	Blin (yellow card) 40'; Ceesay 42'; Strefezza (yellow card) 58'; Umtiti (yellow card) 60'; Gallo (yellow card) 90+3' (yellow-red card) 90+5'	Report	Mandragora (yellow card) 15'; Kouamé (yellow card) 27', (goal) 48'; Terracciano (yellow card) 50'; Martínez Quarta (yellow card) 88'	Stadium: Stadio Via del mare Attendance: 24,925; Referee: Luca Massimi

22 October 2022 11	Fiorentina	3–4	Internazionale	Florence
20:45 CEST (UTC+2)	Cabral 33' (pen.); Bonaventura (yellow card) 36'; Dodô (yellow card) 38'; Amrabat (yellow card) 54'; Ikoné 60'; Milenković (yellow card) 79'; Jović 90'	Report	Barella 2', (yellow card) 56'; Martínez 15', 73' (pen.); Acerbi (yellow card) 36'; Dumfries (yellow card) 88'; Mkhitaryan 90+5'	Stadium: Stadio Artemio Franchi; Attendance: 36,699; Referee: Paolo Valeri

30 October 2022 12	Spezia	1–2	Fiorentina	La Spezia
15:00 CET (UTC+1)	Nikolaou (yellow card) 7', (red card) 82'; Gyasi (yellow card) 24'; Nzola 35', (yellow card) 90+3'; Ekdal (yellow card) 61'; Amian (yellow card) 69'	Report	Milenković 14'; Ikoné (yellow card) 20'; Amrabat (yellow card) 21'; Cabral 90'; Maleh (yellow card) 90+5'	Stadium: Stadio Alberto Picco; Attendance: 10,500; Referee: Davide Massa

6 November 2022 13	Sampdoria	0–2	Fiorentina	Genoa
15:00 CET (UTC+1)	Léris (yellow card) 25'	Report	Bonaventura 4'; Milenković 58'	Stadium: Stadio Luigi Ferraris; Attendance: 19,226; Referee: Livio Marinelli

9 November 2022 14	Fiorentina	2–1	Salernitana	Florence
18:30 CET (UTC+1)	Bonaventura 15'; Jović 81'	Report	Dia 55'; Radovanović (yellow card) 90+4'	Stadium: Stadio Artemio Franchi; Attendance: 27,329; Referee: Federico La Penna

13 November 2022 15	Milan	2–1	Fiorentina	Milan
18:00 CET (UTC+1)	Leão 2'; Brahim (yellow card) 21'; Milenković 90+2' (o.g.)	Report	Barák 28', (yellow card) 49'; Mandragora (yellow card) 63'; Jović (yellow card) 74'	Stadium: San Siro; Attendance: 73,007; Referee: Simone Sozza

4 January 2023 16	Fiorentina	1–1	Monza	Florence
14:30 CET (UTC+1)	Cabral 19'; Igor (yellow card) 57'	Report	Carlos Augusto 61'; Birindelli (yellow card) 86'; Machín (yellow card) 88'; Petagna (yellow card) 90+2'	Stadium: Stadio Artemio Franchi; Attendance: 31,190; Referee: Ermanno Feliciani

7 January 2023 17	Fiorentina	2–1	Sassuolo	Florence
15:00 CET (UTC+1)	Milenković (yellow card) 10'; Saponara 48'; Dodô (yellow card) 57'; Castrovilli (yellow card) 75'; González 90+1' (pen.), (yellow card) 90+4'	Report	Traorè (yellow card) 19'; Ruan (yellow card) 26'; Berardi 57', (yellow card) 90+2'	Stadium: Stadio Artemio Franchi; Attendance: 29,695; Referee: Gianluca Manganiello

15 January 2023 18	Roma	2–0	Fiorentina	Rome
20:45 CET (UTC+1)	Smalling (yellow card) 15'; Dybala 40', 82'; Kumbulla (yellow card) 55'; Bove (yellow card) 63'	Report	Dodô (yellow card) 4' (yellow-red card) 24'; González (yellow card) 56'; Igor (yellow card) 79'	Stadium: Stadio Olimpico; Attendance: 61,327; Referee: Antonio Giua

21 January 2023 19	Fiorentina	0–1	Torino	Florence
20:45 CET (UTC+1)	Saponara (yellow card) 45'; Duncan (yellow card) 50'	Report	Miranchuk 33'; Ricci (yellow card) 45'; Sanabria (yellow card) 88'	Stadium: Stadio Artemio Franchi; Attendance: 29,281; Referee: Federico Dionisi

29 January 2023 20	Lazio	1–1	Fiorentina	Rome
18:00 CET (UTC+1)	Casale 8'; Zaccagni (yellow card) 45+2'; Immobile (yellow card) 90+3'	Report	Kouamé (yellow card) 40'; González 49'; Saponara (yellow card) 67'; Amrabat (yellow card) 68'	Stadium: Stadio Olimpico; Attendance: 40,000; Referee: Andrea Colombo

5 February 2023 21	Fiorentina	1–2	Bologna	Florence
18:00 CET (UTC+1)	Saponara 19'; Igor (yellow card) 29'; Mandragora (yellow card) 82'	Report	Orsolini 14', (yellow card) 18'; Posch 47'; Schouten (yellow card) 53'; Domínguez (yellow card) 67'; Lucumí (yellow card) 76'	Stadium: Stadio Artemio Franchi; Attendance: 30,546; Referee: Luca Pairetto

12 February 2023 22	Juventus	1–0	Fiorentina	Turin
18:00 CET (UTC+1)	Rabiot (yellow card) 2', (goal) 34'; Alex Sandro (yellow card) 19'; Bremer (yellow card) 85'; Kostić (yellow card) 88'; Kean (yellow card) 90+6'	Report	Duncan (yellow card) 31'; Bonaventura (yellow card) 48'	Stadium: Juventus Stadium; Attendance: 34,844; Referee: Michael Fabbri

19 February 2023 23	Fiorentina	1–1	Empoli	Florence
15:00 CET (UTC+1)	Martínez Quarta (yellow card) 70'; Cabral 85'	Report	Akpa Akpro (yellow card) 27'; Cambiaghi 28'; Ismajli (yellow card) 45+4'; Cacace (yellow card) 60'; Baldanzi (yellow card) 64'; Bandinelli (yellow card) 73'	Stadium: Stadio Artemio Franchi; Attendance: 29,663; Referee: Alessandro Prontera

27 February 2023 24	Hellas Verona	0–3	Fiorentina	Verona
18:30 CET (UTC+1)	Doig (yellow card) 24'; Faraoni (yellow card) 34'; Braaf (yellow card) 82'	Report	Barák 12', (yellow card) 29'; Igor (yellow card) 27'; Cabral 38'; Amrabat (yellow card) 50'; Biraghi 89'	Stadium: Stadio Marcantonio Bentegodi; Attendance: 17,787; Referee: Federico La Penna

4 March 2023 25	Fiorentina	2–1	Milan	Florence
20:45 CET (UTC+1)	Cabral (yellow card) 29'; González 49' (pen.), (yellow card) 70'; Ikoné (yellow card) 59'; Jović 87'	Report	Thiaw (yellow card) 12'; Messias (yellow card) 35'; Kalulu (yellow card) 80'; Hernandez 90+5'	Stadium: Stadio Artemio Franchi; Attendance: 40,410; Referee: Marco Di Bello

12 March 2023 26	Cremonese	0–2	Fiorentina	Cremona
15:00 CET (UTC+1)	Ferrari (yellow card) 52'	Report	Mandragora 27', (yellow card) 55'; Cabral 50'; Brekalo (yellow card) 60'	Stadium: Stadio Giovanni Zini; Attendance: 11,506; Referee: Matteo Mercenaro

19 March 2023 27	Fiorentina	1–0	Lecce	Florence
15:00 CET (UTC+1)	Gallo 27' (o.g.); Igor (yellow card) 63'	Report	Blin (yellow card) 25'; Maleh (yellow card) 72'; Umtiti (yellow card) 89'	Stadium: Stadio Artemio Franchi; Attendance: 34,604; Referee: Rosario Abisso

1 April 2023 28	Internazionale	0–1	Fiorentina	Milan
18:00 CEST (UTC+2)	Brozović (yellow card) 77'; Acerbi (yellow card) 90+4'	Report	Bonaventura 53'; Castrovilli (yellow card) 58'; Ikoné (yellow card) 76'; Amrabat (yellow card) 79'	Stadium: San Siro; Attendance: 73,576; Referee: Fabio Maresca

8 April 2023 29	Fiorentina	1–1	Spezia	Florence
14:30 CEST (UTC+2)	Wiśniewski 25' (o.g.)	Report	Maldini (yellow card) 35'; Nzola 32', (yellow card) 45'; Gyasi (yellow card) 45+1'; Ampadu (yellow card) 63'; Bastoni (yellow card) 68'; Ekdal (yellow card) 72'; Wiśniewski (yellow card) 77'	Stadium: Stadio Artemio Franchi; Attendance: 35,863; Referee: Federico Dionisi

17 April 2023 30	Fiorentina	1–1	Atalanta	Florence
20:45 CEST (UTC+2)	Cabral 56' (pen.); Martínez Quarta (yellow card) 75'	Report	Mæhle 37', (yellow card) 38'; Éderson (yellow card) 60'; Tolói (yellow card) 72'	Stadium: Stadio Artemio Franchi; Attendance: 29,628; Referee: Marco Guida

23 April 2023 31	Monza	3–2	Fiorentina	Monza
15:00 CEST (UTC+2)	Biraghi 26' (o.g.); Carlos Augusto (yellow card) 33'; Mota 43'; Pessina 59' (pen.); Izzo (yellow card) 69'; Rovella (yellow card) 90+2'	Report	Kouamé 8'; Saponara 13'; Barák (yellow card) 39'; Milenković (yellow card) 43'; Amrabat (yellow card) 39'	Stadium: Stadio Brianteo; Attendance: 13,118; Referee: Juan Luca Sacchi

30 April 2023 32	Fiorentina	5–0	Sampdoria	Florence
18:00 CEST (UTC+2)	Castrovilli 45+2'; Dodô 62'; Duncan 66'; Kouamé 76', (yellow card) 81'; Terzić 86', (yellow card) 89'	Report	Murillo (yellow card) 60'	Stadium: Stadio Artemio Franchi; Attendance: 30,602; Referee: Antonio Giua

3 May 2023 33	Salernitana	3–3	Fiorentina	Salerno
18:30 CEST (UTC+2)	Dia 10', 59', 81' (pen.); Daniliuc (yellow card) 49'; Botheim (yellow card) 51'; Bradarić (yellow card) 84'	Report	González 36'; Mandragora (yellow card) 40'; Castrovilli (yellow card) 43'; Cabral (yellow card) 45'; Martínez Quarta (yellow card) 55'; Ikoné 71'; Biraghi 84'; Duncan (yellow card) 90+4'	Stadium: Stadio Arechi; Attendance: 17,868; Referee: Ivano Pezzuto

7 May 2023 34	Napoli	1–0	Fiorentina	Naples
18:00 CEST (UTC+2)	Osimhen (penalty missed) 48', 74' (pen.)	Report		Stadium: Stadio Diego Armando Maradona; Attendance: 50,719; Referee: Matteo Marchetti

14 May 2023 35	Fiorentina	2–0	Udinese	Florence
15:00 CEST (UTC+2)	Castrovilli 7'; Biraghi (yellow card) 45+4'; Milenković (yellow card) 69'; Venuti (yellow card) 73'; Bonaventura 90'	Report	Ebosele (yellow card) 42'; Walace (yellow card) 45+1'; Zeegelaar (yellow card) 58'	Stadium: Stadio Artemio Franchi; Attendance: 27,383; Referee: Daniele Paterna

21 May 2023 36	Torino	1–1	Fiorentina	Turin
15:00 CEST (UTC+2)	Singo (yellow card) 60'; Sanabria 66'	Report	Mandragora (yellow card) 19'; Jović 48'; Bianco (yellow card) 77'	Stadium: Stadio Olimpico Grande Torino; Attendance: 20,403; Referee: Luca Massimi

27 May 2023 37	Fiorentina	2–1	Roma	Florence
18:00 CEST (UTC+2)	Saponara (yellow card) 25'; Martínez Quarta (yellow card) 43'; Venuti (yellow card) 50'; Jović (yellow card) 64', (goal) 85'; Igor (yellow card) 77'; Ikoné 88'	Report	El Shaarawy 11'; Missori (yellow card) 32'; Solbakken (yellow card) 58'; Svilar (yellow card) 75'	Stadium: Stadio Artemio Franchi; Attendance: 32,829; Referee: Giovanni Ayroldi

2 June 2023 38	Sassuolo	1–3	Fiorentina	Reggio Emilia
21:00 CEST (UTC+2)	Berardi (yellow card) 32', (goal) 71' (pen.); Ruan (yellow card) 55' (yellow-red card) 81'; Rogério (red card) 87'; Marchizza (yellow card) 90+2'	Report	Terzić (yellow card) 7'; Ranieri (yellow card) 32'; Kouamé (yellow card) 45'; Cabral 46', (yellow card) 70'; Saponara 79'; González 83'	Stadium: Mapei Stadium – Città del Tricolore; Attendance: 12,456; Referee: Matteo Marchetti

=== Coppa Italia ===
12 January 2023 Round of 16	Fiorentina	1–0	Sampdoria	Florence
18:00 CET (UTC+1)	Barák 25'; Amrabat (yellow card) 32'	Report	Sabiri (yellow card) 24'; Murillo (yellow card) 54' (yellow-red card) 90+2'; Rincón (yellow card) 88'; Contini (yellow card) 90+6'	Stadium: Stadio Artemio Franchi; Attendance: 10,496; Referee: Daniele Paterna

1 February 2023 Quarter-finals	Fiorentina	2–1	Torino	Florence
18:00 CET (UTC+1)	Jović 65'; Ikoné 90'	Report	Karamoh 90+3'	Stadium: Stadio Artemio Franchi; Attendance: 18,600; Referee: Daniele Doveri

5 April 2023 Semi-finals; First leg	Cremonese	0–2	Fiorentina	Cremona
21:00 CEST (UTC+2)	Aiwu (red card) 73'	Report	Cabral 20'; Martínez Quarta (yellow card) 39'; González 75' (pen.)	Stadium: Stadio Giovanni Zini; Attendance: 13,952; Referee: Maurizio Mariani

27 April 2023 Semi-finals; Second leg	Fiorentina	0–0 (2–0 agg.)	Cremonese	Florence
21:00 CEST (UTC+2)	Dodô (yellow card) 39'; Igor (yellow card) 59'	Report	Ghiglione (yellow card) 21'; Sernicola (yellow card) 82'	Stadium: Stadio Artemio Franchi; Attendance: 31,131; Referee: Livio Marinelli

24 May 2023 Final	Fiorentina	1–2	Internazionale	Rome
21:00 CEST (UTC+2)	González 3', (yellow card) 90'; Martínez Quarta (yellow card) 54'	Report	Martínez 29', 37'; Bastoni (yellow card) 53'	Stadium: Stadio Olimpico; Attendance: 68,500; Referee: Massimiliano Irrati

=== UEFA Europa Conference League ===
==== Play-off round ====
18 August 2022 First leg	Fiorentina (Italy)	2–1	(Netherlands) Twente	Florence, Italy
21:00 CEST (UTC+2)	González 2'; Cabral 31'; Milenković (yellow card) 39'; Amrabat (yellow card) 90+1'; Maleh (yellow card) 90+5'	Report	Smal (yellow card) 33'; Pröpper (yellow card) 55'; Vlap (yellow card) 62'; Černý 64', (yellow card) 70'	Stadium: Stadio Artemio Franchi; Attendance: 16,674; Referee: Daniel Stefanski (Poland)

25 August 2022 Second leg	Twente (Netherlands)	0–0 (1–2 agg.)	(Italy) Fiorentina	Enschede, Netherlands
19:00 CEST (UTC+2)	Pröpper (yellow card) 45+1'; Sadílek (yellow card) 58'; Zerrouki (yellow card) 63'; Hilgers (yellow card) 77'	Report	Ikoné (yellow card) 30'; Maleh (yellow card) 43'; Gollini (yellow card) 76'; Igor (yellow card) 83' (yellow-red card) 90+3'	Stadium: De Grolsch Veste; Attendance: 29,500; Referee: Radu Petrescu (Romania)

==== Group stage ====
The group stage draw was held on 27 August 2022.

Pos	Team	Pld	W	D	L	GF	GA	GD	Pts	Qualification	IBS	FIO	HEA	RFS
1	(Turkey) İstanbul Başakşehir	6	4	1	1	14	3	+11	13 (Note: Tied on head-to-head points. Head-to-head goal difference: İstanbul Başakşehir +2, Fiorentina −2.)	Advance to round of 16	—	3–0	3–1	3–0
2	(Italy) Fiorentina	6	4	1	1	14	6	+8	13	Advance to knockout round play-offs	2–1	—	5–1	1–1
3	(Scotland) Heart of Midlothian	6	2	0	4	6	16	−10	6		0–4	0–3	—	2–1
4	(Latvia) RFS	6	0	2	4	2	11	−9	2		0–0	0–3	0–2	—

Source: UEFA
Rules for classification: Group stage tiebreakers
Notes:

8 September 2022 1	Fiorentina (Italy)	1–1	(Latvia) RFS	Florence, Italy
18:45 CEST (UTC+2)	Barák 56'; Maleh (yellow card) 86'	Report	Panić (yellow card) 33'; Lipušček (yellow card) 43'; Sorokins (yellow card) 54'; Ilić 74', (yellow card) 87'	Stadium: Stadio Artemio Franchi; Attendance: 11,738; Referee: Pavel Orel (Czech Republic)

15 September 2022 2	İstanbul Başakşehir (Turkey)	3–0	(Italy) Fiorentina	Istanbul, Turkey
22:00 TRT (UTC+3)	Gürler 57', 71'; Traoré 90'	Report	Ikoné (yellow card) 22' (yellow-red card) 76'; Amrabat (yellow card) 61'	Stadium: Başakşehir Fatih Terim Stadium; Attendance: 5,857; Referee: Guillermo Cuadra Fernández (Spain)

6 October 2022 3	Heart of Midlothian (Scotland)	0–3	(Italy) Fiorentina	Edinburgh, Scotland
20:00 BST (UTC+1)	Kingsley (yellow card) 25'; Neilson (red card) 48'; Kiomourtzoglou (yellow card) 56'	Report	Mandragora 4'; Kouamé 42'; Jović 79'	Stadium: Tynecastle Park; Attendance: 17,243; Referee: Erik Lambrechts (Belgium)

13 October 2022 4	Fiorentina (Italy)	5–1	(Scotland) Heart of Midlothian	Florence, Italy
18:45 CEST (UTC+2)	Jović 6'; Biraghi 22', (yellow card) 69'; González 32', 79' (pen.); Barák 38'; Venuti (yellow card) 85'	Report	Humphrys 47'; Haring (yellow card) 48'; Sibbick (yellow card) 69'; Cochrane (yellow card) 78'; Smith (yellow card) 87'	Stadium: Stadio Artemio Franchi; Attendance: 18,576; Referee: Ivan Bebek (Croatia)

27 October 2022 5	Fiorentina (Italy)	2–1	(Turkey) İstanbul Başakşehir	Florence, Italy
18:45 CEST (UTC+2)	Jović 26', 61'; Milenković (yellow card) 32'; Mandragora (yellow card) 86'	Report	Aleksić 14'; Okaka (yellow card) 34'; Chouiar (yellow card) 39'; Türüç (yellow card) 67'	Stadium: Stadio Artemio Franchi; Attendance: 14,345; Referee: Allard Lindhout (Netherlands)

3 November 2022 6	RFS (Latvia)	0–3	(Italy) Fiorentina	Riga, Latvia
17:30 EET (UTC+2)	Zjuzins (yellow card) 55'	Report	Barák 7'; Cabral 44'; Saponara 45+2'; Martínez Quarta (yellow card) 77'; Venuti (yellow card) 79'; Bianco (yellow card) 89'	Stadium: Skonto Stadium; Attendance: 6,747; Referee: Mads-Kristoffer Kristoffersen (Denmark)

==== Knockout phase ====
===== Knockout round play-offs =====
The knockout round play-offs draw was held on 7 November 2022.

16 February 2023 First leg	Braga (Portugal)	0–4	(Italy) Fiorentina	Braga, Portugal
17:45 WET (UTC±0)	Tormena (red card) 55'	Report	Jović 45+1', 60'; Venuti (yellow card) 50'; Cabral 79', 90'; Kouamé (yellow card) 86'; Ikoné (yellow card) 89'	Stadium: Estádio Municipal; Attendance: 13,041; Referee: Carlos del Cerro Grande (Spain)

23 February 2023 Second leg	Fiorentina (Italy)	3–2 (7–2 agg.)	(Portugal) Braga	Florence, Italy
21:00 CET (UTC+1)	Mandragora 37'; Dodô (yellow card) 39'; González (yellow card) 56'; Saponara 58'; Martínez Quarta (yellow card) 70'; Biraghi (yellow card) 70'; Cabral 83'	Report	Castro 16'; Djaló 34'	Stadium: Stadio Artemio Franchi; Attendance: 13,603; Referee: Benoît Bastien (France)

===== Round of 16 =====
The round of 16 draw was held on 24 February 2023.

9 March 2023 First leg	Fiorentina (Italy)	1–0	(Turkey) Sivasspor	Florence, Italy
21:00 CET (UTC+1)	Amrabat (yellow card) 58'; Jović (yellow card) 62'; Barák 69'; Cabral (yellow card) 83'; Biraghi (yellow card) 90+1'; Dodô (yellow card) 90+5'	Report	Sáiz (yellow card) 42'; Cofie (yellow card) 90+3'; Gradel (red card) 90+4'	Stadium: Stadio Artemio Franchi; Attendance: 16,255; Referee: Enea Jorgji (Albania)

16 March 2023 Second leg	Sivasspor (Turkey)	1–4 (1–5 agg.)	(Italy) Fiorentina	Sivas, Turkey
20:45 TRT (UTC+3)	Yeşilyurt 35'; Goutas (yellow card) 63'; Ulvestad (yellow card) 76'; Arslan (red card) 81'; Yeşilyurt (yellow card) 90+2'	Report	Cabral 44'; Milenković 62'; Martínez Quarta (yellow card) 65'; Goutas 78' (o.g.); Castrovilli 89'; Milenković (yellow card) 90+2'	Stadium: New Sivas 4 Eylül Stadium; Attendance: 17,864; Referee: Nikola Dabanović (Montenegro)

===== Quarter-finals =====
The quarter-final draw was held on 17 March 2023.

13 April 2023 First leg	Lech Poznań (Poland)	1–4	(Italy) Fiorentina	Poznań, Poland
21:00 CEST (UTC+2)	Velde 20'	Report	Cabral 4'; González 41'; Bonaventura 58'; Ikoné 63'; Ranieri (yellow card) 83'	Stadium: Stadion Poznań; Attendance: 41,609; Referee: Irfan Peljto (Bosnia and Herzegovina)

20 April 2023 Second leg	Fiorentina (Italy)	2–3 (6–4 agg.)	(Poland) Lech Poznań	Florence, Italy
18:45 CEST (UTC+2)	Biraghi (yellow card) 19'; Milenković (yellow card) 35'; Terzić (yellow card) 63'; Venuti (yellow card) 68'; Sottil 78'; Castrovilli 90+2'	Report	Sousa 9'; Sobiech (yellow card) 17', (goal) 69'; Czerwiński (yellow card) 23'; Velde 65' (pen.); Kvekveskiri (yellow card) 83'; Skóraś (yellow card) 88'	Stadium: Stadio Artemio Franchi; Attendance: 23,110; Referee: Rade Obrenovič (Slovenia)

===== Semi-finals =====
The semi-final draw was held on 17 March 2023, after the quarter-final draw.

11 May 2023 First leg	Fiorentina (Italy)	1–2	(Switzerland) Basel	Florence, Italy
21:00 CEST (UTC+2)	Cabral 25'	Report	Kasim (yellow card) 59'; Diouf 71'; Burger (yellow card) 72'; Ndoye (yellow card) 79'; Amdouni 90+3'	Stadium: Stadio Artemio Franchi; Attendance: 34,276; Referee: François Letexier (France)

18 May 2023 Second leg	Basel (Switzerland)	1–3 (a.e.t.) (3–4 agg.)	(Italy) Fiorentina	Basel, Switzerland
21:00 CEST (UTC+2)	Amdouni 55'; Burger (yellow card) 89'	Report	Igor (yellow card) 21'; González 35', 72', (yellow card) 90'; Ranieri (yellow card) 59'; Ikoné (yellow card) 95'; Bonaventura (yellow card) 104'; Barák 120+10', (yellow card) 120+10'	Stadium: St. Jakob-Park; Attendance: 36,000; Referee: José María Sánchez Martínez (Spain)

===== Final =====
The final draw was held on 17 March 2023, after the quarter-final and semi-final draws, to determine the "home" team for administrative purposes.

7 June 2023 Final	Fiorentina (Italy)	1–2	(England) West Ham United	Prague, Czech Republic
21:00 CEST (UTC+2)	Mandragora (yellow card) 66'; Bonaventura 67'; Duncan (yellow card) 67'; Milenković (yellow card) 75'; Amrabat (yellow card) 85'	Report	Benrahma (yellow card) 31', (goal) 62' (pen.); Aguerd (yellow card) 53'; Bowen 90', (yellow card) 90+7'; Cresswell (yellow card) 90+1'	Stadium: Fortuna Arena; Attendance: 17,363; Referee: Carlos del Cerro Grande (Spain)

== Squad statistics ==
No.	Pos	Nat	Player	Total		Serie A		Coppa Italia		UEFA Europa Conference League	
No.	Pos	Nat	Player	Apps	Goals	Apps	Goals	Apps	Goals	Apps	Goals
Goalkeepers
1	GK	(Italy) ITA	Pietro Terracciano	33	0	29	0	1	0	3	0
31	GK	(Italy) ITA	Michele Cerofolini	5	0	4	0	0	0	1	0
Defenders
2	DF	(Brazil) BRA	Dodô	25	1	17+2	1	2	0	2+2	0
3	DF	(Italy) ITA	Cristiano Biraghi	31	3	22+1	2	1+1	0	4+2	1
4	DF	(Serbia) SRB	Nikola Milenković	30	3	17+3	2	1+1	0	7+1	1
15	DF	(Serbia) SRB	Aleksa Terzić	24	1	5+10	1	2	0	7	0
16	DF	(Italy) ITA	Luca Ranieri	4	0	2	0	1	0	1	0
23	DF	(Italy) ITA	Lorenzo Venuti	14	0	5+4	0	0	0	4+1	0
28	DF	(Argentina) ARG	Lucas Martínez Quarta	25	1	13+2	1	3	0	6+1	0
98	DF	(Brazil) BRA	Igor	23	0	13+3	0	1	0	6	0
Midfielders
5	MF	(Italy) ITA	Giacomo Bonaventura	33	6	19+2	5	1+1	0	9+1	1
8	MF	(Italy) ITA	Riccardo Saponara	24	5	7+11	3	0	0	4+2	2
10	MF	(Italy) ITA	Gaetano Castrovilli	20	3	9+3	1	0+1	0	7	2
14	MF	(Italy) ITA	Youssef Maleh	8	0	2+1	0	0	0	3+2	0
32	MF	(Ghana) GHA	Alfred Duncan	21	1	8+8	1	1+1	0	1+2	0
34	MF	(Morocco) MAR	Sofyan Amrabat	32	0	14+4	0	1+1	0	12	0
38	MF	(Italy) ITA	Rolando Mandragora	24	4	10+5	2	0+1	0	5+3	2
42	MF	(Italy) ITA	Alessandro Bianco	6	0	2+1	0	0	0	0+3	0
72	MF	(Czech Republic) CZE	Antonín Barák	24	8	14	2	5	1	4+1	5
77	MF	(Croatia) CRO	Josip Brekalo	8	0	0+3	0	1	0	4	0
Forwards
7	FW	(Serbia) SRB	Luka Jović	35	12	16+9	5	2	1	3+5	6
9	FW	(Brazil) BRA	Arthur Cabral	27	16	6+10	7	0+2	1	7+2	8
11	FW	(France) FRA	Jonathan Ikoné	27	6	13+6	4	1+1	1	4+2	1
22	FW	(Argentina) ARG	Nicolás González	17	13	4+7	5	2	2	2+2	6
33	FW	(Italy) ITA	Riccardo Sottil	12	1	5+4	0	0	0	2+1	1
43	FW	(Italy) ITA	Filippo Distefano	1	0	0	0	0	0	0+1	0
99	FW	(Ivory Coast) CIV	Christian Kouamé	28	5	16+4	4	2	0	4+2	1
Players transferred out during the season
95	GK	(Italy) ITA	Pierluigi Gollini	9	0	3	0	1	0	5	0
24	MF	(Italy) ITA	Marco Benassi	3	0	1+1	0	0	0	0+1	0
27	MF	(Poland) POL	Szymon Żurkowski	4	0	0+2	0	0	0	0+2	0
55	DF	(Serbia) SRB	Matija Nastasić	1	0	0	0	0	0	1	0

Last updated: 5 February 2023
Source: Competitions
