= Alessandro Bianco =

Italian footballer (born 2002)

Personal information
- Date of birth: 1 October 2002 (age 24)
- Place of birth: Turin, Italy
- Height: 1.73 m (5 ft 8 in)
- Position: Midfielder

Team information
- Current team: Modena
- Number: 42

Youth career
- 2009–2010: Orbassano Gabetto
- 2010–2016: Torino
- 2016–2019: Chisola Calcio
- 2018–2019: → Fiorentina (loan)
- 2019–2021: Fiorentina

Senior career*
Years	Team	Apps	(Gls)
2021–2026	Fiorentina	8	(0)
2023–2024	→ Reggiana (loan)	34	(2)
2024–2025	→ Monza (loan)	34	(1)
2025–2026	→ PAOK (loan)	13	(1)
2026–	Modena	1	(0)

International career^{‡}
2020	Italy U18	1	(0)
2021–2022	Italy U20	5	(0)
2023–2025	Italy U21	7	(1)
- * Club domestic league appearances and goals as of 22 August 2026 ‡ National team caps and goals as of 17 June 2025

Alessandro Bianco (born 1 October 2002) is an Italian professional footballer who plays as a midfielder for Serie B club Modena.

== Early life ==
Alessandro Bianco was born in Turin, spending most of its youth in the Metropolitan City of Turin, in a family from Piedmont.

A promising cyclist during his early years, Bianco started to play football as a 7-year-old in Orbassano, but soon joining Torino's academy, Juve's old rival. After progressing through the youth ranks of the club from his hometown, Bianco was not retained by Il Toro as an under-15, and went on to play with amateur side Chisola Calcio, in Vinovo.

Enjoying a few regional and national success with the youth team from Chisola, Bianco quickly attracted the attention of another great Serie A club, signing on loan to ACF Fiorentina in 2018, before making his move a permanent one a year later.

== Club career ==
After a first season with Fiorentina's Primavera, where his team won the Coppa after beating the likes of Milan and Juventus, he made his first appearances on the bench in Serie A during the 2020–21 season, under Cesare Prandelli.

For his second season in Alberto Aquilani's primavera team, Bianco definitely became one of the most prominent member of the under-19, leading his team to another Coppa Primavera win, once more with victories against Milan and Juventus—during which he respectively delivered an assist and scored a goal from a free-kick—before defeating Genoa and eventually Lazio in the final.

After impressing new manager Vincenzo Italiano during the early 2021–22 season, Bianco made his professional debut for ACF Fiorentina on the 13 August 2021, replacing Erick Pulgar during a 4–0 home Coppa Italia win against Cosenza.

Announced on a potential loan move to the Serie B team against which he made his debut, he eventually stayed in Florence, making more bench appearances in Serie A and another on the field in Coppa, again replacing Pulgar, while still playing with the Primavera squad, notably during their victorious Supercoppa Primavera campaign against Empoli.

On 13 July 2023, Bianco moved to Serie B club Reggiana on a loan deal until 30 June 2024.

Upon his return from loan, Bianco made a substitute appearance for Fiorentina in their 2024–25 Serie A season opener and he started their Conference League qualifier against Puskás Akadémia, which ended in a 3–3 draw.

On 30 August 2024, Bianco was loaned by Serie A side Monza.

== International career ==
Alessandro Bianco is youth international for Italy, having already played with the under-18 before his debut professional season at Fiorentina.

== Career statistics ==
As of match played 24 May 2025

Appearances and goals by club, season and competitionClub statistics
Club	Season	League			Coppa Italia		Europe		Other		Total	
Club	Season	Division	Apps	Goals	Apps	Goals	Apps	Goals	Apps	Goals	Apps	Goals
Fiorentina	2022–23	Serie A	7	0	0	0	5 (Note: Appearances in UEFA Europa Conference League)	0	—		12	0
Fiorentina	2024–25	Serie A	1	0	0	0	1 (Note: Appearance in UEFA Conference League)	0	—		2	0
Fiorentina	Total		8	0	0	0	6	0	0	0	14	0
Reggiana (loan)	2023–24	Serie B	34	2	3	0	—		—		37	2
Monza (loan)	2024–25	Serie A	34	1	1	0	—		—		35	1
Career total			76	3	4	0	6	0	0	0	86	3

== Honours ==
Fiorentina Youth

- Coppa Primavera: 2020, 2021;
- Supercoppa Primavera: 2021.

Fiorentina

- Coppa Italia runner-up: 2022–23
- UEFA Europa Conference League runner-up: 2022–23

Individual

- Super League Greece Best Goal: 2025–26 (Matchday 9
