= Igor Julio =

Brazilian footballer (born 1998)

- Igor Julio with Burnley in 2026

Personal information
- Full name: Igor Julio dos Santos de Paulo
- Date of birth: 7 February 1998 (age 28)
- Place of birth: Bom Sucesso, Brazil
- Height: 1.85 m (6 ft 1 in)
- Positions: Centre-back; left-back

Team information
- Current team: Burnley
- Number: 44

Youth career
- Atlético Mineiro
- Sind-Ufla
- Portuguesa Santista
- Red Bull Brasil

Senior career*
Years	Team	Apps	(Gls)
2016	Red Bull Brasil	0	(0)
2016–2017	FC Liefering	36	(0)
2017–2019	Red Bull Salzburg	2	(0)
2018	→ Wolfsberger (loan)	15	(0)
2018–2019	→ Austria Wien (loan)	27	(0)
2019–2021	SPAL	17	(0)
2020–2021	→ Fiorentina (loan)	30	(0)
2021–2023	Fiorentina	57	(0)
2023–2026	Brighton & Hove Albion	37	(0)
2025–2026	→ West Ham United (loan)	4	(0)
2026–	Burnley	10	(0)
- * Club domestic league appearances and goals as of 09:37, 8 November 2026 (UTC)

Igor Julio dos Santos de Paulo (born 7 February 1998), known as Igor Julio or simply Igor, is a Brazilian professional footballer who plays as a centre-back or left-back for EFL Championship club Burnley.

== Club career ==
Born in Bom Sucesso, Minas Gerais, Igor joined Red Bull Brasil's youth setup from Portuguesa Santista. In July 2016, after impressing with the under-20 side, he moved abroad and joined Austrian Bundesliga side Red Bull Salzburg, being initially assigned to the reserve team.

Igor made his professional debut for FC Liefering on 22 July 2016, starting in a 1–0 Austrian First League home win against SV Horn. After being a regular starter, he made his first team debut the following 28 May, playing the full 90 minutes in a 1–0 home defeat of Rheindorf Altach.

Igor was promoted to Red Bull Salzburg's main squad on 26 May 2017, but continued to appear mainly with the B-team. On 7 January 2018, he was loaned to fellow top-tier club Wolfsberger, until June.

On 2 July 2018, Igor moved to Austria Wien also in the first division, on a season-long loan deal.

On 26 June 2019, Igor signed with Italian Serie A club SPAL a contract until 2023.

On 31 January 2020, Igor joined Fiorentina on a two-year loan with an obligation to buy. In June 2023, he came on as an 84th-minute substitute for Luca Ranieri in the Fiorentina team which finished runner-up in the 2022–23 Europa Conference League, losing 2–1 to West Ham United in the final.

On 26 July 2023, Premier League side Brighton & Hove Albion announced the signing of Igor on a four-year deal, for a reported fee of €17 million. Igor made his Brighton debut on 8 October 2023, playing sixty-three minutes in a 2–2 home draw against Liverpool in the Premier League.

On 1 September 2025, Igor joined fellow Premier League club West Ham United on a season-long loan. However, on 27 January 2026, the loan was cut short and he return to Brighton, having made just four appearances for the London club.

On 1 September 2026, Igor moved to recently relegated EFL Championship club Burnley for an undisclosed fee on a permanent deal.

== Career statistics ==
As of match played 7 November 2026

Appearances and goals by club, season and competition
Club	Season	League			National cup (Note: Includes Austrian Cup, Coppa Italia, FA Cup)		League cup (Note: Includes EFL Cup)		Europe		Total	
Club	Season	Division	Apps	Goals	Apps	Goals	Apps	Goals	Apps	Goals	Apps	Goals
Red Bull Brasil	2016	Série B	0	0	0	0	—		—		0	0
FC Liefering	2016–17	Austrian First League	25	0	—		—		—		25	0
FC Liefering	2017–18	Austrian First League	11	0	—		—		—		11	0
FC Liefering	Total		36	0	—		—		—		36	0
Red Bull Salzburg	2016–17	Austrian Bundesliga	1	0	0	0	—		0	0	1	0
Red Bull Salzburg	2017–18	Austrian Bundesliga	1	0	2	0	—		0	0	3	0
Red Bull Salzburg	Total		2	0	2	0	—		0	0	4	0
Wolfsberger (loan)	2017–18	Austrian Bundesliga	15	0	—		—		—		15	0
Austria Wien (loan)	2018–19	Austrian Bundesliga	27	0	3	0	—		—		30	0
SPAL	2019–20	Serie A	17	0	3	1	—		—		20	1
Fiorentina (loan)	2019–20	Serie A	9	0	0	0	—		—		9	0
Fiorentina (loan)	2020–21	Serie A	21	0	3	0	—		—		24	0
Fiorentina	2021–22	Serie A	30	0	5	0	—		—		35	0
Fiorentina	2022–23	Serie A	27	0	3	0	—		12 (Note: One appearance in UEFA Champions League, eleven in UEFA Europa Conference League)	0	42	0
Fiorentina	Total		87	0	11	0	—		12	0	110	0
Brighton & Hove Albion	2023–24	Premier League	24	0	2	0	1	0	6 (Note: Appearances in UEFA Europa League)	0	33	0
Brighton & Hove Albion	2024–25	Premier League	13	0	0	0	3	0	—		16	0
Brighton & Hove Albion	2025–26	Premier League	0	0	0	0	1	0	—		1	0
Brighton & Hove Albion	Total		37	0	2	0	5	0	6	0	50	0
West Ham United (loan)	2025–26	Premier League	4	0	0	0	—		—		4	0
Burnley	2026–27	Championship	10	0	0	0	—		—		10	0
Career total			235	0	21	1	5	0	18	0	279	1

== Honours ==
Fiorentina

- Coppa Italia runner-up: 2022–23
- UEFA Europa Conference League runner-up: 2022–23
