= Gaetano Castrovilli =

Italian footballer (born 1997)

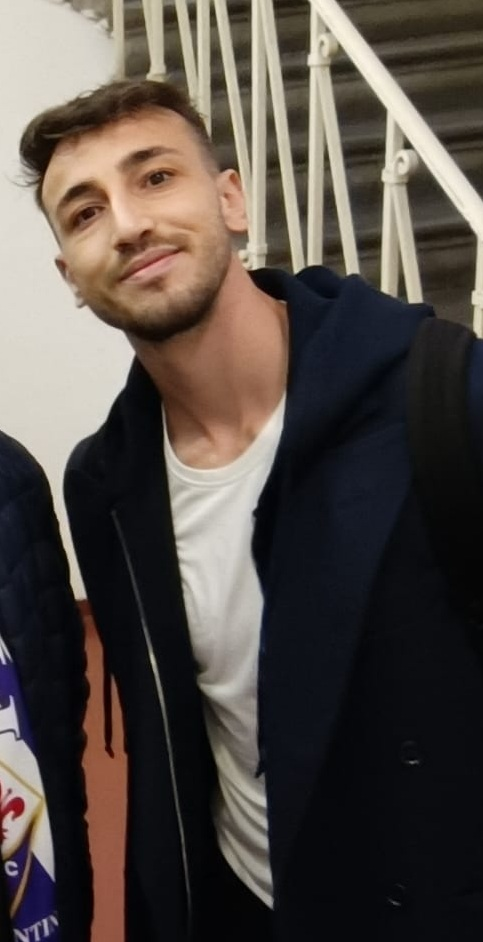
- Castrovilli in 2024

Personal information
- Full name: Gaetano Castrovilli
- Date of birth: 17 February 1997 (age 29)
- Place of birth: Canosa di Puglia, Italy
- Height: 1.87 m (6 ft 2 in)
- Position: Midfielder

Youth career
- 2006–2008: Minervino
- 2008–2015: Bari

Senior career*
Years	Team	Apps	(Gls)
2015–2017	Bari	11	(0)
2017–2024	Fiorentina	111	(12)
2017–2019	→ Cremonese (loan)	52	(5)
2024–2025	Lazio	9	(0)
2025	→ Monza (loan)	12	(0)
2025–2026	Bari	17	(1)
2026	Cesena	7	(0)

International career
2017–2018	Italy U20	6	(2)
2018	Italy U21	2	(0)
2019–2021	Italy	4	(0)
Medal record
Men's Football
Representing Italy
UEFA European Championship
Winner	2020 Europe
- * Club domestic league appearances and goals as of 13 May 2026

Gaetano Castrovilli Cavaliere OMRI (born 17 February 1997) is an Italian professional footballer who plays as a midfielder.

== Club career ==
=== Bari ===
Castrovilli initially started playing football with the Minervino football school. At the age of 11, he joined the Bari youth system. He went on to make his debut for the first team in Serie B in 2015, and later broke into the starting line-up under manager Roberto Stellone during the 2016–17 season, making 11 appearances for the club in total.

=== Fiorentina ===
His performances caught the attention of Fiorentina, and he was later sent on loan to join the Florentine youth side in order to take part in the Torneo di Viareggio in 2016, during which he scored a goal in a 1–1 draw against Argentine side Belgrano; the senior side eventually acquired him from Bari on a permanent basis that year for €400,000. After six months with the primavera side, in 2017 he was then sent on loan to Cremonese in Serie B for two seasons in 2017, where he made 53 appearances in total, scoring 5 goals.

In 2019, he returned to Fiorentina, and was included in Vincenzo Montella's first team plans; he went on to make his Serie A debut against Napoli later that year.

=== Lazio and loan to Monza ===
In July 2024, Castrovilli joined Lazio on a free transfer. On 31 January 2025, he was loaned to Monza for the remainder of the 2024–25 season.

=== Return to Bari ===
On 21 August 2025, Castrovilli returned to Bari on a one-season deal.

=== Cesena ===
On 2 February 2026, Castrovilli signed a contract with Cesena until 30 June 2026.

== International career ==
Castrovilli with Italy in 2021

Castrovilli made his senior debut for Italy under manager Roberto Mancini, on 15 November 2019, coming on as a late substitute for Lorenzo Insigne in a 3–0 away win over Bosnia and Herzegovina, in a Euro 2020 qualifier.

Following an injury to Lorenzo Pellegrini, Castrovilli was called-up in June 2021 by Mancini for Italy's UEFA Euro 2020 squad. He made his first and only appearance of the tournament in Italy's final group match, a 1–0 victory against Wales in Rome on 20 June, coming on as a late second-half substitute for Matteo Pessina; the result allowed them to top their group. On 11 July, Castrovilli won the European Championship with Italy following a 3–2 penalty shoot-out victory over England at Wembley Stadium in the final, after a 1–1 draw in extra-time.

== Style of play ==
Castrovilli is an offensive midfielder, capable of playing as an attacking midfielder or as an offensive–minded central midfielder, known as the mezzala role in Italian football jargon. He has also been deployed as a left winger, a position which allows him to cut onto his right foot. Despite not having a particularly low centre of gravity, he is still capable of changing direction quickly, and is also known for his technique, dribbling skills, and use of feints, as well as his ability to exploit spaces and create a numerical advantage for his team when attacking with his late runs from deep. He is often involved in the build-up of attacking plays, although he is also known for his defensive work-rate, tackling, and ability to cover ground.

== Personal life ==
In 2022, Castrovilli married Italian model Rachele Risaliti, with whom he had his first child in February 2024.

== Career statistics ==
=== Club ===
As of match played 24 May 2025

Appearances and goals by club, season and competition
Club	Season	League			Coppa Italia		Europe		Other		Total	
Club	Season	Division	Apps	Goals	Apps	Goals	Apps	Goals	Apps	Goals	Apps	Goals
Bari	2014–15	Serie B	1	0	–		–		–		1	0
Bari	2016–17	Serie B	10	0	1	0	–		–		11	0
Bari	Total		11	0	1	0	0	0	0	0	12	0
Cremonese (loan)	2017–18	Serie B	26	1	2	0	–		–		28	1
Cremonese (loan)	2018–19	Serie B	26	4	1	1	–		–		27	5
Cremonese (loan)	Total		52	5	3	1	0	0	0	0	55	6
Fiorentina	2019–20	Serie A	33	3	2	0	–		–		35	3
Fiorentina	2020–21	Serie A	34	5	3	0	–		–		37	5
Fiorentina	2021–22	Serie A	23	1	4	0	–		–		27	1
Fiorentina	2022–23	Serie A	15	2	4	0	7 (Note: Appearances in UEFA Europa Conference League)	2	–		26	4
Fiorentina	2023–24	Serie A	6	1	0	0	0	0	–		6	1
Fiorentina	Total		111	12	13	0	7	2	0	0	131	14
Lazio	2024–25	Serie A	9	0	1	0	0	0	–		10	0
Monza (loan)	2024–25	Serie A	12	0	–		–		–		12	0
Career total			195	17	18	1	7	2	0	0	220	20

=== International ===
Appearances and goals by national team and year
National team	Year	Apps	Goals
Italy	2019	1	0
Italy	2020	0	0
Italy	2021	3	0
Total		4	0

== Honours ==
Fiorentina

- Coppa Italia runner-up: 2022–23
- UEFA Europa Conference League runner-up: 2022–23, 2023–24

Italy

- UEFA European Championship: 2020

Orders

- 5th Class / Knight: Cavaliere Ordine al Merito della Repubblica Italiana: 2021
