= Vincenzo Italiano =

Italian football manager (born 1977)

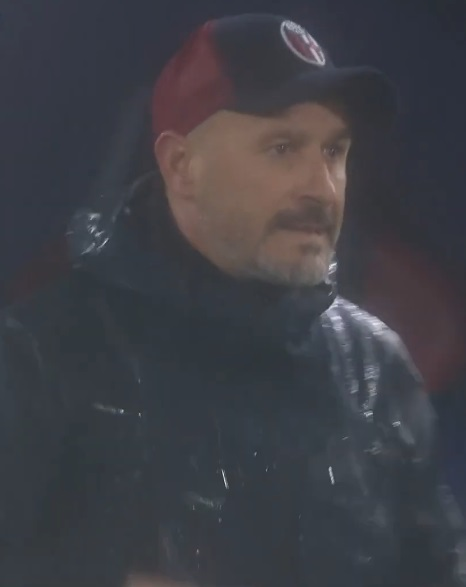
- Italiano with Bologna in 2025

Personal information
- Full name: Vincenzo Italiano
- Date of birth: 10 December 1977 (age 48)
- Place of birth: Karlsruhe, West Germany
- Height: 1.76 m (5 ft 9 in)
- Position: Midfielder

Team information
- Current team: Beşiktaş (manager)

Senior career*
Years	Team	Apps	(Gls)
1994–1996	Trapani	7	(0)
1996–2005	Hellas Verona	196	(21)
2005	Genoa	9	(0)
2005–2007	Hellas Verona	52	(3)
2007–2009	Chievo	49	(7)
2009–2012	Padova	83	(9)
2013	Perugia	3	(0)
2013–2014	Lumezzane	11	(0)
Total		410	(40)

Managerial career
- 2016–2017: Vigontina San Paolo
- 2017: Vigontina San Paolo
- 2017–2018: Union ArzignanoChiampo
- 2018–2019: Trapani
- 2019–2021: Spezia
- 2021–2024: Fiorentina
- 2024–2026: Bologna
- 2026–: Beşiktaş
- * Club domestic league appearances and goals

Vincenzo Italiano (born 10 December 1977) is an Italian professional football manager and former player who played as a midfielder. He is the head coach of Turkish Süper Lig side Beşiktaş.

== Early life ==
Italiano was born in Karlsruhe, West Germany, to Sicilian parents originally from Ribera and later moved back to their hometown when he was six months of age.

== Playing career ==
After starting his professional career with Trapani, he played for Hellas Verona (for most of his career), first in Serie A and later in Serie B. Italiano made his debut in Serie A with Hellas Verona on 2 February 1997, under manager Luigi Cagni, in Serie A, at the age of 19, in a 6–1 away defeat to Bologna; Verona were relegated at the end of the 1996–97 Serie A season. After helping his team earn promotion back to Serie A in 1998–99, he scored his first Serie A goal on 5 November 2000, in a 2–2 home draw against Inter Milan, but was later sent off for a double booking following his goal celebration. Italiano then had a brief spell with Genoa in 2005, before returning to Verona the following season.

Italiano then appeared in Serie A again, albeit briefly, with cross-city rivals Chievo on 14 January 2007 against Catania; he helped them achieve promotion back to Serie A by winning the Serie B title the following season, and later helping them avoid relegation the season after that. He subsequently joined Padova in 2009, and later had spells with Perugia and Lumezzane before retiring in 2014.

=== Style of play ===
Italiano's playing role was that of a versatile and dynamic central midfield playmaker, known for his tackling and passing range, in particular his ability to play long balls. He often played in the regista role as a deep-lying playmaker in midfield, and was influenced by Demetrio Albertini and Andrea Pirlo. In addition to his vision and ability to dictate the tempo of his teams' plays, Italiano was also known for his powerful striking ability from outside the box.

== Coaching career ==
=== Early years ===
After his retirement as a player, he started a coaching career in Veneto for a number of amateur teams. In 2017, he joined Union ArzignanoChiampo, which won him interest from Serie C club Trapani who hired him for the 2018–19 season.

Under his guidance, Trapani concluded the 2018–19 season in second place behind champions Juve Stabia, and then successfully contested the playoff phase, winning promotion to Serie B after defeating Piacenza 2–0 on aggregate.

=== Spezia ===
Following his successful season with Trapani, Italiano was subsequently hired by ambitious Serie B club Spezia as the club's new head coach for the 2019–20 season.

In his first season in charge, Italiano immediately achieved promotion with Spezia to Serie A for the first time in the club's history after edging Frosinone in the promotion play-offs. He successively guided Spezia in their 2020–21 Serie A campaign, succeeding in keeping the small Ligurian club in the top flight in his debut season in the Italian top division.

=== Fiorentina ===
Italiano's successes with Spezia won him the interest of Fiorentina, who ultimately signed him as their new head coach on a two-year deal. In his first season in charge, Italiano led Fiorentina to win a spot for the 2022–23 UEFA Europa Conference League by finishing 7th in Serie A, thus marking a return into European football for the Viola after several years. Despite interest from other clubs, Italiano was confirmed as Fiorentina manager for two more seasons.

Italiano then led Fiorentina to the 2023 UEFA Europa Conference League Final the following season, the club's first European final since 1990. Their memorable campaign ended with a narrow 2–1 defeat to Premier League side West Ham United in the final minute of regulation time. Fiorentina finished 8th in the 2022–23 season, in what seemed as though Fiorentina have missed out on European Competition but surprisingly qualified for the 2023–24 UEFA Europa Conference League due to seventh placed team, rivals Juventus, being banned from Conference League and Europe altogether, so Fiorentina replaced Juventus as Italy's representative for the Conference League. Fiorentina also reached the 2023 Coppa Italia final, suffering a 2–1 defeat to Inter Milan.

He never started the same starting eleven in consecutive games during a 141-match run that ended on 2 March 2024, when he finally selected the same starting line-up against both Lazio at home and Torino away in the league. Italiano made even more history with Fiorentina as they qualified for the 2024 UEFA Europa Conference League Final, eliminating Club Brugge 4–3 on aggregate in the semi-finals of the competition; Italiano became the first manager of Fiorentina to reach back to back European finals and the first to reach back to back Conference League finals. However, on 29 May, Fiorentina lost out to Olympiacos 1–0, conceding late in the second half of extra-time, their second consecutive final defeat in the competition. Following the final match of the Serie A season on 2 June, in which Fiorentina managed a 3–2 away win over Atalanta, finishing in eighth place with 60 points and qualifying for the Conference League for the third consecutive season, Italiano confirmed that he would be leaving the club in the summer.

=== Bologna ===
On 5 June 2024, Italiano was officially appointed as the head coach of Serie A side Bologna, signing a two-year contract with the club. On 14 May 2025, he led the club to a 1–0 victory over Milan in the Coppa Italia final, clinching their first title in the competition in 51 years. On 28 May 2026, Italiano left the club by mutual consent.

=== Beşiktaş ===
On 5 June 2026, Turkish Süper Lig club Beşiktaş announced the arrival of Italiano in Istanbul as the club entered formal negotiations with him over the position of head coach. A day later, he signed a contract with the club until 2028.

== Style of management ==
Italiano is known for his pragmatic offensive playing style as a manager. Tactically, he used the 4–3–3 formation during his time as head coach of Spezia, with a deep-lying playmaker flanked by two box-to-box midfielders, or mezzali, who were capable of making late attacking runs off the ball. His team was capable of defending either in a deep or mid-block, with a compact shape, restricting spaces for his opponents, while also incorporating aspects of man-to-man marking off the ball. After winning back possession, his Spezia side were known for moving the ball quickly with their passing to initiate counter-attacks, and utilised the wings without resorting to traditional wing-play. In a similar manner to Arrigo Sacchi, Italiano believes that all players should be involved in the build-up of attacking plays, regardless of their roles on the pitch. At Fiorentina, he demonstrated his versatility, shifting between different formations such as the 4–4–2 and the 4–2–3–1 to suit his players, although he continued to use his favoured 4–3–3 when possible, in particular following the signing of regista Arthur Melo in midfield in 2023. His team was known for alternating between high-intensity attacking play and a slower possession-based style. He also placed more importance on the plays of his attacking full-backs. His team were known for their hard-working, aggressive, and disciplined approach, which made them a difficult opponent even for larger sides, and he made use of heavy pressing and a high defensive line. His striker usually functions in a more creative role, dropping deep to receive the ball and link-up with teammates, or provides depth to the team with his runs.

While Italiano has earned praise in the media as promising manager, he has also been criticised by certain pundits for his overly predictable possession-based style, and for his teams' inability to convert their chances or score many goals despite controlling the ball. Others have instead criticised him for his game-plans, as his Fiorentina side often lost game in seemingly preventable manners, which has led the press to question his teams' mentality, in particular following their three consecutive final defeats between 2022 and 2024. Italiano believes in the importance of striking balance between attack and defence, as well as dressing room-management, motivation, and communication as coach. Italiano has cited the offensive styles and formations of Pep Guardiola, Maurizio Sarri, Jürgen Klopp, Luis Enrique, and Zdeněk Zeman as his inspirations as a manager; a former director of his likened him to Guardiola, describing him as "un piccolo Pep" ("a little Pep," in Italian).

== Managerial statistics ==
As of 22 November 2026

Managerial record by team and tenure
Team	Nat	From	To	Record							
Team	Nat	From	To	G	W	D	L	GF	GA	GD	Win %
Vigontina San Paolo	(Italy)	18 June 2016	3 January 2017	19	2	8	9	21	34	−13	10.53
Vigontina San Paolo	(Italy)	28 February 2017	31 May 2017	9	2	4	3	16	16	+0	22.22
Union ArzignanoChiampo	(Italy)	31 May 2017	28 July 2018	38	21	12	5	88	51	+37	55.26
Trapani	(Italy)	28 July 2018	19 June 2019	47	27	11	9	73	43	+30	57.45
Spezia	(Italy)	19 June 2019	30 June 2021	86	32	22	32	126	123	+3	37.21
Fiorentina	(Italy)	30 June 2021	2 June 2024	162	77	36	49	263	194	+69	47.53
Bologna	(Italy)	1 July 2024	28 May 2026	107	46	31	30	147	126	+21	42.99
Beşiktaş	(Turkey)	5 June 2026	present	22	15	2	5	46	24	+22	68.18
Total				490	222	126	142	780	610	+170	45.31

== Honours ==
=== Player ===
Hellas Verona

- Serie B: 1998–99

Chievo Verona

- Serie B: 2007–08

=== Manager ===
Trapani

- Serie C play-offs: 2019

Spezia

- Serie B play-offs: 2020

Fiorentina

- Coppa Italia runner-up: 2022–23
- UEFA Europa Conference League runner-up: 2022–23, 2023–24

Bologna

- Coppa Italia: 2024–25

=== Individual ===
- Serie A Coach of the Month: May 2023, December 2023, March 2025
- Golden Neptune of the City of Bologna (Bologna, 23 May 2025)
