= Dodô (footballer, born 1998) =

Brazilian footballer

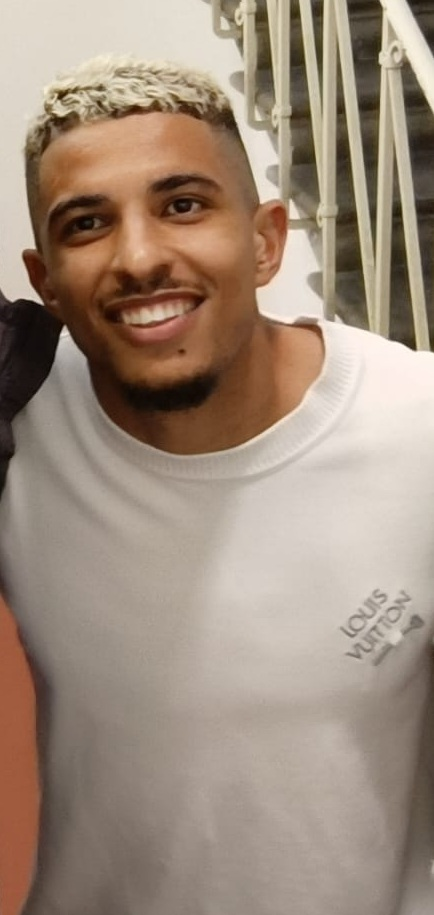
- Dodô in 2024

Personal information
- Full name: Domilson Cordeiro dos Santos
- Date of birth: 17 November 1998 (age 27)
- Place of birth: Taubaté, Brazil
- Height: 1.66 m (5 ft 5 in)
- Position: Right-back

Team information
- Current team: Fiorentina
- Number: 2

Youth career
- 2012–2014: Taubaté
- 2014–2016: Coritiba

Senior career*
Years	Team	Apps	(Gls)
2016–2017	Coritiba	49	(0)
2018–2022	Shakhtar Donetsk	97	(5)
2018–2019	→ Vitória Guimarães (loan)	9	(1)
2022–	Fiorentina	114	(2)

International career
2015	Brazil U17	2	(0)
2016–2018	Brazil U20	11	(0)
2020	Brazil U23	5	(0)
- * Club domestic league appearances and goals as of 24 August 2026 (UTC)

Domilson Cordeiro dos Santos (born 17 November 1998), commonly known as Dodô, is a Brazilian professional footballer who plays as a right-back for Serie A club Fiorentina.

== Club career ==
=== Coritiba ===
Born in Taubaté, São Paulo, Brazil, Dodô started his career at hometown club Taubaté in 2012 playing as a forward. In 2014, he moved to fellow Brazilian side Coritiba and was promoted to the first team in 2016.

Dodô made his first team debut on 11 March 2016, starting in a 3–0 home win against Avaí, for the year's Primeira Liga competition. He made his Série A debut on 14 May, starting in a 1–0 home win against Cruzeiro.

Dodô established himself as a starter at Coxa, contributing with 26 league appearances during his first season, as his side narrowly avoided relegation; his contract was also renewed until June 2018 in September.

=== Shakhtar Donetsk ===
Amidst interest from clubs like Schalke 04 and Benfica, Dodô joined Ukrainian club Shakhtar Donetsk on 22 November 2017, for a fee of € 2 million. He made his debut abroad on 7 April 2018, coming on as a late substitute for fellow countryman Alan Patrick in a 2–0 away defeat of NK Veres Rivne.

==== Vitória de Guimarães (loan) ====
On 29 July 2018, Dodô was loaned to Portuguese club Vitória Guimarães. He made his debut for the club on 6 August, starting in a 2–0 away loss against CD Tondela, for the campaign's Taça da Liga.

Dodô scored his first professional goal on 19 December 2018, netting the game's only in an away success over Boavista FC, for the Taça de Portugal championship.

=== Fiorentina ===
On 22 July 2022, Dodô moved abroad to Italy, signing for Italian top-tier Serie A side Fiorentina.

== International career ==
A former Brazilian youth international, Dodô played for the under-17 squad in the 2015 FIFA U-17 World Cup, and was a part of the under-20s for 2017 South American Youth Football Championship. He played nine matches in the latter tournament, eight as a starter.

== Career statistics ==
As of match played 24 August 2026

Appearances and goals by club, season and competition
Club	Season	League			National cup (Note: Includes Copa do Brasil, Ukrainian Cup, Taça de Portugal, Coppa Italia)		League cup (Note: Includes Taça da Liga)		Continental		Other		Total	
Club	Season	Division	Apps	Goals	Apps	Goals	Apps	Goals	Apps	Goals	Apps	Goals	Apps	Goals
Coritiba	2016	Série A	26	0	2	0	—		2 (Note: Appearances in Copa Sudamericana)	0	1 (Note: Appearance in Primeira Liga)	0	31	0
Coritiba	2017	Série A	19	0	0	0	—		—		4	0	23	0
Coritiba	Total		45	0	2	0	—		2	0	5	0	54	0
Shakhtar Donetsk	2017–18	Ukrainian Premier League	2	0	1	0	—		0	0	0	0	3	0
Shakhtar Donetsk	2019–20	Ukrainian Premier League	23	1	1	0	—		10 (Note: Five appearances and one goal in UEFA Champions League, five appearances and one goal in UEFA Europa League)	2	0	0	34	3
Shakhtar Donetsk	2020–21	Ukrainian Premier League	23	2	0	0	—		10 (Note: Six appearances in UEFA Champions League, four appearances in UEFA Europa League)	0	1 (Note: Appearance in Ukrainian Super Cup)	0	34	2
Shakhtar Donetsk	2021–22	Ukrainian Premier League	14	0	1	0	—		10 (Note: Appearances in UEFA Champions League)	0	1	0	26	0
Shakhtar Donetsk	Total		62	3	3	0	—		30	2	2	0	97	5
Vitória de Guimarães (loan)	2018–19	Primeira Liga	9	1	2	1	1	0	0	0	—		12	2
Fiorentina	2022–23	Serie A	33	1	5	0	—		12 (Note: Appearances in UEFA Europa Conference League)	0	—		50	1
Fiorentina	2023–24	Serie A	9	0	1	0	—		8	0	—		18	0
Fiorentina	2024–25	Serie A	35	0	1	0	—		10 (Note: Appearances in UEFA Conference League)	0	—		46	0
Fiorentina	2025–26	Serie A	36	1	0	0	—		11	1	—		47	2
Fiorentina	2026–27	Serie A	1	0	1	0	—		—		—		2	0
Fiorentina	Total		114	2	8	0	—		41	2	—		163	3
Career total			230	6	15	1	1	0	73	3	7	0	325	10

== Honours ==
Coritiba

- Campeonato Paranaense: 2017

Shakhtar Donetsk

- Ukrainian Premier League: 2019–20
- Ukrainian Cup: 2017–18
- Ukrainian Super Cup: 2021

Fiorentina

- Coppa Italia runner-up: 2022–23
- UEFA Europa Conference League runner-up: 2022–23, 2023–24

=== Individual ===
- UEFA Europa Conference League Team of the Season: 2023–24
