= Lucas Martínez Quarta =

Argentine footballer (born 1996)

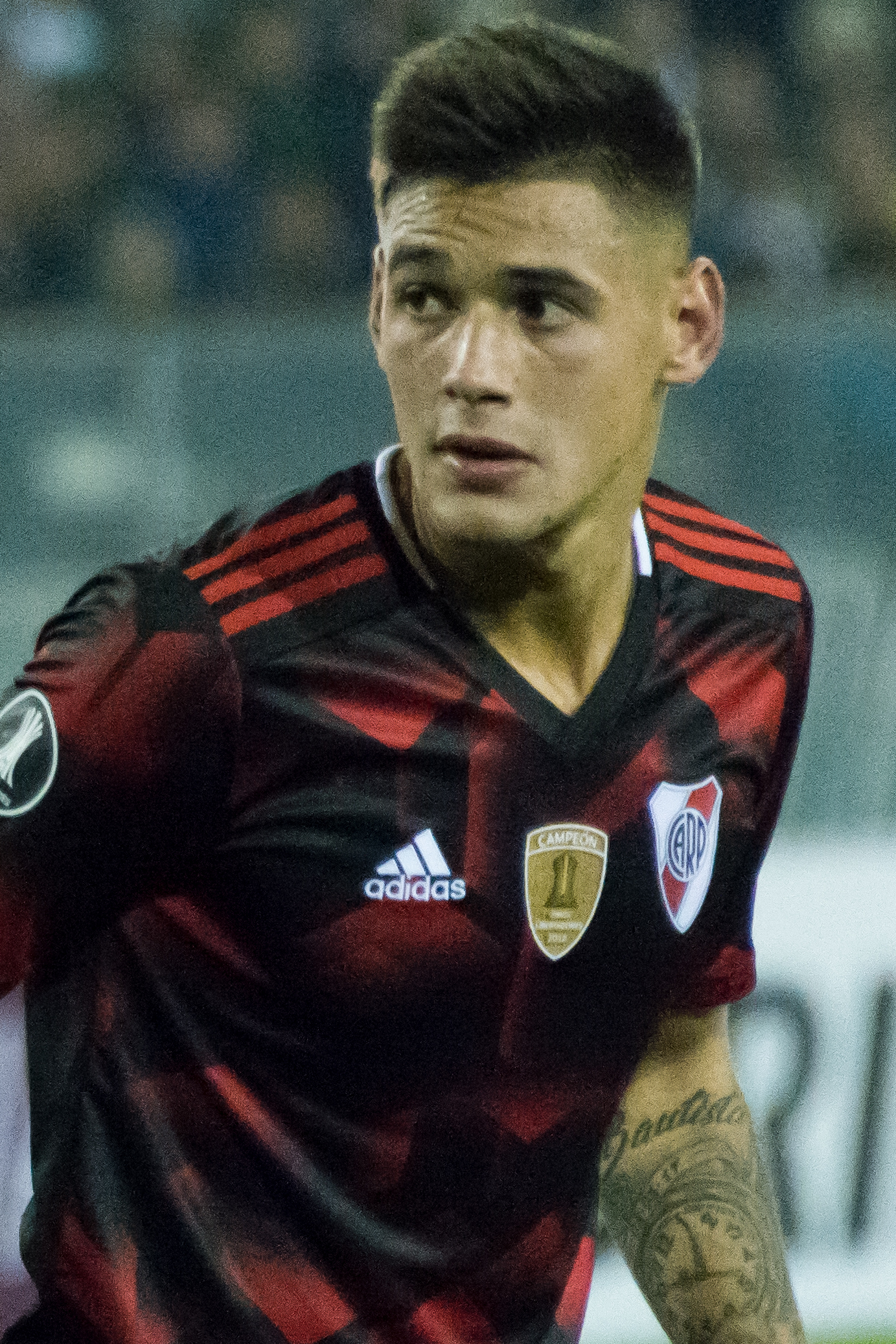
- Martínez Quarta with River Plate in 2019

Personal information
- Full name: Lucas Martínez Quarta
- Date of birth: 10 May 1996 (age 30)
- Place of birth: Mar del Plata, Argentina
- Height: 1.83 m (6 ft 0 in)
- Position: Centre-back

Team information
- Current team: River Plate
- Number: 28

Youth career
- –2012: Kimberley
- 2012–2016: River Plate

Senior career*
Years	Team	Apps	(Gls)
2016–2020	River Plate	64	(2)
2020–2025	Fiorentina	105	(9)
2025–	River Plate	44	(3)

International career^{‡}
2019–2026	Argentina	16	(0)
Medal record
Men's football
Representing Argentina
Copa América
Winner	2021 Brazil
Winner	2024 United States
- * Club domestic league appearances and goals as of 18:01, 10 July 2026 (UTC) ‡ National team caps and goals as of 31 March 2026

Lucas Martínez Quarta (born 10 May 1996) is an Argentine professional footballer who plays as a centre-back for Argentine Primera División club River Plate. He is sometimes nicknamed as Chino or MQ.

== Club career ==
On 5 October 2020, Martínez Quarta signed a five-year contract with Serie A club Fiorentina. On 7 March 2021, he scored his first goal in a 3–3 draw against Parma. On 26 October 2023, he netted his first goal in European competitions and provided an assist in a 6–0 victory over Čukarički in the Europa Conference League. On 3 June 2024, he extended his contract with the club until 2028.

On 7 January 2025, Martínez Quarta returned to River Plate, departing Fiorentina after four-and-a-half seasons.

== International career ==
On 5 September 2019, Martínez Quarta debuted for the Argentina national team in a friendly 0–0 draw against Chile, playing the full 90 minutes.

In June 2024, Martínez Quarta was included in Lionel Scaloni's final 26-man Argentina squad for the 2024 Copa América.

== Career statistics ==
=== Club ===
As of match played 19 December 2024

Appearances and goals by club, season and competition
Club	Season	League			National cup (Note: Includes Copa Argentina, Coppa Italia)		Continental		Other		Total	
Club	Season	Division	Apps	Goals	Apps	Goals	Apps	Goals	Apps	Goals	Apps	Goals
River Plate	2016–17	Argentine Primera División	19	1	2	0	4 (Note: Appearances in Copa Libertadores)	2	0	0	25	3
River Plate	2017–18	Argentine Primera División	9	0	2	1	4	0	1 (Note: Appearance in FIFA Club World Cup)	0	16	1
River Plate	2018–19	Argentine Primera División	17	1	5	0	12	1	5 (Note: Three appearances in Copa de la Superliga, two appearances in Recopa Sudamericana)	0	39	2
River Plate	2019–20	Argentine Primera División	19	0	0	0	4	0	—		23	0
River Plate	Total		64	2	9	1	24	3	6	0	103	6
Fiorentina	2020–21	Serie A	21	1	2	0	—		—		23	1
Fiorentina	2021–22	Serie A	20	1	2	0	—		—		22	1
Fiorentina	2022–23	Serie A	27	1	3	0	9 (Note: Appearances in UEFA (Europa) Conference League)	0	—		39	1
Fiorentina	2023–24	Serie A	29	5	2	1	10	2	1 (Note: Appearance in Supercoppa Italiana)	0	42	8
Fiorentina	2024–25	Serie A	8	1	1	0	7	3	—		16	4
Fiorentina	Total		105	9	10	1	26	5	1	0	142	15
Career total			169	11	19	2	50	8	7	0	245	21

=== International ===
As of match played 31 March 2026

Appearances and goals by national team and year
National team	Year	Apps	Goals
Argentina	2019	2	0
Argentina	2020	4	0
Argentina	2021	3	0
Argentina	2022	2	0
Argentina	2023	1	0
Argentina	2024	3	0
Argentina	2025	0	0
Argentina	2026	1	0
Total		16	0

== Honours ==
River Plate

- Copa Argentina: 2016, 2019
- Supercopa Argentina: 2017
- Copa Libertadores: 2018
- Recopa Sudamericana: 2019

Fiorentina

- Coppa Italia runner-up: 2022–23
- UEFA Europa Conference League runner-up: 2022–23, 2023–24

Argentina

- Copa América: 2021, 2024

Individual

- Copa Libertadores Team of the Tournament: 2019
