= Rolando Mandragora =

Italian footballer (born 1997)

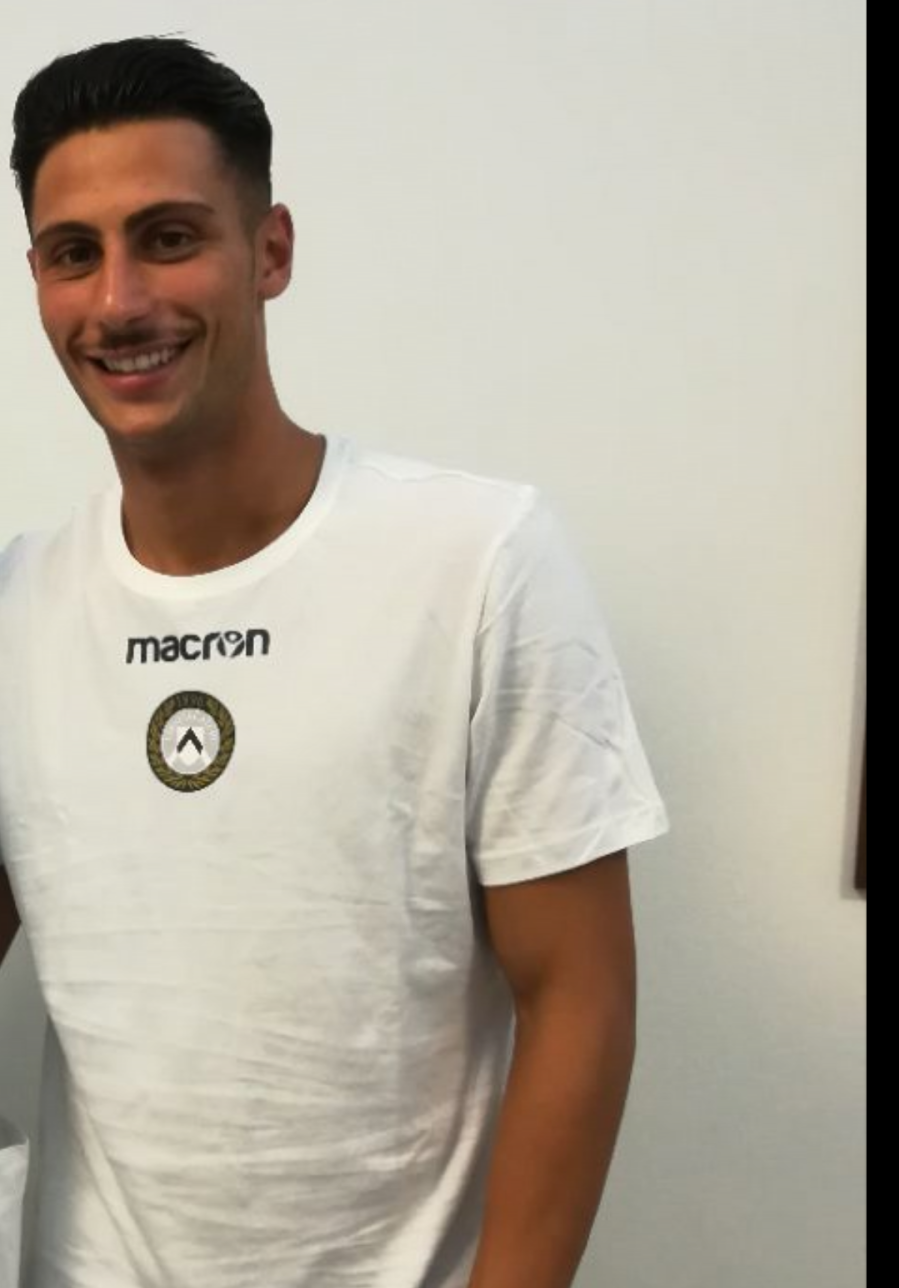
- Mandragora with Udinese in 2018

Personal information
- Date of birth: 29 June 1997 (age 29)
- Place of birth: Naples, Italy
- Height: 1.83 m (6 ft 0 in)
- Position: Defensive midfielder

Team information
- Current team: Torino
- Number: 8

Youth career
- Mariano Keller
- 2011–2016: Genoa

Senior career*
Years	Team	Apps	(Gls)
2014–2016	Genoa	5	(0)
2015–2016	→ Pescara (loan)	26	(0)
2016–2018	Juventus	1	(0)
2017–2018	→ Crotone (loan)	36	(2)
2018–2020	Udinese	61	(3)
2020–2022	Juventus	0	(0)
2020–2021	→ Udinese (loan)	10	(0)
2021–2022	→ Torino (loan)	38	(3)
2022–2026	Fiorentina	127	(16)
2026–	Torino	3	(1)

International career
2013–2014	Italy U17	4	(0)
2014	Italy U18	1	(0)
2014–2015	Italy U19	10	(1)
2017	Italy U20	7	(0)
2015–2019	Italy U21	26	(0)
2018–	Italy	1	(0)
- * Club domestic league appearances and goals as of 23:43, 19 September 2026 (UTC)

Rolando Mandragora (Italian pronunciation: [roˈlando manˈdraːɡora]; born 29 June 1997) is an Italian professional footballer who plays as a defensive midfielder for Serie A club Torino and the Italy national team.

Mandragora began his professional career at Genoa, making five Serie A appearances and playing more frequently on loan at Pescara in Serie B. In 2016 he joined Juventus, where he made a sole appearance and was loaned a year later to Crotone, where he played regularly. He signed for Udinese in 2018. He rejoined Juventus in October 2020 and was immediately loaned back to Udinese.

Mandragora represented Italy at every age group from under-17 to under-21. He made his senior international debut in June 2018.

== Club career ==
=== Early career ===
Mandragora is a native of the Naples quartiere of Scampia. His father ran the local football school established by Paolo and Fabio Cannavaro. Mandragora was scouted by Serie A clubs while at Mariano Keller and joined the youth sector of Genoa at age fourteen.

He made his Serie A debut on 29 October 2014 against Juventus in a 1–0 home win. He played the first 69 minutes of the game, before being substituted by Juraj Kucka.

=== Juventus ===
On 19 January 2016, Juventus confirmed the signing of Mandragora on a five-year contract for an initial fee of €6 million, potentially rising to €12 million based on performance. He spent the rest of the 2015–16 season on loan at Serie B side Pescara. In April 2016 he suffered a fractured metatarsal in his right foot which required surgery. His recovery was hindered due to complications and he was forced to undergo a second surgery that August.

Mandragora returned to Juventus for the 2016–17 season and was given the number 38 shirt. He made his Juventus debut on 23 April 2017, coming on as a substitute for Claudio Marchisio in the 86th minute of a 4–0 home win against his former club Genoa, in Serie A.

On 5 August 2017, Mandragora was loaned to fellow top-flight team Crotone for the season. He played all but two of their league games, starting each one as the Calabrian club suffered relegation, and contributed two goals; the first of his career was on 24 September to open a 2–0 home win over Benevento.

=== Udinese ===
On 2 July 2018, Mandragora was sold to fellow Serie A side Udinese but Juventus kept a buy-back option for €20 million.

Mandragora received a one-match retrospective ban for blasphemy from Lega Serie A in August 2018; after having a shot saved against Sampdoria he shouted insults towards the Virgin Mary and God.

On 22 December 2018, Mandragora scored his first goal for Udinese to open a 1–1 home draw with Frosinone. A week later, he was given a straight red card by the video assistant referee in a 2–0 win over Cagliari also at the Stadio Friuli.

On 23 June 2020, Mandragora sustained an anterior cruciate ligament injury during a 1–0 loss to Torino and was ruled out for over four months.

=== Return to Juventus ===
On 3 October 2020, Juventus announced that Mandragora was rejoining the club on a five-year contract for €10.7 million, while remaining with Udinese on loan for the remainder of the 2020–21 season. The deal also included an optional one-year extension of the loan and a potential €6 million extra payment to Udinese based on his performances.

==== Torino (loan) ====
On 1 February 2021, after bringing an early finish to his loan at Udinese, Mandragora joined Torino, again on loan, until June 2022. The deal included a conditional obligation to buy.

=== Fiorentina ===
On 4 July 2022, he was sold to Fiorentina.

On 29 May 2024, Mandragora started in Fiorentina's 1–0 extra-time defeat to Olympiacos in the 2024 UEFA Europa Conference League final.

== International career ==
A regular youth international, Mandragora made his debut for the Italy U21 team on 12 August 2015, in a friendly match against Hungary. He was named in the team for the 2017 FIFA U-20 World Cup in South Korea.

Mandragora made his senior international debut for Italy under Roberto Mancini, starting in a 3–1 friendly loss to France in Nice on 1 June 2018.

He took part in the 2019 UEFA European Under-21 Championship, as the team's captain.

== Career statistics ==
=== Club ===
As of match played 19 September 2026

Appearances and goals by club, season and competition
Club	Season	League			Coppa Italia		Europe		Other		Total	
Club	Season	Division	Apps	Goals	Apps	Goals	Apps	Goals	Apps	Goals	Apps	Goals
Genoa	2014–15	Serie A	5	0	0	0	—		—		5	0
Pescara (loan)	2015–16	Serie B	26	0	1	0	—		—		27	0
Juventus	2016–17	Serie A	1	0	0	0	0	0	0	0	1	0
Crotone (loan)	2017–18	Serie A	36	2	1	0	—		—		37	2
Udinese	2018–19	Serie A	35	3	1	0	—		—		36	3
Udinese	2019–20	Serie A	26	0	2	3	—		—		28	3
Udinese	Total		61	3	3	3	—		—		64	6
Udinese (loan)	2020–21	Serie A	10	0	0	0	—		—		10	0
Torino (loan)	2020–21	Serie A	17	3	0	0	—		—		17	3
Torino (loan)	2021–22	Serie A	21	0	2	1	—		—		23	1
Torino (loan)	Total		38	3	2	1	—		—		40	4
Fiorentina	2022–23	Serie A	29	2	4	0	17 (Note: Appearances in UEFA Europa Conference League)	2	—		50	4
Fiorentina	2023–24	Serie A	33	3	4	1	13	1	—		50	5
Fiorentina	2024–25	Serie A	29	4	0	0	13 (Note: Appearances in UEFA Conference League)	5	—		42	9
Fiorentina	2025–26	Serie A	34	7	0	0	13	1	—		47	8
Fiorentina	2026–27	Serie A	2	0	—		—		—		2	0
Fiorentina	Total		127	16	8	1	56	9	—		191	26
Torino	2026–27	Serie A	3	1	—		—		—		3	1
Career total			297	25	15	5	56	9	0	0	378	39

=== International ===
Appearances and goals by national team and year
National team	Year	Apps	Goals
Italy	2018	1	0
Total		1	0

== Honours ==
Juventus

- Serie A: 2016–17
- Coppa Italia: 2016–17

Fiorentina

- Coppa Italia runner-up: 2022–23
- UEFA Europa Conference League runner-up: 2022–23, 2023–24

Italy U20

- FIFA U-20 World Cup bronze medal: 2017
