= Luca Ranieri =

Italian footballer (born 1999)

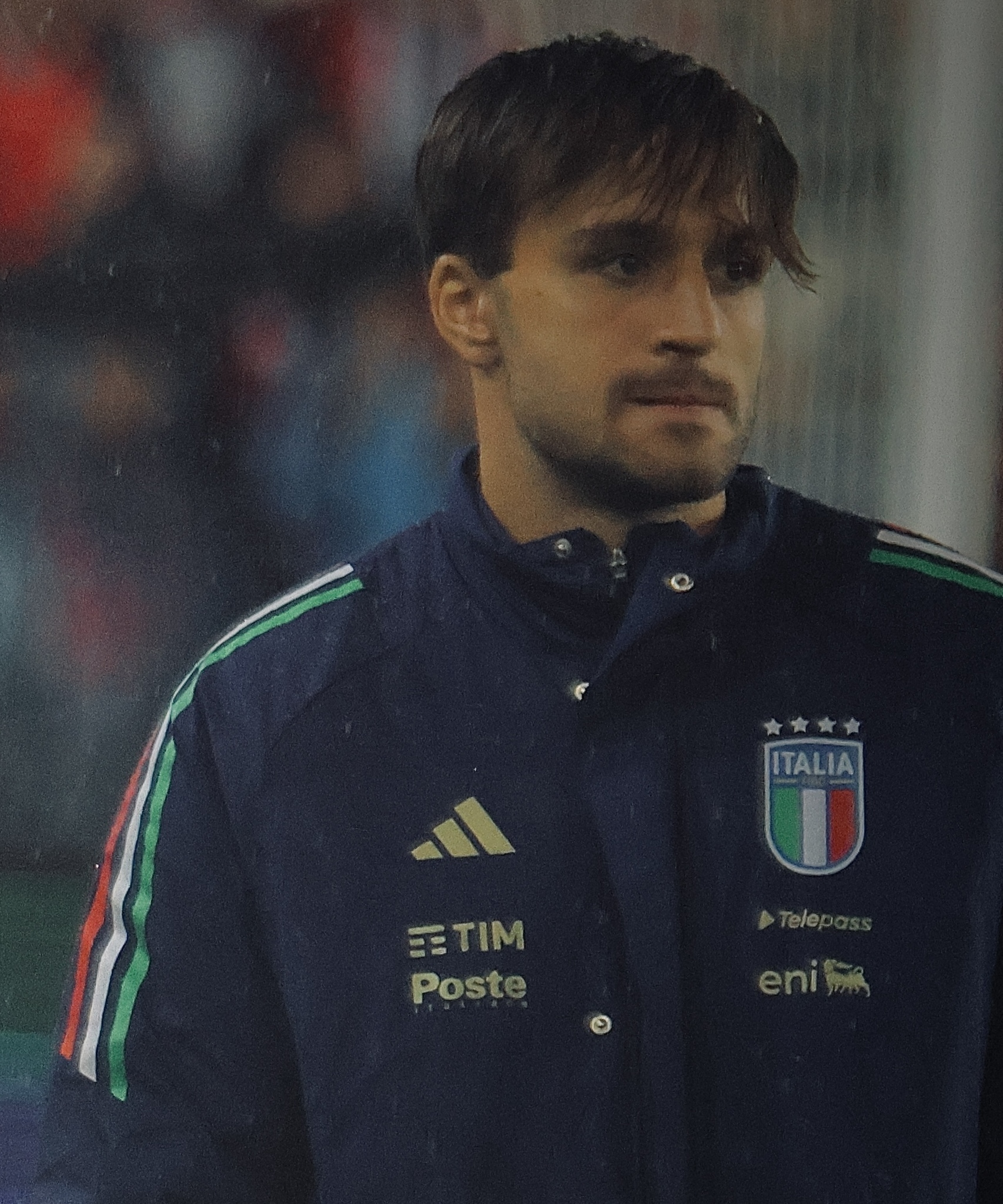
- Ranieri with Italy in 2025

Personal information
- Full name: Luca Ranieri
- Date of birth: 23 April 1999 (age 27)
- Place of birth: La Spezia, Italy
- Height: 1.87 m (6 ft 2 in)
- Position: Defender

Team information
- Current team: Fiorentina
- Number: 6

Youth career
- 2015–2018: Fiorentina

Senior career*
Years	Team	Apps	(Gls)
2018–	Fiorentina	112	(4)
2018–2019	→ Foggia (loan)	29	(0)
2020	→ Ascoli (loan)	10	(0)
2020–2021	→ SPAL (loan)	25	(0)
2021–2022	→ Salernitana (loan)	27	(1)

International career^{‡}
2014–2015	Italy U16	3	(0)
2015–2016	Italy U17	4	(0)
2016–2017	Italy U18	6	(0)
2018–2019	Italy U20	5	(0)
2019–2021	Italy U21	8	(0)
2025–	Italy	1	(0)
- * Club domestic league appearances and goals as of 17:02, 10 October 2026 (UTC) ‡ National team caps and goals as of 10 June 2025

Luca Ranieri (Italian pronunciation: [ˈlu.ka raˈnjɛ.ri]; born 23 April 1999) is an Italian professional footballer who plays as a defender for Serie A club Fiorentina, which he captains, and the Italy national team.

== Club career ==
=== Fiorentina ===
Ranieri is the product of ACF Fiorentina youth teams and started playing for their Under-19 squad in the 2015–16 season. Late in the 2017–18 Serie A season he made several bench appearances for Fiorentina's senior squad, but did not see any time on the field.

==== Loan moves ====
On 16 July 2018, Ranieri joined Serie B club Foggia on a season-long loan. On 26 August he made his professional debut in Serie B debut for Foggia as a 77th-minute substitute for Emanuele Cicerelli in a 4–2 home win over Carpi. One month later, on 27 October, Ranieri played his first match as a starter, a 2–2 home draw against Lecce, he was replaced by Giuseppe Loiacono in the 69th minute. Three days later, on 30 October, he played his first entire match for the team, a 1–1 away draw against Cittadella. Ranieri ended his season-long loan to Foggia with 29 appearances, including 26 as a starter, and 1 assist.

On 31 January 2020, after having made his Serie A debut for Fiorentina, Ranieri moved to Serie B club Ascoli on loan until the end of the season. The next day, he made his debut for the club in a 3–0 away victory against Livorno, he was replaced by Erick Ferigra in the 93rd minute. On 21 June, Ranieri played his first entire match for the club, a 1–0 home defeat against Perugia. Ranieri ended his 6-month loan to Ascoli with only ten appearances, including nine as a starter. On 25 September, he joined Serie B club SPAL on loan until 30 June 2021.

== International career ==
Ranieri first was called up to represent his country in November 2014 for Italy national under-16 football team friendlies. He was later called up for the Under-17, Under-18, and eventually Under-20 squads.

On 6 September 2019, Ranieri debuted for Italy U21 in a friendly match against Moldova. On 9 June 2025, he debuted for the Italian senior squad in a 2–0 victory of a 2026 FIFA World Cup qualification match against Moldova.

== Career statistics ==
=== Club ===
As of match played 10 October 2026

Appearances and goals by club, season and competition
Club	Season	League			Coppa Italia		Europe		Other		Total	
Club	Season	League	Apps	Goals	Apps	Goals	Apps	Goals	Apps	Goals	Apps	Goals
Foggia (loan)	2018–19	Serie B	29	0	0	0	—		—		29	0
Fiorentina	2019–20	Serie A	3	0	2	0	—		—		5	0
Fiorentina	2022–23	Serie A	9	0	3	0	7 (Note: Appearances in UEFA Europa Conference League)	0	—		19	0
Fiorentina	2023–24	Serie A	26	2	4	0	13	3	0	0	43	5
Fiorentina	2024–25	Serie A	36	1	1	0	11 (Note: Appearances in UEFA Conference League)	2	—		48	3
Fiorentina	2025–26	Serie A	34	1	1	0	10	2	—		45	3
Fiorentina	2026–27	Serie A	4	0	1	1	—		—		5	1
Fiorentina	Total		112	4	11	1	41	7	0	0	165	12
Ascoli (loan)	2019–20	Serie B	10	0	—		—		—		10	0
SPAL (loan)	2020–21	Serie B	25	0	4	0	—		—		29	0
Salernitana (loan)	2021–22	Serie A	27	1	0	0	—		—		27	1
Career total			203	5	16	1	41	7	0	0	258	13

=== International ===
As of match played 9 June 2025

Appearances and goals by national team and year
National team	Year	Apps	Goals
Italy	2025	1	0
Total		1	0

== Honours ==
Fiorentina

- Coppa Italia runner-up: 2022–23
- UEFA Europa Conference League runner-up: 2022–23 2023–24
