= 2021–22 AC Perugia Calcio season =

Perugia
2021–22 season
- President: Massimiliano Santopadre
- Head coach: Massimiliano Alvini
- Stadium: Stadio Renato Curi
- Serie B: 8th
- Coppa Italia: First round
- Top goalscorer: League: Manuel De Luca (10); All: Manuel De Luca (10)

The 2021–22 season was AC Perugia Calcio's first season back in second division of the Italian football league, the Serie B, and the 117th as a football club.

== Players ==
=== First-team quad ===
As of 17 February 2022

Note: Flags indicate national team as defined under FIFA eligibility rules; some limited exceptions apply. Players may hold more than one non-FIFA nationality.

No.	Pos.	Nation	Player
1	GK	ITA	Andrea Fulignati
2	DF	ITA	Aleandro Rosi (Captain)
4	MF	ITA	Emmanuel Gyabuaa (on loan from Atalanta)
5	DF	ITA	Gabriele Angella (Vice-captain)
6	MF	ITA	Jacopo Segre (on loan from Torino)
7	MF	ITA	Mirko Carretta
8	MF	ITA	Salvatore Burrai
9	FW	ITA	Manuel De Luca (on loan from Sampdoria)
10	MF	BRA	Ryder Matos
11	FW	ITA	Marco Olivieri (on loan from Juventus)
12	GK	ITA	Luca Moro
14	MF	ITA	Alessandro Murgia (on loan from SPAL)
15	DF	ITA	Cristian Dell'Orco

No.	Pos.	Nation	Player
16	MF	ITA	Andrea Ghion (on loan from Sassuolo)
21	DF	ARG	Marcos Curado (on loan from Genoa)
22	GK	ARG	Leandro Chichizola
23	MF	ITA	Marcello Falzerano
25	MF	ITA	Simone Santoro
28	MF	CIV	Christian Kouan
30	DF	ITA	Gabriele Ferrarini (on loan from Fiorentina)
31	GK	HUN	Gábor Megyeri
32	DF	ITA	Gianmaria Zanandrea (on loan from Mantova)
39	DF	ITA	Filippo Sgarbi
44	DF	ITA	Francesco Lisi
—	GK	ITA	Andrea Zaccagno
—	MF	ITA	Christian D'Urso (on loan from Cittadella)

=== Out on loan ===
Note: Flags indicate national team as defined under FIFA eligibility rules; some limited exceptions apply. Players may hold more than one non-FIFA nationality.

No.	Pos.	Nation	Player
—	DF	ITA	Samuele Angori (at Torino U19)
—	DF	ITA	Gianluca Di Chiara (at Reggina)
—	DF	ITA	Samuele Righetti (at Gubbio)
—	MF	ITA	Giovanni Di Noia (at Gubbio)

No.	Pos.	Nation	Player
—	FW	ITA	Alberto Lunghi (at Aquila Montevarchi)
—	FW	GAM	Kalifa Manneh (at Taranto)
—	FW	ITA	Federico Melchiorri (at SPAL)
—	FW	ITA	Michele Vano (at Pistoiese)

== Pre-season and friendlies ==
Win Draw Loss

24 July 2021 Friendly	Perugia (Italy)	6–0	(Italy) Montevarchi Aquila	Pieve Santo Stefano, Italy
17:00 CEST (UTC+2)				Stadium: Stadio Egidio Capaccini

1 August 2021 Friendly	Perugia (Italy)	2–0	(Italy) Cesena	Perugia, Italy
20:45 CEST (UTC+2)				Stadium: Stadio Renato Curi

13 November 2021 Friendly	Empoli (Italy)	1–1	(Italy) Perugia	Empoli, Italy
15:00 CET (UTC+1)	Cutrone 70'		Murano 88'	Stadium: Stadio Carlo Castellani; Referee: Adrian Lupinski

== Competitions ==
=== Overall record ===
Competition	First match	Last match	Starting round	Final position	Record							
Competition	First match	Last match	Starting round	Final position	Pld	W	D	L	GF	GA	GD	Win %
Serie B	21 August 2021	6 May 2022	Matchday 1	8th	38	14	16	8	40	32	+8	36.84
Serie B promotion play-offs	14 May 2022		Preliminary round	Preliminary round	1	0	0	1	2	3	−1	0.00
Coppa Italia	13 August 2021		First round	First round	1	0	0	1	2	3	−1	0.00
Total					40	14	16	10	44	38	+6	35.00

Source: Soccerway

=== Serie A ===
==== League table ====
Pos	Team	Pld	W	D	L	GF	GA	GD	Pts	Promotion, qualification or relegation
6	Ascoli	38	19	8	11	52	42	+10	65	Qualification for promotion play-offs preliminary round
7	Benevento	38	18	9	11	62	39	+23	63	Qualification for promotion play-offs preliminary round
8	Perugia	38	14	16	8	40	32	+8	58 (Note: Perugia finished ahead of Frosinone on head-to-head points: Frosinone 0–0 Perugia, Perugia 3–0 Frosinone.)	Qualification for promotion play-offs preliminary round
9	Frosinone	38	15	13	10	58	45	+13	58	
10	Ternana	38	15	9	14	58	61	−3	54	

Source: Lega Serie B (in Italian), Soccerway (in English)
Rules for classification: 1) Points; 2) Head-to-head points; 3) Head-to-head goal difference; 4) Goal difference; 5) Goals scored; 6) Draw.

==== Results summary ====
Overall								Home						Away					
Pld	W	D	L	GF	GA	GD	Pts	W	D	L	GF	GA	GD	W	D	L	GF	GA	GD
38	14	16	8	40	32	+8	58	6	8	5	19	16	+3	8	8	3	21	16	+5

Source: Serie B

==== Results by round ====
Round	1	2	3	4	5	6	7	8	9	10	11	12	13	14	15	16	17	18	19	20	21	22	23	24	25	26	27	28	29	30	31	32	33	34	35	36	37	38
Ground																																						
Result	W	L	D	D	W	D	D	W	D	L	W	L	W	D	D	W	D	D	D	L	W	W	W	D	W	L	L	D	W	D	L	D	D	D	W	W	L	W
Position	6	12	12	11	9	10	9	7	8	8	8	12	9	10	9	9	8	9	10	10	10	8	8	9	7	9	10	9	9	9	9	9	9	9	9	9	9	9

Source: Serie B
A = Away; H = Home; W = Win; D = Draw; L = Loss

==== Matches ====
The league fixtures were announced on 24 July 2021.

21 August 2021	Pordenone	0–1	Perugia	Pordenone
--:-- CEST (UTC+2)

28 August 2021	Perugia	2–3	Ascoli	Perugia
--:-- CEST (UTC+2)				Stadium: Stadio Renato Curi

11 September 2021	Frosinone	0–0	Perugia	Frosinone
--:-- CEST (UTC+2)

18 September 2021	Perugia	1–1	Cosenza	Perugia
--:-- CEST (UTC+2)				Stadium: Stadio Renato Curi

22 September 2021 5	Cremonese	0–3	Perugia	Cremona
20:30 CET	Castagnetti (yellow card) 5'; Vido (yellow card) 37'; Ciofani (yellow card) 54'; Deli (yellow card) 83'	Report	Lisi 14' (yellow card) 36'; Zanandrea 29' (yellow card) 31' (yellow-red card) 41'; Chichizola (yellow card) 54'; Kouan 79'	Stadium: Stadio Giovanni Zini; Attendance: 3,188; Referee: (Italy) Matteo Marchetti

26 September 2021	Perugia	1–1	Alessandria	Perugia
--:-- CEST (UTC+2)				Stadium: Stadio Renato Curi

3 October 2021	Benevento	0–0	Perugia	Benevento
--:-- CEST (UTC+2)

16 October 2021	Perugia	1–0	Brescia	Perugia
--:-- CEST (UTC+2)				Stadium: Stadio Renato Curi

23 October 2021	Lecce	0–0	Perugia	Lecce
--:-- CEST (UTC+2)

28 October 2021	Perugia	0–2	Reggina	Perugia
--:-- CEST (UTC+2)				Stadium: Stadio Renato Curi

1 November 2021	SPAL	1–2	Perugia	Ferrara
--:-- CET (UTC+1)

6 November 2021	Como	4–1	Perugia	Como
--:-- CET (UTC+1)

20 November 2021	Perugia	2–0	Crotone	Perugia
--:-- CET (UTC+1)				Stadium: Stadio Renato Curi

27 November 2021	Perugia	1–1	Cittadella	Perugia
--:-- CET (UTC+1)				Stadium: Stadio Renato Curi

30 November 2021	Pisa	1–1	Perugia	Pisa
--:-- CET (UTC+1)

3 December 2021	Perugia	1–0	Vicenza	Perugia
--:-- CET (UTC+1)				Stadium: Stadio Renato Curi

12 December 2021	Parma	1–1	Perugia	Parma
--:-- CET (UTC+1)

19 December 2021	Perugia	1–1	Ternana	Perugia
--:-- CET (UTC+1)				Stadium: Stadio Renato Curi

16 January 2022	Monza	2–2	Perugia
--:-- CET (UTC+1)

22 January 2022	Perugia	0–1	Pordenone	Perugia
--:-- CET (UTC+1)				Stadium: Stadio Renato Curi

5 February 2022	Ascoli	0–1	Perugia
--:-- CET (UTC+1)

12 February 2022	Perugia	3–0	Frosinone	Perugia
--:-- CET (UTC+1)				Stadium: Stadio Renato Curi

15 February 2022	Cosenza	1–2	Perugia
--:-- CET (UTC+1)

19 February 2022 24	Perugia	0–0	Cremonese	Perugia
16:15 CET	Burrai (yellow card) 28'; De Luca (yellow card) 78'; Dell'Orco (yellow card) 90+1'	Report	Sernicola (yellow card) 68'; Meroni (yellow card) 69'; Valeri (yellow card) 87'	Stadium: Stadio Renato Curi; Attendance: 4,521; Referee: (Italy) Ivano Pezzuto

22 February 2022	Alessandria	1–2	Perugia
--:-- CET (UTC+1)

26 February 2022	Perugia	0–1	Benevento	Perugia
--:-- CET (UTC+1)				Stadium: Stadio Renato Curi

1 March 2022	Brescia	2–1	Perugia
--:-- CET (UTC+1)

6 March 2022	Perugia	1–1	Lecce	Perugia
--:-- CET (UTC+1)				Stadium: Stadio Renato Curi

12 March 2022	Reggina	0–1	Perugia
--:-- CET (UTC+1)

16 March 2022	Perugia	1–1	SPAL	Perugia
--:-- CET (UTC+1)				Stadium: Stadio Renato Curi

20 March 2022	Perugia	0–1	Como	Perugia
--:-- CET (UTC+1)				Stadium: Stadio Renato Curi

3 April 2022	Crotone	1–1	Perugia	Crotone
--:-- CEST (UTC+2)

6 April 2022	Cittadella	0–0	Perugia	Cittadella
--:-- CEST (UTC+2)

10 April 2022	Perugia	1–1	Pisa	Perugia
--:-- CEST (UTC+2)				Stadium: Stadio Renato Curi

18 April 2022	Vicenza	1–2	Perugia	Vicenza
--:-- CEST (UTC+2)

25 April 2022	Perugia	2–1	Parma	Perugia
--:-- CEST (UTC+2)				Stadium: Stadio Renato Curi

30 April 2022	Ternana	1–0	Perugia	Terni
--:-- CEST (UTC+2)

6 May 2022	Perugia	1–0	Monza	Perugia
20:30 CEST (UTC+2)	Ferrarini 85'			Stadium: Stadio Renato Curi

=== Coppa Italia ===
13 August 2021 First round	Genoa	3–2	Perugia	Genoa
18:00 CEST (UTC+2)	Criscito 26' (pen.); Biraschi (yellow card) 38'; Chichizola 41' (o.g.); Pandev (yellow card) 56'; Kallon 88'	Report	Carretta 2'; Lisi 10'; Burrai (yellow card) 25'; Dell'Orco (yellow card) 30'; Curado (red card) 40'; Vanbaleghem (yellow card) 52'	Stadium: Stadio Luigi Ferraris; Attendance: 522; Referee: Antonio Rapuano
