= 2022–23 AC Perugia Calcio season =

Perugia
2022–23 season
- Chairman: Massimiliano Santopadre
- Head coach: Fabrizio Castori
- Stadium: Stadio Ciro Vigorito
- Serie B: 19th
- Coppa Italia: Round of 64
- Top goalscorer: League: Federico Melchiorri (3); All: Federico Melchiorri (4)

The 2022–23 season is the 118th in the history of A.C. Perugia Calcio and their second consecutive season in the top flight. The club will participate in Serie B and Coppa Italia.

== Players ==
As of 10 January 2023

Note: Flags indicate national team as defined under FIFA eligibility rules; some limited exceptions apply. Players may hold more than one non-FIFA nationality.

No.	Pos.	Nation	Player
1	GK	ITA	Stefano Gori (on loan from Juventus)
2	DF	ITA	Aleandro Rosi (Captain)
3	DF	ITA	Samuele Righetti
4	MF	ITA	Edoardo Iannoni (on loan from Salernitana)
5	DF	ITA	Gabriele Angella (Vice-captain)
6	DF	CRO	Stipe Vulikić (on loan from Hrvatski Dragovoljac)
7	MF	SRB	Miloš Vulić
9	FW	ITA	Federico Melchiorri
10	FW	BRA	Ryder Matos
11	FW	ITA	Marco Olivieri (on loan from Juventus)
12	GK	ITA	Jacopo Furlan
13	MF	ITA	Gregorio Luperini
15	DF	ITA	Cristian Dell'Orco
16	MF	ITA	Paolo Bartolomei
17	DF	COL	Yeferson Paz (on loan from Sassuolo)

No.	Pos.	Nation	Player
18	FW	ITA	Samuel Di Carmine
20	FW	ITA	Giuseppe Di Serio
21	DF	ARG	Marcos Curado
22	GK	ITA	Luca Moro
23	MF	ITA	Francesco Lisi
24	MF	ARG	Tiago Casasola
25	MF	ITA	Simone Santoro
28	MF	CIV	Christian Kouan
33	DF	ITA	Andrea Beghetto (on loan from Pisa)
49	DF	ITA	Leon Baldi
86	MF	ITA	Giovanni Giunti
92	FW	ALB	Flavio Sulejmani
95	DF	ITA	Giovanni Cicioni
97	DF	ITA	Filippo Sgarbi

=== Other players under contract ===
Note: Flags indicate national team as defined under FIFA eligibility rules; some limited exceptions apply. Players may hold more than one non-FIFA nationality.

No.	Pos.	Nation	Player
—	FW	GAM	Kalifa Manneh

=== Out on loan ===
Note: Flags indicate national team as defined under FIFA eligibility rules; some limited exceptions apply. Players may hold more than one non-FIFA nationality.

No.	Pos.	Nation	Player
—	FW	ITA	Michele Vano (at Rimini)

== Pre-season and friendlies ==
Win Draw Loss Fixtures

17 July 2022 Friendly	Napoli (Italy)	4–1	(Italy) Perugia	Dimaro Folgarida, Italy
18:00 CEST (UTC+2)	Kvaratskhelia 5'; Zambo Anguissa 36'; Rrahmani (yellow card) 44'; Politano 63'; Petagna 90+1' (pen.)		Onischenko (yellow card) 9'; Vulikić (yellow card) 32'; Melchiorri 48'	Stadium: Stadio di Carciato; Referee: Lorenzo Maggioni

30 July 2022 Friendly	Perugia (Italy)	2–0	(Italy) Rimini	Perugia, Italy
18:00 CEST (UTC+2)				Stadium: Centro Sportivo Paolo Rossi Campo 1

== Competitions ==
=== Overall record ===
Competition	First match	Last match	Starting round	Final position	Record							
Competition	First match	Last match	Starting round	Final position	Pld	W	D	L	GF	GA	GD	Win %
Serie B	12–14 August 2022	19 May 2023	Matchday 1		21	5	5	11	19	29	−10	23.81
Coppa Italia	5 August 2022		Round of 64	Round of 64	1	0	0	1	2	3	−1	0.00
Total					22	5	5	12	21	32	−11	22.73

Last updated: January 2023
Source: Soccerway

=== Serie B ===
==== League table ====
Pos	Team	Pld	W	D	L	GF	GA	GD	Pts	Promotion, qualification or relegation
16	Brescia	38	9	13	16	36	57	−21	40	Spared from relegation
17	Cosenza (O)	38	9	13	16	30	53	−23	40	Qualification for relegation play-out
18	Perugia (R)	38	10	9	19	40	52	−12	39	Relegation to Serie C
19	SPAL (R)	38	8	14	16	41	51	−10	38	Relegation to Serie C
20	Benevento (R)	38	7	14	17	33	49	−16	35	Relegation to Serie C

Source: Soccerway (in English)
Rules for classification: 1) Points; 2) Head-to-head points; 3) Head-to-head goal difference; 4) Goal difference; 5) Goals scored; 6) Draw.
(O) Play-off winners; (R) Relegated

==== Results summary ====
Overall								Home						Away					
Pld	W	D	L	GF	GA	GD	Pts	W	D	L	GF	GA	GD	W	D	L	GF	GA	GD
0	0	0	0	0	0	0	0	0	0	0	0	0	0	0	0	0	0	0	0

Last updated: January 2023.
Source: Serie B

==== Results by round ====
Round	1
Ground	
Result	
Position	

Updated to match(es) played on January 2023. Source: Serie B
A = Away; H = Home; W = Win; D = Draw; L = Loss

==== Matches ====
The league fixtures will be announced on 15 July 2022.
