= 2021–22 US Cremonese season =

Cremonese
2021–22 season
- Owner: Giovanni Arvedi
- President: Paolo Rossi
- Head coach: Fabio Pecchia
- Stadium: Stadio Giovanni Zini
- Serie B: 2nd (promoted)
- Coppa Italia: First round
- Top goalscorer: League: Cristian Buonaiuto; Daniel Ciofani (8 each); All: Cristian Buonaiuto; Daniel Ciofani (8 each)
Home colours	Away colours

The 2021–22 season was U.S. Cremonese's second consecutive season in second division of the Italian football league, the Serie B, and the 119th as a football club.

== Players ==
=== First-team squad ===
Note: Flags indicate national team as defined under FIFA eligibility rules; some limited exceptions apply. Players may hold more than one non-FIFA nationality.

No.	Pos.	Nation	Player
2	DF	ITA	Alessandro Fiordaliso
3	DF	ITA	Emanuele Valeri
6	DF	ITA	Luca Ravanelli
7	FW	URU	Jaime Báez
8	FW	CIV	Cedric Gondo
9	FW	ITA	Daniel Ciofani
10	FW	ITA	Cristian Buonaiuto
11	FW	ITA	Luca Strizzolo
12	GK	ITA	Marco Carnesecchi (on loan from Atalanta)
13	DF	ITA	Andrea Meroni (on loan from Sassuolo)
14	MF	ITA	Luca Valzania (on loan from Atalanta)
15	DF	ITA	Matteo Bianchetti
16	MF	ITA	Paolo Bartolomei
17	MF	ITA	Leonardo Sernicola (on loan from Sassuolo)

No.	Pos.	Nation	Player
19	MF	ITA	Michele Castagnetti
20	MF	ROU	Dennis Politic
21	MF	ITA	Nicolò Fagioli (on loan from Juventus)
22	GK	POL	Dorian Ciezkowski
23	DF	ITA	Alessandro Crescenzi
27	DF	FRA	Daniel Frey
29	FW	ITA	Samuel Di Carmine
32	DF	ARG	Tiago Casasola (on loan from Lazio)
45	GK	SEN	Mouhamadou Sarr
55	DF	ITA	Caleb Okoli (on loan from Atalanta)
70	MF	ITA	Gianluca Gaetano (on loan from Napoli)
98	FW	ITA	Luca Zanimacchia (on loan from Juventus)
99	MF	TUN	Hamza Rafia (on loan from Juventus)

=== Out on loan ===
Note: Flags indicate national team as defined under FIFA eligibility rules; some limited exceptions apply. Players may hold more than one non-FIFA nationality.

No.	Pos.	Nation	Player
—	DF	ITA	Luca Munaretti (at Virtus Verona until 30 June 2022)
—	DF	ITA	Emanuele Terranova (at Bari until 30 June 2022)
—	MF	ITA	Christian Acella (at Giana Erminio until 30 June 2022)
—	MF	ITA	Stefano Cella (at Virtus Verona until 30 June 2022)
—	MF	ITA	Francesco Cerretelli (at Pro Sesto until 30 June 2022)
—	MF	ITA	Riccardo Collodel (at Lucchese until 30 June 2022)

No.	Pos.	Nation	Player
—	MF	ITA	Francesco Deli (at Pordenone until 30 June 2022)
—	MF	ITA	Filippo Nardi (at Como until 30 June 2022)
—	MF	ITA	Fausto Perseu (at Olbia until 30 June 2022)
—	FW	ITA	Blue Mamona (at Fiorenzuola until 30 June 2022)
—	FW	ITA	Marco Zunno (at Fiorenzuola until 30 June 2022)

== Pre-season and friendlies ==
Win Draw Loss

24 July 2021 Friendly	Pisa (Italy)	1–1	(Italy) Cremonese	Rovetta, Italy
17:00 CEST (UTC+2)				Stadium: Centro Sportivo G. Paolo Marinoni

6 August 2021 Friendly	Spezia (Italy)	Cancelled	(Italy) Cremonese	Cles, Italy
17:00 CEST (UTC+2)				Stadium: Campo Sportivo Cles

6 August 2021 Friendly	SPAL (Italy)	1–2	(Italy) Cremonese	Ferrara, Italy
18:00 CEST (UTC+2)				Stadium: Stadio Paolo Mazza

4 September 2021 Friendly	Sassuolo (Italy)	0–2	(Italy) Cremonese	Sassuolo, Italy
17:00 CEST (UTC+2)			Di Carmine 12' (pen.); Gaetano 34'	Stadium: Stadio Enzo Ricci; Referee: Tommaso Zamagni

== Competitions ==
=== Overall record ===
Competition	First match	Last match	Starting round	Final position	Record							
Competition	First match	Last match	Starting round	Final position	Pld	W	D	L	GF	GA	GD	Win %
Serie B	22 August 2021	6 May 2022	Matchday 1	2nd	38	20	9	9	57	38	+19	52.63
Coppa Italia	15 August 2021		First round	First round	1	0	1	0	0	0	+0	0.00
Total					39	20	10	9	57	38	+19	51.28

Source: Soccerway

=== Serie B ===
==== League table ====
Pos	Team	Pld	W	D	L	GF	GA	GD	Pts	Promotion, qualification or relegation
1	Lecce (C, P)	38	19	14	5	59	31	+28	71	Promotion to Serie A
2	Cremonese (P)	38	20	9	9	57	39	+18	69	Promotion to Serie A
3	Pisa	38	18	13	7	48	35	+13	67 (Note: Pisa finished ahead of Monza on head-to-head points: Pisa 2–1 Monza, Monza 1–2 Pisa.)	Qualification for promotion play-offs semi-finals
4	Monza (O, P)	38	19	10	9	60	38	+22	67	Qualification for promotion play-offs semi-finals
5	Brescia	38	17	15	6	55	35	+20	66	Qualification for promotion play-offs preliminary round

Source: Lega Serie B (in Italian), Soccerway (in English)
Rules for classification: 1) Points; 2) Head-to-head points; 3) Head-to-head goal difference; 4) Goal difference; 5) Goals scored; 6) Draw.
(C) Champions; (O) Play-off winners; (P) Promoted

==== Results summary ====
Overall								Home						Away					
Pld	W	D	L	GF	GA	GD	Pts	W	D	L	GF	GA	GD	W	D	L	GF	GA	GD
38	20	9	9	57	39	+18	69	11	6	2	32	18	+14	9	3	7	25	21	+4

Source: Serie B

==== Results by round ====
Round	1	2	3	4	5	6	7	8	9	10	11	12	13	14	15	16	17	18	19	20	21	22	23	24	25	26	27	28	29	30	31	32	33	34	35	36	37	38
Ground	H	A	H	A	H	A	H	H	A	H	A	H	A	A	H	A	H	A	H	A	H	A	H	A	H	A	A	H	A	H	A	H	H	A	H	A	H	A
Result	W	L	W	W	L	W	W	D	L	D	D	D	W	L	D	W	W	W	W	L	W	W	W	D	D	W	D	W	L	W	W	D	W	L	W	L	L	W
Position	1	10	5	3	6	3	2	2	5	6	7	8	5	6	8	6	6	3	4	5	4	2	1	2	3	1	3	1	3	1	1	1	1	3	1	2	3	2

Source: Serie B
A = Away; H = Home; W = Win; D = Draw; L = Loss

==== Matches ====
The league fixtures were announced on 24 July 2021.

22 August 2021 1	Cremonese	3–0	Lecce	Cremona
20:30 CET	Valeri (yellow card) 31' (goal) 65'; Castagnetti (yellow card) 39'; Valzania 51'; Buonaiuto 60'; Ravanelli (yellow card) 83'	Report	Gabriel Strefezza (yellow card) 39'	Stadium: Stadio Giovanni Zini; Attendance: 2,372; Referee: (Italy) Niccolò Baroni

29 August 2021 2	Monza	1–0	Cremonese	Monza
20:30 CET	Colpani (yellow card) 45+2'; Dany Mota (yellow card) 60'; Gytkjær 65'; Caldirola (yellow card) 70'	Report	Castagnetti (yellow card) 48'; Valzania (yellow card) 59'	Stadium: U-Power Stadium; Attendance: 2,501; Referee: (Italy) Marco Piccinini

12 September 2021 3	Cremonese	2–0	Cittadella	Cremona
16:15 CET	Okoli (yellow card) 16'; Buonaiuto 21'; Báez (yellow card) 54' (yellow-red card) 56'; Vido 73'	Report	Adorni (yellow card) 51'; Mamadou Tounkara (yellow card) 90+4'	Stadium: Stadio Giovanni Zini; Attendance: 2,817; Referee: (Italy) Daniele Paterna

19 September 2021 4	Parma	1–2	Cremonese	Parma
20:30 CET	Mihăilă 69' (yellow card) 75'; Vázquez (yellow card) 72' (yellow-red card) 72'; Iacoponi (yellow card) 87'	Report	Fagioli 3'; Bianchetti (yellow card) 16'; Vido 34'; Sernicola (yellow card) 67'	Stadium: Stadio Ennio Tardini; Attendance: 5,581; Referee: (Italy) Manuel Volpi

22 September 2021 5	Cremonese	0–3	Perugia	Cremona
20:30 CET	Castagnetti (yellow card) 5'; Vido (yellow card) 37'; Ciofani (yellow card) 54'; Deli (yellow card) 83'	Report	Lisi 14' (yellow card) 36'; Zanandrea 29' (yellow card) 31' (yellow-red card) 41'; Chichizola (yellow card) 54'; Kouan 79'	Stadium: Stadio Giovanni Zini; Attendance: 3,188; Referee: (Italy) Matteo Marchetti

26 September 2021 6	Vicenza	0–1	Cremonese	Vicenza
20:30 CET	Calderoni (yellow card) 10' (yellow-red card) 42'; Diaw (yellow card) 27'; Proia (yellow card) 53'; Pasini (yellow card) 54'; Giacomelli (yellow card) 71'; Dalmonte (yellow card) 80'; Brosco (yellow card) 90+2'	Report	Ciofani 44' (pen.); Zanimacchia (yellow card) 48'; Okoli (yellow card) 49'; Valzania (yellow card) 78'	Stadium: Stadio Romeo Menti; Attendance: 2,927; Referee: (Italy) Antonio Santoro

2 October 2021 7	Cremonese	2–0	Ternana	Cremona
14:00 CET	Fagioli (yellow card) 30'; Zanimacchia 44'; Di Carmine 73'; Gaetano (yellow card) 89'	Report	Proietti (yellow card) 52'; Capuano (yellow card) 60'	Stadium: Stadio Giovanni Zini; Attendance: 2,813; Referee: (Italy) Francesco Cosso

17 October 2021 8	Cremonese	1–1	Benevento	Cremona
14:00 CET	Valzania (yellow card) 24'; Fagioli 46'	Report	Tello 21'; Viviani (yellow card) 26'; Letizia (yellow card) 42'	Stadium: Stadio Giovanni Zini; Attendance: 4,302; Referee: (Italy) Matteo Marcenaro

23 October 2021 9	Brescia	1–0	Cremonese	Brescia
18:30 CET	Cistana (yellow card) 57'; Špalek 84'	Report	Bianchetti (yellow card) 35'	Stadium: Stadio Mario Rigamonti; Attendance: 6,500; Referee: (Italy) Gianluca Aureliano

28 October 2021 10	Cremonese	1–1	Pisa	Cremona
20:30 CET	Ciofani 90+3'	Report	De Vitis (yellow card) 14'; Birindelli (yellow card) 26'; Beruatto 34'; Marin (yellow card) 52'; Sibilli (yellow card) 57'	Stadium: Stadio Giovanni Zini; Attendance: 5,543; Referee: (Italy) Daniele Orsato

1 November 2021 11	Pordenone	2–2	Cremonese	Lignano Sabbiadoro
18:00 CET	Falasco (yellow card) 18'; Camporese 20'; Tsadjout (yellow card) 47'; Zammarini 90+2'	Report	Okoli (yellow card) 10'; Zanimacchia 24'; Strizzolo 26'; Castagnetti (yellow card) 72'	Stadium: Stadio Guido Teghil; Attendance: 917; Referee: (Italy) Lorenzo Maggioni

6 November 2021 12	Cremonese	1–1	SPAL	Cremona
14:00 CET	Gaetano (yellow card) 2'; Strizzolo (yellow card) 26'; Buonaiuto 33'; Valeri (yellow card) 77'; Zanimacchia (yellow card) 83'	Report	Mora (yellow card) 15'; Melchiorri 44'; Viviani (yellow card) 48'	Stadium: Stadio Giovanni Zini; Attendance: 4,018; Referee: (Italy) Andrea Colombo

21 November 2021 13	Reggina	1–2	Cremonese	Reggio Calabria
14:00 CET	Cionek (yellow card) 20'; Montalto 30' (yellow card) 51'; Rivas (yellow card) 75'	Report	Sernicola (yellow card) 28'; Buonaiuto 56'; Gaetano 63'	Stadium: Stadio Oreste Granillo; Attendance: 6,335; Referee: (Italy) Livio Marinelli

27 November 2021 14	Alessandria	1–0	Cremonese	Alessandria
14:00 CET	Parodi (yellow card) 6'; Arrighini (yellow card) 44'; Mustacchio 49'; Corazza (yellow card) 63'; Chiarello (yellow card) 75'; Benedetti (yellow card) 87'	Report	Valeri (yellow card) 27'	Stadium: Stadio Giuseppe Moccagatta; Attendance: 2,290; Referee: (Italy) Manuel Volpi

30 November 2021 15	Cremonese	1–1	Frosinone	Cremona
18:00 CET	Strizzolo (yellow card) 10'; Castagnetti (yellow card) 30'; Ciofani 55'	Report	Cotali (yellow card) 23'; Charpentier 58'; Zampano (yellow card) 89'	Stadium: Stadio Giovanni Zini; Attendance: 2,096; Referee: (Italy) Giacomo Camplone

4 December 2021 16	Cosenza	0–2	Cremonese	Cosenza
14:00 CET	Carraro (yellow card) 47'; Rigione (yellow card) 66'	Report	Strizzolo 34'; Crescenzi (yellow card) 38'; Valeri 52' (yellow card) 78'	Stadium: Stadio San Vito-Gigi Marulla; Attendance: 2,728; Referee: (Italy) Lorenzo Maggioni

10 December 2021 17	Cremonese	3–2	Crotone	Cremona
18:00 CET	Fagioli 39'; Strizzolo 51'; Sernicola (yellow card) 60'; Zanimacchia 73'; Deli (yellow card) 90+2'	Report	Marić 4'; Nedelcearu (yellow card) 33'; Ahmad Benali 83' (pen.)	Stadium: Stadio Giovanni Zini; Attendance: 1,495; Referee: (Italy) Matteo Marcenaro

18 December 2021 18	Ascoli	1–4	Cremonese	Ascoli Piceno
14:00 CET	Eric Botteghin (yellow card) 22' (yellow-red card) 51'; Eramo 44' (yellow card) 74'; Dionisi (yellow card) 55'; Leali (yellow card) 71'	Report	Sernicola (yellow card) 8'; Valeri 31'; Buonaiuto 39'; Fagioli (yellow card) 42'; Castagnetti (yellow card) 57'; Di Carmine 70'; Vido (yellow card) 74' (goal) 90+1'	Stadium: Stadio Cino e Lillo Del Duca; Attendance: 3,115; Referee: (Italy) Luca Zufferli

15 January 2022 19	Cremonese	2–0	Como	Cremona
14:00 CET	Buonaiuto 4'; Okoli (yellow card) 28'; Gaetano (yellow card) 35'; Castagnetti (yellow card) 68'; Báez 75'	Report	Vignali (yellow card) 32' (yellow-red card) 57'; Parigini (yellow card) 48'	Stadium: Stadio Giovanni Zini; Attendance: 1,580; Referee: (Italy) Matteo Gariglio

23 January 2022 20	Lecce	2–1	Cremonese	Lecce
18:30 CET	Gabriel Strefezza (yellow card) 6'; Gallo 14'; Dermaku (yellow card) 52'; Lucioni (yellow card) 58'; Okoli 90+1' (o.g.)	Report	Valeri (yellow card) 11'; Ciofani 15'; Valzania (yellow card) 21'; Strizzolo (yellow card) 90+4'	Stadium: Stadio Via del mare Attendance: 3,080; Referee: (Italy) Daniele Chiffi

6 February 2022 21	Cremonese	3–2	Monza	Cremona
16:15 CET	Bianchetti (yellow card) 16'; Sernicola (yellow card) 30'; Gaetano 33'; Casasola (yellow card) 44'; Ciofani 46' 64'; Okoli (yellow card) 76'	Report	Bettella (yellow card) 22'; D'Alessandro 54'; Carlos Augusto (yellow card) 59'; Ciurria 84'; Marrone (yellow card) 90+1'	Stadium: Stadio Giovanni Zini; Attendance: 4,062; Referee: (Italy) Davide Massa

12 February 2022 22	Cittadella	0–2	Cremonese	Cittadella
14:00 CET	Mattioli (yellow card) 45+1'; Antonucci (yellow card) 45+3'; Del Fabro (yellow card) 46'; Mamadou Tounkara (yellow card) 64' (yellow-red card) 73'; Vita (yellow card) 76'	Report	Casasola 22'; Buonaiuto 54'; Castagnetti (yellow card) 62'; Bianchetti (yellow card) 88'	Stadium: Stadio Pier Cesare Tombolato; Attendance: 1,526; Referee: (Italy) Daniele Minelli

15 February 2022 23	Cremonese	3–1	Parma	Cremona
18:30 CET	Fagioli (yellow card) 15'; Báez 20'; Gondo 56'; Zanimacchia 59'	Report	Coulibaly (yellow card) 16'; Adrián Bernabé (yellow card) 35'; Sohm (yellow card) 38'; Simy 61'; Brunetta (yellow card) 78'	Stadium: Stadio Giovanni Zini; Attendance: 4,847; Referee: (Italy) Francesco Cosso

19 February 2022 24	Perugia	0–0	Cremonese	Perugia
16:15 CET	Burrai (yellow card) 28'; De Luca (yellow card) 78'; Dell'Orco (yellow card) 90+1'	Report	Sernicola (yellow card) 68'; Meroni (yellow card) 69'; Valeri (yellow card) 87'	Stadium: Stadio Renato Curi; Attendance: 4,521; Referee: (Italy) Ivano Pezzuto

22 February 2022 25	Cremonese	0–0	Vicenza	Cremona
18:30 CET	Rafia (yellow card) 39'; Politic (yellow card) 89'	Report	Sandon (yellow card) 58'; Diaw (yellow card) 87' (red card) 90+9'; Bruscagin (yellow card) 90+2'	Stadium: Stadio Giovanni Zini; Attendance: 3,207; Referee: (Italy) Andrea Colombo

26 February 2022 26	Ternana	1–2	Cremonese	Terni
14:00 CET	Partipilo (yellow card) 23'; Mazzocchi 62'; Salzano (yellow card) 81'	Report	Castagnetti (yellow card) 27'; Fagioli (yellow card) 58'; Báez 59' (yellow card) 64'; Gaetano 80'	Stadium: Stadio Libero Liberati; Attendance: 2,022; Referee: (Italy) Antonio Giua

1 March 2022 27	Benevento	1–1	Cremonese	Benevento
18:30 CET	Improta 33'; Foulon (yellow card) 61'	Report	Báez 36'; Okoli (yellow card) 44'; Sernicola (yellow card) 85'	Stadium: Stadio Ciro Vigorito; Attendance: 3,099; Referee: (Italy) Daniele Minelli

5 March 2022 28	Cremonese	2–1	Brescia	Cremona
16:15 CET	Gaetano 31'; Di Carmine (yellow card) 82' (goal) 87'; Gondo (yellow card) 90+1'	Report	Cistana 23'; van de Looi (yellow card) 29'; Léris (yellow card) 70'	Stadium: Stadio Giovanni Zini; Attendance: 9,098; Referee: (Italy) Giovanni Ayroldi

13 March 2022 29	Pisa	3–0	Cremonese	Pisa
15:30 CET	Torregrossa 9' (pen.) 50'; Marin (yellow card) 34'; Birindelli (yellow card) 40'; Sibilli (yellow card) 69'; Nagy (yellow card) 72'; Pușcaș 89'	Report	Okoli (yellow card) 14'; Valeri (yellow card) 60'; Báez (yellow card) 65'	Stadium: Arena Garibaldi – Stadio Romeo Anconetani; Attendance: 7,374; Referee: (Italy) Alessandro Prontera

16 March 2022 30	Cremonese	2–1	Pordenone	Cremona
18:30 CET	Valzania (yellow card) 51'; Zanimacchia 68' 80'; Di Carmine (red card) 86'; Gaetano (yellow card) 88'; Ciofani (yellow card) 90+2'	Report	Bassoli (yellow card) 35'; Cambiaghi 61'	Stadium: Stadio Giovanni Zini; Attendance: 3,474; Referee: (Italy) Francesco Meraviglia

20 March 2022 31	SPAL	0–2	Cremonese	Ferrara
16:15 CET	Meccariello (yellow card) 90+2'	Report	Ciofani 4' (pen.); Zanimacchia 65' (yellow card) 68'	Stadium: Stadio Paolo Mazza; Attendance: 4,961; Referee: (Italy) Luca Pairetto

=== Coppa Italia ===
15 August 2021 First round	Torino	0–0 (a.e.t.) (4–1 p)	Cremonese	Turin
21:00 CEST (UTC+2)	Rodriguez (yellow card) 20'; Lukić (yellow card) 62'; Rauti (yellow card) 90+5'; Mandragora (penalty missed) 116'	Report	Báez (yellow card) 10' (yellow-red card) 63'; Bartolomei (yellow card) 29'; Carnesecchi (yellow card) 101'	Stadium: Stadio Olimpico Grande Torino; Attendance: 1,484; Referee: Giovanni Ayroldi
	Penalties
	Mandragora (penalty scored); Verdi (penalty scored); Rauti (penalty scored); Aina (penalty scored)		(penalty missed) Ciofani; (penalty scored) Vido; (penalty missed) Castagnetti
