= 2023–24 ACF Fiorentina season =

Fiorentina
2023–24 season
- Owner: Mediacom
- Chairman: Rocco B. Commisso
- Head coach: Vincenzo Italiano
- Stadium: Stadio Artemio Franchi
- Serie A: 8th
- Coppa Italia: Semi-finals
- Supercoppa Italiana: Semi-finals
- UEFA Europa Conference League: Runners-up
- Top goalscorer: League: Nico González (12); All: Nico González (16)
- Average home league attendance: 28,807
Home colours	Away colours	Third colours

The 2023–24 season was the 97th season in the history of ACF Fiorentina and their 20th consecutive season in the top flight. The club participated in Serie A, the Coppa Italia, the newly-expanded Supercoppa Italiana, and the UEFA Europa Conference League.

Although Fiorentina did not originally qualify for any European competition based on results from their previous season, UEFA announced in late July 2023 the suspension of Juventus from any UEFA club competitions for 2023–24, allowing Fiorentina, as the next-highest ranked team in Serie A, to take their spot in the 2023–24 UEFA Europa Conference League. The Viola would reach the final of the Conference League for the second consecutive season, but were once again defeated there, this time by Greek side Olympiacos.

== Players ==
As of 30 June 2024

No.	Player	Nat.	Position(s)	Date of birth (age)	Signed from	Signed in	Contract ends	Apps.	Goals	Notes
Goalkeepers
1	Pietro Terracciano	(Italy)	GK	8 March 1990 (aged 34)	(Italy) Empoli	2019	2025	146	0	
30	Tommaso Martinelli	(Italy)	GK	6 January 2006 (aged 18)	(Italy) Youth Sector	2022	2026	1	0	
40	Tommaso Vannucchi	(Italy)	GK	5 March 2007 (aged 17)	(Italy) Youth Sector	2023	2025	0	0	
53	Oliver Christensen	(Denmark)	GK	22 March 1999 (aged 25)	(Germany) Hertha BSC	2023	2028	10	0	
Defenders
2	Dodô	(Brazil)	RB	17 November 1998 (aged 25)	(Ukraine) Shakhtar Donetsk	2022	2027	67	1	
3	Cristiano Biraghi	(Italy)	LB	1 September 1992 (aged 31)	(Italy) Pescara	2017	2026	253	14	
4	Nikola Milenković	(Serbia)	CB / RB	12 October 1997 (aged 26)	(Serbia) Partizan	2017	2027	264	17	
16	Luca Ranieri	(Italy)	CB / LB / LM	23 April 1999 (aged 25)	(Italy) Youth Sector	2015	2026	67	5	
22	Davide Faraoni	(Italy)	RB	25 October 1991 (aged 32)	(Italy) Hellas Verona	2024	2024	11	0	On loan
28	Lucas Martínez Quarta	(Argentina)	CB	10 May 1996 (aged 28)	(Argentina) River Plate	2020	2025	126	11	
33	Michael Kayode	(Italy)	RB	10 July 2004 (aged 19)	(Italy) Youth Sector	2021	2025	37	1	
37	Pietro Comuzzo	(Italy)	CB	20 February 2005 (aged 19)	(Italy) Youth Sector	2022	2025	6	0	
65	Fabiano Parisi	(Italy)	LB	9 November 2000 (aged 23)	(Italy) Empoli	2023	2028	32	0	
Midfielders
5	Giacomo Bonaventura	(Italy)	CM / AM / LW	22 August 1989 (aged 34)	(Italy) Milan	2020	2024	162	22	
6	Arthur	(Brazil)	CM / DM	12 August 1996 (aged 27)	(Italy) Juventus	2023	2024	48	2	On loan
8	Maxime Lopez	(France)	DM	4 December 1997 (aged 26)	(Italy) Sassuolo	2023	2024	31	1	On loan
17	Gaetano Castrovilli	(Italy)	CM	17 February 1997 (aged 27)	(Italy) Bari	2017	2024	131	14	
19	Gino Infantino	(Argentina)	AM	19 May 2003 (aged 21)	(Argentina) Rosario Central	2023	2028	9	0	
32	Alfred Duncan	(Ghana)	CM / DM	10 March 1993 (aged 31)	(Italy) Sassuolo	2020	2024	126	6	
38	Rolando Mandragora	(Italy)	CM / DM	29 June 1997 (aged 27)	(Italy) Juventus	2022	2026	99	9	
72	Antonín Barák	(Czech Republic)	CM	3 December 1994 (aged 29)	(Italy) Hellas Verona	2023	2027	81	13	
Forwards
7	Riccardo Sottil	(Italy)	LW / RW / CF	3 June 1999 (aged 25)	(Italy) Youth Sector	2018	2026	113	9	
9	Lucas Beltrán	(Argentina)	CF	29 March 2001 (aged 23)	(Argentina) River Plate	2023	2028	51	10	
10	Nicolás González	(Argentina)	LW / RW / CF	6 April 1998 (aged 26)	(Germany) VfB Stuttgart	2021	2026	125	38	
11	Jonathan Ikoné	(France)	RW	2 May 1998 (aged 26)	(France) Lille	2022	2026	115	12	
18	M'Bala Nzola	(Angola)	CF	18 August 1996 (aged 27)	(Italy) Spezia Calcio	2023	2027	47	7	
20	Andrea Belotti	(Italy)	CF	20 December 1993 (aged 30)	(Italy) Roma	2024	2024	24	4	On loan
99	Christian Kouamé	(Ivory Coast)	CF	6 December 1997 (aged 26)	(Italy) Genoa	2020	2024	124	10	
Players that left the club during the season
26	Yerry Mina	(Colombia)	CB	23 September 1994 (aged 28)	(England) Everton	2023	2024	7	0	
27	Abdelhamid Sabiri	(Morocco)	AM	28 November 1996 (aged 26)	(Italy) Sampdoria	2023	2026	0	0	
70	Niccolò Pierozzi	(Italy)	RB	12 September 2001 (aged 22)	(Italy) Youth Sector	2021	2024	2	0	
73	Lorenzo Amatucci	(Italy)	CM / DM	5 February 2004 (aged 19)	(Italy) Youth Sector	2021	2025	2	0	
77	Josip Brekalo	(Croatia)	LW / RW / CF	23 June 1998 (aged 25)	(Germany) VfL Wolfsburg	2023	2026	29	1	
91	Aleksandr Kokorin	(Russia)	CF / RW	19 March 1991 (aged 32)	(Russia) Spartak Moscow	2021	2024	12	0	

== Transfers ==
=== In ===
Date	Pos.	Player	Age	Moving from	Fee	Source
14 July 2023	DF	(Italy) Fabiano Parisi	22	(Italy) Empoli	€10M	
3 August 2023	MF	(Argentina) Gino Infantino	20	(Argentina) Rosario Central	€3.5M	
5 August 2023	DF	(Colombia) Yerry Mina	28	(England) Everton	Free	
10 August 2023	GK	(Denmark) Oliver Christensen	24	(Germany) Hertha BSC	€6M	
10 August 2023	FW	(Angola) M'Bala Nzola	26	(Italy) Spezia	€10M	
12 August 2023	FW	(Argentina) Lucas Beltrán	22	(Argentina) River Plate	€12M	

==== Loans in ====
Date	Pos.	Player	Age	Moving from	Fee	Notes
22 July 2023	MF	(Brazil) Arthur	26	(Italy) Juventus	€2M	
1 September 2023	MF	(France) Maxime Lopez	25	(Italy) Sassuolo		
13 January 2024	DF	(Italy) Davide Faraoni	32	(Italy) Hellas Verona		
1 February 2024	FW	(Italy) Andrea Belotti	30	(Italy) Roma		

=== Out ===
Date	Pos.	Player	Age	Moving to	Fee	Notes
1 July 2023	GK	(Italy) Salvatore Sirigu	36	Unattached	Free	
1 July 2023	DF	(Italy) Lorenzo Venuti	28	(Italy) Lecce	Free	
1 July 2023	MF	(Italy) Riccardo Saponara	31	(Italy) Hellas Verona	Free	
1 July 2023	MF	(Morocco) Youssef Maleh	24	(Italy) Lecce	€5.5M	
1 July 2023	MF	(Poland) Szymon Żurkowski	25	(Italy) Spezia	€3.2M	
12 July 2023	MF	(Croatia) Toni Fruk	22	(Croatia) Rijeka	Free	
14 July 2023	DF	(Denmark) Jacob Rasmussen	26	(Denmark) Brøndby	€3M	
23 July 2023	DF	(Serbia) Aleksa Terzić	23	(Austria) Red Bull Salzburg	€5.5M	
26 July 2023	DF	(Brazil) Igor	25	(England) Brighton & Hove Albion	€17M	
10 August 2023	FW	(Brazil) Arthur Cabral	25	(Portugal) Benfica	€20M	
14 August 2023	GK	(Italy) Michele Cerofolini	24	(Italy) Frosinone	Undisclosed	
1 September 2023	FW	(Serbia) Luka Jović	25	(Italy) Milan	Free	
1 February 2024	DF	(Colombia) Yerry Mina	29	(Italy) Cagliari	Free	

==== Loans out ====
Date	Pos.	Player	Age	Moving to	Fee	Notes
12 July 2023	DF	(Bulgaria) Dimo Krastev	20	(Italy) Catanzaro		
13 July 2023	MF	(Italy) Alessandro Bianco	20	(Italy) Reggiana		
19 July 2023	DF	(Romania) Eduard Duțu	22	(Italy) Ancona		
21 July 2023	DF	(Italy) Gabriele Ferrarini	23	(Italy) Feralpisalò		
27 July 2023	MF	(Italy) Edoardo Pierozzi	21	(Italy) Cesena		
4 August 2023	FW	(Albania) Eljon Toçi	20	(Italy) Sestri Levante		
9 August 2023	FW	(Italy) Filippo Distefano	19	(Italy) Ternana		
18 August 2023	FW	(Romania) Louis Munteanu	21	(Romania) Farul Constanța		
1 September 2023	MF	(Morocco) Sofyan Amrabat	27	(England) Manchester United	€10M	
5 September 2023	FW	(Russia) Aleksandr Kokorin	32	(Cyprus) Aris Limassol	€0.25M	Loan extended
7 September 2023	MF	(Morocco) Abdelhamid Sabiri	26	(Saudi Arabia) Al-Fayha		
4 January 2024	DF	(Romania) Eduard Duțu	22	(Italy) Virtus Francavilla		
11 January 2024	DF	(Italy) Niccolò Pierozzi	22	(Italy) Salernitana		
12 January 2024	FW	(Albania) Eljon Toçi	21	(Italy) Pro Sesto		
24 January 2024	DF	(Bulgaria) Dimo Krastev	20	(Italy) Feralpisalò		
29 January 2024	MF	(Croatia) Josip Brekalo	25	(Croatia) Hajduk Split	€0.1M	
31 January 2024	DF	(Italy) Christian Dalle Mura	21	(Italy) Ternana		
1 February 2024	MF	(Italy) Lorenzo Amatucci	19	(Italy) Ternana		

== Pre-season and friendlies ==
Win Draw Loss Fixtures

20 July 2023 Friendly	Fiorentina (Italy)	1–1	(Italy) Parma	Bagno a Ripoli
20:00 CEST (UTC+2)	Cabral 45'		Estévez 10'	Stadium: Viola Park

== Competitions ==
=== Overall record ===
Competition	First match	Last match	Starting round	Final position	Record							
Competition	First match	Last match	Starting round	Final position	Pld	W	D	L	GF	GA	GD	Win %
Serie A	19 August 2023	2 June 2024	Matchday 1	8th	38	17	9	12	61	46	+15	44.74
Coppa Italia	6 December 2023	24 April 2024	Round of 16	Semi-finals	4	1	2	1	4	6	−2	25.00
Supercoppa Italiana	18 January 2024		Semi-finals	Semi-finals	1	0	0	1	0	3	−3	0.00
UEFA Europa Conference League	24 August 2023	29 May 2024	Play-off round	Runners-up	15	7	6	2	27	15	+12	46.67
Total					58	25	17	16	92	70	+22	43.10

Source: Soccerway

=== Serie A ===
==== League table ====
Pos	Team	Pld	W	D	L	GF	GA	GD	Pts	Qualification or relegation
6	Roma	38	18	9	11	65	46	+19	63	Qualification for the Europa League league phase (Note: Since the winners of the 2023–24 Coppa Italia, Juventus, qualified for the Champions League, the Europa League berth awarded to the Coppa Italia winners was passed to the seventh-placed team, and the Conference League berth was passed to the eighth-placed team.)
7	Lazio	38	18	7	13	49	39	+10	61	Qualification for the Europa League league phase
8	Fiorentina	38	17	9	12	61	46	+15	60	Qualification for the Conference League play-off round
9	Torino	38	13	14	11	36	36	0	53 (Note: Torino finished ahead of Napoli on head-to-head points: Torino 3–0 Napoli, Napoli 1–1 Torino.)	
10	Napoli	38	13	14	11	55	48	+7	53	

Source: Serie A
Rules for classification: 1) Points; 2) Tiebreaker for Champions team and third relegated team; 3) Head-to-head points; 4) Head-to-head goal difference; 5) Goal difference; 6) Goals scored; 7) Draw.
(Note: Head-to-head record is used only after all the matches between the teams in question have been played)

==== Results summary ====
Overall								Home						Away					
Pld	W	D	L	GF	GA	GD	Pts	W	D	L	GF	GA	GD	W	D	L	GF	GA	GD
38	17	9	12	61	46	+15	60	10	5	4	37	22	+15	7	4	8	24	24	0

Source: Serie A

==== Results by round ====
Round	1	2	3	4	5	6	7	8	9	10	11	12	13	14	15	16	17	18	19	20	21	22	23	24	25	26	27	28	29	30	31	32	33	34	35	36	37	38
Ground	A	H	A	H	A	A	H	A	H	A	H	H	A	H	A	H	A	H	A	H	A	H	A	H	A	H	A	H	A	H	A	H	A	H	A	H	H	A
Result	W	D	L	W	W	D	W	W	L	L	L	W	L	W	D	W	W	W	L	D	L	L	L	W	D	W	D	D	W	L	L	D	W	W	L	W	D	W
Position	1	5	8	8	5	7	5	4	5	6	8	6	8	6	7	6	5	4	4	4	4	6	8	7	7	7	8	8	8	10	10	10	9	9	9	8	8	8

Source: Serie A
A = Away; H = Home; W = Win; D = Draw; L = Loss

==== Matches ====
The league fixtures were announced on 5 July 2023.

19 August 2023 1	Genoa	1–4	Fiorentina	Genoa
20:45 CEST (UTC+2)	Retegui (yellow card) 21'; Biraschi 58'; Bani (yellow card) 80'	Report	Biraghi 5', (yellow card) 22'; Bonaventura 11', (yellow card) 34'; González 40'; Mandragora 56'; Milenković (yellow card) 87'	Stadium: Stadio Luigi Ferraris; Attendance: 33,045; Referee: Giovanni Ayroldi

27 August 2023 2	Fiorentina	2–2	Lecce	Florence
18:30 CEST (UTC+2)	González 3'; Duncan 25'; Martínez Quarta (yellow card) 59'	Report	Pongračić (yellow card) 15'; Rafia 49'; Gendrey (yellow card) 54'; Dorgu (yellow card) 63'; Krstović 76'	Stadium: Stadio Artemio Franchi; Attendance: 34,604; Referee: Maria Sole Ferrieri Caputi

3 September 2023 3	Internazionale	4–0	Fiorentina	Milan
18:30 CEST (UTC+2)	Thuram 23'; Barella (yellow card) 45+6'; Martínez 53', 73'; Çalhanoğlu 58' (pen.)	Report	Ranieri (yellow card) 39'	Stadium: San Siro; Attendance: 72,739; Referee: Matteo Marchetti

17 September 2023 4	Fiorentina	3–2	Atalanta	Florence
18:00 CEST (UTC+2)	Bonaventura 35'; Martínez Quarta 45'; Kouamé 76'; Parisi (yellow card) 87'	Report	Koopmeiners 20'; De Roon (yellow card) 34'; Lookman 53'; Zortea (yellow card) 65'	Stadium: Stadio Artemio Franchi; Attendance: 32,100; Referee: Luca Pairetto

24 September 2023 5	Udinese	0–2	Fiorentina	Udine
15:00 CEST (UTC+2)		Report	Martínez Quarta 32'; Ranieri (yellow card) 39'; Bonaventura 90+3'	Stadium: Stadio Friuli; Attendance: 21,229; Referee: Daniele Chiffi

28 September 2023 6	Frosinone	1–1	Fiorentina	Frosinone
18:30 CEST (UTC+2)	Mazzitelli (yellow card) 51'; Okoli (yellow card) 64'; Soulé 70'; Oyono (yellow card) 87'	Report	González 19'; Milenković (yellow card) 22'; Parisi (yellow card) 69'; Mandragora (yellow card) 90+2'	Stadium: Stadio Benito Stirpe; Attendance: 14,755; Referee: Francesco Fourneau

2 October 2023 7	Fiorentina	3–0	Cagliari	Florence
20:45 CEST (UTC+2)	González 3'; Dossena 21' (o.g.); Infantino (yellow card) 86'; Nzola 90+4'	Report	Pavoletti (yellow card) 90+2'	Stadium: Stadio Artemio Franchi; Attendance: 27,309; Referee: Marco Di Bello

8 October 2023 8	Napoli	1–3	Fiorentina	Naples
20:45 CEST (UTC+2)	Osimhen 45+5' (pen.); Simeone (yellow card) 90+1'; Cajuste (yellow card) 90+5'	Report	Brekalo 7'; Terracciano (yellow card) 45+4'; Bonaventura 63', (yellow card) 70'; Martínez Quarta (yellow card) 69'; Ranieri (yellow card) 89'; González 90+3'	Stadium: Stadio Diego Armando Maradona; Attendance: 47,500; Referee: Federico La Penna

23 October 2023 9	Fiorentina	0–2	Empoli	Florence
20:45 CEST (UTC+2)	Beltrán (yellow card) 77'	Report	Caputo 21'; Walukiewicz (yellow card) 52'; Cancellieri (yellow card) 71'; Fazzini (yellow card) 79'; Gyasi 81'	Stadium: Stadio Artemio Franchi; Attendance: 29,105; Referee: Federico Dionisi

30 October 2023 10	Lazio	1–0	Fiorentina	Rome
20:45 CET (UTC+1)	Lazzari (yellow card) 31'; Rovella (yellow card) 45+2'; Zaccagni (yellow card) 67'; Immobile 90+5' (pen.)	Report	Duncan (yellow card) 40'; Ikoné (yellow card) 45+2'; Bonaventura (yellow card) 55'	Stadium: Stadio Olimpico; Attendance: 35,000; Referee: Matteo Marcenaro

5 November 2023 11	Fiorentina	0–1	Juventus	Florence
20:45 CET (UTC+1)	Ranieri (yellow card) 83'	Report	Miretti 10'; Rabiot (yellow card) 43'; Kean (yellow card) 48'; Gatti (yellow card) 58'	Stadium: Stadio Artemio Franchi; Attendance: 38,225; Referee: Daniele Chiffi

12 November 2023 12	Fiorentina	2–1	Bologna	Florence
15:00 CET (UTC+1)	Bonaventura 17', (yellow card) 45+2'; González 48' (pen.); Ranieri (yellow card) 90+5'	Report	Zirkzee 33' (pen.); Saelemaekers (yellow card) 36'; Aebischer (yellow card) 45+2'	Stadium: Stadio Artemio Franchi; Attendance: 29,750; Referee: Fabio Maresca

25 November 2023 13	Milan	1–0	Fiorentina	Milan
20:45 CET (UTC+1)	Hernandez 45+2' (pen.); Tomori (yellow card) 56'	Report	Arthur (yellow card) 12'; Parisi (yellow card) 45+1'	Stadium: San Siro; Attendance: 73,074; Referee: Marco Di Bello

3 December 2023 14	Fiorentina	3–0	Salernitana	Florence
15:00 CET (UTC+1)	Beltrán 6' (pen.); Sottil 18'; Ranieri (yellow card) 44'; Bonaventura 56'	Report		Stadium: Stadio Artemio Franchi; Attendance: 26,286; Referee: Paride Tremolada

10 December 2023 15	Roma	1–1	Fiorentina	Rome
20:45 CET (UTC+1)	Lukaku 5', (red card) 87'; Cristante (yellow card) 37'; Zalewski (yellow card) 41' (yellow-red card) 64'; Paredes (yellow card) 80'; Llorente (yellow card) 90+6'	Report	Ikoné (yellow card) 64'; Martínez Quarta 66'; Biraghi (yellow card) 75'; Duncan (yellow card) 86'	Stadium: Stadio Olimpico; Attendance: 60,932; Referee: Antonio Rapuano

17 December 2023 16	Fiorentina	1–0	Hellas Verona	Florence
15:00 CET (UTC+1)	Terracciano (yellow card) 2'; Biraghi (yellow card) 36'; Barák (yellow card) 65'; Beltrán 78'	Report	Đurić (penalty missed) 3'; Dawidowicz (yellow card) 67'	Stadium: Stadio Artemio Franchi; Attendance: 26,311; Referee: Maria Sole Ferrieri Caputi

22 December 2023 17	Monza	0–1	Fiorentina	Monza
20:45 CET (UTC+1)	Marí (yellow card) 33'; Akpa Akpro (yellow card) 72'; D'Ambrosio (yellow card) 88'	Report	Beltrán 7', (yellow card) 33'; Mina (yellow card) 68'; Kayode (yellow card) 86'; Ranieri (yellow card) 90+4'	Stadium: Stadio Brianteo; Attendance: 10,120; Referee: Juan Luca Sacchi

29 December 2023 18	Fiorentina	1–0	Torino	Florence
18:30 CET (UTC+1)	Biraghi (yellow card) 24'; Kayode (yellow card) 68'; Ranieri (yellow card) 75', (goal) 83'; Ikoné (yellow card) 87'	Report	Ricci (yellow card) 55'; Djidji (yellow card) 89'	Stadium: Stadio Artemio Franchi; Attendance: 32,915; Referee: Federico La Penna

6 January 2024 19	Sassuolo	1–0	Fiorentina	Reggio Emilia
20:45 CET (UTC+1)	Pinamonti 9', (yellow card) 52'; Matheus Henrique (yellow card) 34'; Berardi (yellow card) 69'	Report	Martínez Quarta (yellow card) 35'; Bonaventura (penalty missed) 64'; Ikoné (yellow card) 90+6'	Stadium: Mapei Stadium – Città del Tricolore; Attendance: 15,759; Referee: Rosario Abisso

14 January 2024 20	Fiorentina	2–2	Udinese	Florence
18:00 CET (UTC+1)	Beltrán 55'; Ranieri (yellow card) 62'; Nzola 87' (pen.)	Report	Lovrić 10'; Kamara (yellow card) 35'; Thauvin 73'	Stadium: Stadio Artemio Franchi; Attendance: 23,686; Referee: Luca Pairetto

28 January 2024 22	Fiorentina	0–1	Internazionale	Florence
20:45 CET (UTC+1)	Ikoné (yellow card) 45+2'; González (penalty missed) 76'; Mandragora (yellow card) 90+1'	Report	Martínez 14'; Bastoni (yellow card) 42'; Sommer (yellow card) 75'; Pavard (yellow card) 82'	Stadium: Stadio Artemio Franchi; Attendance: 35,084; Referee: Gianluca Aureliano

2 February 2024 23	Lecce	3–2	Fiorentina	Lecce
20:45 CET (UTC+1)	Oudin 17'; Almqvist (yellow card) 50'; Banda (yellow card) 77'; Gendrey (yellow card) 83'; Piccoli 90'; Dorgu 90+2'	Report	Martínez Quarta (yellow card) 15'; Mandragora 50'; Beltrán 67'; Ranieri (yellow card) 72'; González (yellow card) 90'	Stadium: Stadio Via del mare Attendance: 24,778; Referee: Antonio Giua

11 February 2024 24	Fiorentina	5–1	Frosinone	Florence
12:30 CET (UTC+1)	Martínez Quarta (yellow card) 4', (goal) 43'; Belotti 16'; Ikoné 19'; González 53'; Terracciano (yellow card) 69'; Barák 85'; Nzola (yellow card) 90+2'	Report	Romagnoli (yellow card) 50'; Mazzitelli 66'	Stadium: Stadio Artemio Franchi; Attendance: 25,397; Referee: Ermanno Feliciani

14 February 2024 21	Bologna	2–0	Fiorentina	Bologna
19:00 CET (UTC+1)	Orsolini 12'; Freuler (yellow card) 59'; Posch (yellow card) 90+2'; Odgaard 90+5'	Report	Milenković (yellow card) 35'; Biraghi (yellow card) 90+2'; Beltrán (yellow card) 90+7'	Stadium: Stadio Renato Dall'Ara; Attendance: 25,684; Referee: Daniele Chiffi
Note: The match was originally scheduled for 21 January 2024, but was postponed due to Fiorentina's participation in the 2023 Supercoppa Italiana.

18 February 2024 25	Empoli	1–1	Fiorentina	Empoli
15:00 CET (UTC+1)	Gyasi (yellow card) 2'; Luperto (yellow card) 45+4'; Niang 56' (pen.); Żurkowski (yellow card) 73'	Report	Beltrán 30', (yellow card) 82'; Biraghi (yellow card) 70'	Stadium: Stadio Carlo Castellani; Attendance: 12,490; Referee: Luca Pairetto

26 February 2024 26	Fiorentina	2–1	Lazio	Florence
20:45 CET (UTC+1)	Kayode 61'; González (penalty missed) 68'; Bonaventura 69'	Report	Luis Alberto 45'; Guendouzi (yellow card) 67'; Vecino (yellow card) 89'	Stadium: Stadio Artemio Franchi; Attendance: 25,190; Referee: Marco Guida

2 March 2024 27	Torino	0–0	Fiorentina	Turin
20:45 CET (UTC+1)	Ricci (yellow card) 45+5' (yellow-red card) 45+7'	Report	Ranieri (yellow card) 7'; Beltrán (yellow card) 41'; Arthur (yellow card) 45+7'; Barák (yellow card) 83'	Stadium: Stadio Olimpico Grande Torino; Attendance: 22,845; Referee: Matteo Marchetti

10 March 2024 28	Fiorentina	2–2	Roma	Florence
20:45 CET (UTC+1)	Ranieri 18'; Bonaventura (yellow card) 57'; Milenković (yellow card) 65'; Mandragora 69'; Biraghi (penalty missed) 80'	Report	Mancini (yellow card) 6'; Paredes (yellow card) 37'; Huijsen (yellow card) 45+1'; Aouar 58'; Ndicka (yellow card) 68'; Baldanzi (yellow card) 76'; Llorente 90+5'	Stadium: Stadio Artemio Franchi; Attendance: 30,438; Referee: Davide Massa

30 March 2024 30	Fiorentina	1–2	Milan	Florence
20:45 CET (UTC+1)	Biraghi (yellow card) 13'; Martínez Quarta (yellow card) 24'; Duncan 50'	Report	Thiaw (yellow card) 21'; Loftus-Cheek 47', (yellow card) 90+3'; Leão 53'; Tomori (yellow card) 90'	Stadium: Stadio Artemio Franchi; Attendance: 32,567; Referee: Fabio Maresca

7 April 2024 31	Juventus	1–0	Fiorentina	Turin
20:45 CEST (UTC+2)	Gatti 21'; Cambiaso (yellow card) 69'; Yıldız (yellow card) 87'	Report	Beltrán (yellow card) 90+3'	Stadium: Juventus Stadium; Attendance: 37,994; Referee: Federico La Penna

15 April 2024 32	Fiorentina	1–1	Genoa	Florence
18:30 CEST (UTC+2)	Ikoné 54'; Ranieri (yellow card) 90+1'	Report	Guðmundsson 42' (pen.); Spence (yellow card) 63'; Bani (yellow card) 90+6'	Stadium: Stadio Artemio Franchi; Attendance: 25,120; Referee: Davide Di Marco

21 April 2024 33	Salernitana	0–2	Fiorentina	Salerno
18:00 CEST (UTC+2)	Bašić (yellow card) 45+1'; Candreva (yellow card) 61'	Report	Lopez (yellow card) 18'; Sottil (yellow card) 45'; Ranieri (yellow card) 47'; Martínez Quarta (yellow card) 77'; Kouamé 80'; Ikoné 90+5'	Stadium: Stadio Arechi; Attendance: 14,597; Referee: Matteo Marchetti

28 April 2024 34	Fiorentina	5–1	Sassuolo	Florence
20:45 CEST (UTC+2)	Sottil 17'; Martínez Quarta (yellow card) 32', (goal) 54'; González 58', 66'; Barák 62'; Comuzzo (yellow card) 80'	Report	Ruan (yellow card) 13'; Thorstvedt 57', (yellow card) 67'	Stadium: Stadio Artemio Franchi; Attendance: 22,575; Referee: Matteo Marcenaro

5 May 2024 35	Hellas Verona	2–1	Fiorentina	Verona
15:00 CEST (UTC+2)	Lazović 13' (pen.); Coppola (yellow card) 46'; Noslin 59'; Folorunsho (yellow card) 79'	Report	Castrovilli 42'; Mandragora (yellow card) 77'	Stadium: Stadio Marcantonio Bentegodi; Attendance: 27,821; Referee: Antonio Rapuano

13 May 2024 36	Fiorentina	2–1	Monza	Florence
20:45 CEST (UTC+2)	González 32'; Parisi (yellow card) 41'; Arthur 78'	Report	Đurić 9'; Bondo (yellow card) 69'	Stadium: Stadio Artemio Franchi; Attendance: 24,376; Referee: Luca Zufferli

17 May 2024 37	Fiorentina	2–2	Napoli	Florence
20:45 CEST (UTC+2)	Biraghi 40'; Nzola 42'; Mandragora (yellow card) 84'	Report	Rrahmani 8'; Kvaratskhelia (yellow card) 41', (goal) 57'; Cajuste (yellow card) 70'	Stadium: Stadio Artemio Franchi; Attendance: 28,267; Referee: Matteo Marchetti

23 May 2024 38	Cagliari	2–3	Fiorentina	Cagliari
20:45 CEST (UTC+2)	Deiola 64'; Mutandwa 85'; Mina (yellow card) 90+2'; Sulemana (yellow card) 90+4'	Report	Bonaventura 39', (yellow card) 71'; Mandragora (yellow card) 44'; Biraghi (yellow card) 45+4'; González 89'; Nzola (yellow card) 90'; Arthur 90+13' (pen.)	Stadium: Unipol Domus; Attendance: 16,412; Referee: Alessandro Prontera

2 June 2024 29	Atalanta	2–3	Fiorentina	Bergamo
18:00 CEST (UTC+2)	Lookman 12'; Scalvini 32'	Report	Belotti 6', 45+1'; González 19'; Martínez Quarta (yellow card) 75'; Ranieri (yellow card) 85'	Stadium: Gewiss Stadium; Attendance: 14,851; Referee: Daniele Orsato
Note: The match was originally scheduled for 17 March 2024, but was postponed after Fiorentina sporting director Joe Barone fell ill and was rushed to hospital.

=== Coppa Italia ===
6 December 2023 Round of 16	Fiorentina	2–2 (a.e.t.) (4–1 p)	Parma	Florence
21:00 CET (UTC+1)	Mina (yellow card) 38'; Nzola 83', (yellow card) 92'; Sottil 90' (pen.); Infantino (yellow card) 120'	Report	Bernabé 21'; Bonny 23'; Chichizola (yellow card) 39'; Ansaldi (yellow card) 96'	Stadium: Stadio Artemio Franchi; Attendance: 23,113; Referee: Livio Marinelli
	Penalties
	Biraghi (penalty scored); Kouamé (penalty scored); Milenković (penalty scored); Beltrán (penalty scored)		(penalty scored) Hernani; (penalty missed) Man; (penalty missed) Camara

9 January 2024 Quarter-finals	Fiorentina	0–0 (a.e.t.) (5–4 p)	Bologna	Florence
21:00 CET (UTC+1)	Bonaventura (yellow card) 116'	Report	Ferguson (yellow card) 89'; Saelemaekers (yellow card) 109'	Stadium: Stadio Artemio Franchi; Attendance: 25,079; Referee: Matteo Marchetti
	Penalties
	Mandragora (penalty scored); Arthur (penalty scored); Milenković (penalty scored); Mina (penalty scored); Lopez (penalty scored)		(penalty scored) Ferguson; (penalty scored) Zirkzee; (penalty scored) Orsolini; (penalty scored) Calafiori; (penalty missed) Posch

3 April 2024 Semi-finals; First leg	Fiorentina	1–0	Atalanta	Florence
21:00 CEST (UTC+2)	Mandragora 31', (yellow card) 55'; Kouamé (yellow card) 81'	Report	Miranchuk (yellow card) 29'; De Roon (yellow card) 79'; Scamacca (yellow card) 90'	Stadium: Stadio Artemio Franchi; Attendance: 21,560; Referee: Maurizio Mariani

24 April 2024 Semi-finals; Second leg	Atalanta	4–1 (4–2 agg.)	Fiorentina	Bergamo
21:00 CEST (UTC+2)	Koopmeiners 8'; Kolašinac (yellow card) 56'; Scamacca 75', (yellow card) 80'; Lookman 90+5'; Pašalić 90+8'	Report	Mandragora (yellow card) 43'; Milenković (red card) 53'; Martínez Quarta 68'; Dodô (yellow card) 69'	Stadium: Gewiss Stadium; Attendance: 14,909; Referee: Federico La Penna

=== Supercoppa Italiana ===
18 January 2024 Semi-finals	Napoli	3–0	Fiorentina	Riyadh, Saudi Arabia
22:00 SAST (UTC+3)	Simeone 22'; Zerbin 84', 86'	Report	Ikoné (penalty missed) 44'; Biraghi (yellow card) 51'	Stadium: KSU Stadium; Attendance: 9,762; Referee: Federico La Penna

=== UEFA Europa Conference League ===
==== Play-off round ====
The draw for the play-off round was held on 7 August 2023.

24 August 2023 First leg	Rapid Wien (Austria)	1–0	(Italy) Fiorentina	Vienna, Austria
19:00 CEST (UTC+2)	Grüll 35' (pen.); Hofmann (yellow card) 53'; Schick (yellow card) 90'	Report	Mandragora (yellow card) 35'; Bonaventura (yellow card) 42'	Stadium: Allianz Stadion; Attendance: 23,000; Referee: Igor Pajac (Croatia)

31 August 2023 Second leg	Fiorentina (Italy)	2–0 (2–1 agg.)	(Austria) Rapid Wien	Florence, Italy
20:00 CEST (UTC+2)	Mandragora (yellow card) 19'; Arthur (yellow card) 52'; González 59', 90' (pen.); Sottil (yellow card) 90+4'	Report	Kühn (yellow card) 19'; Kerschbaum (yellow card) 25'; Querfeld (yellow card) 43'; Sattlberger (yellow card) 82'; Grüll (yellow card) 89'; Auer (yellow card) 90+6'	Stadium: Stadio Artemio Franchi; Attendance: 24,135; Referee: Novak Simović (Serbia)

==== Group stage ====
The draw for the group stage was held on 1 September 2023.

Pos	Team	Pld	W	D	L	GF	GA	GD	Pts	Qualification	FIO	FER	GNK	ČUK
1	(Italy) Fiorentina	6	3	3	0	14	6	+8	12	Advance to round of 16	—	2–2	2–1	6–0
2	(Hungary) Ferencváros	6	2	4	0	9	6	+3	10	Advance to knockout round play-offs	1–1	—	1–1	3–1
3	(Belgium) Genk	6	2	3	1	8	5	+3	9		2–2	0–0	—	2–0
4	(Serbia) Čukarički	6	0	0	6	2	16	−14	0		0–1	1–2	0–2	—

Source: UEFA
Rules for classification: Group stage tiebreakers

21 September 2023 1	Genk (Belgium)	2–2	(Italy) Fiorentina	Genk, Belgium
18:45 CEST (UTC+2)	Zeqiri 12'; Muñoz (yellow card) 29'; McKenzie 85'	Report	Ranieri 7', 23'; Mandragora (yellow card) 33'; Biraghi (yellow card) 45+5'	Stadium: Cegeka Arena; Attendance: 11,243; Referee: Stéphanie Frappart (France)

5 October 2023 2	Fiorentina (Italy)	2–2	(Hungary) Ferencváros	Florence, Italy
21:00 CEST (UTC+2)	Barák 66'; González (yellow card) 86'; Ikoné 90+3'	Report	Sigér (yellow card) 23'; Varga 25', (yellow card) 57'; Cissé 50'; Mmaee (yellow card) 55'; Romdhane (yellow card) 66'; Dibusz (yellow card) 70'	Stadium: Stadio Artemio Franchi; Attendance: 20,367; Referee: Daniel Schlager (Germany)

26 October 2023 3	Fiorentina (Italy)	6–0	(Serbia) Čukarički	Florence, Italy
21:00 CEST (UTC+2)	Beltrán 6', 10'; Ikoné 29'; Sottil 65'; Martínez Quarta 73'; Lopez 83'	Report	Vranješ (yellow card) 7'; Docić (yellow card) 10'; Subotić (red card) 36'	Stadium: Stadio Artemio Franchi; Attendance: 15,357; Referee: Chrysovalantis Theouli (Cyprus)

9 November 2023 4	Čukarički (Serbia)	0–1	(Italy) Fiorentina	Leskovac, Serbia
18:45 CET (UTC+1)	N'Diaye (yellow card) 6'; Adetunji (yellow card) 40'; Nikčević (yellow card) 47'; Singh (yellow card) 90+6'	Report	Nzola 8' (pen.); Biraghi (yellow card) 44'; Parisi (yellow card) 83'	Stadium: Dubočica Stadium; Attendance: 3,402; Referee: Robert Schröder (Germany)
Note: The match was played at the Dubočica Stadium in Leskovac, instead of Čukarički's regular stadium, the Čukarički Stadium in Belgrade, which did not meet UEFA requirements.

30 November 2023 5	Fiorentina (Italy)	2–1	(Belgium) Genk	Florence, Italy
21:00 CET (UTC+1)	Martínez Quarta (yellow card) 28', (goal) 45+4'; González 82' (pen.); Milenković (yellow card) 90+2'; Biraghi (yellow card) 90+7'; Kouamé (yellow card) 90+8'	Report	Fadera (yellow card) 20'; Kayembe 45'; Muñoz (yellow card) 81'; Paintsil (yellow card) 89'; Hrošovský (yellow card) 89'; Zeqiri (yellow card) 90+2'; Galarza (yellow card) 90+4'; Cuesta (yellow card) 90+6'	Stadium: Stadio Artemio Franchi; Attendance: 16,666; Referee: Joey Kooij (Netherlands)

14 December 2023 6	Ferencváros (Hungary)	1–1	(Italy) Fiorentina	Budapest, Hungary
18:45 CET (UTC+1)	Zachariassen 48'; Cissé (yellow card) 60'	Report	Mandragora (yellow card) 10'; Milenković (yellow card) 31'; Ranieri 73'	Stadium: Ferencváros Stadion; Attendance: 20,657; Referee: Luis Godinho (Portugal)

==== Knockout phase ====
===== Round of 16 =====
The draw for the round of 16 was held on 23 February 2024.

7 March 2024 First leg	Maccabi Haifa (Israel)	3–4	(Italy) Fiorentina	Budapest, Hungary
21:00 CET (UTC+1)	Mohamed (yellow card) 10'; Seck 12'; Kinda 29'; Khalaili 67'; Cafumana (yellow card) 69' (yellow-red card) 80'	Report	Nzola 2'; Beltrán 58'; Mandragora 73'; Kayode (yellow card) 84'; Milenković (yellow card) 87'; Barák 90+5'	Stadium: Bozsik Aréna; Attendance: 1,589; Referee: Donatas Rumšas (Lithuania)
Note: Due to the Gaza war, Maccabi Haifa played their home match at a neutral venue.

14 March 2024 Second leg	Fiorentina (Italy)	1–1 (5–4 agg.)	(Israel) Maccabi Haifa	Florence, Italy
18:45 CET (UTC+1)	Barák 59'; Belotti (yellow card) 90+6'	Report	Cornud (yellow card) 16'; Šimić (yellow card) 79'; Khalaily 88'	Stadium: Stadio Artemio Franchi; Attendance: 6,838; Referee: Irfan Peljto (Bosnia and Herzegovina)

===== Quarter-finals =====
The draw for the quarter-finals was held on 15 March 2024.

11 April 2024 First leg	Viktoria Plzeň (Czech Republic)	0–0	(Italy) Fiorentina	Plzeň, Czech Republic
18:45 CEST (UTC+2)	Cadu (yellow card) 16'; Řezník (yellow card) 72'; Chorý (yellow card) 90+3'	Report	Ikoné (yellow card) 90'	Stadium: Doosan Arena; Attendance: 11,470; Referee: Orel Grinfeld (Israel)

18 April 2024 Second leg	Fiorentina (Italy)	2–0 (a.e.t.) (2–0 agg.)	(Czech Republic) Viktoria Plzeň	Florence, Italy
18:45 CEST (UTC+2)	Ranieri (yellow card) 36'; González 92', (yellow card) 93'; Biraghi 108'	Report	Chorý (yellow card) 37'; Cadu (red card) 66'; Řezník (yellow card) 74'	Stadium: Stadio Artemio Franchi; Attendance: 19,418; Referee: Jesús Gil Manzano (Spain)

===== Semi-finals =====
The draw for the semi-finals was held on 15 March 2024, after the draw for the quarter-finals.

2 May 2024 First leg	Fiorentina (Italy)	3–2	(Belgium) Club Brugge	Florence, Italy
21:00 CEST (UTC+2)	Sottil 5'; González (yellow card) 36'; Belotti 37'; Martínez Quarta (yellow card) 70'; Nzola 90+1'	Report	Vanaken 17' (pen.); Onyedika (yellow card) 58' (yellow-red card) 61'; Thiago 63'; Jackers (yellow card) 85'	Stadium: Stadio Artemio Franchi; Attendance: 27,516; Referee: Michael Oliver (England)

8 May 2024 Second leg	Club Brugge (Belgium)	1–1 (3–4 agg.)	(Italy) Fiorentina	Bruges, Belgium
18:45 CEST (UTC+2)	Vanaken 20', (yellow card) 90+5'; Ordóñez (yellow card) 43'; Thiago (yellow card) 52'; Vetlesen (yellow card) 62'; Odoi (yellow card) 72' (yellow-red card) 90+4'; Mechele (yellow card) 83'	Report	Beltrán 85' (pen.), (yellow card) 90'; Milenković (yellow card) 88'; Dodô (yellow card) 90+4'; Nzola (yellow card) 90+6'	Stadium: Jan Breydel Stadium; Attendance: 26,936; Referee: Halil Umut Meler (Turkey)
Note: The match was pushed back by a day due to the anticipated Holy Blood Procession on 9 May 2024.

===== Final =====
29 May 2024 Final	Olympiacos (Greece)	1–0 (a.e.t.)	(Italy) Fiorentina	Athens, Greece
22:00 EEST (UTC+3)	Podence (yellow card) 28'; Jovetić (yellow card) 94'; Paschalakis (yellow card) 95'; El Kaabi 116', (yellow card) 117'	Report	Martínez Quarta (yellow card) 42'; Kouamé (yellow card) 79'; Biraghi (yellow card) 99'	Stadium: Agia Sophia Stadium; Attendance: 26,842; Referee: Artur Soares Dias (Portugal)

== Squad statistics ==
No.	Pos	Nat	Player	Total		Serie A		Coppa Italia		Supercoppa Italiana		UEFA Europa Conference League	
No.	Pos	Nat	Player	Apps	Goals	Apps	Goals	Apps	Goals	Apps	Goals	Apps	Goals
Goalkeepers
1	GK	(Italy) ITA	Pietro Terracciano	47	0	33	0	2	0	1	0	11	0
30	GK	(Italy) ITA	Tommaso Martinelli	1	0	1	0	0	0	0	0	0	0
53	GK	(Denmark) DEN	Oliver Christensen	10	0	4	0	2	0	0	0	4	0
Defenders
2	DF	(Brazil) BRA	Dodô	18	0	7+2	0	1	0	0	0	7+1	0
3	DF	(Italy) ITA	Cristiano Biraghi	46	3	27+2	2	2+1	0	1	0	13	1
4	DF	(Serbia) SRB	Nikola Milenković	50	0	27+7	0	4	0	1	0	10+1	0
16	DF	(Italy) ITA	Luca Ranieri	43	5	23+3	2	3+1	0	0	0	11+2	3
22	DF	(Italy) ITA	Davide Faraoni	11	0	4+4	0	0	0	0+1	0	1+1	0
28	DF	(Argentina) ARG	Lucas Martínez Quarta	42	8	26+3	5	1+1	1	1	0	8+2	2
33	DF	(Italy) ITA	Michael Kayode	37	1	22+4	1	3+1	0	1	0	5+1	0
37	DF	(Italy) ITA	Pietro Comuzzo	6	0	0+4	0	0+1	0	0	0	0+1	0
65	DF	(Italy) ITA	Fabiano Parisi	32	0	15+5	0	2+1	0	0+1	0	3+5	0
Midfielders
5	MF	(Italy) ITA	Giacomo Bonaventura	43	8	27+4	8	2+1	0	1	0	7+1	0
6	MF	(Brazil) BRA	Arthur	48	2	23+10	2	0+3	0	1	0	8+3	0
8	MF	(France) FRA	Maxime Lopez	31	1	7+12	0	2	0	0	0	5+5	1
17	MF	(Italy) ITA	Gaetano Castrovilli	6	1	5+1	1	0	0	0	0	0	0
19	MF	(Argentina) ARG	Gino Infantino	9	0	0+6	0	0+1	0	0	0	0+2	0
32	MF	(Ghana) GHA	Alfred Duncan	41	2	24+6	2	1+1	0	1	0	4+4	0
38	MF	(Italy) ITA	Rolando Mandragora	50	5	16+17	3	3+1	1	0	0	12+1	1
72	MF	(Czech Republic) CZE	Antonín Barák	34	5	8+13	2	2	0	0+1	0	4+6	3
Forwards
7	FW	(Italy) ITA	Riccardo Sottil	35	5	13+9	2	1	1	0+1	0	6+5	2
9	FW	(Argentina) ARG	Lucas Beltrán	51	10	21+11	6	3+1	0	1	0	9+5	4
10	FW	(Argentina) ARG	Nicolás González	44	16	21+8	12	2	0	0	0	13	4
11	FW	(France) FRA	Jonathan Ikoné	43	5	18+10	3	1+2	0	1	0	4+7	2
18	FW	(Angola) ANG	M'Bala Nzola	47	7	15+18	3	1+1	1	0+1	0	4+7	3
20	FW	(Italy) ITA	Andrea Belotti	24	4	11+4	3	2	0	0	0	6+1	1
99	FW	(Ivory Coast) CIV	Christian Kouamé	38	2	11+12	2	2+1	0	0	0	6+6	0
Players transferred/loaned out during the season
26	DF	(Colombia) COL	Yerry Mina	7	0	0+4	0	1+1	0	0	0	1	0
27	MF	(Morocco) MAR	Abdelhamid Sabiri	0	0	0	0	0	0	0	0	0	0
70	DF	(Italy) ITA	Niccolò Pierozzi	2	0	0	0	0	0	0	0	1+1	0
73	MF	(Italy) ITA	Lorenzo Amatucci	2	0	0+2	0	0	0	0	0	0	0
77	MF	(Croatia) CRO	Josip Brekalo	18	1	8+3	1	1	0	1	0	2+3	0
91	FW	(Russia) RUS	Aleksandr Kokorin	1	0	0	0	0	0	0	0	0+1	0

Source: Competitions
