= Marco Carnesecchi =

Italian footballer (born 2000)

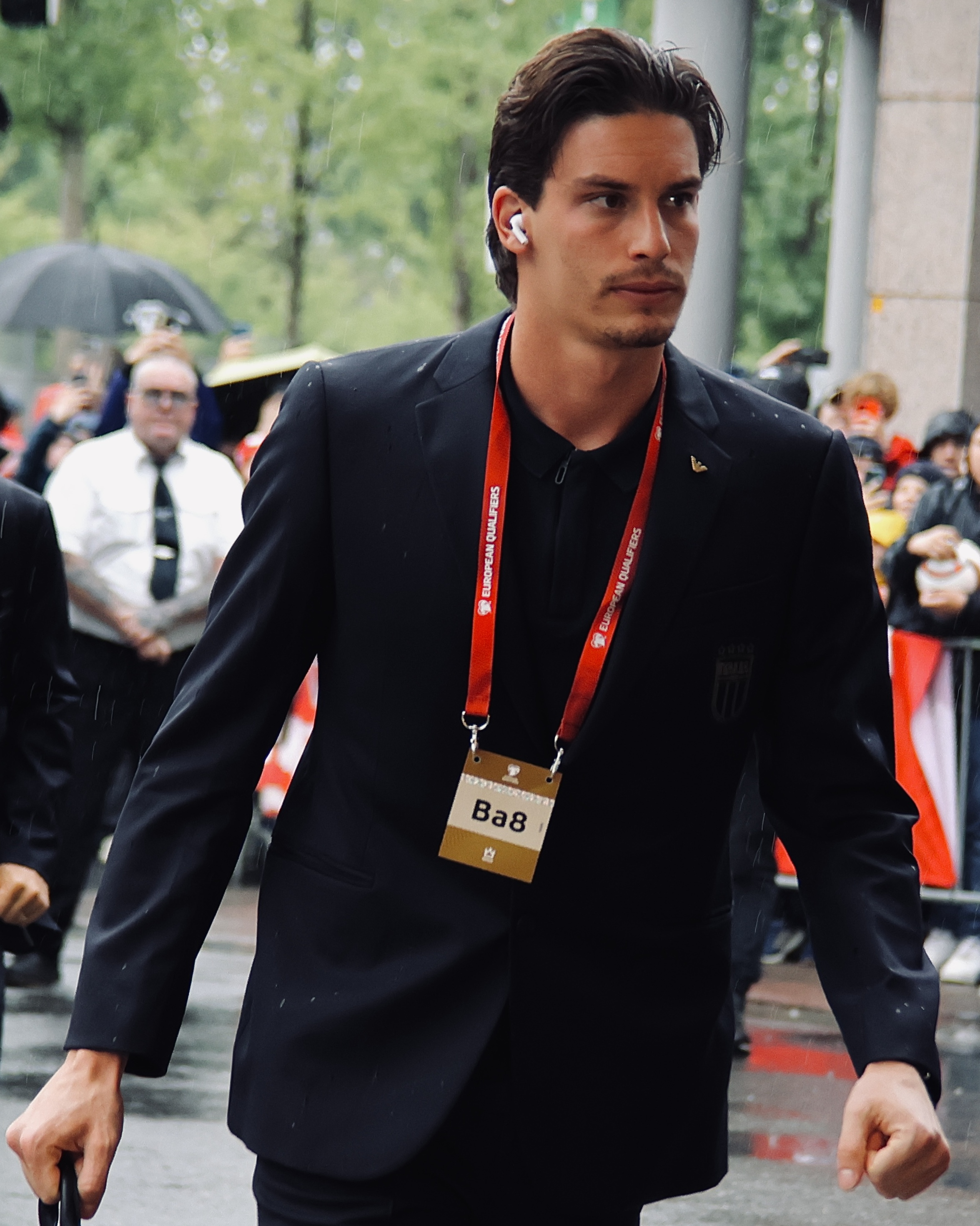
- Carnesecchi with Italy in 2025

Personal information
- Full name: Marco Carnesecchi
- Date of birth: 1 July 2000 (age 26)
- Place of birth: Rimini, Italy
- Height: 1.95 m (6 ft 5 in)
- Position: Goalkeeper

Team information
- Current team: Atalanta
- Number: 29

Youth career
- –2017: Cesena
- 2017–2019: Atalanta
- 2017: → Cesena (loan)

Senior career*
Years	Team	Apps	(Gls)
2019–	Atalanta	109	(0)
2019–2020	→ Trapani (loan)	33	(0)
2021–2023	→ Cremonese (loan)	83	(0)

International career^{‡}
2016–2017	Italy U17	4	(0)
2017–2018	Italy U18	6	(0)
2018–2019	Italy U19	14	(0)
2018–2019	Italy U20	3	(0)
2019–2023	Italy U21	22	(0)
- * Club domestic league appearances and goals as of 23:03, 8 November 2026 (UTC) ‡ National team caps and goals as of 28 June 2023

Marco Carnesecchi (Italian pronunciation: [ˈmarko karneˈsekki]; born 1 July 2000) is an Italian professional footballer who plays as a goalkeeper for Serie A club Atalanta.

== Club career ==
=== Atalanta ===
Carnesecchi started playing for the Under-19 squad of Atalanta in the 2017–18 season. He was first called up to the senior squad on 14 January 2019 for a 2018–19 Coppa Italia game against Cagliari, but remained on the bench.

==== Loan to Trapani ====
On 25 July 2019, Carnesecchi was loaned to the newly promoted Serie B club Trapani. He made his professional Serie B debut for Trapani on 22 September 2019 in a game against Salernitana. He played the whole game.

==== Loan to Cremonese ====
On 5 January 2021, Carnesecchi was loaned to Serie B club Cremonese for the remainder of the 2020–21 season, having spent the first few months as an unused substitute at Atalanta. In his first season at Cremonese, Carnesecchi kept 8 clean sheets in 20 matches. His loan was subsequently extended for another season. On 31 August 2022, Carnesecchi returned to Cremonese on a new loan, with the club now in Serie A.

== International career ==
Carnesecchi was first called up to represent his country for the under-17 squad in October 2016 and made his debut on 14 December 2016 in a friendly against Hungary. He was selected for Italy's 2017 UEFA European Under-17 Championship squad, but did not make any appearances behind first-choice Simone Ghidotti.

He was the first-choice goalkeeper for Italy at the 2019 UEFA European Under-19 Championship as the team was eliminated in the group stage.

At the 2019 FIFA U-20 World Cup, he made two appearances in the group game against Japan and the third-place game against Ecuador, backing up Alessandro Plizzari in other games.

On 6 September 2019, he made his debut for the Italy U21 squad in a friendly against Moldova.

On 24 January 2022, Carnesecchi accepted a call-up by Italy national team manager Roberto Mancini to join the Azzurri for a three-day training camp in Coverciano.

== Career statistics ==
As of match played 8 November 2026

Appearances and goals by club, season and competition
Club	Season	League			Coppa Italia		Europe		Other		Total	
Club	Season	Division	Apps	Goals	Apps	Goals	Apps	Goals	Apps	Goals	Apps	Goals
Trapani (loan)	2019–20	Serie B	33	0	1	0	—		—		34	0
Cremonese (loan)	2020–21	Serie B	20	0	0	0	—		—		20	0
Cremonese (loan)	2021–22	Serie B	36	0	1	0	—		—		37	0
Cremonese (loan)	2022–23	Serie A	27	0	1	0	—		—		28	0
Cremonese (loan)	Total		83	0	2	0	—		—		85	0
Atalanta	2023–24	Serie A	27	0	4	0	1 (Note: Appearance(s) in UEFA Europa League)	0	—		32	0
Atalanta	2024–25	Serie A	34	0	0	0	9 (Note: Appearance(s) in UEFA Champions League)	0	1 (Note: Appearance(s) in Supercoppa Italiana)	0	44	0
Atalanta	2025–26	Serie A	37	0	3	0	10	0	—		50	0
Atalanta	2026–27	Serie A	11	0	0	0	5 (Note: Appearance(s) in UEFA Conference League)	0	—		16	0
Atalanta	Total		109	0	7	0	25	0	1	0	142	0
Career total			225	0	10	0	25	0	1	0	261	0

== Honours ==
Atalanta

- UEFA Europa League: 2023–24

Individual

- UEFA European Under-21 Championship Team of the Tournament: 2021
