= Gino Infantino =

Argentine footballer (born 2003)

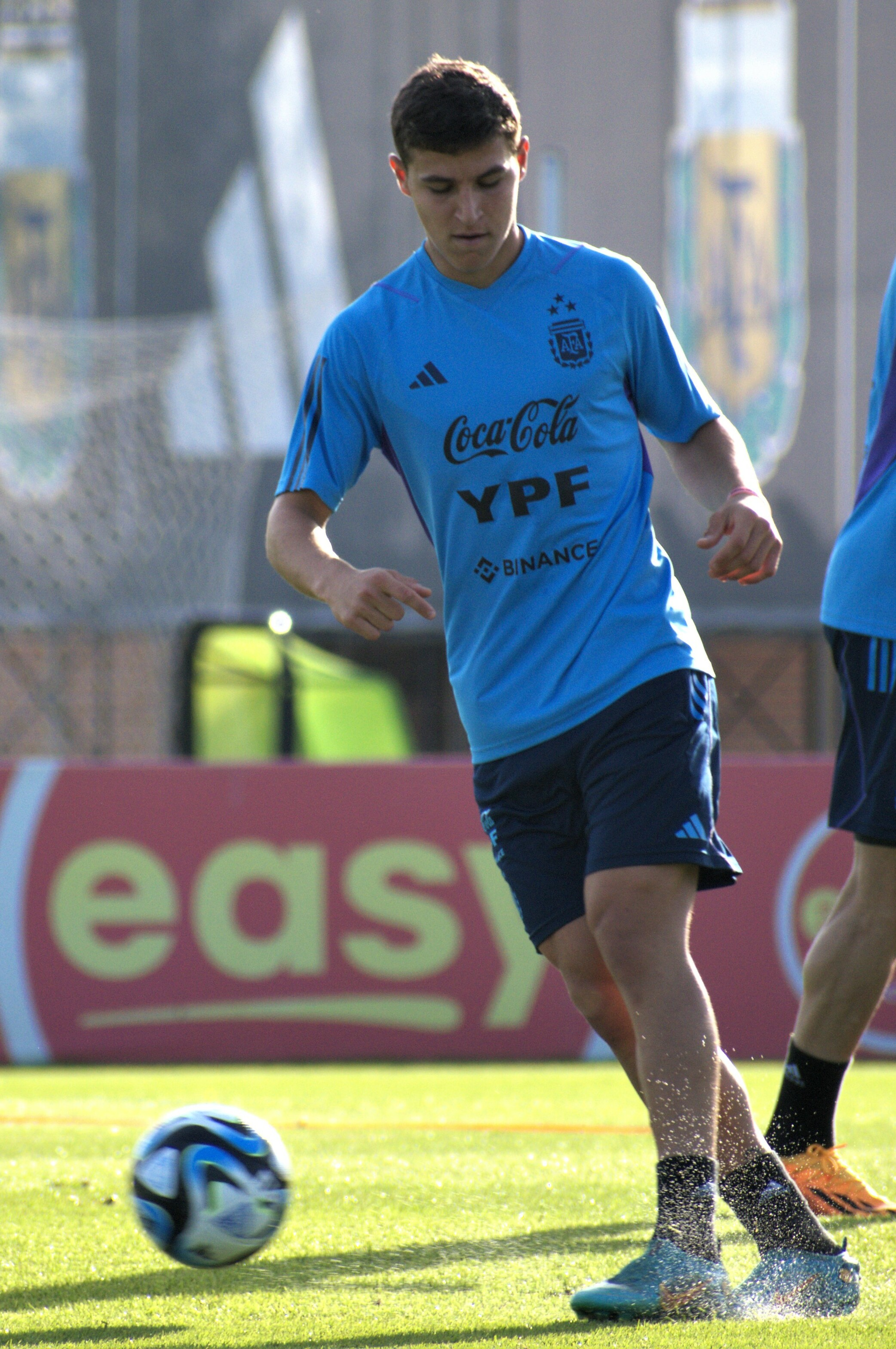
- Infantino in training with Argentina U20 in 2023

Personal information
- Full name: Gino Infantino
- Date of birth: 19 May 2003 (age 23)
- Place of birth: Rosario, Argentina
- Height: 1.78 m (5 ft 10 in)
- Positions: Right midfielder; attacking midfielder

Team information
- Current team: Argentinos Juniors (on loan from Fiorentina)
- Number: 32

Youth career
- Villa del Parque
- –2014: Renato Cesarini
- 2014–2018: ADIUR
- 2018–2020: Rosario Central

Senior career*
Years	Team	Apps	(Gls)
2020–2023	Rosario Central	71	(6)
2023–	Fiorentina	6	(0)
2024–2025	→ Al Ain (loan)	3	(0)
2026–	→ Argentinos Juniors (loan)	2	(0)

International career^{‡}
2022	Argentina U23	15	(2)
- * Club domestic league appearances and goals as of 17:32, 10 July 2026 (UTC) ‡ National team caps and goals as of 20 August 2025

Gino Infantino (born 19 May 2003) is an Argentine professional footballer who plays as a right midfielder or attacking midfielder for Primera División club Argentinos Juniors, on loan from Serie A club Fiorentina.

== Club career ==
Infantino spent his early years with Villa del Parque. He moved to Renato Cesarini, remaining for six years; a period that included a trial with Real Madrid. At age eleven, he joined ADIUR. After four years, which included a trial with Villarreal, he moved to Rosario Central in 2018. He made his first-team breakthrough in mid-2020 under manager Kily González, initially featuring in pre-season matches. He was an unused substitute in Copa de la Liga Profesional matches against Godoy Cruz and River Plate before making his senior debut on 13 November against Banfield.

On 3 August 2023, Infantino signed a five-year contract with Serie A club Fiorentina.

== International career ==
Infantino has represented Argentina at various youth levels. In August 2017, he trained with the under-15s. He was called up for the under-16s in January 2019.

== Personal life ==
Born and raised in Argentina, Infantino is of Italian descent.

== Career statistics ==
As of match played 2 June 2024

Appearances and goals by club, season and competition
Club	Season	League			National cup		Continental		Other		Total	
Club	Season	Division	Apps	Goals	Apps	Goals	Apps	Goals	Apps	Goals	Apps	Goals
Rosario Central	2020–21 (Note: Soccerway counts Copa de la Liga Profesional appearances as league appearances)	Argentine Primera División	5	0	0	0	—		0	0	5	0
Rosario Central	2021	Argentine Primera División	15	3	0	0	2 (Note: Appearances in Copa Sudamericana)	0	0	0	17	3
Rosario Central	2022	Argentine Primera División	34	2	1	0	—		0	0	35	2
Rosario Central	2023	Argentine Primera División	17	1	0	0	—		0	0	17	1
Rosario Central	Total		71	6	1	0	2	0	0	0	74	6
Fiorentina	2023–24	Serie A	6	0	1	0	2 (Note: Appearances in UEFA Europa Conference League)	0	0	0	9	0
Career total			77	6	2	0	4	0	0	0	83	6
