= Lucas Beltrán =

Argentine footballer (born 2001)

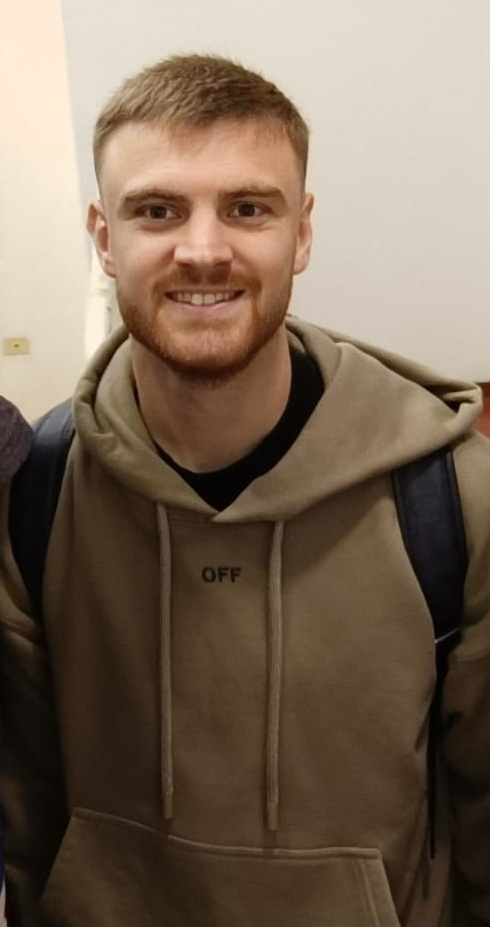
- Beltran in 2024

Personal information
- Date of birth: 29 March 2001 (age 25)
- Place of birth: Córdoba, Argentina
- Height: 1.76 m (5 ft 9 in)
- Positions: Forward; attacking midfielder

Team information
- Current team: River Plate (on loan from Fiorentina)
- Number: 18

Youth career
- Instituto
- 2016–2018: River Plate

Senior career*
Years	Team	Apps	(Gls)
2018–2023	River Plate	46	(16)
2021–2022	→ Colón (loan)	18	(3)
2023–	Fiorentina	65	(11)
2025–2026	→ Valencia (loan)	27	(1)
2026–	→ River Plate (loan)	15	(1)

International career^{‡}
2024	Argentina Olympic	4	(0)
- * Club domestic league appearances and goals as of 5 November 2026 ‡ National team caps and goals as of 2 August 2024

Lucas Beltrán (born 29 March 2001) is an Argentine professional footballer who plays as a forward or attacking midfielder for Primera División club River Plate, on loan from Serie A club Fiorentina. Beltrán competed for Argentina at the 2024 Summer Olympics and he also plays for the Argentina national team.

== Career ==
=== River Plate ===
Beltrán began in the ranks of Instituto, departing in 2016 to sign for Argentine Primera División side River Plate. He made his professional debut on 2 December 2018 at the age of seventeen, appearing for the last seven minutes of a game against Gimnasia y Esgrima. He had previously been an unused substitute a week earlier versus Aldosivi on 27 October.

On 15 July 2021, Beltrán joined Colón on a dry loan until the end of 2022.

=== Fiorentina ===
On 11 July 2023, Beltrán joined Fiorentina on a transfer worth €20 million plus add-ons.

On 26 October 2023, he scored his first two goals for the club in a 6–0 win over FK Čukarički in the group stage of the UEFA Europa Conference League. His first Serie A goal came from the penalty spot in a 3–0 win against Salernitana on 3 December. On 8 May 2024, he scored a penalty in a 1–1 away draw against Club Brugge in the Europa Conference League semi-final second leg, which qualified his club to their second consecutive final by winning 4–3 on aggregate.

On 1 September 2025, Beltrán moved to La Liga side Valencia on a one-year loan deal.

== Personal life ==
Born and raised in Argentina, Beltrán is of Italian descent.

== Career statistics ==
As of match played 13 Dec 2025

Appearances and goals by club, season and competition
Club	Season	League			National cup (Note: Includes Copa Argentina, Coppa Italia)		League cup		Continental		Other		Total	
Club	Season	Division	Apps	Goals	Apps	Goals	Apps	Goals	Apps	Goals	Apps	Goals	Apps	Goals
River Plate	2018–19	Argentine Primera División	4	0	0	0	—		0	0	—		4	0
River Plate	2019–20	Argentine Primera División	0	0	4	0	1	0	0	0	—		5	0
River Plate	Total		4	0	4	0	1	0	0	0	0	0	9	0
Colón	2021	Argentine Primera División	17	2	2	0	1	0	1 (Note: Appearance(s) in Copa Libertadores)	0	—		21	2
Colón	2022	Argentine Primera División	1	1	1	0	14	5	6	0	—		22	6
Colón	Total		18	3	3	0	15	5	7	0	0	0	43	8
River Plate	2022	Argentine Primera División	21	4	3	1	—		2	0	—		26	5
River Plate	2023	Argentine Primera División	25	12	2	1	—		8	3	—		35	16
River Plate	Total		46	16	5	2	0	0	10	3	0	0	61	21
Fiorentina	2023–24	Serie A	32	6	4	0	—		14 (Note: Appearances in UEFA Conference League)	4	1 (Note: Appearance in Supercoppa Italiana)	0	51	10
Fiorentina	2024–25	Serie A	33	5	1	0	—		13	1	—		47	6
Fiorentina	Total		65	11	5	0	0	0	27	5	1	0	98	16
Valencia (loan)	2025–26	La Liga	13	1	—		—		—		—		13	1
Career total			146	31	17	2	16	5	44	8	1	0	224	46

== Honours ==
River Plate

- Supercopa Argentina: 2019
- Argentine Primera División: 2023

Colón

- Trofeo de Campeones runner-up: 2021

Fiorentina

- UEFA Conference League runner-up: 2023–24

Individual

- Argentine Primera División Team of the Season: 2023
