= Caleb Okoli =

Italian footballer (born 2001)

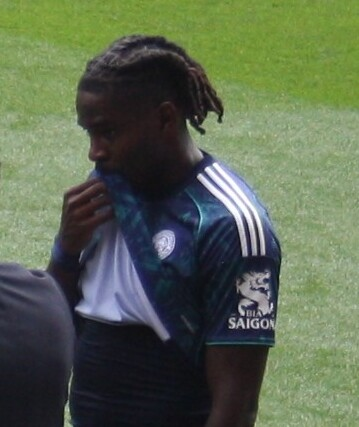
- Okoli with Leicester City in 2025

Personal information
- Full name: Memeh Caleb Okoli
- Date of birth: 13 July 2001 (age 25)
- Place of birth: Vicenza, Italy
- Height: 1.91 m (6 ft 3 in)
- Position: Centre-back

Team information
- Current team: Leicester City
- Number: 5

Youth career
- 2015–2016: Vicenza
- 2016–2020: Atalanta

Senior career*
Years	Team	Apps	(Gls)
2020–2024	Atalanta	17	(0)
2020–2021	→ SPAL (loan)	16	(1)
2021–2022	→ Cremonese (loan)	27	(0)
2023–2024	→ Frosinone (loan)	34	(0)
2024–	Leicester City	49	(2)

International career
2019–2020	Italy U19	10	(0)
2021	Italy U20	1	(0)
2021–2023	Italy U21	14	(1)
- * Club domestic league appearances and goals as of 02:16, 16 August 2026 (UTC)

Memeh Caleb Okoli (born 13 July 2001) is an Italian professional footballer who plays as a centre-back for EFL League One club Leicester City.

== Club career ==
=== Atalanta ===
Okoli started his career with the youth academy of Vicenza, and then he joined the youth teams of Atalanta in the summer of 2015, where he started playing for their under-19 squad in the 2018–19 season. Okoli was occasionally called up to Atalanta's senior team in that season and the next, but never appeared on the field. He also represented the club in the UEFA Youth League.

==== Loan to SPAL ====
On 25 September 2020, Okoli joined Serie B club SPAL on loan.

He made his Serie B debut for SPAL on 21 November 2020 in a game against Pescara. Okoli started and played the full game in a 2–0 victory.

He grabbed his first ever career goal on 10 April 2021 in a Serie B game, which was in a 2–1 away win against Leece, where he scored the winner in the 54th minute.

==== Loan to Cremonese ====
On 12 July 2021, Okoli joined Serie B club Cremonese on a season-long loan.

==== Return to Atalanta ====
He returned to Atalanta in July 2022, after his loan ended, and was integrated into Atalanta's first team for the following season. Okoli made his Serie A debut with Atalanta on 13 August 2022 in a 2–0 victory over Sampdoria.

==== Loan to Frosinone ====
On 1 September 2023, he moved to newly promoted Serie A club Frosinone on a season-long loan.

=== Leicester City ===
On 9 July 2024, Okoli signed for newly promoted Premier League club Leicester City on a five-year deal. He made his competitive debut for the club on 1 September 2024 in a 2–1 home defeat to Aston Villa. He then grabbed his first-ever Premier League goal on 12 April 2025 in a 2–2 away draw to Brighton.

== International career ==
Born in Italy to parents of Nigerian origin, Okoli is Igbo and Yoruba by descent. He was first called up to represent Italy in 2019 with the Italy U19 side.

Okoli made his debut with the Italy U21 team on 7 September 2021, playing as a starter in the qualifying match 1–0 win against Montenegro. He was called up to the senior Italy squad for 2024–25 UEFA Nations League matches against France and Israel on 6 and 9 September 2024, respectively.

== Career statistics ==
As of match played 15 August 2026

Appearances and goals by club, season and competition
Club	Season	League			National cup (Note: Includes Coppa Italia, FA Cup)		League cup (Note: Includes EFL Cup)		Europe		Total	
Club	Season	Division	Apps	Goals	Apps	Goals	Apps	Goals	Apps	Goals	Apps	Goals
Atalanta	2020–21	Serie A	0	0	0	0	—		0	0	0	0
Atalanta	2021–22	Serie A	0	0	0	0	—		0	0	0	0
Atalanta	2022–23	Serie A	17	0	0	0	—		—		17	0
Atalanta	2023–24	Serie A	0	0	0	0	—		0	0	0	0
Atalanta	Total		17	0	0	0	—		0	0	17	0
SPAL (loan)	2020–21	Serie B	16	1	3	0	—		—		19	1
Cremonese (loan)	2021–22	Serie B	27	0	1	0	—		—		28	0
Frosinone (loan)	2023–24	Serie A	34	0	3	0	—		—		37	0
Leicester City	2024–25	Premier League	19	1	1	0	3	0	—		23	1
Leicester City	2025–26	Championship	29	1	2	0	0	0	—		31	1
Leicester City	2026–27	League One	1	0	0	0	1	1	—		2	1
Leicester City	Total		49	2	3	0	4	1	—		56	3
Career total			143	3	10	0	4	1	0	0	157	4
