= Gabriele Ferrarini =

Italian footballer (born 2000)

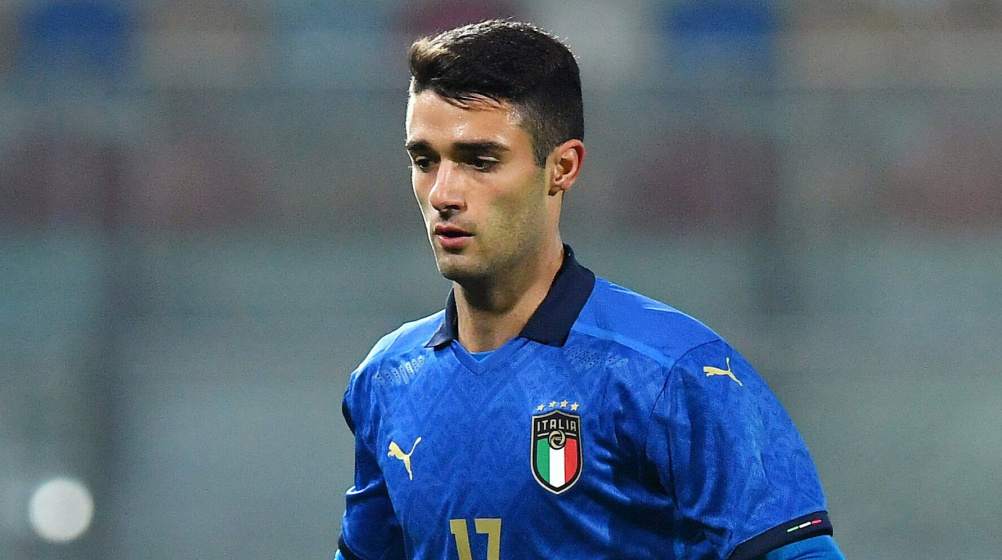

Personal information
- Date of birth: 9 April 2000 (age 26)
- Place of birth: La Spezia, Italy
- Height: 1.80 m (5 ft 11 in)
- Position: Right-back

Team information
- Current team: AlbinoLeffe

Youth career
- –2019: Fiorentina

Senior career*
Years	Team	Apps	(Gls)
2019–2025	Fiorentina	0	(0)
2019–2020	→ Pistoiese (loan)	24	(1)
2020–2021	→ Venezia (loan)	14	(0)
2021–2022	→ Perugia (loan)	32	(1)
2022–2023	→ Monza (loan)	0	(0)
2023	→ Modena (loan)	0	(0)
2023–2024	→ Feralpisalò (loan)	3	(0)
2025	Rimini	6	(0)
2026–	AlbinoLeffe	0	(0)

International career^{‡}
2017–2018	Italy U18	11	(0)
2019	Italy U19	3	(0)
2019	Italy U20	2	(0)
2021	Italy U21	4	(0)
- * Club domestic league appearances and goals as of 19 March 2026 ‡ National team caps and goals as of 18:41, 16 November 2021 (UTC)

Gabriele Ferrarini (born 9 April 2000) is an Italian professional footballer who plays as a right-back for Serie C club AlbinoLeffe.

== Club career ==
=== Fiorentina ===
He is a product of Fiorentina youth teams and started playing for their Under-19 squad in the 2017–18 season.

For the last three games of the 2018–19 Serie A season, he was called up to the senior squad but remained on the bench.

==== Loan to Pistoiese ====
On 29 August 2019 he joined Serie C club Pistoiese on a season-long loan.

He made his professional Serie C debut for Pistoiese on 1 September 2019 in a game against Pergolettese. He started the game and played the whole match. He scored his first professional goal on 21 September 2019 in a 1–1 draw with Como.

==== Loan to Venezia ====
On 25 August 2020, he became a new Venezia player.

==== Loan to Perugia ====
On 20 August 2021, he joined Perugia on loan.

==== Loans to Monza and Modena ====
On 1 September 2022, Ferrarini moved on loan to newly-promoted Serie A side Monza. He only made two bench appearances for Monza and never saw any time on the field. On 31 January 2023, he moved on a new loan to Modena in Serie B.

==== Loan to Feralpisalò ====
On 22 July 2023 he joined Feralpisalò on loan.

== International career ==
He was first called up to represent his country for Under-18 squad friendlies in 2017.

He was included in the 2019 UEFA European Under-19 Championship squad and played in all 3 games, the last 2 as a starter, as Italy was eliminated at the group stage.

On 3 September 2021 he made his debut with the Italy U21 squad, playing as a substitute in the qualifying match won 3–0 against Luxembourg.

== Career statistics ==
=== Club ===
As of match played 14 May 2022

Appearances and goals by club, season, and competition
Club	Season	League			Coppa Italia		Other		Total	
Club	Season	Division	Apps	Goals	Apps	Goals	Apps	Goals	Apps	Goals
Pistoiese (loan)	2019–20	Serie C	24	1	—		—		24	1
Venezia (loan)	2020–21	Serie B	14	0	1	0	3 (Note: Appearances in promotion play-offs)	0	18	0
Perugia (loan)	2021–22	Serie B	31	1	0	0	1	0	32	1
Monza (loan)	2022–23	Serie A	0	0	0	0	—		0	0
Career total			69	2	1	0	4	0	74	2
