= Luca Strizzolo =

Italian footballer

Personal information
- Date of birth: 29 April 1992 (age 34)
- Place of birth: Udine, Italy
- Height: 1.88 m (6 ft 2 in)
- Position: Forward

Youth career
- Ancona Udine
- –2011: Pordenone
- 2010–2011: → Novara (loan)

Senior career*
Years	Team	Apps	(Gls)
2011–2014	Pisa	23	(1)
2013	→ Treviso (loan)	13	(1)
2013–2014	→ Real Vicenza (loan)	22	(6)
2014–2015	Lucchese	22	(0)
2015–2016	Pordenone	32	(9)
2016–2019	Cittadella	75	(14)
2019–2023	Cremonese	63	(13)
2019–2020	→ Pordenone (loan)	28	(8)
2022–2023	→ Perugia (loan)	15	(3)
2023	→ Modena (loan)	17	(5)
2023–2026	Modena	26	(6)
2024–2025	→ Cosenza (loan)	16	(1)
2025	→ Triestina (loan)	10	(1)
- * Club domestic league appearances and goals as of 8 May 2026

Luca Strizzolo (born 29 April 1992) is an Italian professional footballer who plays as a forward.

== Club career ==
He made his professional debut in the Lega Pro for Pisa on 25 September 2011 in a game against Pro Vercelli.

On 18 January 2013, he was loaned to Treviso in Serie C.

On 12 July 2019, he returned to Pordenone on loan for the 2019–20 season.

On 18 August 2022, Strizzolo was loaned to Perugia, with an option to buy. On 10 January 2023, he moved on a new loan to Modena.

On 17 July 2023, Strizzolo returned to Modena on a permanent basis and signed a two-year contract.

On 30 August 2024, Strizzolo moved to Cosenza on loan with an option to buy. On 3 February 2025, Strizzolo joined Triestina on loan with an option to buy and an obligation to buy in case of promotion to Serie B.
