= Leonardo Sernicola =

Italian footballer

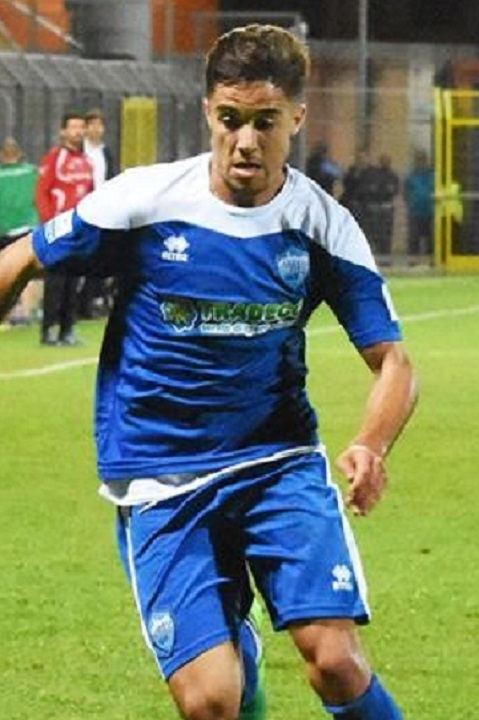

Personal information
- Full name: Leonardo Sernicola
- Date of birth: 30 July 1997 (age 29)
- Place of birth: Civita Castellana, Italy
- Height: 1.88 m (6 ft 2 in)
- Position: Left back

Team information
- Current team: Benevento

Youth career
- –2016: Ternana

Senior career*
Years	Team	Apps	(Gls)
2016–2018	Ternana	9	(0)
2017	→ Fondi (loan)	5	(0)
2017–2018	→ Matera (loan)	34	(3)
2018–2022	Sassuolo	1	(0)
2019–2020	→ Virtus Entella (loan)	5	(1)
2020	→ Ascoli (loan)	14	(0)
2020–2021	→ SPAL (loan)	29	(0)
2021–2022	→ Cremonese (loan)	33	(0)
2022–2026	Cremonese	86	(5)
2025	→ Pisa (loan)	13	(1)
2026	→ Spezia (loan)	20	(1)
2026–	Benevento	0	(0)

International career
2016–2017	Italy U20	9	(0)
Medal record
Men's football
Representing Italy
FIFA U-20 World Cup
Third place	2017 South Korea
- * Club domestic league appearances and goals as of 13 May 2026

Leonardo Sernicola (born 30 July 1997) is an Italian footballer who plays as a left back for Serie B club Benevento.

== Club career ==
=== Early career ===
Sernicola was born in Civita Castellana in Italy's Lazio region. In his youth, the youth teams of local Serie A giants Lazio and Roma were interested in the young defender, but judged him to be too small and slight to play professionally. He also had an unsuccessful trial with Perugia, before signing with the youth teams of Ternana across the border in Umbria. He went on to make nearly 50 appearances for the Primavera side.

=== Ternana ===
Sernicola played at various age levels within the Ternana youth setup, and his physical growth of 20 cm in two years allowed him to compete with larger opponents, contrary to the beliefs of teams that refused him. He now stands at 1.88 m (6 ft 2 in). In 2016, he was promoted to the first team at the end of the 2015–16 season and remained with the team as the Rossoverdi prepared for the 2016–17 season. He made his debut for the first team on 7 May 2016, coming on as a substitute for Fabiano Santacroce in the 63rd minute of a 1–1 draw with Cesena. He played the full 90 minutes of the next two games; the final two games of the season. He did not play as regularly in the 2016–17 season, and subsequently made a loan move in January 2017 to Fondi of Lega Pro. His debut for Fondi came as a substitute in a 1–1 draw with Catania on 23 January 2017.

=== Sassuolo ===
On 28 June 2018, Sernicola signed with Serie A team Sassuolo. On 9 July 2019, he joined to Virtus Entella until 30 June 2020. On 29 January 2020, he moved on another loan to Ascoli. On 25 September 2020 he joined SPAL on loan.

==== Loan to Cremonese ====
On 20 July 2021 Sernicola was loaned to Cremonese.

=== Cremonese ===
On 8 July 2022, Cremonese announced the signing of Sernicola on a permanent deal.

On 23 January 2025, Sernicola joined Pisa on loan with an option to buy.

On 4 January 2026, Sernicola moved on a new loan to Spezia.

=== Benevento ===
On 14 July 2026, Sernicola signed a three-year contract with Benevento.

== Honours ==
Italy U20

- FIFA U-20 World Cup third place: 2017

== Career statistics ==
As of match played 8 April 2023

Appearances and goals by club, season and competition
Club	Season	League			Cup		Total	
Club	Season	Division	Apps	Goals	Apps	Goals	Apps	Goals
Ternara	2015–16	Serie B	3	0	2	0	5	0
Ternara	2016–17	Serie B	6	0	1	0	7	0
Ternara	Total		9	0	3	0	12	0
Fondi (loan)	2016–17	Serie C	5	0	0	0	5	0
Matera (loan)	2017–18	Serie C	34	3	0	0	34	3
Sassuolo	2018–19	Serie A	1	0	0	0	1	0
Virtus Entella (loan)	2019–20	Serie B	5	1	1	0	6	1
Ascoli (loan)	2020	Serie B	14	0	0	0	14	0
SPAL (loan)	2020–21	Serie B	21	0	5	0	26	0
Cremonese (loan)	2021–22	Serie B	33	0	1	0	34	0
Cremonese	2022–23	Serie A	24	2	3	2	27	4
Cremonese	Total		57	2	4	2	61	4
Career total			146	6	13	2	159	8
