= Gianmaria Zanandrea =

Italian footballer (born 1999)

Personal information
- Date of birth: 26 May 1999 (age 27)
- Place of birth: Noventa Vicentina, Italy
- Height: 1.83 m (6 ft 0 in)
- Position: Defender

Team information
- Current team: Torres
- Number: 44

Youth career
- –2013: Vicenza
- 2013–2018: Juventus
- 2017: → Genoa (loan)

Senior career*
Years	Team	Apps	(Gls)
2018–2020	Juventus U23	10	(0)
2020–2022	Mantova	29	(1)
2021–2022	→ Perugia (loan)	11	(1)
2022–2023	Avellino	11	(0)
2023	→ Piacenza (loan)	7	(0)
2023–2025	Legnago	26	(1)
2026–	Torres	4	(1)

International career^{‡}
2014	Italy U15	6	(0)
2014–2015	Italy U16	10	(1)
2016	Italy U17	2	(0)
2016–2017	Italy U18	6	(0)
2017–2018	Italy U19	5	(0)
- * Club domestic league appearances and goals as of 27 April 2026 ‡ National team caps and goals as of 29 July 2018

Gianmaria Zanandrea (born 26 May 1999) is an Italian professional footballer who plays as a defender for Serie C Group B club Torres.

== Club career ==
He made his Serie C debut for Juventus U23 on 24 September 2018 in a game against Carrarese.

On 18 August 2020, he joined Mantova, newly promoted to Serie C.

On 31 August 2021, he joined Perugia on loan.

On 3 August 2022, he joined Avellino on permanent basis. On 31 January 2023, Zanandrea moved on loan to Piacenza.

On 18 August 2023, Zanandrea signed a two-year contract with Legnago.

== International ==
He represented Italy at the 2018 UEFA European Under-19 Championship, in which Italy was the runner-up.
