= Marcos Curado =

Argentine professional footballer

Personal information
- Date of birth: 9 May 1995 (age 31)
- Place of birth: Mar del Plata, Argentina
- Height: 1.86 m (6 ft 1 in)
- Position: Centre-back

Team information
- Current team: Ascoli
- Number: 30

Senior career*
Years	Team	Apps	(Gls)
2014–2018	Arsenal de Sarandí	75	(3)
2018–2022	Genoa	0	(0)
2018	→ Avellino (loan)	0	(0)
2018–2019	→ Crotone (loan)	16	(0)
2019–2020	→ Crotone (loan)	12	(0)
2020–2021	→ Frosinone (loan)	16	(0)
2021–2022	→ Perugia (loan)	25	(2)
2022–2023	Perugia	30	(0)
2023–2024	Catania	25	(1)
2024–	Ascoli	47	(1)
- * Club domestic league appearances and goals as of 30 April 2026

Marcos Curado (born 9 May 1995) is an Argentine professional footballer who plays as a centre-back for Serie B club Ascoli.

He also holds Italian citizenship.

== Career ==
Curado's first appearance for Argentine Primera División club Arsenal de Sarandí came on 11 August 2014 when he was on the bench during a win over Estudiantes. His first appearance in a match for Arsenal was in the following season, 2015, in a draw against Unión Santa Fe. He played in a further sixteen league matches in 2015 before participating in another sixteen in the 2016 Argentine Primera División season. In July 2018, Curado was signed by Serie A's Genoa. He was immediately loaned to Avellino of Serie B. Despite featuring in a friendly against Roma on 20 July, Curado left Avellino to join Crotone on loan in August.

After seventeen total games for Crotone, Curado returned to Genoa at the end of June. However, on 10 July, Crotone announced a fresh loan deal for the centre-back. He'd appear twelve times for them in 2019–20. On 2 October 2020, Curado was again loaned out by Genoa as he agreed to join Frosinone of Serie B. He made his debut a day later, playing the full duration of a two-goal victory away to Venezia.

On 7 July 2021, he joined Perugia on loan with an obligation to buy.

On 11 August 2023, Curado moved to Catania.

On 28 August 2024, Curado signed a two-season contract with Ascoli.

== Career statistics ==
As of match played 3 October 2020.

Club statistics
Club	Season	League			Cup		League Cup		Continental		Other		Total	
Club	Season	Division	Apps	Goals	Apps	Goals	Apps	Goals	Apps	Goals	Apps	Goals	Apps	Goals
Arsenal de Sarandí	2014	Primera División	0	0	0	0	—		0	0	0	0	0	0
Arsenal de Sarandí	2015	Primera División	17	0	0	0	—		0	0	0	0	17	0
Arsenal de Sarandí	2016	Primera División	16	0	1	0	—		—		0	0	17	0
Arsenal de Sarandí	2016–17	Primera División	24	2	2	0	—		1 (Note: Appearance(s) in the Copa Sudamericana)	0	0	0	27	2
Arsenal de Sarandí	2017–18	Primera División	18	1	1	0	—		2	0	0	0	21	1
Arsenal de Sarandí	Total		75	3	4	0	—		3	0	0	0	82	3
Genoa	2018–19	Serie A	0	0	0	0	—		—		0	0	0	0
Genoa	2019–20	Serie A	0	0	0	0	—		—		0	0	0	0
Genoa	Total		0	0	0	0	—		—		0	0	0	0
Avellino (loan)	2018–19	Serie B	0	0	0	0	—		—		0	0	0	0
Crotone (loan)	2018–19	Serie B	16	0	1	0	—		—		0	0	17	0
Crotone (loan)	2019–20	Serie B	12	0	0	0	—		—		0	0	12	0
Crotone (loan)	Total		28	0	1	0	—		—		0	0	29	0
Frosinone (loan)	2020–21	Serie B	1	0	0	0	—		—		0	0	1	0
Career total			104	3	5	0	—		3	0	0	0	112	3
