= Samuele Righetti =

Italian footballer

Personal information
- Date of birth: 10 October 2001 (age 25)
- Place of birth: Perugia, Italy
- Height: 1.82 m (6 ft 0 in)
- Position: Defender

Team information
- Current team: Arezzo
- Number: 37

Youth career
- –2018: Torino
- 2018–2020: Perugia

Senior career*
| Years | Team | Apps | (Gls) |
| 2020–2023 | Perugia | 8 | (0) |
| 2020–2021 | → Aglianese (loan) | 26 | (2) |
| 2022 | → Gubbio (loan) | 10 | (0) |
| 2023 | → Cerignola (loan) | 11 | (0) |
| 2023–2024 | Lumezzane | 30 | (0) |
| 2024– | Arezzo | 67 | (0) |
- * Club domestic league appearances and goals as of 30 April 2026

Samuele Righetti (born 10 October 2001) is an Italian professional footballer who plays as a defender for Serie B club Arezzo.

== Club career ==
He joined the Under-19 squad of Perugia in the 2018–19 season. In the 2019–20 season, he began to receive call-ups to Perugia's senior squad for Serie B games, but did not make his debut that season. On 30 September 2020, he made his first appearance for Perugia in a Coppa Italia 4–1 victory over Ascoli.

On 5 October 2020, he was loaned to Serie D club Aglianese for the 2020–21 season.

Upon his return from loan, he made his Serie B debut for Perugia on 21 August 2021 in a game against Pordenone.

On 31 January 2022, Righetti joined Gubbio on loan.

On 24 January 2023, Righetti moved on loan to Serie C club Cerignola.

On 19 August 2024, Righetti signed a one-season deal with Arezzo.
