= Michele Castagnetti =

Italian professional footballer

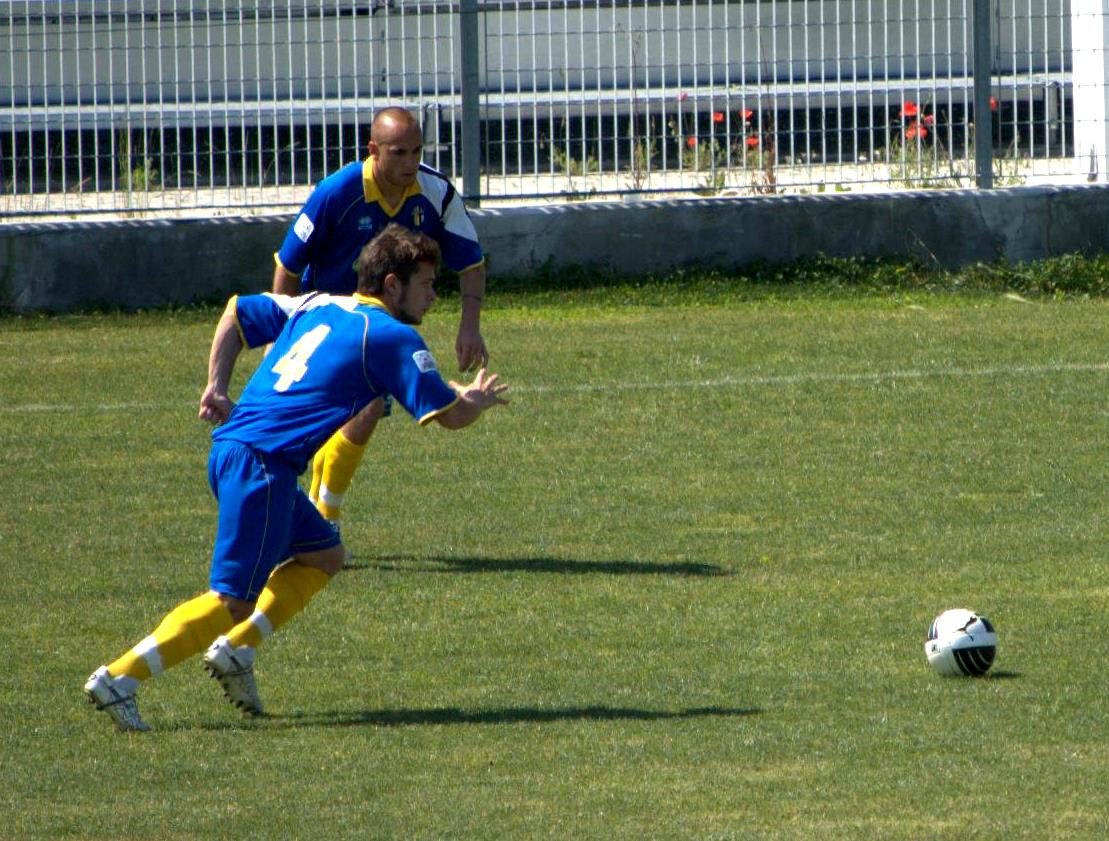

Personal information
- Date of birth: 27 December 1989 (age 36)
- Place of birth: Montecchio Emilia, Italy
- Height: 1.80 m (5 ft 11 in)
- Position: Defensive midfielder

Team information
- Current team: Reggiana

Youth career
- 2006–2008: Termolan Bibbiano
- 2007–2008: → Mantova (loan)

Senior career*
Years	Team	Apps	(Gls)
2008–2011	Crociati Noceto	83	(5)
2011–2013	FeralpiSalò	57	(5)
2013–2014	Cosenza	10	(0)
2014–2015	Carrarese	44	(3)
2015–2018	SPAL	61	(3)
2017–2018	→ Empoli (loan)	39	(1)
2018–2025	Cremonese	197	(8)
2025–2026	Cesena	30	(1)
2026–	Reggiana	0	(0)
- * Club domestic league appearances and goals as of 13 May 2026

Michele Castagnetti (born 27 December 1989) is an Italian professional footballer who plays as a defensive midfielder for Serie C Group B club Reggiana.

== Biography ==
Michele started his career at U.S. Montecchio before moving to Termolan Bibbiano, an Italian amateur team, where he played in the Eccellenza Emilia-Romagna league. In August 2007 he signed for the Serie B team Mantova. At Mantova he joined the Primavera squad. After completing that season he left for Crociati Noceto where he won the Serie D Group D.

Following that season, Michele kept playing in Noceto and completed two season in Seconda Divisione. After Crociati Noceto withdrew from 2011–12 Lega Pro Seconda Divisione. he joined Prima Divisione newcomer FeralpiSalò where he met Andrea Tedeschi who trained him at Termolan Bibbiano.

In September 2013 he signes for the Seconda Divisione team Cosenza Calcio.

In January 2014 he returns in Prima Divisione signing for Carrarese Calcio.

On 2 July 2018 he signed a three-year contract with Serie B club Cremonese. On 16 March 2021, he scored a goal from 70 yards out against Virtus Entella.

On 16 March 2021 he scored an extraordinary goal deep from within his own half after the ball bounced once after a clearance from Virtus Entella's goalkeeper. Castagnetti struck the ball sweetly and ferociously with his left foot as it looped high over everyone on the pitch, including Entella's keeper. The ball didn't bounce after leaving his foot and ending up in the back of the net that healed his side won 2–1.

== Honours ==
=== Crociati Noceto ===
- Serie D: 2008–09

=== SPAL ===
- Serie C: 2015–16
- Serie B: 2016–17
