= Kalifa Manneh =

Gambian footballer (born 1998)

Personal information
- Date of birth: 2 September 1998 (age 28)
- Place of birth: Serekunda, Gambia
- Height: 1.72 m (5 ft 8 in)
- Position: Winger

Team information
- Current team: Nocerina
- Number: 7

Youth career
- 2013–2017: Catania

Senior career*
Years	Team	Apps	(Gls)
2017–2021	Catania	75	(6)
2019–2020	→ Carrarese (loan)	14	(1)
2021–2023	Perugia	1	(0)
2022	→ Taranto (loan)	12	(0)
2023–2024	Alessandria	3	(0)
2024	Foggia	5	(0)
2024-2026	Nocerina	0	(0)
2026–	Mazzarone	0	(0)

International career^{‡}
2019–	Gambia	1	(0)
- * Club domestic league appearances and goals as of 29 September 2024 ‡ National team caps and goals as of 13 October 2019

Kalifa Manneh (born 2 September 1998) is a Gambian professional footballer who plays as a winger for Italian Serie D club Nocerina.

== Club career ==
At the age of 15, Manneh escaped Gambia in a boat and landed in Sicily as a refugee. That year, he auditioned for Catania and joined their youth academy. Manneh made his professional debut with Catania in a 0-0 Serie C tie with Juve Stabia on 14 May 2017.

On 3 January 2020, Carrarese terminated the loan agreement with Catania.

On 15 July 2021, he signed a three-year contract with Perugia. On 31 January 2022, Manneh was loaned to Taranto.

On 31 August 2023, Manneh signed with Alessandria for one season. On 30 January 2024, Manneh moved to Foggia.

== International career ==
Manneh debuted for the Gambia national football team in a friendly 1–0 win over Guinea on 7 June 2019.
