= Filippo Sgarbi =

Italian footballer (born 1997)

Personal information
- Full name: Filippo Lorenzo Sgarbi
- Date of birth: 29 December 1997 (age 28)
- Place of birth: Varese, Italy
- Height: 1.91 m (6 ft 3 in)
- Position: Central defender

Team information
- Current team: Padova
- Number: 32

Youth career
- –2018: Inter Milan
- 2015–2016: → Vicenza (loan)

Senior career*
Years	Team	Apps	(Gls)
2016–2018	Inter Milan	0	(0)
2016–2017	→ Caronnese (loan)	31	(1)
2017–2018	→ Südtirol (loan)	36	(2)
2018–2023	Perugia	126	(3)
2023–2025	Cosenza	23	(0)
2024	→ Ternana (loan)	9	(1)
2025–	Padova	29	(4)
- * Club domestic league appearances and goals as of 13 May 2026

Filippo Lorenzo Sgarbi (born 29 December 1997) is an Italian professional footballer who plays as a central defender for Serie B club Padova.

== Career ==
On 2 July 2018 he joined Perugia.

On 18 August 2023, Sgarbi signed a two-year contract with Cosenza.

On 25 January 2024, Sgarbi was loaned by Cosenza to Ternana.

On 19 August 2025, Sgarbi joined Padova in Serie B on a two-season contract.
