= Francesco Lisi =

Italian footballer

Personal information
- Date of birth: 3 September 1989 (age 37)
- Place of birth: Rome, Italy
- Height: 1.80 m (5 ft 11 in)
- Position: Midfielder

Youth career
- –2009: Piacenza

Senior career*
Years	Team	Apps	(Gls)
2009–2012	Piacenza	31	(3)
2009–2011	→ Rodengo Saiano (loan)	39	(4)
2012–2013	Como	21	(1)
2013–2014	Bisceglie	10	(0)
2014	Aprilia	9	(0)
2014–2015	Piacenza	32	(8)
2015–2016	Rimini	15	(2)
2016–2018	Juve Stabia	74	(13)
2018–2021	Pisa	109	(7)
2021–2026	Perugia	126	(13)
- * Club domestic league appearances and goals as of 30 April 2026

Francesco Lisi (born 3 September 1989) is an Italian footballer.

== Club career ==
He made his professional Lega Pro Prima Divisione debut in 2011–12 season with Piacenza. He spent the first 10 seasons of his senior career in the third tier or below.

For the 2019–20 season his club Pisa advanced to the second-tier Serie B.

He made his Serie B debut for Pisa on 23 August 2019 in a game against Benevento. He started the game and played the whole match. He scored his first Serie B goal on 28 September 2019 in a 1–1 draw with Venezia.

On 13 July 2021, he signed a three-year contract with Perugia.
