= Christian Kouan =

Ivorian footballer

Personal information
- Full name: Christian Kouan Oulaï
- Date of birth: 20 December 1999 (age 26)
- Place of birth: Abidjan, Ivory Coast
- Height: 1.78 m (5 ft 10 in)
- Position: Midfielder

Team information
- Current team: Benevento
- Number: 56

Senior career*
Years	Team	Apps	(Gls)
2016–2017	Vigor Perconti		
2017–2024	Perugia	169	(21)
2024–2026	Cosenza	55	(5)
2026–	Benevento	11	(0)
- * Club domestic league appearances and goals as of 1 May 2026

Christian Kouan Oulaï (born 20 December 1999), known as Christian Kouan, is an Ivorian professional footballer who plays as a midfielder for Serie B club Benevento.

== Club career ==
He made his Serie B debut for Perugia on 20 January 2018, in a game against Virtus Entella. He also scored on his debut.

On 26 June 2024, Kouan signed a two-season contract with Cosenza, with an optional third season.

== International career ==
On 24 August 2020, he received his first call-up by the Ivory Coast senior national team.
