= 2024–25 ACF Fiorentina season =

Fiorentina
2024–25 season
- Owner: Mediacom
- Chairman: Rocco B. Commisso
- Head coach: Raffaele Palladino
- Stadium: Stadio Artemio Franchi
- Serie A: 6th
- Coppa Italia: Round of 16
- UEFA Conference League: Semi-finals
- Top goalscorer: League: Moise Kean (19); All: Moise Kean (25)
- Highest home attendance: 22,495
- Lowest home attendance: 9,211
- Average home league attendance: 20,410
- Biggest win: 7–0 vs LASK (H); 12 December 2024, UEFA Conference League
- Biggest defeat: 0–3 vs Napoli (H); 4 January 2025, Serie A
| Home colours | Away colours | Third colours |

The 2024–25 season was the 98th season in the history of ACF Fiorentina, and the club's 21st consecutive season in the Italian top flight. In addition to the domestic league, the club participated in the Coppa Italia and the UEFA Conference League.

At the end of the 2023–24 season, head coach Vincenzo Italiano joined Bologna to become their head coach. Raffaele Palladino replaced him as the new head coach of Fiorentina.

== Squad information ==
Players and squad numbers last updated on 25 May 2025. Appearances include all competitions. Note: Flags indicate national team as has been defined under FIFA eligibility rules. Players may hold more than one non-FIFA nationality.

| No. | Player | Nat. | Position(s) | Date of birth (age) | Signed in | Contract ends | Signed from | Transfer fee | Apps. | Goals |
Goalkeepers
| 1 | Pietro Terracciano | (Italy) | GK | 8 March 1990 (aged 35) | 2019 | 2026 | (Italy) Empoli | Free | 156 | 0 |
| 30 | Tommaso Martinelli | (Italy) | GK | 6 January 2006 (aged 19) | 2023 | 2026 | (Italy) Youth Sector | N/A | 2 | 0 |
| 43 | David de Gea | (Spain) | GK | 7 November 1990 (aged 34) | 2024 | 2025 | Unattached | Free | 42 | 0 |
Defenders
| 2 | Dodô | (Brazil) | RB | 17 November 1998 (aged 26) | 2022 | 2027 | (Ukraine) Shakhtar Donetsk | €14.5M | 114 | 1 |
| 5 | Marin Pongračić | (Croatia) | CB | 11 September 1997 (aged 27) | 2024 | 2029 | (Italy) Lecce | €15M | 28 | 0 |
| 6 | Luca Ranieri | (Italy) | CB / LB | 23 April 1999 (aged 26) | 2018 | 2028 | (Italy) Youth Sector | N/A | 115 | 8 |
| 15 | Pietro Comuzzo | (Italy) | CB | 10 February 2005 (aged 20) | 2023 | 2025 | (Italy) Youth Sector | N/A | 50 | 1 |
| 17 | Niccolò Fortini | (Italy) | LB | 13 February 2006 (aged 19) | 2023 | 2027 | (Italy) Youth Sector | N/A | 0 | 0 |
| 18 | Pablo Marí | (Spain) | CB | 31 August 1993 (aged 31) | 2025 | 2026 | (Italy) Monza | €1.8M | 13 | 0 |
| 21 | Robin Gosens | (Germany) | LB / LM | 5 July 1994 (aged 30) | 2024 | 2025 | (Germany) Union Berlin | Loan (€0.75M) | 41 | 8 |
| 22 | Matías Moreno | (Argentina) | CB | 24 September 2003 (aged 21) | 2024 | 2029 | (Argentina) Belgrano | €5M | 12 | 0 |
| 61 | Leonardo Baroncelli | (Italy) | CB | 13 August 2005 (aged 19) | 2022 | 2027 | (Italy) Youth Sector | N/A | 0 | 0 |
| 65 | Fabiano Parisi | (Italy) | LB / LM | 9 November 2000 (aged 24) | 2023 | 2028 | (Italy) Empoli | €10M | 73 | 2 |
Midfielders
| 4 | Edoardo Bove | (Italy) | CM | 16 May 2002 (aged 23) | 2024 | 2025 | (Italy) Roma | Loan (€1.5M) | 15 | 1 |
| 8 | Rolando Mandragora | (Italy) | DM / CM | 29 June 1997 (aged 28) | 2022 | 2026 | (Italy) Juventus | €8.2M | 142 | 18 |
| 23 | Andrea Colpani | (Italy) | CM / AM / RW | 11 May 1999 (aged 26) | 2024 | 2025 | (Italy) Monza | Loan (€4M) | 33 | 2 |
| 24 | Amir Richardson | (Morocco) | CM | 24 January 2002 (aged 23) | 2024 | 2029 | (France) Reims | N/A | 39 | 2 |
| 27 | Cher Ndour | (Italy) | CM | 27 July 2004 (aged 20) | 2025 | 2029 | (France) Paris Saint-Germain | €5M | 9 | 0 |
| 29 | Yacine Adli | (France) | DM / CM / AM | 29 July 2000 (aged 24) | 2024 | 2025 | (Italy) Milan | Loan (€2M) | 35 | 5 |
| 32 | Danilo Cataldi | (Italy) | DM / CM | 6 August 1994 (aged 30) | 2024 | 2025 | (Italy) Lazio | Loan (€1M) | 33 | 3 |
| 44 | Nicolò Fagioli | (Italy) | CM / AM | 12 February 2001 (aged 24) | 2025 | 2025 | (Italy) Juventus | Loan (€2.5M) | 21 | 2 |
| 64 | Jonas Harder | (Italy) | CM | 30 September 2005 (aged 19) | 2024 | | (Italy) Youth Sector | N/A | 1 | 0 |
| 90 | Michael Folorunsho | (Italy) | CM / AM | 7 February 1998 (aged 27) | 2025 | 2025 | (Italy) Napoli | Loan (€1M) | 19 | 0 |
Forwards
| 9 | Lucas Beltrán | (Argentina) | ST / AM | 29 March 2001 (aged 24) | 2023 | 2028 | (Argentina) River Plate | €12M | 98 | 16 |
| 10 | Albert Guðmundsson | (Iceland) | ST / RW / AM / LW | 6 December 1997 (aged 27) | 2024 | 2025 | (Italy) Genoa | Loan (€8M) | 33 | 8 |
| 17 | Nicolò Zaniolo | (Italy) | RW / AM | 2 July 1999 (aged 25) | 2025 | 2025 | (Turkey) Galatasaray | Loan (€3.2M) | 13 | 0 |
| 20 | Moise Kean | (Italy) | ST | 28 February 2000 (aged 25) | 2024 | 2029 | (Italy) Juventus | €13M | 44 | 25 |
| 63 | Maat Daniel Caprini | (Italy) | LW / ST | 11 February 2006 (aged 19) | 2024 | | (Italy) Youth Sector | N/A | 2 | 0 |
| 66 | Tommaso Rubino | (Italy) | ST / AM | 10 November 2006 (aged 18) | 2024 | 2029 | (Italy) Youth Sector | N/A | 2 | 0 |

== Transfers ==
=== Summer window ===
==== In ====
| Date | Pos. | Player | Age | Moving from | Fee | Notes | Ref. |
|---|---|---|---|---|---|---|---|
| 9 July 2024 | FW | (Italy) Moise Kean | 24 | (Italy) Juventus | €13,000,000 | | |
| 19 July 2024 | DF | (Croatia) Marin Pongračić | 26 | (Italy) Lecce | €15,000,000 | | |
| 7 August 2024 | DF | (Italy) Edoardo Pierozzi | 22 | (Italy) Taranto | Free | Loan terminated after changes in Taranto's management | |
| 9 August 2024 | GK | (Spain) David de Gea | 33 | Unattached | Free | | |
| 12 August 2024 | MF | (Morocco) Amir Richardson | 22 | (France) Reims | €9,000,000 | | |
| 30 August 2024 | DF | (Italy) Lorenzo Lucchesi | 21 | (Italy) Venezia | Free | Loan terminated | |
| 30 August 2024 | DF | (Argentina) Matías Moreno | 20 | (Argentina) Belgrano | €5,000,000 | | |

==== Loans in ====
| Date | Pos. | Player | Age | Moving from | Fee | Notes | Ref. |
|---|---|---|---|---|---|---|---|
| 26 July 2024 | MF | (Italy) Andrea Colpani | 25 | (Italy) Monza | €4,000,000 | Option to buy for €12,000,000 | |
| 16 August 2024 | FW | (Iceland) Albert Guðmundsson | 27 | (Italy) Genoa | €8,000,000 | Option to buy for €17,000,000 | |
| 28 August 2024 | MF | (France) Yacine Adli | 24 | (Italy) Milan | €1,500,000 | Option to buy for €10,000,000 | |
| 30 August 2024 | MF | (Italy) Edoardo Bove | 22 | (Italy) Roma | €1,500,000 | Option to buy for €10,500,000 | |
| 30 August 2024 | MF | (Italy) Danilo Cataldi | 30 | (Italy) Lazio | €1,000,000 | Option to buy for €5,000,000 | |
| 30 August 2024 | MF | (Germany) Robin Gosens | 30 | (Germany) Union Berlin | €750,000 | Option to buy for €7,500,000 | |

==== Out ====
| Date | Pos. | Player | Age | Moving to | Fee | Notes | Ref. |
|---|---|---|---|---|---|---|---|
| 30 June 2024 | MF | (Brazil) Arthur Melo | 27 | (Italy) Juventus | Free | Loan return | |
| 30 June 2024 | MF | (France) Maxime Lopez | 26 | (Italy) Sassuolo | Free | Loan return | |
| 30 June 2024 | FW | (Italy) Andrea Belotti | 30 | (Italy) Roma | Free | Loan return | |
| 30 June 2024 | DF | (Italy) Davide Faraoni | 32 | (Italy) Hellas Verona | Free | Loan return | |
| 1 July 2024 | MF | (Italy) Giacomo Bonaventura | 34 | (Saudi Arabia) Al Shabab | Free | End of contract | |
| 1 July 2024 | MF | (Italy) Gaetano Castrovilli | 27 | (Italy) Lazio | Free | End of contract | |
| 1 July 2024 | DF | (Italy) Christian Dalle Mura | 22 | (Italy) Cosenza | Free | End of contract | |
| 1 July 2024 | MF | (Ghana) Alfred Duncan | 31 | (Italy) Venezia | Free | End of contract | |
| 1 July 2024 | FW | (Russia) Aleksandr Kokorin | 33 | (Cyprus) Aris Limassol | Free | End of contract | |
| 18 July 2024 | DF | (Serbia) Nikola Milenković | 26 | (England) Nottingham Forest | €14,300,000 | | |
| 19 July 2024 | MF | (Italy) Mattia Fiorini | 23 | (Italy) Rimini | Free | | |
| 25 July 2024 | DF | (Italy) Niccolò Pierozzi | 22 | (Italy) Palermo | €1,000,000 | | |
| 31 July 2024 | FW | (Romania) Louis Munteanu | 22 | (Romania) CFR Cluj | €2,300,000 | | |
| 2 August 2024 | FW | (Italy) Destiny Egharevba | 21 | (Italy) Renate | Free | | |

==== Loans out ====
| Date | Pos. | Player | Age | Moving to | Fee | Notes | Ref. |
|---|---|---|---|---|---|---|---|
| 5 July 2024 | MF | (Italy) Costantino Favasuli | 20 | (Italy) Bari | Free | | |
| 9 July 2024 | DF | (Italy) Davide Gentile | 20 | (Italy) Salernitana | Free | | |
| 15 July 2024 | MF | (Italy) Niccolò Nardi | 20 | (Italy) Carpi | Free | | |
| 22 July 2024 | DF | (Italy) Edoardo Pierozzi | 22 | (Italy) Taranto | Free | | |
| 26 July 2024 | DF | (Italy) Christian Biagetti | 20 | (Italy) Pro Vercelli | Free | | |
| 26 July 2024 | FW | (Italy) Filippo Distefano | 20 | (Italy) Frosinone | Free | | |
| 26 July 2024 | DF | (Italy) Bruno Prati | 20 | (Italy) Zenith Prato | Free | | |
| 26 July 2024 | MF | (Italy) Lorenzo Vigiani | 20 | (Italy) Pro Vercelli | Free | | |
| 27 July 2024 | FW | (Albania) Eljon Toçi | 21 | (Italy) Pro Patria | Free | | |
| 30 July 2024 | MF | (Italy) Lorenzo Amatucci | 20 | (Italy) Salernitana | Free | | |
| 30 July 2024 | DF | (Romania) Eduard Duțu | 23 | (Italy) Pineto | Free | | |
| 31 July 2024 | FW | (Senegal) Fallou Sene | 19 | (Italy) Frosinone | Free | | |
| 1 August 2024 | DF | (Italy) Lorenzo Lucchesi | 21 | (Italy) Venezia | Free | | |
| 8 August 2024 | DF | (Italy) Edoardo Pierozzi | 22 | (Italy) Pescara | Free | Loan was terminated after changes in Taranto's management | |
| 9 August 2024 | FW | (Angola) M'Bala Nzola | 27 | (France) Lens | €2,100,000 | Option to buy for €10,000,000 | |
| 25 August 2024 | FW | (Argentina) Nicolás González | 26 | (Italy) Juventus | €8,400,000 | Option to buy for €25,000,000 | |
| 30 August 2024 | MF | (Italy) Alessandro Bianco | 21 | (Italy) Monza | Free | | |
| 30 August 2024 | DF | (Bulgaria) Dimo Krastev | 21 | (Italy) Ternana | Free | | |
| 30 August 2024 | DF | (Italy) Lorenzo Lucchesi | 21 | (Italy) Reggiana | Free | | |
| 31 August 2024 | MF | (Morocco) Sofyan Amrabat | 28 | (Turkey) Fenerbahçe | €2,000,000 | Option to buy for €13,000,000 | |
| 7 September 2024 | MF | (Czech Republic) Antonín Barák | 29 | (Turkey) Kasımpaşa | Free | Option to buy for €6,000,000 | |
| 7 September 2024 | FW | (Croatia) Josip Brekalo | 26 | (Turkey) Kasımpaşa | Free | Option to buy for €3,000,000 | |
| 30 September 2024 | MF | (Morocco) Abdelhamid Sabiri | 27 | (United Arab Emirates) Ajman | Free | Option to buy for €3,000,000 | |
| 1 October 2024 | MF | (Argentina) Gino Infantino | 21 | (United Arab Emirates) Al Ain | Free | Option to buy for €7,000,000 | |

=== Winter window ===
==== In ====
| Date | Pos. | Player | Age | Moving from | Fee | Notes | Ref. |
|---|---|---|---|---|---|---|---|
| 17 December 2024 | DF | (Italy) Bruno Prati | 20 | (Italy) Zenith Prato | Free | Loan return | |
| 1 January 2025 | DF | (Argentina) Nicolás Valentini | 23 | (Argentina) Boca Juniors | Free | | |
| 9 January 2025 | MF | (Italy) Niccolò Nardi | 20 | (Italy) Carpi | Free | Loan return | |
| 15 January 2025 | DF | (Italy) Christian Biagetti | 20 | (Italy) Pro Vercelli | Free | Loan return | |
| 23 January 2025 | DF | (Romania) Eduard Duțu | 23 | (Italy) Pineto | Free | Loan return | |
| 28 January 2025 | DF | (Spain) Pablo Marí | 31 | (Italy) Monza | €1,800,000 | | |
| 29 January 2025 | MF | (Morocco) Abdelhamid Sabiri | 27 | (United Arab Emirates) Ajman | Free | Loan return | |
| 3 February 2025 | MF | (Italy) Cher Ndour | 20 | (France) Paris Saint-Germain | €5,000,000 | | |

==== Loans in ====
| Date | Pos. | Player | Age | Moving from | Fee | Notes | Ref. |
|---|---|---|---|---|---|---|---|
| 11 January 2025 | MF | (Italy) Michael Folorunsho | 26 | (Italy) Napoli | €1,000,000 | Option to buy for €8,000,000 | |
| 3 February 2025 | FW | (Italy) Nicolò Zaniolo | 25 | (Turkey) Galatasaray | €3,200,000 | Option to buy for €15,500,000 | |
| 4 February 2025 | MF | (Italy) Nicolò Fagioli | 23 | (Italy) Juventus | €2,500,000 | Option to buy for €13,500,000 | |

==== Out ====
| Date | Pos. | Player | Age | Moving to | Fee | Notes | Ref. |
|---|---|---|---|---|---|---|---|
| 20 December 2024 | DF | (Italy) Bruno Prati | 20 | (Italy) Buggianese | Free | | |
| 7 January 2025 | DF | (Argentina) Lucas Martínez Quarta | 28 | (Argentina) River Plate | €7,000,000 | | |

==== Loans out ====
| Date | Pos. | Player | Age | Moving to | Fee | Notes | Ref. |
|---|---|---|---|---|---|---|---|
| 9 January 2025 | MF | (Italy) Niccolò Nardi | 20 | (Italy) Pianese | Free | | |
| 16 January 2025 | DF | (Italy) Christian Biagetti | 20 | (Italy) Sorrento | Free | | |
| 24 January 2025 | DF | (Romania) Eduard Duțu | 23 | (Italy) Foggia | Free | | |
| 22 January 2025 | GK | (Denmark) Oliver Christensen | 25 | (Italy) Salernitana | Free | | |
| 24 January 2025 | DF | (Italy) Michael Kayode | 20 | (England) Brentford | Free | Option to buy for €16,000,000 | |
| 30 January 2025 | MF | (Morocco) Abdelhamid Sabiri | 27 | (Saudi Arabia) Al Taawoun | Free | Option to buy for €1,000,000 | |
| 31 January 2025 | FW | (France) Jonathan Ikoné | 26 | (Italy) Como | €1,000,000 | Option to buy for €8,000,000 | |
| 3 February 2025 | FW | (Ivory Coast) Christian Kouamé | 27 | (Italy) Empoli | Free | | |
| 3 February 2025 | DF | (Argentina) Nicolás Valentini | 23 | (Italy) Hellas Verona | Free | | |
| 3 February 2025 | DF | (Italy) Cristiano Biraghi | 32 | (Italy) Torino | Free | Option to buy for €100,000 | |
| 3 February 2025 | FW | (Italy) Riccardo Sottil | 25 | (Italy) Milan | €1,000,000 | Option to buy for €10,000,000 | |

== Friendlies ==
=== Pre-season ===
On 20 June, an away friendly against English side Bolton Wanderers was added.

| 19 July 2024 Friendly | Fiorentina (Italy) | 4–0 | (Italy) Reggiana | Bagno a Ripoli |
| 20:00 CEST (UTC+2) | Sottil 8'; Kean 15'; Kouamé 65', 77' | Report | | Stadium: Stadio Curva Fiesole - Viola Park |

| 26 July 2024 Friendly | Bolton Wanderers (England) | 1–1 | (Italy) Fiorentina | Horwich, England |
| 19:30 BST (UTC+1) | Adeboyejo 66'; Johnston (yellow card) 74' | Report | Brekalo 20'; Ranieri (yellow card) 78'; Rubino (yellow card) 82'; Dodô (yellow card) 86' | Stadium: Toughsheet Community Stadium; Attendance: 6,862; Referee: Bobby Madley (England) |

| 27 July 2024 Friendly | Preston North End (England) | 2–1 | (Italy) Fiorentina | Preston, England |
| 15:00 BST (UTC+1) | Lindsay 23', (yellow card) 30'; Keane 44' | Report | Mandragora 31'; Kouamé (penalty missed) 69' | Stadium: Deepdale; Attendance: 5,516 |

| 30 July 2024 Friendly | Hull City (England) | 2–2 | (Italy) Fiorentina | Kingston upon Hull, England |
| 19:45 BST (UTC+1) | Ömür 73'; Terracciano 80' (o.g.) | Report | Dodô 29'; Kean 52' | Stadium: MKM Stadium; Attendance: 5,455 |

| 4 August 2024 Friendly | Fiorentina (Italy) | 2–1 | (France) Montpellier | Bagno a Ripoli |
| 15:30 CEST (UTC+2) | Barák (yellow card) 7'; Ikoné 42'; Sagnan 71' (o.g.) | Report | Al-Taamari 64' | Stadium: Stadio Curva Fiesole - Viola Park |

| 5 August 2024 Friendly | Grosseto (Italy) | 2–7 | (Italy) Fiorentina | Grosseto |
| 20:00 CEST (UTC+2) | Boiga 30'; Senigagliesi 64' | Report | Pongračić 11'; Kouamé 16', 32', 59'; Kayode 37'; Colpani 45'; Rubino 76' | Stadium: Stadio Olimpico Carlo Zecchini |

| 10 August 2024 Friendly | SC Freiburg (Germany) | 2–2 | (Italy) Fiorentina | Freiburg, Germany |
| 15:30 CEST (UTC+2) | Gregoritsch 122' (pen.); Philipp 130' | Report | Kean 10'; Mandragora 72' (pen.) | Stadium: Europa-Park Stadion; Attendance: 33,300 |
Note: Match was played in three periods of 45 minutes each.

== Competitions ==
=== Overall record ===
| Competition | First match | Last match | Starting round | Final position | Record | | | | | | | |
| Competition | First match | Last match | Starting round | Final position | Pld | W | D | L | GF | GA | GD | Win % |
|---|---|---|---|---|---|---|---|---|---|---|---|---|
| Serie A | 17 August 2024 | 25 May 2025 | Matchday 1 | 6th | 38 | 19 | 8 | 11 | 60 | 41 | +19 | 50.00 |
| Coppa Italia | 4 December 2024 | | Round of 16 | Round of 16 | 1 | 0 | 1 | 0 | 2 | 2 | +0 | 0.00 |
| UEFA Conference League | 22 August 2024 | 8 May 2025 | Play-off round | Semi-finals | 14 | 6 | 5 | 3 | 34 | 22 | +12 | 42.86 |
| Total | | | | | 53 | 25 | 14 | 14 | 96 | 65 | +31 | 47.17 |

Source: Soccerway

=== Serie A ===
==== League table ====
| Pos | Team | Pld | W | D | L | GF | GA | GD | Pts | Qualification or relegation |
|---|---|---|---|---|---|---|---|---|---|---|
| 4 | Juventus | 38 | 18 | 16 | 4 | 58 | 35 | +23 | 70 | Qualification for the Champions League league phase |
| 5 | Roma | 38 | 20 | 9 | 9 | 56 | 35 | +21 | 69 | Qualification for the Europa League league phase |
| 6 | Fiorentina | 38 | 19 | 8 | 11 | 60 | 41 | +19 | 65 (Note: Fiorentina finished ahead of Lazio on head-to-head points: Fiorentina 2–1 Lazio, Lazio 1–2 Fiorentina.) | Qualification for the Conference League play-off round |
| 7 | Lazio | 38 | 18 | 11 | 9 | 61 | 49 | +12 | 65 | |
| 8 | Milan | 38 | 18 | 9 | 11 | 61 | 43 | +18 | 63 | |

Source: Serie A
Rules for classification: 1) Points; 2) Tiebreaker for Champions team and third relegated team; 3) Head-to-head points; 4) Head-to-head goal difference; 5) Goal difference; 6) Goals scored; 7) Draw.
(Note: Head-to-head record is used only after all the matches between the teams in question have been played)

==== Results summary ====
| Overall | | | | | | | | Home | | | | | | Away | | | | | |
| Pld | W | D | L | GF | GA | GD | Pts | W | D | L | GF | GA | GD | W | D | L | GF | GA | GD |
|---|---|---|---|---|---|---|---|---|---|---|---|---|---|---|---|---|---|---|---|
| 38 | 19 | 8 | 11 | 60 | 41 | +19 | 65 | 12 | 4 | 3 | 32 | 18 | +14 | 7 | 4 | 8 | 28 | 23 | +5 |

Source: Serie A

==== Results by round ====
| Round | 1 | 2 | 3 | 4 | 5 | 6 | 7 | 8 | 9 | 10 | 11 | 12 | 13 | 14 | 15 | 16 | 17 | 18 | 19 | 20 | 21 | 22 | 23 | 24 | 25 | 26 | 27 | 28 | 29 | 30 | 31 | 32 | 33 | 34 | 35 | 36 | 37 | 38 |
|---|---|---|---|---|---|---|---|---|---|---|---|---|---|---|---|---|---|---|---|---|---|---|---|---|---|---|---|---|---|---|---|---|---|---|---|---|---|---|
| Ground | A | H | H | A | H | A | H | A | H | A | A | H | A | H | H | A | H | A | H | A | H | A | H | A | H | A | H | A | H | H | A | H | A | H | A | A | H | A |
| Result | D | D | D | L | W | D | W | W | W | W | W | W | W | W | W | L | L | D | L | L | D | W | W | L | L | L | W | L | W | W | D | D | W | W | L | L | W | W |
| Position | 10 | 13 | 11 | 14 | 11 | 11 | 11 | 5 | 4 | 4 | 4 | 3 | 4 | 4 | 4 | 4 | 5 | 5 | 6 | 6 | 6 | 6 | 6 | 6 | 6 | 6 | 7 | 8 | 8 | 8 | 8 | 8 | 8 | 8 | 8 | 9 | 7 | 6 |

Source: Serie A
A = Away; H = Home; W = Win; D = Draw; L = Loss; P = Postponed

==== Matches ====
The match schedule was released on 4 July 2024.

| 17 August 2024 1 | Parma | 1–1 | Fiorentina | Parma |
| 18:30 CEST (UTC+2) | Man 22'; Estévez (yellow card) 36'; Balogh (yellow card) 49'; Circati (yellow card) 85' | Report | Pongračić (yellow card) 35' (yellow-red card) 83'; Biraghi 75' | Stadium: Stadio Ennio Tardini; Attendance: 21,384; Referee: Giovanni Ayroldi |

| 25 August 2024 2 | Fiorentina | 0–0 | Venezia | Florence |
| 18:30 CEST (UTC+2) | Mandragora (yellow card) 86' | Report | Oristanio (yellow card) 22'; Zampano (yellow card) 62' | Stadium: Stadio Artemio Franchi; Attendance: 18,915; Referee: SIimone Sozza |

| 1 September 2024 3 | Fiorentina | 2–2 | Monza | Florence |
| 18:30 CEST (UTC+2) | Mandragora (yellow card) 23'; Kean 45'; Dodô (yellow card) 90+5'; Gosens 90+6' | Report | Đurić 18'; Pessina (yellow card) 20'; Maldini 32'; Izzo (yellow card) 75'; Petagna (yellow card) 80'; Gagliardini (yellow card) 90+7' | Stadium: Stadio Artemio Franchi; Attendance: 18,376; Referee: Andrea Colombo |

| 15 September 2024 4 | Atalanta | 3–2 | Fiorentina | Bergamo |
| 15:00 CEST (UTC+2) | Retegui 21'; Hien (yellow card) 27'; De Ketelaere 45'; Lookman 45+1'; Zappacosta (yellow card) 82' | Report | Martínez Quarta 15'; Bove (yellow card) 17'; Kean 32'; Mandragora (yellow card) 44'; Richardson (yellow card) 67' | Stadium: Gewiss Stadium; Attendance: 22,705; Referee: Juan Luca Sacchi |

| 22 September 2024 5 | Fiorentina | 2–1 | Lazio | Florence |
| 12:30 CEST (UTC+2) | Gosens (yellow card) 11'; Biraghi (yellow card) 42'; Guðmundsson 49' (pen.), 90' (pen.); Dodô (yellow card) 90+5' | Report | Isaksen (yellow card) 26'; Gila 41'; Patric (yellow card) 85'; Tavares (yellow card) 89'; Guendouzi (yellow card) 89' | Stadium: Stadio Artemio Franchi; Attendance: 19,624; Referee: Matteo Marcenaro |

| 29 September 2024 6 | Empoli | 0–0 | Fiorentina | Empoli |
| 18:00 CEST (UTC+2) | | Report | Comuzzo (yellow card) 90' | Stadium: Stadio Carlo Castellani; Attendance: 13,053; Referee: Gianluca Aureliano |

| 6 October 2024 7 | Fiorentina | 2–1 | Milan | Florence |
| 20:45 CEST (UTC+2) | Dodô (yellow card) 8'; Kean (penalty missed) 22'; Adli 35'; Guðmundsson 73'; Bove (yellow card) 90+5' | Report | Tomori (yellow card) 24'; Morata (yellow card) 43'; Hernandez (penalty missed) 45+1', (red card) 90+6'; Abraham (penalty missed) 56'; Pulisic 60'; Reijnders (yellow card) 72' | Stadium: Stadio Artemio Franchi; Attendance: 21,923; Referee: Luca Pairetto |

| 20 October 2024 8 | Lecce | 0–6 | Fiorentina | Lecce |
| 15:00 CEST (UTC+2) | Gallo (red card) 43' | Report | Colpani (yellow card) 18', (goal) 34', 54'; Cataldi 20', 45'; Adli (yellow card) 42'; Gosens (yellow card) 59'; Beltrán 61'; Parisi 72'; Ranieri (yellow card) 80'; Richardson (yellow card) 85' | Stadium: Stadio Via del mare Attendance: 25,124; Referee: Francesco Fourneau |

| 27 October 2024 9 | Fiorentina | 5–1 | Roma | Florence |
| 20:45 CET (UTC+1) | Kean 9', 41', (yellow card) 74'; Beltrán 17' (pen.); Bove 52'; Ranieri (yellow card) 61'; Hummels 71' (o.g.) | Report | Koné 39', (yellow card) 57'; Mancini (yellow card) 42'; Pisilli (yellow card) 50'; Hermoso (yellow card) 60' (yellow-red card) 65' | Stadium: Stadio Artemio Franchi; Attendance: 20,440; Referee: Simone Sozza |

| 31 October 2024 10 | Genoa | 0–1 | Fiorentina | Genoa |
| 18:30 CET (UTC+1) | Pinamonti (yellow card) 2'; Vogliacco (yellow card) 77'; Vásquez (yellow card) 90+2'; Matturro (yellow card) 90+3' | Report | Richardson (yellow card) 6'; Martínez Quarta (yellow card) 11'; Gosens 72' | Stadium: Stadio Luigi Ferraris; Attendance: 30,254; Referee: Daniele Chiffi |

| 3 November 2024 11 | Torino | 0–1 | Fiorentina | Turin |
| 15:00 CET (UTC+1) | Ilić (yellow card) 67'; Ricci (yellow card) 74' | Report | Kean 41'; Bove (yellow card) 90+2' | Stadium: Stadio Olimpico Grande Torino; Attendance: 23,326; Referee: Federico La Penna |

| 10 November 2024 12 | Fiorentina | 3–1 | Hellas Verona | Florence |
| 15:00 CET (UTC+1) | Kean 4', 59', 90+2', (yellow card) 90+3' | Report | Serdar 18', (yellow card) 54'; Coppola (yellow card) 35' | Stadium: Stadio Artemio Franchi; Attendance: 22,495; Referee: Luca Zufferli |

| 24 November 2024 13 | Como | 0–2 | Fiorentina | Como |
| 15:00 CET (UTC+1) | Paz (yellow card) 29'; Dossena (yellow card) 88', (red card) 90+2' | Report | Adli 19'; Beltrán (yellow card) 58'; Kean 68' | Stadium: Stadio Giuseppe Sinigaglia; Attendance: 8,500; Referee: Matteo Marchetti |

| 8 December 2024 15 | Fiorentina | 1–0 | Cagliari | Florence |
| 12:30 CET (UTC+1) | Cataldi 24'; Comuzzo (yellow card) 30'; Dodô (yellow card) 58'; Gosens (yellow card) 75' | Report | Mina (yellow card) 35'; Luvumbo (yellow card) 88' | Stadium: Stadio Artemio Franchi; Attendance: 19,851; Referee: Marco Piccinini |

| 15 December 2024 16 | Bologna | 1–0 | Fiorentina | Bologna |
| 15:00 CET (UTC+1) | Pobega (yellow card) 13'; Odgaard 59'; Lykogiannis (yellow card) 82' | Report | Dodô (yellow card) 16'; Comuzzo (yellow card) 89' | Stadium: Stadio Renato Dall'Ara; Attendance: 27,970; Referee: Michael Fabbri |

| 23 December 2024 17 | Fiorentina | 1–2 | Udinese | Florence |
| 18:30 CET (UTC+1) | Sottil (yellow card) 5'; Kean 8' (pen.); Kouamé (yellow card) 81' | Report | Zemura (yellow card) 38'; Kristensen (yellow card) 46'; Lucca 49'; Ehizibue (yellow card) 52'; Thauvin 57'; Sava (yellow card) 73'; Lovrić (yellow card) 90+5' | Stadium: Stadio Artemio Franchi; Attendance: 20,505; Referee: Matteo Marcenaro |

| 29 December 2024 18 | Juventus | 2–2 | Fiorentina | Turin |
| 18:00 CET (UTC+1) | Thuram 20', 48'; McKennie (yellow card) 59'; Kalulu (yellow card) 69'; Locatelli (yellow card) 77' | Report | Kean 38'; Comuzzo (yellow card) 85'; Sottil 87' | Stadium: Juventus Stadium; Attendance: 41,188; Referee: Maurizio Mariani |

| 4 January 2025 19 | Fiorentina | 0–3 | Napoli | Florence |
| 18:00 CET (UTC+1) | | Report | Neres 29'; Di Lorenzo (yellow card) 39'; Lukaku 54' (pen.); McTominay 68' | Stadium: Stadio Artemio Franchi; Attendance: 21,685; Referee: Gianluca Manganiello |

| 13 January 2025 20 | Monza | 2–1 | Fiorentina | Monza |
| 20:45 CET (UTC+1) | Ciurria 44', (yellow card) 87'; Turati (yellow card) 61'; Maldini 63'; Pereira (yellow card) 76'; Bondo (yellow card) 87' | Report | Beltrán 74' (pen.); Ranieri (yellow card) 87' | Stadium: Stadio Brianteo; Attendance: 9,153; Referee: Federico Dionisi |

| 19 January 2025 21 | Fiorentina | 1–1 | Torino | Florence |
| 12:30 CET (UTC+1) | Kean 38', (yellow card) 45'; Gosens (yellow card) 90+1'; Folorunsho (yellow card) 90+3' | Report | Dembélé (yellow card) 27' (yellow-red card) 33'; Gineitis 70'; Njie (yellow card) 78' | Stadium: Stadio Artemio Franchi; Attendance: 19,313; Referee: Livio Marinelli |

| 26 January 2025 22 | Lazio | 1–2 | Fiorentina | Rome |
| 20:45 CET (UTC+1) | Pedro (yellow card) 90'; Marušić 90+2' | Report | Adli 11', (yellow card) 63'; Beltrán 17'; Dodô (yellow card) 70'; Mandragora (yellow card) 71' | Stadium: Stadio Olimpico; Attendance: 37,708; Referee: Antonio Rapuano |

| 2 February 2025 23 | Fiorentina | 2–1 | Genoa | Florence |
| 15:00 CET (UTC+1) | Kean 9'; Beltrán (yellow card) 17'; Guðmundsson 30'; Folorunsho (yellow card) 48'; Comuzzo (yellow card) 74' | Report | De Winter 55', (yellow card) 79' | Stadium: Stadio Artemio Franchi; Attendance: 19,088; Referee: Giuseppe Collu |

| 6 February 2025 14 | Fiorentina | 3–0 | Internazionale | Florence |
| 20:45 CET (UTC+1) | Ranieri 59'; Kean 68', 89', (yellow card) 69' | Report | | Stadium: Stadio Artemio Franchi; Attendance: 22,351; Referee: Daniele Doveri |
Note: The match was originally played on 1 December 2024 at 18:00, but was suspended in the 17th minute after Fiorentina player Edoardo Bove collapsed on the pitch. The remainder of the match was postponed to be completed on 6 February 2025.

| 10 February 2025 24 | Internazionale | 2–1 | Fiorentina | Milan |
| 20:45 CET (UTC+1) | Pongračić 28' (o.g.); Mkhitaryan (yellow card) 36'; Çalhanoğlu (yellow card) 45+2'; Arnautović 52'; Zalewski (yellow card) 70'; Barella (yellow card) 79' | Report | Richardson (yellow card) 39'; Mandragora 44' (pen.); Parisi (yellow card) 45+2'; Kean (yellow card) 66' | Stadium: San Siro; Attendance: 67,484; Referee: Federico La Penna |

| 16 February 2025 25 | Fiorentina | 0–2 | Como | Florence |
| 12:30 CET (UTC+1) | Gosens (yellow card) 27'; Folorunsho (yellow card) 53'; Guðmundsson (yellow card) 64' | Report | Diao 41'; Goldaniga (yellow card) 52'; Perrone (yellow card) 57'; Paz 66' | Stadium: Stadio Artemio Franchi; Attendance: 20,000; Referee: Marco Piccinini |

| 23 February 2025 26 | Hellas Verona | 1–0 | Fiorentina | Verona |
| 15:00 CET (UTC+1) | Duda (yellow card) 40'; Oyegoke (yellow card) 88'; Bernède 90+5' | Report | Folorunsho (yellow card) 51'; Richardson (yellow card) 70'; Cataldi (yellow card) 90+7' | Stadium: Stadio Marcantonio Bentegodi; Attendance: 26,496; Referee: Marco Di Bello |

| 28 February 2025 27 | Fiorentina | 1–0 | Lecce | Florence |
| 20:45 CET (UTC+1) | Gosens 9'; Beltrán (yellow card) 17', (penalty missed) 73'; Zaniolo (yellow card) 61'; Mandragora (yellow card) 86' | Report | Berisha (yellow card) 45+2'; Gallo (yellow card) 51' | Stadium: Stadio Artemio Franchi; Attendance: 17,383; Referee: Livio Marinelli |

| 9 March 2025 28 | Napoli | 2–1 | Fiorentina | Naples |
| 15:00 CET (UTC+1) | Lukaku 26'; Buongiorno (yellow card) 47'; Raspadori 60' | Report | Guðmundsson (yellow card) 64', (goal) 66'; Pongračić (yellow card) 88' | Stadium: Stadio Diego Armando Maradona; Attendance: 51,504; Referee: Andrea Colombo |

| 16 March 2025 29 | Fiorentina | 3–0 | Juventus | Florence |
| 18:00 CET (UTC+1) | Marí (yellow card) 13'; Gosens 15'; Mandragora 18'; Guðmundsson 53'; Ranieri (yellow card) 73' | Report | Locatelli (yellow card) 46'; Weah (yellow card) 73'; Thuram (yellow card) 82' | Stadium: Stadio Artemio Franchi; Attendance: 22,253; Referee: Michael Fabbri |

| 30 March 2025 30 | Fiorentina | 1–0 | Atalanta | Florence |
| 15:00 CEST (UTC+2) | Kean 45' | Report | Hien (yellow card) 77'; Samardžić (yellow card) 86'; Kolašinac (yellow card) 90+3' | Stadium: Stadio Artemio Franchi; Attendance: 20,409; Referee: Daniele Doveri |

| 5 April 2025 31 | Milan | 2–2 | Fiorentina | Milan |
| 20:45 CEST (UTC+2) | Abraham 23'; Hernandez (yellow card) 41'; Walker (yellow card) 45+4'; Leão (yellow card) 58'; Pulisic (yellow card) 58'; Jović 64' | Report | Thiaw 7' (o.g.); Kean 10'; Marí (yellow card) 31'; Dodô (yellow card) 41'; De Gea (yellow card) 66' | Stadium: San Siro; Attendance: 72,451; Referee: Giovanni Ayroldi |

| 13 April 2025 32 | Fiorentina | 0–0 | Parma | Florence |
| 15:00 CEST (UTC+2) | | Report | Pellegrino (yellow card) 12'; Valeri (yellow card) 35'; Leoni (yellow card) 41'; Sohm (yellow card) 43'; Valenti (yellow card) 88' | Stadium: Stadio Artemio Franchi; Attendance: 21,355; Referee: Gianluca Manganiello |

| 23 April 2025 33 | Cagliari | 1–2 | Fiorentina | Cagliari |
| 18:30 CEST (UTC+2) | Piccoli 7', (yellow card) 79'; Palomino (yellow card) 65' | Report | Gosens 36'; Beltrán 48'; Parisi (yellow card) 84'; Zaniolo (yellow card) 90+6' | Stadium: Unipol Domus; Attendance: 15,917; Referee: Livio Marinelli |
Note: The match was originally scheduled for 21 April 2025, but was postponed due to the death of Pope Francis.

| 27 April 2025 34 | Fiorentina | 2–1 | Empoli | Florence |
| 15:00 CEST (UTC+2) | Adli 7'; Beltrán (yellow card) 16'; Mandragora 25', (yellow card) 78'; Ranieri (yellow card) 55' | Report | Anjorin (yellow card) 20'; Henderson (yellow card) 53'; Fazzini 57' | Stadium: Stadio Artemio Franchi; Attendance: 20,547; Referee: Antonio Rapuano |

| 4 May 2025 35 | Roma | 1–0 | Fiorentina | Rome |
| 18:00 CEST (UTC+2) | Dovbyk 45+5'; Soulé (yellow card) 89'; Pisilli (yellow card) 90+4' | Report | Ndour (yellow card) 64'; Kean (yellow card) 85'; Zaniolo (red card) 90+6' | Stadium: Stadio Olimpico; Attendance: 63,640; Referee: Daniele Chiffi |
Note: Zaniolo received a red card after being substituted from the match.

| 12 May 2025 36 | Venezia | 2–1 | Fiorentina | Venice |
| 18:30 CEST (UTC+2) | Candé 60'; Oristanio 68'; Busio (yellow card) 83' | Report | Mandragora 77'; Folorunsho (yellow card) 84'; Dodô (yellow card) 88'; Beltrán (yellow card) 90+3'; Ranieri (yellow card) 90+3' | Stadium: Stadio Pier Luigi Penzo; Attendance: 10,300; Referee: Matteo Marchetti |

| 18 May 2025 37 | Fiorentina | 3–2 | Bologna | Florence |
| 20:45 CEST (UTC+2) | Parisi 13', (yellow card) 77'; Ranieri (yellow card) 20'; Gosens (yellow card) 65'; Richardson 67'; Kean 84'; Mandragora (yellow card) 90' | Report | Dallinga 61'; Ndoye (yellow card) 77'; Orsolini 79'; Miranda (red card) 88' | Stadium: Stadio Artemio Franchi; Attendance: 21,280; Referee: Luca Zufferli |

| 25 May 2025 38 | Udinese | 2–3 | Fiorentina | Udine |
| 20:45 CEST (UTC+2) | Bijol (yellow card) 9' (yellow-red card) 39'; Lucca 26'; Kabasele 61'; Karlström (yellow card) 89' | Report | Fagioli 46'; Beltrán (yellow card) 50'; Comuzzo 57'; Richardson (yellow card) 59'; Kean 82' | Stadium: Stadio Friuli; Attendance: 20,463; Referee: Matteo Marcenaro |

=== Coppa Italia ===
| 4 December 2024 Round of 16 | Fiorentina | 2–2 (3–4 p) | Empoli | Florence |
| 21:00 CET (UTC+1) | Kean 59'; Sottil 70'; Gosens (yellow card) 73' | Report | Ekong 4'; Marianucci (yellow card) 36'; Esposito 75'; Pezzella (yellow card) 82' | Stadium: Stadio Artemio Franchi; Attendance: 17,618; Referee: Antonio Giua |
| | Penalties |
| | Guðmundsson (penalty scored); Kouamé (penalty scored); Ranieri (penalty missed); Kean (penalty missed); Cataldi (penalty scored) | | (penalty scored) Colombo; (penalty missed) Ekong; (penalty scored) Henderson; (penalty scored) Marianucci; (penalty scored) Esposito |

=== UEFA Conference League ===
==== Play-off round ====
The draw for the play-off round was held on 5 August 2024.

| 22 August 2024 First leg | Fiorentina (Italy) | 3–3 | (Hungary) Puskás Akadémia | Florence, Italy |
| 20:00 CEST (UTC+2) | Martínez Quarta (yellow card) 17', (goal) 67'; Sottil 45+3'; Kean 75'; Pongračić (yellow card) 85'; Biraghi (yellow card) 90' | Report | Nagy 9' (pen.), (yellow card) 56'; Soisalo 12'; Golla 89' | Stadium: Stadio Artemio Franchi; Attendance: 12,091; Referee: Willy Delajod (France) |

| 29 August 2024 Second leg | Puskás Akadémia (Hungary) | 1–1 (a.e.t.) (4–4 agg.) (4–5 p) | (Italy) Fiorentina | Felcsút, Hungary |
| 21:00 CEST (UTC+2) | Plšek (yellow card) 52'; Colley (yellow card) 79'; Komáromi (yellow card) 81'; Favorov (yellow card) 90+2'; Maceiras (yellow card) 90+3'; Nagy 90+7' (pen.) | Report | Pongračić (yellow card) 8'; Kean (yellow card) 44', (goal) 59'; Comuzzo (yellow card) 76' (yellow-red card) 97'; Ranieri (yellow card) 79' (yellow-red card) 90+4'; Martínez Quarta (red card) 98'; Ikoné (yellow card) 120+' | Stadium: Pancho Aréna; Attendance: 3,528; Referee: António Nobre (Portugal) |
| | Penalties |
| | Komáromi (penalty scored); Favorov (penalty scored); Golla (penalty scored); Szolnoki (penalty missed); Nagy (penalty scored) | | (penalty scored) Mandragora; (penalty scored) Kouamé; (penalty scored) Colpani; (penalty scored) Richardson; (penalty scored) Biraghi |
Note: Martínez Quarta received a red card after being substituted from the match.

==== League phase ====
The draw for the league phase was held on 30 August 2024.

| Pos | Team | Pld | W | D | L | GF | GA | GD | Pts | Qualification |
|---|---|---|---|---|---|---|---|---|---|---|
| 1 | (The Football Association) Chelsea | 6 | 6 | 0 | 0 | 26 | 5 | +21 | 18 | Advance to round of 16 (seeded) |
| 2 | (Portuguese Football Federation) Vitória de Guimarães | 6 | 4 | 2 | 0 | 13 | 6 | +7 | 14 | Advance to round of 16 (seeded) |
| 3 | (Italian Football Federation) Fiorentina | 6 | 4 | 1 | 1 | 18 | 7 | +11 | 13 | Advance to round of 16 (seeded) |
| 4 | (Austrian Football Association) Rapid Wien | 6 | 4 | 1 | 1 | 11 | 5 | +6 | 13 | Advance to round of 16 (seeded) |
| 5 | (Swedish Football Association) Djurgårdens IF | 6 | 4 | 1 | 1 | 11 | 7 | +4 | 13 (Note: Away goals scored: Djurgårdens IF 5, Lugano 4.) | Advance to round of 16 (seeded) |

Source: UEFA
Rules for classification: League phase tiebreakers
Notes:

| Round | 1 | 2 | 3 | 4 | 5 | 6 |
|---|---|---|---|---|---|---|
| Ground | H | A | A | H | H | A |
| Result | W | W | L | W | W | D |
| Position | 8 | 2 | 8 | 6 | 3 | 3 |

Source: UEFA
A = Away; H = Home; W = Win; D = Draw; L = Loss

| 3 October 2024 1 | Fiorentina (Italy) | 2–0 | (Wales) The New Saints | Florence, Italy |
| 21:00 CEST (UTC+2) | Adli 65'; Kean 68'; Kouamé (yellow card) 87' | Report | Williams (yellow card) 56' | Stadium: Stadio Artemio Franchi; Attendance: 10,751; Referee: Sebastian Gishamer (Austria) |

| 24 October 2024 2 | St. Gallen (Switzerland) | 2–4 | (Italy) Fiorentina | St. Gallen, Switzerland |
| 18:45 CEST (UTC+2) | Mambimbi 23', (yellow card) 45+6'; Stanić (yellow card) 45+3'; Görtler 62'; Witzig (yellow card) 86' | Report | Kouamé (yellow card) 45+6'; Martínez Quarta 50'; Ikoné 54', 69'; Sottil (yellow card) 61'; Cataldi (yellow card) 71'; Gosens 90+3' | Stadium: Kybunpark; Attendance: 16,747; Referee: Yigal Frid (Israel) |

| 7 November 2024 3 | APOEL (Cyprus) | 2–1 | (Italy) Fiorentina | Nicosia, Cyprus |
| 22:00 EET (UTC+2) | Tejera (yellow card) 21'; Donis 37', (yellow card) 79'; Abagna 45+1'; Chebake (yellow card) 89'; Laifis (yellow card) 90+6' | Report | Moreno (yellow card) 49'; Martínez Quarta (yellow card) 72'; Ikoné 74'; Dodô (yellow card) 90+8' | Stadium: GSP Stadium; Attendance: 9,300; Referee: François Letexier (France) |

| 28 November 2024 4 | Fiorentina (Italy) | 3–2 | (Cyprus) Pafos | Florence, Italy |
| 21:00 CET (UTC+1) | Kouamé 38'; Goldar 53' (o.g.); Parisi (yellow card) 60'; Martínez Quarta 72'; Pongračić (yellow card) 73'; Rubino (yellow card) 90+5' | Report | Šunjić (yellow card) 43'; Pêpê (yellow card) 60'; Jairo 68'; Correia (yellow card) 73'; Bruno Felipe (yellow card) 83'; Jajá 87' | Stadium: Stadio Artemio Franchi; Attendance: 11,145; Referee: Espen Eskås (Norway) |

| 12 December 2024 5 | Fiorentina (Italy) | 7–0 | (Austria) LASK | Florence, Italy |
| 18:45 CET (UTC+1) | Sottil 10', 58'; Ikoné 22'; Richardson 39'; Mandragora 69'; Stojković 82' (o.g.); Guðmundsson 85' (pen.); Martínez Quarta (yellow card) 90+1' | Report | Jovičić (yellow card) 45+1' | Stadium: Stadio Artemio Franchi; Attendance: 9,211; Referee: Balázs Berke (Hungary) |

| 19 December 2024 6 | Vitória de Guimarães (Portugal) | 1–1 | (Italy) Fiorentina | Guimarães, Portugal |
| 20:00 WET (UTC±0) | G. Silva 33', (yellow card) 42'; T. Silva (yellow card) 45+1'; M. Silva (yellow card) 50'; Varela (yellow card) 90+5' | Report | Kouamé (yellow card) 66'; Mandragora 87' | Stadium: Estádio D. Afonso Henriques; Attendance: 16,466; Referee: Juxhin Xhaja (Albania) |

==== Knockout phase ====
===== Round of 16 =====
The draw for the round of 16 was held on 21 February 2025.

| 6 March 2025 First leg | Panathinaikos (Greece) | 3–2 | (Italy) Fiorentina | Athens, Greece |
| 19:45 EET (UTC+2) | Świderski 5'; Maksimović 19'; Tetê (yellow card) 39', (goal) 55' | Report | Beltrán 20'; Fagioli 23'; Dodô (yellow card) 78'; Moreno (yellow card) 90+4' | Stadium: Olympic Stadium; Attendance: 26,849; Referee: Erik Lambrechts (Belgium) |

| 13 March 2025 Second leg | Fiorentina (Italy) | 3–1 (5–4 agg.) | (Greece) Panathinaikos | Florence, Italy |
| 21:00 CET (UTC+1) | Mandragora 12'; Guðmundsson 24'; Comuzzo (yellow card) 70'; Pongračić (yellow card) 74'; Kean 75', (yellow card) 78'; Zaniolo (yellow card) 90+2' | Report | Mladenović (yellow card) 28' (yellow-red card) 90+3'; Świderski (yellow card) 74'; Ioannidis 81' (pen.); Vagiannidis (yellow card) 83'; Siopis (yellow card) 90+3' | Stadium: Stadio Artemio Franchi; Attendance: 15,101; Referee: John Beaton (Scotland) |

===== Quarter-finals =====
The draw for the order of the quarter-final legs was held on 21 February 2025, after the draw for the round of 16.

| 10 April 2025 First leg | Celje (Slovenia) | 1–2 | (Italy) Fiorentina | Celje, Slovenia |
| 21:00 CEST (UTC+2) | Vuklišević (yellow card) 55'; Delaurier-Chaubet 68' (pen.) | Report | Ranieri 27', (yellow card) 49'; Moreno (yellow card) 35'; Zaniolo (yellow card) 53'; Mandragora 62' (pen.); Dodô (yellow card) 87'; Parisi (yellow card) 90+6' | Stadium: Stadion Z'dežele; Attendance: 12,512; Referee: Felix Zwayer (Germany) |

| 17 April 2025 Second leg | Fiorentina (Italy) | 2–2 (4–3 agg.) | (Slovenia) Celje | Florence, Italy |
| 18:45 CEST (UTC+2) | Mandragora 37', (yellow card) 61'; Folorunsho (yellow card) 55'; Kean 67' | Report | Matko 54'; Nemanič 65'; Vuklišević (yellow card) 90+5' | Stadium: Stadio Artemio Franchi; Attendance: 13,195; Referee: João Pinheiro (Portugal) |

===== Semi-finals =====
The draw for the order of the semi-final legs was held on 21 February 2025, after the draw for the round of 16 and quarter-finals.

| 1 May 2025 First leg | Real Betis (Spain) | 2–1 | (Italy) Fiorentina | Seville, Spain |
| 21:00 CEST (UTC+2) | Bakambu (yellow card) 6'; Ezzalzouli 6'; Antony 64'; Perraud (yellow card) 73' | Report | Parisi (yellow card) 64'; Ranieri 73'; Folorunsho (yellow card) 73'; Adli (yellow card) 84'; Mandragora (yellow card) 90+5' | Stadium: Benito Villamarín; Attendance: 56,417; Referee: Michael Oliver (England) |

| 8 May 2025 Second leg | Fiorentina (Italy) | 2–2 (a.e.t.) (3–4 agg.) | (Spain) Real Betis | Florence, Italy |
| 21:00 CEST (UTC+2) | Gosens 34', 42'; Dodô (yellow card) 43'; Richardson (yellow card) 77'; Pongračić (yellow card) 77'; Kean (yellow card) 84'; Fagioli (yellow card) 87'; Ranieri (yellow card) 99'; Folorunsho (yellow card) 110' | Report | Antony 30'; Fornals (yellow card) 43'; Natan (yellow card) 84'; Ezzalzouli 97'; Ruibal (yellow card) 99'; Vieites (yellow card) 120+3' | Stadium: Stadio Artemio Franchi; Attendance: 21,252; Referee: Glenn Nyberg (Sweden) |

== Squad statistics ==
| No. | Pos | Nat | Player | Total | | Serie A | | Coppa Italia | | UEFA Conference League | |
| No. | Pos | Nat | Player | Apps | Goals | Apps | Goals | Apps | Goals | Apps | Goals |
Goalkeepers
| 1 | GK | (Italy) ITA | Pietro Terracciano | 10 | 0 | 3 | 0 | 1 | 0 | 6 | 0 |
| 30 | GK | (Italy) ITA | Tommaso Martinelli | 1 | 0 | 0 | 0 | 0 | 0 | 1 | 0 |
| 43 | GK | (Spain) ESP | David de Gea | 42 | 0 | 35 | 0 | 0 | 0 | 7 | 0 |
Defenders
| 2 | DF | (Brazil) BRA | Dodô | 46 | 0 | 35 | 0 | 1 | 0 | 6+4 | 0 |
| 5 | DF | (Croatia) CRO | Marin Pongračić | 28 | 0 | 14+6 | 0 | 0 | 0 | 8 | 0 |
| 6 | DF | (Italy) ITA | Luca Ranieri | 48 | 3 | 35+1 | 1 | 1 | 0 | 9+2 | 2 |
| 15 | DF | (Italy) ITA | Pietro Comuzzo | 44 | 1 | 24+9 | 1 | 1 | 0 | 8+2 | 0 |
| 18 | DF | (Spain) ESP | Pablo Marí | 13 | 0 | 12+1 | 0 | 0 | 0 | 0 | 0 |
| 21 | DF | (Germany) GER | Robin Gosens | 41 | 8 | 29+3 | 5 | 1 | 0 | 4+4 | 3 |
| 22 | DF | (Argentina) ARG | Matías Moreno | 12 | 0 | 2+2 | 0 | 0 | 0 | 5+3 | 0 |
| 65 | DF | (Italy) ITA | Fabiano Parisi | 40 | 2 | 11+15 | 2 | 0+1 | 0 | 8+5 | 0 |
Midfielders
| 4 | MF | (Italy) ITA | Edoardo Bove | 15 | 1 | 11+1 | 1 | 0 | 0 | 1+2 | 0 |
| 8 | MF | (Italy) ITA | Rolando Mandragora | 39 | 9 | 21+6 | 4 | 0 | 0 | 11+1 | 5 |
| 23 | MF | (Italy) ITA | Andrea Colpani | 31 | 2 | 18+7 | 2 | 1 | 0 | 1+4 | 0 |
| 24 | MF | (Morocco) MAR | Amir Richardson | 39 | 2 | 10+17 | 1 | 0+1 | 0 | 6+5 | 1 |
| 27 | MF | (Italy) ITA | Cher Ndour | 9 | 0 | 4+5 | 0 | 0 | 0 | 0 | 0 |
| 29 | MF | (France) FRA | Yacine Adli | 35 | 5 | 15+11 | 4 | 0 | 0 | 5+4 | 1 |
| 32 | MF | (Italy) ITA | Danilo Cataldi | 33 | 3 | 23+2 | 3 | 1 | 0 | 4+3 | 0 |
| 44 | MF | (Italy) ITA | Nicolò Fagioli | 21 | 2 | 10+5 | 1 | 0 | 0 | 5+1 | 1 |
| 64 | MF | (Italy) ITA | Jonas Harder | 1 | 0 | 0 | 0 | 0 | 0 | 0+1 | 0 |
| 90 | MF | (Italy) ITA | Michael Folorunsho | 19 | 0 | 6+8 | 0 | 0 | 0 | 2+3 | 0 |
Forwards
| 9 | FW | (Argentina) ARG | Lucas Beltrán | 47 | 5 | 21+12 | 4 | 1 | 0 | 7+6 | 1 |
| 10 | FW | (Iceland) ISL | Albert Guðmundsson | 33 | 8 | 16+8 | 6 | 0+1 | 0 | 5+3 | 2 |
| 17 | FW | (Italy) ITA | Nicolò Zaniolo | 13 | 1 | 4+5 | 0 | 0 | 0 | 1+3 | 1 |
| 20 | FW | (Italy) ITA | Moise Kean | 44 | 25 | 31+1 | 19 | 1 | 1 | 6+5 | 5 |
| 63 | FW | (Italy) ITA | Maat Daniel Caprini | 2 | 0 | 0+2 | 0 | 0 | 0 | 0 | 0 |
| 66 | FW | (Italy) ITA | Tommaso Rubino | 2 | 0 | 0+1 | 0 | 0 | 0 | 0+1 | 0 |
Players transferred/loaned out during the season
| 3 | DF | (Italy) ITA | Cristiano Biraghi | 12 | 1 | 5+3 | 1 | 0 | 0 | 3+1 | 0 |
| 4 | MF | (Morocco) MAR | Sofyan Amrabat | 4 | 0 | 2 | 0 | 0 | 0 | 1+1 | 0 |
| 7 | FW | (Italy) ITA | Riccardo Sottil | 25 | 5 | 8+10 | 1 | 1 | 1 | 6 | 3 |
| 8 | MF | (Italy) ITA | Alessandro Bianco | 3 | 0 | 1+1 | 0 | 0 | 0 | 1 | 0 |
| 11 | FW | (France) FRA | Jonathan Ikoné | 23 | 4 | 1+13 | 0 | 0+1 | 0 | 7+1 | 4 |
| 14 | DF | (Argentina) ARG | Nicolás Valentini | 0 | 0 | 0 | 0 | 0 | 0 | 0 | 0 |
| 28 | DF | (Argentina) ARG | Lucas Martínez Quarta | 16 | 4 | 4+4 | 1 | 1 | 0 | 7 | 3 |
| 33 | DF | (Italy) ITA | Michael Kayode | 12 | 0 | 1+4 | 0 | 0 | 0 | 5+2 | 0 |
| 53 | GK | (Denmark) DEN | Oliver Christensen | 0 | 0 | 0 | 0 | 0 | 0 | 0 | 0 |
| 77 | FW | (Croatia) CRO | Josip Brekalo | 0 | 0 | 0 | 0 | 0 | 0 | 0 | 0 |
| 72 | MF | (Czech Republic) CZE | Antonín Barák | 1 | 0 | 1 | 0 | 0 | 0 | 0 | 0 |
| 99 | FW | (Ivory Coast) CIV | Christian Kouamé | 27 | 1 | 5+13 | 0 | 0+1 | 0 | 6+2 | 1 |

Source: Competitions
