= 2025–26 ACF Fiorentina season =

Fiorentina
2025–26 season
- Owner: Mediacom
- President: Rocco B. Commisso (until 16 January); Giuseppe B. Commisso (from 27 January)
- Head coach: Stefano Pioli (until 4 November); Daniele Galloppa (interim, from 4 to 7 November); Paolo Vanoli (from 7 November)
- Stadium: Stadio Artemio Franchi
- Serie A: 15th
- Coppa Italia: Round of 16
- UEFA Conference League: Quarter-finals
- Top goalscorer: League: Moise Kean (8); All: Albert Guðmundsson (10)
- Highest home attendance: 22,346
- Lowest home attendance: 5,033
- Average home league attendance: 20,400
- Biggest win: 5–1 vs Udinese (H); 21 December 2025, Serie A
- Biggest defeat: 0–4 vs Roma (A); 4 May 2026, Serie A
Home colours	Away colours	Third colours

The 2025–26 season was the 99th season in the history of ACF Fiorentina, and the club's 22nd consecutive season in the Italian top flight. In addition to the domestic league, the club participated in the Coppa Italia and the UEFA Conference League.

On 30 May 2025, head coach Raffaele Palladino resigned, despite the club extending his contract to 2027 just several weeks prior. Fiorentina thus hired former manager Stefano Pioli, who had previously been the head coach at Saudi Arabian side Al-Nassr.

== Season summary ==
This was a disappointing season for 'La Viola', as they recorded their lowest league finish since 2018–19. They endured a difficult beginning to the campaign, recording no wins and four draws in their opening ten matches. This concluded in the firing of Pioli on 4 November 2025, following a defeat to Lecce. Primavera head coach Daniele Galloppa took over briefly as interim, overseeing a 2–1 defeat to Mainz 05 in the UEFA Conference League. Paolo Vanoli took over for the rest of the season, seeing a relative upturn in form, steering the club away from serious relegation fears and to safety in 15th place. This resulted Fiorentina's fourth-worst points tally in Serie A for the club since the introduction of three points for a win in 1995–96.

In more detail, Fiorentina had to wait until the 16th matchday for their first league win of the season, with a crushing 5–1 victory over Udinese. Fiorentina nevertheless went into the Christmas break at the foot of the table, and would not escape the drop zone until 18 January, and later definitively from 23 February.

Amidst the poor performances on the pitch, Fiorentina endured more drama away from it as the president Rocco Commisso passed away on 16 January, with his son Giuseppe taking over shortly after. This was yet another tragic passing in the Fiorentina family's recent history, following general manager Joe Barone in 2024, and former captain Davide Astori in 2018.

Additionally, the Stadio Artemio Franchi continued its renovation works throughout this season, with the main stand Curva Fiesole remaining closed throughout, limiting attendance figures, as the club aimed to have its stadium selected for hosting at UEFA Euro 2032.

== Squad information ==
Players and squad numbers last updated on 22 May 2026. Appearances include all competitions. Note: Flags indicate national team as has been defined under FIFA eligibility rules. Players may hold more than one non-FIFA nationality.

No.	Player	Nat.	Position(s)	Date of birth (age)	Signed in	Contract ends	Signed from	Transfer fee	Apps.	Goals
Goalkeepers
1	Luca Lezzerini	(Italy)	GK	24 March 1995 (aged 31)	2025	2026	(Italy) Brescia	Free	3	0
43	David de Gea	(Spain)	GK	7 November 1990 (aged 35)	2024	2028	Unattached	Free	88	0
53	Oliver Christensen	(Denmark)	GK	22 March 1999 (aged 27)	2023	2028	(Germany) Hertha BSC	€6M	14	0
Defenders
2	Dodô	(Brazil)	RB	17 November 1998 (aged 27)	2022	2027	(Ukraine) Shakhtar Donetsk	€14.5M	161	3
3	Daniele Rugani	(Italy)	CB	29 July 1994 (aged 31)	2026	2026	(Italy) Juventus	Loan	6	0
5	Marin Pongračić	(Croatia)	CB	11 September 1997 (aged 28)	2024	2029	(Italy) Lecce	€15M	76	1
6	Luca Ranieri	(Italy)	CB / LB	23 April 1999 (aged 27)	2018	2028	(Italy) Youth Sector	N/A	160	11
15	Pietro Comuzzo	(Italy)	CB	10 February 2005 (aged 21)	2023	2029	(Italy) Youth Sector	N/A	91	2
21	Robin Gosens	(Germany)	LB / LM	5 July 1994 (aged 31)	2024	2028	(Germany) Union Berlin	€7M	77	12
23	Eman Košpo	(Bosnia and Herzegovina)	CB	17 May 2007 (aged 19)	2025	2030	(Spain) Barcelona	€0.4M	0	0
24	Daniele Rugani	(Italy)	CB	29 July 1994 (aged 31)	2026	2026	(Italy) Juventus	Loan	0	0
26	Mattia Viti	(Italy)	CB / LB	24 January 2002 (aged 24)	2025	2026	(France) Nice	Loan	16	0
29	Niccolò Fortini	(Italy)	LB	13 February 2006 (aged 20)		2027	(Italy) Youth Sector	N/A	26	0
48	Tariq Lamptey	(Ghana)	RB	30 September 2000 (aged 25)	2025	2028	(England) Brighton & Hove Albion	€6M	2	0
60	Eddy Kouadio	(Italy)	RWB / RB	7 May 2006 (aged 20)	2024	2027	(Italy) Youth Sector	N/A	8	0
62	Luis Balbo	(Venezuela)	RB	28 March 2006 (aged 20)	2024	2028	(Italy) Youth Sector	N/A	10	0
65	Fabiano Parisi	(Italy)	LB / LM	9 November 2000 (aged 25)	2023	2028	(Italy) Empoli	€10M	105	3
Midfielders
4	Marco Brescianini	(Italy)	CM	20 January 2000 (aged 26)	2026	2026	(Italy) Atalanta	Loan	18	1
8	Rolando Mandragora	(Italy)	DM / CM	29 June 1997 (aged 29)	2022	2026	(Italy) Juventus	€8.2M	189	26
11	Abdelhamid Sabiri	(Morocco)	AM	28 November 1996 (aged 29)	2023	2026	(Italy) Sampdoria	€2.5M	2	0
17	Jack Harrison	(England)	RW / AM / LW	20 November 1996 (aged 29)	2026	2026	(England) Leeds United	Loan	22	1
22	Jacopo Fazzini	(Italy)	CM	16 March 2003 (aged 23)	2025	2030	(Italy) Empoli	€10M	32	0
27	Cher Ndour	(Italy)	CM	27 July 2004 (aged 21)	2025	2029	(France) Paris Saint-Germain	€5M	56	7
44	Nicolò Fagioli	(Italy)	CM / AM	12 February 2001 (aged 25)	2025	2029	(Italy) Juventus	€13.5M	66	5
80	Giovanni Fabbian	(Italy)	AM	14 January 2003 (aged 23)	2026	2026	(Italy) Bologna	Loan	22	0
Forwards
10	Albert Guðmundsson	(Iceland)	ST / RW / AM / LW	6 December 1997 (aged 28)	2024	2029	(Italy) Genoa	€13M	79	18
19	Manor Solomon	(Israel)	RW / AM / LW	24 July 1999 (aged 26)	2025	2026	(England) Tottenham Hotspur	Loan	19	2
20	Moise Kean	(Italy)	ST	28 February 2000 (aged 26)	2024	2029	(Italy) Juventus	€13M	77	34
61	Riccardo Braschi	(Italy)	ST	24 August 2006 (aged 19)	2025		(Italy) Youth Sector	N/A	3	0
69	Giorgio Puzzoli	(Italy)	ST	24 February 2006 (aged 20)	2023	2028	(Italy) Youth Sector	N/A	1	0
91	Roberto Piccoli	(Italy)	ST	27 January 2001 (aged 25)	2025	2030	(Italy) Cagliari	€25M	43	8

== Transfers ==
=== Summer window ===
==== In ====
Date	Pos.	Player	Age	Moving from	Fee	Notes	Ref.
1 July 2025	MF	(Italy) Nicolò Fagioli	24	(Italy) Juventus	€13,500,000	Obligation to buy as part of initial loan transfer	
1 July 2025	FW	(Iceland) Albert Guðmundsson	28	(Italy) Genoa	€13,000,000	Option to buy as part of initial loan transfer	
1 July 2025	MF	(Italy) Jacopo Fazzini	22	(Italy) Empoli	€10,000,000		
1 July 2025	MF	(Germany) Robin Gosens	30	(Germany) Union Berlin	€7,000,000	Option to buy as part of initial loan transfer	
10 July 2025	FW	(Bosnia and Herzegovina) Edin Džeko	39	(Turkey) Fenerbahçe	Free		
15 July 2025	DF	(Bosnia and Herzegovina) Eman Košpo	18	(Spain) Barcelona	€400,000		
1 August 2025	GK	(Italy) Luca Lezzerini	30	(Italy) Brescia	Free		
4 August 2025	MF	(Switzerland) Simon Sohm	24	(Italy) Parma	€15,000,000		
25 August 2025	FW	(Italy) Roberto Piccoli	24	(Italy) Cagliari	€25,000,000		
1 September 2025	DF	(Ghana) Tariq Lamptey	24	(England) Brighton & Hove Albion	€6,000,000		

==== Loans in ====
Date	Pos.	Player	Age	Moving from	Fee	Notes	Ref.
1 July 2025	DF	(Italy) Mattia Viti	23	(France) Nice	Loan	Option to buy	
30 August 2025	MF	(Italy) Hans Nicolussi Caviglia	25	(Italy) Venezia	€1,000,000	Obligation to buy under certain conditions	

==== Out ====
Date	Pos.	Player	Age	Moving to	Fee	Notes	Ref.
1 July 2025	FW	(Argentina) Nicolás González	27	(Italy) Juventus	€28,100,000	Obligation to buy as part of initial loan transfer	
1 July 2025	DF	(Italy) Michael Kayode	20	(England) Brentford	€17,500,000	Option to buy as part of initial loan transfer	
1 July 2025	MF	(Morocco) Sofyan Amrabat	28	(Turkey) Fenerbahçe	€12,000,000	Obligation to buy as part of initial loan transfer	
1 July 2025	DF	(Italy) Cristiano Biraghi	32	(Italy) Torino	€100,000	Option to buy as part of initial loan transfer	
3 July 2025	DF	(Italy) Edoardo Pierozzi	23	(Italy) Benevento	Free		
18 July 2025	GK	(Italy) Pietro Terracciano	35	(Italy) Milan	Free		
23 July 2025	MF	(Italy) Niccolò Nardi	21	(Italy) Siena	Undisclosed		
25 July 2025	DF	(Italy) Davide Gentile	21	(Italy) Livorno	Free		
31 July 2025	DF	(Italy) Costantino Favasuli	21	(Italy) Catanzaro	Undisclosed		
12 August 2025	DF	(Romania) Eduard Duțu	24	(Italy) Latina	Free		
21 August 2025	FW	(Croatia) Josip Brekalo	27	(Spain) Oviedo	Free	Contract terminated	
1 September 2025	FW	(France) Jonathan Ikoné	27	(France) Paris FC	€2,000,000		

==== Loans out ====
Date	Pos.	Player	Age	Moving to	Fee	Notes	Ref.
11 July 2025	DF	(Argentina) Matías Moreno	21	(Spain) Levante	€500,000	Option to buy	
14 July 2025	FW	(Italy) Filippo Distefano	21	(Italy) Carrarese			
18 July 2025	DF	(Italy) Lorenzo Lucchesi	22	(Italy) Monza	€250,000	Option to buy	
20 July 2025	MF	(Italy) Lorenzo Amatucci	21	(Spain) Las Palmas		Option to buy	
23 July 2025	FW	(Italy) Maat Daniel Caprini	19	(Italy) Mantova			
2 August 2025	GK	(Denmark) Oliver Christensen	26	(Austria) Sturm Graz			
7 August 2025	FW	(Angola) M'Bala Nzola	28	(Italy) Pisa	€1,000,000	Option to buy	
10 August 2025	FW	(Italy) Riccardo Sottil	26	(Italy) Lecce	€500,000		
1 September 2025	MF	(Italy) Alessandro Bianco	22	(Greece) PAOK		Option to buy	
1 September 2025	MF	(Czech Republic) Antonín Barák	30	(Italy) Sampdoria			
1 September 2025	FW	(Argentina) Lucas Beltrán	24	(Spain) Valencia	€1,000,000		

=== Winter window ===
==== In ====
Date	Pos.	Player	Age	Moving from	Fee	Notes	Ref.
30 January 2026	FW	(Angola) M'Bala Nzola	29	(Italy) Pisa	Loan return	Loan terminated	

==== Loans in ====
Date	Pos.	Player	Age	Moving from	Fee	Notes	Ref.
2 January 2026	FW	(Israel) Manor Solomon	26	(England) Tottenham Hotspur	Loan	Until end of season	
9 January 2026	MF	(Italy) Marco Brescianini	25	(Italy) Atalanta	€1,000,000	Obligation to buy under certain conditions	
19 January 2026	MF	(England) Jack Harrison	29	(England) Leeds United	€1,000,000	Option to buy	
21 January 2026	MF	(Italy) Giovanni Fabbian	23	(Italy) Bologna	Loan	Until end of season	
2 February 2026	DF	(Italy) Daniele Rugani	31	(Italy) Juventus	€500,000	Obligation to buy under certain conditions	

==== Out ====
Date	Pos.	Player	Age	Moving to	Fee	Notes	Ref.
11 January 2026	DF	(Spain) Pablo Marí	32	(Saudi Arabia) Al-Hilal	€2,000,000		
22 January 2026	FW	(Bosnia and Herzegovina) Edin Džeko	39	(Germany) Schalke 04	Free		
29 January 2026	MF	(Italy) Hans Nicolussi Caviglia	25	(Italy) Venezia	Free	Loan terminated	
6 February 2026	FW	(Ivory Coast) Christian Kouamé	28	(Greece) Aris	Undisclosed		

==== Loans out ====
Date	Pos.	Player	Age	Moving to	Fee	Notes	Ref.
3 January 2026	MF	(Argentina) Gino Infantino	22	(Argentina) Argentinos Juniors	Loan	Obligation to buy under certain conditions	
7 January 2026	GK	(Italy) Tommaso Martinelli	20	(Italy) Sampdoria	Loan	Until end of season	
22 January 2026	MF	(Switzerland) Simon Sohm	24	(Italy) Bologna	Loan	Option to buy	
22 January 2026	MF	(Morocco) Amir Richardson	23	(Denmark) Copenhagen	Loan	Option to buy	
31 January 2026	FW	(Angola) M'Bala Nzola	29	(Italy) Sassuolo	Loan	Option to buy	

== Competitions ==
=== Overall record ===
Competition	First match	Last match	Starting round	Final position	Record							
Competition	First match	Last match	Starting round	Final position	Pld	W	D	L	GF	GA	GD	Win %
Serie A	24 August 2025	22 May 2026	Matchday 1	15th	38	9	15	14	41	50	−9	23.68
Coppa Italia	27 January 2026		Round of 16	Round of 16	1	0	0	1	1	3	−2	0.00
UEFA Conference League	21 August 2025	16 April 2026	Play-off round	Quarter-finals	14	9	0	5	25	17	+8	64.29
Total					53	18	15	20	67	70	−3	33.96

Source: Soccerway

=== Serie A ===
==== League table ====
Pos	Team	Pld	W	D	L	GF	GA	GD	Pts
13	Parma	38	11	12	15	28	46	−18	45 (Note: Torino finished ahead of Parma on head-to-head goal difference: Parma 2–1 Torino, Torino 4–1 Parma.)
14	Cagliari	38	11	10	17	40	53	−13	43
15	Fiorentina	38	9	15	14	41	50	−9	42
16	Genoa	38	10	11	17	41	51	−10	41
17	Lecce	38	10	8	20	28	50	−22	38

Source: Serie A
Rules for classification: 1) Points; 2) Tiebreaker for Champions team and third relegated team; 3) Head-to-head points; 4) Head-to-head goal difference; 5) Goal difference; 6) Goals scored; 7) Draw.
(Note: Head-to-head record is used only after all the matches between the teams in question have been played)

==== Results summary ====
Overall								Home						Away					
Pld	W	D	L	GF	GA	GD	Pts	W	D	L	GF	GA	GD	W	D	L	GF	GA	GD
38	9	15	14	41	50	−9	42	4	9	6	21	21	0	5	6	8	20	29	−9

Source: Serie A

==== Results by round ====
Round	1	2	3	4	5	6	7	8	9	10	11	12	13	14	15	16	17	18	19	20	21	22	23	24	25	26	27	28	29	30	31	32	33	34	35	36	37	38
Ground	A	A	H	H	A	H	A	H	A	H	A	H	A	A	H	H	A	H	A	H	A	H	A	H	A	H	A	H	A	H	A	H	A	H	A	H	A	H
Result	D	D	L	L	D	L	L	D	L	L	D	D	L	L	L	W	L	W	D	D	W	L	L	D	W	W	L	D	W	D	W	W	D	D	L	D	W	D
Position	9	12	16	17	16	17	18	18	19	20	20	19	19	20	20	20	20	18	18	18	17	18	18	18	18	16	16	17	16	16	15	15	15	15	16	15	15	15

Source: Serie A
A = Away; H = Home; W = Win; D = Draw; L = Loss; P = Postponed

==== Matches ====
The match schedule was released on 6 June 2025.

24 August 2025 1	Cagliari	1–1	Fiorentina	Cagliari
18:30 CEST (UTC+2)	Obert (yellow card) 43'; Borrelli (yellow card) 45+1'; Mazzitelli (yellow card) 82'; Luperto 90+4'; Kılıçsoy (yellow card) 90+7'	Report	Mandragora 68'; Pongračić (yellow card) 71'; Marí (yellow card) 79'	Stadium: Unipol Domus; Attendance: 15,723; Referee: Simone Sozza

31 August 2025 2	Torino	0–0	Fiorentina	Turin
18:30 CEST (UTC+2)	Vlašić (yellow card) 37'; Lazaro (yellow card) 86'	Report	Sohm (yellow card) 19'; Pongračić (yellow card) 73'	Stadium: Stadio Olimpico Grande Torino; Attendance: 20,127; Referee: Rosario Abisso

13 September 2025 3	Fiorentina	1–3	Napoli	Florence
20:45 CEST (UTC+2)	Ranieri 79'	Report	De Bruyne 6' (pen.); Højlund 14'; Beukema 51'	Stadium: Stadio Artemio Franchi; Attendance: 21,579; Referee: Luca Zufferli

21 September 2025 4	Fiorentina	1–2	Como	Florence
18:00 CEST (UTC+2)	Mandragora 6'; Pongračić (yellow card) 30'; Ranieri (yellow card) 68'; Dodô (yellow card) 88'; Sohm (yellow card) 89'	Report	Vojvoda (yellow card) 7'; Roberto (yellow card) 50'; Kempf 65', (yellow card) 77'; Addai 90+4'	Stadium: Stadio Artemio Franchi; Attendance: 21,158; Referee: Kevin Bonacina

28 September 2025 5	Pisa	0–0	Fiorentina	Pisa
15:00 CEST (UTC+2)		Report	Kean (yellow card) 42'	Stadium: Stadio Romeo Anconetani; Attendance: 11,210; Referee: Gianluca Manganiello

5 October 2025 6	Fiorentina	1–2	Roma	Florence
15:00 CEST (UTC+2)	Kean 14'; Guðmundsson (yellow card) 43'; Marí (yellow card) 70'	Report	Cristante (yellow card) 3', (goal) 30'; Soulé 22'; Tsimikas (yellow card) 65'; Wesley (yellow card) 68'	Stadium: Stadio Artemio Franchi; Attendance: 20,548; Referee: Andrea Colombo

19 October 2025 7	Milan	2–1	Fiorentina	Milan
20:45 CEST (UTC+2)	Athekame (yellow card) 50'; Fofana (yellow card) 60'; Leão 63', 86' (pen.); Tomori (yellow card) 74'	Report	Nicolussi Caviglia (yellow card) 54'; Gosens 55'; Parisi (yellow card) 85'; Ranieri (yellow card) 88'	Stadium: San Siro; Attendance: 71,475; Referee: Livio Marinelli

26 October 2025 8	Fiorentina	2–2	Bologna	Florence
18:00 CET (UTC+1)	Gosens (yellow card) 36'; Guðmundsson 74' (pen.); Kean 90+4' (pen.); Džeko (yellow card) 90+6'	Report	Castro 25'; Freuler (yellow card) 39'; Cambiaghi 52'; Holm (yellow card) 71' (yellow-red card) 83'; Rowe (yellow card) 87'; Lucumí (yellow card) 90+6'	Stadium: Stadio Artemio Franchi; Attendance: 19,445; Referee: Federico La Penna

29 October 2025 9	Internazionale	3–0	Fiorentina	Milan
20:45 CET (UTC+1)	Esposito (yellow card) 65'; Çalhanoğlu 66', 88' (pen.); Sučić 71'	Report	Viti (yellow card) 49' (yellow-red card) 86'	Stadium: San Siro; Attendance: 71,096; Referee: Simone Sozza

2 November 2025 10	Fiorentina	0–1	Lecce	Florence
15:00 CET (UTC+1)	Nicolussi Caviglia (yellow card) 14'; Fagioli (yellow card) 15'; Kean (yellow card) 66'; Ranieri (yellow card) 87'	Report	Berisha 23'; Veiga (yellow card) 41'	Stadium: Stadio Artemio Franchi; Attendance: 18,184; Referee: Antonio Rapuano

9 November 2025 11	Genoa	2–2	Fiorentina	Genoa
15:00 CET (UTC+1)	Østigård 15'; Colombo (penalty missed) 50', 60'; Martín (yellow card) 67'; Ellertsson (yellow card) 84'	Report	Guðmundsson 20' (pen.); Pongračić (yellow card) 23'; Ranieri (yellow card) 42'; Piccoli 57'; Dodô (yellow card) 89'	Stadium: Stadio Luigi Ferraris; Attendance: 31,449; Referee: Marco Guida

22 November 2025 12	Fiorentina	1–1	Juventus	Florence
18:00 CET (UTC+1)	Fagioli (yellow card) 7'; Mandragora 48', (yellow card) 84'; Parisi (yellow card) 87'	Report	McKennie (yellow card) 42'; Kostić 45+6'; Cabal (yellow card) 84'; Miretti (yellow card) 90+3'	Stadium: Stadio Artemio Franchi; Attendance: 22,346; Referee: Daniele Doveri

30 November 2025 13	Atalanta	2–0	Fiorentina	Bergamo
18:00 CET (UTC+1)	Kossounou 41'; Lookman 52'; Hien (yellow card) 84'	Report	Pongračić (yellow card) 59'; Marí (yellow card) 69'; Mandragora (yellow card) 71'	Stadium: Gewiss Stadium; Attendance: 21,591; Referee: Matteo Marcenaro

6 December 2025 14	Sassuolo	3–1	Fiorentina	Reggio Emilia
15:00 CET (UTC+1)	Muric (yellow card) 7'; Volpato 14'; Thorstvedt (yellow card) 17'; Muharemović 45+1'; Koné 65'	Report	Mandragora 9' (pen.), (yellow card) 90+6'; Ndour (yellow card) 90+3'; Viti (yellow card) 90+5'	Stadium: Mapei Stadium – Città del Tricolore; Attendance: 14,285; Referee: Luca Pairetto

14 December 2025 15	Fiorentina	1–2	Hellas Verona	Florence
15:00 CET (UTC+1)	Guðmundsson (yellow card) 36'; Nuñez 69' (o.g.)	Report	Niasse (yellow card) 25'; Frese (yellow card) 32'; Al-Musrati (yellow card) 39'; Orban 42', 90+3'; Belghali (yellow card) 86'; Nuñez (yellow card) 90+5'	Stadium: Stadio Artemio Franchi; Attendance: 20,967; Referee: Andrea Colombo

21 December 2025 16	Fiorentina	5–1	Udinese	Florence
18:00 CET (UTC+1)	Mandragora 21'; Parisi (yellow card) 40'; Guðmundsson 42'; Ndour 45+5'; Kean 56', 69'; Ranieri (yellow card) 65'; Nicolussi Caviglia (yellow card) 85'	Report	Okoye (red card) 8'; Zanoli (yellow card) 39'; Solet 66'	Stadium: Stadio Artemio Franchi; Attendance: 18,405; Referee: Maurizio Mariani

27 December 2025 17	Parma	1–0	Fiorentina	Parma
12:30 CET (UTC+1)	Circati (yellow card) 20'; Sørensen 48'; Corvi (yellow card) 87'	Report	Mandragora (yellow card) 22'; Pongračić (yellow card) 90+3'	Stadium: Stadio Ennio Tardini; Attendance: 20,658; Referee: Marco Guida

4 January 2026 18	Fiorentina	1–0	Cremonese	Florence
15:00 CET (UTC+1)	Dodô (yellow card) 42'; Kean 90+2'	Report	Bondo (yellow card) 20'; Payero (yellow card) 42'	Stadium: Stadio Artemio Franchi; Attendance: 19,827; Referee: Federico La Penna

7 January 2026 19	Lazio	2–2	Fiorentina	Rome
20:45 CET (UTC+1)	Cancellieri (yellow card) 26'; Cataldi 52'; Zaccagni (yellow card) 83'; Pellegrini (yellow card) 90+1'; Pedro 90+5' (pen.)	Report	Pongračić (yellow card) 20'; Gosens (yellow card) 21', (goal) 56'; Parisi (yellow card) 55'; Fagioli (yellow card) 71'; Guðmundsson 89' (pen.); Nicolussi Caviglia (yellow card) 90+8'	Stadium: Stadio Olimpico; Attendance: 35,000; Referee: Simone Sozza

11 January 2026 20	Fiorentina	1–1	Milan	Florence
15:00 CET (UTC+1)	Kean (yellow card) 31'; Comuzzo 66'; Fagioli (yellow card) 80'	Report	Estupiñán (yellow card) 53'; Rabiot (yellow card) 84'; Nkunku 90'; Fofana (yellow card) 90+4'	Stadium: Stadio Artemio Franchi; Attendance: 22,171; Referee: Davide Massa

18 January 2026 21	Bologna	1–2	Fiorentina	Bologna
15:00 CET (UTC+1)	Holm (yellow card) 38'; Miranda (yellow card) 77'; Fabbian 88'; Ferguson (yellow card) 90'	Report	Mandragora 19'; Piccoli 45'	Stadium: Stadio Renato Dall'Ara; Attendance: 27,590; Referee: Daniele Doveri

24 January 2026 22	Fiorentina	1–2	Cagliari	Florence
18:00 CET (UTC+1)	Pongračić (yellow card) 56'; Brescianini 74'; Comuzzo (yellow card) 90+1'	Report	Kılıçsoy 31'; Palestra 47'; Caprile (yellow card) 63'; Mina (yellow card) 85'; Zé Pedro (yellow card) 87'	Stadium: Stadio Artemio Franchi; Attendance: 20,456; Referee: Marco Guida

31 January 2026 23	Napoli	2–1	Fiorentina	Naples
18:00 CET (UTC+1)	Vergara 11'; Gutiérrez 49'; Buongiorno (yellow card) 54'	Report	Fabbian (yellow card) 44'; Solomon 57'	Stadium: Stadio Diego Armando Maradona; Attendance: 40,000; Referee: Federico La Penna

7 February 2026 24	Fiorentina	2–2	Torino	Florence
20:45 CET (UTC+1)	Dodô (yellow card) 40'; Solomon 51'; Kean 57'; Comuzzo (yellow card) 90+3'	Report	Casadei 26'; Lazaro (yellow card) 31'; Maripán (yellow card) 64', (goal) 90+4'; Marianucci (yellow card) 66'; Gineitis (yellow card) 90'; Aboukhlal (yellow card) 90+5'	Stadium: Stadio Artemio Franchi; Attendance: 19,178; Referee: Andrea Colombo

14 February 2026 25	Como	1–2	Fiorentina	Como
15:00 CET (UTC+1)	Kempf (yellow card) 49'; Parisi 77' (o.g.); Rodríguez (yellow card) 82'; Morata (yellow card) 88' (yellow-red card) 89'	Report	Fagioli 26'; Kean 54' (pen.); Mandragora (yellow card) 88'; Ranieri (yellow card) 90'	Stadium: Stadio Giuseppe Sinigaglia; Attendance: 11,387; Referee: Matteo Marchetti

23 February 2026 26	Fiorentina	1–0	Pisa	Florence
18:30 CET (UTC+1)	Kean 13'; Dodô (yellow card) 47'; Fabbian (yellow card) 90+2'; Fazzini (yellow card) 90+2'	Report	Caracciolo (yellow card) 37'; Marin (yellow card) 62'; Cuadrado (yellow card) 79'	Stadium: Stadio Artemio Franchi; Attendance: 21,896; Referee: Maurizio Mariani

2 March 2026 27	Udinese	3–0	Fiorentina	Udine
20:45 CET (UTC+1)	Kabasele 10'; Ehizibue (yellow card) 32'; Davis 64' (pen.); Buksa 90+4'	Report	Pongračić (yellow card) 28'; Parisi (yellow card) 32'; Rugani (yellow card) 61'; Ranieri (yellow card) 80'	Stadium: Stadio Friuli; Attendance: 18,265; Referee: Luca Pairetto

8 March 2026 28	Fiorentina	0–0	Parma	Florence
15:00 CET (UTC+1)	Mandragora (yellow card) 61'; Dodô (yellow card) 90'	Report		Stadium: Stadio Artemio Franchi; Attendance: 20,534; Referee: Luca Zufferli

16 March 2026 29	Cremonese	1–4	Fiorentina	Cremona
20:45 CET (UTC+1)	Bondo (yellow card) 27'; Okereke 57'	Report	Parisi 25'; Piccoli 32'; Dodô 49'; Guðmundsson 70'	Stadium: Stadio Giovanni Zini; Attendance: 11,030; Referee: Marco Di Bello

22 March 2026 30	Fiorentina	1–1	Internazionale	Florence
20:45 CET (UTC+1)	Brescianini (yellow card) 56'; Ndour (yellow card) 62', (goal) 78'; Kean (yellow card) 66'	Report	Esposito 1'; Dimarco (yellow card) 43'; Carlos Augusto (yellow card) 45'; Barella (yellow card) 63'	Stadium: Stadio Artemio Franchi; Attendance: 22,335; Referee: Andrea Colombo

4 April 2026 31	Hellas Verona	0–1	Fiorentina	Verona
18:00 CEST (UTC+2)	Gagliardini (yellow card) 17'; Nelsson (yellow card) 79'; Suslov (red card) 86'; Belghali (yellow card) 88'	Report	Fagioli 82', (yellow card) 84'; Guðmundsson (red card) 86'	Stadium: Stadio Marcantonio Bentegodi; Attendance: 24,501; Referee: Marco Guida

13 April 2026 32	Fiorentina	1–0	Lazio	Florence
20:45 CEST (UTC+2)	Gosens 28'; Rugani (yellow card) 31'; Dodô (yellow card) 80'; Piccoli (yellow card) 90+1'	Report	Noslin (yellow card) 64'; Pedro (yellow card) 90+4'	Stadium: Stadio Artemio Franchi; Attendance: 18,259; Referee: Michael Fabbri

20 April 2026 33	Lecce	1–1	Fiorentina	Lecce
20:45 CEST (UTC+2)	Pierotti (yellow card) 62'; Tiago Gabriel 71', (yellow card) 72'	Report	Harrison 30'; De Gea (yellow card) 76'; Pongračić (yellow card) 80'; Fazzini (yellow card) 82'; Solomon (yellow card) 90+1'	Stadium: Stadio Via del mare Attendance: 26,366; Referee: Fabio Maresca

26 April 2026 34	Fiorentina	0–0	Sassuolo	Florence
12:30 CEST (UTC+2)	Ranieri (yellow card) 30'; Mandragora (yellow card) 57'	Report	Laurienté (yellow card) 81'	Stadium: Stadio Artemio Franchi; Attendance: 21,700; Referee: Livio Marinelli

4 May 2026 35	Roma	4–0	Fiorentina	Rome
20:45 CEST (UTC+2)	Mancini 13'; Wesley 17'; Hermoso 34', (yellow card) 48'; Pisilli 58'; El Shaarawy (yellow card) 90+2'	Report	Pongračić (yellow card) 25'; Parisi (yellow card) 66'	Stadium: Stadio Olimpico; Attendance: 61,307; Referee: Luca Zufferli

10 May 2026 36	Fiorentina	0–0	Genoa	Florence
15:00 CEST (UTC+2)		Report		Stadium: Stadio Artemio Franchi; Attendance: 19,000; Referee: Luca Massimi

17 May 2026 37	Juventus	0–2	Fiorentina	Turin
12:00 CEST (UTC+2)	Bremer (yellow card) 44'	Report	Pongračić (yellow card) 22'; Ndour 34'; Ranieri (red card) 73'; Mandragora 83'; Harrison (yellow card) 85'; Guðmundsson (yellow card) 90+1'	Stadium: Juventus Stadium; Attendance: 41,676; Referee: Davide Massa
Note: Ranieri received a red card after being substituted from the match.

22 May 2026 38	Fiorentina	1–1	Atalanta	Florence
20:45 CEST (UTC+2)	Piccoli 39'	Report	Sulemana (yellow card) 47'; Ahanor (yellow card) 60'; Comuzzo 82' (o.g.)	Stadium: Stadio Artemio Franchi; Attendance: 19,606; Referee: Mario Perri

=== Coppa Italia ===
27 January 2026 Round of 16	Fiorentina	1–3	Como	Florence
21:00 CET (UTC+1)	Piccoli 7'; Brescianini (yellow card) 33'; Comuzzo (yellow card) 80'	Report	Roberto 20'; Van Der Brempt (yellow card) 38'; Diego Carlos (yellow card) 59'; Paz 60', (yellow card) 77'; Kühn (yellow card) 81'; Morata 90+1', (yellow card) 90+4'	Stadium: Stadio Artemio Franchi; Attendance: 10,472; Referee: Giovanni Ayroldi

=== UEFA Conference League ===
==== Play-off round ====
The draw for the play-off round was held on 4 August 2025.

21 August 2025 First leg	Polissya Zhytomyr (Ukraine)	0–3	(Italy) Fiorentina	Prešov, Slovakia
20:00 CEST (UTC+2)	Korniychuk (yellow card) 57'	Report	Kudryk 8' (o.g.); Gosens 32', (yellow card) 39'; Kean (red card) 44'; Guðmundsson 69'	Stadium: Futbal Tatran Arena; Attendance: 6,173; Referee: Aliyar Aghayev (Azerbaijan)
Note: Due to the Russian invasion of Ukraine, Ukrainian teams were required to play their home matches at neutral venues until further notice.

28 August 2025 Second leg	Fiorentina (Italy)	3–2 (6–2 agg.)	(Ukraine) Polissya Zhytomyr	Reggio Emilia, Italy
20:00 CEST (UTC+2)	Dodô 78'; Ranieri 86'; Džeko 89'	Report	Nazarenko 2'; Andriyevskyi 14'; Costa (yellow card) 45'; Karaman (yellow card) 84'	Stadium: Mapei Stadium – Città del Tricolore; Attendance: 5,033; Referee: Ricardo de Burgos Bengoetxea (Spain)
Note: The match was played at the Mapei Stadium – Città del Tricolore in Reggio Emilia, instead of Fiorentina's regular stadium, Stadio Artemio Franchi in Florence, due to renovation works.

==== League phase ====
The draw for the league phase was held on 29 August 2025.

Pos	Team	Pld	W	D	L	GF	GA	GD	Pts	Qualification
13	(Football Association of Slovenia) Celje	6	3	1	2	8	7	+1	10	Advance to knockout phase play-offs (seeded)
14	(Royal Dutch Football Association) AZ	6	3	1	2	7	7	0	10	Advance to knockout phase play-offs (seeded)
15	(Italian Football Federation) Fiorentina	6	3	0	3	8	5	+3	9	Advance to knockout phase play-offs (seeded)
16	(Croatian Football Federation) Rijeka	6	2	3	1	5	2	+3	9	Advance to knockout phase play-offs (seeded)
17	(Polish Football Association) Jagiellonia Białystok	6	2	3	1	5	4	+1	9	Advance to knockout phase play-offs (unseeded)

Source: UEFA
Rules for classification: League phase tiebreakers

Round	1	2	3	4	5	6
Ground	H	A	A	H	H	A
Result	W	W	L	L	W	L
Position	8	1	8	17	11	15

Source: UEFA
A = Away; H = Home; W = Win; D = Draw; L = Loss

2 October 2025 1	Fiorentina (Italy)	2–0	(Czech Republic) Sigma Olomouc	Florence, Italy
21:00 CEST (UTC+2)	Fagioli (yellow card) 25'; Piccoli 27'; Ndour (yellow card) 62', (goal) 90+5'; De Gea (yellow card) 84'	Report	Kostadinov (yellow card) 64'	Stadium: Stadio Artemio Franchi; Attendance: 8,149; Referee: Florian Badstübner (Germany)

23 October 2025 2	Rapid Wien (Austria)	0–3	(Italy) Fiorentina	Vienna, Austria
18:45 CEST (UTC+2)	Kara (yellow card) 35'; Seidl (yellow card) 61'	Report	Ndour 9'; Comuzzo (yellow card) 30'; Džeko 48'; Guðmundsson 88'	Stadium: Allianz Stadion; Attendance: 24,641; Referee: Yigal Frid (Israel)

6 November 2025 3	Mainz 05 (Germany)	2–1	(Italy) Fiorentina	Mainz, Germany
18:45 EET (UTC+1)	Maloney (yellow card) 48'; Nebel (yellow card) 62'; Amiri (yellow card) 67'; Hollerbach 68'; Lee Jae-sung 90+5'	Report	Sohm 16'; Ndour (yellow card) 50'; Marí (yellow card) 63'; Pongračić (yellow card) 90+6'	Stadium: Mewa Arena; Attendance: 30,300; Referee: Lawrence Visser (Belgium)

27 November 2025 4	Fiorentina (Italy)	0–1	(Greece) AEK Athens	Florence, Italy
21:00 CET (UTC+1)	Guðmundsson (yellow card) 44'; Pongračić (yellow card) 69'; Mandragora (yellow card) 90+8'	Report	Gaćinović 35'; Pereyra (yellow card) 63'; Pilios (yellow card) 64'	Stadium: Stadio Artemio Franchi; Attendance: 10,964; Referee: Robert Jones (England)

11 December 2025 5	Fiorentina (Italy)	2–1	(Ukraine) Dynamo Kyiv	Florence, Italy
18:45 CET (UTC+1)	Kean 18'; Ndour (yellow card) 44'; Guðmundsson 74', (yellow card) 83'; Kouadio (yellow card) 90+3'	Report	Dubinchak (yellow card) 52'; Mykhaylenko 55'; Thiaré (yellow card) 85'; Vivcharenko (yellow card) 90'	Stadium: Stadio Artemio Franchi; Attendance: 8,750; Referee: Miloš Milanović (Serbia)

18 December 2025 6	Lausanne-Sport (Switzerland)	1–0	(Italy) Fiorentina	Lausanne, Switzerland
21:00 CET (UTC+1)	Sigua 58'; Lekweiry (yellow card) 90'	Report	Kean (yellow card) 73'; Fortini (yellow card) 85'	Stadium: Stade de la Tuilière; Attendance: 11,971; Referee: Lothar D'Hondt (Belgium)

==== Knockout phase ====
===== Knockout phase play-offs =====
The draw for the knockout phase play-offs was held on 16 January 2026.

19 February 2026 First leg	Jagiellonia Białystok (Poland)	0–3	(Italy) Fiorentina	Białystok, Poland
21:00 WET (UTC±0)	Wdowik (yellow card) 78'	Report	Fazzini (yellow card) 21'; Mandragora (yellow card) 41', (goal) 65'; Ranieri 53'; Lezzerini (yellow card) 76'; Piccoli 81' (pen.)	Stadium: Stadion Miejski; Attendance: 18,531; Referee: Sebastian Gishamer (Austria)

26 February 2026 Second leg	Fiorentina (Italy)	2–4 (a.e.t.) (5–4 agg.)	(Poland) Jagiellonia Białystok	Florence, Italy
18:45 CET (UTC+1)	Comuzzo (yellow card) 7'; Pongračić (yellow card) 77'; Dodô (yellow card) 101'; Fagioli 107'; Romanczuk 114' (o.g.)	Report	Jóźwiak (yellow card) 17'; Mazurek 23', 45+3', 49'; Baždar (yellow card) 75'; Pozo (yellow card) 94'; Romanczuk (yellow card) 105+1'; Vital (yellow card) 110' (yellow-red card) 120'; Imaz 118'	Stadium: Stadio Artemio Franchi; Attendance: 9,431; Referee: Srđan Jovanović (Serbia)

===== Round of 16 =====
The draw for the round of 16 was held on 27 February 2026.

12 March 2026 First leg	Fiorentina (Italy)	2–1	(Poland) Raków Częstochowa	Florence, Italy
21:00 CET (UTC+1)	Ranieri (yellow card) 48'; Ndour 62'; Parisi (yellow card) 85'; Guðmundsson 90+3' (pen.); Fagioli (yellow card) 90+6'	Report	Struski (yellow card) 32'; Brunes 60'; Tudor (yellow card) 81'; Zych (yellow card) 90+6'	Stadium: Stadio Artemio Franchi; Attendance: 7,852; Referee: Georgi Kabakov (Bulgaria)

19 March 2026 Second leg	Raków Częstochowa (Poland)	1–2 (2–4 agg.)	(Italy) Fiorentina	Sosnowiec, Poland
18:45 WET (UTC±0)	Struski 46'; Rocha (yellow card) 85'; Brunes (yellow card) 86'	Report	Ndour 68'; Dodô (yellow card) 72'; Ndour (yellow card) 85'; Pongračić (yellow card) 90+5', (goal) 90+7'	Stadium: Zagłębie Sports Park; Attendance: 11,043; Referee: Juan Martínez Munuera (Spain)

===== Quarter-finals =====
The draw for the quarter-finals was held on 27 February 2026, after the draw for the round of 16.

9 April 2026 First leg	Crystal Palace (England)	3–0	(Italy) Fiorentina	London, England
20:00 BST (UTC+1)	Mateta 24' (pen.); Mitchell 31'; Richards (yellow card) 76'; Sarr 90'	Report	Dodô (yellow card) 21'; Piccoli (yellow card) 69'	Stadium: Selhurst Park; Attendance: 22,775; Referee: Donatas Rumšas (Lithuania)

16 April 2026 Second leg	Fiorentina (Italy)	2–1 (2–4 agg.)	(England) Crystal Palace	Florence, Italy
21:00 CEST (UTC+2)	Guðmundsson 30' (pen.); Pongračić (yellow card) 40'; Comuzzo (yellow card) 45+5'; Ndour 53', (yellow card) 87'; Ranieri (yellow card) 67'; Piccoli (yellow card) 90+1'	Report	Sarr 17', (yellow card) 53'; Pino (yellow card) 40'; Riad (yellow card) 76'	Stadium: Stadio Artemio Franchi; Attendance: 21,045; Referee: Jesús Gil Manzano (Spain)

== Squad statistics ==
No.	Pos	Nat	Player	Total		Serie A		Coppa Italia		UEFA Conference League	
No.	Pos	Nat	Player	Apps	Goals	Apps	Goals	Apps	Goals	Apps	Goals
Goalkeepers
1	GK	(Italy) ITA	Luca Lezzerini	3	0	0+1	0	0	0	2	0
43	GK	(Spain) ESP	David de Gea	46	0	37	0	0	0	8+1	0
53	GK	(Denmark) DEN	Oliver Christensen	4	0	1	0	1	0	2	0
Defenders
2	DF	(Brazil) BRA	Dodô	47	2	36	1	0	0	8+3	1
3	DF	(Italy) ITA	Daniele Rugani	6	0	4+2	0	0	0	0	0
5	DF	(Croatia) CRO	Marin Pongračić	48	1	33+2	0	0+1	0	9+3	1
6	DF	(Italy) ITA	Luca Ranieri	45	3	29+5	1	1	0	9+1	2
15	DF	(Italy) ITA	Pietro Comuzzo	41	1	18+9	1	1	0	10+3	0
21	DF	(Germany) GER	Robin Gosens	36	4	24+2	3	0+1	0	7+2	1
26	DF	(Italy) ITA	Mattia Viti	16	0	2+8	0	0	0	4+2	0
29	DF	(Italy) ITA	Niccolò Fortini	26	0	2+14	0	1	0	7+2	0
48	DF	(Ghana) GHA	Tariq Lamptey	2	0	1+1	0	0	0	0	0
60	DF	(Italy) ITA	Eddy Kouadio	8	0	0+3	0	0	0	1+4	0
62	DF	(Venezuela) VEN	Luis Balbo	10	0	1+5	0	1	0	0+3	0
65	DF	(Italy) ITA	Fabiano Parisi	32	1	18+5	1	0	0	5+4	0
Midfielders
4	MF	(Italy) ITA	Marco Brescianini	18	0	10+7	0	1	0	0	0
8	MF	(Italy) ITA	Rolando Mandragora	47	8	30+4	7	0	0	7+6	1
11	MF	(Morocco) MAR	Abdelhamid Sabiri	2	0	0+1	0	0	0	0+1	0
17	MF	(England) ENG	Jack Harrison	22	1	10+5	1	1	0	4+2	0
22	MF	(Italy) ITA	Jacopo Fazzini	32	0	5+15	0	1	0	6+5	0
27	MF	(Italy) ITA	Cher Ndour	47	7	20+13	3	1	0	12+1	4
44	MF	(Italy) ITA	Nicolò Fagioli	45	3	30+3	2	0+1	0	7+4	1
80	MF	(Italy) ITA	Giovanni Fabbian	22	0	4+11	0	1	0	5+1	0
Forwards
10	FW	(Iceland) ISL	Albert Guðmundsson	46	10	27+6	5	0+1	0	4+8	5
19	FW	(Israel) ISR	Manor Solomon	19	2	9+7	2	0+1	0	1+1	0
20	FW	(Italy) ITA	Moise Kean	33	9	23+3	8	0	0	3+4	1
61	FW	(Italy) ITA	Riccardo Braschi	3	0	1+1	0	0	0	0+1	0
69	FW	(Italy) ITA	Giorgio Puzzoli	1	0	0	0	0	0	0+1	0
91	FW	(Italy) ITA	Roberto Piccoli	43	8	16+16	4	1	1	9+1	3
Players transferred/loaned out during the season
7	MF	(Switzerland) SUI	Simon Sohm	21	1	9+7	0	0	0	3+2	1
9	FW	(Bosnia and Herzegovina) BIH	Edin Džeko	18	2	2+9	0	0	0	6+1	2
14	MF	(Italy) ITA	Hans Nicolussi Caviglia	16	0	7+4	0	0	0	5	0
18	DF	(Spain) ESP	Pablo Marí	16	0	9+2	0	0	0	5	0
24	MF	(Morocco) MAR	Amir Richardson	4	0	0+2	0	0	0	2	0
30	GK	(Italy) ITA	Tommaso Martinelli	2	0	0	0	0	0	2	0
99	FW	(Ivory Coast) CIV	Christian Kouamé	4	0	0+2	0	0	0	1+1	0

Source: Competitions
