= Pietro Comuzzo =

Italian footballer (born 2005)

Personal information
- Date of birth: 20 February 2005 (age 21)
- Place of birth: San Daniele del Friuli, Italy
- Height: 1.85 m (6 ft 1 in)
- Position: Centre-back

Team information
- Current team: Torino (on loan from Fiorentina)
- Number: 15

Youth career
- 2011–2015: Tricesimo
- 2016–2017: Udinese
- 2017–2018: Pordenone
- 2018–2023: Fiorentina

Senior career*
Years	Team	Apps	(Gls)
2023–	Fiorentina	64	(2)
2026–	→ Torino (loan)	10	(0)

International career^{‡}
2022	Italy U17	2	(0)
2023	Italy U18	3	(0)
2023–2024	Italy U20	4	(0)
2025–	Italy U21	8	(0)
2026–	Italy	2	(0)
- * Club domestic league appearances and goals as of 7 November 2026 ‡ National team caps and goals as of 16 November 2026

Pietro Comuzzo (born 20 February 2005) is an Italian professional footballer who plays as a centre-back for Serie A club Torino, on loan from Fiorentina, and the Italy national team.

== Club career ==
=== Early career ===
Born in San Daniele del Friuli, Comuzzo started playing football at local grassroots club Tricesimo at the age of six, before joining the youth sectors of Udinese and Pordenone.

=== Fiorentina ===
He moved to Fiorentina's academy in 2019. Comuzzo then came through the Viola's youth ranks, being named as captain of the under-18 squad, before being promoted to the under-19 team in the first months of 2023. In March of the same year, he signed his first professional contract with Fiorentina, penning a deal until 2025, with an option for another year. During the same season, Comuzzo helped the under-19 team win the Supercoppa Primavera, as they also reached the Coppa Italia final.

At the start of the 2023–24 season, he started training with the first team, under manager Vincenzo Italiano. On 8 October 2023, the defender made his professional (and Serie A) debut for Fiorentina, coming on as a substitute for Jonathan Ikoné in a 3–1 league win over Napoli. On 26 October, Comuzzo made his debut in a continental tournament, coming on for injured Michael Kayode in the sixth minute of a 6–0 win over Čukarički in the UEFA Europa Conference League group stage.

On 17 August 2024, he made his first professional start in a 1–1 league draw against Parma.

==== Loan to Torino ====
During the summer of 2026, Comuzzo joined fellow Serie A club Torino, on loan for the 2026–27 season.

== International career ==
Comuzzo has represented Italy at under-17, under-18 and under-20 level.

He received his first call-up to the Italian under-20 national team in September 2023.

On 8 November 2024, coach Luciano Spalletti included Comuzzo in the Italy senior team squad for UEFA Nations League fixtures against Belgium and France. In May 2026, he was one of the players who were called up with the Italy national senior squad by interim head coach Silvio Baldini, for the friendly matches against Luxembourg and Greece on 3 and 7 June 2026, respectively.

== Style of play ==
Comuzzo is a centre-back who can play either in a back four or a back three, but can also cover the right-back role. He has been regarded for his physical attributes, his marking abilities and his technique. A fairly sporting player, he has also been described as an aerial threat from set pieces and a leader of the defense.

== Personal life ==
Comuzzo has a twin brother, Francesco: they played together for the youth teams of Tricesimo, Udinese, Pordenone and Fiorentina until 2020, when Francesco was released by the latter club.

He lost his mother to cancer in 2023.

== Career statistics ==
=== Club ===
As of match played 22 May 2026

Appearances and goals by club, season and competition
Club	Season	League			Coppa Italia		Europe		Total	
Club	Season	Division	Apps	Goals	Apps	Goals	Apps	Goals	Apps	Goals
Fiorentina	2023–24	Serie A	4	0	1	0	1 (Note: Appearance in UEFA Europa Conference League)	0	6	0
Fiorentina	2024–25	Serie A	33	1	1	0	10 (Note: Appearances in UEFA Conference League)	0	44	1
Fiorentina	2025–26	Serie A	27	1	1	0	13	0	41	1
Career total			64	2	3	0	24	0	91	2

=== International ===
As of match played 7 June 2026

Appearances and goals by national team and year
National team	Year	Apps	Goals
Italy	2026	2	0
Total		2	0

== Honours ==
=== Fiorentina U19 ===
- Supercoppa Primavera: 2022–23
