= Niccolò Fortini =

Italian footballer

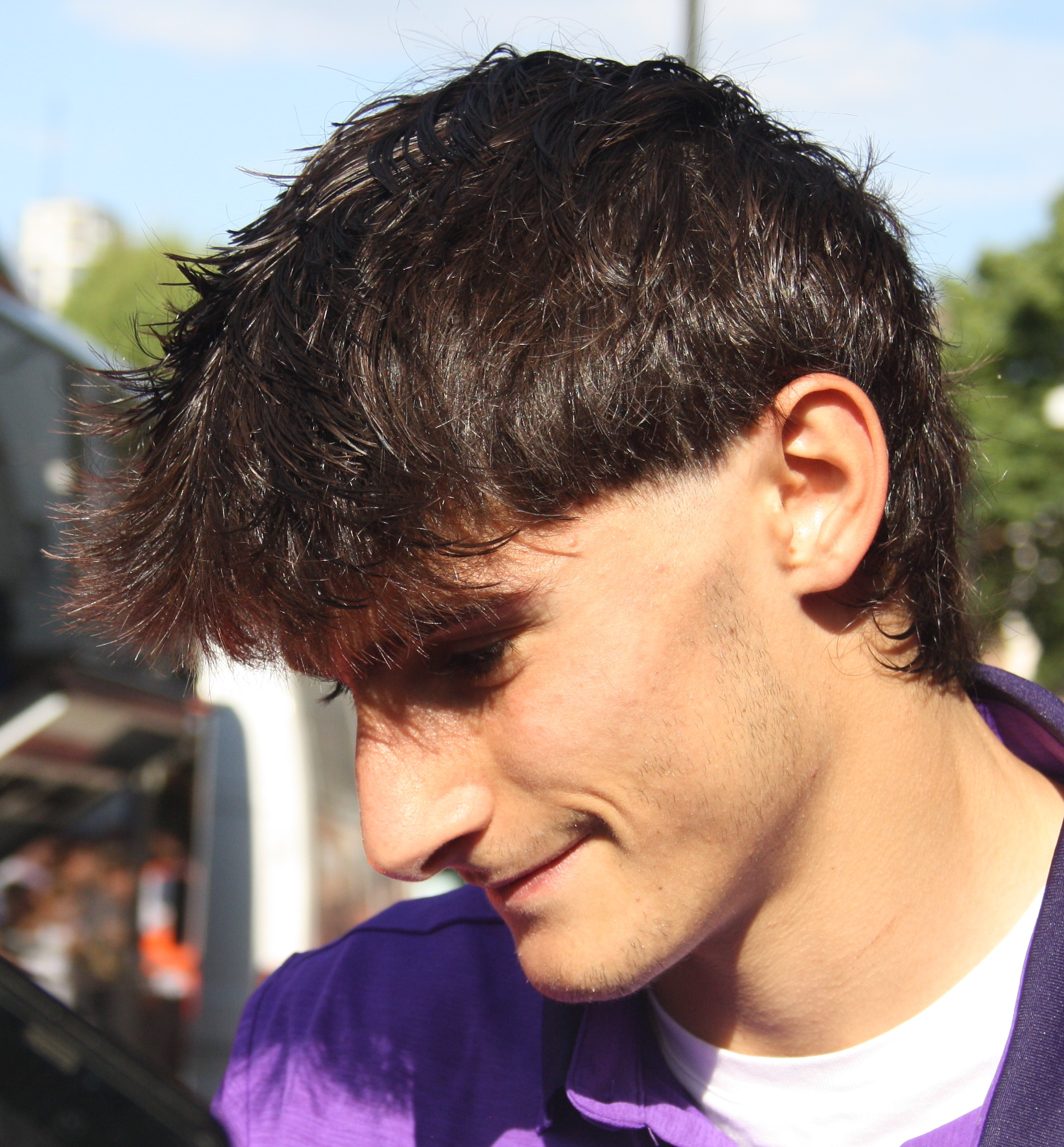
- Fortini with Fiorentina in 2026

Personal information
- Date of birth: 13 February 2006 (age 20)
- Place of birth: Lucca, Italy
- Height: 1.85 m (6 ft 1 in)
- Positions: Full-back; wing-back

Team information
- Current team: Torino (on loan from Fiorentina)
- Number: 29

Youth career
- –2023: Fiorentina

Senior career*
Years	Team	Apps	(Gls)
2024–	Fiorentina	16	(0)
2024–2025	→ Juve Stabia (loan)	26	(2)
2026–	→ Torino (loan)	1	(0)

International career^{‡}
2024	Italy U18	3	(0)
2024–2025	Italy U19	12	(1)
2025–	Italy U21	3	(0)
2026–	Italy	1	(0)
- * Club domestic league appearances and goals as of 23 August 2026 ‡ National team caps and goals as of 1 October 2026

Niccolò Fortini (born 13 February 2006) is an Italian professional footballer who plays as a full-back or wing-back for Serie A club Torino, on loan from Fiorentina, and the Italy national team.

== Club career ==
Fortini is a youth product of Fiorentina, with whom he started his senior career.

On 30 August 2024, Fortini joined Serie B side Juve Stabia on loan.

On 21 August 2026, he was loaned to Torino for the 2026–27 season, with an option to buy.

== International career ==
Fortini was one of the players who were called up with the Italy national senior squad by interim head coach Silvio Baldini, for the friendly matches against Luxembourg and Greece on 3 and 7 June 2026, respectively.

== Career statistics ==
=== Club ===
As of match played 12 March 2026

Appearances and goals by club, season and competition
Club	Season	League			Coppa Italia		Europe		Other		Total	
Club	Season	Division	Apps	Goals	Apps	Goals	Apps	Goals	Apps	Goals	Apps	Goals
Fiorentina	2023–24	Serie A	0	0	0	0	0	0	—		0	0
Fiorentina	2024–25	Serie A	0	0	0	0	0	0	—		0	0
Fiorentina	2025–26	Serie A	16	0	1	0	9 (Note: Appearances in UEFA Conference League)	0	—		26	0
Fiorentina	Total		16	0	1	0	9	0	—		26	0
Juve Stabia (loan)	2024–25	Serie B	26	2	—		—		1 (Note: Appearance in Serie B promotion play-offs)	0	27	2
Career total			42	2	1	0	9	0	1	0	53	2

=== International ===
As of match played 3 June 2026

Appearances and goals by national team and year
National team	Year	Apps	Goals
Italy	2026	1	0
Total		1	0
