= Cher Ndour =

Italian footballer (born 2004)

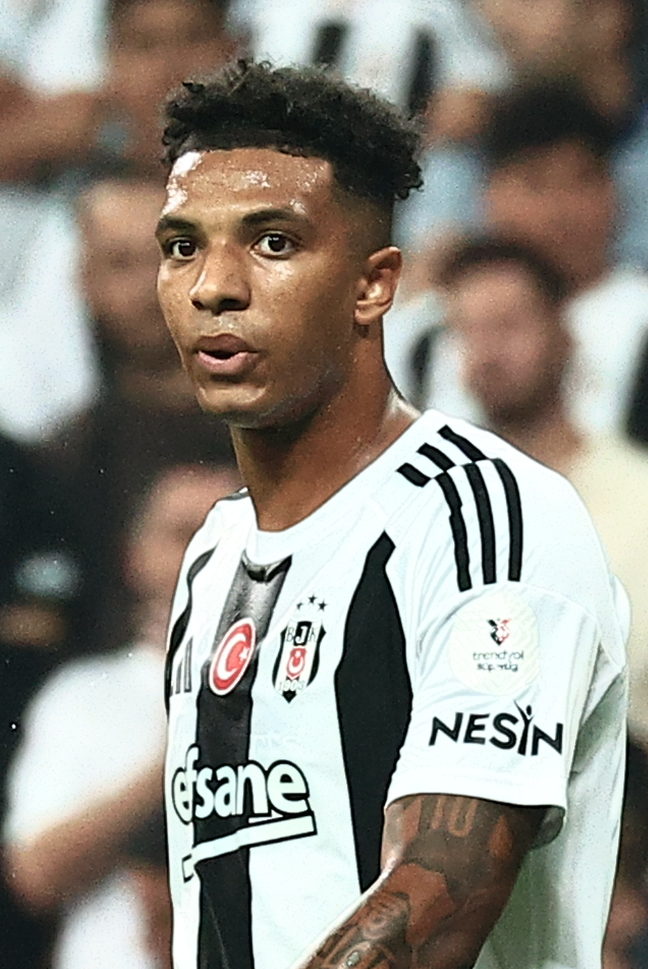
- Ndour with Beşiktaş in 2024

Personal information
- Date of birth: 27 July 2004 (age 22)
- Place of birth: Brescia, Italy
- Height: 1.90 m (6 ft 3 in)
- Position: Midfielder

Team information
- Current team: Fiorentina
- Number: 27

Youth career
- 2005–2009: ASD San Giacomo
- 2009–2013: Brescia
- 2013–2020: Atalanta
- 2020–2023: Benfica

Senior career*
Years	Team	Apps	(Gls)
2021–2023	Benfica B	57	(5)
2023	Benfica	1	(0)
2023–2025	Paris Saint-Germain	3	(0)
2024	→ Braga (loan)	9	(1)
2024–2025	→ Beşiktaş (loan)	12	(1)
2025–	Fiorentina	49	(3)

International career^{‡}
2019	Italy U15	9	(1)
2019–2020	Italy U16	5	(0)
2020–2021	Italy U18	7	(0)
2023	Italy U19	4	(1)
2022–2023	Italy U20	7	(1)
2023–	Italy U21	28	(6)
2026–	Italy	2	(0)
Medal record
Men's football
Representing Italy
UEFA European Under-19 Championship
Winner	2023 Malta
- * Club domestic league appearances and goals as of 17:00, 18 October 2026 (UTC) ‡ National team caps and goals as of 5 October 2026

Cher Ndour (born 27 July 2004) is an Italian professional footballer who plays as a central midfielder for Serie A club Fiorentina and the Italy national team.

== Club career ==
=== Benfica ===
Born in Brescia, Lombardy, Ndour began his football training at the youth academy of ASD San Giacomo, before moving to the youth academy of Brescia, and later joining the youth academy of Atalanta at the age of 9. On 31 July 2020, he transferred to Portuguese club Benfica. He made his professional debut with Benfica B in a 2–0 Liga Portugal 2 win over Oliveirense on 2 May 2021, coming in as a sub in the 91st minute replacing Gonçalo Ramos. At 16 years and 279, Ndour is the youngest ever debutante for Benfica B, taking the record from João Félix.

On 18 March 2023, Ndour made his Primeira Liga debut for Benfica, coming on a substitute to Rafa Silva in the last minute of a 5–1 win over Vitória de Guimarães.

=== Paris Saint-Germain ===
On 12 July 2023, Ndour signed for Ligue 1 club Paris Saint-Germain on a five-year contract until 30 June 2028. He made his debut as a substitute in a 4–1 away win over Lyon on 3 September 2023, becoming the ninth Italian to play for the Parisians. On 7 January 2024, Ndour scored his first goal for PSG in a 9–0 victory away at Régional 1 side Revel, in the round of 64 of the Coupe de France.

==== Loan to Braga ====
On 29 January 2024, Ndour was loaned to Primeira Liga club Braga until the end of the season.

==== Loan to Beşiktaş ====
On 13 August 2024, Ndour was loaned to Süper Lig club Beşiktaş for the 2024–25 season.

=== Fiorentina ===
On 3 February 2025, Serie A club Fiorentina bought Ndour for €5 million plus a 50% sell-on clause. He signed a contract until June 2029.

== International career ==
Born in Italy to a Senegalese father and an Italian mother, Ndour is a youth international for Italy.

In June 2023, he was included in the Italian under-19 squad for the UEFA European Championship in Malta, where the Azzurrini eventually won their second continental title.

On 8 September 2023, he made his debut with the Italy U21 side, in the qualifying match against Latvia.

In June 2024, he took part in the Maurice Revello Tournament in France with Italy.

In May 2026, Ndour was one of the players who were called up with the Italy national senior squad by interim head coach Silvio Baldini, for the friendly matches against Luxembourg and Greece on 3 and 7 June 2026, respectively.

== Career statistics ==
=== Club ===
As of match played 18 October 2026

Appearances and goals by club, season and competition
Club	Season	League			National cup (Note: Includes Coupe de France, Turkish Cup, Coppa Italia)		League cup		Europe		Other		Total	
Club	Season	Division	Apps	Goals	Apps	Goals	Apps	Goals	Apps	Goals	Apps	Goals	Apps	Goals
Benfica B	2020–21	Liga Portugal 2	1	0	—		—		—		—		1	0
Benfica B	2021–22	Liga Portugal 2	26	1	—		—		—		—		26	1
Benfica B	2022–23	Liga Portugal 2	30	4	—		—		—		—		30	4
Benfica B	Total		57	5	—		—		—		—		57	5
Benfica	2022–23	Primeira Liga	1	0	0	0	0	0	0	0	—		1	0
Paris Saint-Germain	2023–24	Ligue 1	3	0	1	1	—		0	0	0	0	4	1
Braga (loan)	2023–24	Primeira Liga	9	1	—		—		2 (Note: Appearances in UEFA Europa League)	0	—		11	1
Beşiktaş (loan)	2024–25	Süper Lig	12	1	1	0	—		9	0	—		22	1
Fiorentina	2024–25	Serie A	9	0	—		—		0	0	—		9	0
Fiorentina	2025–26	Serie A	33	3	1	0	—		13 (Note: Appearances in UEFA Conference League)	4	—		47	7
Fiorentina	2026–27	Serie A	7	0	2	1	—		—		—		9	1
Fiorentina	Total		49	3	3	1	—		13	4	—		65	8
Career total			131	10	5	2	0	0	25	5	0	0	161	17

=== International ===
As of match played 7 June 2026

Appearances and goals by national team and year
National team	Year	Apps	Goals
Italy	2026	2	0
Total		2	0

== Honours ==
Benfica

- Primeira Liga: 2022–23
- Campeonato Nacional de Juniores: 2021–22
- UEFA Youth League: 2021–22
- Under-20 Intercontinental Cup: 2022

Paris Saint-Germain

- Ligue 1: 2023–24

Italy U19

- UEFA European Under-19 Championship: 2023
