= Riccardo Braschi =

Italian footballer (born 2006)

Personal information
- Date of birth: 24 August 2006 (age 20)
- Place of birth: Florence, Italy
- Height: 1.90 m (6 ft 3 in)
- Position: Forward

Team information
- Current team: Thun
- Number: 20

Youth career
- Fiorentina

Senior career*
Years	Team	Apps	(Gls)
2025–2026	Fiorentina	2	(0)
2026–	Thun	1	(0)

International career^{‡}
2022	Italy U16	5	(0)
2022	Italy U17	1	(0)
2024	Italy U18	1	(0)
- * Club domestic league appearances and goals as of 28 September 2026 ‡ National team caps and goals as of 13 February 2024

Riccardo Braschi (born 24 August 2006) is an Italian professional footballer who plays as a forward for Swiss Super League club Thun.

== Early life ==
Braschi was born on 10 November 2006 in Florence, Italy. Growing up, he regarded Argentina international Gabriel Batistuta as his football idol.

== Club career ==
As a youth player, Braschi joined the youth academy of Serie A side Fiorentina. Ahead of the 2025–26 season, he was promoted to the club's senior team. At the start of the following season, he joined Swiss Super League club Thun on a permanent basis.

== International career ==
Braschi is an Italy youth international. On 14 February 2024, he debuted for the Italy national under-18 football team during a 1–0 home friendly win over the Slovakia national under-18 football team.

== Style of play ==
Braschi plays as a forward. Right-footed, he has received comparisons to Uruguay international Edinson Cavani.

== Career statistics ==
As of match played 10 May 2026

Appearances and goals by club, season and competition
Club	Season	League			Coppa Italia		Europe		Total	
Club	Season	Division	Apps	Goals	Apps	Goals	Apps	Goals	Apps	Goals
Fiorentina	2025–26	Serie A	2	0	0	0	1 (Note: Appearance in UEFA Conference League)	0	3	0
Career total			2	0	0	0	1	0	3	0
