= Tommaso Rubino =

Italian footballer (born 2006)

Personal information
- Date of birth: 10 November 2006 (age 20)
- Place of birth: Florence, Italy
- Height: 1.79 m (5 ft 10 in)
- Position: Forward

Team information
- Current team: Carrarese (on loan from Fiorentina)
- Number: 10

Youth career
- Fiorentina

Senior career*
Years	Team	Apps	(Gls)
2024–	Fiorentina	1	(0)
2025–	→ Carrarese (loan)	26	(2)

International career^{‡}
2025–	Italy U19	1	(0)
- * Club domestic league appearances and goals as of 13 May 2026 ‡ National team caps and goals as of 15 January 2025

Tommaso Rubino (born 10 November 2006) is an Italian professional footballer who plays as a forward for Serie B club Carrarese, on loan from Fiorentina.

== Early life ==
Rubino was born on 10 November 2006 in Florence, Italy and is a native of the city. The son of Italian footballer Raffaele Rubino, he is the nephew of Italian footballer Emiliano Bigica.

Growing up, he regarded Argentina international Lionel Messi as his football idol and supported Serie A side Fiorentina.

== Club career ==
As a youth player, Rubino joined the youth academy of Serie A side Fiorentina. During the 2023–24 season, Italian news website MondoPrimavera wrote that he "proved to be a key player, scoring ten goals in thirty games for the Under-20s".

In 2024, he was promoted to the club's senior team. On 31 October 2024, he debuted for them during a 1–0 away win over Genoa in the league.

On 15 July 2025, Rubino moved on a season-long loan to Carrarese in Serie B.

== Style of play ==
Rubino plays as a forward. Right-footed, he has received comparisons to Italy international Federico Chiesa.
