= Matías Moreno (footballer) =

Argentine footballer (born 2003)

Personal information
- Full name: Matías Agustín Moreno
- Date of birth: 24 September 2003 (age 23)
- Place of birth: Córdoba, Argentina
- Height: 1.93 m (6 ft 4 in)
- Position: Centre-back

Team information
- Current team: Venezia (on loan from Fiorentina)
- Number: 2

Youth career
- Belgrano

Senior career*
Years	Team	Apps	(Gls)
2023–2024	Belgrano	29	(0)
2024–	Fiorentina	4	(0)
2025–2026	→ Levante (loan)	28	(0)
2026–	→ Venezia (loan)	0	(0)
- * Club domestic league appearances and goals as of 20:00, 23 May 2026 (UTC)

Matías Agustín Moreno (born 24 September 2003) is an Argentine professional footballer who plays as a centre-back for Serie A club Venezia, on loan from Fiorentina.

== Career ==
Moreno started his career at Belgrano, making his first-team debut for them in the Argentine Primera División on 10 July 2023. He played 75 minutes in a 0–0 draw with Colón. He was signed by Fiorentina for €5 million on 30 August 2024, after the club sold Serbian central defender Nikola Milenković to Premier League club Nottingham Forest.

On 11 July 2025, Moreno was loaned to La Liga club Levante for one year. On 30 July 2026, he joined Venezia on loan for the 2026–27 season, with an option for the club to make the move permanent if certain conditions are met.

== Career statistics ==
As of match played 23 May 2026

Appearances and goals by club, season and competition
Club	Season	League			National cup		Continental		Other		Total	
Club	Season	Division	Apps	Goals	Apps	Goals	Apps	Goals	Apps	Goals	Apps	Goals
Belgrano	2023	Argentine Primera División	10	0	0	0	—		—		10	0
Belgrano	2024	Argentine Primera División	19	0	1	0	6 (Note: Appearances in Copa Sudamericana)	0	—		26	0
Belgrano	Total		29	0	1	0	6	0	—		36	0
Fiorentina	2024–25	Serie A	4	0	0	0	8 (Note: Appearances in UEFA Conference League)	0	—		12	0
Levante (loan)	2025–26	La Liga	28	0	1	0	—		—		29	0
Career total			61	0	2	0	14	0	0	0	77	0
