= Maat Daniel Caprini =

Italian footballer (born 2006)

Personal information
- Date of birth: 11 February 2006 (age 20)
- Place of birth: Milan, Italy
- Height: 1.80 m (5 ft 11 in)
- Position: Forward

Team information
- Current team: Cesena (on loan from Fiorentina)
- Number: 11

Youth career
- –2017: AC Milan
- 2018–2020: Novara
- 2020–2022: Virtus Entella
- 2022–: Fiorentina

Senior career*
Years	Team	Apps	(Gls)
2024–	Fiorentina	2	(0)
2025–2026	→ Mantova (loan)	16	(0)
2026–	→ Cesena (loan)	0	(0)

International career^{‡}
2024	Italy U18	4	(2)
2024–2025	Italy U19	6	(1)
2025–	Italy U20	2	(1)
- * Club domestic league appearances and goals as of 13 May 2026 ‡ National team caps and goals as of 9 September 2025

Maat Daniel Caprini (born 11 February 2006) is an Italian professional footballer who plays as a forward for Serie B club Cesena, on loan from Fiorentina.

== Early life ==
Caprini was born on 11 February 2006 in Milan, Italy. The son of Daniele Caprini and Miranda Caprini, he obtained a Guinean and a French passport.

== Club career ==
As a youth player, Caprini joined the youth academy of Serie A side AC Milan. In 2018, he joined the youth academy of Italian side Novara. Two years later, he joined the youth academy of Italian side Virtus Entella. Ahead of the 2022–23 season, he joined the youth academy of Serie A side Fiorentina and was promoted to the club's senior team in 2024. On 6 February 2025, he made his professional debut for during a 3–0 home win over Inter Milan in the league.

On 14 July 2026, Caprini moved on his second Serie B loan, joining Cesena for a season with an option to buy.

== Style of play ==
Caprini plays as a forward and is right-footed. Italian news website Goal wrote in 2025 that he "is a fast and powerful striker who is good at both attacking spaces and in the air. With an excellent physique... versatility is one of his strong points. He can be deployed both as a first striker and as a winger in a trident, especially on the top left from where he can move inside to shoot with his right foot".
