= 2025–26 US Avellino 1912 season =

US Avellino 1912
2025–26 season
- Manager: Raffaele Biancolino (until 16 February); Davide Ballardini (from 18 February)
- Stadium: Stadio Partenio-Adriano Lombardi
- Serie B: 8th
- Coppa Italia: Preliminary round
- Top goalscorer: League: Raffaele Russo (2); All: Raffaele Russo (2)
- Highest home attendance: 9,600 vs Monza
- Biggest defeat: Frosinone 2–0 Avellino

The 2025–26 season was the 114th in the history of Unione Sportiva Avellino 1912 and the club's first season back in the second tier of Italian football since 2018. Avellino also took part in the Coppa Italia.

== Squad ==
=== Transfers In ===
Pos.	Player	Transferred from	Fee	Date	Source
DF	(Italy) Leo di Martino	(Italy) Civitanovese	Loan return	30 June 2025	
FW	(Suriname) Daishawn Redan	(Belgium) Beerschot	Loan return	30 June 2025	
DF	(Italy) Damiano Cancellieri	(Italy) Triestina	Loan return	30 June 2025	
FW	(Italy) Gabriele Gori	(Italy) Südtirol	Loan return	30 June 2025	
MF	(Italy) Marco Toscano	(Italy) Trapani	Loan return	30 June 2025	
DF	(Italy) Erasmo Mulè	(Italy) Trapani	Loan return	30 June 2025	
MF	(Italy) Daniel Sannipoli	(Italy) Cavese	Loan return	30 June 2025	
MF	(Norway) Martin Palumbo	(Italy) Juventus Next Gen	€1,000,000	1 July 2025	
DF	(Italy) Andrea Cagnano	(Italy) Südtirol	Undisclosed	1 July 2025	
FW	(Argentina) Facundo Lescano	(Italy) Trapani	€1,000,000	1 July 2025	
FW	(Italy) Giuseppe Panico	(Italy) Carrarese	Undisclosed	1 July 2025	
DF	(Venezuela) Alessandro Milani	(Italy) Lazio U20	Loan	3 July 2025	
FW	(Italy) Andrea Favilli	(Italy) Genoa	Undisclosed	3 July 2025	
MF	(Italy) Luca D'Andrea	(Italy) Sassoulo	Loan	8 July 2025	
MF	(Italy) Justin Kumi	(Italy) Sassoulo	Loan	8 July 2025	
FW	(Italy) Valerio Crespi	(Italy) Lazio	Undisclosed	9 July 2025	
MF	(Italy) Emmanuel Gyabuaa	(Italy) Atalanta U23	Loan	13 July 2025	
DF	(Croatia) Lorenco Šimić	(Israel) Maccabi Haifa	Undisclosed	14 July 2025	
MF	(Italy) Michele Besaggio	(Italy) Brescia	Free	18 July 2025	
MF	(Italy) Roberto Insigne	(Italy) Palermo	Undisclosed	23 July 2025	
DF	(Italy) Matteo Marchisano	(Italy) Napoli	Loan	23 July 2025	
FW	(Italy) Gennaro Tutino	(Italy) Sampdoria	Loan	8 August 2025	
DF	(Italy) Alessandro Fontanarosa	(Italy) Internazionale	Undisclosed	20 August 2025	
DF	(Italy) Filippo Missori	(Italy) Sassuolo	Loan	29 August 2025	
FW	(Italy) Tommaso Biasci	(Italy) Catanzaro	Undisclosed	1 September 2025	
FW	(Netherlands) Daishawn Redan	(Belgium) Lokeren	Loan return	13 December 2025	
DF	(Italy) Marco Sala	(Italy) Como	Undisclosed	2 January 2026	
DF	(Italy) Filippo Reale	(Italy) Roma	Loan	7 January 2026	
MF	(Germany) Noah Mutanda	(Italy) Dolomiti	Loan return	15 January 2026	
GK	(Italy) Jacopo Sassi	(Italy) Atalanta	Loan	22 January 2026	
DF	(Italy) Armando Izzo	(Italy) Monza	Undisclosed	23 January 2026	
FW	(Italy) Gabriele Gori	(Italy) Ascoli	Loan return	1 February 2026	
FW	(Italy) Luca Pandolfi	(Italy) Catanzaro	Undisclosed	2 February 2026	
FW	(Italy) Lorenzo Sgarbi	(Italy) Napoli	Loan	2 February 2026	
MF	(France) Andréa Le Borgne	(Italy) Como	Loan	2 February 2026	

=== Transfers Out ===
Pos.	Player	Transferred to	Fee	Date	Source
FW	(Poland) Jan Żuberek	(Italy) Inter U23	Loan return	30 June 2025	
DF	(Poland) Thiago Cionek	(Italy) Cavese	Released	1 July 2025	
GK	(Italy) Mattia Guarnieri		Released	1 July 2025	
MF	(Italy) Daniel Sannipoli	(Italy) Guidonia	Free	3 July 2025	
MF	(Italy) Francesco Maisto	(Italy) Potenza	Loan	11 July 2025	
MF	(Germany) Noah Mutanda	(Italy) Dolomiti Bellunesi	Loan	14 July 2025	
MF	(Italy) Salvatore Pezzella	(Italy) Casertana	Undisclosed	22 July 2025	
MF	(Italy) Francesco Pio D'Anna	(Italy) Vis Pesaro	Loan	22 July 2025	
MF	(Italy) Alessio Tribuzzi	(Italy) Vicenza	Loan	23 July 2025	
DF	(Italy) Erasmo Mulè	(Italy) Guidonia	Loan	6 August 2025	
MF	(Italy) Michele D'Ausilio	(Italy) Catania	Loan	10 August 2025	
MF	(Italy) Marco Toscano	(Italy) Casertana	Loan	30 August 2025	
DF	(Italy) Gianmarco Todisco	(Italy) Audace Cerignola	Loan	31 August 2025	
FW	(Italy) Gabriele Gori	(Italy) Ascoli	Loan	31 August 2025	
DF	(Italy) Leo di Martino	(Italy) Poggibonsi	Loan	1 September 2025	
MF	(Italy) Michele Rocca	(Italy) Lumezzane	Undisclosed	1 September 2025	
DF	(Italy) Paolo Frascatore	(Italy) Salernitana	Undisclosed	1 September 2025	
FW	(Suriname) Daishawn Redan	(Belgium) Lokeren	Loan	8 September 2025	
MF	(Italy) Sonny D'Angelo	(Italy) Latina	Free	2 January 2026	
MF	(Italy) Antonio De Cristofaro	(Italy) Latina	Loan	2 January 2026	
DF	(Italy) Matteo Marchisano	(Italy) Giugliano	Loan	2 January 2026	
FW	(Netherlands) Daishawn Redan	Released		7 January 2026	
FW	(Italy) Giuseppe Panico	(Italy) Ternana	Loan	10 January 2026	
DF	(Italy) Claudio Manzi	(Italy) Monopoli	Loan	12 January 2026	
FW	(Argentina) Facundo Lescano	(Italy) Salernitana	Loan	23 January 2026	
FW	(Italy) Valerio Crespi	(Italy) Union Brescia	Loan	23 January 2026	
FW	(Italy) Gabriele Gori	(Italy) Ascoli	€400,000	2 February 2026	
DF	(Italy) Andrea Cagnano	(Italy) Pescara	Loan	2 February 2026	
DF	(Italy) Michele Rigione	Released		2 February 2026	

== Exhibition matches ==
On June 23, the club announced its preseason preparations, which will commence with a training camp in Rivisondoli, in the Abruzzo region. The camp will include two friendly matches. Subsequently, the team will head to Frosinone to take part in the Sandro Criscitiello Memorial match against Lazio.

19 July 2025 Friendly	Avellino	25–0	Castel di Sangro	Rivisondoli
	Lescano 10; Favilli 4; Panico 3; Crespi 3; D’Andrea 2; Kumi 2; Armellino 1; Manzi 1; Milani 1; Palmiero 1			Stadium: Stadio Comunale Rivisondoli

22 July 2025 Friendly	Avellino	2–0	Napoli Primavera	Rivisondoli
16:30	Colella 25' (o.g.); Rigione 47'			Stadium: Stadio Comunale Rivisondoli

26 July 2025 Sandro Criscitiello memorial	Avellino	0–1	Lazio	Frosinone
20:30			Guendouzi 90+1' (pen.)	Stadium: Stadio Benito Stirpe

3 August 2025 Friendly	Avellino	3–1	Picerno	Montella
17:30				Stadium: stadio Guido Basile

== Competitions ==
=== Overall record ===
Competition	First match	Last match	Starting round	Record							
Competition	First match	Last match	Starting round	Pld	W	D	L	GF	GA	GD	Win %
Serie B	24 August 2025		Matchday 1	4	2	1	1	7	7	+0	50.00
Coppa Italia	10 August 2025		Preliminary round	1	0	0	1	0	1	−1	0.00
Total				5	2	1	2	7	8	−1	40.00

Last updated: 21 September 2025
Source: Competitions

=== Serie B ===
Pos	Team	Pld	W	D	L	GF	GA	GD	Pts	Promotion, qualification or relegation
6	Modena	38	15	10	13	49	36	+13	55	Qualification for promotion play-offs preliminary round
7	Juve Stabia	38	11	18	9	44	45	−1	51	Qualification for promotion play-offs preliminary round
8	Avellino	38	13	10	15	43	55	−12	49	Qualification for promotion play-offs preliminary round
9	Mantova	38	13	7	18	45	57	−12	46 (Note: Head-to-head points: Mantova 9, Padova 4, Cesena 4. Head-to-head goal difference: Padova −1, Cesena −3.)	
10	Padova	38	12	10	16	39	49	−10	46	

Source: Serie BKT
Rules for classification: 1) Points; 2) Head-to-head points; 3) Head-to-head goal difference; 4) Goal difference; 5) Goals scored; 6) Draw.
(Note: Head-to-head record is used only after all the matches between the teams in question have been played)

==== Results summary ====
Overall								Home						Away					
Pld	W	D	L	GF	GA	GD	Pts	W	D	L	GF	GA	GD	W	D	L	GF	GA	GD
38	13	10	15	43	55	−12	49	9	5	5	26	25	+1	4	5	10	17	30	−13

==== Results by round ====
Round	1	2	3	4
Ground	A	A	H	A
Result	L	D	W	W
Position	18	16	12	

Updated to match(es) played on 21 September 2025. Source:
A = Away; H = Home; W = Win; D = Draw; L = Loss

==== Matches ====
24 August 2025 1	Frosinone	2–0	Avellino	Frosinone
20:00 UTC+2	Koutsoupias 4'; Marchizza 28'; Monterisi (yellow card) 39'; Barcella (yellow card) 48'; Calvani (red card) 62'; Masciangelo (yellow card) 88'		Besaggio (yellow card) 35'; Kumi (yellow card) 72'	Stadium: Stadio Benito Stirpe; Attendance: 13,087; Referee: Federico Dionisi

31 August 2025 2	Modena	1–1	Avellino	Modena
20:00 UTC+2	Defrel (yellow card) 42', (goal) 63'; Magnino (yellow card) 90+3'		Cagnano (yellow card) 41' (red card) 74'; Sounas 54', (yellow card) 90'; Patierno (yellow card) 70'; Manzi (yellow card) 90+6'	Stadium: Stadio Alberto Braglia; Attendance: 11,112; Referee: Luca Massimi

12 September 2025 3	Avellino	2–1	Monza	Avellino
19:30 UTC+2	Šimić (yellow card) 22', (goal) 33'; Fontanarosa (yellow card) 59'; Russo 86'		Álvarez 90+2'	Stadium: Stadio Partenio-Adriano Lombardi; Attendance: 11,000; Referee: Ivano Pezzuto

21 September 2025 4	Carrarese	3–4	Avellino	Carrara
14:00 UTC+2	Abiuso 16'; Cicconi 25' (pen.); Bozhanaj (yellow card) 44'; Schiavi 81'		Šimić (yellow card) 1'; Crespi 18'; Enrici (yellow card) 22' (red card) 30'; Ruggeri 37' (o.g.); Russo 56'; Besaggio 67'; Fontanarosa (yellow card) 78'	Stadium: Stadio dei Marmi; Attendance: 3,443; Referee: Giuseppe Mucera

27 September 2025 5	Avellino	2–0	Virtus Entella	Avellino
14:00 UTC+2	Biasci 9'; Kumi 68'; Cagnano (yellow card) 90+2'		Benali (yellow card) 34'; Parodi (yellow card) 41'	Stadium: Stadio Partenio-Adriano Lombardi; Attendance: 10,134; Referee: Mario Perri

30 September 2025 6	Padova	2–2	Avellino	Padua
19:30 UTC+2	Sgarbi 9'; Buonaiuto 29'; Favale (yellow card) 54'; Di Maggio (yellow card) 85'		Biasci 31'; Lescano 44'; Russo (yellow card) 89'	Stadium: Stadio Euganeo; Attendance: 7,520; Referee: Antonio Rapuano

4 October 2025 7	Avellino	0–0	Mantova	Avellino
14:00 UTC+2	Palmiero (yellow card) 68'; Kumi (yellow card) 76'		Caprini (yellow card) 57'; Bani (yellow card) 72'; Artioli (yellow card) 88'	Stadium: Stadio Partenio-Adriano Lombardi; Attendance: 9,913; Referee: Claudio Giuseppe Allegretta

18 October 2025 8	Juve Stabia	2–0	Avellino	Castellammare di Stabia
16:15 UTC+2	Mosti 39'; Bellich 42'; Candellone (yellow card) 49'; Correia (yellow card) 68'		Cagnano (yellow card) 68'; Insigne (red card) 90+4'	Stadium: Stadio Romeo Menti; Attendance: 5,280; Referee: Giuseppe Mucera

25 October 2025 9	Avellino	0–4	Spezia	Avellino
15:00 UTC+2	Palmiero (red card) 44'; Besaggio (yellow card) 46'; Šimić (yellow card) 81'		Cassata (yellow card) 17'; Aurelio 63'; Vlahović 82'; Vignali 85'; Di Serio 90'	Stadium: Stadio Partenio-Adriano Lombardi; Attendance: 9,306; Referee: Daniele Perenzoni

28 October 2025 10	Pescara	1–1	Avellino	Pescara
20:30 UTC+2	Capellini 5'; Valzania (yellow card) 17'		Sounas (yellow card) 19'; Šimić 29'; Missori (yellow card) 41'; Tutino (yellow card) 90+4'	Stadium: Stadio Adriatico – Giovanni Cornacchia; Attendance: 7,987; Referee: Andrea Calzavara

1 November 2025 11	Avellino	4–3	Reggiana	Avellino
13:30 UTC+2	Biasci (yellow card) 25', (goal) 50'; Insigne 32' (pen.); Palmiero (yellow card) 47'; Milani (yellow card) 57'; Šimić 64'; Palumbo 70'; Missori (yellow card) 86'		Šimić 21' (o.g.); Novakovich 55', 62'; Portanova (yellow card) 67'; Gondo (yellow card) 90+3'	Stadium: Stadio Partenio-Adriano Lombardi; Attendance: 9,428; Referee: Luca Massimi

9 November 2025 12	Cesena	3–0	Avellino	Cesena
15:00 UTC+2	Ciervo 27', (yellow card) 83'; Francesconi (yellow card) 29'; Shpendi 45+5' (pen.); Blesa 51', (yellow card) 53'; Adamo (yellow card) 90+4'		Fontanarosa (yellow card) 35'; Rigione (yellow card) 45+3'; Patierno (yellow card) 45+8'; Sounas (yellow card) 61'	Stadium: Stadio Dino Manuzzi; Attendance: 13,225; Referee: Fabio Maresca

22 November 2025 13	Avellino	0–3	Empoli	Avellino
15:00 UTC+2	Cancellotti (yellow card) 30'; Fontanarosa (yellow card) 41'		Elia 17'; Innocenti (yellow card) 22'; Yepes (yellow card) 35'; Saporiti 45+2', (yellow card) 90+3'; Pellegri 90+5'	Stadium: Stadio Partenio-Adriano Lombardi; Attendance: 8,967; Referee: Francesco Fourneau

29 November 2025 14	Südtirol	0–1	Avellino	Bolzano
15:30 UTC+2	Tronchin (yellow card) 17'; Coulibaly (yellow card) 41'; Pecorino (yellow card) 67'; Merkaj (yellow card) 90+3'		Biasci 10'; Daffara (yellow card) 70'	Stadium: Stadio Druso; Attendance: 3,725; Referee: Antonio Rapuano

8 December 2025 15	Avellino	1–1	Venezia	Avellino
15:00 UTC+2	Missori 41'; Cancellotti (yellow card) 90+5'		Yeboah (yellow card) 23'; Svoboda 51'; Haps (yellow card) 90+5'	Stadium: Stadio Partenio-Adriano Lombardi; Attendance: 9,583; Referee: Kevin Bonacina

13 December 2025 16	Catanzaro	1–0	Avellino	Catanzaro
17:15 UTC+2	Petriccione (yellow card) 20'; Pittarello (yellow card) 27'; Cissè 52'; Rispoli (yellow card) 90+4'		Missori (yellow card) 26'; Besaggio (yellow card) 90+2'	Stadium: Stadio Nicola Ceravolo; Attendance: 9,264; Referee: Andrea Calzavara

20 December 2025 17	Avellino	2–2	Palermo	Avellino
17:15 UTC+2	Biasci 39'; Palmiero (yellow card) 56'; Šimić (yellow card) 61'; Palumbo (yellow card) 76', (goal) 89'; Fontanarosa (yellow card) 82'		Bani (yellow card) 18'; Ranocchia 69'; Diakité (yellow card) 75' (red card) 87'; Pohjanpalo 83' (pen.); Gomes (yellow card) 90+3'	Stadium: Stadio Partenio-Adriano Lombardi; Attendance: 9,585; Referee: Simone Galipò

27 December 2025 18	Bari	1–1	Avellino	Bari
19:30 UTC+2	Dickmann 52'; Braunöder (yellow card) 66'; Pucino (yellow card) 88'; Cerofolini (yellow card) 90+5'		Cancellotti (yellow card) 5'; Missori (yellow card) 50'; Biasci 68'; Patierno (yellow card) 90+5'	Stadium: Stadio San Nicola; Attendance: 11,265; Referee: Luca Zufferli

10 January 2026 19	Avellino	2–1	Sampdoria	Avellino
15:00 UTC+2	Palumbo 31', (yellow card) 90+6'; Fontanarosa (yellow card) 44'; Tutino 51'; Patierno (yellow card) 90'		Conti (yellow card) 22'; Barák (yellow card) 53'; Ioannou (yellow card) 77'; Coda 85' (pen.)	Stadium: Stadio Partenio-Adriano Lombardi; Attendance: 8,500; Referee: Valerio Crezzini

17 January 2026 20	Avellino	1–2	Carrarese	Avellino
15:00 UTC+2	Biasci 2'; Sounas (yellow card) 73'		Rubino 13', (yellow card) 23'; Oliana (yellow card) 48'; Abiuso 71'	Stadium: Stadio Partenio-Adriano Lombardi; Attendance: 9,264; Referee: Andrea Zanotti

24 January 2026 21	Spezia	1–0	Avellino	La Spezia
19:30 UTC+2	Matějů (yellow card) 2'; Artistico 26'; Romano (yellow card) 32'; Cassata (yellow card) 64'		Šimić (yellow card) 8'; Fontanarosa (yellow card) 36'; Palumbo (yellow card) 56'; Sala (yellow card) 89'	Stadium: Stadio Alberto Picco; Attendance: 8,712; Referee: Paride Tremolada

31 January 2026 22	Avellino	3–1	Cesena	Avellino
15:00 UTC+2	Biasci 17', 37', 62'; Enrici (yellow card) 77'		Olivieri 8'; Frabotta (yellow card) 33'; Piacentini (yellow card) 37'	Stadium: Stadio Partenio-Adriano Lombardi; Attendance: 7,839; Referee: Davide Di Marco

8 February 2026 23	Monza	2–1	Avellino	Monza
19:30 UTC+2	Cutrone 78'; Pessina 86' (pen.)		Enrici (yellow card) 34'; Biasci 52'; Le Borgne (yellow card) 79'; Missori (yellow card) 90+5'	Stadium: Stadio Brianteo; Attendance: 8,042; Referee: Livio Marinelli

11 February 2026 24	Avellino	1–3	Frosinone	Avellino
20:00 UTC+2	Palmiero (yellow card) 33'; Palumbo (yellow card) 69'; Enrici 77'		Kvernadze 16'; Calò 26'; Koutsoupias (yellow card) 47'; Cichella 61'	Stadium: Stadio Partenio-Adriano Lombardi; Attendance: 9,551; Referee: Alberto Arena

15 February 2026 25	Avellino	0–1	Pescara	Avellino
19:30 UTC+2	Cancellotti (yellow card) 6'; Biasci (yellow card) 36'; Missori (yellow card) 38'; Le Borgne (yellow card) 45+4'		Cagnano (yellow card) 11'; Olzer (yellow card) 72'; Brugman (yellow card) 73', (goal) 85'; Gravillon (yellow card) 90+2'	Stadium: Stadio Partenio-Adriano Lombardi; Attendance: 9,223; Referee: Andrea Calzavara

22 February 2026 26	Reggiana	1–1	Avellino	Reggio Emilia
17:15 UTC+2	Portanova 5', (yellow card) 22'; Charlys (yellow card) 50'		Enrici 29'; Sounas (yellow card) 32'	Stadium: Mapei Stadium; Attendance: 10,102; Referee: Paride Tremolada

28 February 2026 27	Avellino	0–0	Juve Stabia	Avellino
19:30 UTC+2	Šimić (yellow card) 60'; Besaggio (yellow card) 75'; Palmiero (yellow card) 78'		Correia (yellow card) 73'	Stadium: Stadio Partenio-Adriano Lombardi; Attendance: 9,500; Referee: Maria Sole Ferrieri Caputi

3 March 2026 28	Venezia	4–0	Avellino	Venice
20:00 UTC+2	Franjić (yellow card) 25'; Dagasso 38', 90+1'; Reale 40' (o.g.); Busio 44'		Tutino (red card) 34'; Le Borgne (yellow card) 63' (yellow-red card) 85'	Stadium: Stadio Pierluigi Penzo; Attendance: 7,874; Referee: Giuseppe Mucera

7 March 2026 29	Avellino	1–0	Padova	Avellino
15:00 UTC+2	Izzo (yellow card) 25'; Patierno (yellow card) 45+3'; Palmiero (yellow card) 49'; Russo 90+2'		Villa (yellow card) 54'; Di Maggio (yellow card) 64'; Pastina (yellow card) 78'	Stadium: Stadio Partenio-Adriano Lombardi; Attendance: 9,000; Referee: Daniele Perenzoni

15 March 2026 30	Virtus Entella	1–2	Avellino	Chiavari
15:00 UTC+2	Parodi (yellow card) 43'; Tiritiello 90+3'		Sala (yellow card) 6'; Russo 22'; Cancellotti 25'	Stadium: Stadio Comunale di Chiavari; Attendance: 2,828; Referee: Mario Perri

18 March 2026 31	Avellino	3–2	Südtirol	Avellino
20:00 UTC+2	Patierno 24', (yellow card) 56'; Cancellotti (yellow card) 46'; Izzo (yellow card) 47', (goal) 80'; Šimić (yellow card) 52'; Palmiero (yellow card) 58'; Besaggio 72'		Bordon (yellow card) 1'; Adamonis (yellow card) 32'; El Kaouakibi (yellow card) 47'; Casiraghi 52' (pen.); Pecorino (yellow card) 62', (goal) 75'; Veseli (yellow card) 80'; Tronchin (yellow card) 90+5'	Stadium: Stadio Partenio-Adriano Lombardi; Attendance: 9,165; Referee: Simone Galipo

22 March 2026 32	Sampdoria	2–1	Avellino	Genoa
17:15 UTC+2	Brunori (yellow card) 32', (goal) 72'; Pafundi (yellow card) 45'; Palma 80'; Giordano (yellow card) 90+3'		Pandolfi (yellow card) 26'; Palmiero (yellow card) 42'; Sounas (yellow card) 64'; Biasci 84'; Russo (yellow card) 88'	Stadium: Stadio Luigi Ferraris; Attendance: 25,105; Referee: Daniele Chiffi

5 April 2026 33	Palermo	2–0	Avellino	Palermo
19:30 UTC+2	Palumbo 12'; Pierozzi (yellow card) 37'; Gyasi (yellow card) 66'; Ranocchia 82'		Izzo (yellow card) 37' (yellow-red card); Šimić (yellow card) 45+2'	Stadium: Stadio Renzo Barbera; Attendance: 27,783; Referee: Valerio Crezzini

11 April 2026 34	Avellino	1–1	Catanzaro	Avellino
17:15 UTC+2	Russo (yellow card) 10'; Sounas (yellow card) 29'; Cancellotti (yellow card) 40'; Favilli (penalty missed) 76'; Iannarilli 90+5', (yellow card) 90+6'		Petriccione (yellow card) 4'; Brighenti (yellow card) 56' (yellow-red card) 75'; Iemmello 60'; Pontisso (yellow card) 66'; Di Francesco (yellow card) 72'	Stadium: Stadio Partenio-Adriano Lombardi; Attendance: 9,500; Referee: Paride Tremolada

18 April 2026 35	Mantova	0–2	Avellino	Mantua
15:00 UTC+2	Dembélé (yellow card) 90+3'		Missori 63'; Favilli 86'	Stadium: Stadio Danilo Martelli; Attendance: 9,684; Referee: Andrea Calzavara

24 April 2026 36	Avellino	2–0	Bari	Avellino
21:00 UTC+2	Patierno (yellow card) 11'; Besaggio 67'; Palmiero (yellow card) 72'; Palumbo 79'		Mane (yellow card) 28'; Artioli (yellow card) 81'	Stadium: Stadio Partenio-Adriano Lombardi; Attendance: 11,867; Referee: Gianluca Manganiello

1 May 2026 37	Empoli	1–0	Avellino	Empoli
15:00 UTC+2	Haas (yellow card) 46'; Lovato 58'; Shpendi (penalty missed) 72'; Elia (yellow card) 77'; Yepes (yellow card) 83'		Sounas (yellow card) 57'; Fontanarosa (red card) 90+7'	Stadium: Stadio Carlo Castellani; Attendance: 10,503; Referee: Federico La Penna

8 May 2026 38	Avellino	1–0	Modena	Avellino
20:30 UTC+2	Bagheria 44' (o.g.); Izzo (yellow card) 49'		Pyyhtiä (yellow card) 13'	Stadium: Stadio Partenio-Adriano Lombardi; Attendance: 9,700; Referee: Davide Di Marco

==== Play-offs ====
12 May 2026 Preliminary round	Catanzaro	3–0	Avellino	Catanzaro
22:00 UTC+2	Pontisso 41'; Cassandro 83'; Iemmello 90+3' (pen.)		Cancellotti (yellow card) 15'	Stadium: Stadio Nicola Ceravolo; Attendance: 10,210; Referee: Livio Marinelli

=== Coppa Italia ===
10 August 2025 Preliminary round	Audace Cerignola	1–0	Avellino	Cerignola
20:30	Cuppone 61'			Stadium: Stadio Domenico Monterisi; Attendance: 2,532; Referee: Gabriele Sacchi

== Appearances and goals ==
=== Appearances and goals ===
As of match played 12 May 2026

Players with no appearances are not included on the list
Italics indicate a loaned in player

No.	Pos	Nat	Player	Total		Serie B		Serie B promotion play-offs		Coppa Italia	
No.	Pos	Nat	Player	Apps	Goals	Apps	Goals	Apps	Goals	Apps	Goals
1	GK	(Italy) ITA	Antony Iannarilli	15	1	13+0	1	1+0	0	1+0	0
2	DF	(Italy) ITA	Filippo Missori	32	2	27+4	2	1+0	0	0+0	0
3	DF	(Italy) ITA	Marco Sala	13	0	13+0	0	0+0	0	0+0	0
4	DF	(Italy) ITA	Armando Izzo	10	1	9+0	1	1+0	0	0+0	0
6	MF	(Italy) ITA	Luca Palmiero	33	0	31+1	0	1+0	0	0+0	0
7	FW	(Italy) ITA	Gennaro Tutino	24	1	12+12	1	0+0	0	0+0	0
8	FW	(Italy) ITA	Luca Pandolfi	6	0	1+4	0	0+1	0	0+0	0
9	FW	(Italy) ITA	Cosimo Patierno	24	1	11+12	1	1+0	0	0+0	0
10	FW	(Italy) ITA	Raffaele Russo	36	4	9+25	4	1+0	0	1+0	0
11	FW	(Italy) ITA	Luca D'Andrea	5	0	0+4	0	0+1	0	0+0	0
14	FW	(Italy) ITA	Tommaso Biasci	35	11	30+4	11	0+1	0	0+0	0
16	MF	(Italy) ITA	Justin Kumi	20	1	10+9	1	0+0	0	1+0	0
18	FW	(Italy) ITA	Lorenzo Sgarbi	3	0	2+1	0	0+0	0	0+0	0
19	DF	(Italy) ITA	Filippo Reale	2	0	2+0	0	0+0	0	0+0	0
20	MF	(Norway) NOR	Martin Palumbo	37	4	25+10	4	1+0	0	1+0	0
21	MF	(Italy) ITA	Marco Armellino	6	0	0+6	0	0+0	0	0+0	0
24	MF	(Greece) GRE	Dimitrios Sounas	35	1	28+5	1	1+0	0	1+0	0
27	MF	(France) FRA	Andréa Le Borgne	12	0	2+9	0	0+1	0	0+0	0
29	DF	(Italy) ITA	Tommaso Cancellotti	35	1	29+4	1	1+0	0	1+0	0
30	GK	(Italy) ITA	Giovanni Daffara	25	0	25+0	0	0+0	0	0+0	0
39	MF	(Italy) ITA	Michele Besaggio	38	3	23+13	3	1+0	0	0+1	0
44	DF	(Croatia) CRO	Lorenco Šimić	35	3	33+1	3	0+0	0	0+1	0
56	DF	(Italy) ITA	Patrick Enrici	30	2	22+6	2	1+0	0	1+0	0
63	DF	(Italy) ITA	Alessandro Fontanarosa	25	0	23+2	0	0+0	0	0+0	0
78	DF	(Venezuela) VEN	Alessandro Milani	15	0	5+9	0	0+0	0	1+0	0
94	FW	(Italy) ITA	Roberto Insigne	23	1	12+9	1	0+1	0	0+1	0
99	FW	(Italy) ITA	Andrea Favilli	6	1	0+6	1	0+0	0	0+0	0
Player(s) who featured whilst on loan but returned to parent club during the season:
8	MF	(Italy) ITA	Emmanuel Gyabuaa	5	0	0+5	0	0+0	0	0+0	0
Player(s) who featured but departed the club permanently during the season:
5	DF	(Italy) ITA	Michele Rigione	1	0	0+1	0	0+0	0	0+0	0
Player(s) who featured but departed the club on loan during the season:
2	DF	(Italy) ITA	Gianmarco Todisco	1	0	0+0	0	0+0	0	0+1	0
17	FW	(Italy) ITA	Valerio Crespi	15	1	7+7	1	0+0	0	1+0	0
23	DF	(Italy) ITA	Andrea Cagnano	8	0	7+1	0	0+0	0	0+0	0
32	FW	(Argentina) ARG	Facundo Lescano	12	1	5+6	1	0+0	0	1+0	0
33	FW	(Italy) ITA	Giuseppe Panico	3	0	0+2	0	0+0	0	0+1	0
79	DF	(Italy) ITA	Claudio Manzi	4	0	2+1	0	0+0	0	1+0	0
