= List of Italian football transfers summer 2026 =

The 2026 Italian football summer transfer window ran from 1 July to 1 September 2026 (20:00). This list includes transfers featuring at least one club from either Serie A or Serie B that were completed after the end of the 2025–26 season and before the end of the summer 2026 window on 1 September 2026. All transfers needed to be approved and registered by the Lega Serie A and Lega B respectively.

== Transfers ==
All players and clubs without a flag are Italian.

Legend

- Those clubs in Italic indicate that the player already left the team on loan on this or the previous season or a new signing that immediately left the club.

Date	Name	Moving from	Moving to	Fee
12 February 2026	(Spain) Álex Jiménez	Milan	(England) Bournemouth	Undisclosed (Note: The player already played for his new club in the 2025–26 season, the deal turned from temporary to definitive.)
18 February 2026	Tommaso Pobega	Milan	Bologna	Undisclosed
19 May 2026	Davide Biraschi	Frosinone	(Turkey) Fatih Karagümrük	Undisclosed
21 May 2026	Lorenzo Colombo	Milan	Genoa	Undisclosed
26 May 2026	(Netherlands) Donyell Malen	(England) Aston Villa	Roma	Undisclosed
26 May 2026	Filippo Liberati	Caldiero Terme	Carrarese	Undisclosed
27 May 2026	(Croatia) Toma Bašić	Lazio	Venezia	Free
1 June 2026	Issa Doumbia	Venezia	(Portugal) Sporting	Undisclosed
1 June 2026	(Kosovo) Arijanet Muric	(England) Ipswich Town	Sassuolo	Undisclosed
3 June 2026	(Spain) Buba Sangaré	Roma	(Spain) Elche	Undisclosed
3 June 2026	(Denmark) Rasmus Højlund	(England) Man United	Napoli	Undisclosed
4 June 2026	(Saudi Arabia) Saud Abdulhamid	Roma	(France) Lens	Undisclosed
4 June 2026	(France) Manga Foe Ondoa	(Portugal) Estoril	Monza	Undisclosed
5 June 2026	(Serbia) Aleksandar Stanković	(Belgium) Club Brugge	Inter	Undisclosed
5 June 2026	(Brazil) Alisson Santos	(Portugal) Sporting	Napoli	Undisclosed
10 June 2026	(Uruguay) Joaquín Sosa	Bologna	(Chile) Colo-Colo	Loan
11 June 2026	(Serbia) Stefan Mitrović	Verona	(Serbia) Vojvodina	Loan
12 June 2026	(Guinea-Bissau) Marcelo Vaz	Varesina	Genoa	Undisclosed
12 June 2026	(Bulgaria) Adrian Raychev	Pisa	(Bulgaria) Levski Sofia	Loan
15 June 2026	Nicolò Zaniolo	(Turkey) Galatasaray	Udinese	Undisclosed
15 June 2026	(Ivory Coast) Jérémie Boga	(France) Nice	Juventus	€4.8M
15 June 2026	(Lithuania) Adrian Lickūnas	Perugia	Cremonese	Undisclosed
16 June 2026	(Slovenia) Tjaš Begić	Parma	Sampdoria	Undisclosed
16 June 2026	Valerio Crespi	Avellino	Union Brescia	Undisclosed
17 June 2026	(Brazil) Ruan Tressoldi	Sassuolo	(Brazil) Atlético Mineiro	Undisclosed
17 June 2026	(Poland) Sebastian Walukiewicz	Torino	Sassuolo	Undisclosed
17 June 2026	Giacomo Calò	Cesena	Frosinone	Undisclosed
18 June 2026	Tommaso Corazza	Bologna	Vicenza	Loan
18 June 2026	(France) Fahem Benaïssa-Yahia	(Portugal) Casa Pia	Mantova	Undisclosed
19 June 2026	(Romania) Răzvan Sava	Udinese	(Romania) Craiova	Undisclosed
19 June 2026	(Chile) Thomas Gillier	Bologna	(Canada) Montréal	6-month loan
19 June 2026	Giacomo Faticanti	Lecce	Juve Next Gen	Undisclosed
19 June 2026	(Brazil) Jonathan Silva	Torino	Mantova	Loan
21 June 2026	Alessandro Nunziante	Udinese	Arezzo	Loan
22 June 2026	(Montenegro) Bodin Tomasevic	Bologna	Mantova	Loan
24 June 2026	(Switzerland) Leorat Bega	(Switzerland) Stade Nyonnais	Verona	Free
24 June 2026	(Morocco) Yanis Khafi	(France) PSG	Carrarese	Free
24 June 2026	Luca Gemello	Perugia	Mantova	Undisclosed
25 June 2026	(France) Joris Manquant	(Switzerland) Stade Nyonnais	Modena	Free
25 June 2026	Marco Silvestri	Cremonese	(Turkey) Fatih Karagümrük	Undisclosed
25 June 2026	(Denmark) Alexander Lind	Pisa	(Denmark) Nordsjælland	Undisclosed
26 June 2026	Simone Lontani	Milan	Parma	Free
26 June 2026	Tommaso Berti	Cesena	Cremonese	Undisclosed
26 June 2026	(Senegal) Demba Seck	Torino	(Serbia) Partizan	Undisclosed
27 June 2026	(United States) Benjamin Cremaschi	(United States) Inter Miami	Parma	Undisclosed
27 June 2026	Iacopo Lipani	Virtus Entella	Latina	Undisclosed
27 June 2026	(Poland) Kornel Lisman	(Poland) Lech Poznań	Venezia	Undisclosed
28 June 2026	Alessandro Sersanti	Juve Next Gen	Modena	Undisclosed
29 June 2026	(England) Ben Godfrey	Atalanta	(Scotland) Rangers	Loan
29 June 2026	Diego Ronco	Monopoli	Modena	Undisclosed
29 June 2026	Emanuele Schimmenti	Monopoli	Benevento	Undisclosed
29 June 2026	Lorenzo Berardi	Pescara	Venezia	Undisclosed
29 June 2026	(Germany) Armel Bella-Kotchap	Verona	Venezia	Undisclosed
29 June 2026	(France) Mathis Lambourde	Verona	(Switzerland) Servette	Undisclosed
30 June 2026	(Portugal) Gonçalo Ramos	(France) PSG	Milan	Undisclosed
30 June 2026	(Argentina) Nahuel Estévez	Parma	Palermo	Free
30 June 2026	Manuel Ricciardi	Cosenza	Juve Stabia	Undisclosed
30 June 2026	Lorenzo Carissoni	Cittadella	Juve Stabia	Undisclosed
30 June 2026	Andrea Giorgini	Südtirol	Juve Stabia	Undisclosed
30 June 2026	Nicola Bagnolini	Bologna	Gubbio	Loan
30 June 2026	(Switzerland) Ethan Meichtry	(Switzerland) Thun	Genoa	Undisclosed
1 July 2026	Jeff Ekhator	Genoa	Juventus	€16,4M
1 July 2026	Giovanni Daffara	Juventus	Parma	Undisclosed
1 July 2026	(Latvia) Dario Šits	Parma	(Netherlands) Dordrecht	Loan
1 July 2026	(Brazil) Viery	(Brazil) Grêmio	Fiorentina	Undisclosed
1 July 2026	Alessandro Sorrentino	Monza	Padova	Undisclosed
1 July 2026	(Iceland) Þórir Jóhann Helgason	Lecce	Venezia	Undisclosed
1 July 2026	Alessandro Romano	Roma	Cagliari	Undisclosed
1 July 2026	Marco Palestra	Atalanta	(England) Chelsea	Undisclosed
1 July 2026	Luigi Caccavo	Lumezzane	Bologna	Undisclosed
1 July 2026	Ettore Gliozzi	Modena	Mantova	Free
1 July 2026	Daniele Montevago	Perugia	Modena	Undisclosed
1 July 2026	Luca Bacchin	Perugia	Modena	Undisclosed
1 July 2026	(Switzerland) Stefan Gartenmann	(Hungary) Ferencváros	Sampdoria	Undisclosed
1 July 2026	Andrea Seculin	Reggiana	Arezzo	Free
2 July 2026	(Spain) Luis Milla	(Spain) Getafe	Como	Undisclosed
2 July 2026	(Brazil) Kaiki Bruno	(Brazil) Cruzeiro	Como	Loan
2 July 2026	(Argentina) Lucas Beltrán	Fiorentina	(Argentina) River Plate	Loan
2 July 2026	(Austria) David Puczka	Juve Next Gen	Genoa	Undisclosed
2 July 2026	Samuel Wiafe	Modena	Genoa	Undisclosed
2 July 2026	Leonardo Consiglio	Genoa	Modena	Undisclosed
2 July 2026	Martino Odero	Genoa	Modena	Undisclosed
2 July 2026	(Portugal) Thierry Correia	(Spain) Valencia	Venezia	Free
2 July 2026	(Austria) Michael Svoboda	Venezia	(England) Brighton	Undisclosed
2 July 2026	Marco Varnier	Juve Stabia	Südtirol	Free
2 July 2026	(Argentina) Franco Carboni	Inter	Parma	Undisclosed
2 July 2026	Emanuele Bassi	Cremonese	Pergolettese	Loan
2 July 2026	Salvatore Dore	Cremonese	Renate	Loan
3 July 2026	(Spain) Alfonso Pedraza	(Spain) Villarreal	Lazio	Free
3 July 2026	(Spain) Víctor Narro	Sampdoria	(Spain) Hércules	Loan
3 July 2026	(Greece) Antonis Siatounis	Potenza	Benevento	Free
3 July 2026	Gabriele Moncini	Bari	Vicenza	Undisclosed
4 July 2026	Leonardo Baroncelli	Fiorentina	Gubbio	Undisclosed
4 July 2026	(England) Demi Akarakiri	Everton	Cagliari	Free
4 July 2026	Tommaso Cassandro	Como	Palermo	Undisclosed
4 July 2026	Federico Chinetti	Como	Mantova	Loan
4 July 2026	(Nigeria) David Ankeye	Genoa	(Serbia) Železničar Pančevo	Undisclosed
5 July 2026	(Netherlands) Denzel Dumfries	Inter	(Spain) Real Madrid	Undisclosed
5 July 2026	(Albania) Ylber Ramadani	Lecce	(Turkey) Çorum	Undisclosed
6 July 2026	(Georgia (country)) Giorgi Chakvetadze	(England) Watford	Udinese	Undisclosed
6 July 2026	(Brazil) Logan Gaspar	(Brazil) America RJ	Benevento	Undisclosed
6 July 2026	(Brazil) Hernani	Monza	Palermo	Undisclosed
6 July 2026	Alessandro Pietrelli	Juve Next Gen	Vicenza	Undisclosed
6 July 2026	Giacomo De Pieri	Inter	Ascoli	Undisclosed
7 July 2026	Antonio Raimondo	Bologna	Frosinone	Loan
7 July 2026	Wisdom Amey	Bologna	Frosinone	Loan
7 July 2026	Tommaso Duca	Cremonese	Folgore Caratese	Loan
7 July 2026	Michele Paganetto	Cremonese	Ospitaletto	Loan
7 July 2026	Federico Ragnoli Galli	Cremonese	Ospitaletto	Loan
7 July 2026	Luca Zanimacchia	Cremonese	Padova	Undisclosed
7 July 2026	(Argentina) Julián Illanes	Carrarese	Arezzo	Undisclosed
8 July 2026	Giulio Patrignani	Cremonese	Savona	Loan
8 July 2026	(Spain) Unai Gómez	(Spain) Athletic Bilbao	Udinese	Undisclosed
8 July 2026	(Romania) Radu Drăgușin	(England) Tottenham	Fiorentina	Loan
8 July 2026	Eddy Kouadio	Fiorentina	Monza	Loan
8 July 2026	Riccardo Marchizza	Frosinone	Vicenza	Undisclosed
8 July 2026	Ivan Provedel	Lazio	Inter	Undisclosed
8 July 2026	(Greece) Christos Alexiou	Inter	(Greece) AEK Athens	Loan
8 July 2026	Michele D'Ausilio	Avellino	(Greece) Iraklis	Loan
8 July 2026	Antonio De Cristofaro	Avellino	Latina	Loan
8 July 2026	Marco Ladisa	Venezia	Trento	Loan
8 July 2026	(France) Sambaly Keita	(France) Villefranche	Mantova	Undisclosed
8 July 2026	(Senegal) Alioune Sylla	Siracusa	Benevento	Undisclosed
8 July 2026	Lorenzo Insigne	Pescara	Sampdoria	Free
8 July 2026	Lapo Nava	Cremonese	Alcione	Loan
8 July 2026	Daniele Triacca	Cremonese	Lecco	Loan
8 July 2026	Michele Pezzolato	Modena	Pianese	Loan
9 July 2026	Gaetano Oristanio	Venezia	Torino	Loan
9 July 2026	Lorenzo Amatucci	Fiorentina	(Spain) Deportivo	Undisclosed
9 July 2026	(Kosovo) Albion Rrahmani	(Czech Republic) Sparta Prague	Venezia	Undisclosed
9 July 2026	(Guadeloupe) Kenny Mixtur	(France) Villefranche	Südtirol	Undisclosed
9 July 2026	Giacomo Stabile	Inter	Südtirol	Loan
9 July 2026	(Spain) Ale Gomes	(Spain) Zaragoza	Venezia	Undisclosed
9 July 2026	(Moldova) Sergiu Perciun	Torino	Ascoli	Loan
9 July 2026	Gianluca Gaetano	Cagliari	Atalanta	Undisclosed
9 July 2026	Tommaso Guercio	(Poland) Śląsk Wrocław	Carrarese	Loan
9 July 2026	Pietro Pinelli	Lazio	Carrarese	Loan
9 July 2026	(Ivory Coast) Junior Ajayi	Verona	Casertana	Loan
9 July 2026	Federico Magro	Verona	Casertana	Loan
9 July 2026	Giacomo Olzer	Pescara	Modena	Undisclosed
10 July 2026	(Belgium) Gaëtan Coucke	Sampdoria	(Belgium) Cercle Brugge	Undisclosed
10 July 2026	Mattia Scaringi	Cremonese	Torres	Loan
10 July 2026	Alessandro Plizzari	Venezia	Südtirol	Loan
10 July 2026	Tommaso Martinelli	Fiorentina	Avellino	Loan
10 July 2026	Brando Moruzzi	Juve Next Gen	Avellino	Loan
10 July 2026	Giacomo Faticanti	Juve Next Gen	Avellino	Loan
10 July 2026	(Austria) Elias Havel	(Austria) LASK	Genoa	Undisclosed
10 July 2026	(Spain) Mario Gila	Lazio	Milan	Undisclosed
10 July 2026	Pietro Beruatto	Pisa	Benevento	Undisclosed
10 July 2026	Alberto Cerri	Cesena	Arezzo	Undisclosed
10 July 2026	Giacomo Marconi	Parma	Carrarese	Loan
11 July 2026	(France) Arthur Atta	Udinese	Fiorentina	Undisclosed
11 July 2026	Salvatore Cerbone	Casarano	Verona	Undisclosed
11 July 2026	Nicola Leali	Genoa	Verona	Free
11 July 2026	(Luxembourg) Seid Korać	Venezia	Verona	Loan
11 July 2026	Alessio Pozzi	Vis Pesaro	Venezia	Undisclosed
11 July 2026	(Brazil) Paulo Azzi	Monza	Modena	Undisclosed
11 July 2026	(Australia) Mark Natta	(Australia) Newcastle Jets	Cesena	Undisclosed
11 July 2026	(Luxembourg) Danel Sinani	(Germany) FC St. Pauli	Sampdoria	Free
11 July 2026	Tommaso Marras	Mantova	Pisa	Undisclosed
11 July 2026	Nicolò Brighenti	Catanzaro	Vicenza	Free
12 July 2026	Giorgio Cittadini	Atalanta	Frosinone	Loan
12 July 2026	Seydou Fini	Genoa	Frosinone	Loan
12 July 2026	Gabriele Calvani	Genoa	Frosinone	Loan
12 July 2026	(The Gambia) Abdoulie Ndow	Frosinone	Spezia	Undisclosed
13 July 2026	Jacopo Fazzini	Fiorentina	Cagliari	Loan
13 July 2026	(Morocco) Anouar El Azzouzi	(Germany) Fortuna Düsseldorf	Frosinone	Undisclosed
13 July 2026	(Malta) Kevin Cannavò	Venezia	Spezia	Loan
13 July 2026	Alessandro Cardinali	Parma	Spezia	Loan
13 July 2026	Denis Cazzadori	Verona	Spezia	Undisclosed
13 July 2026	(Uruguay) Gastón Brugman	Pescara	Modena	Undisclosed
13 July 2026	(Guinea) Moustapha Cissé	Atalanta U23	Carrarese	Loan
13 July 2026	(Canada) Ismael Cajazzo	Casarano	Mantova	Undisclosed
13 July 2026	Matteo Spinaccè	Inter U23	Mantova	Loan
13 July 2026	Gennaro Acampora	Pescara	Ascoli	Undisclosed
13 July 2026	Alessandro Mallamo	Südtirol	Union Brescia	Undisclosed
14 July 2026	Leonardo Sernicola	Cremonese	Benevento	Loan
14 July 2026	Fellipe Jack	Como	Cremonese	Loan
14 July 2026	Fabio Gerli	Modena	Cremonese	Undisclosed
14 July 2026	(Brazil) Stênio	(Ukraine) Karpaty Lviv	Modena	Undisclosed
14 July 2026	(Netherlands) Danilho Doekhi	(Germany) Union Berlin	Lazio	Free
14 July 2026	Jonas Harder	Fiorentina	(Switzerland) Basel	Undisclosed
14 July 2026	Maat Daniel Caprini	Fiorentina	Cesena	Loan
14 July 2026	Luca Di Maggio	Inter	Avellino	Undisclosed
14 July 2026	Edoardo Zanaga	Empoli	Milan Futuro	Undisclosed
14 July 2026	Lorenzo Ignacchiti	Empoli	Mantova	Undisclosed
14 July 2026	Filippo Vesentini	Union Brescia	Mantova	Undisclosed
14 July 2026	Federico Accornero	Carrarese	Trento	Loan
14 July 2026	(Argentina) Mateo Scheffer Bracco	Carrarese	Pineto	Loan
14 July 2026	Nicolò Postiglione	Pineto	Catanzaro	Undisclosed
14 July 2026	Giacomo Corona	Palermo	Virtus Entella	Loan
14 July 2026	(Cape Verde) Vasco Lopes	(Poland) Radomiak	Südtirol	Undisclosed
14 July 2026	Samuele Capolupo	Monza	Spezia	Loan
14 July 2026	Nicola Patanè	Verona	Juve Stabia	Undisclosed
15 July 2026	(England) Harry Winks	(England) Leicester	Cagliari	Undisclosed
15 July 2026	Mattia Motolese	Bologna	Virtus Entella	Loan
15 July 2026	Mattia Liberali	Catanzaro	Como	Undisclosed
15 July 2026	Giuseppe Leone	Juve Stabia	Pisa	Undisclosed
15 July 2026	Frank Tsadjout	Cremonese	Vicenza	Undisclosed
16 July 2026	(Finland) Niklas Pyyhtiä	Bologna	Südtirol	Loan
16 July 2026	Riccardo Stivanello	Bologna	Südtirol	Loan
16 July 2026	(Spain) Álex Jiménez	(England) Bournemouth	Fiorentina	Loan
16 July 2026	Diego Mascardi	Spezia	Torino	Undisclosed
16 July 2026	Luca Schirone	Pineto	Cesena	Undisclosed
16 July 2026	(Netherlands) Terrence Douglas	(Netherlands) Eindhoven	Juve Stabia	Free
17 July 2026	(Ivory Coast) Hamed Traorè	(France) Marseille	Genoa	Loan
17 July 2026	(Bosnia and Herzegovina) Tarik Muharemović	Sassuolo	(England) Leeds	Undisclosed
17 July 2026	(Germany) Omar Haktab Traoré	Udinese	(England) Watford	Undisclosed
17 July 2026	(Spain) Bruno Galassi	(Spain) Real Madrid	Lazio	Undisclosed
17 July 2026	(Germany) Robin Gosens	Fiorentina	(Germany) Schalke 04	Loan
17 July 2026	(Spain) Andrés Cuenca	(Spain) Barcelona	Como	Undisclosed
18 July 2026	Mattia Fortin	(France) Lens	Palermo	Loan
18 July 2026	Sebastiano Desplanches	Palermo	Frosinone	Loan
18 July 2026	(Kosovo) Mërgim Vojvoda	Como	Udinese	Undisclosed
18 July 2026	(Poland) Mateusz Kowalski	Parma	Dolomiti Bellunesi	Loan
18 July 2026	Luca Ravanelli	Monza	Sampdoria	Undisclosed
18 July 2026	(Norway) Tobias Lauritsen	(Netherlands) Sparta Rotterdam	Sampdoria	Undisclosed
18 July 2026	(Poland) Filip Marchwiński	Lecce	(Poland) Cracovia	Loan
18 July 2026	(Germany) Yannik Engelhardt	Como	(Germany) SC Freiburg	Undisclosed
18 July 2026	Nicolas Trabucchi	Parma	Dolomiti Bellunesi	Loan
18 July 2026	Luigi Caccavo	Bologna	Juve Stabia	Loan
18 July 2026	Jacopo Antolini	Torino	Pergolettese	Loan
18 July 2026	Lorenzo Moretti	Cremonese	Novara	Undisclosed
19 July 2026	(Morocco) Amir Richardson	Fiorentina	(France) Le Havre	Loan
19 July 2026	(Ivory Coast) Christ Inao Oulaï	(Turkey) Trabzonspor	Fiorentina	Undisclosed
19 July 2026	Mirko Elia	Fiorentina	Bari	Loan
20 July 2026	(Niger) Rahim Alhassane	(Spain) Real Oviedo	Bologna	Loan
20 July 2026	Francesco Dell'Aquila	Torino	Empoli	Undisclosed
20 July 2026	Francesco Benassai	Vicenza	Trento	Undisclosed
21 July 2026	Filippo Distefano	Fiorentina	Empoli	Undisclosed
21 July 2026	Alessandro Bianco	Fiorentina	Modena	Undisclosed
21 July 2026	Marco Delle Monache	Lecce	Pineto	Loan
21 July 2026	Giovanni Di Renzo	Venezia	Pineto	Undisclosed
21 July 2026	(Czech Republic) Daniel Fila	Venezia	Avellino	Loan
21 July 2026	Francesco Galuppini	Ascoli	Ospitaletto	Loan
21 July 2026	Filippo Guccione	Arezzo	Pescara	Undisclosed
22 July 2026	(Czech Republic) Antonín Barák	Fiorentina	(Cyprus) APOEL	Undisclosed
22 July 2026	(Spain) Álex Sala	Lecce	(Spain) Mallorca	Loan
22 July 2026	Matteo Cocchi	Inter	Padova	Loan
22 July 2026	Matteo Lovato	Salernitana	Padova	Loan
22 July 2026	(Nigeria) Akor Adams	(Spain) Sevilla	Venezia	Undisclosed
22 July 2026	Andrea Oliveri	Atalanta	Ascoli	Loan
22 July 2026	Jacopo Romio	Vicenza	Arzignano	Loan
22 July 2026	Francesco Reita	Monza	Catanzaro	Loan
23 July 2026	Filippo Rinaldi	Parma	Catania	Loan
23 July 2026	Gabriele Pagliai	Ascoli	Catania	Loan
23 July 2026	Gian Marco Crespi	(Greece) Athens Kallithea	Ascoli	Undisclosed
23 July 2026	(Nigeria) Rafiu Durosinmi	Pisa	(Belgium) Genk	Undisclosed
23 July 2026	Mattia Valoti	Spezia	Vicenza	Free
23 July 2026	Romeo Sandrucci	Torino	Juve Stabia	Loan
24 July 2026	Andrea Bozzolan	Reggiana	Palermo	Loan
24 July 2026	(Denmark) Luca Kjerrumgaard	Udinese	(England) Watford	Undisclosed
24 July 2026	(Spain) Iker Bravo	Udinese	(England) Watford	Undisclosed
24 July 2026	(Albania) Luis Hasa	Napoli	Frosinone	Undisclosed
24 July 2026	Alessio Zerbin	Napoli	Frosinone	Undisclosed
24 July 2026	Nicola Pintus	Cagliari	Pianese	Loan
24 July 2026	Francesco Gallea	Cagliari	Juve Stabia	Loan
24 July 2026	Giulio Scuderi	Fiorentina	Juve Stabia	Loan
24 July 2026	(Portugal) Ricardo Mangas	(Portugal) Sporting CP	Monza	Loan
24 July 2026	(Venezuela) Alessandro Milani	Lazio	Inter U23	Undisclosed
24 July 2026	Antonio Candela	Spezia	Catanzaro	Loan
24 July 2026	(Chad) Franky Tchaouna	Enna	Catanzaro	Undisclosed
24 July 2026	(Chad) Franck Tchaouna	Enna	Catanzaro	Undisclosed
24 July 2026	(Ghana) Felix Afena-Gyan	Cremonese	(Turkey) Iğdır	Undisclosed
24 July 2026	Marco Festa	Mantova	Cremonese	Undisclosed
24 July 2026	Giacomo Gabbiani	Cremonese	Livorno	Loan
24 July 2026	(Netherlands) Xavello Druiventak	(Bulgaria) Fratria	Cesena	Undisclosed
24 July 2026	(The Gambia) Eliman Cham	Carrarese	Virtus Francavilla	Undisclosed
25 July 2026	Samuele Regazzetti	Cremonese	Livorno	Undisclosed
25 July 2026	Simone Pontisso	Catanzaro	Cremonese	Undisclosed
25 July 2026	Ange Achi	Cremonese	(Finland) SJK Akatemia	Undisclosed
27 July 2026	(Portugal) Gustavo Varela	(Portugal) Benfica	Monza	Undisclosed
27 July 2026	(Serbia) Aljoša Vasić	Palermo	Südtirol	Loan
27 July 2026	(Greece) Dimitrios Nikolaou	Palermo	OFI Crete	Loan
27 July 2026	Lorenzo Carissoni	Juve Stabia	Padova	Undisclosed
27 July 2026	Emanuele Zuelli	Carrarese	Padova	Undisclosed
28 July 2026	(Poland) Adrian Benedyczak	Parma	(Turkey) Kasımpaşa	Undisclosed
28 July 2026	(Republic of Ireland) Ed McJannet	Lecce	Cosenza	Loan
28 July 2026	(Belgium) Loïs Openda	Juventus	(France) Lyon	Loan
28 July 2026	(Romania) Rareș Ilie	(France) Nice	Mantova	Undisclosed
28 July 2026	(Albania) Adi Kurti	Verona	Audace Cerignola	Loan
28 July 2026	Federico Valentini	Cesena	Forlì	Undisclosed
29 July 2026	(France) Sankhoun Diawara	(France) Troyes	Milan	Undisclosed
29 July 2026	Federico Barba	(Indonesia) Persib	Palermo	Free
29 July 2026	Riccardo Pagano	Roma	Cesena	Loan
29 July 2026	Pietro Comuzzo	Fiorentina	Torino	Loan
29 July 2026	(Argentina) Mikel Amondarain	(Argentina) Estudiantes	Bologna	Undisclosed
29 July 2026	Mattia Compagnon	Venezia	Verona	Loan
29 July 2026	(Switzerland) Eray Cömert	(Spain) Valencia	Torino	Free
29 July 2026	(Venezuela) Luis Balbo	Fiorentina	(Austria) Sturm Graz	Undisclosed
29 July 2026	(Chile) Damián Pizarro	Udinese	(Chile) Audax Italiano	Loan
29 July 2026	Mattia Della Rocca	Roma	Avellino	Undisclosed
29 July 2026	Filippo Scotti	Milan Futuro	Avellino	Undisclosed
29 July 2026	Gianmarco Todisco	Avellino	Foggia	Undisclosed
29 July 2026	Andrea Cagnano	Avellino	Arezzo	Undisclosed
29 July 2026	(France) Stredair Appuah	Palermo	(Belgium) Lommel	Loan
29 July 2026	(Guinea) Cheick Condé	Venezia	(Belgium) Beveren	Free
30 July 2026	Alessandro Dellavalle	Torino	Padova	Loan
30 July 2026	(England) John Stones	(England) Manchester City	Inter	Free
30 July 2026	(Argentina) Santiago Castro	Bologna	Roma	Undisclosed
30 July 2026	(Ukraine) Artem Dovbyk	Roma	Bologna	Loan
30 July 2026	(Ukraine) Rareș Burnete	Lecce	Südtirol	Loan
30 July 2026	(Argentina) Matías Moreno	Fiorentina	Venezia	Loan
30 July 2026	(Mali) Coli Saco	Napoli	(Latvia) Riga	Undisclosed
30 July 2026	Gianluca Saro	Cremonese	Foggia	Undisclosed
30 July 2026	(United States) Kristoffer Lund	Palermo	(England) Birmingham	Undisclosed
31 July 2026	Samuele Mulattieri	Sassuolo	Verona	Loan
31 July 2026	(Scotland) Kieron Bowie	Verona	Sassuolo	Loan
31 July 2026	Emanuele Rao	Napoli	Pisa	Loan
31 July 2026	(Albania) Mario Mitaj	(Saudi Arabia) Al-Ittihad	Genoa	Loan
31 July 2026	(Spain) Ousmane Diallo	(Germany) Borussia Dortmund	Parma	Undisclosed
31 July 2026	Raphael Kofler	Südtirol	Cagliari	Loan
31 July 2026	Davide Veroli	Cagliari	Südtirol	Loan
31 July 2026	(Poland) Mateusz Wieteska	Cagliari	(Poland) Wieczysta Kraków	Undisclosed
31 July 2026	Federico Ravaglia	Bologna	(England) Watford	Undisclosed
31 July 2026	(Argentina) Martín Payero	Udinese	(England) Watford	Undisclosed
31 July 2026	Simone Pafundi	Udinese	Catanzaro	Loan
31 July 2026	(Spain) Víctor Valdepeñas	(Spain) Real Madrid	Fiorentina	Undisclosed
31 July 2026	(Netherlands) Kian Fitz-Jim	(Netherlands) Ajax	Torino	Undisclosed
31 July 2026	Mattia Viti	(France) Nice	Sampdoria	Undisclosed
31 July 2026	(Poland) Kacper Sezonienko	(Poland) Lechia Gdańsk	Verona	Undisclosed
31 July 2026	(Spain) Yellu Santiago	Verona	(Portugal) Marítimo	Loan
31 July 2026	(Sweden) Karlson Nwanege	Verona	(Finland) SJK Akatemia	6-month loan
1 August 2026	(Nigeria) Kevin Akpoguma	(Germany) TSG Hoffenheim	Frosinone	Free
1 August 2026	(Nigeria) Ebenezer Akinsanmiro	Inter	Monza	Loan
1 August 2026	(Morocco) Redouane Halhal	(Belgium) Mechelen	Venezia	Undisclosed
1 August 2026	(Greece) Konstantinos Koulierakis	(Germany) VfL Wolfsburg	Roma	Undisclosed
1 August 2026	Marco Ruggero	Spezia	Catanzaro	Loan
1 August 2026	Lorenzo Malanca	Sampdoria	Vado	Loan
1 August 2026	Simone Zanon	Carrarese	Pisa	Loan
1 August 2026	Dominic Vavassori	Atalanta U23	Palermo	Loan
2 August 2026	(Bosnia and Herzegovina) Kerim Alajbegović	(Germany) Bayer Leverkusen	Juventus	€32M
2 August 2026	(France) Willem Geubbels	(France) Paris	Lecce	Undisclosed
2 August 2026	(Zimbabwe) Jordan Zemura	Udinese	(England) Watford	Loan
2 August 2026	(Switzerland) Simon Sohm	Fiorentina	Venezia	Loan
2 August 2026	(Bulgaria) Velizar-Ilia Iliev	Cagliari	Cosenza	Loan
2 August 2026	Andrea Cogoni	Cagliari	Cosenza	Undisclosed
2 August 2026	(France) Randal Kolo Muani	(France) Paris Saint-Germain	Juventus	€41.2M
3 August 2026	(Portugal) João Mário	Juventus	Fiorentina	Loan
3 August 2026	(Montenegro) Vasilije Adžić	Juventus	Sassuolo	Loan
3 August 2026	Giuseppe Panico	Avellino	Foggia	Undisclosed
3 August 2026	(Spain) Estanis Pedrola	Sampdoria	(Spain) Real Oviedo	Undisclosed
3 August 2026	(Bulgaria) Mert Durmush	Pisa	Spezia	Loan
4 August 2026	Alessandro Debenedetti	Genoa	Cesena	Loan
4 August 2026	(Paraguay) Hugo Cuenca	Genoa	(Spain) Celta Fortuna	Loan
5 August 2026	(Spain) Miguel Gutiérrez	Napoli	(Germany) Bayer Leverkusen	Undisclosed
5 August 2026	(Spain) Angeliño	Roma	(Spain) Deportivo	Loan
5 August 2026	(Austria) Christian Früchtl	Lecce	(Austria) RB Salzburg	Undisclosed
6 August 2026	(France) Ahmed Sidibé	Venezia	(Portugal) Vitória	Loan
6 August 2026	(Poland) Daniel Mikołajewski	Parma	(Switzerland) Luzern	Loan
6 August 2026	(Brazil) Yan Couto	(Germany) Borussia Dortmund	Como	Loan
6 August 2026	(Switzerland) Djibril Sow	(Spain) Sevilla	Genoa	Undisclosed
6 August 2026	Alessandro Vogliacco	Genoa	Cremonese	Undisclosed
6 August 2026	Manuel Gasparini	Empoli	Mantova	Undisclosed
6 August 2026	(Brazil) Gabriel Strefezza	(Greece) Olympiacos	Palermo	Undisclosed
6 August 2026	(Switzerland) Filip Stojilković	Pisa	(Romania) Rapid București	Loan
6 August 2026	Stefano Girelli	Sampdoria	Casertana	Undisclosed
7 August 2026	(Albania) Marash Kumbulla	Roma	(Spain) Rayo Vallecano	Loan
7 August 2026	(Iceland) Bjarki Steinn Bjarkason	Venezia	Südtirol	Undisclosed
7 August 2026	Simone Ascione	Venezia	Vis Pesaro	Undisclosed
7 August 2026	(Argentina) Franco Mastantuono	(Spain) Real Madrid	Fiorentina	Loan
7 August 2026	(Mali) El Bilal Touré	Atalanta	Parma	Loan
7 August 2026	(Bulgaria) Dimitar Papazov	Bologna	Perugia	Undisclosed
7 August 2026	(England) Jay Robinson	(England) Southampton	Monza	Loan
7 August 2026	(Argentina) Nicolás Valentini	Fiorentina	(England) Alavés	Undisclosed
7 August 2026	Lorenzo Sgarbi	Napoli	Sambenedettese	Loan
7 August 2026	Marco Pompetti	Catanzaro	Padova	Undisclosed
7 August 2026	(France) Ichem Ferrah	(France) Lille	Pisa	Undisclosed
8 August 2026	Antonio Boccadamo	Virtus Entella	Audace Cerignola	Loan
8 August 2026	Claudio Manzi	Avellino	Scafatese	Undisclosed
9 August 2026	(England) Trevoh Chalobah	(England) Chelsea	Como	Undisclosed
9 August 2026	Daniel Maldini	Atalanta	Cagliari	Loan
9 August 2026	Marco Cassin	Cremonese	Monopoli	Loan
10 August 2026	Patrizio Masini	Genoa	Frosinone	Loan
10 August 2026	Simone Scaglia	Juventus	Padova	Loan
10 August 2026	(Spain) Kevin Carlos	(France) Nice	Cagliari	Loan
10 August 2026	Giuseppe Aurelio	Spezia	Cagliari	Undisclosed
10 August 2026	Giuseppe Ciocci	Cagliari	Spezia	Undisclosed
10 August 2026	(Poland) Radosław Żelezny	Roma	Perugia	Loan
10 August 2026	(Venezuela) Daniele Quieto	Inter	Cosenza	Undisclosed
10 August 2026	(Morocco) Aymen Zouin	Inter	Parma	Undisclosed
10 August 2026	Filippo Tosi	Cremonese	Monopoli	Loan
10 August 2026	Federico Caia	Verona	Verona	Undisclosed
10 August 2026	Giovanni Bonfanti	Atalanta	(Spain) Las Palmas	Loan
11 August 2026	(Argentina) Benjamín Domínguez	Bologna	Sassuolo	Loan
11 August 2026	Gabriele Guarino	Empoli	(Turkey) Samsunspor	Undisclosed
11 August 2026	(Denmark) Peter Vindahl	(Czech Republic) Sparta Prague	Sampdoria	Loan
11 August 2026	Marco Nichetti	Virtus Entella	Novara	Undisclosed
11 August 2026	Michael Venturi	Venezia	Avellino	Loan
12 August 2026	(Belgium) Romelu Lukaku	Napoli	(Turkey) Fenerbahçe	Undisclosed
12 August 2026	(Austria) Stefan Posch	Como	(Germany) 1. FSV Mainz 05	Undisclosed
12 August 2026	(Austria) Florian Grillitsch	(Portugal) Braga	Frosinone	Undisclosed
12 August 2026	(Austria) Romano Schmid	(Germany) Werder Bremen	Frosinone	Undisclosed
12 August 2026	(Argentina) Nahuel Molina	(Spain) Atlético Madrid	Roma	Undisclosed
12 August 2026	(Netherlands) Othniël Raterink	Cagliari	(Netherlands) ADO Den Haag	Loan
12 August 2026	Riccardo Braschi	Fiorentina	(Switzerland) Thun	Undisclosed
12 August 2026	Gabriele Bertolini	Fiorentina	Atalanta U23	Undisclosed
12 August 2026	Nicola Mosti	Juve Stabia	Catanzaro	Undisclosed
12 August 2026	Gennaro Iaccarino	Napoli	Arezzo	Undisclosed
12 August 2026	(Argentina) Federico Gattoni	(Spain) Sevilla	Ascoli	Undisclosed
12 August 2026	(Belgium) Jean-Pierre Longonda	(Slovenia) Koper	Mantova	Loan
13 August 2026	Roberto Piccoli	Fiorentina	Bologna	Loan
13 August 2026	(Argentina) Mateo Pellegrino	Parma	Fiorentina	Undisclosed
13 August 2026	(Chile) Matías Pérez	Lecce	(Chile) La Serena	Loan
13 August 2026	(Denmark) Thomas Kristensen	Udinese	Atalanta	Loan
13 August 2026	Tommaso Arrigoni	Cesena	Livorno	Loan
13 August 2026	(Guinea-Bissau) Saná Fernandes	Lazio	Juve Stabia	Loan
13 August 2026	(Algeria) Mehdi Dorval	Bari	Catanzaro	Loan
13 August 2026	Cristian Cauz	Modena	Empoli	Undisclosed
13 August 2026	Salvatore Elia	Empoli	Cremonese	Undisclosed
14 August 2026	Davide Frattesi	Inter	Lazio	Loan
14 August 2026	Matteo Motta	Inter	Pescara	Undisclosed
14 August 2026	(Serbia) Mihajlo Ilić	Bologna	Cesena	Loan
14 August 2026	Giorgio Altare	Venezia	Pescara	Undisclosed
14 August 2026	(Serbia) Aleksa Terzić	(Austria) RB Salzburg	Frosinone	Undisclosed
14 August 2026	(Argentina) David Romero	(Argentina) Tigre	Parma	Undisclosed
14 August 2026	(Sweden) Jacob Ondrejka	Parma	(Netherlands) Groningen	Loan
14 August 2026	(Finland) Jasper Samooja	Lecce	(Finland) HJK	Loan
14 August 2026	(France) Andréa Le Borgne	Como	Verona	Loan
14 August 2026	(Uruguay) Agustín Álvarez	Sassuolo	(Argentina) Talleres	Loan
14 August 2026	(Spain) Rafael Obrador	(Portugal) Benfica	Sassuolo	Loan
14 August 2026	(Switzerland) Zachary Athekame	Milan	(France) Lyon	Loan
14 August 2026	Jacopo Manconi	Benevento	Casertana	Undisclosed
14 August 2026	Davide Bettella	Pescara	Juve Stabia	Undisclosed
14 August 2026	(Croatia) David Vujević	(Switzerland) Zürich	Carrarese	Undisclosed
14 August 2026	(France) Karim Zedadka	Südtirol	Empoli	Loan
15 August 2026	(England) Djed Spence	(England) Tottenham	Inter	Undisclosed
15 August 2026	Antonio Cioffi	Napoli	Latina	Undisclosed
15 August 2026	(Martinique) Janis Antiste	Sassuolo	(Poland) Górnik Zabrze	Loan
15 August 2026	Flavio Russo	Sassuolo	Catania	Loan
16 August 2026	Andrea Giorgini	Juve Stabia	Südtirol	Undisclosed
17 August 2026	(Colombia) Jhon Lucumí	Bologna	Juventus	€20.1M
17 August 2026	(Netherlands) Thijs Dallinga	Bologna	(Germany) 1. FC Köln	Loan
17 August 2026	Mattia Vitale	Vicenza	Salernitana	Loan
17 August 2026	(Mali) Salim Diakité	Palermo	(Belgium) Zulte Waregem	Loan
18 August 2026	Thomas Berenbruch	Inter	Avellino	Loan
18 August 2026	(France) Mamadou Kebbeh	Cesena	Torres	Loan
18 August 2026	Luca D'Andrea	Sassuolo	Cesena	Loan
18 August 2026	Fabio Rispoli	Como	Südtirol	Loan
18 August 2026	Luigi Cherubini	Roma	Benevento	Loan
18 August 2026	Guglielmo Vicario	(England) Tottenham	Juventus	Loan
18 August 2026	(Germany) David Odogu	Milan	(France) Toulouse	Loan
18 August 2026	Wisdom Acquah	Torino	Modena	Loan
18 August 2026	Nunzio Lella	Venezia	Verona	Undisclosed
18 August 2026	(Poland) Paweł Dawidowicz	(Poland) Raków	Verona	Free
18 August 2026	(Sweden) Arvid Brorsson	Monza	(Poland) Raków	Undisclosed
18 August 2026	Matteo Cortesi	Arezzo	Perugia	Loan
18 August 2026	(Argentina) Thomás de Martis	(Argentina) Lanús	Parma	Loan
19 August 2026	(Portugal) Rodrigo Mora	(Portugal) Porto	Roma	Undisclosed
19 August 2026	Lorenzo Montipò	Verona	Venezia	Undisclosed
19 August 2026	Michele Castagnetti	Cesena	Reggiana	Undisclosed
19 August 2026	Filippo Reale	Roma	Carrarese	Loan
19 August 2026	(Switzerland) Michel Aebischer	Pisa	(Germany) Union Berlin	Undisclosed
19 August 2026	Costantino Favasuli	Catanzaro	Napoli	Loan
19 August 2026	(Sweden) Nermin Karić	Virtus Entella	Juve Stabia	Undisclosed
19 August 2026	(Belgium) Diego Moreira	(France) Strasbourg	Milan	Undisclosed
19 August 2026	Marco Bleve	Carrarese	Lecce	Undisclosed
19 August 2026	Matteo Ricci	Sampdoria	Ascoli	Free
19 August 2026	(Australia) Alessandro Circati	Parma	(Portugal) Benfica	Undisclosed
19 August 2026	(Egypt) Omar Fayed	(Turkey) Fenerbahçe	Frosinone	Undisclosed
19 August 2026	(Portugal) Leonardo Buta	Udinese	(France) Red Star	Undisclosed
19 August 2026	(Spain) Andrés Cuenca	Como	(Spain) Sporting Gijón	Undisclosed
19 August 2026	Alessandro Luchetti	Frosinone	Verona	Undisclosed
20 August 2026	(Senegal) Cheikh Niasse	Verona	(Turkey) Gençlerbirliği	Loan
20 August 2026	(Brazil) Isaac	Verona	(Croatia) Istra	Loan
20 August 2026	Andrea Petagna	Monza	Pisa	Undisclosed
20 August 2026	Enea Pitti	Cesena	Grosseto	Undisclosed
20 August 2026	Giovanni Zaro	Cesena	Ravenna	Undisclosed
20 August 2026	Jacopo Gelli	Frosinone	Cesena	Loan
20 August 2026	Emanuele Pecorino	Juventus	Catanzaro	Undisclosed
20 August 2026	Samuel Giovane	Atalanta	Catanzaro	Undisclosed
20 August 2026	Nicola Pietrangeli	Südtirol	Juve Stabia	Loan
21 August 2026	Niccolò Fortini	Fiorentina	Torino	Loan
21 August 2026	Luca Moro	Sassuolo	Padova	Loan
21 August 2026	(Germany) Idrissa Touré	Pisa	Monza	Undisclosed
21 August 2026	(Brazil) Matheus Luz	Juve Stabia	Potenza	Loan
21 August 2026	(Croatia) Ante Vuković	Pisa	Juve Stabia	Loan
21 August 2026	(France) Omar Correia	Juve Stabia	Pisa	Undisclosed
21 August 2026	Alessandro Confente	Juve Stabia	Pisa	Undisclosed
21 August 2026	(England) Curtis Jones	(England) Liverpool	Inter	Undisclosed
21 August 2026	(Belgium) Fedde Leysen	(Belgium) Union SG	Sassuolo	Loan
21 August 2026	(France) Antoine Joujou	Parma	(France) Nantes	Undisclosed
21 August 2026	(The Gambia) Alieu Fadera	Como	Cagliari	Loan
21 August 2026	(Serbia) Vanja Vlahović	Atalanta	Mantova	Loan
21 August 2026	(Paraguay) Antonio Sanabria	Cremonese	(Brazil) Internacional	Undisclosed
21 August 2026	(Albania) Sergio Kalaj	Frosinone	Spezia	Free
21 August 2026	Aaron Ciammaglichella	Torino	Pro Vercelli	Loan
22 August 2026	(North Macedonia) Eljif Elmas	(Germany) RB Leipzig	Atalanta	Loan
22 August 2026	(France) Benoît Badiashile	(England) Chelsea	Napoli	Loan
22 August 2026	(Croatia) Josip Šutalo	(Netherlands) Ajax	Lazio	Loan
22 August 2026	(France) Abdoulaye Camara	Udinese	(Netherlands) Ajax	Loan
23 August 2026	(Poland) Adam Buksa	Udinese	(Spain) Mallorca	Loan
23 August 2026	(Spain) Antonio Casas	Venezia	(Spain) Sporting Gijón	Loan
24 August 2026	Tommaso Bordoni	Padova	Lecco	Loan
24 August 2026	Luca Vignali	Spezia	Virtus Entella	Undisclosed
24 August 2026	(North Macedonia) Milutin Osmajić	(England) Preston	Genoa	Undisclosed
25 August 2026	Marco Dalla Vecchia	Torino	Cesena	Loan
25 August 2026	(Uruguay) Agustín Albarracín	Cagliari	(Spain) Albacete	Loan
25 August 2026	Michele Di Gregorio	Juventus	(England) Bournemouth	Loan
25 August 2026	Antonino La Gumina	Sampdoria	Salernitana	Free
25 August 2026	Simone Pieraccini	Cesena	Salernitana	Loan
25 August 2026	Nosa Obaretin	Napoli	(France) Lorient	Loan
25 August 2026	(Poland) Kamil Grabara	(Germany) VfL Wolfsburg	Juventus	Loan
25 August 2026	(Sweden) Amar Fatah	(France) Troyes	Lecce	Undisclosed
25 August 2026	(Cameroon) Enzo Tchato	(France) Montpellier	Frosinone	Undisclosed
25 August 2026	(Gabon) Jérémy Oyono	Frosinone	Spezia	Loan
25 August 2026	Tommaso Fumagalli	Como	Inter U23	Undisclosed
25 August 2026	(France) Yvan Maye	Inter	Monza	Loan
25 August 2026	(France) Christopher Nkunku	Milan	(Germany) RB Leipzig	Loan
26 August 2026	Mattia Perin	Juventus	Palermo	Undisclosed
26 August 2026	(Democratic Republic of the Congo) Willy Kambwala	(Spain) Villarreal	Como	Loan
26 August 2026	Davide Mancini	Campobasso	Arezzo	Undisclosed
26 August 2026	Lorenzo Coccia	Arezzo	Campobasso	Undisclosed
26 August 2026	Matteo Prati	Cagliari	(Spain) Racing Santander	Loan
26 August 2026	Filippo Grosso	Frosinone	Crotone	Loan
26 August 2026	(Uruguay) Alan Matturro	Genoa	(Ukraine) Shakhtar Donetsk	Undisclosed
26 August 2026	Niccolò Corrado	Frosinone	Empoli	Loan
26 August 2026	Andrea Sodero	Empoli	Trento	Undisclosed
26 August 2026	Enrico Piovanello	Juve Stabia	Casertana	Loan
26 August 2026	Emanuele Torrasi	Juve Stabia	Caaniaa	Undisclosed
26 August 2026	Sebastiano Di Paolo	Cagliari	Avellino	Loan
26 August 2026	Cosimo Patierno	Avellino	Casarano	Undisclosed
26 August 2026	Matteo Brunori	Palermo	Ascoli	Loan
27 August 2026	Andrea Pinamonti	Sassuolo	Lazio	Undisclosed
27 August 2026	Antonio Di Nardo	Pescara	Juve Stabia	Undisclosed
27 August 2026	Jacopo Martini	Südtirol	Carrarese	Undisclosed
27 August 2026	(Slovenia) Luka Topalović	Inter	Carrarese	Loan
27 August 2026	(Serbia) Ivan Ilić	Torino	Lecce	Loan
27 August 2026	(Republic of the Congo) Antoine Makoumbou	(Turkey) Samsunspor	Sampdoria	Loan
27 August 2026	(Romania) Daniel Bîrligea	(Romania) Steaua București	Frosinone	Loan
27 August 2026	Gabriele Artistico	Lazio	Padova	Undisclosed
27 August 2026	Filippo Liberati	Carrarese	Desenzano	Loan
28 August 2026	Elia Tantalocchi	Sampdoria	Vicenza	Undisclosed
28 August 2026	Ettore Broggian	Vicenza	Como	Undisclosed
28 August 2026	Semuel Pizzignacco	Monza	Carrarese	Loan
28 August 2026	Marco Imperiale	Carrarese	Catanzaro	Undisclosed
28 August 2026	(Portugal) Gonçalo Esteves	Catanzaro	Carrarese	Loan
28 August 2026	Gabriele Zappa	Cagliari	Verona	Loan
28 August 2026	Lorenzo Russo	Napoli	Crotone	Loan
28 August 2026	(Morocco) Walid Cheddira	Napoli	Avellino	Undisclosed
28 August 2026	(Croatia) Adrian Šemper	Pisa	(Saudi Arabia) Al-Fateh	Undisclosed
28 August 2026	(Poland) Bartosz Mrozek	(Poland) Lech Poznań	Udinese	Undisclosed
28 August 2026	Giovanni Fabbian	Fiorentina	Parma	Loan
28 August 2026	(Belgium) Cyril Ngonge	Napoli	Monza	Loan
28 August 2026	Rachid Kouda	Parma	Mantova	Loan
28 August 2026	(Spain) Álvaro Morata	Como	(Spain) Leganés	Loan
28 August 2026	Michael Folorunsho	Napoli	Monza	Loan
28 August 2026	Luca Monticelli	Verona	(Belgium) Charleroi	Undisclosed
28 August 2026	Patrick Nuamah	Sassuolo	(Spain) Sabadell	Loan
28 August 2026	Fabio Miretti	Juventus	(Turkey) Beşiktaş	Loan
28 August 2026	(Slovakia) Tomáš Bobček	(Poland) Lechia Gdańsk	Frosinone	Undisclosed
28 August 2026	(France) Sayha Seha	Catanzaro	Perugia	Loan
29 August 2026	(Brazil) Charlys	Verona	Inter U23	Loan
29 August 2026	Alessandro Gabrielloni	Como	Palermo	Loan
29 August 2026	(Brazil) Lucas Perri	(England) Leeds	Torino	Loan
29 August 2026	(Norway) Marcus Holmgren Pedersen	Torino	(Greece) Olympiacos	Undisclosed
29 August 2026	(Ivory Coast) Franck Kessié	(Saudi Arabia) Al-Ahli	Atalanta	Free
29 August 2026	Riccardo Ciervo	Sassuolo	Cagliari	Loan
29 August 2026	Sebastiano Esposito	Cagliari	Sassuolo	Loan
29 August 2026	Samuele Ricci	Milan	Como	Loan
29 August 2026	Alvin Okoro	Venezia	Südtirol	Loan
29 August 2026	(Albania) Kristjan Asllani	Inter	(United Arab Emirates) Al Jazira	Loan
29 August 2026	Alessandro Capello	Arezzo	Lecco	Loan
29 August 2026	Jacopo Bacci	Padova	Sorrento	Undisclosed
29 August 2026	Alessandro Carnaroli	Vis Pesaro	Pisa	Undisclosed
29 August 2026	Alessandro Carnaroli	Pisa	Vis Pesaro	Loan
30 August 2026	(Portugal) Rafael Leão	Milan	(Turkey) Galatasaray	€38M
30 August 2026	(Argentina) Leonardo Balerdi	(France) Marseille	Roma	Loan
30 August 2026	(Belgium) Arthur Theate	(Germany) Eintracht Frankfurt	Bologna	Loan
30 August 2026	(Netherlands) Marten de Roon	Atalanta	Roma	Undisclosed
30 August 2026	(Belgium) Ignace Van Der Brempt	Como	Sassuolo	Loan
30 August 2026	(Norway) Emil Bohinen	Venezia	Cesena	Loan
30 August 2026	(France) Ali Dembélé	Torino	Lecce	Loan
30 August 2026	(Sweden) Alieu Njie	Torino	Fiorentina	Undisclosed
30 August 2026	(Bosnia and Herzegovina) Eman Košpo	Fiorentina	Mantova	Loan
30 August 2026	Davis Mensah	Mantova	Cittadella	Undisclosed
30 August 2026	Filippo Pittarello	Catanzaro	Pisa	Undisclosed
30 August 2026	(Denmark) Henrik Meister	Pisa	(England) Derby County	Loan
30 August 2026	(Germany) Adin Ličina	Juventus Next Gen	Cremonese	Loan
30 August 2026	(Sweden) Peter Amoran	Parma	(Sweden) Västerås	Undisclosed
31 August 2026	Tommaso Macchioni	Sassuolo	Carrarese	Loan
31 August 2026	Filippo Missori	Sassuolo	Avellino	Loan
31 August 2026	(Poland) Jan Ziółkowski	Roma	Monza	Loan
31 August 2026	(France) Yanis Massolin	Inter	Cagliari	Loan
31 August 2026	Giuseppe Sibilli	Bari	Juve Stabia	Undisclosed
31 August 2026	Roberto Gagliardini	Verona	Cagliari	Free
31 August 2026	(Switzerland) Joël Monteiro	(Switzerland) Young Boys	Lecce	Undisclosed
31 August 2026	(Switzerland) Kevin Mbabu	(Denmark) Midtjylland	Sampdoria	Free
31 August 2026	(Brazil) Arthur Melo	Juventus	(Brazil) Santos	Free
31 August 2026	(Brazil) Juan Jesus	Unattached	Venezia	Free
31 August 2026	Pasquale Mazzocchi	Napoli	Venezia	Loan
31 August 2026	Kevin Miranda	Sassuolo	Audace Cerignola	Loan
31 August 2026	Fabrizio Caligara	Sassuolo	Catania	Undisclosed
31 August 2026	(Sweden) Noel Törnqvist	Como	Monza	Loan
31 August 2026	(France) Jérémy Le Douaron	Palermo	(France) Troyes	Loan
31 August 2026	(Mexico) Santiago Giménez	Milan	(Portugal) Porto	Loan
31 August 2026	(England) Omari Hutchinson	(England) Nottingham Forest	Milan	Loan
31 August 2026	Vincenzo Fiorillo	Carrarese	Pescara	Loan
1 September 2026	(Algeria) Rafik Belghali	Verona	Torino	Undisclosed
1 September 2026	Samuele Massolo	Vicenza	Sampdoria	Undisclosed
1 September 2026	Filippo Bandinelli	Spezia	Empoli	Undisclosed
1 September 2026	Giovanni Volpe	Catanzaro	Audace Cerignola	Undisclosed
1 September 2026	Kevin Barcella	Frosinone	Crotone	Loan
1 September 2026	(Spain) Aarón Martín	Genoa	(Spain) Racing Santander	Undisclosed
1 September 2026	(Croatia) Duje Ćaleta-Car	(France) Lyon	Sassuolo	Undisclosed
1 September 2026	Honest Ahanor	Atalanta	(England) Chelsea	Undisclosed (Note: The transfer will be effective in the summer of 2027, as Chelsea couldn't directly loan Ahanor to Crystal Palace in this market session due to Premier League regulations.)
1 September 2026	Honest Ahanor	Atalanta	(England) Crystal Palace	Loan
1 September 2026	(Ghana) Ibrahim Sulemana	Atalanta	Sassuolo	Loan
1 September 2026	(Hungary) Botond Balogh	Parma	(Belgium) Westerlo	Undisclosed
1 September 2026	(Iraq) Marko Farji	Venezia	(Netherlands) Heerenveen	Undisclosed
1 September 2026	(Serbia) Lazar Jovanović	(Germany) VfB Stuttgart	Udinese	Loan
1 September 2026	(Croatia) Branimir Mlačić	Udinese	(England) Watford	Loan
1 September 2026	Nicola Ravaglia	Sampdoria	Carrarese	Free
1 September 2026	Simone Ghidotti	Sampdoria	Parma	Undisclosed
1 September 2026	Lorenzo Paratici	Sampdoria	Roma	Loan
1 September 2026	Filippo Delli Carri	Monza	Sampdoria	Loan
1 September 2026	Nicolas Galazzi	Monza	Padova	Loan
1 September 2026	Tommaso Ravaglioli	Bologna	Lumezzane	Loan
1 September 2026	(Netherlands) Jay Enem	(Serbia) Crvena zvezda	Bologna	Undisclosed
1 September 2026	Edoardo Iannoni	Sassuolo	Verona	Loan
1 September 2026	Daniele Casiraghi	Südtirol	Ravenna	Loan
1 September 2026	Cristian Andreoni	Juve Stabia	Crotone	Undisclosed
1 September 2026	Marco Olivieri	Cesena	Arezzo	Loan
1 September 2026	Antonio Ferrara	Benevento	Scafatese	Undisclosed
1 September 2026	Matteo Casarotto	Virtus Entella	Lecco	Loan
1 September 2026	Marwane Kritta	Lecco	Virtus Entella	Loan
1 September 2026	(Senegal) Pape Matar Sarr	(England) Tottenham	Juventus	Loan
1 September 2026	(Brazil) Diego Carlos	(Turkey) Fenerbahçe	Parma	Loan
1 September 2026	Francesco Folino	Cremonese	Modena	Loan
1 September 2026	Nicholas Bonfanti	Pisa	Carrarese	Loan
1 September 2026	Tommaso Del Lungo	Atalanta	Mantova	Loan
1 September 2026	Paolo Vismara	Atalanta	Juve Stabia	Loan
1 September 2026	Matteo Della Morte	Vicenza	Bari	Undisclosed
1 September 2026	Michele Cavion	Vicenza	Reggiana	Undisclosed
1 September 2026	Lorenzo Tosto	Empoli	Inter U23	Loan
1 September 2026	Flavio Bianchi	Empoli	Bari	Undisclosed
1 September 2026	Mattia Mannini	Roma	Benevento	Loan
1 September 2026	(Angola) Rui Modesto	Udinese	(Canada) Vancouver Whitecaps	Undisclosed
1 September 2026	(Angola) M'Bala Nzola	Fiorentina	Cagliari	Undisclosed
1 September 2026	(Japan) Yukinari Sugawara	(England) Southampton	Cagliari	Undisclosed
1 September 2026	(Denmark) Oliver Sørensen	Parma	(Scotland) Celtic	Loan
1 September 2026	(Canada) Jonathan David	Juventus	(Spain) Atlético Madrid	Loan
1 September 2026	(Germany) Nick Woltemade	(England) Newcastle	Juventus	Loan
1 September 2026	(France) Youssouf Fofana	Milan	(Spain) Sevilla	Loan
1 September 2026	Kevin Zeroli	Milan	Südtirol	Loan
1 September 2026	(Spain) Iván Azón	Como	(Spain) Getafe	Loan
1 September 2026	(Indonesia) Emil Audero	Como	(Spain) Rayo Vallecano	Loan
1 September 2026	(Austria) Matthias Braunöder	Como	Carrarese	Undisclosed
1 September 2026	(Spain) Robert Sánchez	(England) Chelsea	Como	Loan
1 September 2026	Moise Kean	Fiorentina	Como	Loan
1 September 2026	(Serbia) Petar Ratkov	Lazio	(Spain) Levante	Loan
1 September 2026	(Senegal) Boulaye Dia	Lazio	(France) Rennes	Loan
1 September 2026	(Iceland) Albert Guðmundsson	Fiorentina	Lazio	Loan
1 September 2026	(Morocco) Neil El Aynaoui	Roma	(Germany) RB Leipzig	Loan
1 September 2026	(France) Robinio Vaz	Roma	(England) Hull City	Loan
1 September 2026	(England) Cody Drameh	(England) Hull City	Genoa	Undisclosed
1 September 2026	(Sweden) Jens Cajuste	Napoli	(Spain) Málaga	Loan
1 September 2026	(Sweden) Jesper Lindstrøm	Napoli	(Austria) RB Salzburg	Loan
1 September 2026	(France) Côme Bianay Balcot	Torino	(France) Red Star	Loan
1 September 2026	Tommaso Gabellini	Torino	Forlì	Loan
1 September 2026	Mattia Pellini	Torino	Südtirol	Loan
1 September 2026	(Georgia (country)) Saba Goglichidze	Udinese	Monza	Loan
1 September 2026	(Argentina) Exequiel Zeballos	(Argentina) Boca Juniors	Monza	Undisclosed
1 September 2026	(Guinea-Bissau) Beto	(England) Everton	Fiorentina	Undisclosed
1 September 2026	Wilfried Gnonto	(England) Leeds	Fiorentina	Loan
1 September 2026	Rolando Mandragora	Fiorentina	Torino	Undisclosed
1 September 2026	(Portugal) Pedro Gonçalves	(Portugal) Sporting	Fiorentina	Loan
1 September 2026	Federico Brancolini	Empoli	Novara	Undisclosed
1 September 2026	(Portugal) Daniel Bragança	(Portugal) Sporting	Torino	Loan
1 September 2026	(Scotland) Nathan Patterson	(England) Everton	Torino	Undisclosed
1 September 2026	Federico Cassa	Atalanta	Bologna	Undisclosed
1 September 2026	Federico Cassa	Bologna	Catanzaro	Loan
1 September 2026	(Belgium) Samuel Mbangula	(Germany) Werder Bremen	Bologna	Loan
1 September 2026	(England) Jonathan Rowe	Bologna	Atalanta	Loan
1 September 2026	Nicolò Cavuoti	Cagliari	Catania	Loan
1 September 2026	Roberto Insigne	Avellino	Catania	Undisclosed
1 September 2026	(Germany) Nicolas Kühn	Como	(Germany) Borussia Mönchengladbach	Loan
1 September 2026	(Ghana) Rufai Mohammed	(Sweden) Elfsborg	Venezia	Loan
1 September 2026	(Spain) Toni Fernández	(Spain) Barcelona	Venezia	Loan
1 September 2026	(Ivory Coast) Owen Kouassi	Lecce	(France) Grenoble	Loan
1 September 2026	(France) Solomon Loubao	Monza	Catanzaro	Loan
1 September 2026	(Slovenia) Andrej Pogačar	(Slovenia) Radomlje	Catanzaro	Loan
1 September 2026	(Albania) Ervin Bashi	Catanzaro	Crotone	Loan
2 September 2026	Stephan El Shaarawy	Unattached	Genoa	Free
2 September 2026	(Zambia) Kingstone Mutandwa	Cagliari	(Switzerland) Servette	Loan
2 September 2026	(France) Gady Beyuku	Modena	(England) Blackburn	Undisclosed
3 September 2026	(Switzerland) Ricardo Rodriguez	Unattached	Torino	Free
3 September 2026	(Belgium) Jeremy Mbambi	Pisa	(Belgium) Sint-Truiden	Loan
3 September 2026	(Denmark) Malthe Højholt	Pisa	(Poland) Górnik Zabrze	Undisclosed
3 September 2026	Fabrizio Bagheria	Unattached	Vicenza	Free
3 September 2026	(Nigeria) Kingsley Ehizibue	Unattached	Genoa	Free
3 September 2026	(France) Colin Dagba	Unattached	Carrarese	Free
3 September 2026	Alessio Romagnoli	Lazio	(Qatar) Al Sadd	Undisclosed
4 September 2026	(Greece) Ilias Koutsoupias	Frosinone	(Belgium) Anderlecht	Loan
4 September 2026	Alessandro Fontanarosa	Avellino	(Belgium) Leuven	Loan
4 September 2026	Alberto Paleari	Torino	(Cyprus) AEK Larnaca	Undisclosed
4 September 2026	(England) Tino Anjorin	Torino	(Turkey) Göztepe	Loan
4 September 2026	Gennaro Borrelli	Cagliari	(Turkey) Çaykur Rizespor	Loan
4 September 2026	(Portugal) Pedro Mendes	Modena	(Turkey) Gençlerbirliği	Undisclosed
4 September 2026	(Switzerland) Vincent Sierro	Unattached	Parma	Free
5 September 2026	(France) Yann Karamoh	Unattached	Sampdoria	Free
5 September 2026	(Portugal) Dinis Rodrigues	Napoli	(Spain) Eldense	Loan
7 September 2026	(Switzerland) Junior Ligue	Venezia	(Croatia) Rijeka	Loan
8 September 2026	Edoardo Piana	Udinese	(Slovenia) Koper	Undisclosed
8 September 2026	(Slovenia) David Pejičić	Udinese	(Slovenia) Koper	Loan
8 September 2026	(Portugal) Diogo Leite	Unattached	Lazio	Free
8 September 2026	Andrea Belotti	Unattached	Modena	Free
8 September 2026	Alessandro Pio Riccio	Sampdoria	(Poland) Pogoń Szczecin	Undisclosed
8 September 2026	(Sweden) Jesper Karlsson	Bologna	(Switzerland) Servette	Loan
10 September 2026	(Romania) Ioan Vermeșan	Verona	(Poland) Widzew Łódź	Loan
10 September 2026	Luca Mazzitelli	Unattached	Palermo	Free
14 September 2026	(Morocco) Anass Salah-Eddine	Roma	(Greece) Panathinaikos	Loan
24 September 2026	(Austria) David Alaba	Unattached	Udinese	Free
25 September 2026	Gian Marco Ferrari	Unattached	Arezzo	Free
28 September 2026	(Spain) Patric	Lazio	(United Arab Emirates) Al-Ittifaq	Undisclosed
