= Football at the 2022 Mediterranean Games – Men's team squads =

Below are the squads for the Football at the 2022 Mediterranean Games, hosted in Oran, Algeria, and took place between 26 June and 5 July 2022. Teams were national U18 sides.

== Group A ==
=== Algeria ===
Head coach: Mourad Slatni

No.	Pos.	Player	Date of birth (age)	Caps	Goals	Club
1	GK	Chems Eddine Boumengouche	8 February 2004 (aged 18)	0	0	(Algerian Football Federation) Académie FAF
2	DF	Salah Eddine Zaoui	25 April 2004 (aged 18)	0	0	(Algerian Football Federation) Académie FAF
3	DF	Fouad Hanfoug	23 January 2004 (aged 18)	0	0	(Algerian Football Federation) CR Belouizdad
4	DF	Abdessamed Bounacer	11 December 2004 (aged 17)	0	0	(Algerian Football Federation) USM Alger
5	DF	Ouanis Bouzahzah	7 October 2004 (aged 17)	0	0	(Algerian Football Federation) Académie FAF
6	MF	Abdelghani Lallam	6 July 2004 (aged 17)	0	0	(Algerian Football Federation) Paradou AC
7	MF	Edhy Zuliani (captain)	11 August 2004 (aged 17)	0	0	(French Football Federation) Toulouse FC
8	DF	Mehdi Puch-Herrantz	20 January 2004 (aged 18)	0	0	(French Football Federation) AC Ajaccio
9	DF	Ivane Chegra	3 March 2004 (aged 18)	0	0	(French Football Federation) AC Ajaccio
10	FW	Mohamed Rafik Omar	10 January 2004 (aged 18)	0	0	(Algerian Football Federation) Académie FAF
11	DF	Adam Dougui	2 February 2004 (aged 18)	0	0	(The Football Association) Queens Park Rangers
12	DF	Adam Ghyril Djadi	30 March 2004 (aged 18)	0	0	(French Football Federation) Bourg-en-Bresse
13	MF	Al Amin Aïd	30 September 2004 (aged 17)	0	0	(French Football Federation) Olympique Lyonnais
14	DF	Djibril Nottebaer	28 December 2004 (aged 17)	0	0	(French Football Federation) Amiens SC
15	FW	Lahlou Akhrib	24 April 2005 (aged 17)	0	0	(Algerian Football Federation) JS Kabylie
16	GK	Hamza Boualem	20 September 2004 (aged 17)	0	0	(Algerian Football Federation) USM Alger
17	MF	Mahamed Islam Abdelkader	6 February 2004 (aged 18)	0	0	(Algerian Football Federation) Paradou AC
20	FW	Mohamed Zaid Benmazouz		0	0	(Algerian Football Federation) USM Alger
19	DF	Hamza Moulai		0	0	(Algerian Football Federation) Paradou AC
18	MF	Brahim Bellas	13 March 2004 (aged 18)	0	0	(Algerian Football Federation) CR Belouizdad

=== Morocco ===
Head coach: Mohamed Ouahbi

No.	Pos.	Player	Date of birth (age)	Caps	Goals	Club
	GK	Walid Hasbi	7 January 2004 (age 22)	0	0	(Royal Moroccan Football Federation) Académie Mohammed VI
	GK	Elias Mago	23 March 2004 (age 22)	0	0	(Royal Belgian Football Association) Standard Liège
	DF	Abdessamad Ammal	19 August 2004 (age 21)	0	0	(Royal Moroccan Football Federation) AS FAR
	DF	Ayoub Hammami	1 February 2004 (age 22)	0	0	(Royal Moroccan Football Federation) Académie Mohammed VI
	DF	Ahmed Khatir	14 March 2005 (age 21)	0	0	(Royal Moroccan Football Federation) Académie Mohammed VI
	DF	Wassim Lantaki	17 February 2004 (age 22)	0	0	(French Football Federation) Lille
	MF	Oussama Lyakoubi	23 April 2005 (age 21)	0	0	(Royal Moroccan Football Federation) Académie Mohammed VI
	DF	Anouar Khalid Tamoune	18 June 2004 (age 22)	0	0	(Royal Moroccan Football Federation) AS FAR
	MF	Hamza Anhari	30 January 2004 (age 22)	0	0	(German Football Association) MSV Duisburg
	MF	Usama Arhoun	7 March 2004 (age 22)	0	0	(Royal Spanish Football Federation) Málaga CF
	MF	Abdellah Baallal	7 November 2004 (age 21)	0	0	(Royal Moroccan Football Federation) Académie Mohammed VI
	MF	Othmane Boukhres (captain)	12 September 2004 (age 21)	0	0	(Royal Moroccan Football Federation) AS FAR
	MF	Yassine Khalifi	9 August 2005 (age 20)	0	0	(Royal Moroccan Football Federation) Académie Mohammed VI
	MF	Mohamed Jazouli	4 July 2005 (age 21)	0	0	(Royal Moroccan Football Federation) Académie Mohammed VI
	FW	Youness Akharraz	4 May 2004 (age 22)	0	0	(Royal Moroccan Football Federation) Académie Mohammed VI
	FW	Aïman Maurer	25 September 2004 (age 21)	0	0	(French Football Federation) Clermont Foot
	FW	Abdellah Raihani	3 February 2004 (age 22)	0	0	(Royal Spanish Football Federation) Atlético Madrid
	FW	Omar Sadik	22 March 2004 (age 22)	0	0	(Royal Moroccan Football Federation) Académie Mohammed VI

=== Spain ===
Head coach: Pablo Amo

No.	Pos.	Player	Date of birth (age)	Caps	Goals	Club
	GK	Ander Astralaga	3 March 2004 (age 22)			(Royal Spanish Football Federation) Barcelona
	GK	César Fernández	28 January 2004 (age 22)			(Royal Spanish Football Federation) Celta Vigo
	DF	Álex Valle	25 April 2004 (age 22)			(Royal Spanish Football Federation) Barcelona
	DF	Arnau Casas	15 March 2004 (age 22)			(Royal Spanish Football Federation) Barcelona
	DF	Carlos Alemán	30 September 2004 (age 21)			(Royal Spanish Football Federation) Espanyol
	DF	Cristhian Mosquera	27 June 2004 (age 22)			(Royal Spanish Football Federation) Valencia
	DF	Edgar Pujol	7 August 2004 (age 21)			(Royal Spanish Football Federation) Real Madrid
	DF	Rafael Obrador	24 February 2004 (age 22)			(Royal Spanish Football Federation) Real Madrid
	MF	Álvaro Bastida	12 May 2004 (age 22)			(Royal Spanish Football Federation) Cádiz
	MF	Ismaël Gharbi	10 April 2004 (age 22)			(French Football Federation) Paris Saint-Germain
	MF	Julen Jon Guerrero	14 April 2004 (age 22)			(Royal Spanish Football Federation) Real Madrid
	MF	Manuel Ángel	15 March 2004 (age 22)			(Royal Spanish Football Federation) Real Madrid
	MF	Roger Martínez	5 April 2004 (age 22)			(Royal Spanish Football Federation) Espanyol
	MF	Tomás Mendes	21 November 2004 (age 21)			(Royal Spanish Football Federation) Alavés
	FW	Álvaro Rodríguez	14 July 2004 (age 22)			(Royal Spanish Football Federation) Real Madrid
	FW	Fabio Blanco	18 February 2004 (age 22)			(Royal Spanish Football Federation) Barcelona
	FW	Marcos Denia	23 March 2004 (age 22)			(Royal Spanish Football Federation) Atlético Madrid
	FW	Salim El Jebari	5 February 2004 (age 22)			(Royal Spanish Football Federation) Atlético Madrid

== Group B ==
=== Italy ===
Head coach: Daniele Franceschini

The squad was officially announced on 15 July 2022.

Note: Samuele Vignato was part of the original squad, but was then replaced with Luca D'Andrea due to injury.

No.	Pos.	Player	Date of birth (age)	Club
1	GK	Davide Mastrantonio	16 January 2004 (aged 18)	(Italian Football Federation) Roma
12	GK	Nicola Bagnolini	14 March 2004 (aged 18)	(Italian Football Federation) Bologna
2	DF	Filippo Missori (c)	24 March 2004 (aged 18)	(Italian Football Federation) Roma
3	DF	Iacopo Regonesi	28 March 2004 (aged 18)	(Italian Football Federation) Atalanta
5	DF	Lorenzo Dellavalle	4 April 2004 (aged 18)	(Italian Football Federation) Juventus
6	DF	Gabriele Indragoli	20 February 2004 (aged 18)	(Italian Football Federation) Empoli
13	DF	Andrea Bozzolan	23 February 2004 (aged 18)	(Italian Football Federation) AC Milan
14	DF	Gabriele Guarino	14 April 2004 (aged 18)	(Italian Football Federation) Empoli
4	MF	Andrea Palella	27 June 2004 (aged 17)	(Italian Football Federation) Genoa
7	MF	Luis Hasa	6 January 2004 (aged 18)	(Italian Football Federation) Juventus
8	MF	Justin Kumi	16 July 2004 (aged 17)	(Italian Football Federation) Sassuolo
10	MF	Federico Accornero	5 February 2004 (aged 18)	(Italian Football Federation) Genoa
11	MF	Nicola Patanè	23 March 2004 (aged 18)	(Italian Football Federation) Hellas Verona
15	MF	Lorenzo Amatucci	5 February 2004 (aged 18)	(Italian Football Federation) Fiorentina
16	MF	Lorenzo Ignacchiti	25 April 2004 (aged 18)	(Italian Football Federation) Empoli
9	FW	Tommaso Mancini	23 July 2004 (aged 17)	(Italian Football Federation) Vicenza
17	FW	Luca D'Andrea	6 September 2004 (aged 17)	(Italian Football Federation) Sassuolo
18	FW	Antonio Raimondo	18 March 2004 (aged 18)	(Italian Football Federation) Bologna
