= Mahrous =

Mahrous is a surname. Notable people with the surname include:

- Amir Mahrous (born 1998), Italian football player
- Issam Mahrous, Syrian footballer
- Moataz Mahrous (born 1984), Egyptian footballer
- Nizar Mahrous (born 1963), Syrian footballer and manager
