= Patierno =

Patierno is an Italian surname. Notable people with the surname include:

- Cosimo Patierno (born 1991), Italian footballer
- Francesco Patierno (born 1964), Italian film director

== See also ==
- San Pietro a Patierno
