= Cancellotti =

Cancellotti is an Italian surname. Notable people with the surname include:

- Francesco Cancellotti (born 1963), Italian tennis player
- Gino Cancellotti (1896–1986), Italian architect
- Tommaso Cancellotti (born 1992), Italian footballer
