= Raffaele Russo =

Italian footballer (born 1999)

Personal information
- Date of birth: 25 February 1999 (age 27)
- Place of birth: Capua, Italy
- Height: 1.74 m (5 ft 9 in)
- Position: Forward

Team information
- Current team: Avellino
- Number: 10

Youth career
- –2018: Napoli

Senior career*
Years	Team	Apps	(Gls)
2018–2021	Napoli	0	(0)
2018–2019	→ Albissola (loan)	22	(0)
2019–2020	→ Pro Vercelli (loan)	9	(0)
2020	→ Rieti (loan)	9	(1)
2020–2021	→ Grosseto (loan)	27	(0)
2021–2022	ACR Messina	28	(3)
2022–	Avellino	110	(17)
- * Club domestic league appearances and goals as of 10 May 2026

Raffaele Russo (born 25 February 1999) is an Italian professional footballer who plays as a forward for Serie B club Avellino.

== Career ==
=== Napoli ===
Born in Capua, Russo was a youth exponent of Napoli.

==== Loan to Albissola ====
On 21 July 2018, Russo was signed by Serie C side Albissola on a season-long loan deal. On 19 September, he made his professional debut in Serie C for Albissola, as a substitute, replacing Amir Mahrous in the 71st minute of a 3–2 home defeat against Olbia. On 21 October, he started his first match for Albissola, a 2–0 away defeat against Arezzo, and was replaced by Guido Bennati in the 90th minute. One week later, he played his first entire match, a 1–1 home draw against Pro Patria. On 30 March, Russo was sent off, as a substitute, in the 95th minute of a 1–0 home defeat against Pisa. Russo ended his loan to Albissola with 22 appearances, including 7 as a starter, and 2 assists.

==== Loan to Pro Vercelli ====
After extended his contract for another year of contract, plus two more optionable, on 14 August 2019, Russo was loaned to Serie C club Pro Vercelli on a season-long loan deal. Two weeks later, on 25 August, Russo made his debut for the club as a substitute replacing Matteo Della Morte in the 71st minute of a 2–0 home win over Pianese. However, in January 2020, his loan was terminated by Pro Vercelli and he returned to Napoli leaving the club with only 9 appearances in the league (all as substitute), he also remained an unused substitute for other 6 matches during the loan.

==== Loan to Rieti ====
On 9 January 2020, Russo was signed by Serie C side Rieti on a six-month loan deal. Two days later, on 11 January, he made his debut for the club as a substitute replacing Pasquale De Sarlo in the 62nd minute of a 1–0 home defeat against Picerno. One week later, on 19 January, he played his first entire match for Rieti, a 5–2 away defeat against Bari. On 26 January, he scored his first professional goal for Rieti in the 60th minute of a 1–0 home win over Casertana. Russo ended his loan to Rieti with 9 appearances, 1 goal and 1 assist, however Rieti was relegated in Serie D.

==== Loan to Grosseto ====
On 24 September 2020, he joined newly promoted Serie C club Grosseto. Three days later, on 27 September, he made his debut for the club as a substitute, replacing Filippo Moscati in the 75th minute of a 2–0 away win over Piacenza. On 11 October, Russo played his first match as a starter for Grosseto, a 2–1 away win over Pergolettese, he was replaced by Filippo Boccardi after 54 minutes. On 28 March 2021, Russo played his first entire match for the club, a 1–0 away defeat against Novara. On 25 April, he received a double yellow card and was dismissed in the 42nd minute of a 1–0 away win over Pistoiese. Russo ended his season-long loan to Grosseto with 28 appearances, only 7 of them as a starter, and 1 assist, he also helped the club to reach the play-offs, only to be eliminated by AlbinoLeffe in the second round.

=== Avellino ===
On 11 July 2022, Russo signed a two-year contract with Avellino.

== Career statistics ==
=== Club ===
As of match polayed 16 April 2022

Club	Season	League			Cup		Europe		Other		Total	
Club	Season	League	Apps	Goals	Apps	Goals	Apps	Goals	Apps	Goals	Apps	Goals
Albissola (loan)	2018–19	Serie C	22	0	0	0	—		—		22	0
Pro Vercelli (loan)	2019–20	Serie C	9	0	0	0	—		—		9	0
Rieti (loan)	2019–20	Serie C	9	1	—		—		—		9	1
Grosseto (loan)	2020–21	Serie C	27	0	0	0	—		1 (Note: All appearance(s) in Serie C play-off.)	0	28	0
ACR Messina	2021–22	Serie C	28	3	0	0	—		—		28	3
Career total			95	4	0	0	—		1	0	96	4
