= Alessandro Fontanarosa =

Italian footballer (born 2003)

Personal information
- Full name: Alessandro Fontanarosa
- Date of birth: 7 February 2003 (age 23)
- Place of birth: San Gennaro Vesuviano, Italy
- Height: 1.89 m (6 ft 2 in)
- Position: Centre-back

Team information
- Current team: Oud-Heverlee Leuven (on loan from Avellino)
- Number: 30

Youth career
- –2018: Sampdoria
- 2018–2019: Empoli
- 2019–2022: Inter

Senior career*
Years	Team	Apps	(Gls)
2022–2025	Inter	0	(0)
2023–2024	→ Cosenza (loan)	21	(0)
2024–2025	→ Reggiana (loan)	10	(0)
2025	→ Carrarese (loan)	5	(0)
2025	Inter U23	0	(0)
2025–	Avellino	25	(0)
2026–	→ OH Leuven (loan)	1	(0)

International career^{‡}
2019	Italy U16	4	(0)
2019	Italy U17	3	(0)
2021	Italy U18	1	(0)
2021–2022	Italy U19	10	(0)
2022–2023	Italy U20	13	(0)
2024–	Italy U21	1	(0)
Medal record
Men's football
Representing Italy
FIFA U-20 World Cup
Runner-up	2023 Argentina
- * Club domestic league appearances and goals as of 27 October 2026 ‡ National team caps and goals as of 12 June 2024

Alessandro Fontanarosa (born 7 February 2003) is an Italian professional footballer who plays as a centre-back for Belgian Pro League club Oud-Heverlee Leuven, on loan from Serie B club Avellino.

== Club career ==
Having previously played for Sampdoria, Fontanarosa joined Empoli's youth academy in 2018.

In August 2019, he joined Inter for an estimated fee of €750,000. After featuring for the under-17 team, he made his debut for the under-19 team in February 2020. In the following season, Fontanarosa became a regular starter for Inter's under-19 team, as he helped them win the Campionato Primavera 1, the Coppa Italia Primavera and the Supercoppa Primavera. He also played in the 2020–21 UEFA Youth League, scoring one goal in six appearances.

At the start of the 2022–23 season, Fontanarosa was promoted to Inter's first team. He went on to feature on the bench for several Serie A and UEFA Champions League matches.

On 9 August 2023, Fontanarosa went to Cosenza on loan.

On 27 August 2024, Fontanarosa joined Serie B club Reggiana on a season-long loan. On 3 February 2025, Fontanrosa joined fellow Serie B side Carrarese on loan for the remainder of the season.

In the summer of 2025, Fontanarosa initially returned to Inter and was assigned to their newly established reserve team, Inter Under-23, before making a permanent move to Serie B side Avellino on 20 August.

== International career ==
Fontanarosa has represented Italy at various youth levels. He made his debut for the under-17 team on 7 September 2019, in a friendly match against Turkey national under-17 football team. He also played for the under-18 team and the under-19 team.

In May 2023, he was included by head coach Carmine Nunziata in the Italian squad that took part in the FIFA U-20 World Cup in Argentina, where the Azzurrini finished runners-up after losing to Uruguay in the final match.

== Career statistics ==
As of match played 31 August 2025

Appearances and goals by club, season and competition
Club	Season	League			National cup		Europe		Other		Total	
Club	Season	Division	Apps	Goals	Apps	Goals	Apps	Goals	Apps	Goals	Apps	Goals
Cosenza (loan)	2023–24	Serie B	21	0	0	0	—		—		21	0
Reggiana (loan)	2024–25	Serie B	10	0	—		—		—		10	0
Carrarese (loan)	2024–25	Serie B	5	0	—		—		—		5	0
Inter Milan U23	2025–26	Serie C	0	0	—		—		1 (Note: Appearance in Coppa Italia Serie C)	0	1	0
Avellino	2025–26	Serie B	1	0	—		—		—		1	0
Career total			37	0	0	0	0	0	1	0	38	0

== Honours ==
Italy U20

- FIFA U-20 World Cup runner-up: 2023
