= Patrick Enrici =

Italian footballer (born 2001)

Personal information
- Date of birth: 2 May 2001 (age 25)
- Place of birth: Cuneo, Italy
- Height: 1.83 m (6 ft 0 in)
- Position: Centre back

Team information
- Current team: Avellino
- Number: 56

Youth career
- –2011: AC Pedona
- 2011–2018: Cuneo
- 2016–2017: → Pro Vercelli (loan)
- 2017–2018: → Torino (loan)
- 2018–2020: Torino

Senior career*
Years	Team	Apps	(Gls)
2020–2021	Sambenedettese	26	(0)
2021–2023	Lecco	68	(1)
2023–2024	Taranto	24	(1)
2024–	Avellino	60	(4)
- * Club domestic league appearances and goals as of 10 May 2026

Patrick Enrici (born 2 May 2001) is an Italian professional footballer who plays as a centre back for the Serie B club Avellino.

== Club career ==
Trained in Cuneo and Torino youth system, Enrici was signed by the Serie C club Sambenedettese for the 2020–21 season. He made his professional debut on 27 September 2020 against Carpi.

On 7 July 2021, he joined Lecco.

On 21 August 2023, Enrici signed a two-year contract with Taranto.

On 29 August 2024, Enrici moved to Avellino on a three-year deal.
