= Julen Jon Guerrero =

Spanish footballer

Personal information
- Full name: Julen Jon Guerrero Landabaso
- Date of birth: 14 April 2004 (age 22)
- Place of birth: Bilbao, Spain
- Height: 1.86 m (6 ft 1 in)
- Position: Attacking midfielder

Team information
- Current team: Arenteiro
- Number: 16

Youth career
- 2011–2017: Málaga
- 2017–2023: Real Madrid
- 2023–2024: → Roma (loan)

Senior career*
Years	Team	Apps	(Gls)
2023–2024	Real Madrid B	0	(0)
2023	→ Amorebieta (loan)	17	(4)
2024–2025	Alavés B	28	(4)
2024	→ Amorebieta (loan)	8	(0)
2025–	Arenteiro	8	(0)

International career
2018–2019	Spain U15	7	(4)
2019–2020	Spain U16	10	(2)
2021–2022	Spain U18	13	(7)
- * Club domestic league appearances and goals as of 30 November 2025

Julen Jon Guerrero Landabaso (born 14 April 2004) is a Spanish professional footballer who plays as an attacking midfielder for Primera Federación club Arenteiro.

== Club career ==
=== Real Madrid ===
Born in Bilbao, Spain, Guerrero started his career at Málaga, before joining Real Madrid in 2017. Despite being a midfielder, he has amassed an impressive goal tally for Los Blancos youth teams, notable scoring in eight consecutive games in the 2020/21 season.

Due to his father's legendary status at Athletic Bilbao, Guerrero has found himself constantly linked with the Biscay club. In October 2021, he was included in The Guardian's "Next Generation" list for 2021 - highlighting the best young players in the world.

On 12 January 2023, Guerrero was loaned to Primera Federación side SD Amorebieta for the remainder of the season. He made his senior debut ten days later, coming on as a late substitute for Rayco Rodríguez in a 3–2 away win over CD Numancia.

Guerrero scored his first senior goal on 12 February 2023, netting the Azules' equalizer in a 1–1 draw at FC Barcelona Atlètic. He scored a further three times for the club as they achieved promotion to Segunda División.

In July 2023, Real Madrid sent Guerrero on loan with an option-to-buy to Serie A club Roma's youth sector. In January 2024, after failing to break into the first team under José Mourinho, Guerrero's loan was terminated.

=== Alavés ===
On 11 January 2024, after his loan spell at Roma was cancelled, Guerrero left Real Madrid and signed a contract until 2025 with Basque club Alavés, initially joining the side's B team, competing in the Segunda Federación. Real Madrid reportedly kept 50% of his economic rights.

On 30 August 2024, Guerrero returned to Amorebieta on loan from Alavés. Back to Alavés B in January 2025, he left the club on 24 June of that year.

== International career ==
Guerrero has represented Spain at under-15, under-16 and under-18 level. His under-18 international career got off to an explosive start; having scored a hat-trick against Turkey, he followed this up with a goal against Romania.

== Personal life ==
Guerrero is the son of former Spanish international footballer, and Athletic Bilbao legend, Julen Guerrero, and the nephew of José Félix Guerrero.

== Honours ==
Amorebieta

- Primera Federación: 2022–23 (Group 2 and overall champion)
