= Justin Kumi =

Italian footballer (born 2004)

Personal information
- Date of birth: 16 July 2004 (age 22)
- Place of birth: Castelfranco Veneto, Italy
- Position: Midfielder

Team information
- Current team: Juve Stabia (on loan from Sassuolo)
- Number: 24

Youth career
- –2012: Treville
- 2012–2018: Giorgione
- 2018–2024: Sassuolo

Senior career*
Years	Team	Apps	(Gls)
2022–	Sassuolo	4	(0)
2025	→ Reggiana (loan)	8	(0)
2025–2026	→ Avellino (loan)	19	(1)
2026–	→ Juve Stabia (loan)	0	(0)

International career^{‡}
2021–2022	Italy U18	11	(0)
2022–2023	Italy U19	8	(1)
Medal record
Representing Italy
Mediterranean Games
Runner-up	Oran 2022	U-18 Team
- * Club domestic league appearances and goals as of 23 August 2026 ‡ National team caps and goals as of 28 March 2023

Justin Kumi (born 16 July 2004) is an Italian professional footballer who plays as a midfielder for Serie B club Juve Stabia, on loan from Sassuolo.

== Life and club career ==
Kumi was born on 16 July 2004 in Castelfranco Veneto, Italy. He is of Ghanaian descent. As a youth player, he joined the youth academy of his hometown side in Italy (Treville). After that, he joined the youth academy of Italian side Giorgione at the age of fifteen. After that, he joined the youth academy of Serie A side Sassuolo. In 2023, he received interest from La Liga side Barcelona and Eredivisie side PSV. He was regarded as one of the under-19 team's most important players as they won the league during the 2023/24 season. Kumi started his senior career with Italian Serie A side Sassuolo. On 28 February 2024, he debuted for the club during a 1–6 loss to Napoli.

On 15 January 2025, Kumi moved on loan to Reggiana.

On 8 July 2025, Kumi was loaned by Avellino.

== International career ==
Kumi is an Italy youth international. He played for the Italy national under-18 team at the 2022 Mediterranean Games. He has also played for the Italy national under-19 team. He is eligible to represent Ghana internationally through his parents.

== Style of play ==
Kumi mainly operates as a midfielder. He has been described as a "box-to-box midfielder". He has received comparisons to France international Adrien Rabiot. He is known for his versatility. He is also known for his strength.
