= Giuseppe Panico =

Italian footballer, born 1997

Personal information
- Full name: Giuseppe Antonio Panico
- Date of birth: 10 May 1997 (age 29)
- Place of birth: Ottaviano, Italy
- Height: 1.78 m (5 ft 10 in)
- Position: Striker

Team information
- Current team: Foggia
- Number: 17

Youth career
- –2015: Genoa

Senior career*
Years	Team	Apps	(Gls)
2014–2018	Genoa	2	(0)
2016–2018	→ Cesena (loan)	24	(0)
2018	→ Teramo (loan)	8	(0)
2018–2020	Cittadella	47	(7)
2020–2021	Novara	35	(5)
2021–2022	Juve Stabia	20	(1)
2022	Pro Vercelli	18	(4)
2022–2024	Crotone	7	(0)
2023	→ Lucchese (loan)	16	(5)
2023–2024	→ Carrarese (loan)	35	(10)
2024–2025	Carrarese	15	(0)
2025	→ Avellino (loan)	14	(1)
2025–2026	Avellino	2	(0)
2026	→ Ternana (loan)	12	(1)
2026–	Foggia	0	(0)

International career^{‡}
2013–2014	Italy U17	14	(8)
2014–2015	Italy U18	3	(0)
2014–2016	Italy U19	18	(4)
2016–2017	Italy U20	16	(3)
Medal record
Men's football
Representing Italy
FIFA U-20 World Cup
Third place	2017 South Korea
UEFA European Under-19 Championship
Runner-up	2016 Germany
- * Club domestic league appearances and goals as of 30 April 2026 ‡ National team caps and goals as of 14 November 2017

Giuseppe Antonio Panico (born 10 May 1997) is an Italian professional footballer who plays as a striker for Serie C Group C club Foggia.

== Club career ==
Panico is a youth exponent from Genoa. He made his Serie A debut on 31 May 2015 against Sassuolo, where he replaced Maxime Lestienne after 81 minutes; the game ended in a 3–1 away defeat for Genoa.

On 30 June 2016 Panico was loaned to Cesena for a period of two years. He then joined Cittadella on 13 July 2018. Continuing his career, Panico signed a contract with Novara on 1 September 2020.

In the following year, he moved to Juve Stabia on 12 August 2021, and later joined Pro Vercelli on 18 January 2022.

Panico signed a three-year contract with FC Crotone on 19 July 2022. He was then loaned to Lucchese on 12 January 2023. As of 11 July 2023, Panico has been moved to Carrarese, on loan with an obligation to buy.

On 7 January 2025, Panico moved to Avellino on loan with an obligation to buy in case of promotion to Serie B.

== International career ==
He represented Italy national under-19 football team at the 2016 UEFA European Under-19 Championship, in which Italy was the runner-up and played in every game except the final.

A year later, he played for Italy at the 2017 FIFA U-20 World Cup, scoring two goals and the decisive penalty shoot-out kick that brought Italy 3rd place over Uruguay.

== Honours ==
Italy U19

- UEFA European Under-19 Championship runner-up: 2016

Italy U20

- FIFA U-20 World Cup third place: 2017
