= Andréa Le Borgne =

French footballer (born 2006)

Personal information
- Date of birth: 27 July 2006 (age 20)
- Place of birth: Neuilly-sur-Seine, France
- Height: 1.89 m (6 ft 2 in)
- Position: Central midfielder

Team information
- Current team: Hellas Verona (on loan from Como)
- Number: 17

Youth career
- 2012–2015: Stade Marseillais UC
- 2015–2018: Marseille
- 2018–2019: ASPTT Marseille
- 2019–2021: Air Bel
- 2021–2024: Nice
- 2024–2025: Air Bel
- 2025: Como

Senior career*
Years	Team	Apps	(Gls)
2025–	Como	1	(0)
2026	→ Avellino (loan)	11	(0)
2026–	→ Hellas Verona (loan)	1	(0)

International career^{‡}
2025–	France U20	6	(3)
- * Club domestic league appearances and goals as of 23 August 2026 ‡ National team caps and goals as of 18 October 2025

Andréa Le Borgne (born 27 July 2006) is a French professional footballer who plays as a central midfielder for Serie B club Hellas Verona, on loan from Como.

== Club career ==
As a youth player, Le Borgne joined the youth academy of Ligue 1 side OGC Nice. Ahead of the 2024–25 season, he joined the youth academy of French side SC Aubagne Air Bel.

=== Como ===
Following his stint there, he joined the youth academy of Serie A side Como in 2025 and was promoted to the club's senior team the same year.

==== Loan to Avellino ====
On 2 February 2026, Le Borgne was joined Serie B club Avellino on a season-long loan.

==== Loan to Verona ====
On 14 August 2026, Le Borgne joined Verona on a loan with an option and counter-option to buy.

== International career ==
Le Borgne is a France youth international. During September and October 2025, he played for the France national under-20 football team at the 2025 FIFA U-20 World Cup.

== Style of play ==
Le Borgne plays as a midfielder. Italian news website MondoPrimavera wrote in 2025 that he "is a complete central midfielder, capable of operating both in front of the defense and as a box-to-box midfielder. Standing 189 centimeters tall, he combines physicality and technique, ensuring a balanced defense and attack".
