= Amir Mahrous =

Italian footballer (born 1998)

Personal information
- Date of birth: 23 January 1998 (age 28)
- Place of birth: Savona, Italy
- Height: 1.74 m (5 ft 9 in)
- Position: Defender

Youth career
- –2017: Genoa

Senior career*
Years	Team	Apps	(Gls)
2017–2019	Genoa	0	(0)
2017–2018	→ Robur Siena (loan)	7	(0)
2018–2019	→ Albissola (loan)	21	(0)
2019–2022	Vibonese	71	(0)
- * Club domestic league appearances and goals as of 24 April 2022

Amir Mahrous (born 23 January 1998) is an Italian football player.

== Club career ==
He made his Serie C debut for Robur Siena on 20 December 2017 in a game against Cuneo.

On 10 August 2019, he signed a one-year contract with Vibonese.
