= Matteo Della Morte =

Italian football player

Personal information
- Date of birth: 13 October 1999 (age 27)
- Place of birth: Cirié, Italy
- Height: 1.70 m (5 ft 7 in)
- Position: Midfielder

Team information
- Current team: Bari

Youth career
- –2014: Juventus
- 2014–2015: J-Stars
- 2015–2018: Pro Vercelli

Senior career*
Years	Team	Apps	(Gls)
2017–2023	Pro Vercelli	104	(20)
2018–2019	→ Paganese (loan)	17	(0)
2023–2026	Vicenza	81	(12)
2025–2026	→ Benevento (loan)	29	(1)
2026–	Bari	0	(0)
- * Club domestic league appearances and goals as of 29 August 2026

Matteo Della Morte (born 13 October 1999) is an Italian professional footballer who plays as a midfielder for Serie C Group C club Bari.

== Club career ==
He made his Serie B debut for Pro Vercelli on 2 December 2017 in a game against Parma.

On 30 January 2023, Della Morte signed a 3.5-year contract with Vicenza.

On 15 July 2025, Della Morte was loaned to Benevento, with an option to buy and a conditional obligation to buy.

== Personal life ==
His father is the former footballer Ivano Della Morte.
