= Andrea Cagnano =

Italian footballer (born 1998)

Personal information
- Date of birth: 17 June 1998 (age 28)
- Place of birth: Cantù, Italy
- Height: 1.82 m (6 ft 0 in)
- Position: Left back

Team information
- Current team: Arezzo
- Number: 32

Youth career
- Inter Milan

Senior career*
Years	Team	Apps	(Gls)
2017–2019	Inter Milan	0	(0)
2017–2018	→ Santarcangelo (loan)	13	(1)
2018	→ Pisa (loan)	3	(0)
2018–2019	→ Pistoiese (loan)	35	(0)
2019–2021	Novara	58	(2)
2021–2023	Como	39	(0)
2023–2025	Südtirol	25	(0)
2025	→ Avellino (loan)	12	(1)
2025–2026	Avellino	8	(0)
2026	→ Pescara (loan)	12	(1)
2026–	Arezzo	0	(0)
- * Club domestic league appearances and goals as of 20 July 2026

Andrea Cagnano (born 17 June 1998) is an Italian professional footballer who plays as a left back for Serie B club Arezzo.

== Club career ==
=== Inter Milan ===
Born in Cantù, Cagnano was a youth exponent of Inter.

==== Loan to Santarcangelo and Pisa ====
On 19 July 2017, Canano with Riccardo Gaiola were signed by Serie C side Santarcangelo on a season-long loan deal. On 3 September he made his professional debut in a 2–1 away win over Gubbio, he played the entire match. On 26 November, Cagnano scored his first professional goal, as a substitute, in the 74th minute of a 2–1 home defeat against FeralpiSalò. In January 2018, Cagnano returned to Inter leaving Santarcangelo with 13 appearances and 1 goal.

On 31 January 2018, Cagnano was loaned to Serie C club Pisa for the second part of the season. On 20 March he made his debut for Pisa as a substitute replacing Maikol Negro in the 90th minute of a 1–0 away win over Pistoiese. Four days later, on 24 March, Cagnano played his first match as a starter in a 2–0 home defeat against Carrarese, and four more days later he played his first entire match for Pisa, a 1–0 away defeat against Arezzo. Cagnano ended his 6-month loan to Pisa with only this 3 appearances.

==== Loan to Pistoiese ====
On 5 July 2018, Cagnano was loaned to Serie C club Pistoiese on a season-long loan deal. On 29 July he made his debut for Pistoiese in a 1–0 away defeat against Juve Stabia in the first round of Coppa Italia, he was replaced by Francesco Cerretelli in the 84th minute. On 16 September he made his Serie C debut for Pistoiese in a 2–1 away defeat against Pro Patria, he was replaced by Emmanuel Latte Lath in the 69th minute. One week later, on 26 September, he played his first entire match for Pistoiese, a 3–3 away draw against Pro Piacenza. On 16 March 2019, Cagnano was sent-off with a red card in the 91st minute of a 1–0 away defeat against Piacenza. Cagnano ended his season-long loan to Pistoiese with 36 appearances and 2 assists.

=== Novara ===
On 19 July 2019, Cagnano signed for Serie C club Novara on an undisclosed fee and a 3-year contract. On 26 August he made his debut for the club in a 2–0 home win over Juventus U23, he played the entire match. He became Novara's first-choice early in the season, he was replaced for the first time by Pablo Gonzàles in the 87th minute of his ninth appearance in a 2–1 away defeat against Giana Erminio. On 19 January 2020, Cagnano scored his first goal for the club in the 28th minute of a 3–2 away defeat against Lecco. In his first season at Novara he also helps the club to reach the play-off, but Novara lose 2–1 against Reggio Audace in the semi-finals. On 21 October he scored his second goal for the club in the 46th minute of a 3–2 away win over Livorno.

=== Como ===
On 17 August 2021, he signed a two-years contract with Como.

=== Südtirol ===
On 18 July 2023, he signed a three-years contract with Südtirol on loan. On 31 January 2025, Cagnano moved on loan to Avellino, with a conditional obligation to buy.

=== Avellino ===
==== Loan to Pescara ====
On 2 February 2026, Cagnano was loaned by Pescara in Serie B.

== Career statistics ==
=== Club ===
As of 18 May 2021

Club	Season	League			Cup		Europe		Other		Total	
Club	Season	League	Apps	Goals	Apps	Goals	Apps	Goals	Apps	Goals	Apps	Goals
Santarcangelo (loan)	2017–18	Serie C	13	1	0	0	—		—		13	1
Pisa (loan)	2017–18	Serie C	3	0	—		—		—		3	0
Pistoiese (loan)	2018–19	Serie C	35	0	1	0	—		—		36	0
Novara	2019–20	Serie C	24	1	0	0	—		4 (Note: All appearance(s) in Serie C play-off.)	0	28	1
Novara	2020–21	Serie C	30	1	2	0	—		—		32	1
Career total			105	3	3	0	—		4	0	112	3

== Honours ==
=== Club ===
Inter Primavera

- Campionato Nazionale Primavera: 2016–17
