= Tommaso Cancellotti =

Italian footballer

Personal information
- Date of birth: 22 May 1992 (age 34)
- Place of birth: Gubbio, Italy
- Height: 1.85 m (6 ft 1 in)
- Position: Defender

Team information
- Current team: Avellino
- Number: 29

Youth career
- Gubbio
- 2009–2011: Sampdoria

Senior career*
Years	Team	Apps	(Gls)
2009–2011	Sampdoria	0	(0)
2009–2010	→ Sestese (loan)	19	(0)
2011–2014	Pro Vercelli	41	(0)
2013	→ Gubbio (loan)	11	(0)
2014–2017	Juve Stabia	106	(2)
2017–2018	Brescia	21	(0)
2018–2019	Cittadella	21	(0)
2019–2020	Teramo	30	(2)
2020–2021	Perugia	19	(0)
2021–2023	Pescara	63	(4)
2023–	Avellino	102	(1)
- * Club domestic league appearances and goals as of 10 May 2026

Tommaso Cancellotti (born 22 May 1992) is an Italian footballer who plays as a defender for Serie B club Avellino.

== Career ==
Born in Gubbio, Umbria, Cancellotti started his career at Gubbio. In June 2009, he joined U.C. Sampdoria for €45,000. In July 2011, Cancellotti and Alberto Masi were farmed to Pro Vercelli in a co-ownership deal for a peppercorn of €500 each. Cancellotti followed the club promoted to 2012–13 Serie B. On 25 January 2013, Cancellotti returned to Gubbio.

Cancellotti made his Serie B debut on 15 September 2012 against Sassuolo.

On 18 July 2019, he signed a two-year contract with Teramo.

On 28 September 2020, Cancellotti moved to Perugia.

On 4 August 2021, he joined Pescara.

On 7 July 2023, Cancellotti signed a two-year contract with Avellino.
