= Giovanni Daffara =

Italian footballer (born 2004)

Personal information
- Full name: Giovanni Daffara
- Date of birth: 5 December 2004 (age 21)
- Place of birth: Biella, Italy
- Height: 1.94 m (6 ft 4 in)
- Position: Goalkeeper

Team information
- Current team: Parma
- Number: 30

Youth career
- Biellese
- 2020–2023: Juventus

Senior career*
Years	Team	Apps	(Gls)
2023–2026	Juventus Next Gen	74	(0)
2025–2026	→ Avellino (loan)	25	(0)
2026–	Parma	0	(0)

International career^{‡}
2026–	Italy U21	1	(0)
- * Club domestic league appearances and goals as of 19:09, 3 June 2026 (UTC) ‡ National team caps and goals as of 23:45, 16 November 2026 (UTC)

Giovanni Daffara (born 5 December 2004) is an Italian professional footballer who plays as a goalkeeper for Serie A club Parma.

== Club career ==
=== Juventus ===
Born in Biella, Italy, Daffara began his youth career at local club Biellese, where he was spotted at the age of 15 by Juventus' scout Luigi Milani. He joined Juventus' youth ranks in 2020 and progressed through every age group at the club. Daffara made his senior debut for the reserve team Juventus Next Gen on 12 March 2023, going on to become the side's first-choice goalkeeper, making 49 appearances in Serie C and the promotion play-offs. In August 2024, he renewed his contract with Juventus until June 2028. In 2022–23, he also represented the Juventus U19 side in the UEFA Youth League, making five appearances. He made Juventus' side for the 2025 FIFA Club World Cup.

==== Loan to Avellino ====
In July 2025, Daffara joined Serie B club Avellino on a season-long loan. He initially served as understudy to veteran goalkeeper Antony Iannarilli, before taking advantage of an injury to the 35-year-old to earn his opportunity, making his first appearance on 28 October 2025 against Pescara. He went on to make 25 appearances in Serie B, and cemented himself as one of the most highly regarded young goalkeepers in Italy's second tier, noted for his explosive athleticism and shot-stopping ability. In one notable performance against Venezia on 9 December 2025, he produced at least five high-difficulty saves to secure a point for his side, earning widespread praise. In another outing against Empoli on 2 May 2026, he saved a penalty from Stiven Shpendi and, when a retake was ordered, denied the striker once more.

=== Parma ===
On 1 July 2026, he transferred to Serie A side Parma on a contract until 2031.

== International career ==
Daffara has been called up to the Italy U21s. In May 2026, he received his first call-up to the senior Italy squad by interim manager Silvio Baldini, for friendly matches against Luxembourg and Greece. He was named alongside Gianluigi Donnarumma and Lorenzo Palmisani as one of three goalkeepers in the squad. His call-up was also historically significant for his club Avellino, as it marked the first time a player representing the club had been called up to the senior Italian national team in 40 years, since Fernando De Napoli in 1986.

== Career statistics ==
=== Club ===
As of match played 1 May 2026

Appearances and goals by club, season and competition
Club	Season	League			National cup		Europe		Other		Total	
Club	Season	Division	Apps	Goals	Apps	Goals	Apps	Goals	Apps	Goals	Apps	Goals
Juventus Next Gen	2021–22	Serie C	0	0	0	0	—		—		0	0
Juventus Next Gen	2022–23	Serie C	7	0	1	0	—		—		8	0
Juventus Next Gen	2023–24	Serie C	35	0	0	0	—		6	0	41	0
Juventus Next Gen	2024–25	Serie C	32	0	0	0	—		2	0	34	0
Juventus Next Gen	Total		74	0	1	0	—		8	0	83	0
Juventus	2023–24	Serie A	0	0	0	0	—		—		0	0
Juventus	2024–25	Serie A	0	0	0	0	0	0	0	0	0	0
Juventus	Total		0	0	0	0	0	0	0	0	0	0
Avellino (loan)	2025–26	Serie B	25	0	0	0	—		0	0	25	0
Parma	2026–27	Serie A	0	0	0	0	—		—		0	0
Career total			99	0	1	0	0	0	8	0	108	0
