= Filippo Missori =

Italian footballer (born 2004)

Personal information
- Date of birth: 24 March 2004 (age 22)
- Place of birth: Rome, Italy
- Height: 1.82 m (6 ft 0 in)
- Position: Right-back

Team information
- Current team: Avellino (on loan from Sassuolo)
- Number: 2

Youth career
- Romulea
- 2013–2021: Roma

Senior career*
Years	Team	Apps	(Gls)
2021–2023	Roma	3	(0)
2023–	Sassuolo	12	(0)
2025–2026	→ Avellino (loan)	31	(2)
2026–	→ Avellino (loan)	3	(0)

International career^{‡}
2019	Italy U15	9	(2)
2019–2020	Italy U16	7	(0)
2021–2022	Italy U18	12	(0)
2022–2023	Italy U19	13	(1)
2023–2024	Italy U20	4	(1)
Medal record
Men's football
Representing Italy
UEFA European Under-19 Championship
Winner	2023 Malta
Mediterranean Games
Runner-up	Oran 2022	U-18 Team
- * Club domestic league appearances and goals as of 19 September 2026 ‡ National team caps and goals as of 21 March 2024

Filippo Missori (born 24 March 2004) is an Italian professional footballer who plays as a right-back for Serie B club Avellino on loan from Sassuolo.

== Club career ==
=== Roma ===
Missori started his career in Romulea—a club from the Italian capital—before joining Roma in 2013. Having won the national scudetto with both the under-15 and the under-17 in Rome, he made his first appearance in the professional squad under José Mourinho on 24 October 2021, figuring on the team sheet for a Serie A game against Napoli, along with his Primavera teammate Felix Afena-Gyan.

Missori made his professional debut for Roma on 25 November 2021, replacing Henrikh Mkhitaryan for the last 10 minutes of a 4–0 home victory over Zorya Luhansk in the UEFA Conference League. By doing so, he became the first footballer born in 2004 to play for Roma, or for any Italian club in a European competition. On 10 July 2022, he officially renewed his contract with the club until 2026.

During the 2022–23 season, Missori was part of Roma's under-19 squad that won the Coppa Italia Primavera. On 6 May 2023, he made his Serie A debut, coming on as a substitute for Nemanja Matić in injury time of a 2–0 home loss to Inter. On 14 May, he made his first professional start in a goalless league draw against Bologna.

=== Sassuolo ===
On 29 June 2023, Missori joined Serie A club Sassuolo, together with team-mate Cristian Volpato, for a cumulative €10 million transfer fee, plus a 15% sell-on clause in favor of Roma for both of the players.

He made his debut for the club on 20 August, coming on as a second-half substitute for Matías Viña in a 2–0 home league defeat to Atalanta. He went on to make eight league appearances throughout the season, as Sassuolo was eventually relegated to Serie B after eleven years in the top-flight.

==== Loans to Avellino ====
On 29 August 2025, Missori was loaned to Serie B club Avellino. After returning from the loan, Missori appeared for Sassuolo in a cup game, but remained on the bench in the first two games of the 2026–27 Serie A season. On 31 August 2026, he returned to Avellino on a new loan, with an option to buy.

== International career ==
A youth international for Italy since the under-15, Missori became the captain of the under-18 selection in 2021. He was included in the under-18 squad that took part in the 2022 Mediterranean Games in Oran, Algeria, with the Azzurrini eventually winning the silver medal after losing 1–0 against France in the final match. In December 2022, he was involved in a training camp led by the Italian senior national team's manager, Roberto Mancini, and aimed to the most promising national talents.

In June 2023, he was included in the Italian under-19 squad for the UEFA European Under-19 Championship in Malta, where the Azzurrini eventually won their second continental title.

== Career statistics ==
=== Club ===
As of match played 26 May 2024

Appearances and goals by club, season and competition
Club	Season	League			Coppa Italia		Continental		Other		Total	
Club	Season	Division	Apps	Goals	Apps	Goals	Apps	Goals	Apps	Goals	Apps	Goals
Roma	2021–22	Serie A	0	0	0	0	1 (Note: Appearance(s) in UEFA Europa Conference League)	0	—		1	0
Roma	2022–23	Serie A	3	0	0	0	0	0	—		3	0
Roma	Total		3	0	0	0	1	0	—		4	0
Sassuolo	2023–24	Serie A	8	0	3	0	—		—		11	0
Career total			11	0	3	0	1	0	0	0	15	0

== Honours ==
Roma

- UEFA Europa Conference League: 2021–22

Italy U19

- UEFA European Under-19 Championship: 2023

Roma U19

- Coppa Italia Primavera: 2022–23

Sassuolo

- Serie B: 2024–25

Individual

- UEFA European Under-19 Championship Team of the Tournament: 2023
