= Cosimo Patierno =

Italian footballer (born 1991)

Personal information
- Date of birth: 1 March 1991 (age 35)
- Place of birth: Bitonto, Italy
- Height: 1.85 m (6 ft 1 in)
- Position: Striker

Team information
- Current team: Casarano
- Number: 90

Senior career*
Years	Team	Apps	(Gls)
2009–2010	Vigevano	24	(1)
2010–2011	Leonessa Altamura	24	(14)
2011	Martina	5	(1)
2012	Terlizzi	12	(4)
2012–2014	Teramo		
2014–2015	Bisceglie	42	(17)
2016	Grosseto	11	(3)
2016	FBC Gravina	11	(1)
2017	Nardò	16	(13)
2017–2021	Bitonto	83	(57)
2021–2023	Virtus Francavilla	53	(28)
2023–2026	Avellino	79	(36)
2026–	Casarano	1	(2)
- * Club domestic league appearances and goals as of 28 August 2026

Cosimo Patierno (born 1 March 1991) is an Italian footballer who plays as a striker for Serie C Group C club Casarano.

== Life and career ==
Patierno started his career with Italian side Vigevano. In 2010, he signed for Italian side Leonessa Altamura. In 2011, he signed for Italian side Martina. In 2012, he signed for Italian side ASD Real Olimpia Terlizzi. After that, he signed for Italian side Teramo. In 2014, he signed for Italian side Bisceglie. In 2016, he signed for Italian side Grosseto.

After that, he signed for Italian side FBC Gravina. In 2017, he signed for Italian side Nardò. After that, he signed for Italian side Bitonto. In 2021, he signed for Italian side Virtus Francavilla. In 2023, Patierno signed for Italian side Avellino. He was regarded as one of the club's most important players.

Patierno was born on 1 March 1991 in Italy. He is a native of Bitonto, Italy. He has been married. He has been nicknamed "Kikko".
