= 2026–27 Inter Milan season =

Inter Milan
2026–27 season
- Chairman: Giuseppe Marotta
- Head coach: Cristian Chivu
- Stadium: San Siro
- Serie A: 2nd
- Coppa Italia: Round of 16
- Supercoppa Italiana: Final
- UEFA Champions League: League phase
- Top goalscorer: League: Marcus Thuram (6); All: Lautaro Martínez; Marcus Thuram (6 each)
- Highest home attendance: 77,593 v Como; 8 November 2026 (Serie A)
- Lowest home attendance: 73,705 v Udinese; 14 September 2026 (Serie A)
- Average home league attendance: 75,214
- Biggest win: 4–1 v Monza; 22 August 2026 (Serie A); 3–0 v Parma; 10 October 2026 (Serie A); 3–0 v Feyenoord; 3 November 2026 (Champions League)
- Biggest defeat: 1–3 v Milan; 31 October 2026 (Serie A)
Home colours	Away colours	Third colours
- All statistics correct as of 8 November 2026.

The 2026–27 season is the 119th season in the existence of Inter Milan, which have all been played in the top division of Italian football. In addition to the domestic league, Inter is participating in this season's editions of the Coppa Italia, the Supercoppa Italiana and the UEFA Champions League.

== Kits ==
Supplier: Nike / Front sponsor: Betsson.sport / Back sponsor: U-Power / Sleeve sponsor: BBVA

Outfield players kits

Home	Home alt.	Away	Third	Third alt.

Goalkeeper kits

Goalkeeper 1	Goalkeeper 2	Goalkeeper 3	Goalkeeper 4

== Players ==
=== First-team squad ===
As of 31 August 2026

No.	Player	Nat.	Position(s)	Date of birth (age)	Height	Preferred Foot	Signed		Transfer fee	Contract end	Ref.
No.	Player	Nat.	Position(s)	Date of birth (age)	Height	Preferred Foot	In	From	Transfer fee	Contract end	Ref.
Goalkeepers
1	Josep Martínez	ESP	GK	27 May 1998 (age 28)	1.91 m (6 ft 3 in)	Right	2024	(Italy) Genoa	€13.2m	2029	
12	Raffaele Di Gennaro	ITA	GK	3 October 1993 (age 33)	1.86 m (6 ft 1 in)	Right	2023	(Italy) Gubbio	Free	2027	
49	Ivan Provedel	ITA	GK	17 March 1994 (age 32)	1.94 m (6 ft 4 in)	Right	2026	(Italy) Lazio	€3.0m	2029	
Defenders
6	John Stones	ENG	CB / DM	28 May 1994 (age 32)	1.88 m (6 ft 2 in)	Right	2026	(England) Manchester City	Free	2028	
25	Manuel Akanji	SUI	CB	19 July 1995 (age 31)	1.88 m (6 ft 2 in)	Right	2025 (Note: Initially signed on loan. The indicated transfer fee represents the total amount, including the initial loan fee.)	(England) Manchester City	€17.0m	2028	
28	Benjamin Pavard	FRA	CB / RB	28 March 1996 (age 30)	1.86 m (6 ft 1 in)	Right	2023	(Germany) Bayern Munich	€31.3m	2028	
30	Carlos Augusto	BRA	LWB / LB / CB	7 January 1999 (age 27)	1.84 m (6 ft 0 in)	Left	2023	(Italy) Monza	€13.2m	2028	
31	Yann Aurel Bisseck	GER	CB / RB	29 November 2000 (age 25)	1.96 m (6 ft 5 in)	Right	2023	(Denmark) AGF	€7.2m	2031	
32	Federico Dimarco (4th captain)	ITA	LWB / LM / LB	10 November 1997 (age 29)	1.75 m (5 ft 9 in)	Left	2018	(Switzerland) Sion	€5.2m	2027	
95	Alessandro Bastoni (3rd captain)	ITA	CB	13 April 1999 (age 27)	1.90 m (6 ft 3 in)	Left	2017	(Italy) Atalanta	€31.1m	2028	
99	Djed Spence	ENG	RB / LB / RWB / LWB	9 August 2000 (age 26)	1.84 m (6 ft 0 in)	Right	2026	(England) Tottenham Hotspur	€31.5m	2031	
Midfielders
5	Aleksandar Stanković	SRB	DM / CM / CB	3 August 2005 (age 21)	1.85 m (6 ft 1 in)	Right	2026	(Belgium) Club Brugge	€23.0m	2031	
7	Piotr Zieliński	POL	CM / AM / DM	20 May 1994 (age 32)	1.80 m (5 ft 11 in)	Both	2024	(Italy) Napoli	Free	2028	
8	Petar Sučić	CRO	CM / DM	25 October 2003 (age 23)	1.83 m (6 ft 0 in)	Right	2025	(Croatia) Dinamo Zagreb	€14.0m	2030	
11	Luis Henrique	BRA	RW / LW / RWB / LWB	14 December 2001 (age 24)	1.81 m (5 ft 11 in)	Right	2025	(France) Marseille	€23.0m	2030	
17	Andy Diouf	FRA	CM / RM / RWB / AM	17 May 2003 (age 23)	1.87 m (6 ft 2 in)	Left	2025	(France) Lens	€20.0m	2030	
20	Hakan Çalhanoğlu	TUR	DM / CM / AM	8 February 1994 (age 32)	1.78 m (5 ft 10 in)	Right	2021	(Italy) Milan	Free	2027	
21	Curtis Jones	ENG	CM / AM / DM	30 January 2001 (age 25)	1.85 m (6 ft 1 in)	Right	2026	(England) Liverpool	€30.0m	2031	
22	Henrikh Mkhitaryan	ARM	CM / AM	21 January 1989 (age 37)	1.77 m (5 ft 10 in)	Both	2022	(Italy) Roma	Free	2027	
23	Nicolò Barella (vice-captain)	ITA	CM	7 February 1997 (age 29)	1.75 m (5 ft 9 in)	Right	2019	(Italy) Cagliari	€40.5m	2029	
Forwards
9	Marcus Thuram	FRA	ST	6 August 1997 (age 29)	1.92 m (6 ft 4 in)	Right	2023	(Germany) Borussia Mönchengladbach	Free	2028	
10	Lautaro Martínez (captain)	ARG	ST	22 August 1997 (age 29)	1.74 m (5 ft 9 in)	Right	2018	(Argentina) Racing Club	€25.0m	2029	
14	Ange-Yoan Bonny	CIV	ST	25 October 2003 (age 23)	1.89 m (6 ft 2 in)	Right	2025	(Italy) Parma	€23.0m	2030	
94	Pio Esposito	ITA	ST	28 June 2005 (age 21)	1.91 m (6 ft 3 in)	Right	2023	Youth sector	N/A	2032	
Players transferred out during the season

== Transfers ==
=== In ===
==== Transfers ====
Date	Pos.	Player	Moving from	Fee	Notes	Ref.
Summer
1 July 2026	DF	(Switzerland) Manuel Akanji	(England) Manchester City	€15.0M	From loan to permanent transfer	
1 July 2026	MF	(Serbia) Aleksandar Stanković	(Belgium) Club Brugge	€23.0M	Buy-back clause triggered	
8 July 2026	GK	(Italy) Ivan Provedel	(Italy) Lazio	€3.0M		
30 July 2026	DF	(England) John Stones	(England) Manchester City	Free		
15 August 2026	DF	(England) Djed Spence	(England) Tottenham Hotspur	€31.5M + €3.5M		
21 August 2026	MF	(England) Curtis Jones	(England) Liverpool	€30.0M + €5.0M		

==== Loan returns ====
Date	Pos.	Player	Returning from	Notes	Ref.
Summer
30 June 2026	GK	(Italy) Matteo Zamarian	(Italy) Pro Patria		
30 June 2026	DF	(Italy) Mike Aidoo	(Italy) Pergolettese		
30 June 2026	DF	(Argentina) Franco Carboni	(Italy) Parma		
30 June 2026	DF	(Italy) Matteo Motta	(Italy) Lumezzane		
30 June 2026	DF	(France) Benjamin Pavard	(France) Marseille		
30 June 2026	DF	(Italy) Giacomo Stabile	(Italy) Bari		
30 June 2026	MF	(Nigeria) Ebenezer Akinsanmiro	(Italy) Pisa		
30 June 2026	MF	(Albania) Kristjan Asllani	(Turkey) Beşiktaş		
30 June 2026	MF	(Italy) Luca Di Maggio	(Italy) Padova		
30 June 2026	MF	(France) Yanis Massolin	(Italy) Modena		
30 June 2026	MF	(Venezuela) Daniele Quieto	(Italy) Latina		
30 June 2026	FW	(Italy) Giacomo De Pieri	(Italy) Bari		
30 June 2026	FW	(Italy) Sebastiano Esposito	(Italy) Cagliari		
Winter
31 December 2026	DF	(Argentina) Tomás Palacios	(Argentina) Estudiantes		

==== Inter Milan U23 acquisitions ====
Date	Pos.	Player	Moving from	Fee	Notes	Ref.
Summer
23 July 2026	GK	(Latvia) Roberts Apsits	(Italy) Virtus Francavilla	Undisclosed		
24 July 2026	DF	(Venezuela) Alessandro Milani	(Italy) Lazio	Undisclosed		
25 August 2026	FW	(Italy) Tommaso Fumagalli	(Italy) Como	Undisclosed		
29 August 2026	MF	(Brazil) Charlys	(Italy) Hellas Verona	N/A	Loan with option to buy	
1 September 2026	DF	(Italy) Lorenzo Tosto	(Italy) Empoli	N/A	Loan with option to buy	

=== Out ===
==== Released players ====
Date	Pos.	Player	Subsequent club	Join date	Notes	Ref.
Summer
30 June 2026	GK	(Switzerland) Yann Sommer	(Belgium) Club Brugge	14 July 2026	End of contract	
30 June 2026	DF	(Italy) Francesco Acerbi			End of contract	
30 June 2026	DF	(Italy) Matteo Darmian	(Italy) Bologna	8 October 2026	End of contract	
30 June 2026	DF	(Netherlands) Stefan de Vrij	(Greece) Panathinaikos	1 July 2026	End of contract	

==== Transfers ====
Date	Pos.	Player	Moving to	Fee	Notes	Ref.
Summer
1 July 2026	FW	(Italy) Sebastiano Esposito	(Italy) Cagliari	€4.0M + 40% sell-on	From loan to permanent transfer	
2 July 2026	DF	(Argentina) Franco Carboni	(Italy) Parma	Undisclosed	From loan to permanent transfer	
5 July 2026	DF	(Netherlands) Denzel Dumfries	(Spain) Real Madrid	€20.0M		
14 July 2026	MF	(Italy) Luca Di Maggio	(Italy) Avellino	Undisclosed		
15 July 2026	DF	(Italy) Tommaso Della Mora	(Italy) Grosseto	Undisclosed		
10 August 2026	FW	(Morocco) Aymen Zouin	(Italy) Parma	Undisclosed	Inter retain a buy-back clause	
10 August 2026	MF	(Venezuela) Daniele Quieto	(Italy) Cosenza	Undisclosed		
14 August 2026	DF	(Italy) Matteo Motta	(Italy) Pescara	Undisclosed		
1 September 2026	MF	(France) Issiaka Kamate	(Spain) Atlético Madrid	€1.7M + 30% sell-on	Inter will retain a €8.0M buy-back clause	

==== Loans out ====
Date	Pos.	Player	Loaned to	Fee	Notes	Ref.
Summer
6 July 2026	FW	(Italy) Giacomo De Pieri	(Italy) Ascoli	N/A	Loan with option to buy and counter-option	
8 July 2026	DF	(Greece) Christos Alexiou	(Greece) AEK Athens	N/A	Loan with option to buy and counter-option	
9 July 2026	DF	(Italy) Giacomo Stabile	(Italy) Südtirol	N/A	Loan with option to buy	
12 July 2026	FW	(Italy) Matteo Spinaccè	(Italy) Mantova	N/A	Loan with option to buy and counter-option	
21 July 2026	GK	(Italy) Matteo Zamarian	(Italy) Pro Sesto	N/A		
22 July 2026	DF	(Italy) Matteo Cocchi	(Italy) Padova	N/A	Loan with option to buy and counter-option	
23 July 2026	GK	(Latvia) Roberts Apsits	(Italy) Campobasso	N/A	Loan with option to buy and counter-option	
1 August 2026	MF	(Nigeria) Ebenezer Akinsanmiro	(Italy) Monza	N/A	Loan with obligation to buy for €7.5M and a 10% sell-on clause	
3 August 2026	MF	(Spain) Dilan Zárate	(Spain) Cádiz	N/A	Loan with option to buy and counter-option	
14 August 2026	MF	(Italy) Davide Frattesi	(Italy) Lazio	€5.0M	Loan with option to buy for €10.0M, 50% sell-on clause above €15.0M, plus €3M in additional bonuses	
17 August 2026	MF	(Italy) Thomas Berenbruch	(Italy) Avellino	N/A	Loan with option to buy and counter-option	
19 August 2026	FW	(Italy) Manuel Pinotti	(Italy) Audace Cerignola	N/A		
25 August 2026	DF	(France) Yvan Maye	(Italy) Monza	N/A	Loan with option to buy and counter-option	
26 August 2026	MF	(Italy) Mattia Zanchetta	(Italy) Giana Erminio	N/A		
27 August 2026	MF	(Slovenia) Luka Topalović	(Italy) Carrarese	N/A	Loan with option to buy and counter-option	
29 August 2026	MF	(Albania) Kristjan Asllani	(United Arab Emirates) Al Jazira	€2.0M	Loan with conditional obligation to buy for €5.0M	
31 August 2026	MF	(France) Yanis Massolin	(Italy) Cagliari	N/A	Loan with option to buy and counter-option	
1 September 2026	DF	(Italy) Lamine Ballo	(Italy) AlbinoLeffe	N/A		

==== Loans ended ====
Date	Pos.	Player	Returning to	Notes	Ref.
Summer
30 June 2026	DF	(Switzerland) Manuel Akanji	(England) Manchester City		

== Pre-season and friendlies ==
Win Draw Loss Fixtures

22 July 2026 Friendly	SV Aasen	0–16	Internazionale	Donaueschingen, Germany
10:30 CEST (UTC+2)		Report	Frattesi 1', 11'; Topalović 15', 20', 38'; Mosconi 43'; Diouf 48', 64'; Esposito 52', 67', 82', 87', 89'; Iddrissou 60', 75'; Dimarco 69'	Referee: Martin Petersen (Germany)

26 July 2026 Friendly	Karlsruher SC	1–2	Internazionale	Karlsruhe, Germany
16:30 CEST (UTC+2)	Civeja 50', (yellow card) 70'	Report	Bovio (yellow card) 31'; Diouf 90+1', 90+4'	Stadium: Wildparkstadion; Attendance: 31,326; Referee: Daniel Schlager (Germany)

1 August 2026 Friendly	Manchester City	1–1 (1–3 p)	Internazionale	Kowloon, Hong Kong
19:30 HKT (UTC+8)	Mubama 14'; Khusanov (yellow card) 83'	Report	Pavard 20'; Stanković (yellow card) 56'	Stadium: Kai Tak Sports Park; Attendance: 42,826; Referee: Tam Ping Wun (Hong Kong)
	Penalties
	Aït-Nouri (penalty missed); Khusanov (penalty missed); González (penalty missed); Echeverri (penalty scored)		(penalty scored) Zieliński; (penalty missed) Frattesi; (penalty scored) Mosconi; (penalty scored) Lavelli

5 August 2026 Friendly	Milan	1–1	Internazionale	Perth, Australia
19:00 AWST (UTC+8)	Nkunku 84' (pen.); Estupiñán (yellow card) 90+3'	Report	Bisseck (yellow card) 36'; Dimarco 52'	Stadium: Perth Stadium; Attendance: 52,310; Referee: Lachlan Keevers (Australia)

8 August 2026 Friendly	Juventus	1–2	Internazionale	Perth, Australia
19:00 AWST (UTC+8)	Rugani (yellow card) 75'; Conceição 85'	Report	Dimarco 20'; Diouf 62'	Stadium: Perth Stadium; Attendance: 50,325; Referee: Tim Danaskos (Australia)

15 August 2026 Friendly	Internazionale	1–0	Real Betis	Bari, Italy
19:30 CEST (UTC+2)	Esposito (yellow card) 65'; Stones 82'	Report	Natan (yellow card) 90+5'	Stadium: Stadio San Nicola; Referee: Leonardo Mastrodomenico (Italy)

3 October 2026 Friendly	Internazionale	2–0	Lumezzane	Appiano Gentile
11:00 CEST (UTC+2)	Mkhitaryan 14'; Agbonifo 62'	Report		Stadium: Centro Sportivo Angelo Moratti

== Competitions ==
=== Overview ===
Competition	First match	Last match	Starting round	Final position	Record							
Competition	First match	Last match	Starting round	Final position	Pld	W	D	L	GF	GA	GD	Win %
Serie A	22 August 2026	30 May 2027	Matchday 1	TBD	12	9	2	1	32	17	+15	75.00
Coppa Italia	1 December 2026	TBD	Round of 16	TBD	0	0	0	0	0	0	+0	—
Supercoppa Italiana	22 December 2026		Final	TBD	0	0	0	0	0	0	+0	—
UEFA Champions League	8 September 2026	TBD	League phase	TBD	4	2	0	2	8	6	+2	50.00
Total					16	11	2	3	40	23	+17	68.75

Last updated: 22 November 2026
Source: Soccerway

=== Serie A ===
==== League table ====
Pos	Team	Pld	W	D	L	GF	GA	GD	Pts	Qualification or relegation
1	Lazio	12	10	2	0	28	9	+19	32	Qualification for the Champions League league phase
2	Roma	12	9	3	0	36	11	+25	30	Qualification for the Champions League league phase
3	Inter Milan	12	9	2	1	32	17	+15	29	Qualification for the Champions League league phase
4	AC Milan	12	8	3	1	28	14	+14	27	Qualification for the Champions League league phase
5	Como	12	8	2	2	20	10	+10	26	Qualification for the Europa League league phase (Note: The winners of the 2026–27 Coppa Italia and the fifth-placed team both qualify for the Europa League league phase. If the Coppa Italia winners finish in the top five, the sixth-placed team will qualify for the Europa League league phase. If Italy are one of the two associations with the highest UEFA coefficient points, fifth place will qualify for the Champions League league phase and the other qualifying spots will move down one position.)

Updated to match(es) played on 22 November 2026. Source: Serie A
Rules for classification: 1) Points; 2) Head-to-head points; 3) Head-to-head goal difference; 4) Goal difference; 5) Goals scored; 6) Drawing of lots.
End-of-season ties on points for 1st or 17th are instead decided by a one- or two-leg play-off, respectively, unless the play-off would involve a UEFA competition finalist (in which case rules 2–6 apply). Rules 2–6 determine home advantage (for 17th, the better-ranked team hosts the second leg); if three or more teams are tied, they also select the two play-off teams.

==== Results summary ====
Overall								Home						Away					
Pld	W	D	L	GF	GA	GD	Pts	W	D	L	GF	GA	GD	W	D	L	GF	GA	GD
12	9	2	1	32	17	+15	29	6	0	0	19	7	+12	3	2	1	13	10	+3

Last updated: 22 November 2026.
Source: Serie A

==== Results by round ====
Round	1	2	3	4	5	6	7	8	9	10	11	12	13	14	15	16	17	18	19	20	21	22	23	24	25	26	27	28	29	30	31	32	33	34	35	36	37	38
Ground	H	A	H	H	A	H	A	H	A	A	H	A	H	A	H	A	H	A	H	A	H	A	H	H	A	H	A	A	H	A	H	A	H	A	H	A	H	A
Result	W	W	W	W	D	W	W	W	W	L	W	D																										
Position	2	2	2	2	2	1	1	1	1	2	2	3																										
Points	3	6	9	12	13	16	19	22	25	25	28	29																										

Updated to match(es) played on 22 November 2026. Source: Serie A
A = Away; H = Home; W = Win; D = Draw; L = Loss
Notes:
- Positions show the situation at the end of the corresponding gameweeks (GW), not the position at the conclusion of matches or game days.

==== Matches ====
The league fixtures were released on 5 June 2026.

22 August 2026 1	Internazionale	4–1	Monza	Milan
18:30 CEST (UTC+2)	Çalhanoğlu 6', (yellow card) 45+1'; L. Martínez (yellow card) 34'; Zieliński 48'; Esposito 55'; Bisseck 63'	Report	Varela 29'; Kouadio (yellow card) 69'; Lucchesi (yellow card) 84'	Stadium: San Siro; Attendance: 75,013; Referee: Livio Marinelli

30 August 2026 2	Cagliari	0–1	Internazionale	Cagliari
20:45 CEST (UTC+2)	Deiola (yellow card) 56'; Kevin Carlos (yellow card) 88'	Report	Çalhanoğlu 9'; Akanji (yellow card) 14'	Stadium: Unipol Domus; Attendance: 16,412; Referee: Michael Fabbri

5 September 2026 3	Internazionale	3–2	Napoli	Milan
18:00 CEST (UTC+2)	L. Martínez 56', 90+1', (yellow card) 68'; Thuram 82'	Report	Vergara (yellow card) 35'; Politano 50'; Højlund 53'; Marín (yellow card) 77'	Stadium: San Siro; Attendance: 75,423; Referee: Simone Sozza

14 September 2026 4	Internazionale	5–3	Udinese	Milan
20:45 CEST (UTC+2)	Carlos Augusto 26'; Barella 35'; Thuram 57'; Mkhitaryan (yellow card) 60'; Esposito 67'; Bonny 79'	Report	Abankwah 9'; Ekkelenkamp 16'; Davis (yellow card) 45'; Gueye 90+1'	Stadium: San Siro; Attendance: 73,705; Referee: Luca Pairetto

19 September 2026 5	Roma	2–2	Internazionale	Rome
18:00 CEST (UTC+2)	Koné 6', 37'; Ndicka (yellow card) 73'; Koulierakis (yellow card) 82'; Ghilardi (yellow card) 89'	Report	Barella (yellow card) 11'; Akanji (yellow card) 45+4'; L. Martínez 46', 79'; Bastoni (yellow card) 57'	Stadium: Stadio Olimpico; Attendance: 66,241; Referee: Davide Massa

10 October 2026 6	Internazionale	3–0	Parma	Milan
18:00 CEST (UTC+2)	Sučić 13'; Çalhanoğlu 18' (pen.); Thuram 31'	Report		Stadium: San Siro; Attendance: 74,907; Referee: Kevin Bonacina

17 October 2026 7	Bologna	1–3	Internazionale	Bologna
18:00 CEST (UTC+2)	Theate (yellow card) 34'; Pobega 10', (yellow card) 57'; Miranda (yellow card) 71'; Bernardeschi (yellow card) 72'	Report	Esposito (yellow card) 35'; Thuram 44', (yellow card) 61'; Carlos Augusto 69', (yellow card) 79'; Bonny 83'	Stadium: Stadio Renato Dall'Ara; Attendance: 31,303; Referee: Daniele Doveri

25 October 2026 8	Internazionale	2–1	Fiorentina	Milan
12:30 CEST (UTC+2)	Thuram 90+1'; Zieliński 90+7' (pen.)	Report	Jiménez 65'; Viery (yellow card) 70'	Stadium: San Siro; Attendance: 74,642; Referee: Maurizio Mariani

28 October 2026 9	Venezia	0–2	Internazionale	Venice
18:30 CET (UTC+1)		Report	Bastoni (yellow card) 28'; Barella (yellow card) 56'; Moreno 80' (o.g.); Halhal 82' (o.g.)	Stadium: Stadio Pier Luigi Penzo; Attendance: 12,048; Referee: Luca Pairetto

31 October 2026 10	Milan	3–1	Internazionale	Milan
20:45 CET (UTC+1)	Pulisic 4'; Rabiot 10'; Moreira 43', (yellow card) 52'; De Winter (yellow card) 49'	Report	Bastoni 22'; Carlos Augusto (yellow card) 90'	Stadium: San Siro; Attendance: 77,691; Referee: Marco Guida

8 November 2026 11	Internazionale	2–0	Como	Milan
18:00 CET (UTC+1)	Esposito 12', (yellow card) 72'; Thuram 19'	Report		Stadium: San Siro; Attendance: 77,593; Referee: Daniele Chiffi

22 November 2026 12	Atalanta	4–4	Internazionale	Bergamo
20:45 CET (UTC+1)	Elmas 35'; Scalvini (yellow card) 60'; De Ketelaere 72', 80'; Zappacosta (yellow card) 74'; Kessié 90+1' (pen.)	Report	Esposito 16', 32', 52'; Sučić 75' (pen.); Carlos Augusto (yellow card) 90+5'	Stadium: New Balance Arena; Referee: Fabio Maresca

28 November 2026 13	Internazionale	v	Genoa	Milan
20:45 CET (UTC+1)		Report		Stadium: San Siro

5 December 2026 14	Frosinone	v	Internazionale	Frosinone
18:00 CET (UTC+1)		Report		Stadium: Stadio Benito Stirpe

13 December 2026 15	Internazionale	v	Torino	Milan
15:00 CET (UTC+1)		Report		Stadium: San Siro

18 December 2026 16	Lecce	v	Internazionale	Lecce
20:45 CET (UTC+1)		Report		Stadium: Stadio Via del mare

3 January 2027 17	Internazionale	v	Sassuolo	Milan
12:30 CET (UTC+1)		Report		Stadium: San Siro

6 January 2027 18	Lazio	v	Internazionale	Rome
20:45 CET (UTC+1)		Report		Stadium: Stadio Olimpico

10 January 2027 19	Internazionale	v	Juventus	Milan
20:45 CET (UTC+1)		Report		Stadium: San Siro

16 January 2027 20	Parma	v	Internazionale	Parma
--:-- CET (UTC+1)		Report		Stadium: Stadio Ennio Tardini

23 January 2027 21	Internazionale	v	Venezia	Milan
--:-- CET (UTC+1)		Report		Stadium: San Siro

30 January 2027 22	Napoli	v	Internazionale	Naples
--:-- CET (UTC+1)		Report		Stadium: Stadio Diego Armando Maradona

6 February 2027 23	Internazionale	v	Cagliari	Milan
--:-- CET (UTC+1)		Report		Stadium: San Siro

13 February 2027 24	Internazionale	v	Milan	Milan
--:-- CET (UTC+1)		Report		Stadium: San Siro

20 February 2027 25	Fiorentina	v	Internazionale	Florence
--:-- CET (UTC+1)		Report		Stadium: Stadio Artemio Franchi

27 February 2027 26	Internazionale	v	Atalanta	Milan
--:-- CET (UTC+1)		Report		Stadium: San Siro

6 March 2027 27	Udinese	v	Internazionale	Udine
--:-- CET (UTC+1)		Report		Stadium: Stadio Friuli

13 March 2027 28	Torino	v	Internazionale	Turin
--:-- CET (UTC+1)		Report		Stadium: Stadio Olimpico Grande Torino

20 March 2027 29	Internazionale	v	Frosinone	Milan
--:-- CET (UTC+1)		Report		Stadium: San Siro

3 April 2027 30	Genoa	v	Internazionale	Genoa
--:-- CEST (UTC+2)		Report		Stadium: Stadio Luigi Ferraris

10 April 2027 31	Internazionale	v	Roma	Milan
--:-- CEST (UTC+2)		Report		Stadium: San Siro

17 April 2027 32	Monza	v	Internazionale	Monza
--:-- CEST (UTC+2)		Report		Stadium: Stadio Brianteo

24 April 2027 33	Internazionale	v	Bologna	Milan
--:-- CEST (UTC+2)		Report		Stadium: San Siro

1 May 2027 34	Como	v	Internazionale	Como
--:-- CEST (UTC+2)		Report		Stadium: Stadio Giuseppe Sinigaglia

8 May 2027 35	Internazionale	v	Lecce	Milan
--:-- CEST (UTC+2)		Report		Stadium: San Siro

15 May 2027 36	Juventus	v	Internazionale	Turin
--:-- CEST (UTC+2)		Report		Stadium: Juventus Stadium

22 May 2027 37	Internazionale	v	Lazio	Milan
--:-- CEST (UTC+2)		Report		Stadium: San Siro

29 May 2027 38	Sassuolo	v	Internazionale	Reggio Emilia
--:-- CEST (UTC+2)		Report		Stadium: Mapei Stadium – Città del Tricolore

=== Coppa Italia ===
1 December 2026 Round of 16	Internazionale	v	Genoa	Milan
21:00 CET (UTC+1)		Report		Stadium: San Siro

=== Supercoppa Italiana ===
22 December 2026 Final	Internazionale	v	Lazio	Milan
21:00 CET (UTC+1)				Stadium: San Siro

=== UEFA Champions League ===
==== League phase ====
The league phase draw was held on 27 August 2026. Inter were drawn at home against Club Brugge, Shakhtar Donetsk, VfB Stuttgart and Liverpool, and away to Real Madrid, Feyenoord, Borussia Dortmund and Slovan Bratislava.

Pos	Team	Pld	W	D	L	GF	GA	GD	Pts	Qualification
13	(Germany) Bayern Munich	4	2	2	0	12	5	+7	8	Advance to knockout phase play-offs (seeded)
14	(Germany) VfB Stuttgart	4	2	1	1	7	4	+3	7	Advance to knockout phase play-offs (seeded)
15	(Italy) Inter Milan	4	2	0	2	8	6	+2	6	Advance to knockout phase play-offs (seeded)
16	(Austria) LASK	4	2	0	2	10	9	+1	6	Advance to knockout phase play-offs (seeded)
17	(England) Manchester United	4	2	0	2	8	8	0	6	Advance to knockout phase play-offs (unseeded)

Updated to match(es) played on 4 November 2026. Source: UEFA
Rules for classification: League phase tiebreakers

Round	1	2	3	4	5	6	7	8
Ground	A	H	H	A	H	A	H	A
Result	L	L	W	W				
Position	25	29	20	15				
Points	0	0	3	6				

Updated to match(es) played on 4 November 2026. Source: UEFA
A = Away; H = Home; W = Win; D = Draw; L = Loss

Win Draw Loss Fixtures

8 September 2026 1	Real Madrid (Spain)	2–1	(Italy) Internazionale	Madrid, Spain
21:00 CEST (UTC+2)	Mbappé 14'; Valverde 23'; Huijsen (yellow card) 79'	Report	Çalhanoğlu (yellow card) 39'; Carlos Augusto 77'; L. Martínez (yellow card) 79'; Bisseck (yellow card) 90+4'	Stadium: Bernabéu; Attendance: 74,858; Referee: Michael Oliver (England)

13 October 2026 2	Internazionale (Italy)	3–4	(Belgium) Club Brugge	Milan, Italy
21:00 CEST (UTC+2)	Çalhanoğlu (yellow card) 29'; Akanji (yellow card) 39'; L. Martínez 44', 81'; Bonny 90+3'	Report	Spileers (yellow card) 27'; Tresoldi 30' (pen.), 63', 74'; Virgili (yellow card) 70'; Lee (yellow card) 73'; Vermant 87'; Lemaréchal (yellow card) 90+6'	Stadium: San Siro; Attendance: 73,859; Referee: Rohit Saggi (Norway)

21 October 2026 3	Internazionale (Italy)	1–0	(Ukraine) Shakhtar Donetsk	Milan, Italy
21:00 CEST (UTC+2)	Thuram (yellow card) 54'; Bastoni (yellow card) 66' (yellow-red card) 68'; Sučić (yellow card) 72'; Carlos Augusto 77'	Report	Ocheretko (yellow card) 36'; Marlon Gomes (yellow card) 68'	Stadium: San Siro; Attendance: 73,352; Referee: Harm Osmers (Germany)

3 November 2026 4	Feyenoord (Netherlands)	0–3	(Italy) Internazionale	Rotterdam, Netherlands
21:00 CET (UTC+1)	Zechiël (yellow card) 39'	Report	Çalhanoğlu (yellow card) 3'; Bisseck 8'; Esposito 34'; Akanji (yellow card) 39'; Zieliński 54'	Stadium: De Kuip; Attendance: 43,649; Referee: Glenn Nyberg (Sweden)

25 November 2026 5	Internazionale (Italy)	v	(Germany) VfB Stuttgart	Milan, Italy
21:00 CET (UTC+1)		Report		Stadium: San Siro

9 December 2026 6	Borussia Dortmund (Germany)	v	(Italy) Internazionale	Dortmund, Germany
21:00 CET (UTC+1)		Report		Stadium: Westfalenstadion

19 January 2027 7	Internazionale (Italy)	v	(England) Liverpool	Milan, Italy
21:00 CET (UTC+1)		Report		Stadium: San Siro

27 January 2027 8	Slovan Bratislava (Slovakia)	v	(Italy) Internazionale	Bratislava, Slovakia
21:00 CET (UTC+1)		Report		Stadium: Tehelné pole

== Statistics ==
As of match played 22 November 2026

=== Appearances and goals ===
No.	Pos	Nat	Player	Total		Serie A		Coppa Italia		Supercoppa Italiana		Champions League	
No.	Pos	Nat	Player	Apps	Goals	Apps	Goals	Apps	Goals	Apps	Goals	Apps	Goals
Goalkeepers
1	GK	(Spain) ESP	Josep Martínez	14	0	10	0	0	0	0	0	4	0
12	GK	(Italy) ITA	Raffaele Di Gennaro	0	0	0	0	0	0	0	0	0	0
49	GK	(Italy) ITA	Ivan Provedel	2	0	2	0	0	0	0	0	0	0
Defenders
6	DF	(England) ENG	John Stones	4	0	1+2	0	0	0	0	0	0+1	0
25	DF	(Switzerland) SUI	Manuel Akanji	13	0	9+2	0	0	0	0	0	2	0
28	DF	(France) FRA	Benjamin Pavard	8	0	3+2	0	0	0	0	0	2+1	0
30	DF	(Brazil) BRA	Carlos Augusto	13	4	7+3	2	0	0	0	0	3	2
31	DF	(Germany) GER	Yann Aurel Bisseck	13	2	8+1	1	0	0	0	0	3+1	1
32	DF	(Italy) ITA	Federico Dimarco	15	0	9+3	0	0	0	0	0	3	0
95	DF	(Italy) ITA	Alessandro Bastoni	14	1	11	1	0	0	0	0	3	0
99	DF	(England) ENG	Djed Spence	8	0	3+2	0	0	0	0	0	2+1	0
Midfielders
5	MF	(Serbia) SRB	Aleksandar Stanković	7	0	1+4	0	0	0	0	0	0+2	0
7	MF	(Poland) POL	Piotr Zieliński	14	3	7+3	2	0	0	0	0	2+2	1
8	MF	(Croatia) CRO	Petar Sučić	15	2	6+5	2	0	0	0	0	1+3	0
11	MF	(Brazil) BRA	Luis Henrique	6	0	2+3	0	0	0	0	0	0+1	0
17	MF	(France) FRA	Andy Diouf	13	0	8+2	0	0	0	0	0	2+1	0
20	MF	(Turkey) TUR	Hakan Çalhanoğlu	14	3	7+3	3	0	0	0	0	4	0
21	MF	(England) ENG	Curtis Jones	6	0	1+4	0	0	0	0	0	1	0
22	MF	(Armenia) ARM	Henrikh Mkhitaryan	10	0	4+3	0	0	0	0	0	0+3	0
23	MF	(Italy) ITA	Nicolò Barella	15	1	10+1	1	0	0	0	0	4	0
Forwards
9	FW	(France) FRA	Marcus Thuram	15	6	9+2	6	0	0	0	0	4	0
10	FW	(Argentina) ARG	Lautaro Martínez	8	6	4+2	4	0	0	0	0	2	2
14	FW	(Ivory Coast) CIV	Ange-Yoan Bonny	14	3	1+9	2	0	0	0	0	1+3	1
53	FW	(Italy) ITA	Matteo Lavelli	1	0	0+1	0	0	0	0	0	0	0
94	FW	(Italy) ITA	Pio Esposito	14	7	9+3	6	0	0	0	0	1+1	1
Players transferred out during the season

Source: Competitions

=== Goalscorers ===
Rank	No.	Pos.	Player	Serie A	Coppa Italia	Supercoppa Italiana	Champions League	Total
1	94	FW	(Italy) Pio Esposito	6	0	0	1	7
2	9	FW	(France) Marcus Thuram	6	0	0	0	6
2	10	FW	(Argentina) Lautaro Martínez	4	0	0	2	6
4	30	DF	(Brazil) Carlos Augusto	2	0	0	2	4
5	7	MF	(Poland) Piotr Zieliński	2	0	0	1	3
5	14	FW	(Ivory Coast) Ange-Yoan Bonny	2	0	0	1	3
5	20	MF	(Turkey) Hakan Çalhanoğlu	3	0	0	0	3
8	8	MF	(Croatia) Petar Sučić	2	0	0	0	2
8	31	DF	(Germany) Yann Aurel Bisseck	1	0	0	1	2
10	23	MF	(Italy) Nicolò Barella	1	0	0	0	1
10	95	DF	(Italy) Alessandro Bastoni	1	0	0	0	1
Own goals				2	0	0	0	2
Totals				32	0	0	8	40

=== Assists ===
Rank	No.	Pos.	Player	Serie A	Coppa Italia	Supercoppa Italiana	Champions League	Total
1	17	MF	(France) Andy Diouf	4	0	0	0	4
3	9	FW	(France) Marcus Thuram	3	0	0	0	3
3	23	MF	(Italy) Nicolò Barella	2	0	0	1	3
3	32	DF	(Italy) Federico Dimarco	2	0	0	1	3
3	99	DF	(England) Djed Spence	1	0	0	2	3
6	7	MF	(Poland) Piotr Zieliński	2	0	0	0	2
6	22	MF	(Armenia) Henrikh Mkhitaryan	1	0	0	1	2
6	25	DF	(Switzerland) Manuel Akanji	2	0	0	0	2
6	30	DF	(Brazil) Carlos Augusto	2	0	0	0	2
10	5	MF	(Serbia) Aleksandar Stanković	0	0	0	1	1
10	10	FW	(Argentina) Lautaro Martínez	0	0	0	1	1
10	94	FW	(Italy) Pio Esposito	1	0	0	0	1
Totals				21	0	0	7	28

=== Hat-tricks ===
Player	Opponents	Result	Date	Competition
(Italy) Pio Esposito	Atalanta (A)	4–4	22 November 2026	Serie A

=== Clean sheets ===
Rank	No.	Player	Serie A	Coppa Italia	Supercoppa Italiana	Champions League	Total
1	1	(Spain) Josep Martínez	3	0	0	2	5
2	49	(Italy) Ivan Provedel	1	0	0	0	1
Totals			4	0	0	2	6

=== Disciplinary record ===
No.	Pos.	Player	Serie A			Coppa Italia			Supercoppa Italiana			Champions League			Total		
No.	Pos.	Player	Yellow card	(yellow card) (yellow-red card)	Red card	Yellow card	(yellow card) (yellow-red card)	Red card	Yellow card	(yellow card) (yellow-red card)	Red card	Yellow card	(yellow card) (yellow-red card)	Red card	Yellow card	(yellow card) (yellow-red card)	Red card
8	MF	(Croatia) Petar Sučić	0	0	0	0	0	0	0	0	0	1	0	0	1	0	0
9	FW	(France) Marcus Thuram	1	0	0	0	0	0	0	0	0	1	0	0	2	0	0
10	FW	(Argentina) Lautaro Martínez	2	0	0	0	0	0	0	0	0	1	0	0	3	0	0
20	MF	(Turkey) Hakan Çalhanoğlu	1	0	0	0	0	0	0	0	0	3	0	0	4	0	0
22	MF	(Armenia) Henrikh Mkhitaryan	1	0	0	0	0	0	0	0	0	0	0	0	1	0	0
23	MF	(Italy) Nicolò Barella	2	0	0	0	0	0	0	0	0	0	0	0	2	0	0
25	DF	(Switzerland) Manuel Akanji	2	0	0	0	0	0	0	0	0	2	0	0	4	0	0
30	DF	(Brazil) Carlos Augusto	3	0	0	0	0	0	0	0	0	0	0	0	3	0	0
31	DF	(Germany) Yann Aurel Bisseck	0	0	0	0	0	0	0	0	0	1	0	0	1	0	0
94	FW	(Italy) Pio Esposito	2	0	0	0	0	0	0	0	0	0	0	0	2	0	0
95	DF	(Italy) Alessandro Bastoni	2	0	0	0	0	0	0	0	0	0	1	0	2	1	0
Totals			16	0	0	0	0	0	0	0	0	9	1	0	25	1	0

== Awards ==
=== Monthly awards ===
Serie A Goal of the Month

Month	Winner	Opponents	Date	Ref.
Aug.–Sep.	(Turkey) Hakan Çalhanoğlu	Monza	22 August 2026	
