= 2026–27 AC Monza season =

AC Monza football team, season 2026-27

AC Monza
2026–27 season
- Monza vs. Sassuolo, 18 September 2026
- Owner: Beckett Layne Ventures
- President: Lauren Crampsie
- Head coach: Ivan Jurić
- Stadium: Stadio Brianteo
- Serie A: 18th
- Coppa Italia: Round of 16
- Top goalscorer: League: Gustavo Varela (9); All: Gustavo Varela (11)
- Highest home attendance: 13,694 vs Napoli; 28 October 2026, Serie A
- Lowest home attendance: 3,229 vs Avellino; 14 August 2026, Coppa Italia
- Biggest win: 3–0 vs Avellino (H); 14 August 2026, Coppa Italia
- Biggest defeat: 4–1 vs Inter Milan (A); 22 August 2026, Serie A
Home colours	Away colours	Third colours

The 2026–27 season is the 115th season in the history of the AC Monza, the 4th season in Serie A in their history, after defeating Catanzaro in the play-off final. They also participate in the Coppa Italia, the Italian domestic cup.

== Squad ==
As of 1 September 2026

Note: Flags indicate national team as defined under FIFA eligibility rules; some limited exceptions apply. Players may hold more than one non-FIFA nationality.

No.	Pos.	Nation	Player
1	GK	SWE	Noel Törnqvist (on loan from Como)
2	DF	GEO	Saba Goglichidze (on loan from Udinese)
3	DF	ITA	Lorenzo Lucchesi
4	DF	POL	Jan Ziółkowski (on loan from Roma)
5	DF	FRA	Yvan Maye (on loan from Inter Milan)
6	DF	BUL	Valentin Antov
7	DF	POR	Ricardo Mangas (on loan from Sporting CP)
8	MF	FRA	Manga Foe Ondoa
9	FW	POR	Gustavo Varela
10	FW	ITA	Patrick Cutrone
11	MF	ENG	Omari Forson
14	MF	NGR	Ebenezer Akinsanmiro (on loan from Inter Milan)
16	FW	BEL	Cyril Ngonge (on loan from Napoli)
17	FW	SEN	Keita Baldé
19	DF	ITA	Samuele Birindelli
20	GK	SEN	Demba Thiam

No.	Pos.	Nation	Player
21	MF	ITA	Leonardo Colombo
22	FW	ARG	Exequiel Zeballos
24	DF	ITA	Adam Bakoune
26	FW	ITA	Patrick Ciurria
27	MF	GER	Idrissa Touré
28	FW	ITA	Andrea Colpani
32	MF	ITA	Matteo Pessina (captain)
43	GK	SLO	Aljaž Strajnar
44	DF	ITA	Andrea Carboni
46	MF	ENG	Jay Robinson (on loan from Southampton)
47	FW	POR	Dany Mota
60	DF	ITA	Eddy Kouadio (on loan from Fiorentina)
70	FW	ITA	Kevin Martins
80	MF	ITA	Mathis Mout
90	MF	ITA	Michael Folorunsho (on loan from Napoli)

== Transfers ==
=== Summer window ===
==== In ====
Date	Pos.	Player	From	Fee	Notes	Ref.
1 July 2026	DF	(Italy) Lorenzo Lucchesi	(Italy) Fiorentina	€1,000,000	Loan made permanent transfer	
1 July 2026	FW	(Italy) Patrick Cutrone	(Italy) Como	€4,000,000	Loan made permanent transfer	
1 July 2026	MF	(France) Manga Foe Ondoa	(Portugal) Estoril Praia	€1,500,000		
27 July 2026	FW	(Portugal) Gustavo Varela	(Portugal) Benfica B	€2,500,000	+ €1,500,000 in add-ons	
21 August 2026	MF	(Germany) Idrissa Touré	(Italy) Pisa	€2,300,000	Part of swap deal involving Andrea Petagna	
1 September 2026	MF	(Argentina) Exequiel Zeballos	(Argentina) Boca Juniors	€4,500,000	+ €1,000,000 in add-ons	

==== Loans in ====
Date	Pos.	Player	From	Fee	Notes	Ref.
8 July 2026	DF	(Italy) Eddy Kouadio	(Italy) Fiorentina	Free	Option to buy for an undisclosed fee, buy-back option for an undisclosed fee	
24 July 2026	DF	(Portugal) Ricardo Mangas	(Portugal) Sporting CP	Free	Obligation to buy for €1,500,000 under certain conditions + €400,000 add-ons	
1 August 2026	MF	(Nigeria) Ebenezer Akinsanmiro	(Italy) Inter Milan	Free	Obligation to buy for €7,500,000 under certain conditions	
7 August 2026	MF	(England) Jay Robinson	(England) Southampton	Free		
25 August 2026	DF	(France) Yvan Maye	(Italy) Inter Milan Under-23	Free	Option to buy for an undisclosed fee, buy-back option for an undisclosed fee	
28 August 2026	FW	(Belgium) Cyril Ngonge	(Italy) Napoli	Free	Option to buy for an undisclosed fee	
28 August 2026	MF	(Italy) Michael Folorunsho	(Italy) Napoli	Free	Option to buy for an undisclosed fee	
31 August 2026	DF	(Poland) Jan Ziółkowski	(Italy) Roma	Free	Option to buy for €18,000,000	
31 August 2026	GK	(Sweden) Noel Törnqvist	(Italy) Como	Free		
1 September 2026	DF	(Georgia (country)) Saba Goglichidze	(Italy) Udinese	Free	Option to buy for an undisclosed fee	

==== Loan returns ====
Date	Pos.	Player	From	Fee	Notes	Ref.
30 June 2026	MF	(Italy) Alessandro Berretta	(Italy) Giana Erminio	Free	Return from loan	
30 June 2026	FW	(France) Solomon Loubao	(France) Sochaux	Free	Return from loan	
30 June 2026	FW	(Italy) Kevin Martins	(Italy) Sambenedettese	Free	Return from loan	

==== Out ====
Date	Pos.	Player	To	Fee	Notes	Ref.
1 July 2026	MF	(Equatorial Guinea) Pedro Obiang	Retired			
1 July 2026	GK	(Italy) Alessandro Sorrentino	(Italy) Padova	Undisclosed	Loan made permanent transfer	
1 July 2026	FW	(Croatia) Mirko Marić	(Croatia) Lokomotiva Zagreb	Free	End of contract	
6 July 2026	MF	(Brazil) Hernani	(Italy) Palermo	€1,000,000		
11 July 2026	MF	(Brazil) Paulo Azzi	(Italy) Modena	Undisclosed		
18 July 2026	DF	(Italy) Luca Ravanelli	(Italy) Sampdoria	€300,000		
18 August 2026	DF	(Sweden) Arvid Brorsson	(Poland) Raków Częstochowa	Undisclosed		
20 August 2026	FW	(Italy) Andrea Petagna	(Italy) Pisa	Free	Part of swap deal involving Idrissa Touré	

==== Loans out ====
Date	Pos.	Player	To	Fee	Notes	Ref.
14 July 2026	DF	(Italy) Samuele Capolupo	(Italy) Spezia	Free	Option to buy for an undisclosed fee + buy-back option for an undisclosed fee	
26 August 2026	MF	(Italy) Alessandro Berretta	(Italy) Pergolettese	Free		
28 August 2026	GK	(Italy) Semuel Pizzignacco	(Italy) Carrarese	Free		
1 September 2026	DF	(Italy) Filippo Delli Carri	(Italy) Sampdoria	Free	Option to buy for €650,000, obligation to buy for €650,000 under certain conditions	
1 September 2026	MF	(Italy) Nicolas Galazzi	(Italy) Padova	Free		
1 September 2026	FW	(France) Solomon Loubao	(Italy) Catanzaro	Free		

==== Loan returns ====
Date	Pos.	Player	To	Fee	Notes	Ref.
30 June 2026	MF	(Italy) Giuseppe Caso	(Italy) Modena	Free	Option to buy not exercised	
30 June 2026	FW	(Uruguay) Agustín Álvarez	(Italy) Sassuolo	Free	Option to buy not exercised	

== Friendlies ==
The summer friendly dates were released on 4 July 2026.

=== Pre-season ===
18 July 2026 Friendly	Monza (Italy)	4–3	(Italy) Pro Vercelli	Monza
CEST 18:00 UTC+2		Report		Stadium: Centro sportivo Silvio e Luigi Berlusconi - Monzello

24 July 2026 Friendly	Monza (Italy)	2–0	(Turkey) Galatasaray	Linz
CEST 20:00 UTC+2		Report		Stadium: Raiffeisen Arena

30 July 2026 Friendly	Monza (Italy)	1–3	(Greece) Aris Thessaloniki	Monza
CEST 18:00 UTC+2		Report		Stadium: Centro sportivo Silvio e Luigi Berlusconi - Monzello

4 August 2026 Friendly	Monza (Italy)	4–2	(Italy) Milan Futuro	Monza
CEST 18:00 UTC+2		Report		Stadium: Centro sportivo Silvio e Luigi Berlusconi - Monzello

7 August 2026 Friendly	Monza (Italy)	3–3	(Italy) Padova	Monza
CEST 20:45 UTC+2		Report		Stadium: Stadio Brianteo

26 September 2026 Friendly	Monza (Italy)	2–3	(Italy) Cremonese	Monza
CEST 12:00 UTC+2		Report		Stadium: Centro sportivo Silvio e Luigi Berlusconi - Monzello

3 October 2026 Friendly	Brest (France)	2–2	(Italy) Monza	Monza
CEST 18:00 UTC+2		Report		Stadium: Stade Francis-Le Blé

== Competitions ==
=== Overall record ===
Competition	First match	Last match	Starting round	Final position	Record							
Competition	First match	Last match	Starting round	Final position	Pld	W	D	L	GF	GA	GD	Win %
Serie A	22 August 2026	30 May 2027	Matchday 1	TBD	11	2	1	8	17	25	−8	18.18
Coppa Italia	14 August 2026	TBD	Round of 32	TBD	2	2	0	0	4	0	+4	100.00
Total					13	4	1	8	21	25	−4	30.77

Source: Monza Schedule

=== Serie A ===
==== League table ====
Pos	Team	Pld	W	D	L	GF	GA	GD	Pts	Qualification or relegation
16	Parma	11	2	2	7	9	17	−8	8	
17	Sassuolo	11	2	2	7	16	29	−13	8	
18	Monza	11	2	1	8	17	25	−8	7	Relegation to Serie B
19	Venezia	11	2	0	9	8	21	−13	6	Relegation to Serie B
20	Udinese	11	1	2	8	12	25	−13	5	Relegation to Serie B

Updated to match(es) played on 8 November 2026. Source: Serie A
Rules for classification: 1) Points; 2) Head-to-head points; 3) Head-to-head goal difference; 4) Goal difference; 5) Goals scored; 6) Drawing of lots.
End-of-season ties on points for 1st or 17th are instead decided by a one- or two-leg play-off, respectively, unless the play-off would involve a UEFA competition finalist (in which case rules 2–6 apply). Rules 2–6 determine home advantage (for 17th, the better-ranked team hosts the second leg); if three or more teams are tied, they also select the two play-off teams.

==== Results summary ====
Overall								Home						Away					
Pld	W	D	L	GF	GA	GD	Pts	W	D	L	GF	GA	GD	W	D	L	GF	GA	GD
11	2	1	8	17	25	−8	7	2	0	3	9	9	0	0	1	5	8	16	−8

Last updated: 8 November 2026.
Source: Worldfootball

==== Results by round ====
Round	1	2	3	4	5	6	7	8	9	10	11	12	13	14	15	16	17	18	19	20	21	22	23	24	25	26	27	28	29	30	31	32	33	34	35	36	37	38
Ground	A	H	A	A	H	A	H	A	H	A	H	H	A	H	A	A	H	A	H	A	H	H	A	H	A	H	H	A	H	A	A	H	A	H	A	H	A	H
Result	L	L	D	L	W	L	W	L	L	L	L																											
Position	19	18	17	18	16	16	14	15	16	18	18																											

Updated to match(es) played on 8 November 2026. Source: Worldfootball
A = Away; H = Home; W = Win; D = Draw; L = Loss

==== Matches ====
The league dates were released on 5 June 2026.

22 August 2026 1	Inter Milan	4–1	Monza	Milan
18:30 CEST (UTC+2)	Çalhanoğlu 6', (yellow card) 45+1'; L. Martínez (yellow card) 34'; Zieliński 48'; Esposito 55'; Bisseck 63'	Report	Varela 29'; Kouadio (yellow card) 69'; Lucchesi (yellow card) 84'	Stadium: Stadio San Siro; Attendance: 75,013; Referee: Livio Marinelli

29 August 2026 2	Monza	2–3	Udinese	Monza
18:30 CEST (UTC+2)	Colpani 37'; Lucchesi (yellow card) 46'; Varela 53'		Piotrowski 32'; Kamara 45'; Ekkelenkamp 45+3'	Stadium: Stadio Brianteo; Attendance: 9,057; Referee: Claudio Giuseppe Allegretta

6 September 2026 3	Parma	1–1	Monza	Parma
15:00 CEST (UTC+2)	Lontani 60'; Baldé (yellow card) 66'; Almqvist (yellow card) 83'		Robinson 38'; Folorunsho (yellow card) 41'; Colombo (yellow card) 68'	Stadium: Stadio Ennio Tardini; Attendance: 14,572; Referee: Federico La Penna

13 September 2026 4	Lecce	3–2	Monza	Lecce
15:00 CEST (UTC+2)	Coulibaly 3', 21'; Tiago Gabriel 10'; N'Dri (yellow card) 38'; Veiga (yellow card) 90'		Mangas 20'; Zeballos 89'	Stadium: Stadio Via del Mare; Attendance: 25,764; Referee: Valerio Crezzini

18 September 2026 5	Monza	2–1	Sassuolo	Monza
20:45 CEST	Kouadio (yellow card) 30'; Varela 51', 63' (pen.), (yellow card) 90+2'; Folorunsho (yellow card) 74'; Birindelli (yellow card) 85'		Lipani (yellow card) 85'; Adžić 88'	Stadium: Stadio Brianteo; Attendance: 9,002; Referee: Daniele Perenzoni

11 October 2026 6	Lazio	3–1	Monza	Rome
15:00 CEST	Tavares 3'; Isaksen 23'; Doekhi (yellow card) 45+2'; Provstgaard (yellow card) 55'; Leite (yellow card) 68'; Pinamonti 88'		Carboni (yellow card) 13'; Lucchesi (red card) 35'; Goglichidze 46'	Stadium: Stadio Olimpico; Referee: Giuseppe Collu

19 October 2026 7	Monza	4–0	Cagliari	Monza
15:00 CEST	Kouadio 39'; Varela 47', 79'; Robinson 66'; Birindelli (yellow card) 82'		Winks (yellow card) 76'; Fadera (yellow card) 82'	Stadium: Stadio Brianteo; Attendance: 11,060; Referee: Andrea Calzavara

25 October 2026 8	Torino	3–2	Monza	Turin
15:00 CEST	Ismajli (yellow card) 34'; Fitz-Jim 39'; Belghali 61'; Vlašić 72'		Varela 47'; Patterson 90+4' (o.g.)	Stadium: Stadio Olimpico Grande Torino; Attendance: 19,096; Referee: Matteo Marchetti

28 October 2026 9	Monza	1–4	Napoli	Monza
20:45 CET (UTC+1)	Goglichidze (yellow card) 8'; Varela 43'; Ondoa (yellow card) 52'; Colombo (yellow card) 88'	Report	Højlund 10'; Politano 48'; Marín 62'; De Bruyne 67'	Stadium: Stadio Brianteo; Attendance: 13,694; Referee: Giovanni Ayroldi

31 October 2026 10	Bologna	2–1	Monza	Bologna
15:00 CET	Pobega 33'; Bernardeschi 59' (pen.)		Varela 6' (pen.)	Stadium: Stadio Renato Dall'Ara; Attendance: 25,561; Referee: Andrea Zanotti

8 November 2026 11	Monza	0–1	Atalanta	Monza
15:00 CET			Krstović 49'	Stadium: Stadio Brianteo; Attendance: 12,158; Referee: Claudio Giuseppe Allegretta

22 November 2025 12	Monza	v	Fiorentina	Monza
15:00 CET				Stadium: Stadio Brianteo

29 November 2026 13	Roma	v	Monza	Rome
15:00 CET				Stadium: Stadio Olimpico

6 December 2026 14	Monza	v	Como	Monza
15:00 CET				Stadium: Stadio Brianteo

13 December 2026 15	Juventus	v	Monza	Turin
15:00 CET				Stadium: Juventus Stadium

20 December 2026 16	Venezia	v	Monza	Venice
15:00 CET				Stadium: Stadio Pier Luigi Penzo

3 January 2027 17	Monza	v	AC Milan	Monza
15:00 CET				Stadium: Stadio Brianteo

6 January 2027 18	Genoa	v	Monza	Genoa
15:00 CET				Stadium: Stadio Luigi Ferraris

10 January 2027 19	Monza	v	Frosinone	Monza
15:00 CET				Stadium: Stadio Brianteo

17 January 2027 20	Sassuolo	v	Monza	Reggio Emilia
15:00 CET				Stadium: Mapei Stadium – Città del Tricolore

24 January 2027 21	Monza	v	Lazio	Monza
15:00 CET				Stadium: Stadio Brianteo

31 January 2027 22	Monza	v	Roma	Monza
15:00 CET				Stadium: Stadio Brianteo

7 February 2027 23	Como	v	Monza	Como
15:00 CET				Stadium: Stadio Giuseppe Sinigaglia

14 February 2027 24	Monza	v	Lecce	Monza
15:00 CET				Stadium: Stadio Brianteo

21 February 2027 25	Atalanta	v	Monza	Bergamo
15:00 CET				Stadium: New Balance Arena

28 February 2027 26	Monza	v	Juventus	Monza
15:00 CET				Stadium: Stadio Brianteo

7 March 2027 27	Monza	v	Genoa	Monza
15:00 CET				Stadium: Stadio Brianteo

14 March 2027 28	Frosinone	v	Monza	Frosinone
15:00 CET				Stadium: Stadio Benito Stirpe

21 March 2027 29	Monza	v	Bologna	Monza
15:00 CET				Stadium: Stadio Brianteo

4 April 2027 30	AC Milan	v	Monza	Milan
15:00 CET				Stadium: Stadio San Siro

11 April 2027 31	Udinese	v	Monza	Udine
20:00 CET				Stadium: Stadio Friuli

18 April 2027 32	Monza	v	Inter Milan	Monza
15:00 CET				Stadium: Stadio Brianteo

25 April 2027 33	Cagliari	v	Monza	Cagliari
15:00 CEST				Stadium: Unipol Domus

2 May 2027 34	Monza	v	Venezia	Monza
15:00 CEST				Stadium: Stadio Brianteo

9 May 2027 35	Napoli	v	Monza	Naples
20:30 CEST				Stadium: Stadio Diego Armando Maradona

16 May 2027 36	Monza	v	Parma	Monza
15:00 CEST				Stadium: Stadio Brianteo

23 May 2027 37	Fiorentina	v	Monza	Florence
15:00 CEST				Stadium: Stadio Artemio Franchi

30 May 2027 38	Monza	v	Torino	Monza
15:00 CEST				Stadium: Stadio Brianteo

=== Coppa Italia ===
14 August 2026 First round	Monza	3–0	Avellino	Monza
20:45 CEST (UTC+2)	Varela 22', 45'; Forson 51'	Report		Stadium: Stadio Brianteo; Attendance: 3,229; Referee: Mattia Drigo

1 September 2026 Second round	Torino	0–1	Monza	Turin
21:00 CEST (UTC+2)			Mota 45+3'	Stadium: Stadio Olimpico Grande Torino; Referee: Daniele Perenzoni

2–16 December 2026 Round of 16	Milan	v	Monza	Milan
--:-- CET (UTC+1)		Report		Stadium: San Siro
