= Gustavo Varela =

Gustavo Varela may refer to:

- Gustavo Varela (footballer, born 1978), Uruguayan football winger
- Gustavo Varela (footballer, born 2005), Portuguese football striker
