= Mathis Mout =

Italian footballer (born 2007)

- Mout with Monza in 2026

Personal information
- Date of birth: 6 August 2007 (age 19)
- Place of birth: Italy
- Position: Midfielder

Team information
- Current team: Monza
- Number: 80

Youth career
- Cambiano
- Brugherio
- Pro Sesto
- –2020: Casatese Merate
- 2020–2026: Monza

Senior career*
Years	Team	Apps	(Gls)
2026–	Monza	8	(0)

International career^{‡}
2026–	Italy U20	3	(0)
- * Club domestic league appearances and goals as of 8 November 2026 ‡ National team caps and goals as of 12 November 2026

Mathis Mout (born 6 August 2007) is an Italian professional footballer who plays as a midfielder for Serie A club Monza.

== Early life ==
Mout's father is Italian, and his paternal grandfather was from the Susa Valley in Piedmont, Italy; his mother is French. He holds Italian and French nationality.

== Club career ==
=== Youth ===
Mout began his youth career at Cambiano, in Piedmont, before moving to Lombardy to play for Brugherio, Pro Sesto, and Casatese Merate. At the age of 12, Mout joined Monza's youth academy. He progressed through the club's youth system, playing for the under-17 and under-18 teams, before establishing himself with the Primavera side. On 27 January 2025, Mout scored a hat-trick for Monza's under-18 team in a 3–1 victory over Lazio. During the 2025–26 season, he became a regular member of Monza's Primavera 1 team.

=== AC Monza ===
After being called up to several first-team matches during the 2025–26 Serie B season without making an appearance, Mout was integrated into Monza's first-team squad during the 2026–27 pre-season. He also continued to appear for the club's Primavera team during the summer.

On 14 August 2026, Mout made his competitive first-team debut, starting in Monza's 3–0 victory over Avellino in the Coppa Italia. He played 85 minutes before being replaced by Nicolas Galazzi. He made his Serie A debut on 22 August 2026, starting in Monza's 4–1 defeat to Inter Milan at San Siro. He played 70 minutes and provided the assist for Gustavo Varela's goal, which brought Monza level shortly before half-time.

== Style of play ==
Mout is a left-footed attacking midfielder who primarily plays as a trequartista and was regarded as one of Monza's attacking midfield prospects during his time with the Primavera side. Sky Sport described him as capable of playing as a trequartista, second striker or advanced midfielder. He began playing as a mezzala during the 2025–26 season, having previously operated further forward, and said he felt comfortable in the role.

Mout has cited Monza captain Matteo Pessina as a role model, and has also named Zinedine Zidane and Paulo Dybala among his footballing idols.

== Career statistics ==
=== Club ===
As of match played 22 August 2026

Appearances and goals by club, season and competition
Club	Season	League			Coppa Italia		Total	
Club	Season	Division	Apps	Goals	Apps	Goals	Apps	Goals
Monza	2026–27	Serie A	1	0	1	0	2	0
Career total			1	0	1	0	2	0
