= Leonardo Colombo =

Italian footballer (born 2005)

Personal information
- Date of birth: 4 June 2005 (age 21)
- Place of birth: Busto Arsizio, Italy
- Height: 1.79 m (5 ft 10 in)
- Position: Defensive midfielder

Team information
- Current team: Monza
- Number: 21

Youth career
- Polisportiva Santi Apostoli
- Pro Patria
- Atalanta
- –2018: Pro Sesto
- 2018–2025: Monza

Senior career*
Years	Team	Apps	(Gls)
2024–	Monza	31	(1)

International career^{‡}
2025	Italy U20	2	(0)
- * Club domestic league appearances and goals as of 8 November 2026 ‡ National team caps and goals as of 17 November 2025

Leonardo Colombo (born 4 June 2005) is an Italian professional footballer who plays as a defensive midfielder for Serie A club Monza.

== Club career ==
=== Youth ===
Colombo began playing football with Polisportiva Santi Apostoli in his hometown Busto Arsizio before progressing through the youth systems of Pro Patria, Atalanta, and Pro Sesto, eventually joining Monza's academy in 2018.

After joining Monza, Colombo became a regular for the club's Primavera (under-19) team. He helped the team achieve promotion to the Primavera 1 championship and accumulated 97 appearances and eight goals at youth level.

=== Monza ===
Colombo received his first senior call-up by Monza ahead of their Coppa Italia game against Udinese on 19 October 2022. On 5 January 2023, he signed his first professional contract with Monza. Colombo's official senior debut came in the 2024–25 Coppa Italia round of 16 against Bologna on 3 December 2024, where he started the match. Three days later, on 6 December, Monza extended Colombo's contract until June 2027.

Colombo made his Serie B debut for Monza on 23 August 2025, during the opening match of the 2025–26 season against Mantova; he entered the match in the second half as Monza secured a 1–0 victory. On 19 February 2026, Monza extended Colombo's contract until 30 June 2029. Colombo made 27 league appearances and scored once during the regular season, starting 11 matches, before making three further appearances in the promotion play-offs, as Monza secured promotion to Serie A.

== International career ==
Colombo played for the Italy national under-20 team, making two appearances in 2025. In May 2026, he was called up to the Italy under-21 team for a friendly against Albania on 8 June, but was subsequently ruled unavailable and replaced in the squad by Federico Cassa.

== Style of play ==
Colombo primarily plays as a defensive midfielder, although he has also been deployed as a central midfielder and centre-back. He has been compared to Monza midfielder Matteo Pessina.

== Career statistics ==
=== Club ===
As of match played 29 May 2026

Appearances and goals by club, season and competition
Club	Season	League			Coppa Italia		Other		Total	
Club	Season	Division	Apps	Goals	Apps	Goals	Apps	Goals	Apps	Goals
Monza	2024–25	Serie A	0	0	1	0	—		1	0
Monza	2025–26	Serie B	27	1	1	0	3 (Note: Appearances in Serie B promotion play-offs)	0	31	1
Monza	2026–27	Serie A	0	0	0	0	—		0	0
Monza	Total		27	1	2	0	3	0	32	1
Career total			27	1	2	0	3	0	32	1
