= Alessandro Bastoni =

Italian footballer (born 1999)

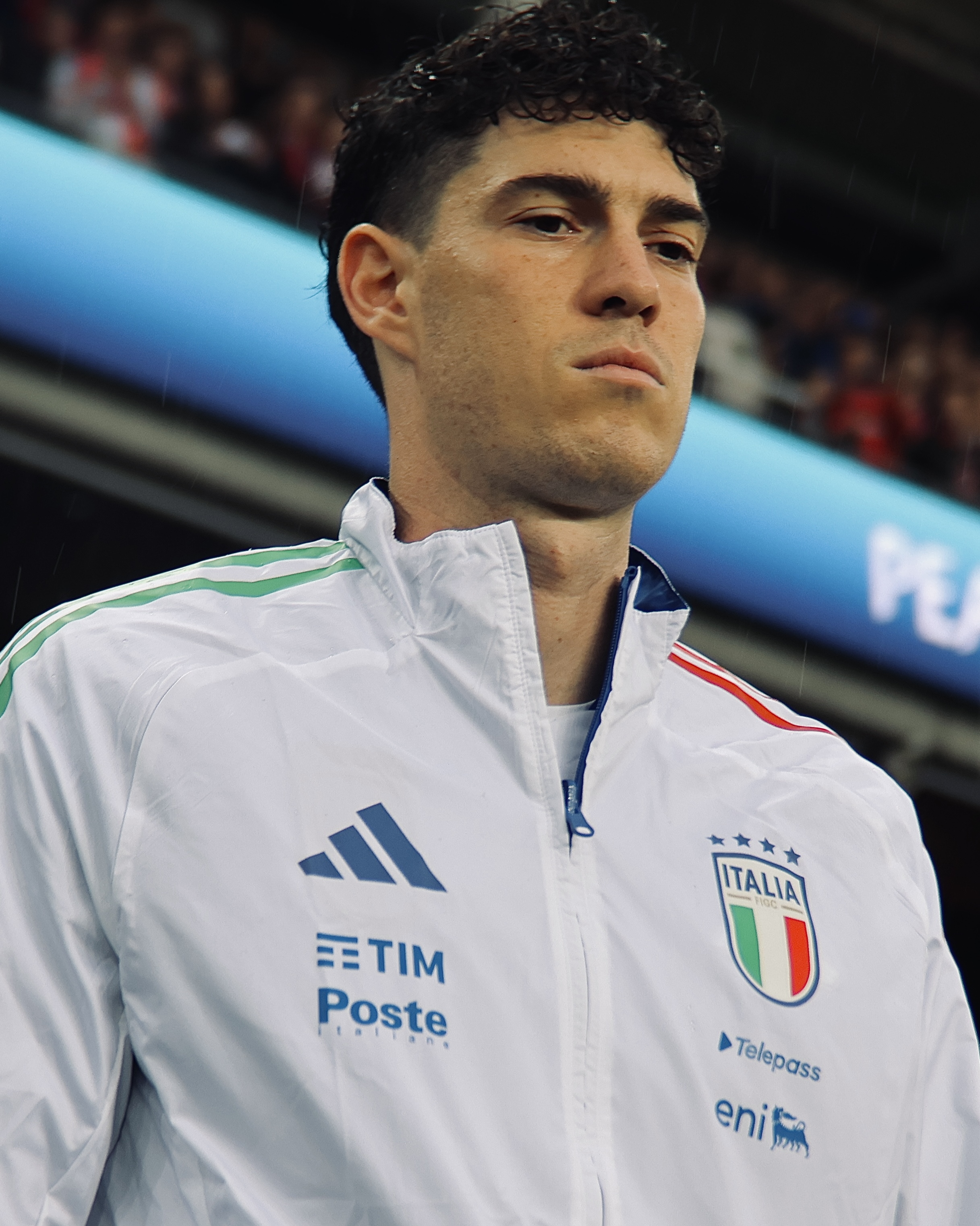
- Bastoni with Italy in 2025

Personal information
- Full name: Alessandro Bastoni
- Date of birth: 13 April 1999 (age 27)
- Place of birth: Casalmaggiore, Italy
- Height: 1.90 m (6 ft 3 in)
- Position: Centre-back

Team information
- Current team: Inter Milan
- Number: 95

Youth career
- 2006–2016: Atalanta

Senior career*
Years	Team	Apps	(Gls)
2016–2017	Atalanta	3	(0)
2017–	Inter Milan	218	(7)
2017–2018	→ Atalanta (loan)	4	(0)
2018–2019	→ Parma (loan)	24	(1)

International career^{‡}
2014	Italy U15	7	(0)
2014–2015	Italy U16	15	(1)
2015–2016	Italy U17	17	(0)
2016	Italy U18	3	(0)
2017–2018	Italy U19	9	(2)
2018–2019	Italy U21	12	(1)
2020–	Italy	48	(5)
Medal record
Men's Football
Representing Italy
UEFA European Championship
Winner	2020 Europe
UEFA Nations League
Third place	2021 Italy
CONMEBOL–UEFA Cup of Champions
Runner-up	2022 England
- * Club domestic league appearances and goals as of 22 November 2026 ‡ National team caps and goals as of 15 November 2026

Alessandro Bastoni (born 13 April 1999) is an Italian professional footballer who plays primarily as a centre-back for Serie A club Inter Milan and the Italy national team. Regarded as one of the best centre-backs in the world, he is best known for his passing, speed, and versatility.

== Early life ==
Bastoni was born in Casalmaggiore, Lombardy, and began his career in the local Rivarolo Mantovano youth side, where his father was coach. At the age of 7, he joined the youth side of Serie A club Atalanta.

== Club career ==
=== Atalanta ===
Bastoni progressed through various age groups at Bergamo, including making nearly 30 appearances for the under-17 side, before eventually progressing to the Primavera side, where he established himself as a regular starter at the centre of defence. He was named on the first-team bench for the first time on 30 October 2016, for the game against Genoa, and made his full debut a month later in the Coppa Italia game against Pescara, playing the full game in a 3–0 victory. In Serie A, Bastoni remained as an unused substitute for the six games after Genoa until making his debut in a 1–0 win over Sampdoria on 22 January 2017, playing full 90 minutes.

=== Inter Milan ===
On 31 August 2017, Inter Milan announced the signing of Bastoni for €31 million, and on the same day, his loan at Atalanta for the next two seasons. Inter officially recalled defender Alessandro Bastoni early from his loan with Atalanta and renewed his contract until 2023 on 14 July 2018.

==== Loan to Parma ====
On 7 August 2018, Bastoni joined Parma on loan until 30 June 2019. He made his debut on 7 October 2018, in the league match won 3–1 away against Genoa.

==== Inter return ====
On 30 August 2026, Bastoni made his 300th Inter appearance in all competitions in the 1–0 win at Cagliari in the 2nd matchday of 2026–27 Serie A.

== International career ==
=== Youth ===
Bastoni has been capped by Italy at every level from U15 to U19. His first international goal came in a 4–0 victory against Norway whilst playing for the under-16 team. He was first called up to the under-18 side by coach Paolo Nicolato in August 2016. On 11 October 2018, Bastoni made his debut with the Italy U21 team in a 1–0 friendly loss against Belgium. He became immediately a starter and took part in the 2019 UEFA European Under-21 Championship on home soil.

=== Senior ===
In September 2020, Bastoni received his first call up to the senior Italy squad from coach Roberto Mancini for UEFA Nations League matches against Bosnia Herzegovina and the Netherlands. He made his senior debut for Italy on 11 November, starting in a 4–0 friendly victory against Estonia in Florence.

In June 2021, Bastoni was included in Italy's squad for UEFA Euro 2020. He made his first and only appearance of the tournament in Italy's final group match, starting in a 1–0 victory against Wales in Rome on 20 June, resulting in the country to finish on top of their group. On 11 July, Bastoni won the European Championship with Italy following a 3–2 penalty shoot-out victory against England at Wembley Stadium in the final after a 1–1 draw in extra-time. On 14 June 2022, in Italy's fourth group match of the UEFA Nations League, Bastoni scored his first international goal in a 5–2 away loss against Germany.

In June 2024, Bastoni was included in Italy's final squad for UEFA Euro 2024 by manager Luciano Spalletti. On 15 June, in Italy's opening group match of the tournament against Albania, he scored Italy's temporary equaliser as they came from behind to win the match 2–1. Italy was eliminated from the tournament in the round of 16 following a 2–0 loss to Switzerland. Italy was eliminated from the World Cup after he received a red card in the playoff final, where Bosnia eventually defeated Italy on penalties.

== Style of play ==
A left–footed defender, Bastoni started his career as a full-back, but is also capable of playing as a centre-back, a role in which he became increasingly deployed as his career progressed. He is mainly known for his passing ability and ball control, while his height and ability to exploit spaces allows him to be effective in the air, which makes him a goal threat from indirect set–pieces. Regarded as a promising young player in the media, in 2020, he was included in the list of "Fifty for the future: UEFA.com's ones to watch." Known for his ability to time his challenges and his calmness under pressure, in 2024 he was included in 90min.com's list of "the 25 best centre-backs in world football."

During Simone Inzaghi's time as a manager at Inter Milan, Bastoni became a starting left center-back in the 3–5–2 formation and formed a formidable partnership with a left wing-back Federico Dimarco, which the two carried over into the national team. Despite his nominal role of a defender playing in the back-three, Bastoni often makes overlapping runs on the left side, linking up with either Dimarco or other players in close proximity, and is capable of providing bending crosses into the opposition's penalty area, which led him to assist a number of his team's goals. He has also been used as a left-sided wide midfielder on occasion, giving him more license to roam forward and provide his team with crosses.

Due to high presence of other left-footed center-backs in the national team, namely Francesco Acerbi, Alessandro Buongiorno, and Riccardo Calafiori, Bastoni also plays in the middle of a back-three or even as a right-sided center-back in the back-four. When playing in this role, he is usually compared to Leonardo Bonucci due to his ability to provide accurate long passes from the back.

== Personal life ==
Bastoni's father, Nicola, was also a footballer, who played as a left–back for Cremonese. On 21 January 2022, Bastoni's long-time partner gave birth to a daughter.

Bastoni was under investigation by the Guardia di Finanza in July 2026 for alleged involvement in prostitution – with a 17-year-old through a high-end escort service catering to Serie A players – six years prior.

== Career statistics ==
=== Club ===
As of match played 22 November 2026

Appearances and goals by club, season and competition
Club	Season	League			Coppa Italia		Europe		Other		Total	
Club	Season	Division	Apps	Goals	Apps	Goals	Apps	Goals	Apps	Goals	Apps	Goals
Atalanta	2016–17	Serie A	3	0	1	0	—		—		4	0
Atalanta (loan)	2017–18	Serie A	4	0	1	0	0	0	—		5	0
Atalanta (loan)	Atalanta total		7	0	2	0	0	0	—		9	0
Parma (loan)	2018–19	Serie A	24	1	0	0	—		—		24	1
Inter Milan	2019–20	Serie A	25	2	3	0	5 (Note: Appearances in UEFA Europa League)	0	—		33	2
Inter Milan	2020–21	Serie A	33	0	2	0	6 (Note: Appearances in UEFA Champions League)	0	—		41	0
Inter Milan	2021–22	Serie A	31	1	4	0	8	0	1 (Note: Appearance in Supercoppa Italiana)	0	44	1
Inter Milan	2022–23	Serie A	29	0	4	0	12	0	1	0	46	0
Inter Milan	2023–24	Serie A	28	1	1	0	7	0	1	0	37	1
Inter Milan	2024–25	Serie A	33	1	4	0	14	0	6 (Note: Two appearances in Supercoppa Italiana, four appearances and one goal in FIFA Club World Cup)	1	57	2
Inter Milan	2025–26	Serie A	28	1	2	0	9	1	1	0	40	2
Inter Milan	2026–27	Serie A	11	1	0	0	3	0	0	0	14	1
Inter Milan	Total		218	7	20	0	64	1	10	1	312	9
Career total			249	8	22	0	64	1	10	1	345	10

=== International ===
As of match played 15 November 2026

Appearances and goals by national team and year
National team	Year	Apps	Goals
Italy	2020	3	0
Italy	2021	6	0
Italy	2022	8	1
Italy	2023	4	0
Italy	2024	12	1
Italy	2025	8	1
Italy	2026	7	2
Total		48	5

Italy score listed first, score column indicates score after each Bastoni goal.

List of international goals scored by Alessandro Bastoni
No.	Date	Venue	Cap	Opponent	Score	Result	Competition
1	14 June 2022	Borussia-Park, Mönchengladbach, Germany	15	Germany	2–5	2–5	2022–23 UEFA Nations League A
2	15 June 2024	Westfalenstadion, Dortmund, Germany	24	Albania	1–1	2–1	UEFA Euro 2024
3	5 September 2025	Stadio Atleti Azzurri d'Italia, Bergamo, Italy	38	Estonia	5–0	5–0	2026 FIFA World Cup qualification
4	28 September 2026	Centennial Atatürk Stadium, Bursa, Turkey	44	Turkey	1–0	4–1	2026–27 UEFA Nations League A
5	2 October 2026	Stade de France, Saint-Denis, France	45	France	1–1	1–1	2026–27 UEFA Nations League A

== Honours ==
Inter Milan

- Serie A: 2020–21, 2023–24, 2025–26
- Coppa Italia: 2021–22, 2022–23, 2025–26
- Supercoppa Italiana: 2021, 2022, 2023
- UEFA Champions League runner-up: 2022–23, 2024–25
- UEFA Europa League runner-up: 2019–20

Italy

- UEFA European Championship: 2020
- UEFA Nations League third place: 2020–21

Individual

- Serie A Team of the Year: 2020–21, 2022–23, 2023–24, 2024–25, 2025–26
- UEFA Champions League Team of the Season: 2022–23, 2024–25
- Serie A Player of the Month: March 2024
- Serie A Best Defender: 2023–24, 2024–25
- EA Sports FC Serie A Team of the Season: 2023–24, 2024–25

=== Orders ===
- 5th Class / Knight: Cavaliere Ordine al Merito della Repubblica Italiana: 2021
