= Aljaž Strajnar =

Slovenian footballer (born 2007)

Personal information
- Date of birth: 16 August 2007 (age 19)
- Place of birth: Ljubljana, Slovenia
- Position: Goalkeeper

Team information
- Current team: Monza
- Number: 43

Youth career
- 2011–2012: Olimpija Ljubljana
- 2012–2023: Domžale
- 2023–2025: Mura
- 2025–: Monza

Senior career*
Years	Team	Apps	(Gls)
2025	Mura	10	(0)
2025–	Monza	0	(0)

International career^{‡}
2021–2022	Slovenia U15	4	(0)
2022	Slovenia U16	2	(0)
2023	Slovenia U17	1	(0)
2024–2025	Slovenia U18	2	(0)
2025–	Slovenia U19	3	(0)
- * Club domestic league appearances and goals as of 16 August 2025 ‡ National team caps and goals as of 14 October 2025

Aljaž Strajnar (born 16 August 2007) is a Slovenian professional footballer who plays as a goalkeeper for Serie A club Monza.

Strajnar previously played for Mura, where he made his senior debut in the Prva Liga aged 17. He is a Slovenia youth international since 2021.

== Early life ==
Strajnar was born in Ljubljana on 16 August 2007. He comes from a footballing family. His father, Janez Strajnar, was a goalkeeper who made 421 appearances in the Slovenian top flight and represented Slovenia once, while his older brother Mark Strajnar also became a professional footballer. Aljaž and Mark grew up in Domžale, where their father had settled after his playing career.

== Club career ==
=== Youth ===
Strajnar began playing football at the age of five with Olimpija Ljubljana, before joining Domžale after entering primary school. During the 2022–23 UEFA Youth League, he made his debut in the competition for Domžale in their two-legged tie against Young Boys. In July 2023, Strajnar joined Mura, initially playing in the club's youth teams. During the 2024–25 season he played in the NextGen League before being promoted to the senior squad.

=== Mura ===
Strajnar made his PrvaLiga debut for Mura on 28 April 2025 against Bravo. His appearance came 5,819 days after his father Janez had made his final appearance in the Slovenian top flight, also making Aljaž the first member of the Strajnar family to appear in the competition since his father. He was subsequently given further opportunities in the Mura first team. In May 2025, Strajnar started two league matches due to first-choice goalkeeper Florijan Raduha being unavailable through a minor injury.

Strajnar ended his time at Mura with ten appearances in the Prva Liga.

=== Monza ===
On 19 August 2025, Strajnar moved to Italian club Monza on a contract running until 30 June 2029. The transfer was reported to be worth around €300,000, with the final amount potentially increasing through bonuses. Mura also retained a percentage of any future transfer. Monza stated that Strajnar would initially be involved with their Primavera youth side while also training with the senior team.

== International career ==
Strajnar has represented Slovenia at under-15, under-16, under-17, under-18, and under-19 level. He made his under-15 debut in 2021, followed by appearances for the under-16 team in 2022, the under-17 team in 2023, the under-18 team in 2024 and the under-19 team in 2025. As of August 2026, he had made 12 youth international appearances for Slovenia across the five age groups.

== Career statistics ==
=== Club ===
As of match played 16 August 2025

Appearances and goals by club, season and competition
Club	Season	League			National cup (Note: Includes Slovenian Cup, Coppa Italia)		Other		Total	
Club	Season	Division	Apps	Goals	Apps	Goals	Apps	Goals	Apps	Goals
NŠ Mura	2024–25	Slovenian PrvaLiga	5	0	0	0	—		5	0
NŠ Mura	2025–26	Slovenian PrvaLiga	5	0	0	0	—		5	0
NŠ Mura	Total		10	0	0	0	0	0	10	0
Monza	2025–26	Serie B	0	0	0	0	0	0	0	0
Monza	2026–27	Serie A	0	0	0	0	—		0	0
Monza	Total		0	0	0	0	0	0	0	0
Career total			10	0	0	0	0	0	10	0

== See also ==
- List of association football families of former Yugoslavia
