= Oscar Brevi =

Italian footballer and manager

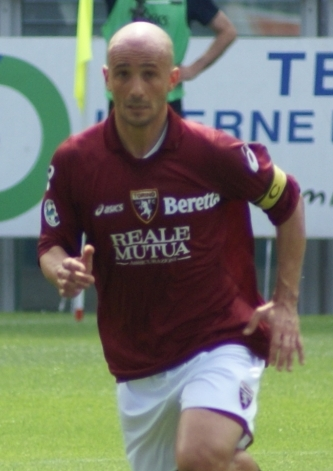

Personal information
- Date of birth: 15 December 1967 (age 58)
- Place of birth: Milan, Italy
- Height: 1.82 m (6 ft 0 in)
- Position: Defender

Team information
- Current team: Monza U19 (head coach)

Youth career
- Pisa

Senior career*
Years	Team	Apps	(Gls)
1987–1988	Bariviera	0	(0)
1988–1989	Trezzano	0	(0)
1989–1990	Castanese	0	(0)
1990–1994	Gallaratese	91	(5)
1994–1995	Corsico	31	(1)
1995–1997	Solbiatese	63	(3)
1997–2000	Lumezzane	90	(3)
2000–2002	Como	66	(3)
2002–2003	Palermo	16	(0)
2002–2003	Como	11	(0)
2003–2005	Ascoli	70	(2)
2005–2007	Torino	59	(1)
2007–2008	Venezia	28	(1)
2008–2009	Como	33	(1)
Total		558	(20)

Managerial career
- 2009–2010: Como
- 2010–2011: Como (assistant)
- 2011–2012: Cremonese
- 2013–2014: Catanzaro
- 2014: SPAL
- 2015: Torres
- 2015–2016: Rimini
- 2016–2017: Padova
- 2017–2018: Fano
- 2018: Renate
- 2019–2020: Olbia
- 2020–2021: Giana Erminio
- 2022–2023: Vis Pesaro
- 2024–: Monza U19
- * Club domestic league appearances and goals

Oscar Brevi (born 15 December 1967) is an Italian professional football manager and former player who is the under-19 coach of Italian club Monza. He played as a defender.

== Career ==
=== Player ===
Brevi from 1995 to 2009 has played for Solbiatese, Lumezzane, Como, Palermo, Ascoli, Torino and Venezia.

=== Coach ===
On 20 October 2009 he was named, together with Ottavio Strano, to replace Stefano Di Chiara as Como new head coach, thus putting an end to his playing career.

In the 2011–12 season he was appointed as the head coach of Lega Pro Prima Divisione side Cremonese; he also served as the team's coach in the next season, until 25 September 2012, when he was sacked.

He was appointed head coach of Serie C club Renate on 5 June 2018. He was fired on 15 October 2018, with Renate in 14th place.

On 14 December 2020, Brevi returned into management as the new head coach of Serie C club Giana Erminio. He was fired by Giana Erminio on 10 November 2021, with the club in 17th place in the standings.

He successively served as head coach of Serie C club Vis Pesaro from December 2022 to April 2023.

In March 2024, Brevi was named the new Under-19 coach of Monza.

== Personal life ==
Oscar's younger brother Ezio is a former Serie A football player and former head coach of Voluntas Spoleto in Serie D.
