= Solomon Loubao =

French footballer (born 2006)

Personal information
- Date of birth: 3 December 2005 (age 20)
- Place of birth: Bagnolet, France
- Height: 1.81 m (5 ft 11 in)
- Position: Forward

Team information
- Current team: Catanzaro (on loan from Monza)
- Number: 44

Youth career
- –2023: FC Nogentais
- 2023–2024: Sochaux

Senior career*
Years	Team	Apps	(Gls)
2023–2025	Sochaux B	25	(6)
2024–2026	Sochaux	29	(2)
2026–	Monza	0	(0)
2026	→ Sochaux B (loan)	3	(1)
2026	→ Sochaux (loan)	1	(0)
2026–	→ Catanzaro (loan)	0	(0)
- * Club domestic league appearances and goals as of 9 May 2026

Solomon Loubao (born 3 December 2005) is a French professional footballer who plays as a forward for Serie B club Catanzaro, on loan from Monza.

== Career ==
A youth product of FC Nogentais, Loubao joined the youth system of Sochaux in 2023. He signed his first professional contract with the club on 29 July 2024, on a three-year deal, after progressing through the club's youth teams and making appearances for its reserve side.

Loubao made his senior debut for Sochaux in the Championnat National during the 2024–25 season. He subsequently established himself in the first team, making 29 league appearances and scoring two goals before his move abroad. In January 2026, Loubao was suspended for two matches by the Ligue de Football Professionnel's disciplinary commission for violating regulations concerning sports betting.

On 28 January 2026, Loubao signed for Italian club Monza, on a contract running until June 2030. He was promptly loaned him back to Sochaux for the remainder of the 2025–26 season. Loubao finished his Sochaux career with 40 appearances for the club in all competitions.

On 1 September 2026, Loubao was sent on a one-year loan to Serie B club Catanzaro.

== Personal life ==
Born in Bagnolet, France, Loubaou is of Ivorian descent.

== Career statistics ==
As of match played 9 May 2026

Appearances and goals by club, season and competition
Club	Season	League			National cup (Note: Includes Coupe de France, Coppa Italia)		Total	
Club	Season	Division	Apps	Goals	Apps	Goals	Apps	Goals
Sochaux B	2022–23	National 3	2	1	—		2	1
Sochaux B	2023–24	National 3	14	0	—		14	0
Sochaux B	2024–25	National 3	8	5	—		8	5
Sochaux B	2025–26	National 3	1	0	—		1	0
Sochaux B	Total		25	6	0	0	25	6
Sochaux	2024–25	National	15	0	4	1	19	1
Sochaux	2025–26	National	14	2	6	2	20	4
Sochaux			29	2	10	3	39	5
Monza	2026–27	Serie A	0	0	0	0	0	0
Sochaux B (loan)	2025–26	National 3	3	1	—		3	1
Sochaux (loan)	2025–26	National	1	0	—		1	0
Career total			58	9	10	3	68	12
