= 2026–27 Coppa Italia =

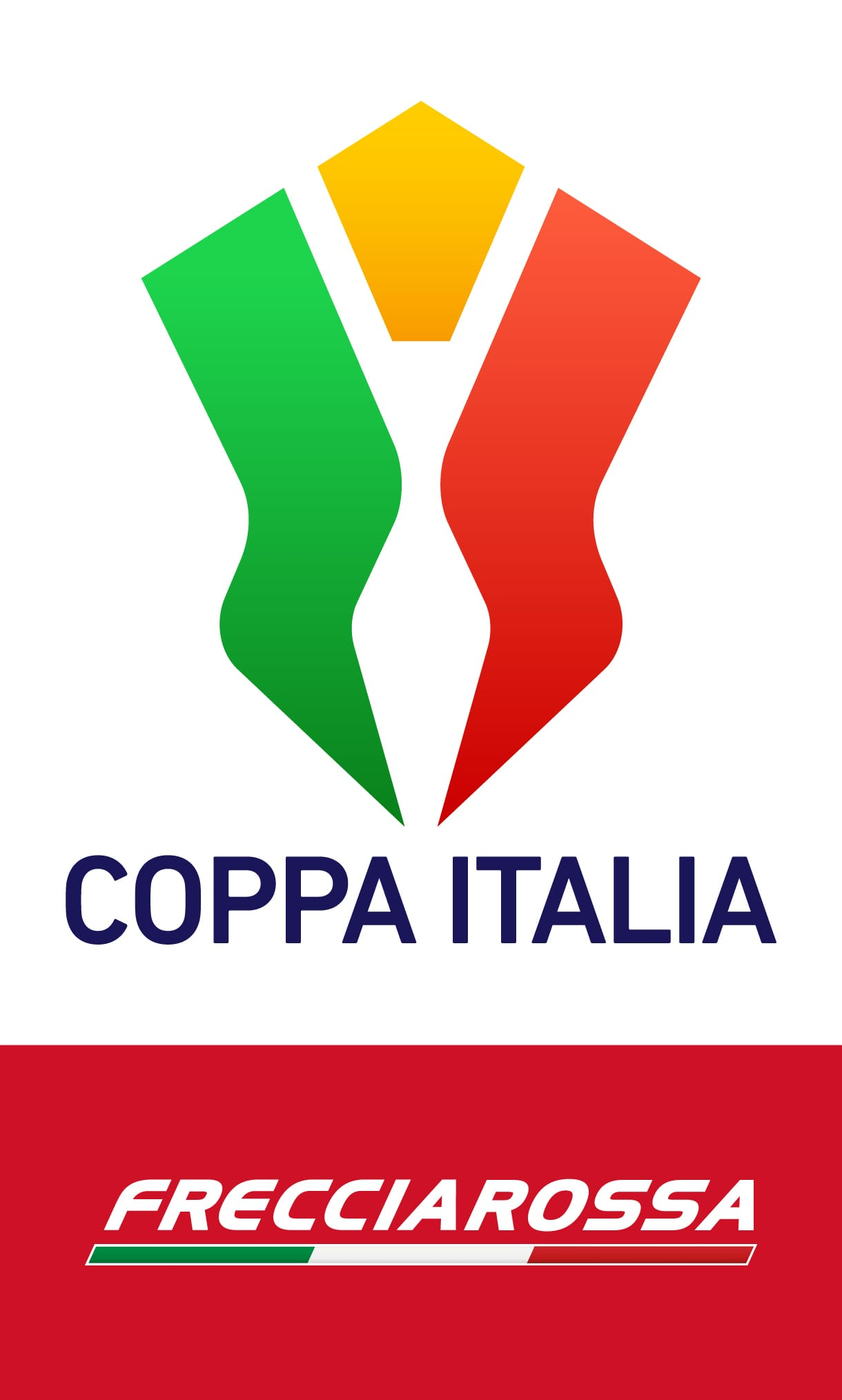

Tournament details
- Country: Italy
- Dates: 8 August 2026 – 19 May 2027
- Teams: 44

Tournament statistics
- Matches played: 28
- Goals scored: 85 (3.04 per match)
- Top goal scorer(s): Joel Pohjanpalo (3 goals)
- All statistics correct as of 15 September 2026.

The 2026–27 Coppa Italia (branded as the Coppa Italia Frecciarossa for sponsorship reasons) is the 80th edition of the national domestic tournament. There are 44 participating teams.

Inter Milan are the defending champions, having won their tenth title in the previous edition after defeating Lazio 2–0 in the final.

Times up to 24 October 2026 and from 28 March 2027 are CEST (UTC+2). Times from 25 October 2026 to 27 March 2027 are CET (UTC+1).

== Format and seeding ==
Teams entered the competition at various stages, as follows:

- First phase (one-legged fixtures)
  - Preliminary round: the four teams from Serie C and four Serie B teams started the tournament
  - First round: the four winners were joined by the remaining 16 Serie B teams, and 12 teams from Serie A
  - Second round: the 16 winners faced each other
- Second phase
  - Round of 16 (one-legged): the eight winners were joined by Serie A clubs, seeded 1–8 (last year winners Inter Milan and clubs ranked 2–8 in the 2025–26 Serie A)
  - Quarter-finals (one-legged): the eight winners face each other
  - Semi-finals (two-legged): the four winners face each other
  - Final (one-legged): the two winners face each other

== Round dates ==
Phase	Round	Clubs remaining	Clubs involved	From previous round	Entries in this round	First leg	Second leg
First stage	Preliminary round	44	8	none	8	8–9 August 2026	
First stage	First round	40	32	4	28	14–17 August 2026	
First stage	Second round	24	16	16	none	1–15 September 2026	
Second stage	Round of 16	16	16	8	8	2–16 December 2026	
Second stage	Quarter-finals	8	8	8	none	3–10 February 2027	
Second stage	Semi-finals	4	4	4	none	2–3 March 2027	20–21 April 2027
Second stage	Final	2	2	2	none	19 May 2027	

== Participating teams ==
Serie A The 20 clubs of the 2026–27 season	Serie B The 20 clubs of the 2026–27 season	Serie C Four clubs of the 2026–27 season
Atalanta; Bologna; Cagliari; Como; Fiorentina; Frosinone; Genoa; Inter Milan; Juventus; Lazio; Lecce; AC Milan; Monza; Napoli; Parma; Roma; Sassuolo; Torino; Udinese; Venezia	Arezzo; Ascoli; Avellino; Benevento; Carrarese; Catanzaro; Cesena; Cremonese; Empoli; Hellas Verona; Juve Stabia; Mantova; Modena; Padova; Palermo; Pisa; Sampdoria; Südtirol; Vicenza; Virtus Entella	Catania; Potenza; Ravenna; Union Brescia

== First stage ==
=== Preliminary round ===
Eight teams from Serie B and Serie C competed in this round, with the four winners advancing to the first round.

Number of teams per tier still in the competition
Serie A (Note: Serie A teams joined the competition in the first and second round.)	Serie B (Note: Serie B teams joined the competition in the first round.)	Serie C	Total
13 / 20	3 / 20	0 / 4	16 / 44

8 August 2026	Vicenza (2)	1–1 (3–4 p)	Catania (3)	Vicenza
20:00 CEST	Moncini 25'	Report	Cicerelli 39' (pen.)	Stadium: Stadio Romeo Menti; Attendance: 5,053; Referee: Gianluca Renz
	Penalties
	Costa (penalty missed); Leverbe (penalty scored); Rauti (penalty scored); Valoti (penalty scored); Morra (penalty missed)		(penalty scored) Caturano; (penalty scored) Jiménez; (penalty scored) Rolfini; (penalty missed) Di Tacchio; (penalty scored) Quaini

8 August 2026	Ascoli (2)	3–1	Potenza (3)	Ascoli Piceno
20:30 CEST	Milanese 21'; Gori 69'; Corradini 90'	Report	Selleri 1'	Stadium: Stadio Cino e Lillo Del Duca; Attendance: 6,115; Referee: Juan Luca Sacchi

9 August 2026	Arezzo (2)	2–0	Union Brescia (3)	Arezzo
19:45 CEST	Arena 24'; Tavernelli 86'	Report		Stadium: Stadio Città di Arezzo; Attendance: 3,465; Referee: Fabio Luongo

9 August 2026	Benevento (2)	5–3	Ravenna (3)	Benevento
21:00 CEST	Prisco 15'; Salvemini 39' (pen.), 90+1'; Romano 61'; Scognamillo 71'	Report	Vinícius 3', 53'; Maggio 14'	Stadium: Stadio Ciro Vigorito; Attendance: 2,580; Referee: Leonardo Mastrodomenico

=== First round ===
32 teams (4 winners from the preliminary round, the remaining 16 teams from Serie B and 12 Serie A teams seeded 9–20) competed in this round, with the 16 winners advancing to the second round.

14 August 2026	Parma (1)	2–0	Catania (3)	Parma
18:00 CEST	Lontani 19', 35'	Report		Stadium: Stadio Ennio Tardini; Attendance: 4,210; Referee: Valerio Crezzini

14 August 2026	Cagliari (1)	1–0	Arezzo (2)	Cagliari
18:30 CEST	Deiola 23' (pen.)	Report		Stadium: Unipol Domus; Attendance: 8,730; Referee: Andrea Calzavara

14 August 2026	Monza (1)	3–0	Avellino (2)	Monza
20:45 CEST	Varela 23', 45+1'; Forson 51'	Report		Stadium: Stadio Brianteo; Attendance: 3,229; Referee: Mattia Drigo

14 August 2026	Fiorentina (1)	4–1	Benevento (2)	Florence
21:15 CEST	Guðmundsson 2'; Kean 35'; Ranieri 48'; Ndour 50'	Report	Lamesta 54'	Stadium: Stadio Artemio Franchi; Attendance: 16,626; Referee: Gianluca Manganiello

15 August 2026	Catanzaro (2)	2–2 (3–4 p)	Südtirol (2)	Catanzaro
18:00 CEST	Pafundi 27'; Iemmello 53'	Report	Pyyhtiä 17'; Mixtur 87'	Stadium: Stadio Nicola Ceravolo; Attendance: 3,202; Referee: Claudio Allegretta
	Penalties
	Petriccione (penalty scored); Buso (penalty scored); Frosinini (penalty missed); Arditi (penalty scored); Dorval (penalty missed)		(penalty missed) Stivanello; (penalty scored) Lopes; (penalty scored) Casiraghi; (penalty scored) Molina; (penalty scored) Davì

15 August 2026	Udinese (1)	1–0	Padova (2)	Udine
18:30 CEST	Davis 35'	Report		Stadium: Stadio Friuli; Attendance: 4,247; Referee: Antonio Rapuano

15 August 2026	Venezia (1)	3–2	Modena (2)	Venice
20:45 CEST	Adams 26', 85'; Yeboah 83'	Report	Ambrosino 17', 39'	Stadium: Stadio Pier Luigi Penzo; Attendance: 9,327; Referee: Maria Sole Ferrieri Caputi

15 August 2026	Torino (1)	1–0	Carrarese (2)	Turin
21:15 CEST	Simeone 9'	Report		Stadium: Stadio Olimpico Grande Torino; Attendance: 8,542; Referee: Paride Tremolada

16 August 2026	Frosinone (1)	4–1	Juve Stabia (2)	Frosinone
18:00 CEST	Kvernadze 20', 71'; Cichella 29'; Raimondo 38'	Report	Candellone 48'	Stadium: Stadio Benito Stirpe; Attendance: 3,475; Referee: Marco Di Loreto

16 August 2026	Genoa (1)	4–1	Ascoli (2)	Genoa
18:30 CEST	Marcandalli 42'; Baldanzi 45'; Colombo 61'; Havel 80'	Report	Silipo 25'	Stadium: Stadio Luigi Ferraris; Attendance: 13,000; Referee: Mario Perri

16 August 2026	Hellas Verona (2)	2–2 (3–2 p)	Virtus Entella (2)	Verona
20:45 CEST	Compagnon 20'; Sarr 36'	Report	Guiu 16'; Franzoni 85' (pen.)	Stadium: Stadio Marcantonio Bentegodi; Attendance: 7,559; Referee: Edoardo Mazzoni
	Penalties
	Mulattieri (penalty scored); Kastanos (penalty scored); Bernède (penalty missed); Edmundsson (penalty scored)		(penalty scored) Lucas Felippe; (penalty missed) Guiu; (penalty scored) Franzoni; (penalty missed) Corona; (penalty missed) Tirelli

16 August 2026	Lazio (1)	0–2	Mantova (2)	Rome
21:15 CEST		Report	Ruocco 75'; Cajazzo 90+6'	Stadium: Stadio Olimpico; Attendance: 6,286; Referee: Giuseppe Mucera

17 August 2026	Pisa (2)	1–1 (4–3 p)	Empoli (2)	Pisa
18:00 CEST	Marras 44'	Report	Saporiti 61'	Stadium: Arena Garibaldi; Attendance: 7,003; Referee: Andrea Zanotti
	Penalties
	Marras (penalty scored); Meister (penalty scored); Rao (penalty scored); Loyola (penalty scored)		(penalty missed) Magnino; (penalty scored) Shpendi; (penalty scored) Popov; (penalty scored) Romagnoli; (penalty missed) Saporiti

17 August 2026	Sassuolo (1)	3–0	Cesena (2)	Reggio Emilia
18:30 CEST	Volpato 13'; Adžić 45+2'; Lipani 75'	Report		Stadium: Mapei Stadium – Città del Tricolore; Attendance: 4,500; Referee: Niccolò Turrini

17 August 2026	Cremonese (2)	2–0	Sampdoria (2)	Bolzano
20:45 CEST	Stückler 23'; Berti 90+3'	Report		Stadium: Stadio Druso; Attendance: 1,048; Referee: Daniele Perenzoni

17 August 2026	Palermo (2)	2–0	Lecce (1)	Palermo
21:15 CEST	Vavassori 14'; Pohjanpalo 42'	Report		Stadium: Stadio Renzo Barbera; Attendance: 33,009; Referee: Alberto Ruben Arena

=== Second round ===
The 16 winning teams from the first round competed in the second round, with the eight winners advancing to the round of 16.

1 September 2026	Parma (1)	0−2	Cremonese (2)	Parma
18:00 CEST		Report	Lottici Tessadri 5'; Ličina 41'	Stadium: Stadio Ennio Tardini; Attendance: 4,569; Referee: Kevin Bonacina

1 September 2026	Torino (1)	0−1	Monza (1)	Turin
21:00 CEST		Report	Mota 45+3'	Stadium: Stadio Olimpico Grande Torino; Attendance: 7,970; Referee: Daniele Perenzoni

2 September 2026	Sassuolo (1)	1–1 (4–3 p)	Frosinone (1)	Reggio Emilia
15:00 CEST	Domínguez 36'	Report	Terzić 45+2'	Stadium: Mapei Stadium – Città del Tricolore; Attendance: 1,391; Referee: Andrea Calzavara
	Penalties
	Berardi (penalty scored); Esposito (penalty scored); Thorstvedt (penalty scored); Bakola (penalty scored)		(penalty scored) Bobček; (penalty scored) Fayed; (penalty scored) Zerbin; (penalty missed) Amey; (penalty missed) Hasa

2 September 2026	Udinese (1)	2–1	Venezia (1)	Udine
18:00 CEST	Bayo 34', 53'	Report	Sagrado 9'	Stadium: Stadio Friuli; Attendance: 3,871; Referee: Matteo Marchetti

3 September 2026	Palermo (2)	5–2	Mantova (2)	Palermo
18:00 CEST	Strefezza 9'; Palumbo 45+6' (pen.); Pohjanpalo 70', 90+5'; Johnsen 89'	Report	Ruocco 52'; Kouda 55'	Stadium: Stadio Renzo Barbera; Attendance: 23,133; Referee: Davide Di Marco

3 September 2026	Cagliari (1)	1–2	Hellas Verona (2)	Cagliari
21:00 CEST	Mendy 57'	Report	Harroui 23'; Mulattieri 87'	Stadium: Unipol Domus; Attendance: 14,971; Referee: Andrea Zanotti

15 September 2026	Genoa (1)	1−0	Südtirol (2)	Genoa
18:00 CEST	Vásquez 87'	Report		Stadium: Stadio Luigi Ferraris; Attendance: 6,509; Referee: Gianluca Manganiello

15 September 2026	Fiorentina (1)	3–0	Pisa (2)	Florence
21:00 CEST	Pellegrino 40'; Gnonto 71'; Gonçalves 90+2'	Report		Stadium: Stadio Artemio Franchi; Attendance: 17,474; Referee: Livio Marinelli

== Final stage ==
=== Bracket ===
Round of 16
Inter Milan
Genoa
Bologna
Palermo
AC Milan
Monza
Como
Cremonese
Roma
Hellas Verona
Juventus
Sassuolo
Atalanta
Udinese
Napoli
Fiorentina

Quarter-finals
Inter Milan or Genoa
Bologna or Palermo
AC Milan or Monza
Como or Cremonese
Roma or Hellas Verona
Juventus or Sassuolo
Atalanta or Udinese
Napoli or Fiorentina

Semi-finals
Winner of Match 37
Winner of Match 38
Winner of Match 39
Winner of Match 40

Final
Winner of Match 41
Winner of Match 42

=== Round of 16 ===
The round of 16 matches will be played between the eight winners from the second round and clubs seeded 1–8 in the 2025–26 Serie A.

1 December 2026	Inter Milan (1)	v	Genoa (1)	Milan
21:00 CET		Report		Stadium: San Siro

2 December 2026	Como (1)	v	Cremonese (2)	Como
21:00 CET		Report		Stadium: Stadio Giuseppe Sinigaglia

3 December 2026	Juventus (1)	v	Sassuolo (1)	Turin
21:00 CET		Report		Stadium: Juventus Stadium

15 December 2026	Bologna (1)	v	Palermo (2)	Bologna
21:00 CET		Report		Stadium: Stadio Renato Dall'Ara

16 December 2026	Napoli (1)	v	Fiorentina (1)	Naples
21:00 CET		Report		Stadium: Stadio Diego Armando Maradona

12 January 2027	Roma (1)	v	Hellas Verona (2)	Rome
21:00 CET		Report		Stadium: Stadio Olimpico

13 January 2027	AC Milan (1)	v	Monza (1)	Milan
21:00 CET		Report		Stadium: San Siro

26 January 2027	Atalanta (1)	v	Udinese (1)	Bergamo
21:00 CET		Report		Stadium: Stadio Atleti Azzurri d'Italia

=== Quarter-finals ===
The quarter-final matches will be played between clubs advancing from the round of 16.

3–10 February 2027	Inter Milan (1) or Genoa (1)	v	Bologna (1) or Palermo (2)	Milan or Genoa
21:00 CET		Report		Stadium: San Siro or Stadio Luigi Ferraris

3–10 February 2027	AC Milan (1) or Monza (1)	v	Como (1) or Cremonese (2)	Milan or Monza
21:00 CET		Report		Stadium: San Siro or Stadio Brianteo

3–10 February 2027	Roma (1) or Hellas Verona (2)	v	Juventus (1) or Sassuolo (1)	Rome or Verona
21:00 CET		Report		Stadium: Stadio Olimpico or Stadio Marcantonio Bentegodi

3–10 February 2027	Atalanta (1) or Udinese (1)	v	Napoli (1) or Fiorentina (1)	Bergamo or Udine
21:00 CET		Report		Stadium: Stadio Atleti Azzurri d'Italia or Stadio Friuli

=== Semi-finals ===
The two-legged semi-finals will be played between clubs advancing from the quarter-finals.

==== Matches ====
2–3 March 2027
21:00 CET

Winner of Match 37	v	Winner of Match 38
	Report

TBD
20–21 April 2027
21:00 CEST

Winner of Match 38	v	Winner of Match 37
	Report

TBD

2–3 March 2027
21:00 CET

Winner of Match 39	v	Winner of Match 40
	Report

TBD
20–21 April 2027
21:00 CEST

Winner of Match 40	v	Winner of Match 39
	Report

TBD

=== Final ===
19 May 2027	Winner of Match 41	v	Winner of Match 42	Rome
21:00 CEST		Report		Stadium: Stadio Olimpico

== Top goalscorers ==
As of 3 September 2026

Players and teams in bold are still active in the competition.

Rank	Player	Club	Goals
1	(Finland) **Joel Pohjanpalo**	**Palermo**	3
2	(Nigeria) Akor Adams	Venezia	2
2	(Italy) Giuseppe Ambrosino	Modena	2
2	(Ivory Coast) **Vakoun Bayo**	**Udinese**	2
2	(Georgia (country)) Giorgi Kvernadze	Frosinone	2
2	(Italy) Simone Lontani	Parma	2
2	(Italy) Francesco Ruocco	Mantova	2
2	(Italy) Francesco Salvemini	Benevento	2
2	(Portugal) **Gustavo Varela**	**Monza**	2
2	(Brazil) Vinicius	Ravenna	2
