= Janez Strajnar =

Slovenian footballer (born 1971)

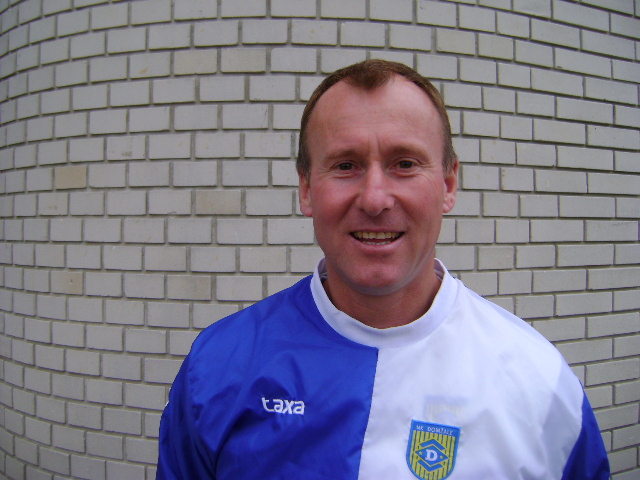
- Strajnar in 2015

Personal information
- Date of birth: 20 April 1971 (age 55)
- Place of birth: Ljubljana, Yugoslavia
- Height: 1.80 m (5 ft 11 in)
- Position: Goalkeeper

Youth career
- Črnuče

Senior career*
Years	Team	Apps	(Gls)
1991–1992	Domžale	40	(0)
1992–1993	Slovan	21	(0)
1993–1994	Gorica	19	(0)
1994–2005	Primorje	294	(0)
2005–2007	Domžale	31	(0)
2007–2010	Interblock	16	(0)
Total		421	(0)

International career
1997	Slovenia	1	(0)
- * Club domestic league appearances and goals

Janez Strajnar (born 20 April 1971) is a Slovenian former footballer who played as a goalkeeper.

== International career ==
Strajnar was capped once by Slovenia, in a March 1997 friendly match against Austria in which he only played the final few minutes.

== Personal life ==
Strajnar has two sons who play football professionally, Mark (b. 2003) and Aljaž (b. 2007).

== See also ==
- List of association football families of former Yugoslavia
