= Eddy Kouadio =

Italian footballer (born 2006)

Personal information
- Full name: Eddy Nda Konan Kouadio
- Date of birth: 7 May 2006 (age 20)
- Place of birth: Prato, Italy
- Height: 1.91 m (6 ft 3 in)
- Position: Centre-back

Team information
- Current team: Monza (on loan from Fiorentina)
- Number: 60

Youth career
- Galcianese
- ASD Tobbiana
- 2021–2025: Fiorentina

Senior career*
| Years | Team | Apps | (Gls) |
| 2025– | Fiorentina | 3 | (0) |
| 2026– | → Monza (loan) | 7 | (1) |

International career^{‡}
| 2024 | Italy U18 | 2 | (0) |
| 2024 | Italy U19 | 2 | (0) |
| 2026– | Italy U21 | 2 | (0) |
- * Club domestic league appearances and goals as of 21:40, 19 October 2026 (UTC) ‡ National team caps and goals as of 23:45, 16 November 2026 (UTC)

Eddy Nda Konan Kouadio (born 7 May 2006) is an Italian professional footballer who plays as a centre-back for Serie A club Monza, on loan from Fiorentina.

== Club career ==
=== Fiorentina ===
A youth product of Galcianese and ASD Tobbiana 1949, Kouadio joined the youth academy of Fiorentina in 2021, where he finished his development. In July 2024, he signed a contract with Fiorentina until 2027. On 31 August 2025, he made his senior and professional debut with Fiorentina during a 0–0 tie against Torino.

==== Loan to Monza ====
On 8 July 2026, Kouadio joined newly Serie A promoted club Monza, on loan for the 2026–27 season.

== International career ==
Kouadio was born in Italy to Ivorian parents. He holds dual Italian and Ivorian citizenship.

Kouadio is a youth international for Italy, having played for the Italy U18s and U19s in friendlies in 2024. Getting called-up with the U21s by head coach Silvio Baldini for the friendly matches against France U21 and Belgium U21 on 13 and 16 November 2026 respectively.

He was one of the players who were called up with the Italy national team by head coach Roberto Mancini for the 2026–27 UEFA Nations League matches against Belgium, Turkey and France between 25 September and 5 October 2026.

== Career statistics ==
=== Club ===
As of match played 19 October 2026

Appearances and goals by club, season and competition
| Club | Season | League | | | Cup | | Europe | | Other | | Total | |
| Club | Season | Division | Apps | Goals | Apps | Goals | Apps | Goals | Apps | Goals | Apps | Goals |
|---|---|---|---|---|---|---|---|---|---|---|---|---|
| Fiorentina | 2025–26 | Serie A | 3 | 0 | 0 | 0 | 5 (Note: Appearances in UEFA Conference League) | 0 | — | | 8 | 0 |
| Monza (loan) | 2026–27 | Serie A | 7 | 1 | 2 | 0 | — | | — | | 9 | 1 |
| Career total | | | 10 | 1 | 2 | 0 | 5 | 0 | 0 | 0 | 17 | 1 |
