= AC Monza Youth Sector =

- Full name: Associazione Calcio Monza S.p.A.
- Nicknames: I Biancorossi (The White and Reds); I Brianzoli (The Ones from Brianza); I Bagai (The Boys) (Note: In Brianzöö dialect)
- Ground: Centro Sportivo Silvio e Luigi Berlusconi – Monzello
- Owner: Beckett Layne Ventures
- President: Lauren Crampsie
- Head coach: Oscar Brevi
- League: Campionato Primavera 1
- 2025–26: Campionato Primavera 1, 14th of 20
- Website: acmonza.com
Home colours	Away colours

The AC Monza Youth Sector (Italian: Settore Giovanile) comprises the Primavera (under-20) team and the academy of Italian professional football club AC Monza. The under-20 squad competes in the Campionato Primavera 1.

After defeating Ascoli 7–5 after penalty shoot-outs in the 2022–23 Campionato Primavera 2 promotion play-offs final, Monza were promoted to the Primavera 1 in 2023.

== Players ==
=== Current squad ===
As of 8 July 2026

Note: Flags indicate national team as defined under FIFA eligibility rules; some limited exceptions apply. Players may hold more than one non-FIFA nationality.

No.	Pos.	Nation	Player
1	GK	ITA	Andrea Vailati
2	DF	ITA	Alessandro Bagnaschi
3	DF	LAT	Timurs Azarovs
4	DF	ITA	Manuel Villa
5	DF	ITA	Lorenzo Colonnese
6	MF	ITA	Andrea Romanini
7	MF	ITA	Endris Scaramelli
8	MF	ITA	Marco Buonaiuto
9	FW	ITA	Mamadou Gaye
10	FW	ITA	Francesco Reita
11	DF	ITA	Mattia Attinasi
12	GK	ITA	Jacopo Montagna
14	MF	SEN	Abdou Diene
16	FW	EGY	Amir Abou Elezz

No.	Pos.	Nation	Player
17	FW	ITA	Giulio Fardin
18	MF	AUS	Danilo Treffiletti
19	MF	ITA	Mathis Mout
21	FW	ITA	Rosindo Zanni
22	DF	ITA	Davide Castelli
24	MF	ITA	Nicolò Ballabio
33	DF	ITA	Simone Albè
39	DF	ITA	Andrea De Bonis
43	GK	SLO	Aljaž Strajnar
77	MF	ITA	Daniele Ganci
80	MF	ITA	Luca Rossini
90	FW	ITA	Christian Fogliaro
95	DF	ITA	Matteo Porta
