= Omari Forson =

English footballer (born 2004)

Personal information
- Full name: Omari Nathan Forson
- Date of birth: 20 July 2004 (age 22)
- Place of birth: Hammersmith, London, England
- Height: 1.79 m (5 ft 10 in)
- Positions: Winger; attacking midfielder

Team information
- Current team: Monza
- Number: 11

Youth career
- West Ham United
- –2019: Tottenham Hotspur
- 2019–2023: Manchester United

Senior career*
Years	Team	Apps	(Gls)
2023–2024	Manchester United	4	(0)
2024–	Monza	11	(0)

International career^{‡}
2019	England U15	4	(0)
2019	England U16	4	(0)
2022–2023	England U19	5	(2)
2023	England U20	2	(0)
- * Club domestic league appearances and goals as of 1 September 2026 ‡ National team caps and goals as of 17 October 2023

Omari Nathan Forson (born 20 July 2004) is an English professional footballer who plays as a winger or attacking midfielder for Serie A club Monza. He previously came through the youth academy at Manchester United.

== Early life ==
Forson was born in Hammersmith, London to Ghanaian parents. He attended Rise Park Academy in Romford.

== Club career ==
=== Manchester United ===
Having begun his career in the academies of West Ham United and Tottenham Hotspur, Forson joined Manchester United in January 2019. Following interest from Arsenal, Forson decided to remain with United, signing a scholarship deal in 2020. The same year, he was promoted to the under-18 side at the age of sixteen, and in August 2021, he signed his first professional deal with the club.

Ahead of the 2023–24 season, Forson was included in United's pre-season squad, travelling to Oslo, Norway, where he featured in a 2–0 friendly win against Leeds United. He made his first-team debut in a 2–0 away win against Wigan in the 2023–24 FA Cup. He made his Premier League debut as a substitute in a 4–3 away win against Wolves, in which he registered an assist for Kobbie Mainoo's late winner. With his contract due to expire at the end of the 2023–24 season, Forson was named in the club's Retained list for 2024–25 and offered a new deal.

=== Monza ===
On 11 June 2024, ahead of the expiration of his contract with Manchester United, Forson agreed to join Serie A side Monza on a free transfer, signing a four-year deal running until the end of June 2028.

== International career ==
Forson is eligible to represent England and Ghana at international level. He has played youth international football for England at under-15, under-16, under-19 and under-20 levels.

== Career statistics ==
As of match played 1 September 2026

Appearances and goals by club, season and competition
Club	Season	League			National cup (Note: Includes FA Cup, Coppa Italia)		League cup (Note: Includes EFL Cup)		Continental		Other		Total	
Club	Season	Division	Apps	Goals	Apps	Goals	Apps	Goals	Apps	Goals	Apps	Goals	Apps	Goals
Manchester United U21	2021–22	—	—		—		—		—		1 (Note: Appearance(s) in the EFL Trophy)	0	1	0
Manchester United U21	2022–23	—	—		—		—		—		3	1	3	1
Manchester United U21	2023–24	—	—		—		—		—		2	2	2	2
Manchester United U21	Total		—		—		—		—		6	3	6	3
Manchester United	2023–24	Premier League	4	0	3	0	0	0	0	0	—		7	0
Monza	2024–25	Serie A	9	0	2	0	—		—		—		11	0
Monza	2025–26	Serie B	0	0	0	0	—		—		0	0	0	0
Monza	2026–27	Serie A	2	0	2	1	—		—		—		4	1
Monza	Total		11	0	4	1	0	0	0	0	0	0	15	1
Career total			15	0	7	1	0	0	0	0	6	3	28	4

== Honours ==
Manchester United U18

- FA Youth Cup: 2021–22
