= Manga Foe Ondoa =

French footballer (born 2005)

Personal information
- Full name: Manga Michel Quentin Foe Ondoa
- Date of birth: 12 December 2005 (age 20)
- Place of birth: Paris, France
- Height: 1.83 m (6 ft 0 in)
- Position: Attacking midfielder

Team information
- Current team: Monza
- Number: 8

Youth career
- Entente Feignies Aulnoye
- 2022–2023: Valenciennes

Senior career*
Years	Team	Apps	(Gls)
2023	Valenciennes II	11	(2)
2023–2024	Valenciennes	15	(2)
2024–2025	Estoril	0	(0)
2025–2026	→ Oliveirense (loan)	30	(3)
2026–	Monza	8	(0)
- * Club domestic league appearances and goals as of 31 October 2026

Manga Michel Quentin Foe Ondoa (born 12 December 2005) is a French professional footballer who plays as an attacking midfielder for Serie A club Monza.

== Club career ==
A youth product of Entente Feignies Aulnoye, Foe Ondoa moved to Valenciennes' youth side in 2022. He was promoted to their senior side in 2023, but rejected an offer to remain with the club after their relegation in the 2023–24 season.

On 2 September 2024, he transferred to Portuguese club Estoril of the Primeira Liga. On 1 August 2025, he was loaned to Oliveirense for the 2025–26 season.

On 4 June 2026, he transferred to Italian club Monza of the Serie A.

== Personal life ==
Born in France, Foe Ondoa is of Cameroonian descent.
