= 2026–27 Serie A =

125th season of top-tier Italian football

Serie A
- Season: 2026–27
- Dates: 22 August 2026 – 30 May 2027
- Matches: 110
- Goals: 342 (3.11 per match)
- Top goalscorer: Donyell Malen (12 goals)
- Biggest home win: Roma 4–0 Fiorentina (24 August 2026); Frosinone 5–1 Lecce (29 October 2026)
- Biggest away win: Lecce 0–4 Roma (31 August 2026); Sassuolo 2–6 Lazio (27 October 2026); Parma 1–5 Roma (21 November 2026)
- Highest scoring: Inter Milan 5–3 Udinese (14 September 2026); Atalanta 4–4 Frosinone (25 October 2026); Sassuolo 2–6 Lazio (27 October 2026)
- Longest winning run: Lazio (6 matches)
- Longest unbeaten run: Lazio; Roma (11 matches)
- Longest winless run: Udinese (9 matches)
- Longest losing run: Udinese; Venezia (6 matches)
- Highest attendance: 77,691; AC Milan 3–1 Inter Milan (31 October 2026)
- Lowest attendance: 6,058; Lazio 1–0 Genoa (30 August 2026)
- All statistics correct as of 8 November 2026.

The 2026–27 Serie A (known as the Serie A Enilive for sponsorship reasons) is the 125th season of top-tier Italian football, the 95th in a round-robin tournament, and the 17th since its organization under an own league committee, the Lega Serie A. The season started on 22 August 2026 and is scheduled to conclude on 30 May 2027. Inter are the defending champions, having won their 21st title (scudetto) the previous season.

== Teams ==
Twenty teams are competing, including the top seventeen teams from the previous season and three promoted teams from Serie B. Venezia, Frosinone and Monza return to the top tier after one-, two- and one-year absences, respectively. They replace Cremonese, Hellas Verona and Pisa, who were relegated to Serie B after one, seven and one year in the top flight, respectively.

=== Team changes ===
Promoted from 2025–26 Serie B	Relegated from 2025–26 Serie A
Venezia	Cremonese
Frosinone	Hellas Verona
Monza	Pisa

=== Stadiums and locations ===
Locations of the 2026–27 Serie A teams
Location of teams in 2026–27 Serie A (Lombardy)

Team	Location	Stadium	Capacity
Atalanta	Bergamo	New Balance Arena	23,439
Bologna	Bologna	Stadio Renato Dall'Ara	38,279
Cagliari	Cagliari	Unipol Domus	16,416
Como	Como	Stadio Giuseppe Sinigaglia	13,602
Fiorentina	Florence	Stadio Artemio Franchi	43,118
Frosinone	Frosinone	Stadio Benito Stirpe	16,227
Genoa	Genoa	Stadio Luigi Ferraris	33,205
Inter Milan	Milan	Stadio Giuseppe Meazza	75,710
Juventus	Turin	Allianz Stadium	41,507
Lazio	Rome	Stadio Olimpico	70,634
Lecce	Lecce	Stadio Via del Mare-Ettore Giardiniero	30,354
AC Milan	Milan	San Siro	75,710
Monza	Monza	Stadio Brianteo	17,102
Napoli	Naples	Stadio Diego Armando Maradona	54,732
Parma	Parma	Stadio Ennio Tardini	22,352
Roma	Rome	Stadio Olimpico	70,634
Sassuolo	Reggio Emilia	Mapei Stadium – Città del Tricolore	21,515
Torino	Turin	Stadio Olimpico Grande Torino	28,177
Udinese	Udine	Bluenergy Stadium	25,132
Venezia	Venice	Stadio Pier Luigi Penzo	12,048

=== Number of teams by regions ===
No. of teams	Region	Team(s)
5	Lombardy	Atalanta, Como, Inter Milan, AC Milan and Monza
3	Emilia-Romagna	Bologna, Parma and Sassuolo
3	Lazio	Frosinone, Lazio and Roma
2	Piedmont	Juventus and Torino
1	Apulia	Lecce
1	Campania	Napoli
1	Friuli-Venezia Giulia	Udinese
1	Liguria	Genoa
1	Sardinia	Cagliari
1	Tuscany	Fiorentina
1	Veneto	Venezia

=== Personnel and kits ===
Team	Chairman	Manager	Captain	Kit maker	Shirt sponsor(s)	
Team	Chairman	Manager	Captain	Kit maker	Main	Other(s)
Atalanta	(Italy) Antonio Percassi	(Italy) Maurizio Sarri	(Brazil) Éderson	New Balance	Lete	List: Front: Snaifun; Back: Gewiss; Sleeves: None
Bologna	(Canada) Joey Saputo	(Italy) Raffaele Palladino	(Italy) Lorenzo De Silvestri	Macron	Saputo	List: Front: None; Back: Selenella; Sleeves: Lavoropiù
Cagliari	(Italy) Tommaso Giulini	(Italy) Fabio Pisacane	(Italy) Alessandro Deiola	EYE Sport	Sardegna Turismo	List: Front: Doppio Malto; Back: Banco di Sardegna; Sleeves: Bet365 Scores
Como	(Indonesia) Mirwan Suwarso	(Spain) Cesc Fàbregas	(France) Lucas Da Cunha	Adidas	Revolut	List: Front: None; Back: Uber; Sleeves: PokerStars News
Fiorentina	(United States) Giuseppe Commisso	(Italy) Paolo Vanoli	(Spain) David De Gea	Joma	Mediacom	List: Front: None; Back: None; Sleeves: Bet365 Scores
Frosinone	(Italy) Maurizio Stirpe	(Italy) Massimiliano Alvini	(Italy) Ilario Monterisi	Zeus	Banca Popolare del Frusinate	List: Front: 958 Santero; Back: Dem Supermercati; Sleeves: None
Genoa	(Romania) Dan Șucu	(Italy) Daniele De Rossi	(Mexico) Johan Vásquez	Kappa	Pulsee Luce e Gas (Home & Away) / Ceres (Third)	List: Front: Lino Sonego; Back: None; Sleeves: Bet365 Scores
Inter Milan	(Italy) Giuseppe Marotta	(Romania) Cristian Chivu	(Argentina) Lautaro Martínez	Nike	Betsson.sport	List: Front: None; Back: U-Power; Sleeves: BBVA
Juventus	(Italy) Gianluca Ferrero	(Italy) Luciano Spalletti	(Italy) Manuel Locatelli	Adidas	Jeep	List: Front: Visit Detroit; Back: Cygames; Sleeves: WhiteBIT
Lazio	(Italy) Claudio Lotito	(Italy) Gennaro Gattuso	(Italy) Mattia Zaccagni	Mizuno	None	List: Front: None; Back: None; Sleeves: kaiyunsports.news
Lecce	(Italy) Saverio Sticchi Damiani	(Italy) Eusebio Di Francesco	(Italy) Wladimiro Falcone	Adidas	DEGHI	List: Front: BetItalyPay; Back: DR Automobiles; Sleeves: Banca Popolare Pugliese
AC Milan	(Italy) Paolo Scaroni	(Portugal) Ruben Amorim	(France) Mike Maignan	Puma	Emirates	List: Front: None; Back: Bitpanda; Sleeves: MSC Cruises
Monza	(United States) Lauren Crampsie	(Croatia) Ivan Jurić	(Italy) Matteo Pessina	Nike	DAZN Bet Club	List: Front: None; Back: None; Sleeves: ZeroPlayer
Napoli	(Italy) Aurelio De Laurentiis	(Italy) Massimiliano Allegri	(Italy) Giovanni Di Lorenzo	EA7	MSC Cruises	List: Front: None; Back: Sorgesana; Sleeves: Dongfeng
Parma	(United States) Kyle Krause	(Italy) Alberto Gilardino	(Italy) Enrico Delprato	Puma	Prometeon	List: Front: AdmiralBet.news; Back: Moby; Sleeves: Crédit Agricole Italia
Roma	(United States) Dan Friedkin	(Italy) Gian Piero Gasperini	(Italy) Bryan Cristante	Adidas	Eurobet.live	List: Front: None; Back: Auberge Collection; Sleeves: Wizz Air
Sassuolo	(Italy) Carlo Rossi	(Italy) Roberto D'Aversa	(Italy) Domenico Berardi	Puma	Mapei	List: Front: None; Back: None; Sleeves: None
Torino	(Italy) Urbano Cairo	(Italy) Ignazio Abate	(Colombia) Duván Zapata	Joma	Suzuki	List: Front: Bet365 Scores; Back: EdiliziAcrobatica; Sleeves: Fratelli Beretta
Udinese	(Italy) Franco Soldati	(Italy) Paolo Zanetti	(Sweden) Jesper Karlström	Macron	Io sono Friuli-Venezia Giulia	List: Front: Banca 360 FVG; Back: Bluenergy; Sleeves: Bet365 Scores
Venezia	(United States) Francesca Bodie	(Italy) Davide Nicola	(United States) Gianluca Busio	Nocta	Cynar Spritz	List: Front: None; Back: Great Wall Motor; Sleeves: PokerStars News

Notes

- Puma is the official ball supplier for Serie A.
- Givova is the official sponsor of the Referee's Committee of the Italian Football Federation.
- Net Insurance, Acqua Lete and Dan John are the official sponsors of the Referee's Committee of the Italian Football Federation.
- Bancomat is the official sponsor for the fourth official boards to indicate additional time at the end of a match, as well as player substitutions.
- Haier is the Refcam sponsor.

=== Managerial changes ===
Team	Outgoing manager	Manner of departure	Date of vacancy	Position in the table	Incoming manager	Date of appointment
Napoli	(Italy) Antonio Conte	Mutual consent	24 May 2026	Pre-season	(Italy) Massimiliano Allegri	3 July 2026
AC Milan	(Italy) Massimiliano Allegri	Sacked	25 May 2026	Pre-season	(Portugal) Ruben Amorim	16 June 2026
Lazio	(Italy) Maurizio Sarri	Mutual consent	27 May 2026	Pre-season	(Italy) Gennaro Gattuso	23 June 2026
Bologna	(Italy) Vincenzo Italiano	Mutual consent	28 May 2026	Pre-season	(Germany) Domenico Tedesco	2 June 2026
Sassuolo	(Italy) Fabio Grosso	Mutual consent	4 June 2026	Pre-season	(Italy) Alberto Aquilani	12 June 2026
Fiorentina	(Italy) Paolo Vanoli	End of contract	5 June 2026	Pre-season	(Italy) Fabio Grosso	8 June 2026
Atalanta	(Italy) Raffaele Palladino	Sacked	9 June 2026	Pre-season	(Italy) Maurizio Sarri	15 June 2026
Torino	(Italy) Roberto D'Aversa	Mutual consent	12 June 2026	Pre-season	(Italy) Ignazio Abate	12 June 2026
Monza	(Italy) Paolo Bianco	Mutual consent	19 June 2026	Pre-season	(Croatia) Ivan Jurić	29 June 2026
Fiorentina	(Italy) Fabio Grosso	Sacked	6 September 2026	20th	(Italy) Paolo Vanoli	7 September 2026
Bologna	(Germany) Domenico Tedesco	Sacked	16 September 2026	16th	(Italy) Raffaele Palladino	16 September 2026
Parma	(Spain) Carlos Cuesta	Mutual consent	27 September 2026	15th	(Italy) Alberto Gilardino	29 September 2026
Venezia	(Italy) Giovanni Stroppa	Sacked	13 October 2026	20th	(Italy) Davide Nicola	14 October 2026
Udinese	(Germany) Kosta Runjaić	Sacked	2 November 2026	19th	(Italy) Paolo Zanetti	2 November 2026
Sassuolo	(Italy) Alberto Aquilani	Sacked	9 November 2026	17th	(Italy) Roberto D'Aversa	10 November 2026

== League table ==
Pos	Team	Pld	W	D	L	GF	GA	GD	Pts	Qualification or relegation
1	Lazio	12	10	2	0	28	9	+19	32	Qualification for the Champions League league phase
2	Roma	12	9	3	0	36	11	+25	30	Qualification for the Champions League league phase
3	Inter Milan	12	9	2	1	32	17	+15	29	Qualification for the Champions League league phase
4	AC Milan	12	8	3	1	28	14	+14	27	Qualification for the Champions League league phase
5	Como	12	8	2	2	20	10	+10	26	Qualification for the Europa League league phase (Note: The winners of the 2026–27 Coppa Italia and the fifth-placed team both qualify for the Europa League league phase. If the Coppa Italia winners finish in the top five, the sixth-placed team will qualify for the Europa League league phase. If Italy are one of the two associations with the highest UEFA coefficient points, fifth place will qualify for the Champions League league phase and the other qualifying spots will move down one position.)
6	Juventus	12	6	3	3	19	12	+7	21	Qualification for the Conference League play-off round
7	Frosinone	12	6	2	4	25	20	+5	20	
8	Napoli	12	5	3	4	19	14	+5	18	
9	Bologna	12	5	3	4	17	15	+2	18	
10	Genoa	12	5	1	6	13	16	−3	16	
11	Cagliari	12	5	1	6	10	17	−7	16	
12	Atalanta	12	4	3	5	21	24	−3	15	
13	Torino	12	4	2	6	15	18	−3	14	
14	Lecce	12	3	1	8	12	25	−13	10	
15	Fiorentina	11	2	3	6	17	25	−8	9	
16	Parma	12	2	2	8	10	22	−12	8	
17	Sassuolo	12	2	2	8	16	31	−15	8	
18	Monza	11	2	1	8	17	25	−8	7	Relegation to Serie B
19	Udinese	12	1	3	8	13	26	−13	6	Relegation to Serie B
20	Venezia	12	2	0	10	8	25	−17	6	Relegation to Serie B

Updated to match(es) played on 22 November 2026. Source: Serie A
Rules for classification: 1) Points; 2) Head-to-head points; 3) Head-to-head goal difference; 4) Goal difference; 5) Goals scored; 6) Drawing of lots.
End-of-season ties on points for 1st or 17th are instead decided by a one- or two-leg play-off, respectively, unless the play-off would involve a UEFA competition finalist (in which case rules 2–6 apply). Rules 2–6 determine home advantage (for 17th, the better-ranked team hosts the second leg); if three or more teams are tied, they also select the two play-off teams.

== Results ==
Home \ Away	ATA	BOL	CAG	COM	FIO	FRO	GEN	INT	JUV	LAZ	LEC	MIL	MON	NAP	PAR	ROM	SAS	TOR	UDI	VEN
Atalanta	—	1–0	1–2			4–4		4–4							0–3		2–1			3–1
Bologna		—			a			1–3		0–1			2–1		a		2–2	1–1	1–1	
Cagliari		0–2	—			1–0		0–1	1–1		1–0									
Como			2–0	—											2–1	0–0	2–0			1–0
Fiorentina	2–2			1–3	—	0–3			2–2					1–1				1–2		
Frosinone				2–0		—			0–1		5–1						4–2	2–0		3–2
Genoa				1–4	2–1	1–1	—		2–0			1–2		0–2						1–0
Inter Milan				2–0	2–1			—	a			a	4–1	3–2	3–0				5–3	
Juventus	2–0				a			a	—	0–3		1–1		2–0	2–0			a		4–0
Lazio			2–1				1–0			—	3–0	2–2	3–1		2–1	a				
Lecce		1–2					1–2		0–2		—		3–2			0–4				
AC Milan	3–2	2–4				5–1		3–1	a		3–0	—								2–0
Monza	0–1		4–0										—	1–4			2–1		2–3	
Napoli		1–0		1–2		3–0			a	1–1				—		3–3		1–0		
Parma		1–2	0–1				2–1						1–1		—	1–5		0–3	0–0	
Roma	2–1		4–2		4–0		2–0	2–2		a				a		—	3–0			
Sassuolo					2–4		0–2		3–2	2–6		1–1					—	2–1		
Torino				1–3					a		1–1	1–2	3–2			0–2		—	2–1	
Udinese			0–1	1–1						1–2	0–3	0–2				2–5			—	
Venezia					2–4			0–2		0–2	0–2			1–0					2–1	—

Updated to match(es) played on 22 November 2026. Source: Serie A
Legend: Blue = home team win; Yellow = draw; Red = away team win.
For upcoming matches, an "a" indicates there is an article about the rivalry between the two participants.

== Season statistics ==
As of matches played 22 November 2026

=== Top goalscorers ===
Rank	Player	Club	Goals
1	(Netherlands) Donyell Malen	Roma	12
2	(Portugal) Gustavo Varela	Monza	9
3	(Italy) Antonio Raimondo	Frosinone	8
4	(Montenegro) Nikola Krstović	Atalanta	7
5	(Italy) Alphadjo Cisse	AC Milan	6
5	(Italy) Pio Esposito	Inter Milan	6
5	(Netherlands) Tijjani Noslin	Lazio	6
5	(Montenegro) Milutin Osmajić	Genoa	6
5	(France) Marcus Thuram	Inter Milan	6
10	(Italy) Giacomo Calò	Frosinone	5
10	(Greece) Anastasios Douvikas	Como	5
10	(Italy) Davide Frattesi	Lazio	5
10	(Italy) Daniel Maldini	Cagliari	5
10	(Portugal) Rodrigo Mora	Roma	5
10	(United States) Christian Pulisic	AC Milan	5
10	(France) Adrien Rabiot	AC Milan	5

=== Hat-tricks ===
Player	Club	Against	Result	Date
(Netherlands) Donyell Malen	Roma	Fiorentina	4–0 (H)	24 August 2026
(Argentina) Franco Mastantuono	Fiorentina	Venezia	4–2 (A)	11 September 2026
(Italy) Antonio Raimondo	Frosinone	Sassuolo	4–2 (H)	16 October 2026
(Belgium) Samuel Mbangula	Bologna	AC Milan	4–2 (A)	28 October 2026
(Netherlands) Donyell Malen^{4}	Roma	Parma	5–1 (A)	21 November 2026
(Italy) Pio Esposito	Inter Milan	Atalanta	4–4 (A)	22 November 2026

Note: ^{4} – player scored 4 goals

=== Clean sheets ===
Rank	Player	Club	Clean sheets
1	(Italy) Guglielmo Vicario	Juventus	6
2	(Greece) Christos Mandas	Lazio	5
3	(France) Jean Butez	Como	4
3	(Italy) Elia Caprile	Cagliari	4
5	(Netherlands) Justin Bijlow	Genoa	3
5	(France) Mike Maignan	AC Milan	3
5	(Spain) Josep Martínez	Inter Milan	3
5	(Italy) Lorenzo Palmisani	Frosinone	3
5	(Serbia) Mile Svilar	Roma	3
10	(Italy) Marco Carnesecchi	Atalanta	2
10	(Italy) Giovanni Daffara	Parma	2
10	(Italy) Wladimiro Falcone	Lecce	2
10	(Italy) Pierluigi Gollini	Roma	2
10	(Italy) Alex Meret	Napoli	2
10	(Serbia) Vanja Milinković-Savić	Napoli	2

=== Discipline ===
==== Player ====
- Most yellow cards: 5
  - (Italy) Gabriele Bracaglia (Frosinone)
- Most red cards: 1
  - (North Macedonia) Eljif Elmas (Atalanta)
  - (Italy) Gianluca Gaetano (Atalanta)
  - (Angola) Kialonda Gaspar (Lecce)
  - (Italy) Lorenzo Lucchesi (Monza)
  - (Netherlands) Donyell Malen (Roma)
  - (Italy) Luca Marianucci (Napoli)
  - (Senegal) Abdoulaye Ndiaye (Parma)
  - (Slovakia) Adam Obert (Cagliari)
  - (Norway) Kristian Thorstvedt (Sassuolo)
  - (Mexico) Johan Vásquez (Genoa)

==== Club ====
- Most yellow cards: 24
  - Fiorentina
- Fewest yellow cards: 12
  - Como
  - Torino
- Most red cards: 2
  - Atalanta
- Fewest red cards: 0
  - Eleven teams

== Awards ==
=== Monthly awards ===
Month	Player of the Month		Rising Star of the Month		Coach of the Month		Goal of the Month		Ref.
Month	Player	Club	Player	Club	Coach	Club	Player	Club	Ref.
August–September	(Netherlands) Donyell Malen	Roma	(Italy) Antonio Raimondo	Frosinone	(Italy) Massimiliano Alvini	Frosinone	(Turkey) Hakan Çalhanoğlu	Inter Milan	
October	(Italy) Giacomo Calò	Frosinone	(Portugal) Gustavo Varela	Monza	(Italy) Gennaro Gattuso	Lazio	(Argentina) Santiago Castro	Roma	

== See also ==
- 2026–27 Serie B
- 2026–27 Serie C
- 2026–27 Coppa Italia
