= Gustavo Varela (footballer, born 2005) =

Portuguese footballer (born 2005)

- Varela with Monza in 2026

Personal information
- Full name: Gustavo Miguel Pereira Sousa Varela
- Date of birth: 30 January 2005 (age 21)
- Place of birth: Lisbon, Portugal
- Height: 1.84 m (6 ft 0 in)
- Position: Striker

Team information
- Current team: Monza
- Number: 9

Youth career
- 2012–2013: Miúdos Talentosos
- 2013–2016: Sporting CP
- 2016–2022: PAOK
- 2022–2023: Benfica

Senior career*
Years	Team	Apps	(Gls)
2023–2026	Benfica B	56	(14)
2024–2026	Benfica	1	(0)
2025–2026	→ Gil Vicente (loan)	32	(6)
2026–	Monza	9	(9)

International career^{‡}
2021–2022	Portugal U17	8	(1)
2023	Portugal U18	3	(2)
2024	Portugal U19	2	(1)
2024–2026	Portugal U20	9	(2)
2025–	Portugal U21	5	(3)
- * Club domestic league appearances and goals as of 16:02, 31 October 2026 (UTC) ‡ National team caps and goals as of 27 March 2026

Gustavo Miguel Pereira Sousa Varela (born 30 January 2005) is a Portuguese professional football player who plays as a striker for Serie A club Monza.

== Club career ==
Varela is a product of the Portuguese clubs Miúdos Talentosos and Sporting CP, before moving to the Greek club PAOK in 2016 to finish his development. On 5 January 2022 he transferred to Benfica. He was promoted to Benfica B in 2023. He debuted with the senior Benfica team in a 1–1 Primeira Liga tie with Rio Ave on 17 May 2024. On 30 May 2024, he extended his contract with Benfica until 2028. On 9 July 2025, he joined Gil Vicente on a season-long loan in the Primeira Liga.

On 27 July 2026, Varela joined newly-promoted Serie A club Monza on a four-year contract.

== International career ==
Born in Portugal, Varela is of Cape Verdean descent through his father. He is a youth international for Portugal, having played for the Portugal U21s in October 2025.

Varela was one of the players who were called-up with the Portugal national team by head coach Jorge Jesus for the 2026–27 UEFA Nations League matches against Denmark and Wales on 14 and 17 November 2026, respectively.

== Personal life ==
Varela's father, Fernando Varela, was also a professional footballer and played for the Cape Verde national team. He holds dual citizenship.

== Career statistics ==
=== Club ===
As of match played 31 October 2026

Appearances and goals by club, season and competition
Club	Season	League			National cup (Note: Includes Taça de Portugal, Coppa Italia)		League cup		Europe		Other		Total	
Club	Season	Division	Apps	Goals	Apps	Goals	Apps	Goals	Apps	Goals	Apps	Goals	Apps	Goals
Benfica B	2023–24	Liga 2	22	3	—		—		—		—		22	3
Benfica B	2024–25	Liga 2	34	11	—		—		—		—		34	11
Benfica B	Total		56	14	—		—		—		—		56	14
Benfica	2023–24	Primeira Liga	1	0	0	0	0	0	0	0	0	0	1	0
Gil Vicente (loan)	2025–26	Primeira Liga	32	6	1	1	—		—		—		33	7
Monza	2026–27	Serie A	9	9	1	2	—		—		—		10	11
Career total			98	29	2	3	0	0	0	0	0	0	100	32
