= 2025–26 Empoli FC season =

Empoli FC
- President: Fabrizio Corsi
- Manager: Guido Pagliuca (until 13 October); Alessio Dionisi (from 16 October until 10 March); Fabio Caserta (from 10 March)
- Stadium: Stadio Carlo Castellani
- Serie B: 15th
- Coppa Italia: Second round
- Top goalscorer: League: Stiven Shpendi (15); All: Stiven Shpendi (15)
- Biggest win: Empoli 5–0 Bari (29 November 2025)
- Biggest defeat: Pescara 4–0 Empoli (21 September 2025)

The 2025–26 season is the 106th in the history of Empoli Football Club and their first in Serie B since 2021, following relegation. The season will begin on August 15 with the Coppa Italia.

== Squad ==
=== Transfers In ===
Pos.	Player	Transferred from	Fee	Date	Source
FW	(Italy) Andrea Sodero	(Italy) Atalanta U23	Loan return	30 June 2025	
DF	(Slovenia) Petar Stojanović	(Italy) Salernitana	Loan return	30 June 2025	
FW	(Italy) Giuseppe Brugognone	(Italy) Foggia	Loan return	30 June 2025	
GK	(Slovenia) Lovro Stubljar	(Slovenia) NK Domžale	Loan return	30 June 2025	
MF	(Italy) Lorenzo Ignacchiti	(Italy) Reggiana	Loan return	30 June 2025	
DF	(Italy) Gabriele Guarino	(Italy) Carrarese	Loan return	30 June 2025	
MF	(Italy) Luca Belardinelli	(Italy) Südtirol	Loan return	30 June 2025	
MF	(Italy) Duccio Degli Innocenti	(Italy) Spezia	Loan return	30 June 2025	
GK	(Italy) Samuele Perisan	(Italy) Sampdoria	Loan return	30 June 2025	
MF	(Poland) Iwo Kaczmarski	(Poland) Miedź Legnica	Loan return	30 June 2025	
GK	(Italy) Niccolò Chiorra	(Italy) Carrarese	Loan return	30 June 2025	
FW	(Portugal) Herculano Nabian	(Spain) Mérida	Loan return	30 June 2025	
MF	(Italy) Francesco Vallarelli	(Italy) Giugliano	Loan return	30 June 2025	
DF	(Italy) Gabriele Indragoli	(Italy) Pianese	Loan return	30 June 2025	
FW	(Italy) Alessandro Torri	(Italy) Villa Valle	Loan return	30 June 2025	
DF	(Italy) Lapo Paolieri	(Italy) Seravezza Pozzi	Loan return	30 June 2025	
FW	(Italy) Giuseppe Brugognone	(Italy) Foggia	Loan return	30 June 2025	
DF	(Italy) Matteo Morelli	(Italy) Follonica Gavorrano	Loan return	30 June 2025	
FW	(Albania) Stiven Shpendi	(Italy) Cesena FC	€2,200,000	1 July 2025	
MF	(Italy) Edoardo Saporiti	(Italy) Lucchese	Free	1 July 2025	
MF	(Romania) Rareș Ilie	(France) OGC Nice	Loan	9 July 2025	
MF	(Italy) Francesco Fabri	(Italy) Olympia Thyrus	Undisclosed	11 July 2025	
FW	(Italy) Mateo Stickler	(Italy) Pistoiese	Free	13 July 2025	
MF	(The Gambia) Joseph Ceesay	(Sweden) Malmö	Undisclosed	16 July 2025	
DF	(Argentina) Franco Carboni	(Italy) Internazionale	Loan	17 July 2025	
DF	(Italy) Marco Curto	(Italy) Como	€780,000	25 July 2025	
DF	(Italy) Brando Moruzzi	(Italy) Juventus Next Gen	Loan	26 July 2025	
GK	(Italy) Andrea Fulignati	(Italy) US Cremonese	Loan	29 July 2025	
MF	(Spain) Gerard Yepes	(Italy) UC Sampdoria	Free	8 August 2025	
MF	(Italy) Salvatore Elia	(Italy) Spezia	€1,700,000	8 August 2025	
FW	(Italy) Alessio Spatari	(Italy) Oltrepò	Free	9 August 2025	
DF	(Italy) Nosa Edward Obaretin	(Italy) Napoli	Loan	18 August 2025	
FW	(Italy) Marco Nasti	(Italy) Cremonese	Loan	18 August 2025	
DF	(Italy) Matteo Lovato	(Italy) Salernitana	Loan + fee	18 August 2025	
FW	(Italy) Mateo Stickler	(Italy) Pistoiese	Loan return	19 August 2025	
GK	(Italy) Manuel Gasparini	(Italy) Clodiense	Free	25 August 2025	
MF	(Italy) Andrea Ghion	(Italy) Sassuolo	Loan + fee	1 September 2025	
FW	(Italy) Flavio Bianchi	Unattached		18 September 2025	
DF	(Belgium) Jeremy Moray	(Italy) Rimini	Loan return	28 November 2025	
MF	(Denmark) Ank Bølling Asmussen	(Italy) Rimini	Loan return	28 November 2025	
FW	(Italy) Giuseppe Brugognone	(Italy) Pistoiese	Loan return	2 January 2026	
DF	(Italy) Simone Romagnoli	(Italy) Sampdoria	Free	28 January 2026	
FW	(Czech Republic) Daniel Fila	(Italy) Venezia	Loan	30 January 2026	
DF	(Italy) Antonio Candela	(Italy) Spezia	Loan	30 January 2026	
MF	(Italy) Luca Magnino	(Italy) Modena	€150,000	2 February 2026	

=== Transfers Out ===
Pos.	Player	Transferred to	Fee	Date	Source
FW	(Italy) Sebastiano Esposito	(Italy) Inter Milan	Loan return	10 June 2025	
DF	(France) Junior Sambia	(Italy) Salernitana	Loan return	30 June 2025	
DF	(Italy) Mattia Viti	(France) Nice	Loan return	30 June 2025	
FW	(Italy) Lorenzo Colombo	(Italy) AC Milan	Loan return	30 June 2025	
FW	(Ivory Coast) Christian Kouamé	(Italy) Fiorentina	Loan return	30 June 2025	
MF	(Morocco) Youssef Maleh	(Italy) Lecce	Loan return	30 June 2025	
FW	(Norway) Ola Solbakken	(Italy) Roma	Loan return	30 June 2025	
GK	(Colombia) Devis Vásquez	(Italy) AC Milan	Loan return	30 June 2025	
DF	(Georgia (country)) Saba Sazonov	(Italy) Torino	Loan return	30 June 2025	
MF	(Poland) Szymon Żurkowski	(Italy) Spezia	Loan return	30 June 2025	
FW	(Albania) Stiven Shpendi	(Italy) Cesena	Loan return	30 June 2025	
DF	(Italy) Mattia De Sciglio	(Italy) Juventus	Loan return	30 June 2025	
MF	(Italy) Jacopo Bacci	(Italy) Padova	Loan return	30 June 2025	
DF	(Slovenia) Petar Stojanović	(Poland) Legia Warsaw	Free	1 July 2025	
MF	(Scotland) Liam Henderson	(Italy) UC Sampdoria	End of contract	1 July 2025	
DF	(Italy) Luca Marianucci	(Italy) Napoli	€9,900,000	1 July 2025	
MF	(Italy) Jacopo Fazzini	(Italy) Fiorentina	€9,300,000	1 July 2025	
MF	(Italy) Francesco Vallarelli	(Italy) Reggiana	Undisclosed	1 July 2025	
MF	(Ukraine) Viktor Kovalenko	Released		1 July 2025	
MF	(England) Tino Anjorin	(Italy) Torino	Loan	4 July 2025	
FW	(Italy) Alessandro Torri	(Italy) Ospitaletto	Loan	8 July 2025	
DF	(Albania) Ardian Ismajli	(Italy) Torino	Free	8 July 2025	
GK	(Italy) Niccolò Chiorra	(Italy) Casarano	Undisclosed	10 July 2025	
MF	(Italy) Francesco Fabri	(Italy) Seravezza Pozzi	Loan	11 July 2025	
DF	(Italy) Matteo Morelli	(Italy) San Donato	Free	16 July 2025	
MF	(Ghana) Emmanuel Gyasi	(Italy) Palermo	Loan	16 July 2025	
DF	(New Zealand) Liberato Cacace	(Wales) Wrexham	€2,500,000	18 July 2025	
DF	(Italy) Lapo Paolieri	(Italy) Pontedera	Free	18 July 2025	
MF	(Italy) Alberto Grassi	(Italy) Cremonese	€1,000,000	19 July 2025	
DF	(Italy) Giuseppe Pezzella	(Italy) US Cremonese	€2,000,000	25 July 2025	
GK	(Italy) Jacopo Seghetti	(Italy) Livorno	Loan	31 July 2025	
FW	(Italy) Alessio Spatari	(Italy) Seravezza Pozzi	Loan	1 August 2025	
DF	(Georgia (country)) Saba Goglichidze	(Italy) Udinese	€4,000,000	5 August 2025	
FW	(Portugal) Herculano Nabian	(Italy) Pontedera	Loan	7 August 2025	
GK	(Italy) Valerio Biagini	(Italy) Pontedera	Free	8 August 2025	
GK	(Italy) Marco Silvestri	(Italy) Cremonese	Free	13 August 2025	
GK	(Slovenia) Lovro Stubljar	(Netherlands) FC Groningen	Undisclosed	15 August 2025	
GK	(Italy) Federico Brancolini	(Italy) Salernitana	Loan	19 August 2025	
FW	(Italy) Giuseppe Brugognone	(Italy) Pistoiese	Loan	20 August 2025	
FW	(Peru) Mateo Stickler	San Marino	Loan	20 August 2025	
MF	(Poland) Iwo Kaczmarski	(Italy) Inter U23	Loan	30 August 2025	
FW	(Italy) Andrea Sodero	(Italy) Pianese	Loan	1 September 2025	
MF	(Denmark) Ank Asmussen	(Italy) Rimini	Loan	1 September 2025	
DF	(Belgium) Jeremy Moray	(Italy) Rimini	Loan	1 September 2025	
FW	(Italy) Giuseppe Brugognone	(Italy) Sangiuliano City	Loan	8 January 2026	
MF	(Italy) Luca Belardinelli	(Italy) Reggiana	Loan	9 January 2026	
DF	(Argentina) Franco Carboni	(Italy) Inter Milan	Loan return	28 January 2026	
FW	(Italy) Ismaël Konaté	(Italy) Lecco	Loan	30 January 2026	
DF	(Italy) Lorenzo Tosto	(Italy) Livorno	Loan	2 February 2026	
MF	(Denmark) Ank Asmussen	(Italy) Ghiviborgo	Loan	2 February 2026	

== Friendlies ==
21 July 2025	Empoli	7–0	Mobilieri Ponsacco

26 July 2025	Empoli	1–2	Virtus Entella

30 July 2025	Empoli	2–3	Pisa

5 August 2025	Empoli	0–0	Sassuolo

== Competitions ==
=== Overall record ===
Competition	First match	Last match	Starting round	Record							
Competition	First match	Last match	Starting round	Pld	W	D	L	GF	GA	GD	Win %
Serie B	23 August 2025	8–10 May 2026	Matchday 1	7	2	3	2	10	13	−3	28.57
Coppa Italia	15 August 2025		Round of 32	1	0	1	0	1	1	+0	0.00
Total				8	2	4	2	11	14	−3	25.00

Last updated: 5 October 2025
Source: Competitions

=== Serie B ===
==== League table ====
Pos	Team	Pld	W	D	L	GF	GA	GD	Pts	Promotion, qualification or relegation
13	Sampdoria	38	11	11	16	35	48	−13	44 (Note: Carrarese finished ahead of Sampdoria on head-to-head goal difference: Sampdoria 3–2 Carrarese, Carrarese 2–0 Sampdoria.)	
14	Virtus Entella	38	10	12	16	36	51	−15	42	
15	Empoli	38	9	14	15	47	54	−7	41	
16	Südtirol (O)	38	8	17	13	38	48	−10	41	Qualification for relegation play-out
17	Bari (R)	38	10	10	18	38	60	−22	40	Qualification for relegation play-out

Source: Serie BKT
Rules for classification: 1) Points; 2) Head-to-head points; 3) Head-to-head goal difference; 4) Goal difference; 5) Goals scored; 6) Draw.
(Note: Head-to-head record is used only after all the matches between the teams in question have been played)
(O) Play-off winners; (R) Relegated

==== Results summary ====
Overall								Home						Away					
Pld	W	D	L	GF	GA	GD	Pts	W	D	L	GF	GA	GD	W	D	L	GF	GA	GD
38	9	14	15	47	55	−8	41	5	11	3	28	21	+7	4	3	12	19	34	−15

==== Results by round ====
Round	1	2	3	4	5	6	7
Ground	H	A	H	A	H	H	A
Result	W	L	D	L	D	D	W
Position	1	10	9				

Updated to match(es) played on 5v October 2025. Source:
A = Away; H = Home; W = Win; D = Draw; L = Loss

==== Matches ====
The Serie B fixtures were released on 30 July 2025.

23 August 2025 1	Empoli	3–1	Padova	Empoli
19:00	Shpendi 20'; Popov 41', 66'; Yepes (yellow card) 45+3'; Belardinelli (yellow card) 90+3'		Bortolussi 25'; Capelli (yellow card) 49'; Baselli (yellow card) 55'; Barreca (yellow card) 57'; Ghiglione (yellow card) 74'	Stadium: Stadio Carlo Castellani; Attendance: 6,137; Referee: Maria Sole Ferrieri Caputi

29 August 2025 2	Reggiana	3–1	Empoli	Reggio Emilia
20:30 UTC+2	Gondo 44' (pen.); Reinhart 57'; Portanova 78'		Popov 12'; Guarino (red card) 42'; Obaretin (red card) 45+1'; Ignacchiti (yellow card) 73'	Stadium: Mapei Stadium – Città del Tricolore; Attendance: 8,592; Referee: Juan Luca Sacchi

14 September 2025 3	Empoli	1–1	Spezia	Empoli
19:30 UTC+2	Yepes (yellow card) 17'; Popov 49'; Elia (yellow card) 62'; Ilie (yellow card) 89'		Esposito 18' (pen.); Cassata (yellow card) 43'; Nagy (yellow card) 89'	Stadium: Stadio Carlo Castellani; Attendance: 6,960; Referee: Ermanno Feliciani

21 September 2025 4	Pescara	4–0	Empoli	Pescara
17:15 UTC+2	Capellini (yellow card) 60'; Oliveri 68', 71'; Meazzi 80'; Merola 90+2'		Curto (yellow card) 23'; Guarino (yellow card) 65'	Stadium: Stadio Adriatico – Giovanni Cornacchia; Attendance: 8,985; Referee: Marco Di Bello

28 September 2025 5	Empoli	2–2	Carrarese	Empoli
20:30 UTC+2	Ghion (yellow card) 33'; Carboni (yellow card) 40'; Shpendi 43'; Ceesay 78'		Zuelli (yellow card) 5'; Zanon 15'; Bozhanaj (yellow card) 48'; Sekulov (yellow card) 56'; Finotto 88'	Stadium: Stadio Carlo Castellani; Attendance: 7,069; Referee: Davide Di Marco

1 October 2025 6	Empoli	1–1	Monza	Empoli
20:30 UTC+2	Belardinelli (yellow card) 57'; Elia (yellow card) 62'; Guarino 79'		Colombo (yellow card) 14'; Carboni 49'; Obiang (yellow card) 66'	Stadium: Stadio Carlo Castellani; Attendance: 6,014; Referee: Giuseppe Mucera

5 October 2025 7	Südtirol	1–2	Empoli	Bolzano
16:00 UTC+2	Kofler (red card) 5'; Pecorino 42'; Adamonis (yellow card) 67'; Tronchin (yellow card) 90+9'		Shpendi 60'; Ceesay (yellow card) 80'; Guarino (yellow card) 87'; Nasti 90+6'	Stadium: Stadio Druso; Attendance: 3,439; Referee: Valerio Crezzini

19 October 2025 8	Empoli	1–1	Venezia	Empoli
18:15 UTC+2	Shpendi 42'; Ilie (yellow card) 53'; Pellegri (yellow card) 60'; Obaretin (yellow card) 85'		Adorante 34'; Franjić (yellow card) 90+4'	Stadium: Carlo Castellani; Attendance: 6,640; Referee: Ivano Pezzuto

24 October 2025 9	Modena	2–1	Empoli	Modena
20:30 UTC+2	Gliozzi 45+6' (pen.); Zampano (yellow card) 50'; Tonoli 66', (yellow card) 90+4'; Sersanti (yellow card) 79'		Ceesay 22'; Elia (yellow card) 30'; Ilie (yellow card) 30'; Shpendi (yellow card) 37'	Stadium: Stadio Alberto Braglia; Attendance: 11,879; Referee: Paride Tremolada

28 October 2025 10	Empoli	1–1	Sampdoria	Empoli
20:30 UTC+2	Elia (yellow card) 58' (red card) 65'; Popov 77'; Curto (yellow card) 90+8'		Benedetti (yellow card) 62'; Çuni 80'; Ferri (red card) 90+9'	Stadium: Stadio Carlo Castellani; Attendance: 5,947; Referee: Marco Piccinini

1 November 2025 11	Virtus Entella	1–0	Empoli	Chiavari
17:15 UTC+2	Tiritiello (yellow card) 59', (goal) 86'; Di Mario (yellow card) 90+3'		Belardinelli (yellow card) 66'; Innocenti (yellow card) 85'	Stadium: Stadio Comunale; Attendance: 2,528; Referee: Maurizio Mariani

8 November 2025 12	Empoli	1–0	Catanzaro	Empoli
16:00 UTC+2	Obaretin (yellow card) 27'; Popov (yellow card) 31' (red card) 44'; Shpendi 59' (pen.); Yepes (yellow card) 70'; Fulignati (yellow card) 72'		Bettella (yellow card) 55'; Brighenti (yellow card) 66'; Pigliacelli (yellow card) 66'; Alesi (yellow card) 90'	Stadium: Stadio Carlo Castellani; Attendance: 6,816; Referee: Simone Galipò

22 November 2025 13	Avellino	0–3	Empoli	Avellino
16:00 UTC+2	Cancellotti (yellow card) 30'; Fontanarosa (yellow card) 41'		Elia 17'; Innocenti (yellow card) 22'; Yepes (yellow card) 35'; Saporiti 45+2', (yellow card) 90+3'; Pellegri 90+5'	Stadium: Stadio Partenio-Adriano Lombardi; Attendance: 8,967; Referee: Francesco Fourneau

29 November 2025 14	Empoli	5–0	Bari	Empoli
16:00 UTC+2	Guarino 45+2'; Shpendi 52'; Ceesay (yellow card) 64', (goal) 90+1'; Yepes 66'; Pellegri 89'		Dickmann (yellow card) 24'; Vicari (yellow card) 39'	Stadium: Stadio Carlo Castellani; Attendance: 7,299; Referee: Fabio Maresca

7 December 2025 15	Empoli	1–3	Palermo	Empoli
18:15 UTC+2	Pellegri (yellow card) 61', (goal) 63'; Moruzzi (yellow card) 90'		Le Douaron 7'; Segre (yellow card) 14'; Pohjanpalo 18', 74'; Bereszyński (yellow card) 33'	Stadium: Stadio Carlo Castellani; Attendance: 7,857; Referee: Federico Dionisi

13 December 2025 16	Juve Stabia	2–0	Empoli	Castellammare di Stabia
16:00 UTC+2	Giorgini 12', (yellow card) 90'; Correia (yellow card) 40'; Carissoni 63'; Cacciamani (yellow card) 74'; Leone (yellow card) 77'		Fulignati (yellow card) 40'; Shpendi (yellow card) 72'	Stadium: Stadio Romeo Menti; Attendance: 3,632; Referee: Alberto Arena

21 December 2025 17	Mantova	0–1	Empoli	Mantua
18:15 UTC+2	Wieser (yellow card) 31'; Falletti (yellow card) 41'; Ruocco (yellow card) 63'; Trimboli (yellow card) 88'		Guarino (yellow card) 39'; Elia (yellow card) 63'; Nasti 67', (yellow card) 68'	Stadium: Stadio Danilo Martelli; Attendance: 6,965; Referee: Maria Sole Ferrieri Caputi

27 December 2025 18	Empoli	1–1	Frosinone	Empoli
16:00 UTC+2	Yepes (yellow card) 14'; Nasti 24'		Raimondo 16'; Kvernadze (yellow card) 52'; Cittadini (yellow card) 55'; Calò (yellow card) 76'	Stadium: Stadio Carlo Castellani; Attendance: 7,057; Referee: Ivano Pezzuto

10 January 2026 19	Cesena	0–1	Empoli	Cesena
20:30 UTC+2	Frabotta (yellow card) 16'; Francesconi (yellow card) 29'; Guidi (yellow card) 85'		Guarino (yellow card) 31'; Ilie 47'; Moruzzi (yellow card) 51'	Stadium: Stadio Dino Manuzzi; Referee: Paride Tremolada

17 January 2026 20	Empoli	0–1	Südtirol	Empoli
16:00 UTC+2			Zedadka (yellow card) 19'; Pecorino 24'; Merkaj (yellow card) 45'; Tait (yellow card) 46'; Verdi (yellow card) 81'; Tronchin (yellow card) 86'	Stadium: Stadio Carlo Castellani; Referee: Kevin Bonacina

23 January 2026 21	Carrarese	3–0	Empoli	Carrara
21:30 UTC+2	Illanes 28'; Zanon 62'; Oliana (yellow card) 67'; Abiuso 76'		Nasti (yellow card) 36'	Stadium: Stadio dei Marmi; Referee: Mario Perri

31 January 2026 22	Empoli	0–0	Modena	Empoli
16:00 UTC+2	Shpendi (yellow card) 56'		De Luca (yellow card) 38'; Nador (yellow card) 45' (yellow-red card) 81'	Stadium: Stadio Carlo Castellani; Referee: Giuseppe Mucera

7 February 2026 23	Palermo	3–2	Empoli	Palermo
18:15 UTC+2	Fulignati 24' (o.g.); Bani (yellow card) 33'; Ceccaroni (yellow card) 45'; Pohjanpalo 57', 84' (pen.)		Guarino 5'; Lovato (yellow card) 38'; Obaretin (yellow card) 66'; Ebuehi 72'; Fulignati (yellow card) 90+6'; Magnino (yellow card) 90+7'	Stadium: Stadio Renzo Barbera; Referee: Paride Tremolada

11 February 2026 24	Empoli	1–2	Juve Stabia	Empoli
21:00 UTC+2	Lovato 11', (yellow card) 80'		Leone 57'; Carissoni 64'	Stadium: Stadio Carlo Castellani; Referee: Valerio Crezzini

15 February 2026 25	Empoli	1–1	Reggiana	Empoli
18:15 UTC+2	Popov (yellow card) 47'; Degli Innocenti (yellow card) 65'; Shpendi 72'; Guarino (yellow card) 90'; Curto (yellow card) 90+4'		Girma 26' (pen.); Reinhart (yellow card) 31'; Fumagalli (yellow card) 90+7'	Stadium: Stadio Carlo Castellani; Referee: Daniele Perenzoni

20 February 2026 26	Frosinone	2–2	Empoli	Frosinone
21:30 UTC+2	Ghedjemis 45+1'; Koutsoupias 60'; Gelli (yellow card) 79'		Shpendi 16', 54'; Magnino (yellow card) 22'; Elia (yellow card) 26'; Curto (yellow card) 45+1'; Obaretin (yellow card) 73'	Stadium: Stadio Benito Stirpe; Referee: Giuseppe Mucera

28 February 2026 27	Empoli	1–1	Cesena	Empoli
16:00 UTC+2	Fila 71'		Shpendi 29'; Cerri (yellow card) 41'	Stadium: Stadio Carlo Castellani; Referee: Ivano Pezzuto

4 March 2026 28	Bari	2–1	Empoli	Bari
21:00 UTC+2	Rao 42'; Esteves (yellow card) 59'; Maggiore 72'; Cistana (yellow card) 90+1'		Yepes (yellow card) 3'; Lovato (red card) 23'; Shpendi 45+1'	Stadium: Stadio San Nicola; Referee: Maria Sole Ferrieri Caputi

8 March 2026 29	Catanzaro	3–2	Empoli	Catanzaro
16:00 UTC+2	Pittarello 56', 63'; Cassandro 73'; Antonini (yellow card) 86'		Elia 1'; Nasti 15'; Yepes (yellow card) 17'; Magnino (yellow card) 24'; Guarino (yellow card) 45+3'	Stadium: Stadio Nicola Ceravolo; Referee: Valerio Crezzini

14 March 2026 30	Empoli	2–2	Mantova	Empoli
16:00 UTC+2	Magnino (yellow card) 44'; Ilie (yellow card) 45+1'; Shpendi 50'; Saporiti 84'; Nasti (yellow card) 90+6'		Bragantini 21', (yellow card) 49'; Cella 37'; Bardi (yellow card) 84'	Stadium: Stadio Carlo Castellani; Referee: Matteo Marcenaro

17 March 2026 31	Spezia	1–1	Empoli	La Spezia
21:00 UTC+2	Bandinelli (yellow card) 38'; Artistico 69'		Nasti (yellow card) 40'; Lovato (yellow card) 51'; Candela (yellow card) 65'; Haas (yellow card) 75'; Degli Innocenti (yellow card) 79'; Saporiti 90+6' (pen.)	Stadium: Stadio Alberto Picco; Referee: Luca Massimi

22 March 2026 32	Empoli	4–2	Pescara	Empoli
16:00 UTC+2	Yepes (yellow card) 2'; Shpendi 9', 65'; Degli Innocenti (yellow card) 26'; Lovato 33'; Fila 80'		Acampora (red card) 13'; Di Nardo (yellow card) 32', (goal) 41', 47'; Cagnano (yellow card) 49'	Stadium: Stadio Carlo Castellani; Referee: Antonio Rapuano

6 April 2026 33	Sampdoria	1–0	Empoli	Genoa
18:15 UTC+2	Pierini 58'; Begić (yellow card) 76'; Soleri (yellow card) 90'		Moruzzi (yellow card) 80'; Haas (yellow card) 87'	Stadium: Stadio Luigi Ferraris; Referee: Ivano Pezzuto

12 April 2026 34	Padova	1–0	Empoli	Padua
16:00 UTC+2	Faedo (yellow card) 63'; Bortolussi 84', (yellow card) 85'		Guarino (yellow card) 36'	Stadium: Stadio Euganeo; Referee: Daniele Perenzoni

19 April 2026 35	Empoli	1–1	Virtus Entella	Empoli
20:30 UTC+2	Guarino (yellow card) 20'; Magnino 50'		Guiu 13'; Mezzoni (yellow card) 55'; Di Mario (yellow card) 64'; Marconi (yellow card) 90'	Stadium: Stadio Carlo Castellani; Referee: Livio Marinelli

25 April 2026 36	Venezia	2–0	Empoli	Venice
18:15 UTC+2	Adorante 50'; Doumbia 87'		Lovato (yellow card) 56'; Elia (yellow card) 90+4'	Stadium: Stadio Pierluigi Penzo; Referee: Mario Perri

1 May 2026 37	Empoli	1–0	Avellino	Empoli
16:00 UTC+2	Haas (yellow card) 46'; Lovato 58'; Shpendi (penalty missed) 72'; Elia (yellow card) 77'; Yepes (yellow card) 83'		Sounas (yellow card) 57'; Fontanarosa (red card) 90+7'	Stadium: Stadio Carlo Castellani; Referee: Federico La Penna

8 May 2026 38	Monza	2–2	Empoli	Monza
21:30 UTC+2	Pessina (yellow card) 4'; Petagna 29'; Delli Carri 65'; Birindelli (yellow card) 67'		Shpendi 1', 90+1'; Guarino (yellow card) 18'; Romagnoli (yellow card) 74'; Lovato (yellow card) 76'	Stadium: Stadio Brianteo; Referee: Matteo Marcenaro

=== Coppa Italia ===
The Round of 64 matchup was announced on 5 June 2025.

15 August 2025 Round of 32	Empoli	1–1 (3–0 p)	Reggiana	Empoli
17:00 UTC+2	Curto (yellow card) 6'; Carboni (yellow card) 38'; Popov (yellow card) 44'; Ilie 64'		Gondo 13'; Reinhart (yellow card) 44'	Stadium: Stadio Carlo Castellani; Attendance: 1,894; Referee: Andrea Calzavara
	Penalties
	Belardinelli (penalty scored); Elia (penalty scored); Carboni (penalty missed); Busiello (penalty scored)		(penalty missed) Gondo; (penalty missed) Marras; (penalty missed) Rover

25 September 2025 Second round	Genoa	3–1	Empoli	Genoa
17:30 UTC+2	Frendrup 15'; Marcandalli 56'; Ekhator 83'		Saporiti 12'	Stadium: Stadio Luigi Ferraris; Attendance: 8,626; Referee: Federico Dionisi

== Appearances and goals ==
As of match played 21 December 2025

Players with no appearances are not included on the list
Italics indicate a loaned in player

No.	Pos	Nat	Player	Total		Serie B		Coppa Italia	
No.	Pos	Nat	Player	Apps	Goals	Apps	Goals	Apps	Goals
1	GK	(Italy) ITA	Samuele Perisan	1	0	0+0	0	1+0	0
2	DF	(Italy) ITA	Marco Curto	16	0	12+3	0	1+0	0
4	DF	(Italy) ITA	Simone Romagnoli	3	0	3+0	0	0+0	0
5	DF	(Italy) ITA	Nosa Obaretin	30	0	28+1	0	1+0	0
6	MF	(Italy) ITA	Duccio Degli Innocenti	24	0	13+11	0	0+0	0
7	MF	(Italy) ITA	Salvatore Elia	34	2	30+3	2	0+1	0
8	MF	(Italy) ITA	Luca Magnino	15	1	15+0	1	0+0	0
9	FW	(Italy) ITA	Pietro Pellegri	12	3	3+9	3	0+0	0
10	MF	(Romania) ROU	Rareș Ilie	28	2	14+12	1	2+0	1
11	FW	(Albania) ALB	Stiven Shpendi	37	15	32+3	15	1+1	0
14	MF	(Spain) ESP	Gerard Yepes	34	1	27+5	1	1+1	0
15	MF	(The Gambia) GAM	Joseph Ceesay	31	3	16+14	3	0+1	0
17	FW	(Czech Republic) CZE	Daniel Fila	12	2	4+8	2	0+0	0
18	MF	(Italy) ITA	Andrea Ghion	26	0	20+6	0	0+0	0
19	FW	(Italy) ITA	Marco Nasti	26	4	17+9	4	0+0	0
20	DF	(Italy) ITA	Matteo Lovato	33	3	32+1	3	0+0	0
21	GK	(Italy) ITA	Andrea Fulignati	39	0	38+0	0	1+0	0
24	DF	(Nigeria) NGA	Tyronne Ebuehi	19	1	6+11	1	2+0	0
25	MF	(Italy) ITA	Lorenzo Ignacchiti	23	0	11+10	0	1+1	0
26	DF	(Italy) ITA	Antonio Candela	16	0	11+5	0	0+0	0
27	DF	(Italy) ITA	Brando Moruzzi	30	0	19+9	0	2+0	0
28	DF	(Italy) ITA	Gabriele Indragoli	2	0	1+0	0	0+1	0
32	MF	(Switzerland) SUI	Nicolas Haas	18	0	4+14	0	0+0	0
34	DF	(Italy) ITA	Gabriele Guarino	37	3	31+4	3	2+0	0
48	FW	(Italy) ITA	Edoardo Zanaga	1	0	0+0	0	0+1	0
53	MF	(Italy) ITA	Danilo Busiello	1	0	0+0	0	0+1	0
70	FW	(Italy) ITA	Edoardo Saporiti	20	4	11+8	3	1+0	1
77	FW	(Ukraine) UKR	Bohdan Popov	24	5	6+16	5	2+0	0
89	FW	(Italy) ITA	Thomas Campaniello	1	0	0+0	0	0+1	0
99	FW	(Italy) ITA	Flavio Bianchi	8	0	0+8	0	0+0	0
Player(s) who featured whilst on loan but returned to parent club during the season:
79	DF	(Argentina) ARG	Franco Carboni	19	0	9+8	0	2+0	0
Player(s) who featured but departed the club permanently during the season:
Player(s) who featured but departed the club on loan during the season:
8	MF	(Italy) ITA	Luca Belardinelli	9	0	4+3	0	2+0	0
29	DF	(Italy) ITA	Lorenzo Tosto	1	0	1+0	0	0+0	0
37	MF	(Poland) POL	Iwo Kaczmarski	1	0	0+1	0	0+0	0
90	FW	(Italy) ITA	Ismaël Konaté	5	0	0+5	0	0+0	0
