= 2023–24 Ternana Calcio season =

Ternana Calcio
2023–24 season
- Manager: Cristiano Lucarelli (until 6 November); Roberto Breda (from 6 November)
- Stadium: Stadio Libero Liberati
- Serie B: 16th (relegated)
- Coppa Italia: Round of 64
- Top goalscorer: League: Antonio Raimondo (7); All: Antonio Raimondo (7)

The 2023–24 season was the 99th in the history of Ternana Calcio and the fourth consecutive since their promotion from Serie C in 2020. Ternana participated in the Serie B and the Coppa Italia.

== Squad ==
Note: Flags indicate national team as defined under FIFA eligibility rules; some limited exceptions apply. Players may hold more than one non-FIFA nationality.

No.	Pos.	Nation	Player
—	GK	ITA	Antony Iannarilli
—	GK	ROU	Robert Matei
—	GK	BRA	Gabriel Brazão
—	DF	ARG	Tiago Casasola
—	DF	DEN	Frederik Sørensen
—	FW	ITA	Federico Dionisi
—	MF	ROU	Andrei Mărginean
—	MF	POL	Jakub Łabojko
—	MF	ITA	Federico Viviani
—	MF	NED	Kees de Boer

No.	Pos.	Nation	Player
—	MF	ITA	Giacomo Faticanti
—	MF	FRA	Ange Caumenan N'Guessan
—	MF	ARG	Franco Carboni
—	MF	ROU	Gabriele Boloca
—	MF	FRA	Salim Diakité
—	MF	FIN	Niklas Pyyhtiä
—	FW	ITA	Antonio Raimondo
—	FW	POL	Jan Żuberek

== Transfers ==
=== In ===
Pos.	Player	Transferred from	Fee	Date	Source
MF	(Finland) Niklas Pyyhtiä	(Italy) Bologna	Loan	17 August 2023	
MF	(Spain) Txus Alba	(Spain) Barcelona Atlètic	Free	18 August 2023	
FW	(Italy) Federico Dionisi	(Italy) Ascoli	Free	29 August 2023	
MF	(Italy) Federico Viviani	(Italy) Brescia	Free	8 September 2023	
MF	(Netherlands) Kees de Boer	Unattached	Free	15 September 2023	
MF	(Italy) Giacomo Faticanti	(Italy) Lecce	Loan	8 January 2024	
DF	(France) Ange Caumenan N'Guessan	(Italy) Torino	Loan	9 January 2024	
DF	(Argentina) Franco Carboni	(Italy) Internazionale	Loan	9 January 2024	
DF	(Romania) Gabriele Boloca	(Italy) Albenga		10 January 2024	
FW	(Poland) Jan Żuberek	(Italy) Internazionale U19	Loan	11 January 2024	

=== Out ===
Pos.	Player	Transferred to	Fee	Date	Source
MF	(Spain) Txus Alba	Released		16 November 2023	
DF	(Italy) Alessandro Celli	(Italy) Catania	Free	6 January 2024	
DF	(Italy) Niccolò Corrado	(Italy) Modena	Loan	8 January 2024	
FW	(Uruguay) César Falletti	(Italy) Cremonese	Free	9 January 2024	

== Pre-season and friendlies ==
Win Draw Loss Fixtures

23 July 2023 Friendly match	Ternana	24–0	Selezione del Cascia	Magrelli Active
		Report		Attendance: c. 100

30 July 2023 Friendly match	Ternana	12–0	Olimpia Thyrus	Magrelli Active

5 August 2023 Friendly match	Ternana	v	Sorrento	Magrelli Active
17:30
Note: The match was cancelld due to Sorrento's unavailability.

5 August 2023 Friendly match	Ternana	8–0	Ternana Primavera	Cascia
		Report

== Competitions ==
=== Overall record ===
Competition	First match	Last match	Starting round	Final position	Record							
Competition	First match	Last match	Starting round	Final position	Pld	W	D	L	GF	GA	GD	Win %
Serie B	19 August 2023	10 May 2024	Matchday 1	16th	38	11	10	17	43	50	−7	28.95
Coppa Italia	13 August 2023		Round of 64	Round of 64	1	0	0	1	0	1	−1	0.00
Total					39	11	10	18	43	51	−8	28.21

Last updated: 10 May 2024
Source: Competitions

=== Serie B ===
==== League table ====
Pos	Team	Pld	W	D	L	GF	GA	GD	Pts	Promotion, qualification or relegation
14	Cittadella	38	11	13	14	40	47	−7	46 (Note: Pisa finished ahead of Cittadella on head-to-head points: Pisa 2–1 Cittadella, Cittadella 0–1 Pisa.)	
15	Spezia	38	9	17	12	36	49	−13	44	
16	Ternana (R)	38	11	10	17	43	50	−7	43	Qualification for relegation play-out
17	Bari	38	8	17	13	38	49	−11	41 (Note: Bari finished ahead of Ascoli on head-to-head points: Bari 1–0 Ascoli, Ascoli 2–2 Bari.)	Qualification for relegation play-out
18	Ascoli (R)	38	9	14	15	38	42	−4	41	Relegation to Serie C

Source: Soccerway (in English)
Rules for classification: 1) Points; 2) Head-to-head points; 3) Head-to-head goal difference; 4) Goal difference; 5) Goals scored; 6) Draw.
(Note: Head-to-head record is used only after all the matches between the teams in question have been played)
(R) Relegated

==== Results summary ====
Overall								Home						Away					
Pld	W	D	L	GF	GA	GD	Pts	W	D	L	GF	GA	GD	W	D	L	GF	GA	GD
38	11	10	17	43	50	−7	43	5	7	7	16	16	0	6	3	10	27	34	−7

==== Results by round ====
Round	1	2	3	4	5	6	7	8	9	10	11	12	13	14	15	16	17	18	19	20	21	22	23	24	25	26	27	28	29	30	31	32	33	34	35	36	37	38
Ground	H	A	H	H	A	H	A	H	A	H	A	H	A	H	A	H	A	A	H	A	H	A	H	H	A	H	A	H	A	H	A	H	A	A	H	A	H	A
Result	L	L	L	D	L	D	L	W	D	L	L	L	D	D	W	W	W	L	D	L	W	L	L	D	W	D	W	L	L	W	L	D	W	D	L	L	W	W
Position	14	17	19	19	19	18	20	18	17	18	19	19	19	19	18	17	15	16	17	17	16	17	17	16	16	16	16	16	17	16	17	17	15	15	16	17	16	16

A = Away; H = Home; W = Win; D = Draw; L = Loss

==== Matches ====
The league fixtures were unveiled on 11 July 2023.

19 August 2023 1	Ternana	1–2	Sampdoria	Terni
20:30 CEST (UTC+2)				Stadium: Stadio Libero Liberati; Referee: Davide Di Marco

27 August 2023 2	Catanzaro	2–1	Ternana	Lecce
20:30 CEST (UTC+2)				Stadium: Stadio Via del Mare; Referee: Niccolò Baroni

30 August 2023 3	Ternana	0–1	Cremonese	Terni
20:30 CEST (UTC+2)			Coda 65'	Stadium: Stadio Libero Liberati; Referee: Gianluca Manganiello

3 September 2023 4	Ternana	0–0	Bari	Terni
18:30 CEST (UTC+2)				Stadium: Stadio Libero Liberati; Referee: Daniele Rutella

17 September 2023 5	Como	2–1	Ternana	Como
16:15 CEST (UTC+2)	Odenthal 83', 90+5'		Raimondo 74'	Stadium: Stadio Giuseppe Sinigaglia; Referee: Giuseppe Collu

23 September 2023 6	Ternana	1–1	Südtirol	Terni
14:00 CEST (UTC+2)				Stadium: Stadio Libero Liberati; Referee: Paride Tremolada

26 September 2023 7	Ascoli	2–0	Ternana	Ascoli Piceno
20:30 CEST (UTC+2)	Pedro Mendes 42' (pen.), 89'		Dionisi (penalty missed) 16'	Stadium: Stadio Cino e Lillo Del Duca; Referee: Gianluca Aureliano

30 September 2023 8	Ternana	3–0	Reggiana	Terni
16:15 CEST (UTC+2)				Stadium: Stadio Libero Liberati; Referee: Giovanni Ayroldi

7 October 2023 9	Cittadella	2–2	Ternana	Cittadella
16:15 CEST (UTC+2)				Stadium: Stadio Pier Cesare Tombolato; Referee: Niccolò Baroni

26 November 2023 14	Ternana	1–1	Palermo	Terni
16:15 CET (UTC+1)	Casasola 63'		Lucioni 31'	Stadium: Stadio Libero Liberati; Referee: Daniele Rutella

2 December 2023 15	Cosenza	1–3	Ternana	Cosenza
14:00 CET (UTC+1)				Stadium: Stadio San Vito-Luigi Marulla; Referee: Daniele Perenzoni

9 December 2023 16	Ternana	2–1	Feralpisalò	Terni
14:00 CET (UTC+1)				Stadium: Stadio Libero Liberati; Referee: Antonio Santoro

17 December 2023 17	Lecco	2–3	Ternana	Lecco
16:15 CET (UTC+1)		Report		Stadium: Stadio Rigamonti Ceppi; Referee: Daniele Minelli

23 December 2023 18	Parma	3–1	Ternana	Parma
14:00 CET (UTC+1)	Man 10'; Cyprien 52'; Bernabé 55'	Report	Raimondo 8'	Stadium: Stadio Ennio Tardini; Referee: Federico Dionisi

26 December 2023 19	Ternana	1–1	Pisa	Terni
15:00 CET (UTC+1)	Sørensen 46'	Report	Tramoni 23'	Stadium: Stadio Libero Liberati; Referee: Kevin Bonacina

13 January 2024 20	Bari	3–1	Ternana	Bari
14:00 CET (UTC+1)	Ricci 41'; Nasti 43'; Dorval 83'	Report	Diakité 86'	Stadium: Stadio San Nicola; Referee: Daniele Perenzoni

20 January 2024 21	Ternana	3–1	Cittadella	Terni
14:00 CET (UTC+1)	Carboni (yellow card) 9', (goal) 22'; Lucchesi 46'; Pereiro 61', (yellow card) 67'; De Boer (yellow card) 82'	Report	Pavan (yellow card) 27'; Pandolfi 40'; Negro (yellow card) 49'	Stadium: Stadio Libero Liberati; Referee: Marco Monaldi

27 January 2024 22	Venezia	1–0	Ternana	Venice
14:00 CET (UTC+1)		Report		Stadium: Stadio Pierluigi Penzo

13 April 2024 33	Cremonese	1–2	Ternana	Cremona
14:00 CEST (UTC+2)		Report		Stadium: Stadio Giovanni Zini; Referee: Francesco Cosso

20 April 2024 34	Brescia	0–0	Ternana	Brescia
14:00 CEST (UTC+2)		Report		Stadium: Stadio Mario Rigamonti; Referee: Kevin Bonacina

27 April 2024 35	Ternana	0–1	Ascoli	Terni
14:00 CEST (UTC+2)			Botteghin 90'	Stadium: Stadio Libero Liberati; Referee: Davide Ghersini

1 May 2024 36	Südtirol	4–3	Ternana	Bolzano
15:00	Odogwu 9'; Casiraghi 51', 75' (pen.); El Kaouakibi 85'		Pereiro 23'; Luperini 33', 67'	Stadium: Stadio Druso

5 May 2024 37	Ternana	1–0	Catanzaro	Terni
15:00 CEST (UTC+2)	Distefano 78'			Stadium: Stadio Libero Liberati

10 May 2024 38	Feralpisalò	0–1	Ternana	Piacenza
20:30 CEST (UTC+2)			Distefano 25'	Stadium: Stadio Leonardo Garilli

=== Coppa Italia Serie C ===
13 August 2023 Round of 64	Salernitana	1–0	Ternana	Salerno
17:45	Candreva 7'; Bradarić (yellow card) 39'; Kastanos (yellow card) 48'	Report	Diakité (yellow card) 90+5'; Bogdan (yellow card) 90+7'	Stadium: Stadio Arechi; Referee: Antonio Giua
