= Gabriele Guarino =

Italian footballer (born 2004)

Personal information
- Date of birth: 14 April 2004 (age 22)
- Place of birth: Molfetta, Italy
- Height: 1.93 m (6 ft 4 in)
- Position: Centre-back

Team information
- Current team: Samsunspor
- Number: 34

Youth career
- Bari
- 2018–2024: Empoli

Senior career*
Years	Team	Apps	(Gls)
2024–2026	Empoli	35	(3)
2024	→ Modena (loan)	0	(0)
2024–2025	→ Carrarese (loan)	16	(2)
2026–	Samsunspor		

International career^{‡}
2022	Italy U18	6	(0)
2022	Italy U19	3	(0)
2022–2023	Italy U20	10	(0)
2023–	Italy U21	4	(0)
Medal record
Men's football
Representing Italy
FIFA U-20 World Cup
Runner-up	2023 Argentina
Mediterranean Games
Runner-up	Oran 2022	U-18 Team
- * Club domestic league appearances and goals as of 30 May 2026 ‡ National team caps and goals as of 8 June 2026

Gabriele Guarino (born 14 April 2004) is an Italian professional footballer who plays as a defender for Süper Lig club Samsunspor.

== Club career ==
Born in Molfetta, Guarino is a youth product of SSC Bari and Empoli.

In February 2024, he was loaned to Modena in Serie B for the second half of the 2023–24 season, but a muscle injury prevented him from making his senior debut.

On the summer 2024, he was again loaned in Serie B for the 2025–26 season, this time to the Carrarese.

Guarino made his professional debut with the team from Carrara in a 3–0 Serie B win over Cittadella on 26 October 2024. He established himself as a starter in the second part of the season with the club, as they managed to avoid relegation.

Back at Empoli for the 2025–26 season, he became one of the leaders of the team as a centre-back in the Italian second tier.

== International career ==
Guarino is a youth international for Italy, having played for the under-18, under-19, under-20 and under-21.

In May 2026 he was first called to the national senior team for the training camp preceding the friendlies against Greece and Luxembourg, as interim coach Silvio Baldini decided to focus on young players after Italy failed to qualify for the World Cup.

== Honours ==
Italy U20

- FIFA U-20 World Cup runner-up: 2023
