= Brando Moruzzi =

Italian footballer (born 2004)

Personal information
- Date of birth: 20 July 2004 (age 22)
- Place of birth: Florence, Italy
- Height: 1.84 m (6 ft 0 in)
- Position: Left-back

Team information
- Current team: Avellino (on loan from Juventus)
- Number: 27

Youth career
- Cattolica Virtus
- Siena
- Empoli

Senior career*
Years	Team	Apps	(Gls)
2021–2022	Sangiovannese	16	(1)
2022–	Juventus	0	(0)
2022	→ Sangiovannese (loan)	12	(0)
2023–2025	→ Pescara (loan)	48	(1)
2025–2026	→ Empoli (loan)	28	(0)
2026–	→ Avellino (loan)	11	(1)

International career^{‡}
2025–	Italy U21	4	(0)
- * Club domestic league appearances and goals as of 7 November 2026 ‡ National team caps and goals as of 23:45, 1 October 2026 (UTC)

Brando Moruzzi (born 20 July 2004) is an Italian professional footballer who plays as left-back for Serie B club Avellino, on loan from Juventus.

== Club career ==
Moruzzi began his career at Cattolica Virtus, before joining Siena, Empoli. On 27 January 2022, Juventus bought him from Serie D club Sangiovanese and loaned him back for six months. Upon returning to Juventus, he made 18 appearances for Juventus U19. In 2023, he moved to Pescara.

On 26 July 2025, Moruzzi was loaned from Juventus by Empoli, with an option to buy.

On 10 July 2026, Moruzzi moved on a new loan to Avellino.

== Career statistics ==
As of match played 28 May 2025

Appearances and goals by club, season and competition
Club	Season	League			National Cup		Other		Total	
Club	Season	Division	Apps	Goals	Apps	Goals	Apps	Goals	Apps	Goals
Sangiovannese	2021–22	Serie D	28	1	—		0	0	28	1
Pescara	2023–24	Serie C	17	0	0	0	0	0	17	0
Pescara	2024–25	Serie C	37	0	1	0	0	0	38	0
Pescara	Total		54	0	1	0	0	0	55	0
Career total			28	1	0	0	0	0	28	1
