= Franco Carboni =

Argentine footballer (born 2003)

Personal information
- Full name: Franco Ezequiel Carboni
- Date of birth: 4 April 2003 (age 23)
- Place of birth: Buenos Aires, Argentina
- Height: 1.90 m (6 ft 3 in)
- Positions: Left-back; left midfielder

Team information
- Current team: Parma
- Number: 29

Youth career
- 2011–2019: Lanús
- 2019–2020: Catania
- 2020–2022: Inter Milan

Senior career*
Years	Team	Apps	(Gls)
2022–2026	Inter Milan	0	(0)
2022–2023	→ Cagliari (loan)	13	(0)
2023–2024	→ Monza (loan)	3	(0)
2024	→ Ternana (loan)	19	(1)
2024	→ River Plate (loan)	0	(0)
2024–2025	→ Venezia (loan)	8	(0)
2025–2026	→ Empoli (loan)	17	(0)
2026	→ Parma (loan)	7	(0)
2026–	Parma	0	(0)

International career^{‡}
2021	Italy U18	1	(1)
2022	Argentina U20	3	(0)
- * Club domestic league appearances and goals as of 25 May 2026 ‡ National team caps and goals as of 10 June 2022

Franco Ezequiel Carboni (born 4 April 2003) is an Argentine professional footballer who plays as a left-back or left midfielder for Serie A club Parma. Born in Argentina, Carboni represented both Italy and Argentina internationally at youth level.

== Club career ==
Carboni started his career in his native Argentina with Lanús, before leaving for Italy at the age of sixteen, when his father accepted the job of youth coordinator at Catania. He only spent five months with Catania before his performances caught the attention of clubs across Europe. He signed for Inter Milan in January 2020.

Having signed a new contract with the Nerazzurri in April 2022, on 11 July 2022 of the same year Carboni was loaned out to Serie B club Cagliari for the rest of the season. On 24 January 2023, he was recalled and subsequently loaned out to Serie A club Monza until the end of the campaign, with the deal including an option-to-buy for Monza and a counter-option for Inter Milan.

On 9 January 2024, Carboni was recalled from Monza and joined Serie B club Ternana on loan for the remainder of the season. On 20 January, he scored his first professional goal in a 3–1 league win over Cittadella.

On 12 July 2024, Carboni returned to Argentina by joining Primera División club River Plate on an 18-month loan, with an option to buy and a buyback clause in favour of Inter. Following the sacking of manager Martín Demichelis and the appointing of the returning Marcelo Gallardo, Carboni's spell with Los Milionarios came to an end after less than two months and without any official appearance, as he was not part of the new manager's plans. Subsequently, on 30 August 2024, Carboni officially joined Serie A club Venezia on a season-long loan.

On 17 July 2025, Carboni joined Serie B side Empoli on a season-long loan with an obligation to buy.

On 29 January 2026, he moved on a new loan to Parma, with an option to buy. On 2 July 2026, Carboni officially joined the Emilian side on a permanent basis.

== International career ==
Born in Buenos Aires, Argentina, Carboni is eligible to represent both Italy and Argentina at international level. Having played for the Italy U18 national team in 2021, scoring in a 3–1 friendly win over Austria, he switched allegiance to his native Argentina and was called up to the Argentina national team in 2022.

In June 2022, he took part in the Maurice Revello Tournament in France with Argentina team.

== Style of play ==
Initially a forward at Lanús, Carboni moved further down the pitch during his time in Italy, and mostly operates as a left wing-back or left midfielder.

== Personal life ==
Franco hails from a footballing family, with father Ezequiel having played for teams in Argentina and Europe. His brother, Valentín, is also a footballer. Carboni holds both Argentine and Italian passports.

== Career statistics ==
=== Club ===
As of match played 10 January 2026

Appearances and goals by club, season and competition
Club	Season	League			Coppa Italia		Europe		Other		Total	
Club	Season	Division	Apps	Goals	Apps	Goals	Apps	Goals	Apps	Goals	Apps	Goals
Inter Milan	2022–23	Serie A	—		—		—		—		0	0
Inter Milan	2023–24	Serie A	—		—		—		—		0	0
Inter Milan	Total		0	0	0	0	0	0	0	0	0	0
Cagliari (loan)	2022–23	Serie B	13	0	1	0	—		—		14	0
Monza (loan)	2022–23	Serie A	3	0	—		—		—		3	0
Monza (loan)	2023–24	Serie A	0	0	1	0	—		—		1	0
Monza (loan)	Total		3	0	1	0	0	0	0	0	4	0
Ternana (loan)	2023–24	Serie B	19	1	—		—		2 (Note: Appearances in Serie B relegation play-out)	0	21	1
Venezia (loan)	2024–25	Serie A	8	0	—		—		—		8	0
Empoli (loan)	2025–26	Serie B	17	0	2	0	—		—		19	0
Career total			60	1	4	0	0	0	2	0	66	1
