= Stiven Shpendi =

Albanian footballer (born 2003)

Personal information
- Date of birth: 19 May 2003 (age 23)
- Place of birth: Ancona, Italy
- Height: 1.81 m (5 ft 11 in)
- Position: Forward

Team information
- Current team: Empoli
- Number: 11

Youth career
- Real Metauro
- Delfino Fano
- –2019: San Marino
- 2019–2021: Cesena

Senior career*
Years	Team	Apps	(Gls)
2021–2025	Cesena	31	(12)
2023–2024	→ Empoli (loan)	12	(0)
2024–2025	→ Carrarese (loan)	25	(4)
2025–	Empoli	35	(15)

International career^{‡}
2021	Albania U19	8	(3)
2022	Albania U20	2	(1)
2022–	Albania U21	8	(3)
- * Club domestic league appearances and goals as of 13 May 2026 ‡ National team caps and goals as of 14 October 2023

Stiven Shpendi (born 19 May 2003) is an Albanian professional footballer who plays as a forward for Serie B club Empoli. Born in Italy, he plays for the Albania under-21 national team.

== Club career ==
=== Early career ===
Shpendi was born in Ancona, Italy, alongside his twin brother, Cristian, to Albanian parents from Pukë who immigrated to Italy in 1997. The twins began their youth careers at Real Metauro, before moving to Delfino Fano and then San Marino's academy, eventually joining Cesena.

The twins began their competitive careers at Cesena with the under-17 team, making 16 appearances each in the Allievi Nazionali U17 league, where Stiven scored 11 goals and Cristian 11. They subsequently joined the club's Primavera side for the 2020–21 Campionato Primavera 3, scoring 13 and 15 goals respectively and helping Cesena reach the final, where they lost to Arezzo.

In the following season, Shpendi scored 23 goals in 20 matches to finish as the league's top scorer appearances in the 2021–22 Campionato Primavera 2, while his brother scored 15 in 17, helping Cesena win the championship and earn promotion to Primavera 1. The twins also scored twice each in a 4–1 victory over Udinese in the Primavera 2 Super Cup. During the same season, Shpendi was promoted to the first team and made his professional debut under manager William Viali on 10 October 2021 against Ancona-Matelica in the 2021–22 Serie C, replacing Mattia Bortolussi in the last minutes of the match. On 25 February 2022, the twins extended their contracts with Cesena until 2025. He concluded his first season with the senior squad by making two appearances.

Shpendi begun the new season by scoring his first professional goal in team's 2–1 win against Carrarese on 4 September 2022. After cementing his place in the lineup in the first weeks of the season, he fell out of favor as manager Toscano relegated him to bench for the next five league games. Shpendi played as a substitute in the matchday 14 against Ancona-Matelica, and a week later returned as a starter against Olbia, but suffered a knee injury which kept him sidelined for the next two weeks.

Shpendi returned from injury on 10 December 2022, by appearing as a second-half substitute against Vis Pesaro, scoring his side's winning goal in the process. Later on in the season, he regained his spot in the starting line-up, notably scoring a brace in a 3–0 away win over Pontedera, as Cesena climbed to the second spot in the championship.

=== Empoli ===
On 5 August 2023, Shpendi joined Serie A club Empoli on a two-season loan, with an obligation to buy. It was reported that the deal commanded a €2 million fee, plus €400,000 in add-ons, and a 15% sell-on clause in favor of Cesena.

He made his debut for the club on 12 August 2023, coming on as a substitute for Liam Henderson in the 67th minute of a 2–1 Coppa Italia loss to Cittadella. He then made his top-flight debut one week later, coming on for Matteo Cancellieri in the 70th minute of a 1–0 home defeat to Hellas Verona.

On 30 August 2024 (with his rights still held by Cesena), Shpendi was loaned by Empoli to Serie B club Carrarese for the 2024–25 season.

== International career ==
In November 2021, Shpendi featured for the Albania national under-19 team by coach Armando Cungu in the 2020 UEFA European Under-19 Championship qualification playing initially as a starter where was replaced at half-time by his twin Cristian, and made a late substitute appearance in the closing match, while Albania finished level on four points with Serbia but were eliminated on goal difference.

He subsequently played for the Albania under-20 managed by coach Alban Bushi in September 2022 in Croatia against North Macedonia and Croatia where his side lost both matches with the same result 3–1 with Shpendi scoring the only goal against Croatia.

Coach Alban Bushi then gave the twins their debut with Albania under-21 on 16 November 2022 including in the starting line up.

== Career statistics ==
=== Club ===
As of match played 20 February 2026

Club statistics
Club	Season	League			Cup		Europe (Note: Including continental competitions, such as UEFA Champions League and UEFA Europa League)		Other (Note: Including other competitions, such as Supercups)		Total	
Club	Season	Division	Apps	Goals	Apps	Goals	Apps	Goals	Apps	Goals	Apps	Goals
Cesena	2021–22	Serie C	2	0	0	0	—		—		2	0
Cesena	2022–23	Serie C	29	12	1	0	—		4	0	34	12
Cesena	Total		31	12	1	0	0	0	4	0	36	12
Empoli (loan)	2023–24	Serie A	12	0	1	0	—		—		13	0
Carrarese (loan)	2024–25	Serie B	25	4	0	0	—		—		25	4
Empoli	2025–26	Serie B	24	9	2	0	—		—		26	9
Empoli	Empoli total		36	9	3	0	0	0	0	0	39	9
Career total			92	25	4	0	0	0	4	0	100	25
