= Duccio Degli Innocenti =

Italian footballer (born 2003)

Personal information
- Full name: Duccio Degli Innocenti
- Date of birth: 28 April 2003 (age 23)
- Place of birth: Montevarchi, Italy
- Height: 1.78 m (5 ft 10 in)
- Position: Defensive midfielder

Team information
- Current team: Empoli
- Number: 6

Youth career
- 2017–2022: Empoli

Senior career*
| Years | Team | Apps | (Gls) |
| 2022– | Empoli | 25 | (0) |
| 2023–2024 | → Lecco (loan) | 29 | (0) |
| 2024–2025 | → Spezia (loan) | 17 | (0) |

International career^{‡}
| 2019–2020 | Italy U17 | 9 | (0) |
| 2021 | Italy U18 | 1 | (0) |
| 2021–2022 | Italy U19 | 5 | (1) |
| 2022–2023 | Italy U20 | 5 | (0) |
Medal record
Men's football
Representing Italy
FIFA U-20 World Cup
| Runner-up | 2023 Argentina |
- * Club domestic league appearances and goals as of 13 May 2026 ‡ National team caps and goals as of 3 June 2023

Duccio Degli Innocenti (born 28 April 2003) is an Italian professional footballer who plays as a defensive midfielder for Serie B club Empoli.

== Club career ==
Degli Innocenti was raised in the youth system of Empoli. He represented the club in the 2021–22 UEFA Youth League.

Degli Innocenti made his debut for the senior squad of Empoli on 6 August 2022 in a Coppa Italia game against SPAL. He made his Serie A debut on 21 October 2022 against Juventus.

On 9 August 2023, he joined Lecco on loan.

On 2 August 2024, he joined Spezia on loan.

== International career ==
Degli Innocenti was first called up to represent his country for Under-17 squad friendlies in September 2019. He then played in Under-17 Euro qualifiers before the tournament was abandoned due to the COVID-19 pandemic.

He then represented Italy at the 2022 UEFA European Under-19 Championship, where Italy reached the semi-finals: Degli Innocenti made one appearance in a group stage game.

In May 2023, he was included by head coach Carmine Nunziata in the Italian squad that took part in the FIFA U-20 World Cup in Argentina, where the Azzurrini finished runners-up after losing to Uruguay in the final match.

== Honours ==
Italy U20

- FIFA U-20 World Cup runner-up: 2023
