= Ezequiel Carboni =

Argentine footballer

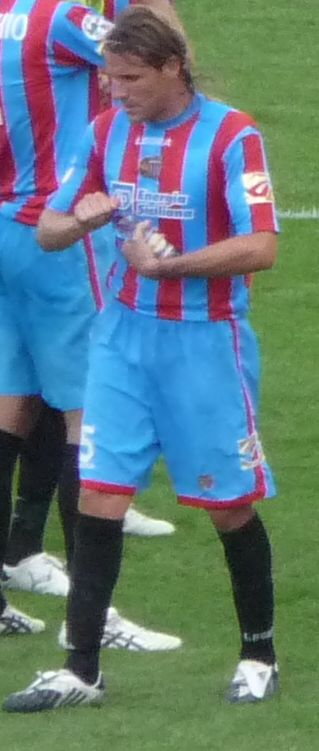
- Carboni in 2009 with Catania

Personal information
- Full name: Ezequiel Alejo Carboni
- Date of birth: 4 April 1979 (age 47)
- Place of birth: Buenos Aires, Argentina
- Height: 1.79 m (5 ft 10 in)
- Position: Midfielder

Team information
- Current team: Talleres (reserves manager)

Youth career
- 1996–1998: Lanús

Senior career*
Years	Team	Apps	(Gls)
1998–2005	Lanús	189	(2)
2005–2008	Red Bull Salzburg	98	(5)
2008–2011	Catania	78	(0)
2011–2012	Banfield	14	(0)
Total		379	(7)

Managerial career
- 2017–2018: Lanús
- 2018: Argentinos Juniors
- 2019–2020: Catania (youth)
- 2020: Chiasso
- 2022–2023: Monza (youth)
- 2026–: Talleres (reserves)
- 2026: Talleres (interim)
- * Club domestic league appearances and goals

Ezequiel Alejo Carboni (born 4 April 1979) is an Argentine professional football coach and a former player who played as a midfielder. He is the current manager of Talleres' reserve team.

Carboni is the father of fellow footballers Franco and Valentín Carboni.

== Playing career ==
=== Club Atlético Lanús ===
Born in Buenos Aires, Carboni started his career with Club Atlético Lanús with the youth system in 1996. He was promoted to the first team and played in the Primera Division Argentina from 1998 to 2005. With the club, Carboni went on to make over 200 appearances in all competitions while scoring 4 goals. After his seven-year spell with the Argentine club, he was linked with a transfer to Europe and eventually signed for Red Bull Salzburg in July 2005.

=== Red Bull Salzburg ===
In July 2005, Carboni signed for the Austrian club on a three-year contract, where he would go on to spend three seasons, winning two Austrian Bundesliga titles. During his time with the club, he was an integral part of the club's success, as he made just over 100 appearances for the club in all competitions while scoring an impressive eight goals. After his successful stint in Austria, he was scouted by Calcio Catania of the Serie A.

=== Calcio Catania ===
In June 2008, Carboni, who also holds Italian citizenship, was signed by Serie A club Calcio Catania on a three-year deal. He was one of eleven new players brought in by the Sicilian club during the 2008 summer transfer window. His first season in Sicily started off with several injury problems, but he has been regularly included in the club's starting eleven, and has formed a solid midfield partnership with Italian international, Marco Biagianti. During the 2009–10 Serie A campaign, Carboni was a regular in the starting XI, proving to be a decisive player in the team yet again, making 28 league appearances, and helping Catania reach salvation for the fourth consecutive season, as the club ended the season with a record number of points for the club, finishing in 12th position, under head coach Siniša Mihajlović. Carboni made 25 Serie A appearances for Catania in the 2010–11 Serie A.

=== Banfield ===
Following his release by Catania, Carboni returned to Argentina for the first time in six years since joining Red Bull Salzburg, joining Club Atlético Banfield on a free transfer. However, Banfield played poorly and the club went to the bottom of the league. However, Carboni's time at Banfield was over after 14 appearances for the club because he was forced to quit the club after he was spotted buying replica shirts of the team's arch-rivals, Club Atlético Lanús. Fans were enraged when the picture appeared in Argentine media, particularly given Carboni's poor start to the season, and the 32-year-old decided that it was best if he and his employers went their separate ways.

"I talked it through with the club's directors and my agent, and we realised that the atmosphere was not going to get better," Carboni interview following his release from Banfield.

== Coaching career ==
After retirement, he was appointed by Lanús as a youth coach. He was named by Lanús as the club's head coach in December 2017. After a string of negative results, Carboni resigned voluntarily on 26 August 2018.

He subsequently served as head coach of Argentinos Juniors from September to November 2018, resigning after achieving only a single point in six games in charge of the team.

In July 2019, he agreed to return to Catania, now in Serie C, as head of the club's youth coaching staff. He left the club a year later to accept an offer from Inter Milan as a scout, joining his two sons Franco and Valentín who are part of the club's youth system.

In August 2020, he joined Swiss club FC Chiasso as a technical director, serving in his new role for just a handful of days.

In August 2022, Carboni joined Monza's youth coaching staff, as assistant to Under-16 coach Riccardo Monguzzi. A month later, in September 2022, he was promoted as head of the Under-18 youth team, following a reshuffle led by the appointment of Under-19 coach Raffaele Palladino in charge of the first team.
