= Andrea Fulignati =

Italian footballer (born 1994)

Personal information
- Date of birth: 31 October 1994 (age 32)
- Place of birth: Empoli, Italy
- Height: 1.90 m (6 ft 3 in)
- Position: Goalkeeper

Team information
- Current team: Cremonese

Youth career
- –2011: Sestese
- 2012–2015: Palermo

Senior career*
Years	Team	Apps	(Gls)
2011–2012	Sestese	32	(0)
2012–2017	Palermo	9	(0)
2013	→ Sestese (loan)		
2015–2016	→ Trapani (loan)	4	(0)
2017–2018	Cesena	36	(0)
2018–2019	Empoli	0	(0)
2019–2021	Ascoli	0	(0)
2019	→ SPAL (loan)	0	(0)
2019–2021	→ Perugia (loan)	33	(0)
2021–2022	Perugia	0	(0)
2022–2025	Catanzaro	72	(0)
2024–2025	→ Cremonese (loan)	38	(0)
2025–	Cremonese	0	(0)
2025–2026	→ Empoli (loan)	38	(0)

International career
2013	Italy U-19	3	(0)
- * Club domestic league appearances and goals as of 13 May 2026

Andrea Fulignati (born 31 October 1994) is an Italian professional footballer who plays as a goalkeeper for Serie B club Cremonese.

== Career ==
Born in Empoli, and a youth product of small Tuscan team Sestese, he was scouted by Palermo and signed for the Under-19 youth team in 2012. He successively became third-choice keeper for the first time in the following years.

In 2015 he was loaned out to Serie B club Trapani to get more first-team experience, but ended up playing only three games during the season, as Nícolas became the first choice.

He successively returned to Palermo in 2016 to be the reserve of Josip Posavec for the Serie A club. He made his debut in the Italian top flight on 12 March 2017 in a home match against Roma, lost with the result of 0–3. He successively managed to break into the starting lineup for the last remaining league games, eventually overtaking Posavec as first choice and playing a total eight games throughout the entire season.

On 27 July 2018, Fulignati joined to Serie A team Empoli a 3-years contract.

After only 6-month Fulignati joined to Ascoli until 30 June 2021.

On 31 January 2019, Fulignati joined to SPAL on loan until 30 June 2019.

On 2 September 2019, he joined Perugia on loan until 30 June 2021, with Nicola Leali moved to opposite direction. On 23 February 2021, he signed a new contract with Perugia until 30 June 2024.

On 28 June 2022, Fulignati signed a two-year contract with Catanzaro.

On 4 July 2024, Fulignati joined Cremonese on loan with an obligation to buy.

On 29 July 2025, Fulignati returned to Empoli on loan with a conditional obligation to buy.
