= Salvatore Elia =

Italian footballer (born 1999)

Personal information
- Date of birth: 30 June 1999 (age 27)
- Place of birth: Prato, Italy
- Height: 1.83 m (6 ft 0 in)
- Position: Forward

Team information
- Current team: Cremonese
- Number: 71

Youth career
- –2018: Atalanta

Senior career*
Years	Team	Apps	(Gls)
2018–2023	Atalanta	0	(0)
2018–2020	→ Juve Stabia (loan)	50	(3)
2020–2021	→ Perugia (loan)	36	(8)
2021–2022	→ Benevento (loan)	25	(1)
2022–2023	→ Palermo (loan)	10	(3)
2023–2025	Spezia	63	(3)
2025–2026	Empoli	33	(2)
2026–	Cremonese	1	(0)

International career
2016	Italy U17	1	(0)
2016	Italy U18	2	(0)
- * Club domestic league appearances and goals as of 22 August 2026

Salvatore Elia (born 30 June 1999) is an Italian professional footballer who plays as a forward for Serie B club Cremonese.

== Club career ==
=== Atalanta ===
Born in Prato, Elia grew up playing in the youth teams of Atalanta.

==== Loan to Juve Stabia ====
On 31 July 2018. Elia was signed by Serie C club Juve Stabia on a season-long loan deal. On 16 September he made his professional debut, in Serie C, as a substitute replacing Luigi Canotto in the 72nd minute of a 3–0 away win over Siracusa. On 20 November he played his first entire match for the team, a 4–0 home win over Viterbese Castrense. Two weeks later, on 2 December, Elia scored his first professional goal in the 85th minute of a 2–0 home win over Bisceglie. On 14 April 2019, he scored his second goal in the 71st minute of a 3–2 away win over Sicula Leonzio. Elia then scored his third goal in the 78th minute in a 2–2 home draw against Virtus Entella in the Supercoppa di Serie C on 18 May. He helped Juve Stabia win promotion to Serie B, with the club finishing as champions, and ended his loan spell with 32 appearances, 3 goals and 6 assists.

On 11 July 2019, his loan was extended for another season. One month later, on 11 August, Elia played his first match of the season, a 3–2 defeat on penalties after a 1–1 home draw against Imolese in the second round of the Coppa Italia. On 25 August he made his Serie B debut for Juve Stabia as a substitute replacing Giacomo Calò in the 82nd minute of a 2–1 away defeat against Empoli. One week later, on 1 September Elia played his first match as a starter, a 2–0 home defeat against Pisa, he was replaced after 68 minutes by Massimiliano Carlini. Two weeks later he played his first entire match for the club in Serie B, a 0–0 away draw against Perugia. On 20 June 2019, he scored his first goal in Serie B, as a substitute, in the 87th minute of a 3–1 away defeat against Pescara. Elia ended his second season at Juve Stabia with 21 appearances, 1 goal and 1 assist, however the club was relegated to Serie C.

==== Loan to Perugia ====
On 25 September 2020, he joined Serie C club Perugia on a season-long loan deal. Two days later, on 27 September, he made his debut for the club as a substitute replacing Vlad Dragomir in the 77th minute of a 2–2 home draw against Alma Juventus Fano. On 18 October he played his first entire match for the club, a 2–0 home win over Fermana. On 6 December he scored his first goal for the club in the 29th minute of a 2–0 home win over Imolese. On 17 February 2021, Elia scored twice in a 4–0 home win over Legnago Salus. Elia ended his season-long loan to Perugia with 40 appearances, 30 of them as a starter, 9 goals and 4 assists, he also helped the club to win the championship and to gain the promotion in Serie B after only one season in Serie C.

==== Loan to Benevento ====
On 20 July 2021, Elia joined Serie B club Benevento on a season-long loan.

==== Loan to Palermo ====
On 28 July 2022, Elia agreed upon a one-year loan to Serie B club Palermo.

=== Spezia ===
On 1 September 2023, Elia signed a three-year contract with Spezia.

=== Empoli ===
On 8 August 2025, Elia moved to Empoli.

== Personal life ==
He is the son of former professional footballer Firmino Elia.

== Career statistics ==
=== Club ===
As of 18 July 2021

Club	Season	League			Cup		Europe		Other		Total	
Club	Season	League	Apps	Goals	Apps	Goals	Apps	Goals	Apps	Goals	Apps	Goals
Juve Stabia (loan)	2018–19	Serie C	30	2	0	0	—		2 (Note: All appearances in Supercoppa di Serie C)	1	32	3
Juve Stabia (loan)	2019–20	Serie B	20	1	1	0	—		—		21	1
Perugia (loan)	2020–21	Serie C	36	8	2	0	—		2	1	40	9
Career total			86	11	3	0	—		4	1	93	13

== Honours ==
=== Club ===
Juve Stabia

- Serie C (Group C): 2018–19

Perugia

- Serie C (Group B): 2020–21
