= Valentín Carboni =

Argentine footballer (born 2005)

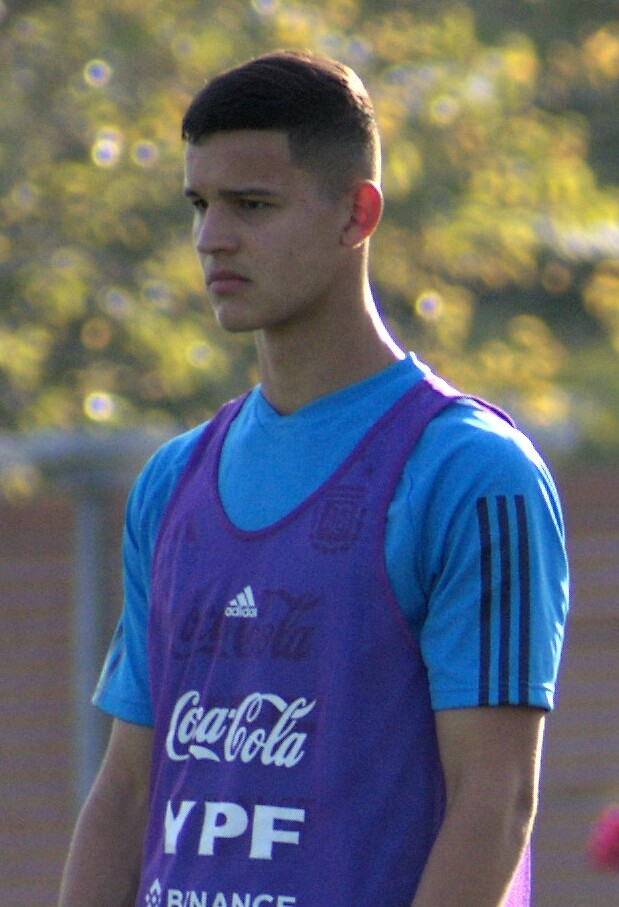
- Carboni with Argentina U20 in 2023

Personal information
- Full name: Valentín Carboni
- Date of birth: 5 March 2005 (age 21)
- Place of birth: Buenos Aires, Argentina
- Height: 1.85 m (6 ft 1 in)
- Position: Attacking midfielder

Team information
- Current team: Racing Club (on loan from Inter Milan)
- Number: 21

Youth career
- 2013–2019: Lanús
- 2019–2020: Catania
- 2020–2022: Inter Milan

Senior career*
Years	Team	Apps	(Gls)
2022–	Inter Milan	5	(0)
2023–2024	→ Monza (loan)	31	(2)
2024–2025	→ Marseille (loan)	4	(0)
2025–2026	→ Genoa (loan)	12	(0)
2026–	→ Racing Club (loan)	5	(0)

International career^{‡}
2021–2022	Italy U17	11	(4)
2022–	Argentina U20	7	(2)
2024–	Argentina	3	(0)
Medal record
Men's football
Representing Argentina
Copa América
Winner	2024 United States
- * Club domestic league appearances and goals as of 14 February 2026 ‡ National team caps and goals as of 29 June 2024

Valentín Carboni (born 5 March 2005) is an Argentine professional footballer who plays as an attacking midfielder for Primera División club Racing Club, on loan from Serie A club Inter Milan, and the Argentina national team.

== Club career ==
=== Early years ===
Born in Buenos Aires, in his early childhood, Carboni played futsal at the grassroots team Club Lafuente in Lanús. In 2013, at the age of eight, he started playing football by joining the youth academy of Lanús.

In July 2019, Carboni joined the youth sector of Italian side Catania, together with his older brother Franco and his father Ezequiel, who had just taken on a double role as youth coach and head of youth development at the club.

=== Inter Milan ===
==== 2020–2022: Youth sector ====
One year later, after having attracted the interest of several high-profile European clubs, the Carboni brothers both joined Serie A club Inter Milan, for an estimated €300,000 transfer fee.

Carboni quickly came through the Nerazzurri's youth ranks, establishing himself as part of the under-19 squad since the start of the 2021–22 season, and helping said team win the under-19 national championship in 2022.

==== 2022–23 season: First team debut ====
At the start of the 2022–23 season, while keeping featuring for the Primavera team in the national league and in the UEFA Youth League, Carboni started training with Inter Milan's first team under head coach Simone Inzaghi. Carboni subsequently made his professional debut on 1 October 2022 at 17 years and 206 days, coming on as a substitute for Federico Dimarco in the 88th minute of a 2–1 league loss against Roma. On 1 November, he made his UEFA Champions League debut, replacing Joaquín Correa in the 76th minute of a 2–0 group stage loss against Bayern Munich. In July 2023, Carboni signed a new long-term contract with Inter Milan.

==== 2023–24 season: Loan moves ====
On 15 July 2023, Carboni officially joined fellow Serie A club Monza on a season-long loan. On 1 December, he scored his first professional goal in a 2–1 home league defeat against Juventus.

On 7 August 2024, Carboni joined French club Olympique de Marseille on a season-long loan with an option to buy and a counter-option in favour of Inter. In October 2024, during the international break, Carboni suffered a torn anterior cruciate ligament, ruling him out for a lengthy period of time.

==== 2025: Return to Inter ====
On 11 February 2025, Carboni's loan move was terminated early to continue his rehabilitation process with the Nerazzurri in preparation for the 2025 FIFA Club World Cup. Later that year, on 21 June, he scored his first goal for the club in the stoppage time of a 2–1 victory against Urawa Red Diamonds during the FIFA Club World Cup.

==== 2025–26 season: Loan to Genoa ====
On 18 July 2025, Carboni joined fellow Serie A club Genoa on a season-long loan. He made his official debut for Genoa the same year on 15 August, starting in the first round of the Coppa Italia against Vicenza. Genoa won the match 3–0, with Carboni scoring the opening goal.

==== 2026: Loan to Racing Club ====
On 8 January 2026, Carboni's loan spell at Genoa was terminated, and he subsequently joined Argentine side Racing Club on loan until 31 December 2026.

== International career ==
Due to having dual citizenship of Italy and Argentina, Carboni is eligible to represent both countries at the international level.

=== Italy youth ===
In 2019, he was involved in several training camps with the Italian under-15 national team. He went on to play for the under-17 national team between 2021 and 2022.

=== Argentina youth ===
In March 2022, Carboni switched his international allegiance to Argentina and received his first official call-up to the Argentine senior national team, having been included in the preliminary list for the 2022 FIFA World Cup qualification matches against Venezuela and Ecuador.

Later that May, Carboni was included by head coach Javier Mascherano in the Argentine under-20 squad that took part in the Maurice Revello Tournament in France, as the Albiceleste eventually finished in fifth place, after winning the play-off match against Japan. In October, Carboni was included by head coach Lionel Scaloni in Argentina's preliminary squad for the 2022 FIFA World Cup in Qatar, but did not make the final 26-man list.

In March 2023, Carboni was called up again to the Argentina senior national team for two friendly matches against Panama and Curaçao. The same year in May, he was included in the final squad for the 2023 FIFA U-20 World Cup in Argentina. On the debut on 20 May he scored his first goal in a 2–1 victory against Uzbekistan.

=== Argentina senior ===
Carboni made his debut for the senior Argentina national team on 26 March 2024 in a friendly against Costa Rica, substituting Ángel Di María in the 82nd minute.

In June 2024, and with only two matches played with Argentina senior team, Carboni was included in Lionel Scaloni's final 26-man Argentina squad for the 2024 Copa América.

== Style of play ==
Carboni is a left-footed attacking midfielder who mainly operates in the number 10 role, but can also play as a centre-forward, an inverted winger on the right side, or a mezzala. An elegant, composed, and creative player, he frequently moves between his team's attacking lines, whether he keeps possession with his ball control, finds teammates via through passes or first-touch combinations, or directly goes for the shot from short or long range.

Despite being mainly regarded for his offensive contributions, much to his vision, individual technique, and dribbling skills, Carboni has proved to be effective in the defensive side of his game as well, especially because of his work rate. He named compatriot Lionel Messi as his biggest source of inspiration.

In September 2022, Carboni was included in The Guardian's list of the 60 best talents in the world to be born in 2005.

== Personal life ==
Carboni is the son of former Argentine footballer Ezequiel Carboni.

His older brother Franco (born 2003) is a footballer himself: the two played together in the youth sectors of Lanús, Catania and Inter Milan.

He also has two younger siblings, Cristiano (born 2009) and Alma (born 2016).

== Career statistics ==
=== Club ===
As of match played 14 February 2026

Appearances and goals by club, season and competition
Club	Season	League			National cup (Note: Includes Coppa Italia)		Europe		Other		Total	
Club	Season	Division	Apps	Goals	Apps	Goals	Apps	Goals	Apps	Goals	Apps	Goals
Inter Milan	2022–23	Serie A	5	0	0	0	1 (Note: Appearance in UEFA Champions League)	0	0	0	6	0
Inter Milan	2024–25	Serie A	–		–		–		3 (Note: Appearances in FIFA Club World Cup)	1	3	1
Inter Milan	Total		5	0	0	0	1	0	3	1	9	1
Monza (loan)	2023–24	Serie A	31	2	1	0	–		–		32	2
Marseille (loan)	2024–25	Ligue 1	4	0	–		–		–		4	0
Genoa (loan)	2025–26	Serie A	12	0	3	1	–		–		15	1
Racing (loan)	2026	Primera División	5	0	0	0	0	0	–		5	0
Career total			57	2	4	1	1	0	3	1	65	4

=== International ===
As of match played 29 June 2024

Appearances and goals by national team and year
National team	Year	Apps	Goals
Argentina	2024	3	0
Total		3	0

== Honours ==
Inter Milan U19

- Campionato Primavera 1: 2021–22

Inter Milan

- Coppa Italia: 2022–23
- Supercoppa Italiana: 2022
- UEFA Champions League runner-up: 2022–23

Argentina

- Copa América: 2024
