= Luca Belardinelli =

Italian footballer (born 2001)

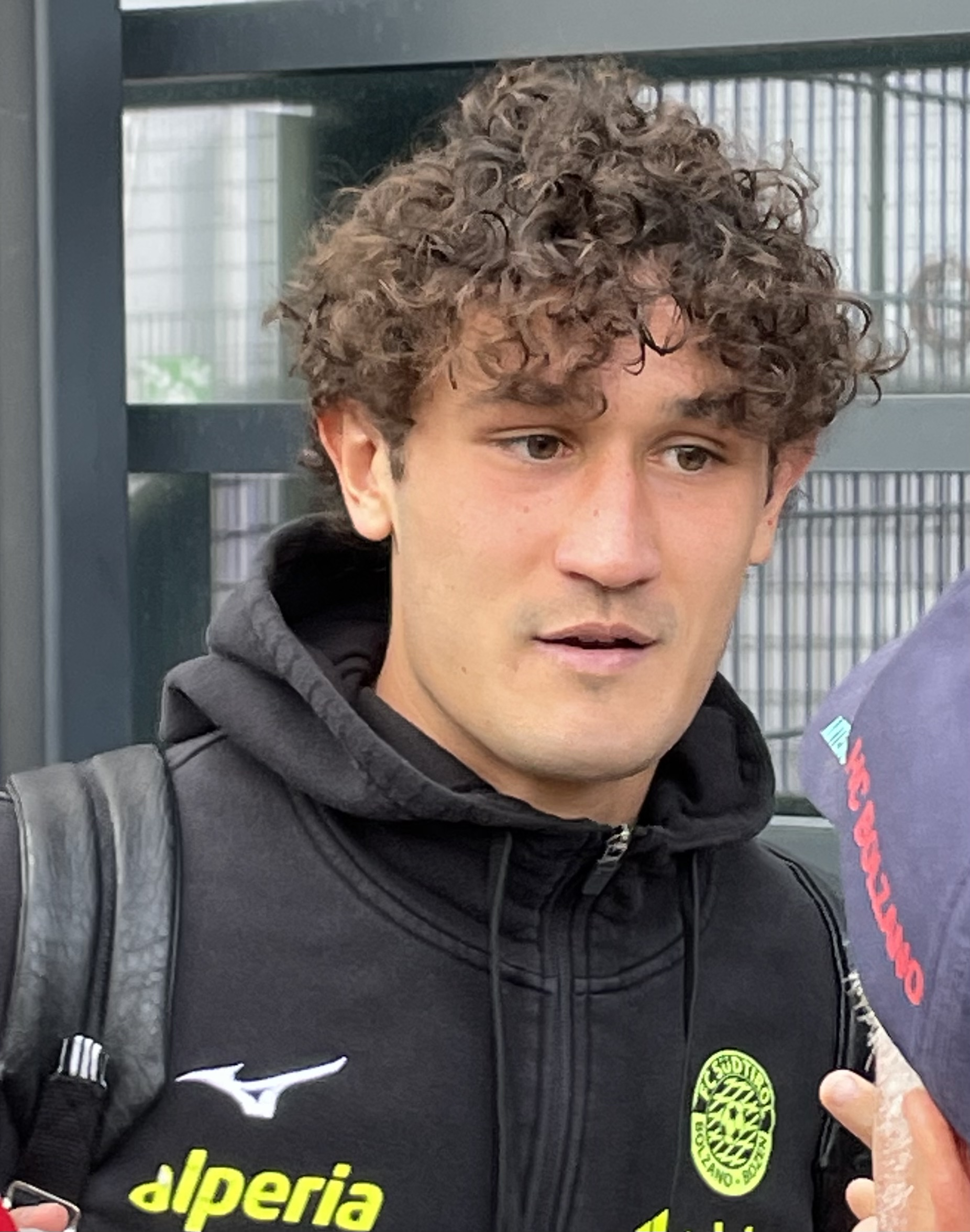
- Belardinelli with Südtirol

Personal information
- Date of birth: 14 March 2001 (age 25)
- Place of birth: Ravenna, Italy
- Height: 1.90 m (6 ft 3 in)
- Position: Defensive midfielder

Team information
- Current team: Empoli

Youth career
- –2021: Empoli

Senior career*
Years	Team	Apps	(Gls)
2019–	Empoli	7	(0)
2021–2022	→ Pro Vercelli (loan)	20	(0)
2022–2023	→ Südtirol (loan)	27	(2)
2025	→ Südtirol (loan)	12	(0)
2026	→ Reggiana (loan)	11	(0)

International career^{‡}
2018–2019	Italy U18	5	(0)
2020	Italy U19	1	(0)
- * Club domestic league appearances and goals as of 13 May 2026 ‡ National team caps and goals as of 12 February 2020

Luca Belardinelli (born 14 March 2001) is an Italian professional footballer who plays as a defensive midfielder for Serie B club Empoli.

== Club career ==
Belardinelli was raised in the youth system of Empoli and was first called up to the senior team in January 2019.

For the 2021–22 season, he was loaned to Pro Vercelli in Serie C.

On 9 July 2022, Belardinelli joined Südtirol in Serie B on loan. He made his Serie B debut for Südtirol on 14 August 2022 in a game against Brescia.

On 7 January 2025, Belardinelli returned to Südtirol on loan until the end of the season.

On 9 January 2026, he was loaned by Reggiana.

== International career ==
Belardinelli represented Italy in friendlies for the Under-18 and Under-19 squads.
