= Matteo Egan =

Irish footballer (born 2007)

Personal information
- Full name: Matteo Gerard Egan
- Date of birth: 19 November 2007 (age 18)
- Place of birth: Pisa, Italy
- Height: 1.85 m (6 ft 1 in)
- Positions: Full-back; wing-back

Team information
- Current team: Empoli
- Number: 35

Youth career
- Empoli

Senior career*
Years	Team	Apps	(Gls)
2025–	Empoli	3	(0)

International career^{‡}
2023	Republic of Ireland U16	3	(0)
2025	Republic of Ireland U19	3	(0)
2026–	Republic of Ireland U21	2	(0)
- * Club domestic league appearances and goals as of 8 September 2026 ‡ National team caps and goals as of 00:10, 18 November 2026

Matteo Egan (born 19 November 2007) is a professional footballer who plays as a wing-back for Serie B club Empoli. Born in Italy, he is a Republic of Ireland youth international.

== Club career ==
Born in Pisa, Egan grew up in San Frediano a Settimo, and is a youth product of Empoli. There, he became one of the academy best prospect in the Primavera team, as they won the Campionato and Supercoppa Primavera 2 in 2026.

On the summer 2026, he made the pre-season with Guido Pagliuca's first team, establishing himself as a standout during the summer friendlies.

Egan made his professional debut with Empoli in a 1–1 Coppa Italia Tuscan derby draw with Pisa on 17 August 2026, starting as a right wing back and playing the full game as his team exited the competition on a penalty shootout. He kept his starting jersey for the following Serie B games, proving to be a solid addition to Pagliuca's team.

== International career ==
Eligible for both Italy and the Republic of Ireland, Egan is a youth international for Ireland, having played for the under-16 and under-19. In November 2026, Egan received his first callup to the Republic of Ireland U21 team, ahead of their 2027 UEFA European Under-21 Championship qualification play-offs against Finland U21.

== Style of play ==
A right-footed defender able to play as a centre-back, Egan mainly acts as a full-back or wing-back, able to play on both sides of the field. During his professional debuts, he featured primarily on the right flank of Guido Pagliuca's 3-4-2-1 or 3–5–2.

Egan is described as an athletic player, able to repeat efforts and runs, and to contribute on the attacking front, never shying away from duels and sacrifices for the team.

== Honours ==
Empoli FC

- Campionato Primavera 2: 2025–26
