= Stefano Bianconi =

Italian footballer (born 1968)

Personal information
- Date of birth: 31 December 1968 (age 57)
- Place of birth: San Miniato, Italy
- Height: 1.88 m (6 ft 2 in)
- Position: Defender

Senior career*
Years	Team	Apps	(Gls)
1986–1988	Pontedera	10	(0)
1988–1991	Vinci	61	(2)
1991–1993	Certaldo	63	(11)
1993–1994	Sangiovannese	33	(1)
1994–2001	Empoli	200	(3)
2000	→ Cagliari (loan)	8	(0)
2001–2002	Pisa	27	(1)
2002–2003	Grosseto	21	(2)
2003–2004	Viterbese	31	(1)
2004–2005	Bari	16	(0)
2005–2006	Potenza	13	(0)
2006	Viterbese	14	(0)
2006–2007	Brindisi	15	(0)
2007–2009	Sangimignano	62	(6)
Total		574	(27)

Managerial career
- 2009–2010: Ascoli (assistant)
- 2010: Frosinone (assistant)
- 2011–2012: Empoli (assistant)
- 2013–2014: Benevento (assistant)
- 2017–2019: Empoli (coordinator)
- 2019–: Empoli (coordinator)
- * Club domestic league appearances and goals

Stefano Bianconi (born 31 December 1968) is an Italian former professional footballer who played as a defender.

== Career ==
Revealed by Pontedera, Bianconi stood out in particular for Empoli FC, a team for which he made 200 appearances and for seven seasons, two of which were in Serie A.

His identification with Empoli went beyond his playing career, as Bianconi was a technical assistant, youth assistant and club coordinator, a position he still holds today.

== Honours ==
Empoli

- Coppa Italia Serie C: 1995-96
