= Bohdan Popov =

Ukrainian footballer (born 2007)

Bohdan Popov Богдан Попов
Personal information
- Full name: Bohdan Ruslanovych Popov
- Date of birth: 4 April 2007 (age 19)
- Place of birth: Nizhyn, Ukraine
- Height: 1.93 m (6 ft 4 in)
- Position: Forward

Team information
- Current team: Empoli
- Number: 77

Youth career
- –2022: Dynamo Kyiv
- 2022–2023: Górnik Zabrze
- 2023–: Empoli

Senior career*
Years	Team	Apps	(Gls)
2024–	Empoli	26	(6)

International career^{‡}
2024	Ukraine U17	4	(0)
2025–	Ukraine U19	5	(3)
2025–	Ukraine U21	2	(0)
- * Club domestic league appearances and goals as of 11 September 2026 ‡ National team caps and goals as of 15 November 2025

Bohdan Ruslanovych Popov (Ukrainian: Богдан Русланович Попов; born 4 April 2007) is a Ukrainian professional footballer who plays as a forward for Serie B club Empoli.

== Early life ==
Popov was born on 4 April 2007 in Nizhyn, Ukraine. The son of Ruslan Popov, he has brother.

== Club career ==
As a youth player, Popov joined the academy of Ukrainian side Dynamo Kyiv. In 2022, he moved to the youth setup of Polish side Górnik Zabrze. One year later, Popov signed with Italian side Empoli and was promoted to the club's senior team in 2024. Italian news website wrote in 2024 that he "immediately won the hearts of the heads of the youth sector of Empoli, Federico Bargagna and Matteo Silvesti" while playing for them.

== International career ==
Popov is a Ukraine youth international. During the summer of 2024, he played for the Ukraine national under-17 team at the 2024 UEFA European Under-17 Championship.

== Style of play ==
Popov plays as a forward. Right-footed, he is known for his strength, speed and technical ability.
