= Giacomo Faticanti =

Italian footballer (born 2004)

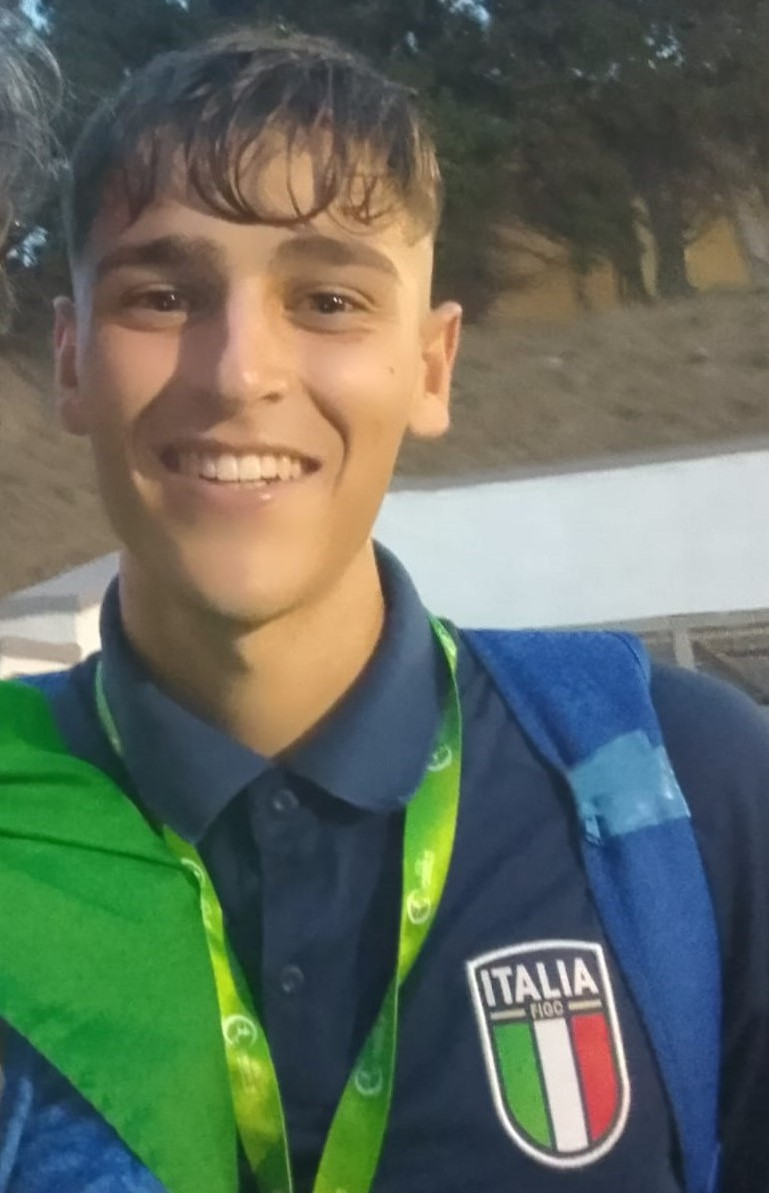
- Giacomo Faticanti with Italy under-19 in 2023

Personal information
- Full name: Giacomo Faticanti
- Date of birth: 31 July 2004 (age 22)
- Place of birth: Sora, Italy
- Height: 1.86 m (6 ft 1 in)
- Position: Midfielder

Team information
- Current team: Avellino (on loan from Juventus)
- Number: 16

Youth career
- Atletico Sora
- 2010–2018: Frosinone
- 2018–2023: Roma

Senior career*
Years	Team	Apps	(Gls)
2022–2023	Roma	0	(0)
2023–2026	Lecce	0	(0)
2024	→ Ternana (loan)	11	(0)
2024–2026	→ Juventus Next Gen (loan)	61	(2)
2026–	Juventus	0	(0)
2026–	→ Avellino (loan)	0	(0)

International career^{‡}
2019	Italy U15	4	(0)
2019–2020	Italy U16	12	(1)
2021	Italy U18	1	(0)
2021–2023	Italy U19	22	(0)
2022–2024	Italy U20	12	(1)
2024–	Italy U21	7	(0)
2026–	Italy	1	(0)
Medal record
Men's football
Representing Italy
FIFA U-20 World Cup
Runner-up	2023 Argentina
UEFA European Under-19 Championship
Winner	2023 Malta
- * Club domestic league appearances and goals as of 30 April 2026 ‡ National team caps and goals as of 16 November 2026

Giacomo Faticanti (born 31 July 2004) is an Italian professional footballer who plays as a midfielder for Serie B club Avellino, on loan from Juventus. He also plays for the Italy national team.

In 2021, Faticanti was included in The Guardian's yearly list of the 60 best talents born in 2004 in world football.

== Club career ==
=== Roma ===
Born and raised in Sora, Faticanti started playing football at local club Atletico Sora, before joining the academy of Frosinone, and then moving to Roma's youth sector in 2018.

Here, he won both the under-15 and under-17 national titles, respectively, in 2019 and 2021. Having already started featuring for the under-19 team in 2021, the midfielder became a regular starter of the squad throughout the 2021–22 season.

In the summer of 2022, Faticanti began training with the first team, under manager José Mourinho, during their pre-season. In August of the same year, he signed a contract extension with the club until 2026, before making his first bench appearances for Roma's senior team.

On 27 October 2022, Faticanti made his professional debut, coming on as a substitute for Cristian Volpato in the 78th minute of the UEFA Europa League match against HJK, which ended in a 2–1 win for his side. In April 2023, he was part of Roma's under-19 squad that won the Coppa Italia Primavera.

=== Lecce ===
On 25 August 2023, Faticanti joined Serie A side Lecce on a permanent deal, signing a five-year contract with the club. The transfer reportedly commanded a €1 million fee, plus add-ons, and a 35% sell-on clause in favor of Roma.

==== Loan to Ternana ====
On 8 January 2024, Faticanti joined Serie B side Ternana on loan until the end of the season. On 20 January, he made his first professional start in a 3–1 league win over Cittadella. He played 11 games for the club, with Ternana eventually facing relegation to Serie C after losing to Bari in the play-out.

==== Loan to Juventus Next Gen ====
On 30 August 2024, Faticanti joined Serie C side Juventus Next Gen, the reserve team of Juventus, on a season-long loan with an option to buy. On 31 July 2025, his loan-spell was extended for another year, with Juventus retaining the option to make the move permanent at the end of the 2025–26 season.

==== Loan to Avellino ====
On 1 July 2026, Juventus signed him permanently, and nine days later, on 10 July, he joined Serie B club Avellino, on a season-long loan with an option to buy.

== International career ==
Faticanti has represented Italy at various youth international levels.

Having first played for the under-15 national team, he featured regularly with the under-16 team, before going on to play for the under-18, under-19 and under-20 national teams. He also served as a captain for several of these sides.

In June 2022, he was included in the squad that took part in the 2022 UEFA European Under-19 Championship in Slovakia, where the Azzurrini reached the semi-finals before losing to eventual winners England.

In December of the same year, he was involved in a training camp led by the Italian senior national team's manager, Roberto Mancini, as part of a stage aimed to the most promising national talents.

In May 2023, he was included by head coach Carmine Nunziata in the Italian squad that took part in the FIFA U-20 World Cup in Argentina, where the Azzurrini finished runners-up after losing to Uruguay in the final match.

In June of the same year, he was included in the Italian squad for the UEFA European Under-19 Championship in Malta, where the Azzurrini eventually won their second continental title.

In May 2026, Faticanti was one of the players who were called up with the Italy national senior squad by interim head coach Silvio Baldini, for the friendly matches against Luxembourg and Greece on 3 and 7 June 2026, respectively.

With his debut against Greece, Faticanti became the first and only player in the history of the Italy senior national team to earn a cap while playing in the third division.

== Style of play ==
Faticanti is mainly a defensive midfielder, who has been regarded for his reading of the game, his aerial skills and his tackling. He can also act as a deep-lying playmaker, thanks to his ability to dictate the tempo and his wide range of passing. Moreover, his stamina, work rate and leadership skills led him to wear the captain armband of his side in various occasions.

Although he named Sergio Busquets between his sources of inspiration, the Italian player has also been compared to Daniele De Rossi, who played in his same role and similarly started his career at Roma.

In 2021, he was included in The Guardian's yearly list of the 60 best talents born in 2004 in world football.

== Career statistics ==
=== Club ===
As of match played 23 May 2024

Appearances and goals by club, season and competition
Club	Season	League			National cup		Europe		Total	
Club	Season	Division	Apps	Goals	Apps	Goals	Apps	Goals	Apps	Goals
Roma	2022–23	Serie A	0	0	0	0	1 (Note: Appearance in UEFA Europa League)	0	1	0
Lecce	2023–24	Serie A	0	0	0	0	—		0	0
Ternana (loan)	2023–24	Serie B	11	0	0	0	—		11	0
Career total			11	0	0	0	1	0	12	0

=== International ===
As of match played 7 June 2026

Appearances and goals by national team and year
National team	Year	Apps	Goals
Italy	2026	1	0
Total		1	0

== Honours ==
Roma U19

- Coppa Italia Primavera: 2022–23

Italy U20

- FIFA U-20 World Cup runner-up: 2023

Italy U19

- UEFA European Under-19 Championship: 2023
