= Gerard Yepes =

Spanish footballer (born 2002)

Personal information
- Full name: Gerard Yepes Laut
- Date of birth: 25 August 2002 (age 24)
- Place of birth: Barcelona, Spain
- Height: 1.70 m (5 ft 7 in)
- Position: Central midfielder

Team information
- Current team: Empoli
- Number: 14

Youth career
- 2008–2015: Espanyol
- 2015–2018: Sant Andreu
- 2018–2022: Sampdoria

Senior career*
Years	Team	Apps	(Gls)
2022–2025	Sampdoria	68	(0)
2025–	Empoli	32	(1)
- * Club domestic league appearances and goals as of 13 May 2026

Gerard Yepes Laut (born 25 August 2002) is a Spanish professional footballer who plays as a central midfielder for Serie B club Empoli.

== Career ==
A youth product of Espanyol and Sant Andreu, Yepes signed with the youth academy of Sampdoria in 2018. He made his professional debut with Sampdoria in a 1–1 Serie A tie with Roma on 22 December 2021.

On 8 August 2025, Yepes signed with Serie B club Empoli.

== Career statistics ==
=== Club ===
As of match played 6 April 2025

Appearances and goals by club, season and competition
Club	Season	League			National cup		Other		Total	
Club	Season	Division	Apps	Goals	Apps	Goals	Apps	Goals	Apps	Goals
Sampdoria	2021–22	Serie A	4	0	0	0	—		4	0
Sampdoria	2022–23	Serie A	5	0	3	0	—		8	0
Sampdoria	2023–24	Serie B	34	0	1	0	1 (Note: Appearances in Serie B promotion play-offs)	0	36	0
Sampdoria	2024–25	Serie B	21	0	2	1	—		23	1
Career total			64	0	6	1	1	0	71	1
