= Luca Magnino =

Italian footballer (born 1997)

Personal information
- Date of birth: 13 August 1997 (age 29)
- Place of birth: Pordenone, Italy
- Height: 1.85 m (6 ft 1 in)
- Position: Midfielder

Team information
- Current team: Empoli
- Number: 8

Youth career
- –2017: Udinese

Senior career*
Years	Team	Apps	(Gls)
2017	Udinese	0	(0)
2017	→ Casertana (loan)	12	(0)
2017–2020	Feralpisalò	83	(3)
2020–2022	Pordenone	52	(1)
2022	→ Modena (loan)	14	(1)
2022–2026	Modena	119	(6)
2026–	Empoli	15	(1)
- * Club domestic league appearances and goals as of 13 May 2026

Luca Magnino (born 13 August 1997) is an Italian professional footballer who plays as a central midfielder for Serie B club Empoli.

== Club career ==
He was raised in the youth system of Udinese. In early January 2017, he was called up to Udinese's senior team for a Serie A game, but remained on the bench. Shortly after, he was loaned to Serie C club Casertana for the rest of the 2016–17 season.

In July 2017, he moved to Serie C club Feralpisalò, where he played regularly for the next three seasons.

On 6 February 2020, his hometown club Pordenone announced that Magnino had signed a three-year contract that would become active from the following season. He made his Serie B debut for Pordenone on 26 September 2020, starting in a game against Lecce. Magnino played regularly during his first season at Pordenone, with his convincing performances eventually gaining him a contract extension until 2025.

On 24 January 2022, he joined Modena on loan with an option (and a conditional obligation) to buy.

On 2 February 2026, Magnino moved to Empoli.
