= Txus Alba =

Spanish football player (born 2003)

Personal information
- Full name: Jesús Alba Ramos
- Date of birth: 31 March 2003 (age 23)
- Place of birth: Barcelona, Spain
- Height: 1.73 m (5 ft 8 in)
- Position: Midfielder

Team information
- Current team: Lugo
- Number: 10

Youth career
- 2010–2014: Espanyol
- 2014–2016: Damm
- 2016–2018: Espanyol
- 2018–2022: Barcelona

Senior career*
Years	Team	Apps	(Gls)
2022–2023	Barcelona B	30	(1)
2023	Ternana	0	(0)
2024	Antequera	16	(2)
2024–2025	Cultural Leonesa	16	(1)
2025–	Lugo	24	(1)

International career
2019	Spain U18	3	(0)
- * Club domestic league appearances and goals as of 27 May 2026

Jesús ‘Txus’ Alba Ramos (born 31 March 2003) is a Spanish professional footballer who plays as a midfielder for CD Lugo.

== Career ==
Born in Barcelona, Catalonia, Alba started at the academy of RCD Espanyol in 2010 where he stayed for four seasons before moving on to CF Damm. He rejoined Espanyol before then moving to FC Barcelona in 2018. Barca paid their city rivals €50,000 for his services. Alba was recognised as one of the best talents in the Barcelona youth sides, even as he adjusted to a new more central midfield position than he had at Espanyol. Alba signed on to play for FC Barcelona Atlètic for the 2022–23 and 2023-24 seasons. He has continued his progress under newly appointed Barcelona Atletic manager Rafael Marquez and Alba’s regular age group partner Marc Casadó playing alongside him in central midfield.

On 18 August 2023, Alba signed with Ternana Calcio in Italian Serie B. On 16 November 2023, he left the club via mutual consent. In January 2024 he signed for Antequera CF.

On 15 July 2024, Alba signed a contract with Cultural y Deportiva Leonesa in the third tier for one season, with an option for a second. On 26 June of the following year, he moved to fellow league team CD Lugo.

== Style of play ==
Alba is gathering a reputation for his vision, passing, and ability to assist and score at dead-ball situations. He is praised for being two-footed and having good balance allowing him to dribble with the ball.

== International career ==
In 2020 made his debut appearances for the Spanish U18 football team as he played in matches against the Turkish U18 and Romanian U18 sides.

== Career statistics ==
=== Club ===
As of 18 March 2023

Appearances and goals by club, season and competition
Club	Season	League			Cup		Europe		Other		Total	
Club	Season	Division	Apps	Goals	Apps	Goals	Apps	Goals	Apps	Goals	Apps	Goals
Barcelona B	2022–23	Primera Federación	21	1	—		—		—		21	1
Barcelona B	Total		21	1	—		—		—		21	1
Career total			21	1	—		—		—		21	1
