= Joseph Ceesay =

Gambian footballer (born 1998)

Personal information
- Full name: Lars Joseph Ceesay
- Date of birth: 3 June 1998 (age 28)
- Place of birth: Stockholm, Sweden
- Height: 1.78 m (5 ft 10 in)
- Positions: Right-back; winger

Team information
- Current team: Empoli
- Number: 15

Youth career
- Hässelby SK
- 2008–2013: IF Brommapojkarna
- 2013–2016: Djurgården

Senior career*
Years	Team	Apps	(Gls)
2016–2019	Djurgården	0	(0)
2017	→ Vasalunds IF (loan)	3	(1)
2017	→ IK Frej (loan)	11	(1)
2018	→ IK Frej (loan)	9	(0)
2018	→ IK Brage (loan)	10	(2)
2019	→ Dalkurd (loan)	26	(6)
2020–2021	Helsingborgs IF	19	(0)
2021–2022	Lechia Gdańsk	33	(1)
2022–2025	Malmö FF	29	(0)
2024	→ IFK Norrköping (loan)	7	(0)
2024–2025	→ Cesena (loan)	28	(0)
2025–	Empoli	30	(3)

International career^{‡}
2016–2017	Sweden U19	3	(0)
2024–	Gambia	1	(0)
- * Club domestic league appearances and goals as of 13 May 2026 ‡ National team caps and goals as of 4 September 2024

Lars Joseph Ceesay (born 3 June 1998) is a professional footballer who plays as a midfielder for Serie B club Empoli. Born in Sweden, he represents Gambia at international level.

== Club career ==
Ceesay began to play football in Hässelby SK. In 2008 he moved to IF Brommapojkarna, well known for their youth academy. In the summer of 2013, Ceesay moved to another club in the Stockholm region, Djurgården. In November 2016 he signed his first A-team deal with Djurgården; a 3.5-year contract. During spring 2017, he was loaned out to Vasalunds IF and scored a goal in May 2017 against Enskede IK.

In July 2017, Ceesay was loaned out to IK Frej for the rest of the 2017 season. In December, the loan was extended until the end of 2018. He was called back to Djurgården in July 2018, only to be sent on loan to IK Brage a month later. In January 2019 he was again loaned, this time to Dalkurd, for the 2019 season.

On 29 November 2019, he signed with Helsingborgs IF on a two-year deal.

On 11 July 2022, Ceesay signed with Malmö FF.

On 23 March 2024, it was decided that Ceesay would join IFK Norrköping on loan until the summer transfer window. He returned to Malmö FF after declining a loan extension, despite interest from both clubs for him to remain.

On 24 July 2024, Serie B newcomers Cesena announced that Ceesay had joined on loan with an option to buy.

On 16 July 2025, Ceesay joined recently Serie B demoted club Empoli permanently.

== International career ==
Born in Sweden, Ceesay is of Gambian descent. On 5 October 2020, he was called up to the Sweden U21 national team training camp in Olympia, Helsingborg. He did not appear in scheduled UEFA Euro U-21 qualifying games against Luxembourg and Armenia.

Ceesay made his debut for the Gambia national team on 4 September 2024 in an Africa Cup of Nations qualifier against Comoros at the Ben M'Hamed El Abdi Stadium, Morocco. He played the full game as it ended in a 1–1 draw.

== Personal life ==
His younger brother Jesper Ceesay plays for IFK Norrköping.

== Honours ==
Malmö FF

- Allsvenskan: 2023
