= Gabriele Boloca =

Romanian footballer (born 2001)

Personal information
- Date of birth: 31 March 2001 (age 25)
- Place of birth: Chieri, Italy
- Height: 1.92 m (6 ft 4 in)
- Position: Centre-back

Team information
- Current team: AlbinoLeffe
- Number: 6

Youth career
- 2009–2021: Juventus
- 2019–2020: → Bologna (loan)
- 2020–2021: → Monza (loan)

Senior career*
| Years | Team | Apps | (Gls) |
| 2021–2022 | Juventus U23 | 1 | (0) |
| 2022 | Seregno | 2 | (0) |
| 2023 | Chieri | 10 | (0) |
| 2023–2024 | Albenga | 13 | (0) |
| 2024 | Ternana | 7 | (0) |
| 2024– | AlbinoLeffe | 33 | (0) |

International career
| 2017 | Romania U16 | 2 | (0) |
| 2017–2018 | Romania U17 | 5 | (0) |
| 2019 | Romania U19 | 2 | (0) |
- * Club domestic league appearances and goals as of 6 September 2026

Gabriele Boloca (born 31 March 2001) is a professional footballer who plays as a centre-back for Serie C Group A club AlbinoLeffe. Born in Italy to Romanian parents, he represented Romania at youth international level.

== Club career ==
A youth product of Juventus, Boloca was first called-up by Juventus U23 – the reserve team of Juventus – on 10 February 2019, for a match against Arzachena. Boloca was eventually called-up six times at the end of the season, without debuting. Boloca was sent on loan to the under-19 teams of Bologna and Monza, in the 2019–20 and 2020–21 seasons respectively.

On 25 January 2020, Boloca was called up by Siniša Mihajlović to Bologna's senior squad, for their game against SPAL; he was an unused substitute. In January 2021, Juventus announced Boloca's loan to Monza had been interrupted prematurely.

After being benched 21 times during the season, Boloca made his professional debut for Juventus U23 on 24 April 2022, as a starter in a Serie C game against Legnago Salus, helping his side win 3–2.

In 2022, he joined Serie D club Seregno. After spending the first half of the 2023–24 season with fellow Serie D club Albenga, Boloca was signed by Serie B club Ternana in January 2024.

On 30 August 2024, Boloca moved to AlbinoLeffe in Serie C.

== International career ==
In 2018, Boloca was called up to represent the Romania national under-17 team.

== Personal life ==
He is the younger brother of Daniel Boloca who also plays as a central midfielder for Serie A club Sassuolo.

== Style of play ==
Boloca is a defender who mainly plays as a centre-back, and can also play as a left-back on occasion.
