= Mattia Bortolussi =

Italian footballer

Personal information
- Date of birth: 2 May 1996 (age 30)
- Place of birth: Ancona, Italy
- Height: 1.88 m (6 ft 2 in)
- Position: Forward

Team information
- Current team: Padova
- Number: 20

Youth career
- Gubbio

Senior career*
Years	Team	Apps	(Gls)
2014–2016	Gubbio	11	(1)
2014–2015	→ Catania (loan)	0	(0)
2016–2017	Sansepolcro	31	(11)
2017–2019	Lucchese	65	(10)
2019–2020	Novara	26	(10)
2020–2022	Cesena	74	(26)
2022–2023	Novara	23	(5)
2023–	Padova	121	(39)
- * Club domestic league appearances and goals as of 13 May 2026

Mattia Bortolussi (born 2 May 1996) is an Italian professional footballer who plays as a forward for Serie B club Padova.

== Club career ==
Born in Ancona, Bortolussi started his career in Serie D club Gubbio.

In 2019, he joined Serie C club Novara. He spent one season in the club, and played 26 league matches.

On 22 September 2020, he signed with Cesena.

On 19 July 2022, Bortolussi returned to Novara and signed a three-year contract.

On 26 January 2023, Bortolussi moved to Padova on a 2.5-year deal.
