= Empoli FC Youth Sector =

Italian football club

Empoli Youth Sector
- Full name: Empoli F.C. Youth Sector
- Nickname: Azzurri (The Blues)
- Ground: Centro Sportivo Monteboro – Empoli, Italy
- Head coach: Andrea Filippeschi
- League: Campionato Primavera 1
- 2020–21: 1st, champions
- Website: empolicalcio.net
Home colours	Away colours	Third colours

Empoli F.C. Youth Sector (Italian: Settore Giovanile) comprises the under-19 team and the academy of Italian professional football club Empoli F.C. The under-19 squad competes in Campionato Primavera 1, and won the championship in 1998–99 and 2020-21.

== Primavera ==
=== Current squad ===
As of 23 August 2026

Note: Flags indicate national team as defined under FIFA eligibility rules; some limited exceptions apply. Players may hold more than one non-FIFA nationality.

No.	Pos.	Nation	Player
—	GK	ITA	Mbengue Serigne Fallou
—	GK	ITA	Edoardo Giusti
—	GK	POL	Mateusz Lesiewicz
—	GK	ITA	Riccardo Vettore
—	DF	ITA	Diego Antonini
—	DF	GER	Samsondeen Babalola
—	DF	POL	Dawid Bembnista
—	DF	ITA	Roberto Berizzi
—	DF	ITA	Cristian Covelli
—	DF	ITA	Emanuele De Vita
—	DF	IRL	Matteo Egan
—	DF	ITA	Davide Ginestretti
—	DF	ITA	Nicolò Pauliuc
—	DF	ITA	Tommaso Rugani
—	DF	ITA	Marco Silvestri
—	DF	HAI	Wensly Valme
—	MF	ITA	Gianmarco Angiolini
—	MF	ALB	Oliver Blini

No.	Pos.	Nation	Player
—	MF	ITA	Fabio Bruno
—	MF	ITA	Francesco De Witt
—	MF	FRA	Aboubacar Fade
—	MF	ALB	Mattia Huqi
—	MF	ITA	Tommaso Lupoli
—	MF	ITA	Nicola Mazzi
—	MF	ITA	Michele Mureddu
—	MF	ITA	Alan Orlandi
—	MF	ITA	Andrea Orlandi
—	MF	ITA	Ernesto Perin
—	MF	ITA	Diego Pisani
—	MF	ITA	Matteo Sousa Campos
—	FW	ESP	David Ferrer
—	FW	ITA	Alessandro Isidori
—	FW	SLO	Florijan Meznar (on loan from NK Radomlje)
—	FW	ITA	Salvatore Monaco
—	FW	ITA	Vincenzo Murolo
—	FW	ITA	Giulio Pucci

== Non-playing staff (under-19 squad) ==
- Head Coach: Alessandro Birindelli
- Assistant Coach Luca Fiasconi
- Fitness Coaches: Francesco Carchedi / Matteo D'Elia
- Goalkeeping Coach: Matteo Fantozzi
- Team Doctor: Cavalli Eligio
- Physiotherapist: Francesco Fondelli

== Honours ==
- Campionato Nazionale Primavera
  - Champions (1): 1998–99
- Campionato Primavera 1
  - Champions (1): 2020-21
