= Empoli FC =

Association football club in Italy

Empoli
- Full name: Empoli Football Club S.p.A.
- Nickname: Azzurri Empolesi (Empoli Blues)
- Founded: 1920; 106 years ago
- Stadium: Stadio Carlo Castellani – Computer Gross Arena
- Capacity: 16,800
- Owner: Fabrizio Corsi
- President: Fabrizio Corsi
- Head coach: Matteo Andreoletti
- League: Serie B
- 2025–26: Serie B, 15th of 20
- Website: empolifc.it//
Home colours	Away colours	Third colours

Empoli Football Club is an Italian professional football club based in Empoli, Tuscany. Founded in 1920, the side is part of a select group of Italian football clubs not based in a provincial capital city that have participated in Serie A.

Empoli has spent most of its history in professional football. Empoli competed in European competitions once, in which they were eliminated in the qualification stage of 2007–08 UEFA Cup.

== History ==
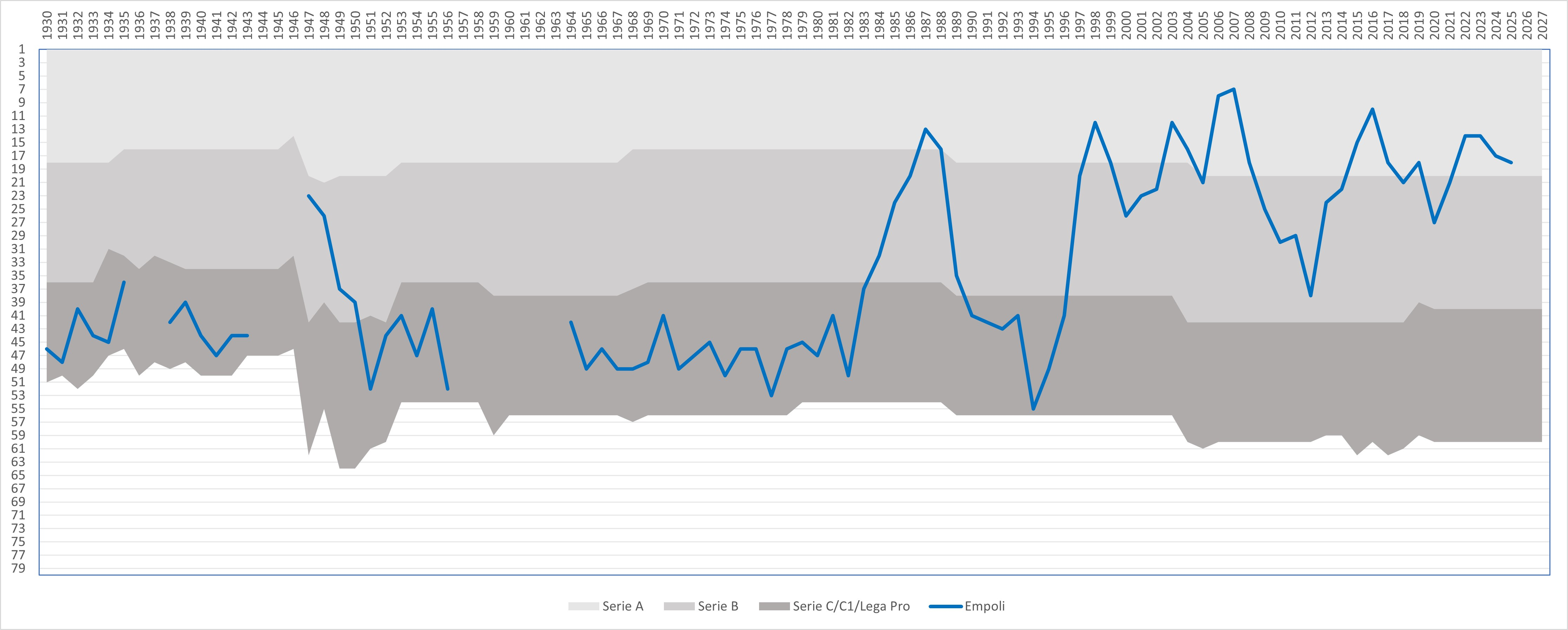
The performance of Empoli in the Italian football league structure since the first season of a unified Serie A (1929/30)

=== From the 1920s to the 1970s ===
In August 1920 in Empoli, Foot Ball Club Empoli and the football section Unione Sportiva Empoli were born. After the participation of a tournament in San Miniato, the two merged into a single local football club. The next season, the new club, after having obtained in September affiliation in the Italian Football Federation (FIGC) ratified by the Tuscan Regional Committee, was included in Group A of the Tuscan Promozione 1921–22, but did take part due to economic problems, choosing instead to join the league of Terza Categoria, where the team achieved second place in the group A.

In the 1922–23 season, Empoli finished in second place in Group A of the Terza Categoria, gaining admission to the final round after winning the play-off in Florence, held on 15 April 1923 against Pontedera, 1–0. The season concluded with a third place in the group final.

From 1923 to 1926, Empoli continued to play in the Tuscan third division. Then, in the 1926–27 season, Empoli won the Group A division of Tuscany, and was admitted to the interregional finals; thanks to a fourth place in Group G, the Tuscans were promoted in the North Division of the Second Division 1927–28, the third Italian football tier of the era. In the following season the team was then inserted in Group C of the North Division, which concluded in fourth place, but for economic reasons refused the invitation to take part in the next championship of Prima Divisione, and therefore followed the downgrading of the Seconda Divisione from third to fourth tier. However, already the following season, in the 1928–29 Seconda Divisione, the club won promotion, winning the Tuscan championship, and returned to the North Division of Prima Divisione.

Empoli was in the Prima Divisione, then Serie C, until the 1935–36 season, when the team withdrawn halfway through the season because of the call to arms for many of its players. Empoli resumed competitive activity from Prima Divisione the next season, under the name of OND Empoli, with the colours gray and blue; the team won the Tuscan Group A again gaining admission in Serie C. Until the shutdown from the causes of war, Empoli played in Serie C, obtaining a best result of sixth place in 1938–39. Meanwhile, the club was renamed OND Interaziendale Italo Gambaccioni Section Soccer from 1938 to 1941, until the name was changed again to Associazione Calcio Empol. On 15 September 1935, Empoli debuted in the Coppa Italia with a 1–0 home success against Pontedera.

After World War II, Empoli took up the club name of Empoli Foot Ball Club after being called Sports Group Azelio Landi for a brief period between October and November 1944, and was admitted into Serie B thanks to a third-place finish in the 1945–46 season. In Serie B, Empoli played for four consecutive seasons, finishing in third place in the 1946–47 season. Relegation of the club – which by then had adopted the colour blue – occurred at the end of 1949–50 championship. The permanence in Serie C lasted for six seasons: in the summer of 1955, the club sold most of its players and at the end of the 1955–56 season, the Tuscan side were relegated to Serie D. After three seasons in the fourth division, in 1959–60 the Azzurri risked relegation to the regional level after finishing in 15th place, on equal points with Carrarese and Rieti. The club managed to escape relegation before drawing with Carrarese and then surpassing Lazio, in Pesaro, with a goal from Vezzosi. In 1960–61, Empoli returned to the third tier of Italian football, but for only one season, again suffering relegation.

The club returned to Serie C on 9 June 1963 after beating Tempio 2–0 in the play-off in Genoa. The club's permanence in the third tier of Italian football, then called Serie C1, lasted for 20 years until the 1982–83 season.

=== The 1980s and 1990s ===
In 1986, the small-town club was promoted to Serie A. Playing their first few home games in Florence, Empoli's Serie A debut resulted in a 1–0 win over Internazionale. Helped by a nine-point deduction from Udinese, they avoided relegation with 23 points and 13 goals in 30 games. Empoli themselves received a five-point penalty the following season, and were relegated despite an improved showing. They were relegated again to Serie C1 in 1989.

This club then spent several seasons in Serie C1 before returning to Serie B in 1996 and achieving a second successive promotion in 1997. With Luciano Spalletti at the helm, Empoli defied the odds to finish in 12th place and avoid relegation. Relegation the following year began a three-year stay in Serie B, in which time the club became renowned for nurturing its own outstanding young talent.

Promotions to Serie A in 2002 and 2005 have seen the club emerge as battlers against relegation. They ended the 2005–06 season in tenth place in the top-flight. As a result of the Serie A match-fixing scandal at the end of that season, they gained qualification for the UEFA Cup for the following season, but did not participate as club management failed to apply for a UEFA licence. In the 2006–07 season, the club once again qualified for the UEFA Cup.

=== The years 2000 and participation in the UEFA Cup ===
With the prospect of European football approaching, the management strengthened the squad, most notably signing a number of young players from large Serie A clubs, such as Rincón of Inter, Ignazio Abate and Lino Marzoratti of Milan and Sebastian Giovinco, Claudio Marchisio and Rej Volpato of Juventus on loan or co-ownership deals. Empoli marked their debut in the UEFA Cup with a two-legged match against Zürich, losing 4–2 on aggregate. A poor showing in the initial part of the season then led chairman Fabrizio Corsi to sack Luigi Cagni, who led the Tuscans to UEFA Cup qualification, and replace him with Alberto Malesani. However, the club's fortunes did not change and Malesani was sacked after a 2–0 defeat to Sampdoria which left them at the bottom of the table. Cagni was re-appointed on 31 March 2008 but the team suffered a last-minute relegation. Cagni resigned and was replaced by Silvio Baldini ahead of the 2008–09 season. Baldini's tenure, however, did not prove to be successful, as the Tuscans ended the season only in fifth place, and were later defeated in the promotion playoffs by Brescia.

=== Between Serie B and Serie A ===
Despite modest results, Baldini was sacked. By December 2011, the club had gone through four coaches since the 2009–10 season. The club maintained their Serie B status dramatically in 2011–12. After a poor season, Empoli finished 18th, one point from safety, which meant a relegation play-off against Vicenza over two legs. The first game finished goalless before Vicenza led 2–0 in the second leg with 30 minutes to go. However, two goals in two minutes saw the Azzuri level the tie before Massimo Maccarone secured a 3–2 victory in the fourth minute of injury time. 2012–13 saw the club finish fourth, a dramatic improvement on the previous season, but lost the promotion play-off final to Livorno over two legs. The club secured promotion back to Serie A the following season, finishing as runners-up to Palermo and stayed in the top flight for two seasons, finishing 15th in 2014–15 and 10th in 2015–16. Going into the final matchday of the 2016–17 Serie A season, Empoli were one point above the relegation zone ahead of Crotone, however were eventually relegated to Serie B after they failed to beat Palermo, while Crotone beat Lazio. After a triumph of the 2017–18 Serie B, Empoli promptly regained promotion to Serie A, after winning Serie B on 28 April 2018, four matches in advance. On the final matchday of the 2018–19 Serie A season, Empoli were one point above the relegation zone ahead of Genoa, however were eventually relegated to Serie B after they were defeated by Internazionale; while Genoa drew with Fiorentina, both sides finished on the same number of points, but Genoa had a greater goal difference by one. However, Empoli finished first in the 2020–21 Serie B season, their third title in the competition in their history, and so returned to Serie A after two seasons. In the 2023–24 season, Empoli secured their continued presence in Serie A, following a stoppage time goal in a 2–1 victory against Roma on the final matchday.

== Players ==
=== Current squad ===
As of 10 September 2026

Note: Flags indicate national team as defined under FIFA eligibility rules; some limited exceptions apply. Players may hold more than one non-FIFA nationality.

No.	Pos.	Nation	Player
1	GK	ITA	Samuele Perisan
5	MF	ITA	Duccio Degli Innocenti
6	DF	ITA	Simone Romagnoli
8	MF	ITA	Luca Magnino
10	FW	ITA	Edoardo Saporiti
11	FW	ALB	Stiven Shpendi
12	GK	ITA	Jacopo Seghetti
13	GK	ITA	Emiliano Filippis
15	MF	GAM	Joseph Ceesay
17	FW	ITA	Salvatore Monaco
20	FW	ITA	Filippo Distefano
21	MF	ESP	Gerard Yepes
23	MF	ITA	Filippo Bandinelli

No.	Pos.	Nation	Player
25	DF	ITA	Marco Curto
28	DF	ITA	Gabriele Indragoli
33	DF	ITA	Cristian Cauz
35	MF	IRL	Matteo Egan
39	MF	ITA	Edoardo Biondini
40	DF	ITA	Roberto Berizzi
44	MF	ITA	Lapo Deli (on loan from Fiorentina)
45	MF	ITA	Andrea Orlandi
57	MF	ITA	Luca Belardinelli
77	FW	UKR	Bohdan Popov
91	DF	ITA	Niccolò Corrado (on loan from Frosinone)
98	MF	ALG	Karim Zedadka (on loan from Südtirol)

=== Out on loan ===
Note: Flags indicate national team as defined under FIFA eligibility rules; some limited exceptions apply. Players may hold more than one non-FIFA nationality.

No.	Pos.	Nation	Player
—	GK	ITA	Filippo Vertua (at Ostiamare until 30 June 2027)
—	DF	ITA	Samuele Tavanti (at Pistoiese until 30 June 2027)
—	DF	ITA	Lorenzo Tosto (at Inter U23 until 30 June 2027)

No.	Pos.	Nation	Player
—	MF	ITA	Francesco Fabri (at Grosseto until 30 June 2027)
—	FW	ITA	Thomas Campaniello (at Fiorentina Primavera until 30 June 2027)
—	FW	ITA	Alessio Spatari (at Tau Calcio Altopascio until 30 June 2027)

== Coaching staff ==
As of 4 July 2025

Position	Name
Head coach	(Italy) Guido Pagliuca
Assistant coach	(Italy) Nazzareno Tarantino
Technical collaborator	(Italy) Simone Angeli (Italy) Stefano Bianconi
Goalkeeper coach	(Italy) Leonardo Baldini
Match analyst	(Italy) Riccardo Carbone (Italy) Giampiero Pavone
Fitness coach	(Italy) Rocco Perrotta (Italy) Eduardo Pizzarelli
Performance data analyst and Head of the youth sector performance area	(Italy) Andrea Vieri
Rehab coach	(Italy) Diego Chiesi
Head of medical staff	(Italy) Giuseppe Anania
Club doctor	(Italy) Luca Gatteschi
Physiotherapist	(Italy) Mirco Baldini (Italy) Francesco Brandinelli (Italy) Francesco Marino
Kit manager	(Italy) Luca Batini (Italy) Sauro Spera

== Notable former players ==
Players with international caps, appearances in Olympic Games or 100 league appearances with Empoli

- (Albania) Etrit Berisha
- (Albania) Ardian Ismajli
- (Albania) Stiven Shpendi
- (Albania) Kristjan Asllani
- (Albania) Elseid Hysaj
- (Albania) Nedim Bajrami
- (Albania) Frédéric Veseli
- (Australia) Mark Bresciano
- (Australia) Vince Grella
- (Brazil) Emílson Cribari
- (Chile) Jorge Vargas
- (Croatia) Igor Budan
- (Italy) Ignazio Abate
- (Italy) Daniele Adani
- (Italy) Stefano Bianconi
- (Italy) Marco Borriello
- (Italy) Raoul Bortoletto
- (Italy) Luca Bucci
- (Italy) Antonio Buscè
- (Italy) Andrea Coda
- (Italy) Dario Dainelli (youth)
- (Italy) Antonio Di Natale
- (Italy) Éder
- (Italy) Sebastian Giovinco
- (Italy) Massimo Maccarone
- (Italy) Claudio Marchisio
- (Italy) Vincenzo Montella
- (Italy) Alessandro Pane
- (Italy) Andrea Raggi
- (Italy) Tommaso Rocchi
- (Italy) Luca Saudati
- (Italy) Luciano Spalletti
- (Italy) Francesco Tavano
- (Italy) Luca Toni
- (Italy) Ighli Vannucchi
- (Poland) Piotr Zieliński
- (Slovakia) Samuel Mráz
- (Slovenia) Zlatko Dedić
- (Sweden) Johnny Ekström
- (Uruguay) Marcelo Zalayeta
- See also: Category:Empoli FC players

== List of coaches ==
Below is a list of Empoli coaches from 1920 until the present day.

- (Italy) Antonio Vojak (1937–39)
- (Italy) Enrico Colombari (1939–40)
- (Italy) Sergio Cervato (1968–70)
- (Italy) Sergio Castelletti (1971–72)
- (Italy) Renzo Ulivieri (1972–76)
- (Italy) Bruno Giorgi (1976–77)
- (Italy) Vincenzo Guerini (1983–85)
- (Italy) Luigi Simoni (1988–89)
- (Italy) Vincenzo Montefusco (1989–91)
- (Italy) Francesco Guidolin (1991–92)
- (Italy) Adriano Lombardi (1993–94)
- (Italy) Luciano Spalletti (1995–98)
- (Italy) Luigi Delneri (1998)
- (Italy) Mauro Sandreani (1998–99)
- (Italy) Corrado Orrico (1998–99)
- (Italy) Elio Gustinetti (1999–2000)
- (Italy) Silvio Baldini (2000–03)
- (Italy) Mario Somma (2004–06)
- (Italy) Luigi Cagni (2006–07)
- (Italy) Alberto Malesani (2007–08)
- (Italy) Luigi Cagni (2008)
- (Italy) Silvio Baldini (2008–09)
- (Italy) Salvatore Campilongo (2009–10)
- (Italy) Alfredo Aglietti (2010–11)
- (Italy) Giuseppe Pillon (2011)
- (Italy) Guido Carboni (2011–12)
- (Italy) Alfredo Aglietti (2012)
- (Italy) Maurizio Sarri (2012–15)
- (Italy) Marco Giampaolo (2015–16)
- (Italy) Giovanni Martusciello (2016–17)
- (Italy) Vincenzo Vivarini (2017)
- (Italy) Aurelio Andreazzoli (2017–18)
- (Italy) Giuseppe Iachini (2018–19)
- (Italy) Aurelio Andreazzoli (2019)
- (Italy) Cristian Bucchi (2019)
- (Italy) Roberto Muzzi (2019–20)
- (Italy) Alessio Dionisi (2020–21)
- (Italy) Aurelio Andreazzoli (2021–22)
- (Italy) Paolo Zanetti (2022–23)
- (Italy) Aurelio Andreazzoli (2023–24)
- (Italy) Davide Nicola (2024)
- (Italy) Roberto D'Aversa (2024–present)

== Continental appearances ==
=== UEFA Cup ===
Season	Round	Club	Home	Away	Aggregate
2007–08	First round	(Switzerland) Zürich	2–1	0–3	2–4

== Honours ==
- Serie B
  - Winners: 2004–05, 2017–18, 2020–21
- Serie C1
  - Winners: 1928–29, 1982–83
- Coppa Italia Serie C
  - Winners: 1995–96

== Divisional movements ==
Series	Years	Last	Promotions	Relegations
A	17	2024–25	-	▼7 (1988, 1999, 2004, 2008, 2017, 2019, 2025)
B	22	2020–21	▲7 (1986, 1997, 2002, 2005, 2014, 2018, 2021)	▼2 (1950, 1989)
C	47	1995–96	▲3 (1946, 1983, 1996)	▼3 (1936, 1957, 1962)
83 out of 90 years of professional football in Italy since 1929
D	7	1962–63	▲3 (1937, 1961, 1963)	Never
