= 2025–26 AC Monza season =

AC Monza
2025–26 season
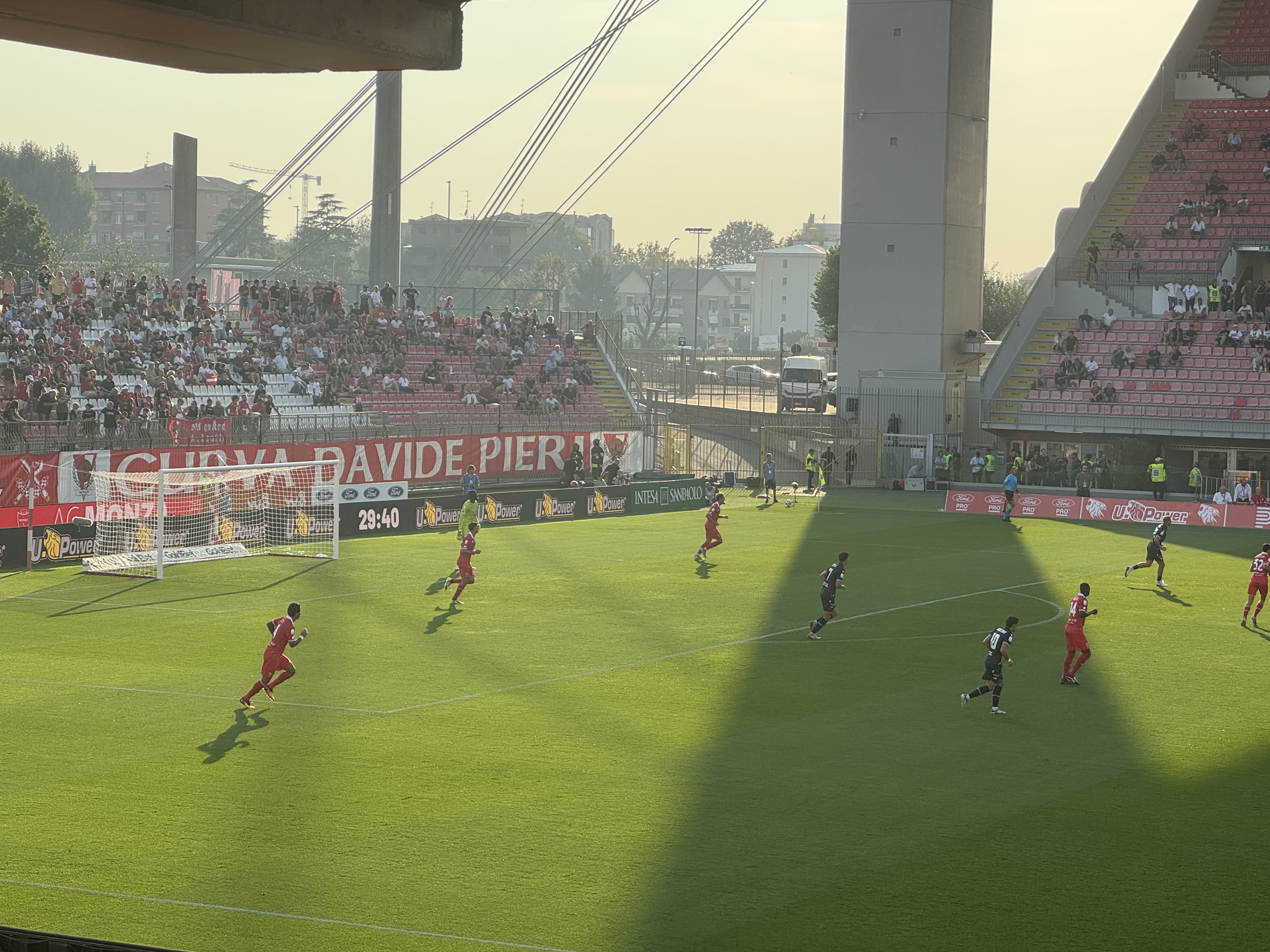
- Monza vs. Sampdoria, 20 September 2025
- Owner: Beckett Layne Ventures (80%), Fininvest (20%)
- President: Paolo Berlusconi (until 29 September); Lauren Crampsie (from 29 September)
- Manager: Paolo Bianco
- Stadium: Stadio Brianteo
- Serie B: 3rd (promoted via play-offs)
- Serie B promotion play-offs: Winners
- Coppa Italia: First round
- Top goalscorer: League: Andrea Petagna (9); All: Andrea Petagna (9)
- Highest home attendance: 11,776 vs Palermo; 14 March 2026 (Serie B); 17,015 vs Catanzaro; 29 May 2029 (Serie B Play-off)
- Lowest home attendance: 2,797 vs Frosinone; 17 August 2025 (Coppa Italia)
- Average home league attendance: 7,393
Home colours	Away colours	Third colours

The 2025–26 season was the 114th season in the history of the AC Monza, the 41st season in Serie B after the third consecutive season in Serie A. After defeating Catanzaro in the play-off final, Monza were promoted to the Serie A for the fourth time in their history. They also participated in the Coppa Italia, the Italian domestic cup, and were eliminated in the round of 32.

== Squad ==
Note: Flags indicate national team as defined under FIFA eligibility rules; some limited exceptions apply. Players may hold more than one non-FIFA nationality.

No.	Pos.	Nation	Player
1	GK	ITA	Semuel Pizzignacco
2	DF	SWE	Arvid Brorsson
3	DF	ITA	Lorenzo Lucchesi (on loan from Fiorentina)
4	DF	ITA	Armando Izzo
6	DF	BUL	Valentin Antov
7	MF	BRA	Paulo Azzi
9	FW	CRO	Mirko Marić
10	FW	ITA	Gianluca Caprari
11	FW	ENG	Omari Forson
13	DF	ITA	Luca Ravanelli
14	MF	EQG	Pedro Obiang
15	DF	ITA	Filippo Delli Carri
16	MF	ITA	Jacopo Sardo
17	FW	SEN	Keita Baldé
18	MF	ITA	Kevin Zeroli (on loan from AC Milan)

No.	Pos.	Nation	Player
19	DF	ITA	Samuele Birindelli
20	GK	SEN	Demba Thiam
21	MF	ITA	Leonardo Colombo
23	MF	ITA	Nicolas Galazzi
24	DF	ITA	Adam Bakoune
25	FW	URU	Agustín Álvarez (on loan from Sassuolo)
26	FW	ITA	Patrick Ciurria
27	DF	ITA	Samuele Capolupo
28	MF	ITA	Andrea Colpani
32	MF	ITA	Matteo Pessina (captain)
33	DF	ITA	Saverio Domanico
37	FW	ITA	Andrea Petagna
43	GK	SVN	Aljaž Strajnar
44	DF	ITA	Andrea Carboni
47	FW	POR	Dany Mota

== Friendlies ==
=== Pre-season ===
19 July 2025 Friendly	Monza (Italy)	4–1	(Switzerland) Collina d'Oro	Monza
CEST 18:00 UTC+2	Colpani 13'; Sardo 20'; Petagna 71' (pen.); Marić 84'	Report	Josipovic 27'	Stadium: Centro sportivo Silvio e Luigi Berlusconi - Monzello

24 July 2025 Friendly	Monza (Italy)	1–0	(Italy) Giana Erminio	Monza
CEST 17:30 UTC+2	Keita Balde 54'	Report		Stadium: Centro sportivo Silvio e Luigi Berlusconi - Monzello

29 July 2025 Friendly	Monza (Italy)	2–0	(Italy) Alcione	Monza
CEST 17:30 UTC+2	Marić 5'; Pessina 36' (pen.)	Report		Stadium: Stadio Brianteo

30 July 2025 Friendly	Monza (Italy)	2–0	(Italy) AlbinoLeffe	Monza
CEST 17:30 UTC+2	Domanico 11'; Ballabio 79'	Report		Stadium: Centro sportivo Silvio e Luigi Berlusconi - Monzello

6 August 2025 Friendly	Atalanta (Italy)	2–1	(Italy) Monza	Zingonia
CEST 17:00 UTC+2	Birindelli 14'	Report	Scalvini 69'; De Ketelaere 89'	Stadium: Centro sportivo Bortolotti

12 August 2025 Friendly	Monza (Italy)	2–2 (3–5 p)	(Italy) Inter Milan	Monza
CEST 21:00 UTC+2	Ciurria 32'; Azzi 89'	Report	Birindelli 45+1' (o.g.); Esposito 52'	Stadium: Stadio Brianteo; Referee: Kevin Bonacina
	Penalties
	Obiang (penalty scored); Galazzi (penalty scored); Ganvoula (penalty scored); Sardo (penalty missed)		(penalty scored) L. Martínez; (penalty scored) Bastoni; (penalty scored) Barella; (penalty scored) Acerbi; (penalty scored) Thuram

== Competitions ==
=== Overall record ===
Competition	First match	Last match	Starting round	Final position	Record							
Competition	First match	Last match	Starting round	Final position	Pld	W	D	L	GF	GA	GD	Win %
Serie B	23 August 2025	9 May 2026	Matchday 1	3	38	22	10	6	61	32	+29	57.89
Coppa Italia	17 August 2025	17 August 2025	First round	Round of 32	1	0	0	1	0	1	−1	0.00
Total					39	22	10	7	61	33	+28	56.41

Source: Monza Schedule

=== Serie B ===
==== League table ====
Pos	Team	Pld	W	D	L	GF	GA	GD	Pts	Promotion, qualification or relegation
1	Venezia (C, P)	38	24	10	4	77	31	+46	82	Promotion to Serie A
2	Frosinone (P)	38	23	12	3	76	34	+42	81	Promotion to Serie A
3	Monza (O, P)	38	22	10	6	61	32	+29	76	Qualification for promotion play-offs semi-finals
4	Palermo	38	20	12	6	61	33	+28	72	Qualification for promotion play-offs semi-finals
5	Catanzaro	38	15	14	9	62	51	+11	59	Qualification for promotion play-offs preliminary round

Source: Serie BKT
Rules for classification: 1) Points; 2) Head-to-head points; 3) Head-to-head goal difference; 4) Goal difference; 5) Goals scored; 6) Draw.
(Note: Head-to-head record is used only after all the matches between the teams in question have been played)
(C) Champions; (O) Play-off winners; (P) Promoted

==== Results summary ====
Overall								Home						Away					
Pld	W	D	L	GF	GA	GD	Pts	W	D	L	GF	GA	GD	W	D	L	GF	GA	GD
38	22	10	6	61	32	+29	76	14	4	1	30	11	+19	8	6	5	31	21	+10

Source: Worldfootball

==== Results by round ====
Round	1	2	3	4	5	6	7	8	9	10	11	12	13	14	15	16	17	18	19	20	21	22	23	24	25	26	27	28	29	30	31	32	33	34	35	36	37	38
Ground	H	A	A	H	H	A	H	A	H	A	H	A	H	A	H	A	H	A	A	H	H	A	H	A	H	A	H	A	A	H	A	H	A	H	A	H	A	H
Result	W	D	L	W	L	D	W	W	W	W	W	W	W	D	D	L	W	W	L	D	W	W	W	D	W	W	W	W	L	W	D	D	D	W	W	W	L	D
Position	8	6	11	5	9	9	7	5	2	2	2	1	1	1	1	2	2	2	3	3	3	3	2	3	3	2	2	2	2	2	2	2	3	2	2	2	3	3

Updated to match(es) played on 31 August 2025. Source: Worldfootball
A = Away; H = Home; W = Win; D = Draw; L = Loss

==== Matches ====
The match schedule was released in August 2025.

23 August 2025 1	Monza	1–0	Mantova	Monza
20:00 CEST (UTC+2)	Ciurria (yellow card) 11'; Birindelli (yellow card) 32'; Izzo 57'; Baldé (yellow card) 90'	Report	Radaelli (yellow card) 47'; Mensah (yellow card) 70'; Trimboli (yellow card) 81'	Stadium: Stadio Brianteo; Attendance: 5,291; Referee: Andrea Colombo

31 August 2025 2	Bari	1–1	Monza	Bari
20:00 CEST (UTC+2)	Moncini 16'; Partipilo (yellow card) 33'; Kassama (yellow card) 82'		Mota 2'; Ravanelli (yellow card) 4'; Obiang (yellow card) 19'; Caprari (yellow card) 27'; Carri (yellow card) 88'	Stadium: Stadio San Nicola; Attendance: 15,010; Referee: Simone Galipò

12 September 2025 3	Avellino	2–1	Monza	Avellino
19:30 CEST (UTC+2)	Šimić (yellow card) 22', (goal) 33'; Fontanarosa (yellow card) 59'; Russo 86'		Álvarez 90+2'	Stadium: Stadio Partenio; Attendance: 11,000; Referee: Ivano Pezzuto

20 September 2025 4	Monza	1–0	Sampdoria	Monza
16:15 CEST (UTC+2)	Izzo (yellow card) 4'; Ciurria (red card) 55'; Álvarez 59'		Vulikić (yellow card) 7'; Cherubini (red card) 31'; Henderson (yellow card) 54'	Stadium: Stadio Brianteo; Attendance: 7,688; Referee: Rosario Abisso

27 September 2025 5	Monza	0–1	Padova	Monza
16:15 CEST	Birindelli (yellow card) 52'		Perrotta (yellow card) 49'; Varas 51'; Crisetig (yellow card) 66'	Stadium: Stadio Brianteo; Attendance: 5,402; Referee: Alberto Ruben Arena

1 October 2025 6	Empoli	1–1	Monza	Empoli
19:30 CEST	Belardinelli (yellow card) 57'; Elia (yellow card) 62'; Guarino 79'		Colombo (yellow card) 14'; Carboni 49'; Obiang (yellow card) 66'	Stadium: Stadio Carlo Castellani; Attendance: 6,014; Referee: Giuseppe Mucera

4 October 2025 7	Monza	2–1	Catanzaro	Monza
14:00 CEST	Zeroli (yellow card) 19'; Birindelli (yellow card) 34', (goal) 66'; Álvarez 37'		Cissè 5', (yellow card) 34'	Stadium: Stadio Brianteo; Attendance: 7,559; Referee: Mario Perri

18 October 2025 8	Frosinone	0–1	Monza	Frosinone
14:00 CEST	Koutsoupias (yellow card) 34'		Baldé (yellow card) 24', (goal) 39'; Ravanelli (yellow card) 73'; Zeroli (yellow card) 84'	Stadium: Stadio Benito Stirpe; Attendance: 10,163; Referee: Antonio Rapuano

25 October 2025 9	Monza	3–1	Reggiana	Monza
14:00 CEST	Mota 3', 43'; Izzo 25', (yellow card) 26'; Baldé (yellow card) 29'		Novakovich 13'; Lambourde (yellow card) 16'; Marras (yellow card) 21'; Papetti (yellow card) 76'	Stadium: Stadio Brianteo; Attendance: 5,513; Referee: Francesco Fourneau

28 October 2025 10	Palermo	0–3	Monza	Palermo
20:30 CET	Brunori (yellow card) 74'		Baldé (yellow card) 30'; Mota 39'; Izzo 50', (yellow card) 74'; Birindelli (yellow card) 82'; Ravanelli (yellow card) 90+4'; Azzi 90+5'	Stadium: Stadio Renzo Barbera; Attendance: 26,679; Referee: Juan Luca Sacchi

2 November 2025 11	Monza	1–0	Spezia	Monza
16:15 CET	Ciurria (yellow card) 18'; Ravanelli 53'; Izzo (yellow card) 75' (red card) 85'		Lapadula (yellow card) 53'; Fellipe Jack (yellow card) 79'	Stadium: Stadio Brianteo; Attendance: 4,962; Referee: Federico La Penna

9 November 2025 12	Pescara	0–2	Monza	Pescara
17:15 CET	Corbo (yellow card) 11'		Baldé (yellow card) 16', (goal) 27'; Colpani 47'	Stadium: Stadio Adriatico; Attendance: 7,205; Referee: Luca Pairetto

23 November 2025 13	Monza	1–0	Cesena	Monza
17:15 CET	Obiang 37'; Colombo (yellow card) 76'			Stadium: Stadio Brianteo; Attendance: 7,777; Referee: Giuseppe Mucera

30 November 2025 14	Juve Stabia	2–2	Monza	Castellammare di Stabia
15:00 CET	Stabile (yellow card) 18'; Candellone 31'; Gabrielloni (yellow card) 71'; Maistro 83'		Birindelli 19', (yellow card) 49'; Ciurria (yellow card) 26'; Ravanelli (yellow card) 28'; Izzo (yellow card) 64'; Petagna 68'; Thiam (yellow card) 71'	Stadium: Stadio Romeo Menti; Attendance: 3,986; Referee: Claudio Giuseppe Allegretta

8 December 2025 15	Monza	1–1	Südtirol	Monza
15:00 CET	Marić 32'; Carboni (yellow card) 90+2'		Martini (yellow card) 11'; Odogwu 76', (yellow card) 87'	Stadium: Stadio Brianteo; Attendance: 5,291; Referee: Giovanni Ayroldi

13 December 2025 16	Venezia	2–0	Monza	Venice
15:00 CET	Pérez (yellow card) 38', (goal) 49'; Adorante 56' (pen.)		Colombo (yellow card) 10'; Azzi (yellow card) 14'; Petagna (yellow card) 90+1'	Stadium: Stadio Pier Luigi Penzo; Attendance: 8,866; Referee: Simone Galipò

20 December 2025 17	Monza	4–1	Carrarese	Monza
15:00 CET	Birindelli 9', 55'; Carri 44'; Petagna 84'		Parlanti (yellow card) 13'; Zanon (yellow card) 40'; Illanes (yellow card) 42'; Schiavi (yellow card) 45+3'; Distefano 74'	Stadium: Stadio Brianteo; Attendance: 6,908; Referee: Daniele Perenzoni

26 December 2025 18	Modena	1–2	Monza	Modena
17:15 CET	Adorni (yellow card) 26'; Gliozzi 40' (pen.); Zampano (yellow card) 44'; Tonoili (yellow card) 90+1'; Beyuku (yellow card) 90+5'		Baldé (yellow card) 18'; Izzo (yellow card) 39'; Pessina (yellow card) 44'; Azzi 50'; Ravanelli 65'; Ciurria (yellow card) 87'	Stadium: Stadio Alberto Braglia; Attendance: 11,316; Referee: Kevin Bonacina

10 January 2026 19	Virtus Entella	1–0	Monza	Chiavari
15:00 CET	Franzoni 84' (pen.); Alborghetti (yellow card) 90+1'		Baldé (yellow card) 27'; Colombo (yellow card) 41'; Carri (yellow card) 58'; Lucchesi (yellow card) 90'	Stadium: Stadio Enrico Sannazzari; Attendance: 2,485; Referee: Mario Perri

17 January 2026 20	Monza	2–2	Frosinone	Monza
15:00 CET	Hernani 23', (yellow card) 39'; Petagna 73'; Baldé (yellow card) 83'; Pessina (yellow card) 90+2'		Ghedjemis 4'; Bracaglia (yellow card) 12'; Kone (yellow card) 67' (red card) 76'; Calò (yellow card) 74'; Monterisi 88'	Stadium: Stadio Brianteo; Attendance: 5,460; Referee: Antonio Rapuano

24 January 2026 21	Monza	3–0	Pescara	Monza
15:00 CET	Baldé (yellow card) 2'; Hernani 34', 49'; Lucchesi (yellow card) 45'; Obiang (yellow card) 48'; Colombo (yellow card) 75'; Marić (yellow card) 76'; Azzi 78'		Letizia (yellow card) 28'; Gravillon (yellow card) 83'	Stadium: Stadio Brianteo; Attendance: 4,713; Referee: Ivano Pezzuto

1 February 2026 22	Padova	1–2	Monza	Padua
17:15 CET	Bortolussi 17' (pen.); Perrotta (yellow card) 24'; Faedo (yellow card) 39'; Sgarbi (yellow card) 74'		Brorsson (yellow card) 15'; Colpani 45'; Álvarez 87'	Stadium: Stadio Euganeo; Attendance: 7,134; Referee: Mattia Massimi

8 February 2026 23	Monza	2–1	Avellino	Monza
15:00 CET	Cutrone 78'; Pessina 86' (pen.)		Enrici (yellow card) 34'; Biasci 52'; Le Borgne (yellow card) 79'; Missori (yellow card) 90+5'	Stadium: Stadio Brianteo; Attendance: 8,042; Referee: Livio Marinelli

11 February 2026 24	Südtirol	0–0	Monza	Bolzano
19:00 CET	Tronchin (yellow card) 48'; Veseli (yellow card) 90+5'		Colombo (yellow card) 42'	Stadium: Stadio Druso; Attendance: 3,401; Referee: Giuseppe Mucera

15 February 2026 25	Monza	2–1	Juve Stabia	Monza
15:00 CET	Hernani 51'; Petagna 64'		Mosti 2'	Stadium: Stadio Brianteo; Attendance: 5,322; Referee: Niccolò Turrini

21 February 2026 26	Carrarese	0–1	Monza	Carrara
19:30 CET	Belloni (yellow card) 90+5'		Carri (yellow card) 43'; Hernani 49'	Stadium: Stadio dei Marmi; Attendance: 3,988; Referee: Rosario Abisso

27 February 2026 27	Monza	2–0	Virtus Entella	Monza
19:00 CET	Azzi 63'; Pessina (yellow card) 76', (goal) 90+1'; Thiam (yellow card) 85'			Stadium: Stadio Brianteo; Attendance: 5,584; Referee: Claudio Giuseppe Allegretta

3 March 2026 28	Cesena	1–3	Monza	Cesena
20:00 CET	Frabotta (yellow card) 20', (goal) 90+3'; Ciofi (yellow card) 33'		Azzi 25', (yellow card) 57' (red card) 70'; Cutrone 33'; Petagna 78'; Ravanelli (yellow card) 88'	Stadium: Stadio Dino Manuzzi; Attendance: 10,055; Referee: Kevin Bonacina

7 March 2026 29	Spezia	4–2	Monza	La Spezia
15:00 CET	Artistico 20', 90+3', (yellow card) 63'; Aurelio 34', (yellow card) 38'; Sernicola (yellow card) 45+1'; Bandinelli 57'		Petagna 9'; Carboni (yellow card) 10' (red card) 32'; Cutrone 16'; Lucchesi (yellow card) 72'	Stadium: Stadio Alberto Picco; Attendance: 8,473; Referee: Fabio Maresca

14 March 2026 30	Monza	3–0	Palermo	Monza
17:15 CET	Petagna 18'; Hernani (yellow card) 41'; Ciurria 63'; Ravanelli (yellow card) 75'; Colombo 88'		Palumbo (yellow card) 28'; Ceccaroni (yellow card) 62'; Modesto (yellow card) 77'; Ranocchia (yellow card) 80'	Stadium: Stadio Brianteo; Attendance: 11,776; Referee: Daniele Doveri

17 March 2026 31	Reggiana	0–0	Monza	Reggio Emilia
20:00 CET	Reinhart (yellow card) 58'			Stadium: Mapei Stadium; Attendance: 8,026; Referee: Giuseppe Mucera

21 March 2026 32	Monza	1–1	Venezia	Monza
17:15 CET	Pessina 51' (pen.); Cutrone (yellow card) 73'		Haps 26'	Stadium: Stadio Brianteo; Attendance: 8,819; Referee: Marco Guida

6 April 2026 33	Catanzaro	1–1	Monza	Catanzaro
14:00 CEST	Pontisso 6'; D'Alessandro (yellow card) 15'; Pittarello (yellow card) 32'; Alesi (red card) 36'; Brighenti (yellow card) 69'; Cassandro (yellow card) 76'		Cutrone (yellow card) 8' (red card) 48'; Lucchesi (yellow card) 45'; Baldé (red card) 76'; Pessina 90+6' (pen.)	Stadium: Stadio Nicola Ceravolo; Attendance: 8,588; Referee: Giovanni Ayroldi

11 April 2026 34	Monza	2–0	Bari	Monza
18:30 CEST	Obiang 50'; Petagna (yellow card) 70'; Pessina 79'		Maggiore (yellow card) 64'; Dorval (yellow card) 90+4'	Stadium: Stadio Brianteo; Attendance: 7,242; Referee: Federico La Penna

17 April 2026 35	Sampdoria	0–3	Monza	Genoa
19:30 CEST	Pierini (yellow card) 52'		Cutrone 5'; Caso 13'; Lucchesi (yellow card) 15'; Petagna 85', (yellow card) 86'	Stadium: Stadio Luigi Ferraris; Attendance: 28,171; Referee: Gianluca Manganiello

24 April 2026 36	Monza	1–0	Modena	Monza
18:00 CEST	Birindelli 27'; Bakoune (yellow card) 90'		Tonoli (yellow card) 45+2'; Nieling (yellow card) 85'	Stadium: Stadio Brianteo; Attendance: 8,039; Referee: Federico Dionisi

1 May 2026 37	Mantova	3–2	Monza	Mantua
14:00 CEST	Dembélé (yellow card) 11'; Kouda 23'; Mancuso 35'; Cella (yellow card) 59'; Paoletti (yellow card) 88'; Benaïssa 90+5'		Petagna (yellow card) 28'; Hernani (yellow card) 57'; Lucchesi 78'; Mota 88'	Stadium: Stadio Danilo Martelli; Attendance: 10,941; Referee: Juan Luca Sacchi

8 May 2026 38	Monza	2–2	Empoli	Monza
19:30 CEST	Pessina (yellow card) 4'; Petagna 29'; Carri 65'; Birindelli (yellow card) 67'		Shpendi 1', 90+1'; Guarino (yellow card) 18'; Romagnoli (yellow card) 74'; Lovato (yellow card) 76'	Stadium: Stadio Brianteo; Attendance: 10,653; Referee: Matteo Mercenaro

== Serie B promotion play-offs ==
=== Matches ===
Results list Monza's goal tally first.

Date	Round	Opponent	Venue	Result	Scorers	Attendance	Referee
16 May 2026	Semi-final	Juve Stabia	Away	2–2	Carboni 77', Carri 89'	7,062	Giovanni Ayroldi
19 May 2026	Semi-final	Juve Stabia	Home	2–1	Cutrone 84', 90+5'	10,785	Maurizio Mariani

Results list Monza's goal tally first.

Date	Round	Opponent	Venue	Result	Scorers	Attendance	Referee
24 May 2026	Final	Catanzaro	Away	2–0	Hernani 77', Caso 88'	12,705	Matteo Marchetti
29 May 2026	Final	Catanzaro	Home	0–2		17,015	Davide Massa

=== Coppa Italia ===
17 August 2025 First round	Monza	0–1	Frosinone	Monza
18:00 CEST (UTC+2)				Stadium: Stadio Brianteo; Attendance: 2,797
