= 2024–25 AC Monza season =

AC Monza
2024–25 season
- Owner: Fininvest (Berlusconi family)
- President: Paolo Berlusconi
- Manager: Alessandro Nesta (until 23 December); Salvatore Bocchetti (from 24 December to 10 February); Alessandro Nesta (from 10 February)
- Stadium: Stadio Brianteo
- Serie A: 20th (relegated)
- Coppa Italia: Round of 16
- Top goalscorer: League: Dany Mota; Milan Đurić (4 each); All: Dany Mota; Milan Đurić (4 each)
- Highest home attendance: 15,479 vs Juventus; 22 December 2024 (Serie A)
- Lowest home attendance: 3,782 vs Brescia; 26 September 2024 (Coppa Italia)
- Average home league attendance: 11,370
- Biggest win: 0–3 vs Hellas Verona (A); 21 October 2024 (Serie A)
- Biggest defeat: 5–1 vs Lazio (A); 9 February 2025 (Serie A); 4–0 vs Bologna (A); 3 December 2024 (Coppa Italia); 4–0 vs Roma (A); 24 February 2025 (Serie A)
Home colours	Away colours	Third colours

The 2024–25 season was the 113th season in the history of the AC Monza, and the third consecutive season in Serie A. In addition to the domestic league, the team participated in the Coppa Italia.

Monza's relegation to Serie B was sealed after a heavy 0–4 loss to Atalanta. This disappointing campaign stood in sharp contrast to their 2022–23 performance, when the team earned 52 points. In this season, Monza collected just 18 points—among the lowest totals recorded in a 20-team league format since its adoption in 2004—coming close to, but narrowly avoiding, the all-time low of 17 points registered by Chievo in the 2018–19 season.

== Squad ==
Note: Flags indicate national team as defined under FIFA eligibility rules; some limited exceptions apply. Players may hold more than one non-FIFA nationality.

No.	Pos.	Nation	Player
2	DF	SWE	Arvid Brorsson
3	DF	SRB	Stefan Leković (on loan from Red Star Belgrade)
4	DF	ITA	Armando Izzo
5	DF	ITA	Luca Caldirola
6	MF	ITA	Roberto Gagliardini
7	MF	CIV	Jean-Daniel Akpa Akpro (on loan from Lazio)
8	MF	POL	Kacper Urbański (on loan from Bologna)
10	FW	ITA	Gianluca Caprari
11	MF	ITA	Gaetano Castrovilli (on loan from Lazio)
12	MF	ITA	Stefano Sensi
13	DF	POR	Pedro Pereira
18	MF	ITA	Kevin Zeroli (on loan from AC Milan)
19	DF	ITA	Samuele Birindelli
20	FW	ENG	Omari Forson
21	GK	ITA	Semuel Pizzignacco

No.	Pos.	Nation	Player
22	DF	ARG	Tomás Palacios (on loan from Inter Milan)
30	GK	ITA	Stefano Turati (on loan from Sassuolo)
32	MF	ITA	Matteo Pessina (captain)
33	DF	ITA	Danilo D'Ambrosio
35	FW	CGO	Silvère Ganvoula
37	FW	ITA	Andrea Petagna
42	MF	ITA	Alessandro Bianco (on loan from Fiorentina)
44	DF	ITA	Andrea Carboni
47	FW	POR	Dany Mota
55	FW	ITA	Kevin Martins
57	MF	ITA	Leonardo Colombo
69	GK	ITA	Andrea Mazza
77	DF	GRE	Giorgos Kyriakopoulos
80	FW	ITA	Samuele Vignato
84	FW	ITA	Patrick Ciurria

== Transfers ==
=== Summer window ===
==== In ====
Date	Pos.	Player	From	Fee	Notes	Ref.
30 June 2024	GK	(Italy) Alessio Cragno	(Italy) Sassuolo	Loan return		
30 June 2024	FW	(Italy) Davide Diaw	(Italy) Bari	Loan return		
30 June 2024	FW	(Croatia) Mirko Marić	(Croatia) Rijeka	Loan return		
30 June 2024	FW	(Italy) Andrea Petagna	(Italy) Cagliari	Loan return		
30 June 2024	MF	(Italy) Mattia Valoti	(Italy) Pisa	Loan return		
1 July 2024	DF	(Greece) Giorgos Kyriakopoulos	(Italy) Sassuolo	€3,000,000	Loan transfer made permanent	
1 July 2024	MF	(England) Omari Forson	(England) Manchester United	Free		
31 July 2024	MF	(Italy) Daniel Maldini	(Italy) Milan	€5,000,000	Loan transfer made permanent	
8 August 2024	MF	(Italy) Stefano Sensi	(Italy) Inter Milan	Free		

==== Loans in ====
Date	Pos.	Player	From	Fee	Notes	Ref.
5 August 2024	GK	(Italy) Semuel Pizzignacco	(Italy) Feralpisalò	Free	Obligation to buy for an undisclosed fee under certain conditions	
23 August 2024	GK	(Italy) Stefano Turati	(Italy) Sassuolo	Free	Option to buy for €15,000,000	
30 August 2024	MF	(Italy) Alessandro Bianco	(Italy) Fiorentina	Free		

=== Out ===
Date	Pos.	Player	To	Fee	Notes	Ref.
30 June 2024	MF	(Ivory Coast) Jean-Daniel Akpa Akpro	(Italy) Lazio	Loan return		
30 June 2024	MF	(Argentina) Valentín Carboni	(Italy) Inter Milan	Loan return		
30 June 2024	FW	(Italy) Lorenzo Colombo	(Italy) Milan	Loan return		
30 June 2024	GK	(Italy) Stefano Gori	(Italy) Juventus	Loan return		
30 June 2024	MF	(Italy) Daniel Maldini	(Italy) Milan	Loan return		
30 June 2024	MF	(Italy) Alessio Zerbin	(Italy) Napoli	Loan return		
1 July 2024	DF	(Italy) Giulio Donati	Unattached	End of contract		
1 July 2024	MF	(Argentina) Papu Gómez	Unattached	End of contract		
1 July 2024	MF	(Brazil) Carlos Augusto	(Italy) Inter Milan	€13,250,000	Loan made permanent	
1 July 2024	MF	(Serbia) Matija Popović	(Italy) Napoli	Free	To Primavera squad	
8 July 2024	MF	(Italy) Armando Anastasio	(Italy) Catania	Free		
12 July 2024	FW	(Italy) Leonardo Mancuso	(Italy) Mantova	Undisclosed		
30 August 2024	DF	(Italy) Davide Bettella	(Italy) Frosinone	Undisclosed		
30 August 2024	MF	(Italy) Marco D'Alessandro	(Italy) Catanzaro	Undisclosed		

==== Loans out ====
Date	Pos.	Player	To	Fee	Notes	Ref.
5 July 2024	GK	(Italy) Michele Di Gregorio	(Italy) Juventus	€4,500,000	Obligation to buy for €13,500,000	
13 July 2024	DF	(Bulgaria) Valentin Antov	(Italy) Cremonese	Free		
26 July 2024	MF	(Italy) Andrea Colpani	(Italy) Fiorentina	€4,000,000	Obligation to buy for €12,000,000	
26 August 2024	GK	(Italy) Alessandro Sorrentino	(Italy) Frosinone	Free		
26 August 2024	MF	(Equatorial Guinea) José Machín	(Italy) Frosinone	Free		

=== Winter window ===
==== In ====
Date	Pos.	Player	From	Fee	Notes	Ref.
28 January 2025	MF	(Equatorial Guinea) José Machín	(Italy) Frosinone	Loan return		
29 January 2025	DF	(Sweden) Arvid Brorsson	(Sweden) Mjällby	€500,000		
2 February 2025	FW	(Republic of the Congo) Silvère Ganvoula	(Switzerland) Young Boys	€1,800,000		
3 February 2025	GK	(Italy) Semuel Pizzignacco	(Italy) Feralpisalò	Undisclosed	Loan transfer made permanent	
13 February 2025	FW	(Senegal) Keita Baldé	Unattached	Free		

==== Loans in ====
Date	Pos.	Player	From	Fee	Notes	Ref.
2 January 2025	MF	(Ivory Coast) Jean-Daniel Akpa Akpro	(Italy) Lazio	Free		
17 January 2025	DF	(Serbia) Stefan Leković	(Serbia) Red Star Belgrade	Free	Obligation to buy for an undisclosed fee under conditions	
25 January 2025	MF	(Poland) Kacper Urbanski	(Italy) Bologna	Free		
29 January 2025	DF	(Argentina) Tomás Palacios	(Italy) Inter Milan	Free		
31 January 2025	MF	(Italy) Gaetano Castrovilli	(Italy) Lazio	Free		
3 February 2025	MF	(Italy) Kevin Zeroli	(Italy) Milan	Free		

==== Out ====
Date	Pos.	Player	To	Fee	Notes	Ref.
22 January 2025	FW	(Bosnia and Herzegovina) Milan Đurić	(Italy) Parma	€1,500,000		
28 January 2025	DF	(Spain) Pablo Marí	(Italy) Fiorentina	€1,800,000		
1 February 2025	FW	(Italy) Daniel Maldini	(Italy) Atalanta	€10,000,000		
3 February 2025	MF	(France) Warren Bondo	(Italy) Milan	€10,000,000		
3 February 2025	GK	(Italy) Alessio Cragno	(Italy) Sampdoria	Undisclosed		
3 February 2025	FW	(Italy) Davide Diaw	(Italy) Cittadella	Undisclosed		
3 February 2025	MF	(Italy) Mattia Valoti	(Italy) Cremonese	Undisclosed		

==== Loans out ====
Date	Pos.	Player	To	Fee	Notes	Ref.
29 January 2025	MF	(Equatorial Guinea) José Machín	(Spain) Cartagena	Free		
3 February 2025	FW	(Croatia) Mirko Marić	(Italy) Venezia	Free		

== Friendlies ==
=== Pre-season ===
14 July 2024 Friendly	Monza Bianco (Italy)	1–1	(Italy) Monza Rosso	Temù
17:00 UTC+2	Petagna	Report	Đurić	Stadium: Campo Sportivo di Temù

17 July 2024 Friendly	Monza (Italy)	16–1	(Italy) Nuova Camunia	Temù
17:00 UTC+2	Mota 9', 16'; Petagna 12', 30'; Carboni 22', 28'; Đurić 48'; Demurtas 51' (o.g.); Valoti 55'; Caprari 62'; Pereira 66'; Kyriakopoulos 75', 84', 87'; Forson 78'; Postiglione 89'	Report	Bresesti 61'	Stadium: Campo Sportivo di Temù

20 July 2024 Friendly	Monza (Italy)	0–1	(Italy) Palermo	Temù
16:30 UTC+2		Report	Di Francesco 8'	Stadium: Stadio Comunale

21 July 2024 Friendly	Monza (Italy)	v	(Italy) Real Vicenza	Temù
17:00 UTC+2				Stadium: Stadio Comunale
Note: Cancelled

24 July 2024 Friendly	Monza (Italy)	2–0	(Italy) Alcione	Temù
16:30 UTC+2	Caprari 28', 30'			Stadium: Stadio Comunale

29 July 2024 Friendly	Monza (Italy)	3–1	(Italy) Vis Pesaro	Monza
17:30 UTC+2	Mota 12'; Đurić 17', 48'	Report	Molina 82' (pen.)	Stadium: Centro sportivo Silvio e Luigi Berlusconi - Monzello

3 August 2024 Friendly	Monza (Italy)	2–2	(Italy) Sassuolo	Monza
17:00 UTC+2	Pablo Marí 10'; Marić 67'	Report	Lauriente 6'; Bajrami 39'	Stadium: Centro sportivo Silvio e Luigi Berlusconi - Monzello

24 July 2024 Friendly	Monza (Italy)	2–0	(Italy) Alcione	Temù
16:30 UTC+2	Caprari 28', 30'			Stadium: Stadio Comunale

13 August 2024 Trofeo Silvio Berlusconi	AC Milan (Italy)	3–1	(Italy) Monza	Milan
21:00 UTC+2	Saelemaekers 11'; Jović 47'; Reijnders 56'	Report	Maldini 34'	Stadium: Stadio San Siro; Attendance: 54,089; Referee: Antonio Giua

== Competitions ==
=== Overall record ===
Competition	First match	Last match	Starting round	Final position	Record							
Competition	First match	Last match	Starting round	Final position	Pld	W	D	L	GF	GA	GD	Win %
Serie A	17 August 2024	24 May 2025	Matchday 1	20th	38	3	9	26	28	69	−41	7.89
Coppa Italia	9 August 2024	3 December 2024	First round	Round of 16	3	1	1	1	3	5	−2	33.33
Total					41	4	10	27	31	74	−43	9.76

Source: Monza Schedule

=== Serie A ===
==== League table ====
Pos	Team	Pld	W	D	L	GF	GA	GD	Pts	Qualification or relegation
16	Parma	38	7	15	16	44	58	−14	36 (Note: Cagliari finished ahead of Parma on head-to-head points: Parma 2–3 Cagliari, Cagliari 2–1 Parma.)	
17	Lecce	38	8	10	20	27	58	−31	34	
18	Empoli (R)	38	6	13	19	33	59	−26	31	Relegation to Serie B
19	Venezia (R)	38	5	14	19	32	56	−24	29	Relegation to Serie B
20	Monza (R)	38	3	9	26	28	69	−41	18	Relegation to Serie B

Source: Serie A
Rules for classification: 1) Points; 2) Tiebreaker for Champions team and third relegated team; 3) Head-to-head points; 4) Head-to-head goal difference; 5) Goal difference; 6) Goals scored; 7) Draw.
(Note: Head-to-head record is used only after all the matches between the teams in question have been played)
(R) Relegated

==== Results summary ====
Overall								Home						Away					
Pld	W	D	L	GF	GA	GD	Pts	W	D	L	GF	GA	GD	W	D	L	GF	GA	GD
38	3	9	26	28	69	−41	18	1	5	13	13	31	−18	2	4	13	15	38	−23

Source: Worldfootball

==== Results by round ====
Round	1	2	3	4	5	6	7	8	9	10	11	12	13	14	15	16	17	18	19	20	21	22	23	24	25	26	27	28	29	30	31	32	33	34	35	36	37	38
Ground	A	H	A	H	H	A	H	A	H	A	H	H	A	A	H	A	H	A	H	H	A	A	H	A	H	A	H	A	H	A	H	A	H	A	H	A	H	A
Result	D	L	D	D	L	L	D	W	D	L	L	L	D	D	L	L	L	L	L	W	L	L	L	L	D	L	L	L	D	L	L	L	L	L	L	W	L	L
Position	13	16	15	15	19	20	19	16	16	17	18	19	19	19	19	19	20	20	20	20	20	20	20	20	20	20	20	20	20	20	20	20	20	20	20	20	20	20

Updated to match(es) played on 24 May 2025. Source: Worldfootball
A = Away; H = Home; W = Win; D = Draw; L = Loss

==== Matches ====
The match schedule was released on 4 July 2024.

17 August 2024 1	Empoli	0–0	Monza	Empoli
20:45 CEST (UTC+2)	Fazzini (yellow card) 67'	Report	(yellow card) 48' Maldini	Stadium: Stadio Carlo Castellani; Attendance: 7,746; Referee: Michael Fabbri

24 August 2024 2	Monza	0–1	Genoa	Monza
20:45 CEST (UTC+2)	Izzo (yellow card) 39'; Marí (yellow card) 90+6'	Report	45+7' Pinamonti; (yellow card) 59' De Winter; (yellow card) 90+1' Thorsby; (yellow card) 90+3' Malinovskiy	Stadium: Stadio Brianteo; Attendance: 10,394; Referee: Maurizio Mariani

1 September 2024 3	Fiorentina	2–2	Monza	Florence
18:30 CEST (UTC+2)	Mandragora (yellow card) 23'; Kean 45'; Dodô (yellow card) 90+5'; Gosens 90+6'	Report	18' Đurić; (yellow card) 20' Pessina; 32' Maldini; (yellow card) 75' Izzo; (yellow card) 80' Petagna; (yellow card) 90+7' Gagliardini	Stadium: Stadio Artemio Franchi; Attendance: 18,376; Referee: Andrea Colombo

15 September 2024 4	Monza	1–1	Internazionale	Monza
20:45 CEST (UTC+2)	Mota 81', (yellow card) 85'	Report	(yellow card) 62', (goal) 88' Dumfries; (yellow card) 90+5' Pavard	Stadium: Stadio Brianteo; Attendance: 14,541; Referee: Luca Pairetto

22 September 2024 5	Monza	1–2	Bologna	Monza
15:00 CEST (UTC+2)	Đurić 43'	Report	24' Urbanski; 80' Castro	Stadium: Stadio Brianteo; Attendance: 9,991; Referee: Davide Massa

29 September 2024 6	Napoli	2–0	Monza	Naples
20:45 CEST (UTC+2)	Politano 22'; Kvaratskhelia (yellow card) 26', (goal) 33'	Report	(yellow card) 24' Maldini; (yellow card) 36' Izzo	Stadium: Stadio Diego Armando Maradona; Attendance: 50,500; Referee: Gianluca Manganiello

6 October 2024 7	Monza	1–1	Roma	Monza
18:00 CEST (UTC+2)	Kyriakopoulos (yellow card) 60'; Mota 70'; Đurić (yellow card) 90+1'; D'Ambrosio (yellow card) 90+3'	Report	(yellow card) 26' Soulé; 61' Dovbyk	Stadium: Stadio Brianteo; Attendance: 12,021; Referee: Federico La Penna

21 October 2024 8	Verona	0–3	Monza	Verona
20:45 CEST (UTC+2)	Tchatchoua (yellow card) 35'; Ghilardi (yellow card) 44'; Duda (yellow card) 53'	Report	9', 74' Mota; (yellow card) 41' Carboni; (yellow card) 72' Caprari; 79' Bianco	Stadium: Stadio Marcantonio Bentegodi; Attendance: 24,854; Referee: Federico Dionisi

27 October 2024 9	Monza	2–2	Venezia	Monza
15:00 CET (UTC+1)	Kyriakopoulos 23'; Đurić 44'; Mota (yellow card) 50'; Bondo (yellow card) 76' (yellow-red card); Đurić (yellow card) 90+4'	Report	15' Ellertsson; 39' Svoboda; (yellow card) 51' Busio; (yellow card) 76' Zampano	Stadium: Stadio Brianteo; Attendance: 10,141; Referee: Antonio Rapuano

30 October 2024 10	Atalanta	2–0	Monza	Bergamo
20:45 CET (UTC+1)	Djimsiti (yellow card) 54'; Kolašinac (yellow card) 56'; Samardžić 70'; Zappacosta 88'	Report	(yellow card) 77' Maldini; (yellow card) 82' Caldirola; (yellow card) 90+3' Valoti	Stadium: Gewiss Stadium; Attendance: 22,142; Referee: Marco Piccinini

2 November 2024 11	Monza	0–1	Milan	Monza
20:45 CET (UTC+1)	Đurić (yellow card) 53'; Bondo (yellow card) 83'	Report	43' Reijnders; (yellow card) 47' Morata	Stadium: Stadio Brianteo; Attendance: 13,781; Referee: Ermanno Feliciani

10 November 2024 12	Monza	0–1	Lazio	Monza
18:00 CET (UTC+1)	Carboni (yellow card) 17'; Pereira (yellow card) 18'; Bianco (yellow card) 55'; Maldini (yellow card) 57'; Pessina (yellow card) 73'	Report	36' Zaccagni; (yellow card) 77' Isaksen	Stadium: Stadio Brianteo; Attendance: 11,706; Referee: Andrea Colombo

24 November 2024 13	Torino	1–1	Monza	Turin
15:00 CET (UTC+1)	Ché Adams (yellow card) 45'; Masina 59'	Report	(yellow card) 61' Bianco; 63' Đurić; (yellow card) 76' Izzo	Stadium: Stadio Grande Torino; Attendance: 21,944; Referee: Rosario Abisso

30 November 2024 14	Como	1–1	Monza	Como
15:00 CET (UTC+1)	Engelhardt 36'; Nico Paz (yellow card) 44'; Sala (yellow card) 83'; Iovine (yellow card) 90+2'	Report	54' (pen.) Caprari	Stadium: Stadio Giuseppe Sinigaglia; Attendance: 9,749; Referee: Juan Luca Sacchi

9 December 2024 15	Monza	1–2	Udinese	Monza
20:45 CET (UTC+1)	Kyriakopoulos 47'; Caprari (yellow card) 61'	Report	8' Lucca; (yellow card) 70' Karlström; 70' Bijol; (yellow card) 90+2' Iker Bravo	Stadium: Stadio Brianteo; Attendance: 9,317; Referee: Gianluca Manganiello

15 December 2024 16	Lecce	2–1	Monza	Lecce
12:30 CET (UTC+1)	Morente 3'; Rafia (yellow card) 28'; Krstović 44'	Report	(yellow card) 20' Kyriakopoulos; 37' (o.g.) Dorgu; (yellow card) 40' Izzo; (yellow card) 43' Bianco; (yellow card) 83' Maldini; (yellow card) 90+5' Pereira	Stadium: Stadio Via del mare Attendance: 23,663; Referee: Maurizio Mariani

22 December 2024 17	Monza	1–2	Juventus	Monza
20:45 CET (UTC+1)	Pereira (yellow card) 15'; Birindelli 22'	Report	14' McKennie; 39' González; (yellow card) 57' Conceição	Stadium: Stadio Brianteo; Attendance: 15,479; Referee: Davide Massa

28 December 2024 18	Parma	2–1	Monza	Parma
15:00 CET (UTC+1)	Hernani 56' (pen.); Valenti (yellow card) 63', (goal) 90+8'; Hainaut (yellow card) 78'; Camara (yellow card) 90+5'	Report	(yellow card) 28' Izzo; (yellow card) 28' D'Ambrosio; (yellow card) 34' (yellow-red card) Marí; (yellow card) 70' Carboni; (yellow card) 73' Birindelli; 85', (yellow card) 90+6' Pereira	Stadium: Stadio Ennio Tardini; Attendance: 17,499; Referee: Federico La Penna

5 January 2025 19	Monza	1–2	Cagliari	Monza
12:30 CET (UTC+1)	Caprari 6' (pen.); Bondo (yellow card) 30'; D'Ambrosio (red card) 63'; Bianco (yellow card) 88'	Report	22' Zortea; (yellow card) 45', (goal) 56' Piccoli; (yellow card) 67' Mina	Stadium: Stadio Brianteo; Attendance: 10,942; Referee: Marco Di Bello

13 January 2025 20	Monza	2–1	Fiorentina	Monza
20:45 CET (UTC+1)	Ciurria 44', (yellow card) 87'; Turati (yellow card) 61'; Maldini 63'; Pereira (yellow card) 76'; Bondo (yellow card) 87'	Report	74' (pen.) Beltrán; (yellow card) 87' Ranieri	Stadium: Stadio Brianteo; Attendance: 9,153; Referee: Federico Dionisi

18 January 2025 21	Bologna	3–1	Monza	Bologna
15:00 CET (UTC+1)	Castro 22', (yellow card) 45+1'; Odgaard 34'; Orsolini 69'	Report	4' Maldini; (yellow card) 24' Akpa Akpro; (yellow card) 36' Kyriakopoulos; (yellow card) 90+4' Izzo	Stadium: Stadio Renato Dall'Ara; Attendance: 23,381; Referee: Maurizio Mariani

27 January 2025 22	Genoa	2–0	Monza	Genoa
20:45 CET (UTC+1)	De Winter 61'; Vásquez 84'	Report	(yellow card) 20' Caprari; (yellow card) 30' Kyriakopoulos; (yellow card) 43' Akpa-Akpro; (yellow card) 62' Bianco	Stadium: Stadio Luigi Ferraris; Attendance: 29,976; Referee: Daniele Doveri

1 February 2025 23	Monza	0–1	Hellas Verona	Monza
15:00 CEST (UTC+1)	Izzo (yellow card) 56'; Martins (yellow card) 87'	Report	13' (o.g.) Leković; (yellow card) 29' Mosquera; (yellow card) 57' Niasse; (yellow card) 80' Bradarić	Stadium: Stadio Brianteo; Attendance: 11,723; Referee: Davide Massa

9 February 2025 24	Lazio	5–1	Monza	Rome
15:00 CET (UTC+1)	Marušić 31'; Pedro 57', 77'; Castellanos 63'; Dele-Bashiru 88'	Report	(yellow card) 45' Pereira; 86' (pen.) Sensi	Stadium: Stadio Olimpico; Attendance: 38,540; Referee: Gianluca Aureliano

16 February 2025 25	Monza	0–0	Lecce	Monza
15:00 CET (UTC+1)	Izzo (yellow card) 33'; Pereira (yellow card) 35'	Report	(yellow card) 37' Pierotti; (yellow card) 74' Ylber	Stadium: Stadio Brianteo; Attendance: 11,050; Referee: Giuseppe Collu

24 February 2025 26	Roma	4–0	Monza	Rome
20:45 CET (UTC+1)	Saelemaekers 10'; Shomurodov 32'; Angeliño 73'; Cristante 88'	Report	(yellow card) 58' Bianco	Stadium: Stadio Olimpico; Attendance: 56,965; Referee: Fabio Maresca

2 March 2025 27	Monza	0–2	Torino	Monza
12:30 CET (UTC+1)	Birindelli (yellow card) 28'; Palacios (yellow card) 80'	Report	41' Elmas; 66' Casadei; (yellow card) 80' Karamoh; (yellow card) 89' Coco	Stadium: Stadio Brianteo; Attendance: 11,053; Referee: Antonio Rapuano

8 March 2025 28	Internazionale	3–2	Monza	Milan
20:45 CET (UTC+1)	Arnautović 45+1'; Çalhanoğlu 64'; Kyriakopoulos 77' (o.g.)	Report	32' Birindelli; (yellow card) 38' Izzo; 44' Baldé	Stadium: Stadio San Siro; Attendance: 66,344; Referee: Luca Zufferli

15 March 2025 29	Monza	1–1	Parma	Monza
15:00 CET (UTC+1)	Izzo 60'	Report	(yellow card) 52' Leoni; (yellow card) 72' Haj; 84' Bonny; (yellow card) 87' Hernani	Stadium: Stadio Brianteo; Attendance: 9,251; Referee: Gianluca Manganiello

30 March 2025 30	Cagliari	3–0	Monza	Cagliari
12:30 CEST (UTC+2)	Luperto (yellow card) 12'; Viola 49'; Gaetano 73'; Piccoli (yellow card) 75'; Luvumbo 90+2'	Report	(yellow card) 29' Izzo; (yellow card) 67' Baldé	Stadium: Unipol Domus; Attendance: 16,319; Referee: Francesco Fourneau

5 April 2025 31	Monza	1–3	Como	Monza
15:00 CEST (UTC+2)	Mota 5'; Kyriakopoulos (yellow card) 24'; Bianco (yellow card) 38'; A.Nesta (yellow card) 42'	Report	Ikoné 16'; Diao 39'; Vojvoda 51', (yellow card) 55'	Stadium: Stadio Brianteo; Attendance: 8,469; Referee: Giuseppe Collu

12 April 2025 32	Venezia	1–0	Monza	Venice
15:00 CEST (UTC+2)	Zerbin (yellow card) 10'; Yeboah (yellow card) 62'; Ellertsson (yellow card) 67'; Fila 72', (yellow card) 82' (yellow-red card) 90+6'	Report	(yellow card) 27' Urbański; (yellow card) 68' Caldirola; (yellow card) 75' Pereira	Stadium: Stadio Pierluigi Penzo; Attendance: 10,001; Referee: Fabio Maresca

19 April 2025 33	Monza	0–1	Napoli	Monza
18:00 CEST (UTC+2)	Mota (yellow card) 33'; Akpa Akpro (yellow card) 54'; Bianco (yellow card) 70'; Caldirola (yellow card) 86'	Report	(yellow card) 30' Marín; 72' McTominay; (yellow card) 90' Ngonge	Stadium: Stadio Brianteo; Attendance: 13,784; Referee: Federico La Penna

27 April 2025 34	Juventus	2–0	Monza	Turin
18:00 CEST (UTC+2)	González 11'; Veiga (yellow card) 32'; Kolo Muani 33'; Yıldız (red card) 45+3'; Savona (yellow card) 59'; Costa (yellow card) 86'	Report	(yellow card) 75' Pereira; (yellow card) 79' Caldirola; (yellow card) 86' Carboni	Stadium: Allianz Stadium; Attendance: 40,016; Referee: Daniele Perenzoni

4 May 2025 35	Monza	0–4	Atalanta	Monza
15:00 CEST (UTC+2)	Palacios (yellow card) 51'	Report	12', 23' De Ketelaere; 47' Lookman; (yellow card) 71' Hien; (yellow card) 81' Cuadrado; 88' Brescianini	Stadium: Stadio Brianteo; Attendance: 10,440; Referee: Luca Pairetto

11 May 2025 36	Udinese	1–2	Monza	Udine
12:30 CEST (UTC+2)	Atta (yellow card) 50'; Lucca 75', (yellow card) 90+3'	Report	(yellow card) 13' Akpa Akpro; 52' Caprari; 90', (yellow card) 90+1' Baldé; (yellow card) 90+3' Pereira	Stadium: Stadio Friuli; Attendance: 20,845; Referee: Valero Crezzini

18 May 2025 37	Monza	1–3	Empoli	Monza
20:45 CEST (UTC+2)	Birindelli 30'	Report	49' Colombo; 51' Viti; 59' (o.g.) Pizzignacco; (yellow card) 87' Ismajli	Stadium: Stadio Brianteo; Attendance: 7,742; Referee: Livio Marinelli

24 May 2025 38	Milan	2–0	Monza	Milan
20:45 CEST (UTC+2)	Gabbia 64'; Félix 74'	Report	(yellow card) 51' Bianco	Stadium: Stadio San Siro; Attendance: 69,124; Referee: Daniele Rutella

=== Coppa Italia ===
9 August 2024 First round	Monza	0–0 (9–8 p)	Südtirol	Monza
21:15 CEST	Izzo (yellow card) 64'; Kyriakopoulos (yellow card) 81'; Sensi (yellow card) 89'	Report	(yellow card) 36' Arrigoni	Stadium: Stadio Brianteo; Attendance: 7,139; Referee: Francesco Cosso
	Penalties
	Caprari (penalty scored); Mota (penalty scored); Sensi (penalty scored); Caldirola (penalty scored); Marić (penalty scored); Pereira (penalty scored); Kyriakopoulos (penalty scored); Bondo (penalty scored); Izzo (penalty scored)		(penalty scored) Merkaj; (penalty scored) Molina; (penalty scored) Kurtić; (penalty scored) Arrigoni; (penalty scored) Crespi; (penalty scored) Masiello; (penalty scored) Davi; (penalty scored) Ceppitelli; (penalty missed) Praszelik

26 September 2024 Second round	Monza	3–1	Brescia	Monza
18:30 CEST	Kyriakopoulos 5'; Pessina 11'; Caprari 40'	Report	(yellow card) 33' Paghera; (yellow card) 38' Papetti; 68' Nuamah	Stadium: Stadio Brianteo; Attendance: 3,782; Referee: Federico Dionisi

3 December 2024 Round of 16	Bologna	4–0	Monza	Bologna
18:30 CET	Pobega 32'; Orsolini 35'; Domínguez 63'; Castro 76'		(yellow card) 65' Izzo	Stadium: Stadio Renato dall'Ara; Attendance: 11.952; Referee: Maria Ferrieri Caputi

== Player details ==
As of match played 26 August 2024

No.	Pos	Nat	Player	Total		Serie A		Coppa Italia	
No.	Pos	Nat	Player	Apps	Goals	Apps	Goals	Apps	Goals
1	GK	(Italy) ITA	Alessio Cragno	0	0	0	0	0	0
4	DF	(Italy) ITA	Armando Izzo	0	0	0	0	0	0
5	DF	(Italy) ITA	Luca Caldirola	0	0	0	0	0	0
6	MF	(Italy) ITA	Roberto Gagliardini	0	0	0	0	0	0
10	FW	(Italy) ITA	Gianluca Caprari	0	0	0	0	0	0
11	FW	(Bosnia and Herzegovina) BIH	Milan Đurić	0	0	0	0	0	0
12	FW	(Italy) ITA	Stefano Sensi	0	0	0	0	0	0
13	DF	(Portugal) POR	Pedro Pereira	0	0	0	0	0	0
14	FW	(Italy) ITA	Daniel Maldini	0	0	0	0	0	0
17	FW	(Italy) ITA	Davide Diaw	0	0	0	0	0	0
18	DF	(Italy) ITA	Davide Bettella	0	0	0	0	0	0
19	DF	(Italy) ITA	Samuele Birindelli	0	0	0	0	0	0
20	FW	(England) ENG	Omari Forson	0	0	0	0	0	0
21	GK	(Italy) ITA	Semuel Pizzignacco	0	0	0	0	0	0
22	DF	(Spain) ESP	Pablo Marí	0	0	0	0	0	0
24	FW	(Croatia) CRO	Mirko Marić	0	0	0	0	0	0
27	FW	(Italy) ITA	Mattia Valoti	0	0	0	0	0	0
30	GK	(Italy) ITA	Stefano Turati	0	0	0	0	0	0
32	MF	(Italy) ITA	Matteo Pessina	0	0	0	0	0	0
33	DF	(Italy) ITA	Danilo D'Ambrosio	0	0	0	0	0	0
37	FW	(Italy) ITA	Andrea Petagna	0	0	0	0	0	0
38	MF	(France) FRA	Warren Bondo	0	0	0	0	0	0
44	DF	(Italy) ITA	Andrea Carboni	0	0	0	0	0	0
47	FW	(Portugal) POR	Dany Mota	0	0	0	0	0	0
69	MF	(Italy) ITA	Andrea Mazza	0	0	0	0	0	0
70	MF	(Italy) ITA	Marco D'Alessandro	0	0	0	0	0	0
77	DF	(Greece) GRE	Giorgos Kyriakopoulos	0	0	0	0	0	0
80	MF	(Italy) ITA	Samuele Vignato	0	0	0	0	0	0
84	FW	(Italy) ITA	Patrick Ciurria	0	0	0	0	0	0
