= Jacopo Sardo =

Italian footballer (born 2005)

Personal information
- Date of birth: 8 March 2005 (age 21)
- Place of birth: Rome, Italy
- Height: 1.86 m (6 ft 1 in)
- Position: Midfielder

Team information
- Current team: Pescara (on loan from AC Milan)
- Number: 44

Youth career
- 2014–2019: Roma
- 2019–2020: Totti Soccer School
- 2020–2022: Ostiamare
- 2022–2024: Lazio

Senior career*
Years	Team	Apps	(Gls)
2024–2025	1. FC Saarbrücken	0	(0)
2025–2026	Monza	0	(0)
2026–	Milan Futuro (res.)	15	(3)
2026–	AC Milan	0	(0)
2026–	→ Pescara (loan)	7	(1)

International career^{‡}
2024–2025	Italy U20	8	(0)
- * Club domestic league appearances and goals as of 23:30, 12 October 2026 (UTC) ‡ National team caps and goals as of 23:45, 17 November 2025 (UTC)

Jacopo Sardo (born 8 March 2005) is an Italian professional footballer who plays as a midfielder for Serie C Group B club Pescara, on loan from AC Milan. He is a former Italian youth international.

== Club career ==
As a youth player, Sardo started his career with the youth academy of Roma from 2014 until 2019, following his stint there, he moved to the Totti Soccer School, with whom he played for one season. In 2020 Sardo moved to the youth academy of Ostiamare, and after two seasons, in 2022 he moved to the youth academy of Lazio.

=== 1. FC Saarbrücken ===
He moved to Germany and joined 3. Liga club 1. FC Saarbrücken in 2024. Sardo made his professional debut on 5 November 2024, as a starter during a 6–1 away win Saarland Cup match against SC Gresaubach, scoring two goals. Some days later he scored another goal on 16 November, as a starter during a 2–0 away win Saarland Cup match against SV Saar 05 Saarbrücken. He only featured twice with the team during his one-season spell in Germany.

=== Monza ===
In 2025, after one season in Germany, Sardo moved back to his native Italy and joined Monza, after the club was relegated to Serie B for the 2025–26 season.

=== AC Milan ===
On 9 January 2026, after just six-months with Monza, he moved to Serie D club Milan Futuro, the reserve team of Serie A club AC Milan. Two days later on January 11, Sardo made his debut during a 1–0 home loss Serie D match against Pavia, substituting Francesco Domniței at the 18th minute.

He was called-up with AC Milan by head coach Massimiliano Allegri, for the 2025–26 Serie A matchday 37 game against Genoa, as an unused substitute however, during the 2–1 away win on May 17.

==== Loan to Pescara ====
On 1 September 2026, Sardo joined newly Serie C relegated club Pescara, on loan for the 2026–27 season.

== International career ==
Sardo has represented Italy at the under-20 level since 2024.

== Career statistics ==
As of match played 12 October 2026

Appearances and goals by club, season and competition
Club	Season	League			Cup		Continental		Other		Total	
Club	Season	Division	Apps	Goals	Apps	Goals	Apps	Goals	Apps	Goals	Apps	Goals
1. FC Saarbrücken	2024–25	3. Liga	0	0	2 (Note: Appearances in Saarland Cup)	3	—		—		2	3
1. FC Saarbrücken	Total		0	0	2	0	—		—		2	3
Monza	2025–26	Serie B	0	0	0	0	—		—		0	0
Monza	Total		0	0	0	0	—		—		0	0
Milan Futuro	2025–26	Serie D	15	3	—		—		1 (Note: Appearance in Serie D play-offs)	1	16	4
Milan Futuro	Total		15	3	0	0	—		1	1	16	4
AC Milan	2025–26	Serie A	0	0	—		—		—		0	0
AC Milan	Total		0	0	—		—		—		0	0
Pescara (loan)	2026–27	Serie C	7	1	0	0	—		0	0	0	0
Pescara (loan)	Total		7	1	0	0	—		0	0	7	1
Career total			22	4	2	3	0	0	1	1	25	8
