= Lorenzo Lucchesi =

Italian footballer (born 2003)

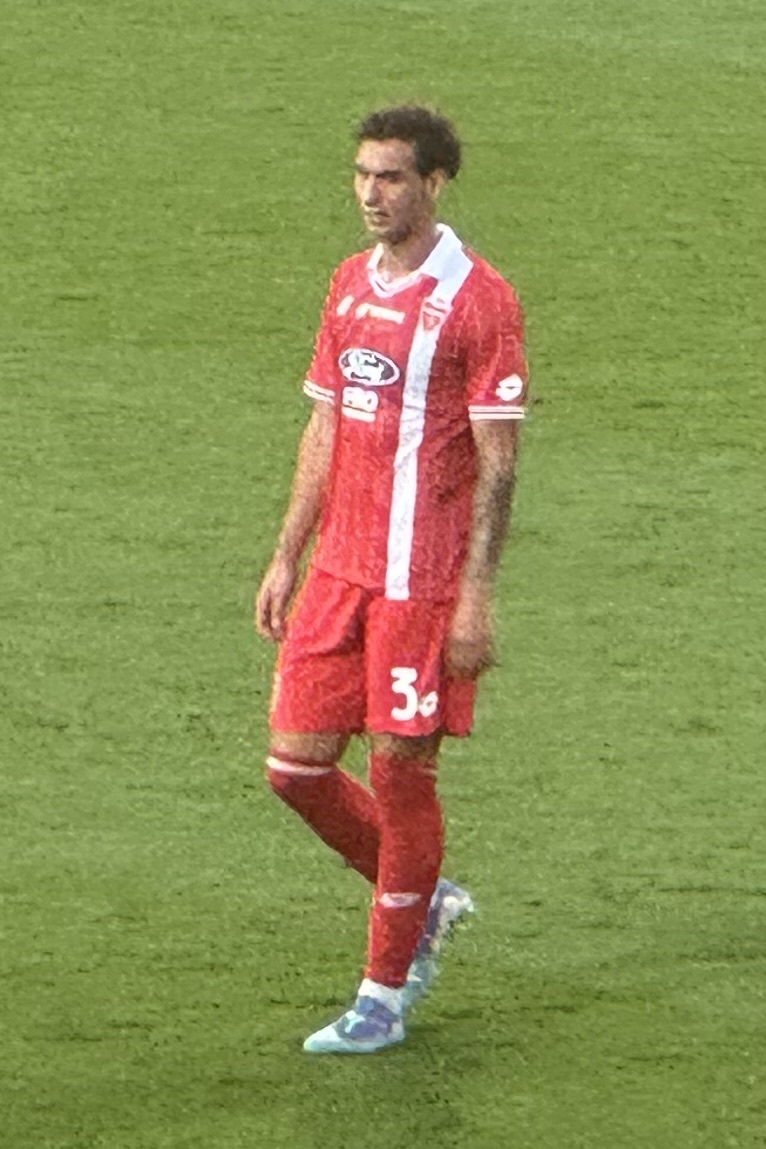
- Lucchesi with Monza in 2025

Personal information
- Date of birth: 9 May 2003 (age 23)
- Place of birth: Florence, Italy
- Height: 1.90 m (6 ft 3 in)
- Position: Defender

Team information
- Current team: Monza
- Number: 3

Youth career
- Sestese
- 2011–2017: Empoli
- 2017–2020: Juventus
- 2020–2023: Fiorentina

Senior career*
Years	Team	Apps	(Gls)
2023–2026	Fiorentina	0	(0)
2023–2024	→ Ternana (loan)	25	(2)
2024	→ Venezia (loan)	0	(0)
2024–2025	→ Reggiana (loan)	27	(2)
2025–2026	→ Monza (loan)	32	(1)
2026–	Monza	0	(0)

International career^{‡}
2018	Italy U15	1	(0)
2018	Italy U16	2	(0)
- * Club domestic league appearances and goals as of 30 May 2026 ‡ National team caps and goals as of 18 July 2025

Lorenzo Lucchesi (born 9 May 2003) is an Italian professional footballer who plays as a defender for Serie A club Monza.

== Club career ==
Having grown in the youth teams of Sestese, Empoli, Juventus, and Fiorentina, on 5 August 2023, Lucchesi was loaned to Ternana, where he began his professional career. On 9 December 2024, he scored his first professional goal in a 2–1 victory against Feralpisalò.

On 1 August 2024, Lucchesi was loaned out to Venezia, but left the club shortly after on 30 August – without having made any appearances – to join Reggiana on a one-year loan.

On 18 July 2025, Lucchesi was sent on loan to Monza. On 1 May 2026, he scored his first goal for Monza in a 3–2 home defeat to Mantova.

== International career ==
Lucchesi played for Italy's under-15 and under-16 teams in 2018. In 2023, he was called-up for the under-20s for a friendly tournament game against Germany, but did not feature.

== Style of play ==
A centre-back with a trained physique, Lucchesi is known for man-marking, is skilled with the ball, and can set up plays.

== Personal life ==
Lucchesi's older brothers, Niccolò (b. 1995) and Leonardo (b. 1999), are also footballers.

== Career statistics ==
=== Club ===
As of match played 13 May 2025

Appearances and goals by club, season and competition
Club	Season	League			Coppa Italia		Other		Total	
Club	Season	Division	Apps	Goals	Apps	Goals	Apps	Goals	Apps	Goals
Ternana (loan)	2023–24	Serie B	25	2	0	0	2 (Note: Appearances in Serie B relegation play-out)	0	27	2
Venezia (loan)	2024–25	Serie A	0	0	0	0	0	0	0	0
Reggiana (loan)	2024–25	Serie B	27	2	0	0	0	0	27	2
Monza (loan)	2025–26	Serie A	0	0	0	0	0	0	0	0
Career total			52	4	0	0	2	0	54	4
