= Kevin Martins =

Italian footballer (born 2005)

Personal information
- Full name: Kevin Maussi Martins
- Date of birth: 31 January 2005 (age 21)
- Place of birth: Milan, Italy
- Height: 1.80 m (5 ft 11 in)
- Position: Winger

Team information
- Current team: Monza
- Number: 70

Youth career
- –2018: AC Milan
- 2018–2023: Inter Milan
- 2023–2024: Monza

Senior career*
Years	Team	Apps	(Gls)
2024–	Monza	9	(0)
2025–2026	→ Sambenedettese (loan)	8	(0)

International career
2019	Italy U15	3	(1)
- * Club domestic league appearances and goals as of 30 April 2026

Kevin Maussi Martins (born 31 January 2005) is an Italian professional footballer who plays as a winger for Serie A club Monza.

== Club career ==
Martins began his youth career at AC Milan, before switching to cross-city rivals Inter Milan's youth setup in 2018. In January 2023, he joined Monza's youth team.

On 26 September 2024, Martins made his senior debut for Monza as a starter in a 3–1 win against Brescia in the Coppa Italia; he played the full 90 minutes and assisted the first goal. Martins finished the 2024–25 season with nine Serie A appearances.

On 1 September 2025, Martins renewed his contract with Monza until 30 June 2028, and was sent on a one-year loan to Serie C club Sambenedettese. He played eight league games.

== International career ==
Born in Italy of mixed Nigerian and Togolese descent, Martins holds Italian and Nigerian citizenship.

In November 2019, Martins made his national-team debut for Italy U15, scoring directly from a corner kick in a 4–1 win against Portugal.

== Personal life ==
Martins is the son of former Nigerian footballer Obafemi Martins and Togolese singer Zelie Adjo.

== Career statistics ==
=== Club ===
As of match played 20 March 2026

Appearances and goals by club, season and competition
Club	Season	League			Coppa Italia		Total	
Club	Season	Division	Apps	Goals	Apps	Goals	Apps	Goals
Monza	2024–25	Serie A	9	0	2	0	11	0
Sambenedettese (loan)	2025–26	Serie C	8	0	—		8	0
Career total			17	0	2	0	19	0

== See also ==
- List of association football families
