= Andrea Petagna =

Italian footballer (born 1995)

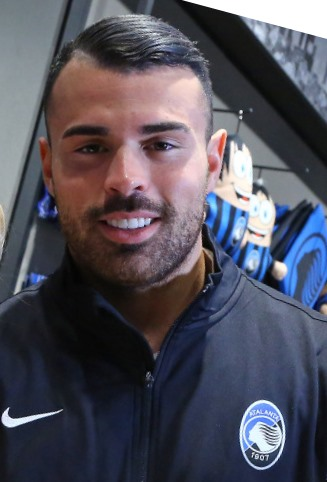
- Petagna with Atalanta in 2017

Personal information
- Date of birth: 30 June 1995 (age 31)
- Place of birth: Trieste, Italy
- Height: 1.90 m (6 ft 3 in)
- Position: Striker

Team information
- Current team: Pisa
- Number: 37

Youth career
- 2006–2008: Itala San Marco
- 2008–2009: Donatello
- 2009–2013: AC Milan

Senior career*
Years	Team	Apps	(Gls)
2012–2016	AC Milan	3	(0)
2013–2014	→ Sampdoria (loan)	3	(0)
2014–2015	→ Latina (loan)	10	(0)
2015	→ Vicenza (loan)	12	(1)
2015–2016	→ Ascoli (loan)	18	(4)
2016–2019	Atalanta	63	(9)
2016	→ Ascoli (loan)	14	(3)
2018–2019	→ SPAL (loan)	36	(16)
2019–2020	SPAL	21	(8)
2020–2023	Napoli	50	(7)
2022–2023	→ Monza (loan)	31	(4)
2023–2026	Monza	40	(9)
2023–2024	→ Cagliari (loan)	18	(1)
2026–	Pisa	0	(0)

International career^{‡}
2010–2011	Italy U16	5	(0)
2011	Italy U17	1	(0)
2013	Italy U18	7	(2)
2013	Italy U19	4	(2)
2015	Italy U20	5	(2)
2016–2017	Italy U21	7	(1)
2017	Italy	1	(0)
- * Club domestic league appearances and goals as of 23:12, 8 May 2026 (UTC) ‡ National team caps and goals as of 27 June 2017

Andrea Petagna (Italian pronunciation: [anˈdrɛːa peˈtaɲɲa]; born 30 June 1995) is an Italian professional footballer who plays as a striker for Serie B club Pisa. He has also previously represented the Italy national team.

== Club career ==
=== AC Milan and loans ===
Petagna started his football career in AC Milan's youth system, where he was a member of the under-15 squad who won the Campionato Nazionale Giovanissimi in 2010 and a member of the under-17 squad who won the Campionato Nazionale Allievi the following year. He made his professional debut on 4 December 2012, coming on as a substitute in the late stages of a UEFA Champions League group stage home game against Zenit St. Petersburg, which Milan lost 0–1.

At the start of the 2013–14 season, Petagna was promoted full-time to the first team. He made his Serie A debut on 24 August 2013, coming on as a late substitute in the opening game, a 2–1 away loss against newly promoted Hellas Verona. However, following the acquisition of Alessandro Matri in the late days of the summer transfer window, Milan decided they would let Petagna go out on loan to Sampdoria in order to gain more first team experience. Sampdoria also had the option to make the deal a co-ownership agreement at the end of the season-long loan spell. In spite of that, the loan was terminated early and Petagna returned to Milan in January, having made five scoreless appearances during his stay at Sampdoria. He finished the season with three more senior appearances, while being mainly employed by the under-19 squad managed by Filippo Inzaghi. The side won the Viareggio Cup in February, defeating Anderlecht in the final, with Petagna scoring the equaliser for the rossoneri in a 3–1 win.

On 16 July 2014, Petagna was loaned out to Serie B side Latina ahead of the 2014–15 season. On 13 January 2015, he was signed by Vicenza on loan.

On 30 August 2015, he was signed by Serie B newcomers Ascoli on loan.

=== Atalanta and Ascoli loan ===
On 25 January 2016, Petagna signed for Atalanta and was loaned to former club Ascoli until 30 June 2016.

=== SPAL ===
On 19 July 2018, Petagna signed for SPAL on loan until 30 June 2019 with an obligation to buy. He scored his first goal with S.P.A.L. in his debut match on 12 August, scoring the final 1–0 goal in the Coppa Italia third round match against Spezia He scored his first Serie A goals with the Emilian side on 17 September, scoring a double that allowed the Biancazzurri to beat his former side Atalanta 2–0. He made 37 appearances scoring 17 goals in all competitions, On 1 July 2019, Petagna was signed on a permanent deal by SPAL.

=== Napoli ===
On 30 January 2020, Petagna signed with Napoli. He stayed at SPAL on loan until the end of 2019–20 season.

=== Monza ===
On 12 August 2022, Petagna joined newly promoted Serie A side Monza, with an obligation for purchase if certain conditions are met. He made his debut for Monza on 14 August, as a starter in a 2–1 Serie A defeat to Torino.

On 19 October Petagna scored his first goal for the biancorossi, sealing the 3–2 comeback win in the round of 32 match against Udinese. On 31 October, he scored the first goal Serie A goal for Monza, from a penalty kick, momentarily giving his side the advantage in the home match against Bologna, which eventually ended in a 2–1 defeat.

When Monza guaranteed survival in the Serie A, Petagna's obligation-to-buy clause was triggered, forcing the Lombardy club to permanently acquire the striker for a reported total cost of €14 million.

=== Cagliari (loan) ===
On 30 August 2023, recently promoted to Serie A side Cagliari announced the signing of Petagna on a season-long loan from Monza, with an option to make the move permanent.

== International career ==
Petagna won five caps for Italy under-16 between 2010 and 2011. In 2011, he won one further cap for Italy under-17. He went on to be capped for Italy under-18, making eight appearances and scoring two goals in 2013. In 2013, he was also capped for Italy under-19, making his first appearance on 24 April.

He made his debut with the Italy U21 team on 11 October 2016, in the 2017 European U21 Championship qualification match against Lithuania in Kaunas.

On 28 March 2017, Petagna made his senior international debut for the Italy national football team, along with four other players, coming on as a substitute in a 2–1 friendly away win against the Netherlands.

In June 2017, he was included in the Italy under-21 squad for the 2017 UEFA European Under-21 Championship by manager Luigi Di Biagio. On 18 June, he scored in Italy's opening match of the tournament, a 2–0 win over Denmark; this was also his only goal for the Italy U21 side. Italy were eliminated in the semi-finals following a 3–1 defeat to Spain on 27 June. Petagna gained notoriety at the tournament after winning the semifinal game, when he celebrated by taking his shorts off and showing off his briefs.

== Personal life ==
Petagna is the grandson of a former football player and coach Francesco Petagna (1923–2000). Through his mother Alessandra, Petagna is Jewish. His great-grandfather was murdered at Auschwitz.

== Career statistics ==
=== Club ===
As of match played 29 May 2026

Appearances and goals by club, season and competition
Club	Season	League			Coppa Italia		Europe		Other		Total	
Club	Season	Division	Apps	Goals	Apps	Goals	Apps	Goals	Apps	Goals	Apps	Goals
AC Milan	2012–13	Serie A	0	0	0	0	1 (Note: Appearance in UEFA Champions League)	0	—		1	0
AC Milan	2013–14	Serie A	3	0	1	0	—		—		4	0
AC Milan	Total		3	0	1	0	1	0	—		5	0
Sampdoria (loan)	2013–14	Serie A	3	0	2	0	—		—		5	0
Latina (loan)	2014–15	Serie B	10	0	1	0	—		—		11	0
Vicenza (loan)	2014–15	Serie B	14	1	—		—		—		14	1
Ascoli (loan)	2015–16	Serie B	32	7	—		—		—		32	7
Atalanta	2016–17	Serie A	34	5	2	0	—		—		36	5
Atalanta	2017–18	Serie A	29	4	2	0	8 (Note: Appearances in UEFA Europa League)	2	—		39	6
Atalanta	Total		63	9	4	0	8	2	—		75	11
SPAL (loan)	2018–19	Serie A	36	16	1	1	—		—		37	17
SPAL	2019–20	Serie A	36	12	1	0	—		—		37	12
SPAL	SPAL total		72	28	2	1	—		—		74	29
Napoli	2020–21	Serie A	26	4	3	1	6	0	1 (Note: Appearance in Supercoppa Italiana)	0	36	5
Napoli	2021–22	Serie A	24	3	1	1	7	0	—		32	4
Napoli	Total		50	7	4	2	13	0	1	0	68	9
Monza (loan)	2022–23	Serie A	31	4	1	1	—		—		32	5
Monza	2023–24	Serie A	0	0	0	0	—		—		0	0
Monza	2024–25	Serie A	13	0	2	0	—		—		15	0
Monza	2025–26	Serie B	27	9	0	0	—		4 (Note: Appearances in Serie B promotion play-offs)	0	31	9
Monza	Monza total		71	13	3	1	—		4	0	78	14
Cagliari (loan)	2023–24	Serie A	18	1	2	0	—		—		20	1
Career total			336	66	19	4	22	2	5	0	389	72

=== International ===
As of match played 28 March 2017

Appearances and goals by national team and year
National team	Year	Apps	Goals
Italy	2017	1	0
Total		1	0
