= 2022–23 Feralpisalò season =

Feralpisalò
2022–23 season
- Chairman: Giuseppe Pasini
- Manager: Stefano Vecchi
- Stadium: Stadio Lino Turina
- Serie C: 1st (promoted)
- Coppa Italia Serie C: Second round

The 2022–23 Feralpisalò season was the club's 14th season in existence and its seventh consecutive season in the third division of Italian football. In addition to the domestic league, Feralpisalò participated in this season's edition of the Coppa Italia Serie C. The season covered the period from 1 July 2022 to 30 June 2023.

== Players ==
=== First-team squad ===
As of 25 February 2023

Note: Flags indicate national team as defined under FIFA eligibility rules; some limited exceptions apply. Players may hold more than one non-FIFA nationality.

No.	Pos.	Nation	Player
1	GK	ITA	Semuel Pizzignacco
2	DF	ITA	Federico Bergonzi (on loan from Atalanta)
3	DF	ITA	Mattia Tonetto
4	MF	ITA	Mattia Musatti
6	DF	ITA	Loris Bacchetti
7	MF	ITA	Andrea Palazzi
8	MF	ITA	Davide Balestrero
9	FW	CRO	Karlo Butić
10	FW	ITA	Davide Di Molfetta
11	FW	ITA	Filippo Pittarello (on loan from Cesena)
13	DF	ITA	Elia Legati (captain)
14	DF	ITA	Ciro Panico (on loan from Cosenza)
15	DF	ITA	Matteo Di Gennaro (on loan from Triestina)

No.	Pos.	Nation	Player
16	MF	ITA	Simone Icardi (on loan from Cittadella)
17	FW	ITA	Simone Guerra
19	DF	ITA	Alessandro Pilati
20	FW	ITA	Marco Sau
21	MF	ITA	Federico Carraro
22	GK	ITA	Giacomo Volpe
23	MF	ITA	Davide Voltan (on loan from Südtirol)
25	MF	ITA	Mattia Zennaro (on loan from Genoa)
26	FW	ITA	Luca Siligardi
27	MF	ROU	Denis Hergheligiu
30	MF	ITA	Alessandro Pietrelli
31	DF	ITA	Emmanuele Salines

=== Out on loan ===
Note: Flags indicate national team as defined under FIFA eligibility rules; some limited exceptions apply. Players may hold more than one non-FIFA nationality.

No. / Pos. / Nation / Player; — / DF / ITA / Christian Dimarco (at Fiorenzuola until 30 June 2023)	No. / Pos. / Nation / Player; — / DF / ITA / Mauro Verzeletti (at Villa Valle until 30 June 2023)

== Pre-season and friendlies ==
Win Draw Loss Fixtures

August 2022 Friendly	(Italy)	v	(Italy) Feralpisalò
CEST (UTC+2)

== Competitions ==
=== Overview ===
Competition	First match	Last match	Starting round	Final position	Record							
Competition	First match	Last match	Starting round	Final position	Pld	W	D	L	GF	GA	GD	Win %
Serie C	4 September 2022	22 April 2023	Matchday 1	Winners	38	20	11	7	41	21	+20	52.63
Coppa Italia Serie C	2 November 2022		Second round	Second round	1	0	0	1	2	5	−3	0.00
Total					39	20	11	8	43	26	+17	51.28

Source: [ Soccerway]

=== Serie C ===
==== League table ====
Pos	Team	Pld	W	D	L	GF	GA	GD	Pts	Qualification
1	Feralpisalò (C, P)	38	20	11	7	41	21	+20	71	Promotion to Serie B. Qualification for the Supercoppa di Serie C
2	Pordenone (E)	38	16	14	8	53	35	+18	62 (Note: Pordenone ahead of Lecco due to head-to-head matches: POR-LEC 5-0; LEC-POR 0-0)	Excluded
3	Lecco (O, P)	38	17	11	10	45	40	+5	62	Qualification for the promotion play-offs national phase
4	Pro Sesto	38	16	12	10	46	45	+1	60	Qualification for the promotion play-offs group phase (Note: Since Vicenza, the winners of the 2022-23 Coppa Italia Serie C, finished within the top 10 places in the group, Pergolettese, the 11-th placed team, qualifies for the group phase of the promotion play-offs.)
5	Padova	38	15	14	9	47	40	+7	59	Qualification for the promotion play-offs group phase

Updated to match(es) played on 16 April 2023. Source: Lega Pro, Soccerway (in English)
Rules for classification: 1) Points; 2) Head-to-head points; 3) Head-to-head goal difference; 4) Goal difference; 5) Goals scored; 6) Lower goals against; 7) Wins; 8) Lower losses; 9) Away wins; 10) Lower home losses.
(C) Champions; (E) Eliminated; (O) Play-off winners; (P) Promoted

==== Results summary ====
Overall								Home						Away					
Pld	W	D	L	GF	GA	GD	Pts	W	D	L	GF	GA	GD	W	D	L	GF	GA	GD
0	0	0	0	0	0	0	0	0	0	0	0	0	0	0	0	0	0	0	0

Source: Soccerway

==== Results by round ====
Round	1
Ground	
Result	
Position	

Updated to match(es) played on March 2023. Source:
A = Away; H = Home; W = Win; D = Draw; L = Loss

==== Matches ====
The league fixtures were announced on 26 August 2022.

September 2022	Feralpisalò	–
CET (UTC+1)

=== Coppa Italia Serie C ===
2 November 2022 Second round	Feralpisalò	2–5	Juventus Next Gen
CET (UTC+1)
