= Adam Bakoune =

Footballer (born 2006)

Personal information
- Date of birth: 6 February 2006 (age 20)
- Place of birth: Wrocław, Poland
- Height: 1.92 m (6 ft 4 in)
- Positions: Full-back; wing-back

Team information
- Current team: Monza
- Number: 24

Youth career
- 2015–2025: AC Milan
- 2025: Monza

Senior career*
Years	Team	Apps	(Gls)
2025–	Monza	26	(0)

International career^{‡}
2022	Italy U16	4	(0)
2022–2024	Italy U18	10	(0)
2023–2024	Italy U19	3	(0)
2024–2026	Italy U20	6	(1)
2026	Italy U21	1	(0)
2026–	Morocco U23	2	(0)
- * Club domestic league appearances and goals as of 8 November 2026 ‡ National team caps and goals as of 12 November 2026

Adam Bakoune (Arabic: آدم باكون; born 6 February 2006) is a professional footballer who plays as a full-back or wing-back for Serie A club Monza. Born in Poland, he played internationally for Italy at the youth level before switching to play for Morocco.

== Early life ==
Bakoune was born in Wrocław, Poland, on 6 February 2006. He is Italian and of Moroccan descent.

== Club career ==
=== Youth ===
Bakoune developed through the youth academy of AC Milan. During his time with the club's Primavera side, he made 75 league appearances and 20 appearances in the UEFA Youth League. He was also described by Italian media outlets as one of the more promising Italian football prospects born in 2006. He departed the club in 2025, after 10 years.

=== Monza ===
On 5 July 2025, Serie B club Monza announced the signing of Bakoune from AC Milan on a permanent deal. He signed a contract until 30 June 2027, with an option for an additional season. Bakoune's debut came on 20 December 2025, in a 4–1 Serie B win against Carrarese. He played 18 games throughout the season, and an additional four games in the promotion play-offs, as Monza secured promotion to Serie A.

On 22 August 2026, Bakoune made his Serie A debut in the opening match of the 2026–27 season, starting in a 4–1 away defeat to Inter Milan.

== International career ==
Bakoune represented Italy at various youth international levels up to the under-21 team. He received his first call-up to the under-21s in May 2026, and made his debut in a friendly 1–0 win against Albania on 8 June 2026.

In September 2026, Bakoune was called up to the Morocco national under-23 team for two friendly games against Mali and Tanzania.

== Style of play ==
Bakoune is a full-back who mainly plays on the right side, and has occasionally played as a wing-back; he is noted for his speed and physical attributes.

== Career statistics ==
=== Club ===
As of match played 18 September 2026

Appearances and goals by club, season and competition
Club	Season	League			Coppa Italia		Other		Total	
Club	Season	Division	Apps	Goals	Apps	Goals	Apps	Goals	Apps	Goals
Monza	2025–26	Serie B	18	0	0	0	4 (Note: Appearances in Serie B promotion play-offs)	0	22	0
Monza	2026–27	Serie A	4	0	2	0	—		6	0
Monza	Total		22	0	2	0	4	0	28	0
Career total			22	0	2	0	4	0	28	0
