= Kevin Zeroli =

Italian footballer (born 2005)

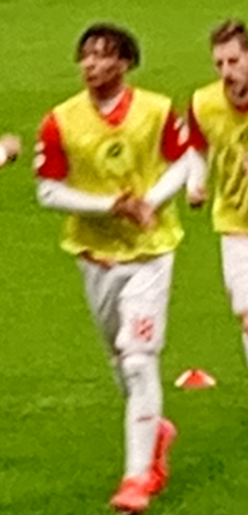
- Zeroli with Monza in 2025

Personal information
- Date of birth: 11 January 2005 (age 21)
- Place of birth: Busto Arsizio, Italy
- Height: 1.87 m (6 ft 2 in)
- Position: Midfielder

Team information
- Current team: Südtirol (on loan from AC Milan)
- Number: 18

Youth career
- –2010: UC Ardor Busto Arsizio ASD
- 2010–2024: AC Milan

Senior career*
Years	Team	Apps	(Gls)
2023–	AC Milan	4	(0)
2024–	Milan Futuro (res.)	15	(4)
2025–2026	→ Monza (loan)	13	(0)
2026	→ Juve Stabia (loan)	8	(1)
2026–	→ Südtirol (loan)	6	(0)

International career^{‡}
2023–2024	Italy U19	12	(4)
2024–2025	Italy U20	6	(1)
2025–	Italy U21	3	(0)
- * Club domestic league appearances and goals as of 23:45, 7 November 2026 (UTC) ‡ National team caps and goals as of 13 November 2026

Kevin Zeroli (born 11 January 2005) is an Italian professional footballer who plays as a midfielder for Serie B club Südtirol, on loan from AC Milan. He is an Italian youth international.

== Club career ==
=== AC Milan ===
Zeroli is a youth product of his boyhood club AC Milan, having joined them at the age of five. He signed a professional contract with AC Milan in June 2023 until 2027. He went on to captain their U19 squad for the 2023–24 season. He made both his senior and professional debut as a substitute for AC Milan in a 1–0 Serie A match home win over Sassuolo on 30 December 2023.

Zeroli made his debut for the newly created reserve team Milan Futuro on 10 August 2024, starting the game as the first ever captain for a 3–0 away win Coppa Italia Serie C first round match against Lecco.

==== Loan to Monza ====
On 3 February 2025, Zeroli moved to fellow Serie A club Monza, on six-month loan until the end of the 2024–25 season. On 21 June 2025, his loan-spell was extended for the 2025–26 season, with Monza now relegated to Serie B.

==== Loan to Juve Stabia ====
On 7 January 2026, his loan-spell with Monza was cut short and he moved to fellow Serie B club Juve Stabia, on loan for the rest of the 2025–26 season.

==== Loan to Südtirol ====
On 1 September 2026, Zeroli joined Serie B club Südtirol, on loan for the 2026–27 season, with the option to make the move permanent.

== International career ==
Zeroli was born in Italy to an Italian father and Nigerian mother, and holds dual citizenship. He is a youth international for Italy, having played for the Italy U19s for 2024 UEFA European Under-19 Championship qualifying matches in November 2023.

== Playing style ==
Originally a centre-back in his youth, Zeroli is a classic 8 midfielder who can play in a 2-man or 3-man midfielder. He has a strong frame at 1.87 m, and is adept at heading the ball.

== Personal life ==
Zeroli is the son of an Italian father and a Nigerian mother. His older brother, Bryan Zeroli, is also a footballer who played in AC Milan's youth sides.

== Career statistics ==
=== Club ===
As of match played 15 September 2026

Appearances and goals by club, season and competition
Club	Season	League			Cup (Note: Includes Coppa Italia, Coppa Italia Serie C)		Europe		Other		Total	
Club	Season	Division	Apps	Goals	Apps	Goals	Apps	Goals	Apps	Goals	Apps	Goals
AC Milan	2023–24	Serie A	3	0	1	0	0	0	—		4	0
AC Milan	2024–25	Serie A	1	0	0	0	0	0	0	0	1	0
AC Milan	Total		4	0	1	0	0	0	0	0	5	0
Milan Futuro	2024–25	Serie C	15	4	2	0	—		—		17	4
Milan Futuro	Total		15	4	2	0	—		—		17	4
Monza (loan)	2024–25	Serie A	8	0	—		—		—		8	0
Monza (loan)	2025–26	Serie B	5	0	0	0	—		—		5	0
Monza (loan)	Total		13	0	0	0	—		—		13	0
Juve Stabia (loan)	2025–26	Serie B	8	1	0	0	—		3 (Note: Three appearances in the promotion play-offs)	1	11	2
Juve Stabia (loan)	Total		8	1	0	0	—		3	1	11	2
Südtirol (loan)	2026–27	Serie B	2	0	1	0	—		0	0	3	2
Südtirol (loan)	Total		2	0	1	0	—		0	0	3	0
Career total			42	5	4	0	0	0	3	1	49	6

== Honours ==
AC Milan

- Supercoppa Italiana: 2024–25
