= Arvid Brorsson =

Swedish footballer (born 1999)

Personal information
- Full name: Per Arvid Viking Brorsson
- Date of birth: 8 May 1999 (age 27)
- Place of birth: Örebro, Sweden
- Height: 1.88 m (6 ft 2 in)
- Position: Centre-back

Team information
- Current team: Raków Częstochowa
- Number: 3

Youth career
- 2003–2007: Östra Almby FK
- 2007–2015: IK Sturehov
- 2015–2017: Örebro SK

Senior career*
Years	Team	Apps	(Gls)
2017–2021	Örebro SK	35	(0)
2020	→ Örgryte IS (loan)	21	(0)
2021–2023	Örgryte IS	48	(0)
2023–2025	Mjällby AIF	57	(4)
2025–2026	Monza	18	(0)
2026–	Raków Częstochowa	0	(0)

International career
2016	Sweden U17	1	(0)
2017	Sweden U18	5	(0)
2017–2018	Sweden U19	2	(0)
2019	Sweden U21	1	(0)
- * Club domestic league appearances and goals as of 12 May 2026

Per Arvid Viking Brorsson (born 8 May 1999) is a Swedish professional footballer who plays as a centre-back for Ekstraklasa club Raków Częstochowa.

== Club career ==
=== Örebro SK ===
Starting his youth career at Östra Almby FK in 2003, Brorsson moved to IK Sturehov's youth team in 2007, before joining his hometown club Örebro SK in 2015. He signed his first professional contract with Örebro on 1 December 2016, and made his first-team debut on 17 May 2017, during an Allsvenskan match against GIF Sundsvall.

On 21 August 2019, Brorsson suffered an injury during a Svenska Cupen game against Nyköpings BIS and was sidelined for several months, ending his season prematurely.

=== Örgryte IS ===
After playing for Örgryte IS on loan in the second half of the 2020 season, on 22 March 2021, Brorsson moved there on a permanent basis and signed a two-year contract.

=== Mjällby AIF ===
In January 2023, Brorsson signed for Mjällby AIF on a contract for the duration of the 2023 season.

He scored his first professional goal on the first day of the 2023 Allsvenskan season, on 3 April 2023, against Varbergs BoIS. He played as a starter in a 2–2 draw.

=== Monza ===
On 29 January 2025, Brorsson moved to Italy, joining Serie A club Monza on a contract until June 2027.

=== Raków Częstochowa ===
On 18 August 2026, Brorsson joined Polish club Raków Częstochowa on a three-year contract, with the option to extend the deal by an additional year.

== International career ==
Brorsson played two matches with Sweden U19 in the 2018 UEFA European Under-19 Championship qualification, against Moldova (3–0 victory) and Serbia (3–2 defeat). He received his first call-up to the Sweden U21 team on 7 June 2019, for a friendly match against Norway, playing as a starter in a 3–1 win.

== Career statistics ==
As of match played 27 August 2026

Appearances and goals by club, season and competition
Club	Season	League			National cup (Note: Includes Svenska Cupen, Coppa Italia)		Europe		Other		Total	
Club	Season	Division	Apps	Goals	Apps	Goals	Apps	Goals	Apps	Goals	Apps	Goals
Örebro SK	2017	Allsvenskan	14	0	0	0	—		—		14	0
Örebro SK	2018	Allsvenskan	4	0	0	0	—		—		4	0
Örebro SK	2019	Allsvenskan	15	0	4	0	—		—		19	0
Örebro SK	2020	Allsvenskan	2	0	0	0	—		—		2	0
Örebro SK	Total		35	0	4	0	—		—		39	0
Örgryte IS (loan)	2020	Superettan	21	0	—		—		—		21	0
Örgryte IS	2021	Superettan	23	0	1	0	—		—		24	0
Örgryte IS	2022	Superettan	25	0	2	1	—		2 (Note: Appearances in Superettan relegation play-offs)	1	29	2
Örgryte IS	Total		48	0	3	1	—		2	1	53	2
Mjällby AIF	2023	Allsvenskan	29	2	5	0	—		—		34	2
Mjällby AIF	2024	Allsvenskan	28	2	5	0	—		—		33	2
Mjällby AIF	Total		57	4	10	0	—		—		67	4
Monza	2024–25	Serie A	6	0	—		—		—		6	0
Monza	2025–26	Serie B	12	0	1	0	—		—		13	0
Monza	Total		18	0	1	0	—		—		19	0
Raków Częstochowa	2026–27	Ekstraklasa	0	0	0	0	2 (Note: Appearances in UEFA Conference League)	0	—		2	0
Career total			179	4	18	1	2	0	2	1	201	6

== Honours ==
Mjällby AIF

- Svenska Cupen runner-up: 2022–23
