= Semuel Pizzignacco =

Italian footballer (born 2001)

Personal information
- Date of birth: 1 September 2001 (age 25)
- Place of birth: Monfalcone, Italy
- Height: 1.85 m (6 ft 1 in)
- Position: Goalkeeper

Team information
- Current team: Carrarese (on loan from Monza)
- Number: 1

Youth career
- 2008–2015: Staranzano
- 2015–2017: Cjarlins Muzane
- 2017–2018: Udinese

Senior career*
Years	Team	Apps	(Gls)
2017–2018	Udinese	0	(0)
2018–2022	Vicenza	3	(0)
2020–2021	→ Legnago (loan)	35	(0)
2022	→ Renate (loan)	13	(0)
2022–2025	Feralpisalò	75	(0)
2024–2025	→ Monza (loan)	4	(0)
2025–	Monza	5	(0)
2026–	→ Carrarese (loan)	0	(0)

International career^{‡}
2021	Italy U20	2	(0)
- * Club domestic league appearances and goals as of 22:07, 26 May 2025 (UTC) ‡ National team caps and goals as of 15 November 2021

Semuel Pizzignacco (born 1 September 2001) is an Italian professional footballer who plays as a goalkeeper for Serie B club Carrarese, on loan from Monza.

== Club career ==
=== Early career ===
Born in Monfalcone, Italy, Pizzignacco began his youth career at local club Staranzano, before joining Cjarlins Muzane in 2015 for two years. In 2017, he joined Udinese's youth team where he was called-up to several 2017–18 Serie A games at the age of 16.

=== Vicenza and loans ===
In summer 2018, Pizzignacco moved to Vicenza. He signed his first professional contract with the club on 29 June 2020, for a term of three years. On 1 October 2020, he was loaned to Serie C club Legnago. He made his professional debut for Legnago on 4 October 2020 against Ravenna. He became the first-choice goalkeeper there, playing 37 games in the season.

Upon his return from loan, he made his Serie B debut for Vicenza on 21 August 2021 against Cittadella. He played two more games in the 2021–22 season. On 31 January 2022, Pizzignacco was loaned to Serie C club Renate, where he completed the 2021–22 season.

=== Feralpisalò ===
On 14 July 2022, following Vicenza's relegation to Serie C, Pizzignacco officially joined fellow third-tier side Feralpisalò on a permanent deal, signing a three-year deal. In his first season at the club, he helped Feralpisalò gain promotion to the Serie B. The following season, in 2023–24, he played all 38 games in the Serie B as a starter.

=== Monza ===
On 5 August 2024, Pizzignacco joined Serie A club Monza on a season-long loan, with an obligation to buy under certain conditions. He made his debut for the club four days later, starting in a Coppa Italia match against Südtirol; in the occasion, he saved Mateusz Praszelik's penalty during the shoot-out, thus helping his side win and advance to the following round. On 3 February 2025, Monza made the deal permanent, signing Pizzignacco on a contract until June 2027.

On 28 August 2026, Pizzignacco renews his contract with Monza until 2029, and was sent on a one-year loan to Carrarese in Serie B.

== International career ==
On 6 September 2021, Pizzignacco made his debut for his country on junior level, in an under-20 team friendly against Serbia. On 1 October 2021, he received his first call-up to the under-21 squad.

== Career statistics ==
=== Club ===
As of match played 24 May 2025

Appearances and goals by club, season and competition
Club	Season	League			Coppa Italia		Other		Total	
Club	Season	Division	Apps	Goals	Apps	Goals	Apps	Goals	Apps	Goals
Vicenza	2020–21	Serie B	0	0	0	0	—		0	0
Vicenza	2021–22	Serie B	3	0	1	0	—		4	0
Vicenza	Total		3	0	1	0	—		4	0
Legnago (loan)	2020–21	Serie C	35	0	—		2 (Note: Appearances in Serie C relegation play-outs)	0	37	0
Renate (loan)	2021–22	Serie C	13	0	—		0	0	13	0
Feralpisalò	2022–23	Serie C	37	0	2	0	2 (Note: Appearances in Supercoppa di Serie C)	0	41	0
Feralpisalò	2023–24	Serie B	38	0	2	0	—		40	0
Feralpisalò	Total		75	0	4	0	2	0	81	0
Monza (loan)	2024–25	Serie A	4	0	3	0	—		7	0
Monza	2024–25	Serie A	5	0	—		—		5	0
Monza	2025–26	Serie B	0	0	0	0	0	0	0	0
Monza	2026–27	Serie A	0	0	0	0	—		0	0
Monza	Monza total		9	0	3	0	0	0	12	0
Career total			135	0	8	0	4	0	147	0
