= Stefano Turati =

Italian footballer (born 2001)

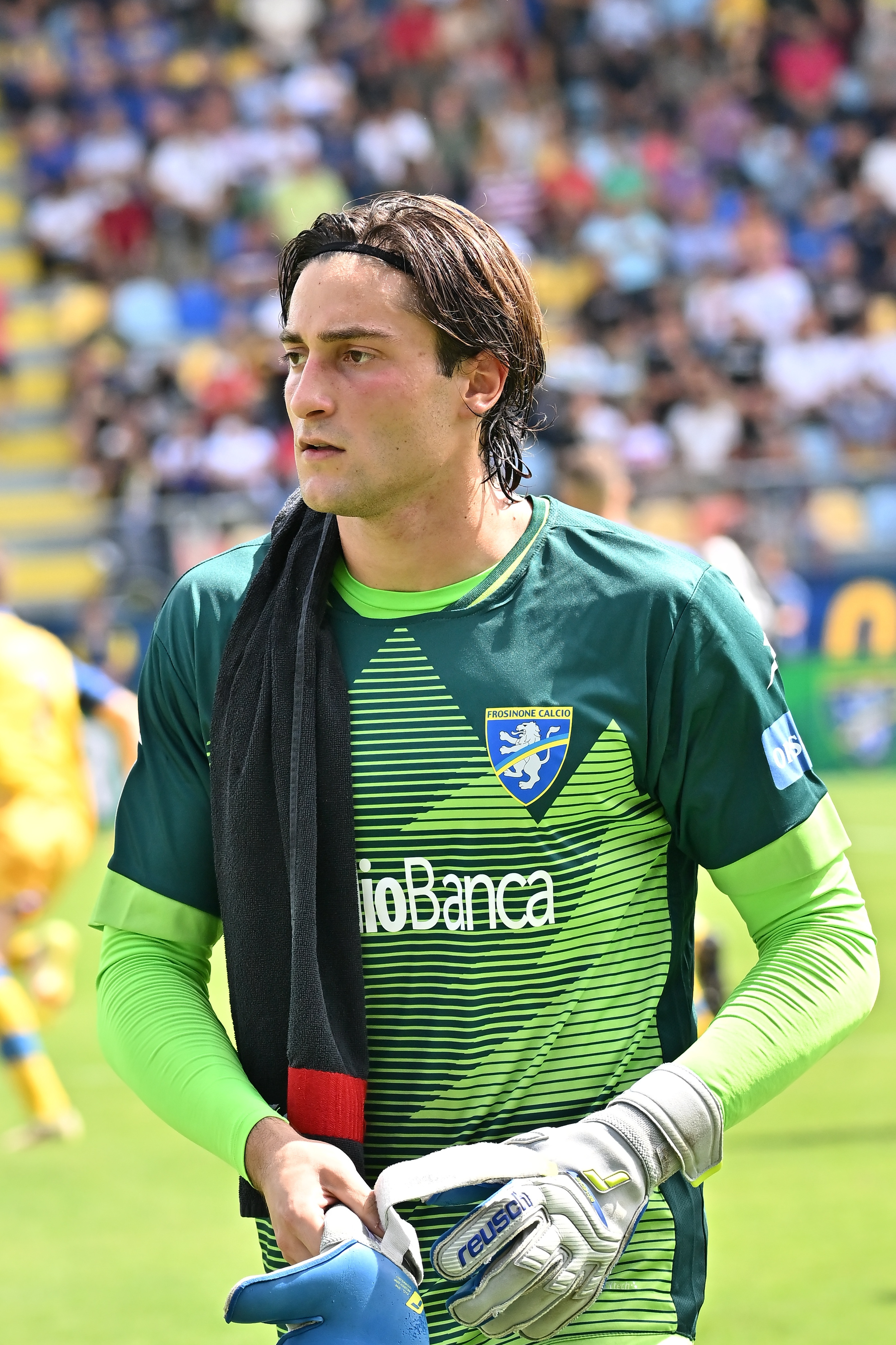
- Turati with Frosinone in 2022

Personal information
- Date of birth: 5 September 2001 (age 25)
- Place of birth: Milan, Italy
- Height: 1.91 m (6 ft 3 in)
- Position: Goalkeeper

Team information
- Current team: Sassuolo
- Number: 80

Youth career
- –2017: Inter Milan
- 2017–2018: Renate
- 2018–: Sassuolo

Senior career*
Years	Team	Apps	(Gls)
2017–2018	Renate	0	(0)
2019–	Sassuolo	8	(0)
2021–2022	→ Reggina (loan)	22	(0)
2022–2024	→ Frosinone (loan)	68	(0)
2024–2025	→ Monza (loan)	30	(0)

International career^{‡}
2020	Italy U19	1	(0)
2021	Italy U20	2	(0)
2021–2023	Italy U21	4	(0)
- * Club domestic league appearances and goals as of 25 May 2026 ‡ National team caps and goals as of 27 March 2023

Stefano Turati (born 5 September 2001) is an Italian professional footballer who plays as a goalkeeper for Serie A club Sassuolo.

== Club career ==
Starting his youth career at Inter Milan, Turati moved to Serie C side Renate in 2017, where he played both in the youth team and as a third-choice goalkeeper in the senior team. Without making his first team debut, Turati moved to Serie A side Sassuolo the following year, where he played as the main goalkeeper in the youth team. On 1 December 2019, aged 18, Turati made his professional debut against Juventus in the league, in a 2–2 draw away from home.

On 13 July 2021, he joined Reggina on a season-long loan. On 4 July 2022, Turati moved on loan to Frosinone. He joined Monza on a one-year loan on 23 August 2024.

== International career ==
On 8 October 2021 he made his debut with the Italy U21 squad, playing as a starter in the qualifying match won 2–1 against Bosnia and Herzegovina in Zenica.

== Career statistics ==
=== Club ===
As of match played on 2 November 2026

Appearances and goals by club, season and competition
Club	Season	League			Cup		Total	
Club	Season	Division	Apps	Goals	Apps	Goals	Apps	Goals
Renate	2017–18	Serie C	0	0	0	0	0	0
Sassuolo	2019–20	Serie A	2	0	0	0	2	0
Sassuolo	2020–21	Serie A	0	0	0	0	0	0
Sassuolo	2025–26	Serie A	4	0	2	0	6	0
Sassuolo	2026–27	Serie A	3	0	1	0	4	0
Sassuolo	Total		9	0	3	0	12	0
Reggina (loan)	2021–22	Serie B	22	0	0	0	22	0
Frosinone (loan)	2022–23	Serie B	37	0	1	0	38	0
Frosinone (loan)	2023–24	Serie A	31	0	1	0	32	0
Frosinone (loan)	Total		68	0	2	0	70	0
Monza (loan)	2024–25	Serie A	30	0	0	0	30	0
Career total			129	0	5	0	134	0
