= Luca Ravanelli =

Italian footballer

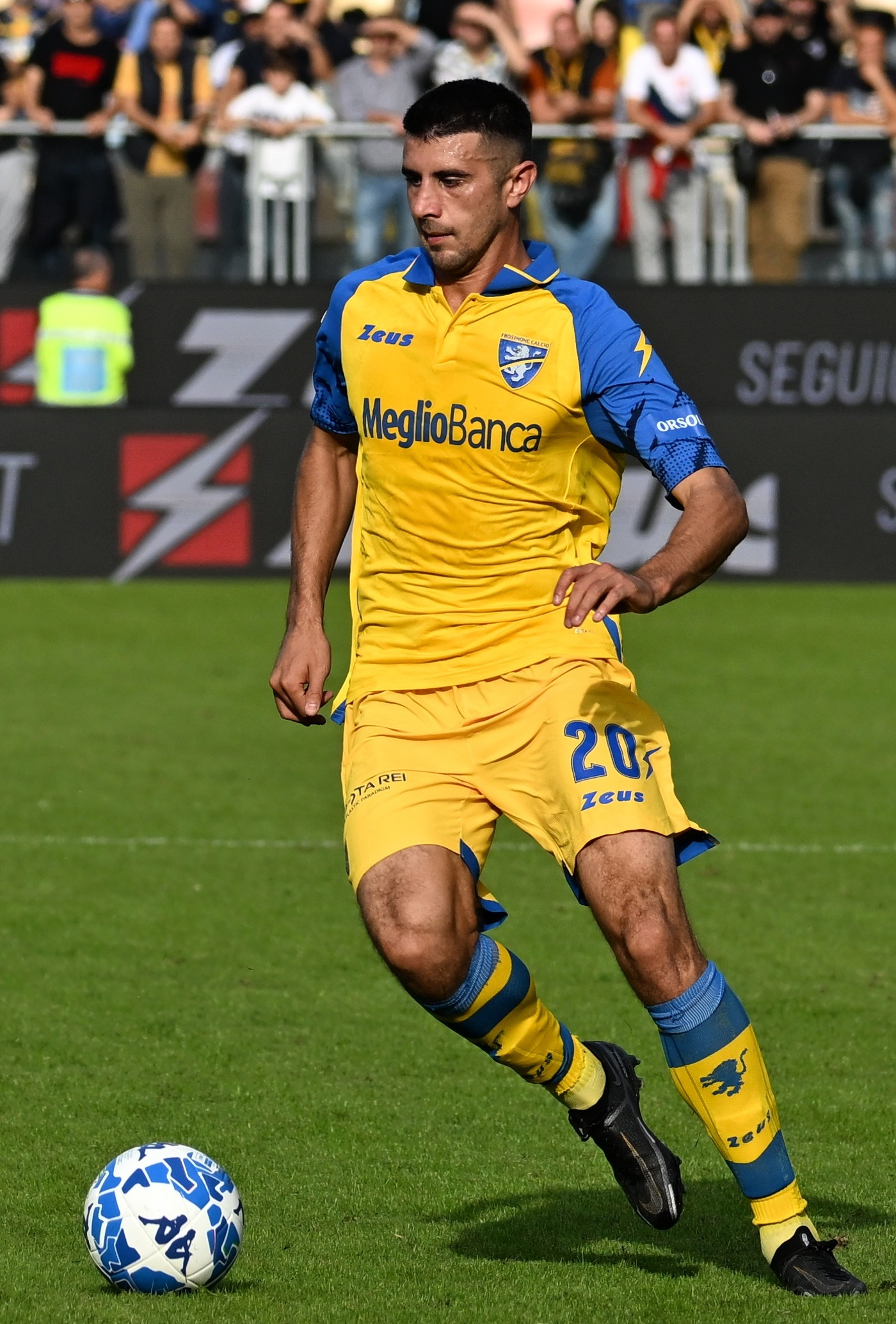
- Ravanelli with Frosinone in 2022

Personal information
- Date of birth: 6 January 1997 (age 29)
- Place of birth: Trento, Italy
- Height: 1.90 m (6 ft 3 in)
- Position: Defender

Team information
- Current team: Sampdoria
- Number: 13

Youth career
- –2015: Parma
- 2015–2017: Sassuolo

Senior career*
Years	Team	Apps	(Gls)
2015	Parma	0	(0)
2017–2021	Sassuolo	0	(0)
2017–2018	→ Padova (loan)	17	(1)
2018–2019	→ Padova (loan)	16	(2)
2019–2021	→ Cremonese (loan)	50	(1)
2021–2025	Cremonese	72	(2)
2022–2023	→ Frosinone (loan)	24	(0)
2025–2026	Monza	29	(2)
2026–	Sampdoria	0	(0)
- * Club domestic league appearances and goals as of 12 May 2026

Luca Ravanelli (born 6 January 1997) is an Italian professional footballer who plays as a defender for Serie B club Sampdoria.

== Career ==
=== Sassuolo ===
Born in Trento, Ravanelli was a youth exponent of Sassuolo.

==== Loan to Padova ====
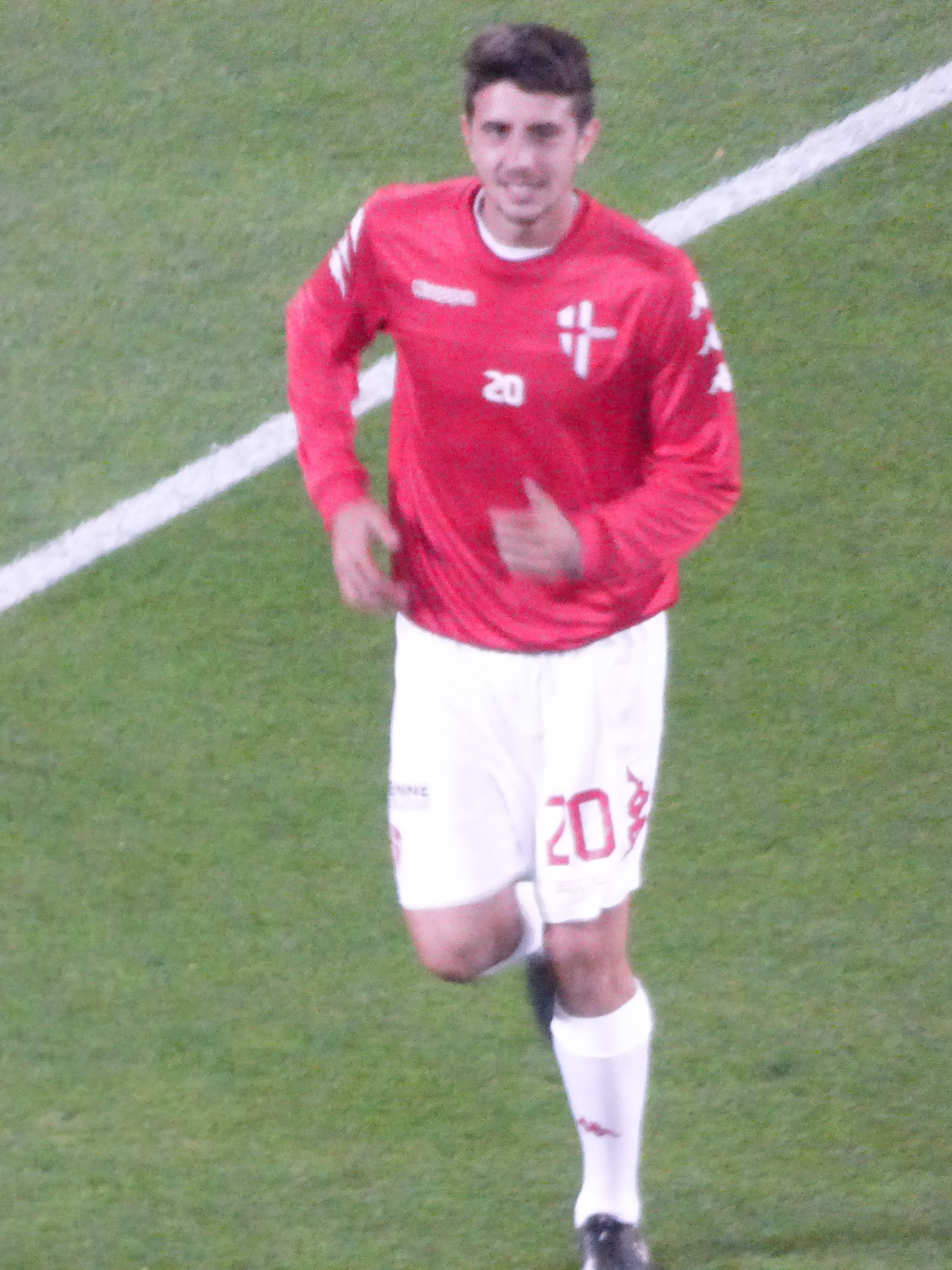
Ravanelli with Padova in October 2018

On 14 July 2017, Ravanelli was loaned to Serie C side Padova on a season-long loan deal. On 30 July he made his debut for Padova in a 2–1 home win, after extra-time, over Rende in the first round of Coppa Italia, he played the entire match. On 8 October he made his Serie C debut as a substitute replacing Alessandro Capello in the 81st minute of a 3–1 home win over Südtirol. On 25 November, Ravanelli played his first entire match for Padova, a 2–1 away win over AlbinoLeffe. On 12 March 2018 he scored his first professional goal in the 49th minute of a 2–1 away win over Bassano Virtus. On 12 May he scored his second goal in the 79th minute of a 5–1 home win over Livorno in the Supercoppa di Serie C. Ravanelli ended his loan to Padova with the Serie C title, 20 appearances and 2 goals.

On 7 July 2018 he returned to Padova with another season-long loan. On 5 August he started his season at Padova with a 1–0 home win over Monza in the second round of Coppa Italia, he played the entire match. Three weeks later, on 26 August, he made his Serie B debut and he scored his first goal of the season in the 36th minute of a 1–1 away draw against Hellas Verona. One more week later, on 1 September, he scored his second goal in the 40th minute of a 1–0 home win over Venezia. Ravanelli ended his second season on loan to Padova with 18 appearances, including 16 of them as a starter, and 2 goals.

==== Loan to Cremonese ====
On 9 July 2019, Ravanelli joined to Serie B side Cremonese on loan with an option to buy. On 11 August he made his debut for the team in a 4–0 home win over Virtus Francavilla in the second round of Coppa Italia, he played the entire match. Two weeks later, on 24 August, he made his Serie B debut for Cremonese in a 2–1 away win over Venezia, he played the entire match. On 3 March 2020, Ravnelli scored his first goal in Serie B in the 27th minute of a 3–2 home defeat against Empoli. Ravanelli ended his season-long loan to Cremonese with 32 appearances, including 30 of them as a tarter and scoring one goal.

On 1 September 2020, he returned on loan to Cremonese until 30 June 2021. On 4 October, Ravanelli made his seasonal debut for the club as a starter in a 1–1 away draw against Pisa, he played the entire match.

=== Cremonese ===
On 7 July 2021, he moved to Cremonese on a permanent basis. On 26 August 2022, Ravanelli joined Frosinone on loan.

=== Monza ===
On 11 August 2025, Ravanelli signed with Monza for two seasons, with an automatic extension clause, conditional on performance.

== Personal life ==
It has been mistakenly reported in some sources that Luca is a son of Fabrizio Ravanelli. According to Luca, he is not.

== Career statistics ==
As of 20 December 2020

Appearances and goals by club, season and competition
Club	Season	League			Cup		Europe		Other		Total	
Club	Season	League	Apps	Goals	Apps	Goals	Apps	Goals	Apps	Goals	Apps	Goals
Padova (loan)	2017–18	Serie C	17	1	1	0	—		2 (Note: All appearances in Supercoppa di Serie C)	1	20	2
Padova (loan)	2018–19	Serie B	16	2	2	0	—		—		18	2
Padova (loan)	Total		33	3	3	0	0	0	2	1	38	4
Cremonese (loan)	2019–20	Serie B	30	1	2	0	—		—		32	1
Cremonese (loan)	2020–21	Serie B	7	0	0	0	—		—		7	0
Cremonese (loan)	Total		37	1	2	0	0	0	0	0	39	1
Career total			70	4	5	0	0	0	2	1	77	5

== Honours ==
Padova

- Serie C: 2017–18
- Supercoppa di Serie C: 2018
