= Paulo Azzi =

Brazilian footballer (born 1994)

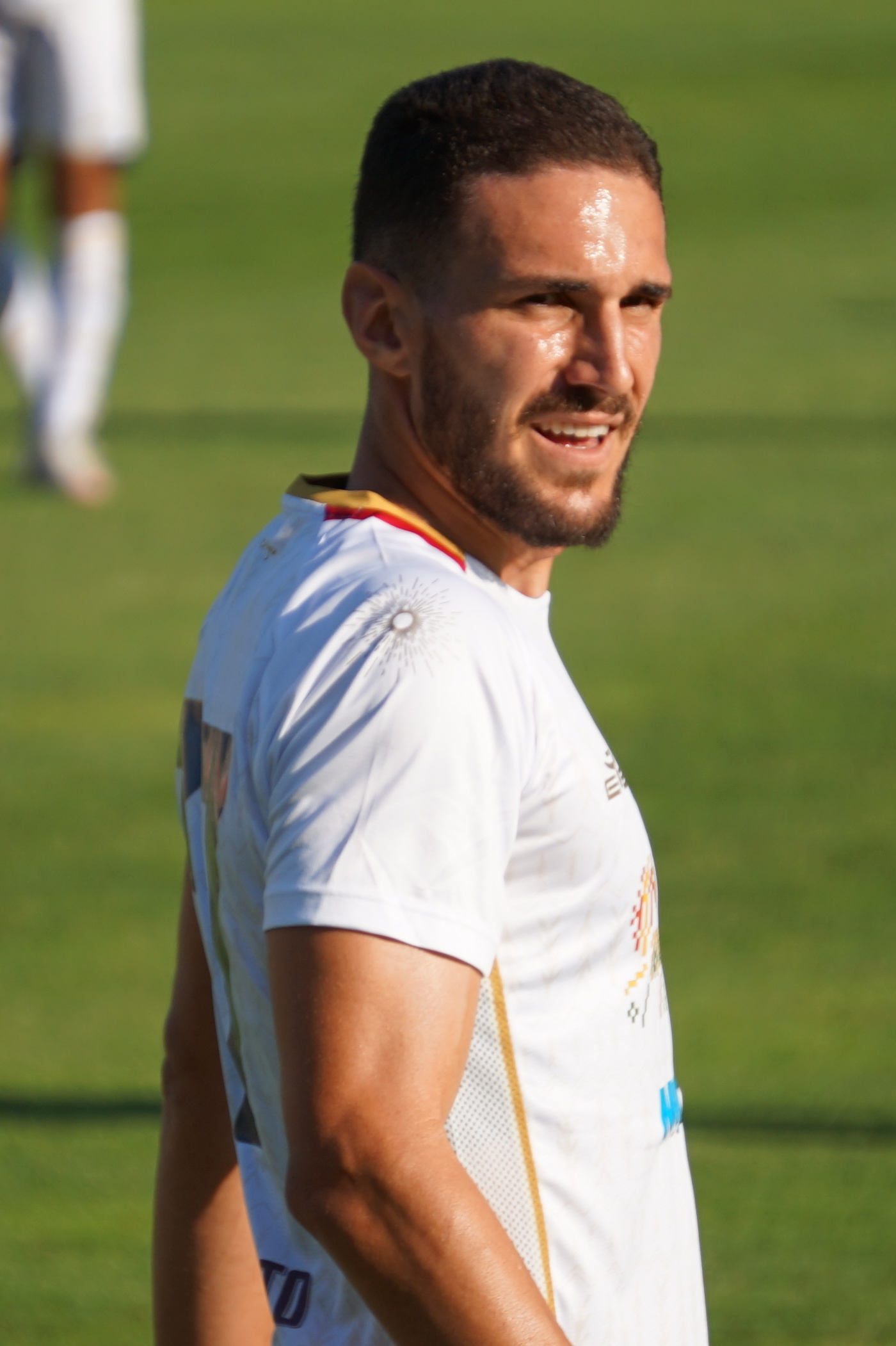
- Azzi with Cagliari in 2024

Personal information
- Full name: Paulo Daniel Dentello Azzi
- Date of birth: 15 July 1994 (age 32)
- Place of birth: Bragança Paulista, São Paulo, Brazil
- Height: 1.88 m (6 ft 2 in)
- Positions: Left-back; winger

Team information
- Current team: Modena
- Number: 27

Youth career
- 2008–2013: Paulista
- 2014: Cittadella

Senior career*
Years	Team	Apps	(Gls)
2013	Paulista	0	(0)
2014	Cittadella	4	(1)
2014–2018	Tombense	0	(0)
2015	→ Spezia (loan)	1	(0)
2016	→ Pavia (loan)	6	(0)
2016	→ Pordenone (loan)	7	(1)
2017	→ Siracusa (loan)	18	(4)
2017–2018	→ Bisceglie (loan)	34	(3)
2018–2020	Pro Vercelli	52	(2)
2020–2021	Seregno	14	(1)
2021	Lecco	17	(2)
2021–2022	Modena	50	(6)
2023–2025	Cagliari	47	(2)
2025	Cremonese	16	(3)
2025–2026	Monza	34	(5)
2026–	Modena	1	(0)
- * Club domestic league appearances and goals as of 22 August 2026

Paulo Daniel Dentello Azzi (born 15 July 1994) is a Brazilian professional footballer who plays as a left-back or a winger for Serie B club Modena.

== Early life ==
Azzi has Italian origins on both sides of his family. His paternal great-grandfather emigrated from Ceneselli, Veneto, to Brazil, while his maternal grandmother, who also moved to Brazil, was born in the province of Salerno, Campania.

== Career ==
Born in Bragança Paulista, São Paulo, Azzi joined Paulista's youth setup in 2008, aged 13. In July 2013 he was promoted to the first-team ahead of that year's Copa Paulista. He also appeared three times in the competition, all from the bench.

On 31 January 2014, Azzi joined Serie B side Cittadella. On 15 March, he made his professional debut, starting and assisting Juan Surraco in the winner against Carpi at Pier Cesare Tombolato. Seven days later he scored his first professional goal, netting his side's second of a 4–0 routing at Padova.

On 11 July 2020, he moved to Serie D club Seregno.

On 1 February 2021, he returned to Serie C and signed with Lecco.

On 3 July 2021, Azzi signed a two-year contract with fellow Serie C side Modena. He made his debut on 6 September in a 1–1 league draw against Reggiana as a late substitute for Alessandro Marotta. On 31 October, he scored his first goal for the club in the injury time of a 2–0 home win over Carrarese. The Brazilian eventually contributed to Modena's direct promotion to Serie B after six years.

After spending the first half of the 2022–23 season as a regular starter at Modena, on 12 January 2023 Azzi officially joined fellow Serie B club Cagliari for an undisclosed fee, signing a contract until June 2025, with an option for another year. He subsequently made his debut two days later, starting and scoring a goal in a 2–0 league win against Como.

On 22 January 2025, Azzi moved to Cremonese in Serie B on a one-and-a-half-year contract.

On 11 August 2025, Azzi signed with Monza for two seasons, with an automatic extension clause, conditional on performance.
