= Stadio Brianteo =

Stadium in Monza, Italy

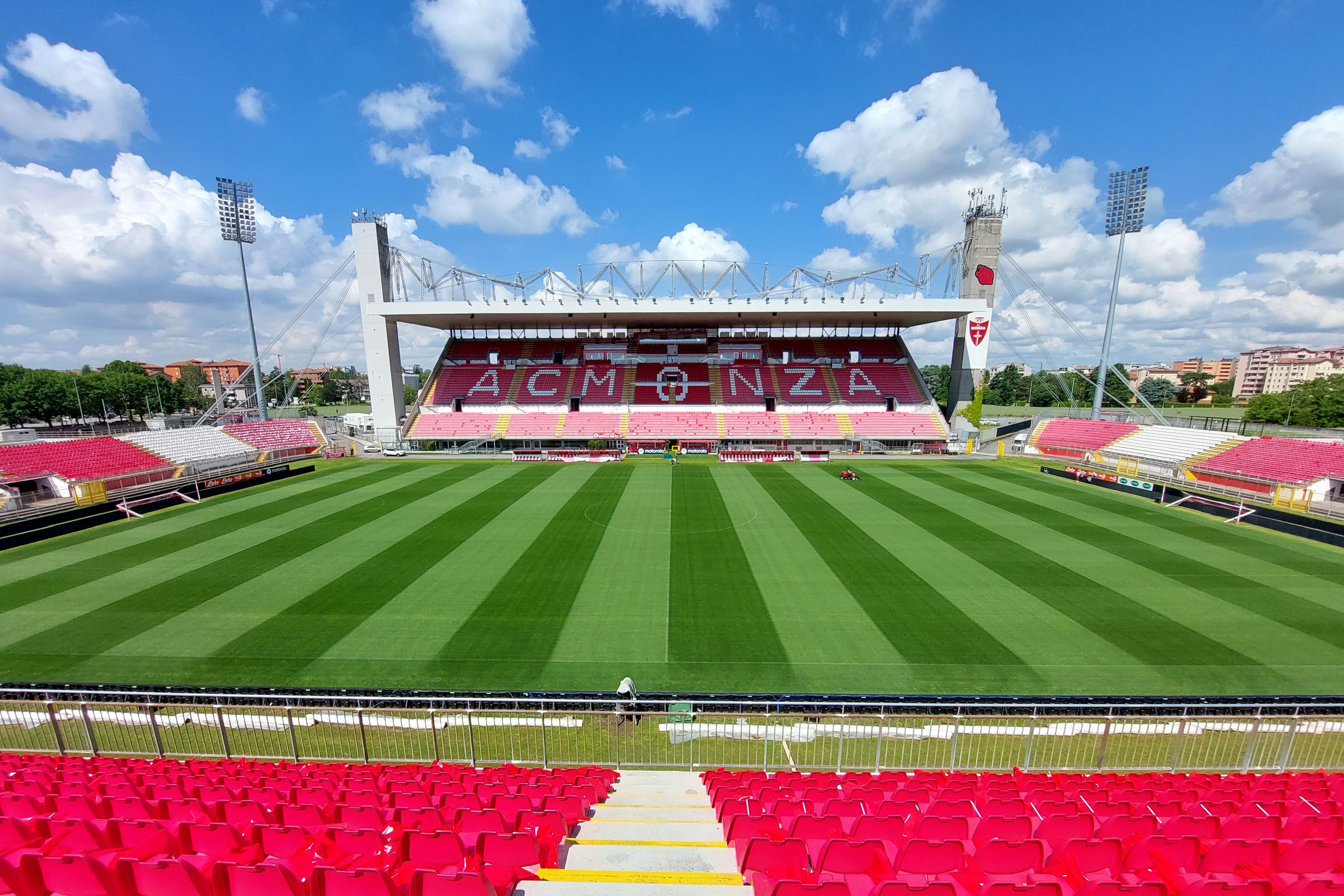
- Interactive map of Stadio Brianteo
- Former names: U-Power Stadium (2020–2026)
- Address: Via Franco Tognini 4, 20900
- Location: Monza, Italy
- Coordinates: 45°34′58″N 9°18′29″E
- Owner: Municipality of Monza
- Operator: AC Monza
- Capacity: 17,102
- Surface: Grass
- Record attendance: 17,015 vs Catanzaro (29 May 2026, Serie B play-off)
- Field size: 105 m × 68 m (344 ft × 223 ft)

Construction
- Groundbreaking: 1982
- Opened: 1988
- Project manager: Giorgio Battistoni

Tenants
- Monza (1988–present); Renate (2010–2011); Tritium (2011–2013); Giana Erminio (2014–2015); AC Milan Women (2019–2020); Aironi Rugby (2011); Inter Milan U23 (2025–2026); Inter Milan Women (2026–present)

Stadio Brianteo is a multi-purpose stadium in Monza, Italy, and the home of AC Monza. Mostly used for football matches, the stadium was built in 1988 and has a capacity of 17,102. The stadium is also used for rugby matches, concerts and other events.

The stadium was known as the U-Power Stadium between 2020 and 2026 for sponsorship reasons.

== History ==
Stadio Brianteo, located on the north-eastern outskirts of Monza, was built as a replacement for the Stadio Gino Alfonso Sada, located in the city center near the station. The construction works started after a long debate and lasted a long time due to the technical difficulties in the construction of the structure that supports the coverage of the grandstand and the changes to the project in progress. Initially an athletics track was planned, but it was eliminated during the works.

The stadium was inaugurated on 28 August 1988 during the Coppa Italia match against Roma, which ended with a score of 2–1 for Monza, with goals by Casiraghi, Giannini, and Mancuso.

On 4 September 2020, the stadium became known commercially as the U-Power Stadium for the 2020–21 Serie B season.

== Events ==
=== Rugby ===
In 2016, the stadium held the 2017 Rugby League World Cup Qualifier between Italy and Wales.

=== Concerts ===
Michael Jackson performed, on two consecutive nights, at the stadium during his Dangerous World Tour on 6–7 July 1992 in front of 46,000 people.

Elton John performed at the Brianteo during his The One Tour, on 10 July 1992.

== See also ==
- List of football stadiums in Italy
- Lists of stadiums
