= 2026–27 Inter Milan Under-23 season =

Inter Milan Under-23
2026–27 season
- Chairman: Giuseppe Marotta
- Head coach: Stefano Vecchi
- Stadium: Stadio Ernesto Breda
- Serie C: 7th
- Coppa Italia Serie C: First round
- Top goalscorer: Jan Żuberek (6)
- Biggest win: 4–0 v Giugliano; 13 October 2026 (Serie C)
- Biggest defeat: 1–4 v Picerno; 7 September 2026 (Serie C)
Home colours	Away colours	Third colours
- All statistics correct as of 1 November 2026.

The 2025–26 season is the second season in the existence of Inter Milan Under-23, Inter Milan's reserve team, set to be played in Serie C, the third tier of Italian football. In addition to the domestic league, Inter U23 will participate in this season's edition of the Coppa Italia Serie C.

== Players ==
As of 1 November 2026

Note: Flags indicate national team as defined under FIFA eligibility rules; some limited exceptions apply. Players may hold more than one non-FIFA nationality.

No.	Pos.	Nation	Player
1	GK	ITA	Riccardo Melgrati
2	DF	ITA	Tommaso Avitabile
3	DF	ITA	Mattia Marello
4	MF	ITA	Filippo Cerpelletti
5	DF	ITA	Lorenzo Tosto (on loan from Empoli)
6	MF	BRA	Charlys (on loan from Hellas Verona)
7	MF	POL	Iwo Kaczmarski
8	MF	ITA	Luca Fiordilino
9	FW	ITA	Jamal Iddrissou
10	FW	ITA	Richi Agbonifo
11	FW	POL	Jan Żuberek
14	MF	ITA	Leonardo Bovo
15	DF	ITA	Francesco Stante
16	MF	ITA	Matteo Venturini
19	DF	ITA	Giuseppe Prestia (captain)

No.	Pos.	Nation	Player
22	GK	ALB	Alain Taho
24	DF	ITA	Gabriele Re Cecconi
27	DF	ITA	Mike Aidoo
29	MF	ITA	Matias Mancuso
30	FW	ITA	Mattia Mosconi
45	FW	ITA	Matteo Lavelli
71	GK	ITA	Alessandro Calligaris
75	DF	ITA	Leonardo Bovio
77	DF	ITA	Igor Amerighi
78	DF	VEN	Alessandro Milani
80	DF	ITA	Gabriele Garonetti
86	DF	CRO	Leon Jakirović
95	GK	ITA	Paolo Raimondi
99	FW	ITA	Tommaso Fumagalli

=== Inter Primavera ===
Inter Primavera players that received an official call-up to the Under-23 squad.

Note: Flags indicate national team as defined under FIFA eligibility rules; some limited exceptions apply. Players may hold more than one non-FIFA nationality.

No.	Pos.	Nation	Player
20	FW	ITA	Thomas Matarrese
21	DF	ITA	Edoardo Rocca
23	DF	ITA	Andrea Donato
28	FW	MAR	Anas El Mahboubi
32	FW	ITA	Mirko Franchi

No.	Pos.	Nation	Player
37	DF	ITA	Davide Sorino
38	MF	ITA	Giovanni D'Agostino
40	GK	ITA	Carlo Galliera
91	FW	ITA	Cristian Carrara

== Transfers ==
=== In ===
Date	Pos.	Player	Moving from	Fee	Notes	Ref.
Summer
30 June 2026	GK	(Italy) Matteo Zamarian	(Italy) Pro Patria	N/A	Loan return	
30 June 2026	DF	(Italy) Mike Aidoo	(Italy) Pergolettese	N/A	Loan return	
30 June 2026	DF	(Italy) Matteo Motta	(Italy) Lumezzane	N/A	Loan return	
1 July 2026	MF	(Poland) Iwo Kaczmarski	(Italy) Empoli	Undisclosed	From loan to permanent transfer	
23 July 2026	GK	(Latvia) Roberts Apsits	(Italy) Virtus Francavilla	Undisclosed		
24 July 2026	DF	(Venezuela) Alessandro Milani	(Italy) Lazio	Undisclosed		
25 August 2026	FW	(Italy) Tommaso Fumagalli	(Italy) Como	Undisclosed		
29 August 2026	MF	(Brazil) Charlys	(Italy) Hellas Verona	N/A	Loan with option to buy	
1 September 2026	DF	(Italy) Lorenzo Tosto	(Italy) Empoli	N/A	Loan with option to buy	

=== Out ===
Date	Pos.	Player	Moving to	Fee	Notes	Ref.
Summer
30 June 2026	DF	(Italy) Simone Cinquegrano	(Italy) Sassuolo	N/A	End of loan	
30 June 2026	DF	(Romania) Antonio David	(Italy) Cesena	N/A	End of loan	
30 June 2026	MF	(Poland) Iwo Kaczmarski	(Italy) Empoli	N/A	End of loan	
30 June 2026	FW	(Italy) Antonino La Gumina	(Italy) Sampdoria	N/A	End of loan	
8 July 2026	DF	(Greece) Christos Alexiou	(Greece) AEK Athens	N/A	Loan with option to buy and counter-option	
12 July 2026	FW	(Italy) Matteo Spinaccè	(Italy) Mantova	N/A	Loan with option to buy and counter-option	
15 July 2026	DF	(Italy) Tommaso Della Mora	(Italy) Grosseto	Undisclosed		
21 July 2026	GK	(Italy) Matteo Zamarian	(Italy) Pro Sesto	N/A	On loan	
22 July 2026	DF	(Italy) Matteo Cocchi	(Italy) Padova	N/A	Loan with option to buy and counter-option	
23 July 2026	GK	(Latvia) Roberts Apsits	(Italy) Campobasso	N/A	Loan with option to buy and counter-option	
3 August 2026	MF	(Spain) Dilan Zárate	(Spain) Cádiz	N/A	Loan with option to buy and counter-option	
10 August 2026	FW	(Morocco) Aymen Zouin	(Italy) Parma	Undisclosed	Inter will retain a buy-back clause	
14 August 2026	DF	(Italy) Matteo Motta	(Italy) Pescara	Undisclosed		
17 August 2026	MF	(Italy) Thomas Berenbruch	(Italy) Avellino	N/A	Loan with option to buy and counter-option	
25 August 2026	DF	(France) Yvan Maye	(Italy) Monza	N/A	Loan with option to buy and counter-option	
26 August 2026	MF	(Italy) Mattia Zanchetta	(Italy) Giana Erminio	N/A	On loan	
27 August 2026	MF	(Slovenia) Luka Topalović	(Italy) Carrarese	N/A	Loan with option to buy and counter-option	
1 September 2026	MF	(France) Issiaka Kamate	(Spain) Atlético Madrid	€1.7M + 30% sell-on	Inter will a €8.0M buy-back clause	

== Pre-season and friendlies ==
22 July 2026 Friendly	Inter Milan U23	15–0	Grosio	Livigno
17:00 CEST (UTC+2)	Agbonifo 14', 17', 29'; Carrara 19'; Prestia 22'; Stante 32'; Mancuso 46', 58', 60'; Zanchetta 61'; Amerighi 67'; Motta 70'; Matarrese 73'; Żuberek 78', 81'	Report		Stadium: Centro Sportivo Acquagranda; Referee: Lorenzo Beretta

26 July 2026 Friendly	Novara	2–1	Inter Milan U23	Borgomanero
17:30 CEST (UTC+2)	Lorenzini 70'; Graziani 82'	Report	Amerighi 1'	Stadium: Stadio Comunale di Borgomanero; Referee: Pietro Miletto

2 August 2026 Friendly	AlbinoLeffe	1–2	Inter Milan U23	Zanica
17:30 CEST (UTC+2)	De Paoli 84' (pen.)	Report	Franchi 48'; Agbonifo 55'	Stadium: AlbinoLeffe Stadium; Referee: Thomas Manzini

5 August 2025 Friendly	Lecco	0–3	Inter Milan U23	Lecco
18:00 CEST (UTC+2)		Report	Żuberek 14', 18'; Matarrese 88'	Stadium: Stadio Rigamonti-Ceppi; Referee: Daniele Dell'Oro

9 August 2026 Friendly	Pergolettese	0–0	Inter Milan U23	Crema
18:00 CEST (UTC+2)		Report		Stadium: Centro Sportivo Bertolotti; Referee: Marco Costa

== Competitions ==
=== Overview ===
Competition	First match	Last match	Starting round	Final position	Record							
Competition	First match	Last match	Starting round	Final position	Pld	W	D	L	GF	GA	GD	Win %
Serie C	23 August 2026	25 April 2027	Matchday 1	TBD	14	7	2	5	24	21	+3	50.00
Coppa Italia Serie C	14 August 2026		First round	First round	1	0	1	0	1	1	+0	0.00
Total					15	7	3	5	25	22	+3	46.67

Last updated: 21 November 2026
Source: Soccerway

=== Serie C ===
==== League table ====
2026–27 Serie C, Group C
Pos	Team	Pld	W	D	L	GF	GA	GD	Pts	Promotion or relegation
6	Audace Cerignola	13	6	2	5	20	15	+5	20	Qualification for the group play-offs first round
7	Monopoli	14	5	5	4	14	11	+3	20	Qualification for the group play-offs first round
8	Inter Milan U23	13	6	2	5	22	20	+2	20	Qualification for the group play-offs first round
9	Casertana	14	5	5	4	18	17	+1	20	Qualification for the group play-offs first round
10	Cavese	14	5	4	5	24	22	+2	19	Qualification for the group play-offs first round

Updated to match(es) played on 19 November 2026. Source: Lega Pro
Rules for classification: 1) Points; 2) Head-to-head points; 3) Head-to-head goal difference; 4) Goal difference; 5) Goals scored; 6) Lower goals against; 7) Wins; 8) Lower losses; 9) Away wins; 10) Lower home losses.
(Note: Head-to-head record is used only after all the matches between the teams in question have been played)

==== Results summary ====
Overall								Home						Away					
Pld	W	D	L	GF	GA	GD	Pts	W	D	L	GF	GA	GD	W	D	L	GF	GA	GD
14	7	2	5	24	21	+3	23	4	2	2	14	13	+1	3	0	3	10	8	+2

Last updated: 21 November 2026.
Source: Soccerway

==== Results by round ====
Round	1	2	3	4	5	6	9	7^{1}	10	11	8^{2}	12	13	15	14^{3}	16	17	18	19	20	21	22	23	24	25	26	27	28	29	30	31	32	33	34	35	36	37	38
Ground	A	H	A	H	A	H	A	A	H	H	H	A	H	H	A	A	H	A	H	H	A	H	A	H	A	H	A	H	A	A	H	A	H	A	H	A	H	A
Result	W	D	L	L	W	W	L	W	L	D	W	L	W	W																								
Position	5	6	11	15	9	6	14	7	11	11	7	9	7																									

Updated to match(es) played on 21 November 2026. Source: Soccerway
A = Away; H = Home; W = Win; D = Draw; L = Loss

^{1} Matchday 7 (vs Giugliano) originally scheduled for 27 September 2026 was postponed to 13 October 2026 due to international break.

^{2} Matchday 8 (vs Scafatese) originally scheduled for 3 October 2026 was postponed to 27 October 2026 due to international break.

^{3} Matchday 14 (vs Audace Cerignola) originally scheduled for 14 November 2026 was postponed to 25 November 2026 due to international break.

==== Matches ====
The league schedule was released on 30 July 2026.

23 August 2026 1	Catania	1–2	Inter Milan U23	Catania
18:00 CEST (UTC+2)	Russo 65'; Di Tacchio (yellow card) 86'	Report	Maye 39', (yellow card) 45+4'; Mosconi 45+2' (pen.); Stante (yellow card) 89'	Stadium: Stadio Angelo Massimino; Referee: Bruno Spina

29 August 2026 2	Inter Milan U23	1–1	Team Altamura	Sesto San Giovanni
21:00 CEST (UTC+2)	Kaczmarski (yellow card) 6'; Bovio (yellow card) 23'; Mosconi 50' (pen.); Marello (yellow card) 89'	Report	Grande 36'; Ovalle (yellow card) 88'; Peschetola (yellow card) 90+1'	Stadium: Stadio Ernesto Breda; Referee: Ciro Aldi

7 September 2026 3	Picerno	4–1	Inter Milan U23	Picerno
21:00 CEST (UTC+2)	Pugliese (yellow card) 33'; Abreu 37'; Virgilio 40'; Kanouté 81', 90+5'; Maselli (red card) 90+11'; Bellodi (yellow card) 90+12'	Report	Bovo (yellow card) 13'; Agbonifo 72'; Fumagalli (yellow card) 89'; Bovio (red card) 90+2'; Żuberek (yellow card) 90+12'	Stadium: Stadio Donato Curcio; Referee: Leonardo Di Mario

12 September 2026 4	Inter Milan U23	2–3	Casertana	Sesto San Giovanni
15:00 CEST (UTC+2)	Bovo (yellow card) 44'; Lavelli (yellow card) 45'; Henin 58' (o.g.); Mosconi 88'	Report	Martino (yellow card) 42'; Henin 45+1'; Castelli 68'; Manconi 79'	Stadium: Stadio Ernesto Breda; Referee: Alessandro Silvestri

15 September 2026 5	Crotone	0–2	Inter Milan U23	Crotone
18:30 CEST (UTC+2)	Groppelli (red card) 32'; Tanco (yellow card) 87'	Report	Jakirović (yellow card) 55'; Lavelli (yellow card) 60', (goal) 89'; Mancuso 67'	Stadium: Stadio Ezio Scida; Referee: Gabriele Totaro

20 September 2026 6	Inter Milan U23	3–2	Foggia	Sesto San Giovanni
15:00 CEST (UTC+2)	Milani 5'; Fumagalli 45+2'; Avitabile 63'; Kaczmarski (yellow card) 90+2'	Report	Merdji 3'; Gallo (yellow card) 20'; Panico (yellow card) 76'; Ravasio 90+4'	Stadium: Stadio Ernesto Breda; Referee: Andrea Mazzer

10 October 2026 9	Savoia	2–1	Inter Milan U23	Torre Annunziata
14:30 CEST (UTC+2)	Meola 11'; Scotti 52'; Alfieri (yellow card) 79'	Report	Bovo 58', (yellow card) 73'; Fumagalli (yellow card) 60'; Tosto (yellow card) 71'	Stadium: Stadio Alfredo Giraud; Referee: Cristiano Ursini

13 October 2026 7	Giugliano	0–4	Inter Milan U23	Giugliano in Campania
15:00 CEST (UTC+2)	Varone (yellow card) 35'; De Rosa (yellow card) 62'	Report	Avitabile (yellow card) 12'; Mosconi 76'; Cerpelletti (yellow card) 79'; Kaczmarski 84'; Żuberek 90+1', 90+3'	Stadium: Stadio Alberto De Cristofaro; Referee: Andrea Migliorini
Note: The match was originally scheduled for 27 September 2026.

17 October 2026 10	Inter Milan U23	2–4	Monopoli	Sesto San Giovanni
14:30 CEST (UTC+2)	Żuberek 7', 89'	Report	Vido 12' (pen.), 47'; Scipioni 25'; Fall 85'	Stadium: Stadio Ernesto Breda; Referee: Gabriele Restaldo

24 October 2026 11	Inter Milan U23	1–1	Sorrento	Sesto San Giovanni
14:30 CET (UTC+1)	Stante (yellow card) 52'; Żuberek 84', (yellow card) 89'	Report	Cargnelutti (yellow card) 43'; Starita 71'; Di Somma (yellow card) 76'; Parker (yellow card) 88'	Stadium: Stadio Ernesto Breda; Referee: Gabriele Sciolti

27 October 2026 8	Inter Milan U23	2–1	Scafatese	Sesto San Giovanni
14:30 CEST (UTC+2)	Garonetti (yellow card) 21'; Żuberek 36'; Marello 62'	Report	Palmieri 39'; Bacchetti (yellow card) 60'	Stadium: Stadio Ernesto Breda; Referee: Michele Maccorin
Note: The match was originally scheduled for 3 October 2026.

1 November 2026 12	Cosenza	1–0	Inter Milan U23	Cosenza
12:30 CET (UTC+1)	Dalmazzi 26'; Dametto (yellow card) 54'; Ndow (yellow card) 79'	Report		Stadium: Stadio San Vito-Gigi Marulla; Referee: Domenico Castellone

7 November 2026 13	Inter Milan U23	1–0	Salernitana	Sesto San Giovanni
14:30 CET (UTC+1)	Kaczmarski (yellow card) 14'; Charlys 41'; Aidoo (yellow card) 84'	Report	Villa (yellow card) 14'; Anastasio (yellow card) 25'	Stadium: Stadio Ernesto Breda; Referee: Alessandro Recchia

21 November 2026 15	Inter Milan U23	2–1	Potenza	Sesto San Giovanni
14:30 CET (UTC+1)	Marello 16'; Aidoo (yellow card) 31'; Żuberek (yellow card) 45'; Kaczmarski (yellow card) 70'; Agbonifo 85', (yellow card) 85'	Report	Selleri 23'; Bura (yellow card) 67'	Stadium: Stadio Ernesto Breda; Referee: Riccardo Tropiano

25 November 2026 14	Audace Cerignola	v	Inter Milan U23	Cerignola
14:30 CET (UTC+1)				Stadium: Stadio Domenico Monterisi
Note: The match was originally scheduled for 14 November 2026.

29 November 2026 16	Barletta	v	Inter Milan U23	Barletta
12:30 CET (UTC+1)				Stadium: Stadio Cosimo Puttilli

5 December 2026 17	Inter Milan U23	v	Bari	Sesto San Giovanni
14:30 CET (UTC+1)				Stadium: Stadio Ernesto Breda

12 December 2026 18	Cavese	v	Inter Milan U23	Cava de' Tirreni
14:30 CET (UTC+1)				Stadium: Stadio Simonetta Lamberti

20 December 2026 19	Inter Milan U23	v	Casarano	Sesto San Giovanni
12:30 CET (UTC+1)				Stadium: Stadio Ernesto Breda

3 January 2027 20	Inter Milan U23	v	Catania	Sesto San Giovanni
14:30 CET (UTC+1)				Stadium: Stadio Ernesto Breda

10 January 2027 21	Team Altamura	v	Inter Milan U23	Altamura
--:-- CET (UTC+1)				Stadium: Stadio Antonio D'Angelo

17 January 2027 22	Inter Milan U23	v	Picerno	Sesto San Giovanni
--:-- CET (UTC+1)				Stadium: Stadio Ernesto Breda

24 January 2027 23	Casertana	v	Inter Milan U23	Caserta
--:-- CET (UTC+1)				Stadium: Stadio Alberto Pinto

31 January 2027 24	Inter Milan U23	v	Crotone	Sesto San Giovanni
--:-- CET (UTC+1)				Stadium: Stadio Ernesto Breda

7 February 2027 25	Foggia	v	Inter Milan U23	Foggia
--:-- CET (UTC+1)				Stadium: Stadio Pino Zaccheria

10 February 2027 26	Inter Milan U23	v	Giugliano	Sesto San Giovanni
--:-- CET (UTC+1)				Stadium: Stadio Ernesto Breda

14 February 2027 27	Scafatese	v	Inter Milan U23	Scafati
--:-- CET (UTC+1)				Stadium: Stadio Giovanni Vitiello

21 February 2027 28	Inter Milan U23	v	Savoia	Sesto San Giovanni
--:-- CET (UTC+1)				Stadium: Stadio Ernesto Breda

28 February 2027 29	Monopoli	v	Inter Milan U23	Monopoli
--:-- CET (UTC+1)				Stadium: Stadio Vito Simone Veneziani

3 March 2027 30	Sorrento	v	Inter Milan U23	Sorrento
--:-- CET (UTC+1)				Stadium: Stadio Italia

7 March 2027 31	Inter Milan U23	v	Cosenza	Sesto San Giovanni
--:-- CET (UTC+1)				Stadium: Stadio Ernesto Breda

14 March 2027 32	Salernitana	v	Inter Milan U23	Salerno
--:-- CET (UTC+1)				Stadium: Stadio Arechi

21 March 2027 33	Inter Milan U23	v	Audace Cerignola	Sesto San Giovanni
--:-- CET (UTC+1)				Stadium: Stadio Ernesto Breda

27 March 2027 34	Potenza	v	Inter Milan U23	Potenza
--:-- CET (UTC+1)				Stadium: Stadio Alfredo Viviani

4 April 2027 35	Inter Milan U23	v	Barletta	Sesto San Giovanni
--:-- CEST (UTC+2)				Stadium: Stadio Ernesto Breda

11 April 2027 36	Bari	v	Inter Milan U23	Bari
--:-- CEST (UTC+2)				Stadium: Stadio San Nicola

18 April 2027 37	Inter Milan U23	v	Cavese	Sesto San Giovanni
--:-- CEST (UTC+2)				Stadium: Stadio Ernesto Breda

25 April 2027 38	Casarano	v	Inter Milan U23	Casarano
--:-- CEST (UTC+2)				Stadium: Stadio Giuseppe Capozza

=== Coppa Italia Serie C ===
16 August 2025 First round	Vado	1–1 (7–6 p)	Inter Milan U23	Sestri Levante
21:00 CEST (UTC+2)	Lionetti 18'; Dellepiane (yellow card) 40'; Saltarelli (yellow card) 42'	Report	Fiordilino (yellow card) 42'; Lavelli (penalty missed) 45'; Marello 45'	Stadium: Stadio Giuseppe Sivori; Referee: Cosimo Papi
	Penalties
	Vita (penalty missed); Piana (penalty scored); Ferro (penalty scored); Lionetti (penalty scored); Rosa (penalty scored); Tampieri (penalty scored); Malanca (penalty scored); Lazzarini (penalty scored)		(penalty scored) Marello; (penalty scored) Bovo; (penalty scored) Mosconi; (penalty missed) Żuberek; (penalty scored) Jakirović; (penalty scored) Fiordilino; (penalty scored) Stante; (penalty missed) Mancuso

== Statistics ==
As of match played 21 November 2026

=== Appearances and goals ===
No.	Pos	Nat	Player	Total		Serie C		Coppa Italia Serie C	
No.	Pos	Nat	Player	Apps	Goals	Apps	Goals	Apps	Goals
Goalkeepers
1	GK	(Italy) ITA	Riccardo Melgrati	13	0	12	0	1	0
22	GK	(Albania) ALB	Alain Taho	2	0	2	0	0	0
71	GK	(Italy) ITA	Alessandro Calligaris	0	0	0	0	0	0
95	GK	(Italy) ITA	Paolo Raimondi	0	0	0	0	0	0
Defenders
2	DF	(Italy) ITA	Tommaso Avitabile	7	1	7	1	0	0
3	DF	(Italy) ITA	Mattia Marello	13	3	11+1	2	0+1	1
5	DF	(Italy) ITA	Lorenzo Tosto	6	0	5+1	0	0	0
15	DF	(Italy) ITA	Francesco Stante	10	0	8+1	0	1	0
19	DF	(Italy) ITA	Giuseppe Prestia	9	0	7+1	0	1	0
21	DF	(Italy) ITA	Edoardo Rocca	1	0	0+1	0	0	0
23	DF	(Italy) ITA	Andrea Donato	5	0	3+2	0	0	0
24	DF	(Italy) ITA	Gabriele Re Cecconi	6	0	4+2	0	0	0
27	DF	(Italy) ITA	Mike Aidoo	5	0	2+3	0	0	0
37	DF	(Italy) ITA	Davide Sorino	4	0	0+4	0	0	0
75	DF	(Italy) ITA	Leonardo Bovio	6	0	6	0	0	0
77	DF	(Italy) ITA	Igor Amerighi	5	0	3+1	0	1	0
78	DF	(Venezuela) VEN	Alessandro Milani	4	1	2+1	1	1	0
80	DF	(Italy) ITA	Gabriele Garonetti	6	0	4+2	0	0	0
86	DF	(Croatia) CRO	Leon Jakirović	10	0	7+2	0	0+1	0
Midfielders
4	MF	(Italy) ITA	Filippo Cerpelletti	3	0	0+3	0	0	0
6	MF	(Brazil) BRA	Charlys	7	1	5+2	1	0	0
7	MF	(Poland) POL	Iwo Kaczmarski	15	1	13+1	1	1	0
8	MF	(Italy) ITA	Luca Fiordilino	12	0	10+1	0	1	0
14	MF	(Italy) ITA	Leonardo Bovo	14	1	5+8	1	0+1	0
16	MF	(Italy) ITA	Matteo Venturini	0	0	0	0	0	0
29	MF	(Italy) ITA	Matias Mancuso	12	1	9+2	1	1	0
Forwards
9	FW	(Italy) ITA	Jamal Iddrissou	4	0	2+2	0	0	0
10	FW	(Italy) ITA	Richi Agbonifo	8	2	1+6	2	1	0
11	FW	(Poland) POL	Jan Żuberek	14	6	4+9	6	0+1	0
28	FW	(Morocco) MAR	Anas El Mahboubi	1	0	0+1	0	0	0
30	FW	(Italy) ITA	Mattia Mosconi	10	4	6+3	4	0+1	0
45	FW	(Italy) ITA	Matteo Lavelli	11	1	8+2	1	1	0
91	FW	(Italy) ITA	Cristian Carrara	1	0	0+1	0	0	0
99	FW	(Italy) ITA	Tommaso Fumagalli	13	1	7+6	1	0	0
Players transferred out during the season
6	DF	(France) FRA	Yvan Maye	2	1	1	1	1	0

Source: Competitions

=== Goalscorers ===
Rank	No.	Pos.	Player	Serie C	Coppa Italia Serie C	Total
1	11	FW	(Poland) Jan Żuberek	6	0	6
2	30	FW	(Italy) Mattia Mosconi	4	0	4
3	3	DF	(Italy) Mattia Marello	2	1	3
4	10	FW	(Italy) Richi Agbonifo	2	0	2
5	2	DF	(Italy) Tommaso Avitabile	1	0	1
5	6	DF	(France) Yvan Maye	1	0	1
5	6	MF	(Brazil) Charlys	1	0	1
5	7	MF	(Poland) Iwo Kaczmarski	1	0	1
5	14	MF	(Italy) Leonardo Bovo	1	0	1
5	29	MF	(Italy) Matias Mancuso	1	0	1
5	45	FW	(Italy) Matteo Lavelli	1	0	1
5	78	DF	(Venezuela) Alessandro Milani	1	0	1
5	99	FW	(Italy) Tommaso Fumagalli	1	0	1
Own goals				1	0	1
Totals				24	1	25

=== Clean sheets ===
Rank	No.	Player	Serie C	Coppa Italia Serie C	Total
1	1	(Italy) Riccardo Melgrati	2	0	2
2	22	(Albania) Alain Taho	1	0	1
Totals			3	0	3

=== Disciplinary record ===
No.	Pos.	Player	Serie C			Coppa Italia Serie C			Total		
No.	Pos.	Player	Yellow card	(yellow card) (yellow-red card)	Red card	Yellow card	(yellow card) (yellow-red card)	Red card	Yellow card	(yellow card) (yellow-red card)	Red card
2	DF	(Italy) Tommaso Avitabile	1	0	0	0	0	0	1	0	0
3	DF	(Italy) Mattia Marello	1	0	0	0	0	0	1	0	0
4	MF	(Italy) Filippo Cerpelletti	1	0	0	0	0	0	1	0	0
5	DF	(Italy) Lorenzo Tosto	1	0	0	0	0	0	1	0	0
6	DF	(France) Yvan Maye	1	0	0	0	0	0	1	0	0
7	MF	(Poland) Iwo Kaczmarski	4	0	0	0	0	0	4	0	0
8	MF	(Italy) Luca Fiordilino	0	0	0	1	0	0	1	0	0
10	FW	(Italy) Richi Agbonifo	1	0	0	0	0	0	1	0	0
11	FW	(Poland) Jan Żuberek	3	0	0	0	0	0	3	0	0
14	MF	(Italy) Leonardo Bovo	3	0	0	0	0	0	3	0	0
15	DF	(Italy) Francesco Stante	2	0	0	0	0	0	2	0	0
27	DF	(Italy) Mike Aidoo	2	0	0	0	0	0	2	0	0
45	FW	(Italy) Matteo Lavelli	1	0	0	0	0	0	1	0	0
75	DF	(Italy) Leonardo Bovio	1	0	1	0	0	0	1	0	1
45	FW	(Italy) Matteo Lavelli	1	0	0	0	0	0	1	0	0
80	DF	(Italy) Gabriele Garonetti	1	0	0	0	0	0	1	0	0
86	DF	(Croatia) Leon Jakirović	1	0	0	0	0	0	1	0	0
99	FW	(Italy) Tommaso Fumagalli	2	0	0	0	0	0	2	0	0
Totals			24	0	1	1	0	0	25	0	1
