= 2025–26 Inter Milan season =

Inter Milan
2025–26 season
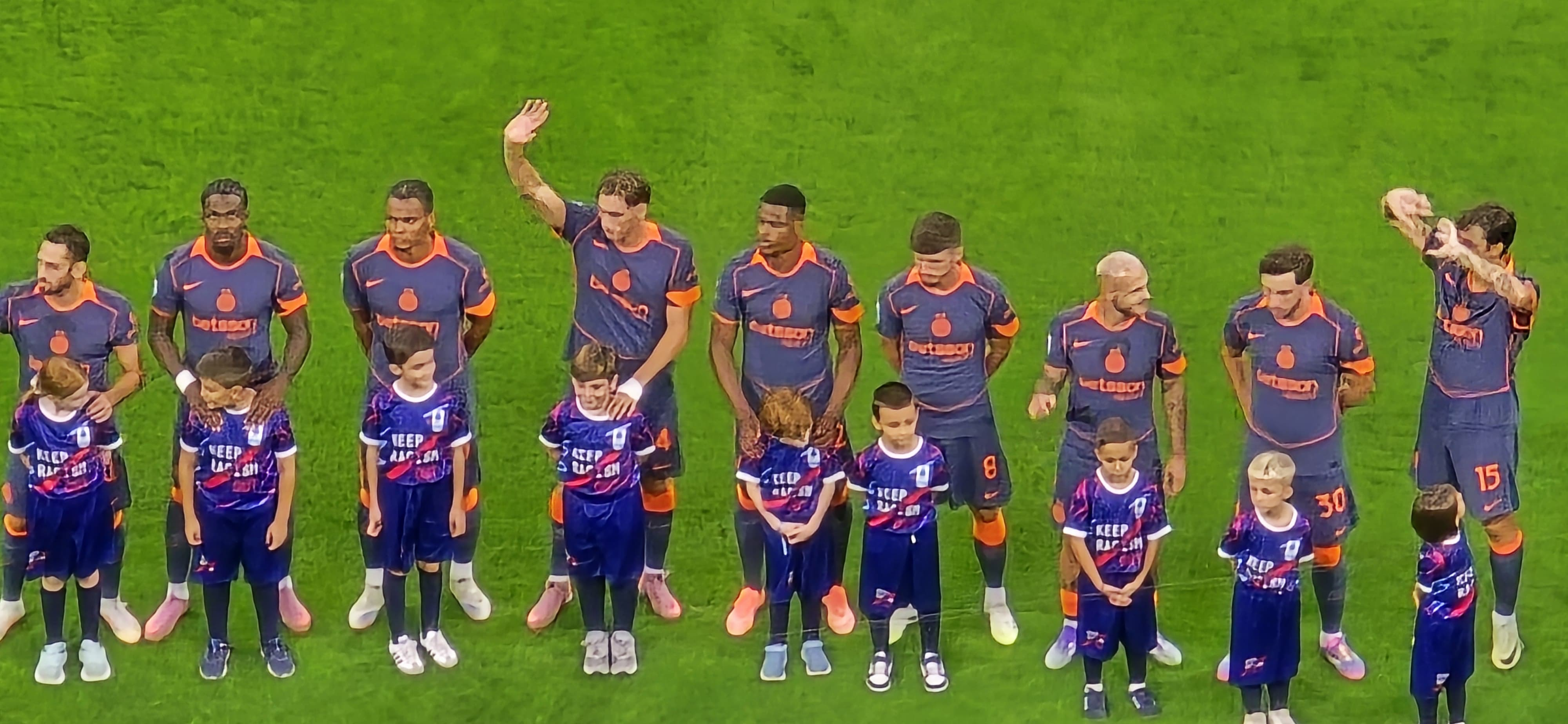
- Inter players lining up before a match against Sassuolo in September 2025
- Chairman: Giuseppe Marotta
- Head coach: Cristian Chivu
- Stadium: San Siro
- Serie A: 1st
- Coppa Italia: Winners
- Supercoppa Italiana: Semi-finals
- UEFA Champions League: Knockout phase play-offs
- Top goalscorer: League: Lautaro Martínez (17); All: Lautaro Martínez (22)
- Highest home attendance: 75,562 v Milan; 23 November 2025 (Serie A)
- Lowest home attendance: 44,910 v Venezia; 3 December 2025 (Coppa Italia)
- Average home league attendance: 73,305
- Biggest win: 5–0 v Torino; 25 August 2025 (Serie A); 5–0 v Sassuolo; 8 February 2026 (Serie A)
- Biggest defeat: 1–3 v Napoli; 25 October 2025 (Serie A); 1–3 v Arsenal; 20 January 2026 (Champions League); 1–3 v Bodø/Glimt; 18 February 2026 (Champions League)
Home colours	Away colours	Third colours

The 2025–26 season was the 118th season in the existence of Inter Milan, which have all been played in the top division of Italian football. In addition to the domestic league, Inter also participated in this season's editions of the Coppa Italia, the Supercoppa Italiana and the UEFA Champions League.

== Kits ==
Supplier: Nike / Front sponsor: Betsson Sport / Back sponsor: U-Power / Sleeve sponsor: GATE.io

Outfield players kits

Home	Home alt.	Home alt. 2	Away	Away alt.	Third	Special

Goalkeeper kits

Goalkeeper 1	Goalkeeper 2	Goalkeeper 3	Goalkeeper 4	Total 90 1	Total 90 2	Total 90 3	Total 90 4	Special

== Season summary ==
=== Background and pre-season ===
In June 2025, ahead of the 2025 FIFA Club World Cup, Argentine forward Joaquín Correa left Inter to join Botafogo, while the club strengthened their squad by signing Croatian midfielder Petar Sučić from Dinamo Zagreb and Brazilian winger Luis Henrique from Olympique de Marseille. Inter also promoted promising youth academy talent Francesco Pio Esposito to the first team following his return from a loan spell at Spezia. Additionally, the club exercised their option to make Nicola Zalewski's move from Roma permanent.

Following the conclusion of the 2024–25 season, Inter parted ways with Austrian striker Marko Arnautović after his contract expired.

On 5 July 2025, Inter officially announced the signing of French striker Ange-Yoan Bonny from Parma for a reported fee of €23 million plus bonuses.

On 18 August, Zalewski left Inter to join Atalanta in a transfer reportedly worth €17 million. Four days later, on 22 August, French midfielder Andy Diouf was signed from Lens for a reported €20 million fee. On 25 August, Kristjan Asllani joined Torino on a season-long loan that includes an option to buy for around €12 million.

=== August ===
On 25 August 2025, Inter began their Serie A campaign with a commanding 5–0 victory against Torino, as Alessandro Bastoni, Marcus Thuram (who netted a brace), Lautaro Martínez and new signing Ange-Yoan Bonny all found the scoresheet.

On 31 August, Mehdi Taremi departed Inter after just one season, moving to Super League Greece club Olympiacos. On the same day, the team suffered their first defeat of the season, as Udinese came from behind to claim a 2–1 victory after Denzel Dumfries had initially put Inter ahead.

=== September ===
On deadline day, Inter finalised two defensive moves: Swiss centre-back Manuel Akanji was brought in from Manchester City on a season-long loan, while French defender Benjamin Pavard was loaned to Marseille for the same duration.

Inter's first game of September was against rivals Juventus at Juventus Stadium. Lloyd Kelly would open the scoring for Juventus but Hakan Calhanoglu would equalise in the 30th minute before Kenan Yildiz made it 2-1 eight minutes later with the first half finishing 2-1 to Juventus. Calhanoglu would equalise for the 2nd time in the 65th minute before Marcus Thuram gave Inter the lead for the first time in the 76th minute. Juventus would then equalise with Marcus Thuram's brother, Khephren Thuram scoring in the 80th minute before Juventus grabbed the winner in stoppage time with a Vasilije Adzic long range effort. This left Inter 11th in the league after 3 games.

Inter would then begin their Champions League campaign away to Ajax at the Johan Cruijff ArenA. They would go onto to win the game 2-0 after goals from Marcus Thuram late in the first half and early in the second half.

Inter would then win their next two league games, beating Sassuolo 2-1 at home and Cagliari 2-0 away moving them up to 5th in the table.

Inter would then finish September by beating Slavia Prague 3-0 in the champions league at the San Siro putting them third in the league phase table after two games.

=== October ===
Inter would begin October by defeating Cremonese 4-1 at the San Siro moving them up into the champions league places with debutant Ange-Yoan Bonny scoring a goal and assisting Lautaro Martinez, Fedrico Dimarco and Nicolo Barella.

Inter would then beat league leaders Roma 1-0 at the Stadio Olimpico to move up to second in the league.

Inter would then keep up their winning start to the champions league by taking a 4-0 away win to Union Saint-Gilloise with Denzel Dumfries, Lautaro Martinez, Hakan Calhanoglu and Francesco Pio Esposito all on the scoresheet as Inter moved up to third in the league phase table.

Inter would then travel to the Stadio Diego Armando Maradona to face defending champions Napoli. Napoli would take the lead after a Kevin De Bruyne penalty in the 33rd minute, with the hosts doubling their advantage in the 54th minute after a goal from Scott McTominay. Hakan Calhanoglu would get a goal back from a penalty before Frank Anguissa sealed the points before Napoli in the 66th minute. This left Inter 4th in the league 3 points off 1st placed Napoli.

Inter would finish October by defeating Fiorentina 3-0 at the San Siro moving them up to third place in the league 3 points behind Napoli.

=== November ===
Inter would begin November with an away trip to Hellas Verona. Inter would take the lead after a Piotr Zieliński scored in the 16th minute but Giovane would equalise in the 40th minute. Inter would then win the game after Verona defender Martin Frese stoppage time own goal moving them up to second place in Serie A.

Inter would then continue their 100 percent record in the champions league by beating Kairat 2-1 at the San Siro keeping Inter third in the league phase table with 12 points.

Inter followed up their champions league win by beating Lazio 2-0 at the San Siro to move them top of the league on goal difference, the first time since matchday 1 they had topped the league.

Inter's next game was against city rivals AC Milan with Inter as the designated home team. After a goalless first half, Christian Pulisic would give Milan the lead in the 54th minute and despite getting a penalty 17 minutes later Çalhanoglu's penalty would be saved by Mike Maignan and Milan would win 1-0 dropping Inter to 4th in the league 3 points behind Roma.

Inter would then suffer their first defeat in the champions league to Atlético Madrid after conceding a stoppage time goal dropping them to 4th in the league phase table.

Inter would then finish November with a trip to newly promoted Pisa. They would go onto to win 2-0 after a brace from Lautaro Martinez which moved Inter up to third place in the league 2 points behind leaders Milan.

=== December ===
Inter's Coppa Italia began in the round of 16 at home to Serie B club Venezia. Inter would defeat the Serie B side 5-1 with Marcus Thuram grabbing a brace, confirming Inter's spot in the quarter finals.

Inter's first league of December was at home to Como. They would win the game 4-0 with Martinez, Thuram, Çalhanoğlu and Carlos Augusto all on the scoresheet as Inter moved top of the league temporarily until wins for Milan and Napoli put them back in third place.

Inter would then suffer a late defeat to Liverpool in the champions league after conceding a penalty in the 88th minute which was converted by Dominik Szoboszlai. The loss put Inter 5th in the league phase table but saw their gap to the playoff phase reduced to 1 point.

Inter would then bounce back from the loss by beating Genoa 2-1 away from home moving them top of the league by one point.

Inter would then face Bologna in the Supercoppa Italiana semi finals. Thuram would give Inter the lead in the second minute but Bologna would equalise in the 35th minute after Yann Bisseck handled the ball in the area with Riccardo Orsolini converting the penalty. The game would finish 1-1 resulting a penalty shootout. Inter would lose the shootout 3-2 after Alessandro Bastoni, Nicolò Barella and Ange-Yoan Bonny all failed to convert their kicks eliminating them from the Supercoppa and ending their chances of claiming the first silverware of the season.

Inter would bounce back by beating Atalanta 1-0 away from home in their final game of 2025, meaning they ended the year top of the Serie A table with 36 points.

=== January ===
Inter would begin 2026 by getting revenge on Bologna for the Supercoppa Italiana semi final defeat with a 3-1 win at the San Siro keeping them top of the league by one point.

Inter would then follow up this result by beating Parma 2-0 away from home and with Milan drawing the next day Inter extended their lead at the top of the table to 3 points.

Inter's next game would be against defending champions Napoli at the San Siro. Fedrico Dimarco would open the scoring for Inter before Scott McTominay would draw Napoli level in the 26th minute with the first half ending 1-1. Çalhanoğlu would give Inter the lead again in the 73rd minute from a penalty before McTominay would equalise again 8 minutes later. The game would finish 2-2 which kept Inter 3 points ahead of second placed Milan in the title race.

Inter's next game was the delayed game against Leece due to Inter's participation in the Supercoppa Italiana. Inter would win the game 1-0 after a Pio Esposito goal in the 78th minute extending their lead to 6 points until Milan won the next day to cut the gap back to 3.

Inter's next league game was away to Udinese. They would win 1-0 after a Lautaro Martinez goal in the 20th minute keeping them 3 points clear of Milan in the title race.

Inter's first champions league game of 2026 was at home to league phase leaders Arsenal. Arsenal would open the scoring after a Gabriel Jesus goal in the 10th minute but Petar Sucic would equalise in the 18th minute. However Jesus would give Arsenal the lead back in the 31st minute before Viktor Gyokeres scored to give Arsenal the win dropping Inter to 14th in the league phase.

Inter would bounce back from the champions league defeat by defeating Pisa 6-2 and with Milan drawing to Roma, Inter extended their lead at the top of the table to 5 points.

Inter's final game of January was against Borussia Dortmund in the champions league. Inter would win the game after goals from Federico Dimarco and Andy Diouf but despite the win they missed out on automatic qualification to the champions league knockout phase meaning they would face a two legged playoff to make the round of 16.

== Players ==
=== First-team squad ===
As of 27 January 2026

No.	Player	Nat.	Position(s)	Date of birth (age)	Height	Preferred Foot	Signed		Transfer fee	Contract end	Ref.
No.	Player	Nat.	Position(s)	Date of birth (age)	Height	Preferred Foot	In	From	Transfer fee	Contract end	Ref.
Goalkeepers
1	Yann Sommer	SUI	GK	17 December 1988 (age 37)	1.83 m (6 ft 0 in)	Right	2023	(Germany) Bayern Munich	€6.9m	2026	
12	Raffaele Di Gennaro	ITA	GK	3 October 1993 (age 33)	1.86 m (6 ft 1 in)	Right	2023	(Italy) Gubbio	Free	2026	
13	Josep Martínez	ESP	GK	27 May 1998 (age 28)	1.91 m (6 ft 3 in)	Right	2024	(Italy) Genoa	€13.2m	2029	
Defenders
2	Denzel Dumfries	NED	RWB	18 April 1996 (age 30)	1.88 m (6 ft 2 in)	Right	2021	(Netherlands) PSV Eindhoven	€14.25m	2028	
6	Stefan de Vrij	NED	CB	5 February 1992 (age 34)	1.89 m (6 ft 2 in)	Right	2018	(Italy) Lazio	Free	2026	
15	Francesco Acerbi	ITA	CB	10 February 1988 (age 38)	1.92 m (6 ft 4 in)	Left	2022 (Note: Initially signed on loan. The indicated transfer fee represents the total amount, including the initial loan fee.)	(Italy) Lazio	€4.0m	2026	
25	Manuel Akanji	SUI	CB	19 July 1995 (age 31)	1.88 m (6 ft 2 in)	Right	2025	(England) Manchester City (on loan)	€2.0m (Note: Loan fee.)	2026	
30	Carlos Augusto	BRA	LWB / CB	7 January 1999 (age 27)	1.84 m (6 ft 0 in)	Left	2023	(Italy) Monza	€13.2m	2028	
31	Yann Aurel Bisseck	GER	CB	29 November 2000 (age 25)	1.96 m (6 ft 5 in)	Right	2023	(Denmark) AGF	€7.2m	2029	
32	Federico Dimarco (4th captain)	ITA	LWB	10 November 1997 (age 29)	1.75 m (5 ft 9 in)	Left	2018	(Switzerland) Sion	€5.2m	2027	
36	Matteo Darmian	ITA	RWB / LWB / CB	2 December 1989 (age 36)	1.82 m (6 ft 0 in)	Right	2020	(Italy) Parma	€3.3m	2026	
95	Alessandro Bastoni (3rd captain)	ITA	CB	13 April 1999 (age 27)	1.90 m (6 ft 3 in)	Left	2017	(Italy) Atalanta	€31.1m	2028	
Midfielders
7	Piotr Zieliński	POL	CM / AM / DM	20 May 1994 (age 32)	1.80 m (5 ft 11 in)	Both	2024	(Italy) Napoli	Free	2028	
8	Petar Sučić	CRO	CM / DM	25 October 2003 (age 23)	1.83 m (6 ft 0 in)	Right	2025	(Croatia) Dinamo Zagreb	€14.0m	2030	
11	Luis Henrique	BRA	RW / LW / RWB / LWB	14 December 2001 (age 24)	1.81 m (5 ft 11 in)	Right	2025	(France) Marseille	€23.0m	2030	
16	Davide Frattesi	ITA	CM / AM	22 September 1999 (age 27)	1.78 m (5 ft 10 in)	Right	2023	(Italy) Sassuolo	€31.9m	2028	
17	Andy Diouf	FRA	CM / RM / AM	17 May 2003 (age 23)	1.87 m (6 ft 2 in)	Left	2025	(France) Lens	€20.0m	2030	
20	Hakan Çalhanoğlu	TUR	DM / CM / AM	8 February 1994 (age 32)	1.78 m (5 ft 10 in)	Right	2021	(Italy) Milan	Free	2027	
22	Henrikh Mkhitaryan	ARM	CM / AM	21 January 1989 (age 37)	1.77 m (5 ft 10 in)	Both	2022	(Italy) Roma	Free	2026	
23	Nicolò Barella (vice-captain)	ITA	CM	7 February 1997 (age 29)	1.75 m (5 ft 9 in)	Right	2019	(Italy) Cagliari	€40.5m	2029	
Forwards
9	Marcus Thuram	FRA	ST	6 August 1997 (age 29)	1.92 m (6 ft 4 in)	Right	2023	(Germany) Borussia Mönchengladbach	Free	2028	
10	Lautaro Martínez (captain)	ARG	ST	22 August 1997 (age 29)	1.74 m (5 ft 9 in)	Right	2018	(Argentina) Racing Club	€25.0m	2029	
14	Ange-Yoan Bonny	CIV	ST	25 October 2003 (age 23)	1.89 m (6 ft 2 in)	Right	2025	(Italy) Parma	€23.0m	2030	
94	Pio Esposito	ITA	ST	28 June 2005 (age 21)	1.91 m (6 ft 3 in)	Right	2023	Youth sector	N/A	2030	
Players transferred out during the season
5	Benjamin Pavard	FRA	CB / RB	28 March 1996 (aged 29)	1.86 m (6 ft 1 in)	Right	2023	(Germany) Bayern Munich	€31.3m	2028	
42	Tomás Palacios	ARG	CB	28 April 2003 (age 23)	1.96 m (6 ft 5 in)	Left	2024	(Argentina) Independiente Rivadavia	€6.5m	2029	

== Transfers ==
=== In ===
==== Transfers ====
Date	Pos.	Player	Moving from	Fee	Notes	Ref.
Summer
1 July 2025	MF	(Poland) Nicola Zalewski	(Italy) Roma	€6.5M	From loan to permanent transfer	
5 July 2025	FW	(Ivory Coast) Ange-Yoan Bonny	(Italy) Parma	€23.0M + €2.0M		
22 August 2025	MF	(France) Andy Diouf	(France) Lens	€20.0M + €5.0M		
Winter
2 February 2026	MF	(France) Yanis Massolin	(Italy) Modena	€3.5M + bonuses		

==== On loan ====
Date	Pos.	Player	Loaned from	Fee	Notes	Ref.
Summer
1 September 2025 (Note: The contract was registered on 1 September 2025, Inter officially announced the move the following day.)	DF	(Switzerland) Manuel Akanji	(England) Manchester City	€2.0M	Loan with option and conditional obligation to buy for €15.0M	

==== Loan returns ====
Date	Pos.	Player	Returning from	Notes	Ref.
Summer
30 June 2025	GK	(Italy) Paolo Raimondi	(Italy) Pro Palazzolo		
30 June 2025	GK	(Serbia) Filip Stanković	(Italy) Venezia		
30 June 2025	DF	(Argentina) Franco Carboni	(Italy) Venezia		
30 June 2025	DF	(Italy) Alessandro Fontanarosa	(Italy) Carrarese		
30 June 2025	DF	(Italy) Giacomo Stabile	(Italy) Alcione		
30 June 2025	DF	(Italy) Francesco Stante	(Italy) Pergolettese		
30 June 2025	DF	(Belgium) Zinho Vanheusden	(Belgium) KV Mechelen		
30 June 2025	MF	(Nigeria) Ebenezer Akinsanmiro	(Italy) Sampdoria		
30 June 2025	MF	(Italy) Luca Di Maggio	(Italy) Perugia		
30 June 2025	MF	(France) Issiaka Kamate	(Italy) Modena		
30 June 2025	MF	(Serbia) Aleksandar Stanković	(Switzerland) Luzern		
30 June 2025	MF	(Canada) Tajon Buchanan	(Spain) Villarreal		
30 June 2025	FW	(Italy) Enoch Owusu	(Switzerland) St. Gallen		
30 June 2025	FW	(Italy) Eddie Salcedo	(Greece) OFI		
30 June 2025	FW	(Senegal) Amadou Sarr	(Italy) Foggia		
30 June 2025	FW	(Uruguay) Martín Satriano	(France) Lens		
30 June 2025	FW	(Poland) Jan Żuberek	(Italy) Avellino		
Winter
8 January 2026	MF	(Argentina) Valentín Carboni	(Italy) Genoa		
9 January 2026	DF	(Italy) Giacomo Stabile	(Italy) Juve Stabia		
9 January 2026	FW	(Italy) Giacomo De Pieri	(Italy) Juve Stabia		
29 January 2026	DF	(Argentina) Franco Carboni	(Italy) Empoli		
30 January 2026	MF	(Albania) Kristjan Asllani	(Italy) Torino		

==== Inter Milan U23 acquisitions ====
Date	Pos.	Player	Moving from	Fee	Notes	Ref.
Summer
25 July 2025	GK	(Italy) Riccardo Melgrati	(Italy) SPAL	Free		
25 July 2025	DF	(Italy) Tommaso Avitabile	(Italy) Ciliverghe	Undisclosed		
25 July 2025	DF	(Italy) Giuseppe Prestia	(Italy) Cesena	Free		
30 July 2025	DF	(Italy) Simone Cinquegrano	(Italy) Sassuolo	N/A	On loan with option to buy	
1 August 2025	FW	(Italy) Richi Agbonifo	(Italy) Hellas Verona	€1.3M + €0.7M		
8 August 2025	MF	(Italy) Luca Fiordilino	(Italy) Triestina	Free		
13 August 2025	DF	(Romania) Antonio David	(Italy) Cesena	N/A	On loan with option to buy	
21 August 2025	FW	(Italy) Antonino La Gumina	(Italy) Sampdoria	N/A	On loan	
30 August 2025	MF	(Poland) Iwo Kaczmarski	(Italy) Empoli	N/A	On loan with obligation to buy	
Summer
26 January 2026	DF	(Croatia) Leon Jakirović	(Croatia) Dinamo Zagreb	€2.5M + €2.0M		
28 January 2026	DF	(Italy) Igor Amerighi	(Italy) Cavese	Undisclosed		

Total expenditure: ▼€58.8 million (excluding undisclosed figures)

=== Out ===
==== Released players ====
Date	Pos.	Player	Subsequent club	Join date	Notes	Ref.
Summer
1 July 2025	FW	(Austria) Marko Arnautović	(Serbia) Red Star Belgrade	21 July 2025	End of contract	

==== Transfers ====
Date	Pos.	Player	Moving to	Fee	Notes	Ref.
Summer
1 July 2025	GK	(Serbia) Filip Stanković	(Italy) Venezia	€1.5M + 50% sell-on	From loan to permanent transfer	
1 July 2025	FW	(Italy) Enoch Owusu	(Switzerland) St. Gallen	Undisclosed	From loan to permanent transfer	
1 July 2025	FW	(Uruguay) Martín Satriano	(France) Lens	€5.0M	From loan to permanent transfer	
2 July 2025	FW	(Italy) Eddie Salcedo	(Greece) OFI	Undisclosed	From loan to permanent transfer	
24 July 2025	MF	(Serbia) Aleksandar Stanković	(Belgium) Club Brugge	€10.0M	Inter retain a buy-back clause	
29 July 2025	MF	(Canada) Tajon Buchanan	(Spain) Villarreal	€9.0M + 20% sell-on		
7 August 2025	DF	(Belgium) Zinho Vanheusden	(Spain) Marbella	Undisclosed		
18 August 2025	MF	(Poland) Nicola Zalewski	(Italy) Atalanta	€17.0M		
20 August 2025	DF	(Italy) Alessandro Fontanarosa	(Italy) Avellino	Free + 50% sell-on		
20 August 2025	FW	(Senegal) Amadou Sarr	(Italy) AlbinoLeffe	Free + 50% sell-on		
31 August 2025	FW	(Iran) Mehdi Taremi	(Greece) Olympiacos	€2.5M		

==== Loans out ====
Date	Pos.	Player	Loaned to	Fee	Notes	Ref.
Summer
17 July 2025	DF	(Argentina) Franco Carboni	(Italy) Empoli	N/A	Loan with conditional obligation to buy	
18 July 2025	MF	(Argentina) Valentín Carboni	(Italy) Genoa	N/A		
22 July 2025	MF	(Nigeria) Ebenezer Akinsanmiro	(Italy) Pisa	N/A	Loan with option to buy and counter-option	
24 July 2025	FW	(Italy) Giacomo De Pieri	(Italy) Juve Stabia	N/A		
1 August 2025	MF	(Italy) Luca Di Maggio	(Italy) Padova	N/A	Loan with option to buy and counter-option	
5 August 2025	DF	(Italy) Giacomo Stabile	(Italy) Juve Stabia	N/A		
6 August 2025	MF	(Venezuela) Daniele Quieto	(Italy) Latina	N/A		
9 August 2025	DF	(Italy) Mike Aidoo	(Italy) Pergolettese	N/A		
12 August 2025	FW	(Italy) Sebastiano Esposito	(Italy) Cagliari	N/A	Loan with conditional obligation to buy for €4.0M and a 40% sell-on clause	
14 August 2025	DF	(Italy) Matteo Motta	(Italy) Lumezzane	N/A		
25 August 2025	MF	(Albania) Kristjan Asllani	(Italy) Torino	€1.5M	Loan with option to buy for €12.0M and a 20% sell-on clause	
1 September 2025	DF	(France) Benjamin Pavard	(France) Marseille	€2.5M	Loan with option to buy for €15.0M	
1 September 2025	GK	(Italy) Matteo Zamarian	(Italy) Pro Patria	N/A		
Winter
8 January 2026	MF	(Argentina) Valentín Carboni	(Argentina) Racing Club	N/A		
9 January 2026	DF	(Italy) Giacomo Stabile	(Italy) Bari	N/A		
9 January 2026	FW	(Italy) Giacomo De Pieri	(Italy) Bari	N/A		
27 January 2026	DF	(Argentina) Tomás Palacios	(Argentina) Estudiantes (LP)	N/A	Loan with option to buy	
29 January 2026	DF	(Argentina) Franco Carboni	(Italy) Parma	N/A	Loan with option to buy	
30 January 2026	MF	(Albania) Kristjan Asllani	(Turkey) Beşiktaş	N/A	Loan with option to buy for €11.0M	
2 February 2026	MF	(France) Yanis Massolin	(Italy) Modena	N/A		

==== Loans ended ====
Date	Pos.	Player	Returning to	Notes	Ref.
Summer
30 June 2025	DF	(Spain) Álex Pérez	(Spain) Real Betis		
30 June 2025	MF	(Poland) Nicola Zalewski	(Italy) Roma		

Total income: ▲€49.0 million (excluding undisclosed figures)

== Pre-season and friendlies ==
Win Draw Loss Fixtures

3 August 2025 Friendly	Internazionale	7–2	Internazionale U23	Appiano Gentile
10:30 CEST (UTC+2)	Kamate 11' (o.g.); Bonny 15'; Asllani 32' (pen.); L. Martínez 41'; Esposito 50'; Luis Henrique 63'; Çalhanoğlu 90'	Report	Spinaccè 8'; Mosconi 30'	Stadium: BPER Training Centre; Referee: Andrea Calzavara

8 August 2025 Friendly	Monaco	1–2	Internazionale	Monaco
20:00 CEST (UTC+2)	Akliouche 2'	Report	Çalhanoğlu (yellow card) 17' (yellow-red card) 36'; L. Martínez (yellow card) 27', (goal) 60'; Bonny 80'	Stadium: Stade Louis II; Attendance: 13,000; Referee: Mathieu Vernice (France)

12 August 2025 Friendly	Monza	2–2 (3–5 p)	Internazionale	Monza
21:00 CEST (UTC+2)	Ciurria 32'; Azzi 89'	Report	Birindelli 45+1' (o.g.); Esposito 52'	Stadium: Stadio Brianteo; Referee: Kevin Bonacina
	Penalties
	Obiang (penalty scored); Galazzi (penalty scored); Ganvoula (penalty scored); Sardo (penalty missed)		(penalty scored) L. Martínez; (penalty scored) Bastoni; (penalty scored) Barella; (penalty scored) Acerbi; (penalty scored) Thuram

16 August 2025 Friendly	Internazionale	2–0	Olympiacos	Bari
20:30 CEST (UTC+2)	Dimarco 16'; Barella (yellow card) 38'; L. Martínez (yellow card) 45'; Thuram 53'	Report	Onyemaechi (yellow card) 38'	Stadium: Stadio San Nicola; Attendance: 40,125; Referee: Ivano Pezzuto (Italy)

5 September 2025 Friendly	Internazionale	3–1	Padova	Appiano Gentile
11:30 CEST (UTC+2)	Mkhitaryan 33'; Carlos Augusto 49'; Diouf 60'	Report	Bortolussi 63'	Stadium: BPER Training Centre

10 October 2025 Reconstruction Cup-FDRL	Atlético Madrid	1–1 (4–2 p)	Internazionale	Benghazi, Libya
18:20 EET (UTC+2)	Martín 35'; Ruggeri (yellow card) 63'	Report	Bisseck 59'; Acerbi (yellow card) 85'	Stadium: Benghazi International Stadium; Attendance: 42,000; Referee: Mustafa Al-Darsi (Libya)
	Penalties
	Griezmann (penalty scored); Koke (penalty missed); Ruggeri (penalty scored); Janneh (penalty scored); Lenglet (penalty scored)		(penalty scored) Venturini; (penalty scored) Lavelli; (penalty missed) Luis Henrique; (penalty missed) Acerbi

== Competitions ==
=== Overview ===
Competition	First match	Last match	Starting round	Final position	Record							
Competition	First match	Last match	Starting round	Final position	Pld	W	D	L	GF	GA	GD	Win %
Serie A	25 August 2025	23 May 2026	Matchday 1	Winners	38	27	6	5	89	35	+54	71.05
Coppa Italia	3 December 2025	13 May 2026	Round of 16	Winners	5	4	1	0	14	4	+10	80.00
Supercoppa Italiana	19 December 2025		Semi-finals	Semi-finals	1	0	1	0	1	1	+0	0.00
UEFA Champions League	17 September 2025	24 February 2026	League phase	Knockout phase play-offs	10	5	0	5	17	12	+5	50.00
Total					54	36	8	10	121	52	+69	66.67

Source: Soccerway

=== Serie A ===
==== League table ====
Pos	Team	Pld	W	D	L	GF	GA	GD	Pts	Qualification or relegation
1	Inter Milan (C)	38	27	6	5	89	35	+54	87	Qualification for the UEFA Champions League league phase
2	Napoli	38	23	7	8	58	36	+22	76	Qualification for the UEFA Champions League league phase
3	Roma	38	23	4	11	59	31	+28	73	Qualification for the UEFA Champions League league phase
4	Como	38	20	11	7	65	29	+36	71	Qualification for the UEFA Champions League league phase
5	AC Milan	38	20	10	8	53	35	+18	70	Qualification for the UEFA Europa League league phase (Note: Since the 2025–26 Coppa Italia winners, Inter Milan, qualified for the Champions League via league position, the Europa League spot awarded to the cup winners was passed to the sixth-placed team, and the Conference League spot was moved down one league position.)

Source: Serie A
Rules for classification: 1) Points; 2) Tiebreaker for Champions team and third relegated team; 3) Head-to-head points; 4) Head-to-head goal difference; 5) Goal difference; 6) Goals scored; 7) Draw.
(Note: Head-to-head record is used only after all the matches between the teams in question have been played)
(C) Champions

==== Results summary ====
Overall								Home						Away					
Pld	W	D	L	GF	GA	GD	Pts	W	D	L	GF	GA	GD	W	D	L	GF	GA	GD
38	27	6	5	89	35	+54	87	14	3	2	50	16	+34	13	3	3	39	19	+20

Source: Serie A

==== Results by round ====
Round	1	2	3	4	5	6	7	8	9	10	11	12	13	14	15	17	18	19	20	16^{1}	21	22	23	24	25	26	27	28	29	30	31	32	33	34	35	36	37	38
Ground	H	H	A	H	A	H	A	A	H	A	H	H	A	H	A	A	H	A	H	H	A	H	A	A	H	A	H	A	H	A	H	A	H	A	H	A	H	A
Result	W	L	L	W	W	W	W	L	W	W	W	L	W	W	W	W	W	W	D	W	W	W	W	W	W	W	W	L	D	D	W	W	W	D	W	W	D	D
Position	1	6	11	10	5	4	2	4	3	2	1	4	3	3	1	1	1	1	1	1	1	1	1	1	1	1	1	1	1	1	1	1	1	1	1	1	1	1
Points	3	3	3	6	9	12	15	15	18	21	24	24	27	30	33	36	39	42	43	46	49	52	55	58	61	64	67	67	68	69	72	75	78	79	82	85	86	87

Source: Serie A
A = Away; H = Home; W = Win; D = Draw; L = Loss
Notes:
- Positions show the situation at the end of the corresponding gameweeks (GW), not the position at the conclusion of matches or game days.

^{1} Matchday 16 (vs Lecce) was postponed due to Inter's participation in the Supercoppa Italiana.

==== Matches ====
The league fixtures were released on 6 June 2025.

25 August 2025 1	Internazionale	5–0	Torino	Milan
20:45 CEST (UTC+2)	Bastoni 18'; Thuram 36', 62'; L. Martínez 52'; Bonny 72'	Report		Stadium: San Siro; Attendance: 72,332; Referee: Federico La Penna

31 August 2025 2	Internazionale	1–2	Udinese	Milan
20:45 CEST (UTC+2)	Dumfries 17'; L. Martínez (yellow card) 88'	Report	Davis 29' (pen.); Bertola (yellow card) 38'; Atta 40'; Sava (yellow card) 77'	Stadium: San Siro; Attendance: 70,796; Referee: Matteo Marchetti

13 September 2025 3	Juventus	4–3	Internazionale	Turin
18:00 CEST (UTC+2)	Kelly 14'; Koopmeiners (yellow card) 33'; Yıldız 38'; Locatelli (yellow card) 70'; K. Thuram 83'; Adžić 90+1'	Report	Çalhanoğlu 30', 65'; M. Thuram 76'; Mkhitaryan (yellow card) 86'; Acerbi (yellow card) 90+7'	Stadium: Juventus Stadium; Attendance: 41,664; Referee: Andrea Colombo

21 September 2025 4	Internazionale	2–1	Sassuolo	Milan
20:45 CEST (UTC+2)	Dimarco 14', (yellow card) 58'; Çalhanoğlu (yellow card) 32'; Muharemović 81' (o.g.)	Report	Cheddira 84'; Muharemović (yellow card) 90+5'	Stadium: San Siro; Attendance: 68,852; Referee: Livio Marinelli

27 September 2025 5	Cagliari	0–2	Internazionale	Cagliari
20:45 CEST (UTC+2)		Report	L. Martínez 9'; Carlos Augusto (yellow card) 45'; Barella (yellow card) 59'; Esposito 82'	Stadium: Unipol Domus; Attendance: 16,000; Referee: Marco Piccinini

4 October 2025 6	Internazionale	4–1	Cremonese	Milan
18:00 CEST (UTC+2)	L. Martínez 6'; Bonny 38'; Dimarco 55'; Barella 57'; Sučić (yellow card) 84'	Report	Pezzella (yellow card) 86'; Bonazzoli 87'	Stadium: San Siro; Attendance: 73,417; Referee: Ermanno Feliciani

18 October 2025 7	Roma	0–1	Internazionale	Rome
20:45 CEST (UTC+2)	Ndicka (yellow card) 40'; Ziółkowski (yellow card) 70'; Hermoso (yellow card) 73'; Baldanzi (yellow card) 90+4'	Report	L. Martínez (yellow card) 4'; Bonny 6'; Mkhitaryan (yellow card) 74'; Sučić (yellow card) 79'	Stadium: Stadio Olimpico; Attendance: 65,849; Referee: Davide Massa

25 October 2025 8	Napoli	3–1	Internazionale	Naples
18:00 CEST (UTC+2)	De Bruyne 33' (pen.); Di Lorenzo (yellow card) 43'; Gilmour (yellow card) 45+6'; McTominay 54'; Zambo Anguissa 67'	Report	Çalhanoğlu 59' (pen.); Bastoni (yellow card) 77'	Stadium: Stadio Diego Armando Maradona; Attendance: 54,200; Referee: Maurizio Mariani

29 October 2025 9	Internazionale	3–0	Fiorentina	Milan
20:45 CET (UTC+1)	Esposito (yellow card) 65'; Çalhanoğlu 66', 88' (pen.); Sučić 71'	Report	Viti (yellow card) 49' (yellow-red card) 86'	Stadium: San Siro; Attendance: 71,096; Referee: Simone Sozza

2 November 2025 10	Hellas Verona	1–2	Internazionale	Verona
12:30 CET (UTC+1)	Giovane 40'; Orban (yellow card) 41'; Bella-Kotchap (yellow card) 90+6'	Report	Zieliński 16'; Bisseck (yellow card) 66'; Frese 90+3' (o.g.)	Stadium: Stadio Marcantonio Bentegodi; Attendance: 26,696; Referee: Daniele Doveri

9 November 2025 11	Internazionale	2–0	Lazio	Milan
20:45 CET (UTC+1)	L. Martínez 3'; Akanji (yellow card) 33'; Sučić (yellow card) 37'; Dumfries (yellow card) 52'; Bonny 62'	Report	Zaccagni (yellow card) 72'	Stadium: San Siro; Attendance: 73,797; Referee: Gianluca Manganiello

23 November 2025 12	Internazionale	0–1	Milan	Milan
20:45 CET (UTC+1)	Çalhanoğlu (yellow card) 61', (penalty missed) 74'	Report	Leão (yellow card) 45+2'; Pulisic 54'; Pavlović (yellow card) 72'	Stadium: San Siro; Attendance: 75,562; Referee: Simone Sozza

30 November 2025 13	Pisa	0–2	Internazionale	Pisa
15:00 CET (UTC+1)	Carraciolo (yellow card) 26'; Albiol (yellow card) 61'	Report	Acerbi (yellow card) 35'; L. Martínez 69', 83'	Stadium: Arena Garibaldi; Attendance: 12,542; Referee: Marco Guida

6 December 2025 14	Internazionale	4–0	Como	Milan
18:00 CET (UTC+1)	L. Martínez 11'; Thuram 59'; Çalhanoğlu 81'; Carlos Augusto 86'; Akanji (yellow card) 88'	Report	Perrone (yellow card) 44'; Diego Carlos (yellow card) 45+2'	Stadium: San Siro; Attendance: 75,022; Referee: Marco Di Bello

14 December 2025 15	Genoa	1–2	Internazionale	Genoa
18:00 CET (UTC+1)	Vitinha 68'; Ekhator (yellow card) 90+1'	Report	Bisseck 6', (yellow card) 78'; L. Martínez 38'; Akanji (yellow card) 54'; Barella (yellow card) 73'	Stadium: Stadio Luigi Ferraris; Attendance: 31,670; Referee: Daniele Doveri

28 December 2025 17	Atalanta	0–1	Internazionale	Bergamo
20:45 CET (UTC+1)	Kolašinac (yellow card) 19'; Sulemana (yellow card) 80'	Report	L. Martínez 65'; Bastoni (yellow card) 77'	Stadium: New Balance Arena; Attendance: 23,243; Referee: Federico La Penna

4 January 2026 18	Internazionale	3–1	Bologna	Milan
20:45 CET (UTC+1)	Çalhanoğlu (yellow card) 29'; Bastoni (yellow card) 30'; Zieliński 39'; L. Martínez 48'; Barella (yellow card) 62'; Thuram 74'	Report	Vitík (yellow card) 72'; Rowe (yellow card) 78'; Castro 83'; Lykogiannis (yellow card) 89'	Stadium: San Siro; Attendance: 74,710; Referee: Marco Guida

7 January 2026 19	Parma	0–2	Internazionale	Parma
20:45 CET (UTC+1)		Report	Çalhanoğlu (yellow card) 34'; Dimarco 42'; Carlos Augusto (yellow card) 90+1'; Thuram (yellow card) 90+7', (goal) 90+8'	Stadium: Stadio Ennio Tardini; Attendance: 21,601; Referee: Andrea Colombo

11 January 2026 20	Internazionale	2–2	Napoli	Milan
20:45 CET (UTC+1)	Dimarco 9'; Çalhanoğlu 73' (pen.)	Report	McTominay 26', 81'; Juan Jesus (yellow card) 90+2'	Stadium: San Siro; Attendance: 72,567; Referee: Daniele Doveri

14 January 2026 16	Internazionale	1–0	Lecce	Milan
20:45 CET (UTC+1)	Thuram (yellow card) 17'; Esposito 78'; Luis Henrique (yellow card) 90+3'	Report	Veiga (yellow card) 63'	Stadium: San Siro; Attendance: 69,321; Referee: Fabio Maresca
Note: The match was originally scheduled for 21 December 2025, but was postponed due to Inter's participation in the Supercoppa Italiana.

17 January 2026 21	Udinese	0–1	Internazionale	Udine
15:00 CET (UTC+1)		Report	L. Martínez 20'; Carlos Augusto (yellow card) 70'	Stadium: Stadio Friuli; Attendance: 24,929; Referee: Marco Di Bello

23 January 2026 22	Internazionale	6–2	Pisa	Milan
20:45 CET (UTC+1)	L. Martínez (yellow card) 26', (goal) 41'; Zieliński 39' (pen.); Esposito 45+2'; Dimarco 82'; Bonny 86'; Barella (yellow card) 89'; Mkhitaryan 90+3'	Report	Moreo 11', 23'; Marin (yellow card) 15'; Calabresi (yellow card) 56'; Akinsanmiro (yellow card) 78'	Stadium: San Siro; Attendance: 73,594; Referee: Matteo Marcenaro

1 February 2026 23	Cremonese	0–2	Internazionale	Cremona
18:00 CET (UTC+1)	Ceccherini (yellow card) 54'; Baschirotto (yellow card) 73'; Vardy (yellow card) 86'	Report	L. Martínez 16'; Zieliński 31'	Stadium: Stadio Giovanni Zini; Attendance: 14,824; Referee: Davide Massa

8 February 2026 24	Sassuolo	0–5	Internazionale	Reggio Emilia
18:00 CET (UTC+1)	Matić (yellow card) 54', (red card) 54'	Report	Bisseck 11'; Thuram 28'; L. Martínez 50'; Akanji 54'; Dimarco (yellow card) 82'; Luis Henrique 89'	Stadium: Mapei Stadium – Città del Tricolore; Attendance: 17,653; Referee: Daniele Chiffi

14 February 2026 25	Internazionale	3–2	Juventus	Milan
20:45 CET (UTC+1)	Bastoni (yellow card) 9'; Cambiaso 17' (o.g.); Barella (yellow card) 53'; Esposito 76'; Çalhanoğlu (yellow card) 79'; Zieliński 90', (yellow card) 90+2'	Report	Cambiaso 26'; Kalulu (yellow card) 32' (yellow-red card) 42'; Locatelli 83'	Stadium: San Siro; Attendance: 75,515; Referee: Federico La Penna

21 February 2026 26	Lecce	0–2	Internazionale	Lecce
18:00 CET (UTC+1)	Tiago Gabriel (yellow card) 17'	Report	De Vrij (yellow card) 10'; Mkhitaryan 75'; Akanji 82'; Bastoni (yellow card) 88'	Stadium: Stadio Via del mare Attendance: 26,868; Referee: Gianluca Manganiello

28 February 2026 27	Internazionale	2–0	Genoa	Milan
20:45 CET (UTC+1)	Mkhitaryan (yellow card) 21'; Dimarco 31'; Çalhanoğlu (yellow card) 65', (goal) 70' (pen.)	Report	Malinovskyi (yellow card) 9'	Stadium: San Siro; Attendance: 72,945; Referee: Michael Fabbri

8 March 2026 28	Milan	1–0	Internazionale	Milan
20:45 CET (UTC+1)	Estupiñán 35'; Rabiot (yellow card) 80'; Modrić (yellow card) 89'	Report	Bastoni (yellow card) 65'; Dumfries (yellow card) 69'	Stadium: San Siro; Attendance: 75,627; Referee: Daniele Doveri

14 March 2026 29	Internazionale	1–1	Atalanta	Milan
15:00 CET (UTC+1)	Sučić (yellow card) 21'; Esposito 26'; Carlos Augusto (yellow card) 59'	Report	Kolašinac (yellow card) 21'; Krstović 82'; De Ketelaere (yellow card) 90+5'	Stadium: San Siro; Attendance: 74,364; Referee: Gianluca Manganiello

22 March 2026 30	Fiorentina	1–1	Internazionale	Florence
20:45 CET (UTC+1)	Brescianini (yellow card) 56'; Ndour (yellow card) 62', (goal) 78'; Kean (yellow card) 66'	Report	Esposito 1'; Dimarco (yellow card) 43'; Carlos Augusto (yellow card) 45'; Barella (yellow card) 63'	Stadium: Stadio Artemio Franchi; Attendance: 22,335; Referee: Andrea Colombo

5 April 2026 31	Internazionale	5–2	Roma	Milan
20:45 CEST (UTC+2)	L. Martínez 2', 52'; Çalhanoğlu 45+2'; Thuram 55'; Barella 63'	Report	Mancini 40'; Pisilli (yellow card) 60'; Pellegrini 70'	Stadium: San Siro; Attendance: 75,267; Referee: Simone Sozza

12 April 2026 32	Como	3–4	Internazionale	Como
20:45 CEST (UTC+2)	Valle (yellow card) 24', (goal) 36'; Paz 45'; Diao (yellow card) 55'; Da Cunha 89' (pen.); Ramón (yellow card) 90+1'	Report	Thuram 45+1', 49'; Zieliński (yellow card) 53'; Dumfries 58', 72'; Çalhanoğlu (yellow card) 69'; Sučić (yellow card) 77'; Acerbi (yellow card) 79'; Carlos Augusto (yellow card) 83'; Bonny (yellow card) 87'; Akanji (yellow card) 90+1'	Stadium: Stadio Giuseppe Sinigaglia; Attendance: 11,975; Referee: Davide Massa

17 April 2026 33	Internazionale	3–0	Cagliari	Milan
20:45 CEST (UTC+2)	Thuram 52'; Barella 56'; Zieliński 90+2'	Report	S. Esposito (yellow card) 23'; Borrelli (yellow card) 25'	Stadium: San Siro; Attendance: 74,209; Referee: Matteo Marchetti

26 April 2026 34	Torino	2–2	Internazionale	Turin
18:00 CEST (UTC+2)	Simeone 70'; Vlašić 79' (pen.); Ebosse (yellow card) 85'	Report	Thuram 23'; Bisseck 61'; Diouf (yellow card) 84'; Barella (yellow card) 86'	Stadium: Stadio Olimpico Grande Torino; Attendance: 23,000; Referee: Maurizio Mariani

3 May 2026 35	Internazionale	2–0	Parma	Milan
20:45 CEST (UTC+2)	Thuram 45+1'; Zieliński (yellow card) 64'; Mkhitaryan 80'	Report		Stadium: San Siro; Attendance: 74,198; Referee: Kevin Bonacina

9 May 2026 36	Lazio	0–3	Internazionale	Rome
18:00 CEST (UTC+2)	Pellegrini (yellow card) 48'; Romagnoli (red card) 59'; Noslin (yellow card) 74'	Report	L. Martínez 6'; Sučić 39'; Mkhitaryan 76', (yellow card) 85'	Stadium: Stadio Olimpico; Attendance: 23,979; Referee: Rosario Abisso

17 May 2026 37	Internazionale	1–1	Hellas Verona	Milan
15:00 CEST (UTC+2)	Edmundsson 47' (o.g.)	Report	Valentini (yellow card) 60'; Gagliardini (yellow card) 89'; Bowie 90+1'	Stadium: San Siro; Attendance: 75,228; Referee: Andrea Calzavara

23 May 2026 38	Bologna	3–3	Internazionale	Bologna
18:00 CEST (UTC+2)	Bernardeschi 25'; Pobega 42'; Zieliński 48' (o.g.)	Report	Dimarco 22'; L. Martínez (yellow card) 41'; Esposito 64'; Mkhitaryan (yellow card) 77'; Diouf 86'	Stadium: Stadio Renato Dall'Ara; Attendance: 30,109; Referee: Kevin Bonacina

=== Coppa Italia ===
3 December 2025 Round of 16	Internazionale	5–1	Venezia	Milan
21:00 CET (UTC+1)	Diouf 18'; Esposito 20'; Thuram 34', 51'; Bonny 76'	Report	Korać (yellow card) 45'; Sagrado 66'	Stadium: San Siro; Attendance: 44,910; Referee: Davide Di Marco

4 February 2026 Quarter-finals	Internazionale	2–1	Torino	Monza
21:00 CET (UTC+1)	Bonny 35'; Diouf 47'; Sučić (yellow card) 71'; Kamate (yellow card) 79'; Esposito (yellow card) 83'	Report	Kulenović 57'; Maripán (yellow card) 87'	Stadium: Stadio Brianteo; Attendance: 12,038; Referee: Matteo Marchetti
Note: The match was played at Stadio Brianteo in Monza, instead of Inter's regular stadium, the San Siro in Milan, which was being used in preparations for the 2026 Winter Olympics opening ceremony.

3 March 2026 Semi-finals; First leg	Como	0–0	Internazionale	Como
21:00 CET (UTC+1)		Report		Stadium: Stadio Giuseppe Sinigaglia; Attendance: 10,324; Referee: Marco Di Bello

21 April 2026 Semi-finals; Second leg	Internazionale	3–2 (3–2 agg.)	Como	Milan
21:00 CEST (UTC+2)	Çalhanoğlu 69', 86'; Sučić 89'	Report	Baturina 32'; Da Cunha 47'; Perrone (yellow card) 90+4'	Stadium: San Siro; Attendance: 73,255; Referee: Simone Sozza

13 May 2026 Final	Lazio	0–2	Internazionale	Rome
21:00 CEST (UTC+2)	Gila (yellow card) 38'; Zaccagni (yellow card) 85'; Pedro (yellow card) 85'	Report	Bisseck (yellow card) 7'; Marušić 14' (o.g.); Bastoni (yellow card) 16'; L. Martínez 35'; Dimarco (yellow card) 85'; Barella (yellow card) 85'	Stadium: Stadio Olimpico; Attendance: 68,729; Referee: Marco Guida

=== Supercoppa Italiana ===
19 December 2025 Semi-finals	Bologna	1–1 (3–2 p)	Internazionale	Riyadh, Saudi Arabia
22:00 SAST (UTC+3)	Orsolini 35' (pen.)	Report	Thuram 2'	Stadium: King Saud University Stadium; Attendance: 16,591; Referee: Daniele Chiffi
	Penalties
	Ferguson (penalty scored); Moro (penalty missed); Miranda (penalty missed); Rowe (penalty scored); Immobile (penalty scored)		(penalty scored) L. Martínez; (penalty missed) Bastoni; (penalty missed) Barella; (penalty missed) Bonny; (penalty scored) De Vrij

=== UEFA Champions League ===
==== League phase ====
The league phase draw took place on 28 August 2025.

===== League phase table =====
Pos	Team	Pld	W	D	L	GF	GA	GD	Pts	Qualification
8	(The Football Association) Manchester City	8	5	1	2	15	9	+6	16	Advance to round of 16 (seeded)
9	(Royal Spanish Football Federation) Real Madrid	8	5	0	3	21	12	+9	15	Advance to knockout phase play-offs (seeded)
10	(Italian Football Federation) Inter Milan	8	5	0	3	15	7	+8	15	Advance to knockout phase play-offs (seeded)
11	(French Football Federation) Paris Saint-Germain	8	4	2	2	21	11	+10	14	Advance to knockout phase play-offs (seeded)
12	(The Football Association) Newcastle United	8	4	2	2	17	7	+10	14	Advance to knockout phase play-offs (seeded)

Source: UEFA
Rules for classification: League phase tiebreakers

===== Results summary =====
Overall								Home						Away					
Pld	W	D	L	GF	GA	GD	Pts	W	D	L	GF	GA	GD	W	D	L	GF	GA	GD
8	5	0	3	15	7	+8	15	2	0	2	6	5	+1	3	0	1	9	2	+7

Source: UEFA

===== Results by round =====
Round	1	2	3	4	5	6	7	8
Ground	A	H	A	H	A	H	H	A
Result	W	W	W	W	L	L	L	W
Position	7	4	3	3	4	6	14	10
Points	3	6	9	12	12	12	12	15

Source: UEFA
A = Away; H = Home; W = Win; D = Draw; L = Loss; P = Postponed

===== Matches =====
17 September 2025 1	Ajax (Netherlands)	0–2	(Italy) Internazionale	Amsterdam, Netherlands
21:00 CEST (UTC+2)	Baas (yellow card) 73'	Report	Thuram (yellow card) 17', (goal) 42', 47'; Mkhitaryan (yellow card) 67'	Stadium: Johan Cruyff Arena; Attendance: 52,288; Referee: Michael Oliver (England)

30 September 2025 2	Internazionale (Italy)	3–0	(Czech Republic) Slavia Prague	Milan, Italy
21:00 CEST (UTC+2)	L. Martínez 30', 65', (yellow card) 61'; Dumfries 34'; Bisseck (yellow card) 48'	Report	Schranz (yellow card) 56'	Stadium: San Siro; Attendance: 62,317; Referee: Chris Kavanagh (England)

21 October 2025 3	Union Saint-Gilloise (Belgium)	0–4	(Italy) Internazionale	Brussels, Belgium
21:00 CEST (UTC+2)	Schoofs (yellow card) 88'	Report	De Vrij (yellow card) 31'; Dumfries 41'; L. Martínez 45+1'; Çalhanoğlu 53' (pen.); Esposito 76'	Stadium: Constant Vanden Stock Stadium; Attendance: 16,632; Referee: Glenn Nyberg (Sweden)
Note: The match was played at Constant Vanden Stock Stadium in Brussels, instead of Union Saint-Gilloise's regular stadium, Joseph Marien Stadium, which did not meet UEFA requirements.

5 November 2025 4	Internazionale (Italy)	2–1	(Kazakhstan) Kairat	Milan, Italy
21:00 CET (UTC+1)	L. Martínez 45'; Barella (yellow card) 58'; Carlos Augusto 67'	Report	Jorginho (yellow card) 6'; Arad 55'	Stadium: San Siro; Attendance: 69,983; Referee: Luis Godinho (Portugal)

26 November 2025 5	Atlético Madrid (Spain)	2–1	(Italy) Internazionale	Madrid, Spain
21:00 CET (UTC+1)	Alvarez 9'; Giménez 90+3'	Report	Dimarco (yellow card) 44'; Zieliński 54'	Stadium: Metropolitano Stadium; Attendance: 68,069; Referee: François Letexier (France)

9 December 2025 6	Internazionale (Italy)	0–1	(England) Liverpool	Milan, Italy
21:00 CET (UTC+1)	L. Martínez (yellow card) 13'; Mkhitaryan (yellow card) 57'; Bastoni (yellow card) 87'	Report	Ekitike (yellow card) 39'; Jones (yellow card) 73'; Szoboszlai 88' (pen.)	Stadium: San Siro; Attendance: 73,892; Referee: Felix Zwayer (Germany)

20 January 2026 7	Internazionale (Italy)	1–3	(England) Arsenal	Milan, Italy
21:00 CET (UTC+1)	Sučić 18'; Bastoni (yellow card) 72'; Acerbi (yellow card) 82'	Report	Gabriel Jesus 10', 31'; Merino (yellow card) 72'; Gyökeres 84'; Rice (yellow card) 90+2'	Stadium: San Siro; Attendance: 72,649; Referee: João Pinheiro (Portugal)

28 January 2026 8	Borussia Dortmund (Germany)	0–2	(Italy) Internazionale	Dortmund, Germany
21:00 CET (UTC+1)	Bensebaini (yellow card) 75'	Report	Akanji (yellow card) 56'; Dimarco 81'; Acerbi (yellow card) 90+1'; Diouf 90+4'	Stadium: Westfalenstadion; Attendance: 81,365; Referee: István Kovács (Romania)

==== Knockout phase ====
===== Knockout phase play-offs =====
The knockout phase play-offs draw took place on 30 January 2026.

18 February 2026 First leg	Bodø/Glimt (Norway)	3–1	(Italy) Internazionale	Bodø, Norway
21:00 CET (UTC+1)	Fet 20'; Hauge 61'; Høgh 64'; Blomberg (yellow card) 77'	Report	Esposito 30', (yellow card) 45'	Stadium: Aspmyra Stadion; Attendance: 7,845; Referee: Daniel Siebert (Germany)

24 February 2026 Second leg	Internazionale (Italy)	1–2 (2–5 agg.)	(Norway) Bodø/Glimt	Milan, Italy
21:00 CET (UTC+1)	Bastoni 76'	Report	Hauge 58'; Gundersen (yellow card) 67'; Evjen 72'	Stadium: San Siro; Attendance: 70,441; Referee: Alejandro Hernández Hernández (Spain)

== Statistics ==
=== Appearances and goals ===
No.	Pos	Nat	Player	Total		Serie A		Coppa Italia		Supercoppa Italiana		Champions League	
No.	Pos	Nat	Player	Apps	Goals	Apps	Goals	Apps	Goals	Apps	Goals	Apps	Goals
Goalkeepers
1	GK	(Switzerland) SUI	Yann Sommer	43	0	33	0	0	0	0	0	10	0
12	GK	(Italy) ITA	Raffaele Di Gennaro	1	0	0+1	0	0	0	0	0	0	0
13	GK	(Spain) ESP	Josep Martínez	11	0	5	0	5	0	1	0	0	0
Defenders
2	DF	(Netherlands) NED	Denzel Dumfries	28	5	15+5	3	1+2	0	0	0	4+1	2
6	DF	(Netherlands) NED	Stefan de Vrij	17	0	8+3	0	2	0	1	0	3	0
15	DF	(Italy) ITA	Francesco Acerbi	25	0	14+3	0	3	0	0	0	5	0
25	DF	(Switzerland) SUI	Manuel Akanji	45	2	31+2	2	2	0	0	0	7+3	0
30	DF	(Brazil) BRA	Carlos Augusto	46	2	18+16	1	4+1	0	0	0	4+3	1
31	DF	(Germany) GER	Yann Aurel Bisseck	36	3	21+2	3	3+2	0	1	0	6+1	0
32	DF	(Italy) ITA	Federico Dimarco	47	8	30+5	7	2	0	1	0	8+1	1
36	DF	(Italy) ITA	Matteo Darmian	9	0	2+4	0	1	0	0	0	1+1	0
43	DF	(Italy) ITA	Matteo Cocchi	3	0	0+1	0	1+1	0	0	0	0	0
95	DF	(Italy) ITA	Alessandro Bastoni	40	2	28	1	2	0	1	0	8+1	1
Midfielders
7	MF	(Poland) POL	Piotr Zieliński	49	7	22+12	6	3+1	0	1	0	7+3	1
8	MF	(Croatia) CRO	Petar Sučić	50	4	21+13	2	3+2	1	0+1	0	4+6	1
11	MF	(Brazil) BRA	Luis Henrique	43	1	18+12	1	2+3	0	1	0	4+3	0
16	MF	(Italy) ITA	Davide Frattesi	33	0	3+19	0	3	0	0+1	0	3+4	0
17	MF	(France) FRA	Andy Diouf	29	4	4+15	1	3+2	2	0+1	0	0+4	1
20	MF	(Turkey) TUR	Hakan Çalhanoğlu	30	12	20+2	9	2	2	0	0	5+1	1
22	MF	(Armenia) ARM	Henrikh Mkhitaryan	39	4	16+14	4	1+3	0	1	0	4	0
23	MF	(Italy) ITA	Nicolò Barella	45	3	31+3	3	2	0	1	0	7+1	0
41	MF	(France) FRA	Issiaka Kamate	1	0	0	0	1	0	0	0	0	0
45	MF	(Italy) ITA	Leonardo Bovo	1	0	0	0	0+1	0	0	0	0	0
58	MF	(Slovenia) SLO	Luka Topalović	1	0	0+1	0	0	0	0	0	0	0
Forwards
9	FW	(France) FRA	Marcus Thuram	44	18	24+5	13	4+1	2	1	1	6+3	2
10	FW	(Argentina) ARG	Lautaro Martínez	41	22	27+3	17	1+1	1	0+1	0	7+1	4
14	FW	(Ivory Coast) CIV	Ange-Yoan Bonny	48	7	10+23	5	2+2	2	1	0	2+8	0
47	FW	(Italy) ITA	Matteo Spinaccè	1	0	0	0	0+1	0	0	0	0	0
48	FW	(Italy) ITA	Mattia Mosconi	2	0	0+2	0	0	0	0	0	0	0
53	FW	(Italy) ITA	Matteo Lavelli	1	0	0+1	0	0	0	0	0	0	0
94	FW	(Italy) ITA	Pio Esposito	48	10	15+20	7	2+2	1	0	0	5+4	2
Players loaned out during the season
5	DF	(France) FRA	Benjamin Pavard	1	0	1	0	0	0	0	0	0	0
42	DF	(Argentina) ARG	Tomás Palacios	0	0	0	0	0	0	0	0	0	0

Source: Competitions

=== Goalscorers ===
Rank	No.	Pos.	Player	Serie A	Coppa Italia	Supercoppa Italiana	Champions League	Total
1	10	FW	(Argentina) Lautaro Martínez	17	1	0	4	22
2	9	FW	(France) Marcus Thuram	13	2	1	2	18
3	20	MF	(Turkey) Hakan Çalhanoğlu	9	2	0	1	12
4	94	FW	(Italy) Pio Esposito	7	1	0	2	10
5	32	DF	(Italy) Federico Dimarco	7	0	0	1	8
6	7	MF	(Poland) Piotr Zieliński	6	0	0	1	7
6	14	FW	(Ivory Coast) Ange-Yoan Bonny	5	2	0	0	7
8	2	DF	(Netherlands) Denzel Dumfries	3	0	0	2	5
9	8	MF	(Croatia) Petar Sučić	2	1	0	1	4
9	17	MF	(France) Andy Diouf	1	2	0	1	4
9	22	MF	(Armenia) Henrikh Mkhitaryan	4	0	0	0	4
12	23	MF	(Italy) Nicolò Barella	3	0	0	0	3
12	31	DF	(Germany) Yann Aurel Bisseck	3	0	0	0	3
14	25	DF	(Switzerland) Manuel Akanji	2	0	0	0	2
14	30	DF	(Brazil) Carlos Augusto	1	0	0	1	2
14	95	DF	(Italy) Alessandro Bastoni	1	0	0	1	2
17	11	MF	(Brazil) Luis Henrique	1	0	0	0	1
Own goals				4	1	0	0	5
Totals				89	12	1	17	119

=== Assists ===
Rank	No.	Pos.	Player	Serie A	Coppa Italia	Supercoppa Italiana	Champions League	Total
1	32	DF	(Italy) Federico Dimarco	16	0	0	0	16
2	9	FW	(France) Marcus Thuram	7	1	0	1	9
3	23	MF	(Italy) Nicolò Barella	8	0	0	0	8
4	14	FW	(Ivory Coast) Ange-Yoan Bonny	4	0	0	3	7
4	20	MF	(Turkey) Hakan Çalhanoğlu	4	1	0	2	7
6	10	FW	(Argentina) Lautaro Martínez	6	0	0	0	6
6	94	FW	(Italy) Pio Esposito	4	0	0	2	6
6	95	DF	(Italy) Alessandro Bastoni	4	0	1	1	6
9	8	MF	(Croatia) Petar Sučić	3	2	0	0	5
10	7	MF	(Poland) Piotr Zieliński	3	1	0	0	4
11	2	DF	(Netherlands) Denzel Dumfries	1	1	0	0	2
11	11	MF	(Brazil) Luis Henrique	2	0	0	0	2
11	16	MF	(Italy) Davide Frattesi	0	2	0	0	2
11	22	MF	(Armenia) Henrikh Mkhitaryan	1	1	0	0	2
11	31	DF	(Germany) Yann Aurel Bisseck	2	0	0	0	2
16	15	DF	(Italy) Francesco Acerbi	1	0	0	0	1
16	30	DF	(Brazil) Carlos Augusto	1	0	0	0	1
16	41	MF	(France) Issiaka Kamate	0	1	0	0	1
16	58	MF	(Slovenia) Luka Topalović	1	0	0	0	1
Totals				68	10	1	8	87

=== Clean sheets ===
Rank	No.	Player	Serie A	Coppa Italia	Supercoppa Italiana	Champions League	Total
1	1	(Switzerland) Yann Sommer	15	0	0	4	19
2	13	(Spain) Josep Martínez	3	2	0	0	5
Totals			18	2	0	4	24

=== Disciplinary record ===
No.	Pos.	Player	Serie A			Coppa Italia			Supercoppa Italiana			Champions League			Total		
No.	Pos.	Player	Yellow card	(yellow card) (yellow-red card)	Red card	Yellow card	(yellow card) (yellow-red card)	Red card	Yellow card	(yellow card) (yellow-red card)	Red card	Yellow card	(yellow card) (yellow-red card)	Red card	Yellow card	(yellow card) (yellow-red card)	Red card
2	DF	(Netherlands) Denzel Dumfries	2	0	0	0	0	0	0	0	0	0	0	0	2	0	0
6	DF	(Netherlands) Stefan de Vrij	1	0	0	0	0	0	0	0	0	1	0	0	2	0	0
7	MF	(Poland) Piotr Zieliński	3	0	0	0	0	0	0	0	0	0	0	0	3	0	0
8	MF	(Croatia) Petar Sučić	5	0	0	1	0	0	0	0	0	0	0	0	6	0	0
9	FW	(France) Marcus Thuram	2	0	0	0	0	0	0	0	0	1	0	0	3	0	0
10	FW	(Argentina) Lautaro Martínez	4	0	0	0	0	0	0	0	0	2	0	0	6	0	0
11	MF	(Brazil) Luis Henrique	1	0	0	0	0	0	0	0	0	0	0	0	1	0	0
14	FW	(Ivory Coast) Ange-Yoan Bonny	1	0	0	0	0	0	0	0	0	0	0	0	1	0	0
15	DF	(Italy) Francesco Acerbi	3	0	0	0	0	0	0	0	0	2	0	0	5	0	0
17	MF	(France) Andy Diouf	1	0	0	0	0	0	0	0	0	0	0	0	1	0	0
20	MF	(Turkey) Hakan Çalhanoğlu	7	0	0	0	0	0	0	0	0	0	0	0	7	0	0
22	MF	(Armenia) Henrikh Mkhitaryan	5	0	0	0	0	0	0	0	0	2	0	0	7	0	0
23	MF	(Italy) Nicolò Barella	7	0	0	1	0	0	0	0	0	1	0	0	9	0	0
25	DF	(Switzerland) Manuel Akanji	4	0	0	0	0	0	0	0	0	1	0	0	5	0	0
30	DF	(Brazil) Carlos Augusto	6	0	0	0	0	0	0	0	0	0	0	0	6	0	0
31	DF	(Germany) Yann Aurel Bisseck	2	0	0	1	0	0	0	0	0	1	0	0	4	0	0
32	DF	(Italy) Federico Dimarco	3	0	0	1	0	0	0	0	0	1	0	0	5	0	0
41	MF	(France) Issiaka Kamate	0	0	0	1	0	0	0	0	0	0	0	0	1	0	0
94	FW	(Italy) Pio Esposito	1	0	0	1	0	0	0	0	0	1	0	0	2	0	0
95	DF	(Italy) Alessandro Bastoni	6	0	0	1	0	0	0	0	0	2	0	0	9	0	0
Totals			64	0	0	7	0	0	0	0	0	15	0	0	86	0	0

== Awards ==
=== Monthly awards ===
Serie A Player of the Month

Month	Winner	Ref.
December	(Argentina) Lautaro Martínez	
January	(Italy) Federico Dimarco	
April	(France) Marcus Thuram	
May	(Argentina) Lautaro Martínez	

Serie A Rising Star of the Month

Month	Winner	Ref.
October	(France) Ange-Yoan Bonny	

Serie A Coach of the Month

Month	Winner	Ref.
December	(Romania) Cristian Chivu	
January	(Romania) Cristian Chivu	

Serie A Goal of the Month

Month	Winner	Opponents	Date	Ref.
November	(Poland) Piotr Zieliński	Hellas Verona	2 November 2025	
April	(Turkey) Hakan Çalhanoğlu	Roma	5 April 2026	

=== Seasonal awards ===
Serie A Awards

Award	Winner	Ref.
Most Valuable Player	(Italy) Federico Dimarco	
Best Striker	(Argentina) Lautaro Martínez	
Coach of the Season	(Romania) Cristian Chivu	

Serie A top goalscorer

Player	Goals	Ref.
(Argentina) Lautaro Martínez	17	

Serie A Team of the Season

Pos.	Player	Ref.
DF	(Switzerland) Manuel Akanji	
DF	(Italy) Federico Dimarco	
MF	(Poland) Piotr Zieliński	
FW	(Argentina) Lautaro Martínez	
