= Koblar =

Koblar is a surname. Notable people with this surname include:

- Andreja Koblar (born 1971), Slovene biathlete
- France Koblar (1889–1975), Slovene literary historian, editor and translator
- Jernej Koblar (born 1971), Slovene alpine skier
- Luka Koblar (born 1999), Slovene footballer
