= Carlo Pelagatti =

Italian footballer (born 1989)

Personal information
- Date of birth: 8 January 1989 (age 37)
- Place of birth: Arezzo, Italy
- Height: 1.82 m (5 ft 11 1/2 in)
- Position: Defender

Team information
- Current team: Caldiero Terme
- Number: 13

Youth career
- Arezzo

Senior career*
Years	Team	Apps	(Gls)
2008–2010	Arezzo	2	(?)
2009–2010	→ Sangiovannese (loan)	7	(?)
2010–2013	San Marino	59	(4)
2013–2014	Bassano	32	(2)
2014–2015	Ascoli	31	(1)
2015–2016	Catania	26	(2)
2016–2018	Cittadella	54	(0)
2018–2019	Arezzo	36	(1)
2019–2022	Padova	71	(1)
2022–2023	Carrarese	32	(2)
2023–2025	Legnago	37	(1)
2025–	Caldiero Terme	39	(1)
- * Club domestic league appearances and goals as of 2 August 2026

Carlo Pelagatti (born 8 January 1989) is an Italian footballer who plays as a defender for Serie D club Caldiero Terme.

== Career ==
Pelagatti started his youth career with hometown club Arezzo.

In the 2009–10 season, he was sent on loan to Lega Pro Seconda Divisione club Sangiovannese.

Pelagatti departed Arezzo for San Marino in 2010.

He made his professional debut in Lega Pro for San Marino, on 2 September 2012, in a game against Como.

On 2 September 2013, Pelagatti was signed by Bassano together with Filippo Fondi. It was here that he would win the league title and the Supercoppa di Lega di Seconda Divisione in 2013–14.

On 26 July 2019, he signed a three-year contract with Padova.

On 29 July 2022, Pelagatti joined Carrarese on a one-year contract.

On 22 July 2023, he moved to Legnago.

Pelagatti spent two seasons with the club, before joining Caldiero Terme in 2025.
