= Mattia Morello =

Italian footballer (born 1999)

Personal information
- Date of birth: 21 July 1999 (age 27)
- Place of birth: Treviglio, Italy
- Height: 1.70 m (5 ft 7 in)
- Position: Winger

Team information
- Current team: Legnago
- Number: 7

Youth career
- Pergolettese

Senior career*
Years	Team	Apps	(Gls)
2017–2022	Pergolettese	150	(28)
2022–2024	Fiorenzuola	60	(6)
2024–2025	Clodiense	13	(0)
2025–	Legnago	0	(0)
- * Club domestic league appearances and goals as of 4 January 2025

Mattia Morello (born 21 July 1999) is an Italian professional footballer who plays as a winger for Serie D club Legnago.

== Club career ==
Born in Treviglio, Morello started his career in Pergolettese youth system, and was promoted to the first team in 2017. He was part of the promotion to Serie C in 2019.

On 20 July 2022, Morello signed a two-year contract with Fiorenzuola.

== Honours ==
Pergolettese

- Serie D (Group D): 2018–19
