= Luca Zanetti =

Italian footballer

Personal information
- Date of birth: 9 November 2002 (age 24)
- Place of birth: Italy
- Position: Defender

Team information
- Current team: Caldiero
- Number: 20

Youth career
- Legnago

Senior career*
Years	Team	Apps	(Gls)
2019–2026	Legnago	105	(5)
2026–	Caldiero	13	(1)
- * Club domestic league appearances and goals as of 2 August 2026

Luca Zanetti (born 9 November 2002) is an Italian professional footballer who plays as a defender for Serie D club Caldiero.

== Club career ==
Formed on Legnago Salus, Zanetti made his senior and Serie D debut on 1 September 2019 against Villafranca.

After won the promotion with the club, made his professional and Serie C debut on 9 December 2020 against Fano.
