= Carlos Augusto (footballer) =

Brazilian footballer (born 1999)

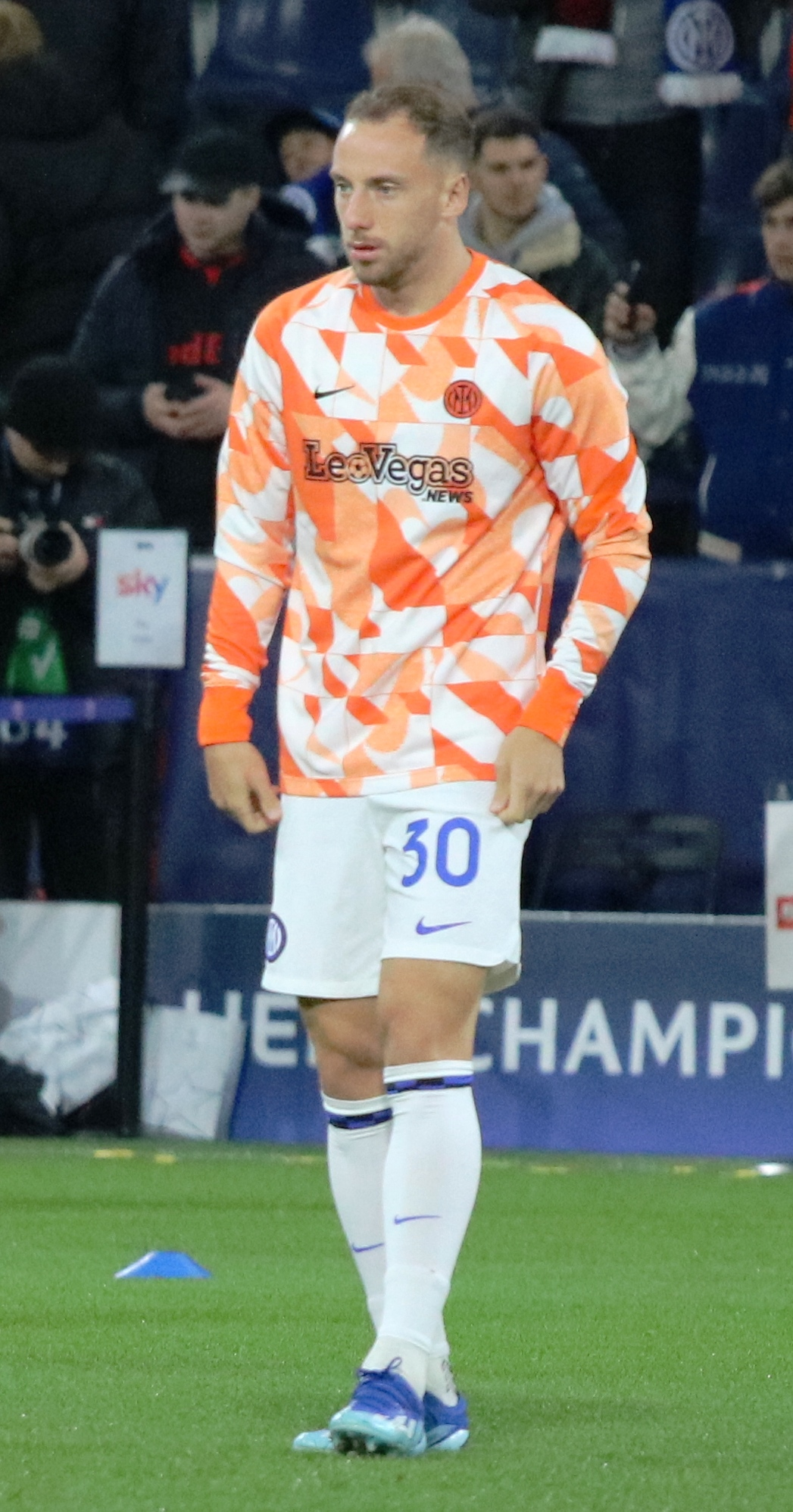
- Carlos Augusto with Inter Milan in 2023

Personal information
- Full name: Carlos Augusto Zopolato Neves
- Date of birth: 7 January 1999 (age 27)
- Place of birth: Campinas, São Paulo, Brazil
- Height: 1.84 m (6 ft 0 in)
- Positions: Left-back; left midfielder; centre-back

Team information
- Current team: Inter Milan
- Number: 30

Youth career
- 2011–2018: Corinthians

Senior career*
Years	Team	Apps	(Gls)
2018–2020	Corinthians	32	(1)
2020–2024	Monza	97	(11)
2023–2024	→ Inter Milan (loan)	37	(0)
2024–	Inter Milan	73	(6)

International career^{‡}
2018–2019	Brazil U20	6	(0)
2023–	Brazil	4	(0)
- * Club domestic league appearances and goals as of 22 November 2026 ‡ National team caps and goals as of 14 October 2025

Carlos Augusto Zopolato Neves (born 7 January 1999), known as Carlos Augusto (Brazilian Portuguese: [ˈkaʁlʊz awˈɡustu]), is a Brazilian professional footballer who plays as a left-back or left midfielder for Serie A club Inter Milan and the Brazil national team. A versatile defender known for his crossing, he can also operate as a centre-back.

== Club career ==
=== Corinthians ===
Carlos started his career when he was 12 years old at Corinthians. He was part of the 2017 Copa São Paulo de Futebol Júnior squad that ended up as champion.

Coming through the youth system, Carlos made his professional debut for Corinthians in a friendly against Grêmio on 8 July 2018. He made his official debut as a starter against Athletico Paranaense on 4 August of the same year. Carlos played 32 official games for Corinthians, scoring one goal. He also won the Campeonato Paulista twice: in 2018 and 2019.

=== Monza ===
On 28 August 2020, Carlos joined newly-promoted Serie B side Monza on a permanent deal. He scored his first goal on 12 December 2020, in a 2–0 win over Venezia away from home. He became the youngest defender in the 2020–21 Serie B season to score a long-range goal to date. Carlos scored his second goal on 22 December, in a 2–0 win at home against Ascoli. Carlos was nominated in the Serie B Team of the Season, finishing the season with three goals and two assists.

Carlos began the 2021–22 season by scoring against Cittadella in the first round of the 2021–22 Coppa Italia on 14 August 2021; the match ended in a 2–1 defeat. He was key to helping Monza gain their first promotion to Serie A, after winning the promotion play-off final against Pisa.

Carlos made his Serie A debut on 13 August 2022, as a starter in a 2–1 defeat to Torino in the 2022–23 season. He scored his first Serie A goal on 9 October, in a 2–0 home win against Spezia. Carlos finished the season with six goals and five assists.

=== Inter Milan ===
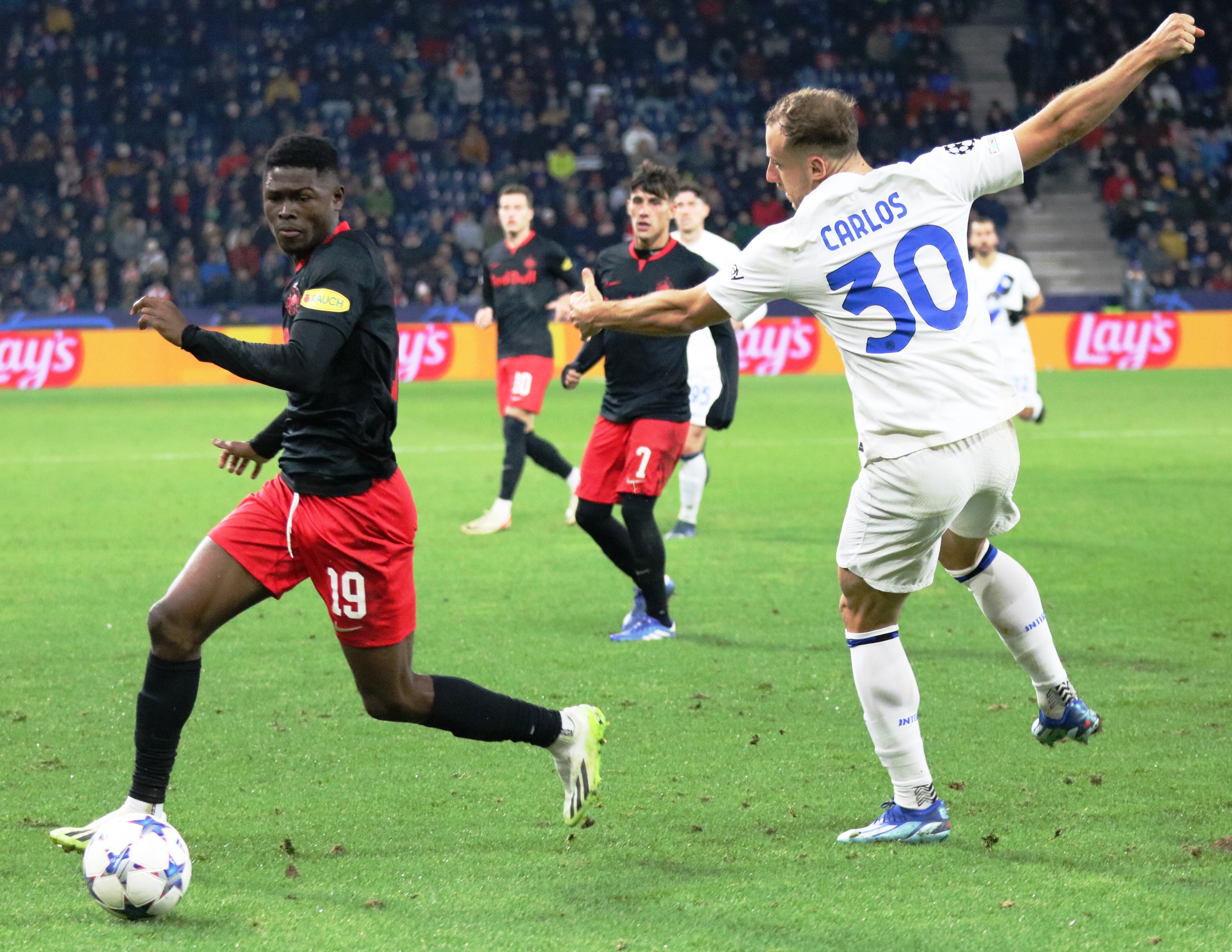
Carlos Augusto in action with Inter during a UEFA Champions League match against Red Bull Salzburg in November 2023

On 15 August 2023, Carlos joined Inter Milan on a one-year loan with an option and conditional obligation to buy. On 20 December 2023, Carlos scored his first goal for the Nerazzurri in a 1–2 defeat against Bologna in the round of 16 of the Coppa Italia.

== International career ==
On 13 December 2018, Carlos was included in the Brazil U20 squad for the 2019 South American U-20 Championship.

On 6 October 2023, Carlos was called up to the senior national team, and made his debut on 17 October 2023, in the 2026 FIFA World Cup qualification match lost 2–0 against Uruguay.

== Style of play ==
Although he initially played as a forward at age 15, Carlos struggled to adapt to the role. His positioning shifted during his tenure with the under-17 team, when he began playing as a wide midfielder. Primarily a left-back, he is also capable of operating as a centre-back in both three- and four-man defensive lines. Known for his aerial ability and defensive prowess, Carlos also possesses strong attacking qualities, particularly his crossing accuracy. Consequently, he has been described as "ideal for Italian football".

== Personal life ==
Carlos holds an Italian passport through his great-grandparents. He is affectionately nicknamed "l'Imperatore" (the Emperor) by Monza fans, in reference to Roman emperor Augustus.

== Career statistics ==
=== Club ===
As of match played 21 October 2026

Appearances and goals by club, season and competition
Club	Season	League			State league (Note: Includes Campeonato Paulista)		National cup (Note: Includes Copa do Brasil, Coppa Italia)		Continental		Other		Total	
Club	Season	Division	Apps	Goals	Apps	Goals	Apps	Goals	Apps	Goals	Apps	Goals	Apps	Goals
Corinthians	2018	Série A	7	0	0	0	0	0	1 (Note: Appearance(s) in Copa Sudamericana)	0	—		8	0
Corinthians	2019	Série A	15	1	2	0	2	0	2	0	—		21	1
Corinthians	2020	Série A	0	0	8	0	—		0	0	—		8	0
Corinthians	Total		22	1	10	0	2	0	3	0	—		37	1
Monza	2020–21	Serie B	30	3	—		1	0	—		2 (Note: Appearances in Serie B promotion play-offs)	0	33	3
Monza	2021–22	Serie B	32	2	—		1	1	—		4	0	37	3
Monza	2022–23	Serie A	35	6	—		2	0	—		—		37	6
Monza	Total		97	11	—		4	1	—		6	0	107	12
Inter Milan (loan)	2023–24	Serie A	37	0	—		1	1	7 (Note: Appearances in UEFA Champions League)	0	1 (Note: Appearance in Supercoppa Italiana)	0	46	1
Inter Milan	2024–25	Serie A	29	3	—		2	0	13	0	6 (Note: Two appearances in Supercoppa Italiana, four appearances in FIFA Club World Cup)	0	50	3
Inter Milan	2025–26	Serie A	34	1	—		5	0	7	1	0	0	46	2
Inter Milan	2026–27	Serie A	5	2	—		0	0	2	2	0	0	7	4
Inter Milan	Inter total		105	6	—		8	1	29	3	7	0	149	10
Career total			224	18	10	0	14	2	32	3	13	0	293	23

=== International ===
As of match played 14 October 2025

Appearances and goals by national team and year
National team	Year	Apps	Goals
Brazil	2023	2	0
Brazil	2025	2	0
Total		4	0

== Honours ==
Corinthians

- Campeonato Paulista: 2018, 2019
- Copa do Brasil runner-up: 2018

Inter Milan

- Serie A: 2023–24, 2025–26
- Coppa Italia: 2025–26
- Supercoppa Italiana: 2023
- UEFA Champions League runner-up: 2024–25

Individual

- Serie B Team of the Season: 2020–21
