= Alessandro Milani =

Venezuelan footballer (born 2006)

Personal information
- Full name: Alessandro Milani Scalchi
- Date of birth: 14 June 2005 (age 21)
- Place of birth: Latina, Lazio, Italy
- Height: 1.78 m (5 ft 10 in)
- Position: Left-back

Team information
- Current team: Inter Milan U23
- Number: 78

Youth career
- –2018: Polisportiva Carso
- 2018–2025: Lazio

Senior career*
Years	Team	Apps	(Gls)
2025–2026	Lazio	0	(0)
2025–2026	→ Avellino (loan)	14	(0)
2026–	Inter Milan U23	0	(0)

International career^{‡}
2021–2022	Italy U17	11	(0)
2022–2023	Italy U18	6	(0)
2023	Italy U19	2	(0)
2025	Venezuela U20	4	(0)
2025–	Venezuela	3	(0)
- * Club domestic league appearances and goals as of 20 July 2026 ‡ National team caps and goals as of 18 November 2025

Alessandro Milani Scalchi (born 14 June 2005) is a footballer who plays as a left-back for Serie C Group A club Inter Milan U23. Born in Italy, he plays for the Venezuela national team.

== Club career ==
=== Early years ===
Milani began his youth career at local side Polisportiva Carso, before joining Lazio in 2018. He progressed through the ranks and became a regular for the Primavera squad.

=== Lazio ===
On 5 December 2024, Milani was included in the first team squad for the first time after being named on the bench for Lazio's Coppa Italia match against Napoli. Milani was also included in the squad for the UEFA Europa League matches against Ludogorets Razgrad and Viktoria Plzeň, but did not play.

==== Loan to Avellino ====
On 3 July 2025, it was announced that Milani had joined Serie B side Avellino on a season-long loan. On 24 August, he made his professional debut for Avellino in Serie B, coming on as a substitute in a 2–0 loss to Frosinone.

=== Inter Milan U23 ===
On 24 July 2026, Milani joined Inter Milan on a permanent basis, and was assigned to their reserve team.

== International career ==
Milani was born in Italy to an Italian father and a Venezuelan mother. He represented Italy at various youth levels, including the U17, U18, and U19 teams. In 2025, he opted to represent Venezuela at the U20 level, making four appearances in international youth competitions. Milani was included in the Venezuelan squad for the 2025 South American U-20 Championship. On 26 May 2025, he was called up to Venezuela's senior side for the 2026 FIFA World Cup qualifiers.

== Career statistics ==
=== Club ===
As of match played 14 August 2026

Appearances and goals by club, season and competition
Club	Season	League			Cup		Europe		Other		Total	
Club	Season	Division	Apps	Goals	Apps	Goals	Apps	Goals	Apps	Goals	Apps	Goals
Lazio	2024–25	Serie A	0	0	0	0	0	0	—		0	0
Avellino (loan)	2025–26	Serie B	14	0	1	0	—		—		15	0
Inter Milan U23	2026–27	Serie C	0	0	—		—		1 (Note: Appearance(s) in Coppa Italia Serie C)	0	1	0
Career total			14	0	1	0	0	0	1	0	16	0

=== International ===
As of match played 18 November 2025

Appearances and goals by national team and year
National team	Year	Apps	Goals
Venezuela	2025	3	0
Total		3	0
