= Calcio Caldiero Terme =

Italian football club

Caldiero Terme
- Full name: Calcio Caldiero Terme srl
- Nicknames: Termali (Thermals); Gialloverdi (The yellow and greens)
- Founded: 1934; 92 years ago
- Ground: Stadio Mario Berti, Caldiero, Italy
- Capacity: 1,200
- Chairman: Filippo Berti
- Manager: Cristian Soave
- League: Serie D
- 2024–25: Serie C Group A, 19th of 20 (relegated)
- Website: https://www.asdcalciocaldieroterme.it/
Home colours	Away colours	Third colours

Calcio Caldiero Terme, commonly known as Caldiero Terme or just Caldiero, is an Italian association football club located in Caldiero, Veneto. Their colours are yellow and green, and they are currently playing in the Serie D.

== History ==
The club was founded in 1934 as Libertas Caldiero. Throughout its history, Caldiero Terme played mostly in the amateur regional leagues of Veneto, reaching Eccellenza for the first time in the 1990s. In 2004, the club was acquired by the Berti family (who sponsored it since 1989), guiding it to a historical first promotion to Serie D in 2019.

On 5 May 2024, Caldiero Terme won the Serie D Group B title, thus gaining a spot in Serie C for the following season, earning the club's first experience in professional football.

== Current squad ==
As of 3 February 2026

Note: Flags indicate national team as defined under FIFA eligibility rules; some limited exceptions apply. Players may hold more than one non-FIFA nationality.

No.	Pos.	Nation	Player
1	GK	TUN	Thomas Zouaghi
3	DF	ITA	Giacomo Ruggeri
4	MF	ITA	Andrea Viviani
5	MF	ITA	Edoardo Furini
6	MF	CMR	Georges Petdji Tsila
7	FW	ITA	Lorenzo Zerbato
9	MF	ARG	Patricio Goglino (on loan from Torres)
10	FW	ITA	Mattia Mauri
11	MF	ITA	Filippo Liberati
12	GK	ITA	Ettore Vanti
13	DF	ITA	Carlo Pelagatti
14	MF	ITA	Alberto Locati

No.	Pos.	Nation	Player
15	DF	ITA	Pietro Gecchele
16	DF	ITA	Andrew Afful Amoh
19	FW	ITA	Thomas Orfeini
20	MF	ITA	Luca Zanetti
21	MF	ITA	Federico Zazzi
22	GK	ITA	Joel Malusà
23	DF	ITA	Nicolo Baldani
26	DF	ITA	Tommaso Gentile
27	DF	ITA	Elia Caneva
67	FW	ITA	Salvatore Parisi
72	DF	ITA	Massimo Zappa
