= Daniele Quieto =

Venezuelan footballer (born 2005)

Personal information
- Full name: Daniele Quieto Aponte
- Date of birth: 22 October 2005 (age 21)
- Place of birth: Venice, Italy
- Height: 1.70 m (5 ft 7 in)
- Position: Midfielder

Team information
- Current team: Cosenza

Youth career
- –2019: Venezia
- 2019–2025: Inter Milan

Senior career*
Years	Team	Apps	(Gls)
2025–2026	Inter Milan	0	(0)
2025–2026	→ Latina (loan)	18	(0)
2026–	Cosenza	0	(0)

International career^{‡}
2021–2022	Italy U17	9	(0)
2022–2023	Italy U18	6	(0)
2023–2024	Italy U19	4	(0)
2025–	Venezuela U20	5	(0)
- * Club domestic league appearances and goals as of 1 May 2026 ‡ National team caps and goals as of 1 February 2025

Daniele Quieto Aponte (born 22 October 2005) is a professional footballer who plays as a midfielder for Serie C Group C club Cosenza. Born in Italy, he represents Venezuela at youth level.

== Early life ==
Quieto was born on 22 October 2005 in Venice, Italy. He is of Venezuelan descent through his mother. He has a brother. He has regarded Brazil international Ronaldinho as his football idol.

== Club career ==
As a youth player, Quieto joined the youth academy of hometown club Venezia. In 2019, he joined the youth academy of Serie A side Inter. He played for the club's first team during their summer 2024 pre-season.

On 6 August 2025, Quieto made his first professional move by joining Serie C side Latina on a season-long loan.

On 10 August 2026, Quieto joined Serie C club Cosenza on a permanent basis.

== International career ==
Quieto was an Italy youth international. He has played for the Italy under-17, under-18 and the under-19 teams. He made nine appearances for the under-17s, six for the under-18s, and four for the under-19 team.

In January 2025, FIFA approved his request to switch allegiance to Venezuela.

== Style of play ==
Quieto mainly operates as a midfielder. He specifically operates as an attacking midfielder. He can also operate as a left-winger and as a second striker. He is right-footed. He has been described as a "classic attacking midfielder, with a stocky build and a lightning-fast dribbling ability in tight spaces... loves to receive the ball and catalyze his team’s offensive play".
