= FC Legnago Salus =

Italian football club

Legnago Salus
- Full name: Football Club Legnago Salus s.r.l.
- Founded: 1921; 105 years ago
- Ground: Stadio Mario Sandrini, Legnago, Italy
- Capacity: 2,152
- Chairman: Davide Venturato
- Manager: Massimo Bagatti
- League: Serie D
- 2024–25: Serie C Group B, 20th of 20
Home colours	Away colours

Football Club Legnago Salus (formerly Associazione Calcio Legnago Salus) is an Italian football club based in Legnago, Veneto.

It currently plays in Serie D, the fourth-highest division in the Italian football league system.

== History ==
The club was founded in 1921 and changed its name many times.

In 1945–46 season Legnago won its Serie C group, but lost the promotional play-off that would have given it access to the Serie B championship. The club played in the IV Serie (now called Serie D) during three different periods: from 1952 to 1954, then from 1971 to 1980, and from 1993 to 2002.

In the 1971–72 Serie D season, Legnago ended the championship in second place and gained access to the promotion playoffs, then lost 1–0 to Vigevano. The match was played at Stadio Mario Rigamonti in Brescia in front of 7,000 spectators.

In the season 1994–95, Legnago ended in third place behind Treviso and Triestina with Gigi Manganotti as manager. On 30 November 1997 Legnago signed the record number of 1,200 spectators attending the match versus Trento.

After a long period in Serie D, the club relegated to Eccellenza in 2002 and Promozione one year later.

In the 2006–07 season Legnago won the Promozione league and gained promotion to Eccellenza Lombardy.

In the 2009–10 season Legnago won the Eccellenza Lombardy league and gained promotion to Serie D.

=== F.C. Legnago Salus SSD ===
On 30 June 2011, A.C. Legnago Salus changed its denomination to F.C. Legnago Salus SSD.

In the 2011–12 season the club gained access to the semifinal of Serie D promotion play-off, where it was eliminated by SandonàJesolo.

In the 2019–20 season, Legnago ended in second place behind Campodarsego, being successively admitted to Serie C due to the latter's renouncing to promotion.

== Players ==
=== Current squad ===
As of 4 July 2025

Note: Flags indicate national team as defined under FIFA eligibility rules; some limited exceptions apply. Players may hold more than one non-FIFA nationality.

No.	Pos.	Nation	Player
1	GK	ITA	Andrea Rigon
2	DF	MDA	Daniel Tonica
4	DF	ARG	Gregorio Tanco
5	DF	SLO	Luka Koblar
7	FW	ITA	Mattia Morello
8	MF	ITA	Enrico Casarotti
11	DF	ITA	Luca Zanetti
12	GK	ITA	Leonardo Bajari
17	FW	MDA	Serghei Tomaili
19	MF	CIV	Aboubakar Diaby
20	DF	ITA	Ousmane Banse
21	DF	ITA	Giacomo Ruggeri
23	DF	ITA	Vincenzo Muteba

No.	Pos.	Nation	Player
25	MF	ITA	Francesco Bombagi
26	DF	ITA	Mario Noce
27	DF	ITA	Federico Ampollini
29	MF	ITA	Marco Gazzola
32	DF	ITA	Gianmaria Zanandrea
73	DF	ITA	Luciano Ballan
90	FW	ITA	Vincenzo Vitale
91	GK	ITA	Filippo Perucchini
—	FW	ITA	Alessandro Rossi

=== Out on loan ===
Note: Flags indicate national team as defined under FIFA eligibility rules; some limited exceptions apply. Players may hold more than one non-FIFA nationality.

No.	Pos.	Nation	Player
—	GK	ITA	Marco Businarolo (at Vigasio until 30 June 2025)
—	DF	ITA	Martino Travaglini (at Campodarsego until 30 June 2025)
—	MF	ITA	Giacomo Balbo (at Oppeano until 30 June 2025)
—	MF	IRL	Olamide Ibrahim (at Portogruaro until 30 June 2025)

No.	Pos.	Nation	Player
—	MF	ITA	Thomas Lonardoni (at Vigasio until 30 June 2025)
—	MF	ITA	Andrea Sternieri (at Villa Valle until 30 June 2025)
—	FW	ITA	Giovanni Cogo (at Este until 30 June 2025)
