= Cosenza Calcio =

Italian football club

Cosenza
- Full name: Cosenza Calcio
- Nicknames: Lupi (Wolves); Rossoblù (Red-blues); Silani ("silans", for the name of the area where the city is located, "Sila")
- Founded: 1926; 100 years ago
- Ground: Stadio San Vito-Gigi Marulla
- Capacity: 20,987
- Owner: Eugenio Guarascio
- Chairman: Eugenio Guarascio
- Manager: Federico Coppitelli
- League: Serie C Group C
- 2025–26: Serie C Group C, 4th of 20
- Website: ilcosenza.it
Home colours	Away colours

Cosenza Calcio is an Italian football club, based in Cosenza, Calabria. Currently the team plays in Serie C Group C.

== History ==
=== Cosenza Calcio ===
The club was founded in 1926 as "Cosenza Foot-Ball Club" (the year 1914 is a reference to the first historic match played in the town of Cosenza on 23 February 1914) and enjoyed a long time in the professional leagues, spending several years in the Serie B. They also won the Anglo-Italian Cup in 1983. In 2003, Cosenza 1914 was expelled from professional league.

In 2003 an illegitimate phoenix club was founded as A.S. Cosenza F.C. In 2004, old Cosenza won the appeal and was admitted to 2004–05 Serie D. Thus that season there was a derby. In 2005 new Cosenza switched its denomination into A.S. Cosenza Calcio, after the fall of old Cosenza.

=== Cosenza Calcio 1914 Srl ===
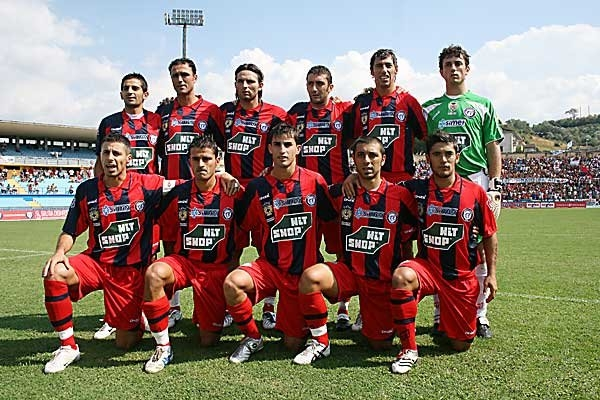
Cosenza lineup in 2008–09

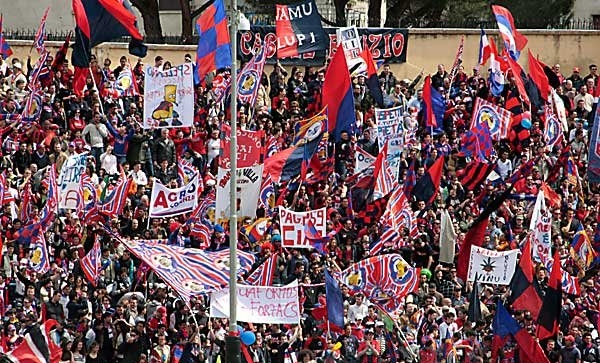
Tifosi in May 2008

In 2007, A.S. Cosenza Calcio gave up its Serie D membership, but all the team players later joined new club Fortitudo Cosenza, born as relocation of Rende Calcio, a team from the neighbouring city of Rende which was relegated to Serie D in 2006–07 season and moved to Cosenza soon after. The new club quickly managed to win the Serie D/Girone I championship in 2007–08, ensuring a place back into the Lega Pro Seconda Divisione (the renamed Serie C2) for the 2008–09 season.

==== Three seasons in professionalism ====
Following this, the new club renamed itself, taking the old historical denomination of Cosenza Calcio 1914 S.r.l. with the aim to rise up the Italian football pyramid. In 2008–09, their first season in the Lega Pro, Cosenza showed all of their intentions by winning the Lega Pro Seconda Divisione/Girone C championship. The team played the 2009–10 season in the Lega Pro Prima Divisione/Girone B, finishing 11th in the table.

At the end of the 2010–11 Lega Pro Prima Divisione season the team was relegated after losing the playoff. The team was then excluded from professional Championship by Co.Vi.So.C. of Italian Football Federation and it didn't appeal.

During the professional seasons, former chairman Damiano Paletta was suspended in June 2009 for 6 months for irregularities in administration. The ban was reduced after an appeal.

For the bankruptcy of Cosenza Calcio 1914 S.r.l., former managers Eugenio Funari, Paolo Pagliuso (former chairman) and his son Luca Pagliuso, Giuseppe Citrigno and Francesco Iannucci were banned from football for 2 years to 5 years. due to irregularities in management.

In 2013 the membership of Cosenza Calcio 1914 S.r.l. was finally revoked.

=== Nuova Cosenza Calcio ===
In mid-2011 the club was refounded as Nuova Cosenza Calcio and restarted from Serie D After a mediocre start, they sacked coach Enzo Patania and hired Tommaso Napoli. They won nine and drew seven without a loss to finish the regular season in second place to HinterReggio in Group I and entered in the promotion playoffs. They won six in a row to become champions of the playoffs. The club won the promotion playoffs by beating SandonàJesoloCalcio 3–2 in the final, but not being automatically promoted shall remain still in Serie D.

On 5 August 2013, the team announced that it was promoted to the professional league, Lega Pro Seconda Divisione. Circa 2013 the club refer itself simply as Cosenza Calcio, a name change in Italian Chamber of Commerce was done some time later.

Cosenza was promoted again to the unified 2014–15 Lega Pro after ending the 2013–14 Lega Pro Seconda Divisione season in fourth place. The team mathematically secured the promotion in March 2014.

In 2018, Cosenza promoted to Serie B.

== Culture ==
=== Supporters ===
The Cosenza ultras are notable within Italian football for maintaining a consistent left-wing and anti-fascist identity, in contrast to many other Italian clubs whose supporters skew to the right.

The political character of Cosenza's supporters dates back to the emergence of its ultra culture in the 1980s. The influence of the extra-parliamentary left was strong from the outset, reflected in the names adopted by early groups (fedayn, front line, ultras), with the movement taking the form of a left-wing rebel spontaneism with Anarchist traits, organised without formal hierarchies or leaders. The Cosenza ultras avow a left-wing anarchism and see themselves as opponents of political corruption in their own city and as a resistance to neo-fascism and "territorial discrimination" against the Mezzogiorno.

This political identity has been expressed through social action; In 1986, ultras volunteered to establish a soup kitchen, the Franciscan cenacle, which became a daily meeting point serving the city's most destitute. The Cosenza ultras squatted buildings confiscated from the mafia, providing accommodation for hundreds of immigrants and destitute Italians, opened a food bank for the poor, and created Italy's first play-park for disabled children. The ultras also occupied the first social centre in the city, eventually securing a permanent space known as the Gramna, home to a boxing gym, a community publishing house, and other associations. Claudio Dionesalvi, one of the founders of the Cosenza ultra group "New Guard" in 1986, has described how the Cosenza supporters sought to offer an alternative to the dominant political trends of the time, generating significant forms of existential revolt in a city shaped by clientelism, organised crime and political corruption. An internationalist dimension is also present at Cosenza: the curva has welcomed Kurdish refugees and displayed flags of the Kurdistan Workers' Party and Abdullah Ocalan, under the banner "a land without borders for a curve with a thousand flags".

=== Colors and badge ===
The team's official colours are red and dark blue, probably in honor to Genoa C.F.C.

== Players ==
=== First-team squad ===
As of 1 September 2026

Note: Flags indicate national team as defined under FIFA eligibility rules; some limited exceptions apply. Players may hold more than one non-FIFA nationality.

No.	Pos.	Nation	Player
2	DF	ITA	Baldovino Cimino
3	MF	ITA	Enrico Giannini
4	DF	ROU	Răzvan Pașcalău
5	MF	ITA	Nicolò Contiliano
6	MF	GAM	Abdoulie Ndow (on loan from Spezia)
7	MF	IRL	Ed McJannet (on loan from Lecce)
9	FW	FRA	Sofiane Achour
10	FW	ITA	Antonio Energe (on loan from Crotone)
11	FW	ITA	Mattia Almaviva
12	GK	BUL	Velizar-Iliya Iliev (on loan from Cagliari)
13	DF	ITA	Andrea Cogoni
14	MF	VEN	Daniele Quieto
15	MF	ITA	Antonio D'Alena
17	FW	CRO	Tomi Petrović (on loan from Juve Stabia)

No.	Pos.	Nation	Player
21	MF	ITA	Diego Ragone
22	GK	ITA	Carmelo Rantuccio
26	DF	ITA	Paolo Dametto
29	MF	ITA	Filippo Palazzino
33	DF	ITA	Alessandro Dalmazzi
41	MF	ITA	Edoardo Contiero
47	DF	ITA	Antonio Barone
77	FW	ITA	Alessandro Pozzi
97	DF	ITA	Lucio Bonofiglio
99	DF	ITA	Pietro Ciotti
—	GK	ITA	Matteo Rizzo
—	DF	ITA	Gianluca Clemente
—	MF	NED	Orhan Džepar
—	MF	ITA	Riccardo Palmieri

=== Out on loan ===
Note: Flags indicate national team as defined under FIFA eligibility rules; some limited exceptions apply. Players may hold more than one non-FIFA nationality.

No.	Pos.	Nation	Player
—	DF	ITA	Antonio Rocco (at Virtus Francavilla until 30 June 2027)

== Coaching staff ==
Position	Name
Head coach	(Italy) Massimiliano Alvini
Assistant coach	(Italy) Renato Montagnolo
Technical assistant	(Italy) Daniele Portanova
Goalkeeper coach	(Italy) Antonio Fischetti (Italy) Francesco Spingola
Fitness coach	(Italy) Claudio Giuntoli
Rehab coach	(Italy) Giuseppe Ruffolo (Italy) Giuseppe Managò
Match analyst	(Italy) Alessandro Imbrogno (Italy) Emilio Scola

== Honours ==
- Coppa Italia Lega Pro: 2014–15
- Serie D: 1958–59
