= Alessandro Dalmazzi =

Italian footballer (born 1994)

Personal information
- Date of birth: 3 August 1994 (age 32)
- Place of birth: Orbetello, Italy
- Height: 1.85 m (6 ft 1 in)
- Position: Centre-back

Team information
- Current team: Cosenza
- Number: 33

Youth career
- Grosseto

Senior career*
Years	Team	Apps	(Gls)
2013–2014	Grosseto	1	(0)
2014	→ Viterbese (loan)		
2014–2016	Viterbese	23	(1)
2016–2018	Rieti	26	(0)
2018–2019	Notaresco	34	(1)
2019–2022	Campobasso	83	(2)
2022–2023	Fidelis Andria	36	(4)
2023–2025	Lumezzane	62	(2)
2025–2026	Sambenedettese	30	(1)
2026–	Cosenza	2	(0)
- * Club domestic league appearances and goals as of 29 August 2026

Alessandro Dalmazzi (born 3 August 1994) is an Italian professional footballer who plays as a centre-back for Serie C Group C club Cosenza.

== Career ==
Born in Orbetello, Dalmazzi started his career in Grosseto. He was promoted to the first team in 2013–14 season, and made his professional debut on Serie B on 18 May 2013 against Bari.

In 2014, he was loaned to Eccellenza club Viterbese. After won the promotion, he joined permanently to the club.

On 24 August 2016, he moved to Rieti.

On 9 July 2019, he joined to Campobasso. The club won the promotion to Serie C in 2020–21 Serie D season. Dalmazzi made his Serie C debut on 29 August against Avellino.

On 27 August 2022, Dalmazzi signed with Fidelis Andria.

== Honours ==
Viterbese

- Serie D: 2015–16
