= Mattia Mosconi =

Italian footballer (born 2007)

Personal information
- Date of birth: 26 March 2007 (age 19)
- Place of birth: Sondalo, Italy
- Height: 1.79 m (5 ft 10 in)
- Position: Forward

Team information
- Current team: Inter Milan
- Number: 48

Youth career
- Grosio
- 2015–2025: Inter Milan

Senior career*
Years	Team	Apps	(Gls)
2025–	Inter Milan U23	6	(0)
2026–	Inter Milan	2	(0)

International career^{‡}
2022	Italy U15	4	(2)
2022–2023	Italy U16	15	(8)
2023–2024	Italy U17	19	(7)
2024–2026	Italy U19	14	(4)
2025–	Italy U20	5	(0)
Medal record
Men's football
Representing Italy
UEFA European Under-17 Championship
Winner	2024 Cyprus
- * Club domestic league appearances and goals as of 17 May 2026 ‡ National team caps and goals as of 10 April 2026

Mattia Mosconi (born 26 March 2007), is an Italian professional footballer who plays as a forward for Serie A club Inter Milan.

== Club career ==
=== Inter Milan ===
Born in Sondalo and living in Grosio, Mosconi is a youth product of Inter Milan, joining as an 8 years old from US Grosio.

In May 2023, he signed his first professional contract with Inter Milan.

After progressing through the Primavera ranks since the 2023–24 season, Mosconi made his unofficial first team during a pre-season friendly in August 2025 against Monza.

He then started playing for the reserve team in Serie C during the 2025–26 season.

Mosconi made his professional debut with Inter Milan U23 in a 1–2 Coppa Serie C win against Lumezzane on 16 August 2025.

In October 2025 he first featured on the team sheet with the first team during a Serie A game against Fiorentina. Mosconi made his professional Serie A debut with Inter Milan in a 3–0 win against Lazio on the 9th of May, 2026, substituting in the 79th minute for Petar Sučić.

== International career ==
Mosconi is a youth international for Italy since the under-15 team.

With the under-17, he captained his side to a win in the European Under-17 Championship, along the likes of Francesco Camarda and Mattia Liberali.

He then went on to be a regular with the under-19 and under-20 Italian teams, playing the 2025 FIFA U-20 World Cup with the latter.

== Honours ==
Italy U17

- UEFA European Under-17 Championship: 2024

Inter Milan

- Coppa Italia: 2025–26
- Serie A: 2025–26
