= Luka Koblar =

Slovenian footballer

Personal information
- Date of birth: 8 August 1999 (age 27)
- Place of birth: Slovenia
- Height: 1.92 m (6 ft 4 in)
- Position: Defender

Team information
- Current team: SV Lebring

Senior career*
Years	Team	Apps	(Gls)
2018–2021	Maribor	14	(0)
2019	→ Aluminij (loan)	11	(0)
2021–2022	Frosinone	0	(0)
2022	→ Potenza (loan)	6	(0)
2022–2024	Aluminij	55	(2)
2024–2025	Novara	1	(0)
2025	Legnago	5	(0)
2025	Stripfing	9	(1)
2026–	SV Lebring	10	(2)

International career^{‡}
2017	Slovenia U-19	1	(0)
2019	Slovenia U-21	2	(0)
- * Club domestic league appearances and goals as of 17 May 2026 ‡ National team caps and goals as of 10 June 2019

Luka Koblar (born 8 August 1999) is a Slovenian professional footballer who plays as a defender for Austrian club SV Lebring.

== Club career ==
Koblar started his career with NK Maribor, Slovenia's most successful club.

For the second half of 2019–20, he was sent on loan to NK Aluminij in the Slovenian top flight.

On 28 May 2021 he joined Frosinone.

In January 2022, he moved to Potenza on loan from Frosinone.

On 1 July 2022 he has been released by Frosinone.

On 2 August 2024, Koblar returned to Italy and signed with Novara for one season.
