= Gregorio Tanco =

Argentine association football player

Personal information
- Full name: Gregorio Josè Tanco
- Date of birth: 18 October 1999 (age 27)
- Place of birth: Pilar, Buenos Aires, Argentina
- Height: 1.81 m (5 ft 11 1/2 in)
- Position: Defender

Team information
- Current team: Crotone
- Number: 26

Youth career
- –2018: Ferro
- 2018–2021: Banfield

Senior career*
Years	Team	Apps	(Gls)
2021–2024	Banfield	24	(2)
2024	Spezia	5	(0)
2024–2025	Deportivo Maldonado	5	(0)
2025	Legnago	16	(0)
2025–2026	Lecco	22	(1)
2026–	Crotone	1	(0)
- * Club domestic league appearances and goals as of 24 August 2026

Gregorio Josè Tanco (born 18 October 1999) is an Argentine professional footballer who plays as a defender for Serie C Group C club Crotone.

== Career ==
From Pilar, Buenos Aires, a central defender who can also play at full back, he joined Banfield in 2018, having previously been at Ferro. He made his debut in the Argentine Primera Division against Lanus in March 2021. In December 2022, he suffered a broken arm in pre-season training which required surgery. With his contract with Banfield expiring in December 2023, and no agreement reached with the players agent Julio Cruz, it was reported that year that Tanco would be unable to continue to train with the Banfield first team.

In January 2024, Tanco moved to Serie B side Spezia. Later that year he joined Uruguayan side Deportivo Maldonado.
