= Paolo Dametto =

Italian footballer

Personal information
- Date of birth: 28 June 1993 (age 33)
- Place of birth: Arborea, Italy
- Height: 1.83 m (6 ft 0 in)
- Position: Defender

Team information
- Current team: Cosenza
- Number: 26

Youth career
- 2009–2012: Cagliari

Senior career*
Years	Team	Apps	(Gls)
2012–2013	Cagliari	0	(0)
2012	→ Prato (loan)	14	(0)
2012–2013	→ Lumezzane (loan)	30	(2)
2013–2015	Parma	0	(0)
2013–2014	→ Reggiana (loan)	28	(2)
2014–2015	→ Prato (loan)	36	(3)
2015–2018	Olbia	60	(3)
2018–2019	FeralpiSalò	8	(0)
2019–2020	Pistoiese	20	(0)
2020–2021	Picerno	21	(0)
2021–2025	Torres	121	(5)
2025–	Cosenza	36	(2)

International career
2009	Italy U16	4	(0)
2009	Italy U17	7	(0)
2011	Italy U18	6	(0)
- * Club domestic league appearances and goals as of 1 May 2026

Paolo Dametto (born 28 June 1993) is an Italian footballer who plays as a defender for Serie C Group C club Cosenza.

== Biography ==
Born in Arborea, Sardinia. Dametto started his career at the capital of the island region, for Cagliari. On 19 January 2012 Dametto was signed by Prato in a temporary deal. On 3 July 2012 he remained in Lega Pro, but for Lumezzane.

In summer 2013 he was signed by Parma F.C. on a free transfer in a 5-year contract. He was immediately farmed to another Emilian club Reggiana.

On 6 August 2014 Dametto was re-signed by Prato. On 20 June 2016 Parma formally bankrupted. He became a free agent.

In December 2015 Dametto returned to Sardinia for Olbia. The club promoted to Lega Pro in 2016 to fill the vacancies.

On 5 October 2018, he signed with FeralpiSalò.

On 17 July 2019, he signed with Pistoiese.

On 9 August 2021, he joined Torres in Serie D.
