= Mike Aidoo =

Italian footballer (born 2005)

Personal information
- Date of birth: 30 May 2005 (age 21)
- Place of birth: Italy
- Height: 1.75 m (5 ft 9 in)
- Position: Defender

Team information
- Current team: Inter Milan U23
- Number: 27

Youth career
- –2021: Chievo
- 2021–: Inter Milan

Senior career*
Years	Team	Apps	(Gls)
2024–	Inter Milan	0	(0)
2025–2026	→ Pergolettese (loan)	33	(1)
2026–	→ Inter Milan U23 (res.)	1	(0)

International career^{‡}
2021	Italy U17	2	(0)
2025–	Italy U20	3	(0)
- * Club domestic league appearances and goals as of 12 September 2026 ‡ National team caps and goals as of 27 March 2026

Mike Aidoo (born 30 May 2005) is an Italian professional footballer who plays as a defender for Serie C Group A club Inter Milan U23.

== Club career ==
=== Early career ===
Aidoo was born on 30 May 2005 in Italy to Ghanaian parents.

As a youth, Aidoo first joined the Chievo academy before moving to Inter Milan's youth setup at the age of sixteen.

=== Inter Milan ===
On 19 December 2024, Aidoo made his professional debut, coming on as an 88th-minute substitute for Matteo Darmian in a 2–0 win against Udinese in the round of 16 of the Coppa Italia.

==== Loan to Pergolettese ====
On 9 August 2025, Aidoo joined Serie C club Pergolettese on a season-long loan.

== International career ==
Born in Italy, Aidoo is of Ghanaian descent. He is an Italy youth international. He made two appearances while playing for the Italy national under-17 football team.

== Style of play ==
Aidoo operates primarily as a right-back, but he is also capable of playing as a midfielder. Right-footed and known for his speed, he is praised for his versatility on the field. His playing style has drawn comparisons to Netherlands international Denzel Dumfries.
