= 2025–26 Inter Milan Under-23 season =

Inter Milan Under-23
2025–26 season
- Chairman: Giuseppe Marotta
- Head coach: Stefano Vecchi
- Stadium: Stadio Brianteo
- Serie C: 12th
- Coppa Italia Serie C: Round of 16
- Top goalscorer: Antonino La Gumina (10)
- Biggest win: 2–0 v Pergolettese; 21 September 2025 (Serie C); 2–0 v Triestina; 26 September 2025 (Serie C); 3–1 v AlbinoLeffe; 3 November 2025 (Serie C); 2–0 v Lecco; 26 January 2026 (Serie C); 2–0 v Pro Vercelli; 4 April 2026 (Serie C)
- Biggest defeat: 1–4 v Triestina; 8 February 2026 (Serie C)
Home colours	Away colours	Third colours
- All statistics correct as of 25 April 2026.

The 2025–26 season is the inaugural season in the existence of Inter Milan Under-23, Inter Milan's reserve team, set to be played in Serie C, the third tier of Italian football. In addition to the domestic league, Inter U23 will participate in this season's edition of the Coppa Italia Serie C.

== Background ==
In February 2025, Inter Milan president Giuseppe Marotta announced the club's plans to launch a reserve team beginning with the 2025–26 season. The club, the fourth reserve team introduced in Italian football after Juventus Next Gen, Atalanta Under-23, and Milan Futuro, was formally admitted to Serie C on 24 July 2025, replacing the excluded SPAL. Stefano Vecchi was appointed as the inaugural head coach.

== Players ==
As of 28 January 2026

Note: Flags indicate national team as defined under FIFA eligibility rules. Players may hold more than one non-FIFA nationality.

No.	Player	Nat.	Position(s)	Date of birth (age)	Signed in	Signed from
Goalkeepers
1	Riccardo Melgrati^{¤}	(Italy)	GK	17 June 1994 (age 32)	2025	(Italy) SPAL
12	Paolo Raimondi	(Italy)	GK	14 May 2005 (age 21)	2025	Homegrown
91	Alessandro Calligaris	(Italy)	GK	7 March 2005 (age 21)	2025	Homegrown
Defenders
2	Tommaso Avitabile	(Italy)	RB	21 September 2006 (age 20)	2025	(Italy) Ciliverghe
3	Matteo Cocchi	(Italy)	LB	1 February 2007 (age 19)	2025	Homegrown
5	Christos Alexiou	(Greece)	CB	30 June 2005 (age 21)	2025	Homegrown
6	Yvan Maye	(France)	CB	21 March 2006 (age 20)	2025	Homegrown
15	Francesco Stante	(Italy)	CB	19 January 2005 (age 21)	2025	Homegrown
19	Giuseppe Prestia^{¤} (captain)	(Italy)	CB	13 November 1993 (age 33)	2025	(Italy) Cesena
24	Gabriele Re Cecconi	(Italy)	CB	25 April 2006 (age 20)	2025	Homegrown
25	Antonio David	(Romania)	LB	8 January 2004 (age 22)	2025	(Italy) Cesena (on loan)
26	Gabriele Garonetti	(Italy)	CB	10 March 2006 (age 20)	2025	Homegrown
46	Simone Cinquegrano	(Italy)	RB	25 June 2004 (age 22)	2025	(Italy) Sassuolo (on loan)
77	Igor Amerighi	(Italy)	RB	30 April 2005 (age 21)	2026	(Italy) Cavese
86	Leon Jakirović	(Croatia)	CB	16 January 2008 (age 18)	2026	(Croatia) Dinamo Zagreb
Midfielders
4	Mattia Zanchetta	(Italy)	DM	18 March 2006 (age 20)	2025	Homegrown
8	Luca Fiordilino^{¤}	(Italy)	DM	25 July 1996 (age 30)	2025	(Italy) Triestina
9	Luka Topalović	(Slovenia)	CM / AM	23 February 2006 (age 20)	2025	Homegrown
10	Issiaka Kamate	(France)	CM / RW	2 August 2004 (age 22)	2025	Homegrown
14	Leonardo Bovo	(Italy)	DM	7 May 2005 (age 21)	2025	Homegrown
16	Matteo Venturini	(Italy)	CM	15 August 2006 (age 20)	2025	Homegrown
23	Dilan Zárate	(Spain)	CM	1 August 2007 (age 19)	2025	Homegrown
37	Iwo Kaczmarski	(Poland)	DM / CM	16 April 2004 (age 22)	2025	(Italy) Empoli (on loan)
44	Thomas Berenbruch	(Italy)	CM / AM	31 May 2005 (age 21)	2025	Homegrown
Forwards
7	Matteo Spinaccè	(Italy)	ST	13 July 2006 (age 20)	2025	Homegrown
11	Richi Agbonifo	(Italy)	RW / SS	8 January 2006 (age 20)	2025	(Italy) Hellas Verona
20	Antonino La Gumina^{¤}	(Italy)	ST	6 March 1996 (age 30)	2025	(Italy) Sampdoria (on loan)
21	Aymen Zouin	(Morocco)	LW	29 December 2006 (age 19)	2025	Homegrown
30	Mattia Mosconi	(Italy)	LW / ST	26 March 2007 (age 19)	2025	Homegrown
35	Jan Żuberek	(Poland)	ST	13 March 2004 (age 22)	2025	Homegrown
34	Jamal Iddrissou	(Italy)	ST	22 September 2007 (age 19)	2025	Homegrown
90	Matteo Lavelli	(Italy)	ST	8 December 2006 (age 19)	2025	Homegrown

Notes

¤ – Players over the age of 23 allowed by the regulations.

=== Inter Primavera ===
Youth sector players that received an official call-up to the Under-23 team.

Note: Flags indicate national team as defined under FIFA eligibility rules. Players may hold more than one non-FIFA nationality.

No.	Player	Nat.	Position(s)	Date of birth (age)
33	Filippo Cerpelletti	(Italy)	DM	19 June 2007 (age 19)
36	Mattia Marello	(Italy)	LB	13 March 2008 (age 18)
38	Lamine Ballo	(Italy)	RB	10 May 2007 (age 19)
39	Leonardo Bovio	(Italy)	CB	4 February 2008 (age 18)
40	Henrikas Adomavičius	(Lithuania)	GK	2 January 2009 (age 17)
41	Carlo Galliera	(Italy)	GK	4 November 2009 (age 17)
43	Simon Lleshi	(Albania)	GK	27 April 2009 (age 17)
47	Cristian Carrara	(Italy)	ST	10 January 2008 (age 18)
50	Matteo Farronato	(Italy)	GK	18 January 2008 (age 18)
99	Tommaso Della Mora	(Italy)	RB	17 July 2006 (age 20)

== Transfers ==
=== In ===
Date	Pos.	Player	Moving from	Fee	Notes	Ref.
Summer
25 July 2025	GK	(Italy) Riccardo Melgrati	(Italy) SPAL	Free		
25 July 2025	DF	(Italy) Tommaso Avitabile	(Italy) Ciliverghe	Undisclosed		
25 July 2025	DF	(Italy) Giuseppe Prestia	(Italy) Cesena	Free		
30 July 2025	DF	(Italy) Simone Cinquegrano	(Italy) Sassuolo	N/A	On loan with option to buy	
1 August 2025	FW	(Italy) Richi Agbonifo	(Italy) Hellas Verona	€1.3M + €0.7M		
8 August 2025	MF	(Italy) Luca Fiordilino	(Italy) Triestina	Free		
13 August 2025	DF	(Romania) Antonio David	(Italy) Cesena	N/A	On loan with option to buy	
21 August 2025	FW	(Italy) Antonino La Gumina	(Italy) Sampdoria	N/A	On loan	
30 August 2025	MF	(Poland) Iwo Kaczmarski	(Italy) Empoli	N/A	On loan with obligation to buy	
Summer
26 January 2026	DF	(Croatia) Leon Jakirović	(Croatia) Dinamo Zagreb	€2.5M + €2.0M		
28 January 2026	DF	(Italy) Igor Amerighi	(Italy) Cavese	Undisclosed		

=== Out ===
Date	Pos.	Player	Moving to	Fee	Notes	Ref.
Summer
1 August 2025	MF	(Italy) Luca Di Maggio	(Italy) Padova	N/A	Loan with option to buy and counter-option	
5 August 2025	DF	(Italy) Giacomo Stabile	(Italy) Juve Stabia	N/A	On loan	
6 August 2025	MF	(Venezuela) Daniele Quieto	(Italy) Latina	N/A	On loan	
9 August 2025	DF	(Italy) Mike Aidoo	(Italy) Pergolettese	N/A	On loan	
14 August 2025	DF	(Italy) Matteo Motta	(Italy) Lumezzane	N/A	On loan	
20 August 2025	DF	(Italy) Alessandro Fontanarosa	(Italy) Avellino	Free w/ 50% sell-on		
20 August 2025	FW	(Senegal) Amadou Sarr	(Italy) AlbinoLeffe	Free w/ 50% sell-on		
1 September 2025	GK	(Italy) Matteo Zamarian	(Italy) Pro Patria	N/A	On loan	

== Pre-season and friendlies ==
27 July 2025 Friendly	Trento	2–2	Inter Milan U23	Trento
18:30 CEST (UTC+2)	Benedetti 30'; Mayr 69'	Report	Topalović 45'; Fontanarosa 90+3'	Stadium: Stadio Briamasco; Referee: Marco Schmid

3 August 2025 Friendly	Inter Milan	7–2	Inter Milan U23	Appiano Gentile
10:30 CEST (UTC+2)	Kamate 11' (o.g.); Bonny 15'; Asllani 32' (pen.); L. Martínez 41'; Esposito 50'; Luis Henrique 63'; Çalhanoğlu 90'	Report	Spinaccè 8'; Mosconi 30'	Stadium: BPER Training Centre; Referee: Andrea Calzavara

6 August 2025 Friendly	AlbinoLeffe	1–2	Inter Milan U23	Zanica
18:00 CEST (UTC+2)	Agostinelli 55'	Report	Potop 23' (o.g.); Żuberek 87' (pen.)	Stadium: AlbinoLeffe Stadium; Attendance: 660; Referee: Michele Pasculli

10 August 2025 Friendly	Pro Vercelli	1–4	Inter Milan U23	Vercelli
17:30 CEST (UTC+2)	Comi 47' (pen.)	Report	Cinquegrano 35'; Kamate 37' (pen.); Topalović 72'; Mosconi 88'	Stadium: Stadio Silvio Piola

2 May 2026 Friendly	Ravenna	1–1	Inter Milan U23	Ravenna
18:00 CEST (UTC+2)	Tenkorang 5'	Report	Żuberek 83'	Stadium: Stadio Bruno Benelli

7 May 2026 Friendly	Catania	4–1	Inter Milan U23	Calmasino
17:00 CEST (UTC+2)	Ierardi 12'; Cicerelli 22'; Forte 67'; Rolfini 75'	Report	Spinaccè 90+1'	Stadium: Veronello Resort

Trofeo dell’Armonia Sportiva

19 May 2026 Semi-finals	Atalanta U23	0–1	Inter Milan U23	Solomeo
18:15 CEST (UTC+2)			David 14'	Stadium: Centro Tecnico Federale Don Alberto Seri

20 May 2026 Final	Milan Futuro	0–1	Inter Milan U23	Solomeo
12:15 CEST (UTC+2)			Alexiou 19'	Stadium: Centro Tecnico Federale Don Alberto Seri

== Competitions ==
=== Overview ===
Competition	First match	Last match	Starting round	Final position	Record							
Competition	First match	Last match	Starting round	Final position	Pld	W	D	L	GF	GA	GD	Win %
Serie C	25 August 2025	26 April 2026	Matchday 1	12th	38	12	12	14	40	41	−1	31.58
Coppa Italia Serie C	16 August 2025	26 November 2025	First round	Round of 16	3	2	0	1	6	5	+1	66.67
Total					41	14	12	15	46	46	+0	34.15

Last updated: 25 April 2026
Source: Soccerway

=== Serie C ===
==== League table ====
Pos	Team	Pld	W	D	L	GF	GA	GD	Pts	Promotion, qualification or relegation
10	Giana Erminio	38	14	10	14	38	39	−1	52	Qualification for the group play-offs first round
11	AlbinoLeffe	38	13	11	14	51	49	+2	50	
12	Inter Milan U23	38	12	12	14	40	41	−1	48	
13	Novara	38	9	20	9	40	39	+1	47	
14	Pro Vercelli	38	13	7	18	39	55	−16	46	

Source: Lega Pro, Soccerway (in English)
Rules for classification: 1) Points; 2) Head-to-head points; 3) Head-to-head goal difference; 4) Goal difference; 5) Goals scored; 6) Lower goals against; 7) Wins; 8) Lower losses; 9) Away wins; 10) Lower home losses.
(Note: Head-to-head record is used only after all the matches between the teams in question have been played)

==== Results summary ====
Overall								Home						Away					
Pld	W	D	L	GF	GA	GD	Pts	W	D	L	GF	GA	GD	W	D	L	GF	GA	GD
38	12	12	14	40	41	−1	48	3	8	7	13	16	−3	9	4	7	27	25	+2

Source: Soccerway

==== Results by round ====
Round	1	2	4	3^{1}	5	6	7	8	10	9^{2}	11	12	13	15	16	14^{3}	17	18	19	20	21	22	23	24	25	26	27	28	29	30	31	32	33	35	34^{4}	36	37	38
Ground	A	H	H	A	A	H	A	H	A	H	H	A	H	A	H	A	A	H	A	H	A	H	A	H	A	H	A	A	H	A	H	A	H	A	H	H	A	H
Result	D	D	L	W	W	W	W	D	W	D	L	W	L	W	D	L	D	L	L	D	W	W	W	D	L	D	D	L	D	D	L	L	L	W	W	L	L	L
Position	11	12	15	9	6	4	4	4	4	4	4	4	5	5	6	6	5	5	5	7	7	5	4	4	7	8	8	8	8	8	8	9	12	11	9	9	12	12

Source: Soccerway
A = Away; H = Home; W = Win; D = Draw; L = Loss

^{1} Matchday 3 (vs Virtus Verona) originally scheduled for 6 September 2025 was postponed to 17 September 2025 due to international break.

^{2} Matchday 9 (vs Renate) originally scheduled for 12 October 2025 was postponed to 21 October 2025 due to international break.

^{3} Matchday 14 (vs Dolomiti Bellunesi) originally scheduled for 15 November 2025 was postponed to 3 December 2025 due to international break.

^{3} Matchday 34 (vs Trento) originally scheduled for 29 March 2026 was postponed to 8 April 2026 due to international break.

==== Matches ====
The league schedule was released on 28 July 2025.

25 August 2025 1	Novara	1–1	Inter Milan U23	Novara
20:30 CEST (UTC+2)	Citi (yellow card) 21'; Da Graca 64'	Report	Prestia (yellow card) 19'; Topalović 22'; Cinquegrano (yellow card) 44'; Kamate (yellow card) 61'; Bovo (yellow card) 75'	Stadium: Stadio Silvio Piola; Attendance: 2,147; Referee: Giorgio Bozzetto

31 August 2025 2	Inter Milan U23	2–2	Pro Patria	Monza
15:30 CEST (UTC+2)	La Gumina 16', 41'; Cinquegrano (yellow card) 34'	Report	Di Munno (yellow card) 30'; Renelus (yellow card) 40'; Giudici 49'; Mastroianni 65'	Stadium: Stadio Brianteo; Referee: Silvia Gasperotti

14 September 2025 4	Inter Milan U23	0–1	Lecco	Monza
15:00 CEST (UTC+2)	Stante (yellow card) 23'	Report	Metlika 64', (yellow card) 90'	Stadium: Stadio Brianteo; Referee: Domenico Castellone

17 September 2025 3	Virtus Verona	1–2	Inter Milan U23	Verona
19:00 CEST (UTC+2)	Munaretti 7'; Patanè (yellow card) 30'; Toffanin (yellow card) 39'; Bulevardi (yellow card) 82'	Report	Stante 22'; Maye (yellow card) 45+4'; Fiordilino 90+5'	Stadium: Stadio Gavagnin Nocini; Referee: Domenico Mirabella
Note: The match was originally scheduled for 6 September 2025.

21 September 2025 5	Pergolettese	0–2	Inter Milan U23	Crema
12:30 CEST (UTC+2)	Lambrughi (yellow card) 67'; Corti (red card) 90+7'	Report	Spinaccè (yellow card) 24', (goal) 45+2'; Fiordilino 35'; Cocchi (yellow card) 42' (yellow-red card) 60'; Cinquegrano (yellow card) 90+5'	Stadium: Stadio Giuseppe Voltini; Referee: Riccardo Dasso

25 September 2025 6	Inter Milan U23	2–0	Triestina	Monza
20:45 CEST (UTC+2)	Topalović 14'; Alexiou (yellow card) 53'; Kamate 81'	Report	Louati (yellow card) 28'	Stadium: Stadio Brianteo; Referee: Francesco Burlando

28 September 2025 7	Lumezzane	1–2	Inter Milan U23	Lumezzane
20:30 CEST (UTC+2)	Paghera (yellow card) 23' (yellow-red card) 33'; Malotti (yellow card) 50', (goal) 68' (pen.); Motta (yellow card) 60'	Report	Spinaccè 3', 74'; Cocchi (yellow card) 43'; Cinquegrano (yellow card) 81'	Stadium: Stadio Tullio Saleri; Referee: Cristiano Ursini

5 October 2025 8	Inter Milan U23	2–2	Ospitaletto	Monza
20:30 CEST (UTC+2)	La Gumina 27' (pen.); Prestia (yellow card) 58'; Spinaccè (yellow card) 69'; Topalović (yellow card) 85'; Żuberek 90+6'	Report	Panatti 45' (pen.); Pavanello 45+2'; Gualandris (yellow card) 58'; Guarnieri (red card) 75'	Stadium: Stadio Brianteo; Referee: Lucio Felice Angelillo

17 October 2025 10	Alcione	1–2	Inter Milan U23	Sesto San Giovanni
20:30 CEST (UTC+2)	Marconi 82'; Invernizzi (yellow card) 90+1'	Report	La Gumina 41', 45+3' (pen.); Kaczmarski (yellow card) 67'; Calligaris (yellow card) 76'	Stadium: Stadio Ernesto Breda; Referee: Luca De Angeli

21 October 2025 9	Inter Milan U23	1–1	Renate	Monza
16:30 CEST (UTC+2)	Kamate 5'; Cinquegrano (yellow card) 60'	Report	Calì 44'; Riviera (yellow card) 66'	Stadium: Stadio Brianteo; Referee: Andrea Terribile
Note: The match was originally scheduled for 12 October 2025.

27 October 2025 11	Inter Milan U23	0–1	Cittadella	Monza
20:30 CET (UTC+1)	Fiordilino (yellow card) 16'	Report	Gatti (yellow card) 30'; Salvi 72'; Redolfi (yellow card) 84'	Stadium: Stadio Brianteo; Referee: Giacomo Rossini

3 November 2025 12	AlbinoLeffe	1–3	Inter Milan U23	Zanica
20:30 CET (UTC+1)	De Paoli 53' (pen.), (yellow card) 67'; Sottini (yellow card) 79'	Report	Cocchi 30'; Prestia (yellow card) 61'; Topalović 84', 90+2'	Stadium: AlbinoLeffe Stadium; Referee: Giovanni Castellano

9 November 2025 13	Inter Milan U23	1–2	Vicenza	Monza
12:30 CET (UTC+1)	Spinaccè (yellow card) 37'; Kamate 50' (pen.), (yellow card) 90+7'; Lavelli (yellow card) 64'	Report	Caferri (yellow card) 13'; Capello 31'; Leverbe (red card) 49'; Costa (yellow card) 59'; Sandon (yellow card) 64'; Stückler 88'; Cavion (yellow card) 90+5'; Cuomo (yellow card) 90+7'	Stadium: Stadio Brianteo; Referee: Gianluca Renzi

23 November 2025 15	Trento	0–1	Inter Milan U23	Trento
12:30 CET (UTC+1)	Sangalli (yellow card) 71'	Report	Cinquegrano (yellow card) 47'; Stante (yellow card) 49'; Spinaccè 78'	Stadium: Stadio Briamasco; Referee: Fabrizio Ramondino

30 November 2025 16	Inter Milan U23	1–1	Pro Vercelli	Monza
14:30 CET (UTC+1)	Bovo (yellow card) 17'; Alexiou (yellow card) 25'; Kamate (yellow card) 53'; El Bouchataoui 64' (o.g.)	Report	Rutigliano 5'; Clemente (yellow card) 27'; Passador (yellow card) 86'	Stadium: Stadio Brianteo; Referee: Giuseppe Maria Manzo

3 December 2025 14	Dolomiti Bellunesi	1–0	Inter Milan U23	Fontanafredda
18:30 CET (UTC+1)	Agosti 15'; Mignanelli (yellow card) 31'; Burrai (yellow card) 60'; Consiglio (yellow card) 69'; Olonisakin (yellow card) 84'; Tavanti (yellow card) 90'; Gobetti (yellow card) 90+6'	Report	Fiordilino (yellow card) 4'; Stante (yellow card) 52'	Stadium: Stadio Omero Tognon; Referee: Filippo Colaninno
Note: The match was originally scheduled for 15 November 2025.

7 December 2025 17	Arzignano	1–1	Inter Milan U23	Arzignano
12:30 CET (UTC+1)	Chiarello (yellow card) 24'; Mattioli (penalty missed) 45+6', 47'; Castegnaro (yellow card) 52' (yellow-red card) 56'		Spinaccè 30'; Kamate (yellow card) 89'; Zouin (yellow card) 90'	Stadium: Stadio Tommaso Dal Molin; Referee: Domenico Mirabella

14 December 2025 18	Inter Milan U23	0–1	Giana Erminio	Monza
12:30 CET (UTC+1)	Melgrati (red card) 29'; Stante (yellow card) 66'	Report	Lamesta 45+1'; Lischetti (yellow card) 65'; Mazza (yellow card) 90+1'	Stadium: Stadio Brianteo; Referee: Alberto Poli

22 December 2025 19	Union Brescia	2–0	Inter Milan U23	Brescia
20:30 CET (UTC+1)	Balestrero (yellow card) 21'; Silvestri 90+3'; Cazzadori 90+7'	Report	Alexiou (yellow card) 6'; Re Cecconi (yellow card) 21'; Bovo (yellow card) 68'	Stadium: Stadio Mario Rigamonti; Referee: Mattia Drigo

4 January 2026 20	Inter Milan U23	0–0	Novara	Monza
14:30 CET (UTC+1)	Fiordilino (yellow card) 51'	Report	Basso (yellow card) 40'; Ledonne (yellow card) 86'; Di Cosmo (yellow card) 90+5'	Stadium: Stadio Brianteo; Referee: Leonardo Leorsini

10 January 2026 21	Pro Patria	1–2	Inter Milan U23	Busto Arsizio
17:30 CET (UTC+1)	Schirò (yellow card) 56'; Mastroianni (yellow card) 57'; Desogus 90+2'	Report	La Gumina 4', 27' (pen.); Alexiou (yellow card) 21'; Kamate (yellow card) 56'	Stadium: Stadio Carlo Speroni; Referee: Giacomo Rossini

18 January 2026 22	Inter Milan U23	1–0	Virtus Verona	Monza
17:30 CET (UTC+1)	Bovo (yellow card) 11'; La Gumina 45+10' (pen.); Alexiou (yellow card) 61'; Topalović (yellow card) 90+3'	Report	Daffara (yellow card) 45+2'; Bassi (yellow card) 45+9'; Zarpellon (yellow card) 52'; Toffanin (yellow card) 89'; Fabbro (yellow card) 90+3'	Stadium: Stadio Brianteo; Referee: Davide Cerea

26 January 2026 23	Lecco	0–2	Inter Milan U23	Lecco
20:30 CET (UTC+1)	Zanellato (yellow card) 61'; Marrone (yellow card) 71'; Lovisa (yellow card) 86'	Report	Kamate 52'; La Gumina 73'	Stadium: Stadio Rigamonti-Ceppi; Referee: Gioele Iacobellis

31 January 2026 24	Inter Milan U23	1–1	Pergolettese	Monza
17:30 CET (UTC+1)	Cinquegrano 52'; David (yellow card) 72'; Agbonifo (yellow card) 77'; Fiordilino (yellow card) 90+4'	Report	Careccia (yellow card) 25'; Corti 35'	Stadium: Stadio Brianteo; Referee: Alessandro Colelli

8 February 2026 25	Triestina	4–1	Inter Milan U23	Trieste
14:30 CET (UTC+1)	Tonetto 25'; D'Urso 45+4' (pen.), 69'; Silvestri (yellow card) 57'; Anzolin (yellow card) 90'; Faggioli 90+5' (pen.)	Report	Alexiou 17'; Zanchetta (yellow card) 54'; David (yellow card) 62'; Cinquegrano (yellow card) 80'; La Gumina (yellow card) 84'	Stadium: Stadio Nereo Rocco; Referee: Nicolò Dorillo

11 February 2026 26	Inter Milan U23	0–0	Lumezzane	Monza
20:30 CET (UTC+1)	Lavelli (yellow card) 45+3'; Agbonifo (yellow card) 90+5'	Report	Deratti (yellow card) 14' (yellow-red card) 51'; Stivanello (yellow card) 45+5'; Rocca (yellow card) 76'	Stadium: Stadio Brianteo; Referee: Leonardo Leorsini

16 February 2026 27	Ospitaletto	2–2	Inter Milan U23	Ospitaletto
20:30 CET (UTC+1)	Messaggi 29'; Torri 84'	Report	La Gumina 13'; Kamate 54'; Kaczmarski (yellow card) 57'; Prestia (yellow card) 63'	Stadium: Stadio Gino Corioni; Referee: Stefano Striamo

21 February 2026 28	Renate	2–1	Inter Milan U23	Meda
17:30 CET (UTC+1)	Bonetti 14'; Calì (yellow card) 48'; Auriletto (yellow card) 71'; Ekuban 76', (yellow card) 77'; Esposito (yellow card) 90+5'	Report	Iddrissou (yellow card) 47'; Berenbruch 55'	Stadium: Stadio Mino Favini; Referee: Davide Galiffi

28 February 2026 29	Inter Milan U23	0–0	Alcione	Monza
20:30 CET (UTC+1)		Report	Scuderi (yellow card) 46'; Morselli (yellow card) 62'; Chierichetti (yellow card) 78'; Ciappellano (red card) 90+5'	Stadium: Stadio Brianteo; Referee: Mattia Maresca

3 March 2026 30	Cittadella	1–1	Inter Milan U23	Cittadella
20:45 CET (UTC+1)	Casolari (yellow card) 7'; Ghezzi (yellow card) 27'; Perretta (yellow card) 66'; Rabbi 82'	Report	Amerighi 10', (yellow card) 21'; Berenbruch (yellow card) 78'	Stadium: Stadio Pier Cesare Tombolato; Referee: Filippo Colaninno

7 March 2026 31	Inter Milan U23	0–1	AlbinoLeffe	Monza
14:30 CET (UTC+1)	Cocchi (yellow card) 22'; Stante (yellow card) 62'	Report	Parlati 71'; Agostinelli (yellow card) 84'; Sciacca (red card) 89'	Stadium: Stadio Brianteo; Referee: Vittorio Emanuele Teghille

16 March 2026 32	Vicenza	2–1	Inter Milan U23	Vicenza
20:30 CET (UTC+1)	Capello 32'; Stückler 56'	Report	Fiordilino (yellow card) 23'; Amerighi (yellow card) 45+1'; Kamate 67'	Stadium: Stadio Romeo Menti; Referee: Rosario Luogno

22 March 2026 33	Inter Milan U23	1–2	Dolomiti Bellunesi	Monza
17:30 CET (UTC+1)	Kamate (yellow card) 12'; Cinquegrano 90+3'	Report	Clemenza 18'; Mondonico (yellow card) 59', (goal) 70'; Cossalter (yellow card) 90+1'	Stadium: Stadio Brianteo; Referee: Bruno Spina

4 April 2026 35	Pro Vercelli	0–2	Inter Milan U23	Vercelli
14:30 CEST (UTC+2)	El Bouchataoui (yellow card) 11'; Pino (yellow card) 90+1'	Report	Amerighi 15'; Alexiou 43'; Cinquegrano (yellow card) 73'	Stadium: Stadio Silvio Piola; Referee: Francesco D'Eusanio

8 April 2026 34	Inter Milan U23	2–1	Trento	Monza
15:00 CET (UTC+1)	Stante (yellow card) 15'; Spinaccè 16'; Amerighi (yellow card) 58'; Żuberek 72' (pen.)	Report	Aucelli (yellow card) 38'; Fossati (yellow card) 48'; Pellegrini 76'	Stadium: Stadio Brianteo; Referee: Giorgio Di Cicco
Note: The match was originally scheduled for 29 March 2026.

12 April 2026 36	Inter Milan U23	0–1	Arzignano	Monza
20:30 CEST (UTC+2)	David (yellow card) 65'	Report	Mattioli (yellow card) 40'; Boccia (yellow card) 44'; Bernardi (yellow card) 57'; Cariolato 63', (yellow card) 90'	Stadium: Stadio Brianteo; Referee: David Kovacevic

19 April 2026 37	Giana Erminio	2–0	Inter Milan U23	Gorgonzola
14:30 CEST (UTC+2)	Samele (yellow card) 18', (goal) 33'; Pinto (yellow card) 45'; Ferri (yellow card) 82'; Marotta (yellow card) 90'; Galeandro 90+4' (pen.)	Report	Alexiou (yellow card) 27'; Lavelli (yellow card) 90+3'	Stadium: Stadio Città di Gorgonzola; Referee: Gianluca Guitaldi

25 April 2026 38	Inter Milan U23	0–1	Union Brescia	Monza
20:30 CEST (UTC+2)	Berenbruch (yellow card) 70'	Report	Marras (yellow card) 6'; Crespi 77'; Balestrero (yellow card) 90+6'	Stadium: Stadio Brianteo; Referee: Stefano Striamo

=== Coppa Italia Serie C ===
16 August 2025 First round	Lumezzane	1–2	Inter Milan U23	Lumezzane
21:00 CEST (UTC+2)	Rolando (yellow card) 5'; Malotti 41'; Scanzi (yellow card) 52'; De Marino (yellow card) 90+2'		Fontanarosa (yellow card) 22'; Żuberek 44'; Fiordilino (yellow card) 50'; Kamate 65'; Re Cecconi (yellow card) 83'; Agbonifo (yellow card) 90+2'	Stadium: Stadio Tullio Saleri; Referee: Maksym Frasynyak

30 October 2025 Second round	Ospitaletto	1–2	Inter Milan U23	Ospitaletto
20:30 CET (UTC+1)	Pollio 81'	Report	David 58'; Berenbruch (yellow card) 79'; Alexiou 89'	Stadium: Stadio Gino Corioni; Referee: Andrea Palmieri

26 November 2025 Round of 16	Inter Milan U23	2–3	Renate	Monza
15:00 CET (UTC+1)	Lavelli 36'; David (yellow card) 65'; Żuberek 79', (yellow card) 90+5'	Report	Anelli 6'; Rossi 90' (pen.); Auriletto 90+3'; Mastromonaco (yellow card) 90+5'; Ziu (yellow card) 90+7'	Stadium: Stadio Brianteo; Referee: David Kovacevic

== Statistics ==
=== Appearances and goals ===
No.	Pos	Nat	Player	Total		Serie C		Coppa Italia Serie C	
No.	Pos	Nat	Player	Apps	Goals	Apps	Goals	Apps	Goals
Goalkeepers
1	GK	(Italy) ITA	Riccardo Melgrati	19	0	16	0	3	0
12	GK	(Italy) ITA	Paolo Raimondi	2	0	1+1	0	0	0
91	GK	(Italy) ITA	Alessandro Calligaris	21	0	21	0	0	0
Defenders
2	DF	(Italy) ITA	Tommaso Avitabile	5	0	1+3	0	0+1	0
3	DF	(Italy) ITA	Matteo Cocchi	27	1	22+4	1	1	0
5	DF	(Greece) GRE	Christos Alexiou	33	3	31+1	2	1	1
6	DF	(France) FRA	Yvan Maye	10	0	6+3	0	1	0
15	DF	(Italy) ITA	Francesco Stante	32	1	26+4	1	2	0
19	DF	(Italy) ITA	Giuseppe Prestia	31	0	30	0	1	0
24	DF	(Italy) ITA	Gabriele Re Cecconi	13	0	7+4	0	1+1	0
25	DF	(Romania) ROU	Antonio David	25	1	14+8	0	2+1	1
26	DF	(Italy) ITA	Gabriele Garonetti	0	0	0	0	0	0
46	DF	(Italy) ITA	Simone Cinquegrano	37	2	31+3	2	3	0
77	DF	(Italy) ITA	Igor Amerighi	9	2	7+2	2	0	0
86	DF	(Croatia) CRO	Leon Jakirović	0	0	0	0	0	0
Midfielders
4	MF	(Italy) ITA	Mattia Zanchetta	13	0	2+10	0	1	0
8	MF	(Italy) ITA	Luca Fiordilino	36	2	33+1	2	2	0
9	MF	(Slovenia) SLO	Luka Topalović	37	4	23+11	4	3	0
10	MF	(France) FRA	Issiaka Kamate	36	7	30+3	6	2+1	1
14	MF	(Italy) ITA	Leonardo Bovo	27	0	13+12	0	0+2	0
16	MF	(Italy) ITA	Matteo Venturini	7	0	0+6	0	0+1	0
23	MF	(Spain) ESP	Dilan Zárate	1	0	0	0	0+1	0
37	MF	(Poland) POL	Iwo Kaczmarski	35	0	24+10	0	1	0
44	MF	(Italy) ITA	Thomas Berenbruch	29	1	12+15	1	1+1	0
Forwards
7	FW	(Italy) ITA	Matteo Spinaccè	28	6	17+9	6	2	0
11	FW	(Italy) ITA	Richi Agbonifo	27	0	5+19	0	1+2	0
20	FW	(Italy) ITA	Antonino La Gumina	27	10	24+3	10	0	0
21	FW	(Morocco) MAR	Aymen Zouin	10	0	0+10	0	0	0
30	FW	(Italy) ITA	Mattia Mosconi	7	0	1+4	0	1+1	0
34	FW	(Italy) ITA	Jamal Iddrissou	14	0	3+10	0	1	0
35	FW	(Poland) POL	Jan Żuberek	18	4	4+12	2	1+1	2
90	FW	(Italy) ITA	Matteo Lavelli	32	1	15+15	0	1+1	1
Players transferred out during the season
63	DF	(Italy) ITA	Alessandro Fontanarosa	1	0	0	0	1	0

Source: Competitions

=== Goalscorers ===
Rank	No.	Pos.	Player	Serie C	Coppa Italia Serie C	Total
1	20	FW	(Italy) Antonino La Gumina	10	0	10
2	10	MF	(France) Issiaka Kamate	6	1	7
3	7	FW	(Italy) Matteo Spinaccè	6	0	6
4	9	MF	(Slovenia) Luka Topalović	4	0	4
4	35	FW	(Poland) Jan Żuberek	2	2	4
6	5	DF	(Greece) Christos Alexiou	2	1	3
7	8	MF	(Italy) Luca Fiordilino	2	0	2
7	46	DF	(Italy) Simone Cinquegrano	2	0	2
7	77	DF	(Italy) Igor Amerighi	2	0	2
10	3	DF	(Italy) Matteo Cocchi	1	0	1
10	15	DF	(Italy) Francesco Stante	1	0	1
10	25	DF	(Romania) Antonio David	0	1	1
10	44	MF	(Italy) Thomas Berenbruch	1	0	1
10	90	FW	(Italy) Matteo Lavelli	0	1	1
Own goals				1	0	1
Totals				40	6	46

=== Clean sheets ===
Rank	No.	Player	Serie C	Coppa Italia Serie C	Total
1	91	(Italy) Alessandro Calligaris	7	0	7
2	1	(Italy) Riccardo Melgrati	2	0	2
Totals			9	0	9

=== Disciplinary record ===
No.	Pos.	Player	Serie C			Coppa Italia Serie C			Total		
No.	Pos.	Player	Yellow card	(yellow card) (yellow-red card)	Red card	Yellow card	(yellow card) (yellow-red card)	Red card	Yellow card	(yellow card) (yellow-red card)	Red card
1	GK	(Italy) Riccardo Melgrati	0	0	1	0	0	0	0	0	1
3	DF	(Italy) Matteo Cocchi	2	1	0	0	0	0	2	1	0
4	MF	(Italy) Mattia Zanchetta	1	0	0	0	0	0	1	0	0
5	DF	(Greece) Christos Alexiou	6	0	0	0	0	0	6	0	0
6	DF	(France) Yvan Maye	1	0	0	0	0	0	1	0	0
7	FW	(Italy) Matteo Spinaccè	3	0	0	0	0	0	3	0	0
8	MF	(Italy) Luca Fiordilino	5	0	0	1	0	0	6	0	0
9	MF	(Slovenia) Luka Topalović	2	0	0	0	0	0	2	0	0
10	MF	(France) Issiaka Kamate	6	0	0	0	0	0	6	0	0
11	FW	(Italy) Richi Agbonifo	2	0	0	1	0	0	3	0	0
14	MF	(Italy) Leonardo Bovo	4	0	0	0	0	0	4	0	0
15	DF	(Italy) Francesco Stante	6	0	0	0	0	0	6	0	0
19	DF	(Italy) Giuseppe Prestia	4	0	0	0	0	0	4	0	0
20	FW	(Italy) Antonino La Gumina	1	0	0	0	0	0	1	0	0
21	FW	(Morocco) Aymen Zouin	1	0	0	0	0	0	1	0	0
24	DF	(Italy) Gabriele Re Cecconi	1	0	0	1	0	0	2	0	0
25	DF	(Romania) Antonio David	3	0	0	1	0	0	4	0	0
34	FW	(Italy) Jamal Iddrissou	1	0	0	0	0	0	1	0	0
35	FW	(Poland) Jan Żuberek	0	0	0	1	0	0	1	0	0
37	MF	(Poland) Iwo Kaczmarski	2	0	0	0	0	0	2	0	0
44	MF	(Italy) Thomas Berenbruch	2	0	0	1	0	0	3	0	0
46	DF	(Italy) Simone Cinquegrano	8	0	0	0	0	0	8	0	0
63	DF	(Italy) Alessandro Fontanarosa	0	0	0	1	0	0	1	0	0
77	DF	(Italy) Igor Amerighi	3	0	0	0	0	0	3	0	0
90	FW	(Italy) Matteo Lavelli	3	0	0	0	0	0	3	0	0
91	GK	(Italy) Alessandro Calligaris	1	0	0	0	0	0	1	0	0
Totals			66	1	1	7	0	0	73	1	1
