= Issiaka Kamate =

French footballer (born 2004)

Personal information
- Date of birth: 2 August 2004 (age 22)
- Place of birth: Aulnay-sous-Bois, France
- Height: 1.86 m (6 ft 1 in)
- Positions: Central midfielder; winger

Team information
- Current team: Atlético Madrid B
- Number: 21

Youth career
- –2020: FC Montfermeil
- 2020–2024: Inter Milan

Senior career*
Years	Team	Apps	(Gls)
2024–2026	Inter Milan	0	(0)
2024–2025	→ AVS (loan)	8	(0)
2025	→ Modena (loan)	10	(0)
2025–2026	Inter Milan U23	33	(6)
2026–	Atlético Madrid B	0	(0)
- * Club domestic league appearances and goals as of 30 April 2026

Issiaka Kamate (born 2 August 2004) is a French professional footballer who plays as a central midfielder or winger for Spanish club Atlético Madrileño.

== Early life ==
Kamate is a native of Villepinte, France.

== Career ==
Kamate joined the youth academy of Italian side Inter at the age of sixteen. On 21 August 2024, he joined Primeira Liga club AVS on a season-long loan. After eight appearances for the Portuguese side, Kamate's loan was ended in January 2025.

On 31 January 2025, Kamate joined Serie B club Modena on loan until the end of the season. In the summer of 2025, he returned to Inter Milan, where he was assigned to their newly established reserve team.

On 4 February 2026, Kamate made his debut for the Inter Milan senior squad, with Inter manager Cristian Chivu putting him in the starting XI as a right wing-back in a Coppa Italia quarter final match vs Torino. He marked his debut with an 35th minute assist, providing a right-footed cross into fellow frenchman Ange-Yoan Bonny to make the game 1–0.

On 1 September 2026, Kamate signed a four-year contract with Spanish club Atlético Madrid, being initially assigned to the B-team in Primera Federación.

== Style of play ==
Kamate has operated as a midfielder and right-winger.

== Personal life ==
Born in France, Kamate is of Ivorian descent.

== Career statistics ==
As of match played 21 February 2026

Appearances and goals by club, season and competition
Club	Season	League			National cup (Note: Includes Taça de Portugal and Coppa Italia)		Europe		Other		Total	
Club	Season	Division	Apps	Goals	Apps	Goals	Apps	Goals	Apps	Goals	Apps	Goals
AVS (loan)	2024–25	Primeira Liga	8	0	1	0	—		—		9	0
Modena (loan)	2024–25	Serie B	10	0	—		—		—		10	0
Inter Milan U23	2025–26	Serie C	26	5	—		—		3 (Note: Appearances in Coppa Italia Serie C)	1	29	6
Inter Milan	2025–26	Serie A	0	0	1	0	—		—		1	0
Career total			44	5	2	0	0	0	3	1	49	6

== Honours ==
Inter Milan

- Coppa Italia: 2025–26
