= Antonino La Gumina =

Italian footballer (born 1996)

Personal information
- Date of birth: 6 March 1996 (age 30)
- Place of birth: Palermo, Italy
- Height: 1.82 m (6 ft 0 in)
- Position: Forward

Team information
- Current team: Salernitana
- Number: 20

Youth career
- –2006: Capaci
- 2006–2015: Palermo

Senior career*
Years	Team	Apps	(Gls)
2015–2018	Palermo	33	(9)
2016–2017	→ Ternana (loan)	15	(1)
2018–2021	Empoli	39	(6)
2020–2021	→ Sampdoria (loan)	14	(0)
2021–2026	Sampdoria	21	(2)
2021–2022	→ Como (loan)	34	(9)
2022–2023	→ Benevento (loan)	27	(3)
2024	→ Mirandés (loan)	16	(1)
2025	→ Cesena (loan)	11	(2)
2025–2026	→ Inter Milan U23 (loan)	27	(10)
2026–	Salernitana	0	(0)

International career
2016	Italy U20	3	(2)
2018	Italy U21	2	(0)
- * Club domestic league appearances and goals as of 30 April 2026

Antonino La Gumina (born 6 March 1996) is an Italian professional footballer who plays as a forward for Serie C Group C club Salernitana.

== Club career ==
=== Palermo ===
La Gumina is a youth product from Palermo. He made his Serie A debut on 4 April 2015 against A.C. Milan, replacing Mato Jajalo after 88 minutes of a 1–2 home defeat.

=== Empoli ===
On 6 July 2018, La Gumina signed until 30 June 2023 with Serie A club Empoli.

=== Sampdoria ===
On 31 January 2020, La Gumina signed a contract with Sampdoria until 30 June 2024. The transfer was initially a loan until June 2021, with Sampdoria holding an obligation to buy out his rights at the end of the loan term.

On 26 July 2022, he was loaned to Benevento.

On 1 February 2024, La Gumina moved on loan to Mirandés in Spain.

On 9 January 2025, La Gumina joined Cesena on loan with an option to buy.

On 21 August 2025, La Gumina was loaned to Inter Milan U23, Inter Milan's reserve team.

=== Salernitana ===
On 25 August 2026, La Gumina joined Serie C club Salernitana, signing a two-year contract.

== Career statistics ==
As of match played 25 April 2026

Appearances and goals by club, season and competition
Club	Season	League			National Cup		Continental		Other		Total	
Club	Season	Division	Apps	Goals	Apps	Goals	Apps	Goals	Apps	Goals	Apps	Goals
Palermo	2014–15	Serie A	1	0	—		—		—		1	0
Palermo	2015–16	Serie A	3	0	0	0	—		—		3	0
Palermo	2017–18	Serie B	29	9	2	1	—		4 (Note: Appearance(s) in Serie B promotion play-offs)	2	35	12
Palermo	Total		33	9	2	1	—		4	2	39	12
Ternana (loan)	2016–17	Serie B	15	1	2	1	—		—		17	2
Empoli	2018–19	Serie A	22	2	1	0	—		—		23	2
Empoli	2019–20	Serie B	17	4	2	0	—		—		19	4
Empoli	Total		39	6	3	0	—		—		42	6
Sampdoria (loan)	2019–20	Serie A	5	0	—		—		—		5	0
Sampdoria (loan)	2020–21	Serie A	9	0	2	1	—		—		11	1
Sampdoria	2023–24	Serie B	12	2	2	0	—		—		14	2
Sampdoria	2024–25	Serie B	9	0	1	0	—		—		10	0
Sampdoria	Total		35	2	5	1	—		—		40	3
Como (loan)	2021–22	Serie B	34	9	—		—		—		34	9
Benevento (loan)	2022–23	Serie B	27	3	1	0	—		—		28	3
Mirandés (loan)	2023–24	Segunda División	16	1	—		—		—		16	1
Cesena (loan)	2024–25	Serie B	11	2	—		—		1	0	12	2
Inter Milan U23 (loan)	2025–26	Serie C	27	10	—		—		0	0	27	10
Career total			237	43	13	3	0	0	5	2	255	48
