= Simone Cinquegrano =

Italian footballer (born 2004)

Personal information
- Date of birth: 25 June 2004 (age 22)
- Place of birth: Modena, Italy
- Height: 1.92 m (6 ft 4 in)
- Position: Right-back

Team information
- Current team: Sassuolo
- Number: 46

Youth career
- –2020: Fiorano
- 2020–2021: Castelvetro
- 2021–2024: Sassuolo

Senior career*
Years	Team	Apps	(Gls)
2024–	Sassuolo	5	(0)
2024–2025	→ Rimini (loan)	29	(2)
2025–2026	→ Inter Milan U23 (loan)	34	(2)
- * Club domestic league appearances and goals as of 18 September 2026

Simone Cinquegrano (born 25 June 2004) is an Italian footballer who plays as a right-back or wing-back for Serie A club Sassuolo.

== Club career ==
=== Sassuolo ===
Cinquegrano joined Sassuolo's youth academy at the age of 17. Initially deployed as a striker, he gradually established himself, thanks to his physical qualities, as an attack-minded full-back, capable of both creating assists and scoring goals. With the Neroverdi, Cinquegrano won two editions of the Torneo di Viareggio and played a key role in securing the 2023–24 Campionato Primavera 1 title, contributing five goals and one assist in 35 appearances.

==== Loan to Rimini ====
On 2 August 2024, Cinquegrano made his first professional move, joining Serie C club Rimini on a season-long loan. During his tenure with the club, he helped the team to secure their first historic Coppa Italia Serie C title.

==== Loan to Inter Milan U23 ====
On 30 July 2025, Cinquegrano signed with Inter Milan U23, Inter Milan's newly established reserve team, joining on a season-long loan with the option to make the transfer permanent.

== Personal life ==
Born in Italy, he holds dual citizenship due to his Argentine heritage.

== Career statistics ==
=== Club ===
As of match played 18 September 2026

Appearances and goals by club, season and competition
Club	Season	League			National cup (Note: Includes Coppa Italia)		League cup (Note: Includes Coppa Italia Serie C)		Other		Total	
Club	Season	Division	Apps	Goals	Apps	Goals	Apps	Goals	Apps	Goals	Apps	Goals
Rimini (loan)	2024–25	Serie C	29	2	–		7	1	2 (Note: Appearances in Serie C play-offs)	0	38	3
Inter Milan U23 (loan)	2025–26	Serie C	34	2	–		3	0	–		37	2
Sassuolo	2026–27	Serie A	5	0	2	0	–		–		7	0
Career total			67	4	2	0	10	1	2	0	81	5

== Honours ==
Sassuolo Youth Sector

- Torneo di Viareggio: 2021–22; 2022–23
- Campionato Primavera 1: 2023–24

Rimini

- Coppa Italia Serie C: 2024–25
