= Jan Żuberek =

Polish footballer (born 2004)

Personal information
- Date of birth: 13 March 2004 (age 22)
- Place of birth: Białystok, Poland
- Height: 1.88 m (6 ft 2 in)
- Position: Striker

Team information
- Current team: Inter Milan U23
- Number: 11

Youth career
- –2019: AP Talent Białystok
- 2020–2021: SPAL
- 2021–2024: Inter Milan

Senior career*
Years	Team	Apps	(Gls)
2024–	Inter Milan	0	(0)
2024	→ Ternana (loan)	1	(0)
2024–2025	→ Lecco (loan)	15	(0)
2025	→ Avellino (loan)	12	(0)
2025–	Inter Milan U23	25	(7)

International career
2017	Poland U14	1	(0)
2022	Poland U18	4	(1)
2022	Poland U19	3	(3)
2024	Poland U20	6	(2)
- * Club domestic league appearances and goals as of 19:44, 24 October 2026 (UTC)

Jan Żuberek (born 13 March 2004) is a Polish professional footballer who plays as a striker for Serie C Group C club Inter Milan U23.

== Club career ==
Żuberek joined the youth academy of Italian side SPAL at the age of fifteen. In August 2022, he moved to Inter Primavera. On 25 January 2023, he suffered an anterior cruciate ligament injury in the 5th minute of the 2022 Supercoppa Primavera final against Fiorentina.

On 11 January 2024, Żuberek joined Serie B club Ternana on loan for the remainder of the season.

On 9 August 2024, he was sent on a season-long loan to third-tier side Lecco.

On 3 February 2025, he moved on loan to fellow Serie C club Avellino until the end of the season.

In the summer of 2025, Żuberek returned to Inter Milan and was assigned to the club's newly established reserve team. On 16 August 2025, he became the team's first-ever official goalscorer, netting the equaliser in a 2–1 comeback victory over Lumezzane in the Coppa Italia Serie C.

== Style of play ==
Żuberek mainly operates as a striker and is known for his strength.

== Personal life ==
Żuberek is the son of Polish footballer Dzidosław Żuberek.

== Career statistics ==
As of match played 24 October 2026

Appearances and goals by club, season and competition
Club	Season	League			National cup		Europe		Other		Total	
Club	Season	Division	Apps	Goals	Apps	Goals	Apps	Goals	Apps	Goals	Apps	Goals
Ternana (loan)	2023–24	Serie B	1	0	—		—		0	0	1	0
Lecco (loan)	2024–25	Serie C Group A	15	0	—		—		1 (Note: Appearance(s) in Coppa Italia Serie C)	0	16	0
Avellino (loan)	2024–25	Serie C Group C	3	0	—		—		1 (Note: Appearance in Supercoppa di Serie C)	0	4	0
Inter Milan U23	2025–26	Serie C Group A	16	2	—		—		2	2	18	4
Inter Milan U23	2026–27	Serie C Group C	9	5	—		—		1	0	10	5
Inter Milan U23	Total		25	7	—		—		3	2	28	9
Career total			44	7	0	0	0	0	5	2	49	9

== Honours ==
Inter Primavera

- Campionato Primavera 1: 2021–22

Avellino

- Serie C Group C: 2024–25
