= Matteo Cocchi =

Italian footballer (born 2007)

Personal information
- Date of birth: 1 February 2007 (age 19)
- Place of birth: Imola, Italy
- Position: Full-back

Team information
- Current team: Padova (on loan from Inter Milan)
- Number: 34

Youth career
- –2021: Bologna
- 2021–2025: Inter Milan

Senior career*
Years	Team	Apps	(Gls)
2025–	Inter Milan	1	(0)
2025–2026	→ Inter Milan U23 (res.)	26	(1)
2026–	→ Padova (loan)	5	(0)

International career^{‡}
2022	Italy U15	6	(1)
2022–2023	Italy U17	23	(0)
2024	Italy U18	1	(0)
2024–	Italy U19	4	(0)
- * Club domestic league appearances and goals as of 23:56, 3 October 2026 (UTC) ‡ National team caps and goals as of 06:16, 12 March 2025 (UTC)

Matteo Cocchi (born 1 February 2007) is an Italian professional footballer who plays as a defender for Serie B club Padova, on loan from Inter Milan.

== Career ==
Cocchi was in the Bologna youth team before joining Inter Milan in 2021. In 2024, his contract with Inter was extended into 2027. He plays on the left as a full-back or attacking wingback, and after featuring for the Inter Under-19 and Primavera team during the 2024–25 season, was called upon by Inter manager Simone Inzaghi during an injury crisis in that position. He made his professional debut for Inter Milan on 11 March 2025, appearing as a second-half substitute in the UEFA Champions League at home against Feyenoord, in a 2–1 win.

During the 2025–26 season, Cocchi established himself as a regular starter for Inter Milan's newly formed reserve side in Serie C, making 26 league appearances and scoring once.

On 22 July 2026, Cocchi moved to Serie B side Padova on a season-long loan.

== Career statistics ==
=== Club ===
As of match played 23 May 2026

Appearances and goals by club, season and competition
Club	Season	League			Coppa Italia		Europe		Other		Total	
Club	Season	Division	Apps	Goals	Apps	Goals	Apps	Goals	Apps	Goals	Apps	Goals
Inter Milan	2024–25	Serie A	0	0	0	0	1 (Note: Appearance in UEFA Champions League)	0	0	0	1	0
Inter Milan	2025–26	Serie A	1	0	2	0	0	0	0	0	3	0
Inter Milan	Total		1	0	2	0	1	0	0	0	4	0
Inter Milan U23	2025–26	Serie C	26	1	-		—		1 (Note: Appearance in Coppa Italia Serie C)	0	27	1
Career total			27	1	2	0	1	0	1	0	31	1

== Honours ==
Inter Milan

- Coppa Italia: 2025–26
- Serie A: 2025–26
