= Jamal Iddrissou =

Italian footballer (born 2007)

Personal information
- Date of birth: 22 September 2007 (age 19)
- Place of birth: Brescia, Italy
- Height: 1.88 m (6 ft 2 in)
- Positions: Winger; forward

Team information
- Current team: Inter Milan U23
- Number: 9

Youth career
- Inter Milan

Senior career*
Years	Team	Apps	(Gls)
2025–	Inter Milan U23	13	(0)

International career^{‡}
2025	Italy U18	3	(1)
2025–	Italy U19	12	(4)
2025–	Italy U20	5	(2)
- * Club domestic league appearances and goals ‡ National team caps and goals as of 8 July 2026

Jamal Iddrissou (born 22 December 2007) is an Italian professional footballer who plays as a winger or forward for Serie C group C club Inter Milan U23.

== Early life ==
Iddrissou was born on 22 December 2007 and is of Ghanaian descent through his parents. The younger brother of Italian footballer Subutan Iddrissou, he has two older sisters.

Iddrissou was born in Brescia, Italy, and grew up in Concesio. He started playing football at the age of six and regarded Mauro Icardi and Marcus Thuram as his football idols.

== Club career ==
Iddrissou joined the youth academy of Serie A side Inter Milan at the age of ten, where he was regarded as one of the club's most important prospects. Ahead of the 2023–24 season, he was promoted to their under-18 team, where he made 33 league appearances and scored 19 goals as captain under Italian manager Benito Carbone.

Two years later, Iddrissou was promoted to the club's under-20 team, where wore the number 9 jersey and played in the UEFA Youth League. He helped them win the 2025 Supercoppa Primavera. The same year, he was promoted to their reserve team, where he made 13 league appearances during his first season with them.

== International career ==
Iddrissou is an Italy youth international. During September and October 2025, he played for the Italy national under-20 football team at the 2025 FIFA U-20 World Cup. The next year, he played for the Italy national under-19 football team at the 2026 UEFA European Under-19 Championship.

== Style of play ==
Iddrissou plays as a winger or forward. English website Goal wrote in 2026 that he "is a striker, capable of operating both as a central striker and as a right winger within a three-man attacking trio. Standing 188 cm tall, he has an excellent eye for goal, which he combines with physicality and technique".

Initially, he played as a defender upon joining the youth academy of Serie A side Inter Milan and was known for his dribbling ability before developing his goalscoring ability and switching to forward.

== Personal life ==
Iddrissou enjoys making music. Among his favorite musical artists are rappers Vale Pain and Lil Cr.
