= Eljon Toçi =

Albanian footballer (born 2003)

Personal information
- Full name: Eljon Toçi
- Date of birth: 9 January 2003 (age 23)
- Place of birth: Dibër, Albania
- Height: 1.83 m (6 ft 0 in)
- Position: Centre-forward

Team information
- Current team: Dolomiti Bellunesi
- Number: 9

Youth career
- Olimpia Merano
- –2020: Südtirol
- 2020–2023: Fiorentina

Senior career*
Years	Team	Apps	(Gls)
2019–2020	Südtirol	4	(0)
2021–2025	Fiorentina	0	(0)
2023–2024	→ Sestri Levante (loan)	11	(0)
2024	→ Pro Sesto (loan)	15	(4)
2024–2025	→ Pro Patria (loan)	35	(1)
2025–	Dolomiti Bellunesi	18	(3)

International career^{‡}
2021	Albania U19	7	(3)
2022	Albania U20	1	(0)
2021–2023	Albania U21	9	(0)
- * Club domestic league appearances and goals as of 30 April 2026 ‡ National team caps and goals as of 17 October 2023

Eljon Toçi (born 9 January 2003) is an Albanian professional footballer who plays as a centre-forward for Serie C Group A club Dolomiti Bellunesi.

== Club career ==
=== Early career ===
Toçi started his career with local club Olimpia Merano in South Tyrol as a young child, before joining Südtirol, also in the same region. He would progress through the ranks at the club and was promoted to the first team in January 2020, where he made his senior professional debut in a Serie C match on 19 January 2020, coming on as an 85th-minute substitute in the 4–1 win over Rimini.

=== Fiorentina ===
On 4 August 2023, Toçi was loaned by Fiorentina to Serie C club Sestri Levante. On 12 January 2024, he moved on a new loan to Pro Sesto, also in Serie C.
