= Iwo Kaczmarski =

Polish footballer

Personal information
- Date of birth: 16 April 2004 (age 22)
- Place of birth: Kielce, Poland
- Height: 1.83 m (6 ft 0 in)
- Position: Midfielder

Team information
- Current team: Inter Milan U23
- Number: 7

Youth career
- –2019: Korona Kielce

Senior career*
Years	Team	Apps	(Gls)
2019–2020	Korona Kielce II	3	(0)
2020	Korona Kielce	19	(1)
2021–2022	Raków Częstochowa	3	(0)
2022	→ Empoli (loan)	0	(0)
2022–2026	Empoli	1	(0)
2024–2025	→ Miedź Legnica (loan)	44	(5)
2025–2026	→ Inter Milan U23 (loan)	34	(0)
2026–	Inter Milan U23	0	(0)

International career^{‡}
2017	Poland U14	1	(0)
2018–2019	Poland U15	6	(1)
2019	Poland U16	4	(0)
2020	Poland U17	3	(0)
2022	Poland U18	3	(0)
2021–2023	Poland U19	6	(0)
2023–2024	Poland U20	3	(0)
- * Club domestic league appearances and goals as of 30 April 2026 ‡ National team caps and goals as of 9 September 2024

Iwo Kaczmarski (born 16 April 2004) is a Polish professional footballer who plays as a midfielder for Serie C Group A club Inter Milan U23.

== Club career ==
A native of Kielce, Kaczmarski started his career with his hometown club Korona Kielce. On 18 July 2020, the last matchday of the 2019–20 season, he scored his first professional goal in a 2–0 win against ŁKS Łódź, becoming the second youngest Ekstraklasa goalscorer at the age of 16 years and 93 days.

On 30 January 2022, Kaczmarski joined Serie A club Empoli on loan until the end of the season, with a conditional obligation to buy. He played for Empoli's Under-19 squad.

On 7 February 2024, he moved to Miedź Legnica on an eighteen-month loan with an option to buy. He returned to Empoli after the 2024–25 season concluded.

On 30 August 2025, Kaczmarski joined Inter Milan Under-23 on a season-long loan with an obligation to buy.

== International career ==
In June 2023, Kaczmarski was included in the Polish under-19 squad that took part in the 2023 UEFA European Under-19 Championship in Malta.

== Career statistics ==
As of match played 14 August 2026

Appearances and goals by club, season and competition
Club	Season	League			National cup		Europe		Other		Total	
Club	Season	Division	Apps	Goals	Apps	Goals	Apps	Goals	Apps	Goals	Apps	Goals
Korona Kielce II	2019–20	III liga, gr. IV	3	0	—		—		—		3	0
Korona Kielce	2019–20	Ekstraklasa	4	1	0	0	—		—		4	1
Korona Kielce	2020–21	I liga	15	0	2	0	—		—		17	0
Korona Kielce	Total		19	1	2	0	—		—		21	1
Raków Częstochowa	2020–21	Ekstraklasa	2	0	0	0	—		—		2	0
Raków Częstochowa	2021–22	Ekstraklasa	1	0	1	0	0	0	0	0	2	0
Raków Częstochowa	Total		3	0	1	0	0	0	0	0	4	0
Miedź Legnica (loan)	2023–24	I liga	13	1	—		—		—		13	1
Miedź Legnica (loan)	2024–25	I liga	31	4	2	0	—		0	0	33	4
Miedź Legnica (loan)	Total		44	5	2	0	—		—		46	5
Empoli	2025–26	Serie B	1	0	—		—		—		1	0
Inter Milan U23 (loan)	2025–26	Serie C	34	0	—		—		1 (Note: Appearance in Coppa Italia Serie C)	0	35	0
Inter Milan U23	2026–27	Serie C	0	0	—		—		1	0	1	0
Inter Milan U23	Inter U23 total		34	0	—		—		2	0	36	0
Career total			104	6	5	0	0	0	2	0	111	6

== Honours ==
Raków Częstochowa

- Polish Cup: 2021–22
