= Davide Mazzocco =

Italian footballer (born 1995)

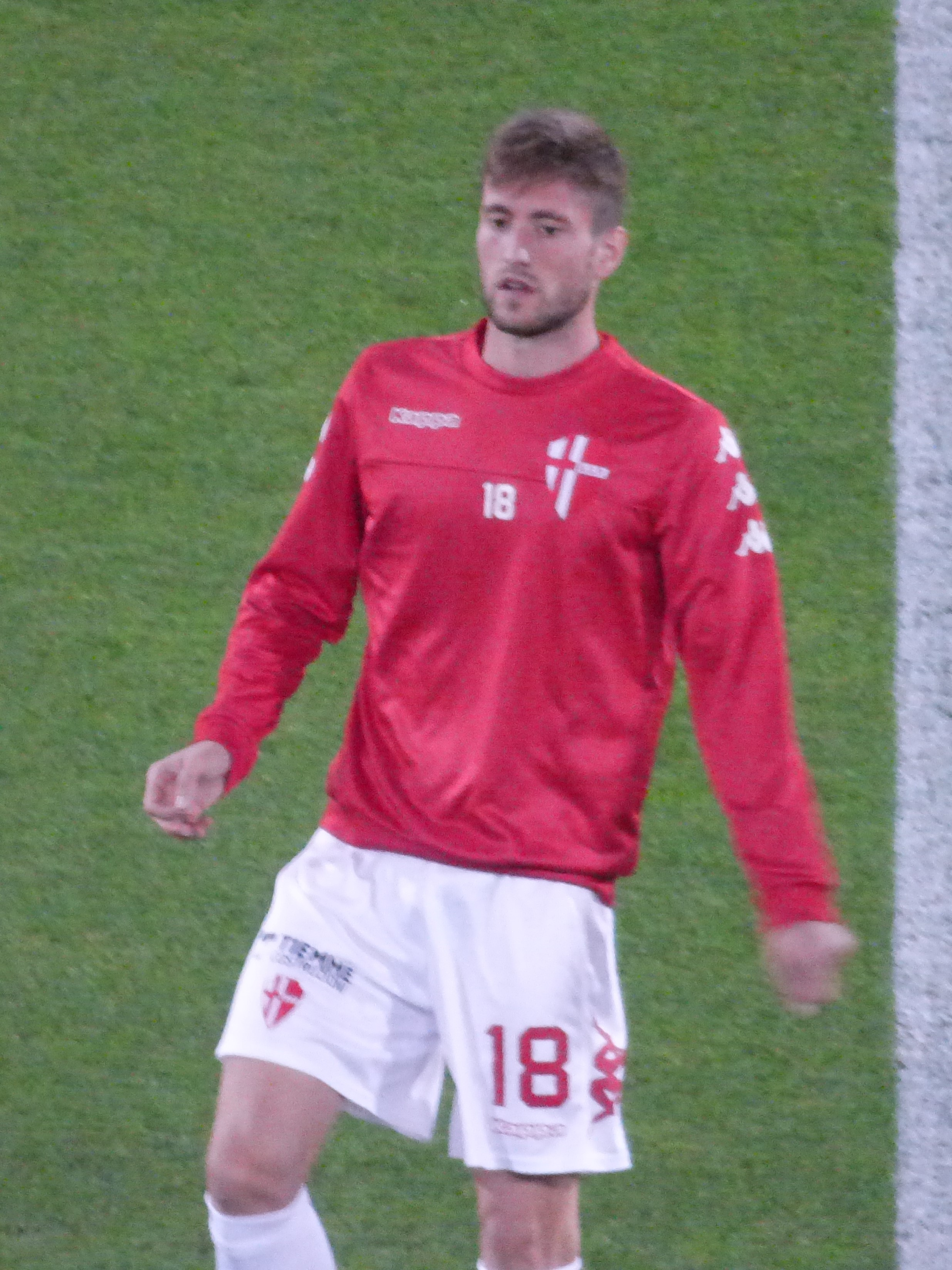
- Mazzocco with Padova in 2018

Personal information
- Date of birth: 6 October 1995 (age 31)
- Place of birth: Feltre, Italy
- Height: 1.86 m (6 ft 1 in)
- Position: Midfielder

Team information
- Current team: Dolomiti
- Number: 44

Youth career
- –2012: Montebelluna
- 2012–2014: Parma

Senior career*
Years	Team	Apps	(Gls)
2014–2019	Padova	95	(9)
2019–2021	SPAL	0	(0)
2019–2020	→ Pordenone (loan)	25	(3)
2020–2021	→ Virtus Entella (loan)	14	(0)
2021–2023	Cittadella	32	(1)
2023–2024	Avellino	13	(1)
2024	→ Latina (loan)	13	(2)
2024–2025	Foggia	22	(3)
2025–	Dolomiti	8	(0)
- * Club domestic league appearances and goals as of 30 April 2026

Davide Mazzocco (born 6 October 1995) is an Italian professional footballer who plays as a midfielder for Dolomiti.

== Club career ==
Mazzocco joined Parma U-19 team in the summer of 2012 and played for it for the next two seasons. He was never called up to the senior team. Before the 2014–15 season, he joined Padova, which was playing in Serie D at the time.

He made his Serie C debut for Padova on 13 September 2015 in a game against Pro Piacenza as a 65th-minute substitute for Marco Cunico. On 22 December 2017, he extended his Padova contract to June 2019. Padova was promoted to Serie B for the 2018–19 season, with Mazzocco making his debut at that level.

On 4 July 2019, Mazzocco signed to Serie A side SPAL for free. On the same day, he joined Pordenone on loan until 30 June 2020.

On 4 October 2020, he was loaned to Serie B club Virtus Entella.

On 31 August 2021, he joined Cittadella.

On 19 January 2023, Mazzocco signed with Avellino in Serie C.
