= Christos Alexiou =

Greek footballer (born 1998)

Personal information
- Date of birth: 30 June 2005 (age 21)
- Place of birth: Athens, Greece
- Height: 1.84 m (6 ft 0 in)
- Position: Centre-back

Team information
- Current team: AEK Athens (on loan from Inter Milan U23)
- Number: 5

Youth career
- –2021: Atromitos
- 2021–2025: Inter Milan

Senior career*
Years	Team	Apps	(Gls)
2025–	Inter Milan U23	32	(2)
2026–	→ AEK Athens (loan)	0	(0)

International career^{‡}
2021–2022	Greece U17	6	(1)
2022–2024	Greece U19	6	(3)
2024–	Greece U21	11	(1)
- * Club domestic league appearances and goals as of 30 April 2026 ‡ National team caps and goals as of 26 September 2026

Christos Alexiou (Greek: Χρήστος Αλεξίου; born 30 June 2005) is a Greek professional footballer who plays as a centre-back for Super League club AEK Athens, on loan from Inter Milan U23.

== Early life ==
Alexiou was born on 30 June 2005. Born in Athens, Greece, he is the older brother of Greek footballer Kyriakos Alexiou.

== Club career ==
As a youth player, Alexiou joined the youth academy of Atromitos, in his native Greece, helping the club's under-15 team achieve second place in the league. In 2021, he joined the youth academy of Italian side Inter, where he captained the club's under-20 team and played in the UEFA Youth League.

== International career ==
Alexiou is a Greece youth international. During March 2022, he played for the Greece national under-17 football team for 2022 UEFA European Under-17 Championship qualification. The same year, he played for the Greece national under-19 football team for 2023 UEFA European Under-19 Championship qualification.

== Style of play ==
Alexiou plays as a defender and is left-footed. Greek news website SPORT24 wrote in 2025 that he is "a left-footed stopper with height, strength and perception".
