= Matteo Spinaccè =

Italian footballer (born 2006)

Personal information
- Date of birth: 13 July 2006 (age 20)
- Place of birth: Bussolengo, Italy
- Height: 1.89 m (6 ft 2 in)
- Position: Striker

Team information
- Current team: Mantova (on loan from Inter Milan)
- Number: 7

Youth career
- Pordenone
- 2020–2025: Inter Milan

Senior career*
Years	Team	Apps	(Gls)
2025–2026	Inter Milan Under-23	26	(6)
2025–	Inter Milan	0	(0)
2026–	→ Mantova (loan)	0	(0)

International career^{‡}
2021	Italy U16	4	(3)
2022	Italy U17	2	(0)
2023–2024	Italy U18	6	(1)
2023–2025	Italy U19	3	(0)
2025–	Italy U20	2	(0)
- * Club domestic league appearances and goals as of 30 April 2026 ‡ National team caps and goals as of 22 June 2025

Matteo Spinaccè (born 13 July 2006) is an Italian professional footballer who plays as a striker for Serie B club Mantova, on loan from Inter Milan.

== Club career ==
A youth product of Pordenone's youth teams, he moved to Inter Milan's academy in 2020. On 14 February 2025, he signed his first professional contract with Inter until 2029. Je was promoted from their academy to Inter Milan Under-23 in the Serie C for the 2025–26 season, where he had 3 goals and 2 assists in his first 9 games. On 3 December 2025, he debuted with the senior Inter Milan team as a substitute in a 5–1 Coppa Italia win over Venezia.

On 12 July 2026, Spinaccè joined Serie B club Mantova on a season long loan.

== International career ==
Spinaccè is a youth international for Italy. He was called up to the Italy U20s for a set of friendlies in November 2025.

== Honours ==
Inter Milan

- Coppa Italia: 2025–26
