= Yvan Maye =

French footballer (born 2006)

Personal information
- Full name: Yvan Ezekiel Kouadio Maye
- Date of birth: 21 March 2006 (age 20)
- Place of birth: Antony, France
- Height: 1.90 m (6 ft 3 in)
- Position: Centre-back

Team information
- Current team: Monza (on loan from Inter Milan)
- Number: 5

Youth career
- –2021: AS Bondy
- 2021–2022: Paris FC
- 2022–2025: Inter Milan

Senior career*
Years	Team	Apps	(Gls)
2025–	Inter Milan U23	10	(1)
2026–	→ Monza (loan)	0	(0)
- * Club domestic league appearances and goals as of 23 August 2026

Yvan Ezekiel Kouadio Maye (born 21 March 2006) is a French professional footballer who plays as a centre-back for Serie A club Monza, on loan from Inter Milan.

== Career ==
Maye began his youth career at AS Bondy before moving to Paris FC and later joining Inter Milan's youth academy in 2022.

Ahead of the 2025–26 season, he was assigned to Inter's newly established reserve team in Serie C, making his professional debut on 31 August 2025 in a league match against Novara. On 30 November 2025, he received his first call‑up to the senior squad, appearing as an unused substitute against Pisa.

On 25 August 2026, Maye joined newly promoted Serie A side Monza on a season‑long loan.

== Career statistics ==
=== Club ===
As of match played 1 September 2026

Appearances and goals by club, season and competition
Club	Season	League			National cup (Note: Includes Coppa Italia)		Continental		Other		Total	
Club	Season	Division	Apps	Goals	Apps	Goals	Apps	Goals	Apps	Goals	Apps	Goals
Inter Milan U23	2025–26	Serie C	9	0	—		—		1 (Note: Appearance in Coppa Italia Serie C)	0	10	0
Inter Milan U23	2026–27	Serie C	1	1	—		—		1	0	2	1
Inter Milan U23	Total		10	1	—		—		2	0	12	1
Monza (loan)	2026–27	Serie A	0	0	1	0	—		—		1	0
Career total			10	1	1	0	0	0	2	0	13	1
