= Dilan Zárate =

Spanish footballer (born 2007)

Personal information
- Full name: Dilan Andrés Zárate Hidalgo
- Date of birth: 1 August 2007 (age 19)
- Place of birth: Cartagena, Colombia
- Height: 1.80 m (5 ft 11 in)
- Position: Midfielder

Team information
- Current team: Cádiz (on loan from Inter Milan)
- Number: 28

Youth career
- Expreso Rojo
- 2017–2018: Tecnifutbol
- 2018–2019: Gimnástic
- 2019–2022: Cornellà
- 2022–2023: Girona
- 2023–2025: Inter Milan

Senior career*
| Years | Team | Apps | (Gls) |
| 2025– | Inter Milan U23 | 0 | (0) |
| 2026– | → Cádiz (loan) | 1 | (0) |

International career^{‡}
| 2025– | Spain U19 | 10 | (0) |
- * Club domestic league appearances and goals as of 30 August 2026 ‡ National team caps and goals as of 11 July 2026

Dilan Andrés Zárate Hidalgo (born 1 August 2007) is a footballer who plays as a midfielder for Segunda División club Cádiz, on loan from Serie A club Inter Milan. Born in Colombia, he represents Spain at youth international level.

== Early life ==
Born in Cartagena, Colombia, Zárate began his career with hometown side Expreso Rojo before moving to Spain in 2017, at the age of 10. Living with his father, he established himself in Valls, Tarragona, Catalonia, he played for Tecnifutbol Academy and Gimnàstic de Tarragona before impressing with Cornellà.

== Club career ==
Zárate moved to Girona in 2022, where he mainly played for the club's Juvenil squads, before signing for Inter Milan in September 2023. On 3 September 2025, he renewed his contract with the latter club until 2029, and made his senior debut with the under-23 team on 30 October, coming on as a second-half substitute for Luka Topalović in a 2–1 Coppa Italia Serie C away win over Ospitaletto.

On 3 August 2026, Zárate returned to Spain after joining Segunda División side Cádiz on a one-year loan deal. He made his professional debut late in the month, starting in a 1–1 home draw against Valladolid.

== International career ==
Eligible to play for Colombia and Spain, Zárate was called up to the latter's under-19 team in November 2025. He was included in the squad for the 2026 UEFA European Under-19 Championship, playing in all five matches of the tournament and ending the competition as champions.

== Honours ==
Spain U19

- UEFA European Under-19 Championship: 2026
