= Mateusz Kowalski (footballer, born 2005) =

Polish footballer (born 2005)

Personal information
- Date of birth: 21 July 2005 (age 21)
- Place of birth: Tczew, Poland
- Height: 1.98 m (6 ft 6 in)
- Position: Striker

Team information
- Current team: Dolomiti Bellunesi (on loan from Parma)
- Number: 20

Youth career
- 2013–2016: Orły Tczew
- 2017–2020: Gryf Tczew
- 2020–2022: Jagiellonia Białystok
- 2023–2024: Parma

Senior career*
Years	Team	Apps	(Gls)
2022–2023	Jagiellonia Białystok	11	(2)
2022	Jagiellonia Białystok II	4	(1)
2024–	Parma	1	(0)
2025–2026	→ Torreense (loan)	1	(0)
2026	→ Miedź Legnica (loan)	0	(0)
2026	→ Miedź Legnica II (loan)	3	(0)
2026–	→ Dolomiti Bellunesi (loan)	6	(1)

International career^{‡}
2022	Poland U18	3	(1)
2022–2023	Poland U19	9	(1)
- * Club domestic league appearances and goals as of 21:00, 21 September 2026 (UTC) ‡ National team caps and goals as of 17 August 2024

Mateusz Kowalski (born 21 July 2005) is a Polish professional footballer who plays as a striker for Serie C Group A club Dolomiti Bellunesi, on loan from Serie A club Parma.

== Club career ==
Kowalski started his career with Polish side Jagiellonia Białystok. On 16 July 2022, he made his senior debut as an injury-time substitute in a 2–0 league win over Piast Gliwice, and scored his first goal for the club less than a minute after entering the pitch.

On 31 January 2023, Kowalski transferred to Serie B club Parma for a reported fee of €1 million. His first competitive senior team appearance came on 11 August 2024, in a 0–1 Coppa Italia first round loss to Palermo. On 31 August, Kowalski made his first league appearance and start for Parma in a 1–2 defeat against Napoli. Shortly after, in September 2024, he tore his ACL while training with Poland's under-20 team.

After recovering, Kowalski was sent on a season-long loan to Portuguese side Torreense in August 2025. On 5 February 2026, he moved on loan to I liga club Miedź Legnica, with an option to buy, for the rest of the season. He made three appearances for Miedź's reserve team before returning to Parma in June 2026.

On 18 July 2026, Kowalski joined Serie C newcomers Dolomiti Bellunesi on loan for the remainder of the season.

== International career ==
Kowalski made his debut for the Poland U18s in a 1–0 Lafarge Foot Avenir win over against Scotland on 21 September 2022.

He represented Poland at the 2023 UEFA European Under-19 Championship in Malta, appearing once, in a 1–1 group stage draw with Italy.

== Style of play ==
Kowalski mainly operates as a striker. He is known for his agility.

== Personal life ==
He is a native of Tczew, Poland.

== Career statistics ==
As of match played 21 September 2026

Appearances and goals by club, season and competition
Club	Season	League			National cup (Note: Includes Polish Cup, Coppa Italia, Taça de Portugal)		Continental		Other		Total	
Club	Season	Division	Apps	Goals	Apps	Goals	Apps	Goals	Apps	Goals	Apps	Goals
Jagiellonia Białystok	2022–23	Ekstraklasa	11	2	1	0	—		—		12	2
Jagiellonia Białystok II	2022–23	III liga, gr. I	4	1	—		—		—		4	1
Parma	2024–25	Serie A	1	0	1	0	—		—		2	0
Torreense (loan)	2025–26	Liga Portugal 2	1	0	1	0	—		—		2	0
Miedź Legnica (loan)	2025–26	I liga	0	0	—		—		—		0	0
Miedź Legnica II (loan)	2025–26	III liga, gr. III	3	0	—		—		—		3	0
Dolomiti Bellunesi (loan)	2026–27	Serie C Group A	6	1	—		—		—		6	1
Career total			26	4	3	0	0	0	0	0	29	3
