= Simone Auriletto =

Italian footballer

Personal information
- Date of birth: 30 December 1998 (age 27)
- Place of birth: Turin, Italy
- Height: 1.88 m (6 ft 2 in)
- Position: Centre-back

Team information
- Current team: Renate
- Number: 5

Youth career
- –2017: Torino

Senior career*
Years	Team	Apps	(Gls)
2017–2018	Torino	0	(0)
2017–2018	→ Reggina (loan)	6	(0)
2018–2019	Matera	13	(0)
2019–2022	Pro Vercelli	83	(1)
2022–2023	Avellino	27	(1)
2023–	Renate	93	(2)

International career
2013	Italy U-15	5	(0)
2013	Italy U-16	2	(0)
2016	Italy U-19	1	(0)
- * Club domestic league appearances and goals as of 29 April 2026

Simone Auriletto (born 30 December 1998) is an Italian footballer who plays as a centre-back for Serie C Group A club Renate.

== Club career ==
He made his Serie C debut for Reggina on 30 December 2017 in a game against Catanzaro.

On 31 August 2018, he signed with the Serie C club Matera.

On 21 February 2019, he joined Serie C Club Pro Vercelli.

On 11 July 2022, Auriletto moved to Avellino on a two-year contract.
