= Stefano Vecchi =

Italian footballer and manager

Personal information
- Full name: Stefano Vecchi
- Date of birth: 20 July 1971 (age 55)
- Place of birth: Bergamo, Italy
- Position: Midfielder

Team information
- Current team: Inter Milan U23 (head coach)

Youth career
- 1983–1986: Ponte San Pietro
- 1986–1990: Inter Milan

Senior career*
Years	Team	Apps	(Gls)
1990–1993	Inter Milan	0	(0)
1990–1991	→ Oltrepò (loan)	33	(0)
1991–1992	→ Spezia (loan)	33	(1)
1992–1993	→ Arezzo (loan)	0	(0)
1993–1997	Fiorenzuola	132	(1)
1997–1999	Brescello	59	(1)
1999–2003	SPAL	122	(0)
2003–2004	Pavia	10	(0)
2004–2005	Pergocrema	13	(2)

Managerial career
- 2005–2006: Mapello
- 2006–2009: Colognese
- 2009–2011: Tritium
- 2011–2012: SPAL
- 2012–2013: Südtirol
- 2013–2014: Carpi
- 2014–2018: Inter Milan Primavera
- 2016: Inter Milan (caretaker)
- 2017: Inter Milan (caretaker)
- 2018: Venezia
- 2019–2021: Südtirol
- 2021–2023: Feralpisalò
- 2023–2025: Vicenza
- 2025–: Inter Milan U23
- * Club domestic league appearances and goals

Stefano Vecchi (born 20 July 1971) is an Italian retired professional footballer turned coach, who is the head coach of Serie C Group A club Inter Milan Under-23.

== Playing career ==
An Inter youth product, Vecchi had an unremarkable career as a central midfielder in the lower leagues of Italian football, not going any further than Serie C1 and narrowly missing a historical promotion to Serie B during his stint at Fiorenzuola. He retired in 2005.

== Coaching career ==
After his retirement, Vecchi started a coaching career in the amateur leagues of Lombardy. He had a breakthrough during his two-year period at Tritium, leading the small club from Trezzo sull'Adda to two consecutive promotions from Serie D to Lega Pro Prima Divisione (ex-Serie C1) before accepting an offer from fallen giants SPAL, a former team of his as a player; however, this season, characterized by financial and off-field issues, ended with relegation to Lega Pro Seconda Divisione.

He successively took another coaching role at Südtirol, reaching the promotion playoffs in his only season. The team lost to Carpi, Vecchi's future employer. The Serie B newcomers offered him their managerial spot despite his lack of a valid coaching license to serve as head coach in the second tier of Italy. However, his stint at Carpi was cut short in March 2014 when he was removed from managerial duties due to disappointing results.

In mid-2014, he joined former club Inter's non-playing staff as coach of the Primavera under-19 team, which he led to victory at the 2015 Torneo di Viareggio and the 2016 Coppa Italia Primavera.

In November 2016, he also served as caretaker manager for the first team, filling in after Frank de Boer's dismissal for the 2016–17 UEFA Europa League game against Southampton (a 1–2 loss) and a Serie A league game against Crotone (ended in a 3–0 win). He was then once again appointed as caretaker on 9 May 2017 for the final three games of the season, in place of Stefano Pioli. Vecchi also led the Primavera team to win the Campionato Nazionale Primavera on 11 June 2017, after his caretaker spell with the first team had ended.

Vecchi left Inter in July 2018 to accept an offer as head coach of Venezia in the Serie B league; his experience was, however, short-lived, as he was dismissed on 11 October 2018 due to poor results.

In 2019, he took over at Serie C club Südtirol, which he guided for two full seasons in the Italian third division with positive results. He left the club in June 2021.

Vecchi successively took charge of Serie C side Feralpisalò in June 2021, guiding them to a historic promotion to Serie B in 2023; he was dismissed on 23 October 2023 following a negative start in the club's 2023–24 Serie B campaign.

On 20 December 2023, Vecchi was unveiled as the new head coach of Serie C club Vicenza, signing a contract valid until 30 June 2025.

On 24 July 2025, Vecchi was named the inaugural head coach of Inter Milan's under-23 team, set to compete in Serie C.

== Managerial statistics ==
As of match played 3 November 2025.

Managerial record by team and tenure
Team	Nat	From	To	Record							
Team	Nat	From	To	G	W	D	L	GF	GA	GD	Win %
Mapello	(Italy)	1 July 2005	1 June 2006	34	21	7	6	53	22	+31	61.76
Colognese	(Italy)	1 June 2006	2 June 2009	115	49	38	28	169	137	+32	42.61
Tritium	(Italy)	2 August 2009	14 June 2011	77	46	21	10	130	61	+69	59.74
SPAL	(Italy)	17 June 2011	14 June 2012	44	17	11	16	46	44	+2	38.64
Südtirol	(Italy)	14 June 2012	4 July 2013	38	14	13	11	49	43	+6	36.84
Carpi	(Italy)	12 July 2013	17 March 2014	30	11	6	13	33	38	−5	36.67
Inter Milan (caretaker)	(Italy)	1 November 2016	7 November 2016	2	1	0	1	4	2	+2	50.00
Inter Milan (caretaker)	(Italy)	9 May 2017	1 June 2017	3	2	0	1	9	5	+4	66.67
Venezia	(Italy)	14 June 2018	12 October 2018	7	1	1	5	5	9	−4	14.29
Südtirol	(Italy)	27 June 2019	4 June 2021	76	41	15	20	122	70	+52	53.95
Feralpisalò	(Italy)	18 June 2021	23 October 2023	101	48	23	30	128	95	+33	47.52
Vicenza	(Italy)	20 December 2023	26 June 2025	73	46	18	9	103	45	+58	63.01
Inter Milan U23	(Italy)	24 July 2025	Present	14	8	4	2	23	14	+9	57.14
Total				614	305	157	152	874	585	+289	49.67
