= Leonardo Bovo =

Italian footballer (born 2005)

Personal information
- Date of birth: 7 May 2005 (age 21)
- Place of birth: Italy
- Height: 1.87 m (6 ft 2 in)
- Position: Midfielder

Team information
- Current team: Inter
- Number: 45

Youth career
- –2021: Chievo
- 2021–2025: Inter

Senior career*
Years	Team	Apps	(Gls)
2025–	Inter U23	20	(0)
2025–	Inter	0	(0)

International career^{‡}
2022–2023	Italy U18	6	(1)
2023	Italy U19	1	(0)
- * Club domestic league appearances and goals as of 21 February 2026 ‡ National team caps and goals as of 9 August 2023

Leonardo Bovo (born 7 May 2005) is an Italian professional footballer who plays as a midfielder for Inter.

== Early life ==
Bovo was born on 7 May 2005. Born in Italy, he is the son of Italian footballer Raffaello Bovo.

== Club career ==
As a youth player, Bovo joined the youth academy of Chievo. Following his stint there, he joined the youth academy of Serie A side Inter ahead of the 2021–22 season and was promoted to the club's senior team in 2025.

== International career ==
Bovo is an Italy youth international. On 9 August 2023, he debuted for the Italy national under-19 football team during a 3–0 home friendly win over the Albania national under-19 football team.

== Style of play ==
Bovo plays as a midfielder. Italian newspaper Sprint e Sport wrote in 2025 that "he is a modern midfielder, approximately 1.87 meters tall, with a well-trained foot, a playmaker's nature, and the ability to move into the attacking midfield".

== Honours ==
Inter Milan

- Coppa Italia: 2025–26
