= 2002 Torneo di Viareggio =

2002 Torneo Mondiale di Calcio Coppa Carnevale
54° Torneo di Viareggio

Tournament details
- Host country: Italy
- City: Viareggio
- Dates: January 28, 2002 - February 11, 2002
- Teams: 40

Final positions
- Champions: (Italy) Inter Milan
- Runners-up: (Italy) Torino
- Third place: (Italy) Perugia
- Fourth place: (Italy) Fiorentina

Tournament statistics
- Matches played: 76
- Goals scored: 203 (2.67 per match)

The 2002 winners of the Torneo di Viareggio (in English, the Viareggio Tournament, officially the Viareggio Cup World Football Tournament Coppa Carnevale), the annual youth football tournament held in Viareggio, Tuscany, are listed below.

== Format ==
The 40 teams are seeded in 10 pools, split up into 5-pool groups. Each team from a pool meets the others in a single tie. The winning club from each pool and three best runners-up from both group A and group B progress to the final knockout stage. All matches in the final rounds are single tie. The Round of 16 envisions penalties and no extra time, while the rest of the final round matches include 30 minutes extra time with Golden goal rule and penalties to be played if the draw between teams still holds. Semifinal losing teams play 3rd-place final with penalties after regular time. The winning sides play the final with extra time, noGolden goal rule and repeat the match if the draw holds.

== Participating teams ==
Italian teams

- (Italy) Atalanta
- (Italy) Bari
- (Italy) Brescia
- (Italy) Castel di Sangro
- (Italy) Cittadella
- (Italy) Empoli
- (Italy) Fiorentina
- (Italy) Inter Milan
- (Italy) Juventus
- (Italy) Lazio
- (Italy) Milan
- (Italy) Napoli
- (Italy) Palermo
- (Italy) Parma
- (Italy) Perugia
- (Italy) Piacenza
- (Italy) Reggina
- (Italy) Roma
- (Italy) Salernitana
- (Italy) Ternana
- (Italy) Torino
- (Italy) Verona
- (Italy) Vicenza

European teams

- (Belgium) Anderlecht
- (Germany) Bayern Munich
- (North Macedonia) Belasica
- (Spain) Deportivo Español
- (Netherlands) Feyenoord
- (France) Nice
- (Czech Republic) Slavia Prague
- (Serbia) Red Star Belgrade
- (Romania) UTA Arad

Asian teams

- (Palestine) Jerusalem
- (Israel) Maccabi Haifa

African teams

- (Ghana) Great African Stars

American teams

- (United States) New York United
- (Mexico) Pumas
- (Brazil) Desportiva Capixaba
- (Colombia) Independiente Santa Fe

Oceanian teams

- (Australia) APIA Tigers

== Group stage ==
=== Group 1 ===
Team	Pts	Pld	W	D	L	GF	GA	GD
(Italy) Milan	9	3	3	0	0	14	3	+11
(Italy) Salernitana	6	3	2	0	1	11	2	+9
(Netherlands) Feyenoord	3	3	1	0	2	2	8	-6
(United States) New York United	0	3	0	0	3	1	15	-14

=== Group 2 ===
Team	Pts	Pld	W	D	L	GF	GA	GD
(Italy) Napoli	9	3	3	0	0	8	1	+7
(France) Nice	4	3	1	1	1	6	5	+1
(North Macedonia) Belasica	4	3	1	1	1	5	9	-4
(Italy) Castel di Sangro	0	3	0	0	3	3	7	-4

=== Group 3 ===
Team	Pts	Pld	W	D	L	GF	GA	GD
(Italy) Torino	7	3	2	1	0	5	2	+3
(Italy) Ternana	4	3	1	1	1	5	4	+1
(Italy) Reggina	3	3	0	3	0	1	1	0
(Colombia) Independiente Santa Fe	1	3	0	1	2	0	4	-4

=== Group 4 ===
Team	Pts	Pld	W	D	L	GF	GA	GD
(Romania) UTA Arad	7	3	2	1	0	4	2	+2
(Italy) Fiorentina	6	3	2	0	1	11	2	+9
(Italy) Verona	4	3	1	1	1	7	3	+4
(Palestine) Jerusalem	0	3	0	0	3	2	17	-15

=== Group 5 ===
Team	Pts	Pld	W	D	L	GF	GA	GD
(Italy) Cittadella	7	3	2	1	0	5	1	+4
(Italy) Vicenza	5	3	1	2	0	6	2	+4
(Italy) Piacenza	4	3	1	1	1	3	2	+1
(Australia) APIA Tigers	0	3	0	0	3	0	9	-9

=== Group 6 ===
Team	Pts	Pld	W	D	L	GF	GA	GD
(Brazil) Desportiva Capixaba	7	3	2	1	0	5	1	+4
(Italy) Perugia	6	3	2	0	1	4	2	+2
(Germany) Bayern Munich	3	3	1	0	2	2	6	-4
(Italy) Roma	1	3	0	1	2	3	5	-2

=== Group 7 ===
Team	Pts	Pld	W	D	L	GF	GA	GD
(Italy) Inter Milan	7	3	2	1	0	8	3	+5
(Italy) Lazio	7	3	2	1	0	4	2	+2
(Serbia) Red Star Belgrade	3	3	1	0	2	4	4	0
(Ghana) Great African Stars	0	3	0	0	3	1	8	-7

=== Group 8 ===
Team	Pts	Pld	W	D	L	GF	GA	GD
(Italy) Parma	5	3	1	2	0	8	3	+5
(Italy) Juventus	5	3	1	2	0	5	3	+2
(Italy) Bari	4	3	1	1	1	2	6	-4
(Mexico) Pumas	1	3	0	1	2	1	4	-3

=== Group 9 ===
Team	Pts	Pld	W	D	L	GF	GA	GD
(Italy) Atalanta	9	3	3	0	0	8	2	+6
(Italy) Empoli	4	3	1	1	1	4	3	+1
(Belgium) Anderlecht	2	3	0	2	1	4	7	-3
(Israel) Maccabi Haifa	1	3	0	1	2	2	6	-4

=== Group 10 ===
Team	Pts	Pld	W	D	L	GF	GA	GD
(Czech Republic) Slavia Prague	6	3	2	0	1	3	1	+2
(Italy) Palermo	4	3	1	1	1	1	1	0
(Spain) Deportivo Español	4	3	1	1	1	2	2	0
(Italy) Brescia	2	3	0	2	1	1	3	-2

== Knockout stage ==
Round of 16
6 February
(Italy) Napoli	0 (2)
(Italy) Perugia (pen)	0 (4)
6 February
(Italy) Milan	2
(Italy) Lazio	4
6 February
(Italy) Cittadella	0
(Italy) Juventus	3
6 February
(Italy) Torino	3
(Italy) Parma	2
6 February
(Italy) Inter Milan (pen)	0 (6)
(Italy) Salernitana	0 (5)
6 February
(Italy) Atalanta	1
(Italy) Vicenza	0
6 February
(Czech Republic) Slavia Prague	1(3)
(Italy) Fiorentina (pen)	1 (5)
6 February
(Brazil) Desportiva Capixaba	0
(Romania) UTA Arad	1

Quarter-finals
7 February
(Italy) Perugia	1
(Italy) Lazio	0
7 February
(Italy) Juventus	1
(Italy) Torino	2
7 February
(Italy) Inter	2
(Italy) Atalanta	0
7 February
(Italy) Fiorentina (g.g. a.e.t.)	1
(Romania) UTA Arad	0

Semi-finals
9 February
(Italy) Perugia	1
(Italy) Torino	2
9 February
(Italy) Inter Milan (pen)	0 (3)
(Italy) Fiorentina	0 (2)

Final
11 February
(Italy) Torino	1
(Italy) Inter Milan	2
Third place
11 February
(Italy) Perugia	1
(Italy) Fiorentina	0

== Champions ==
Torneo di Viareggio 2002 Champions

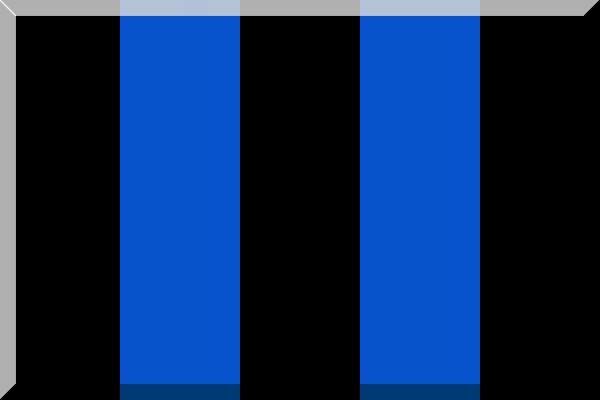

F.C. Internazionale Milan
4th time
