= Leon Jakirović =

Croatian association football player (born 2008)

Personal information
- Date of birth: 16 January 2008 (age 18)
- Place of birth: Požega, Croatia
- Height: 1.91 m (6 ft 3 in)
- Position: Defender

Team information
- Current team: Inter Milan U23
- Number: 86

Youth career
- –2024: Dinamo Zagreb

Senior career*
Years	Team	Apps	(Gls)
2024–2026	Dinamo Zagreb	3	(0)
2026–	Inter Milan U23	6	(0)

International career^{‡}
2023	Croatia U15	2	(0)
2024–2025	Croatia U17	13	(0)
2025–	Croatia U18	4	(0)
- * Club domestic league appearances and goals as of 00:15 (UTC) 3 October 2026 ‡ National team caps and goals as of 15 November 2025

Leon Jakirović (born 16 January 2008) is a Croatian professional footballer who plays as a defender for Serie C Group A club Inter Milan U23.

== Club career ==
A youth product of GNK Dinamo Zagreb, he started training with the first-team squad at the age of 16 years-old. He made his senior league debut in a 3–2 win over Slaven Belupo on 18 May 2024. He made his debut in the UEFA Champions League on 29 January 2025 in a 2–1 win against AC Milan.

On 26 January 2026, Jakirović joined Serie A side Inter Milan on a permanent basis and was assigned to the club's reserve team.

== International career ==
Jakirović represented Croatia at the 2025 FIFA U-17 World Cup, where they were eliminated in the Round of 32.

== Personal life ==
He is the son of the Bosnian footballer and manager Sergej Jakirović. His grandfather, Enver, was also a professional footballer.

== Career statistics ==
As of match played 14 August 2025

Appearances and goals by club, season and competition
Club	Season	League			National cup		Europe		Other		Total	
Club	Season	Division	Apps	Goals	Apps	Goals	Apps	Goals	Apps	Goals	Apps	Goals
Dinamo Zagreb	2023–24	HNL	2	0	—		0	0	—		2	0
Dinamo Zagreb	2024–25	HNL	1	0	—		1 (Note: Appearance in UEFA Champions League)	0	—		2	0
Dinamo Zagreb	2025–26	HNL	0	0	0	0	0	0	0	0	0	0
Dinamo Zagreb	Total		3	0	0	0	1	0	0	0	4	0
Inter Milan U23	2026–27	Serie C	0	0	—		—		1 (Note: Appearance(s) in Coppa Italia Serie C)	0	1	0
Career total			3	0	0	0	1	0	1	0	5	0
