= Ferdinando Mastroianni =

Italian footballer

Personal information
- Date of birth: 21 March 1992 (age 34)
- Place of birth: Maddaloni, Italy
- Height: 1.93 m (6 ft 4 in)
- Position: Forward

Team information
- Current team: Grosseto
- Number: 10

Youth career
- –2009: Pescara
- 2009–2010: Ancona
- 2010–2011: Bari

Senior career*
Years	Team	Apps	(Gls)
2011–2012	Bari	0	(0)
2011	→ Montichiari (loan)	14	(3)
2012	→ Vibonese (loan)	13	(2)
2012–2014	Gavorrano	3	(0)
2013	→ Bellaria IM (loan)	4	(1)
2014–2015	Clodiense	30	(6)
2015–2016	Este	38	(24)
2016–2018	Carpi	0	(0)
2016–2017	→ AlbinoLeffe (loan)	38	(4)
2017–2018	→ Pro Piacenza (loan)	31	(1)
2018–2020	Pro Patria	57	(12)
2020–2022	Lecco	48	(7)
2022–2023	Fiorenzuola	51	(9)
2023–2025	Latina	53	(10)
2025–2026	Pro Patria	37	(11)
2026–	Grosseto	1	(0)
- * Club domestic league appearances and goals as of 23 August 2026

Ferdinando Mastroianni (born 21 March 1992) is an Italian footballer who plays as a forward for Serie C Group B club Grosseto.

== Club career ==
He made his Serie C debut for AlbinoLeffe on 3 September 2016 in a game against Padova.

On 20 July 2020, he joined Lecco.

On 10 January 2022, he moved to Fiorenzuola.
