= Dolomiti Bellunesi (football club) =

Italian football club

- Full name: Dolomiti Bellunesi s.r.l.
- Nicknames: Rosaverdi (the pink and greens)
- Founded: 2021
- Ground: Stadio Polisportivo, Belluno, Italy; Stadio Zugni Tauro, Feltre, Italy
- Capacity: 2,585 (Belluno); 1,300 (Feltre)
- Chairman: Paolo De Cian
- Manager: Andrea Bonatti
- League: Serie C Group A
- 2025–26: Serie C Group A, 17th of 20
| Home colours | Away colours | Third colours |

Dolomiti Bellunesi is an Italian association football club representing the cities of Belluno, Sedico and Feltre, Veneto. They currently play in Serie C Group A.

== History ==
The club was founded in 2021 as Dolomiti Bellunesi Società Sportiva Dilettantistica, following the merge of Belluno, San Giorgio Sedico and Union Feltre.

On 4 May 2025, Dolomiti Bellunesi were crowned Serie D Group C champions, thus winning promotion to Serie C for the first time in the club's history.

== Current squad ==
As of 1 September 2026

Note: Flags indicate national team as defined under FIFA eligibility rules; some limited exceptions apply. Players may hold more than one non-FIFA nationality.

| No. | Pos. | Nation | Player |
|---|---|---|---|
| 1 | GK | LTU | Ernestas Lysionok (on loan from Genoa) |
| 3 | DF | ITA | Francesco Migliardi |
| 4 | DF | NED | Noah Lewis |
| 5 | DF | ITA | Nicolas Trabucchi (on loan from Parma) |
| 6 | DF | ITA | Matteo Barbini (on loan from Genoa) |
| 7 | MF | ITA | Thomas Cossalter |
| 8 | MF | AUS | Louis Agosti |
| 9 | FW | ALB | Eljon Toçi |
| 10 | MF | ITA | Luca Clemenza |
| 11 | FW | ITA | Diego Sia |
| 12 | GK | ITA | Luca Sonzogni |
| 19 | DF | ITA | Daniele Mignanelli |
| 20 | FW | POL | Mateusz Kowalski (on loan from Parma) |
| 21 | MF | ITA | Nicola Masut |
| 22 | GK | ITA | Filippo Coan |

| No. | Pos. | Nation | Player |
|---|---|---|---|
| 23 | DF | ITA | Davide Mondonico |
| 24 | DF | ITA | Nicolò Gobetti |
| 25 | MF | SEN | Racine Ba |
| 27 | MF | ITA | Matteo Saccani |
| 29 | GK | ITA | Lorenzo Abati |
| 30 | MF | ITA | Mattia Morreale |
| 32 | DF | ITA | Alberto Lattanzio |
| 42 | MF | ITA | Luca Montenegro (on loan from Fiorentina) |
| 44 | MF | ITA | Davide Mazzocco |
| 45 | FW | ITA | Taha Zidouh (on loan from Modena) |
| 47 | DF | ITA | Christian Garofalo (on loan from Napoli) |
| 49 | FW | ITA | Kevin Casanova |
| 77 | FW | ALG | Zyed Beltaief |
| 99 | FW | BRA | Felipe Estrella |
| — | DF | ITA | Luca Milesi |

=== Out on loan ===
Note: Flags indicate national team as defined under FIFA eligibility rules; some limited exceptions apply. Players may hold more than one non-FIFA nationality.

| No. / Pos. / Nation / Player; — / FW / NGR / Taiwo Olonisakin (at Mestre until 30 June 2027) | No. / Pos. / Nation / Player; — / FW / ITA / Francesco Pio Petito (at Foggia until 30 June 2027) |

== Colors and badge ==
Dolomiti Bellunesi uses pink, green, and black as its team colours. Pink represents the enrosadira, a ladin word which refers to the natural phenomenon where the Dolomites take on pink and orange hues at sunrise and sunset due to the peculiar composition of the dolostone. Green symbolizes the forests and valleys surrounding the peaks, while black reflects the dark tones found as well in the dolomite rock formations. Usually pink predominates on home jerseys, green on away jerseys and black is used for third kits.
