= Riccardo Melgrati =

Italian footballer (born 1994)

Personal information
- Date of birth: 17 June 1994 (age 32)
- Place of birth: Monza, Italy
- Height: 1.90 m (6 ft 3 in)
- Position: Goalkeeper

Team information
- Current team: Inter Milan U23
- Number: 1

Youth career
- 2003–2012: Inter Milan
- 2012–2013: Cesena

Senior career*
Years	Team	Apps	(Gls)
2013–2018	Cesena	0	(0)
2013–2014	→ Como (loan)	28	(0)
2014–2015	→ South Tyrol (loan)	33	(0)
2015–2016	→ Pro Vercelli (loan)	4	(0)
2016–2017	→ Prato (loan)	29	(0)
2018–2019	Arezzo	0	(0)
2019	Siena	2	(0)
2020	AE Prat	2	(0)
2021	Arezzo	2	(0)
2021–2022	Imolese	8	(0)
2022	Pontedera	14	(0)
2022–2024	Lecco	56	(0)
2024–2025	SPAL	13	(0)
2025	→ Lucchese (loan)	13	(0)
2025–	Inter Milan U23	16	(0)

International career
2010	Italy U17	4	(0)
2013	Italy U19	1	(0)
- * Club domestic league appearances and goals as of 30 April 2026

Riccardo Melgrati (born 17 June 1994) is an Italian footballer who plays as a goalkeeper for Serie C Group A club Inter Milan U23.

== Club career ==
=== Inter Milan ===
Born in Monza, Lombardy, Melgrati started his career at Lombard club Inter Milan. He completed with fellow youth player Francesco Anacoura from 2004 to 2008 (left for Pavia), Raffaele Dalle Vedove from 2008 to 2012 (Melgrati left Inter) as well as Matteo Cincilla from 2009 to 2012 (ditto.). The players were the member the under-18 team for Berretti League in 2011–12 season. They also training with the reserve team in summer 2010, as Raffaele Di Gennaro and Alberto Gallinetta were trained with the first team. Melgrati and Cincilla also played for the reserve team (under-19 team) in 2011–12 season (3 times each), due to the injury of Di Gennaro and Andrea Sala. Moreover, Melgrati was the fifth goalkeeper for Inter in 2011–12 UEFA Champions League as List B player (de facto the fourth after the injury of Di Gennaro; Tornaghi and Viviano were not in the European squad). Melgrati was the backup for Cincilla and Dalle Vedove in Berretti League finals in May 2012; Melgrati did not receive call-up to the reserve league finals in June 2012.

=== Cesena ===
On 23 August 2012 Melgrati was signed by Serie B club Cesena in co-ownership deal for €500, in 2-year contract. Melgrati was the first choice of the reserve team, ahead Marco Quadrelli and overage player Emmanuel Pontet. Melgrati also wore no.33 for the first team. In June 2013 Melgrati was acquired by Cesena outright for €750,000. Cesena had also signed 50% "card" of Thomas Pedrabissi for another €1 million; 50% "card" of Yago Del Piero for €750,000; Inter bought back Luca Caldirola for €2.5 million. Inter had sold Cincilla (January 2013), Melgrati (June 2013) outright successively and Dalle Vedove in co-ownership (in July) within a year.

=== Como (loan) ===
On 11 July 2013 Melgrati left for Como in temporary deal from Cesena.

=== Südtirol (loan) ===
On 26 July 2014 he was signed by Südtirol. Before he left the club he wore no.94 shirt for Cesena.

=== Pro Vercelli (loan) ===
On 30 July 2015 he was signed by Pro Vercelli in a temporary deal.

=== Prato (loan) ===
In the summer of 2016 goes on loan to Prato.

=== Siena ===
On 24 January 2019, he signed with Siena until the end of the 2018–19 season.

=== Return to Arezzo ===
On 30 January 2021, he returned to Arezzo.

=== Imolese ===
On 24 September 2021, he signed with Imolese.

=== Pontedera ===
On 31 January 2022, Melgrati moved to Pontedera.

=== Lecco ===
On 15 July 2022, Melgrati joined Lecco.

=== SPAL ===
On 9 August 2024, Melgrati signed a two-season contract with SPAL.

=== Inter Milan U23 ===
On 25 July 2025, Melgrati returned to his boyhood club Inter Milan, joining the newly established under-23 team.

== International career ==
Melgrati played twice for the Italy U17 side in 2011 UEFA European Under-17 Championship qualification, ahead Luca Lezzerini. Pasquale Salerno used Alessio Cragno and Lezzerini in the next stage of qualification. Melgrati was recalled in March 2013 for Italy U19 team for a friendly. He was the third keeper in 2013 UEFA European Under-19 Championship elite qualification, behind Cragno and Pierluigi Gollini.
