= Giuseppe Prestia =

Italian footballer

Personal information
- Date of birth: 13 November 1993 (age 32)
- Place of birth: Palermo, Italy
- Height: 1.90 m (6 ft 3 in)
- Position: Centre back

Team information
- Current team: Inter Milan U23
- Number: 19

Youth career
- –2012: Palermo

Senior career*
Years	Team	Apps	(Gls)
2010–2013	Palermo	0	(0)
2012–2013	→ Ascoli (loan)	25	(0)
2013–2015	Parma	1	(0)
2013–2014	→ Crotone (loan)	6	(0)
2014	→ Oțelul Galați (loan)	14	(0)
2016	Petrolul Ploiești	5	(0)
2016–2017	Catanzaro	35	(2)
2017–2018	Virtus Francavilla	35	(1)
2018–2022	Alessandria	113	(3)
2022–2025	Cesena	102	(8)
2025–	Inter Milan U23	30	(0)

International career
2009	Italy U16	6	(0)
2011	Italy U18	3	(0)
2011	Italy U19	7	(0)
2012	Italy U20	1	(0)
- * Club domestic league appearances and goals as of 30 April 2026

Giuseppe Prestia (born 13 November 1993) is an Italian footballer who plays as a centre back and captains Serie C Group A club Inter Milan U23.

== Club career ==
Prestia is a youth product of hometown club Palermo, and also served as team captain for the Primavera squad. He made his senior debut on 15 December 2010, playing the full 90 minutes in a 2010–11 UEFA Europa League game against FC Lausanne-Sport under head coach Delio Rossi.

In June 2012, he was loaned out to Serie B outfit Ascoli in order to make him gain more first team experience. He made his debut on 1 September against Bari.

At the end of the 2012–13 season it was announced that Prestia would not return to Palermo, moving permanently to Serie A side Parma. A month after his move to Parma, he joined Serie B team F.C. Crotone on a co-ownership deal.

In February 2014 Giuseppe moved to Oțelul Galați on a 6-month loan and the Romanian football club had the option to buy him for a two-year contract. In June 2014 Prestia returned to Parma.

He made his Serie A debut on 11 April 2015, playing the final five minutes in a 1–0 home win to league toppers Juventus. He found himself without a team by the end of the season, after Parma declared bankruptcy and was cancelled from the Italian football pyramid. In January 2016, he agreed to return in Romania to play for Petrolul Ploiești until the end of the season.

In June 2016, he moved back to Italy to accept a one-year contract with Lega Pro club Catanzaro.

On 22 July 2022, Prestia signed a two-season contract with Cesena.

On 21 July 2025, Prestia's contract with Inter Milan was officially registered with the Lega Serie A, with the defender set to be part of the club's reserve team. The club officialised the deal on 25 July 2025.

== International career ==
Prestia represented Italy at youth level, being part of U-16, U-18 and U-19 squads between 2009 and 2011.

== Honours ==
Cesena

- Serie C: 2023–24 (group B)
- Supercoppa di Serie C: 2024
