= Luka Topalović =

Slovenian footballer (born 2006)

Personal information
- Date of birth: 23 February 2006 (age 20)
- Place of birth: Slovenj Gradec, Slovenia
- Height: 1.87 m (6 ft 2 in)
- Position: Midfielder

Team information
- Current team: Carrarese (on loan from Inter Milan)
- Number: 17

Youth career
- Korotan Prevalje
- –2019: Maribor
- 2019–2020: Bistrica
- 2020–2023: Domžale
- 2024–2025: Inter Milan

Senior career*
Years	Team	Apps	(Gls)
2022–2024	Domžale	47	(3)
2024–	Inter Milan	2	(0)
2025–2026	Inter Milan U23 (res.)	34	(4)
2026–	→ Carrarese (loan)	10	(1)

International career^{‡}
2021–2022	Slovenia U16	6	(0)
2022–2023	Slovenia U17	11	(3)
2023–2025	Slovenia U19	19	(6)
2025–	Slovenia U21	11	(1)
- * Club domestic league appearances and goals as of 10 November 2026 ‡ National team caps and goals as of 2 October 2026

Luka Topalović (born 23 February 2006) is a Slovenian professional footballer who plays as a midfielder for Serie B club Carrarese, on loan from Inter Milan.

In October 2023, The Guardian listed Topalović among the top 60 best young talents born in 2006 in world football.

== Club career ==
=== Domžale ===
Following his performances for Domžale's under-17 team, Topalović made his professional debut for the club in May 2022, aged 16 years and two months. In March 2023, he extended his contract with the club until 2026. On 28 April 2023, Topalović scored his first senior goal in a 1–1 league draw with Gorica. In the occasion, he became the youngest goalscorer of the season.

During the 2023–24 season, Topalović established himself as a regular starter for Domžale, scoring two goals and four assists in 37 matches in all competitions.

=== Inter Milan ===
On 3 July 2024, Topalović was registered as a new player of Serie A side Inter Milan on the Lega Serie A's transfer portal; the deal was publicly announced on 8 July, as the player joined the Italian club on a permanent basis. The transfer allegedly commanded a fee in the region of €1–2 million. He was initially assigned to Inter's under-20 squad. On 23 May 2025, Topalović made his first team debut, coming on as an 80th-minute substitute in the last game of the Serie A season against Como.

==== Loan to Carrarese ====
On 27 August 2026, Topalović joined Serie B side Carrarese on a season-long loan with an option to buy.

== International career ==
Due to his origins, Topalović is eligible to represent Slovenia, Croatia and Bosnia and Herzegovina internationally.

He has represented Slovenia from under-16 to under-21 level.

== Personal life ==
Topalović was born in Slovenj Gradec, Slovenia to Bosnian Croat parents, originally from Kotor Varoš.

== Career statistics ==
As of match played 23 May 2026

Appearances and goals by club, season and competition
Club	Season	League			National cup (Note: Includes Slovenian Cup)		Europe		Other		Total	
Club	Season	Division	Apps	Goals	Apps	Goals	Apps	Goals	Apps	Goals	Apps	Goals
Domžale	2021–22	Slovenian PrvaLiga	2	0	0	0	0	0	—		2	0
Domžale	2022–23	Slovenian PrvaLiga	10	1	1	0	0	0	—		11	1
Domžale	2023–24	Slovenian PrvaLiga	35	2	1	0	2 (Note: Appearances in UEFA Europa Conference League)	0	—		38	2
Domžale	Total		47	3	2	0	2	0	0	0	51	3
Inter Milan	2024–25	Serie A	1	0	0	0	0	0	0	0	1	0
Inter Milan	2025–26	Serie A	1	0	0	0	0	0	0	0	1	0
Inter Milan	Total		2	0	0	0	0	0	0	0	2	0
Inter Milan U23	2025–26	Serie C	34	4	—		—		3 (Note: Appearances in Coppa Italia Serie C)	0	37	4
Career total			83	7	2	0	2	0	3	0	90	7
