= Luca Ferri (footballer, born 1991) =

Italian footballer

Personal information
- Date of birth: 7 February 1991 (age 35)
- Place of birth: Calcinate, Italy
- Height: 1.82 m (6 ft 0 in)
- Position: Centre-back

Team information
- Current team: Piacenza
- Number: 6

Youth career
- –2011: AlbinoLeffe

Senior career*
Years	Team	Apps	(Gls)
2010–2013	AlbinoLeffe	0	(0)
2010–2011	→ Prato (loan)	21	(0)
2011–2013	→ Cuneo (loan)	31	(0)
2013–2014	Pergolettese	23	(0)
2014–2016	Pro Sesto	62	(0)
2016–2018	Caravaggio	55	(6)
2018–2019	Arzignano Valchiampo	23	(1)
2019–2020	Franciacorta	19	(4)
2020–2022	Fiorenzuola	66	(5)
2022–2024	Trento	60	(1)
2024–2026	Giana Erminio	54	(4)
2026–	Piacenza	0	(0)
- * Club domestic league appearances and goals as of 30 April 2026

Luca Ferri (born 7 February 1991) is an Italian professional footballer who plays as a centre-back for Serie D club Piacenza.

== Club career ==
On 15 July 2020, Ferri joined to Serie D club Fiorenzuola. He played 31 games and scored 2 goals on 2020–21 Serie D season, Fiorenzuola won the Group D and was promoted to Serie C.

On 17 June 2022, Ferri signed a two-year deal with Trento.
