= Matteo Lavelli =

Italian footballer (born 2006)

Personal information
- Date of birth: 8 December 2006 (age 19)
- Place of birth: Vimercate, Italy
- Height: 1.88 m (6 ft 2 in)
- Position: Striker

Team information
- Current team: Inter Milan
- Number: 53

Youth career
- 2012–2015: Vibe Ronchese
- 2015–2015: Monza
- 2016–2018: Renate
- 2018–2025: Inter Milan

Senior career*
Years	Team	Apps	(Gls)
2025–	Inter Milan Under-23	30	(0)
2026–	Inter Milan	2	(0)

International career^{‡}
2024	Italy U19	2	(0)
2025–	Italy U20	2	(0)
2026–	Italy U21	1	(0)
- * Club domestic league appearances and goals as of 30 April 2026 ‡ National team caps and goals as of 22:55, 8 June 2026 (UTC)

Matteo "Pocho" Lavelli (born 8 December 2006) is an Italian professional footballer who plays as a striker for Serie A club Inter Milan.

== Club career ==
Lavelli is a product of the youth academies of the Italian clubs Vibe Ronchese, Monza, Renate and Inter Milan. On 5 July 2024, he signed his first professional contract with Inter until 2027. In April 2025 he extended his contract with Inter, and was promoted to the Inter Milan Under-23 in Serie C. On 4 January 2026, he debuted with the senior Inter Milan team as a substitute in a 3–1 Serie A win over Bologna.

== International career ==
Lavelli is a youth international for Italy. He was called up to the Italy U20s for a set of friendlies in November 2025.

== Personal life ==
Lavelli's father Diego Lavelli played in Serie C in the late 80s and early 90s. His nickname "Pocho" comes from the nickname for the Argentine footballer Ezequiel Lavezzi.
