= Daniele Mignanelli =

Italian footballer (born 1993)

Personal information
- Date of birth: 10 May 1993 (age 33)
- Place of birth: Cantù, Italy
- Height: 1.79 m (5 ft 10 in)
- Position: Defender

Team information
- Current team: Dolomiti
- Number: 19

Senior career*
Years	Team	Apps	(Gls)
2012–2013	Lecco	31	(0)
2013–2014	Pro Patria	25	(0)
2014–2015	Reggiana	38	(2)
2015–2016	Pescara	0	(0)
2015–2016	→ Reggiana (loan)	14	(1)
2016–2019	Ascoli	49	(1)
2019	Viterbese	19	(2)
2019–2020	Carrarese	21	(0)
2020–2021	Modena	26	(0)
2021–2022	Avellino	26	(0)
2022–2024	Juve Stabia	61	(6)
2024–2025	SPAL	31	(2)
2025–	Dolomiti	34	(4)
- * Club domestic league appearances and goals as of 30 April 2026

Daniele Mignanelli (born 10 May 1993) is an Italian professional footballer who plays as a defender for Serie C club Dolomiti.

== Club career ==
On 15 January 2019, he signed with Viterbese.

On 7 August 2019, he signed with Carrarese.

On 30 July 2020, he joined Modena.

On 16 July 2021 he signed a two-year contract with Avellino.

On 10 August 2022, Mignanelli moved to Juve Stabia on a two-year contract.

On 30 August 2024, Mignanelli joined SPAL on a two-year deal.
