= Manuele Malotti =

Italian footballer

Personal information
- Date of birth: 24 April 1997 (age 29)
- Place of birth: Florence, Italy
- Height: 1.86 m (6 ft 1 in)
- Position: Winger

Team information
- Current team: Livorno
- Number: 21

Youth career
- Prato

Senior career*
Years	Team	Apps	(Gls)
2015–2017	Prato	21	(0)
2017–2018	Gavorrano	29	(0)
2018	Porta Romana		
2018–2019	Tuttocuoio	20	(4)
2019–2020	Aglianese	25	(4)
2020–2021	Sambenedettese	10	(0)
2021	→ Novara (loan)	20	(2)
2021	Novara	0	(0)
2021–2022	Teramo	33	(3)
2022–2023	Renate	27	(7)
2023–2026	Lumezzane	81	(9)
2026–	Livorno	1	(0)
- * Club domestic league appearances and goals as of 24 August 2026

Manuele Malotti (born 24 April 1997) is an Italian professional footballer who plays as a winger for Serie C Group B club Livorno.

== Career ==
On 19 September 2020, he joined Serie C club Sambenedettese.

On 12 August 2021, he signed with Teramo in Serie C.

On 11 August 2022, Malotti moved to Renate on a two-year deal.
