= Davide Mondonico =

Italian footballer (born 1997)

Personal information
- Date of birth: 25 May 1997 (age 29)
- Place of birth: Vimercate, Italy
- Height: 1.93 m (6 ft 4 in)
- Position: Centre-back

Team information
- Current team: Dolomiti Bellunesi
- Number: 23

Youth career
- 2006–2016: Milan

Senior career*
Years	Team	Apps	(Gls)
2016–2021	AlbinoLeffe	103	(6)
2021–2023	Crotone	6	(0)
2022–2023	→ Ancona (loan)	26	(0)
2023–2024	Renate	9	(1)
2024	Ancona	16	(0)
2024–2025	Campobasso	19	(1)
2025–	Dolomiti Bellunesi	29	(1)
- * Club domestic league appearances and goals as of 30 April 2026

Davide Mondonico (born 25 May 1997) is an Italian professional footballer who plays as a defender for Dolomiti Bellunesi.

== Career ==
=== Early career ===
Davide Mondonico spent much of his youth career in AC Milan's youth system, approximately a decade between 2006 and 2016. Despite never signing a pro contract with Milan, Mondonico made his lone appearance for the club in a friendly match in September 2015.

=== AlbinoLeffe ===
In 2016, Mondonico joined Serie C club AlbinoLeffe. He made his league debut for the club on 22 October 2016, coming on as an 85th-minute substitute for Carmine Giorgione in a 3-1 victory over Teramo.

=== Crotone ===
On 11 June 2021, he signed a 3-year contract with Crotone. On 30 July 2022, Mondonico was loaned to Ancona, with an option to buy.

=== Campobasso ===
On 2 July 2024, Mondonico moved to Campobasso on a two-year contract.
