= Thomas Berenbruch =

Italian footballer (born 2005)

Personal information
- Date of birth: 31 May 2005 (age 21)
- Place of birth: Milan, Italy
- Height: 1.75 m (5 ft 9 in)
- Position: Midfielder

Team information
- Current team: Avellino (on loan from Inter Milan)
- Number: 18

Youth career
- –2020: Renate
- 2020–2025: Inter Milan

Senior career*
Years	Team	Apps	(Gls)
2025–	Inter Milan	0	(0)
2025–2026	→ Inter Milan U23 (res.)	27	(1)
2026–	→ Avellino (loan)	0	(0)

International career^{‡}
2021	Italy U17	2	(0)
2023	Italy U19	2	(0)
2024–	Italy U20	1	(0)
- * Club domestic league appearances and goals as of 30 April 2026 ‡ National team caps and goals as of 30 October 2024

Thomas Berenbruch (born 31 May 2005) is an Italian professional footballer who plays as a midfielder for Serie B club Avellino, on loan from Inter Milan.

== Life and career ==
Berenbruch was born on 31 May 2005 in Milan, Italy, and is of German descent through his paternal grandfather. Primarily a central midfielder, he is also capable of playing in an advanced role. A left-footed player, Berenbruch is known for his impressive dribbling skills and goal-scoring ability. As a youth player, he joined the youth academy of Italian side Renate.

In 2020, Berenbruch joined the youth academy of Serie A side Inter Milan, where he played in the UEFA Youth League and began his senior career with the club. He is a current Italy youth international and has played for the Italy national under-17 football team, the Italy national under-19 football team, and the Italy national under-20 football team, making two appearances for the Italy national under-17 football team.

Berenbruch made his UEFA Champions League debut against Feyenoord, coming on in the 84th minute of a 2–1 second leg victory at the San Siro, replacing Davide Frattesi.

On 17 August 2027, Berenbruch joined Serie B club Avellino on a season-long loan.
