= Inter Milan Under-23 =

Reserve team of Inter Milan

- Full name: Football Club Internazionale Milano U23
- Short name: Inter Milan U23; Inter U23
- Founded: 24 July 2025; 15 months ago
- Ground: Stadio Ernesto Breda, Sesto San Giovanni, Italy
- Capacity: 3,523
- Owners: Oaktree Capital Management (99.6%); Other shareholders (0.04%)
- President: Giuseppe Marotta
- Head coach: Stefano Vecchi
- League: Serie C Group A
- 2025–26: Serie C Group A, 12th of 20
- Website: www.inter.it
Home colours	Away colours	Third colours

Football Club Internazionale Milano Under-23, known as Inter Milan Under-23 or simply Inter U23, is a professional football club based in Milan, Lombardy, Italy, which acts as the reserve team of Serie A club Inter Milan. Founded on 24 July 2025, the club competes in Serie C Group A and the Coppa Italia Serie C.

== History ==
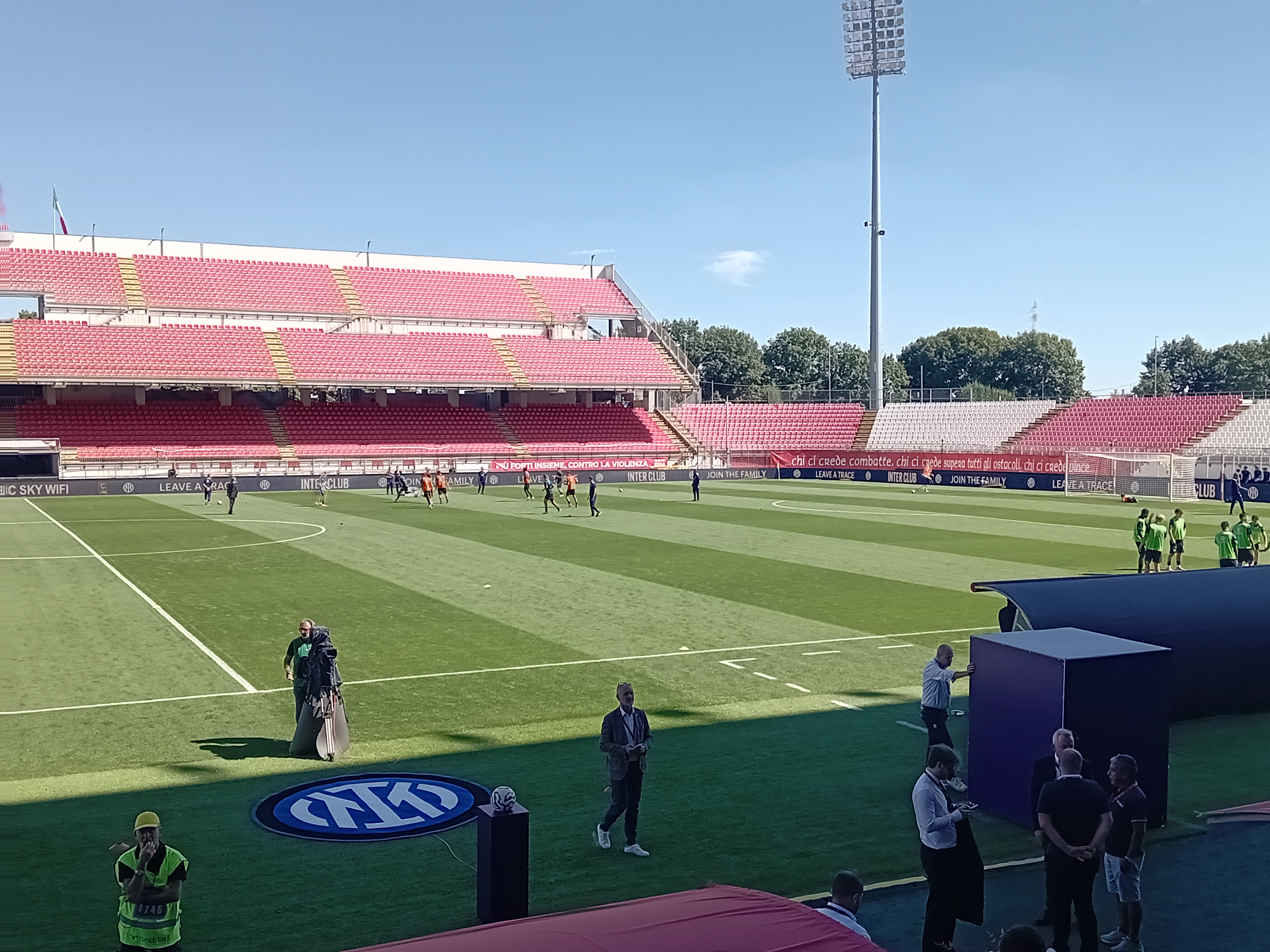
Before a match in Monza

In February 2025, Inter Milan president Giuseppe Marotta announced the club's plans to launch a reserve team beginning with the 2025–26 season. The club, the fourth reserve team introduced in Italian football after Juventus Next Gen, Atalanta Under-23, and Milan Futuro, was formally admitted to Serie C on 24 July 2025, replacing the excluded SPAL. Stefano Vecchi was appointed as the inaugural head coach. The team trains at the Centro Sportivo Giacinto Facchetti, also known as Interello, which offers 30,000 square meters of professional training and education facilities between the Affori and Niguarda neighborhoods in northern Milan.

== Stadium ==
The club plays its home matches at the Stadio Ernesto Breda in the city of Sesto San Giovanni, about 9 kilometres (6 miles) north-northeast of Milan.

== Squad ==
As of 2 November 2026

Note: Flags indicate national team as defined under FIFA eligibility rules; some limited exceptions apply. Players may hold more than one non-FIFA nationality.

No.	Pos.	Nation	Player
1	GK	ITA	Riccardo Melgrati
2	DF	ITA	Tommaso Avitabile
3	DF	ITA	Mattia Marello
4	MF	ITA	Filippo Cerpelletti
5	DF	ITA	Lorenzo Tosto (on loan from Empoli)
6	MF	BRA	Charlys (on loan from Hellas Verona)
7	MF	POL	Iwo Kaczmarski
8	MF	ITA	Luca Fiordilino
9	FW	ITA	Jamal Iddrissou
10	FW	ITA	Richi Agbonifo
11	FW	POL	Jan Żuberek
14	MF	ITA	Leonardo Bovo
15	DF	ITA	Francesco Stante
16	MF	ITA	Matteo Venturini
19	DF	ITA	Giuseppe Prestia (captain)

No.	Pos.	Nation	Player
22	GK	ALB	Alain Taho
24	DF	ITA	Gabriele Re Cecconi
27	DF	ITA	Mike Aidoo
29	MF	ITA	Matias Mancuso
30	FW	ITA	Mattia Mosconi
45	FW	ITA	Matteo Lavelli
71	GK	ITA	Alessandro Calligaris
75	DF	ITA	Leonardo Bovio
77	DF	ITA	Igor Amerighi
78	DF	VEN	Alessandro Milani
80	DF	ITA	Gabriele Garonetti
86	DF	CRO	Leon Jakirović
95	GK	ITA	Paolo Raimondi
99	FW	ITA	Tommaso Fumagalli

=== Inter Primavera ===
Inter Primavera players that received an official call-up to the Under-23 squad.

Note: Flags indicate national team as defined under FIFA eligibility rules; some limited exceptions apply. Players may hold more than one non-FIFA nationality.

No.	Pos.	Nation	Player
20	FW	ITA	Thomas Matarrese
21	DF	ITA	Edoardo Rocca
23	DF	ITA	Andrea Donato
28	FW	MAR	Anas El Mahboubi
32	FW	ITA	Mirko Franchi

No.	Pos.	Nation	Player
37	DF	ITA	Davide Sorino
38	MF	ITA	Giovanni D'Agostino
40	GK	ITA	Carlo Galliera
91	FW	ITA	Cristian Carrara

=== Out on loan ===
Note: Flags indicate national team as defined under FIFA eligibility rules; some limited exceptions apply. Players may hold more than one non-FIFA nationality.

No.	Pos.	Nation	Player
—	GK	LAT	Roberts Apsits (at Campobasso until 30 June 2027)
—	GK	ITA	Matteo Zamarian (at Pro Sesto until 30 June 2027)
—	DF	GRE	Christos Alexiou (at AEK Athens until 30 June 2027)
—	DF	ITA	Lamine Ballo (at AlbinoLeffe until 30 June 2027)
—	DF	ITA	Matteo Cocchi (at Padova until 30 June 2027)
—	DF	FRA	Yvan Maye (at Monza until 30 June 2027)
—	DF	ITA	Giacomo Stabile (at Südtirol until 30 June 2027)

No.	Pos.	Nation	Player
—	MF	ITA	Thomas Berenbruch (at Avellino until 30 June 2027)
—	MF	SLO	Luka Topalović (at Carrarese until 30 June 2027)
—	MF	ITA	Mattia Zanchetta (at Giana Erminio until 30 June 2027)
—	MF	ESP	Dilan Zárate (at Cádiz until 30 June 2027)
—	FW	ITA	Giacomo De Pieri (at Ascoli until 30 June 2027)
—	FW	ITA	Manuel Pinotti (at Audace Cerignola until 30 June 2027)
—	FW	ITA	Matteo Spinaccè (at Mantova until 30 June 2027)

== Coaching staff ==
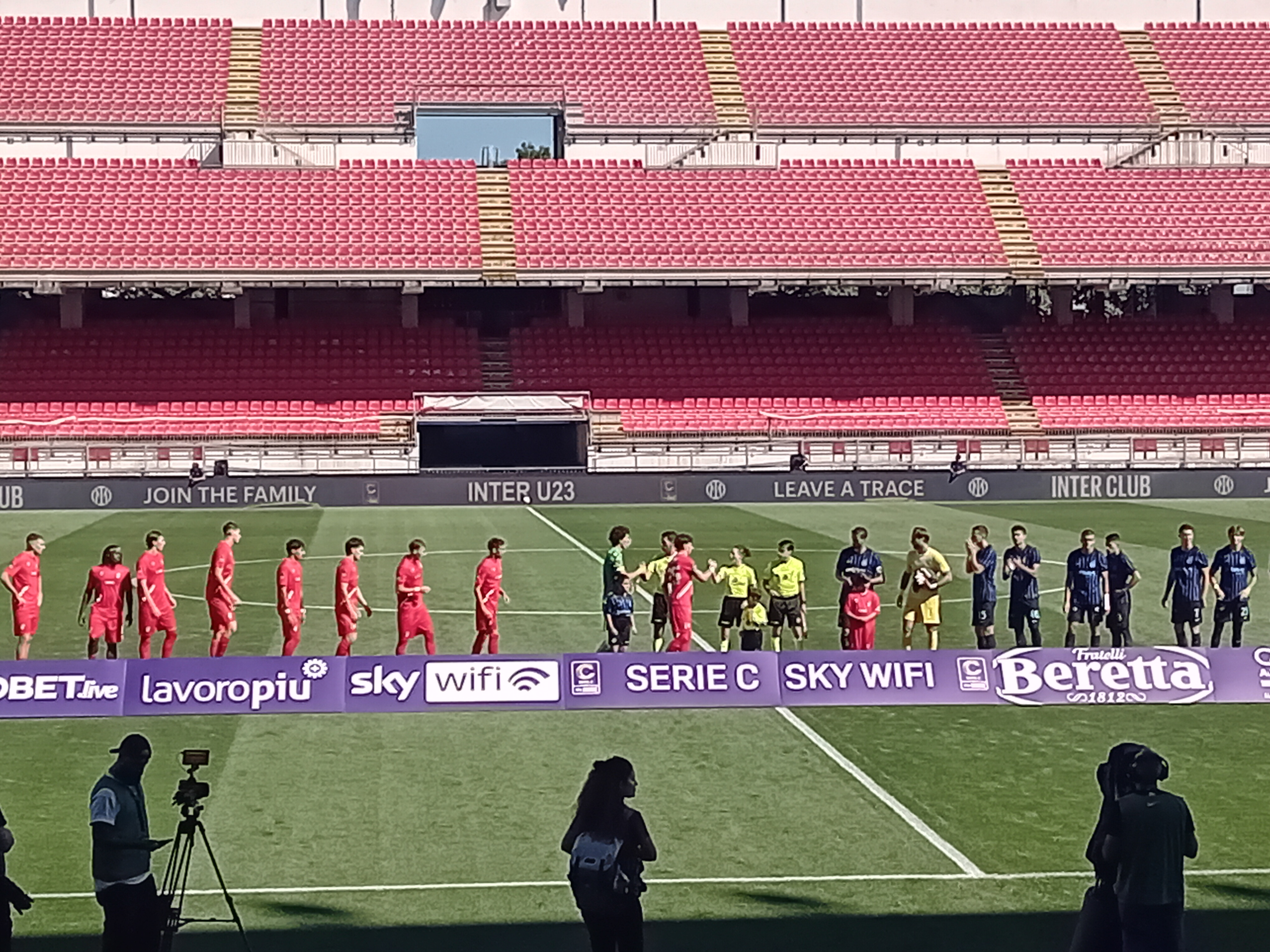
Inter U23 Vs Pro Patria in 2025

As of 17 July 2026

Position	Staff
Head coach	(Italy) Stefano Vecchi
Assistant coach	(Italy) Omar Danesi
Technical coaches	(Italy) Massimiliano Sigolo (Italy) Matia Costigliolo
Fitness coaches	(Italy) Mario Familari (Italy) Paolo Bezzi
Goalkeeping coach	(Italy) Paolo Castelli
Match analysts	(Italy) Giacomo Toninato (Italy) Marcello Mancini

== See also ==
- Inter Milan Youth Sector
- Italian reserve football teams
