= Inter Milan Youth Sector =

- Full name: Football Club Internazionale Milano Youth Sector
- Nicknames: I Nerazzurri (The Black and Blues); La Beneamata (The Cherished One); Il Biscione (The Big Grass Snake)
- Founded: 9 March 1908; 118 years ago
- Ground: Konami Youth Development Centre in Memory of Giacinto Facchetti [Milan]
- President: Giuseppe Marotta
- Head coach: Emiliano Bigica (Primavera)
- League: Campionato Primavera 1
- 2024–25: Campionato Primavera 1, champions (2nd in regular season)
Home colours	Away colours

Inter Milan Youth Sector (Italian: Inter Milano Settore Giovanile) is the youth set-up of Italian professional football club Inter Milan. The under-20 team plays in the Campionato Primavera 1. They have been Italian champions eleven times, Coppa Italia Primavera winners six times, and have also won the Supercoppa Primavera on two occasions. They also participate in the annual Torneo di Viareggio, an international tournament which they have won eight times.

On 25 March 2012, the under-19 team were champions in the inaugural edition of the NextGen Series, an association football tournament which involved the under-19 teams from 16 different clubs from across Europe.

== Primavera ==
=== Current squad ===
As of 11 August 2026

Note: Flags indicate national team as defined under FIFA eligibility rules; some limited exceptions apply. Players may hold more than one non-FIFA nationality.

No.	Pos.	Nation	Player
1	GK	ALB	Alain Taho
2	DF	ITA	Tommaso Della Mora
4	MF	ITA	Filippo Cerpelletti
5	MF	ESP	Hugo Humanes
6	DF	FRA	Yvan Maye
8	MF	COL	Dilan Zárate
9	FW	ITA	Jamal Iddrissou
10	FW	ITA	Manuel Pinotti
11	FW	ARG	Thiago Romano
12	GK	ITA	Alessandro Pentima
13	MF	CRO	Dominik Kartelo
14	DF	ITA	Arturo Conti
15	DF	ITA	Leonardo Bovio
16	MF	ITA	Matteo Venturini
17	FW	ITA	Kevin Moressa
18	MF	SWE	Dino Putsén
19	FW	MAR	Anas El Mahboubi
21	GK	ITA	Matteo Farronato

No.	Pos.	Nation	Player
22	DF	ITA	Lamine Ballo
23	MF	ITA	Pietro La Torre
25	FW	LAT	Roberts Kukulis
26	DF	ITA	Gabriele Garonetti
27	DF	ITA	Alessandro Nenna
28	MF	ITA	Marco Virtuani
29	MF	ITA	Matias Mancuso
30	FW	ITA	Mattia Mosconi
31	DF	ITA	Davide Sorino
32	GK	LTU	Henrikas Adomavičius
33	MF	MNE	Andrija Vukoje
34	DF	POL	Patryk Mackiewicz
35	DF	ITA	Cristian Breda
36	FW	NOR	Jonas Dahlberg Strand
37	FW	ITA	Matteo Lavelli
38	DF	SUI	Joachim Williamson (on loan from Grasshopper)
39	MF	ITA	Mattia Zanchetta
41	FW	ALB	Delis Gjeci
43	DF	ITA	Tommaso Avitabile
44	MF	ITA	Thomas Berenbruch

=== Out on loan ===
Note: Flags indicate national team as defined under FIFA eligibility rules; some limited exceptions apply. Players may hold more than one non-FIFA nationality.

No.	Pos.	Nation	Player

=== Managerial history ===
- unknown (1962–2001)
- (Italy) Corrado Verdelli (2001–2003)
- (Italy) Daniele Bernazzani (2003–2006)
- (Italy) Vincenzo Esposito (2006–2009)
- (Italy) Fulvio Pea (2009–2011)
- (Italy) Andrea Stramaccioni (2011–2012)
- (Italy) Daniele Bernazzani (2012–2013)
- (Italy) Salvatore Cerrone (2013–2014)
- (Italy) Stefano Vecchi (2014–2018)
- (Italy) Armando Madonna (2018–2021)
- (Romania) Cristian Chivu (2021–2024)
- (Italy) Andrea Zanchetta (2024–2025)
- (Italy) Benito Carbone (2025–2026)
- (Italy) Emiliano Bigica (2026–current)

=== Honours ===
- Campionato Nazionale Primavera / Campionato Primavera 1
  - Champions (11): 1963–64, 1965–66, 1968–69, 1988–89, 2001–02, 2006–07, 2011–12, 2016–17, 2017–18, 2021–22, 2024–25
  - Runners-up (5): 1979–80, 2002–03, 2003–04, 2007–08, 2018–19
- Coppa Italia Primavera
  - Champions (6): 1972–73, 1975–76, 1976–77, 1977–78, 2005–06, 2015–16
  - Runners-up (3): 1978–79, 2003–04, 2006–07
- Supercoppa Primavera
  - Champions (2): 2017, 2025
  - Runners-up (6): 2006, 2007, 2012, 2016, 2018, 2022
- Torneo di Viareggio
  - Champions (8): 1962, 1971, 1986, 2002, 2008, 2011, 2015, 2018
  - Runners-up (2): 1972, 1983
- Blue Stars/FIFA Youth Cup
  - Champions (1): 1983
- Champions Under-18 Challenge
  - Champions (1): 2010
- NextGen Series
  - Champions (1): 2011–12

== Youth system ==
The home of Inter's Youth Sector is at Centro Sportivo Giacinto Facchetti, also known as Interello, 30,000 square metres of professional training and education facilities between the Affori and Niguarda neighborhoods in northern Milan.

Inter Youth Sector has 20 scouts in the Lombardy region and 10 in the rest of Italy. They all report directly to the general coordinator in Milan.

Below the Primavera team (U19), there are nine other teams:

- Berretti (U18)
- Allievi Nazionali (U17)
- Allievi Nazionali Lega Pro (U16)
- Giovanissimi Nazionali (U15)
- Giovanissimi Regionali (U14)
- Giovanissimi Regionali Fascia B (U13)
- Esordienti (U12)
- Pulcini Regionali (U11)
- Pulcini B (U10)
- Pulcini C (U9)

=== Honours ===
- Campionato Berretti: 6
  - 1979–80, 1983–84, 1990–91, 2011–12, 2015–16, 2016–17
- Campionato Allievi Nazionali: 8
  - 1984–85, 1986–87, 1990–91, 1997–98, 2007–08, 2013–14, 2016–17, 2018–19
- Campionato Allievi Nazionali Lega Pro: 1
  - 2017–18
- Campionato Giovanissimi Nazionali (Campionato Nazionale Under-15): 11
  - 1987–88, 1996–97, 2002–03, 2005–06, 2008–09, 2011–12, 2012–13, 2014–15, 2017–18, 2022–23, 2024–25
- Campionato Giovanissimi Regionali: 7
  - 2009–10, 2010–11, 2011–12, 2014–15, 2015–16, 2017–18, 2021–22
- Campionato Giovanissimi Regionali Fascia B: 1
  - 2017–18
- Supercoppa Under-17: 3
  - 2014, 2017, 2019
- Supercoppa Under-15: 1
  - 2018
