= 2025–26 Super League Greece 2 Super Cup =

Kalamata	Iraklis
1	0
- Date: 28 March 2026
- Venue: Athens Olympic Stadium, Athens
- Referee: Eleni Antoniou (Achaea)
- Attendance: 12,000
- Weather: Fair; 10 °C (50 °F); 79% humidity

The 2025–26 Super League Greece 2 Super Cup was the second and final edition of the Super League Greece 2 Super Cup, a football match between the champions of the North and South group of the 2025–26 Super League Greece 2 season. The match was held on 28 March 2026 at the Athens Olympic Stadium.

The contesting teams were the SL2 North Group champions Iraklis and the SL2 South Group champions, Kalamata, with Kalamata being the winners of the Super Cup by winning 1-0.

== Match ==
=== Details ===
28 March 2026
18:30 EET

Kalamata	1-0	Iraklis
Tselios 50'	Report

Athens Olympic Stadium, Athens
Referee: Eleni Antoniou (Achaea)

Kalamata	Iraklis

GK	13	(Greece) Ioannis Gelios	(yellow card) 94'
RB	2	(Greece) Nikos Vafeas
CB	22	(Greece) Petros Kaloutsikidis
CB	4	(Greece) Stefanos Stroungis
DF	33	(Uruguay) Maximiliano Moreira	(substituted off) 85'
LB	7	(Argentina) Juan Cataldi	(substituted off) 69'
DM	23	(Greece) Angelos Ikonomou	(substituted off) 85'
RW	14	(Greece) Georgios Pamlidis (c)	(substituted off) 74'
LW	20	(Guinea) Ahmad Mendes Moreira	(yellow card) 83'
FW	38	(Greece) Ilias Tselios	(yellow card) 91'
CF	9	(Greece) Vasilios Mantzis	(substituted off) 74'	(yellow card) 2'
Substitutes:
GK	31	(Greece) Manolis Kalogerakis
DF	5	(Greece) Timotheos Tselepidis	(substituted on) 85'
DF	33	(Greece) Odysseas Lymperakis
DF	32	(Greece) Stathis Tachatos	(substituted on) 85'
MF	29	(Argentina) Nicolás Czornomaz	(substituted on) 69'
MF	12	(Argentina) Julián Bonetto	(substituted on) 74'
FW	97	(Greece) Konstantinos Kotsopoulos	(substituted on) 74'
MF	28	(Argentina) Federico Jourdan
MF	16	(Portugal) Bruno Gama
Manager:
(Greece) Alekos Vosniadis

GK	91	(Greece) Dimitrios Stournaras
RB	2	(Greece) Stefanos Katsikas
CB	3	(Greece) Vasilios Vitlis	(yellow card) 63'	(substituted off) 79'
CB	23	(Argentina) Rodrigo Erramuspe (c)	(yellow card) 81'
LB	44	(Morocco) Sofian Chakla
DM	21	(Austria) Marco Krainz	(substituted off) 57'
DM	80	(Ivory Coast) Hamed Kader Fofana	(substituted off) 58'	(yellow card) 40'
RW	8	(Egypt) Amr Warda
LW	10	(Serbia) Miloš Deletić
AM	33	(Greece) Panagiotis Tzimas	(substituted off) 78'
CF	14	(Greece) Giorgos Manalis
Substitutes:
GK	43	(Greece) Giannis Nikopolidis
DF	3	(Greece) Konstantinos Dimitriou
DF	4	(Ghana) Stephen Hammond	(substituted on) 57'
MF	5	(Greece) Orestis Tsintonis	(substituted on) 58'	(yellow card) 67'
FW	11	(Greece) Fiorin Durmishaj	(substituted on) 78'
DF	12	(Greece) Antonis Anastasiou	(substituted on) 79'
DF	19	(Syria) Abdul Rahman Weiss
FW	37	(Austria) Nikola Dovedan
DF	94	(Greece) Georgios Giannoutsos
Manager:
(Greece) Giorgos Petrakis

Man of the Match:

Assistant referees:
Vasilia Tsiklitari (Pieria)
Zoi Papadopoulou (Macedonia)
Fourth official:
Anastasia Mylopoulou (Kavala)

Match rules

- 90 minutes
- Penalty shoot-out if scores still level after 90'
- Nine named substitutes, of which up to five may be used at maximum three times, with a sixth allowed in extra time.
