= 2024–25 Inter Milan season =

Inter Milan
2024–25 season
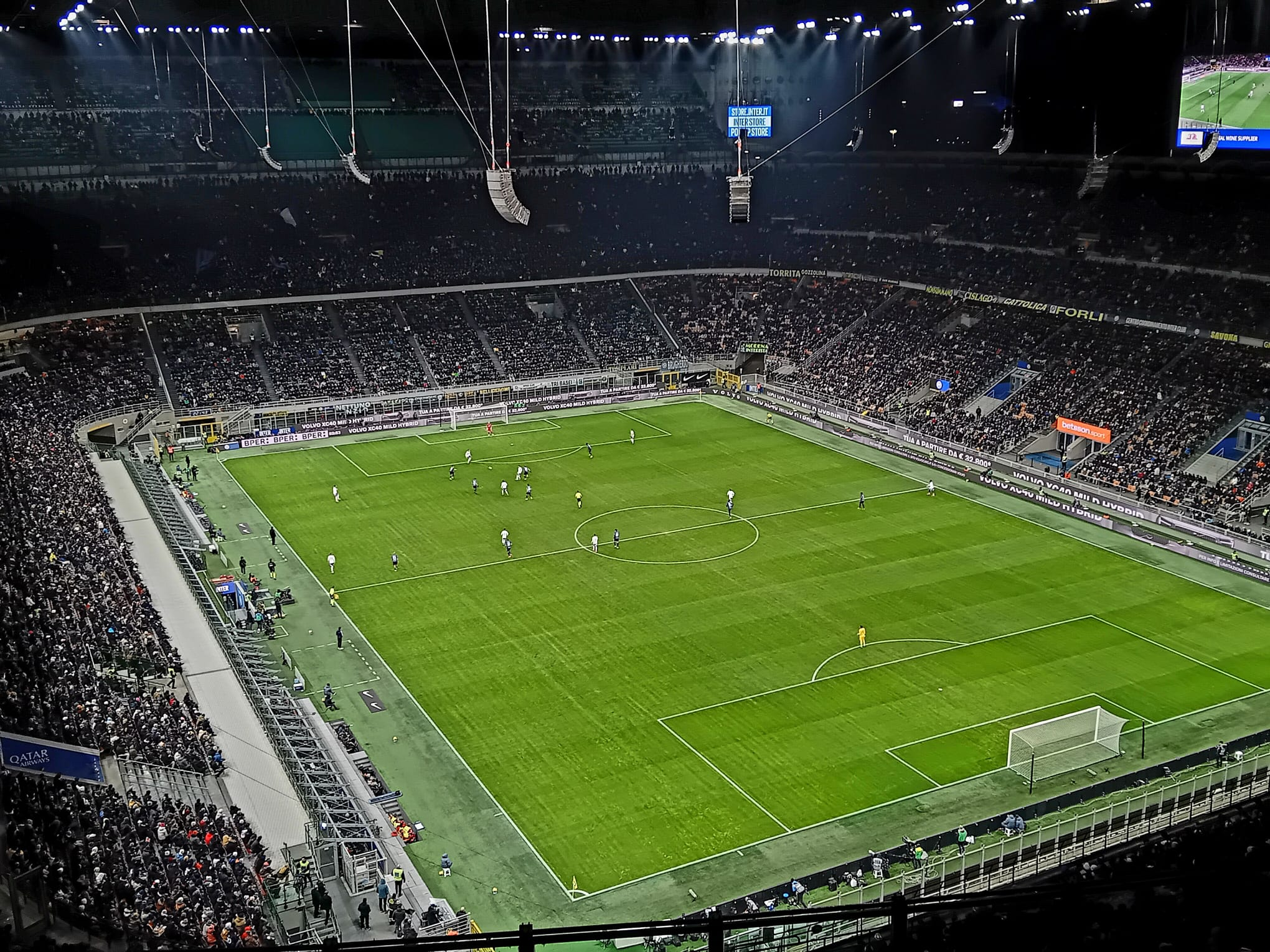
- The San Siro during Inter's match against Como, 23 December 2024
- Chairman: Giuseppe Marotta
- Head coach: Simone Inzaghi (until 3 June); Cristian Chivu (from 9 June)
- Stadium: San Siro
- Serie A: 2nd
- Coppa Italia: Semi-finals
- Supercoppa Italiana: Runners-up
- UEFA Champions League: Runners-up
- FIFA Club World Cup: Round of 16
- Top goalscorer: League: Marcus Thuram (14); All: Lautaro Martínez (24)
- Highest home attendance: 75,625 v Bayern Munich; 18 May 2025 (Champions League)
- Lowest home attendance: 53,333 v Lazio; 25 February 2025 (Coppa Italia)
- Average home league attendance: 70,129
- Biggest win: 6–0 v Lazio; 16 December 2024 (Serie A)
- Biggest defeat: 0–5 v Paris Saint-Germain; 31 May 2025 (Champions League)
Home colours	Away colours	Third colours

The 2024–25 season was the 117th season in the existence of Inter Milan, which have all been played in the top division of Italian football. In addition to the domestic league, Inter participated in this season's editions of the Coppa Italia, the Supercoppa Italiana, the UEFA Champions League and the new, expanded format of the FIFA Club World Cup.

== Kits ==
Supplier: Nike / Front sponsor: Betsson.sport / Back sponsor: U-Power / Sleeve sponsor: GATE.io

Outfield players kits

Home	Home; 2025–26 (Note: Used during the 2025 FIFA Club World Cup.)	Away	Away; VR46 Special (Note: Valentino Rossi special edition away kit, used on matchday 32 against Cagliari.)	Away alternative	Away; 2025–26	Third	Third alternative

Goalkeeper kits

Goalkeeper 1	Goalkeeper 2	Goalkeeper 3	Goalkeeper 4	Goalkeeper 1; 2025–26	Goalkeeper 2; 2025–26

== Season summary ==
=== Pre-season ===
Following their historic 20th scudetto victory, on 22 May 2024, Suning relinquished control of its majority stake in Inter Milan after failing to repay €395 million owed to Oaktree Capital Management. As a result, the American firm took 99.6% control of the club. On 4 June, Inter's shareholders approved a new board of directors, with CEO Giuseppe Marotta appointed as the club's president.

On 11 June, the club announced that vice-captain Nicolò Barella had extended his contract until 2029. On 1 July, Inter bid farewell to Juan Cuadrado, Davy Klaassen, Alexis Sánchez, and Stefano Sensi as their contracts expired. Emil Audero also returned to Sampdoria after his loan spell with the Nerazzurri ended.

On 6 July, Inter confirmed the signing of Polish midfielder Piotr Zieliński on a free transfer from Napoli. Three days later, on 9 July, Spanish goalkeeper Josep Martínez was acquired from Genoa for €13.2 million, plus bonuses. On 12 July, head coach Simone Inzaghi extended his contract with the club until 2026.

The following day, Inter officially announced the free transfer of Iranian striker Mehdi Taremi from Porto. On 7 August, talented attacking midfielder Valentín Carboni joined Marseille on a season-long loan, with a reported option to buy for €36 million and a €40 million counter-option in favour of Inter. On 12 August, captain Lautaro Martínez renewed his contract with the club until 2029.

=== August ===
Inter began their league campaign on 17 August 2024 with a 2–2 away draw against Genoa, with striker Marcus Thuram scoring both goals for the Nerazzurri. On 24 August, Inter secured their first win of the season, defeating Lecce 2–0 with goals from Matteo Darmian and Hakan Çalhanoğlu. On 30 August, Argentine centre-back Tomás Palacios became the last signing of the summer transfer window, joining for €6.5 million plus €4.5 million in bonuses, shared equally between Talleres and Independiente Rivadavia. On the same day, an own goal from Berat Djimsiti, a volley from Barella, and a brace from Thuram helped Inter secure a 4–0 victory over Atalanta before the international break.

=== September ===
On 15 September, a heavily rotated Inter squad struggled against Monza, with Denzel Dumfries scoring a late equaliser to salvage a 1–1 draw. The following day, Inter confirmed that Albanian playmaker Kristjan Asllani had extended his contract with the club until 2028. On 18 September, Inter made their Champions League debut for the season with a goalless draw away at Manchester City, a rematch of the 2023 final.

On 22 September, Inter suffered their first defeat of the season, losing 1–2 to AC Milan in the Derby della Madonnina, ending a six-game winning streak against their city rivals. Federico Dimarco initially equalised after Christian Pulisic's opening goal, but Matteo Gabbia's 89th-minute header secured the win for the Rossoneri. Six days later, Inter earned their only win in September, defeating Udinese 3–2 thanks to a goal from Davide Frattesi, who scored just 43 seconds into the match, and a brace from Lautaro Martínez that ended his goal drought with the club.

=== October ===
On 1 October, Inter defeated Red Star Belgrade 4–0 on matchday 2 of the Champions League. After Çalhanoğlu opened the scoring with a free-kick, Mehdi Taremi assisted Marko Arnautović and Lautaro Martínez, before scoring his debut goal for the club from the penalty spot. On 5 October, a hat-trick from Thuram helped Inter secure a 3–2 home victory over 10-man Torino.

After the second international break, on 20 October, Inter secured a 1–0 victory against Roma at the Stadio Olimpico, with Lautaro scoring the only goal of the match. Three days later, in the Champions League, the Nerazzurri struggled away at Swiss side Young Boys but earned a 1–0 victory thanks to a last-minute goal from Thuram.

On 27 October, Inter faced Juventus in a thrilling 4–4 draw. Zieliński scored twice from the penalty spot, while Mkhitaryan and Dumfries also found the net for the Nerazzurri. Three days later, in the final match of the month, Inter beat Empoli 3–0, courtesy of a brace from Frattesi and a goal from Lautaro Martínez. This marked Martínez's 134th goal for the club, making him Inter's all-time top foreign scorer, surpassing István Nyers.

=== November ===
On 3 November, Inter defeated Venezia 1–0, with Lautaro scoring his first Serie A goal at San Siro since 28 February. Three days later, on matchday 4 of the Champions League, Inter defeated Arsenal 1–0, thanks to a penalty from Çalhanoğlu at the end of the first half. Inter put in a strong defensive performance, as Arsenal attempted 20 shots without scoring.

On 10 November, Inter drew 1–1 with league leaders Napoli, after Çalhanoğlu's powerful strike from outside the box. However, Çalhanoğlu later missed his first penalty since November 2016, ending a streak of 19 successful efforts. On 15 November, German centre-back Yann Aurel Bisseck extended his contract with the club until 2029.

On 23 November, Inter dominated Hellas Verona with a 5–0 victory, with all five goals coming in the first half. Joaquín Correa opened the scoring, followed by a brace from Marcus Thuram, and goals from Stefan de Vrij and Yann Bisseck. On 26 November, Inter defeated RB Leipzig 1–0, with an own goal from Castello Lukeba securing the win. This marked Inter's fifth consecutive clean sheet in the Champions League across their first five matches, a feat only previously achieved by Juventus in 2004–05 and Manchester United in 2010–11. The following day, Dutch wing-back Denzel Dumfries renewed his contract with the Nerazzurri until 2028.

=== December ===
On 1 December, Inter faced Fiorentina, but the match was suspended in the 17th minute after Fiorentina player Edoardo Bove collapsed on the pitch. The remainder of the match was postponed for later completion. Five days later, Inter triumphed 3–1 over Parma, with goals from Dimarco, Barella, and Thuram.

On 11 December, Inter suffered their second loss of the season, falling 1–0 to Bayer Leverkusen on matchday 6 of the Champions League. On 16 December, Inter returned to winning ways with a dominant 6–0 victory over Lazio, thanks to goals from Çalhanoğlu, Dimarco, Barella, Dumfries, Carlos Augusto, and Thuram.

On 19 December, Inter made their debut in the Coppa Italia, defeating Udinese 2–0 in the round of 16, thanks to goals from Arnautović and Asllani. Four days later, they extended their strong form in the league, beating Como 2–0 with Carlos Augusto and Thuram finding the back of the net. In their final match of 2024, the Nerazzurri triumphed 3–0 away to Cagliari, with goals from Alessandro Bastoni, Lautaro Martínez, and Hakan Çalhanoğlu.

=== January ===
Inter's 2025 began with the heartbreak of losing the Supercoppa Italiana, ending their streak of three consecutive victories in the competition. On 2 January, Inter advanced to the final with a 2–0 win over Atalanta, thanks to a brace from Dumfries. However, four days later, in the final against city rivals AC Milan, Inter squandered a 2–0 lead, courtesy of goals from Lautaro and Taremi, as the Rossoneri mounted a dramatic 3–2 comeback to claim the first trophy of the season.

On 12 January, Inter returned to winning form with a 1–0 victory over Venezia, courtesy of a goal from Darmian. Three days later, they were held to a 2–2 draw against Bologna, with Dumfries and Lautaro getting on the scoresheet for the Nerazzurri.

Inter quickly bounced back with two impressive league victories. On 19 January, they triumphed 3–1 over Empoli, with Lautaro, Dumfries, and Thuram finding the back of net. A week later, on 26 January, they cruised to a 4–0 win against Lecce, thanks to goals from Frattesi, Lautaro, Dumfries, and Taremi.

In the Champions League, on 22 January, Inter secured a 1–0 away win against Czech side Sparta Prague, with Lautaro scoring the only goal of the match. Then, on 29 January, Lautaro netted a hat-trick to give Inter a commanding 3–0 victory over Monaco, ensuring they finished fourth in the league phase and advanced directly to the round of 16.

=== February ===
On 1 February, Inter confirmed the loan acquisition of Polish wing-back Nicola Zalewski from Roma for a reported €600,000 loan fee, with the buy option at €6.5 million. The following day, Zalewski made his debut and provided the assist for Stefan de Vrij's last-minute equaliser in the Derby della Madonnina, which ended in a 1–1 draw. On 6 February, Inter suffered a heavy 0–3 loss against Fiorentina in the rescheduled match originally set for 1 December, missing the opportunity to reach league leaders Napoli. Just four days later, however, Inter exacted their revenge, defeating the Tuscan side 2–1, thanks to an own goal by Marin Pongračić and a headed strike from Marko Arnautović.

On 16 February, Inter suffered their third league defeat of the season, losing 1–0 to rivals Juventus at the Allianz Stadium. This loss prevented them from reclaiming the top spot in the league, following Napoli's draw against Lazio. On 22 February, Inter secured a 1–0 victory over Genoa, with Lautaro Martínez scoring the only goal of the match. Meanwhile, Napoli suffered a 1–2 loss to Como, allowing Inter to climb to the top of the league standings with a one-point lead.

On 25 February, goals from Arnautović and Çalhanoğlu helped Inter secure a 2–0 victory over Lazio in the Coppa Italia quarter-finals, with the Nerazzurri set to face city rivals AC Milan in the two-legged semi-finals.

=== March ===
Inter began March with a 1–1 draw against fellow title contenders Napoli, with Dimarco scoring a free kick for the Nerazzurri. On 5 March, in the first leg of the Champions League round of 16, Inter secured a 2–0 victory over Feyenoord in Rotterdam, thanks to goals from Thuram and Lautaro.

On 8 March, Inter mounted a comeback win against Monza, overcoming a 0–2 deficit to secure a 3–2 victory, with goals from Arnautović, Çalhanoğlu, and an own goal by Giorgos Kyriakopoulos. On 11 March, in the second leg of the Champions League round of 16, Inter triumphed 2–1 over Feyenoord, securing a 4–1 aggregate victory. The match was highlighted by a goal from Thuram and a penalty conversion by Çalhanoğlu.

On 16 March, in the final match before the international break, Inter extended their lead at the top of Serie A with a 2–0 victory over third-place Atalanta, thanks to goals from Carlos Augusto and Lautaro, while Napoli was held to a goalless draw at Venezia.

=== April ===
Inter began the month of April by drawing the first leg of their Coppa Italia semi-final against rivals Milan 1–1.

Inter then suffered a setback in Serie A after drawing 2–2 with Parma despite leading by two goals at half time on the 5th of April 2025. Despite this they kept their 3-point lead as Napoli were held to a 1–1 draw by Bologna.

In the Champions League quarter finals, Inter were drawn against Bundesliga leaders Bayern Munich with the first leg at the Allianz Arena. Lautaro Martínez scored in a stunner in the 38th minute to put Inter into the lead despite facing pressure from Bayern throughout the first half. Thomas Müller scored for Bayern in the 85th minute to level the match but Davide Frattesi scored an 88th-minute goal to win the match for Inter giving the Nerazzurri a 2–1 lead to take to the 2nd leg at the San Siro.

Inter then won their next Serie A game 3–1 against Cagliari to keep hold of their 3-point lead at the top of Serie A.

Inter then played the second leg of their Champions League quarter final tie against Bayern Munich at the San Siro. after a goalless first half, Harry Kane scored for Bayern in the 52nd minute to make the tie 2–2 on aggregate before Lautaro Martinez and Benjamin Pavard scored twice in three minutes to give Inter a 4–2 aggregate lead. Eric Dier would score an equaliser in the 76th minute to give Bayern hope but Inter held on to win 4–3 on aggerated and secure their spot in the semi-finals.

On the 20 April 2025, Inter suffered a major blow to their hopes of retaining the Serie A title after a late goal from Riccardo Orsolini resulted in a 1–0 defeat to Bologna. This allowed Napoli to draw level on points with Inter meaning the title would go down to a playoff if both sides finished level on points.

Three days later, Inter's bid for a treble came to an end after they lost 3–0 as the home team to rivals Milan in the Coppa Italia semi-finals, resulting in a 4–1 aggregate loss. This also meant Inter had failed to win any of the five Milan derbies this season, with four losses and one draw against Milan.

On 27 April 2025, Inter's title hopes took an even bigger hit after a 1–0 loss at home to Roma, whilst Napoli won the previous day, leaving the Nerazzurri three points off the Naples club with four games left to play.

Inter then finished the month of April by heading to the Estadi Olímpic Lluís Companys for the first leg of their Champions League semi-final against Barcelona. Inter would score a first-minute goal through Marcus Thuram and a 21st-minute goal from Denzel Dumfries only to pegged back by Barcelona to make it 2–2 after goals from Lamine Yamal and Ferran Torres. Dumfries scored in the 63rd minute to give Inter the lead but Yann Sommer would concede an own goal after trying to save a shot from Raphinha. The game would finish 3–3 with the second leg to be played at the San Siro.

=== May ===
Inter began the month of May by beating Hellas Verona 1–0 at the San Siro to keep their slim hopes of winning the Serie A title up even though they were still three points behind Napoli with only three games to play in the season.

Inter then faced Barcelona in the second leg of the Champions League semi-finals. Lautaro Martínez would open the scoring in the 21st minute to give Inter the lead in the tie. Martínez would then be fouled by Pau Cubarsí earning Inter a penalty which was converted by Hakan Çalhanoğlu to give Inter a 2–0 half time lead. However, Barcelona would come back from two goals down for the sexond week in a row after goals from Eric Garcia and Dani Olmo made it 2–2. In the 87th minute, Raphinha would score to make it 3–2 to Barcelona, putting Inter on the brink of an exit from the Champions League. However, Francesco Acerbi scored in the sixth minute of stoppage time to make it 3–3 and send the tie to extra time. Davide Frattesi would then score nine minutes into extra time to make it 4–3 to Inter, and despite many chances from Barcelona, including two saved shots from Lamine Yamal by Yann Sommer, Inter held on to win 4–3 and 7–6 on aggregate to make the Champions League final for the second time in three seasons, and seventh time in their history. The semi-final was described by pundits and fans as one of the greatest semi-finals in the history of the Champions League.

Inter then beat Torino 2–0 in Serie A to close the gap to leaders Napoli to one point after the Azzurri were held to a 2–2 draw by Genoa. However they missed out on the chance to go into the final day top of the league after a 2–2 draw with Lazio at home on the 18th of May 2025, and despite beating Como 2–0 on the final day of the season, Napoli beat Caligari 2–0 to clinch their fourth scudetto.

In the 2025 UEFA Champions League final, Inter would lose 0–5 against Paris Saint-Germain, the biggest margin of defeat in a final in the competition's history.

=== June ===
Three days after the defeat to Paris Saint-Germain in the Champions League final, Inter announced that head coach Simone Inzaghi had left his role by mutual consent. On 5 June 2025, during the special transfer window opened before the 2025 FIFA Club World Cup, Inter announced the signing of Croatian midfielder Petar Sučić form Dinamo Zagreb for a reported fee of €14 million plus bonuses. Two days later, the club also officialised the acquisition of Brazilian winger Luis Henrique from Olympique de Marseille for a reported €23 million plus bonuses.

On 9 June 2025, Inter announced that former player Cristian Chivu would replace Inzaghi as head coach of the first team on a 2-year contract. On 10 June, Argentine forward Joaquín Correa officially joined Brazilian side Botafogo.

On 17 June, Inter was held to a 1–1 draw by Mexican side Monterrey in the Club World Cup opener, with Lautaro scoring the equaliser after Sergio Ramos headed goal. On 21 June, Inter secured a 2–1 victory over Urawa Red Diamonds. The Japanese side took an early lead through a goal by Ryōma Watanabe, but Inter responded with a bicycle kick from Lautaro Martínez. Valentín Carboni sealed the win with a stoppage-time goal. On 25 June, Inter advanced to the round of 16 with a 2–0 victory over River Plate, thanks to goals from Francesco Pio Esposito, who scored his first goal for the club, and Alessandro Bastoni. On 30 June, Inter's season came to an end as they were eliminated from the Club World Cup in the round of 16, following a 2–0 defeat to Brazilian side Fluminense.

== Players ==
=== First-team squad ===
As of 30 June 2025

Note: Flags indicate national team as defined under FIFA eligibility rules. Players may hold more than one non-FIFA nationality.

No.	Player	Nat.	Position(s)	Date of birth (age)	Height	Preferred Foot	Signed		Transfer fee	Contract end	Ref.
No.	Player	Nat.	Position(s)	Date of birth (age)	Height	Preferred Foot	In	From	Transfer fee	Contract end	Ref.
Goalkeepers
1	Yann Sommer	SUI	GK	17 December 1988 (aged 36)	1.83 m (6 ft 0 in)	Right	2023	(Germany) Bayern Munich	€6.9m	2026	
12	Raffaele Di Gennaro	ITA	GK	3 October 1993 (aged 31)	1.86 m (6 ft 1 in)	Right	2023	(Italy) Gubbio	Free	2025	
13	Josep Martínez	ESP	GK	27 May 1998 (aged 27)	1.91 m (6 ft 3 in)	Right	2024	(Italy) Genoa	€13.2m	2029	
Defenders
2	Denzel Dumfries	NED	RWB	18 April 1996 (aged 29)	1.88 m (6 ft 2 in)	Right	2021	(Netherlands) PSV Eindhoven	€14.25m	2028	
6	Stefan de Vrij	NED	CB	5 February 1992 (aged 33)	1.89 m (6 ft 2 in)	Right	2018	(Italy) Lazio	Free	2025	
15	Francesco Acerbi	ITA	CB	10 February 1988 (aged 37)	1.92 m (6 ft 4 in)	Left	2022 (Note: Initially signed on loan. The indicated transfer fee represents the total amount, including the initial loan fee.)	(Italy) Lazio	€4.0m	2026	
28	Benjamin Pavard	FRA	CB / RB	28 March 1996 (aged 29)	1.86 m (6 ft 1 in)	Right	2023	(Germany) Bayern Munich	€31.3m	2028	
30	Carlos Augusto	BRA	LWB / CB	7 January 1999 (aged 26)	1.84 m (6 ft 0 in)	Left	2023	(Italy) Monza	€13.2m	2028	
31	Yann Aurel Bisseck	GER	CB	29 November 2000 (aged 24)	1.96 m (6 ft 5 in)	Right	2023	(Denmark) AGF	€7.2m	2029	
32	Federico Dimarco	ITA	LWB / CB	10 November 1997 (aged 27)	1.75 m (5 ft 9 in)	Left	2018	(Switzerland) Sion	€5.2m	2027	
36	Matteo Darmian	ITA	RWB / LWB / CB	2 December 1989 (aged 35)	1.82 m (6 ft 0 in)	Right	2020	(Italy) Parma	€3.3m	2026	
42	Tomás Palacios (Note: Returned from loan during the Club World Cup transfer window.)	ARG	CB	28 April 2003 (aged 22)	1.96 m (6 ft 5 in)	Left	2024	(Argentina) Independiente Rivadavia	€6.5m	2029	
95	Alessandro Bastoni	ITA	CB	13 April 1999 (aged 26)	1.90 m (6 ft 3 in)	Left	2017	(Italy) Atalanta	€31.1m	2028	
Midfielders
7	Piotr Zieliński	POL	CM / AM	20 May 1994 (aged 31)	1.80 m (5 ft 11 in)	Both	2024	(Italy) Napoli	Free	2028	
8	Petar Sučić (Note: Signed during the Club World Cup transfer window.)	CRO	CM / DM	25 October 2003 (aged 21)	1.83 m (6 ft 0 in)	Right	2025	(Croatia) Dinamo Zagreb	€14.0m	2030	
11	Luis Henrique	BRA	RW / LW / RWB / LWB	14 December 2001 (aged 23)	1.81 m (5 ft 11 in)	Right	2025	(France) Marseille	€23.0m	2030	
16	Davide Frattesi	ITA	CM / AM	22 September 1999 (aged 25)	1.78 m (5 ft 10 in)	Right	2023	(Italy) Sassuolo	€31.9m	2028	
20	Hakan Çalhanoğlu	TUR	DM / CM / AM	8 February 1994 (aged 31)	1.78 m (5 ft 10 in)	Right	2021	(Italy) Milan	Free	2027	
21	Kristjan Asllani	ALB	DM / CM	9 March 2002 (aged 23)	1.79 m (5 ft 10 in)	Right	2022	(Italy) Empoli	€14.5m	2028	
22	Henrikh Mkhitaryan	ARM	CM / AM	21 January 1989 (aged 36)	1.77 m (5 ft 10 in)	Both	2022	(Italy) Roma	Free	2026	
23	Nicolò Barella (vice-captain)	ITA	CM	7 February 1997 (aged 28)	1.75 m (5 ft 9 in)	Right	2019	(Italy) Cagliari	€40.5m	2029	
45	Valentín Carboni	ARG	AM / SS	5 March 2005 (aged 20)	1.85 m (6 ft 1 in)	Left	2022	Youth sector	N/A	2029	
59	Nicola Zalewski	POL	LW / RW / LWB / RWB / AM	23 January 2002 (aged 23)	1.75 m (5 ft 9 in)	Right	2025 (Note: Signed during the winter transfer window.)	(Italy) Roma (on loan)	€0.6m (Note: Loan fee.)	2025	
Forwards
8	Marko Arnautović	AUT	ST	19 April 1989 (aged 36)	1.92 m (6 ft 4 in)	Both	2023	(Italy) Bologna	€10.9m	2025	
9	Marcus Thuram	FRA	ST	6 August 1997 (aged 27)	1.92 m (6 ft 4 in)	Right	2023	(Germany) Borussia Mönchengladbach	Free	2028	
10	Lautaro Martínez (captain)	ARG	ST	22 August 1997 (aged 27)	1.74 m (5 ft 9 in)	Right	2018	(Argentina) Racing Club	€25.0m	2029	
70	Sebastiano Esposito	ITA	ST / SS	2 July 2002 (aged 22)	1.86 m (6 ft 1 in)	Right	2019	Youth sector	N/A	2026	
94	Francesco Pio Esposito	ITA	ST	28 June 2005 (aged 20)	1.91 m (6 ft 3 in)	Right	2023	Youth sector	N/A	2030	
99	Mehdi Taremi	IRN	ST	18 July 1992 (aged 32)	1.85 m (6 ft 1 in)	Right	2024	(Portugal) Porto	Free	2027	
Players transferred out during the season
11	Joaquín Correa	ARG	SS / ST	13 August 1994 (aged 30)	1.89 m (6 ft 2 in)	Right	2021	(Italy) Lazio	€33.36m	2025	
17	Tajon Buchanan	CAN	RW / LW / RWB / LWB	8 February 1999 (aged 26)	1.83 m (6 ft 0 in)	Right	2024	(Belgium) Club Brugge	€7.3m	2028	

=== Youth academy players ===
As of 2 April 2025

Inter Primavera players that received a first-team squad call-up.

Note: Flags indicate national team as defined under FIFA eligibility rules. Players may hold more than one non-FIFA nationality.

No.	Player	Nat.	Position(s)	Date of birth (age)
40	Alessandro Calligaris	(Italy)	GK	7 March 2005 (age 21)
47	Matteo Lavelli	(Italy)	ST	8 December 2006 (age 19)
48	Gabriele Re Cecconi	(Italy)	CB	25 April 2006 (age 20)
49	Giacomo De Pieri	(Italy)	RW / AM	29 December 2006 (age 19)
50	Mike Aidoo	(Italy)	RB	30 May 2005 (age 21)
51	Christos Alexiou	(Greece)	CB	30 June 2005 (age 21)
52	Thomas Berenbruch	(Italy)	CM / AM	31 May 2005 (age 21)
53	Luka Topalović	(Slovenia)	CM / AM	23 February 2006 (age 20)
54	Mattia Zanchetta	(Italy)	DM	18 March 2006 (age 20)
55	Matteo Motta	(Italy)	LB	10 February 2005 (age 21)
56	Matteo Spinaccè	(Italy)	ST	13 July 2006 (age 20)
57	Daniele Quieto	(Venezuela)	LW / AM	22 October 2005 (age 21)
58	Matteo Cocchi	(Italy)	LB	1 February 2007 (age 19)
60	Alain Taho	(Albania)	GK	30 April 2007 (age 19)

== Transfers ==
=== In ===
==== Transfers ====
Date	Pos.	Player	Moving from	Fee	Notes	Ref.
Summer
1 July 2024	DF	(Brazil) Carlos Augusto	(Italy) Monza	€7.5M	From loan to permanent transfer	
1 July 2024	MF	(Italy) Davide Frattesi	(Italy) Sassuolo	€27.0M	From loan to permanent transfer	
1 July 2024	FW	(Austria) Marko Arnautović	(Italy) Bologna	€8.0M	From loan to permanent transfer	
6 July 2024	MF	(Poland) Piotr Zieliński	(Italy) Napoli	Free transfer		
8 July 2024	MF	(Slovenia) Luka Topalović	(Slovenia) Domžale	€1.0M	Assigned to the under-20 squad	
9 July 2024	GK	(Spain) Josep Martínez	(Italy) Genoa	€13.2M + €2.0M		
13 July 2024	FW	(Iran) Mehdi Taremi	(Portugal) Porto	Free transfer		
9 August 2024	FW	(Argentina) Thiago Romano	(Greece) Panathinaikos	€0.45M	Assigned to the under-20 squad	
30 August 2024	DF	(Argentina) Tomás Palacios	(Argentina) Independiente Rivadavia	€6.5M + €4.5M		
Club World Cup transfer window
4 June 2025	MF	(Croatia) Petar Sučić	(Croatia) Dinamo Zagreb	€14.0M + €2.0M		
7 June 2025	MF	(Brazil) Luis Henrique	(France) Marseille	€23.0M + €2.0M		

==== On loan ====
Date	Pos.	Player	Loaned from	Fee	Notes	Ref.
Summer
19 July 2023	DF	(Spain) Álex Pérez	(Spain) Real Betis	N/A	Option to buy for €0.5M, assigned to the under-20 squad	
Winter
1 February 2025	MF	(Poland) Nicola Zalewski	(Italy) Roma	€0.6M	Option to buy for €6.5M	

==== Loan returns ====
Date	Pos.	Player	Returning from	Notes	Ref.
Summer
30 June 2024	GK	(Romania) Ionuț Radu	(England) Bournemouth		
30 June 2024	GK	(Italy) William Rovida	(Italy) Pro Patria		
30 June 2024	GK	(Serbia) Filip Stanković	(Italy) Sampdoria		
30 June 2024	DF	(Argentina) Franco Carboni	(Italy) Ternana		
30 June 2024	DF	(Italy) Alessandro Fontanarosa	(Italy) Cosenza		
30 June 2024	DF	(Italy) Andrea Moretti	(Italy) Pro Patria		
30 June 2024	DF	(Italy) Alessandro Silvestro	(Italy) Foggia		
30 June 2024	DF	(Belgium) Zinho Vanheusden	(Belgium) Standard Liège		
30 June 2024	DF	(Italy) Mattia Zanotti	(Switzerland) St. Gallen		
30 June 2024	MF	(France) Lucien Agoumé	(Spain) Sevilla		
30 June 2024	MF	(Argentina) Valentín Carboni	(Italy) Monza		
30 June 2024	MF	(Italy) Jacopo Gianelli	(Italy) Fermana		
30 June 2024	MF	(Bulgaria) Nikola Iliev	(Bulgaria) CSKA 1948		
30 June 2024	MF	(Italy) Jacopo Martini	(Italy) Foggia		
30 June 2024	MF	(Italy) Francesco Nunziatini	(Italy) Torres		
30 June 2024	MF	(Italy) Gaetano Oristanio	(Italy) Cagliari		
30 June 2024	FW	(Argentina) Joaquín Correa	(France) Marseille		
30 June 2024	FW	(Italy) Dennis Curatolo	(Italy) Pro Patria		
30 June 2024	FW	(Italy) Francesco Pio Esposito	(Italy) Spezia		
30 June 2024	FW	(Italy) Sebastiano Esposito	(Italy) Sampdoria		
30 June 2024	FW	(Italy) Eddie Salcedo	(Italy) Lecco		
30 June 2024	FW	(Uruguay) Martín Satriano	(France) Brest		
30 June 2024	FW	(Poland) Jan Żuberek	(Italy) Ternana		
23 August 2024	DF	(Argentina) Franco Carboni	(Argentina) River Plate		
Winter
24 January 2025	GK	(Italy) Paolo Raimondi	(Italy) Pergolettese		
30 January 2025	MF	(France) Issiaka Kamate	(Portugal) AVS		
2 February 2025	DF	(Italy) Alessandro Fontanarosa	(Italy) Reggiana		
2 February 2025	FW	(Poland) Jan Żuberek	(Italy) Lecco		
3 February 2025	FW	(Italy) Enoch Owusu	(Italy) Novara		
11 February 2025	MF	(Argentina) Valentín Carboni	(France) Marseille		
Club World Cup transfer window
11 June 2025	DF	(Argentina) Tomás Palacios	(Italy) Monza		
11 June 2025	FW	(Italy) Francesco Pio Esposito	(Italy) Spezia		
11 June 2025	FW	(Italy) Sebastiano Esposito	(Italy) Empoli		

=== Out ===
==== Released players ====
Date	Pos.	Player	Subsequent club	Join date	Notes	Ref.
Summer
1 July 2024	MF	(Colombia) Juan Cuadrado	(Italy) Atalanta	26 August 2024	End of contract	
1 July 2024	MF	(Netherlands) Davy Klaassen	(Netherlands) Ajax	17 September 2024	End of contract	
1 July 2024	MF	(Italy) Stefano Sensi	(Italy) Monza	8 August 2024	End of contract	
1 July 2024	FW	(Chile) Alexis Sánchez	(Italy) Udinese	10 August 2024	End of contract	

==== Transfers ====
Date	Pos.	Player	Moving to	Fee	Notes	Ref.
Summer
1 July 2024	MF	(Bulgaria) Nikola Iliev	(Bulgaria) Botev Plovdiv	€0.3M	Officialised on 22 June 2024	
3 July 2024	GK	(Italy) William Rovida	(Italy) Pro Patria	Undisclosed	From loan to permanent transfer	
11 July 2024	MF	(Italy) Jacopo Martini	(Italy) Südtirol	Undisclosed		
13 July 2024	DF	(Italy) Mattia Zanotti	(Switzerland) Lugano	€2.6M		
13 July 2024	MF	(Italy) Gaetano Oristanio	(Italy) Venezia	€5.0M	30% sell-on clause	
17 July 2024	MF	(Italy) Francesco Nunziatini	(Italy) Torres	Undisclosed		
18 July 2024	FW	(Italy) Dennis Curatolo	(Italy) Pro Patria	Undisclosed		
19 July 2024	DF	(Italy) Alessandro Silvestro	(Italy) Foggia	Undisclosed		
26 July 2024	DF	(Italy) Andrea Moretti	(Italy) Triestina	Undisclosed		
27 July 2024	DF	(Slovenia) Samo Matjaž	(Slovenia) Celje	Undisclosed		
6 August 2024	MF	(France) Lucien Agoumé	(Spain) Sevilla	€5.0M	50% sell-on clause (Note: Sevilla has the option to pay an additional €4.0M to lower the sell-on clause to 10%.)	
Winter
3 February 2025	GK	(Romania) Ionuț Radu	(Italy) Venezia	Undisclosed		
Club World Cup transfer window
10 June 2025	FW	(Argentina) Joaquín Correa	(Brazil) Botafogo	Undisclosed		

==== Loans out ====
Date	Pos.	Player	Loaned to	Fee	Notes	Ref.
Summer
3 July 2024	MF	(Serbia) Aleksandar Stanković	(Switzerland) Luzern	N/A	Loan with option to buy and counter-option	
11 July 2024	DF	(Italy) Giacomo Stabile	(Italy) Alcione	N/A		
12 July 2024	DF	(Argentina) Franco Carboni	(Argentina) River Plate	€0.5M	Option to buy for €4.0M, €12.0M buy-back clause	
17 July 2024	GK	(Italy) Paolo Raimondi	(Italy) Prgolettese	N/A		
17 July 2024	FW	(Italy) Sebastiano Esposito	(Italy) Empoli	N/A	Loan with option to buy	
19 July 2024	FW	(Italy) Francesco Pio Esposito	(Italy) Spezia	N/A		
19 July 2024	MF	(Nigeria) Ebenezer Akinsanmiro	(Italy) Sampdoria	N/A	Loan with option to buy and counter-option	
19 July 2024	FW	(Senegal) Amadou Sarr	(Italy) Foggia	N/A		
25 July 2024	DF	(Belgium) Zinho Vanheusden	(Belgium) KV Mechelen	N/A	Loan with option to buy	
1 August 2024	DF	(Italy) Francesco Stante	(Italy) Pergolettese	N/A		
7 August 2024	MF	(Argentina) Valentín Carboni	(France) Marseille	€1.0M	Option to buy for €36.0M, €40.0M counter-option	
9 August 2024	FW	(Poland) Jan Żuberek	(Italy) Lecco	N/A		
9 August 2024	MF	(Italy) Luca Di Maggio	(Italy) Perugia	N/A		
12 August 2024	GK	(Serbia) Filip Stanković	(Italy) Venezia	N/A	Loan with option and conditional obligation to buy	
21 August 2024	MF	(France) Issiaka Kamate	(Portugal) AVS	N/A	Loan with option to buy and counter-option	
23 August 2024	FW	(Uruguay) Martín Satriano	(France) Lens	€1.0M	Obligation to buy for €5.0M + €1.0M	
27 August 2024	DF	(Italy) Alessandro Fontanarosa	(Italy) Reggiana	N/A		
30 August 2024	DF	(Argentina) Franco Carboni	(Italy) Venezia	N/A	Loan with option to buy and counter-option	
31 August 2024	FW	(Italy) Enoch Owusu	(Italy) Novara	N/A		
11 September 2024	FW	(Italy) Eddie Salcedo	(Greece) OFI	N/A		
Winter
27 January 2025	GK	(Italy) Paolo Raimondi	(Italy) Pro Palazzolo	N/A		
29 January 2025	DF	(Argentina) Tomás Palacios	(Italy) Monza	N/A		
31 January 2025	MF	(France) Issiaka Kamate	(Italy) Modena	N/A		
1 February 2025	MF	(Canada) Tajon Buchanan	(Spain) Villarreal	€1.0M	Option to buy for €13.0M	
3 February 2025	DF	(Italy) Alessandro Fontanarosa	(Italy) Carrarese	N/A		
3 February 2025	FW	(Poland) Jan Żuberek	(Italy) Avellino	N/A		
7 February 2025	FW	(Italy) Enoch Owusu	(Switzerland) St. Gallen	N/A	Loan with option to buy	

==== Loans ended ====
Date	Pos.	Player	Returning to	Notes	Ref.
Summer
30 June 2024	GK	(Italy) Emil Audero	(Italy) Sampdoria		
30 June 2024	DF	(Brazil) Carlos Augusto	(Italy) Monza		
30 June 2024	MF	(Italy) Davide Frattesi	(Italy) Sassuolo		
30 June 2024	FW	(Austria) Marko Arnautović	(Italy) Bologna		

== Pre-season and friendlies ==
Win Draw Loss Fixtures

17 July 2024 Friendly	Internazionale	3–2	Lugano	Appiano Gentile
18:30 CEST (UTC+2)	Correa 5'; Taremi 53' (pen.), 60'	Report	Przybyłko 19' (pen.), 25'	Stadium: BPER Training Centre; Referee: Kevin Bonacina (Italy)
Note: Match was played in two halves of forty minutes each.

22 July 2024 Friendly	Internazionale	2–1	Pergolettese	Appiano Gentile
18:30 CEST (UTC+2)	Taremi 34'; Salcedo 88'	Report	Capoferri 90+1'	Stadium: BPER Training Centre; Referee: Andrea Calzavara

27 July 2024 Friendly	Internazionale	3–0	Las Palmas	Cesena
19:30 CEST (UTC+2)	Taremi 11' (pen.), 37'; Dimarco 85'	Report		Stadium: Stadio Dino Manuzzi; Referee: Juan Luca Sacchi (Italy)

2 August 2024 Friendly	Pisa	1–1	Internazionale	Pisa
19:30 CEST (UTC+2)	Piccinini 45+1'	Report	Bisseck 90+6'	Stadium: Arena Garibaldi; Referee: Valerio Crezzini

7 August 2024 Friendly	Internazionale	0–2	Al-Ittihad	Monza
20:30 CEST (UTC+2)		Report	Diaby 25', 47', (yellow card) 68'	Stadium: Stadio Brianteo; Referee: Niccolò Turrini (Italy)

11 August 2024 Friendly	Chelsea	1–1	Internazionale	Fulham, England
15:00 BST (UTC+1)	Colwill (yellow card) 30'; Cucurella (yellow card) 42'; Ugochukwu 90'	Report	Thuram 26'; Acerbi (yellow card) 30'; Mkhitaryan (yellow card) 59'	Stadium: Stamford Bridge; Attendance: 34,471; Referee: Sam Barrott (England)

== Competitions ==
=== Overview ===
Competition	First match	Last match	Starting round	Final position	Record							
Competition	First match	Last match	Starting round	Final position	Pld	W	D	L	GF	GA	GD	Win %
Serie A	17 August 2024	23 May 2025	Matchday 1	2nd	38	24	9	5	79	35	+44	63.16
Coppa Italia	19 December 2024	23 April 2025	Round of 16	Semi-finals	4	2	1	1	5	4	+1	50.00
Supercoppa Italiana	2 January 2025	6 January 2025	Semi-finals	Runners-up	2	1	0	1	4	3	+1	50.00
UEFA Champions League	18 September 2024	31 May 2025	League phase	Runners-up	15	10	3	2	26	16	+10	66.67
FIFA Club World Cup	17 June 2025	30 June 2025	Group stage	Round of 16	4	2	1	1	5	4	+1	50.00
Total					63	39	14	10	119	62	+57	61.90

Source: Soccerway

=== Serie A ===
==== League table ====
Pos	Team	Pld	W	D	L	GF	GA	GD	Pts	Qualification or relegation
1	Napoli (C)	38	24	10	4	59	27	+32	82	Qualification for the Champions League league phase
2	Inter Milan	38	24	9	5	79	35	+44	81	Qualification for the Champions League league phase
3	Atalanta	38	22	8	8	78	37	+41	74	Qualification for the Champions League league phase
4	Juventus	38	18	16	4	58	35	+23	70	Qualification for the Champions League league phase
5	Roma	38	20	9	9	56	35	+21	69	Qualification for the Europa League league phase

Source: Serie A
Rules for classification: 1) Points; 2) Tiebreaker for Champions team and third relegated team; 3) Head-to-head points; 4) Head-to-head goal difference; 5) Goal difference; 6) Goals scored; 7) Draw.
(Note: Head-to-head record is used only after all the matches between the teams in question have been played)
(C) Champions

==== Results summary ====
Overall								Home						Away					
Pld	W	D	L	GF	GA	GD	Pts	W	D	L	GF	GA	GD	W	D	L	GF	GA	GD
38	24	9	5	79	35	+44	81	13	4	2	40	21	+19	11	5	3	39	14	+25

Source: Serie A

==== Results by round ====
Round	1	2	3	4	5	6	7	8	9	10	11	12	13	15	16	17	18	20	19^{1}	21	22	23	14^{2}	24	25	26	27	28	29	30	31	32	33	34	35	36	37	38
Ground	A	H	H	A	H	A	H	A	H	A	H	H	A	H	A	H	A	A	H	H	A	A	A	H	A	H	A	H	A	H	A	H	A	H	H	A	H	A
Result	D	W	W	D	L	W	W	W	D	W	W	D	W	W	W	W	W	W	D	W	W	D	L	W	L	W	D	W	W	W	D	W	L	L	W	W	D	W
Position	7	2	1	3	6	4	2	2	2	2	2	4	3	3	3	3	3	2	2	2	2	2	2	2	2	1	1	1	1	1	1	1	1	2	2	2	2	2
Points	1	4	7	8	8	11	14	17	18	21	24	25	28	31	34	37	40	43	44	47	50	51	51	54	54	57	58	61	64	67	68	71	71	71	74	77	78	81

Source: Serie A
A = Away; H = Home; W = Win; D = Draw; L = Loss
Notes:
- Positions show the situation at the end of the corresponding gameweeks (GW), not the position at the conclusion of matches or game days.

^{1} Matchday 19 (vs Bologna) was postponed due to Inter's participation in the Supercoppa Italiana.
^{2} Matchday 14 (vs Fiorentina) was suspended in the 17th minute after Fiorentina player Edoardo Bove collapsed on the pitch; the remainder of the match was postponed to a later date.

==== Matches ====
The league fixtures were released on 4 July 2024.

17 August 2024 1	Genoa	2–2	Internazionale	Genoa
18:30 CEST (UTC+2)	Vogliacco 20'; Gollini (yellow card) 63'; Messias (penalty missed) 90+5', 90+5'	Report	Mkhitaryan (yellow card) 16'; Thuram 30', 84'; Asllani (yellow card) 90+9'	Stadium: Stadio Luigi Ferraris; Attendance: 33,300; Referee: Ermanno Feliciani

24 August 2024 2	Internazionale	2–0	Lecce	Milan
20:45 CEST (UTC+2)	Darmian 5'; Çalhanoğlu 69' (pen.)	Report	Gallo (yellow card) 31'; Banda (yellow card) 60'	Stadium: San Siro; Attendance: 70,921; Referee: Davide Di Marco

30 August 2024 3	Internazionale	4–0	Atalanta	Milan
20:45 CEST (UTC+2)	Djimsiti 3' (o.g.); Barella 10'; Thuram 47', 56'	Report	De Roon (yellow card) 45+1'; Retegui (yellow card) 53'	Stadium: San Siro; Attendance: 71,745; Referee: Matteo Marchetti

15 September 2024 4	Monza	1–1	Internazionale	Monza
20:45 CEST (UTC+2)	Mota 81', (yellow card) 85'	Report	Dumfries (yellow card) 62', (goal) 88'; Pavard (yellow card) 90+5'	Stadium: Stadio Brianteo; Attendance: 14,541; Referee: Luca Pairetto

22 September 2024 5	Internazionale	1–2	Milan	Milan
20:45 CEST (UTC+2)	Mkhitaryan (yellow card) 18'; Dimarco 27', (yellow card) 88'; Çalhanoğlu (yellow card) 40'; Asllani (yellow card) 86'	Report	Pulisic 10'; Fofana (yellow card) 38'; Gabbia 89'	Stadium: San Siro; Attendance: 75,366; Referee: Maurizio Mariani

28 September 2024 6	Udinese	2–3	Internazionale	Udine
15:00 CEST (UTC+2)	Karlström (yellow card) 26'; Kabasele 35'; Lucca 83'	Report	Frattesi 1'; L. Martínez 45+3', 47'	Stadium: Stadio Friuli; Attendance: 24,611; Referee: Juan Luca Sacchi

5 October 2024 7	Internazionale	3–2	Torino	Milan
20:45 CEST (UTC+2)	Thuram 25', 35', 60'; Bisseck (yellow card) 37'	Report	Maripán (red card) 20'; Zapata 36'; Linetty (yellow card) 58'; Vlašić 86' (pen.); Walukiewicz (yellow card) 90+2'	Stadium: San Siro; Attendance: 73,348; Referee: Matteo Marcenaro

20 October 2024 8	Roma	0–1	Internazionale	Rome
20:45 CEST (UTC+2)	Cristante (yellow card) 49'; Pisilli (yellow card) 62'	Report	Barella (yellow card) 48'; L. Martínez 60'; Darmian (yellow card) 68'; Correa (yellow card) 78'	Stadium: Stadio Olimpico; Attendance: 64,199; Referee: Davide Massa

27 October 2024 9	Internazionale	4–4	Juventus	Milan
18:00 CET (UTC+1)	Zieliński 15' (pen.), 37' (pen.); Mkhitaryan 35'; Dumfries 53', (yellow card) 75'; Pavard (yellow card) 59'	Report	Vlahović 20'; Weah 26'; Danilo (yellow card) 52'; Yıldız 71', 82'	Stadium: San Siro; Attendance: 75,056; Referee: Marco Guida

30 October 2024 10	Empoli	0–3	Internazionale	Empoli
18:30 CET (UTC+1)	Goglichidze (red card) 31'; Cacace (yellow card) 38'	Report	Frattesi 50', 67'; Bastoni (yellow card) 62'; L. Martínez 79'	Stadium: Stadio Carlo Castellani; Attendance: 15,706; Referee: Matteo Marchetti

3 November 2024 11	Internazionale	1–0	Venezia	Milan
20:45 CET (UTC+1)	Pavard (yellow card) 31'; L. Martínez 65'; Frattesi (yellow card) 90+8'	Report	Zampano (yellow card) 49'	Stadium: San Siro; Attendance: 66,326; Referee: Maria Sole Ferrieri Caputi

10 November 2024 12	Internazionale	1–1	Napoli	Milan
20:45 CET (UTC+1)	Çalhanoğlu 43', (penalty missed) 74'; Dumfries (yellow card) 80'	Report	McTominay 23'	Stadium: San Siro; Attendance: 72,951; Referee: Maurizio Mariani

23 November 2024 13	Hellas Verona	0–5	Internazionale	Verona
15:00 CET (UTC+1)	Dawidowicz (yellow card) 33'; Belahyane (yellow card) 55'	Report	Correa 17'; Thuram 22', 25'; De Vrij 31'; Bisseck 41'; Arnautović (yellow card) 90+2'	Stadium: Stadio Marcantonio Bentegodi; Attendance: 27,141; Referee: Andrea Colombo

6 December 2024 15	Internazionale	3–1	Parma	Milan
18:30 CET (UTC+1)	Dimarco 40', (yellow card) 64'; Barella 53'; Thuram 66'	Report	Keita (yellow card) 10'; Darmian 81' (o.g.)	Stadium: San Siro; Attendance: 71,879; Referee: Rosario Abisso

16 December 2024 16	Lazio	0–6	Internazionale	Rome
20:45 CET (UTC+1)	Rovella (yellow card) 40'; Zaccagni (yellow card) 80'	Report	Çalhanoğlu (yellow card) 24', (goal) 41' (pen.); Bastoni (yellow card) 31'; Bisseck (yellow card) 44'; Dimarco 45'; Barella 51'; Dumfries 53'; Darmian (yellow card) 75'; Carlos Augusto 77'; Thuram 90'	Stadium: Stadio Olimpico; Attendance: 60,000; Referee: Daniele Chiffi

23 December 2024 17	Internazionale	2–0	Como	Milan
20:45 CET (UTC+1)	Bisseck (yellow card) 24'; Carlos Augusto 48'; Thuram 90+2', (yellow card) 90+2'	Report	Da Cunha (yellow card) 64'; Mazzitelli (yellow card) 87'	Stadium: San Siro; Attendance: 73,204; Referee: Antonio Giua

28 December 2024 18	Cagliari	0–3	Internazionale	Cagliari
18:00 CET (UTC+1)		Report	Bastoni 53'; L. Martínez 71'; Çalhanoğlu 78' (pen.)	Stadium: Unipol Domus; Attendance: 16,412; Referee: Daniele Doveri

12 January 2025 20	Venezia	0–1	Internazionale	Venice
15:00 CET (UTC+1)	Oristanio (yellow card) 14'; Zampano (yellow card) 44'; Nicolussi Caviglia (yellow card) 80'	Report	Darmian 16'; Asllani (yellow card) 41'	Stadium: Stadio Pier Luigi Penzo; Attendance: 12,048; Referee: Marco Piccinini

15 January 2025 19	Internazionale	2–2	Bologna	Milan
20:45 CET (UTC+1)	Dumfries 19'; L. Martínez 45+1'	Report	Castro 15'; Holm 64'	Stadium: San Siro; Attendance: 63,074; Referee: Luca Pairetto
Note: The match was originally scheduled for 5 January 2025, but was postponed due to Internazionale's participation in the Supercoppa Italiana.

19 January 2025 21	Internazionale	3–1	Empoli	Milan
20:45 CET (UTC+1)	L. Martínez 55'; Dumfries 79'; Thuram 89'	Report	Esposito 83'	Stadium: San Siro; Attendance: 61,230; Referee: Ermanno Feliciani

26 January 2025 22	Lecce	0–4	Internazionale	Lecce
18:00 CET (UTC+1)		Report	Frattesi 6'; De Vrij (yellow card) 16'; L. Martínez 39'; Dumfries 57'; Taremi 61' (pen.), (yellow card) 82'	Stadium: Stadio Via del mare Attendance: 27,223; Referee: Livio Marinelli

2 February 2025 23	Milan	1–1	Internazionale	Milan
18:00 CET (UTC+1)	Reijnders 45'	Report	Bastoni (yellow card) 53'; Dumfries (yellow card) 61'; De Vrij 90+3'	Stadium: San Siro; Attendance: 75,493; Referee: Daniele Chiffi

6 February 2025 14	Fiorentina	3–0	Internazionale	Florence
20:45 CET (UTC+1)	Ranieri 59'; Kean 68', 89', (yellow card) 69'	Report		Stadium: Stadio Artemio Franchi; Attendance: 22,351; Referee: Daniele Doveri
Note: The match was originally played on 1 December 2024 at 18:00, but was suspended in the 17th minute after Fiorentina player Edoardo Bove collapsed on the pitch. The remainder of the match was postponed to be completed on 6 February 2025.

10 February 2025 24	Internazionale	2–1	Fiorentina	Milan
20:45 CET (UTC+1)	Pongračić 28' (o.g.); Mkhitaryan (yellow card) 36'; Çalhanoğlu (yellow card) 45+2'; Arnautović 52'; Zalewski (yellow card) 70'; Barella (yellow card) 79'	Report	Richardson (yellow card) 39'; Mandragora 44' (pen.); Parisi (yellow card) 45+2'; Kean (yellow card) 66'	Stadium: San Siro; Attendance: 67,484; Referee: Federico La Penna

16 February 2025 25	Juventus	1–0	Internazionale	Turin
20:45 CET (UTC+1)	Conceição (yellow card) 52', (goal) 74'	Report	Barella (yellow card) 90'	Stadium: Juventus Stadium; Attendance: 41,361; Referee: Maurizio Mariani

22 February 2025 26	Internazionale	1–0	Genoa	Milan
20:45 CET (UTC+1)	L. Martínez 78'	Report	Miretti (yellow card) 55'; Ekuban (yellow card) 90+5'	Stadium: San Siro; Attendance: 68,271; Referee: Marco Piccinini

1 March 2025 27	Napoli	1–1	Internazionale	Naples
18:00 CET (UTC+1)	Billing 87'; Contini (yellow card) 88'	Report	Dimarco 22'	Stadium: Stadio Diego Armando Maradona; Attendance: 53,851; Referee: Daniele Doveri

8 March 2025 28	Internazionale	3–2	Monza	Milan
20:45 CET (UTC+1)	Arnautović 45+1'; Çalhanoğlu 64'; Kyriakopoulos 77' (o.g.)	Report	Birindelli 32'; Izzo (yellow card) 38'; Keita 44'	Stadium: San Siro; Attendance: 66,344; Referee: Luca Zufferli

16 March 2025 29	Atalanta	0–2	Internazionale	Bergamo
20:45 CET (UTC+1)	Bellanova (yellow card) 39'; Éderson (yellow card) 81' (yellow-red card) 81'	Report	Carlos Augusto 54'; Bastoni (yellow card) 79' (yellow-red card) 90+5'; Pavard (yellow card) 86'; L. Martínez 87'	Stadium: Gewiss Stadium; Attendance: 23,215; Referee: Davide Massa

30 March 2025 30	Internazionale	2–1	Udinese	Milan
18:00 CEST (UTC+2)	Arnautović 12'; Frattesi 29'; Asllani (yellow card) 90+1'; Barella (yellow card) 90+4'	Report	Solet 71'	Stadium: San Siro; Attendance: 71,924; Referee: Daniele Chiffi

5 April 2025 31	Parma	2–2	Internazionale	Parma
18:00 CEST (UTC+2)	Almqvist (yellow card) 28'; Bernabé 60'; Ondrejka 69'; Del Prato (yellow card) 90+2'	Report	Darmian 15'; Thuram 45'; Dimarco (yellow card) 57'; Zalewski (yellow card) 89'; Correa (yellow card) 90+5'	Stadium: Stadio Ennio Tardini; Attendance: 22,005; Referee: Daniele Doveri

12 April 2025 32	Internazionale	3–1	Cagliari	Milan
18:00 CEST (UTC+2)	Arnautović 13'; L. Martínez 26'; Bisseck 55'	Report	Piccoli 48'; Deiola (yellow card) 69'	Stadium: San Siro; Attendance: 71,799; Referee: Marco Di Bello

20 April 2025 33	Bologna	1–0	Internazionale	Bologna
18:00 CEST (UTC+2)	Ndoye (yellow card) 58'; Orsolini 90+4', (yellow card) 90+6'	Report	Mkhitaryan (yellow card) 39'; Bastoni (yellow card) 61'; Correa (yellow card) 81'	Stadium: Stadio Renato Dall'Ara; Attendance: 38,279; Referee: Andrea Colombo

27 April 2025 34	Internazionale	0–1	Roma	Milan
15:00 CEST (UTC+2)	L. Martínez (yellow card) 45'	Report	Mancini (yellow card) 3'; Soulé 22'; Koné (yellow card) 63'	Stadium: San Siro; Attendance: 70,240; Referee: Michael Fabbri
Note: The match was initially scheduled for 26 April 2025 at 18:00, but was postponed to the following day due to the funeral of Pope Francis.

3 May 2025 35	Internazionale	1–0	Hellas Verona	Milan
20:45 CEST (UTC+2)	Asllani 9' (pen.); Darmian (yellow card) 23'	Report	Valentini (yellow card) 46'; Duda (yellow card) 71'; Kastanos (yellow card) 85'	Stadium: San Siro; Attendance: 70,222; Referee: Gianluca Manganiello

11 May 2025 36	Torino	0–2	Internazionale	Turin
18:00 CEST (UTC+2)	Milinković-Savić (yellow card) 47'	Report	Zalewski 14', (yellow card) 56'; Carlos Augusto (yellow card) 25'; Bisseck (yellow card) 43'; Asllani 49' (pen.)	Stadium: Stadio Olimpico Grande Torino; Attendance: 26,537; Referee: Federico La Penna

18 May 2025 37	Internazionale	2–2	Lazio	Milan
20:45 CEST (UTC+2)	Çalhanoğlu (yellow card) 38'; Bisseck 45+2'; Dumfries 79'	Report	Castellanos (yellow card) 45'; Gila (yellow card) 61'; Pedro 72', 90' (pen.); Romagnoli (yellow card) 78'	Stadium: San Siro; Attendance: 71,060; Referee: Daniele Chiffi

23 May 2025 38	Como	0–2	Internazionale	Como
20:45 CEST (UTC+2)	Reina (red card) 45'; Strefezza (yellow card) 45+1'	Report	Çalhanoğlu (yellow card) 12'; De Vrij 20', (yellow card) 47'; Zalewski (yellow card) 43'; Correa 51'	Stadium: Stadio Giuseppe Sinigaglia; Attendance: 10,656; Referee: Davide Massa

=== Coppa Italia ===
19 December 2024 Round of 16	Internazionale	2–0	Udinese	Milan
21:00 CET (UTC+1)	Asllani (yellow card) 15', (goal) 45+2'; Arnautović 30'	Report		Stadium: San Siro; Attendance: 53,756; Referee: Luca Massimi

25 February 2025 Quarter-finals	Internazionale	2–0	Lazio	Milan
21:00 CET (UTC+1)	Asllani (yellow card) 14'; Arnautović 39'; Çalhanoğlu 77' (pen.); Dumfries (yellow card) 85'	Report	Isaksen (yellow card) 33'; Pellegrini (yellow card) 36'; Gigot (yellow card) 75'; Guendouzi (yellow card) 76'; Ibrahimović (yellow card) 79'	Stadium: San Siro; Attendance: 53,333; Referee: Michael Fabbri

2 April 2025 Semi-finals; First leg	Milan	1–1	Internazionale	Milan
21:00 CEST (UTC+2)	Hernandez (yellow card) 19'; Abraham 47'; Reijnders (yellow card) 89'	Report	Acerbi (yellow card) 53'; Bisseck (yellow card) 58'; Çalhanoğlu 67'	Stadium: San Siro; Attendance: 67,595; Referee: Michael Fabbri

23 April 2025 Semi-finals; Second leg	Internazionale	0–3 (1–4 agg.)	Milan	Milan
21:00 CEST (UTC+2)	Çalhanoğlu (yellow card) 71'	Report	Jović 36', 49'; Reijnders 85'	Stadium: San Siro; Attendance: 75,552; Referee: Daniele Doveri

=== Supercoppa Italiana ===
2 January 2025 Semi-finals	Internazionale	2–0	Atalanta	Riyadh, Saudi Arabia
22:00 SAST (UTC+3)	Dumfries 49', 61'; Carlos Augusto (yellow card) 88'	Report	Scalvini (yellow card) 28'	Stadium: King Saud University Stadium; Attendance: 16,896; Referee: Daniele Chiffi

6 January 2025 Final	Internazionale	2–3	Milan	Riyadh, Saudi Arabia
22:00 SAST (UTC+3)	L. Martínez 45+1'; Taremi 47'; Mkhitaryan (yellow card) 51'; Dumfries (yellow card) 54'; Barella (yellow card) 72'; Bastoni (yellow card) 89'	Report	Hernandez 52'; Tomori (yellow card) 57'; Pulisic 80'; Abraham 90+3'	Stadium: King Saud University Stadium; Attendance: 24,841; Referee: Simone Sozza

=== UEFA Champions League ===
==== League phase ====
The league phase draw took place on 29 August 2024.

Pos	Team	Pld	W	D	L	GF	GA	GD	Pts	Qualification
2	(Royal Spanish Football Federation) Barcelona	8	6	1	1	28	13	+15	19	Advance to round of 16 (seeded)
3	(The Football Association) Arsenal	8	6	1	1	16	3	+13	19	Advance to round of 16 (seeded)
4	(Italian Football Federation) Inter Milan	8	6	1	1	11	1	+10	19	Advance to round of 16 (seeded)
5	(Royal Spanish Football Federation) Atlético Madrid	8	6	0	2	20	12	+8	18	Advance to round of 16 (seeded)
6	(German Football Association) Bayer Leverkusen	8	5	1	2	15	7	+8	16	Advance to round of 16 (seeded)

Source: UEFA
Rules for classification: League phase tiebreakers

Round	1	2	3	4	5	6	7	8
Ground	A	H	A	H	H	A	A	H
Result	D	W	W	W	W	L	W	W
Position	16	9	7	5	2	6	4	4
Points	1	4	7	10	13	13	16	19

Source: UEFA
A = Away; H = Home; W = Win; D = Draw; L = Loss

18 September 2024 1	Manchester City (England)	0–0	(Italy) Internazionale	Manchester, England
20:00 BST (UTC+1)	Dias (yellow card) 33'	Report		Stadium: City of Manchester Stadium; Attendance: 50,922; Referee: Glenn Nyberg (Sweden)

1 October 2024 2	Internazionale (Italy)	4–0	(Serbia) Red Star Belgrade	Milan, Italy
21:00 CEST (UTC+2)	Çalhanoğlu 11'; Mkhitaryan (yellow card) 15'; De Vrij (yellow card) 48'; Arnautović 59'; L. Martínez 71'; Taremi 81' (pen.)	Report	Elšnik (yellow card) 69'	Stadium: San Siro; Attendance: 56,391; Referee: Felix Zwayer (Germany)

23 October 2024 3	Young Boys (Switzerland)	0–1	(Italy) Internazionale	Bern, Switzerland
21:00 CEST (UTC+2)	Hadjam (yellow card) 33'; Monteiro (yellow card) 35'; Imeri (yellow card) 36'; Maleš (yellow card) 81'	Report	Dumfries (yellow card) 35'; Arnautović (penalty missed) 48'; Thuram 90+3'	Stadium: Stadion Wankdorf; Attendance: 31,500; Referee: Michael Oliver (England)

6 November 2024 4	Internazionale (Italy)	1–0	(England) Arsenal	Milan, Italy
21:00 CET (UTC+1)	L. Martínez (yellow card) 15'; Çalhanoğlu 45+3' (pen.); Barella (yellow card) 68'	Report	Gabriel (yellow card) 15'; Gabriel Jesus (yellow card) 68'	Stadium: San Siro; Attendance: 75,222; Referee: István Kovács (Romania)

26 November 2024 5	Internazionale (Italy)	1–0	(Germany) RB Leipzig	Milan, Italy
21:00 CET (UTC+1)	Pavard (yellow card) 11'; Lukeba 27' (o.g.); Bastoni (yellow card) 33'	Report	Baumgartner (yellow card) 34'; Lukeba (yellow card) 85'	Stadium: San Siro; Attendance: 63,174; Referee: João Pinheiro (Portugal)

10 December 2024 6	Bayer Leverkusen (Germany)	1–0	(Italy) Internazionale	Leverkusen, Germany
21:00 CET (UTC+1)	Mukiele 90'	Report	Çalhanoğlu (yellow card) 25'; Carlos Augusto (yellow card) 27'; Barella (yellow card) 90+4'	Stadium: BayArena; Attendance: 30,210; Referee: Slavko Vinčić (Slovenia)

22 January 2025 7	Sparta Prague (Czech Republic)	0–1	(Italy) Internazionale	Prague, Czech Republic
21:00 CET (UTC+1)	Olatunji (yellow card) 52'; Krasniqi (yellow card) 90+5'	Report	Dumfries (yellow card) 6'; L. Martínez 12'; Asllani (yellow card) 67'	Stadium: Stadion Letná; Attendance: 18,010; Referee: Alejandro Hernández Hernández (Spain)

29 January 2025 8	Internazionale (Italy)	3–0	(France) Monaco	Milan, Italy
21:00 CET (UTC+1)	L. Martínez 4' (pen.), 16', 67'; Pavard (yellow card) 66'; Asllani (yellow card) 81'	Report	Zakaria (yellow card) 3'; Mawissa (red card) 12'; Vanderson (yellow card) 45+3'	Stadium: San Siro; Attendance: 71,601; Referee: Irfan Peljto (Bosnia and Herzegovina)

==== Knockout phase ====
===== Round of 16 =====
The round of 16 draw took place on 21 February 2025.

5 March 2025 First leg	Feyenoord (Netherlands)	0–2	(Italy) Internazionale	Rotterdam, Netherlands
18:45 CET (UTC+1)	Mitchell (yellow card) 68'; Wellenreuther (yellow card) 71'; Osman (yellow card) 76'	Report	Thuram 38'; L. Martínez 50'; Zieliński (penalty missed) 65'; Bastoni (yellow card) 74'; Arnautović (yellow card) 90+6'	Stadium: De Kuip; Attendance: 43,789; Referee: Espen Eskås (Norway)

11 March 2025 Second leg	Internazionale (Italy)	2–1 (4–1 agg.)	(Netherlands) Feyenoord	Milan, Italy
21:00 CET (UTC+1)	Thuram 8', (yellow card) 69'; Çalhanoğlu 51' (pen.); Asllani (yellow card) 62'	Report	Moder 42' (pen.); Smal (yellow card) 45+1'	Stadium: San Siro; Attendance: 55,356; Referee: Ivan Kružliak (Slovakia)

===== Quarter-finals =====
The draw for the order of the quarter-final legs took place on 21 February 2025, after the round of 16 draw.

8 April 2025 First leg	Bayern Munich (Germany)	1–2	(Italy) Internazionale	Munich, Germany
21:00 CEST (UTC+2)	Kim (yellow card) 28'; Müller 85'	Report	L. Martínez 38', (yellow card) 53'; Mkhitaryan (yellow card) 71'; Frattesi 88', (yellow card) 89'; Zalewski (yellow card) 90+4'	Stadium: Allianz Arena; Attendance: 75,000; Referee: Sandro Schärer (Switzerland)

16 April 2025 Second leg	Internazionale (Italy)	2–2 (4–3 agg.)	(Germany) Bayern Munich	Milan, Italy
21:00 CEST (UTC+2)	L. Martínez 58'; Pavard 61'; Arnautović (yellow card) 69'; Dimarco (yellow card) 90+6'	Report	Kim (yellow card) 28'; Dier (yellow card) 45', (goal) 76'; Kane 52'	Stadium: San Siro; Attendance: 75,625; Referee: Slavko Vinčić (Slovenia)

===== Semi-finals =====
The draw for the order of the semi-final legs was held on 21 February 2025, after the round of 16 and quarter-final draw.

30 April 2025 First leg	Barcelona (Spain)	3–3	(Italy) Internazionale	Barcelona, Spain
21:00 CEST (UTC+2)	Yamal 24'; Torres 38'; Sommer 65' (o.g.); Cubarsí (yellow card) 70'	Report	Thuram 1'; Dumfries 21', 64'; Çalhanoğlu (yellow card) 59'	Stadium: Estadi Olímpic Lluís Companys; Attendance: 50,314; Referee: Clément Turpin (France)
Note: The match was played at the Estadi Olímpic Lluís Companys in Barcelona, instead of Barcelona's regular stadium, the Camp Nou, which was being renovated.

6 May 2025 Second leg	Internazionale (Italy)	4–3 (a.e.t.) (7–6 agg.)	(Spain) Barcelona	Milan, Italy
21:00 CEST (UTC+2)	L. Martínez 21'; Çalhanoğlu (yellow card) 36', (goal) 45+1' (pen.); Mkhitaryan (yellow card) 68'; Acerbi 90+3', (yellow card) 90+5'; Carlos Augusto (yellow card) 91'; Frattesi 99'; Bastoni (yellow card) 118'	Report	Martínez (yellow card) 51'; García 54'; Olmo 60'; Raphinha 87'; Víctor (yellow card) 90+5'	Stadium: San Siro; Attendance: 75,504; Referee: Szymon Marciniak (Poland)

===== Final =====
31 May 2025 Final	Paris Saint-Germain (France)	5–0	(Italy) Internazionale	Munich, Germany
21:00 CEST (UTC+2)	Hakimi 12', (yellow card) 90'; Doué 20', 63', (yellow card) 65'; Kvaratskhelia 73'; Mayulu 86'	Report	Zalewski (yellow card) 56'; Thuram (yellow card) 69'; Acerbi (yellow card) 71'	Stadium: Allianz Arena; Attendance: 64,327; Referee: István Kovács (Romania)

=== FIFA Club World Cup ===
==== Group stage ====
The group stage draw took place on 5 December 2024.

Pos	Team	Pld	W	D	L	GF	GA	GD	Pts	Qualification
1	(Italy) Inter Milan	3	2	1	0	5	2	+3	7	Advance to knockout stage
2	(Mexico) Monterrey	3	1	2	0	5	1	+4	5	Advance to knockout stage
3	(Argentina) River Plate	3	1	1	1	3	3	0	4	
4	(Japan) Urawa Red Diamonds	3	0	0	3	2	9	−7	0	

Source: FIFA
Rules for classification: Group stage tiebreakers

17 June 2025 1	Monterrey (Mexico)	1–1	(Italy) Internazionale	Pasadena, United States
18:00 PDT (UTC−7)	Ramos 25'; Rodríguez (yellow card) 45'	Report	L. Martínez 42', (yellow card) 90+5'; Asllani (yellow card) 61'; Barella (yellow card) 88'	Stadium: Rose Bowl; Attendance: 40,311; Referee: Wilton Sampaio (Brazil)

21 June 2025 2	Internazionale (Italy)	2–1	(Japan) Urawa Red Diamonds	Seattle, United States
12:00 PDT (UTC−7)	L. Martínez 78'; Carboni 90+2'	Report	Watanabe 11'; Nishikawa (yellow card) 61'; Sekine (yellow card) 67'; Santana (yellow card) 80'	Stadium: Lumen Field; Attendance: 25,090; Referee: Dahane Beida (Mauritania)

25 June 2025 3	Internazionale (Italy)	2–0	(Argentina) River Plate	Seattle, United States
18:00 PDT (UTC−7)	Bastoni (yellow card) 30', (goal) 90+3'; F. Esposito 72'; Carlos Augusto (yellow card) 77'; S. Esposito (yellow card) 85'; Dumfries (yellow card) 90+4'	Report	Montiel (yellow card) 22' (yellow-red card) 90+5'; Martínez Quarta (red card) 65'; Lanzini (yellow card) 77'; Díaz (yellow card) 88'	Stadium: Lumen Field; Attendance: 45,135; Referee: Ilgiz Tantashev (Uzbekistan)

==== Knockout stage ====
30 June 2025 Round of 16	Internazionale (Italy)	0–2	(Brazil) Fluminense	Charlotte, United States
15:00 EDT (UTC−4)	Asllani (yellow card) 8'; Bastoni (yellow card) 38'	Report	Cano 3', (yellow card) 16'; Freytes (yellow card) 26'; Renê (yellow card) 35'; Thiago Santos (yellow card) 85'; Hércules 90+3'	Stadium: Bank of America Stadium; Attendance: 20,030; Referee: Iván Barton (El Salvador)

== Statistics ==
=== Appearances and goals ===
No.	Pos	Nat	Player	Total		Serie A		Coppa Italia		Supercoppa Italiana		Champions League		Club World Cup	
No.	Pos	Nat	Player	Apps	Goals	Apps	Goals	Apps	Goals	Apps	Goals	Apps	Goals	Apps	Goals
Goalkeepers
1	GK	(Switzerland) SUI	Yann Sommer	53	0	33	0	0	0	2	0	14	0	4	0
12	GK	(Italy) ITA	Raffaele Di Gennaro	0	0	0	0	0	0	0	0	0	0	0	0
13	GK	(Spain) ESP	Josep Martínez	10	0	5	0	4	0	0	0	1	0	0	0
Defenders
2	DF	(Netherlands) NED	Denzel Dumfries	47	11	20+9	7	0+2	0	2	2	11+1	2	2	0
6	DF	(Netherlands) NED	Stefan de Vrij	43	3	18+8	3	3	0	2	0	8+1	0	2+1	0
15	DF	(Italy) ITA	Francesco Acerbi	35	1	20+3	0	0+1	0	0	0	8+1	1	2	0
28	DF	(France) FRA	Benjamin Pavard	38	1	18+5	0	1+1	0	0	0	11+1	1	1	0
30	DF	(Brazil) BRA	Carlos Augusto	50	3	15+14	3	2	0	0+2	0	6+7	0	2+2	0
31	DF	(Germany) GER	Yann Aurel Bisseck	46	3	17+10	3	4	0	2	0	7+6	0	0	0
32	DF	(Italy) ITA	Federico Dimarco	52	4	29+5	4	2	0	2	0	7+3	0	3+1	0
36	DF	(Italy) ITA	Matteo Darmian	49	3	20+9	3	4	0	0+2	0	5+5	0	4	0
42	DF	(Argentina) ARG	Tomás Palacios	3	0	0+2	0	0+1	0	0	0	0	0	0	0
50	DF	(Italy) ITA	Mike Aidoo	1	0	0	0	0+1	0	0	0	0	0	0	0
58	DF	(Italy) ITA	Matteo Cocchi	1	0	0	0	0	0	0	0	0+1	0	0	0
95	DF	(Italy) ITA	Alessandro Bastoni	57	2	31+2	1	3+1	0	2	0	12+2	0	3+1	1
Midfielders
7	MF	(Poland) POL	Piotr Zieliński	39	2	8+18	2	2	0	0+1	0	6+4	0	0	0
8	MF	(Croatia) CRO	Petar Sučić	4	0	0	0	0	0	0	0	0	0	0+4	0
11	MF	(Brazil) BRA	Luis Henrique	3	0	0	0	0	0	0	0	0	0	1+2	0
16	MF	(Italy) ITA	Davide Frattesi	47	7	9+19	5	3+1	0	0+2	0	4+9	2	0	0
20	MF	(Turkey) TUR	Hakan Çalhanoğlu	47	11	26+3	5	1+3	2	2	0	11+1	4	0	0
21	MF	(Albania) ALB	Kristjan Asllani	39	3	10+12	2	3	1	0+2	0	3+5	0	4	0
22	MF	(Armenia) ARM	Henrikh Mkhitaryan	53	1	30+2	1	1+1	0	2	0	10+3	0	3+1	0
23	MF	(Italy) ITA	Nicolò Barella	56	3	29+5	3	2+1	0	2	0	11+2	0	4	0
45	MF	(Argentina) ARG	Valentín Carboni	3	1	0	0	0	0	0	0	0	0	0+3	1
52	MF	(Italy) ITA	Thomas Berenbruch	2	0	0	0	0+1	0	0	0	0+1	0	0	0
53	MF	(Slovenia) SLO	Luka Topalović	1	0	0+1	0	0	0	0	0	0	0	0	0
59	MF	(Poland) POL	Nicola Zalewski	17	1	4+7	1	0+2	0	0	0	0+2	0	1+1	0
Forwards
8	FW	(Austria) AUT	Marko Arnautović	28	7	5+13	4	2+1	2	0	0	2+5	1	0	0
9	FW	(France) FRA	Marcus Thuram	50	18	27+5	14	1	0	1	0	11+3	4	1+1	0
10	FW	(Argentina) ARG	Lautaro Martínez	53	24	31	12	1+1	0	2	1	10+4	9	4	2
49	FW	(Italy) ITA	Giacomo De Pieri	1	0	0	0	0	0	0	0	0+1	0	0	0
70	FW	(Italy) ITA	Sebastiano Esposito	4	0	0	0	0	0	0	0	0	0	2+2	0
94	FW	(Italy) ITA	Francesco Pio Esposito	2	1	0	0	0	0	0	0	0	0	1+1	1
99	FW	(Iran) IRI	Mehdi Taremi	43	3	7+19	1	3	0	1+1	1	7+5	1	0	0
Players loaned out during the season
11	FW	(Argentina) ARG	Joaquín Correa	22	2	6+13	2	1+2	0	0	0	0	0	0	0
17	MF	(Canada) CAN	Tajon Buchanan	7	0	0+6	0	1	0	0	0	0	0	0	0

Source: Competitions

=== Goalscorers ===
Rank	No.	Pos.	Player	Serie A	Coppa Italia	Supercoppa Italiana	Champions League	Club World Cup	Total
1	10	FW	(Argentina) Lautaro Martínez	12	0	1	9	2	24
2	9	FW	(France) Marcus Thuram	14	0	0	4	0	18
3	2	DF	(Netherlands) Denzel Dumfries	7	0	2	2	0	11
3	20	MF	(Turkey) Hakan Çalhanoğlu	5	2	0	4	0	11
5	8	FW	(Austria) Marko Arnautović	4	2	0	1	0	7
5	16	MF	(Italy) Davide Frattesi	5	0	0	2	0	7
7	32	DF	(Italy) Federico Dimarco	4	0	0	0	0	4
8	6	DF	(Netherlands) Stefan de Vrij	3	0	0	0	0	3
8	21	MF	(Albania) Kristjan Asllani	2	1	0	0	0	3
8	23	MF	(Italy) Nicolò Barella	3	0	0	0	0	3
8	30	DF	(Brazil) Carlos Augusto	3	0	0	0	0	3
8	31	DF	(Germany) Yann Aurel Bisseck	3	0	0	0	0	3
8	36	DF	(Italy) Matteo Darmian	3	0	0	0	0	3
8	99	FW	(Iran) Mehdi Taremi	1	0	1	1	0	3
15	7	MF	(Poland) Piotr Zieliński	2	0	0	0	0	2
15	11	FW	(Argentina) Joaquín Correa	2	0	0	0	0	2
15	95	DF	(Italy) Alessandro Bastoni	1	0	0	0	1	2
18	15	DF	(Italy) Francesco Acerbi	0	0	0	1	0	1
18	22	MF	(Armenia) Henrikh Mkhitaryan	1	0	0	0	0	1
18	28	DF	(France) Benjamin Pavard	0	0	0	1	0	1
18	45	MF	(Argentina) Valentín Carboni	0	0	0	0	1	1
18	59	MF	(Poland) Nicola Zalewski	1	0	0	0	0	1
18	94	FW	(Italy) Francesco Pio Esposito	0	0	0	0	1	1
Own goals				3	0	0	1	0	4
Totals				79	5	4	26	5	119

=== Assists ===
Rank	No.	Pos.	Player	Serie A	Coppa Italia	Supercoppa Italiana	Champions League	Club World Cup	Total
1	23	MF	(Italy) Nicolò Barella	6	0	0	2	1	9
2	20	MF	(Turkey) Hakan Çalhanoğlu	6	0	0	2	0	8
2	32	DF	(Italy) Federico Dimarco	7	0	0	1	0	8
4	99	FW	(Iran) Mehdi Taremi	2	1	1	3	0	7
5	95	DF	(Italy) Alessandro Bastoni	5	0	0	1	0	6
6	2	DF	(Netherlands) Denzel Dumfries	2	0	0	3	0	5
6	9	FW	(France) Marcus Thuram	4	0	0	1	0	5
6	30	DF	(Brazil) Carlos Augusto	2	0	0	2	1	5
9	22	MF	(Armenia) Henrikh Mkhitaryan	4	0	0	0	0	4
10	7	MF	(Poland) Piotr Zieliński	2	0	0	1	0	3
10	10	FW	(Argentina) Lautaro Martínez	3	0	0	0	0	3
10	11	FW	(Argentina) Joaquín Correa	2	1	0	0	0	3
13	8	FW	(Austria) Marko Arnautović	2	0	0	0	0	2
13	15	DF	(Italy) Francesco Acerbi	1	0	0	1	0	2
13	21	MF	(Albania) Kristjan Asllani	2	0	0	0	0	2
13	31	DF	(Germany) Yann Aurel Bisseck	2	0	0	0	0	2
13	36	DF	(Italy) Matteo Darmian	2	0	0	0	0	2
18	6	DF	(Netherlands) Stefan de Vrij	0	0	1	0	0	1
18	8	MF	(Croatia) Petar Sučić	0	0	0	0	1	1
18	16	MF	(Italy) Davide Frattesi	1	0	0	0	0	1
18	28	DF	(France) Benjamin Pavard	1	0	0	0	0	1
18	59	MF	(Poland) Nicola Zalewski	1	0	0	0	0	1
18	94	FW	(Italy) Francesco Pio Esposito	0	0	0	0	1	1
Totals				56	2	2	17	4	82

=== Hat-tricks ===
Player	Opponents	Result	Date	Competition
(France) Marcus Thuram	Torino (H)	3–2	5 October 2024	Serie A
(Argentina) Lautaro Martínez	(France) Monaco (H)	3–0	29 January 2025	Champions League

=== Clean sheets ===
Rank	No.	Player	Serie A	Coppa Italia	Supercoppa Italiana	Champions League	Club World Cup	Total
1	1	(Switzerland) Yann Sommer	13	0	1	7	1	22
2	13	(Spain) Josep Martínez	3	2	0	1	0	6
Totals			16	2	1	8	1	28

=== Disciplinary record ===
No.	Pos.	Player	Serie A			Coppa Italia			Supercoppa Italiana			Champions League			Club World Cup			Total		
No.	Pos.	Player	Yellow card	(yellow card) (yellow-red card)	Red card	Yellow card	(yellow card) (yellow-red card)	Red card	Yellow card	(yellow card) (yellow-red card)	Red card	Yellow card	(yellow card) (yellow-red card)	Red card	Yellow card	(yellow card) (yellow-red card)	Red card	Yellow card	(yellow card) (yellow-red card)	Red card
2	DF	(Netherlands) Denzel Dumfries	4	0	0	1	0	0	1	0	0	2	0	0	1	0	0	10	0	0
6	DF	(Netherlands) Stefan de Vrij	2	0	0	0	0	0	0	0	0	1	0	0	0	0	0	3	0	0
8	FW	(Austria) Marko Arnautović	1	0	0	0	0	0	0	0	0	2	0	0	0	0	0	3	0	0
9	FW	(France) Marcus Thuram	1	0	0	0	0	0	0	0	0	1	0	0	0	0	0	2	0	0
10	FW	(Argentina) Lautaro Martínez	1	0	0	0	0	0	0	0	0	2	0	0	1	0	0	4	0	0
11	FW	(Argentina) Joaquín Correa	3	0	0	0	0	0	0	0	0	0	0	0	0	0	0	3	0	0
15	DF	(Italy) Francesco Acerbi	0	0	0	1	0	0	0	0	0	1	0	0	0	0	0	2	0	0
16	MF	(Italy) Davide Frattesi	1	0	0	0	0	0	0	0	0	1	0	0	0	0	0	2	0	0
20	MF	(Turkey) Hakan Çalhanoğlu	5	0	0	1	0	0	0	0	0	3	0	0	0	0	0	9	0	0
21	MF	(Albania) Kristjan Asllani	4	0	0	2	0	0	0	0	0	3	0	0	2	0	0	11	0	0
22	MF	(Armenia) Henrikh Mkhitaryan	4	0	0	0	0	0	1	0	0	3	0	0	0	0	0	8	0	0
23	MF	(Italy) Nicolò Barella	4	0	0	0	0	0	1	0	0	2	0	0	1	0	0	8	0	0
28	DF	(France) Benjamin Pavard	4	0	0	0	0	0	0	0	0	2	0	0	0	0	0	6	0	0
30	DF	(Brazil) Carlos Augusto	1	0	0	0	0	0	1	0	0	2	0	0	1	0	0	5	0	0
31	DF	(Germany) Yann Aurel Bisseck	4	0	0	1	0	0	0	0	0	0	0	0	0	0	0	5	0	0
32	DF	(Italy) Federico Dimarco	3	0	0	0	0	0	0	0	0	1	0	0	0	0	0	4	0	0
36	DF	(Italy) Matteo Darmian	3	0	0	0	0	0	0	0	0	0	0	0	0	0	0	3	0	0
59	MF	(Poland) Nicola Zalewski	3	0	0	0	0	0	0	0	0	1	0	0	0	0	0	4	0	0
70	FW	(Italy) Sebastiano Esposito	0	0	0	0	0	0	0	0	0	0	0	0	1	0	0	1	0	0
95	DF	(Italy) Alessandro Bastoni	4	1	0	0	0	0	1	0	0	3	0	0	2	0	0	9	1	0
99	FW	(Iran) Mehdi Taremi	1	0	0	0	0	0	0	0	0	0	0	0	0	0	0	1	0	0
Totals			53	1	0	6	0	0	5	0	0	30	0	0	9	0	0	103	1	0

== Awards ==
=== Monthly awards ===
Serie A Player of the Month

Month	Winner	Ref.
August	(France) Marcus Thuram	

Serie A Coach of the Month

Month	Winner	Ref.
December	(Italy) Simone Inzaghi	

Serie A Goal of the Month

Month	Winner	Opponents	Date	Ref.
August	(Italy) Nicolò Barella	Atalanta	30 August 2024	

Pirelli Player of the Month

Awarded by an online supporters vote on Inter's social media accounts.

Month	Winner	Ref.
August	(France) Marcus Thuram	
September	(Italy) Federico Dimarco	
October	(France) Marcus Thuram	
November	(Turkey) Hakan Çalhanoğlu	
December	(Italy) Nicolò Barella	
January	(Argentina) Lautaro Martínez	
February	(Italy) Nicolò Barella	
March	(Italy) Alessandro Bastoni	
April	(Argentina) Lautaro Martínez	

Betsson Sport Goal of the Month

Awarded by an online supporters vote on Inter's social media accounts.

Month	Winner	Opponents	Date	Competition	Ref.
August	(Italy) Nicolò Barella	Atalanta	30 August 2024	Serie A	
September	(Argentina) Lautaro Martínez	Udinese	28 September 2024	Serie A	
October	(Turkey) Hakan Çalhanoğlu	(Serbia) Red Star Belgrade	1 October 2024	Champions League	
November	(Turkey) Hakan Çalhanoğlu	Napoli	10 November 2024	Serie A	
December	(Italy) Nicolò Barella	Lazio	16 December 2024	Serie A	
January	(Argentina) Lautaro Martínez	(Czech Republic) Sparta Prague	22 January 2025	Champions League	
February	(Austria) Marko Arnautović	Lazio	25 February 2025	Coppa Italia	
March	(Italy) Federico Dimarco	Napoli	1 March 2025	Serie A	
April	(Germany) Yann Aurel Bisseck	Cagliari	12 April 2025	Serie A	

=== Seasonal awards ===
Serie A Awards

Award	Winner	Ref.
Best Defender	(Italy) Alessandro Bastoni	
