= Vasilios Mantzis =

Greek footballer

Vasilis Mantzis
Personal information
- Full name: Vasilios Efrem Mantzis
- Date of birth: 4 December 1991 (age 34)
- Place of birth: Grammatiko, Attica, Greece
- Height: 1.81 m (5 ft 11 in)
- Position: Striker

Team information
- Current team: Niki Volos
- Number: 9

Youth career
- AO Ramnous Grammatikou

Senior career*
Years	Team	Apps	(Gls)
2012–2015	Triglia Rafinas	92	(30)
2015–2017	Kissamikos	63	(11)
2017–2020	Volos	68	(32)
2020–2021	Olympiakos Nicosia	48	(13)
2022–2023	Ionikos	50	(15)
2023–2024	Asteras Tripolis	30	(2)
2024–2025	PAS Giannina	23	(8)
2025–2026	Kalamata	18	(10)
2026–	Niki Volos	0	(0)
- * Club domestic league appearances and goals as of 29 March 2026

Vasilios Mantzis (Greek: Βασίλειος Μάντζης; born 4 December 1991) is a Greek professional footballer who plays as a striker for Super League 2 club Niki Volos.

== Honours ==
Volos

- Gamma Ethniki: 2017–18
- Football League: 2018–19

Kalamata

- Super League 2: 2025–26
- Super League 2 Super Cup: 2025–26
