= Alex Perez =

Alex Perez may refer to:

- Álex Pérez (footballer, born 1985), Spanish football midfielder
- Álex Pérez (footballer, born 1991), Spanish football defender
- Álex Pérez (footballer, born 2006), Spanish football defender
- Alex Perez (fighter) (born 1992), American mixed martial artist
- Alex Pérez (basketball) (born 1993), American basketball player
- Alex Perez, actor who appeared in season 11 of Modern Family

== See also ==
- Alix Perez, Belgian DJ and producer
