= Tomás Palacios (footballer) =

Argentine footballer

Personal information
- Full name: Tiago Tomás Palacios
- Date of birth: 28 April 2003 (age 23)
- Place of birth: General Pico, La Pampa, Argentina
- Height: 1.96 m (6 ft 5 in)
- Position: Centre-back

Team information
- Current team: Estudiantes (LP) (on loan from Inter Milan)
- Number: 24

Youth career
- 2016–2019: Costa Brava
- 2019–2022: Talleres

Senior career*
Years	Team	Apps	(Gls)
2022–2024	Talleres	4	(0)
2024	→ Independiente Rivadavia (loan)	9	(0)
2024–	Inter Milan	2	(0)
2025	→ Monza (loan)	8	(0)
2026–	→ Estudiantes (LP) (loan)	21	(2)

International career^{‡}
2022	Argentina U20	5	(0)
2026–	Argentina	1	(0)
- * Club domestic league appearances and goals as of 17:34, 21 November 2026 (UTC) ‡ National team caps and goals as of 3 October 2026

Tiago Tomás Palacios (born 28 April 2003) is an Argentine professional footballer who plays as a centre-back for Argentine Primera División club Estudiantes, on loan from Serie A club Inter Milan, and the Argentina national team.

== Club career ==
=== Early career ===
Born in General Pico, Palacios started his career playing for his hometown team Club Atlético Costa Brava, before joining the youth academy of Talleres in 2019.

=== Talleres ===
Palacios trained with the main squad of Talleres for the first time in September 2020, and signed his first professional contract with the club on 14 November 2021, agreeing to a deal until 2025. On 9 April 2022, he made his professional debut in a 5–1 loss against Defensa y Justicia in a Copa de la Liga Profesional match. He only played in one further match for the club during the season.

In 2023, Palacios was again a backup option at Talleres, and featured in only six matches during the entire year.

==== Loan to Independiente Rivadavia ====
On 6 January 2024, Palacios joined fellow Primera División side Independiente Rivadavia on a year-long loan. Initially a backup option, he made his debut for the club on 24 February, starting in a 4–1 away loss to Unión de Santa Fe.

Palacios subsequently established himself as a starter, and had his loan cut short in August after 16 appearances.

=== Inter Milan ===
On 30 August 2024, Palacios completed his move to Inter Milan for a reported fee of €6.5 million plus €4.5 million of bonuses to be equally shared between Talleres and Independiente Rivadavia, signing a five-year contract with the Serie A side. He made his debut for the club on 30 October, coming on as an 81st-minute substitute for Stefan de Vrij in a 3–0 league win against Empoli.

==== Loan to Monza ====
On 29 January 2025, Palacios joined Monza on loan until the end of the 2024–25 Serie A season. He featured in eight matches for the side (all defeats), being unable to avoid team relegation.

==== Loan to Estudiantes (LP) ====
On 27 January 2026, Palacios returned to his home country and joined to Estudiantes (LP) on a year-long loan.

== International career ==
Palacios was an Argentina youth international, with five caps with the under-20 squad.

On 18 March 2026, Palacios received his first senior national team call-up.

Palacios made his debut for Argentina national team on 3 October 2026 in a friendly against Burkina Faso.

== Career statistics ==
As of match played 23 March 2026

Appearances and goals by club, season and competition
Club	Season	League			National cup (Note: Includes Copa Argentina, Coppa Italia)		League cup (Note: Includes Copa de la Liga Profesional)		Continental		Other		Total	
Club	Season	Division	Apps	Goals	Apps	Goals	Apps	Goals	Apps	Goals	Apps	Goals	Apps	Goals
Talleres	2022	Argentine Primera División	0	0	0	0	2	0	0	0	—		2	0
Talleres	2023	Argentine Primera División	4	0	1	0	1	0	—		—		6	0
Talleres	Total		4	0	1	0	3	0	0	0	—		8	0
Independiente Rivadavia (loan)	2024	Argentine Primera División	9	0	1	0	6	0	—		—		16	0
Inter Milan	2024–25	Serie A	2	0	1	0	—		0	0	0	0	3	0
Monza (loan)	2024–25	Serie A	8	0	—		—		—		—		8	0
Estudiantes (loan)	2026	Argentine Primera División	9	0	0	0	—		0	0	—		9	0
Career total			32	0	3	0	9	0	0	0	0	0	44	0

== Honours ==
Estudiantes

- Supercopa Argentina: 2025
