= Nicola Zalewski =

Polish footballer (born 2002)

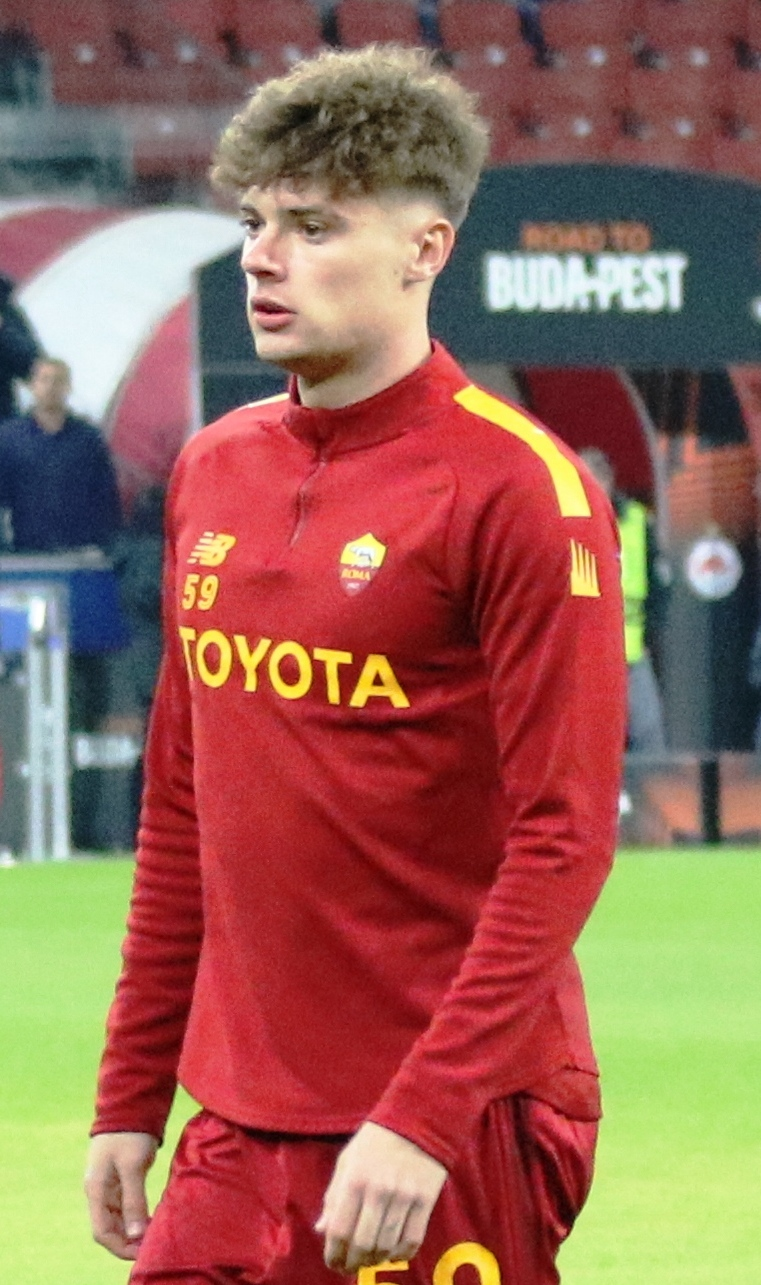
- Zalewski with Roma in 2023

Personal information
- Full name: Nicola Zalewski
- Date of birth: 23 January 2002 (age 24)
- Place of birth: Tivoli, Italy
- Height: 1.75 m (5 ft 9 in)
- Positions: Wing-back; attacking midfielder

Team information
- Current team: Atalanta
- Number: 59

Youth career
- 2011–2021: Roma

Senior career*
Years	Team	Apps	(Gls)
2021–2025	Roma	84	(2)
2025	→ Inter Milan (loan)	11	(1)
2025	Inter Milan	0	(0)
2025–	Atalanta	43	(3)

International career^{‡}
2017–2018	Poland U16	5	(0)
2018–2019	Poland U17	9	(2)
2019	Poland U19	7	(0)
2019	Poland U20	1	(0)
2021–2023	Poland U21	6	(1)
2021–	Poland	42	(4)
- * Club domestic league appearances and goals as of 23:00, 22 November 2026 (UTC) ‡ National team caps and goals as of 23:23, 17 November 2026 (UTC)

Nicola Zalewski (born 23 January 2002) is a professional footballer who plays as a wing-back or attacking midfielder for Serie A club Atalanta. Born in Italy, he represents the Poland national team.

== Club career ==
=== Roma ===
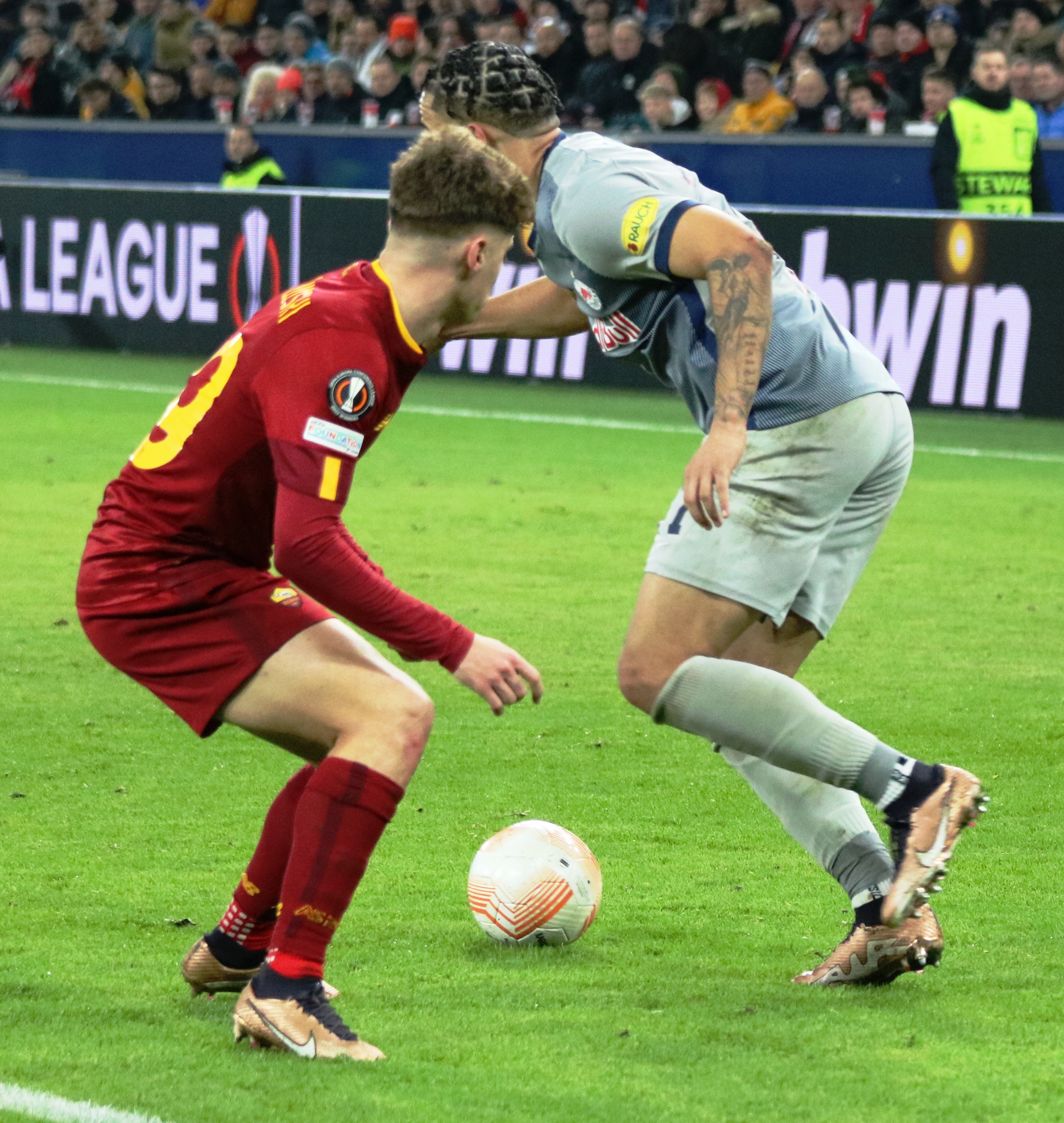
Zalewski (left) playing for Roma against Red Bull Salzburg during a UEFA Europa League match in 2023

Zalewski made his professional debut for Roma on 6 May 2021 in the Europa League semi-final against Manchester United, replacing Pedro at the 76th minute and being instrumental to the winning goal, an own goal by Alex Telles, seven minutes later. He made his Serie A debut three days later, on 9 May, during a home game against Crotone. On 29 December, Roma announced his contract had been extended until 2025. On 28 February 2022, he first played as a starter for Roma in their 1–0 win against Spezia.

On 12 March 2023, he scored the first goal in his senior career in a 3–4 loss against Sassuolo Calcio. On 3 June, Zalewski scored a goal in a 2–1 victory over Spezia.

On 12 December 2024, Zalewski played the full 90 minutes and registered an assist in a Europa League group stage match against Braga, which concluded in Roma's 3–0 victory.

=== Inter Milan ===
On 1 February 2025, Zalewski joined fellow Serie A team Inter Milan on loan, with an option to make the deal permanent at the end of the season. The initial loan was reported to be a fee of €600,000, with the buy option at €6.5m. The following day, Zalewski made his debut for the club in the Milan derby, coming on as a substitute for Federico Dimarco in the 76th minute. He later assisted Stefan de Vrij’s equaliser in stoppage time. Zalewski scored his first goal for Inter in an away match against Torino on 11 May 2025 which Inter won 2–0. Zalewski's goal was the opening goal of that match.

On 23 June 2025, Inter exercised their option to buy Zalewski, effectively making the transfer permanent.

=== Atalanta ===
On 18 August 2025, Zalewski signed a four-year contract with Serie A club Atalanta, joining the team for a reported transfer fee of €17 million. On 14 September, Zalewski scored his first goal in Atalanta colours, with a right footed shot from outside the box in the 70th minute. He also assisted teammate Giorgio Scalvini earlier in the match. However, just one week later against Torino, Zalewski was forced off by an injury in the 10th minute, being replaced by Raoul Bellanova.

== International career ==
Zalewski was born in Italy but has never applied for Italian citizenship, having an unlimited right to live and work in Italy in virtue of his EU citizenship. He was first selected by the youth selections of the Poland national team after being discovered by Zbigniew Boniek, head of the Polish Football Association and former Roma player. He made his debut for the senior team on 5 September 2021, in the World Cup Qualifier against San Marino where he came on in 66th minute and assisted Adam Buksa in the 94th minute who made it 7–1 for Poland.

On 7 June 2024, Zalewski was called up for UEFA Euro 2024. Three days later, he scored his first goal for Poland in a friendly against Turkey, dribbling down from the wing past two defenders and hitting a strike inside the box in the 90th minute to set the final score to 2–1.

On 5 September 2024, Zalewski scored a last-minute penalty against Scotland in the group stage of the UEFA Nations League to win the game 3–2 in Poland's favour. The following month, he also scored in a 3–3 draw against Croatia in the same competition.

== Personal life ==
Zalewski was born in Tivoli to Polish parents and grew up in Poli. He has a sister, Jessica, born in 1992. His father, Krzysztof Zalewski, died of cancer on 24 September 2021.

== Career statistics ==
=== Club ===
As of match played 22 November 2026

Appearances and goals by club, season and competition
Club	Season	League			Coppa Italia		Europe		Other		Total	
Club	Season	Division	Apps	Goals	Apps	Goals	Apps	Goals	Apps	Goals	Apps	Goals
Roma	2020–21	Serie A	1	0	0	0	1 (Note: Appearance(s) in UEFA Europa League)	0	—		2	0
Roma	2021–22	Serie A	16	0	1	0	7 (Note: Appearances in UEFA Europa Conference League)	0	—		24	0
Roma	2022–23	Serie A	33	2	2	0	12	0	—		47	2
Roma	2023–24	Serie A	22	0	2	0	9	0	—		33	0
Roma	2024–25	Serie A	12	0	1	0	4	0	—		17	0
Roma	Total		84	2	6	0	33	0	—		123	2
Inter Milan (loan)	2024–25	Serie A	11	1	2	0	2 (Note: Appearances in UEFA Champions League)	0	2 (Note: Appearances in FIFA Club World Cup)	0	17	1
Atalanta	2025–26	Serie A	33	2	3	0	6	0	—		42	2
Atalanta	2026–27	Serie A	10	1	0	0	5	0	—		15	1
Atalanta	Total		43	3	3	0	11	0	—		57	3
Career total			138	6	11	0	46	0	2	0	197	6

=== International ===
As of match played 17 November 2026

Appearances and goals by national team and year
National team	Year	Apps	Goals
Poland	2021	1	0
Poland	2022	8	0
Poland	2023	5	0
Poland	2024	13	3
Poland	2025	6	0
Poland	2026	9	1
Total		42	4

Scores and results list Poland's goal tally first, score column indicates score after each Zalewski goal.

List of international goals scored by Nicola Zalewski
No.	Date	Venue	Cap	Opponent	Score	Result	Competition
1	10 June 2024	Stadion Narodowy, Warsaw, Poland	18	Turkey	2–1	2–1	Friendly
2	5 September 2024	Hampden Park, Glasgow, Scotland	22	Scotland	3–2	3–2	2024–25 UEFA Nations League A
3	15 October 2024	Stadion Narodowy, Warsaw, Poland	25	Croatia	2–3	3–3	2024–25 UEFA Nations League A
4	31 March 2026	Nationalarenan, Solna, Sweden	34	Sweden	1–1	2–3	2026 FIFA World Cup qualification

== Honours ==
Roma

- UEFA Europa Conference League: 2021–22

Inter Milan

- UEFA Champions League runner-up: 2024–25
- Supercoppa Italiana runner-up: 2024–25

Individual

- Polish Newcomer of the Year: 2022
- Golden Boy Web: 2022
