= Kalamata F.C. =

Association football club in Greece

Kalamata
- Full name: Ποδοσφαιρικός Σύλλογος «η Καλαμάτα»; (Football Club "Kalamata")
- Nickname: Μαύρη Θύελλα (Black Storm)
- Founded: 1967; 59 years ago
- Ground: Kalamata Municipal Stadium
- Capacity: 4,496
- Owner: George Prassas
- Chairman: George Prassas
- Manager: Panagiotis Christofileas
- League: Super League Greece
- 2025–26: Super League Greece 2, 1st (promoted)
- Website: www.fckalamata.gr
Home colours	Away colours	Third colours

Football Club "Kalamata" (Greek: Ποδοσφαιρικός Σύλλογος «η Καλαμάτα») is a Greek professional football club based in Kalamata, Messenia. They compete in the Super League Greece, after being promoted in the 2025–26 season, for the first time in 25 years. The club's home ground is the Kalamata Municipal Stadium.

== Creation and early years ==
Kalamata F.C. was formed in 1967 when local teams Apollon Kalamata FC and Kalamata Sports Club were forced to merge by the Greek Junta. The Phoenix, which was the emblem of the dictatorship, was chosen as the team's crest and was removed after the Greek restoration of democracy in 1974.

== History ==
The team has competed in the Greek first division seven times, in 1972–73, 1974–75, from 1995–96 to 1997–98, and from 1999–2000 to 2000–01.

Kalamata F.C. achieved its first two promotions to the first division, in 1972 and 1974, under President Lykourgos Gaitanaros. Its first two promotions in the early 1970s are considered the team's first golden era. The team could not stick in the top flight though, and would not have a resurgence until the 1990s.

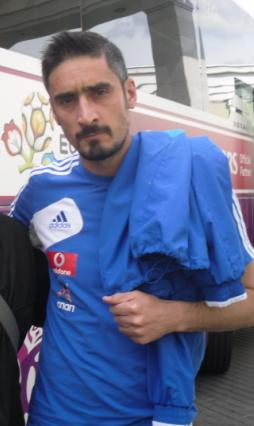
Nikos Liberopoulos

Businessman Stavros Papadopoulos bought the team in 1992, while the club was stuck in Gamma Ethniki, the third division. Upon his arrival, Papadopoulos began pouring a substantial amount of money into the club, and by 1995 the team had achieved promotion to the first division. The team dropped back to the second division for one season in 1998, but again achieved promotion to the first division the very next year, and remained in the top flight until Papadopoulos sold the team in 2000. After Papadopoulos' departure Kalamata fell to the second division and has since stayed in the lower divisions.

The Papadopoulos era of Kalamata F.C. saw the signing of many international players from Ghana, such as Samuel Johnson, Afo Dodoo, Ebenezer Hagan, Peter Ofori-Quaye and Derek Boateng. Johnson later transferred from Kalamata to Anderlecht and later played for Fenerbahçe, Hagan transferred to Iraklis and then to PAOK, Ofori-Quaye was sold for a club record US$3.5 million to Olympiacos, and Derek Boateng left for Panathinaikos. Kalamata FC is credited with starting the trend among Greek clubs of signing African talent since the late 1990s. The Papadopoulos era also saw the uncovering of a wealth of young Greek talent, including Greek international player Nikos Liberopoulos, who made his name at Kalamata before moving to Panathinaikos, and from there to AEK and Eintracht Frankfurt.

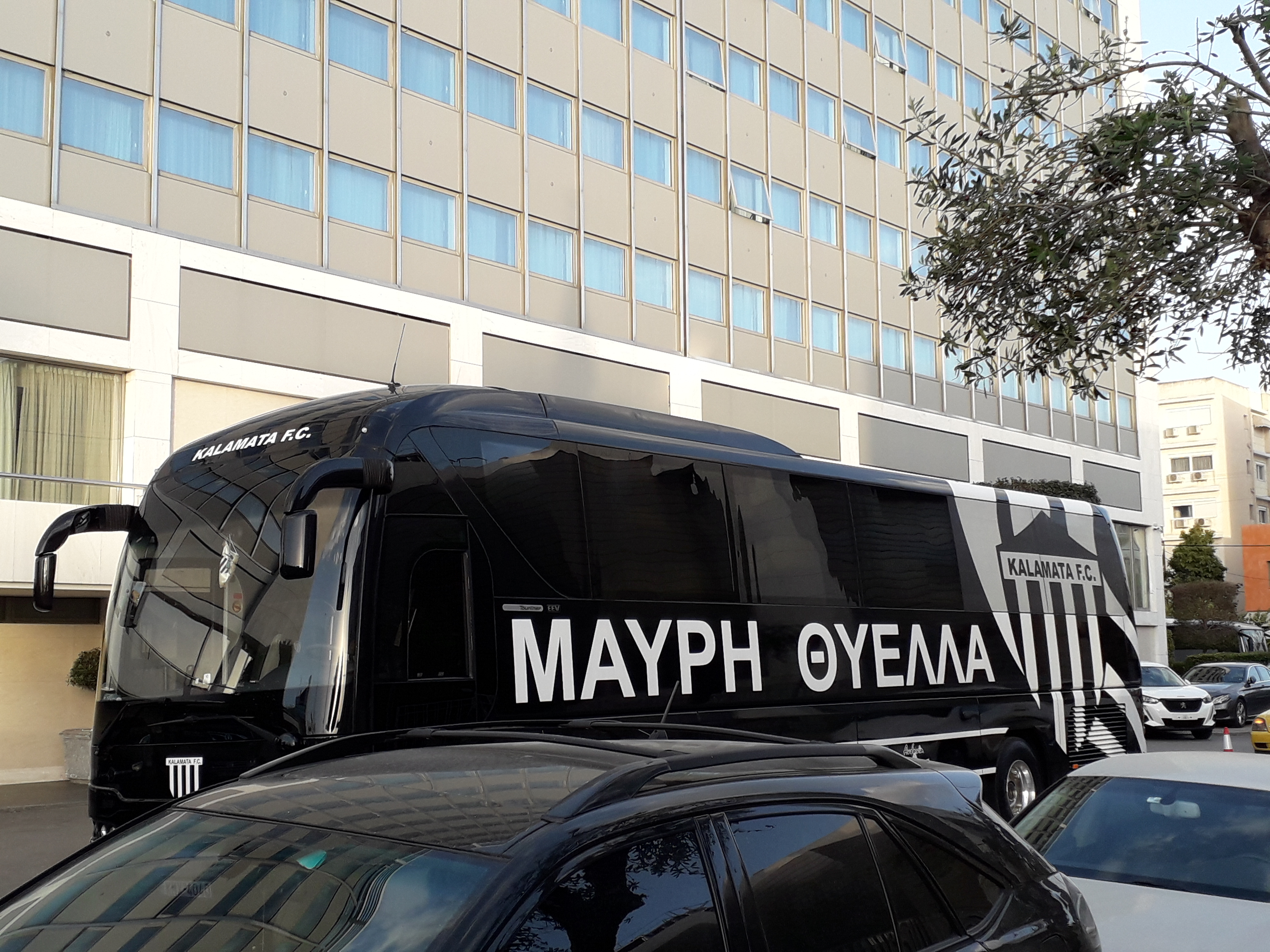
Kalamata FC team bus

After being demoted to the second division in 1997, they eventually started to bring in young Brazilian talent, as well as some veterans of the biggest teams in Brazil. The Brazilians helped the team gain promotion to the first division right away in 1998. According to Brazilian media and insiders, Papadopoulos' son Daniil, a former high level amateur athlete in America, was supposedly instrumental in spotting some of the Brazilian talent and sending them to Kalamata FC. One of them, Hilton Assis (1999-2000), turned out to be the first cousin of Brazil and Barcelona FC super star Ronaldinho. Hilton was once a promising player in Brazil who starred for Internacional of Porto Alegre, but serious knee operations curtailed his career. When he was healthy he was Kalamata's top goal scorer, but he returned to the Brazilian first division after Papadopoulos sold the team.

Kalamata's long-standing rivals are Paniliakos and Egaleo.

== Crest and colours ==
Former crest of Kalamata F.C.

Kalamata F.C.'s official colours are black and white, and the team is known in Greece as the "Black Storm" (Μαύρη Θύελλα).

== Stadium ==
Kalamata plays its home matches at Kalamata Metropolitan Stadium in Kalamata. The stadium was completed in 1976, and currently has a seating capacity of 4.496.

== Supporters ==
Kalamata F.C.'s most famous supporters' club is the "Bulldogs Fan Club".

=== Rivals ===
Kalamata's long-standing rivals are Paniliakos, located in Pyrgos in the western Peloponnese, and Egaleo, in Athens suburb of Egaleo. Messiniakos is Kalamata's cross-town rival, but Messiniakos generally competed in lower leagues.

== Sponsors ==
As for the 2025–26 the main sponsor of the team is the online gambling website Novibet.gr and the kit provider is Macron.

== Players ==
=== Current squad ===
As of 9 September 2026

Note: Flags indicate national team as defined under FIFA eligibility rules; some limited exceptions apply. Players may hold more than one non-FIFA nationality.

No.	Pos.	Nation	Player
1	GK	GRE	Ioannis Gelios
3	DF	ESP	Álex Pérez
4	DF	GRE	Stefanos Stroungis
5	MF	ESP	Aarón Martín
6	MF	SEN	Djibril Diarra
7	MF	ARG	Juan Cataldi
8	MF	GRE	Argyris Liatsikouras (on loan from Olympiacos B)
9	FW	VEN	Jovanny Bolívar (on loan from Albacete)
10	MF	ISL	Arnór Sigurðsson
11	MF	GEQ	Josete Miranda
12	DF	GRE	Ilias Chatzitheodoridis
14	MF	CIV	Ben Zidane
16	MF	GHA	Eugene Frimpong
17	DF	ESP	Julio Alonso
18	DF	GRE	Panagiotis Panagiotou
19	DF	FRA	Messemo Bakayoko
20	MF	GUI	Ahmad Mendes Moreira

No.	Pos.	Nation	Player
21	MF	COL	Marcelino Carreazo
22	DF	GRE	Petros Kaloutsikidis
23	MF	ARG	Gonzalo Piñeiro (on loan from Estudiantes de La Plata)
24	MF	GRE	Erik Hamza (on loan from Olympiacos B)
26	GK	GRE	Panagiotis Ginis
29	DF	SRB	Uros Ignjatović
32	MF	ARG	Julián Bonetto
40	GK	SRB	Nikola Vasiljević
42	DF	GRE	Dimitrios Naoumis
44	DF	FRA	Axel Guessand
64	FW	GRE	Savvas Mouzakis
70	GK	GRE	Pavlos Varelas
77	MF	CRC	Kenneth Vargas (on loan from Hearts)
91	FW	POL	Dawid Kurminowski
97	DF	BRA	Rodrigues
99	FW	GRE	Stavros Angelis

== Honours ==
=== Domestic ===
==== League titles ====
- Second Division
  - Winners (3): 1971–72 (Group 1), 1973–74 (Group 2), 2025–26
- Third Division
  - Winners (1): 2020–21 (South Group)
- Fourth Division
  - Winners (2): 1984–85, 2010–11

==== Cups ====
- Super League Greece 2 Super Cup
  - Winners (1): 2025–26

=== Regional ===
==== League titles ====
- Messinia FCA Championship
  - Winners (2): 1980−81, 2016−17

==== Cups ====
- Messinia FCA Cup
  - Winners (4): 1953−54, 1982−83, 2016−17, 2017−18

== League participation ==
- First Division (8): 1972–1973, 1974–1975, 1995–1998, 1999–2001, 2026–
- Second Division (20): 1967–1972, 1973–1974, 1975–1977, 1993–1995, 1998–1999, 2001–2010, 2021–2026
- Third Division (21): 1977–1980, 1981–1982, 1985–1993, 2011–2016, 2017–2021
- Fourth Division (4): 1982–1985, 2010–2011
- Messinia FCA Championship (2): 1980–1981, 2016–2017

== European matches ==
Season	Competition	Round	Club	Home	Away
2000	UEFA Intertoto Cup	3rd Round	(Czech Republic) FK Chmel Blšany	0−3	0–5

== Notable Former Managers ==
- (Sweden) Bo Petersson (1995–97)
- (Brazil) Eduardo Amorim (1997–98)
- (Greece) Andreas Michalopoulos (2003–04)

== Notable former players ==
Greece

- (Greece) Panagiotis Drougas
- (Greece) Nikos Georgeas
- (Greece) Nikos Liberopoulos
- (Greece) Sotiris Liberopoulos
- (Greece) Thomas Troupkos
- (Greece) Kostas Frantzeskos
- (Greece) Fanouris Goundoulakis
- (Greece) Aristeidis Galanopoulos
- (Greece) Christos Kalantzis
- (Greece) Thanasis Kostoulas
- (Greece) Sokratis Kopsachilis
- (Greece) Ilias Anastasakos
- (Greece) Vangelis Kaounos
- (Greece) Alekos Dedes
- (Greece) Thanasis Sentementes
- (Greece) Panagiotis Bachramis
- (Greece) Giorgos Bistikeas
- (Greece) Vaggelis Koutsoures
- (Greece) Christos Kelpekis
- (Greece) Kyriakos Stamatopoulos
- (Greece) Dimitrios Konstantopoulos
- (Greece) Nikos Zapropoulos
- (Greece) Christos Mikes
- (Greece) Vasilios Georgopoulos
- (Greece) Makis Belevonis
- (Greece) Dimitris Markos
- (Greece) Lysandros Georgamlis
- (Greece) Antonis Mavreas
- (Greece) Dimitris Spetzopoulos

Ghana

- (Ghana) Samuel Johnson
- (Ghana) Peter Ofori-Quaye
- (Ghana) Ebenezer Hagan
- (Ghana) Derek Boateng
- (Ghana) Afo Dodoo

Argentina

- (Argentina) Elvio Mana
- (Argentina) Sergio Espinoza
- (Argentina) Raul Valian
- (Argentina) Luis Kadijevic
- (Argentina) Armando Gigliotti

Brazil

- (Brazil) Alessandro Soares
- (Brazil) Jeronimo Hilton
- (Brazil) Sandro Luiz Scapin

Albania

- (Albania) Arjan Xhumba
- (Albania) Arjan Bellaj

Uruguay

- (Uruguay) Carlos Marcora

Serbia

- (Serbia) Ivan Tasic

Spain

- (Spain) José Cañas

Sweden

- (Sweden) Peter Larsson
