= Petros Kaloutsikidis =

Greek football player

Personal information
- Date of birth: 28 March 2001 (age 25)
- Place of birth: Thessaloniki, Greece
- Height: 1.80 m (5 ft 11 in)
- Position: Right-back

Team information
- Current team: Kalamata
- Number: 22

Youth career
- 2016–2021: PAOK

Senior career*
Years	Team	Apps	(Gls)
2021	PAOK	0	(0)
2021	→ Niki Volos (loan)	14	(0)
2021–2022	PAOK B	20	(0)
2022–2024	AEL	48	(1)
2024–2025	Iraklis	25	(0)
2025–	Kalamata	28	(1)
- * Club domestic league appearances and goals as of 20 September 2026

Petros Kaloutsikidis (Greek: Πέτρος Καλουτσικίδης; born 28 March 2001) is a Greek professional footballer who plays as a right-back for Super League club Kalamata.

== Career statistics ==
=== Club ===
As of 2 April 2026

Club	Season	League			Cup		Continental		Other		Total	
Club	Season	Division	Apps	Goals	Apps	Goals	Apps	Goals	Apps	Goals	Apps	Goals
Niki Volos (loan)	2020–21	Football League	14	0	0	0	—		—		14	0
PAOK B	2021–22	Super League Greece 2	20	1	—		—		—		20	1
AEL	2022–23	Super League Greece 2	22	1	2	0	—		—		24	1
AEL	2023–24	Super League Greece 2	26	0	1	0	—		—		27	0
AEL	Total		48	1	3	0	—		—		51	1
Iraklis	2024–25	Superleague Greece 2	25	0	2	0	—		—		27	0
Kalamata	2025–26	Superleague Greece 2	24	1	0	0	—		—		24	1
Career total			131	2	5	0	0	0	0	0	136	2
