= Super League Greece 2 Super Cup =

Football competition

- Organiser(s): A2 National Division Professional Football Association
- Founded: 2024; 2 years ago
- Abolished: 2026; 0 years ago
- Region: Greece
- Teams: 2
- Related competitions: Super League Greece 2
- Last champions: Kalamata
- Broadcaster: Action 24
- Website: sl2.gr
- 2025–26 Super League Greece 2 Super Cup

The Super League Greece 2 Super Cup (Greek: Σουπερλίγκ 2 Σούπερ Καπ), was a Greek association football one-match competition, which was contested annually between the champions of the two Super League Greece 2 group winners which won the promotion on Super League Greece.

With the unification of the two groups into one for the 2026–27 season, the Super Cup competition was abolished.

== Finals ==
Year	Champion	Score	Champion	Venue
2024–25	AEL	1–0	AE Kifisia	AEL FC Arena, Larissa
2025–26	Kalamata	1–0	Iraklis	Athens Olympic Stadium, Athens
