= Enoch Owusu =

Italian footballer (born 2005)

Personal information
- Date of birth: 8 January 2005 (age 21)
- Place of birth: Bergamo, Italy
- Height: 1.84 m (6 ft 0 in)
- Position: Forward

Team information
- Current team: St. Gallen
- Number: 47

Youth career
- –2024: Inter Milan

Senior career*
Years	Team	Apps	(Gls)
2024–2025	Inter Milan	0	(0)
2024–2025	→ Novara (loan)	4	(0)
2025	→ St. Gallen U21 (loan)	13	(3)
2025–	St. Gallen	12	(4)
2025–	St. Gallen U21	1	(0)

International career^{‡}
2021	Italy U17	2	(0)
2022	Italy U18	5	(1)
- * Club domestic league appearances and goals as of 28 September 2026 ‡ National team caps and goals as of 20 November 2022

Enoch Owusu (born 8 January 2005) is an Italian professional footballer who plays as a forward for Swiss Super League club St. Gallen.

== Club career ==
Owusu started his career in the youth sector of Inter Milan.

On 30 August 2024, Owusu made his first professional move, joining Serie C club Novara on a season-long loan. However, his stint with the Piedmontese side was cut short on 3 February 2025, after making just four appearances and spending much of the first half of the season out of the squad list. On 7 February 2025, Owusu joined Swiss Super League club St. Gallen on loan for the remainder of the season, where he was assigned to the under-21 team. On 21 May 2025, St. Gallen officially exercised their option to buy, making the transfer permanent.

== International career ==
Born in Bergamo, Italy to Ghanaian parents, Owusu represented Italy as a youth international.
