= Antonis Anastasiou =

Greek association football player (born 1996)

Personal information
- Full name: Antonios Anastasiou
- Date of birth: 13 September 1996 (age 30)
- Place of birth: Athens, Greece
- Height: 1.70 m (5 ft 7 in)
- Position: Left-back

Team information
- Current team: Athens Kallithea
- Number: 12

Youth career
- 2013–2015: PAOK

Senior career*
Years	Team	Apps	(Gls)
2015–2017	Acharnaikos	34	(1)
2017–2019	Kerkyra	18	(0)
2019–2020	Doxa Drama	6	(0)
2020–2022	Egaleo	44	(0)
2022–2024	Niki Volos	42	(0)
2024–2026	Iraklis	43	(1)
2026–	Athens Kallithea	3	(0)

International career^{‡}
2017	Greece U21	1	(0)
- * Club domestic league appearances and goals as of September 20, 2026 ‡ National team caps and goals as of December 20, 2017

Antonis Anastasiou (Greek: Αντώνης Αναστασίου; born 13 September 1996) is a Greek professional association football player who plays as a left-back for Super League 2 club Athens Kallithea.

== Career statistics ==
=== Club ===
As of 26 March 2026

Club	Season	League			Cup		Continental		Other		Total	
Club	Season	Division	Apps	Goals	Apps	Goals	Apps	Goals	Apps	Goals	Apps	Goals
Acharnaikos	2015–16	Superleague Greece 2	10	0	1	0	—		—		11	0
Acharnaikos	2016–17	Superleague Greece 2	24	1	2	0	—		—		26	1
Acharnaikos	Total		34	1	3	0	—		—		37	1
Kerkyra	2017–18	Superleague Greece	8	0	3	0	—		—		11	0
Kerkyra	2018–19	Superleague Greece 2	10	0	2	0	—		—		12	0
Kerkyra	Total		18	0	5	0	—		—		23	0
Doxa Drama	2020–21	Superleague Greece 2	6	0	0	0	—		—		6	0
Egaleo	2020–21	Football League	16	0	0	0	—		—		16	0
Egaleo	2021–22	Superleague Greece 2	28	0	2	0	—		—		30	0
Egaleo	Total		44	0	2	0	—		—		46	0
Niki Volos	2022–23	Superleague Greece 2	18	0	2	0	—		—		20	0
Niki Volos	2023–24	Superleague Greece 2	24	0	6	0	—		—		30	0
Niki Volos	Total		42	0	8	0	—		—		50	0
Iraklis	2024–25	Superleague Greece 2	24	1	1	0	—		—		25	1
Iraklis	2025–26	Superleague Greece 2	19	0	3	0	—		—		22	0
Iraklis	Total		43	1	4	0	—		—		47	1
Career total			186	2	22	0	0	0	0	0	208	2
