= Álex Pérez (footballer, born 2006) =

Spanish footballer

Personal information
- Full name: Alejandro Pérez Adam
- Date of birth: 10 May 2006 (age 20)
- Place of birth: Madrid, Spain
- Height: 1.93 m (6 ft 4 in)
- Position: Centre-back

Team information
- Current team: Kalamata
- Number: 3

Youth career
- –2022: Rayo Vallecano
- 2022–2024: Betis
- 2024–2025: → Inter Milan (loan)
- 2025–2026: → Torino (loan)

Senior career*
Years	Team	Apps	(Gls)
2024–2026	Betis B	7	(1)
2024–2025	→ Inter Milan (loan)	0	(0)
2026–	Kalamata	0	(0)
- * Club domestic league appearances and goals as of 3 March 2024

Alejandro "Álex" Pérez Adam (born 10 May 2006) is a Spanish professional footballer who plays as a centre-back for Super League Greece club Kalamata.

== Club career ==
Pérez started his career with Rayo Vallecano before joining the youth academy of Real Betis in the summer of 2022.

On 13 January 2024, Pérez made his senior debut for Betis reserve team in a 1–1 draw against Cádiz Mirandilla. On 28 January 2024, Pérez scored his first goal, the equaliser in a 1–1 draw against Racing Cartagena MM.

On 19 July 2024, Pérez joined Serie A club Inter Milan on a season-long loan with an option to buy for a reported fee of €500,000. He was assigned to the under-20 squad.

On 6 July 2026, Pérez signed for Greek side Kalamata on a free transfer.

== Personal life ==
Pérez was born in Madrid to a Spanish father and a Mozambican mother.

== Career statistics ==
As of match played 3 March 2024

Appearances and goals by club, season and competition
Club	Season	League			Cup		Europe		Other		Total	
Club	Season	Division	Apps	Goals	Apps	Goals	Apps	Goals	Apps	Goals	Apps	Goals
Betis Deportivo	2023–24	Segunda Federación	7	1	–		–		0	0	7	1
Career total			7	1	0	0	0	0	0	0	7	1
