= 2025–26 Alcione Milano season =

Italian association football club season

Alcione Milano
2025–26 season
- Manager: Giovanni Cusatis
- Stadium: Stadio Ernesto Breda
- Serie C: 10th
- Coppa Italia Serie C: Second round
Home colours	Away colours

The 2025–26 season is the 74th in the history of Alcione Milano Società Sportiva and the club’s second consecutive season in Serie C. In addition to the domestic league, Alcione Milano competes in the Coppa Italia Serie C. The season began on 17 August 2025.

== Squad ==
=== Transfers In ===
Pos.	Player	Transferred from	Fee	Date	Source
DF	(Italy) Giulio Scuderi	(Italy) Fiorentina U20	Loan	8 July 2025	
FW	(France) Jonathan Pitou	(Italy) Pro Patria	Undisclosed	15 July 2025	
MF	(France) Emerick Lopes	(Italy) Sassuolo U20	Loan	16 July 2025	
MF	(Italy) Mattia Muroni	(Italy) Mantova	Undisclosed	23 July 2025	
FW	(Italy) Luca Zamparo	(Italy) Vicenza	Loan	30 July 2025	
DF	(Italy) Simone Giorgeschi	(Italy) Spezia	Loan	1 September 2025	

=== Transfers Out ===
Pos.	Player	Transferred to	Fee	Date	Source
DF	(Italy) Christian Dimarco	(Italy) Pro Patria	Undisclosed	28 August 2025	

== Friendlies ==
25 July 2025	Reggiana	2–0	Alcione Milano

29 July 2025	Monza	2–0	Alcione Milano

== Competitions ==
=== Overall record ===
Competition	First match	Last match	Starting round	Record							
Competition	First match	Last match	Starting round	Pld	W	D	L	GF	GA	GD	Win %
Serie C	23 August 2025	26 April 2026	Matchday 1	5	2	2	1	4	3	+1	40.00
Coppa Italia Serie C	17 August 2025		First round	1	0	1	0	1	1	+0	0.00
Total				6	2	3	1	5	4	+1	33.33

Last updated: 21 September 2025
Source: Competitions

=== Serie C ===
Group A

==== Results summary ====
Overall								Home						Away					
Pld	W	D	L	GF	GA	GD	Pts	W	D	L	GF	GA	GD	W	D	L	GF	GA	GD
5	2	2	1	4	3	+1	8	2	1	0	3	1	+2	0	1	1	1	2	−1

Last updated: 21 September 2025.

==== Results by round ====
Round	1	2	3	4	5	6
Ground	H	A	H	A	H	A
Result	W	L	W	D	D	
Position	6	10				

Updated to match(es) played on 21 September 2025. Source:
A = Away; H = Home; W = Win; D = Draw; L = Loss

==== Matches ====
The competition draw was held on 28 July 2025.

23 August 2025 1	Alcione Milano	1–0	Triestina	Sesto San Giovanni
18:00 UTC+2	Pitou 13'			Stadium: Stadio Ernesto Breda; Referee: Davide Galiffi

29 August 2025 2	Cittadella	1–0	Alcione Milano	Cittadella
21:00 UTC+2	Gaddini 65'			Stadium: Stadio Pier Cesare Tombolato; Attendance: 2,227; Referee: Domenico Leone

6 September 2025 3	Alcione Milano	1–0	Lumezzane	Sesto San Giovanni
15:00 UTC+2	Pirola 5'			Stadium: Stadio Ernesto Breda; Referee: Andrea Palmieri

13 September 2025 4	Dolomiti Bellunesi	1–1	Alcione Milano	Fontanafredda
15:00 UTC+2				Stadium: Stadio Omero Tognon; Referee: Lorenzo Massari

21 September 2025 5	Alcione Milano	1–1	Renate	Sesto San Giovanni
12:30 UTC+2	Morselli 67'		Delcarro 19'	Stadium: Stadio Ernesto Breda; Referee: Dario Acquafredda

25 September 2025 6	Arzignano Valchiampo	v	Alcione Milano	Arzignano
18:30 UTC+2				Stadium: Stadio Tommaso Dal Molin

=== Coppa Italia Serie C ===
17 August 2025 First round	Pro Patria	1–1 (1–4 p)	Alcione Milano	Busto Arsizio
18:00 UTC+2	Ferri 77'		Ciappellano 61'	Stadium: Stadio Carlo Speroni; Referee: Deborah Bianchi

28–30 October 2025 Second round	Atalanta U23	v	Alcione Milano
