= 2025–26 Serie C =

Serie C
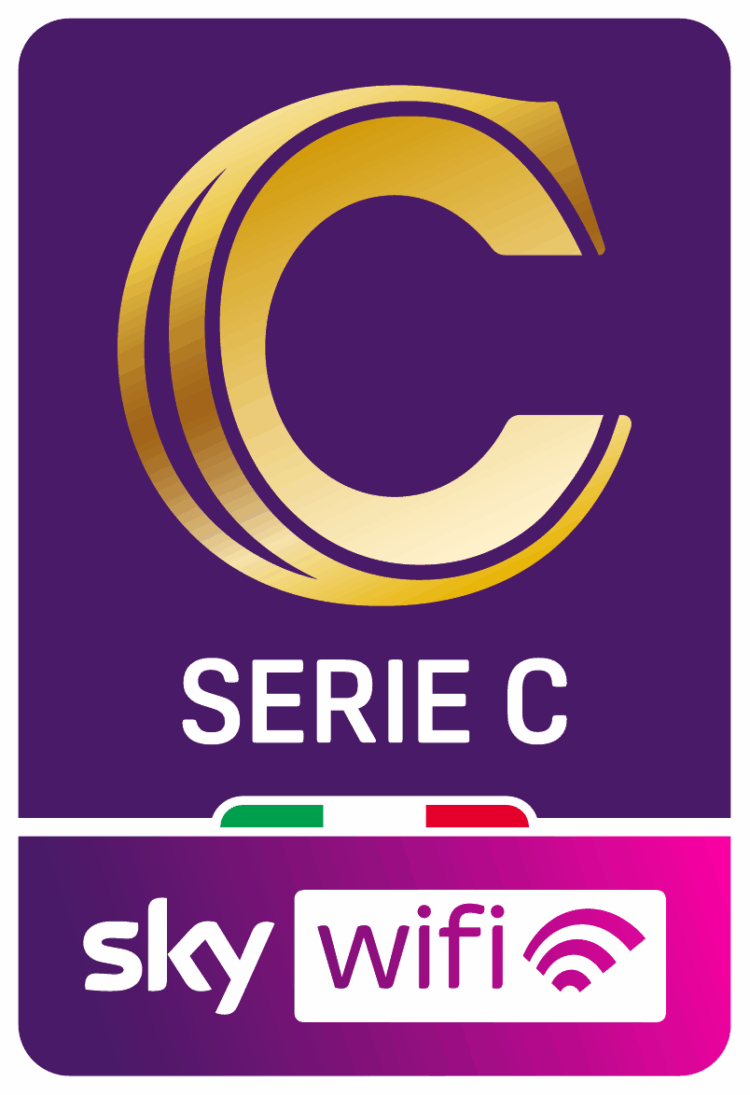
- Season: 2025–26
- Dates: Regular season: 24 August 2025 – 26 April 2026; Play-offs: 3 May 2026 – 7 June 2026
- Promoted: Vicenza; Arezzo; Benevento; Ascoli (via play-off)
- Relegated: Virtus Verona; Pro Patria; Triestina; Bra; Pontedera; Rimini (excluded); Foggia; Siracusa; Trapani
- Matches: 1,066
- Top goalscorer: Cosimo Chiricò (18)
- All statistics correct as of 7 June 2026.

The 2025–26 Serie C, officially known as Serie C Sky Wifi for sponsorship, was the twelfth season of the unified Serie C division, the third tier of the Italian football league system.

== Changes ==
The league will be composed of 60 teams, geographically divided into three groups. The group composition will be decided and formalized by the Serie C league committee between July and August. Inter Milan have shown interest in adding their U23 team, but the change requires the approval of the league and an available spot, whereas Lucchese opted not to apply for a league spot instead.

The following teams have changed divisions since the 2024–25 season:

=== To Serie C ===
Relegated from Serie B

- Salernitana, after 10 years of absence
- Brescia (excluded)
- Cittadella, after 9 years of absence
- Cosenza, after 7 years of absence

Promoted from Serie D

- Bra (Group A winners) after 77 years of absence
- Ospitaletto (Group B winners) after 30 years of absence
- Dolomiti Bellunesi (Group C winners) first time in history
- Forlì (Group D winners) after 7 years of absence
- Livorno (Group E winners) after 4years of absence
- Sambenedettese (Group F winners) after 4 years of absence
- Guidonia Montecelio (Group G winners) after 1 year of absence
- Casarano (Group H winners)after 27 years of absence
- Siracusa (Group I winners) after 6 years of absence
- Ravenna (Wild-card as play-off winners) after 4 years of absence

=== From Serie C ===
Promoted to Serie B

- Padova (Group A winners)
- Virtus Entella (Group B winners)
- Avellino (Group C winners)
- Pescara (Play-off winners)

Relegated to Serie D

- Union Clodiense Chioggia
- Caldiero Terme
- Milan Futuro
- Lucchese (folded)
- Sestri Levante
- Legnago Salus
- Messina
- Turris (retired)
- Taranto (retired)
- SPAL (excluded)

According to the Italian Football Federation regulations, retired and folded clubs are included and counted among the ordinary seasonal relegations, while excluded clubs must be replaced, in order:

- by a Serie A reserve team;
- by a Serie D playoff winner.

Between June and July 2025, Brescia and SPAL's applications were rejected by the COVISOC (the Italian Football Federation's office responsible for evaluating the financial state of professional clubs). As a consequence, it was widely expected Inter Milan's Under-23 team and Ravenna to be admitted to the league.

Also, on 17 July 2025, Feralpisalò chairman and owner Giuseppe Pasini formally confirmed his club would rename to Union Brescia and relocate to the city of Brescia.

On 24 July 2025, the Serie C Federal Council ratified the exclusion of Lucchese, SPAL, and Brescia, approved the reinstatement of Pro Patria, and confirmed the admission of Inter Milan Under-23 and Ravenna.

On 28 November 2025, the Italian Football Federation formally excluded Rimini from the league with immediate effect following the club's liquidation.

== Group A (North) ==
=== Stadia and locations ===
11 teams from Lombardy, 5 teams from Veneto, 2 teams from Piedmont, 1 team from Friuli-Venezia Giulia and 1 team from Trentino-Alto Adige/Südtirol.

Location of teams in 2025–26 Serie C (Group A)
Location of teams in 2025–26 Serie C (Group A) (Lombardy)

Club	City	Stadium	Capacity
AlbinoLeffe	Albino and Leffe	AlbinoLeffe Stadium (Zanica)	1,791
Alcione Milano	Milan	Ernesto Breda (Sesto San Giovanni)	3,523
Arzignano Valchiampo	Arzignano	Tommaso Dal Molin	1,690
Cittadella	Cittadella	Piercesare Tombolato	7,623
Dolomiti Bellunesi	Belluno, Feltre and Sedico	Omero Tognon (Fontanafredda)	3,295
Giana Erminio	Gorgonzola	Città di Gorgonzola	3,766
Inter Milan U23	Milan	Brianteo (Monza)	17,102
Lecco	Lecco	Rigamonti-Ceppi	5,508
Lumezzane	Lumezzane	Tullio Saleri	4,150
Novara	Novara	Silvio Piola (Novara)	17,875
Ospitaletto	Ospitaletto	Comunale Gino Corioni	9,000
Pergolettese	Crema	Giuseppe Voltini	4,095
Pro Patria	Busto Arsizio	Carlo Speroni	5,000
Pro Vercelli	Vercelli	Silvio Piola (Vercelli)	5,526
Renate	Renate	Mino Favini (Meda)	2,500
Trento	Trento	Briamasco	3,000
Triestina	Trieste	Nereo Rocco	26,566
Union Brescia	Brescia	Mario Rigamonti	19,550
Vicenza	Vicenza	Romeo Menti	17,163
Virtus Verona	Verona	Gavagnin-Nocini	1,500

=== Personnel and sponsors ===
Club	Manager	Captain	Kit maker	Shirt sponsor(s)
Club	Manager	Captain	Kit maker	Main
AlbinoLeffe	(Italy) Giovanni Lopez	(Italy) Simone Potop	Acerbis	Isocell
Alcione Milano	(Italy) Giovanni Cusatis	(Italy) Giorgio Galli	Adidas	Banca del Fucino
Arzignano Valchiampo	(Italy) Giuseppe Bianchini	(Italy) Andrea Boffelli	Jako	C.G.R.D. Chemicals
Cittadella	(Italy) Manuel Iori	(Italy) Alessio Vita	Erreà	Sirmax
Dolomiti Bellunesi	(Italy) Andrea Bonatti	(Italy) Salvatore Burrai	Adidas	Sportful
Giana Erminio	(Dominican Republic) Vinicio Espinal	(Italy) Daniele Pinto	Macron	Bamonte
Inter Milan U23	(Italy) Stefano Vecchi	(Italy) Giuseppe Prestia	Nike	Betsson.sport
Lecco	(Italy) Federico Valente	(Italy) Matteo Battistini	Legea	Cantine Pirovano
Lumezzane	(Italy) Emanuele Troise	(Italy) Cesare Pogliano	Acerbis	Camozzi
Novara	(Italy) Andrea Zanchetta	(Italy) Davide Bertoncini	Erreà	Igor Gorgonzola
Ospitaletto	(Italy) Andrea Quaresmini	(Italy) Michel Panatti	Acerbis	Nova Sider Forgital
Pergolettese	(Italy) Giacomo Curioni	(Italy) Mariano Arini	Joma	Bowling Pegaso
Pro Patria	(Italy) Leandro Greco	(Italy) Davide Ferri	Macron	Hupac
Pro Vercelli	(Italy) Michele Santoni	(Italy) Gianmario Comi	Fourteen	None
Renate	(Italy) Luciano Foschi	(Italy) Simone Auriletto	Kappa	Yale Lift Truck Technologies
Trento	(Italy) Luca Tabbiani	(Italy) Andrea Trainotti	Acerbis	Trentino
Triestina	(Italy) Geppino Marino	(Moldova) Artur Ioniță	Kappa	None
Union Brescia	(Italy) Aimo Diana	(Italy) Davide Balestrero	In-house	A2A
Vicenza	(Italy) Fabio Gallo	(Italy) Filippo Costa	Hummel	Diesel
Virtus Verona	(Italy) Luigi Fresco	(Italy) Leonardo Zarpellon	Erreà	Argosped (Home) / VivColor (Away)

=== Table ===
Pos	Team	Pld	W	D	L	GF	GA	GD	Pts	Promotion, qualification or relegation
1	Vicenza (C, P)	38	27	8	3	69	26	+43	89	Promotion to Serie B and qualification for Supercoppa di Serie C
2	Union Brescia	38	19	12	7	49	24	+25	69	Qualification for the national play-offs second round
3	Renate	38	17	13	8	53	37	+16	64	Qualification for the national play-offs first round
4	Lecco	38	18	10	10	47	34	+13	64	Qualification for the group play-offs second round
5	Trento	38	16	15	7	58	42	+16	63	Qualification for the group play-offs first round
6	Cittadella	38	17	8	13	45	43	+2	59	Qualification for the group play-offs first round
7	Lumezzane	38	14	14	10	46	39	+7	56	Qualification for the group play-offs first round
8	Alcione Milano	38	15	10	13	35	28	+7	55	Qualification for the group play-offs first round
9	Arzignano	38	15	8	15	50	48	+2	53	Qualification for the group play-offs first round
10	Giana Erminio	38	14	10	14	38	39	−1	52	Qualification for the group play-offs first round
11	AlbinoLeffe	38	13	11	14	51	49	+2	50	
12	Inter Milan U23	38	12	12	14	40	41	−1	48	
13	Novara	38	9	20	9	40	39	+1	47	
14	Pro Vercelli	38	13	7	18	39	55	−16	46	
15	Ospitaletto	38	10	15	13	41	43	−2	45	
16	Pergolettese	38	10	11	17	37	50	−13	41	
17	Dolomiti Bellunesi	38	10	10	18	38	61	−23	40	
18	Virtus Verona (Note: Automatically relegated for having more than eight points of distance from 16th-placed team Pergolettese.) (R)	38	3	16	19	34	62	−28	25	Relegation to Serie D
19	Pro Patria (Note: Automatically relegated for having more than eight points of distance from 17th-placed team Dolomiti Bellunesi.) (R)	38	4	11	23	34	70	−36	23	Relegation to Serie D
20	Triestina (Note: Triestina were deducted 23 points due to administrative irregularities.) (R)	38	9	9	20	45	59	−14	13	Relegation to Serie D

Source: Lega Pro, Soccerway (in English)
Rules for classification: 1) Points; 2) Head-to-head points; 3) Head-to-head goal difference; 4) Goal difference; 5) Goals scored; 6) Lower goals against; 7) Wins; 8) Lower losses; 9) Away wins; 10) Lower home losses.
(Note: Head-to-head record is used only after all the matches between the teams in question have been played)
(C) Champions; (P) Promoted; (R) Relegated

=== Results ===
Home \ Away	ALB	ALC	ARZ	CIT	DOB	GIA	INT	LEC	LUM	NOV	OSP	PER	PPA	PVE	REN	TRE	TRI	UBR	VIC	VVE
AlbinoLeffe	—	2–0	2–0	2–1	2–2	0–1	1–3	0–1	0–1	3–2	1–1	3–0	2–2	2–1	2–3	1–2	3–0	1–0	0–1	3–1
Alcione Milano	2–1	—	1–0	2–0	5–0	1–1	1–2	0–2	1–0	0–1	0–0	1–0	2–0	1–1	1–1	2–0	1–0	0–0	0–1	0–1
Arzignano	0–0	1–3	—	1–0	2–2	0–0	1–1	0–1	3–3	1–1	1–2	1–0	2–1	3–0	0–0	0–2	4–1	1–2	1–2	3–2
Cittadella	0–1	1–0	1–0	—	2–1	0–2	1–1	2–1	0–1	2–2	2–2	3–3	0–0	2–1	2–1	1–3	1–0	1–1	0–1	4–1
Dolomiti Bellunesi	2–0	1–1	1–2	0–1	—	0–0	1–0	1–4	2–0	1–1	4–1	1–2	2–4	1–2	0–3	0–0	1–0	0–1	1–2	1–0
Giana Erminio	1–1	1–1	2–1	0–2	1–1	—	2–0	0–1	2–1	0–0	1–0	2–0	2–1	1–0	0–1	0–2	2–1	0–2	1–3	1–3
Inter Milan U23	0–1	0–0	0–1	0–1	1–2	0–1	—	0–1	0–0	0–0	2–2	1–1	2–2	1–1	1–1	2–1	2–0	0–1	1–2	1–0
Lecco	0–0	1–0	5–1	0–1	3–0	0–0	0–2	—	2–2	0–0	2–1	1–0	1–0	0–2	0–3	3–1	1–0	0–1	2–0	2–2
Lumezzane	1–1	1–0	0–1	1–2	3–0	1–0	1–2	1–1	—	1–1	2–0	2–3	1–0	3–1	0–0	1–1	1–2	1–0	1–1	4–1
Novara	2–2	3–0	1–0	0–1	1–1	3–1	1–1	1–0	1–3	—	0–3	1–1	3–1	0–1	0–1	1–1	0–0	0–0	2–2	1–1
Ospitaletto	3–0	0–1	2–1	1–2	3–1	3–2	2–2	1–1	1–2	0–2	—	1–2	0–0	2–0	1–1	3–2	1–0	0–0	0–0	1–1
Pergolettese	0–0	0–2	0–1	3–1	1–2	0–3	0–2	3–0	0–2	2–2	1–0	—	2–1	2–1	0–1	1–2	2–0	2–1	0–1	2–2
Pro Patria	0–3	1–1	2–3	1–0	0–2	0–4	1–2	1–4	1–1	0–0	0–0	3–1	—	2–3	0–3	2–2	1–1	0–2	0–4	2–2
Pro Vercelli	2–1	1–0	0–5	0–2	4–0	0–0	0–2	0–1	1–1	1–0	1–0	2–0	1–0	—	1–1	1–3	3–1	0–0	1–2	0–2
Renate	1–1	1–0	1–2	0–0	2–0	1–1	2–1	0–1	0–0	3–1	1–2	2–1	2–1	2–1	—	1–1	4–0	1–3	1–3	1–0
Trento	2–2	1–0	2–2	1–0	2–0	3–1	0–1	1–1	1–1	1–1	3–1	0–0	2–0	1–0	3–3	—	2–2	0–2	1–1	1–0
Triestina	5–2	1–2	2–1	2–3	2–3	2–0	4–1	1–1	2–1	0–1	1–1	1–1	2–1	2–3	3–0	1–1	—	0–1	1–6	5–0
Union Brescia	2–1	0–1	1–2	2–1	2–0	2–0	2–0	3–1	0–1	1–1	0–0	0–0	3–2	5–0	1–2	2–1	0–0	—	1–1	3–1
Vicenza	3–1	0–1	2–1	4–1	0–0	2–1	2–1	1–0	5–0	3–1	1–0	0–0	3–0	2–0	1–0	2–3	1–0	1–1	—	2–1
Virtus Verona	1–3	1–1	0–1	1–1	1–1	0–1	1–2	2–2	0–0	0–2	0–0	1–1	0–1	2–2	2–2	0–3	0–0	1–1	0–1	—

Source: Soccerway
Legend: Blue = home team win; Yellow = draw; Red = away team win.
For upcoming matches, an "a" indicates there is an article about the rivalry between the two participants.

== Group B (Centre) ==
=== Stadia and locations ===
4 teams from Emilia-Romagna, 4 teams from Tuscany, 3 teams from Marche, 3 teams from Umbria, 2 teams from Piedmont, 1 team from Abruzzo, 1 team from Lazio, 1 team from Molise and 1 team from Sardinia.

Location of teams in 2025–26 Serie C (Group B)

Club	City	Stadium	Capacity
Arezzo	Arezzo	Città di Arezzo	13,128
Ascoli	Ascoli Piceno	Cino e Lillo Del Duca	11,326
Bra	Bra	Giuseppe Sivori (Sestri Levante)	1,574
Campobasso	Campobasso	Antonio Molinari	25,000
Carpi	Carpi	Sandro Cabassi	5,510
Forlì	Forlì	Tullo Morgagni	3,500
Gubbio	Gubbio	Pietro Barbetti	4,939
Guidonia Montecelio	Guidonia Montecelio	Comunale di Guidonia Montecelio	2,900
Juventus Next Gen	Turin	Giuseppe Moccagatta (Alessandria)	5,827
Livorno	Livorno	Armando Picchi	14,312
Perugia	Perugia	Renato Curi	23,625
Pianese	Piancastagnaio	Comunale di Piancastagnaio	1,500
Pineto	Pineto	Pavone-Mariani	1,500
Pontedera	Pontedera	Ettore Mannucci	2,700
Ravenna	Ravenna	Bruno Benelli	12,020
Rimini	Rimini	Romeo Neri	9,768
Sambenedettese	San Benedetto del Tronto	Riviera delle Palme	13,786
Ternana	Terni	Libero Liberati	14,995
Torres	Sassari	Vanni Sanna	6,145
Vis Pesaro	Pesaro	Tonino Benelli	4,898

=== Personnel and sponsors ===
Club	Manager	Captain	Kit maker	Shirt sponsor(s)
Club	Manager	Captain	Kit maker	Main
Arezzo	(Italy) Cristian Bucchi	(Italy) Marco Chiosa	Rever	UnoAErre
Ascoli	(Italy) Francesco Tomei	(Argentina) Marcos Curado	Kappa	Portobello
Bra	(Italy) Fabio Nisticò	(Italy) Stefano Tuzza	Kappa	Bragas
Campobasso	(Italy) Luciano Zauri	(Italy) Vito Leonetti	Diaza	Universo Ceramiche
Carpi	(Italy) Stefano Cassani	(Italy) Matteo Cortesi	Macron	Texcart FiftyNine
Forlì	(Italy) Alessandro Miramari	(Italy) Riccardo Gaiola	Ready Sport	ER Lux
Gubbio	(Italy) Domenico Di Carlo	(Italy) Andrea Signorini	Legea	Colacem
Guidonia Montecelio	(Italy) Ciro Ginestra	(Italy) Andrea Cristini	Givova	Magazzini Maury's
Juventus Next Gen	(Italy) Massimo Brambilla	(Italy) Simone Guerra	Adidas	Jeep
Livorno	(Italy) Alessandro Formisano	(Italy) Federico Dionisi	Macron	Platinum-e Gas e Luce
Perugia	(Italy) Piero Braglia	(Italy) Giovanni Giunti	Frankie Garage	None
Pianese	(Italy) Alessandro Birindelli	(Italy) Luca Simeoni	Mizuno	Stosa Cucine
Pineto	(Italy) Ivan Tisci	(Italy) Stefano Amadio	Erreà	Liofilchem
Pontedera	(Italy) Leonardo Menichini	(Italy) Gabriele Perretta	Erreà	Freezanz
Ravenna	(Italy) Marco Marchionni	(Italy) Paolo Rrapaj	Nike	Cipriani
Rimini	(Italy) Filippo D'Alesio	(Italy) Gabriele Bellodi	Givova	None
Sambenedettese	(Italy) Ottavio Palladini	(Italy) Umberto Eusepi	Kappa	Giudici Polidori
Ternana	(Italy) Fabio Liverani	(Italy) Marco Capuano	Macron	None
Torres	(Italy) Michele Pazienza	(Italy) Giuseppe Mastinu	Footure Lab	Sardegna
Vis Pesaro	(Italy) Roberto Stellone	(Italy) Manuel Di Paola	Macron	LC Mobili

=== Table ===
Pos	Team	Pld	W	D	L	GF	GA	GD	Pts	Promotion or qualification
1	Arezzo (P)	36	24	8	4	64	24	+40	80	Promotion to Serie B and qualification for Supercoppa di Serie C
2	Ascoli (O, P)	36	23	8	5	63	23	+40	77	Qualification for the national play-offs second round
3	Ravenna	36	22	7	7	50	30	+20	73	Qualification for the national play-offs first round
4	Campobasso (Note: Campobasso were deducted 2 points due to administrative irregularities.)	36	17	10	9	49	37	+12	59	Qualification for the group play-offs second round
5	Juventus Next Gen	36	14	11	11	46	43	+3	53	Qualification for the group play-offs first round
6	Pianese	36	11	17	8	37	34	+3	50	Qualification for the group play-offs first round
7	Pineto	36	13	11	12	42	45	−3	50	Qualification for the group play-offs first round
8	Gubbio	36	11	15	10	31	32	−1	48	Qualification for the group play-offs first round
9	Ternana (Note: Ternana were deducted 5 points due to administrative irregularities. They went bankrupt after the end of the championship. Bra renounced to their subsequent right of reinstatement.) (E, R, R)	36	14	11	11	44	40	+4	48	Group play-offs first round then bankruptcy
10	Vis Pesaro	36	11	13	12	38	36	+2	46	Qualification for the group play-offs first round
11	Livorno	36	12	7	17	39	51	−12	43	
12	Forlì	36	10	10	16	41	52	−11	40	
13	Carpi	36	10	10	16	35	48	−13	40	
14	Perugia	36	8	14	14	38	44	−6	38	
15	Guidonia Montecelio	36	8	14	14	30	36	−6	38	
16	Sambenedettese	36	8	13	15	30	37	−7	37	
17	Torres (O)	36	6	18	12	32	45	−13	36	Qualification for the relegation play-outs
18	Bra (R)	36	6	14	16	37	54	−17	32	Loser of relegation play-outs, relegated to Serie D
19	Pontedera (Note: Automatically relegated for having more than eight points of distance from 16th-placed team Sambenedettese.) (R)	36	3	11	22	27	62	−35	20	Relegation to Serie D
20	Rimini (Note: Rimini was excluded on 28 November 2025 following the club's liquidation. Before that, the club had been deducted a total of 16 points due to various administrative irregularities.) (D, R, R)	0	0	0	0	0	0	0	0	Excluded

Source: Lega Pro, Soccerway (in English)
Rules for classification: 1) Points; 2) Head-to-head points; 3) Head-to-head goal difference; 4) Goal difference; 5) Goals scored; 6) Lower goals against; 7) Wins; 8) Lower losses; 9) Away wins; 10) Lower home losses.
(Note: Head-to-head record is used only after all the matches between the teams in question have been played)
(D) Disqualified; (E) Eliminated; (O) Play-off winners; (P) Promoted; (R) Relegated

=== Results ===
Home \ Away	ARE	ASC	BRA	CAM	CRP	FOR	GUB	GUM	JNG	LIV	PER	PIA	PIN	PON	RAV	SAM	TER	TOR	VPE
Arezzo	—	1–2	2–1	5–1	3–1	1–0	1–0	0–1	1–0	2–0	1–1	2–0	3–3	1–0	1–1	1–0	1–2	3–1	1–0
Ascoli	0–2	—	4–1	0–0	3–0	3–0	1–1	1–0	0–0	3–1	2–1	0–0	3–0	5–0	2–0	1–0	1–0	2–2	2–1
Bra	0–4	1–3	—	2–0	1–3	2–1	1–0	2–1	1–1	0–1	2–2	1–1	1–2	2–0	2–1	2–2	1–2	1–1	0–0
Campobasso	0–1	1–0	0–0	—	2–0	2–0	2–0	2–2	2–1	1–2	1–0	1–1	0–1	3–2	2–1	1–1	0–1	2–1	2–2
Carpi	0–1	1–1	2–1	2–2	—	0–1	0–3	1–1	1–1	2–0	2–0	1–1	1–2	2–0	1–2	0–0	0–1	1–1	1–1
Forlì	1–2	0–3	1–1	2–3	4–2	—	0–1	1–0	2–2	1–1	1–1	0–0	1–1	2–0	1–0	0–2	1–1	2–0	3–1
Gubbio	0–1	1–3	1–0	1–0	2–1	2–0	—	0–2	1–1	0–0	1–1	1–1	2–0	1–1	0–1	1–1	3–3	0–0	1–0
Guidonia Montecelio	0–0	0–0	1–1	0–0	2–3	2–2	0–1	—	1–1	0–2	1–2	1–0	0–2	2–0	1–2	0–1	1–1	0–0	0–0
Juventus Next Gen	2–3	1–0	2–2	0–1	2–0	1–0	2–2	1–0	—	2–1	1–0	0–0	1–0	0–1	2–4	4–2	2–1	2–1	1–3
Livorno	2–1	0–3	2–1	0–0	2–2	2–3	3–0	0–1	1–2	—	1–2	1–2	1–0	2–2	1–1	2–1	1–0	3–1	2–1
Perugia	0–0	0–2	1–1	0–1	1–1	4–0	0–1	0–0	2–2	2–0	—	0–1	0–1	2–1	1–1	1–2	1–2	1–1	2–1
Pianese	2–4	4–2	2–2	0–2	0–1	3–2	1–0	0–0	0–0	2–1	2–1	—	1–0	2–2	0–1	1–1	0–0	1–1	1–2
Pineto	1–4	1–3	2–1	1–0	1–0	3–2	1–0	3–3	2–3	3–0	3–0	1–1	—	1–1	0–3	0–0	0–3	0–0	1–1
Pontedera	0–3	1–3	0–0	0–4	0–1	2–1	1–1	0–1	0–1	0–2	2–2	2–0	1–1	—	0–1	1–1	2–2	1–3	0–2
Ravenna	0–3	1–0	3–1	3–2	1–0	0–0	1–1	2–1	2–0	2–0	3–2	0–0	1–0	2–1	—	1–0	1–0	3–0	1–0
Sambenedettese	0–0	0–1	1–0	0–1	0–1	1–2	0–0	0–1	4–2	0–0	0–1	0–2	1–1	2–1	0–1	—	0–0	1–2	0–2
Ternana	1–1	0–2	2–0	2–4	2–0	2–1	0–1	1–2	1–0	2–1	2–2	1–3	2–1	2–1	2–0	1–1	—	0–2	1–1
Torres	1–1	0–1	1–1	2–2	0–1	0–2	0–0	2–1	0–3	3–1	1–1	0–2	1–1	1–0	2–2	0–2	1–1	—	0–0
Vis Pesaro	0–3	1–1	2–1	1–2	3–0	1–1	1–1	2–1	1–0	3–0	0–1	0–0	0–2	1–1	1–0	2–3	1–0	0–0	—

Source: Soccerway
Legend: Blue = home team win; Yellow = draw; Red = away team win.
For upcoming matches, an "a" indicates there is an article about the rivalry between the two participants.

== Group C (South) ==
=== Stadia and locations ===
6 teams from Campania, 5 teams from Apulia, 3 teams from Sicily, 2 teams from Basilicata, 2 teams from Calabria, 1 team from Lazio and 1 team from Lombardy.

Location of teams in 2025–26 Serie C (Group C)
Location of teams in 2025–26 Serie C (Group C) (Campania and Basilicata)

Club	City	Stadium	Capacity
Atalanta U23	Bergamo	Comunale di Caravaggio (Caravaggio)	2,180
Audace Cerignola	Cerignola	Domenico Monterisi	7,453
Benevento	Benevento	Ciro Vigorito	16,867
Casarano	Casarano	Giuseppe Capozza	6,500
Casertana	Caserta	Alberto Pinto	12,000
Catania	Catania	Angelo Massimino	20,881
Cavese	Cava de' Tirreni	Simonetta Lamberti	5,200
Cosenza	Cosenza	San Vito-Gigi Marulla	20,987
Crotone	Crotone	Ezio Scida	16,640
Foggia	Foggia	Pino Zaccheria	25,085
Giugliano	Giugliano in Campania	Alberto De Cristofaro	6,030
Latina	Latina	Domenico Francioni	9,310
Monopoli	Monopoli	Vito Simone Veneziani	6,880
Picerno	Picerno	Donato Curcio	1,600
Potenza	Potenza	Alfredo Viviani	4,977
Salernitana	Salerno	Stadio Arechi	20,194
Siracusa	Syracuse	Nicola De Simone	5,946
Sorrento	Sorrento	Italia	3,600
Team Altamura	Altamura	Antonio D'Angelo	2,800
Trapani	Trapani	Provinciale	7,787

=== Personnel and sponsors ===
Club	Manager	Captain	Kit maker	Shirt sponsor(s)
Club	Manager	Captain	Kit maker	Main
Atalanta U23	(Italy) Salvatore Bocchetti	(Italy) Simone Panada	Joma	TAO Ambiente
Audace Cerignola	(Italy) Vincenzo Maiuri	(Italy) Luca Martinelli	Adidas	Proshop (H) / Ecodaunia (A) / Mineccia Group (T)
Benevento	(Italy) Antonio Floro Flores	(Italy) Mattia Maita	Nike	IVPC
Casarano	(Italy) Vito Di Bari	(Italy) Raffaele Maiello	Macron	Leo Shoes
Casertana	(Italy) Federico Coppitelli	(Italy) Federico Proia	Adidas	Pulsee Luce e Gas
Catania	(Italy) William Viali	(Italy) Francesco Di Tacchio	Erreà	SuperConveniente
Cavese	(Italy) Fabio Prosperi	(Italy) Luca Piana	Givova	Viride Group
Cosenza	(Italy) Antonio Buscè	(Italy) Tommaso D'Orazio	Adidas	None
Crotone	(Italy) Emilio Longo	(Italy) Guido Gómez	Zeus	Climamarket
Foggia	(Italy) Michele Pazienza	(Italy) Vincenzo Garofalo	Givova	None
Giugliano	(Italy) Raffaele Di Napoli	(Italy) Roberto De Rosa	Legea	Renato Mazzamauro & C.
Latina	(Italy) Gennaro Volpe	(Italy) Filippo Marenco	Ezeta	Distretti Ecologici
Monopoli	(Italy) Alberto Colombo	(Italy) Orlando Viteritti	Joma	Eco Sud Ricicli
Picerno	(Italy) Claudio De Luca	(Italy) Emmanuele Esposito	Givova	Delle Rose Ricevimenti
Potenza	(Italy) Pietro De Giorgio	(Italy) Fabrizio Alastra	Adidas	Cargo Trasporto e Distribuzione di Energia
Salernitana	(Italy) Serse Cosmi	(Italy) Roberto Inglese	Puma	Peugeot Gruppo Noviello
Siracusa	(Italy) Marco Turati	(Italy) Umberto Eusepi	Macron	Xeq Solar
Sorrento	(Italy) Cristian Serpini	(Italy) Vincenzo Di Somma	Ezeta	Mediterranean Shipping Company
Team Altamura	(Italy) Devis Mangia	(Italy) Marco Crimi	Erreà	None
Trapani	(Italy) Salvatore Aronica	(Italy) Amedeo Benedetti	Macron	SportInvest

=== Table ===
Pos	Team	Pld	W	D	L	GF	GA	GD	Pts	Promotion, qualification or relegation
1	Benevento (C, P)	38	25	7	6	74	28	+46	82	Promotion to Serie B and qualification for the Supercoppa di Serie C
2	Catania	38	19	13	6	54	25	+29	70	Qualification for the national play-offs second round
3	Salernitana	38	20	9	9	50	42	+8	69	Qualification for the national play-offs first round
4	Cosenza	38	19	10	9	58	40	+18	67	Qualification for the group play-offs second round
5	Casertana	38	19	9	10	55	44	+11	66	Qualification for the group play-offs first round
6	Crotone	38	18	7	13	59	40	+19	61	Qualification for the group play-offs first round
7	Monopoli	38	15	11	12	39	41	−2	56	Qualification for the group play-offs first round
8	Casarano	38	16	8	14	56	57	−1	56	Qualification for the group play-offs first round
9	Audace Cerignola	38	14	12	12	50	54	−4	54	Qualification for the group play-offs first round
10	Potenza	38	12	13	13	54	56	−2	49	Qualification for the national play-offs first round
11	Atalanta U23	38	11	12	15	53	50	+3	45	Qualification for the group play-offs first round
12	Team Altamura	38	11	12	15	32	49	−17	45	
13	Latina	38	10	12	16	35	44	−9	42	
14	Cavese	38	9	15	14	36	42	−6	42	
15	Picerno	38	9	13	16	43	55	−12	40	
16	Sorrento	38	9	12	17	39	55	−16	39	
17	Giugliano	38	9	10	19	35	52	−17	37	
18	Foggia (Note: Foggia were originally deducted 3 points due to administrative irregularities; the deduction was successively revoked on appeal. Automatically relegated for having more than eight points of distance from 17th-placed team Giugliano. Later reinstated instead of Ternana.) (T)	38	6	9	23	28	60	−32	27	Reinstated
19	Siracusa (Note: Siracusa were deducted 11 points due to administrative irregularities. Automatically relegated for having more than eight points of distance from 16th-placed team Sorrento.) (R)	38	9	10	19	48	57	−9	26	Relegation to Serie D
20	Trapani (Note: Trapani were deducted 25 points due to repeated administrative irregularities.) (R)	38	13	10	15	47	54	−7	24	Relegation to Serie D

Source: Lega Pro, Soccerway (in English)
Rules for classification: 1) Points; 2) Head-to-head points; 3) Head-to-head goal difference; 4) Goal difference; 5) Goals scored; 6) Lower goals against; 7) Wins; 8) Lower losses; 9) Away wins; 10) Lower home losses.
(Note: Head-to-head record is used only after all the matches between the teams in question have been played)
(C) Champions; (P) Promoted; (R) Relegated; (T) Qualified, but not yet for the particular phase indicated
Notes:

|note_res_PN1 = Potenza qualified for the national play-offs first round as the 2025–26 Coppa Italia Serie C winners.

}}

=== Results ===
Home \ Away	ATA	ACR	BEN	CSO	CST	CAT	CAV	COS	CRO	FOG	GIU	LAT	MPO	PIC	POT	SAL	SIR	SOR	TAT	TRA
Atalanta U23	—	3–2	3–4	6–2	0–2	1–1	1–1	0–0	1–2	1–1	0–1	1–2	2–0	6–2	2–2	0–1	3–1	1–2	0–0	2–0
Audace Cerignola	2–4	—	0–4	2–1	1–1	0–0	1–3	1–2	2–0	0–0	1–0	1–1	0–0	2–2	4–0	1–0	3–1	3–2	1–1	4–2
Benevento	2–0	2–2	—	3–0	2–1	2–1	0–1	1–1	2–1	1–0	4–0	1–1	3–1	1–0	2–0	5–1	3–2	1–1	4–0	2–0
Casarano	0–1	3–0	1–0	—	3–2	1–0	3–0	2–1	1–2	0–2	2–0	1–1	1–3	2–2	2–1	2–2	1–1	2–0	1–0	0–0
Casertana	1–0	4–1	0–0	0–3	—	2–2	3–1	1–1	2–2	3–2	1–1	3–1	2–1	2–1	3–2	1–0	1–0	2–0	3–1	0–1
Catania	2–0	0–0	1–0	1–1	0–0	—	2–0	2–0	2–0	6–0	1–0	1–0	4–0	1–2	1–1	2–0	2–0	0–0	2–0	4–0
Cavese	2–2	2–0	0–1	1–1	0–1	0–1	—	1–1	1–0	0–0	2–2	0–2	1–0	2–0	3–0	1–1	1–1	1–0	1–2	0–1
Cosenza	1–2	3–0	2–1	4–1	3–1	4–1	2–1	—	0–2	1–0	4–1	3–1	0–2	1–0	3–0	1–2	1–0	3–2	1–0	1–0
Crotone	1–0	3–1	1–2	2–0	0–1	2–0	2–0	0–0	—	3–1	1–0	2–5	0–1	3–0	2–0	0–1	2–0	3–1	0–1	1–2
Foggia	0–1	1–3	0–3	1–2	1–1	1–1	0–0	2–1	0–3	—	2–1	1–1	2–1	1–2	0–1	1–3	1–1	1–0	0–1	1–0
Giugliano	3–1	0–1	1–1	1–3	0–3	0–3	0–0	3–0	1–0	1–0	—	1–1	2–0	0–1	2–3	1–2	2–1	0–1	0–1	3–1
Latina	1–0	0–2	1–0	1–2	2–0	0–1	0–0	0–1	1–1	2–0	0–1	—	0–1	1–2	0–1	0–0	2–1	2–0	0–0	2–1
Monopoli	1–1	2–0	2–1	2–1	1–1	1–2	0–2	2–2	1–1	1–0	3–1	1–0	—	0–2	2–1	0–1	1–0	1–0	1–1	1–1
Picerno	1–1	1–1	2–2	1–2	0–2	0–1	2–2	3–1	3–1	2–1	2–2	0–0	0–0	—	2–0	1–2	1–2	0–0	0–0	1–1
Potenza	1–0	0–0	0–1	3–1	2–0	1–1	2–2	1–4	3–3	3–0	0–0	0–0	2–2	2–0	—	5–2	2–2	3–0	3–0	2–1
Salernitana	1–0	2–3	0–1	3–0	2–1	0–0	3–2	0–0	0–0	2–1	1–1	2–1	0–1	2–1	1–1	—	1–0	2–1	2–1	1–1
Siracusa	3–3	0–1	0–3	4–1	4–0	1–1	1–1	0–1	1–3	2–2	2–1	3–1	1–2	2–1	2–1	3–1	—	0–1	1–1	3–0
Sorrento	1–1	1–2	0–2	3–3	1–2	3–1	0–0	2–2	2–2	2–1	1–0	2–2	0–0	1–1	2–2	0–2	2–0	—	2–0	1–2
Team Altamura	1–1	1–1	1–2	0–4	0–2	1–2	2–1	1–1	0–4	1–0	1–1	1–0	2–0	3–1	2–2	1–2	1–0	1–2	—	1–1
Trapani	0–2	2–1	0–5	1–0	2–0	1–1	2–0	1–1	1–4	3–1	1–1	6–0	1–1	2–1	2–1	1–2	2–2	4–0	0–1	—

Source: Soccerway
Legend: Blue = home team win; Yellow = draw; Red = away team win.
For upcoming matches, an "a" indicates there is an article about the rivalry between the two participants.

== Promotion play-offs ==
Date and rules were confirmed on 31 March and 7 April 2025, respectively.

=== Group phase ===
==== First round ====
Matches were played on 3 May 2026.

Team 1	Score	Team 2
Cittadella	2–2	Arzignano
Trento	1–2	Giana Erminio
Lumezzane	0–0	Alcione Milano
Pianese	1–1	Ternana
Pineto	2–1	Gubbio
Crotone	1–1	Audace Cerignola
Monopoli	0–2	Casarano
Casertana	1–0	Atalanta U23
Juventus Next Gen	2–2	Vis Pesaro

==== Second round ====
Matches were played on 6 May 2026.

Team 1	Score	Team 2
Cittadella	1–0	Lumezzane
Lecco	2–1	Giana Erminio
Campobasso	1–1	Pineto
Juventus Next Gen	0–2	Pianese
Cosenza	1–5	Casarano
Casertana	1–1	Crotone

=== National phase ===
==== First round ====
The first leg was played on 10 May 2026, and the second leg was played on 13 May 2026.

Team 1	Agg.	Team 2	1st leg	2nd leg
Cittadella	3–3	Ravenna	2–2	1–1
Pianese	2–2	Lecco	1–1	1–1
Campobasso	1–6	Potenza	0–3	1–3
Casarano	3–2	Renate	0–2	3–0
Casertana	3–4	Salernitana	2–3	1–1

==== Second round ====
The first legs was played on 17 May 2026 and the second legs was played on 20 May 2026.

Team 1	Agg.	Team 2	1st leg	2nd leg
Union Brescia	3–0	Casarano	3–0	0–0
Ascoli	1–0	Potenza	0–0	1–0
Catania	3–3	Lecco	0–0	3–3
Ravenna	0–4	Salernitana	0–2	0–2

=== Final Four ===
==== Semi-finals ====
The first legs was played on 24 May 2026 and the second legs was played on 27 May 2026.

Team 1	Agg.	Team 2	1st leg	2nd leg
Ascoli	5–2	Catania	4–0	1–2
Salernitana	1–3	Union Brescia	1–1	0–2

==== Final ====
The first leg was played on 2 June 2026 and the second leg on 7 June 2026.

Team 1	Agg.	Team 2	1st leg	2nd leg
Union Brescia	1–4	Ascoli	1–1	0–3

== Relegation play-outs ==
The first leg was played on 9 May 2026 and the second leg on 16 May 2026.

Team 1	Agg.	Team 2	1st leg	2nd leg
Torres	3–1	Bra	1–0	2–1
