= 2023–24 Mantova 1911 season =

Mantova 1911
2023–24 season
- Manager: Davide Possanzini
- Stadium: Stadio Danilo Martelli
- Serie C Group A: 1st (promoted)
- Coppa Italia Serie C: First round
- Supercoppa Serie C: TBD
- Biggest win: Mantova 4–1 Pergolettese, Mantova 4–1 Renate
- Biggest defeat: Triestina 4–1 Mantova
Home colours	Away colours

The 2023–24 season was Mantova 1911's 113th season in existence and third consecutive season in the Serie C. They also competed in the Coppa Italia Serie C and the Supercoppa Serie C.

== Players ==
=== First-team squad ===
As of 22 January 2024.

Note: Flags indicate national team as defined under FIFA eligibility rules; some limited exceptions apply. Players may hold more than one non-FIFA nationality.

No.	Pos.	Nation	Player
1	GK	ITA	Marco Festa
4	DF	ITA	Christian Celesia
5	DF	ITA	Alex Redolfi
6	MF	ITA	Cristiano Bani
7	FW	ITA	Davis Mensah
8	MF	ITA	Salvatore Burrai
9	FW	ITA	Alessandro Debenedetti (on loan from Genoa)
10	MF	ITA	David Wieser
11	FW	ITA	Antonio Fiori
12	GK	ITA	Luca Sonzogni
13	DF	ITA	Fabrizio Brignani
14	FW	ITA	Francesco Galuppini
16	DF	ITA	Tommaso Cavalli (on loan from Atalanta)

No.	Pos.	Nation	Player
17	DF	ITA	Nicolò Radaelli
19	FW	ITA	Francesco Bombagi
20	MF	ITA	Giacomo Fedel
21	MF	ITA	Simone Trimboli
22	GK	ITA	Alessio Napoli
23	DF	ITA	Erik Panizzi
24	DF	ITA	Gabriel Argint
27	DF	ITA	Tommaso Maggioni
28	MF	ITA	Mattia Muroni
30	FW	ITA	Davide Bragantini (on loan from Hellas Verona)
45	FW	ITA	Gaetano Monachello
87	DF	FRA	Sebastien De Maio
90	FW	ITA	Stefano Giacomelli

=== Out on loan ===
Note: Flags indicate national team as defined under FIFA eligibility rules; some limited exceptions apply. Players may hold more than one non-FIFA nationality.

No.	Pos.	Nation	Player
—	MF	ITA	Alessandro Castellani (at Villafranca until 30 June 2024)

== Transfers ==
=== In ===
Pos.	Player	Transferred from	Fee	Date	Source

=== Out ===
Pos.	Player	Transferred to	Fee	Date	Source

== Pre-season and friendlies ==
Win Draw Loss

12 August 2023 Friendly	Mantova (Italy)	3–0	(Italy) Brescia	Mantua
18:00 CEST (UTC+2)	Monachello 45+2'; Galuppini 63'; Debenedetti 78'			Stadium: Stadio Danilo Martelli; Referee: Zago Francesco

20 August 2023 Friendly	Mantova (Italy)	2–2	(Italy) Rimini	Mantua
17:30 CEST (UTC+2)	Brignani 32'; Monachello 65' (pen.)	Report	Lamesta 41', 45+1'	Stadium: Stadio Danilo Martelli; Referee: Andrea Zoppi

== Competitions ==
=== Overall record ===
Competition	First match	Last match	Starting round	Final position	Record							
Competition	First match	Last match	Starting round	Final position	Pld	W	D	L	GF	GA	GD	Win %
Serie C	4 September 2023	28 April 2024	Matchday 1	Winners	38	24	8	6	72	31	+41	63.16
Coppa Italia Serie C	3 October 2023		First round	First round	1	0	0	1	0	1	−1	0.00
Supercoppa Serie C	5 May 2024	11 May 2024	First match		2	1	0	1	5	3	+2	50.00
Total					41	25	8	8	77	35	+42	60.98

Last updated: 11 May 2024
Source: Flashscore

=== Serie C ===
==== League table ====
Pos	Team	Pld	W	D	L	GF	GA	GD	Pts	Qualification
1	Mantova (P)	38	24	8	6	72	31	+41	80	Promotion to Serie B and Supercoppa di Serie C
2	Padova	38	21	14	3	55	28	+27	77	National play-offs 2nd round
3	Vicenza	38	20	11	7	52	30	+22	71	National play-offs 1st round
4	Triestina	38	19	7	12	61	44	+17	64	Group play-offs 2nd round
5	Atalanta U23	38	16	11	11	43	36	+7	59	Group play-offs 1st round

Updated to match(es) played on 28 April 2024. Source: Lega Pro, Soccerway (in English)
Rules for classification: 1) Points; 2) Head-to-head points; 3) Head-to-head goal difference; 4) Goal difference; 5) Goals scored; 6) Lower goals against; 7) Wins; 8) Lower losses; 9) Away wins; 10) Lower home losses.
(Note: Head-to-head record is used only after all the matches between the teams in question have been played)
(P) Promoted

==== Results summary ====
Overall								Home						Away					
Pld	W	D	L	GF	GA	GD	Pts	W	D	L	GF	GA	GD	W	D	L	GF	GA	GD
38	24	8	6	72	31	+41	80	13	4	2	37	13	+24	11	4	4	35	18	+17

Source: Worldfootball

==== Results by round ====
Round	1	2	3	4	5	6	7	8	9	10	11	12	13	14	15	16	17	18	19	20	21	22	23	24	25	26	27	28	29	30	31	32	33	34	35	36	37	38
Ground	H	A	H	A	H	A	H	A	H	H	A	H	A	H	A	H	A	H	A	A	H	A	H	A	H	A	H	A	A	H	A	H	A	H	A	H	A	H
Result	D	W	W	W	W	L	W	D	W	W	W	W	W	L	W	W	W	W	W	W	D	W	W	L	W	W	W	D	D	W	W	W	D	D	L	L	L	D
Position	8	4	3	1	1	3	2	2	2	1	1	1	1	2	1	1	1	1	1	1	1	1	1	1	1	1	1	1	1	1	1	1	1	1	1	1	1	1

Source: Worldfootball
A = Away; H = Home; W = Win; D = Draw; L = Loss

==== Matches ====
The league fixtures were unveiled on 7 August 2023.

4 September 2023 1	Mantova	1–1	Padova	Mantua
20:45 CEST (UTC+2)	Galuppini 11'; Maggioni (yellow card) 37'; Trimboli (yellow card) 55'; Bani (yellow card) 68'		Niko Kirwan (yellow card) 51'; Delli Carri 72'; Perrotta (yellow card) 86'	Stadium: Stadio Danilo Martelli; Referee: Gianluca Grasso

10 September 2023 2	Arzignano Valchiampo	0–2	Mantova	Arzignano
18:30 CEST (UTC+2)			Galuppini 16'; Maggioni 60'	Stadium: Stadio Tommaso Dal Molin; Referee: Erminio Cerbasi

16 September 2023 3	Mantova	2–0	Pro Sesto	Mantua
20:45 CEST (UTC+2)				Stadium: Stadio Danilo Martelli

20 September 2023 4	Giana Erminio	0–2	Mantova	Gorgonzola
20:45 CEST (UTC+2)				Stadium: Stadio Città di Gorgonzola

24 September 2023 5	Mantova	3–1	AlbinoLeffe	Mantua
18:30 CEST (UTC+2)	Brignani 12', 87'; Galuppini 66'		Zanini 15'	Stadium: Stadio Danilo Martelli

29 September 2023 6	Triestina	4–1	Mantova	Trieste
20:45 CEST (UTC+2)	Lescano 19' (pen.), 20', 46'; Finotto 50'		Burrai 53'	Stadium: Stadio Nereo Rocco

6 October 2023 7	Mantova	2–0	Alessandria	Mantua
20:45 CEST (UTC+2)	Nichetti 4' (o.g.); Fiori 57'			Stadium: Stadio Danilo Martelli

14 October 2023 8	Pro Patria	0–0	Mantova	Busto Arsizio
14:00 CEST (UTC+2)				Stadium: Stadio Carlo Speroni; Referee: Enrico Gemelli

21 October 2023 9	Mantova	2–1	Novara	Mantua
18:30 CEST (UTC+2)	Celesia 79'; Giacomelli 90+1'		Bertoncini 63'	Stadium: Stadio Danilo Martelli

24 October 2023 10	Mantova	1–0	Pro Vercelli	Mantua
20:45 CEST (UTC+2)	Burrai (penalty missed) 52'; Muroni 57'			Stadium: Stadio Danilo Martelli; Referee: Fabrizio Ramondino

28 October 2023 11	Virtus Verona	0–2	Mantova	Verona
16:15 CEST (UTC+2)			Brignani 58'; Suagher 72'	Stadium: Stadio Comunale Gavagnin-Nocini; Referee: Valerio Vogliacco

5 November 2023 12	Mantova	4–1	Pergolettese	Mantua
16:15 CET (UTC+1)	Galuppini 10' (pen.); Burrai 26'; Bragantini 69'; Fedel 84'		Burrai 15' (o.g.)	Stadium: Stadio Danilo Martelli

11 November 2023 13	Fiorenzuola	2–3	Mantova	Fiorenzuola d'Arda
16:15 CET (UTC+1)				Stadium: Stadio comunale

19 November 2023 14	Mantova	0–1	Trento	Mantua
CET (UTC+1)				Stadium: Stadio Danilo Martelli

3 December 2023 16	Mantova	4–1	Renate	Mantua
CET (UTC+1)				Stadium: Stadio Danilo Martelli

16 December 2023 18	Mantova	1–0	Lumezzane	Mantua
CET (UTC+1)				Stadium: Stadio Danilo Martelli

14 January 2024 21	Mantova	1–1	Arzignano Valchiampo	Mantua
CET (UTC+1)				Stadium: Stadio Danilo Martelli

26 January 2024 23	Mantova	2–0	Giana Erminio	Mantua
CET (UTC+1)				Stadium: Stadio Danilo Martelli

9 February 2024 25	Mantova	2–1	Triestina	Mantua
CET (UTC+1)				Stadium: Stadio Danilo Martelli

17 February 2024 27	Mantova	3–1	Pro Patria	Mantua
CET (UTC+1)				Stadium: Stadio Danilo Martelli

25 February 2024 28	Novara	1–1	Mantova	Novara
16:15 CET (UTC+1)				Stadium: Stadio Silvio Piola

2 March 2024 29	Pro Vercelli	1–1	Mantova	Vercelli
CET (UTC+1)				Stadium: Stadio Silvio Piola

5 March 2024 30	Mantova	4–0	Virtus Verona	Mantua
CET (UTC+1)				Stadium: Stadio Danilo Martelli

9 March 2024 31	Pergolettese	0–4	Mantova	Crema
CET (UTC+1)				Stadium: Stadio Giuseppe Voltini

16 March 2024 32	Mantova	2–0	Fiorenzuola	Mantua
CET (UTC+1)				Stadium: Stadio Danilo Martelli

23 March 2024 33	Trento	1–1	Mantova	Trento
CET (UTC+1)				Stadium: Stadio Briamasco

30 March 2024 34	Mantova	1–1	Atalanta U23	Mantua
CET (UTC+1)				Stadium: Stadio Danilo Martelli

8 April 2024 35	Renate	2–0	Mantova	Meda
CET (UTC+1)				Stadium: Stadio Mino Favini

14 April 2024 36	Mantova	1–2	Vicenza	Mantua
CET (UTC+1)				Stadium: Stadio Danilo Martelli

20 April 2024 37	Lumezzane	4–3	Mantova	Lumezzane
CET (UTC+1)				Stadium: Stadio Tullio Saleri

28 April 2024 38	Mantova	1–1	Legnago Salus	Mantua
CET (UTC+1)				Stadium: Stadio Danilo Martelli

=== Coppa Italia Serie C ===
3 October 2023 First round	Mantova	0–1	Pro Patria	Mantua
18:30 CEST (UTC+2)			Citterio 49'	Stadium: Stadio Danilo Martelli

=== Supercoppa Serie C ===
5 May 2024 1	Mantova	1–2	Cesena	Mantua
17:30 CEST (UTC+2)	Debenedetti 83'		Corazza 63' (pen.); Shpendi 90+2'	Stadium: Stadio Danilo Martelli; Referee: Domenico Mirabella

11 May 2024 2	Juve Stabia	1–4	Mantova	Castellammare di Stabia
18:00 CEST (UTC+2)	Buglio 57'	Report	Wieser 19'; Shpendi 33'; Bragantini 45+3'; Monachello 90+6' (pen.)	Stadium: Stadio Romeo Menti; Referee: Valerio Pezzopane
