= 2005–06 AC Mantova season =

Mantova
2005–06 season
- Chairman: Fabrizio Lori
- Manager: Domenico Di Carlo
- Stadium: Stadio Danilo Martelli
- Serie B: 4th
- Coppa Italia: First round

The 2005–06 season was the 95th season in the existence of A.C. Mantova and the club's first season back in the second division of Italian football. In addition to the domestic league, Mantova participated in this season's edition of the Coppa Italia.

== Competitions ==
=== Overall record ===
Competition	First match	Last match	Starting round	Final position	Record							
Competition	First match	Last match	Starting round	Final position	Pld	W	D	L	GF	GA	GD	Win %
Serie B	4 September 2005	May 2006	Matchday 1	4th	42	18	15	9	46	35	+11	42.86
Coppa Italia	7 August 2005		First round	First round	1	0	0	1	0	2	−2	0.00
Total					43	18	15	10	46	37	+9	41.86

Last updated: May 2006
Source: Competitions

=== Serie B ===
==== League table ====
Pos	Team	Pld	W	D	L	GF	GA	GD	Pts	Promotion or relegation
2	Catania (P)	42	22	12	8	67	42	+25	78	Promotion to Serie A
3	Torino (O, P)	42	21	13	8	51	31	+20	76	Qualification to promotion play-offs
4	Mantova	42	18	15	9	46	35	+11	69	Qualification to promotion play-offs
5	Modena	42	17	16	9	59	41	+18	67	Qualification to promotion play-offs
6	Cesena	42	18	12	12	66	54	+12	66	Qualification to promotion play-offs

Source: Almanacco Illustrato del Calcio 2007, Panini Edizioni, Modena, November 2006
Rules for classification: 1) points; 2) head-to-head points; 3) head-to-head goal difference; 4) head-to-head goals scored; 5) goal difference; 6) number of goals scored.
(O) Play-off winners; (P) Promoted

==== Results summary ====
Overall								Home						Away					
Pld	W	D	L	GF	GA	GD	Pts	W	D	L	GF	GA	GD	W	D	L	GF	GA	GD
0	0	0	0	0	0	0	0	0	0	0	0	0	0	0	0	0	0	0	0

Last updated: May 2006.
Source: Serie B

==== Results by round ====
Round	1	2	3	4	5	6	7	8	9	10	11	12	13	14	15	16	17	18	19	20	21	22	23	24	25	26	27	28	29	30	31	32	33	34	35	36	37	38	39	40	41	42
Ground	A	H	A	H	A	A	H	H	A	H	A	H	A	H	A	H	A	H	A	H	A	H	A	H	A	H	H	A	A	H	A	H	A	H	A	H	A	H	A	H	A	H
Result	D	W	D	W	W	W	W	W	D	W	W	W	D	W	D	D	D	W	D	D	L	W	L	W	L	D	L	W	L	W	L	D	L	W	D	L	W	D	L	D	W	D
Position																																										

Updated to match(es) played on May 2006. Source: Serie B
A = Away; H = Home; W = Win; D = Draw; L = Loss

==== Matches ====
Win Draw Loss

4 September 2005 2	Mantova	1–0	Arezzo	Mantua
--:-- CEST (UTC+2)				Stadium: Stadio Danilo Martelli

10 September 2005 4	Mantova	3–2	Cesena	Mantua
--:-- CEST (UTC+2)				Stadium: Stadio Danilo Martelli

14 September 2005 1	Modena	0–0	Mantova	Modena
--:-- CEST (UTC+2)

17 September 2005 5	Piacenza	1–3	Mantova	Piacenza
--:-- CEST (UTC+2)

20 September 2005 6	Vicenza	0–1	Mantova	Vicenza
--:-- CEST (UTC+2)

24 September 2005 7	Mantova	3–1	Rimini	Mantua
--:-- CEST (UTC+2)				Stadium: Stadio Danilo Martelli

30 September 2005 8	Mantova	1–0	Atalanta	Mantua
--:-- CEST (UTC+2)				Stadium: Stadio Danilo Martelli

5 October 2005 3	Bari	1–1	Mantova	Bari
--:-- CEST (UTC+2)

9 October 2005 9	Crotone	1–1	Mantova	Crotone
--:-- CEST (UTC+2)

15 October 2005 10	Mantova	3–0	Catania	Mantua
--:-- CEST (UTC+2)				Stadium: Stadio Danilo Martelli

22 October 2005 11	Cremonese	1–2	Mantova	Cremona
--:-- CEST (UTC+2)

26 October 2005 12	Mantova	1–0	Torino	Mantua
--:-- CEST (UTC+2)				Stadium: Stadio Danilo Martelli

29 October 2005 13	Avellino	0–0	Mantova	Avellino
--:-- CEST (UTC+2)

5 November 2005 14	Mantova	1–0	Brescia	Mantua
--:-- CET (UTC+1)				Stadium: Stadio Danilo Martelli

14 November 2005 15	Bologna	0–0	Mantova	Bologna
--:-- CET (UTC+1)

19 November 2005 16	Mantova	0–0	Catanzaro	Mantua
--:-- CET (UTC+1)				Stadium: Stadio Danilo Martelli

26 November 2005 17	Ternana	1–1	Mantova	Terni
--:-- CET (UTC+1)

3 December 2005 18	Mantova	1–0	AlbinoLeffe	Mantua
--:-- CET (UTC+1)				Stadium: Stadio Danilo Martelli

9 December 2005 19	Hellas Verona	2–2	Mantova	Verona
--:-- CET (UTC+1)

17 December 2005 20	Mantova	2–2	Triestina	Mantua
--:-- CET (UTC+1)				Stadium: Stadio Danilo Martelli

21 December 2005 21	Pescara	2–1	Mantova	Pescara
--:-- CET (UTC+1)

9 January 2006 22	Mantova	2–0	Modena	Mantua
--:-- CET (UTC+1)				Stadium: Stadio Danilo Martelli

14 January 2006 23	Arezzo	2–0	Mantova	Arezzo
--:-- CET (UTC+1)

17 January 2006 24	Mantova	1–0	Bari	Mantua
--:-- CET (UTC+1)				Stadium: Stadio Danilo Martelli

23 January 2006 25	Cesena	2–0	Mantova	Cesena
--:-- CET (UTC+1)

28 January 2006 26	Mantova	1–1	Piacenza	Mantua
--:-- CET (UTC+1)				Stadium: Stadio Danilo Martelli

3 February 2006 27	Mantova	0–1	Vicenza	Mantua
--:-- CET (UTC+1)				Stadium: Stadio Danilo Martelli

7 February 2006 28	Rimini	1–3	Mantova	Rimini
--:-- CET (UTC+1)

11 February 2006 29	Atalanta	2–1	Mantova	Bergamo
--:-- CET (UTC+1)

25 February 2006 30	Mantova	3–2	Crotone	Mantua
--:-- CET (UTC+1)				Stadium: Stadio Danilo Martelli

6 March 2006 31	Catania	3–0	Mantova	Catania
--:-- CET (UTC+1)

11 March 2006 32	Mantova	0–0	Cremonese	Mantua
--:-- CET (UTC+1)				Stadium: Stadio Danilo Martelli

18 March 2006 33	Torino	2–0	Mantova	Turin
--:-- CET (UTC+1)

25 March 2006 34	Mantova	3–0	Avellino	Mantua
--:-- CET (UTC+1)				Stadium: Stadio Danilo Martelli

2 April 2006 35	Brescia	0–0	Mantova	Brescia
--:-- CEST (UTC+2)

10 April 2006 36	Mantova	0–2	Bologna	Mantua
--:-- CEST (UTC+2)				Stadium: Stadio Danilo Martelli

23 April 2006 37	Catanzaro	0–1	Mantova	Catanzaro
--:-- CEST (UTC+2)

29 April 2006 38	Mantova	1–1	Ternana	Mantua
--:-- CEST (UTC+2)				Stadium: Stadio Danilo Martelli

6 May 2006 39	AlbinoLeffe	2–1	Mantova	Bergamo
--:-- CEST (UTC+2)				Stadium: Stadio Atleti Azzurri d'Italia; Attendance: 1,725

13 May 2006 40	Mantova	0–0	Hellas Verona	Mantua
--:-- CEST (UTC+2)				Stadium: Stadio Danilo Martelli

21 May 2006 41	Triestina	0–1	Mantova	Trieste
--:-- CEST (UTC+2)

28 May 2006 42	Mantova	0–0	Pescara	Mantua
15:00 CEST (UTC+2)				Stadium: Stadio Danilo Martelli; Attendance: 8,531; Referee: Andrea Romeo

=== Coppa Italia ===
7 August 2005 First round	Grosseto	2–0	Mantova
