= David Wieser =

Italian footballer (born 2002)

Personal information
- Date of birth: 13 February 2002 (age 24)
- Place of birth: Sterzing, Italy
- Height: 1.82 m (6 ft 0 in)
- Position: Midfielder

Team information
- Current team: Mantova
- Number: 10

Youth career
- Gherdëina
- Brixen
- –2017: Südtirol
- 2017–2022: Inter Milan
- 2021–2022: → Bologna (loan)

Senior career*
Years	Team	Apps	(Gls)
2022–2023	Inter Milan	0	(0)
2022–2023	→ Pro Sesto (loan)	18	(0)
2023–	Mantova	86	(3)
- * Club domestic league appearances and goals as of 13 May 2026

David Wieser (born 13 February 2002) is an Italian professional footballer who plays as a midfielder for Serie B club Mantova.

== Club career ==
Born in Sterzing to an Italian father and a Brazilian mother, Wieser started his football career at age six in the youth sector of his hometown club Gherdëina. He later moved to Brixen, then to Südtirol, and eventually, in 2017, joined the youth academy of Inter Milan, where he played for four seasons.

On 21 August 2021, Wieser joined Bologna on a season-long loan, where he was placed in the Primavera squad.

On 26 July 2022, Wieser embarked on his first professional season by joining Serie C side Pro Sesto on loan.

On 28 July 2023, Wieser signed a three-year contract with Serie C club Mantova, where he helped the team secure promotion to Serie B in his first season.

== Career statistics ==
As of match played 13 May 2025

Appearances and goals by club, season and competition
Club	Season	League			National cup		League cup		Continental		Other		Total	
Club	Season	Division	Apps	Goals	Apps	Goals	Apps	Goals	Apps	Goals	Apps	Goals	Apps	Goals
Pro Sesto (loan)	2022–23	Serie C	18	0	—		1 (Note: Appearance(s) in Coppa Italia Serie C)	0	—		1 (Note: Appearance in Serie C promotion play-offs)	0	20	0
Mantova	2023–24	Serie C	30	2	—		1	0	—		2 (Note: Appearances in Supercoppa di Serie C)	1	33	3
Mantova	2024–25	Serie B	29	0	2	0	—		—		—		31	0
Mantova	Total		59	2	2	0	1	0	0	0	2	1	64	3
Career total			77	2	2	0	2	0	0	0	3	1	84	3
