= Tommaso Gabellini =

Italian footballer (born 2006)

Personal information
- Date of birth: 21 October 2006 (age 20)
- Place of birth: Pesaro, Italy
- Height: 1.90 m (6 ft 3 in)
- Position: Forward

Team information
- Current team: Forlì (on loan from Torino)
- Number: 19

Youth career
- –2020: Rimini
- 2020–2022: Cesena
- 2023–: Torino

Senior career*
Years	Team	Apps	(Gls)
2024–	Torino	1	(0)
2026–	→ Forlì (loan)	5	(0)
- * Club domestic league appearances and goals as of 27 September 2026

Tommaso Gabellini (born 21 October 2006) is an Italian professional footballer who plays as a forward for Serie C Group B club Forlì, on loan from Torino.

== Early life ==
Gabellini was born on 21 October 2006. Born in Italy, he is a native of Emilia-Romagna, Italy.

== Career ==
As a youth player, Gabellini joined the youth academy of Rimini. During September 2020, he joined the youth academy of Cesena. Following his stint there, he joined the youth academy of Serie A side Torino and was promoted to the club's senior team in 2024.

== Style of play ==
Gabellini plays as a forward. Italian news website MondoPrimavera wrote in 2024 that he "is a number 9, preferring to play as a central striker, but he's a player capable of linking up with a variety of teammates in the attack, given his physical and technical attributes. He's a left-footed striker, who also has a long shot in his repertoire".
