= Roberto Montorsi =

Italian footballer

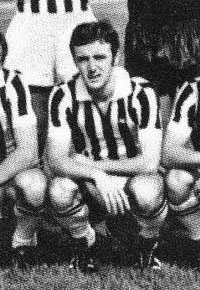
- Montorsi with Juventus in 1970

Personal information
- Date of birth: August 22, 1951 (age 75)
- Place of birth: Castellucchio, Italy
- Height: 1.69 m (5 ft 6 1/2 in)
- Position: Midfielder

Senior career*
Years	Team	Apps	(Gls)
1968–1970	Mantova	17	(2)
1970–1971	Juventus	1	(0)
1971–1972	Mantova	6	(0)
1972–1973	Monza	4	(0)
1973–1974	Sorrento	33	(7)
1974–1975	Padova	0	(0)
- * Club domestic league appearances and goals

Roberto Montorsi (born August 22, 1951) is an Italian former footballer who played professionally for Mantova, Juventus, Monza, Sorrento and Padova.

== See also ==
- Football in Italy
- List of football clubs in Italy
