= Jacopo Scaccabarozzi =

Italian footballer

Personal information
- Date of birth: 18 November 1994 (age 31)
- Place of birth: Lecco, Italy
- Height: 1.79 m (5 ft 10 in)
- Position: Midfielder

Team information
- Current team: Forlì
- Number: 32

Senior career*
Years	Team	Apps	(Gls)
2011–2013	Olginatese	65	(8)
2013–2017	Renate	132	(16)
2017–2019	Piacenza	22	(1)
2018	→ Renate (loan)	7	(0)
2018–2019	→ Vibonese (loan)	34	(2)
2019–2020	Lecco	8	(0)
2020	→ Renate (loan)	4	(0)
2020–2023	Juve Stabia	98	(2)
2023–2025	Turris	55	(4)
2025–2026	Pontedera	28	(1)
2026–	Forlì	7	(1)
- * Club domestic league appearances and goals as of 30 April 2026

Jacopo Scaccabarozzi (born 18 November 1994) is an Italian professional footballer who plays as a midfielder for Serie C Group B club Forlì.

== Career ==
Born in Lecco, Scaccabarozzi started his senior career in Serie D club Olginatese at 16.

In August 2013, he moved to Lega Pro Seconda Divisione club Renate. The club won the promotion to Serie C this season. He played four years for the club, three in Serie C.

In July 2017, he joined to Piacenza. In January 2018, Jacopo returned to Renate at loan.

On 23 July 2018, he was loaned to Vibonese.

On 18 July 2019, Scaccabarozzi signed with Lecco.

On 31 August 2020, he moved to Juve Stabia, in Serie C.
