= Carlo De Risio =

Italian football player (born 1991)

Personal information
- Date of birth: 3 June 1991 (age 35)
- Place of birth: Vasto, Italy
- Height: 1.84 m (6 ft 0 in)
- Position: Midfielder

Team information
- Current team: Forlì
- Number: 23

Youth career
- Montenero
- Vinchiaturo
- Pescara
- –2010: Benevento

Senior career*
Years	Team	Apps	(Gls)
2010–2015	Benevento	29	(0)
2012	→ Celano (loan)	14	(1)
2013	→ Catanzaro (loan)	6	(0)
2014–2015	→ Martina Franca (loan)	22	(1)
2015–2016	Juve Stabia	8	(0)
2016–2018	Padova	48	(0)
2018	Avellino	15	(0)
2018–2020	Catanzaro	43	(2)
2020–2022	Bari	30	(0)
2022	→ Pescara (loan)	14	(0)
2022–2025	Monopoli	66	(3)
2025–	Forlì	32	(0)
- * Club domestic league appearances and goals as of 30 April 2026

Carlo De Risio (Vasto 3 June 1991) is an Italian professional footballer who plays as a midfielder for Serie C Group B club Forlì.

== Career ==
De Risio made his Serie C debut for Benevento on 29 August 2010, in a game against Virtus Lanciano.

On 19 August 2018, he signed a two-year contract with Catanzaro with an option for a third year.

On 15 September 2020, De Risio moved to Bari. On 8 January 2022, he was loaned to Pescara.

On 1 September 2022, De Risio signed a two-year contract with Monopoli.
