= Alex Redolfi =

Italian footballer (born 1994)

Personal information
- Date of birth: 20 January 1994 (age 32)
- Place of birth: Calcinate, Italy
- Height: 1.90 m (6 ft 3 in)
- Position: Defender

Team information
- Current team: Cittadella
- Number: 55

Youth career
- –2013: Atalanta

Senior career*
Years	Team	Apps	(Gls)
2013–2018	Atalanta	0	(0)
2013–2014	→ Como (loan)	20	(1)
2014–2015	→ Pontedera (loan)	34	(0)
2015–2016	→ Pro Vercelli (loan)	4	(0)
2016–2017	→ Olhanense (loan)	15	(0)
2017	→ Cremonese (loan)	7	(0)
2017–2018	→ Juve Stabia (loan)	16	(0)
2018–2019	Reggina	13	(1)
2019–2021	Vibonese	54	(2)
2021–2023	Gubbio	67	(4)
2023–2025	Mantova	50	(4)
2025–	Cittadella	30	(2)

International career
2011	Italy U-18	2	(0)
- * Club domestic league appearances and goals as of 29 April 2026

Alex Redolfi (born 20 January 1994) is an Italian footballer who plays as a defender for Serie C Group A club Cittadella.

== Club career ==
=== Atalanta ===
Born in Calcinate, Redolfi was a youth exponent of Atalanta.

==== Loan to Como ====
On 11 July 2013, Redolfi was signed by Serie C side Como on a season-long loan deal. On 1 September e made his Serie C debut for Como, as a starter, in a 1–0 away defeat against Virtus Entella, he played the entire match. On 1 December he scored his first professional goal in Serie C in the 37th minute of a 2–0 home win over Venezia. On 11 May 2014 he was sent off with a double yellow card in the 112th minute of a match lost 4–3 at penalty after a 0–0 away draw against Südtirol in the quarter-finals of the Serie C playoffs. Redolfi ended his season-long loan to Como with 20 appearances and 1 goal.

==== Loan to Pontedera ====
On 8 July 2014, Redolfi was signed by Serie C side Pontedera on a season-long loan deal. On 10 August he made his debut for Pontedera, he was replaced by Andrea Gasbarro in the 60th minute of a 3–1 home win over Messina in the first round of Coppa Italia. On 8 September, Redolfo made his Serie C debut for Pontedera as a substitute replacing Filippo Scardina in the 82nd minute of a 2–1 home win over San Marino Calcio. On 20 September he played his first entire match for Pontedera, a 1–0 away defeat against Lucchese. Redolfi ended his loan to Pontedera with 35 appearances, including 30 as a starter, and 2 assists.

==== Loan to Pro Vercelli ====
On 10 July 2015, Redolfi signed a season-long loan deal with Serie B side Pro Vercelli. On 9 August he made his debut for Pro Vercelli, as a starter, in a 2–1 home defeat against Alessandria in the second round of Coppa Italia, he played the entire match. On 6 September, Redolfi made his Serie B debut for Pro Vercelli as a substitute replacing Mattia Bani in the 82nd minute of a 2–1 home win over Virtus Lanciano. On 2 April 2016 he played his first entire match in Serie B, a 1–1 home draw against Modena. Redolfi ended his season-long loan to Pro Vercelli with only 5 appearances, 2 as a starter and 3 as a substitute.

==== Loan to Olhanense and Cremonese ====
On 1 July 2016, Redolfi was signed by LigaPro side Olhanense on a season-long loan deal. On 31 July he made his debut for Olhanense in a 2–1 home defeat against Varzim in the first round of Taça da Liga, he was replaced by Carlos Freitas in the 74th minute. On 6 August, Redolfi made his LigaPro debut in a 2–1 home defeat against Académica, he played the entire match. On 7 January Redolfi, as a substitute, made an own goal in the 69th minute of a 4–0 away defeat against Penafiel. In January 2017, Redolfi was re-called to Atalanta leaving Olhanense with 16 appearances.

On 18 January 2017, Redolfi was signed by Serie C side Cremonese on a 6-month loan deal. On 22 January he made his debut in Serie C for Cremonese, as a starter, in a 1–1 home draw against Pro Piacenza, he was replaced by Alessandro Bastrini in the 37th minute. On 5 February, Redolfi played his first complete match for Cremonese, a 3–3 home draw against Carrarese. Redolfi ended his loan to Cremonese with 7 appearances but Cremonese won the Serie C title.

==== Loan to Juve Stabia ====
On 13 July 2017, Resolfi was signed by Serie C side Juve Stabia on a season-long loan deal. On 30 July he made his debut for Juve Stabia in a 3–1 home win over Bassano Virtus in the first round of Coppa Italia, he played the entire match. On 26 August, Redolfi made his Serie C debut for Juve Stabia in a 3–3 away draw against Fidelis Andria, he was replaced by Zhivko Atanasov in the 75th minute. On 9 September he played his first complete match in Serie C for Juve Stabia, a 0–0 away draw against Catanzaro. On 3 October, Radolfi scored an own goal in the 45th minute and he was sent off with a double yellow card 81st minute of a 1–0 away defeat against Bisceglie. Redolfi ended his loan to Juve Stabia with 17 appearances.

=== Reggina ===
On 25 July 2018, Redolfi was signed by Serie C club Reggina on an undisclosed fee and a 2-year contract. On 18 September, Redolfi made his debut for Reggina in a 3–0 away defeat against Trapani, he was replaced by Cesare Pogliano in the 88th minute. On 2 December he played his first entire match for Reggina, a 3–2 home win over Rieti. On 30 December he scored his first goal for the club in the 7th minute of a 1–1 home draw against Trapani. Redolfi ended his first season at Reggina with 13 appearances and 1 goal.

=== Vibonese ===
On 10 August 2019, Redolfi joined to Serie C club Vibonese on an undisclosed fee and a 1-year contract with the option for the second year. Two weeks later, on 25 August, Redolfi made his league debut for Vibonese in a 1–0 away defeat against Monopoli, he played the entire match. On 23 February 2020 he scored his first goal for the club in the 64th minute of a 2–1 away win over Casertana.

=== Gubbio ===
On 19 July 2021, he moved to Gubbio.

On 30 June 2023, he didn't extend his contract with the club, so he left it.

=== Mantova ===
On 10 July 2023, he joined Mantova.

== International career ==
Redolfi represented Italy only at Under-18 level and he collected a total of 2 caps. On 20 October 2011, Radolfi made his debut in the Italy U-18, in an international friendly, as a substitute replacing Daniele Rugani in the 46th minute of a 3–0 home defeat against Ukraine U-18. On 9 November, Radolfi made his second appearance for Italy U-18 as a starter in a 2–1 away defeat Germany U-18, he was replaced by Federico Maccarone in the 66th minute.

== Career statistics ==
=== Club ===
As of 8 July 2020

Club	Season	League			Cup		Europe		Other		Total	
Club	Season	League	Apps	Goals	Apps	Goals	Apps	Goals	Apps	Goals	Apps	Goals
Como (loan)	2013–14	Serie C	19	1	0	0	—		1 (Note: All appearance(s) in Serie C play-off.)	0	20	1
Pontedera (loan)	2014–15	Serie C	34	0	1	0	—		—		35	0
Pro Vercelli (loan)	2015–16	Serie B	4	0	1	0	—		—		5	0
Olhanense (loan)	2016–17	LigaPro	15	0	1	0	—		—		16	0
Cremonese (loan)	2016–17	Serie C	7	0	—		—		—		7	0
Juve Stabia (loan)	2017–18	Serie C	13	0	1	0	—		3	0	17	0
Reggina	2018–19	Serie C	13	1	0	0	—		—		13	1
Vibonese	2019–20	Serie C	28	1	0	0	—		—		28	1
Career total			133	3	4	0	—		4	0	141	3

== Honours ==
=== Club ===
Cremonese

- Serie C (Group A): 2016–17
