= Forlì FC =

Association football club in Italy

- Full name: Football Club Forlì
- Nicknames: Galletti (The Cockerels), Biancorossi (The Red & White)
- Short name: Forlì
- Founded: 1919; 107 years ago as Unione Sportiva Forti e Liberi; 2007; 19 years ago as Associazione Sportiva Dilettantistica Nuovo Forlì 1919
- Ground: Stadio Tullo Morgagni
- Capacity: 3,385
- President: Gianfranco Cappelli
- Head coach: Nicola Campedelli
- League: Serie C Group B
- 2025–26: Serie C Group B, 12th of 20
- Website: www.forlifc.com
| Home colours | Away colours | Third colours |

Forlì Football Club, commonly known as Forlì (pronounced [forˈli]), is an Italian football club based in Forlì, Emilia-Romagna, who compete in Serie C, the third tier of the Italian football league system.

== History ==
=== From the foundation to 2007 ===
Old logo

The original club, called Foot-Ball Club Forlì, was founded in 1919, and was last in Serie B of Northern Italy in 1947. Later, the name changed into Associazione Calcio Forlì. Forlì placed last in 2005–06 Serie C2 season, being relegated to Serie D, but was excluded by the federation because of financial troubles. The historical club was put in the Terza Categoria division with the new name ASD Nuovo Forlì 1919.

=== From 2007 to today ===
In July 2007 football in Forlì was reborn as Football Club Forlì Dilettantistica which became the heir of the old F.C. Forlì, with the acquisition of sports title of the former second club of the city: the ASD AC Sporting Forlì.

After a season in Promozione, two in Eccellenza and two in Serie D in 2012 the club was promoted to Lega Pro Seconda Divisione.

== Colors and badge ==
Its colors are white and red.

== Current squad ==
As of 11 September 2026

Note: Flags indicate national team as defined under FIFA eligibility rules; some limited exceptions apply. Players may hold more than one non-FIFA nationality.

| No. | Pos. | Nation | Player |
|---|---|---|---|
| 1 | GK | ITA | Alessandro Tagliaferri |
| 2 | DF | ITA | Nicola Mandrelli |
| 4 | MF | ITA | Filippo Valentini |
| 5 | MF | ITA | Riccardo Gaiola |
| 6 | MF | ITA | Carlo De Risio |
| 7 | FW | ITA | Elia Petrelli |
| 8 | MF | ITA | Manuel Rosetti |
| 9 | FW | ITA | Valentino Coveri |
| 10 | FW | ITA | Davide Macrì |
| 11 | FW | ITA | Nicola Farinelli |
| 12 | GK | ITA | Daniel Theiner |
| 14 | DF | ITA | Gioele Locatelli |
| 15 | DF | ITA | Federico Valentini |
| 17 | DF | ITA | Alessandro Spinelli |
| 18 | FW | ITA | Giovanni Perini (on loan from Cesena) |
| 19 | FW | ITA | Tommaso Gabellini (on loan from Torino) |

| No. | Pos. | Nation | Player |
|---|---|---|---|
| 21 | MF | ITA | Giovanni Mattioli |
| 22 | GK | ITA | Luca Martelli |
| 23 | MF | ITA | Jacopo Scaccabarozzi |
| 24 | DF | ITA | Matteo Attasi |
| 25 | DF | ITA | Luca Cappelli |
| 26 | DF | ITA | Luigi Palomba (on loan from Virtus Entella) |
| 30 | MF | ITA | Gabriele Perretta |
| 33 | DF | ITA | Diego Rossi |
| 34 | GK | ALB | Giulio Veliaj |
| 35 | DF | ITA | Saer Diop |
| 36 | DF | ITA | Matteo Onofri (on loan from Spezia) |
| 77 | FW | ITA | Patrizio Zerbo |
| 95 | DF | ITA | Luca Munaretti |
| 99 | FW | ITA | Nicolò Tordiglione |
| — | DF | ITA | Filippo Ercolani |

=== Out on loan ===
Note: Flags indicate national team as defined under FIFA eligibility rules; some limited exceptions apply. Players may hold more than one non-FIFA nationality.

| No. / Pos. / Nation / Player; — / DF / ITA / Nicolò Greco (at Mestre until 30 June 2027) | No. / Pos. / Nation / Player; — / MF / ITA / Nicola Berti (at Progresso until 30 June 2027) |
