= Castellucchio =

Castellucchio Castlüch (Emilian)
- Comune
- Comune di Castellucchio
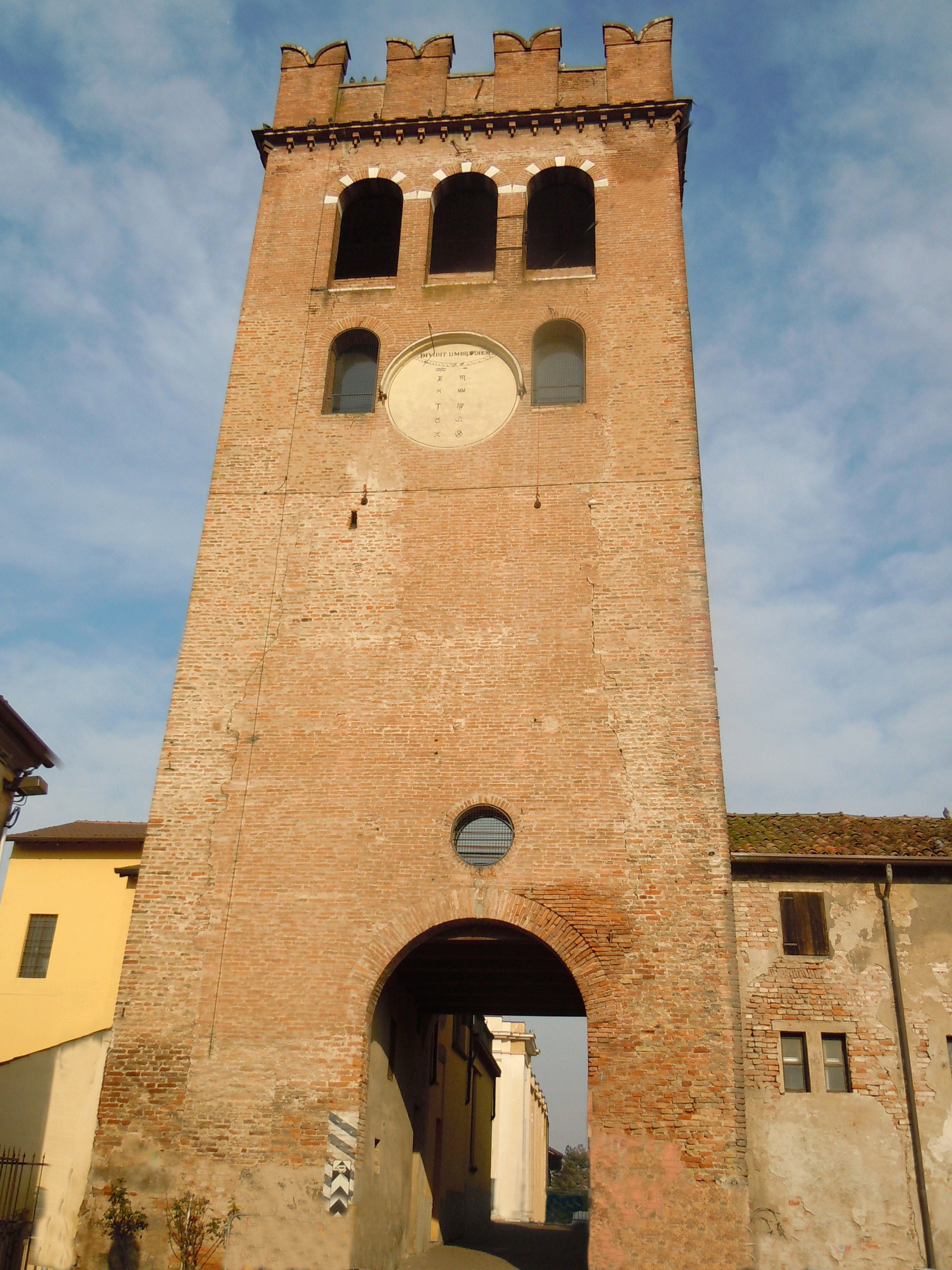
- Castle-Tower.

- Coat of arms

- Location within Italy Location within Lombardy
- Coordinates: 45°9′N 10°39′E
- Country: Italy
- Region: Lombardy
- Province: Mantua (MN)
- Frazioni: Sarginesco, Ospitaletto Mantovano, Gabbiana, San Lorenzo

Government
  - Mayor: Romano Monicelli

Area
  - Total: 46.5 km^{2} (18.0 sq mi)

Population (1 April 2009)
  - Total: 5,064
  - Density: 109/km^{2} (282/sq mi)
- Demonym: Castellucchiesi
- Time zone: UTC+1 (CET)
  - Summer (DST): UTC+2 (CEST)
- Postal code: 46014
- Dialing code: 0376
- Website: Official website

Castellucchio (Mantovano: Castlüch) is a comune (municipality) in the Province of Mantua in the Italian region Lombardy, located about 120 kilometres (75 mi) southeast of Milan and about 12 kilometres (7 mi) west of Mantua.

Castellucchio borders the following municipalities: Curtatone, Gazoldo degli Ippoliti, Marcaria, Rodigo.

== Notable people ==
- Roberto Montorsi (born 1951), former footballer
