= Cesare Pogliano =

Italian footballer (born 1998)

Personal information
- Date of birth: 8 January 1998 (age 28)
- Place of birth: Mantua, Italy
- Height: 1.90 m (6 ft 3 in)
- Position: Defender

Team information
- Current team: Pro Patria
- Number: 33

Youth career
- –2018: Chievo

Senior career*
| Years | Team | Apps | (Gls) |
| 2017–2019 | Chievo | 0 | (0) |
| 2018–2019 | → Reggina (loan) | 8 | (0) |
| 2019–2021 | Novara | 42 | (1) |
| 2021–2022 | Cesena | 17 | (0) |
| 2022–2026 | Lumezzane | 89 | (3) |
| 2026– | Pro Patria | 11 | (0) |
- * Club domestic league appearances and goals as of 25 April 2026

Cesare Pogliano (born 8 January 1998) is an Italian footballer who plays as a defender for Serie D club Pro Patria.

== Club career ==
=== Chievo ===
He played for the Under-19 squad of Chievo in Campionato Primavera 1 from the 2015–16 season through to 2017–18. He made several bench appearances for Chievo's senior squad at the tail end of the 2016–17 Serie A season, but did not see playing time.

==== Loan to Reggina ====
On 9 July 2018, Pogliano joined Serie C club Reggina on a season-long loan. He made his professional debut in Serie C for Reggina on 18 September 2018 in a game against Trapani as an 88th-minute substitute for Alex Redolfi. On 23 December he played his first entire match for the team, a 2–0 home win over Vibonese.

=== Novara ===
On 16 July 2019, he signed a 3-year contract with Novara.

=== Cesena ===
On 7 September 2021, he signed a one-year deal with Cesena.

== Career statistics ==
=== Club ===
As of match played 22 December 2021

Appearances and goals by club, season and competition
| Club | Season | League | | | National Cup | | League Cup | | Other | | Total | |
| Club | Season | Division | Apps | Goals | Apps | Goals | Apps | Goals | Apps | Goals | Apps | Goals |
|---|---|---|---|---|---|---|---|---|---|---|---|---|
| Chievo | 2017–18 | Serie A | 0 | 0 | 0 | 0 | — | | — | | 0 | 0 |
| Reggina (loan) | 2018–19 | Serie C | 8 | 0 | 0 | 0 | 0 | 0 | 1 (Note: Appearance(s) in Promotion Playoffs) | 0 | 9 | 0 |
| Novara | 2019–20 | Serie C | 18 | 1 | 0 | 0 | 1 | 0 | 3 | 0 | 22 | 1 |
| Novara | 2020–21 | Serie C | 24 | 0 | 1 | 0 | — | | — | | 25 | 0 |
| Novara | Total | | 42 | 1 | 1 | 0 | 1 | 0 | 3 | 0 | 47 | 1 |
| Cesena | 2021–22 | Serie C | 7 | 0 | 0 | 0 | 1 | 0 | — | | 8 | 0 |
| Career total | | | 57 | 1 | 1 | 0 | 2 | 0 | 4 | 0 | 64 | 0 |
