= Gabriele Perretta =

Italian footballer

Personal information
- Date of birth: 14 January 2000 (age 26)
- Place of birth: Pontedera, Italy
- Height: 1.81 m (5 ft 11 in)
- Position: Midfielder

Team information
- Current team: Forlì
- Number: 30

Youth career
- Empoli

Senior career*
Years	Team	Apps	(Gls)
2019–2020	Empoli	0	(0)
2019–2020	→ Arzignano (loan)	25	(0)
2020–2026	Pontedera	206	(6)
2026	→ Cittadella (loan)	11	(1)
2026–	Forlì	0	(0)
- * Club domestic league appearances and goals as of 29 April 2026

Gabriele Perretta (born 14 January 2000) is an Italian professional footballer who plays as a midfielder for Serie C Group B club Forlì.

== Career ==
Born in Pontedera, Perretta started his career in Empoli youth sector.

On 19 July 2019, he was loaned to Serie C club Arzignano. He made his professional debut on 25 August against Piacenza.

On 10 August 2020, Perretta left Empoli and signed with Pontedera. On 6 November 2021, he scored a goal in Tuscany derby to Grosseto.
