= Luca Zamparo =

Italian footballer

Personal information
- Date of birth: 19 November 1994 (age 31)
- Place of birth: Latisana, Italy
- Height: 1.90 m (6 ft 3 in)
- Position: Forward

Team information
- Current team: Alcione Milano (on loan from Vicenza)
- Number: 30

Youth career
- 2010–2011: Portogruaro
- 2011: Triestina
- 2012–2014: Varese

Senior career*
Years	Team	Apps	(Gls)
2012	Triestina	6	(0)
2012–2014	Varese	0	(0)
2014–2015	Feralpisalò	12	(2)
2015–2016	Varesina	30	(4)
2016–2017	Borgogesia	32	(18)
2017–2018	Cuneo	40	(8)
2018–2019	Reggiana	34	(24)
2019–2020	Parma	0	(0)
2019–2020	→ Rimini (loan)	17	(4)
2020	→ Reggiana (loan)	7	(7)
2020–2022	Reggiana	63	(19)
2022–2024	Virtus Entella	52	(13)
2024	→ Padova (loan)	17	(1)
2024–	Vicenza	19	(2)
2025	→ Torres (loan)	14	(0)
2025–	→ Alcione Milano (loan)	9	(1)
- * Club domestic league appearances and goals as of 29 April 2026

Luca Zamparo (born 19 November 1994) is an Italian professional footballer who plays as a forward for Serie C Group A club Alcione Milano, on loan from Vicenza.

== Club career ==
He made his professional Serie C debut for Triestina on 25 March 2012 in a game against Südtirol.

He played the first 9 seasons of his senior career in Serie C and Serie D.

After becoming the second-best goalscorer in 2018–19 Serie D group D and helping his team Reggiana with promotion to Serie C, on 10 July 2019 he signed a 3-year contract with Serie A club Parma, who immediately loaned him to Serie C club Rimini.

On 8 January 2020, Parma announced that the loan to Rimini has been terminated and he has been loaned back to Reggiana for the rest of the season. The loan contract contained the obligation for Reggiana to purchase his rights which were activated after his first league appearance for them.

On 5 August 2022, Zamparo moved to Virtus Entella. On 15 January 2024, he was loaned by Padova.

On 1 July 2024, Zamparo signed a two-year contract with Vicenza.
