= Giorgio Galli (footballer) =

Italian footballer

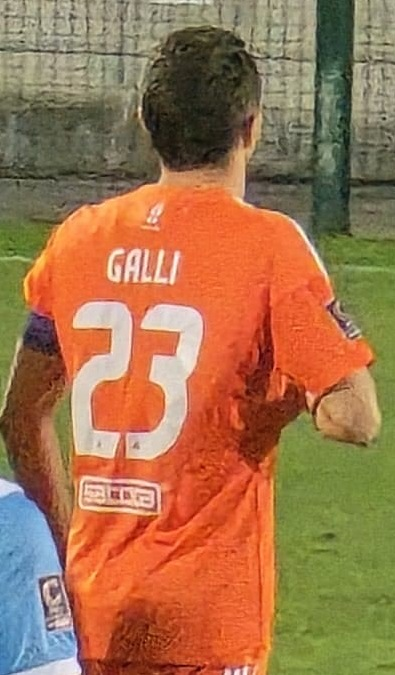

Personal information
- Date of birth: 11 February 1996 (age 30)
- Place of birth: Como, Italy
- Height: 1.81 m (5 ft 11 in)
- Position: Midfielder

Team information
- Current team: Alcione
- Number: 23

Youth career
- 2008–2014: Monza

Senior career*
Years	Team	Apps	(Gls)
2014–2017	Caronnese	78	(7)
2017–2020	Monza	65	(0)
2020–2025	Lecco	90	(2)
2025	Lucchese	10	(0)
2025–	Alcione	31	(0)
- * Club domestic league appearances and goals as of 29 April 2026

Giorgio Galli (born 11 February 1996) is an Italian professional footballer who plays as a midfielder for Serie C Group A club Alcione.

== Club career ==
Starting his youth career at Monza, Galli first began his senior career in the Serie D at Caronnese during the 2014–15 season. In three years at the club, Galli played 81 games and scored seven goals. In 2017 he returned to Serie C club Monza, where he played 76 games, helping Monza gain promotion to the Serie B in 2019–20. On 25 August 2020, Galli joined Serie C club Lecco.

== Honours ==
Monza

- Serie C Group A: 2019–20
