= Francesco Galuppini =

Italian footballer

Personal information
- Date of birth: 17 October 1993 (age 33)
- Place of birth: Brescia, Italy
- Height: 1.81 m (5 ft 11 in)
- Position: Forward

Team information
- Current team: Ospitaletto (on loan from Ascoli)

Youth career
- Urago Mella
- –2012: Lumezzane
- 2009–2011: → Sampdoria (loan)
- 2011–2012: → Chievo (loan)

Senior career*
| Years | Team | Apps | (Gls) |
| 2012–2015 | Lumezzane | 31 | (4) |
| 2014–2015 | → Real Vicenza (loan) | 18 | (1) |
| 2015 | → Feralpisalò (loan) | 14 | (3) |
| 2015–2016 | Piacenza | 25 | (5) |
| 2016–2017 | Ciliverghe Mazzano | 32 | (22) |
| 2017–2019 | Parma | 0 | (0) |
| 2017 | → Modena (loan) | 6 | (0) |
| 2017–2018 | → Cuneo (loan) | 21 | (0) |
| 2018–2019 | → Ravenna (loan) | 37 | (6) |
| 2019–2022 | Renate | 82 | (37) |
| 2022–2023 | Südtirol | 15 | (0) |
| 2022–2023 | → Novara (loan) | 34 | (10) |
| 2023–2026 | Mantova | 80 | (16) |
| 2026– | Ascoli | 15 | (3) |
| 2026– | → Ospitaletto (loan) | 0 | (0) |
- * Club domestic league appearances and goals as of 30 April 2026

Francesco Galuppini (born 17 October 1993) is an Italian footballer who plays as a forward for Serie C Group A club Ospitaletto on loan from Ascoli.

== Club career ==
He made his Serie C debut for Lumezzane on 2 September 2012 in a game against Reggiana.

On 9 July 2019, he was sold by Parma to Renate.

On 20 January 2022, he signed a contract with Südtirol until 30 June 2024. On 21 July 2022, Galuppini was loaned to Novara.

On 27 July 2023, Galuppini moved to Mantova on a two-year contract.
