= Carlos Freitas =

Portuguese footballer

Personal information
- Full name: Carlos Manuel Ribeiro Freitas
- Date of birth: 20 January 1994 (age 32)
- Place of birth: Guimarães, Portugal
- Height: 1.77 m (5 ft 9 1/2 in)
- Position: Right-back

Team information
- Current team: O Elvas
- Number: 27

Youth career
- 2005–2013: Vitória Guimarães

Senior career*
Years	Team	Apps	(Gls)
2013–2015	Felgueiras 1932	46	(0)
2015–2016	Limianos	25	(2)
2016–2017	Olhanense	16	(0)
2017	Freamunde	13	(0)
2017–2018	Pedras Salgadas	15	(1)
2018–2019	Felgueiras 1932	1	(0)
2019	Pedras Salgadas	16	(1)
2019–2022	AD Fafe	65	(0)
2022–2024	Länk Vilaverdense	41	(0)
2024–2025	AD Marco	29	(0)
2025–	O Elvas	9	(0)
- * Club domestic league appearances and goals as of 18:36, 24 December 2025 (UTC)

Carlos Manuel Ribeiro Freitas (born 20 January 1994) is a Portuguese professional footballer who plays as a right-back for Campeonato de Portugal club O Elvas.

== Football career ==
On 31 July 2016, Freitas made his professional debut with Olhanense in a 2016–17 Taça da Liga match against Varzim.
