= Alcione Milano =

Italian football club

Alcione
- Full name: Alcione Milano; Società Sportiva a r.l.
- Nickname: Orange
- Founded: 1952
- Ground: Stadio Ernesto Breda, Sesto San Giovanni, Italy
- Capacity: 3,523
- Chairman: Marcello Montini
- Manager: Giovanni Cusatis
- League: Serie C Group A
- 2025–26: Serie C Group A, 8th of 20
Home colours	Away colours	Third colours

Alcione Milano Società Sportiva, commonly known as Alcione Milano or just Alcione, is an Italian association football club from Milan, Lombardy. They currently play in the Serie C Group A league.

== History ==
Former logo (until 2024)

The club was founded in 1952. As one of the historical amateur clubs of Milan with a state-of-the-art youth system, Alcione was chaired throughout the years by renowned people such as former Inter Milan chairman Ernesto Pellegrini and former Milan mayor Carlo Tognoli.

Alcione were promoted to Serie D for the first time in 2021. Two years later, after finishing the 2022–23 Serie D regular season in second place behind Lumezzane, they won the promotion playoff tournament under the guidance of head coach Giovanni Cusatis.

By the end of the season, Alcione was announced to be at the top of the table of potential teams to be admitted in the 2023–24 Serie C in case of a vacancy, and that they would be playing their home games at the Arena Civica in case. However, the Serie C committee eventually rejected the request of readmission due to the Arena Civica not been deemed as suitable for league games.

On 21 April 2024, Alcione won promotion to Serie C after mathematically winning the Group A title of the 2023–24 Serie D with two games to go.

== Players ==
=== Current squad ===
As of 11 September 2026

Note: Flags indicate national team as defined under FIFA eligibility rules; some limited exceptions apply. Players may hold more than one non-FIFA nationality.

No.	Pos.	Nation	Player
1	GK	ITA	Francesco Raffaelli (on loan from Bologna)
2	DF	FRA	Sandro Baldacchino
3	DF	ITA	Paolo Chierichetti
4	DF	ITA	Armando Miculi
5	DF	ITA	Edoardo Sadotti (on loan from Fiorentina)
6	DF	ITA	Daniele Ciappellano
7	FW	ITA	Luca Zamparo
8	MF	ITA	Mattia Muroni
10	FW	FRA	Jonathan Pitou
11	FW	ITA	Fabio Morselli
14	FW	ITA	Alex Rolfini
16	MF	ITA	Jacopo Lanzi
17	MF	ITA	Andrea Braida
18	MF	FRA	Emerick Lopes
19	DF	ITA	Niccolò Trapani (on loan from Fiorentina)

No.	Pos.	Nation	Player
20	MF	ITA	Giorgio Puzzoli
21	MF	ITA	Samuele Parlati
23	MF	ITA	Giorgio Galli
25	DF	ITA	Filippo Pirola
27	MF	ITA	Mattia Lione
30	MF	ITA	Riccardo Rebaudo
31	FW	ITA	Michele Marconi
56	MF	ITA	Davide Andreassi
67	MF	ITA	Tommaso Mocchi
69	GK	ITA	Lapo Nava (on loan from Cremonese)
81	MF	ITA	Filippo Gallazzi
94	DF	ITA	Filippo Bertolotti
96	FW	ITA	Simone Palombi
98	FW	ITA	Lorenzo Zini
