= Stefano Amadio =

Italian footballer (born 1989)

Personal information
- Date of birth: 5 January 1989 (age 37)
- Place of birth: Rome, Italy
- Height: 1.76 m (5 ft 9 in)
- Position: Midfielder

Team information
- Current team: Montesilvano

Senior career*
Years	Team	Apps	(Gls)
2008–2010	Cisco Roma	36	(1)
2010	Alghero	1	(0)
2010–2012	Chieti	58	(1)
2012–2014	Aprilia	61	(1)
2014–2016	Teramo	65	(4)
2016–2017	Latina	5	(0)
2017	→ Teramo (loan)	19	(0)
2017–2018	Teramo	24	(1)
2018–2020	Pineto	39	(1)
2020–2021	Fano	49	(0)
2021–2023	Latina	58	(0)
2023–2026	Pineto	59	(0)
2026–	Montesilvano		
- * Club domestic league appearances and goals as of 26 April 2026

Stefano Amadio (born 5 January 1989) is an Italian professional footballer who plays as a midfielder for Eccellenza club Montesilvano.

== Career ==
He made his Serie C debut for Teramo on 17 September 2014 in a game against Ancona.

On 10 January 2020, he signed a 1.5-year contract with Serie C club Fano.

On 11 July 2023, he returned to Pineto.
