= Giovanni Cusatis =

Italian footballer and coach

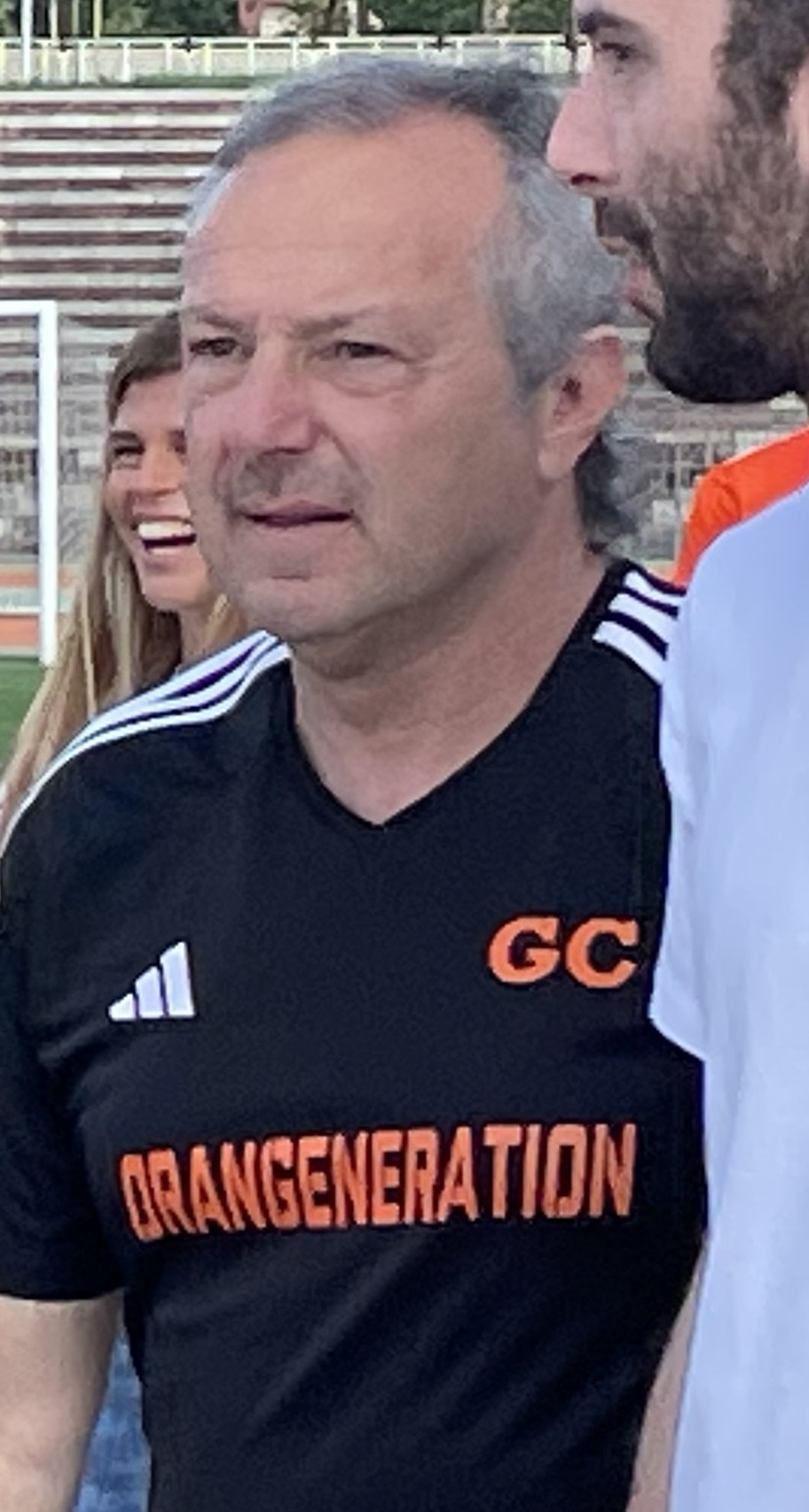

Personal information
- Full name: Giovanni Cusatis
- Date of birth: 1 February 1967 (age 59)
- Place of birth: Milan, Italy
- Position: Midfielder

Team information
- Current team: Alcione (head coach)

Youth career
- Pro Lissone

Senior career*
Years	Team	Apps	(Gls)
1985–1986	Pro Lissone		
1986–1987	Solbiatese		
1987–1988	Pavia		
1988–1989	Teramo	32	(2)
1989–1991	Casarano		
1991–1992	Siracusa	31	(3)
1992–1994	Novara	27+	(0+)
1994–1998	Legnano	96	(1)
1998–2000	Oggiono		
2000–2001	Pro Lissone		

Managerial career
- 2005–2006: Como (technique coach)
- 2006–2007: Caronnese
- 2008–2009: Legnano (assistant)
- 2009–2011: Pro Patria (assistant)
- 2011–2002: Pro Patria
- 2012–2013: Alessandria
- 2013–2014: Watford (assistant)
- 2014–2015: Catania (assistant)
- 2015: Carpi (technique coach)
- 2016–2017: Fano
- 2017–2018: Milano City
- 2018–2019: Levadiakos (assistant)
- 2020: Legnano
- 2021–: Alcione
- * Club domestic league appearances and goals

Giovanni Cusatis (born 1 February 1967) is a retired Italian football player, now a coach, currently in charge of Serie C Group A club Alcione.

== Playing career ==
Cusatis began playing football in Pro Lissone, in Lombardia regional leagues; he spent almost all of his career in Serie C1 and C2.

He played both as a center midfielder and winger.

=== Coaching career ===
In 2005, he entered Giacomo Gattuso's staff; then he trained Caronnese and later joined Attilio Lombardo at Legnano.

In 2011–12 he had been hired by Pro Patria as head coach: the team, which had to recuperate an 11 points-deduction due to financial irregularities, ended the tournament at a remarkable 7th place (could have been the winner if it wasn't for the amends).

In 2012–13 season he signed for Alessandria, in Lega Pro Seconda Divisione.

On 18 December 2013, Cusatis was confirmed as one of Giuseppe Sannino's new assistant coaches at Watford.

In 2021, Cusatis took over at Alcione in the Serie D league. With them, he ended the club's 2022–23 Serie D campaign in second place and then won the resulting playoff tournament; however, the club was not admitted to Serie C in the end due to stadium regulations. He then won promotion to Serie C in 2024, being successively confirmed for Alcione's debut season in professionalism.

== Bibliography ==
- Almanacco illustrato del Calcio, editions 1990–1999, Modena, Panini.
