= Stadio Ernesto Breda =

Multi-use stadium in Sesto San Giovanni, Italy

Coordinates: 45°32′2″N 9°13′11″E

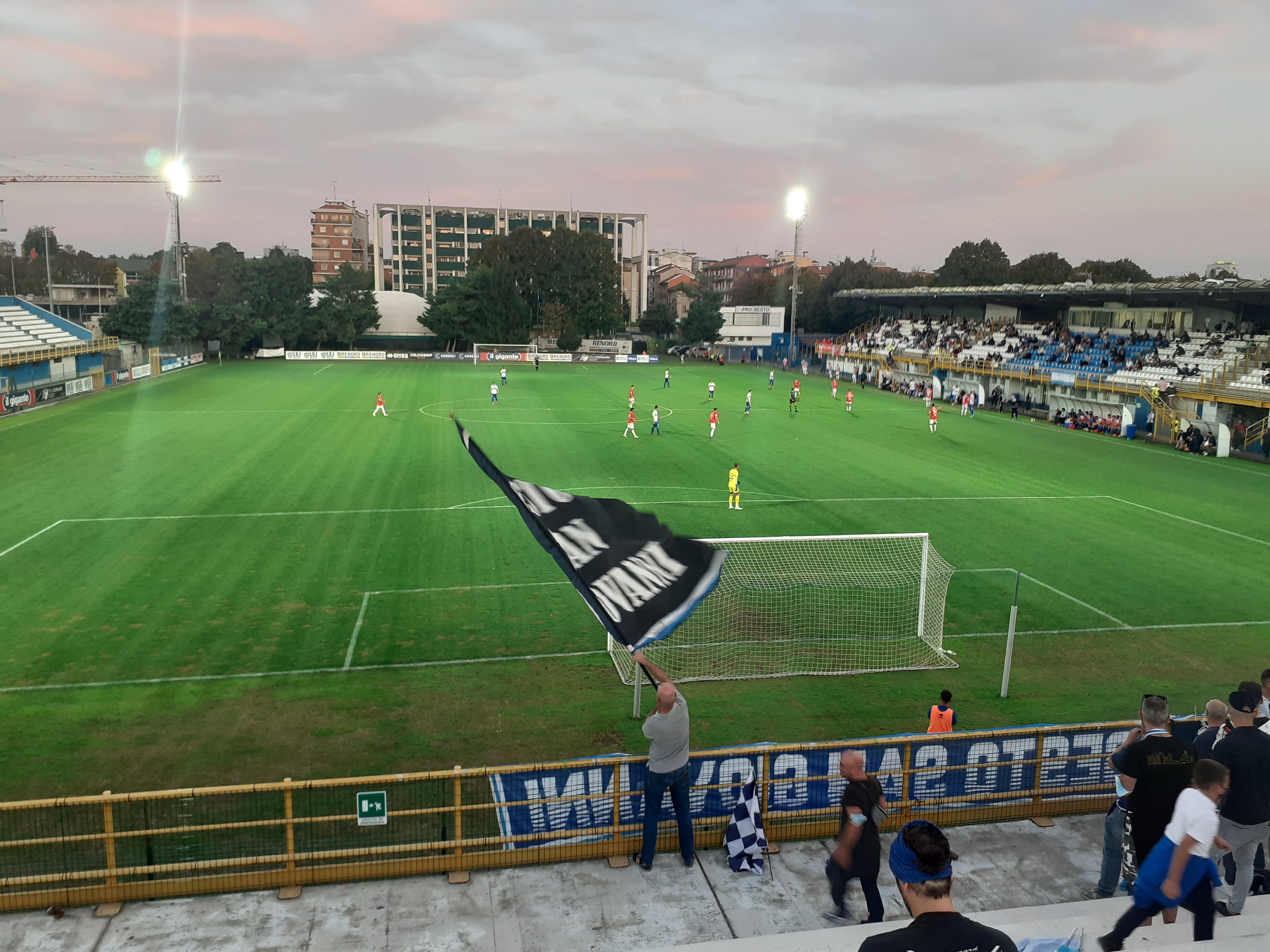
- Interactive map of Stadio Ernesto Breda
- Location: Via XX Settembre, 162; 20099 Sesto San Giovanni, Metropolitan City of Milan, Lombardy, Italy
- Owner: Ente Parco Nord Milano
- Capacity: 3,523
- Executive suites: 30
- Surface: Grass; 105 x 65 m

Construction
- Opened: 1939
- Renovated: 1988

Tenants
- Pro Sesto; Alcione Milano; Inter Milan Women; Inter Milan Primavera; Inter Milan U23

Stadio Ernesto Breda is a multi-use stadium in Sesto San Giovanni, Italy. It is currently used for both football and American football matches and it's the home ground of Pro Sesto, Alcione Milano, Inter Milan Women and Inter Milan Primavera. The stadium holds 3,523 spectators.
