= Davide Ferri =

Italian footballer (born 2002)

Personal information
- Full name: Davide Ferri
- Date of birth: 19 September 2002 (age 24)
- Place of birth: Italy
- Height: 2.00 m (6 ft 7 in)
- Position: Midfielder

Team information
- Current team: Pro Patria
- Number: 25

Youth career
- Pro Patria

Senior career*
Years	Team	Apps	(Gls)
2019–	Pro Patria	176	(5)
- * Club domestic league appearances and goals as of 30 April 2026

Davide Ferri (born 19 September 2002) is an Italian professional footballer who plays as a midfielder for Serie D club Pro Patria.

== Club career ==
A product of Pro Patria’s youth system, Ferri was promoted to the first team in 2019. On 2 July 2021, he renew his contract with the club.
