= Mattia Muroni =

Italian footballer

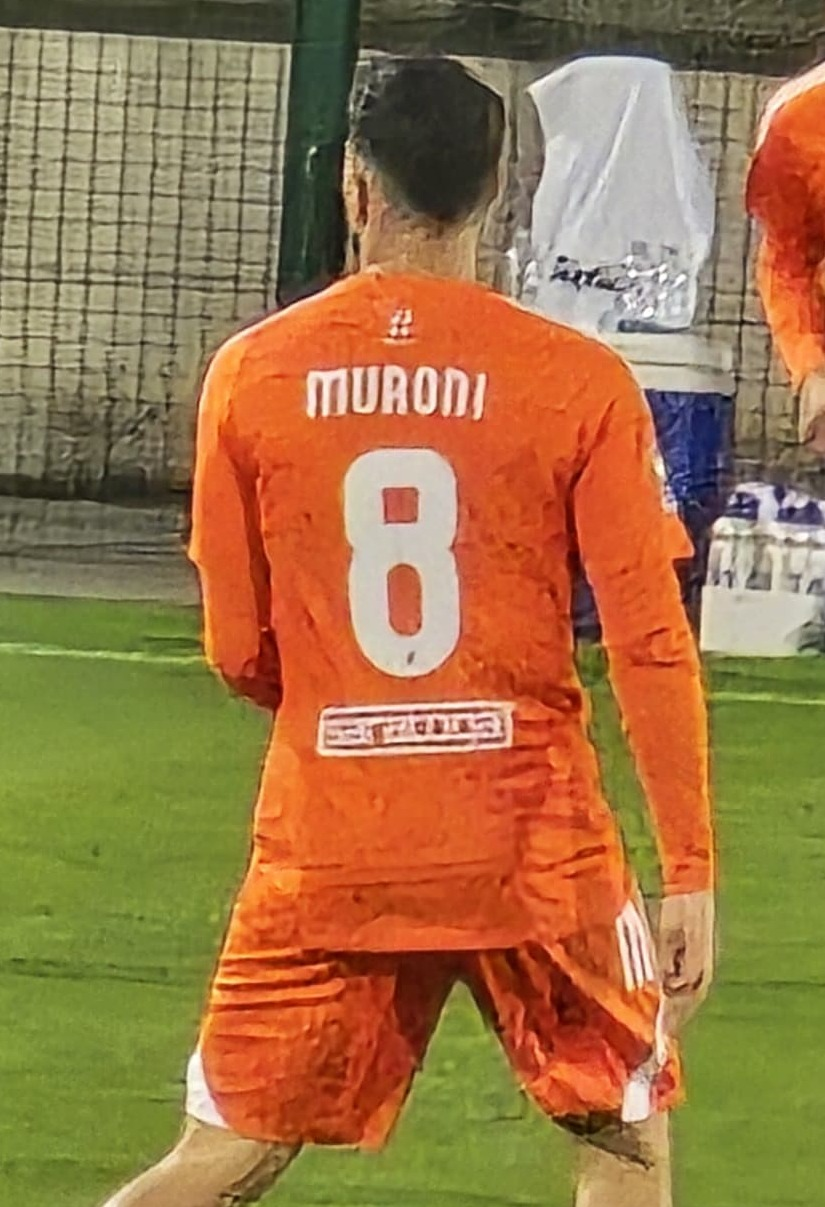

Personal information
- Date of birth: 6 April 1996 (age 30)
- Place of birth: Oristano, Italy
- Height: 1.76 m (5 ft 9 in)
- Position: Midfielder

Team information
- Current team: Alcione Milano
- Number: 8

Youth career
- Cagliari

Senior career*
Years	Team	Apps	(Gls)
2015–2016	Cagliari	0	(0)
2015–2016	→ Tuttocuoio (loan)	18	(0)
2016–2020	Olbia	118	(1)
2020–2021	Modena	40	(6)
2021–2023	Reggiana	48	(1)
2023–2025	Mantova	35	(4)
2025–	Alcione Milano	20	(2)
- * Club domestic league appearances and goals as of 29 April 2026

Mattia Muroni (born 6 April 1996) is an Italian professional footballer who plays as a midfielder for Serie C Group A club Alcione Milano.

== Career ==
Born in Oristano, Muroni started his career in Cagliari youth sector. In July 2015, he was loaned to Serie C club Tuttocuoio. Muroni made his professional debut on 6 September against Rimini.

For the 2016–17 season, he left Cagliari and signed with Olbia. On 4 May 2019, he played his 100 match for the club against Pro Vercelli. Muroni played four seasons for Olbia.

On 11 January 2020, he moved to Modena.

On 15 July 2021, he signed with Reggiana.

On 28 July 2023, Muroni joined Mantova on a two-year deal.
