= Stadio Danilo Martelli =

Stadium in Mantua, Italy

Coordinates: 45°8′46″N 10°47′39″E

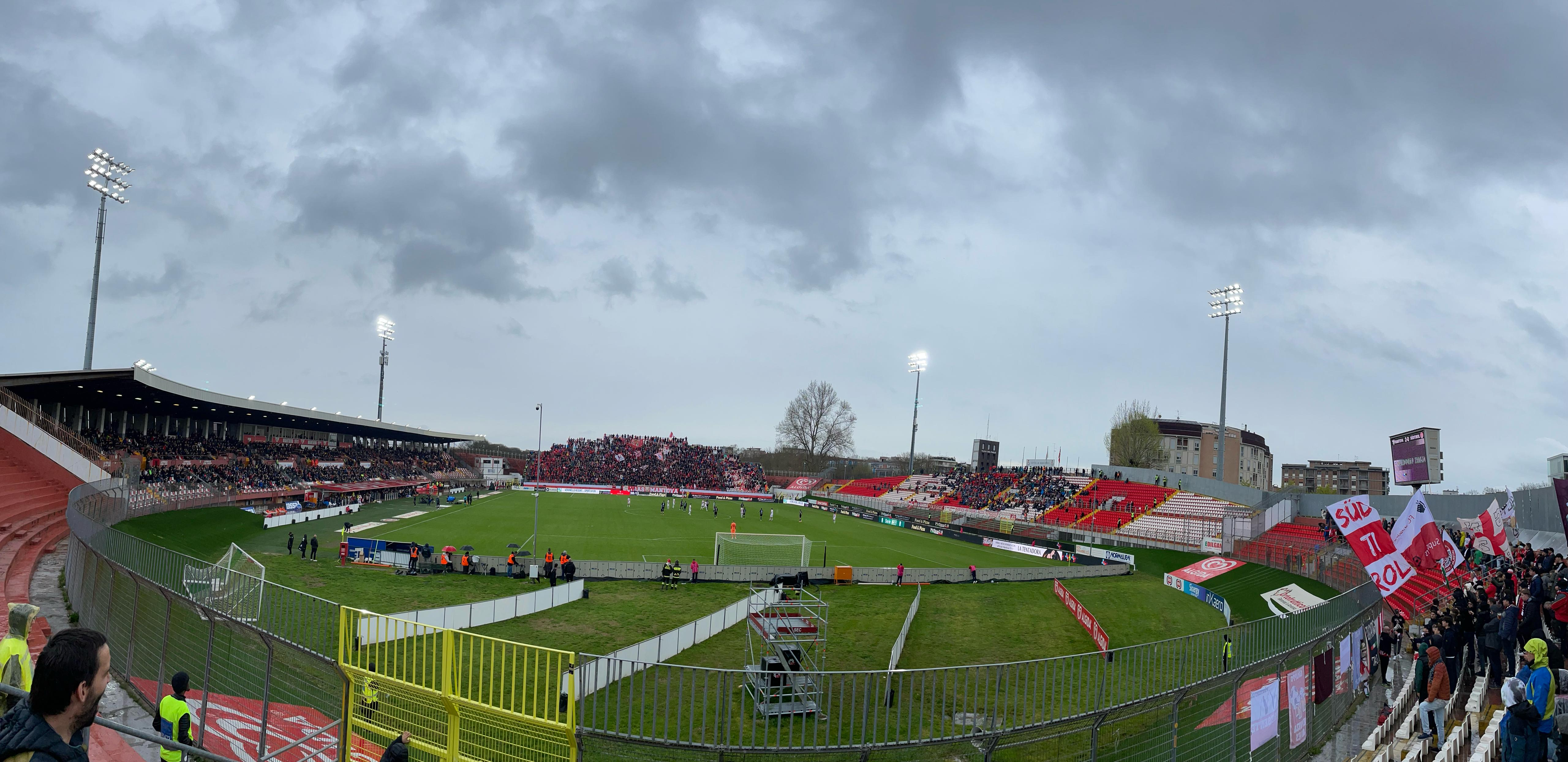
- Interactive map of Stadio Danilo Martelli
- Location: Mantua, Italy
- Owner: Municipality of Mantua
- Capacity: 14,884
- Surface: Grass

Construction
- Groundbreaking: 1947
- Opened: 1949
- Renovated: 2005

Tenant
- A.C. Mantova

Stadio Danilo Martelli is the main stadium in Mantua, Italy. It is named Danilo Martelli, a Mantuan footballer from the 1940s, who died in the Superga air disaster of 1949. It is currently used mostly for football matches and, on occasion, for concerts. It is the home of A.C. Mantova.
