= 2023–24 AS Cittadella season =

AS Cittadella
2023–24 season
- Manager: Edoardo Gorini
- Stadium: Stadio Pier Cesare Tombolato
- Serie B: 8th
- Coppa Italia: Round of 32
Home colours	Away colours	Third colours

The 2023–24 season is AS Cittadella's 51st season in existence and the club's eighth consecutive season in the top flight of Italian football. In addition to the domestic league, Cittadella will participate in this season's edition of the Coppa Italia. The season covers the period from 1 July 2023 to 30 June 2024.

== Players ==
=== First-team squad ===
As of 17 October 2023

Note: Flags indicate national team as defined under FIFA eligibility rules; some limited exceptions apply. Players may hold more than one non-FIFA nationality.

No.	Pos.	Nation	Player
1	GK	ITA	Filippo Veneran
2	DF	ITA	Alessandro Salvi
4	DF	ITA	Matteo Angeli
5	MF	ITA	Valerio Mastrantonio
6	DF	ITA	Edoardo Sottini
7	FW	ITA	Luca Pandolfi
8	MF	ITA	Francesco Amatucci
9	FW	ITA	Andrea Magrassi
10	FW	ITA	Claudio Cassano
11	FW	ITA	Filippo Pittarello
15	DF	ITA	Domenico Frare
16	MF	ITA	Alessio Vita
17	MF	DEN	Emil Kornvig
18	MF	ITA	Andrea Tessiore
20	MF	ITA	Giuseppe Carriero

No.	Pos.	Nation	Player
21	MF	ITA	Nicholas Saggionetto
23	MF	ITA	Simone Branca (vice-captain)
24	DF	ITA	Lorenzo Carissoni
26	MF	ITA	Nicola Pavan (3rd captain)
27	MF	ITA	Andrea Danzi
28	DF	ITA	Alessio Rizza
30	DF	ITA	Stefano Negro
32	FW	ITA	Tommy Maistrello
36	GK	ALB	Elhan Kastrati (4th captain)
64	DF	ITA	Andrea Cecchetto
74	FW	ITA	Ahmed Kader Sanogo
77	GK	ITA	Luca Maniero
92	FW	ITA	Enrico Baldini
98	DF	ITA	Federico Giraudo (on loan from Reggina)

=== Out on loan ===
Note: Flags indicate national team as defined under FIFA eligibility rules; some limited exceptions apply. Players may hold more than one non-FIFA nationality.

No.	Pos.	Nation	Player
—	DF	ITA	Vincenzo Ciriello (at Picerno until 30 June 2024)

== Transfers ==
=== In ===
Pos.	Player	Transferred from	Fee	Date	Source
DF	(Italy) Lorenzo Carissoni	(Italy) Latina	Free	1 July 2023	
MF	(Italy) Andrea Tessiore	(Italy) Triestina	Free	1 July 2023	
DF	(Italy) Edoardo Sottini	(Italy) Internazionale		3 July 2023	
MF	(Italy) Francesco Amatucci	(Italy) Montevarchi	Free	5 July 2023	
FW	(Italy) Filippo Pittarello	(Italy) Cesena	€100k	7 July 2023	
DF	(Italy) Matteo Angeli	(Italy) Bologna	Free	7 July 2023	
DF	(Italy) Alessio Rizza	(Italy) Empoli		24 July 2023	
MF	(Denmark) Emil Kornvig	(Italy) Spezia		1 August 2023	
MF	(Italy) Claudio Cassano	(Italy) Roma U19	€200k	3 August 2023	
FW	(Italy) Luca Pandolfi	(Italy) Cosenza	Free	10 August 2023	
FW	(Italy) Ahmed Sanogo	(Italy) Vis Pesaro		1 September 2023	
DF	(Italy) Stefano Negro	Unattached	Free	17 October 2023	

=== Out ===
Pos.	Player	Transferred to	Fee	Date	Source
MF	(Italy) Mirko Antonucci	(Italy) Spezia	€1.70m	1 July 2023	
FW	(Italy) Luigi Cuppone	(Italy) Pescara	€80k	1 July 2023	
MF	(Uruguay) Ignacio Lores	(Italy) Avellino	Free	1 July 2023	
MF	(Italy) Daniele Donnarumma	(Italy) Cesena	Free	1 July 2023	
DF	(Italy) Dario Del Fabro	(Switzerland) Yverdon-Sport	Free	1 July 2023	
MF	(Italy) Camillo Tavernelli	(Italy) Casertana	Free	1 July 2023	
MF	(Italy) Simone Icardi	(Italy) Ostiamare	Free	1 July 2023	
DF	(Italy) Romano Perticone	(Italy) Treviso	Free	1 July 2023	
FW	(Spain) Raúl Asencio	(Italy) Potenza		1 July 2023	
DF	(Italy) Gian Filippo Felicioli	(Italy) Pergolettese		1 July 2023	
FW	(Senegal) Mamadou Tounkara	(Italy) Avellino		1 July 2023	
DF	(Italy) Vincenzo Ciriello	(Italy) Picerno		15 July 2023	
GK	(Italy) Filippo Manfrin	(Italy) Sangiuliano		18 July 2023	
MF	(Guinea-Bissau) Carlos Embaló	(Italy) Foggia		1 September 2023	
DF	(Italy) Alessandro Mattioli	(Italy) Vis Pesaro		1 September 2023	

== Competitions ==
=== Overview ===
Competition	First match	Last match	Starting round	Record							
Competition	First match	Last match	Starting round	Pld	W	D	L	GF	GA	GD	Win %
Serie B	20 August 2023	10 May 2024	Matchday 1	10	3	4	3	10	13	−3	30.00
Coppa Italia	12 August 2023		Round of 64	1	1	0	0	2	1	+1	100.00
Total				11	4	4	3	12	14	−2	36.36

Last updated: 21 October 2023
Source: Competitions

=== Serie B ===
==== League table ====
Pos	Team	Pld	W	D	L	GF	GA	GD	Pts	Promotion, qualification or relegation
12	Südtirol	38	12	11	15	46	48	−2	47 (Note: Head-to-head points: Cosenza 11, Modena 11, Reggiana 7, Südtirol 3. Head-to-head goal difference: Cosenza +6, Modena +2.)	
13	Pisa	38	11	13	14	51	54	−3	46 (Note: Pisa finished ahead of Cittadella on head-to-head points: Pisa 2–1 Cittadella, Cittadella 0–1 Pisa.)	
14	Cittadella	38	11	13	14	40	47	−7	46	
15	Spezia	38	9	17	12	36	49	−13	44	
16	Ternana (R)	38	11	10	17	43	50	−7	43	Qualification for relegation play-out

Source: Soccerway (in English)
Rules for classification: 1) Points; 2) Head-to-head points; 3) Head-to-head goal difference; 4) Goal difference; 5) Goals scored; 6) Draw.
(Note: Head-to-head record is used only after all the matches between the teams in question have been played)
(R) Relegated

==== Results summary ====
Overall								Home						Away					
Pld	W	D	L	GF	GA	GD	Pts	W	D	L	GF	GA	GD	W	D	L	GF	GA	GD
19	9	6	4	25	20	+5	33	6	2	2	17	12	+5	3	4	2	8	8	0

Last updated: 26 December 2023.
Source: Worldfootball

==== Results by round ====
Round	1	2	3	4	5	6	7	8	9	10	11	12	13	14	15	16	17	18	19	20	21	22
Ground	H	A	A	H	A	H	A	H	H	A	H	H	A	H	A	H	A	H	A	H	A	H
Result	W	L	D	D	W	L	D	W	D	L	L	W	W	W	W	W	D	W	D			
Position	5	11	11	10	7	11	10	7	9	11	13	11	9	8	7	6	6	4	4			

Updated to match(es) played on 26 December 2023. Source: Worldfootball
A = Away; H = Home; W = Win; D = Draw; L = Loss

==== Matches ====
The league fixtures were unveiled on 11 July 2023.

20 August 2023 1	Cittadella	1–0	Reggiana	Cittadella
20:30 CEST (UTC+2)	Francesco Amatucci (yellow card) 5' (goal) 45+4'; Carissoni (yellow card) 28'; Branca (yellow card) 35'	Report	Natan Girma (yellow card) 7'; Cigarini (yellow card) 45'; Bianco (yellow card) 74'	Stadium: Stadio Pier Cesare Tombolato; Attendance: 4,296; Referee: (Italy) Daniele Rutella

26 August 2023 2	Parma	2–0	Cittadella	Parma
20:30 CEST (UTC+2)	Benedyczak 2' (pen.); Adrián Bernabé 47'; Hernani (yellow card) 56'	Report	Mastrantonio (yellow card) 11'; Frare (yellow card) 35'	Stadium: Stadio Ennio Tardini; Attendance: 10,046; Referee: (Italy) Davide Ghersini

30 August 2023 3	Bari	1–1	Cittadella	Bari
20:30 CEST (UTC+2)	Nasti 6'; Di Cesare (yellow card) 83'	Report	Maistrello (yellow card) 50'; Pavan 89'	Stadium: Stadio San Nicola; Attendance: 22,440; Referee: (Italy) Alberto Santoro

3 September 2023 4	Cittadella	0–0	Venezia	Cittadella
20:45 CEST (UTC+2)	Pittarello (yellow card) 46'; Branca (yellow card) 71'; Frare (yellow card) 74'	Report	Candela (yellow card) 60'; Šverko (yellow card) 89'	Stadium: Stadio Pier Cesare Tombolato; Attendance: 5,283; Referee: (Italy) Marco Monaldi

18 September 2023 5	Sampdoria	1–2	Cittadella	Genoa
20:30 CEST (UTC+2)	Ricci (yellow card) 17'; La Gumina 43' (yellow card) 69'; Murru (yellow card) 90+4'	Report	Giraudo (yellow card) 26'; Vita (yellow card) 39'; Magrassi 49'; Branca 66'; Carissoni (yellow card) 77'	Stadium: Stadio Luigi Ferraris; Attendance: 20,357; Referee: (Italy) Matteo Gualtieri

24 September 2023 6	Cittadella	0–3	Como	Cittadella
16:15 CEST (UTC+2)	Giraudo (yellow card) 53'	Report	Ioannou 2'; Cutrone 32' 50'; Odenthal (yellow card) 71'; Barba (yellow card) 77'	Stadium: Stadio Pier Cesare Tombolato; Attendance: 3,636; Referee: (Italy) Marco Di Bello

27 September 2023 7	Catanzaro	1–1	Cittadella	Catanzaro
20:30 CEST (UTC+2)	Donnarumma 26' (pen.)	Report	Carissoni 3'; Salvi (yellow card) 45+3'; Branca (yellow card) 88'; Pittarello (yellow card) 90+5'	Stadium: Stadio Nicola Ceravolo; Attendance: 9,407; Referee: (Italy) Davide Ghersini

1 October 2023 8	Cittadella	2–1	Lecco	Cittadella
16:15 CEST (UTC+2)	Carissoni (yellow card) 26'; Angeli (yellow card) 45+4'; Salvi (yellow card) 59'; Maistrello (yellow card) 65'; Pittarello 87'; Cassano 89'	Report	Novakovich (yellow card) 2'; Alessandro Caporale (yellow card) 14'; Ioniță 20'; Degli Innocenti (yellow card) 34'; Nicolò Buso (yellow card) 62'	Stadium: Stadio Pier Cesare Tombolato; Attendance: 3,014; Referee: (Italy) Manuel Volpi

7 October 2023 9	Cittadella	2–2	Ternana	Cittadella
16:15 CEST (UTC+2)	Maistrello 10'; Cassano 29'; Vita (yellow card) 58'; Branca (yellow card) 60'	Report	Falletti 8' (pen.); Łabojko (yellow card) 62'; Sørensen 84'	Stadium: Stadio Pier Cesare Tombolato; Attendance: 2,831; Referee: (Italy) Niccoló Baroni

21 October 2023 10	Pisa	2–1	Cittadella	Pisa
14:00 CEST (UTC+2)	Piccinini 16'; Marin (yellow card) 31'; Miguel Veloso (yellow card) 68'; Tomás Esteves 70'; Leverbe (yellow card) 90+2'	Report	Giraudo (yellow card) 19'; Pittarello (yellow card) 28'; Angeli (yellow card) 46'; Magrassi (yellow card) 90+4'	Stadium: Arena Garibaldi – Stadio Romeo Anconetani; Attendance: 6,252; Referee: (Italy) Juan Luca Sacchi

27 October 2023 11	Cittadella	1–2	Cremonese	Cittadella
20:30 CEST (UTC+2)	Magrassi (yellow card) 32'; Carissoni (yellow card) 38'; Giraudo (yellow card) 43'; Angeli (yellow card) 79'; Vita 82'	Report	Antov (yellow card) 25'; Ravanelli 79'; Vázquez 90+3'	Stadium: Stadio Pier Cesare Tombolato; Attendance: 3,354; Referee: (Italy) Giacomo Camplone

4 November 2023 12	Cittadella	3–2	Brescia	Cittadella
14:00 CET (UTC+2)	Carriero 13'; Vita 32'; Danzi (yellow card) 37'; Pavan (yellow card) 51'; Maistrello 81'	Report	Frare 4' (o.g.); Dickmann (yellow card) 9'; Bertagnoli 69'; van de Looi (yellow card) 79'; Papetti (yellow card) 82'; Farès (yellow card) 88'	Stadium: Stadio Pier Cesare Tombolato; Attendance: 3.317; Referee: (Italy) Daniele Perenzoni

12 November 2023 13	Palermo	0–1	Cittadella	Palermo
16:15 CET (UTC+2)	Segre (yellow card) 90+5'	Report	Francesco Amatucci (yellow card) 8'; Salvi (yellow card) 56'; Branca (yellow card) 90+5'; Pandolfi 90+7' (yellow card) 90+9'	Stadium: Stadio Renzo Barbera; Attendance: 18,402; Referee: (Italy) Michael Fabbri

25 November 2023 14	Cittadella	2–1	Südtirol	Cittadella
14:00 CET (UTC+2)	Pandolfi 24' (yellow card) 55'; Carissoni (yellow card) 33'; Pittarello 66'; Baldini (yellow card) 76'	Report	Peeters (yellow card) 31'; Casiraghi (yellow card) 36' (goal) 56'; Poluzzi (yellow card) 76'; Masiello (yellow card) 89'	Stadium: Stadio Pier Cesare Tombolato; Attendance: 3,043; Referee: (Italy) Francesco Forneau

2 December 2023 15	Feralpisalò	0–1	Cittadella	Piacenza
14:00 CET (UTC+2)	Fiordilino (yellow card) 6'; Bergonzi (yellow card) 75'	Report	Salvi (yellow card) 16'; Pandolfi 33'; Branca (yellow card) 76'	Stadium: Stadio Leonardo Garilli; Attendance: 856; Referee: (Italy) Ermanno Feliciani

9 December 2023 16	Cittadella	2–0	Cosenza	Cittadella
14:00 CET (UTC+2)	Vita 12'; Salvi 27'; Branca (yellow card) 66'; Tessiore (yellow card) 87'; Negro (yellow card) 90+2'	Report	D'Orazio (yellow card) 16'; Praszelik (yellow card) 22'; Federico Zuccon (yellow card) 43'; Baldovino Cimino (yellow card) 81'; Valerio Crespi (yellow card) 90+5'	Stadium: Stadio Pier Cesare Tombolato; Attendance: 3,156; Referee: (Italy) Kevin Bonacina

16 December 2023 17	Modena	1–1	Cittadella	Modena
14:00 CET (UTC+2)	Duca 3'; Falcinelli (yellow card) 46'; Zaro (yellow card) 90+4'	Report	Cassano (yellow card) 17' (goal) 29'; Salvi (yellow card) 18'; Mastrantonio (yellow card) 36'; Branca (yellow card) 79'	Stadium: Stadio Alberto Braglia; Attendance: 7,907; Referee: (Italy) Davide Di Marco

23 December 2023 18	Cittadella	4–1	Spezia	Cittadella
14:00 CET (UTC+2)	Carissoni (yellow card) 10'; Carriero 15'; Giraudo (yellow card) 42'; Pittarello 75' 81'; Maistrello 86'	Report	Elia (yellow card) 51'; Nikolaou (yellow card) 59'; Moro 61'; Hristov (yellow card) 75'; Niccolò Pietra (yellow card) 79'	Stadium: Stadio Pier Cesare Tombolato; Attendance: 3,529; Referee: (Italy) Davide Ghersini

26 December 2023 19	Ascoli	0–0	Cittadella	Ascoli Piceno
15:00 CET (UTC+2)	Falasco (yellow card) 25'; Pedro Mendes (yellow card) 33'; Bellusci (yellow card) 57'	Report	Negro (yellow card) 19'; Branca (yellow card) 69'; Pavan (yellow card) 72'; Salvi (yellow card) 77'	Stadium: Stadio Cino e Lillo Del Duca; Attendance: 7,390; Referee: (Italy) Daniele Minelli

13 January 2024 20	Cittadella	2–0	Palermo	Cittadella
14:00 CET (UTC+2)				Stadium: Stadio Pier Cesare Tombolato

20 January 2024 21	Ternana	3–1	Cittadella	Terni
14:00 CET (UTC+2)				Stadium: Stadio Libero Liberati

28 January 2024 22	Cittadella	1–2	Sampdoria	Cittadella
16:15 CET (UTC+2)				Stadium: Stadio Pier Cesare Tombolato

24 February 2024	Cittadella	1–2	Catanzaro	Cittadella
14:00 CET (UTC+2)				Stadium: Stadio Pier Cesare Tombolato

10 May 2024 38	Cremonese	v	Cittadella	Cremona
20:30 CEST (UTC+2)				Stadium: Stadio Giovanni Zini

=== Coppa Italia ===
12 August 2023 Round of 64	Empoli	1–2	Cittadella	Empoli
17:45 CEST (UTC+2)	Caputo 8'; Grassi (yellow card) 57'; Pezzella (yellow card) 69'; Gyasi (yellow card) 77'	Report	Carriero (yellow card) 34'; Giraudo (yellow card) 45'; Amatucci 61'; Magrassi 80'; Cassano (penalty missed) 90+1'; Kornvig (yellow card) 90+9'	Stadium: Stadio Carlo Castellani; Attendance: 1,785; Referee: Alessandro Prontera

31 October 2023 Round of 32	Cremonese	2–1 (a.e.t.)	Cittadella	Cremona
15:00 CEST (UTC+2)	Tsadjout (yellow card) 3'; Bertolacci 48' (yellow card) 65'; Valzania (yellow card) 116'; Coda 120+1'	Report	Frare (yellow card) 27' (yellow-red card) 53'; Mastrantonio (yellow card) 80'; Vita 83'; Carissoni (yellow card) 120+3'	Stadium: Stadio Giovanni Zini; Attendance: 1,669; Referee: (Italy) Paride Tremolada
