= 2022–23 AS Cittadella season =

A.S. Cittadella
2022–23 season
- Chairman: Andrea Gabrielli
- Manager: Edoardo Gorini
- Stadium: Stadio Pier Cesare Tombolato
- Serie B: 15th
- Coppa Italia: Round of 32

The 2022–23 season was the 50th in the history of A.S. Cittadella and their seventh consecutive season in the second division. The club participated in Serie B and Coppa Italia. The season covered the period from 1 July 2022 to 30 June 2023.

== Players ==
As of 23 July 2022

Note: Flags indicate national team as defined under FIFA eligibility rules; some limited exceptions apply. Players may hold more than one non-FIFA nationality.

No.	Pos.	Nation	Player
1	GK	ITA	Filippo Manfrin
2	DF	ITA	Romano Perticone
3	DF	ITA	Gian Filippo Felicioli
5	DF	ITA	Dario Del Fabro
6	DF	ARG	Santiago Visentin
7	FW	GBS	Carlos Embaló
8	MF	ITA	Davide Mazzocco
9	FW	SEN	Mamadou Tounkara
10	MF	ITA	Mirko Antonucci
11	FW	ITA	Giacomo Beretta
15	DF	ITA	Domenico Frare
16	MF	ITA	Alessio Vita
17	DF	ITA	Daniele Donnarumma
18	DF	ITA	Alessandro Mattioli

No.	Pos.	Nation	Player
19	DF	ITA	Vincenzo Ciriello
20	MF	ITA	Giuseppe Carriero
23	MF	ITA	Simone Branca
26	MF	ITA	Nicola Pavan
29	MF	ITA	Valerio Mastrantonio
30	FW	URU	Ignacio Lores Varela
36	GK	ALB	Elhan Kastrati
72	MF	ITA	Andrea Danzi
77	GK	ITA	Luca Maniero
84	DF	ITA	Tommaso Cassandro
87	DF	ITA	Gianluca Bassano
90	FW	ESP	Raúl Asencio
92	MF	ITA	Enrico Baldini
99	FW	ITA	Andrea Magrassi

=== Out on loan ===
Note: Flags indicate national team as defined under FIFA eligibility rules; some limited exceptions apply. Players may hold more than one non-FIFA nationality.

No.	Pos.	Nation	Player
—	MF	ITA	Simone Icardi (at Feralpisalò)
—	FW	ITA	Luigi Cuppone (at Pescara, obligation to buy)

No.	Pos.	Nation	Player
—	FW	ITA	Camillo Tavernelli (at Novara)

== Pre-season and friendlies ==
Win Draw Loss

27 July 2022 Friendly	Cittadella (Italy)	8–0	(Italy) Bozner	Cittadella
17:00 CEST (UTC+2)				Stadium: Antistadio Tombolato

30 July 2022 Friendly	Cittadella (Italy)	2–0	(Italy) Trento	Lavarone
17:00 CEST (UTC+2)				Stadium: Campo Calcio

31 July 2022 Friendly	Cittadella (Italy)	2–1	(Italy) Luparense	Lavarone
17:00 CEST (UTC+2)				Stadium: Campo Calcio

== Competitions ==
=== Overall record ===
Competition	First match	Last match	Starting round	Final position	Record							
Competition	First match	Last match	Starting round	Final position	Pld	W	D	L	GF	GA	GD	Win %
Serie B	13 August 2022	19 May 2023	Matchday 1	15th	38	9	16	13	34	45	−11	23.68
Coppa Italia	5 August 2022	18 October 2022	Round of 64	Round of 32	2	1	0	1	2	5	−3	50.00
Total					40	10	16	14	36	50	−14	25.00

Source: Soccerway

=== Serie B ===
==== League table ====
Pos	Team	Pld	W	D	L	GF	GA	GD	Pts	Promotion, qualification or relegation
13	Como	38	10	17	11	47	48	−1	47 (Note: Head-to-head points: Pisa 5, Ascoli 5, Como 4. Head-to-head goal difference: Pisa +1, Ascoli −1.)	
14	Ternana	38	11	10	17	37	52	−15	43 (Note: Ternana finished ahead of Cittadella on head-to-head goal difference: Cittadella 0–2 Ternana, Ternana 1–2 Cittadella.)	
15	Cittadella	38	9	16	13	34	45	−11	43	
16	Brescia	38	9	13	16	36	57	−21	40	Spared from relegation
17	Cosenza (O)	38	9	13	16	30	53	−23	40	Qualification for relegation play-out

Source: Soccerway (in English)
Rules for classification: 1) Points; 2) Head-to-head points; 3) Head-to-head goal difference; 4) Goal difference; 5) Goals scored; 6) Draw.
(O) Play-off winners

==== Matches ====
The league fixtures were announced on 15 July 2022.

13 August 2022 1	Cittadella	4–3	Pisa	Cittadella
20:45 CEST (UTC+2)				Stadium: Stadio Pier Cesare Tombolato

10 April 2023 32	Cittadella	0–1	Parma	Cittadella

15 April 2023 33	Cosenza	1–1	Cittadella	Cosenza

22 April 2023 34	Cittadella	0–1	Genoa	Cittadella

1 May 2023 35	Bari	1–1	Cittadella	Bari

6 May 2023 36	Cittadella	3–1	Benevento	Cittadella

13 May 2023 37	Südtirol	1–1	Cittadella	Bolzano

19 May 2023 38	Cittadella	0–0	Como	Cittadella

=== Coppa Italia ===
5 August 2022 Round of 64	Lecce	2–3 (a.e.t.)	Cittadella	Lecce
21:00 CEST (UTC+2)	Strefezza 61'; González (yellow card) 90+2'; Colombo 105+1'	Report	Frare (yellow card) 18'; Donnarumma (yellow card) 33'; Perticone (yellow card) 63'; Asencio 73'; Tounkara 93', 100'	Stadium: Stadio Via del mare Referee: Gianpiero Miele

18 October 2022 Round of 32	Torino	4–0	Cittadella	Turin
--:-- CEST (UTC+2)				Stadium: Stadio Olimpico Grande Torino
