= 2021–22 AS Cittadella season =

Cittadella
2021–22 season
- Chairman: Andrea Gabrielli
- Manager: Edoardo Gorini
- Stadium: Stadio Pier Cesare Tombolato
- Serie B: 11th
- Coppa Italia: Second round
- Top goalscorer: League: Enrico Baldini (10); All: Enrico Baldini (10)

The 2021–22 season was A.S. Cittadella's sixth consecutive season in second division of the Italian football league, the Serie B, and the 49th as a football club.

== Players ==
=== First-team quad ===
As of 31 January 2022

Note: Flags indicate national team as defined under FIFA eligibility rules; some limited exceptions apply. Players may hold more than one non-FIFA nationality.

No.	Pos.	Nation	Player
2	DF	ITA	Romano Perticone
3	DF	ITA	Amedeo Benedetti
8	MF	ITA	Davide Mazzocco
9	FW	SEN	Mamadou Tounkara
11	FW	ITA	Giacomo Beretta
15	DF	ITA	Domenico Frare
16	MF	ITA	Alessio Vita
17	DF	ITA	Daniele Donnarumma
18	DF	ITA	Alessandro Mattioli
19	DF	ITA	Vincenzo Ciriello
21	FW	ITA	Camillo Tavernelli
22	FW	NGR	Orji Okwonkwo (on loan from Bologna)
23	MF	ITA	Simone Branca

No.	Pos.	Nation	Player
24	MF	ITA	Simone Icardi
25	DF	ALB	Nikolas Smajlaj
26	MF	ITA	Nicola Pavan
29	MF	ITA	Valerio Mastrantonio
33	FW	URU	Ignacio Lores Varela
36	GK	ALB	Elhan Kastrati
48	MF	ITA	Mirko Antonucci
72	MF	ITA	Andrea Danzi
77	GK	ITA	Luca Maniero
84	DF	ITA	Tommaso Cassandro
92	MF	ITA	Enrico Baldini
—	DF	ITA	Dario Del Fabro
—	FW	TUN	Karim Laribi (on loan from Reggina)

=== Out on loan ===
Note: Flags indicate national team as defined under FIFA eligibility rules; some limited exceptions apply. Players may hold more than one non-FIFA nationality.

No.	Pos.	Nation	Player
—	GK	ITA	Gabriele Plechero (at Luparense)
—	DF	ITA	Gianluca Bassano (at Montevarchi Aquila)

No.	Pos.	Nation	Player
—	MF	ITA	Christian D'Urso (at Perugia, obligation to buy)

== Pre-season and friendlies ==
Win Draw Loss

31 July 2021 Friendly	Cittadella (Italy)	0–0	(Italy) Trento	Lavarone, Italy
17:00 CEST (UTC+2)				Stadium: Campo Calcio

4 August 2021 Friendly	Cittadella (Italy)	2–0	(Italy) Virtus Verona	Lavarone, Italy
16:30 CEST (UTC+2)				Stadium: Campo Calcio

== Competitions ==
=== Overall record ===
Competition	First match	Last match	Starting round	Final position	Record							
Competition	First match	Last match	Starting round	Final position	Pld	W	D	L	GF	GA	GD	Win %
Serie B	21 August 2021	6 May 2022	Matchday 1	11th	38	13	13	12	38	36	+2	34.21
Coppa Italia	14 August 2021	15 December 2021	First round	Second round	2	1	0	1	3	4	−1	50.00
Total					40	14	13	13	41	40	+1	35.00

Source: Soccerway

=== Serie A ===
==== League table ====
Pos	Team	Pld	W	D	L	GF	GA	GD	Pts
9	Frosinone	38	15	13	10	58	45	+13	58 (Note: Perugia finished ahead of Frosinone on head-to-head points: Frosinone 0–0 Perugia, Perugia 3–0 Frosinone.)
10	Ternana	38	15	9	14	58	61	−3	54
11	Cittadella	38	13	13	12	38	36	+2	52
12	Parma	38	11	16	11	48	43	+5	49
13	Como	38	11	14	13	49	54	−5	47

Source: Lega Serie B (in Italian), Soccerway (in English)
Rules for classification: 1) Points; 2) Head-to-head points; 3) Head-to-head goal difference; 4) Goal difference; 5) Goals scored; 6) Draw.

==== Results summary ====
Overall								Home						Away					
Pld	W	D	L	GF	GA	GD	Pts	W	D	L	GF	GA	GD	W	D	L	GF	GA	GD
38	13	13	12	38	36	+2	52	7	5	7	22	18	+4	6	8	5	16	18	−2

Source: Serie B

==== Results by round ====
Round	1	2	3	4	5	6	7	8	9	10	11	12	13	14	15	16	17	18	19	20	21	22	23	24	25	26	27	28	29	30	31	32	33	34	35	36	37	38
Ground																																						
Result	W	W	L	W	L	L	W	D	L	L	W	W	D	D	D	W	W	D	D	D	D	L	W	L	W	W	D	L	D	D	L	L	D	W	L	D	W	L
Position	5	2	6	4	8	12	7	9	12	16	12	9	10	11	10	10	7	7	8	9	8	10	10	10	10	10	8	10	10	10	10	10	11	10	11	11	11	11

Source: Serie B
A = Away; H = Home; W = Win; D = Draw; L = Loss

==== Matches ====
The league fixtures were announced on 24 July 2021.

=== Coppa Italia ===
15 December 2021 Second round	Cagliari	3–1	Cittadella	Cagliari
18:00 CET (UTC+1)	Deiola 16'; Oliva (yellow card) 26'; Ceter 40'; Pereiro 64'	Report	Danzi (yellow card) 27'; Frare (yellow card) 71'; Donnarumma 85'	Stadium: Sardegna Arena; Attendance: 2,797; Referee: Maria Ferrieri
