= 2020–21 AS Cittadella season =

A.S. Cittadella
2020–21 season
- Chairman: Andrea Gabrielli
- Manager: Roberto Venturato
- Stadium: Stadio Pier Cesare Tombolato
- Serie B: 6th
- Coppa Italia: Third round
Home colours	Away colours	Third colours

The 2020–21 season was the 48th season in the existence of A.S. Cittadella and the club's second consecutive season in the second division of Italian football. In addition to the domestic league, Cittadella participated in this season's edition of the Coppa Italia.

== Players ==
=== First-team squad ===
As of 1 February 2021

Note: Flags indicate national team as defined under FIFA eligibility rules; some limited exceptions apply. Players may hold more than one non-FIFA nationality.

No.	Pos.	Nation	Player
2	DF	ITA	Romano Perticone
3	DF	ITA	Amedeo Benedetti
4	MF	ITA	Manuel Iori (Captain)
5	DF	ITA	Davide Adorni (Vice-captain)
6	DF	ITA	Agostino Camigliano
7	MF	ITA	Marco Rosafio
8	MF	ITA	Federico Proia
9	FW	ITA	Frank Tsadjout (on loan from Milan)
10	MF	ITA	Christian D'Urso
11	FW	ITA	Giacomo Beretta
15	DF	ITA	Domenico Frare
16	MF	ITA	Alessio Vita

No.	Pos.	Nation	Player
17	DF	ITA	Daniele Donnarumma
20	MF	ITA	Mario Gargiulo
21	FW	ITA	Camillo Tavernelli
23	MF	ITA	Simone Branca
24	DF	ITA	Luca Ghiringhelli
26	MF	ITA	Nicola Pavan
29	MF	ITA	Valerio Mastrantonio
32	FW	ITA	Roberto Ogunseye
36	GK	ALB	Elhan Kastrati
77	GK	ITA	Luca Maniero
84	DF	ITA	Tommaso Cassandro
92	MF	ITA	Enrico Baldini

==== Out on loan ====
Note: Flags indicate national team as defined under FIFA eligibility rules; some limited exceptions apply. Players may hold more than one non-FIFA nationality.

No.	Pos.	Nation	Player
—	GK	ITA	Alberto Paleari (at Genoa, obligation to buy)
—	GK	ITA	Gabriele Plechero (at Union San Giorgio-Sedico)
—	DF	ITA	Gianluca Bassano (at Bisceglie)

No.	Pos.	Nation	Player
—	FW	ITA	Michael De Marchi (at Virtus Verona)
—	FW	ITA	Paolo Grillo (at Catanzaro)

==== Other players under contract ====
Note: Flags indicate national team as defined under FIFA eligibility rules; some limited exceptions apply. Players may hold more than one non-FIFA nationality.

No.	Pos.	Nation	Player
—	MF	ITA	Luca Maniero (1998)

== Pre-season and friendlies ==
Win Draw Loss

== Competitions ==
=== Overall record ===
Competition	First match	Last match	Starting round	Final position	Record							
Competition	First match	Last match	Starting round	Final position	Pld	W	D	L	GF	GA	GD	Win %
Serie B	27 September 2020	10 May 2021	Matchday 1	6th	38	15	12	11	48	35	+13	39.47
Serie B promotion play-offs	13 May 2021	27 May 2021	Preliminary round	Finals	5	2	1	2	5	4	+1	40.00
Coppa Italia	30 September 2020	28 October 2020	Second round	Third round	2	1	0	1	3	3	+0	50.00
Total					45	18	13	14	56	42	+14	40.00

Source: Soccerway

=== Serie B ===
==== League table ====
Pos	Team	Pld	W	D	L	GF	GA	GD	Pts	Promotion, qualification or relegation
4	Lecce	38	16	14	8	68	47	+21	62	Qualification for promotion play-offs semi-finals
5	Venezia (O, P)	38	15	14	9	53	39	+14	59	Qualification for promotion play-offs preliminary round
6	Cittadella	38	15	12	11	48	35	+13	57	Qualification for promotion play-offs preliminary round
7	Brescia	38	15	11	12	61	53	+8	56 (Note: Head-to-head points: Brescia 9, Chievo 5, SPAL 2.)	Qualification for promotion play-offs preliminary round
8	Chievo (D, R)	38	14	14	10	50	37	+13	56	Bankruptcy

Source: Lega Serie B (in Italian), Soccerway (in English)
Rules for classification: 1) Points; 2) Head-to-head points; 3) Head-to-head goal difference; 4) Goal difference; 5) Goals scored; 6) Draw.
(D) Disqualified; (O) Play-off winners; (P) Promoted; (R) Relegated

==== Results summary ====
Overall								Home						Away					
Pld	W	D	L	GF	GA	GD	Pts	W	D	L	GF	GA	GD	W	D	L	GF	GA	GD
38	15	12	11	48	35	+13	57	9	7	3	25	14	+11	6	5	8	23	21	+2

Source: Serie B

==== Results by round ====
Round	1	2	3	4	5	6	7	8	9	10	11	12	13	14	15	16	17	18	19	20	21	22	23	24	25	26	27	28	29	30	31	32	33	34	35	36	37	38
Ground	A	H	A	H	A	H	A	H	A	A	H	H	A	H	A	H	A	H	A	H	A	H	A	H	A	H	A	H	H	A	A	H	A	H	A	H	A	H
Result	W	W	D	W	W	L	L	D	W	L	W	W	W	W	L	D	L	W	L	D	D	D	W	L	D	L	D	W	D	L	L	D	D	W	W	W	L	D
Position	1	1	1	1	3	5	8	8	7	7	7	7	4	3	3	4	3	2	4	5	5	5	4	6	5	7	7	6	6	6	8	7	8	8	6	6	6	6

Source: Serie B
A = Away; H = Home; W = Win; D = Draw; L = Loss

==== Matches ====
The league fixtures were announced on 9 September 2020.

27 September 2020 1	Cremonese	0–2	Cittadella	Cremona
CET (UTC+1)				Stadium: Stadio Giovanni Zini

4 October 2020 2	Cittadella	3–0	Brescia	Cittadella
CET (UTC+1)				Stadium: Pier Cesare Tombolato

17 October 2020 3	Cosenza	1–1	Cittadella	Cosenza
CET (UTC+1)				Stadium: Stadio San Vito-Gigi Marulla

20 October 2020 4	Cittadella	2–0	Pordenone	Cittadella
CET (UTC+1)				Stadium: Pier Cesare Tombolato

31 October 2020 6	Cittadella	1–2	Monza	Cittadella
CET (UTC+1)				Stadium: Pier Cesare Tombolato

8 November 2020 7	Pescara	3–1	Cittadella	Pescara
CET (UTC+1)				Stadium: Stadio Adriatico – Giovanni Cornacchia

21 November 2020 8	Cittadella	2–2	Empoli	Cittadella
CET (UTC+1)				Stadium: Pier Cesare Tombolato

28 November 2020 9	Pisa	1–4	Cittadella	Pisa
CET (UTC+1)				Stadium: Arena Garibaldi – Romeo Anconetani

5 December 2020 10	Salernitana	1–0	Cittadella	Salerno
CET (UTC+1)				Stadium: Stadio Arechi

12 December 2020 11	Cittadella	2–0	SPAL	Cittadella
CET (UTC+1)				Stadium: Pier Cesare Tombolato

15 December 2020 12	Cittadella	3–0	Vicenza	Cittadella
CET (UTC+1)				Stadium: Pier Cesare Tombolato

19 December 2020 13	Reggina	1–3	Cittadella	Reggio Calabria
CET (UTC+1)				Stadium: Stadio Oreste Granillo

22 December 2020 14	Cittadella	1–0	Frosinone	Cittadella
CET (UTC+1)				Stadium: Pier Cesare Tombolato

30 December 2020 16	Cittadella	2–2	Lecce	Cittadella
CET (UTC+1)				Stadium: Pier Cesare Tombolato

4 January 2021 17	Virtus Entella	1–0	Cittadella	Chiavari
CET (UTC+1)				Stadium: Comunale Aldo Gastaldi

9 January 2021 5	Reggiana	0–2	Cittadella	Reggio Emilia
CET (UTC+1)				Stadium: Mapei Stadium – Città del Tricolore

16 January 2021 18	Cittadella	1–0	Ascoli	Cittadella
CET (UTC+1)				Stadium: Pier Cesare Tombolato

23 January 2021 19	Venezia	1–0	Cittadella	Venice
CET (UTC+1)				Stadium: Stadio Pier Luigi Penzo

27 January 2021 15	Chievo	2–1	Cittadella	Verona
CET (UTC+1)				Stadium: Stadio Marc'Antonio Bentegodi

31 January 2021 20	Cittadella	1–1	Cremonese	Cittadella
CET (UTC+1)				Stadium: Pier Cesare Tombolato

6 February 2021 21	Brescia	3–3	Cittadella	Brescia
CET (UTC+1)				Stadium: Stadio Mario Rigamonti

9 February 2021 22	Cittadella	1–1	Cosenza	Cittadella
CET (UTC+1)				Stadium: Pier Cesare Tombolato

13 February 2021 23	Pordenone	0–1	Cittadella	Pordenone
CET (UTC+1)				Stadium: Stadio Guido Teghil

20 February 2021 24	Cittadella	0–3	Reggiana	Cittadella
CET (UTC+1)				Stadium: Pier Cesare Tombolato

27 February 2021 25	Monza	0–0	Cittadella	Monza
CET (UTC+1)				Stadium: Stadio Brianteo

2 March 2021 26	Cittadella	0–1	Pescara	Cittadella
CET (UTC+1)				Stadium: Pier Cesare Tombolato

7 March 2021 27	Empoli	1–1	Cittadella	Empoli
CET (UTC+1)				Stadium: Stadio Carlo Castellani

12 March 2021 28	Cittadella	2–0	Pisa	Cittadella
CET (UTC+1)				Stadium: Pier Cesare Tombolato

16 March 2021 29	Cittadella	0–0	Salernitana	Cittadella
CET (UTC+1)				Stadium: Pier Cesare Tombolato

20 March 2021 30	SPAL	1–0	Cittadella	Ferrara
CET (UTC+1)				Stadium: Stadio Paolo Mazza

2 April 2021 31	Vicenza	1–0	Cittadella	Vicenza
CEST (UTC+2)				Stadium: Stadio Romeo Menti

5 April 2021 32	Cittadella	1–1	Reggina	Cittadella
CEST (UTC+2)				Stadium: Pier Cesare Tombolato

10 April 2021 33	Frosinone	1–1	Cittadella	Frosinone
CEST (UTC+2)				Stadium: Stadio Benito Stirpe

17 April 2021 34	Cittadella	1–0	Chievo	Cittadella
CEST (UTC+2)				Stadium: Pier Cesare Tombolato

1 May 2021 35	Lecce	1–3	Cittadella	Lecce
CEST (UTC+2)				Stadium: Stadio Via del Mare

4 May 2021 36	Cittadella	1–0	Virtus Entella	Cittadella
CEST (UTC+2)				Stadium: Pier Cesare Tombolato

7 May 2021 37	Ascoli	2–0	Cittadella	Ascoli Piceno
CEST (UTC+2)				Stadium: Stadio Cino e Lillo Del Duca

10 May 2021 38	Cittadella	1–1	Venezia	Cittadella
CEST (UTC+2)				Stadium: Pier Cesare Tombolato

==== Promotion play-offs ====
13 May 2021 Preliminary round	Cittadella	1–0	Brescia	Cittadella
18:00 CEST (UTC+2)	Proia 40'	Report		Stadium: Pier Cesare Tombolato; Attendance: 0 Referee: Ivan Pezzuto

17 May 2021 Semi-finals; First leg	Cittadella	3–0	Monza	Cittadella
18:30 CEST (UTC+2)	Baldini 13', 22', 85'	Report		Stadium: Pier Cesare Tombolato; Attendance: 0 Referee: Giovanni Ayroldi

20 May 2021 Semi-finals; Second leg	Monza	2–0 (2–3 agg.)	Cittadella	Monza
20:45 CEST (UTC+2)	Balotelli 58'; D'Alessandro 78'	Report		Stadium: Brianteo; Attendance: 0 Referee: Juan Luca Sacchi

23 May 2021 Finals; First leg	Cittadella	0–1	Venezia	Cittadella
21:15 CEST (UTC+2)		Report	Di Mariano 50'	Stadium: Pier Cesare Tombolato; Attendance: 0 Referee: Simone Sozza

27 May 2021 Finals; Second leg	Venezia	1–1 (2–1 agg.)	Cittadella	Venice
21:15 CEST (UTC+2)	Bocalon 90+3'	Report	Proia 25'	Stadium: Pierluigi Penzo; Attendance: 0 Referee: Daniele Orsato

=== Coppa Italia ===
30 September 2020 Second round	Cittadella	3–1	Novara	Cittadella
15:00 CEST (UTC+2)	Iori 16' (pen.); Rosafio 74'; Ogunseye 79'	Report	Panico 76'	Stadium: Stadio Pier Cesare Tombolato; Referee: Eugenio Abbattista

28 October 2020 Third round	Cittadella	0–2	Spezia	Cesena
16:00 CET (UTC+1)	Adorni (yellow card) 74'	Report	Verde 49'; Benedetti 63' (o.g.); Vignali (yellow card) 69'; Ismajli (yellow card) 87'	Stadium: Stadio Dino Manuzzi; Referee: Marco Serra
