= 2024–25 AS Cittadella season =

AS Cittadella
2024–25 season
- Manager: Edoardo Gorini (until 11 October); Alessandro Dal Canto (from 14 October)
- Stadium: Stadio Pier Cesare Tombolato
- Serie B: 15th
- Coppa Italia: First round
- Top goalscorer: League: Luca Pandolfi (5); All: Luca Pandolfi (5)
- Biggest win: Cittadella 3–1 Reggiana
- Biggest defeat: Sassuolo 6–1 Cittadella; Spezia 5–0 Cittadella
- All statistics correct as of 29 December 2024.

The 2024–25 season represents AS Cittadella’s 52nd year in existence and their ninth consecutive appearance in Serie B. The club also participated in the Coppa Italia.

== Transfers ==
=== In ===
Pos.	Player	Transferred from	Fee	Date	Source
MF	(Italy) Davide Voltan	(Italy) Feralpisalò	Undisclosed	30 August 2024	
DF	(Italy) Stefano Piccinini	(Italy) Sassuolo	Undisclosed	30 August 2024	
DF	(Uganda) Elio Capradossi	Unattached	Free	25 November 2024	

=== Out ===
Pos.	Player	Transferred to	Fee	Date	Source
DF	(Italy) Edoardo Sottini	(Italy) SPAL	Undisclosed	29 August 2024	
FW	(Italy) Enrico Baldini		Contract terminated	30 August 2024	
FW	(Italy) Tommy Maistrello	(Italy) Feralpisalò	Undisclosed	30 August 2024	

== Competitions ==
=== Overall record ===
Competition	First match	Last match	Starting round	Final position	Record							
Competition	First match	Last match	Starting round	Final position	Pld	W	D	L	GF	GA	GD	Win %
Serie B	17 August 2024	9 May 2025	Matchday 1		20	6	5	9	17	32	−15	30.00
Coppa Italia	9 August 2024		First round	First round	1	0	0	1	1	2	−1	0.00
Total					21	6	5	10	18	34	−16	28.57

Last updated: 29 December 2024
Source: Competitions

=== Serie B ===
==== League table ====
Pos	Team	Pld	W	D	L	GF	GA	GD	Pts	Promotion, qualification or relegation
16	Salernitana (R)	38	11	9	18	37	47	−10	42	Qualification for relegation play-out
17	Sampdoria (O)	38	8	17	13	38	49	−11	41	Qualification for relegation play-out
18	Brescia (R, E)	38	9	16	13	41	48	−7	39 (Note: Brescia were deducted 4 points due to administrative irregularities.)	Excluded and folded
19	Cittadella (R)	38	10	9	19	30	56	−26	39	Relegation to Serie C
20	Cosenza (R)	38	7	13	18	32	56	−24	30 (Note: Cosenza were deducted 4 points due to administrative irregularities.)	Relegation to Serie C

Source: Serie BKT
Rules for classification: 1) Points; 2) Head-to-head points; 3) Head-to-head goal difference; 4) Goal difference; 5) Goals scored; 6) Draw.
(Note: Head-to-head record is used only after all the matches between the teams in question have been played)
(E) Eliminated; (O) Play-off winners; (R) Relegated

==== Results summary ====
Overall								Home						Away					
Pld	W	D	L	GF	GA	GD	Pts	W	D	L	GF	GA	GD	W	D	L	GF	GA	GD
20	6	5	9	16	32	−16	23	2	5	3	8	11	−3	4	0	6	8	21	−13

Last updated: 29 December 2024.

==== Results by round ====
Round	1	2	3	4	5	6	7	8	9	10	11	12	13	14	15	16	17	18	19	20
Ground	A	A	H	A	H	A	H	A	H	A	H	A	H	A	H	A	H	H	A	H
Result	L	W	L	W	D	L	L	L	D	L	D	W	L	L	D	L	D	W	W	W
Position																				

Updated to match(es) played on 29 December 2024. Source:
A = Away; H = Home; W = Win; D = Draw; L = Loss

==== Matches ====
17 August 2024 1	Salernitana	2–1	Cittadella	Salerno

24 August 2024 2	Brescia	0–1	Cittadella	Brescia

27 August 2024 3	Cittadella	0–3	Pisa	Cittadella
				Stadium: Stadio Pier Cesare Tombolato

31 August 2024 4	Modena	0–1	Cittadella	Modena

14 September 2024 5	Cittadella	0–0	Catanzaro	Cittadella
				Stadium: Stadio Pier Cesare Tombolato

22 September 2024 6	Mantova	1–0	Cittadella	Mantua

27 September 2024 7	Cittadella	1–2	Frosinone	Cittadella
				Stadium: Stadio Pier Cesare Tombolato

5 October 2024 8	Sassuolo	6–1	Cittadella	Reggio Emilia
				Stadium: Mapei Stadium – Città del Tricolore

19 October 2024 9	Cittadella	0–0	Cosenza	Cittadella
				Stadium: Stadio Pier Cesare Tombolato

26 October 2024 10	Carrarese	3–0	Cittadella	Carrara

30 October 2024 11	Cittadella	0–0	Sampdoria	Cittadella
				Stadium: Stadio Pier Cesare Tombolato

3 November 2024 12	Palermo	0–1	Cittadella	Palermo

10 November 2024 13	Cittadella	0–2	Cesena	Cittadella
				Stadium: Stadio Pier Cesare Tombolato

24 November 2024 14	Bari	3–2	Cittadella	Bari

30 November 2024 15	Cittadella	2–2	Juve Stabia	Cittadella
				Stadium: Stadio Pier Cesare Tombolato

8 December 2024 16	Spezia	5–0	Cittadella	La Spezia

15 December 2024 17	Cittadella	0–0	Cremonese	Cittadella
				Stadium: Stadio Pier Cesare Tombolato

21 December 2024 18	Cittadella	3–1	Reggiana	Cittadella
				Stadium: Stadio Pier Cesare Tombolato

26 December 2024 19	Südtirol	1–2	Cittadella	Bolzano
15:00				Stadium: Stadio Druso

29 December 2024 20	Cittadella	2–1	Palermo	Cittadella
17:15				Stadium: Stadio Pier Cesare Tombolato

=== Coppa Italia ===
9 August 2024 First round	Sassuolo	2–1	Cittadella	Reggio Emilia
	Mulattieri 45'; Laurienté 58'		Baldini 48'	Stadium: Mapei Stadium – Città del Tricolore
