= Elhan Kastrati =

Albanian footballer (born 1997)

Personal information
- Date of birth: 2 February 1997 (age 29)
- Place of birth: Krumë, Albania
- Height: 1.89 m (6 ft 2 in)
- Position: Goalkeeper

Team information
- Current team: Athens Kallithea
- Number: 36

Youth career
- 2009–2014: Teuta
- 2014–2016: Pescara
- 2014: → Renato Curi Angolana (loan)

Senior career*
Years	Team	Apps	(Gls)
2012–2013	Teuta	0	(0)
2015–2020	Pescara	15	(0)
2016	→ Piacenza (loan)	1	(0)
2017–2018	→ Teuta (loan)	32	(0)
2020	Trapani	2	(0)
2020–2025	Cittadella	151	(0)
2025–2026	Eintracht Braunschweig	2	(0)
2026–	Athens Kallithea	9	(0)

International career^{‡}
2012–2014	Albania U17	11	(0)
2015	Albania U19	3	(0)
2017–2018	Albania U21	16	(0)
2022–	Albania	3	(0)
- * Club domestic league appearances and goals as of 15 November 2026 ‡ National team caps and goals as of 21 March 2025

Elhan Kastrati (born 2 February 1997) is an Albanian professional footballer who plays as a goalkeeper for Super League Greece 2 club Athens Kallithea and the Albania national team.

Developed through the youth system of Teuta, he began his senior career in Albania before moving to Italy, where he played for Pescara, Piacenza, Trapani and Cittadella, making more than 150 appearances in Serie B. He later played in Germany for Eintracht Braunschweig before joining Athens Kallithea in 2026.

At international level, Kastrati represented Albania at under-17, under-19 and under-21 levels before making his senior debut in 2022; he was part of the national squad at UEFA Euro 2024.

== Club career ==
=== Teuta ===
Born in Krumë, Albania, Kastrati developed an interest in football through his older brother Resul, who encouraged him to become a goalkeeper during their childhood. He joined Teuta's youth system at the age of 12 in 2009 and remained at the club until early 2014. He was part of Teuta's under-19 team that won the national championship in 2011–12. During the 2012–13 season, he joined Teuta's first team, making two appearances in the league and four in the Albanian Cup. He was listed among the club's goalkeepers for the 2013–14 season.

=== Pescara ===
After a successful trial at Verona in 2012 failed to result in a transfer due to bureaucratic issues, Kastrati returned to Teuta before joining Pescara the following year. He initially spent several months at Renato Curi Angolana before joining Pescara's Berretti side in the summer of 2015. He had made eight appearances during the 2014–15 Campionato Nazionale Primavera and was included in the first team's pre-season training camp ahead of the following campaign. During the 2015–16 season, he was an unused substitute in one Coppa Italia and two Serie B matches, while making 24 appearances for Pescara's youth team in the league. The team finished fifth in Group B with 44 points, missing out on the play-offs.

==== Loans to Piacenza and Teuta (2016–2018) ====
On 14 July 2016, Kastrati joined Piacenza of Lega Pro on a season-long loan. After limited playing time, he made his professional debut on 18 December, replacing Mirco Miori in the 53rd minute of a 1–0 defeat to Prato after the goalkeeper was sent off.

On 26 January 2017, his loan was terminated and he returned to Pescara, which loaned him to his former club Teuta. He said that limited playing time at Piacenza had prompted him to seek regular football to aid his development. He made 13 league appearances for Teuta during the remainder of the season, and his loan was extended on 29 June for the 2017–18 season. He made 19 league appearances and one in the cup before returning to Pescara at the end of the season.

==== Return to Pescara (2018–2020) ====
After returning from his loan at Teuta in 2018, Kastrati made four appearances in the 2018–19 Serie B, deputising for first-choice goalkeeper Vincenzo Fiorillo. The following season, he became Pescara's starting goalkeeper in October 2019 after Fiorillo suffered a hand fracture. On 29 October, Kastrati saved a penalty from Francesco Forte in a 2–1 defeat to Juve Stabia. He made 11 league appearances before joining Trapani on a permanent transfer in January 2020.

=== Trapani ===
On 29 January 2020, Kastrati joined Serie B side Trapani on a permanent transfer from Pescara. He made his debut on 3 March, starting in a 4–1 league win over Virtus Entella, and featured twice in the 2019–20 Serie B before leaving the club in October.

=== Cittadella ===
On 13 October 2020, Kastrati joined Serie B club Cittadella. He made his debut on 31 January 2021, starting in a 1–1 draw against Cremonese. He made 19 league appearances during the 2020–21 Serie B season and started all of Cittadella's promotion play-off matches, making several notable saves, including against Monza, as the club reached the final against Venezia, where they lost 2–1 on aggregate.

Kastrati established himself as Cittadella's first-choice goalkeeper in the following seasons. In 2022–23, he was voted the club's Player of the Year by its supporters after making 37 appearances and keeping 11 clean sheets. His performances were particularly influential during the second half of the season, when Cittadella secured its league status on the final matchday.

Cittadella were relegated to Serie C at the end of the 2024–25 Serie B season, and Kastrati left the club that summer. During his five-year spell, he made 151 appearances in Serie B and five in the Coppa Italia.

=== Eintracht Braunschweig ===
On 8 August 2025, Kastrati signed a two-year contract with Eintracht Braunschweig in the German 2. Bundesliga. After spending much of the season as a backup to Ron-Thorben Hoffmann, Kastrati made two league appearances in March 2026 following Hoffmann's injury. His contract was mutually terminated on 12 July 2026.

=== Athens Kallithea ===
On 20 August 2026, Kastrati joined Super League Greece 2 club Athens Kallithea on a free transfer after leaving Eintracht Braunschweig.

== International career ==
Kastrati represented Albania's youth teams at under-17 level in 2012, under-19 level during the 2016 UEFA European Under-19 Championship qualification, and under-21 level, including the 2019 UEFA European Under-21 Championship qualification.

Kastrati made his debut for the senior national team on 13 June 2022, replacing Gentian Selmani at half-time in a goalless friendly draw against Estonia. He made his first start on 26 October in a 1–1 friendly draw against Saudi Arabia, playing the first half before being substituted at half-time.

During the UEFA Euro 2024 qualifiers, Kastrati served as a reserve goalkeeper behind Etrit Berisha and Thomas Strakosha and made no appearances as Albania topped their qualifying group for the first timea with 15 points, finishing level with the Czech Republic but ahead on head-to-head record, and qualified for the UEFA European Championship for the second time. He was included in Albania's squad for the final tournament in Germany, where he remained an unused substitute in all three group-stage matches as the team finished bottom of Group B with one point and were eliminated. Kastrati made his competitive debut on 21 March 2025 in the 2026 FIFA World Cup qualifiers against England, replacing Thomas Strakosha following an injury. He played the final eight minutes of the match, which remained his only appearance in the Group of the K qualifying campaign, and was an unused substitute in Albania's 2–1 defeat to Poland in the play-off semi-finals, as the team failed to qualify for the tournament.

== Career statistics ==
=== Club ===
As of 15 November 2026

Appearances and goals by club, season and competition
Club	Season	League			Cup		Europe (Note: Includes UEFA Champions League and UEFA Europa League.)		Other		Total	
Club	Season	Division	Apps	Goals	Apps	Goals	Apps	Goals	Apps	Goals	Apps	Goals
Teuta	2012–13	Kategoria Superiore	0	0	0	0	—		—		0	0
Pescara	2015–16	Serie A	0	0	0	0	—		—		0	0
Pescara	2018–19	Serie B	4	0	0	0	—		—		4	0
Pescara	2019–20	Serie B	11	0	0	0	—		—		11	0
Pescara	Total		15	0	0	0	—		—		15	0
Piacenza (loan)	2016–17	Lega Pro	1	0	—		—		—		1	0
Teuta (loan)	2016–17	Kategoria Superiore	13	0	1	0	—		—		14	0
Teuta (loan)	2017–18	Kategoria Superiore	19	0	1	0	—		—		20	0
Teuta (loan)	Total		32	0	2	0	—		—		34	0
Trapani	2019–20	Serie B	2	0	0	0	—		—		2	0
Cittadella	2020–21	Serie B	19	0	1	0	—		5	0	25	0
Cittadella	2021–22	Serie B	32	0	1	0	—		—		33	0
Cittadella	2022–23	Serie B	36	0	1	0	—		—		37	0
Cittadella	2023–24	Serie B	35	0	1	0	—		—		36	0
Cittadella	2024–25	Serie B	29	0	1	0	—		—		30	0
Cittadella	Total		151	0	5	0	—		5	0	161	0
Eintracht Braunschweig	2025–26	2. Bundesliga	2	0	—		—		—		2	0
Athens Kallithea	2026–27	Super League Greece 2	9	0	—		—		—		9	0
Career total			212	0	7	0	—		5	0	224	0

=== International ===
As of match played 21 March 2025

Appearances and goals by national team and year
National team	Year	Apps	Goals
Albania
Albania	2022	2	0
Albania	2025	1	0
Total		3	0
