= 2026–27 AC Perugia Calcio season =

Football club season

AC Perugia Calcio
2026–27 season
- Chairman: Javier Faroni
- Head coach: Aimo Diana
- Stadium: Stadio Renato Curi
colours	colours	colours
- All statistics correct as of 26 September 2026.

The 2026–27 season is the 122nd in the history of Perugia Calcio and the club's fourth consecutive season in the third tier of Italian football, Serie C. The team is coached by Aimo Diana and competes in Group B of the championship, alongside participation in the Coppa Italia Serie C.

== Squad ==
=== Current squad ===
As of 31 August 2026

Note: Flags indicate national team as defined under FIFA eligibility rules; some limited exceptions apply. Players may hold more than one non-FIFA nationality.

No.	Pos.	Nation	Player
1	GK	POL	Radosław Żelezny (on loan from Roma)
3	DF	ITA	Moustapha Yabre
4	DF	ITA	Alessandro Tozzuolo
5	DF	ITA	Diego Stramaccioni
6	DF	ITA	Matteo Angeli
7	MF	ITA	Andrea Cisco (on loan from Union Brescia)
8	MF	ITA	Riccardo Ladinetti
9	FW	ITA	Antonio Sabbatani
10	FW	ITA	Luigi Canotto
11	DF	ERI	Matteo Borsoi
12	GK	ITA	Luca Moro
14	DF	ITA	Ettore Quirini (on loan from Salernitana)
15	DF	BUL	Dimitar Papazov (on loan from Bologna)
19	MF	ITA	Christian Dottori
20	MF	ITA	Giuseppe Carriero

No.	Pos.	Nation	Player
21	MF	ITA	Giorgio Tumbarello
23	MF	LTU	Linas Mėgelaitis (captain)
26	FW	FRA	Sayha Seha (on loan from Catanzaro)
28	DF	ITA	Davide Riccardi
29	DF	ITA	Guillaume Renault
30	FW	NED	Pelle van Amersfoort
31	MF	ITA	Gabriele Conti
33	MF	ITA	Christian Langella
39	DF	ITA	Giacomo Cavallini
55	GK	ITA	Sebastian Strappini
71	DF	ITA	Pietro Rondolini
72	MF	ITA	Matteo Cortesi (on loan from Arezzo)
77	MF	ALB	Elvis Kabashi
90	FW	ITA	Edoardo Vergani
—	GK	ITA	Ruben Rinaldini

== Competitions ==
=== Overall record ===
Competition	First match	Last match	Starting round	Record							
Competition	First match	Last match	Starting round	Pld	W	D	L	GF	GA	GD	Win %
Serie C	1		Matchday 1	6	2	1	3	6	9	−3	33.33
Coppa Italia Serie C			First round	0	0	0	0	0	0	+0	—
Total				6	2	1	3	6	9	−3	33.33

Last updated: 26 September 2026
Source: Competitions

=== Serie C ===
Group B

==== Results summary ====
Overall								Home						Away					
Pld	W	D	L	GF	GA	GD	Pts	W	D	L	GF	GA	GD	W	D	L	GF	GA	GD
6	2	1	3	6	9	−3	7	2	0	1	4	4	0	0	1	2	2	5	−3

Last updated: 26 September 2026.

==== Results by round ====
Round	1	2	3	4	5	6
Ground	H	A	H	A	A	A
Result	W	D	W	L	L	L
Position						

Updated to match(es) played on 26 September 2026. Source:
A = Away; H = Home; W = Win; D = Draw; L = Loss

==== Matches ====
23 August 2026

Perugia	1–0	Ostiamare

Stadio Renato Curi, Perugia
30 August 2026

Vis Pesaro	2–2	Perugia

Stadio Tonino Benelli, Pesaro
2 September 2026

Perugia	2–1	Pineto

Stadio Renato Curi, Perugia
6 September 2026

Ravenna	3–0	Perugia

Stadio Bruno Benelli, Ravenna
13 September 2026

Spezia	3–0	Perugia

Stadio Alberto Picco, La Spezia
20 September 2026

Grosseto	2–0	Perugia

Stadio Carlo Zecchini, Grosseto
