= Ciriello =

Ciriello is an Italian surname. Notable people with the surname include:

- Chris Ciriello (born 1985), Australian field hockey player
- Monica Ciriello (born 1988–89), Canadian politician
- Vincenzo Ciriello (born 2002), Italian footballer

== See also ==
- Giulio Cirello (1633–1709), Italian painter
