= Miori (surname) =

Miori is an Italian surname. Notable people with the surname include:

- Carlos Miori (1901–1985), Argentine football player
- Eugenia Ramírez Miori (born 1974), Argentine actress, singer and dancer
- Luciano Miori (1895–1975), Italian politician
- Luciano Miori (drawer) (1921–2006), Italian drawer
- Luciano Miori (latinist) (1921–2006), Italian latinist, Greek scholar and translator.
- Mirco Miori (born 1995), Italian football player
