= Luzayadio Bangu =

DR Congolese footballer (born 1997)

Personal information
- Full name: Luzayadio Andy Bangu
- Date of birth: 10 October 1997 (age 29)
- Place of birth: Kinshasa, DR Congo
- Height: 1.72 m (5 ft 8 in)
- Position: Midfielder

Team information
- Current team: Aglianese
- Number: 8

Youth career
- Costa Masnaga
- –2011: Atalanta
- 2011–2016: Fiorentina

Senior career*
Years	Team	Apps	(Gls)
2016–2019	Fiorentina	0	(0)
2016–2017	→ Reggina (loan)	33	(5)
2017–2018	→ Vicenza (loan)	15	(0)
2018–2019	→ Matera (loan)	16	(0)
2019	→ Bisceglie (loan)	14	(0)
2019–2021	Gubbio	12	(0)
2021–	Aglianese	3	(0)

International career^{‡}
2015	DR Congo U20	1	(0)
- * Club domestic league appearances and goals as of 28 February 2021 ‡ National team caps and goals as of 5 March 2018

Luzayadio Andy Bangu (born 10 October 1997) is a DR-Congolese footballer who plays as a midfielder for Italian Serie D club Aglianese.

== Club career ==
=== Fiorentina ===
==== 2016–17 season: Loan to Reggina ====
On 19 August, Bangu was signed by Serie C side Reggina on a season-long loan deal. On 26 August, Bangu made his Serie C debut for Reggina as a starter in a 3–1 away defeat against Fondi, he was replaced by Andrea Bianchimano in the 86th minute. On 14 September, Bangu scored his first professional goal, as a substitute, in the 78th minute of a 1–1 home draw against Catania. On 18 September he played his first entire match for Reggina, a 1–1 away draw against Monopoli. On 9 October he scored his second goal and the winning goal of the match in the 59th minute of a 1–0 home win over Juve Stabia. On 29 December he was sent off with a red card in the 84th minute of a 2–0 away defeat against Messina. On 25 February, Bangu scored his third goal in the 41st minute of a 3–3 away draw against Juve Stabia. On 5 March he scored his fourth goal 20th minute of a 3–0 home win over Casertana. On 23 April he scored his fifth goal, as a substitute, in the 82nd minute of a 3–2 home win over Virtus Francavilla. Bangu ended his season-long loan to Reggiana with 33 appearances, 5 goals and 1 assist.

==== 2017–18 season: Loan to Vicenza ====
On 22 July, Bangu was loaned to Serie C side Vicenza on a season-long loan deal. On 30 July, Bangu made his debut for Vicenza as a starter in a 4–1 home win over Pro Piacenza in the first round of Coppa Italia, he was replaced by Federico Giraudo in the 72nd minute. On 6 August he played in the second round in a 3–1 home defeat against Foggia, he was replaced by Marco Romizi in the 77th minute. On 27 August, Bangu made his Serie C debut for Vicenza in a 3–0 home win over Gubbio, he was replaced by Eric Lanini in the 81st minute.

==== 2018–19 season: Loans to Matera and Bisceglie ====
On 31 January 2019, he joined Serie C club Bisceglie on loan until the end of the season.

=== Gubbio ===
On 20 August 2019, he signed a three-year contract with Serie C club Gubbio. His Gubbio contract was terminated by mutual consent on 15 February 2021.

== International career ==
Bangu debuted for the DR Congo U20 in an 8-0 friendly loss to the England U17s on 7 October 2015.
