= Andrea Tessiore =

Italian footballer (born 1999)

Personal information
- Date of birth: 1 October 1999 (age 27)
- Place of birth: Pietra Ligure, Italy
- Height: 1.73 m (5 ft 8 in)
- Position: Midfielder

Team information
- Current team: Folgore Caratese (on loan from Guidonia)
- Number: 92

Youth career
- –2018: Sampdoria

Senior career*
Years	Team	Apps	(Gls)
2018–2021	Sampdoria	0	(0)
2018–2021	→ Vis Pesaro (loan)	63	(1)
2021–2023	Latina	51	(2)
2023	Triestina	11	(0)
2023–2025	Cittadella	48	(0)
2025–	Guidonia	32	(5)
2026–	→ Folgore Caratese (loan)	5	(0)
- * Club domestic league appearances and goals as of 26 September 2026

Andrea Tessiore (born 1 October 1999) is an Italian footballer who plays as a midfielder for Serie C Group A club Folgore Caratese on loan from Guidonia.

== Career ==
=== Sampdoria ===
Born in Pietra Ligure, Tessiore was a youth exponent of Sampdoria.

==== Loan to Vis Pesaro ====
On 23 July 2018, Tessiore was signed by Serie C club Vis Pesaro on a season-long loan deal. On 18 September he made his professional debut, in Serie C, as a starter in a 2–0 away defeat against Triestina, he was replaced by Flavio Lazzari after 61 minutes. Eleven days later, on 26 September, he scored his first professional goal, as a substitute, in the 86th minute of a 1–1 away draw against Sambenedettese. On 5 May 2019, Tessiore played his first entire match for the club, a 3–3 away draw against Giana Erminio. Tessiore ended his season-long loan to Vis Pesaro with 25 appearances, 1 goal and 1 assist.

On 16 July 2019, Tessiore returned to Vis Pesaro on another season-long loan. On 25 August he made his season debut for Vis Pesaro in a 2–1 home defeat against Südtirol, he played the entire match. Tessiore ended his second season to Vis Pesaro with 17 appearances, including 12 as a starter, and 2 assist.

On 28 August 2020 the loan has been extended.

=== Latina ===
On 11 August 2021 Tessiore signed for Latina on a free transfer.

=== Triestina ===
On 31 January 2023, Tessiore moved to Triestina.

=== Cittadella ===
On 27 June 2023, it was announced that Tessiore would join Serie B club Cittadella.

== Career statistics ==
=== Club ===
As of match played 3 April 2022

Club	Season	League			Cup		Other		Total	
Club	Season	League	Apps	Goals	Apps	Goals	Apps	Goals	Apps	Goals
Vis Pesaro (loan)	2018–19	Serie C	25	1	0	0	—		25	1
Vis Pesaro (loan)	2019–20	Serie C	17	0	0	0	—		17	0
Vis Pesaro (loan)	2020–21	Serie C	21	0	0	0	—		21	0
Vis Pesaro (loan)	Total		63	1	0	0	—		63	1
Latina	2021–22	Serie C	32	1	0	0	—		32	1
Career total			95	2	0	0	—		95	2
