= Claudio Cassano =

Italian footballer (born 2003)

Personal information
- Date of birth: 22 July 2003 (age 23)
- Place of birth: Barletta, Italy
- Height: 5 ft 8 in (1.73 m)
- Position: Forward

Team information
- Current team: Lugano (on loan from Chicago Fire II)
- Number: 19

Youth career
- –2014: Brasilea Barletta
- 2017–2018: Bisceglie
- 2018–2023: Roma

Senior career*
Years	Team	Apps	(Gls)
2022–2023	Roma	0	(0)
2023–2025	Cittadella	40	(4)
2025–	Chicago Fire II	20	(10)
2025–2026	→ Lugano (loan)	9	(1)
- * Club domestic league appearances and goals as of 26 May 2026

Claudio Cassano (born 22 July 2003) is an Italian professional footballer who plays as forward for Swiss Super League club Lugano, on loan from MLS Next Pro club Chicago Fire II.

== Club career ==
=== Roma ===
Claudio Cassano was born in Barletta, Apulia, starting to play football in Barletta, then playing for Bisceglie as an under-15, before moving to the youth academy of Roma in 2018.

Proving to be a prolific goalscorer with the Primavera in 2022–23, he began to train with José Mourinho's first team, making his first bench appearance with the professionals on the 13 October 2022, during the 1–1 away Europa League draw to Spanish La Liga club Betis. He was also part of Roma's under-19 squad that won the Coppa Italia Primavera.

=== Cittadella ===
On 3 August 2023, Serie B club Cittadella announced the signing of Cassano from Roma on a permanent transfer.

=== Chicago Fire ===
On 10 February 2025, Cassano left Cittadella, and sign for Major League Soccer (MLS) club Chicago Fire, getting immediately assigned to the MLS Next Pro team Chicago Fire FC II.

==== Loan to Lugano ====
On 8 September 2025, Cassano returned to Europe, joining Swiss Super League club Lugano on a loan deal until 30 June 2026.

== Honours ==
=== Club ===
Roma U19

- Campionato Primavera runner-up: 2021–22
- Coppa Italia Primavera: 2022–23
