= Federico Giraudo =

Italian footballer

Personal information
- Date of birth: 11 August 1998 (age 28)
- Place of birth: Cuneo, Italy
- Height: 1.82 m (5 ft 11 1/2 in)
- Position: Defender

Team information
- Current team: Casarano
- Number: 3

Youth career
- –2017: Torino

Senior career*
Years	Team	Apps	(Gls)
2017–2020	Torino	0	(0)
2017–2018	→ Vicenza (loan)	28	(0)
2018–2019	→ Ternana (loan)	25	(0)
2019–2020	→ Cesena (loan)	11	(0)
2020–2022	Vis Pesaro	47	(1)
2022	→ Reggina (loan)	15	(0)
2022–2024	Reggina	12	(0)
2023–2024	→ Cittadella (loan)	35	(0)
2024–2026	Perugia	46	(1)
2026–	Casarano	13	(2)

International career^{‡}
2014–2015	Italy U-17	11	(1)
2015–2016	Italy U-18	8	(0)
2016	Italy U-19	1	(0)
- * Club domestic league appearances and goals as of 1 May 2026 ‡ National team caps and goals as of 11 August 2016

Federico Giraudo (born 10 August 1998) is an Italian professional footballer who plays as a defender for Serie C Group C club Casarano.

== Club career ==
=== Torino ===
Born in Cuneo, Giraudo was a youth exponent of Torino.

==== Loan to Vicenza ====
On 26 July 2017, Giraudo was signed by Serie C side Vicenza on a season-long loan deal. Four days later, on 30 July, he made his debut for Vicenza as a substitute replacing Luzayadio Bangu in the 72nd minute of a 4–1 home win over Pro Piacenza in the first round of Coppa Italia. Four more weeks later, on 27 August, he made his Serie C debut for Vicenza as a substitute replacing Pietro Beruatto in the 81st minute of a 3–0 home win over Gubbio. On 4 October he played his first entire match for Vicenza, a 2–1 home win over Alma Juventus Fano. He also helps the club to avoid relegation in Serie D winning the play-out matches 3–2 on aggregate against Santarcangelo. Giraudo ended his season-long loan to Vicenza with 32 appearances, including 23 of them as a starter, and 2 assists.

==== Loan to Ternana ====
On 23 July 2018, Giraudo was loaned to Serie C club Ternana on a season-long loan deal. One week later, on 29 July, he made his debut for Ternana in a match won 4–2 at penalties after a 1–1 home draw against Pontedera in the first round of Coppa Italia, he played the entire match. Three months later, on 4 November, he made his Serie C debut for Ternana as a substitute replacing Aniello Sanzano in the 68th minute of a 4–1 away win over Monza. He became Ternana's first-choice after the start of the season. One more month later, on 4 December, Giraudo played his first match as a starter, a 3–0 home win over Rimini, he was replaced by Daniele Gasparetto after 84 minutes. Giraudo ended his loan to Ternana with 25 appearances, 12 of them as a starter.

==== Loan to Cesena ====
On 3 September 2019, Giraudo was loaned back again in Serie C and he joined to newly promoted club Cesena on a season-long loan deal. Five days later, on 8 September, he made his debut for the club in a 2–0 away win over Virtus Verona, he was replaced by Andrea Ciofi in the 87th minute. Three more weeks later, on 21 September, he played his first entire match for Cesena, a 1–1 home draw against Piacenza. Giraudo ended his season-long loan to Cesena with only 11 appearances, including 7 of them as a starter, playing only 3 entire matches, however he remained an unused substitute for 12 other league matches.

=== Vis Pesaro ===
On 8 October 2020, Giraudo joined to Serie C club Vis Pesaro on a free-transfer signing a 2-year contract. Nine days later, on 17 October, he made his debut for the club as a substitute replacing Valerio Nava in the 62nd minute of a 0–0 away draw against Virtus Verona. Four more days later, on 21 October, Giraudo played his first match as a starter for Vis Pesaro, a 1–0 home defeat against Triestina, he was replaced by Valerio Nava in the 70th minute. On 1 November he scored his first professional goal in the 77th minute of a 1–0 home win over Gubbio. One week later, on 8 November, he played his first entire match for the club, a 1–0 away defeat against FeralpiSalò.

=== Reggina ===
On 14 January 2022 he went to Reggina on loan with a conditional obligation to buy.

==== Loan to Cittadella ====
On 25 January 2023, Giraudo extended his contract with Reggina until 30 June 2025 and was loaned to Cittadella until 30 June 2024, with an option to buy.

=== Perugia ===
Giraudo signed a contract with Perugia on 30 August 2024, lasting until 30 June 2026.

== International career ==
Giraudo represented Italy at Under-17, Under-18 and Under-19 levels. On 17 December 2014 he made his debut at U-17 level and he scored his first goal in the 75th minute of a 4–1 away win over Iran U-17, he played the entire match. Giraudo played all 3 matches in the elite round of the 2015 UEFA European Under-17 Championship qualification. He was a member of the team who played in the 2015 UEFA European Under-17 Championship, here, Giraudo played 5 matches and he make 1 assist. On 12 August 2015, Giraudo made his debut at U-18 level in a 0–0 home draw against Bulgaria U-19, he was replaced by Luca Coccolo in the 80th minute. On 13 April 2016 he played his first entire match for Italy U-18, a 2–1 home defeat against France U-18. On 11 August 2016, Giraudo made his debut at U-19 level as a substitute replacing Pietro Beruatto in the 54th minute of a 1–0 home defeat against Croatia U-19.

== Career statistics ==
=== Club ===
As of 18 May 2021

Club	Season	League			Cup		Europe		Other		Total	
Club	Season	League	Apps	Goals	Apps	Goals	Apps	Goals	Apps	Goals	Apps	Goals
Vicenza (loan)	2017–18	Serie C	28	0	2	0	—		2 (Note: All appearance(s) in Serie C play-out.)	0	32	0
Ternana (loan)	2018–19	Serie C	22	0	3	0	—		—		25	0
Cesena (loan)	2019–20	Serie C	11	0	0	0	—		—		11	0
Vis Pesaro	2020–21	Serie C	29	1	0	0	—		—		29	1
Career total			90	1	5	0	—		2	0	97	1

== Honours ==
=== Club ===
Torino Primavera

- Supercoppa Primavera: 2015
