= Andrea Magrassi =

Italian footballer (born 1993)

Personal information
- Date of birth: 6 February 1993 (age 33)
- Place of birth: Dolo, Italy
- Height: 1.94 m (6 ft 4 in)
- Position: Forward

Team information
- Current team: Reggina
- Number: 9

Youth career
- Marco Polo
- Venezia
- 2009–2012: Brescia

Senior career*
Years	Team	Apps	(Gls)
2011–2012	Brescia	1	(0)
2012–2015	Sampdoria	0	(0)
2012–2013	→ Portogruaro (loan)	10	(0)
2013–2014	→ Real Vicenza (loan)	12	(0)
2014–2015	→ Martina Franca (loan)	14	(2)
2015–2016	Olhanense	4	(0)
2016	Mestre	12	(4)
2016	Ostia Mare	12	(4)
2016–2017	FC Calvi Noale	20	(8)
2017–2018	Matelica	32	(18)
2018–2022	Virtus Entella	37	(10)
2018–2019	→ Ravenna (loan)	19	(1)
2019	→ Cavese (loan)	12	(3)
2019–2020	→ Virtus Verona (loan)	27	(7)
2020–2021	→ Pontedera (loan)	36	(15)
2022–2024	Cittadella	64	(4)
2025–2026	Milan Futuro	45	(10)
2026–	Reggina	10	(2)
- * Club domestic league appearances and goals as of 22:45, 1 November 2026 (UTC)

Andrea Magrassi (born 6 February 1993) is an Italian professional footballer who plays as a forward for Serie D Group I club Reggina.

== Club career ==
Born in Dolo, the Province of Venice, Veneto, Magrassi started his career at A.C. Marco Polo, located in Mestre, the mainland part of the municipality of Venice. He then played for Venezia (Italian: SSC Venezia) and Brescia (ca. 2009–12). Magrassi made his Serie B debut for Brescia on 13 November 2011 against Ascoli. He substituted Denis Maccan in the second half.

=== Sampdoria ===
On 30 January 2012, Magrassi joined Sampdoria outright, but effective on 1 July 2012. That transfer window Brescia signed forwards Federico Piovaccari and Salvatore Foti in temporary deal from Sampdoria; defender Pietro Accardi in definitive deal, for free. In the other hand, Sampdoria signed forwards Magrassi (€2 million), Juan Antonio (€3 million) and defender Gaetano Berardi (€2 million) from Brescia. Magrassi signed a 4 1/2-year contract.

On 2 August 2012, he left for Portogruaro.

On 30 August 2013 he left for Real Vicenza.

On 1 September 2014, he was signed by Martina Franca in a temporary deal.

=== Olhanense ===
On 31 August 2015, Magrassi was sold to Portuguese Second Division club Olhanense.

=== Virtus Entella ===
On 31 January 2019, he joined Cavese on loan.

On 30 July 2019, he moved to Virtus Verona on loan.

On 21 September 2020 he joined Serie C club Pontedera on a season-long loan.

=== Cittadella ===
On 31 August 2022, Magrassi signed with Cittadella.

=== Milan Futuro ===
On 2 January 2025, he joined the newly created Serie C club Milan Futuro, which serves as the reserve team of Serie A club AC Milan.

Magrassi scored the second goal for Milan Futuro, during the 3–2 home loss Coppa Italia Serie D elimination match game against Varesina for which he started, on 29 October 2025.

On 31 August 2026, his contract with Milan was mutually terminated, making him a free agent ahead of the 2026–27 season.

=== Reggina ===
On 1 September 2026, Magrassi signed with Serie D club Reggina, as a free agent, ahead of the 2026–27 season.
