= Lorenzo Carissoni =

Italian footballer

Personal information
- Date of birth: 7 February 1997 (age 29)
- Place of birth: San Giovanni Bianco, Italy
- Height: 1.77 m (5 ft 10 in)
- Positions: Right-back; left-back

Team information
- Current team: Padova
- Number: 24

Youth career
- 2012–2015: Pontisola
- 2015–2016: Torino

Senior career*
Years	Team	Apps	(Gls)
2014–2015	Pontisola	30	(0)
2015–2021	Torino	0	(0)
2016–2017	→ Trapani Calcio (loan)	1	(0)
2017	→ Monopoli (loan)	14	(0)
2017–2018	→ Monza (loan)	26	(0)
2018–2019	→ Carrarese (loan)	35	(0)
2019–2020	→ Lecco (loan)	22	(2)
2021	Vis Pesaro	16	(0)
2021–2023	Latina	52	(2)
2023–2026	Cittadella	69	(4)
2025–2026	→ Juve Stabia (loan)	36	(6)
2026	Juve Stabia	0	(0)
2026–	Padova	1	(0)

International career
2015	Italy U-19	1	(0)
- * Club domestic league appearances and goals as of 23 August 2026

Lorenzo Carissoni (born 7 February 1997) is an Italian professional footballer who plays as a right-back or left-back for Serie B club Padova.

== Club career ==
On 3 August 2019, he joined Lecco on loan.

On 1 February 2021, he moved to Vis Pesaro.

On 18 November 2021, he signed with Latina.

On 14 June 2023, it was announced that Carissoni would join Serie B club Cittadella on a free transfer from 1 July.

On 12 July 2025, Carissoni was loaned by Juve Stabia, with a conditional obligation to buy.
