= Edoardo Sottini =

Italian footballer (born 2002)

Personal information
- Date of birth: 18 August 2002 (age 24)
- Place of birth: Brescia, Italy
- Height: 1.91 m (6 ft 3 in)
- Position: Defender

Team information
- Current team: AlbinoLeffe
- Number: 23

Youth career
- –2016: Cremonese
- 2016–2021: Inter Milan

Senior career*
| Years | Team | Apps | (Gls) |
| 2021–2023 | Inter Milan | 0 | (0) |
| 2021–2022 | → Pistoiese (loan) | 31 | (4) |
| 2022–2023 | → Triestina (loan) | 10 | (0) |
| 2023 | → Avellino (loan) | 5 | (0) |
| 2023–2024 | Cittadella | 9 | (0) |
| 2024–2025 | SPAL | 8 | (0) |
| 2025– | AlbinoLeffe | 33 | (0) |
- * Club domestic league appearances and goals as of 30 April 2026

Edoardo Sottini (born 18 August 2002) is an Italian professional footballer who plays as a defender for Serie C Group A club AlbinoLeffe.

== Club career ==
On 18 August 2021, Sottini was loaned to Serie C club Pistoiese.

On 25 July 2022, Sottini joined Triestina on loan.

On 31 January 2023, Sottini moved on a new loan at Avellino.

On 4 July 2023, Sottini moved to Cittadella on permanent basis.

On 29 August 2024, Sottini signed a three-year contract with SPAL.

== Career statistics ==
=== Club ===
As of 15 May 2022

| Club | Season | League | | | Cup | | Europe | | Other | | Total | |
| Club | Season | League | Apps | Goals | Apps | Goals | Apps | Goals | Apps | Goals | Apps | Goals |
|---|---|---|---|---|---|---|---|---|---|---|---|---|
| Pistoiese (loan) | 2021–22 | Serie C | 31 | 4 | 1 | 0 | — | | 1 (Note: All appearance(s) in Serie C play-out.) | 0 | 33 | 4 |
| Career total | | | 31 | 4 | 1 | 0 | — | | 1 | 0 | 33 | 4 |
