= Francesco Forte (footballer, born 1998) =

Italian football player

Personal information
- Date of birth: 13 November 1998 (age 27)
- Place of birth: Pozzuoli, Italy
- Height: 1.87 m (6 ft 2 in)
- Position: Centre back

Team information
- Current team: Real Aversa

Youth career
- –2015: Paganese
- 2015–2017: Pescara
- 2017: → Atalanta (loan)

Senior career*
Years	Team	Apps	(Gls)
2016–2017	Pescara	0	(0)
2017–2019	Casertana	2	(0)
2018–2019	→ Fidelis Andria (loan)	33	(2)
2019	Messina	2	(0)
2019–2020	Fidelis Andria	9	(0)
2020–2021	Molfetta	14	(0)
2021–2023	Afragolese	50	(2)
2023	Avezzano	1	(0)
2023–2025	Manfredonia	51	(0)
2025–2026	Savoia	26	(2)
2026–	Real Aversa	0	(0)
- * Club domestic league appearances and goals as of 3 May 2026

Francesco Forte (born 13 November 1998) is an Italian football player who plays for Serie D club Real Aversa.

== Club career ==
He made his Serie C debut for Casertana on 7 November 2017 in a game against Lecce.

On 9 July 2019 he joined ACR Messina in Serie D. He left the club in December 2019 to rejoin fellow league club Fidelis Andria.
