= Denis Maccan =

Italian footballer (born 1984)

Personal information
- Date of birth: 19 May 1984 (age 42)
- Place of birth: Pordenone, Italy
- Height: 1.84 m (6 ft 0 in)
- Position: Forward

Team information
- Current team: Portogruaro

Senior career*
| Years | Team | Apps | (Gls) |
| 2003–2004 | Arezzo | 16 | (0) |
| 2004–2005 | Sora | 3 | (0) |
| 2004–2005 | Sangiovannese | 7 | (0) |
| 2005–2006 | Modica | 14 | (3) |
| 2005–2006 | Venezia | 15 | (1) |
| 2006–2007 | Lumezzane | 7 | (3) |
| 2006–2007 | Brescia | 5 | (1) |
| 2007–2008 | Lumezzane | 32 | (20) |
| 2008–2013 | Brescia | 8 | (0) |
| 2008–2009 | → Perugia (loan) | 4 | (0) |
| 2009–2010 | → Andria BAT (loan) | 9 | (1) |
| 2010–2011 | → Pergocrema (loan) | 23 | (0) |
| 2012–2013 | → Fidelis Andria (loan) | 23 | (1) |
| 2013–2015 | Pordenone | 52 | (15) |
| 2015–2016 | Venezia | 24 | (7) |
| 2016–2017 | Cordenons | 29 | (19) |
| 2017–2019 | Tamai | 62 | (32) |
| 2019– | Portogruaro | 0 | (0) |
- * Club domestic league appearances and goals as of 00:20, 19 July 2019 (UTC)

Denis Maccan (born 19 May 1984) is an Italian footballer who plays as a forward, currently for Portogruaro.

== Career statistics ==
Serie B : 13 caps, 1 goal

Serie C1 : 62 caps, 1 goal

Serie C2 : 68 caps, 26 goals

Total : 143 caps, 28 goals
