= Luca Pandolfi =

Italian footballer

Personal information
- Date of birth: 14 March 1998 (age 28)
- Place of birth: Naples, Italy
- Height: 1.86 m (6 ft 1 in)
- Position: Forward

Team information
- Current team: Avellino
- Number: 8

Youth career
- Altovicentino

Senior career*
Years	Team	Apps	(Gls)
2016–2017	Altovicentino		
2017	Melfi	1	(0)
2017–2018	Portici 1906		
2018–2019	Castrovillari		
2019–2020	Virtus Entella	0	(0)
2019–2020	→ Alessandria (loan)	12	(2)
2020	→ Arezzo (loan)	3	(0)
2020–2021	Turris	21	(6)
2021	→ Brescia (loan)	0	(0)
2021–2023	Cosenza	17	(0)
2022–2023	→ Juve Stabia (loan)	36	(6)
2023–2026	Cittadella	67	(16)
2025–2026	→ Catanzaro (loan)	11	(0)
2026–	Avellino	5	(0)
- * Club domestic league appearances and goals as of 10 May 2026

Luca Pandolfi (born 14 March 1998) is an Italian professional footballer who plays as a forward for Serie B club Avellino.

== Career ==
=== Arezzo ===
In January 2020, Pandolfi moved to Arezzo of Serie C. He made his league debut for the club on 9 February 2020, coming on as a 79th-minute substitute for Niccolò Belloni in a 1–1 draw with Como.

=== Turris ===
On 1 September 2020, he signed a two-year contract with Turris, recently promoted to Serie C. On 1 February 2021, he was loaned to Serie B club Brescia.

=== Cosenza and loan to Juve Stabia ===
On 31 August 2021, he moved to Cosenza on a three-year contract.

On 29 July 2022, Pandolfi moved to Juve Stabia on loan with an option to buy.

=== Cittadella ===
On 10 August 2023, he joined Cittadella on a permanent basis.

=== Catanzaro ===
On 30 August 2025, Pandolfi moved to Catanzaro on loan with an obligation to buy.

=== Avellino ===
On 2 February 2026, Pandolfi signed a three-and-a-half-year contract with Avellino.
