= Tommy Maistrello =

Italian footballer

Personal information
- Date of birth: 24 June 1993 (age 33)
- Place of birth: Correggio, Italy
- Height: 1.93 m (6 ft 4 in)
- Position: Forward

Youth career
- –2012: Abano
- 2012: → Parma (loan)
- 2012–2013: Bassano

Senior career*
Years	Team	Apps	(Gls)
2010–2011	Abano	?	(9)
2013–2018	Bassano	101	(22)
2017–2018	→ Ravenna (loan)	33	(3)
2018–2019	Vicenza	24	(2)
2019	Monopoli	1	(0)
2019–2021	Fermana	24	(3)
2020–2021	→ Renate (loan)	36	(7)
2021–2023	Renate	58	(19)
2023–2024	Cittadella	51	(7)
2024–2025	Feralpisalò	18	(4)
2025–2026	Union Brescia	17	(4)
- * Club domestic league appearances and goals as of 29 April 2026

Tommy Maistrello (born 24 June 1993) is an Italian professional footballer who plays as a forward.

== Club career ==
Maistrello made his senior debut for Eccellenza club Abano at 17 years old. Then, he joined to Bassano youth system.

He made his professional debut on 23 September 2012 for Serie C2 against Castiglione.

On 2 July 2021, he joined Renate on a permanent deal, after one season on loan in the club.

On 9 January 2023, Maistrello joined Serie B side Cittadella on a permanent deal.

On 30 August 2024, Maistrello signed a two-year contract with Feralpisalò.
