= Raúl Asencio (footballer, born 1998) =

Spanish footballer (born 1998)

Personal information
- Full name: Raúl José Asencio Moraes
- Date of birth: 20 May 1998 (age 28)
- Place of birth: Castellón, Spain
- Height: 1.87 m (6 ft 2 in)
- Position: Forward

Youth career
- Burriana

Senior career*
Years	Team	Apps	(Gls)
2015–2021	Genoa	0	(0)
2017–2018	→ Avellino (loan)	31	(7)
2018–2019	→ Benevento (loan)	21	(3)
2019–2020	→ Pisa (loan)	3	(0)
2020-2021	→ Cosenza (loan)	15	(7)
2020–2021	→ Pescara (loan)	4	(0)
2021	→ SPAL (loan)	13	(0)
2021–2022	Alcorcón	15	(2)
2022	Lecce	5	(0)
2022–2023	Cittadella	17	(2)
2023–2024	Potenza	24	(0)
2024–2025	Casertana	12	(1)
2025	Novara	9	(1)
2026	Piacenza	4	(0)
- * Club domestic league appearances and goals as of 20 June 2026

Raúl José Asencio Moraes (born 20 May 1998) is a Spanish footballer who plays as a forward.

== Club career ==
=== Genoa ===
A graduate of the Burriana youth setup, Asencio won the attraction of Villarreal and Valencia while he played for the academy. On 15 July 2015, he signed for Italian club Genoa on a three-year deal and was initially assigned to the club's B-team. In the 2016–17 season with the reserves, he scored two braces, one against Ternana and another against Pisa.

==== Loan to Avellino ====
In order to gain first team opportunities, Asencio joined Italian second tier club Avellino on 6 July 2017 on a season-long loan deal. However, failing to break to a first team, rumours arose of his parent club recalling him so that he could be loaned to any other club. However, in an interview given in August, Asencio denied this rumour. On 13 August, Asencio made his professional debut for Avellino in the third round of Coppa Italia as a substitute replacing Soufiane Bidaoui in the 68th minute of a 3–1 away defeat against Hellas Verona. On 26 August he made his debut in Serie B as a substitute replacing Matteo Ardemagni in the 91st minute of a 2–1 home win over Brescia. On 23 September he played his first entire match for Avellino, a 2–1 away win over Novara. On 24 October, Asencio score his first professional goal, and the winning goal in the 69th minute of a 1–0 home win against Pro Vercelli. On 28 December he scored his second goal in the 24th minute of a 2–1 home win over Ternana. On 3 February 2018, Asencio scored his third goal in the 10th minute of a 2–1 away defeat against Foggia. On 11 March he was sent off, as a substitute, with a red card in the 93rd minute of a 2–0 away defeat against Salernitana. Asencio ended his loan to Avellino with 32 appearances, 7 goals and 1 assist.

==== Loan to Benevento ====
On 3 August 2018, Asencio was loaned out to Benevento on a season-long loan. On 27 August he made his Serie B debut for Benevento as a substitute replacing Riccardo Improta in the 70th minute of a 3–3 home draw against Lecce. On 21 September he scored his first goal for the club, as a substitute, in the 95th minute of a 4–0 home win over Salernitana. Four days later, on 25 September, he played his first entire match for Benevento and he scored his second goal in the 37th minute of a 1–0 away win over Cittadella. On 4 December he played as a 73rd-minute substitute in a 1–0 home win over Cittadella in the fourth rund of Coppa Italia. On 14 April 2019, Asencio scored his third goal in the 89th minute of a 2–1 home defeat against Palermo. Asencio ended his loan with 23 appearances, 3 goals and 3 assists.

==== Loan to Pisa ====
On 6 August 2019, Asencio joined Serie B club Pisa on loan until 30 June 2020. His loan was terminated early with 3 league appearances and 1 Coppa Italia appearance, all as substitute.

==== Loan to Cosenza ====
On 17 January 2020, he moved on loan to Cosenza in Serie B until the end of the season.

==== Loan to Pescara ====
After appearing on the bench for Genoa in their first 2020–21 Serie A game against Crotone, on 28 September 2020 he joined Pescara on loan.

==== Loan to SPAL ====
On 1 February 2021, Asencio joined Serie B club SPAL, on a loan deal.

=== Alcorcón ===
Asencio returned to Spain on 10 August 2021, after signing a two-year contract with Segunda División side AD Alcorcón. On 20 December, he posted a story on his Instagram profile showing himself driving at over 160 kilometres per hour while holding a coffee with the other hand; the following day, his contract with the club was terminated.

=== Lecce ===
On 20 January 2022, he returned to Italy and signed a contract with Lecce until 30 June 2022, with an option to extend for another season and another 3-year extension option.

=== Cittadella ===
On 21 June 2022, Asencio moved to Serie B club Cittadella.

=== Potenza ===
On 27 August 2023, Asencio signed a two-year contract with Potenza in Serie C.

=== Casertana ===
On 2 September 2024, Asencio signed with Casertana.

== Career statistics ==
=== Club ===
As of 7 August 2019

Club	Season	League			Cup		Europe		Other		Total	
Club	Season	League	Apps	Goals	Apps	Goals	Apps	Goals	Apps	Goals	Apps	Goals
Avellino (loan)	2017–18	Serie B	31	7	1	0	—		—		32	7
Benevento (loan)	2018–19	Serie B	21	3	1	0	—		1 (Note: All appearance(s) in Serie B play-off.)	0	23	3
Career total			52	10	1	0	—		1	0	54	10
