= Matteo Angeli =

Italian professional footballer (born 2002)

Personal information
- Date of birth: 30 December 2002 (age 23)
- Place of birth: Cuneo, Italy
- Height: 1.85 m (6 ft 1 in)
- Position: Defender

Youth career
- Cuneo
- Torino
- 2018–2020: Milan

Senior career*
Years	Team	Apps	(Gls)
2020–2022	Imolese	42	(7)
2022–2023	Bologna	0	(0)
2022–2023	→ Renate (loan)	38	(4)
2023–2026	Cittadella	47	(0)
- * Club domestic league appearances and goals as of 29 April 2026

Matteo Angeli (born 30 December 2002) is a professional Italian footballer who plays as a defender.

== Career ==
=== Early career ===
At the start of his career, he played in the youth sectors of Cuneo and Torino before moving to Milan in 2018.

=== Imolese ===
On 28 August 2020 he moved to Imolese. On 16 January 2021, he made his debut into professional football in the 2–0 win against Matelica.

=== Bologna and loan to Renate ===
On 6 July 2022, Angeli signed with Serie A club Bologna. After remaining on the bench in the first three games of the 2022–23 Serie A season, on 30 August 2022 Angeli moved on loan to Renate.

=== Cittadella ===
On 7 July 2023, he joined Serie B club Cittadella on permanent basis.

== Career statistics ==
As of match played 7 July 2022

Club	Season	League			Cup		Continental		Other		Total	
Club	Season	Division	Apps	Goals	Apps	Goals	Apps	Goals	Apps	Goals	Apps	Goals
Imolese	2020–21	Serie C	13	0	0	0	–		0	0	13	0
Imolese	2021–22	Serie C	33	7	0	0	–		0	0	33	7
Imolese	Total		46	7	0	0	–		0	0	0	0
Bologna	2022–23	Serie A	0	0	0	0	–		0	0	0	0
Career total			46	7	0	0	–		0	0	46	7
