= AS Pizzighettone =

Italian football club

Pizzighettone
- Full name: Associazione Sportiva Pizzighettone SRL
- Nickname: Biancoazzuri (White-Light Blues)
- Founded: 1919
- Dissolved: 2012
- Ground: Stadio Comunale, Pizzighettone
- Capacity: 2,500
Home colours	Away colours

Associazione Sportiva Pizzighettone was an Italian association football club, based in Pizzighettone, Lombardy.

== History ==
The club was founded in 1919 and up to season 1994–95 took part just to regional amateur championships, such as Eccellenza Lombardy. In 1995, the club promoted to Serie D, the top division of amateur football, which also a cross-regional league.

After a long history of amateur leagues for years, in 2003 the team was promoted to Serie C2 for the first time in their history, under their coach Roberto Venturato.

Having won promotion playoffs in 2005, Pizzighettone were promoted to Serie C1. It was relegated to Serie C2 in 2007 after play-out.

The following year it was relegated to Serie D, but it was readmitted in 2008–09 Lega Pro Seconda Divisione (ex-Serie C2). In this season it was again relegated to Serie D.

After the bankruptcy of U.S. Pergocrema 1932, Pizzighettone moved to Crema and changed to the color and name of Pergocrema's predecessor: U.S. Pergolettese 1932.

== Legacy ==
Since 2013, Real Pizzighettone became the major football team of the town. The club was relegated to Seconda Categoria in 2016.

== Colours and badge ==
The team's colours are white and light blue.

== Players ==
Players with international caps include:

- (Italy) Davide Astori (2006–07)
- (Bulgaria) Krassimir Chomakov (2006–07)
- (Italy) Sergio Porrini (2004–09)
