= Mario Gargiulo =

Italian footballer

Personal information
- Date of birth: 26 March 1996 (age 30)
- Place of birth: Naples, Italy
- Height: 1.85 m (6 ft 1 in)
- Position: Midfielder

Team information
- Current team: Campobasso
- Number: 5

Youth career
- –2014: Brescia

Senior career*
Years	Team	Apps	(Gls)
2013–2014	Brescia	0	(0)
2014–2017	Chievo	0	(0)
2014–2015	→ Brescia (loan)	6	(0)
2015–2016	→ Bassano (loan)	4	(0)
2016–2017	→ Lucchese (loan)	21	(0)
2017–2018	Pontedera	36	(1)
2018–2019	Imolese	39	(3)
2019–2021	Cittadella	57	(9)
2021–2022	Lecce	32	(3)
2022–2024	Modena	15	(0)
2023	→ Pisa (loan)	12	(1)
2024–2025	Foggia	18	(0)
2025	Cosenza	17	(1)
2025–	Campobasso	34	(3)
- * Club domestic league appearances and goals as of 30 April 2026

Mario Gargiulo (born 26 March 1996) is an Italian footballer who plays as a midfielder for Serie C Group B club Campobasso.

== Club career ==
Gargiulo is a youth exponent from Brescia Calcio. He made his debut on 30 August 2014 against Frosinone Calcio in a Serie B game.

On 2 July 2019, he signed with Cittadella.

On 21 July 2022, Gargiulo signed a three-year contract with Modena. On 31 January 2023, he was loaned to Pisa, with an option to buy.

On 29 August 2024, Gargiulo joined Foggia.

On 15 January 2025, Gargiulo moved to Cosenza in Serie B on a one-and-a-half-year deal.
