= Giuseppe Carriero =

Italian footballer

Personal information
- Date of birth: 4 September 1997 (age 29)
- Place of birth: Desio, Italy
- Height: 1.77 m (5 ft 9 1/2 in)
- Position: Midfielder

Team information
- Current team: Perugia
- Number: 20

Youth career
- –2014: Renate

Senior career*
Years	Team	Apps	(Gls)
2015–2016	Sporting Bellinzago	51	(4)
2016–2018	Casertana	61	(4)
2018–2021	Parma	0	(0)
2019	→ Catania (loan)	15	(1)
2019–2020	→ Monopoli (loan)	29	(4)
2021–2022	Avellino	44	(4)
2022–2024	Cittadella	64	(4)
2024–2026	Trapani	33	(0)
2026	Salernitana	12	(0)
2026–	Perugia	2	(0)
- * Club domestic league appearances and goals as of 30 August 2026

Giuseppe Carriero (born 4 September 1997) is an Italian footballer who plays as a midfielder for Serie C Group B club Perugia.

== Club career ==
Carriero made 61 appearances in Casertana in Serie C. Carriero signed a three-and-a-half-year contract with Parma in January 2018 but was loaned back to Casertana until the end of the 2017–18 season.

On 12 January 2019, he was loaned to Catania until 30 June 2019.

On 12 August 2019, he joined Monopoli on loan with an option to buy.

During his time with Parma, he appeared twice on the bench in Coppa Italia games.

On 5 January 2021, he signed a 3-year contract with Avellino.

On 18 July 2022, Carriero moved to Cittadella.

On 13 August 2024, Carriero signed a two-year contract with Trapani.
