= Roberto Venturato =

Italian footballer (born 1963)

Personal information
- Date of birth: 14 April 1963 (age 63)
- Place of birth: Atherton, Queensland, Australia
- Position: Midfielder

Senior career*
Years	Team	Apps	(Gls)
1980–1982	Montebelluna	29	(0)
1982–1983	Cremonese	0	(0)
1983–1984	Pergocrema	0	(0)
1984–1987	Giorgione	68	(7)
1987–1990	Pergocrema	87	(8)
1990–1991	Venezia	31	(5)
1991–1993	Pergocrema	65	(6)
1993–1994	Treviso	24	(0)
1994–1996	Pizzighettone	33	(1)

Managerial career
- 1996–2002: Pizzighettone (Youth)
- 2002–2007: Pizzighettone
- 2007–2009: Cremonese (Assistant)
- 2009–2010: Cremonese
- 2012–2013: Castellana
- 2013–2014: Piacenza
- 2014–2015: Pergolettese
- 2015–2021: Cittadella
- 2022: SPAL
- 2025–2026: Livorno
- * Club domestic league appearances and goals

Roberto Venturato (born 14 April 1963) is an Australian-born Italian football coach and former player.

== Playing career ==
Venturato was born in Australia to Italian immigrants who moved back to Veneto in 1973. A midfielder, he spent the majority of his career playing in the minor professional leagues of Italy (as well as amateur level) for a number of teams, most notably Cremonese and Pergocrema. He retired in 1996 after two seasons with then-amateurs Pizzighettone.

== Coaching career ==
After retiring from active football, Venturato stayed at Pizzighettone, where he took over a role as youth coach and non-playing staff member. In 2002, he was named the new head coach and guided the club to win the Serie D title, thus ensuring a historic first promotion to the professional football ranks for the small Lombardian club. In 2005, he won one further promotion, guiding Pizzighettone to win the Serie C2 playoffs, and remained at the club until 2007, serving as head coach for two full seasons at Serie C1 level.

After relegation in 2007, Venturato left Pizzighettone to serve as Emiliano Mondonico's assistant at Cremonese. He stayed at Cremonese also in 2008 as Ivo Iaconi's assistant, a role he maintained also after the reappointment of Mondonico during that very season. In March 2009, he replaced Mondonico as the new head coach of Cremonese, serving in this role until June 2010, when he left after losing the Serie C1 promotion playoff final to Varese.

After two years without a club during which he took a job as a financial promoter, Venturato moved back into management as head coach of Serie D club Pergolettese (heir of his former playing club Pergocrema), which he promptly guided to promotion to Serie C2 on his first and only season in charge. In October 2013, he took over at Serie D club Piacenza, but was removed from his managerial duties in January 2014 due to poor results. He successively returned to Pergolettese (now back to Serie D) the following season.

In July 2015 Venturato was named new head coach of Cittadella in the Lega Pro league, replacing long-time manager Claudio Foscarini. On his first full season in charge, Foscarini won promotion to Serie B as Lega Pro champions, and was confirmed for the club's 2016–17 Serie B campaign, which Venturato started with style thanks to five consecutive wins in the first five games of the season.

In the 2018–19 Serie B season, Venturato successfully led Cittadella to seventh place in the regular season and then a spot in the promotion playoff finals, eliminating third-placed Benevento in the semi-finals. Venturato left Cittadella by the end of the 2020–21 Serie B season, after six years in charge, following a 2–1 aggregate defeat to Venezia in the promotion playoff finals.

On 5 January 2022, he was appointed new head coach of Serie B club SPAL, signing a one-and-a-half-year contract. He was dismissed on 9 October 2022, following a 2–0 loss at Frosinone, leaving SPAL in fourteenth place in the 2022–23 Serie B league table.

On 12 November 2025, after more than three years without a job, Venturato was hired as the new head coach of Livorno in the Serie C league.

== Managerial statistics ==
As of match played 1 October 2022

Managerial record by team and tenure
Team	Nat	From	To	Record							
Team	Nat	From	To	G	W	D	L	GF	GA	GD	Win %
Pizzighettone	(Italy)	22 May 2002	7 June 2007	200	70	70	60	223	212	+11	35.00
Cremonese	(Italy)	26 March 2009	21 June 2010	50	24	15	11	80	61	+19	48.00
Castellana	(Italy)	1 July 2012	27 May 2013	39	15	13	11	50	46	+4	38.46
Piacenza	(Italy)	29 October 2013	8 January 2014	9	4	1	4	14	17	−3	44.44
Pergolettese	(Italy)	23 June 2014	20 June 2015	38	15	12	11	48	49	−1	39.47
Cittadella	(Italy)	10 July 2015	29 June 2021	270	123	66	81	406	319	+87	45.56
SPAL	(Italy)	5 January 2022	9 October 2022	27	7	12	8	34	38	−4	25.93
Total				633	258	189	186	855	742	+113	40.76
