= Romano Perticone =

Italian footballer

Personal information
- Date of birth: 13 August 1986 (age 40)
- Place of birth: Melzo, Italy
- Height: 1.83 m (6 ft 0 in)
- Position: Defender

Team information
- Current team: Treviso

Youth career
- –1997: Cimiano
- 1997–1999: Melpum
- 1999–2005: AC Milan

Senior career*
Years	Team	Apps	(Gls)
2005–2008	AC Milan	1	(0)
2005–2006	→ Pizzighettone (loan)	22	(0)
2006–2007	→ Hellas Verona (loan)	13	(0)
2007–2008	→ Cremonese (loan)	23	(2)
2008–2012	Livorno	97	(3)
2011	→ Sampdoria (loan)	0	(0)
2012	→ Modena (loan)	14	(0)
2012–2015	Novara	62	(2)
2014–2015	→ Empoli (loan)	0	(0)
2015	→ Trapani (loan)	14	(0)
2015–2016	Trapani	36	(1)
2016–2018	Cesena	57	(0)
2018–2019	Salernitana	10	(0)
2019–2023	Cittadella	93	(0)
2023–	Treviso	0	(0)

International career
2003	Italy U18	1	(0)
2005	Italy U19	2	(0)
2005	Italy U20	1	(0)
- * Club domestic league appearances and goals as of 13 July 2023

Romano Perticone (born 13 August 1986) is an Italian professional footballer who plays as a defender for Serie D club Treviso.

== Career ==
=== AC Milan ===
In the 2004–05 season, he was awarded no.47 shirt of the AC Milan first team.

=== Livorno ===
After three seasons on loan, Perticone left for Livorno along with Marcus Diniz in co-ownership deals for a total fee of €900,000. Which Perticone's half was valued for €600,000. In June 2009 Livorno acquired Perticone outright for €2.5 million, but also sold Diniz back to Milan for €2.5 million.

=== Novara ===
In summer 2012, Perticone was signed by Novara Calcio for €900,000 in a four-year contract, with Giuseppe Gemiti moved to Livorno also for €900,000. In summer 2014 Perticone was signed by Empoli F.C., with Luca Martinelli moved to opposite direction also on loan.

=== Trapani ===
On 22 January 2015, he left for Trapani in a temporary deal. On 21 June 2015, Trapani excised the option to sign him outright from Novara.

=== Salernitana ===
On 25 July 2018, he signed a two-year contract with an option for the third year with Serie B club Salernitana.

=== Cittadella ===
On 2 September 2019, he signed with Cittadella.

=== Treviso ===
On 29 July 2023, Perticone signed with Treviso in Serie D.
