= Mamadou Tounkara (footballer, born 1996) =

Spanish-Sengalese footballer

Personal information
- Date of birth: 19 January 1996 (age 30)
- Place of birth: Blanes, Spain
- Height: 1.84 m (6 ft 0 in)
- Position: Forward

Team information
- Current team: Guidonia Montecelio
- Number: 9

Youth career
- 2009–2012: Barcelona
- 2011–2012: → Farners (loan)
- 2012–2015: Lazio

Senior career*
Years	Team	Apps	(Gls)
2014–2019	Lazio	2	(0)
2015–2016	→ Crotone (loan)	7	(1)
2016–2017	→ Salernitana (loan)	1	(0)
2018	→ Flamurtari (loan)	7	(0)
2018	→ Schaffhausen (loan)	9	(0)
2019	→ Zemplín Michalovce (loan)	9	(2)
2019–2021	Viterbese	49	(16)
2021–2023	Cittadella	31	(2)
2023	→ Avellino (loan)	9	(1)
2023	Avellino	0	(0)
2023–2024	Foggia	11	(0)
2024	Avezzano	12	(1)
2024–2025	Guidonia Montecelio	10	(2)
2026	Pompei	0	(0)
2026–	Guidonia Montecelio	7	(0)
- * Club domestic league appearances and goals as of 30 April 2026

Mamadou Tounkara (born 19 January 1996) is a Spanish-born Senegalese footballer who plays as a forward for Italian Serie C club Guidonia Montecelio.

== Club career ==
=== Early career ===
Born in Blanes, Girona, Catalonia, to Senegalese parents, Tounkara first began playing football with FC Barcelona's youth academy. In 2011, he was loaned to CE Farners in Selva. Tounkara had a release clause of 3 million euro written into his Barcelona contract but injuries saw the club lose interest in the striker.

=== Lazio ===
After his Barcelona contract expired, Serie A club Lazio signed Tounkara to a three-year deal in August 2012. In Rome, he joined his former Barcelona teammate Keita Baldé. Tounkara spent his first two seasons with the club playing in the Primavera youth team, first under Alberto Bollini and later under Simone Inzaghi. As a promising player, he was also selected to join the senior squad at pre-season camp in Auronzo di Cadore.

Having been training with the first team, Tounkara made his Serie A debut in the final match of the 2013–14 season, which Lazio won 1–0 at the Stadio Olimpico against Bologna. Tounkara came off the bench to replace Miroslav Klose in the 81st minute of the game.

==== Crotone (loan) ====
In July 2015, Mamadou Tounkara was transferred to Crotone on loan. The deal included a buy-out option for Crotone, while Lazio have a buy-back option.

==== Salernitana (loan) ====
On 1 February 2016, Tounkara joined Salernitana on loan until the end of the season.

==== Flamurtari (loan) ====
On 30 January 2017, Tounkara joined Flamurtari on loan until the end of the season.

==== Schaffhausen (loan) ====
On 3 July 2018, Tounkara joined Schaffhausen on loan.

==== Zemplín Michalovce (loan) ====
On 1 February 2019, he joined Zemplín Michalovce on loan.

=== Viterbese ===
On 11 August 2019, he transferred to Serie C club Viterbese and signed a 2-year contract.

=== Cittadella ===
On 14 July 2021, he joined Serie B side Cittadella.

=== Avellino ===
On 19 January 2023, he transferred to Serie C club Avellino on loan with an obligation to buy. After the obligation to buy was triggered, Tounkara's contract with Avellino was terminated by mutual consent on 28 July 2023.

=== Avezzano ===
In December 2023 he joined Italian Serie D team Avezzano, signing a one-and-a-half-year contract.

=== Guidonia Montecelio ===
On 12 August 2024, he joined Serie D side Guidonia Montecelio. On 31 March 2025, his contract was terminated by the club. In April 2025, he was given a ten-month ban by the FIGC for "attempted gambling misconduct". On 6 March 2026, he returned to the club.

== International career ==
I am Senegalese, and I support our national team. It's true that I am binational, but I've already discussed with all my family. I am ready to come and defend the colours of my country.

— Mamadou Tounkara

Tounkara is eligible to represent both Spain and Senegal at international level. In 2012, he received a call-up to the Spain under-17 team. Four years later, Tounkara revealed his decision to play for Senegal.
