= Mirco Miori =

Italian footballer

Personal information
- Date of birth: 28 August 1995 (age 31)
- Place of birth: Romano di Lombardia, Italy
- Height: 1.91 m (6 ft 3 in)
- Position: Goalkeeper

Youth career
- –2014: Atalanta

Senior career*
Years	Team	Apps	(Gls)
2014–2019	Atalanta	0	(0)
2014–2016	→ Südtirol (loan)	24	(0)
2016–2017	→ Piacenza (loan)	32	(0)
2017	→ Fano (loan)	16	(0)
2018	→ Triestina (loan)	2	(0)
2019	ASD Adrense	3	(0)
2020	FC Emmenbrücke		
2020–2021	Tritium		
- * Club domestic league appearances and goals as of 01:49, 18 June 2024 (UTC)

Mirco Miori (born 28 August 1995) is an Italian footballer who most recently played as a goalkeeper for Tritium.

== Career ==
Miori made his Serie C debut for Südtirol on 7 March 2015 in a game against Real Vicenza.

In February 2020, Miori joined Swiss club FC Emmenbrücke.
