= Simone Icardi =

Italian footballer

Personal information
- Date of birth: 13 September 1996 (age 30)
- Place of birth: Rome, Italy
- Height: 1.83 m (6 ft 0 in)
- Position: Midfielder

Team information
- Current team: Trastevere

Senior career*
Years	Team	Apps	(Gls)
2014–2016	Lupa Castelli Romani	38	(4)
2016–2018	Catanzaro	37	(3)
2018–2020	Virtus Entella	42	(3)
2020	→ Siena (loan)	6	(0)
2020–2021	Casertana	29	(3)
2021–2023	Cittadella	13	(0)
2022–2023	→ Feralpisalò (loan)	24	(2)
2023–2024	Ostiamare	30	(9)
2024–2025	Guidonia	18	(2)
2025	Roma City	13	(1)
2025	Nocerina	0	(0)
2025–	Trastevere	18	(3)
- * Club domestic league appearances and goals as of 22 Juny 2026

Simone Icardi (born 13 September 1996) is an Italian footballer who plays for Serie D club Trastevere.

== Club career ==
He made his Serie C debut for Lupa Castelli Romani on 6 September 2015 in a game against Ischia.

On 17 January 2020, he joined Siena on loan.

On 19 September 2020, he signed a 2-year contract with Casertana.

On 10 August 2021, he joined to Serie B side Cittadella. On 1 September 2022, Icardi was loaned to Feralpisalò.

On 17 July 2023, Icardi moved to Ostiamare in Serie D.
