= Andrea Danzi =

Italian professional footballer (born 1999)

Personal information
- Date of birth: 25 February 1999 (age 27)
- Place of birth: San Martino Buon Albergo, Italy
- Height: 1.75 m (5 ft 9 in)
- Position: Midfielder

Youth career
- Hellas Verona

Senior career*
Years	Team	Apps	(Gls)
2018–2021	Hellas Verona	20	(1)
2021	→ Ascoli (loan)	14	(0)
2021–2024	Cittadella	45	(0)
2024–2025	Foggia	18	(0)

International career^{‡}
2014	Italy U15	1	(0)
2016	Italy U18	1	(0)
2017	Italy U19	1	(0)
2018–2019	Italy U20	10	(0)
- * Club domestic league appearances and goals as of 19 April 2025 ‡ National team caps and goals as of 18 November 2019

Andrea Danzi (born 25 February 1999) is an Italian professional footballer who plays as a midfielder.

== Club career ==
Born in San Martino Buon Albergo, Danzi spent his entire youth career with Hellas Verona and rose quickly through their youth sides. On 2 July 2017, he signed his first professional contract with them, keeping him at Hellas Verona until 2021. Danzi made his professional debut for Hellas Verona in a 1–0 Serie A loss to U.S. Sassuolo Calcio on 18 April 2018.

On 25 January 2021, he moved to Ascoli on loan.

On 25 June 2021, he signed with Cittadella.

On 5 July 2024, Danzi joined Foggia on a two-year contract.
