= Valerio Mastrantonio =

Italian footballer

Personal information
- Date of birth: 22 June 1999 (age 27)
- Place of birth: Rome, Italy
- Height: 1.80 m (5 ft 11 in)
- Position: Midfielder

Team information
- Current team: Guidonia
- Number: 5

Youth career
- –2016: Calcio Romulea
- 2016–2018: Frosinone

Senior career*
Years	Team	Apps	(Gls)
2017–2020	Frosinone	0	(0)
2018–2020	→ Monterosi (loan)	60	(5)
2020–2024	Cittadella	69	(1)
2024	Trapani	4	(0)
2025–	Guidonia	36	(0)
- * Club domestic league appearances and goals as of 30 April 2026

Valerio Mastrantonio (born 22 June 1999) is an Italian football player who plays for Serie C Group B club Guidonia.

== Club career ==
He started playing on the Under-19 level for Frosinone. In November 2017, he was called up twice to their senior squad for Serie B games, but remained on the bench. He spent the first two seasons of his senior career on loan at the Serie D club Monterosi.

On 13 August 2020, he joined Serie B club Cittadella. He made his Serie B debut for Cittadella on 20 October 2020 in a game against Pordenone. He substituted Mario Gargiulo in added time.

On 13 July 2024, Mastrantonio signed a two-year contract with Trapani.
