= Edoardo Gorini =

Italian footballer and manager (born 1974)

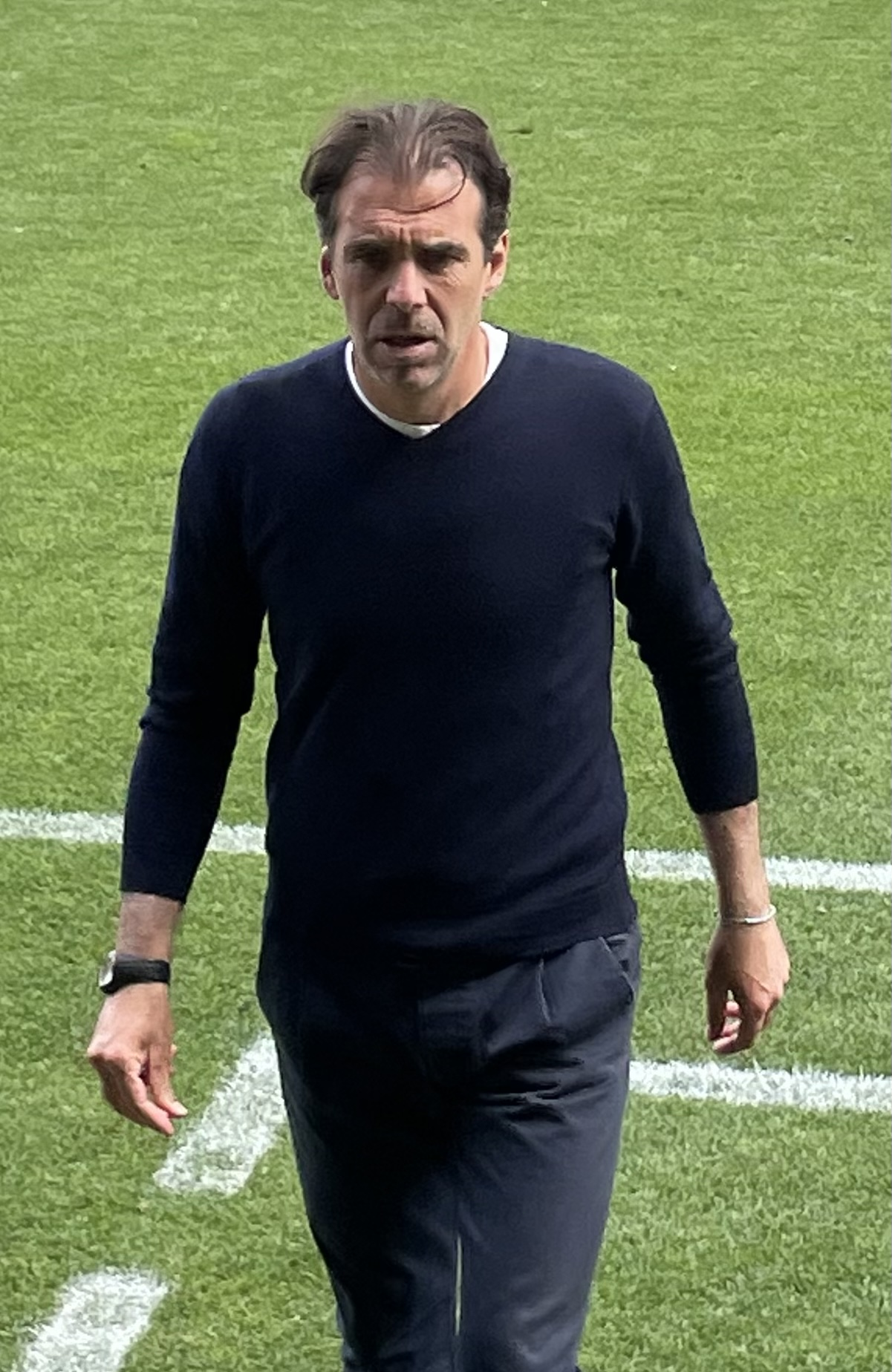
- Gorini in 2023

Personal information
- Date of birth: 28 February 1974 (age 52)
- Place of birth: Venice, Italy
- Height: 1.86 m (6 ft 1 in)
- Position: Defender

Team information
- Current team: Treviso (head coach)

Youth career
- –1993: Venezia

Senior career*
Years	Team	Apps	(Gls)
1993–1994	Corsico	30	(0)
1994–2003	Varese	252	(19)
2003–2004	AlbinoLeffe	14	(0)
2004–2006	Pavia	53	(9)
2006–2007	Ravenna	18	(1)
2007–2013	Cittadella	78	(2)
Total		445	(31)

Managerial career
- 2021–2024: Cittadella
- 2025–: Treviso
- * Club domestic league appearances and goals

Edoardo Gorini (born 28 February 1974) is an Italian professional football manager and a former player who is the head coach of Serie C Group A club Treviso.

== Playing career ==
Gorini started his career at hometown club Venezia. He successively played at Serie B level with AlbinoLeffe and Cittadella, retiring in 2013 after six seasons with the latter.

== Coaching career ==
Following his retirement as an active player, Gorini joined Cittadella's coaching staff, first as a technical collaborator, then as an assistant coach.

In 2021, following the departure of long-time head coach Roberto Venturato, Gorini was promoted to head coach of Cittadella for the club's 2021–22 Serie B campaign.

On 11 October 2024, after a series of poor results and with the team in the relegation zone, Gorini was sacked by Cittadella.

=== Treviso ===
On 8 July 2025, Gorini was appointed head coach of Serie D club Treviso, dropping into the amateur game after four seasons in Serie B with Cittadella. His side led Group C for much of the season and sealed promotion with four matches to spare on 2 April 2026, winning 1–0 away to Unione La Rocca Altavilla to return Treviso to the professional game after thirteen years. The team conceded 20 goals in winning the title, and Gorini, who was linked with Triestina after the promotion, stayed on for the club's return to Serie C.

Treviso's first competitive match back in the professional game, on 16 August 2026, ended in a 1–0 defeat away to Dolomiti Bellunesi in the first round of the Coppa Italia Serie C.

== Managerial statistics ==
As of match played 4 October 2026

Managerial record by team and tenure
Team	Nat	From	To	Record								Ref
Team	Nat	From	To	G	W	D	L	GF	GA	GD	Win %	Ref
Cittadella	(Italy)	19 July 2021	11 October 2024	129	38	44	47	128	155	−27	29.46	
Treviso	(Italy)	8 July 2025	Present	46	24	11	11	62	39	+23	52.17	
Total				175	62	55	58	190	194	−4	35.43	—

== Honours ==
=== Player ===
Varese

- Serie C2: 1997–98
- Coppa Italia Serie C: 1994–95

Ravenna

- Serie C1: 2006–07

=== Manager ===
Treviso

- Serie D Group C: 2025–26
