= Nicola Pavan =

Italian footballer

Personal information
- Date of birth: 15 June 1993 (age 33)
- Place of birth: Thiene, Italy
- Height: 1.84 m (6 ft 1/2 in)
- Position: Midfielder

Team information
- Current team: Cjarlins Muzane

Youth career
- –2012: Vicenza

Senior career*
Years	Team	Apps	(Gls)
2012–2013	Trissino-Valdagno	36	(4)
2013–2015	Real Vicenza	22	(0)
2015–2016	Pavia	11	(0)
2016	→ Renate (loan)	12	(1)
2016–2019	Renate	96	(7)
2019–2026	Cittadella	185	(6)
2026–	Cjarlins Muzane	0	(0)
- * Club domestic league appearances and goals as of 29 April 2026

Nicola Pavan (born 15 June 1993) is an Italian football player who plays for Serie D club Cjarlins Muzane.

== Club career ==
He made his Serie C debut for Real Vicenza on 15 September 2014 in a game against Pro Patria.

On 8 August 2019, he signed with Cittadella.
