= Camillo Tavernelli =

Italian footballer (born 1999)

Personal information
- Date of birth: 10 July 1999 (age 27)
- Place of birth: Città di Castello, Italy
- Height: 1.71 m (5 ft 7 in)
- Position: Forward

Team information
- Current team: Arezzo
- Number: 21

Youth career
- –2016: Sansepolcro

Senior career*
Years	Team	Apps	(Gls)
2015–2016	Sansepolcro	14	(0)
2016–2020	Gubbio	37	(0)
2020–2023	Cittadella	48	(4)
2022–2023	→ Novara (loan)	21	(3)
2023	→ Triestina (loan)	16	(1)
2023–2024	Casertana	36	(6)
2024–	Arezzo	71	(17)
- * Club domestic league appearances and goals as of 30 April 2026

Camillo Tavernelli (born 10 July 1999) is an Italian professional footballer who plays as a forward for Serie B club Arezzo.

== Career ==
Tavernelli was raised in the youth teams of Sansepolcro and started his senior career with the club in Serie D at the age of 16. He spent the next four seasons with the Serie C club Gubbio.

On 12 August 2020, Tavernelli signed for Serie B club Cittadella. He made his Serie B debut for Cittadella on 27 September 2020, in a game against Cremonese. He came off the bench to replace Frank Tsadjout in the 65th minute. Tavernelli made his first start on 20 October, in a game against Pordenone and scored his first goal in a 2–0 home victory.

On 31 August 2022, he joined Novara on loan. On 20 January 2023, Tavernelli moved on a new loan to Triestina, with an option to buy.

On 5 September 2023, he signed for Casertana.

On 27 August 2024, Tavernelli moved to Arezzo on a two-season contract.
