= Domenico Frare =

Italian footballer (born 1996)

Personal information
- Date of birth: 10 May 1996 (age 30)
- Place of birth: Conegliano, Italy
- Height: 1.87 m (6 ft 2 in)
- Position: Defender

Team information
- Current team: Pineto
- Number: 52

Youth career
- –2011: Sacilese
- 2011–2015: Parma

Senior career*
Years	Team	Apps	(Gls)
2015–2017	Tuttocuoio	13	(0)
2017–2018	Pontedera	32	(2)
2018–2025	Cittadella	142	(3)
2024–2025	→ Triestina (loan)	30	(0)
2025–	Pineto	24	(0)
- * Club domestic league appearances and goals as of 30 April 2026

Domenico Frare (born 10 May 1996) is an Italian professional footballer who plays for Serie C Group B club Pineto.

== Club career ==
After representing Parma teams on junior levels, he signed with Serie C club Tuttocuoio for his first professional contract before the 2015–16 season. He made his Serie C debut for Tuttocuoio on 17 January 2016 in a game against Rimini as a starter.

On 1 June 2017 he moved to another Serie C team Pontedera on a three-year contract.

On 4 July 2018 he signed with Serie B club Cittadella for an undisclosed fee.

On 14 August 2024, Frare joined Triestina on loan with a conditional obligation to buy.
