= Daniele Donnarumma =

Italian football player (born 1992)

Personal information
- Date of birth: 12 April 1992 (age 34)
- Place of birth: Gragnano, Italy
- Height: 1.83 m (6 ft 0 in)
- Position: Defender

Team information
- Current team: Catania
- Number: 20

Youth career
- –2011: Napoli

Senior career*
Years	Team	Apps	(Gls)
2011–2015	Napoli	0	(0)
2011	→ Nocerina (loan)	5	(0)
2012	→ Carpi (loan)	1	(0)
2012–2014	→ Como (loan)	29	(1)
2014	→ Barletta (loan)	0	(0)
2014–2015	→ Messina (loan)	29	(0)
2015–2016	Cavese	22	(0)
2016	Lecco	10	(0)
2017	Mantova	17	(1)
2017–2020	Monopoli	85	(3)
2020–2023	Cittadella	73	(1)
2023–2025	Cesena	60	(5)
2025–	Catania	34	(2)
- * Club domestic league appearances and goals as of 1 May 2026

Daniele Donnarumma (born 12 April 1992) is an Italian professional footballer who plays as a defender for Serie C Group C club Catania.

== Club career ==
He made his Serie B debut for Nocerina on 1 November 2011 in a game against Empoli.

On 27 August 2020, after 8 years between Serie C and Serie D, he came back to Serie B by signing for Cittadella.

On 11 July 2023, Donnarumma signed a two-year contract with Cesena.
