= Vincenzo Ciriello =

Italian footballer (born 2002)

Personal information
- Date of birth: 16 August 2002 (age 24)
- Height: 1.85 m (6 ft 1 in)
- Position: Defender

Team information
- Current team: Angri

Youth career
- Casertana

Senior career*
Years	Team	Apps	(Gls)
2018–2021	Casertana	21	(0)
2021–2024	Cittadella	4	(0)
2023–2024	→ Picerno (loan)	0	(0)
2024–	Angri	0	(0)
- * Club domestic league appearances and goals as of 27 April 2024

Vincenzo Ciriello (born 16 August 2002) is an Italian footballer who plays as a defender for Serie D club Angri.

== Career ==
Ciriello was raised in the youth teams of Casertana and made his debut for the senior squad in July 2018 in a Coppa Italia game at the age of 15. He made his Serie C debut on 25 August 2019 against Potenza.

On 10 August 2021, he signed with Serie B club Cittadella. He made his Serie B debut for Cittadella on 23 January 2022 against Vicenza.
