= Simone Branca =

Italian football player

Personal information
- Date of birth: 25 March 1992 (age 34)
- Place of birth: Busto Arsizio, Italy
- Height: 1.79 m (5 ft 10 in)
- Position: Midfielder

Team information
- Current team: Cjarlins Muzane
- Number: 20

Youth career
- –2012: Novara
- 2022: Cittadella

Senior career*
Years	Team	Apps	(Gls)
2012	Novara	0	(0)
2012–2013	→ Südtirol (loan)	29	(1)
2013–2015	Südtirol	50	(4)
2015–2018	Alessandria	76	(4)
2018	Vejle	14	(0)
2018–2025	Cittadella	212	(6)
2025–2026	Milan Futuro	44	(5)
2026–	Cjarlins Muzane	7	(1)
- * Club domestic league appearances and goals as of 18 October 2026

Simone Branca (born 25 March 1992) is an Italian professional footballer who plays as a midfielder for Serie D Group C club Cjarlins Muzane. Besides Italy, he has played in Denmark.

== Club career ==
He is the product of Novara youth teams. He made a couple of bench appearances for Novara's senior squad in 2011–12 Serie A, but did not see any field time.

Before the 2012–13 season he joined Serie C club Südtirol on loan. He made his Serie C debut for Südtirol on 2 September 2012 in a game against AlbinoLeffe as a starter. Before the next season, he dissolved his Novara contract by mutual consent and rejoined Südtirol on a permanent basis.

On 30 June 2015 Branca signed a three-year contract with another Serie C club Alessandria.

On 26 January 2018, he moved to Denmark, signing with Vejle in the second-tier Danish 1st Division. He reunited with the Italian manager Adolfo Sormani, who previously coached Branca at Südtirol. He became the first Italian to play for Vejle. He contributed to Vejle getting promotion back to Danish Superliga.

On 6 July 2018, he returned to Italy, signing with Serie B club Cittadella.

On 3 February 2025, Branca joined Serie C club Milan Futuro, which serves as the newly created reserve team of Serie A club AC Milan.

On 10 July 2026, he signed with Serie D club Cjarlins Muzane, ahead of the 2026–27 season.

== Career statistics ==
As of match played 10 May 2026

Club statistics
Club	Season	League			Cup (Note: Includes Coppa Italia Lega Pro, Coppa Italia Serie C, Coppa Italia, Coppa Italia Serie D)		Continental		Other		Total	
Club	Season	Division	Apps	Goals	Apps	Goals	Apps	Goals	Apps	Goals	Apps	Goals
Novara	2011–12	Serie A	0	0	—				0	0	0	0
Novara	Total		0	0	—				0	0	0	0
Südtirol	2012–13	Lega Pro 1 A	29	1	0	0	—				29	1
Südtirol	2013–14	Lega Pro 1 A	23	2	2	0	—		4 (Note: Appearances in the 2014 Lega Pro Prima promotion play-offs)	0	29	2
Südtirol	2014–15	Lega Pro	27	2	2	0	—				29	2
Südtirol	Total		79	5	4	0	0	0	4	0	87	5
Alessandria	2015–16	Lega Pro	33	3	8	0	—		1 (Note: Appearance in the 2016 Lega Pro promotion play-offs)	0	42	3
Alessandria	2016–17	Lega Pro	27	1	2	0	—		6 (Note: Appearances in the 2017 Lega Pro promotion play-offs)	0	35	1
Alessandria	2017–18	Serie C	16	0	2	0	—				18	0
Alessandria	Total		76	4	12	0	0	0	7	0	95	4
Vejle	2017–18	Danish 1st Division	14	0	0	0	—				14	0
Vejle	Total		14	0	0	0	—				14	0
Cittadella	2018–19	Serie B	34	1	2	0	—		4 (Note: Appearances in the 2019 Serie B promotion play-offs)	0	39	1
Cittadella	2019–20	Serie B	32	0	2	0	—		1 (Note: Appearances in the 2020 Serie B promotion play-offs)	0	35	0
Cittadella	2020–21	Serie B	32	1	1	0	—		4 (Note: Appearances in the 2021 Serie B promotion play-offs)	0	37	1
Cittadella	2021–22	Serie B	29	2	2	0	—		2 (Note: Appearances in the 20222 Serie B promotion play-offs)	0	33	2
Cittadella	2022–23	Serie B	32	0	2	0	—		0	0	34	0
Cittadella	2023–24	Serie B	32	2	2	0	—		0	0	34	2
Cittadella	2024–25	Serie B	21	0	1	0	—		0	0	34	0
Cittadella	Total		212	6	12	0	0	0	11	0	235	6
Milan Futuro	2024–25	Serie C	13	0	—				2 (Note: Appearances in Serie C play-out)	0	15	0
Milan Futuro	2025–26	Serie D	31	5	3	0	—		0	0	34	5
Milan Futuro	Total		44	5	3	0	—		2	0	49	5
Career totals			425	20	31	0	—		17	0	473	20
