= Enrico Baldini =

Italian footballer (born 1996)

Personal information
- Date of birth: 13 November 1996 (age 29)
- Place of birth: Massa, Italy
- Height: 1.78 m (5 ft 10 in)
- Position: Forward

Team information
- Current team: Gubbio
- Number: 92

Youth career
- –2011: Carrarese
- 2011–2012: Spezia
- 2012–2014: Inter Milan

Senior career*
Years	Team	Apps	(Gls)
2014–2017	Inter Milan	0	(0)
2016–2017	→ Pro Vercelli (loan)	6	(0)
2017–2019	Ascoli	36	(1)
2019–2021	Fano	42	(3)
2021–2024	Cittadella	65	(15)
2025	Lumezzane	15	(1)
2025–2026	Bra	29	(7)
2026–	Gubbio	1	(0)

International career
2013	Italy U17	2	(0)
2014	Italy U18	1	(0)
2015	Italy U19	3	(0)
2016	Italy U20	2	(0)
- * Club domestic league appearances and goals as of 22 August 2026

Enrico Baldini (born 13 November 1996) is an Italian footballer who plays as a forward for Serie C Group B club Gubbio.

== Club career ==
=== Inter ===
Baldini began playing with Carrarese's and Spezia's youth systems, before being signed by Inter in 2012.

He made his official debut in European competition for Internazionale on 11 December 2014 during the group stage match of Europa League campaign against Azerbaijani side FK Qarabağ. In 2016 he was loaned to Pro Vercelli. At the end of the 2016–17 season, Baldini returned to Inter. He was part of the squad in the first day of pre-season training, but was transferred to Ascoli on a three-year contract on 26 July.

=== Ascoli ===
Baldini joined Ascoli on 26 July 2017. He was assigned number 29 shirt of the first team.

=== Fano ===
On 14 August 2019, he signed a one-year contract with Serie C club Fano. On 30 September 2020 he returned to Fano on a two-year contract.

=== Cittadella ===
On 18 January 2021, he moved to Serie B club Cittadella. On 17 May, he scored a hat trick in the promotion playoff semi-final first leg to help Cittadella advance to the final round.

On 30 August 2024, his contract with Cittadella was terminated by mutual consent.

== International career ==
He has represented Italy at U-17, U-18, U-19, and U-20 levels.

== Honours ==
=== Club ===
Inter Primavera

- Torneo di Viareggio: 2015
- Coppa Italia Primavera: 2015–16
