= Alessio Vita =

Italian footballer (born 1993)

Personal information
- Date of birth: 16 March 1993 (age 33)
- Place of birth: Rome, Italy
- Height: 1.76 m (5 ft 9 1/2 in)
- Positions: Winger; midfielder

Team information
- Current team: Treviso (on loan from Cittadella)
- Number: 16

Youth career
- –2012: Torino

Senior career*
| Years | Team | Apps | (Gls) |
| 2012–2015 | Monza | 80 | (21) |
| 2015–2017 | Sassuolo | 0 | (0) |
| 2015–2017 | → Vicenza (loan) | 77 | (2) |
| 2017–2018 | Cesena | 31 | (0) |
| 2018–2019 | Feralpisalò | 40 | (4) |
| 2019– | Cittadella | 219 | (17) |
| 2026– | → Treviso (loan) | 0 | (0) |

International career
| 2012–2013 | Italy U20 "C" | 4 | (2) |
- * Club domestic league appearances and goals as of 29 April 2026

Alessio Vita (born 16 March 1993) is an Italian professional footballer who plays for Serie C club Treviso on loan from Cittadella.

== Club career ==
=== Early career ===
A former Torino youth player, he represented the club's Primavera formation from 2010 to 2012. In 2012, he was sold to Monza in co-ownership, making 36 appearances and scoring seven goals in his first season in the professionals. After two excellent seasons played in Biancorosso under his mentor Antonino Asta, his contract was not redeemed by Torino. On 19 January 2015, Monza, suffering from financial difficulties, released Vita for free.

=== Sassuolo and loan to Vicenza ===
On 20 January 2015 Vita was signed by Serie A club Sassuolo on a three-and-a-half-year contract. He was immediately transferred to Serie B club Vicenza in a temporary deal for one and a half seasons.

He selected the number 16 shirt for his new team. Vita made his debut on 24 January, against Trapani. He substituted Stefano Giacomelli in the second half.

In July 2016 the loan was renewed.

=== Cesena ===
On 30 June 2017, the last day of Cesena's financial year, Vita was sold to Cesena, with Alessandro Ahmetaj and Emanuele Grumo moved to Sassuolo.

=== Cittadella ===
On 4 July 2019, he signed with Cittadella.

== International career ==
Vita was a player of Italy Lega Pro representative teams, which he played 3 out of 4 possible matches of 2012–13 Under 20 Regional Competition, including a brace against Slovenia. Vita also played the friendly match against Oman.
