= Luca Maniero (footballer, born 1995) =

Italian footballer

Personal information
- Date of birth: 12 June 1995 (age 31)
- Place of birth: Padua, Italy
- Height: 1.87 m (6 ft 2 in)
- Position: Goalkeeper

Team information
- Current team: Cittadella
- Number: 1

Senior career*
| Years | Team | Apps | (Gls) |
| 2012–2014 | Padova | 0 | (0) |
| 2013 | → Inter Milan (loan) | 0 | (0) |
| 2014–2015 | Pordenone | 7 | (0) |
| 2015–2017 | Crotone | 0 | (0) |
| 2016 | → Mantova (loan) | 3 | (0) |
| 2017–2018 | Palermo | 0 | (0) |
| 2018– | Cittadella | 49 | (0) |
- * Club domestic league appearances and goals as of 29 April 2026

Luca Maniero (born 12 June 1995) is an Italian professional footballer who plays as a goalkeeper for Italian Serie C side Cittadella.
