= Stadio Pier Cesare Tombolato =

Football stadium

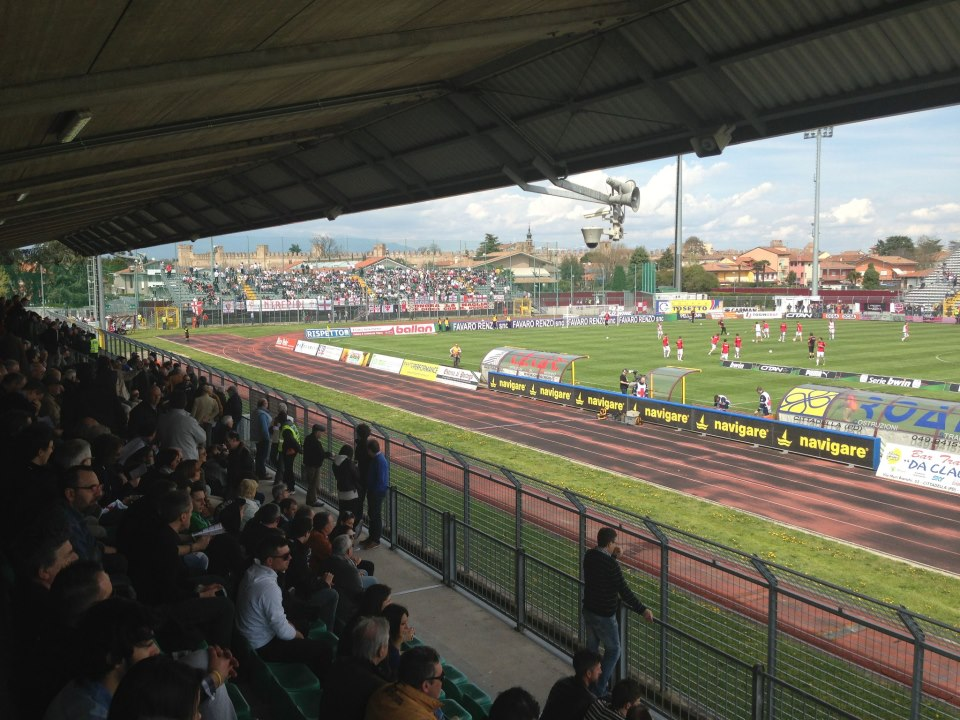
- Interactive map of Stadio Pier Cesare Tombolato
- Location: Cittadella, Italy
- Coordinates: 45°38′34″N 11°46′52″E
- Owner: Municipality of Cittadella
- Capacity: 7,623
- Surface: Grass; 105x68m

Construction
- Opened: 1981
- Renovated: 2008, 2015

Tenant
- A.S. Cittadella

Stadio Pier Cesare Tombolato is a multi-use stadium in Cittadella, Italy. It is currently used mostly for football matches and is the home ground of A.S. Cittadella. The stadium holds 7,623.

== History ==
The stadium was named after Piercesare Tombolato, a goalkeeper of Cittadella who died in hospital after a collision with a rival player in a match against Calcio Padova in 1957.

The stadium's capacity was boosted to 7,500 for the 2008–09 season, in order to enable A.S. Cittadella play in their home town, though it needed a dispensation from the FIGC, that requires a stadium of at least 10,000 seats for Serie B. The first game in the renovated stadium was against A.C. Ancona on October 29, 2008.
