= AS Cittadella =

Italian professional football club

Cittadella
- Full name: Associazione Sportiva Cittadella S.r.l.
- Nicknames: Citta; I Granata (The Maroons)
- Founded: 1973; 53 years ago, (as Associazione Sportiva Cittadella)
- Ground: Stadio Pier Cesare Tombolato
- Capacity: 7,623
- Owner: Gabrielli SA
- Chairman: Andrea Gabrielli
- Head coach: Roberto Musso
- League: Serie C Group A
- 2025–26: Serie C Group A, 6th of 20
- Website: ascittadella.it
| Home colours | Away colours | Third colours |

Associazione Sportiva Cittadella, commonly referred to as Cittadella, is an Italian professional football club based in the city of Cittadella, Veneto, currently playing in Serie C Group A, following relegation in the 2024–25 season.

The team was founded in 1973 and plays its home games at the Stadio Pier Cesare Tombolato, which has a capacity of 7,623 seats.

== History ==
Cittadella was founded in 1973, after the merger of U.S. Cittadellense and A.S. Olympia. The club spent most of its first years in amateur football, and then professional football at Serie C2 and Serie C1 ranks. Cittadella won its first promotion to Serie B in 1999 after defeating Brescello in the playoff finals, and spent a total two seasons in the Italian second-highest ranked division, being then relegated in 2001–02 Serie B. During their first stay in Serie B, the club played in Stadio Euganeo in Padua and, in an attempt to expand the fanbase, was renamed A.S. Cittadella Padova, Padua (Padova in Italian) being the home province of Cittadella.

Cittadella returned to Serie B in 2008, after defeating Cremonese in the 2007–08 Serie C1/A playoffs, under the guide of head coach Claudio Foscarini. In the 2008–09 Serie B season, the club was involved to projects focused to boost the capacity of the Stadio Tombolato to 7,500, in order to let the club play in their home town (with dispensation from the FIGC, since a stadium of at least 10,000 seats is required for Serie B). Thus, Cittadella played the first season games in Stadio Omobono Tenni in Treviso, about 40 km away. After some delays, the first Serie B game played in Cittadella was played on 29 October 2008, Ancona being the opponents. The club escaped relegation in the final days of the season, thus ensuring another year of Serie B football to the local fans.

The following season, Cittadella thrashed Lecce 5–1 and Mantova 6–0 to finish 6th, and only losing to Brescia in the playoffs due to Brescia's superior league placing, despite a late 1–0 win in the second leg.

The club produced two strikers who later left for Serie A teams, namely, Riccardo Meggiorini (50% rights sold for €2.5M), Matteo Ardemagni (sold for €3.75M). Moreover, 2010–11 Serie B topscorer Federico Piovaccari also left for Sampdoria in 2011 for €3.5M, although Samp was relegated shortly afterwards from Serie A in 2010–11.

Cittadella was relegated again to Lega Pro in 2014–15.

The club returned to Serie B for the 2016–17 season following their promotion from the Lega Pro and has since regularly competed for the promotion play-off positions, including finishing as high as 5th place in 2019–20. They reached the promotion play-off final to Serie A in 2018–19 against Hellas Verona and, after winning the first match by 2–0 at home, conceded the comeback to Verona in the 2nd leg, losing 3–0 away after going down to 10 men when the score was still 1–0. Similarly, Cittadella also lost in the play-off final against Venezia at the end of the 2020–21 season to again narrowly miss out on the club's first promotion to Serie A.

== Honours ==
=== League ===
- Lega Pro
  - Winners (1): 2015–16 (group A)
- Campionato Interregionale
  - Winners (1): 1988-89 (group D)
- Campionato Nazionale Dilettanti
  - Winners (1): 1992-93 (group B)
- Prima Categoria
  - Winners (1): 1977-78 (group D)

=== Cups ===
- Coppa Italia Dilettanti
  - Winners (1): 1979–80
- Coppa Italia Lega Pro
  - Runners-up: 2015–16

== Players ==
=== Current squad ===
As of 1 September 2026

Note: Flags indicate national team as defined under FIFA eligibility rules; some limited exceptions apply. Players may hold more than one non-FIFA nationality.

| No. | Pos. | Nation | Player |
|---|---|---|---|
| 2 | GK | ITA | Luca Maniero |
| 4 | DF | ITA | Francesco Toffanin |
| 5 | MF | ITA | Andrea Barberis |
| 7 | FW | ITA | Emanuele Anastasia |
| 8 | MF | ITA | Francesco Amatucci |
| 9 | FW | ITA | Davis Mensah |
| 10 | MF | ITA | Mirko Antonucci |
| 11 | FW | ITA | Diego Falcinelli |
| 14 | DF | ITA | Carlo Crialese |
| 16 | FW | GHA | Joseph Ekuban |
| 18 | FW | UKR | Eduard Ihnatov |
| 19 | DF | ITA | Francesco D'Alessio |
| 20 | MF | ITA | Mattia Sangalli |

| No. | Pos. | Nation | Player |
|---|---|---|---|
| 22 | GK | ITA | Cesare Sommacal |
| 23 | MF | ITA | Lorenzo Paolucci |
| 24 | DF | ITA | Michele Gobbato |
| 25 | DF | ITA | Andrea Cecchetto |
| 33 | MF | ITA | Giulio Frisenna |
| 36 | DF | ITA | Andrea Zilio |
| 43 | DF | ALB | Angelo Ndrecka |
| 55 | DF | ITA | Alex Redolfi |
| 69 | GK | ITA | Alessandro Zanellati |
| 71 | FW | ITA | Andrea Ceccarelli |
| 87 | DF | ITA | Bruno Martella |
| 99 | FW | ITA | Michael Fabbro |

=== Out on loan ===
Note: Flags indicate national team as defined under FIFA eligibility rules; some limited exceptions apply. Players may hold more than one non-FIFA nationality.

| No. | Pos. | Nation | Player |
|---|---|---|---|
| — | MF | ITA | Mattia Gaddini (at Grosseto until 30 June 2027) |
| — | MF | ITA | Andrea Ghezzi (at Vado until 30 June 2027) |

| No. | Pos. | Nation | Player |
|---|---|---|---|
| — | MF | ITA | Alessio Vita (at Treviso until 30 June 2027) |

== Club officials ==
=== Board of directors ===
| Role | Name |
|---|---|
| Owner | (Italy) Gabrielli SA |
| President | (Italy) Andrea Gabrielli |
| Vice-presidents | (Italy) Giancarlo Pavin (Italy) Nicola Maffei |
| General Director | (Italy) Stefano Marchetti |
| Sporting Director | (Italy) Mauro Michelini |
| Head of basic activities | (Italy) Daniele Rizzo |
| Head of Youth Development | (Argentina) Cristian La Grottería |
| Marketing Director | (Italy) Luigi Zanarella |
| Secretaries | (Italy) Alberto Toso (Italy) Stefano Zonta (Italy) Laura Dal Zuffo (Italy) Andrea De Poli (Italy) Luca Torresin (Italy) Daniele Ceccato |
| Communications Department | (Italy) Davide De Marchi |
| Front Office | (Italy) Francesco Russo |
| Pitch Facilities | (Italy) Renzo Sartore (Italy) Mariano Campagnaro |
| Security Director | (Italy) Alessandro Bressa |
| Supporter Liaison Officer | (Italy) Silvio Bizzotto |
| Structure Director | (Italy) Remo Poggiana |
| Team Manager | (Italy) Federico Cerantola |
| Store Department | (Italy) Fabio Lebran |
| Photographer | (Italy) Massimo Felicetti |

- Last updated: 5 May 2023

=== Current technical staff ===
| Role | Name |
|---|---|
| Head coach | (Italy) Alessandro Dal Canto |
| Assistant coaches | (Italy) Nicola Donazzan (Italy) Roberto Musso |
| Fitness coach | (Italy) Andrea Redigolo |
| Goalkeeping coach | (Italy) Andrea Pierobon |
| Head of Medical | (Italy) Ilario Candido |
| Orthopedic | (Italy) Renato Sattin |
| Masseur | (Italy) Giovanni Pivato (Italy) Nicola De Bardi |
| Physiotherapist | (Italy) Polimedica FISIO&SPORT |

- Last updated: 5 May 2023

== Managers ==
- (Italy) Rolando Maran (2002–2005)
- (Italy) Claudio Foscarini (2005–2015)
- (Italy) Roberto Venturato (2015–2021)
- (Italy) Edoardo Gorini (2021–2024)
- (Italy) Alessandro Dal Canto (2024-)
