= 2024–25 Serie B =

Italian football league season

Serie B
- Season: 2024–25
- Dates: Regular season: 16 August 2024 – 13 May 2025; Play-offs: 17 May 2025 – 22 June 2025
- Champions: Sassuolo (2nd title)
- Promoted: Sassuolo; Pisa; Cremonese (via play-off)
- Relegated: Salernitana (via play-out); Brescia (folded); Cittadella; Cosenza
- Matches: 380
- Goals: 937 (2.47 per match)
- Top goalscorer: Armand Laurienté (18 goals); Pio Esposito (17+2 goals)
- Biggest home win: Sassuolo 6–1 Cittadella; Spezia 5–0 Cittadella
- Biggest away win: Südtirol 0–4 Cremonese; Carrarese 0–4 Spezia; Cittadella 1–5 Südtirol
- Highest scoring: Cesena 3–5 Sampdoria; Sassuolo 5–3 Südtirol; Palermo 5–3 Sassuolo
- Longest winning run: 7 matches Sassuolo (12–18)
- Longest unbeaten run: 14 matches Spezia (1–14); Bari (3–16); Sassuolo (5–18)
- Longest winless run: 13 matches Sampdoria (11–23)
- Longest losing run: 5 matches Südtirol (12–16); Carrarese (21–25)
- Highest attendance: 31,370; Sampdoria 1–0 Salernitana
- Lowest attendance: 1,078; Cosenza 0–1 Cesena
- Total attendance: 3,779,927
- Average attendance: 9,715

The 2024–25 Serie B (known as the Serie BKT for sponsorship reasons) was the 93rd season of the Serie B since its establishment in 1929.

The league started on 16 August 2024.

== Teams ==
=== Team changes ===
The following teams changed divisions since the 2023–24 season:

==== To Serie B ====
Relegated from Serie A

- Frosinone
- Sassuolo
- Salernitana

Promoted from Serie C

- Mantova (Group A)
- Cesena (Group B)
- Juve Stabia (Group C)
- Carrarese (Play-off winners)

==== From Serie B ====
Promoted to Serie A

- Parma
- Como
- Venezia

Relegated to Serie C

- Ternana
- Ascoli
- Feralpisalò
- Lecco

New teams for the 2024–25 Serie B started early to appear as Cesena FC earned their spot on 30 March 2024 (the first team to be promoted so early in a season), marking the city's return to the Italian second tier after six years of absence and the first time in club history due to dissolution of the former AC Cesena. A few days later, Mantova and Juve Stabia also returned to second level tier after 14 and 4 years of absence, respectively. And on 9 June 2024, Carrarese defeated Vicenza in Serie C play-off finals, thus earning the final promotion spot and returning to Serie B after 76 years of absence.

On 26 April 2024, Salernitana were relegated to Serie B after three years in Serie A. They were followed by Sassuolo, who were relegated to Serie B on 19 May 2024 after an 11-year stint in the top flight, and Frosinone, who went down on the final game of the season on 26 May 2024 after just a year in the top flight.

Locations of the 2024–25 Serie B teams

=== Number of teams by regions ===
No. of teams	Region	Team(s)
4	Emilia-Romagna	Cesena, Modena, Reggiana and Sassuolo
3	Lombardy	Brescia, Cremonese and Mantova
2	Calabria	Catanzaro and Cosenza
2	Campania	Juve Stabia and Salernitana
2	Liguria	Sampdoria and Spezia
2	Tuscany	Carrarese and Pisa
1	Apulia	Bari
1	Lazio	Frosinone
1	Sicily	Palermo
1	Trentino-Alto Adige/Südtirol	Südtirol
1	Veneto	Cittadella

=== Stadiums and locations ===
Team	Location	Stadium	Capacity	Notes
Bari	Bari	Stadio San Nicola	58,270	17th in Serie B
Brescia	Brescia	Stadio Mario Rigamonti	19,500	8th in Serie B
Carrarese	Carrara	Stadio dei Marmi	3,520	Serie C, play-off winner
Catanzaro	Catanzaro	Stadio Nicola Ceravolo	14,650	5th in Serie B
Cesena	Cesena	Orogel Stadium-Dino Manuzzi	20,194	Serie C, Group B winner
Cittadella	Cittadella	Stadio Pier Cesare Tombolato	7,623	14th in Serie B
Cosenza	Cosenza	Stadio San Vito-Gigi Marulla	20,987	9th in Serie B
Cremonese	Cremona	Stadio Giovanni Zini	15,191	4th in Serie B
Frosinone	Frosinone	Stadio Benito Stirpe	16,227	18th in Serie A
Juve Stabia	Castellammare di Stabia	Stadio Romeo Menti	7,642	Serie C, Group C winner
Mantova	Mantua	Stadio Danilo Martelli	6,066	Serie C, Group A winner
Modena	Modena	Stadio Alberto Braglia	21,151	10th in Serie B
Palermo	Palermo	Stadio Renzo Barbera	36,365	6th in Serie B
Pisa	Pisa	Arena Garibaldi – Stadio Romeo Anconetani	14,000	13th in Serie B
Reggiana	Reggio Emilia	Mapei Stadium – Città del Tricolore	21,525	11th in Serie B
Salernitana	Salerno	Stadio Arechi	20,194	20th in Serie A
Sampdoria	Genoa	Stadio Luigi Ferraris	33,205	7th in Serie B
Sassuolo	Sassuolo	Mapei Stadium – Città del Tricolore	21,515	19th in Serie A
Spezia	La Spezia	Stadio Alberto Picco	11,968	15th in Serie B
Südtirol	Bolzano	Stadio Druso	5,539	12th in Serie B

=== Personnel and kits ===
Team	Manager	Captain	Kit manufacturer	Shirt sponsor(s)	
Team	Manager	Captain	Kit manufacturer	Main	Other(s)
Bari	(Italy) Moreno Longo	(Italy) Francesco Vicari	Erreà	Molino Casillo	List: Front: GoUp Noleggi; Back: MV Line; Sleeves: Supermercati Decò; Shorts: Granoro
Brescia	(Italy) Rolando Maran	(Italy) Dimitri Bisoli	Kappa	Gruppo DAC	List: Front: None; Back: Le Stagioni d'Italia; Sleeves: Pardgroup; Shorts: Eat Pink
Carrarese	(Italy) Nicola Antonio Calabro	(Italy) Marco Imperiale	Givova	Sagevan	List: Front: None; Back: FuturEnergy; Sleeves: Petra 2011; Shorts: Gemignani e Vanelli Marmi
Catanzaro	(Italy) Fabio Caserta	(Italy) Pietro Iemmello	EYE Sport	Coop	List: Front: Cupra Autoionà; Back: Principe Srl; Sleeves: BCC Calabria Ulteriore; Shorts: Fresco Sorriso
Cesena	(Italy) Michele Mignani	(Italy) Giuseppe Prestia	Erreà	E.CO Energia Corrente	List: Front: None; Back: E.CO Energia Corrente; Sleeves: 1 Attimo in Forma; Shorts: FS Costruzioni
Cittadella	(Italy) Alessandro Dal Canto	(Italy) Simone Branca	Erreà	Sirmax	List: Front: Gabrielli SpA; Back: Stylplex (H) / Meta Utensili (A & T); Sleeves: Pastificio Cecchin / Nico Abbigliamento; Shorts: Scilm (H) / INE SpA (A & T)
Cosenza	(Italy) Massimiliano Alvini	(Italy) Tommaso D'Orazio	Nike	Patata della Sila	List: Front: Volkswagen Chiappetta; Back: None; Sleeves: None; Shorts: 3F Group
Cremonese	(Italy) Giovanni Stroppa	(Italy) Matteo Bianchetti	Acerbis	Ilta Inox (H) / Arinox (A & T)	List: Front: Acciaieria Arvedi; Back: Milwaukee Tool; Sleeves: Arvedi Tubi Acciaio; Shorts: Feraboli Lubrificanti
Frosinone	(Italy) Paolo Bianco	(Italy) Ilario Monterisi	Zeus	MeglioBanca	List: Front: 7Sette Carburanti; Back: Supermercati Dem; Sleeves: Zedstore; Shorts: None
Juve Stabia	(Italy) Guido Pagliuca	(Italy) Alberto Gerbo	Givova	Supermercati Decò	List: Front: FRIMM, Oscar Petroli; Back: DS Glass; Sleeves: Bene Assicurazioni; Shorts: Madol Lubrificanti e Oli Motore
Mantova	(Italy) Davide Possanzini	(Italy) Salvatore Burrai	Givova	Sinergy Luce e Gas	List: Front: PATA Snack; Back: Verodol CBD; Sleeves: Napoli Uno; Shorts: Trinità Salumi
Modena	(Italy) Paolo Mandelli	(Italy) Antonio Pergreffi	New Balance	Kerakoll	List: Front: None; Back: SIM Maranello / Microprecisione; Sleeves: Reflexallen; Shorts: Studio Appari
Palermo	(Italy) Alessio Dionisi	(Italy) Matteo Luigi Brunori	Puma	Old Wild West	List: Front: Bisaten; Back: inX.aero; Sleeves: LT Costruzioni; Shorts: A29 Energy Plus
Pisa	(Italy) Filippo Inzaghi	(Italy) Antonio Caracciolo	Adidas	Cetilar	List: Front: Serenis, inX.aero; Back: HTS Verde Sportivo; Sleeves: Gruppo Paim; Shorts: Toni Luigi Scavi e Demolizioni
Reggiana	(Italy) Davide Dionigi	(Italy) Paolo Rozzio	Macron	Immergas	List: Front: Righi Food, EA Group; Back: Fiat Autostile; Sleeves: Carrozzeria 2S; Shorts: Olmedo Special Vehicles
Salernitana	(Italy) Pasquale Marino	(Italy) Luigi Sepe	Zeus	958 Santero	List: Front: Dianflex; Back: e-Campus Università; Sleeves: Volkswagen Autodue; Shorts: None
Sampdoria	(Italy) Alberico Evani	(Poland) Bartosz Bereszyński	Macron	Rendimax	List: Front: None; Back: Idee per Viaggiare; Sleeves: Sogeco International; Shorts: LaMiaLiguria
Sassuolo	(Italy) Fabio Grosso	(Italy) Domenico Berardi	Puma	Mapei	None
Spezia	(Italy) Luca D'Angelo	(Italy) Filippo Bandinelli	Kappa	Spigas Clienti	List: Front: Dani Shipping; Back: LaMiaLiguria; Sleeves: Iozzelli Magazzini Edili; Shorts: None
Südtirol	(Italy) Fabrizio Castori	(Italy) Fabian Tait	Erreà	Südtirol	List: Front: Duka Shower; Back: TopHaus (H) / Racines-Giovo (A); Sleeves: Alperia; Shorts: None

=== Managerial changes ===
Team	Outgoing manager	Manner of departure	Date of vacancy	Position in table	Replaced by	Date of appointment
Cosenza	(Italy) William Viali	Mutual consent	14 June 2024	Pre-season	(Italy) Massimiliano Alvini	1 July 2024
Cesena	(Italy) Domenico Toscano	Mutual consent	18 June 2024	Pre-season	(Italy) Michele Mignani	1 July 2024
Pisa	(Italy) Alberto Aquilani	Mutual consent	18 June 2024	Pre-season	(Italy) Filippo Inzaghi	3 July 2024
Catanzaro	(Italy) Vincenzo Vivarini	Mutual consent	28 June 2024	Pre-season	(Italy) Fabio Caserta	5 July 2024
Palermo	(Italy) Michele Mignani	Sacked	30 June 2024	Pre-season	(Italy) Alessio Dionisi	1 July 2024
Sassuolo	(Italy) Davide Ballardini	End of contract	30 June 2024	Pre-season	(Italy) Fabio Grosso	1 July 2024
Frosinone	(Italy) Eusebio Di Francesco	End of contract	30 June 2024	Pre-season	(Italy) Vincenzo Vivarini	1 July 2024
Reggiana	(Italy) Alessandro Nesta	Signed by Monza	30 June 2024	Pre-season	(Italy) William Viali	1 July 2024
Bari	(Italy) Federico Giampaolo	End of caretaker spell	30 June 2024	Pre-season	(Italy) Moreno Longo	1 July 2024
Salernitana	(Italy) Stefano Colantuono	End of caretaker spell	30 June 2024	Pre-season	(Italy) Andrea Sottil	1 July 2024
Salernitana	(Italy) Andrea Sottil	Mutual consent	2 July 2024	Pre-season	(Italy) Giovanni Martusciello	3 July 2024
Sampdoria	(Italy) Andrea Pirlo	Sacked	29 August 2024	19th	(Italy) Andrea Sottil	30 August 2024
Cremonese	(Italy) Giovanni Stroppa	Sacked	8 October 2024	7th	(Italy) Eugenio Corini	9 October 2024
Cittadella	(Italy) Edoardo Gorini	Sacked	11 October 2024	18th	(Italy) Alessandro Dal Canto	14 October 2024
Frosinone	(Italy) Vincenzo Vivarini	Sacked	22 October 2024	20th	(Italy) Leandro Greco	22 October 2024
Südtirol	(Switzerland) Federico Valente	Sacked	4 November 2024	16th	(Italy) Marco Zaffaroni	4 November 2024
Modena	(Italy) Pierpaolo Bisoli	Sacked	4 November 2024	19th	(Italy) Paolo Mandelli	4 November 2024 (Note: Initially a caretaker, Mandelli was confirmed as manager of the club on 11 November.)
Salernitana	(Italy) Giovanni Martusciello	Sacked	11 November 2024	17th	(Italy) Stefano Colantuono	11 November 2024
Cremonese	(Italy) Eugenio Corini	Sacked	11 November 2024	5th	(Italy) Giovanni Stroppa	11 November 2024
Südtirol	(Italy) Marco Zaffaroni	Sacked	7 December 2024	19th	(Italy) Fabrizio Castori	8 December 2024
Brescia	(Italy) Rolando Maran	Sacked	9 December 2024	10th	(Italy) Pierpaolo Bisoli	9 December 2024
Sampdoria	(Italy) Andrea Sottil	Sacked	9 December 2024	15th	(Italy) Leonardo Semplici	11 December 2024
Salernitana	(Italy) Stefano Colantuono	Mutual consent	30 December 2024	18th	(Italy) Roberto Breda	3 January 2025
Brescia	(Italy) Pierpaolo Bisoli	Sacked	28 January 2025	15th	(Italy) Rolando Maran	28 January 2025
Frosinone	(Italy) Leandro Greco	Sacked	17 February 2025	19th	(Italy) Paolo Bianco	18 February 2025
Cosenza	(Italy) Massimiliano Alvini	Sacked	26 February 2025	20th	(Italy) Pierantonio Tortelli	26 February 2025
Cosenza	(Italy) Pierantonio Tortelli	Sacked	30 March 2025	20th	(Italy) Massimiliano Alvini	30 March 2025
Reggiana	(Italy) William Viali	Sacked	30 March 2025	17th	(Italy) Davide Dionigi	31 March 2025
Salernitana	(Italy) Roberto Breda	Sacked	7 April 2025	19th	(Italy) Pasquale Marino	7 April 2025
Sampdoria	(Italy) Leonardo Semplici	Sacked	7 April 2025	18th	(Italy) Alberico Evani	7 April 2025

== League table ==
Pos	Team	Pld	W	D	L	GF	GA	GD	Pts	Promotion, qualification or relegation
1	Sassuolo (C, P)	38	25	7	6	78	38	+40	82	Promotion to Serie A
2	Pisa (P)	38	23	7	8	64	35	+29	76	Promotion to Serie A
3	Spezia	38	17	15	6	59	33	+26	66	Promotion play-offs semi-finals
4	Cremonese (O, P)	38	16	13	9	62	44	+18	61	Promotion play-offs semi-finals
5	Juve Stabia	38	14	13	11	42	41	+1	55	Promotion play-offs preliminary round
6	Catanzaro	38	11	20	7	51	45	+6	53	Promotion play-offs preliminary round
7	Cesena	38	14	11	13	46	47	−1	53	Promotion play-offs preliminary round
8	Palermo	38	14	10	14	52	43	+9	52	Promotion play-offs preliminary round
9	Bari	38	10	18	10	41	40	+1	48	
10	Südtirol	38	12	10	16	50	57	−7	46	
11	Modena	38	10	15	13	48	50	−2	45	
12	Carrarese	38	11	12	15	39	49	−10	45	
13	Mantova	38	10	14	14	49	58	−9	44	
14	Reggiana	38	11	11	16	42	52	−10	44	
15	Frosinone	38	9	16	13	37	50	−13	43	
16	Salernitana (R)	38	11	9	18	37	47	−10	42	Relegation play-out
17	Sampdoria	38	8	17	13	38	49	−11	41	Relegation play-out
18	Brescia (D, R, E)	38	9	16	13	41	48	−7	39 (Note: Brescia were deducted 4 points due to administrative irregularities.)	Framed and folded
19	Cittadella (R)	38	10	9	19	30	56	−26	39	Relegation to Serie C
20	Cosenza (R)	38	7	13	18	32	56	−24	30 (Note: Cosenza were deducted 4 points due to administrative irregularities.)	Relegation to Serie C

Source: Serie BKT
Rules for classification: 1) Points; 2) Head-to-head points; 3) Head-to-head goal difference; 4) Goal difference; 5) Goals scored; 6) Draw.
(Note: Head-to-head record is used only after all the matches between the teams in question have been played)
(C) Champions; (D) Disqualified; (E) Eliminated; (O) Play-off winners; (P) Promoted; (R) Relegated

=== Positions by round ===
The table lists the positions of teams after each week of matches. In order to preserve chronological evolvements, any postponed matches are not included in the round at which they were originally scheduled but added to the full round that was played immediately afterwards.

Team ╲ Round	1	2	3	4	5	6	7	8	9	10	11	12	13	14	15	16	17	18	19	20	21	22	23	24	25	26	27	28	29	30	31	32	33	34	35	36	37	38
Bari	20	19	20	19	16	9	10	12	11	10	10	10	6	6	6	4	7	7	8	6	7	8	7	6	7	7	7	9	9	8	9	9	8	8	8	8	9	9
Brescia	5	13	15	11	2	6	3	5	6	9	9	7	8	8	8	10	11	13	13	13	13	13	15	11	12	13	12	14	14	17	13	16	14	16	15	16	15	15
Carrarese	15	18	13	17	18	19	20	17	17	15	14	12	16	13	16	11	12	10	11	8	9	11	13	14	16	11	11	12	13	12	11	11	11	11	11	10	13	12
Catanzaro	13	15	18	12	13	16	16	16	16	11	11	11	11	11	11	9	8	8	7	7	6	7	6	5	5	5	4	4	5	5	5	6	6	7	7	6	6	6
Cesena	2	9	3	8	9	10	5	8	13	8	8	4	4	4	5	6	5	6	6	10	10	9	9	10	8	8	8	6	6	7	8	8	9	10	10	9	8	7
Cittadella	16	12	11	6	6	13	17	18	18	18	19	17	19	19	20	20	20	18	16	15	15	15	14	15	11	12	14	11	12	14	15	15	17	19	19	19	19	19
Cosenza	6	10	12	20	17	18	19	20	19	19	18	18	13	14	13	17	17	19	19	20	19	20	20	20	20	20	20	20	20	20	20	20	20	20	20	20	20	20
Cremonese	18	14	14	7	8	4	8	7	4	4	4	5	5	5	4	5	4	5	4	4	4	4	4	4	4	4	5	5	4	4	4	4	4	4	4	4	4	4
Frosinone	7	16	17	16	19	20	18	19	20	20	20	20	20	20	18	18	18	20	17	17	17	18	19	19	19	19	19	18	18	13	12	12	12	12	14	15	16	16
Juve Stabia	1	3	2	2	5	14	7	4	5	6	6	6	9	9	9	7	6	4	5	5	5	6	5	7	6	6	6	7	7	6	6	5	5	5	5	5	5	5
Mantova	8	4	9	5	12	5	9	11	10	13	12	15	10	10	10	13	13	11	12	14	14	10	11	13	15	15	16	17	17	18	16	13	13	14	13	14	14	14
Modena	17	11	10	14	15	8	13	13	15	17	17	19	14	15	14	14	10	9	10	9	11	12	12	9	10	10	10	10	10	10	10	10	10	9	9	12	11	11
Palermo	19	20	16	15	11	12	6	9	7	5	5	8	7	7	7	8	9	12	9	11	8	5	8	8	9	9	9	8	8	9	7	7	7	6	6	7	7	8
Pisa	9	2	6	1	1	1	1	1	1	1	1	1	1	3	2	2	2	3	2	2	2	2	2	2	2	2	2	2	2	2	2	2	2	2	2	2	2	2
Reggiana	10	6	1	4	10	11	11	14	8	12	15	13	15	16	17	12	14	15	14	12	12	14	10	12	13	14	13	13	15	15	17	17	19	18	16	13	12	13
Salernitana	3	8	4	9	14	15	15	10	14	16	16	14	17	18	15	16	16	16	18	18	20	17	18	18	17	18	18	19	19	19	19	19	18	15	18	17	18	17
Sampdoria	11	17	19	18	20	17	14	15	12	7	7	9	12	12	12	15	15	14	15	16	16	16	16	16	14	16	15	15	16	16	18	18	16	17	17	18	17	18
Sassuolo	14	7	7	13	7	3	4	3	3	2	2	2	2	1	1	1	1	1	1	1	1	1	1	1	1	1	1	1	1	1	1	1	1	1	1	1	1	1
Spezia	12	5	8	3	3	2	2	2	2	3	3	3	3	2	3	3	3	2	3	3	3	3	3	3	3	3	3	3	3	3	3	3	3	3	3	3	3	3
Südtirol	4	1	5	10	4	7	12	6	9	14	13	16	18	17	19	19	19	17	20	19	18	19	17	17	18	17	17	16	11	11	14	14	15	13	12	11	10	10

Leader and promotion to Serie A
Promotion to Serie A
Play-off semifinals
Play-off preliminary round
Relegation to Serie C
Play-off

Source: WorldFootball.net

== Results ==
Home \ Away	BAR	BRE	CAR	CAT	CES	CIT	COS	CRE	FRO	JST	MAN	MOD	PAL	PIS	REG	SAL	SAM	SAS	SPE	SUD
Bari	—	2–2	0–0	1–1	1–0	3–2	1–1	1–1	2–1	1–3	2–0	1–2	2–1	1–0	2–2	0–0	1–1	1–1	2–0	0–1
Brescia	1–1	—	0–0	2–3	1–1	0–1	2–3	3–2	4–0	0–0	1–2	3–3	1–0	1–2	2–1	0–0	1–1	2–5	1–1	0–0
Carrarese	2–1	1–2	—	2–2	2–0	3–0	1–0	2–2	0–1	0–0	1–1	2–1	1–0	1–0	0–0	3–2	1–0	0–2	0–4	2–0
Catanzaro	3–3	2–1	3–1	—	4–2	1–0	4–0	1–2	0–0	0–0	2–2	2–2	1–3	0–0	1–1	1–0	2–2	1–1	0–1	3–0
Cesena	1–1	2–0	2–1	2–0	—	0–0	2–1	0–1	1–1	1–2	4–2	2–2	2–1	1–1	1–1	2–0	3–5	0–2	0–0	1–0
Cittadella	3–1	0–1	0–0	0–0	0–2	—	0–0	0–0	1–2	2–2	1–2	0–2	2–1	0–3 (Note: Final result was walkover. The match originally ended 1–1.)	3–1	0–2	0–0	1–2	0–2	1–5
Cosenza	1–0	1–1	1–0	1–1	0–1	0–1	—	1–0	0–1	1–1	2–2	1–1	0–3	0–3	1–0	1–1	2–1	0–1	0–0	0–2
Cremonese	1–1	1–1	1–0	4–0	1–2	2–2	3–1	—	1–0	1–1	4–2	2–2	0–1	1–3	0–2	2–1	1–1	1–1	1–1	3–1
Frosinone	0–3	2–1	0–1	1–1	3–2	1–1	2–2	0–3	—	0–0	2–1	1–1	1–1	0–0	1–1	2–0	2–2	1–2	2–2	0–3
Juve Stabia	3–1	0–0	2–1	2–0	1–0	0–1	3–0	1–2	1–1	—	1–0	2–1	1–3	2–0	1–2	1–0	0–0	2–2	0–3	2–1
Mantova	0–1	1–1	2–1	0–0	3–0	1–0	3–2	1–0	3–1	1–1	—	0–0	0–0	2–3	0–2	1–0	2–2	0–3	2–2	2–0
Modena	2–1	2–2	2–0	2–1	0–1	0–1	1–1	2–2	1–1	3–0	3–1	—	2–2	1–0	2–3	1–1	1–3	1–3	1–1	0–0
Palermo	1–0	1–0	1–1	1–2	0–0	0–1	1–1	2–3	2–0	1–0	2–2	2–0	—	1–2	2–0	0–1	1–1	5–3	2–0	1–2
Pisa	2–0	2–1	2–1	0–0	3–1	0–1	2–2	2–1	1–0	3–1	3–1	1–2	2–0	—	2–1	1–0	3–0	3–1	2–2	3–3
Reggiana	0–0	2–0	2–2	2–2	0–1	2–1	0–1	1–2	2–0	2–1	2–2	0–1	2–1	0–2	—	0–0	2–2	0–2	2–1	1–3
Salernitana	0–2	0–0	4–1	0–0	1–1	2–1	3–1	1–0	1–1	1–2	2–0	1–0	1–2	2–3	2–1	—	3–2	1–2	0–2	2–1
Sampdoria	0–0	0–1	1–1	3–3	1–2	1–0	1–0	0–0	0–3	1–2	1–0	1–0	1–1	0–1	0–1	1–0	—	0–0	0–0	1–0
Sassuolo	1–1	2–0	2–0	0–2	2–1	6–1	2–1	1–4	0–1	2–0	1–0	2–0	2–1	1–0	5–1	4–0	5–1	—	0–0	5–3
Spezia	0–0	0–1	4–2	0–1	2–1	5–0	3–1	2–3	2–1	1–1	1–1	1–0	2–2	3–2	1–0	2–0	2–0	2–1	—	3–0
Südtirol	0–0	1–2	2–2	1–1	1–1	1–2	2–1	0–4	1–1	2–0	2–2	2–1	1–3	1–2	2–0	3–2	2–1	0–1	1–1	—

Source: Serie B (in Italian), Soccerway (in English)
Legend: Blue = home team win; Yellow = draw; Red = away team win.

== Promotion play-offs ==
Rules:

- Preliminary round: the higher-placed team played at home. If teams were tied after regular time, extra time was played. If scores were still level, the higher-placed team advanced;
- Semi-finals: the higher-placed team played at home for the second leg. If teams were tied on aggregate, the higher-placed team advanced;
- Final: the higher-placed team played at home for the second leg. If teams were tied on aggregate, the higher-placed team was promoted to Serie A, unless the teams finished tied on points after the regular season, in which case the winner was decided by extra time and a penalty shoot-out if necessary.

Preliminary round
5	Juve Stabia	1
8	Palermo	0
6	Catanzaro	1
7	Cesena	0

Semi-finals
5	Juve Stabia	2	0	2
4	Cremonese	1	3	4
6	Catanzaro	0	1	1
3	Spezia	2	2	4

Final
4	Cremonese	0	3	3
3	Spezia	0	2	2

=== Preliminary round ===
17 May 2025	Catanzaro	1–0	Cesena	Catanzaro
17:15 CEST (UTC+2)	Iemmello 54'	Report		Stadium: Nicola Ceravolo; Attendance: 10,501; Referee: Juan Luca Sacchi

17 May 2025	Juve Stabia	1–0	Palermo	Castellammare di Stabia
19:30 CEST (UTC+2)	Adorante 67'	Report		Stadium: Romeo Menti; Attendance: 7,114; Referee: Marco Di Bello

=== Semi-finals ===
==== First leg ====
21 May 2025	Juve Stabia	2–1	Cremonese	Castellammare di Stabia
20:30 CEST (UTC+2)	Pierobon 34'; Adorante 58'	Report	Johnsen 77'	Stadium: Romeo Menti; Attendance: 7,172; Referee: Giuseppe Collu

21 May 2025	Catanzaro	0–2	Spezia	Catanzaro
20:30 CEST (UTC+2)		Report	Di Serio 49'; Esposito 61'	Stadium: Nicola Ceravolo; Attendance: 12,256; Referee: Kevin Bonacina

==== Second leg ====
25 May 2025	Cremonese	3–0 (4–2 agg.)	Juve Stabia	Cremona
17:15 CEST (UTC+2)	Castagnetti 28'; Johnsen 60'; Vandeputte 66'	Report		Stadium: Giovanni Zini; Attendance: 11,285; Referee: Gianluca Manganiello

25 May 2025	Spezia	2–1 (4–1 agg.)	Catanzaro	La Spezia
19:30 CEST (UTC+2)	Aurelio 36'; Wiśniewski 61'	Report	Cassandro 31'	Stadium: Alberto Picco; Attendance: 11,599; Referee: Fabio Maresca

=== Final ===
==== First leg ====
29 May 2025	Cremonese	0–0	Spezia	Cremona
20:30 CEST (UTC+2)		Report		Stadium: Giovanni Zini; Attendance: 14,100; Referee: Luca Pairetto

==== Second leg ====
1 June 2025	Spezia	2–3 (2–3 agg.)	Cremonese	La Spezia
20:30 CEST (UTC+2)	F. Esposito 83'; Vignali 85'	Report	De Luca 25', 79'; Collocolo 62'	Stadium: Alberto Picco; Attendance: 12,064; Referee: Andrea Colombo

== Relegation play-out ==
=== Format ===
The relegation play-offs (play-out in Italian) is contested over two legs between the teams finishing 16th and 17th in the regular season. The higher-placed team hosts the second leg.

If the teams are level on aggregate score, the lower-placed team in the regular season standings is relegated to Serie C. However, if the two teams finished tied on points in the regular season, extra time and, if necessary, a penalty shoot-out are used to determine the winner.

=== Overview ===
The relegation play-out was originally scheduled for 19 and 26 May 2025 between Frosinone and Salernitana, who finished in 16th and 17th place respectively. Sampdoria were in 18th place and due to be directly relegated, while Brescia ended up in 15th place, securing their status in Serie B. However, on 18 May 2025, Lega B announced the postponement of the fixtures after the FIGC’s Federal Public Prosecutor’s Office had concluded its investigation into financial irregularities concerning Brescia. As the investigation could lead to a points deduction that would alter the final standings, the league opted to delay the play-out pending the outcome of the disciplinary proceedings.

On 26 May, Lega B decided that the relegation play-offs would likely be scheduled for 15 and 20 June 2025. Brescia were deducted four points for administrative violations on 29 May 2025. The penalty altered the final standings: Brescia dropped into the relegation zone, Frosinone moved up to 15th place and avoided relegation, and the play-out positions became Salernitana (16th) and Sampdoria (17th).

Brescia initially appealed the deduction, but on 9 June 2025 the club announced it would renounce the appeal, effectively accepting the four-point penalty and the resulting relegation to Serie C. With the deduction confirmed and Brescia’s appeal withdrawn, the revised standings were definitive. Lega B subsequently rescheduled the play-out for June, with the second leg confirmed for 22 June 2025.

Team 1	Agg.	Team 2	1st leg	2nd leg
Sampdoria	5–0	Salernitana	2–0	3–0 (w/o)

=== First leg ===
15 June 2025	Sampdoria	2–0	Salernitana	Genoa
20:30 CEST (UTC+2)	Meulensteen 39'; Curto 86'	Report		Stadium: Stadio Luigi Ferraris; Attendance: 30,573; Referee: Gianluca Aureliano

=== Second leg ===
22 June 2025	Salernitana	0–3 (0–5 agg.)	Sampdoria	Salerno
20:30 CEST (UTC+2)		Report	Coda 38'; Sibilli 49'	Stadium: Arechi; Attendance: 22,000; Referee: Daniele Doveri

Sampdoria won 5–0 on aggregate and remained in Serie B, while Salernitana were relegated to Serie C. The second leg in Salerno was suspended in the 74th minute with Sampdoria leading 0–2 due to incidents caused by Salernitana fans. Lega B awarded Sampdoria a 3–0 win for the second leg, giving them a 5–0 aggregate victory.

== Season statistics ==
=== Top goalscorers ===
Rank	Player	Club	Goals
1	(Italy) Pio Esposito^{2}	Spezia	19
2	(France) Armand Laurienté	Sassuolo	18
3	(Italy) Andrea Adorante^{2}	Juve Stabia	17
3	(Italy) Pietro Iemmello^{1}	Catanzaro	17
5	(Italy) Matteo Tramoni	Pisa	13
6	(Albania) Cristian Shpendi	Cesena	11
7	(Italy) Manuel De Luca^{2}	Cremonese	10
7	(Italy) Leonardo Mancuso	Mantova	10
7	(Italy) Nicholas Pierini	Sassuolo	10
10	(Italy) Matteo Brunori	Palermo	9
10	(Finland) Joel Pohjanpalo	Palermo	9
10	(Italy) Massimo Coda^{1}	Sampdoria	9
10	(Italy) Samuele Mulattieri	Sassuolo	9
10	(Italy) Antonio Palumbo	Modena	9
10	(Argentina) Franco Vázquez	Cremonese	9

Note

^{1} Player scored 1 goal in the play-offs.
^{2} Player scored 2 goals in the play-offs.

=== Hat-tricks ===
Player	Club	Against	Result	Date
(Italy) Pietro Iemmello	Catanzaro	Sampdoria	3–3 (A)	30 November 2024
(Finland) Joel Pohjanpalo	Palermo	Sassuolo	5–3 (H)	6 April 2025

Note

(H) – Home (A) – Away

=== Clean sheets ===
Rank	Player	Club	Clean sheets	Game weeks
1	(Italy) Stefano Gori^{2}	Spezia	14	7–10, 12–14, 16–18, 32, 36
1	(Italy) Mirko Pigliacelli^{1}	Catanzaro	14	2, 5, 7, 10–12, 20, 22, 26–27, 30, 34, 38
3	(Serbia) Boris Radunović	Bari	13	4–6, 10–11, 13, 16, 20–21, 27, 30, 34, 37
3	(Senegal) Demba Thiam^{1}	Juve Stabia	13	2–4, 7, 12, 14, 18, 26, 32, 34, 36–37
5	(Italy) Marco Bleve	Carrarese	12	3, 7–8, 10–12, 14, 16–18, 20, 35
5	(Croatia) Adrian Šemper	Pisa	12	2–3, 10–11, 13, 17, 20, 22–23, 31, 33, 36
7	(Romania) Horațiu Moldovan	Sassuolo	11	5–7, 10, 14–15, 24–28
8	(Italy) Andrea Fulignati^{2}	Cremonese	10	2, 14–15, 17, 19, 21, 29, 36
8	(Italy) Luca Lezzerini	Brescia	10	1, 5, 12, 14, 17–18, 27, 31, 36–37
10	(Albania) Elhan Kastrati	Cittadella	9	2, 9, 11–12, 17, 21, 23, 28, 32

Note

^{1} Player kept 1 clean-sheet in the play-offs.
^{1} Player kept 2 clean-sheets in the play-offs.

== Awards ==
=== Monthly ===
Month	MVP of the Month		Ref
August	(Italy) Antonio Vergara	Reggiana	
September	(Italy) Salvatore Esposito	Spezia	
October	(Italy) Nicholas Pierini	Sassuolo	
November	(Italy) Pietro Iemmello	Catanzaro	
December	(France) Mattéo Tramoni	Pisa	
January	(Italy) Federico Bonini	Catanzaro	
February	(France) Armand Laurienté	Sassuolo	
March	(France) Farès Ghedjemis	Frosinone	
April	(Finland) Joel Pohjanpalo	Palermo	

=== Annual ===
Award	Winner	Club	Ref
MVP of the season	(France) Armand Laurienté	Sassuolo	
Play-offs MVP	(Italy) Manuel De Luca	Cremonese	

== Attendances ==
#	Club	Average attendance
1	Sampdoria	22,077
2	Palermo	20,730
3	Bari	15,892
4	Salernitana	13,265
5	Cesena	11,803
6	Frosinone	10,408
7	Reggiana	9,826
8	Modena	9,739
9	Catanzaro	9,455
10	Cremonese	8,963
11	Pisa	8,858
12	Spezia	8,846
13	Mantova	8,730
14	Brescia	6,328
15	Sassuolo	5,569
16	Cosenza	5,179
17	Juve Stabia	4,647
18	Südtirol	3,921
19	Cittadella	3,859
20	Carrarese	3,566
