= 2023–24 Serie B =

Italian football league season

Serie B
- Season: 2023–24
- Dates: Regular season: 18 August 2023 – 10 May 2024; Play-offs: 17 May 2024 – 2 June 2024
- Champions: Parma (1st title)
- Promoted: Parma; Como; Venezia (via play-off)
- Relegated: Ternana (via play-out); Ascoli; Feralpisalò; Lecco
- Matches: 380
- Goals: 958 (2.52 per match)
- Top goalscorer: Joel Pohjanpalo (22 goals)
- Biggest home win: Cremonese 4–0 Modena; Como 4–0 Spezia; Feralpisalò 5–1 Lecco; Parma 4–0 Lecco
- Biggest away win: Catanzaro 0–5 Parma
- Highest scoring: Catanzaro 5–3 Lecco; Venezia 5–3 Sampdoria
- Longest winning run: 5 matches Cittadella (12–16); Como (30–34); Venezia (11–15)
- Longest unbeaten run: 10 matches Cremonese (20–29)
- Longest winless run: 13 matches Lecco (20–32)
- Longest losing run: 8 matches Cittadella (21–28)
- Highest attendance: 33,808; Bari 1–1 Ternana (Play-out)
- Lowest attendance: 557; Feralpisalò 0–2 Südtirol
- Total attendance: 3,584,786
- Average attendance: 9,434

The 2023–24 Serie B (known as the Serie BKT for sponsorship reasons) was the 92nd season of the Serie B since its establishment in 1929.

== Changes ==
The following teams changed divisions since the 2022–23 season:

=== To Serie B ===
Relegated from Serie A

- Spezia
- Cremonese
- Sampdoria

Promoted from Serie C

- Feralpisalò (Group A)
- Reggiana (Group B)
- Catanzaro (Group C)
- Lecco (Play-off winners)

=== From Serie B ===
Promoted to Serie A

- Frosinone
- Genoa
- Cagliari

Relegated to Serie C

- Benevento
- Perugia
- SPAL
- Reggina (excluded)

Feralpisalò played in Serie B for the first time in history this season, the 125th team entering this round robin league.

After 50 years of absence, Lecco returned to Serie B for the first time since 1973, Catanzaro returned to Serie B after a 17-year spell in lower divisions and Reggiana returned to Serie B after a 2-year spell in Serie C.

On 1 July 2023, the Co.Vi.So.C. rejected the applications of Lecco (due to the documentation involving their home venue of Padua for the season being presented late) and Reggina (due to financial irregularities). On appeal, the Federal Council readmitted Lecco, but confirmed Reggina's exclusion. The following level of appeal, the Collegio di Garanzia of the Italian Olympic Committee, withheld Reggina's exclusion while also ruling in favour of Perugia's demand to overrule FIGC's decision to accept Lecco.

On 3 August, the Administrative Court of Rome again reversed Lecco's exclusion, readmitting the Lombardian club into the Serie B league, while rejecting Reggina's request for readmission. Those decisions were appealed at the Council of State later on 29 August. In case of any vacancies, Brescia and Perugia (in that order) were expected to be readmitted to the league.

On 30 August, the Council of State rejected the demands of Perugia and Reggina and ruled in favour of Lecco and Brescia, consequently the two teams were allowed to take part in the league.

== Teams ==
=== Stadiums and locations ===
Location of teams in 2023–24 Serie B

Team	Home city	Stadium	Capacity	2022–23 season
Ascoli	Ascoli Piceno	Stadio Cino e Lillo Del Duca	11,326	12th in Serie B
Bari	Bari	Stadio San Nicola	58,270	3rd in Serie B
Brescia	Brescia	Stadio Mario Rigamonti	19,500	16th in Serie B
Catanzaro	Catanzaro	Stadio Nicola Ceravolo	14,650	Serie C Group C champions
Cittadella	Cittadella	Stadio Pier Cesare Tombolato	7,623	15th in Serie B
Como	Como	Stadio Giuseppe Sinigaglia	13,602	13th in Serie B
Cosenza	Cosenza	Stadio San Vito-Gigi Marulla	20,987	17th in Serie B
Cremonese	Cremona	Stadio Giovanni Zini	15,191	19th in Serie A
Feralpisalò	Salò and Lonato del Garda	Stadio Leonardo Garilli (Note: Feralpisalò temporarily relocated to Stadio Leonardo Garilli (home stadium of Piacenza) after Stadio Lino Turina did not meet Serie B requirements.)	21,668	Serie C Group A champions
Lecco	Lecco	Stadio Rigamonti-Ceppi; Stadio Euganeo (Note: Lecco played in Stadio Euganeo (home stadium of Padova) the first home game of the season because Stadio Rigamonti-Ceppi initially did not meet Serie B requirements.)	4,995; 18,060	Serie C play-off winners
Modena	Modena	Stadio Alberto Braglia	21,151	10th in Serie B
Palermo	Palermo	Stadio Renzo Barbera	36,365	9th in Serie B
Parma	Parma	Stadio Ennio Tardini	22,352	4th in Serie B
Pisa	Pisa	Arena Garibaldi – Stadio Romeo Anconetani	14,000	11th in Serie B
Reggiana	Reggio Emilia	Mapei Stadium – Città del Tricolore	21,525	Serie C Group B champions
Sampdoria	Genoa	Stadio Luigi Ferraris	33,205	20th in Serie A
Spezia	La Spezia	Stadio Alberto Picco	11,968	18th in Serie A
Südtirol	Bolzano	Stadio Druso	5,539	6th in Serie B
Ternana	Terni	Stadio Libero Liberati	22,000	14th in Serie B
Venezia	Venice	Stadio Pier Luigi Penzo	11,150	8th in Serie B

=== Number of teams by regions ===
No. of teams	Region	Team(s)
5	Lombardy	Brescia, Como, Cremonese, Feralpisalò and Lecco
3	Emilia-Romagna	Modena, Parma and Reggiana
2	Calabria	Catanzaro and Cosenza
2	Liguria	Sampdoria and Spezia
2	Veneto	Cittadella and Venezia
1	Apulia	Bari
1	Marche	Ascoli
1	Sicily	Palermo
1	Trentino-Alto Adige/Südtirol	Südtirol
1	Tuscany	Pisa
1	Umbria	Ternana

=== Personnel and kits ===
Team	Chairman	Manager	Captain	Kit maker	Shirt sponsor(s)	
Team	Chairman	Manager	Captain	Kit maker	Main	Other(s)
Ascoli	(Italy) Carlo Neri	(Italy) Massimo Carrera	(Brazil) Eric Botteghin	Nike	Fainplast	List: Front: Bricofer; Back: Bricofer / Impresa Generale Costruzioni / Edilizia Casciaroli / ATTAL Group; Sleeves: Impresa Turzo (Home) & Edil Style (Away); Shorts: Gruppo Boero
Bari	(Italy) Luigi De Laurentiis	(Italy) Federico Giampaolo (caretaker)	(Italy) Valerio Di Cesare	Kappa	Molino Casillo	List: Front: None; Back: MV Line; Sleeves: Decò Supermercati; Shorts: Granoro
Brescia	(Italy) Massimo Cellino	(Italy) Rolando Maran	(Italy) Dimitri Bisoli	Kappa	Gruppo DAC	List: Front: None; Back: Le Stagioni d'Italia; Sleeves: Pardgroup; Shorts: Eat Pink
Catanzaro	(Italy) Floriano Noto	(Italy) Vincenzo Vivarini	(Italy) Pietro Iemmello	EYE Sport	Coop	List: Front: Volkswagen Bencivenni; Back: Principe Srl; Sleeves: Main Solution Srl; Shorts: Coop
Cittadella	(Italy) Andrea Gabrielli	(Italy) Edoardo Gorini	(Italy) Simone Branca	Erreà	Sirmax	List: Front: Gruppo Gabrielli; Back: Stylplex (Home), Quartzforms (Away) & Marmo Arredo (Third); Sleeves: Pastificio Cecchin; Shorts: Scilm (Home) & Stylplex (Away & Third)
Como	(England) Dennis Wise	(Wales) Osian Roberts (caretaker)	(Italy) Alessandro Bellemo	Erreà	Mola (Home & Away) & Quelli che... con Luca (Third)	List: Front: None; Back: Acqua S.Bernardo; Sleeves: None; Shorts: None
Cosenza	(Italy) Eugenio Guarascio	(Italy) William Viali	(Italy) Alessandro Micai	Nike	Patata della Sila	List: Front: Volkswagen Chiappetta; Back: Peperoncino Malizia; Sleeves: None; Shorts: 3F Falvo Group
Cremonese	(Italy) Paolo Rossi	(Italy) Giovanni Stroppa	(Italy) Matteo Bianchetti	Acerbis	Ilta Inox (Home) & Arinox (Away & Third)	List: Front: Arvedi; Back: Gruppo Mauro Saviola; Sleeves: Arvedi Tubo Acciaio; Shorts: None
Feralpisalò	(Italy) Giuseppe Pasini	(Italy) Marco Zaffaroni	(Italy) Davide Balestrero	WeArlequin	Feralpi Siderurgica	List: Front: VI.BI. Elettrorecuperi (Home & Away) & Feralpi Presider (in cup matches); Back: Sae Flex (Home), Olimpia Splendid (Away & Third) & Recuperi Metalfer (in cup matches); Sleeves: Appia Antica (Home), Comelli Rottami Metallici (Away) & Caleotto (Third); Shorts: Gabogas (Home), Trailer SpA (Away) & Imbal Carton (Third)
Lecco	(Italy) Cristian Di Nunno	(Italy) Andrea Malgrati (caretaker)	(Croatia) Vedran Celjak	Legea	Cantine Pirovano	List: Front: Casa Coller; Back: Galperti; Sleeves: Terre Bentivoglio; Shorts: Fiocchi
Modena	(Italy) Carlo Rivetti	(Italy) Pierpaolo Bisoli	(Italy) Antonio Pergreffi	New Balance	Kerakoll	List: Front: None; Back: SAU Group; Sleeves: Reflexallen; Shorts: Studio Appari
Palermo	(Italy) Dario Mirri	(Italy) Michele Mignani	(Italy) Matteo Brunori	Puma	Old Wild West	List: Front: Bisaten; Back: A29 Energy Service Company; Sleeves: L.T. Costruzioni; Shorts: Nuova Sicilauto
Parma	(United States) Kyle J. Krause	(Italy) Fabio Pecchia	(Italy) Enrico Del Prato	Puma	Prometeon	List: Front: Classic Football Shirts; Back: inX.aero; Sleeves: None; Shorts: CAD Euro Pool
Pisa	(Italy) Giuseppe Corrado	(Italy) Alberto Aquilani	(Romania) Marius Marin	Adidas	Cetilar	List: Front: SEAC-ESCO; Back: Hi-turf Solution; Sleeves: Gruppo Paim; Shorts: Toni Luigi Scavi e Demolizioni
Reggiana	(Italy) Carmelo Salerno	(Italy) Alessandro Nesta	(Italy) Paolo Rozzio	Macron	Immergas	List: Front: Righi Food; Back: FIAT Autostile; Sleeves: CAI Consulenze Aste Immobiliari; Shorts: Fortlan-Dibi
Sampdoria	(Italy) Marco Lanna	(Italy) Andrea Pirlo	(Italy) Fabio Depaoli	Macron	Banca Ifis / Rendimax	List: Front: None; Back: LaMiaLiguria; Sleeves: None; Shorts: None
Spezia	(United States) Philip Raymond Platek Jr.	(Italy) Luca D'Angelo	(Greece) Dimitris Nikolaou	Kappa	Spigas Clienti	List: Front: None; Back: LaMiaLiguria; Sleeves: Iozzelli Magazzini Edili; Shorts: None
Südtirol	(Italy) Gerhard Comper	(Switzerland) Federico Valente	(Italy) Fabian Tait	Mizuno	Südtirol	List: Front: Duka; Back: TopHaus; Sleeves: Alperia; Shorts: Ci Gusta
Ternana	(Italy) Nicola Guida	(Italy) Roberto Breda	(Italy) Marco Capuano	Macron	Pharmaguida	List: Front: Lenergia; Back: Telematica Italia; Sleeves: Orsolini Amedeo; Shorts: Autoservizi Troiani
Venezia	(United States) Duncan L. Niederauer	(Italy) Paolo Vanoli	(Italy) Marco Modolo	Kappa	Bechèr	List: Front: None; Back: Gruppo Geromin; Sleeves: CharityStars; Shorts: inX.aero

=== Managerial changes ===
Team	Outgoing manager	Manner of departure	Date of vacancy	Position in table	Replaced by	Date of appointment
Modena	(Italy) Attilio Tesser	Sacked	23 May 2023	Pre-season	(Italy) Paolo Bianco	1 July 2023
Pisa	(Italy) Luca D'Angelo	Sacked	2 June 2023	Pre-season	(Italy) Alberto Aquilani	1 July 2023
Ternana	(Italy) Cristiano Lucarelli	Sacked	21 June 2023	Pre-season	(Italy) Aurelio Andreazzoli	1 July 2023
Reggiana	(Italy) Aimo Diana	End of contract	30 June 2023	Pre-season	(Italy) Alessandro Nesta	1 July 2023
Sampdoria	(Serbia) Dejan Stanković	End of contract	30 June 2023	Pre-season	(Italy) Andrea Pirlo	1 July 2023
Ascoli	(Italy) Roberto Breda	End of contract	30 June 2023	Pre-season	(Italy) William Viali	1 July 2023
Cosenza	(Italy) William Viali	Signed by Ascoli	30 June 2023	Pre-season	(Italy) Fabio Caserta	1 July 2023
Spezia	(Italy) Leonardo Semplici	End of contract	30 June 2023	Pre-season	(Italy) Massimiliano Alvini	6 July 2023
Ternana	(Italy) Aurelio Andreazzoli	Mutual consent	11 July 2023	Pre-season	(Italy) Cristiano Lucarelli	14 July 2023
Cremonese	(Italy) Davide Ballardini	Sacked	18 September 2023	9th	(Italy) Giovanni Stroppa	19 September 2023
Bari	(Italy) Michele Mignani	Sacked	9 October 2023	12th	(Italy) Pasquale Marino	10 October 2023
Lecco	(Italy) Luciano Foschi	Sacked	9 October 2023	20th	(Italy) Emiliano Bonazzoli	12 October 2023
Feralpisalò	(Italy) Stefano Vecchi	Sacked	23 October 2023	19th	(Italy) Marco Zaffaroni	23 October 2023
Ternana	(Italy) Cristiano Lucarelli	Sacked	6 November 2023	19th	(Italy) Roberto Breda	6 November 2023
Brescia	(Italy) Daniele Gastaldello	Sacked	10 November 2023	13th	(Italy) Luca Belingheri (caretaker)	10 November 2023
Como	(Italy) Moreno Longo	Sacked	13 November 2023	7th	(Spain) Cesc Fàbregas (caretaker)	13 November 2023
Ascoli	(Italy) William Viali	Sacked	13 November 2023	16th	(Italy) Fabrizio Castori	13 November 2023
Brescia	(Italy) Luca Belingheri	End of caretaker spell	14 November 2023	15th	(Italy) Rolando Maran	14 November 2023
Spezia	(Italy) Massimiliano Alvini	Sacked	15 November 2023	18th	(Italy) Luca D'Angelo	15 November 2023
Südtirol	(Italy) Pierpaolo Bisoli	Sacked	4 December 2023	13th	(Switzerland) Federico Valente	4 December 2023
Como	(Spain) Cesc Fàbregas	End of caretaker spell	23 December 2023	3rd	(Wales) Osian Roberts (caretaker)	24 December 2023
Bari	(Italy) Pasquale Marino	Sacked	5 February 2024	13th	(Italy) Giuseppe Iachini	6 February 2024
Lecco	(Italy) Emiliano Bonazzoli	Sacked	12 February 2024	20th	(Italy) Alfredo Aglietti	12 February 2024
Cosenza	(Italy) Fabio Caserta	Sacked	11 March 2024	14th	(Italy) William Viali	11 March 2024
Ascoli	(Italy) Fabrizio Castori	Sacked	12 March 2024	18th	(Italy) Massimo Carrera	12 March 2024
Lecco	(Italy) Alfredo Aglietti	Sacked	3 April 2024	20th	(Italy) Andrea Malgrati (caretaker)	3 April 2024
Palermo	(Italy) Eugenio Corini	Sacked	3 April 2024	6th	(Italy) Michele Mignani	3 April 2024
Modena	(Italy) Paolo Bianco	Sacked	13 April 2024	13th	(Italy) Pierpaolo Bisoli	14 April 2024
Bari	(Italy) Giuseppe Iachini	Sacked	15 April 2024	16th	(Italy) Federico Giampaolo (caretaker)	15 April 2024

== League table ==
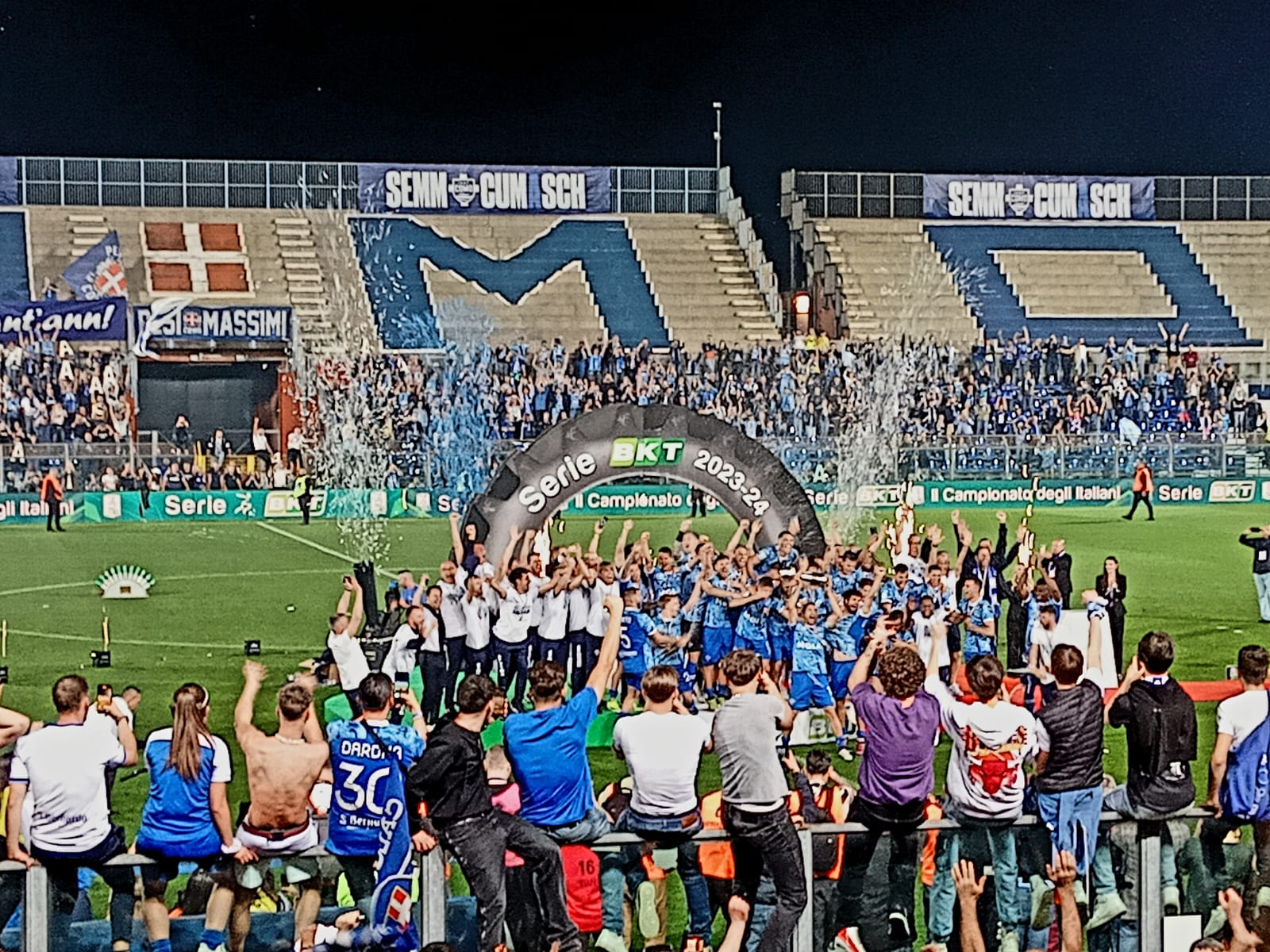
Como 1907 celebrating Serie A promotion

Pos	Team	Pld	W	D	L	GF	GA	GD	Pts	Promotion, qualification or relegation
1	Parma (C, P)	38	21	13	4	66	35	+31	76	Promotion to Serie A
2	Como (P)	38	21	10	7	58	40	+18	73	Promotion to Serie A
3	Venezia (O, P)	38	21	7	10	69	46	+23	70	Qualification for promotion play-offs semi-finals
4	Cremonese	38	19	10	9	50	32	+18	67	Qualification for promotion play-offs semi-finals
5	Catanzaro	38	17	9	12	59	50	+9	60	Qualification for promotion play-offs preliminary round
6	Palermo	38	15	11	12	62	53	+9	56	Qualification for promotion play-offs preliminary round
7	Sampdoria (Note: Sampdoria were deducted 2 points due to failure in paying taxes between January and March 2023.)	38	16	9	13	53	50	+3	55	Qualification for promotion play-offs preliminary round
8	Brescia	38	12	15	11	44	40	+4	51	Qualification for promotion play-offs preliminary round
9	Cosenza	38	11	14	13	47	42	+5	47 (Note: Head-to-head points: Cosenza 11, Modena 11, Reggiana 7, Südtirol 3. Head-to-head goal difference: Cosenza +6, Modena +2.)	
10	Modena	38	10	17	11	41	47	−6	47	
11	Reggiana	38	10	17	11	38	45	−7	47	
12	Südtirol	38	12	11	15	46	48	−2	47	
13	Pisa	38	11	13	14	51	54	−3	46 (Note: Pisa finished ahead of Cittadella on head-to-head points: Pisa 2–1 Cittadella, Cittadella 0–1 Pisa.)	
14	Cittadella	38	11	13	14	40	47	−7	46	
15	Spezia	38	9	17	12	36	49	−13	44	
16	Ternana (R)	38	11	10	17	43	50	−7	43	Qualification for relegation play-out
17	Bari	38	8	17	13	38	49	−11	41 (Note: Bari finished ahead of Ascoli on head-to-head points: Bari 1–0 Ascoli, Ascoli 2–2 Bari.)	Qualification for relegation play-out
18	Ascoli (R)	38	9	14	15	38	42	−4	41	Relegation to Serie C
19	Feralpisalò (R)	38	8	9	21	44	65	−21	33	Relegation to Serie C
20	Lecco (R)	38	6	8	24	35	74	−39	26	Relegation to Serie C

Source: Soccerway (in English)
Rules for classification: 1) Points; 2) Head-to-head points; 3) Head-to-head goal difference; 4) Goal difference; 5) Goals scored; 6) Draw.
(Note: Head-to-head record is used only after all the matches between the teams in question have been played)
(C) Champions; (O) Play-off winners; (P) Promoted; (R) Relegated

=== Positions by round ===
The table lists the positions of teams after each week of matches. In order to preserve chronological evolvements, any postponed matches are not included in the round at which they were originally scheduled but added to the full round that was played immediately afterwards.

Team ╲ Round	1	2	3	4	5	6	7	8	9	10	11	12	13	14	15	16	17	18	19	20	21	22	23	24	25	26	27	28	29	30	31	32	33	34	35	36	37	38
Ascoli	19	19	12	14	15	15	14	14	14	12	14	15	16	16	17	18	17	18	18	17	18	16	16	17	18	17	17	17	18	17	18	18	18	18	16	17	18	18
Bari	8	6	5	7	9	9	12	12	12	14	10	8	10	10	10	9	11	11	11	10	10	12	15	12	10	10	11	13	15	15	14	15	17	17	18	16	17	17
Brescia	12	16	17	12	10	11	10	11	10	7	12	13	15	15	11	12	9	9	9	8	8	9	8	9	9	9	9	7	7	8	8	7	7	7	7	8	8	8
Catanzaro	9	5	3	1	5	4	6	4	4	2	3	4	6	5	4	4	4	6	7	6	7	7	7	6	6	6	6	5	6	5	5	5	5	5	5	5	5	5
Cittadella	4	9	10	9	7	10	9	7	8	11	13	11	9	8	7	6	6	4	4	4	5	5	6	7	7	7	8	9	10	10	11	9	10	10	10	13	11	14
Como	20	15	16	11	8	6	3	5	6	6	6	7	7	6	3	3	3	5	3	3	2	4	3	3	5	5	4	3	4	4	2	2	2	2	2	2	2	2
Cosenza	1	2	6	10	12	8	11	8	5	5	9	10	8	9	9	11	13	12	14	15	14	11	11	13	11	11	10	14	14	14	15	14	15	14	14	12	10	9
Cremonese	10	14	9	8	11	12	8	10	7	9	8	6	4	3	5	5	5	3	5	5	3	2	2	2	2	3	3	2	2	3	4	3	4	4	4	4	4	4
Feralpisalò	18	20	20	20	19	20	16	18	18	19	20	20	20	20	20	20	20	20	20	20	19	18	18	19	19	19	19	19	19	19	19	19	19	19	19	19	19	19
Lecco	13	17	18	19	20	18	20	20	20	20	18	17	17	17	16	16	19	17	16	16	17	20	20	20	20	20	20	20	20	20	20	20	20	20	20	20	20	20
Modena	14	8	4	3	4	3	4	6	9	10	5	3	5	7	6	7	8	8	8	9	9	8	9	8	8	8	7	8	12	13	13	13	13	12	12	14	14	10
Palermo	11	11	8	5	3	5	2	2	2	3	4	5	3	4	8	8	7	7	6	7	6	6	5	5	3	4	5	6	5	6	6	6	6	6	6	6	6	6
Parma	3	1	1	2	1	1	1	1	1	1	1	1	1	1	1	1	1	1	1	1	1	1	1	1	1	1	1	1	1	1	1	1	1	1	1	1	1	1
Pisa	15	7	11	13	13	13	13	13	13	13	15	14	12	11	12	13	14	13	13	13	11	13	13	10	12	15	14	11	8	11	9	10	9	9	9	11	12	13
Reggiana	17	12	14	16	14	14	15	15	15	15	11	12	13	14	15	15	16	15	12	11	12	10	10	11	13	13	12	15	11	12	10	11	12	13	13	9	13	11
Sampdoria	5	13	13	15	16	16	17	19	19	16	17	16	14	13	14	10	10	10	10	14	15	14	14	15	15	14	15	12	9	7	7	8	8	8	8	7	7	7
Spezia	6	10	15	18	17	19	18	17	17	17	16	18	18	18	19	19	18	19	19	19	20	19	19	18	17	18	18	18	16	18	16	16	16	16	15	15	15	15
Südtirol	7	4	7	6	6	7	7	9	11	8	7	9	11	12	13	14	12	14	15	12	13	15	12	14	14	12	13	10	13	9	12	12	11	11	11	10	9	12
Ternana	16	18	19	17	18	17	19	16	16	18	19	19	19	19	18	17	15	16	17	18	16	17	17	16	16	16	16	16	17	16	17	17	14	15	17	18	16	16
Venezia	2	3	2	4	2	2	5	3	3	4	2	2	2	2	2	2	2	2	2	2	4	3	4	4	4	2	2	4	3	2	3	4	3	3	3	3	3	3

Leader and promotion to Serie A
Promotion to Serie A
Play-off semifinals
Play-off preliminary round
Play-out
Relegation to Serie C

Source: WorldFootball.net

== Results ==
Home \ Away	ASC	BAR	BRE	CAT	CIT	COM	COS	CRE	FER	LEC	MOD	PAL	PAR	PIS	REG	SAM	SPE	SUD	TER	VEN
Ascoli	—	2–2	1–1	1–0	0–0	0–1	0–1	0–0	3–0	4–1	0–0	0–1	1–3	2–1	0–0	1–1	1–2	1–2	2–0	0–0
Bari	1–0	—	2–0	2–2	1–1	1–1	0–0	1–2	1–0	3–1	1–1	0–0	1–1	1–1	0–2	0–1	1–1	2–1	3–1	0–3
Brescia	1–1	1–2	—	1–1	2–0	2–0	1–0	0–3	1–1	4–1	0–1	4–2	0–2	3–1	0–0	3–1	0–0	1–1	0–0	0–0
Catanzaro	3–2	2–0	2–3	—	1–1	1–2	2–0	0–0	3–0	5–3	1–2	1–1	0–5	2–0	0–1	1–3	3–0	2–2	2–1	3–2
Cittadella	0–0	1–1	3–2	1–2	—	0–3	2–0	1–2	1–1	2–1	1–1	2–0	1–2	0–1	1–0	1–2	4–1	2–1	2–2	0–0
Como	0–2	2–1	1–0	1–0	2–1	—	1–1	1–3	2–1	0–0	2–1	3–3	1–1	3–1	2–2	1–0	4–0	2–0	2–1	2–1
Cosenza	3–0	4–1	1–2	0–2	0–0	1–2	—	1–2	1–1	3–0	1–2	1–1	0–0	1–1	2–0	1–2	2–2	2–2	1–3	4–2
Cremonese	2–2	0–1	1–0	0–0	3–0	2–1	1–0	—	0–1	1–0	4–0	2–2	1–2	2–1	1–1	1–1	3–0	0–1	1–2	1–0
Feralpisalò	0–1	3–3	2–2	3–0	0–1	2–5	2–2	1–0	—	5–1	1–1	1–2	1–2	0–1	0–3	1–3	1–2	0–2	0–1	2–2
Lecco	0–2	1–0	0–2	3–4	1–1	0–3	1–3	0–1	1–2	—	2–3	0–1	3–2	1–3	1–0	0–1	0–0	2–1	2–3	1–2
Modena	1–0	1–1	1–2	1–3	1–1	0–0	1–1	0–1	2–3	0–0	—	0–2	3–0	2–0	2–1	0–2	0–0	1–0	2–1	1–3
Palermo	2–2	3–0	1–0	1–2	0–1	3–0	0–1	3–2	3–0	1–2	4–2	—	0–0	3–2	1–2	2–2	2–2	2–1	2–3	0–3
Parma	1–1	2–1	2–1	0–2	2–0	2–1	1–1	1–1	2–0	4–0	1–1	3–3	—	3–2	0–0	1–1	2–0	2–0	3–1	2–1
Pisa	1–0	1–1	1–1	2–2	2–1	1–1	1–2	0–0	3–1	1–2	2–2	4–3	1–2	—	2–2	2–0	2–3	2–2	1–0	1–2
Reggiana	1–1	1–1	1–1	1–0	0–2	2–2	0–4	2–2	1–1	1–1	1–0	1–3	1–1	0–0	—	1–2	0–0	1–1	0–2	1–0
Sampdoria	2–1	1–1	1–1	1–2	1–2	1–1	2–0	1–2	2–3	2–0	2–2	1–0	0–3	0–2	1–0	—	2–1	0–1	4–1	1–2
Spezia	2–1	1–0	0–0	1–1	4–2	0–1	0–0	0–1	0–2	1–1	1–1	1–0	0–1	0–0	1–2	0–0	—	2–1	2–2	2–1
Südtirol	3–1	1–0	1–1	0–1	0–0	0–1	0–1	3–0	1–0	1–0	0–0	0–1	0–0	1–2	2–3	3–1	3–3	—	4–3	0–3
Ternana	0–1	0–0	0–1	1–0	3–1	0–1	1–0	0–1	2–1	0–0	0–0	1–1	1–3	1–1	3–0	1–2	1–1	1–1	—	0–1
Venezia	3–1	3–1	2–0	2–1	2–0	3–0	1–1	2–1	2–1	2–2	2–2	1–3	3–2	2–1	2–3	5–3	1–0	2–3	1–0	—

Source: Serie B (in Italian), Soccerway (in English)
Legend: Blue = home team win; Yellow = draw; Red = away team win.

== Promotion play-offs ==
Rules:

- Preliminary round: the higher-placed team plays at home. If teams are tied after regular time, extra-time is played. If scores are still level, the higher-placed team advances;
- Semi-finals: the higher-placed team plays at home for the second leg. If teams are tied on aggregate, the higher-placed team advances;
- Final: the higher-placed team plays at home for the second leg. If teams are tied on aggregate, the higher-placed team is promoted to Serie A, unless the teams finished tied on points after regular season, in which case winner is decided by extra time and a penalty shoot-out if necessary.

Preliminary round
5	Catanzaro	4
8	Brescia	2
6	Palermo	2
7	Sampdoria	0

Semi-finals
5	Catanzaro	2	1	3
4	Cremonese	2	4	6
6	Palermo	0	1	1
3	Venezia	1	2	3

Final
4	Cremonese	0	0	0
3	Venezia	0	1	1

=== Preliminary round ===
17 May 2024	Palermo	2–0	Sampdoria	Palermo
20:30 CEST (UTC+2)	Diakité 43', 47'	Report		Stadium: Renzo Barbera; Attendance: 32,730; Referee: Andrea Colombo

18 May 2024	Catanzaro	4–2 (a.e.t.)	Brescia	Catanzaro
20:30 CEST (UTC+2)	Iemmello 26', 120+2'; Donnarumma 90+6'; Brignola 105'	Report	Galazzi 8'; Moncini 52'	Stadium: Nicola Ceravolo; Attendance: 12,370; Referee: Simone Sozza

=== Semi-finals ===
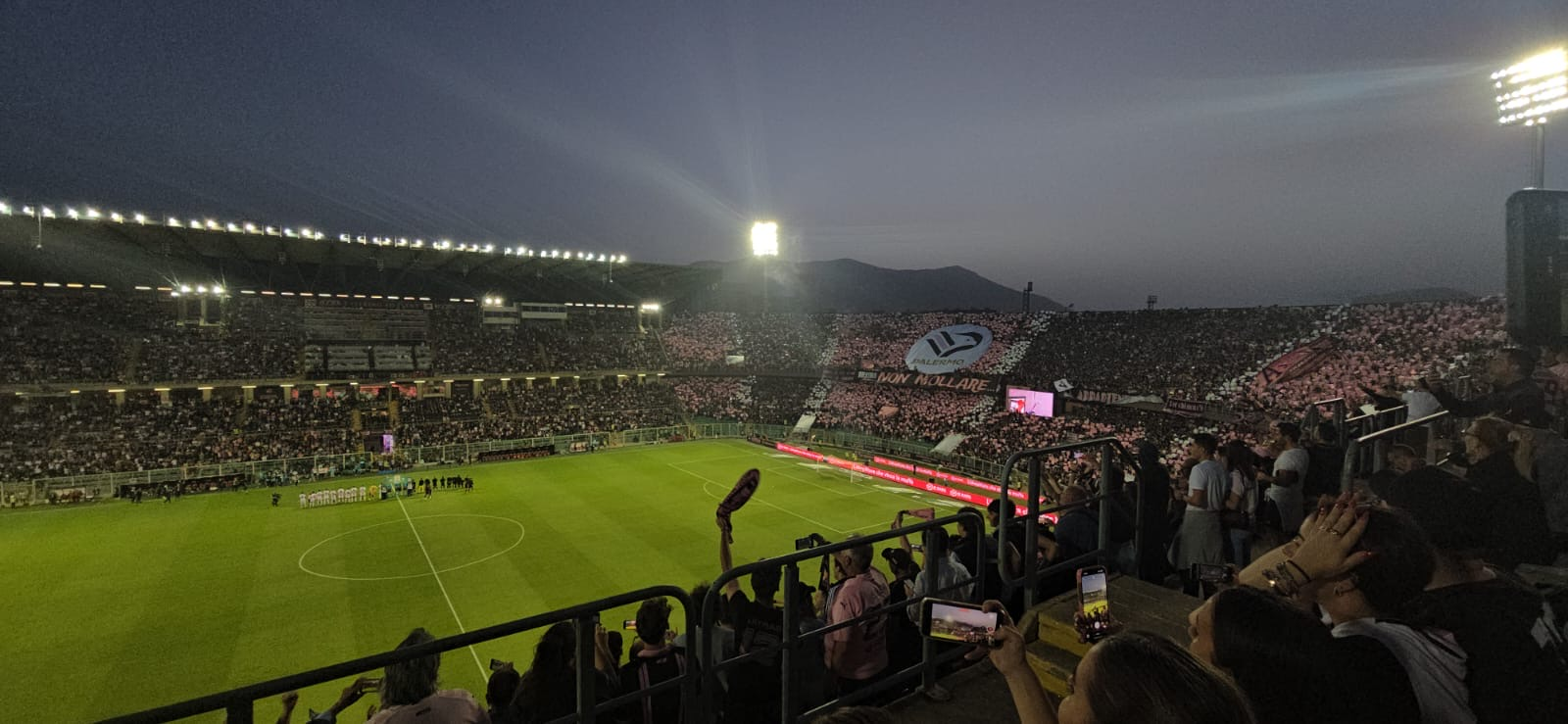
Semi-final Match between Palermo and Venice in May 2024

==== First leg ====
20 May 2024	Palermo	0–1	Venezia	Palermo
20:30 CEST (UTC+2)		Report	Pierini 62'	Stadium: Renzo Barbera; Attendance: 32,753; Referee: Antonio Giua

21 May 2024	Catanzaro	2–2	Cremonese	Catanzaro
20:30 CEST (UTC+2)	Biasci 51'; Brignola 68'	Report	Tsadjout 14'; Ciofani 50'	Stadium: Nicola Ceravolo; Attendance: 12,623; Referee: Matteo Marcenaro

==== Second leg ====
24 May 2024	Venezia	2–1 (3–1 agg.)	Palermo	Venice
20:30 CEST (UTC+2)	Tessmann 4'; Candela 43'	Report	Svoboda 86' (o.g.)	Stadium: Pier Luigi Penzo; Attendance: 10,493; Referee: Luca Pairetto

25 May 2024	Cremonese	4–1 (6–3 agg.)	Catanzaro	Cremona
20:30 CEST (UTC+2)	Vázquez 12'; Buonaiuto 19'; Coda 37'; Sernicola 69'	Report	Antonini 80'	Stadium: Giovanni Zini; Attendance: 12,992; Referee: Maurizio Mariani

=== Final ===
==== First leg ====
30 May 2024	Cremonese	0–0	Venezia	Cremona
20:30 CEST (UTC+2)		Report		Stadium: Giovanni Zini; Attendance: 12,890; Referee: Andrea Colombo

==== Second leg ====
2 June 2024	Venezia	1–0 (1–0 agg.)	Cremonese	Venice
20:30 CEST (UTC+2)	Gytkjær 24'			Stadium: Pier Luigi Penzo; Attendance: 11,150; Referee: Simone Sozza

== Relegation play-out ==
The higher-placed team played at home for the second leg. If the teams were tied on aggregate, the lower-placed team was relegated to Serie C, unless the teams finished tied on points after the regular season, in which case the winner would be decided by extra time and a penalty shoot-out if necessary.

Team 1	Agg.	Team 2	1st leg	2nd leg
Bari	4–1	Ternana	1–1	3–0

=== First leg ===
16 May 2024	Bari	1–1	Ternana	Bari
20:30 CEST (UTC+2)	Nasti 59'	Report	Pereiro 82'	Stadium: San Nicola; Attendance: 33,808; Referee: Gianluca Aureliano

=== Second leg ===
23 May 2024	Ternana	0–3 (1–4 agg.)	Bari	Terni
20:30 CEST (UTC+2)		Report	Di Cesare 45+2'; Ricci 51'; Sibilli 64'	Stadium: Libero Liberati; Attendance: 11,483; Referee: Federico La Penna

== Season statistics ==
=== Top goalscorers ===
Rank	Player	Club	Goals
1	(Finland) Joel Pohjanpalo	Venezia	22
2	(Italy) Gennaro Tutino	Cosenza	20
3	(Italy) Matteo Brunori	Palermo	17
3	(Italy) Massimo Coda^{1}	Cremonese	17
3	(Italy) Pietro Iemmello^{2}	Catanzaro	17
6	(Italy) Daniele Casiraghi	Südtirol	16
7	(Italy) Patrick Cutrone	Como	14
8	(Denmark) Christian Gytkjær^{1}	Venezia	12
9	(Italy) Tommaso Biasci^{1}	Catanzaro	11
9	(Romania) Dennis Man	Parma	11
9	(Portugal) Pedro Mendes	Ascoli	11
9	(Italy) Gabriele Moncini^{1}	Brescia	11
9	(Italy) Giuseppe Sibilli	Bari	11

Note

^{1} Player scored 1 goals in the play-offs.
^{2} Player scored 2 goals in the play-offs.

=== Hat-tricks ===
Player	Club	Against	Result	Date
(Italy) Matteo Brunori	Palermo	Venezia	3–1 (A)	26 September 2023
(Finland) Joel Pohjanpalo	Venezia	Sampdoria	5–3 (H)	14 January 2024
(Italy) Gennaro Tutino	Cosenza	Venezia	4–2 (H)	20 January 2024
(Italy) Manuel De Luca	Sampdoria	Ternana	4–1 (H)	1 April 2024
(Italy) Fabio Borini	Sampdoria	Catanzaro	3–1 (A)	10 May 2024

Note

(H) – Home (A) – Away

=== Clean sheets ===
Rank	Player	Club	Clean sheets	Game weeks
1	(Argentina) Leandro Chichizola	Parma	14	1–2, 4–5, 12, 15, 17, 19, 21, 32–35, 37
2	(Finland) Jesse Joronen^{3}	Venezia	13	1, 4–6, 22, 24, 27, 30, 32–33
2	(Croatia) Adrian Šemper	Como	13	4, 6–7, 11, 13, 3, (Note: Played between rounds 14 and 15.) 15, 20, 23–24, 27, 31, 37
4	(Italy) Alessandro Micai	Cosenza	11	1, 6, 9, 11, 13, 17–18, 22, 29, 34, 38
5	(Italy) Andrea Fulignati	Catanzaro	10	1, 3, 9–10, 14, 16, 27–28, 31, 34
5	(Denmark) Andreas Jungdal	Cremonese	10	13–16, 18, 20–22, 25, 28
5	(Albania) Elhan Kastrati	Cittadella	10	1, 4, 13, 15–16, 19–20, 32–34
5	(Italy) Giacomo Poluzzi	Südtirol	10	2, 7, 10, 20, 26, 28, 30, 32–34
9	(Italy) Francesco Bardi	Reggiana	9	4, 7, 10–11, 19, 22, 26, 28, 36
9	(Italy) Riccardo Gagno	Modena	9	2, 4, 6–8, 1, (Note: Played between rounds 10 and 11.) 34–35, 37
9	(Italy) Mirko Pigliacelli	Palermo	9	1, 4–5, 9, 2, (Note: Played between rounds 12 and 13.) 23, 25, 29, 34
9	(Italy) Emiliano Viviano	Ascoli	9	3, 7, 10, 17, 19, 22, 25–26, 28

^{3} Player kept 3 clean-sheets in the play-offs.

== Awards ==
=== Monthly ===
Month	MVP of the Month		Ref
September	(Italy) Massimo Coda	Cremonese	
October	(Romania) Dennis Man	Parma	
November	(Italy) Giuseppe Sibilli	Bari	
December	(Italy) Sebastiano Esposito	Sampdoria	
January	(Italy) Jacopo Segre	Palermo	
February	(Finland) Joel Pohjanpalo	Venezia	
March	(Finland) Joel Pohjanpalo	Venezia	
April	(Italy) Gennaro Tutino	Cosenza	

=== Annual ===
Award	Winner	Club	Ref
MVP of the season	(Italy) Patrick Cutrone	Como	

== Attendances ==
Palermo FC drew the highest average home attendance in the 2023-24 edition of the Serie B.

#	Football club	Home games	Average attendance
1	Palermo FC	19	22,717
2	Sampdoria	19	22,536
3	SSC Bari	19	17,366
4	Parma Calcio 1913	19	13,477
5	Modena FC	19	10,067
6	US Catanzaro	19	9,800
7	Reggiana	19	9,784
8	Cremonese	19	9,300
9	Ascoli Calcio	19	7,075
10	Pisa SC	19	7,036
11	Cosenza Calcio	19	6,908
12	Venezia FC	19	6,712
13	Como 1907	19	6,012
14	Spezia Calcio	19	5,949
15	Brescia Calcio	19	5,370
16	Ternana Calcio	19	5,142
17	Calcio Lecco 1912	19	4,021
18	AS Cittadella	19	3,874
19	FC Südtirol	19	3,867
20	Feralpisalò	19	2,057
