= 2022–23 Serie B =

Italian football league season

Serie B
- Season: 2022–23
- Dates: Regular season: 12 August 2022 – 19 May 2023; Play-offs: 26 May 2023 – 11 June 2023
- Champions: Frosinone (1st title)
- Promoted: Frosinone; Genoa; Cagliari (via play-offs)
- Relegated: Perugia; SPAL; Benevento; Reggina (to D)
- Matches: 380
- Goals: 891 (2.34 per match)
- Top goalscorer: Gianluca Lapadula (21+4 goals)
- Biggest home win: SPAL 5–0 Cosenza (22 October 2022); Venezia 5–0 Modena (1 May 2023)
- Biggest away win: Perugia 0–5 Cagliari (5 May 2023)
- Highest scoring: Bari 6–2 Brescia (1 October 2022)
- Longest winning run: 6 matches Frosinone (8–13 and 19–24)
- Longest unbeaten run: 14 matches Pisa (6–19)
- Longest winless run: 17 matches Brescia (15–31)
- Longest losing run: 7 matches Brescia (20–26)
- Highest attendance: 58,206; Bari 0–1 Cagliari (Play-offs)
- Lowest attendance: 2,323; Cittadella 1–0 Frosinone
- Total attendance: 4,002,387
- Average attendance: 10,263

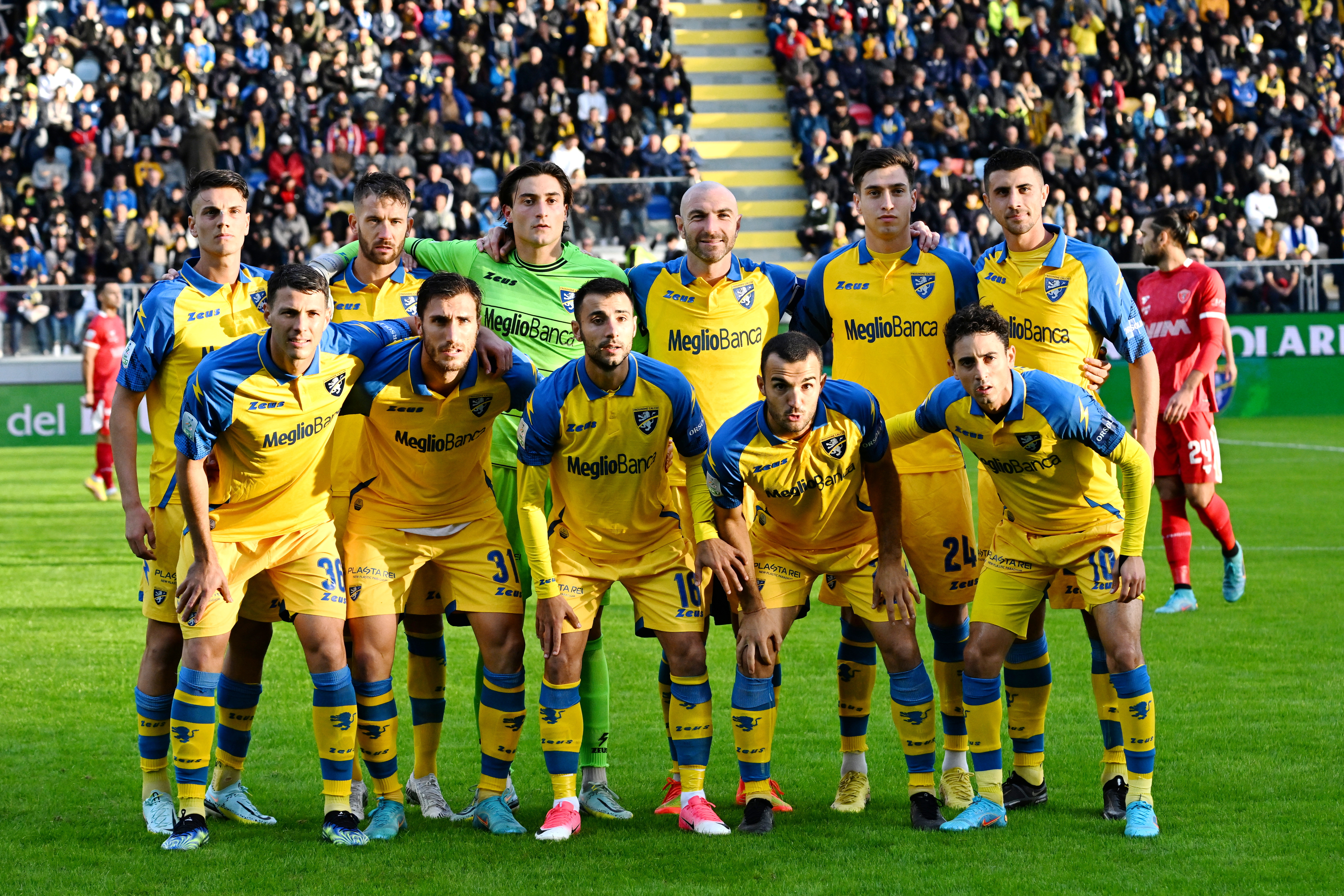
Squadra - Frosinone Calcio - DSC 2755 AF

The 2022–23 Serie B (known as the Serie BKT for sponsorship reasons) was the 91st season of the Serie B since its establishment in 1929.

== Changes ==
The following teams have changed division since the 2021–22 season:

=== To Serie B ===
Relegated from Serie A

- Cagliari
- Genoa
- Venezia

Promoted from Serie C

- Südtirol (Group A)
- Modena (Group B)
- Bari (Group C)
- Palermo (Play-off winners)

=== From Serie B ===
Promoted to Serie A

- Lecce
- Cremonese
- Monza

Relegated to Serie C

- Vicenza
- Alessandria
- Crotone
- Pordenone

Südtirol played in Serie B for the first time in history for this season, the 124th team entering in this round robin league.

== Teams ==
=== Stadiums and locations ===
Location of teams in 2022–23 Serie B

Team	Home city	Stadium	Capacity	2021–22 season
Ascoli	Ascoli Piceno	Cino e Lillo Del Duca	12,461	6th in Serie B
Bari	Bari	San Nicola	58,270	Serie C Group C champions
Benevento	Benevento	Ciro Vigorito	16,867	7th in Serie B
Brescia	Brescia	Mario Rigamonti	19,500	5th in Serie B
Cagliari	Cagliari	Unipol Domus	16,416	18th in Serie A
Cittadella	Cittadella (Padua)	Pier Cesare Tombolato	7,623	11th in Serie B
Como	Como	Giuseppe Sinigaglia	13,602	13th in Serie B
Cosenza	Cosenza	San Vito-Gigi Marulla	24,209	16th in Serie B
Frosinone	Frosinone	Benito Stirpe	16,227	9th in Serie B
Genoa	Genoa	Luigi Ferraris	36,599	19th in Serie A
Modena	Modena	Alberto Braglia	21,092	Serie C Group B champions
Palermo	Palermo	Renzo Barbera	36,365	Serie C Playoff winner
Parma	Parma	Ennio Tardini	27,906	12th in Serie B
Perugia	Perugia	Renato Curi	23,625	8th in Serie B
Pisa	Pisa	Arena Garibaldi	25,000	3rd in Serie B
Reggina	Reggio Calabria	Oreste Granillo	27,543	14th in Serie B
SPAL	Ferrara	Paolo Mazza	16,134	15th in Serie B
Südtirol	Bolzano	Druso	5,539	Serie C Group A champions
Ternana	Terni	Libero Liberati	22,000	10th in Serie B
Venezia	Venice	Pier Luigi Penzo	11,150	20th in Serie A

=== Personnel and kits ===
Team	President	Manager	Captain	Kit manufacturer	Shirt Sponsor (front)	Shirt Sponsor (back)	Shirt Sponsor (sleeve)	Shorts Sponsor
Ascoli	(Italy) Carlo Neri	(Italy) Roberto Breda	(Italy) Federico Dionisi	Nike	Fainplast	Bricofer/Rabona Mobile/northsixthgroup/Distretti Ecologici	Impresa Turzo (H)/Edil Style (A)	Gruppo Boero
Bari	(Italy) Luigi De Laurentiis	(Italy) Michele Mignani	(Italy) Valerio Di Cesare	Kappa	Molino Casillo, Acqua Amata	MV Line	Decò Supermercati	Granoro
Benevento	(Italy) Oreste Vigorito	(Italy) Andrea Agostinelli	(Italy) Gaetano Letizia	Nike	IVPC, Rillo Costruzioni	Pastificio Rummo	Contrader	None
Brescia	(Italy) Massimo Cellino	(Italy) Daniele Gastaldello	(Italy) Dimitri Bisoli	Kappa	Rigamonti Salumificio	Le Stagioni d'Italia	Pardgroup	None
Cagliari	(Italy) Tommaso Giulini	(Italy) Claudio Ranieri	(Italy) Leonardo Pavoletti	EYE Sport	Sardegna Artigianato, Fondazione Mont'e Prama	Ichnusa	Arborea	Blue Shark
Cittadella	(Italy) Andrea Gabrielli	(Italy) Edoardo Gorini	(Italy) Romano Perticone	Erreà	Sirmax, Gruppo Gabrielli	Stylplex (H)/Quartzforms (A)	Pastificio Cecchin	Scilm (H)/Stylplex (A)
Como	(England) Dennis Wise	(Italy) Moreno Longo	(Italy) Alessandro Bellemo	Erreà	Mola (H & A), Quelli che con Luca	Acqua S.Bernardo	None	None
Cosenza	(Italy) Eugenio Guarascio	(Italy) William Viali	(Italy) Michele Rigione	Nike	Salumi di Calabria, Mi'Ndujo	Gruppo Malizia	Scintille Montesanto	3F Falvo Group
Frosinone	(Italy) Maurizio Stirpe	(Italy) Fabio Grosso	(Italy) Fabio Lucioni	Zeus	MeglioBanca	Polsinelli Enologia	Orsolini	Plasta Rei
Genoa	(Italy) Alberto Zangrillo	(Italy) Alberto Gilardino	(Croatia) Milan Badelj	Castore	Radio 105, MSC Cruises	LeasePlan	None	Portofino Mare
Modena	(Italy) Carlo Rivetti	(Italy) Attilio Tesser	(Italy) Antonio Pergreffi	New Balance	Kerakoll	SAU	BPR Nutrition	Studio Appari
Palermo	(Italy) Dario Mirri	(Italy) Eugenio Corini	(Italy) Matteo Brunori	Kappa	Decò Supermercati, Bisaten	A29 Energy Service Company	L.T. Costruzioni	Nuova Sicilauto
Parma	(United States) Kyle J. Krause	(Italy) Fabio Pecchia	(Italy) Gianluigi Buffon	Erreà	Prometeon, Classic Football Shirts	ITCompany	Agenzia Viaggi Fontana nel Mondo	OARO
Perugia	(Italy) Massimiliano Santopadre	(Italy) Fabrizio Castori	(Italy) Gabriele Angella	Frankie Garage	VIM, Vitakraft	Re Salmone	SISAS	Mericat
Pisa	(Italy) Giuseppe Corrado	(Italy) Luca D'Angelo	(Romania) Marius Marin	Adidas	Cetilar, Cavarretta Assicurazioni/SEAC	Hi-turf Solution	Gruppo Paim	Toni Luigi Scavi e Demolizioni
Reggina	(Italy) Felice Saladini	(Italy) Filippo Inzaghi	(Italy) Lorenzo Crisetig	Givova	Canale Group, Ferraro SpA	Soseteg	Caffè Mauro	Securmed Group
SPAL	(United States) Joe Tacopina	(Italy) Massimo Oddo	(Italy) Lorenzo Dickmann	Macron	Rotary Club Ferrara Est-Rotary Club Ferrara-A-ROSE Associazione/Iosco Group, Adamant BioNRG	Errebi Technology	Edilalba	Cablaggi Iosco/Diemme Costruzioni
Südtirol	(Italy) Gerhard Comper	(Italy) Pierpaolo Bisoli	(Italy) Fabian Tait	Mizuno	Südtirol, Duka	TopHaus	Alperia	Ci Gusta
Ternana	(Italy) Stefano Bandecchi	(Italy) Cristiano Lucarelli	(Italy) Marino Defendi	Macron	Unicusano, Terni col Cuore	Caffè Ternano Cuore Umbro	Orsolini	None
Venezia	(United States) Duncan L. Niederauer	(Italy) Paolo Vanoli	(Italy) Marco Modolo	Kappa	None	None	Bechèr	None

=== Managerial changes ===
Team	Outgoing manager	Manner of departure	Date of vacancy	Position in table	Replaced by	Date of appointment
Ascoli	(Italy) Andrea Sottil	Mutual consent	6 June 2022	Pre-season	(Italy) Cristian Bucchi	1 July 2022
Perugia	(Italy) Massimiliano Alvini	Mutual consent	8 June 2022	Pre-season	(Italy) Fabrizio Castori	1 July 2022
Südtirol	(Croatia) Ivan Javorčić	Mutual consent	9 June 2022	Pre-season	(Italy) Lamberto Zauli	1 July 2022
Parma	(Italy) Giuseppe Iachini	End of contract	30 June 2022	Pre-season	(Italy) Fabio Pecchia	1 July 2022
Cagliari	(Italy) Alessandro Agostini	End of caretaker spell	8 June 2022	Pre-season	(Italy) Fabio Liverani	1 July 2022
Venezia	(Italy) Andrea Soncin	End of caretaker spell	9 June 2022	Pre-season	(Croatia) Ivan Javorčić	1 July 2022
Brescia	(Italy) Eugenio Corini	Mutual consent	14 June 2022	Pre-season	(Spain) Pep Clotet	1 July 2022
Cosenza	(Italy) Pierpaolo Bisoli	Mutual consent	15 June 2022	Pre-season	(Italy) Davide Dionigi	1 July 2022
Pisa	(Italy) Luca D'Angelo	Mutual consent	14 June 2022	Pre-season	(Italy) Rolando Maran	1 July 2022
Reggina	(Italy) Roberto Stellone	End of contract	30 June 2022	Pre-season	(Italy) Filippo Inzaghi	12 July 2022
Palermo	(Italy) Silvio Baldini	Resigned	27 July 2022	Pre-season	(Italy) Stefano Di Benedetto (caretaker)	28 July 2022
Palermo	(Italy) Stefano Di Benedetto	End of caretaker spell	7 August 2022	Pre-season	(Italy) Eugenio Corini	7 August 2022
Südtirol	(Italy) Lamberto Zauli	Mutual consent	9 August 2022	Pre-season	(Italy) Leandro Greco (caretaker)	9 August 2022
Südtirol	(Italy) Leandro Greco	End of caretaker spell	29 August 2022	20th	(Italy) Pierpaolo Bisoli	29 August 2022
Como	(Italy) Giacomo Gattuso	Extended leave of absence	8 September 2022	18th	(Italy) Massimiliano Guidetti (caretaker)	8 September 2022
Pisa	(Italy) Rolando Maran	Sacked	19 September 2022	20th	(Italy) Luca D'Angelo	19 September 2022
Perugia	(Italy) Fabrizio Castori	Sacked	19 September 2022	17th	(Italy) Silvio Baldini	20 September 2022
Como	(Italy) Massimiliano Guidetti	End of caretaker spell	20 September 2022	19th	(Italy) Moreno Longo	20 September 2022
Benevento	(Italy) Fabio Caserta	Sacked	20 September 2022	12th	(Italy) Fabio Cannavaro	21 September 2022
SPAL	(Italy) Roberto Venturato	Sacked	9 October 2022	14th	(Italy) Daniele De Rossi	11 October 2022
Perugia	(Italy) Silvio Baldini	Resigned	19 October 2022	20th	(Italy) Fabrizio Castori	19 October 2022
Venezia	(Croatia) Ivan Javorčić	Sacked	31 October 2022	18th	(Italy) Andrea Soncin (caretaker)	1 November 2022
Cosenza	(Italy) Davide Dionigi	Sacked	31 October 2022	16th	(Italy) William Viali	2 November 2022
Venezia	(Italy) Andrea Soncin	End of caretaker spell	7 November 2022	19th	(Italy) Paolo Vanoli	7 November 2022
Ternana	(Italy) Cristiano Lucarelli	Sacked	26 November 2022	7th	(Italy) Aurelio Andreazzoli	2 December 2022
Genoa	(Germany) Alexander Blessin	Sacked	6 December 2022	5th	(Italy) Alberto Gilardino	6 December 2022
Cagliari	(Italy) Fabio Liverani	Sacked	20 December 2022	14th	(Italy) Roberto Muzzi (caretaker)	20 December 2022
Brescia	(Spain) Pep Clotet	Sacked	21 December 2022	10th	(Italy) Alfredo Aglietti	21 December 2022
Cagliari	(Italy) Roberto Muzzi	End of caretaker spell	1 January 2023	14th	(Italy) Claudio Ranieri	1 January 2023
Brescia	(Italy) Alfredo Aglietti	Sacked	16 January 2023	13th	(Spain) Pep Clotet	16 January 2023
Ascoli	(Italy) Cristian Bucchi	Sacked	4 February 2023	13th	(Italy) Roberto Breda	6 February 2023
Benevento	(Italy) Fabio Cannavaro	Sacked	4 February 2023	19th	(Italy) Roberto Stellone	6 February 2023
Brescia	(Spain) Pep Clotet	Sacked	6 February 2023	16th	(Italy) Davide Possanzini	7 February 2023
SPAL	(Italy) Daniele De Rossi	Sacked	14 February 2023	18th	(Italy) Massimo Oddo	14 February 2023
Brescia	(Italy) Davide Possanzini	Sacked	20 February 2023	19th	(Italy) Daniele Gastaldello	20 February 2023
Ternana	(Italy) Aurelio Andreazzoli	Resigned	25 February 2023	11th	(Italy) Cristiano Lucarelli	27 February 2023
Benevento	(Italy) Roberto Stellone	Resigned	10 April 2023	20th	(Italy) Andrea Agostinelli	12 April 2023

== League table ==
Pos	Team	Pld	W	D	L	GF	GA	GD	Pts	Promotion, qualification or relegation
1	Frosinone (C, P)	38	24	8	6	63	26	+37	80	Promotion to Serie A
2	Genoa (Note: Genoa were deducted one point due to income tax payment irregularities.) (P)	38	21	11	6	53	28	+25	73	Promotion to Serie A
3	Bari	38	17	14	7	58	37	+21	65	Qualification for promotion play-offs semi-finals
4	Parma (Note: Parma were deducted one point for missing the deadline to fulfil obligations for February taxes on the salary bill.)	38	17	10	11	48	39	+9	60 (Note: Parma finished ahead of Cagliari on head-to-head points: Cagliari 1–1 Parma, Parma 2–1 Cagliari.)	Qualification for promotion play-offs semi-finals
5	Cagliari (O, P)	38	15	15	8	50	34	+16	60	Qualification for promotion play-offs preliminary round
6	Südtirol	38	14	16	8	38	34	+4	58	Qualification for promotion play-offs preliminary round
7	Reggina (Note: Reggina were deducted five points for failing to pay taxes and player salaries on time. The deduction was initially seven points; later relegated to Serie D after enduring serious financial difficulties for several years. Brescia was readmitted into Serie B.) (E)	38	17	4	17	49	45	+4	50	Revival in Serie D
8	Venezia	38	13	10	15	51	50	+1	49	Qualification for promotion play-offs preliminary round
9	Palermo	38	11	16	11	48	49	−1	49	
10	Modena	38	13	9	16	47	53	−6	48	
11	Pisa	38	11	14	13	48	42	+6	47 (Note: Head-to-head points: Pisa 5, Ascoli 5, Como 4. Head-to-head goal difference: Pisa +1, Ascoli −1.)	
12	Ascoli	38	12	11	15	40	47	−7	47	
13	Como	38	10	17	11	47	48	−1	47	
14	Ternana	38	11	10	17	37	52	−15	43 (Note: Ternana finished ahead of Cittadella on head-to-head goal difference: Cittadella 0–2 Ternana, Ternana 1–2 Cittadella.)	
15	Cittadella	38	9	16	13	34	45	−11	43	
16	Brescia	38	9	13	16	36	57	−21	40	Spared from relegation
17	Cosenza (O)	38	9	13	16	30	53	−23	40	Qualification for relegation play-out
18	Perugia (R)	38	10	9	19	40	52	−12	39	Relegation to Serie C
19	SPAL (R)	38	8	14	16	41	51	−10	38	Relegation to Serie C
20	Benevento (R)	38	7	14	17	33	49	−16	35	Relegation to Serie C

Source: Soccerway (in English)
Rules for classification: 1) Points; 2) Head-to-head points; 3) Head-to-head goal difference; 4) Goal difference; 5) Goals scored; 6) Draw.
(C) Champions; (E) Eliminated; (O) Play-off winners; (P) Promoted; (R) Relegated

=== Positions by round ===
The table lists the positions of teams after each week of matches. In order to preserve chronological evolvements, any postponed matches are not included to the round at which they were originally scheduled, but added to the full round that were played immediately afterwards.

Team ╲ Round	1	2	3	4	5	6	7	8	9	10	11	12	13	14	15	16	17	18	19	20	21	22	23	24	25	26	27	28	29	30	31	32	33	34	35	36	37	38
Frosinone	8	1	4	2	4	3	6	5	3	1	1	1	1	1	1	1	1	1	1	1	1	1	1	1	1	1	1	1	1	1	1	1	1	1	1	1	1	1
Genoa	6	6	2	5	9	5	4	6	5	2	2	3	3	3	5	4	4	4	3	3	3	2	2	2	2	2	2	2	2	2	2	2	2	2	2	2	2	2
Bari	9	12	7	9	5	4	2	2	4	5	5	5	6	5	3	3	3	3	4	4	4	5	5	3	3	3	3	3	3	4	3	3	3	3	3	3	3	3
Parma	10	14	8	10	14	8	7	7	6	8	6	6	4	6	4	7	5	6	6	9	7	10	7	8	11	7	8	7	8	9	7	7	7	5	5	5	5	4
Cagliari	11	5	12	7	3	6	9	9	8	10	10	10	10	11	12	12	11	14	11	8	8	6	9	6	6	8	7	8	7	6	5	6	6	6	6	6	6	5
Südtirol	20	20	20	17	15	15	10	10	9	7	9	9	8	8	8	9	9	7	7	6	5	4	4	5	4	5	4	4	4	3	4	4	4	4	4	4	4	6
Reggina	1	7	3	1	1	1	1	1	2	4	4	2	2	2	2	2	2	2	2	2	2	3	3	4	5	4	5	6	6	7	8	5	5	8	8	11	10	7
Venezia	15	9	11	14	16	16	13	16	16	17	18	19	19	19	18	18	15	16	17	18	18	19	18	13	15	16	16	16	16	16	14	14	14	14	10	10	7	8
Palermo	3	3	9	13	12	14	16	17	17	18	14	13	13	16	14	13	14	11	13	12	11	9	6	10	9	9	9	9	9	8	9	9	10	9	11	7	8	9
Modena	17	19	15	16	18	18	17	11	10	12	13	15	15	12	10	10	13	13	10	11	10	11	11	9	8	10	11	12	10	12	11	10	11	10	12	12	13	10
Pisa	13	15	18	19	20	20	18	18	18	15	15	14	11	10	11	8	8	5	5	5	6	8	10	7	7	6	6	5	5	5	6	8	8	7	7	9	9	11
Ascoli	5	4	1	4	8	11	12	13	11	9	7	7	9	9	9	11	10	9	9	10	12	12	13	12	12	13	10	10	12	13	13	13	12	11	9	8	11	12
Como	12	13	17	18	19	19	20	19	19	19	19	16	18	18	19	19	19	17	15	16	16	13	15	14	16	14	14	13	11	10	12	11	13	13	13	13	12	13
Ternana	14	10	16	15	13	7	5	3	1	3	3	4	5	7	7	5	6	8	8	7	9	7	8	11	10	11	12	11	13	11	10	12	9	12	14	14	14	14
Cittadella	4	8	10	11	6	12	15	15	14	13	12	12	14	13	13	14	16	18	19	17	17	16	12	15	13	12	13	14	14	14	15	15	15	16	16	15	15	15
Brescia	2	11	6	3	2	2	3	4	7	6	8	8	7	4	6	6	7	10	12	13	13	14	16	17	19	19	18	19	20	20	20	19	19	18	15	17	17	16
Cosenza	7	2	5	8	11	10	8	8	12	14	16	18	17	17	15	16	18	19	20	20	20	20	20	20	20	20	19	20	17	17	16	16	16	15	17	16	16	17
Perugia	19	18	19	20	17	17	19	20	20	20	20	20	20	20	20	20	20	20	18	19	19	18	14	16	14	15	15	15	15	15	17	17	17	17	18	18	18	18
SPAL	18	17	14	12	7	9	11	14	13	11	11	11	12	14	16	17	17	15	16	14	14	15	17	18	18	18	20	17	19	19	18	18	18	19	19	19	19	19
Benevento	16	16	13	6	10	13	14	12	15	16	17	17	16	15	17	15	12	12	14	15	15	17	19	19	17	17	17	18	18	18	19	20	20	20	20	20	20	20

Leader and promotion to Serie A
Promotion to Serie A
Play-off semifinals
Play-off preliminary round
Play-out
Relegation to Serie C

Source: WorldFootball.net

== Results ==
Home \ Away	ASC	BAR	BEN	BRE	CAG	CIT	COM	COS	FRO	GEN	MOD	PAL	PAR	PER	PIS	REG	SPA	SUD	TER	VEN
Ascoli	—	0–1	0–0	4–3	2–1	0–0	3–3	1–1	0–1	0–0	1–2	1–2	1–3	1–0	2–1	0–1	1–1	1–0	2–1	0–1
Bari	0–2	—	2–0	6–2	1–1	1–1	2–2	2–1	0–0	1–2	4–1	1–1	4–0	0–2	0–0	1–0	2–2	2–2	0–0	1–0
Benevento	1–1	1–1	—	1–0	0–2	1–0	0–0	0–1	2–1	1–2	2–1	0–1	2–2	0–2	0–0	1–2	1–3	0–2	2–3	1–2
Brescia	1–1	0–2	1–0	—	1–1	1–1	0–1	2–1	1–3	0–3	0–1	1–1	0–2	2–1	1–1	0–2	2–0	2–0	1–0	1–1
Cagliari	4–1	0–1	1–0	2–1	—	2–1	2–0	2–0	0–0	0–0	1–0	2–1	1–1	3–2	1–1	1–1	2–1	1–1	2–1	1–4
Cittadella	3–0	0–3	3–1	0–0	0–0	—	0–0	1–1	1–0	0–1	0–0	3–3	0–1	0–2	4–3	3–2	0–0	0–2	0–2	1–1
Como	1–1	1–1	2–1	0–1	1–1	2–0	—	5–1	0–2	2–2	1–0	1–1	2–0	1–0	2–2	0–1	3–3	0–2	3–1	1–0
Cosenza	1–3	0–1	1–1	1–1	0–1	1–1	3–1	—	1–2	1–2	2–1	3–2	1–0	0–0	1–0	2–1	1–0	0–0	0–0	1–1
Frosinone	2–0	1–0	1–0	3–0	2–2	3–0	2–0	0–1	—	3–2	2–1	1–0	3–4	1–0	0–0	3–1	2–0	0–0	3–0	3–0
Genoa	2–1	4–3	0–0	1–1	0–0	0–1	1–1	4–0	1–0	—	1–0	2–0	3–3	2–0	0–0	1–0	3–0	2–0	1–0	1–0
Modena	0–1	1–1	1–1	1–3	2–0	0–0	5–1	2–0	0–1	2–2	—	0–2	1–1	1–1	1–0	1–0	0–0	2–1	4–1	2–2
Palermo	2–3	1–0	1–1	2–2	2–1	0–0	0–0	0–0	1–1	1–0	5–2	—	1–0	2–0	3–3	2–1	2–1	0–1	0–0	0–1
Parma	0–1	2–2	0–1	2–0	2–1	3–1	1–0	1–0	2–1	2–0	1–2	2–1	—	2–0	0–1	2–0	0–1	0–0	2–3	2–1
Perugia	1–0	1–3	3–2	4–0	0–5	0–2	0–0	0–0	1–1	1–0	0–1	3–3	0–0	—	1–3	1–3	0–0	1–2	3–0	2–1
Pisa	2–0	1–2	2–0	3–0	0–0	1–2	2–2	3–1	1–3	0–1	4–2	1–1	0–0	2–1	—	0–1	1–2	0–1	3–1	1–1
Reggina	1–0	0–0	2–2	1–2	0–4	3–0	2–1	3–0	0–3	2–1	2–1	3–0	0–1	2–3	0–2	—	0–1	4–0	2–1	1–0
SPAL	1–1	3–4	1–2	2–2	1–0	2–1	1–1	5–0	0–2	0–2	2–3	1–1	0–1	1–1	0–1	1–3	—	1–1	1–1	2–0
Südtirol	2–2	0–1	1–1	1–0	2–2	1–1	1–1	1–1	1–1	0–0	0–2	1–1	1–0	2–1	2–1	2–1	2–0	—	0–0	1–2
Ternana	1–0	1–0	2–2	0–0	1–0	1–2	0–3	1–1	2–3	1–2	2–1	3–0	1–1	1–0	2–1	1–0	0–0	0–1	—	1–4
Venezia	0–1	1–2	0–2	1–1	0–0	1–1	3–2	2–0	1–3	1–2	5–0	3–2	2–2	3–2	1–1	1–2	2–1	0–1	2–1	—

Source: Serie B (in Italian), Soccerway (in English)
Legend: Blue = home team win; Yellow = draw; Red = away team win.

== Promotion play-offs ==
Rules:

- Preliminary round: the higher-placed team plays at home. If teams were tied after regular time, extra-time was played. If scores were still level, the higher-placed team advanced;
- Semi-finals: the higher-placed team played at home for the second leg. If teams were tied on aggregate, the higher-placed team advanced;
- Final: the higher-placed team played at home for the second leg. If teams were tied on aggregate, the higher-placed team was promoted to Serie A, unless the teams finished tied on points after regular season, in which case winner was decided by extra time and a penalty shoot-out if necessary.

Preliminary round
5	Cagliari	2
8	Venezia	1
6	Südtirol	1
7	Reggina	0

Semi-finals
5	Cagliari	3	0	3
4	Parma	2	0	2
6	Südtirol	1	0	1
3	Bari	0	1	1

Final
5	Cagliari	1	1	2
3	Bari	1	0	1

=== Preliminary round ===
26 May 2023	Südtirol	1–0	Reggina	Bolzano
20:30 CEST (UTC+2)	Casiraghi 89'	Report		Stadium: Druso; Attendance: 5,419; Referee: Antonio Rapuano

27 May 2023	Cagliari	2–1	Venezia	Cagliari
20:30 CEST (UTC+2)	Lapadula 14', 18'	Report	Pierini 52'	Stadium: Unipol Domus; Attendance: 16,504; Referee: Marco Di Bello

=== Semi-finals ===
==== First leg ====
29 May 2023	Südtirol	1–0	Bari	Bolzano
20:30 CEST (UTC+2)	Rover 90+2'	Report		Stadium: Druso; Attendance: 5,520; Referee: Federico Dionisi

30 May 2023	Cagliari	3–2	Parma	Cagliari
20:30 CEST (UTC+2)	Luvumbo 68', 89'; Lapadula 85' (pen.)	Report	Benedyczak 10'; Sohm 26'	Stadium: Unipol Domus; Attendance: 16,110; Referee: Andrea Colombo

==== Second leg ====
2 June 2023	Bari	1–0 (1–1 agg.)	Südtirol	Bari
20:30 CEST (UTC+2)	Benedetti 70'	Report		Stadium: San Nicola; Attendance: 51,621; Referee: Simone Sozza

3 June 2023	Parma	0–0 (2–3 agg.)	Cagliari	Parma
20:30 CEST (UTC+2)		Report		Stadium: Stadio Ennio Tardini; Attendance: 17,437; Referee: Daniele Orsato

=== Final ===
==== First leg ====
8 June 2023	Cagliari	1–1	Bari	Cagliari
20:30 CEST (UTC+2)	Lapadula 9'	Report	Antenucci 90+6' (pen.)	Stadium: Unipol Domus; Attendance: 16,248; Referee: Maurizio Mariani

==== Second leg ====
11 June 2023	Bari	0–1 (1–2 agg.)	Cagliari	Bari
20:30 CEST (UTC+2)		Report	Pavoletti 90+4'	Stadium: San Nicola; Attendance: 58,206; Referee: Marco Guida

== Relegation play-out ==
The higher-placed team played at home for the second leg. If the teams were tied on aggregate, the lower-placed team was relegated to Serie C, unless the teams finished tied on points after the regular season, in which case the winner was decided by extra time and a penalty shoot-out if necessary.

Team 1	Agg.	Team 2	1st leg	2nd leg
Cosenza	4–0	Brescia	1–0	3–0

=== First leg ===
25 May 2023	Cosenza	1–0	Brescia	Cosenza
20:30 CEST (UTC+2)	Nasti 70'	Report		Stadium: San Vito-Gigi Marulla; Attendance: 14,201; Referee: Gianluca Aureliano

=== Second leg ===
1 June 2023	Brescia	0–3 (awd.) (0–4 agg.)	Cosenza	Brescia
20:30 CEST (UTC+2)	Bisoli 74'	Report	Meroni 90+5'	Stadium: Mario Rigamonti; Attendance: 15,235; Referee: Davide Massa
Note: The match was suspended at the 90+7th minute following throwings of smoke bombs by Brescia's supporters with still about one minute to play. Around 30 minutes after the suspension, the match was ended without being resumed.

== Season statistics ==
=== Top goalscorers ===
Rank	Player	Club	Goals
1	(Peru) Gianluca Lapadula^{4}	Cagliari	25
2	(Finland) Joel Pohjanpalo	Venezia	19
3	(Italy) Matteo Brunori	Palermo	17
3	(Morocco) Walid Cheddira	Bari	17
5	(Italy) Samuele Mulattieri	Frosinone	12
6	(Italy) Mirko Antonucci	Cittadella	11
6	(Iceland) Albert Guðmundsson	Genoa	11
6	(Argentina) Franco Vázquez	Parma	11
9	(Italy) Massimo Coda	Genoa	10
9	(Italy) Davide Diaw	Modena	10
9	(Italy) Ettore Gliozzi	Pisa	10

Note

^{4} Player scored 4 goals in the play-offs.

=== Hat-tricks ===
Player	Club	Against	Result	Date
(Ivory Coast) Cedric Gondo	Ascoli	Palermo	3–2 (A)	27 August 2022
(Finland) Joel Pohjanpalo^{4}	Venezia	Modena	5–0 (H)	1 May 2023

Note

^{4} Player scored four goals ; (H) – Home (A) – Away

=== Clean sheets ===
Rank	Player	Club	Clean sheets	Game weeks
1	(Italy) Stefano Turati	Frosinone	20	1–2, 4, 6, 8, 10, 12–13, 16–17, 19, 22–24, 27–29, 32–34
2	(Spain) Josep Martínez	Genoa	17	2–3, 6–8, 20, 22, 24, 26–31, 33–35
2	(Italy) Giacomo Poluzzi^{2}	Südtirol	17	5, 7, 10, 17–18, 20–21, 23, 25, 27, 29–30, 34–36
4	(Serbia) Boris Radunović^{2}	Cagliari	16	4–5, 8, 19–21, 24, 26–27, 30, 32–33, 36, 38
5	(Italy) Elia Caprile^{1}	Bari	15	5–6, 11, 15–16, 18, 20, 26–29, 31–32, 37
6	(Italy) Antony Iannarilli	Ternana	13	2, 6–8, 11–13, 16–17, 20, 23, 27, 30
7	(Italy) Stefano Gori	Perugia	11	2, 5, 14–16, 19, 22–23, 25, 27, 30
7	(Albania) Elhan Kastrati	Cittadella	11	4–5, 9–12, 15, 21, 23, 27, 31
9	(Italy) Enrico Alfonso	SPAL	10	3, 5, 9–10, 12, 16, 18, 20, 26, 34
9	(Italy) Simone Colombi	Reggina	10	3–6, 8, 15, 17–19, 32
9	(Italy) Riccardo Gagno	Modena	10	7, 12, 19, 21, 23–24, 29, 31–32, 34
9	(Italy) Mirko Pigliacelli	Palermo	10	1, 5, 10–12, 15–16, 21, 27, 32

Note

^{1}Player kept 1 clean sheet in the play-offs.
^{2}Player kept 2 clean sheets in the play-offs.

== Awards ==
=== Monthly ===
Month	MVP of the Month		Ref
September	(Morocco) Walid Cheddira	Bari	
October	(Italy) Massimo Coda	Genoa	
November	(Italy) Luigi Canotto	Reggina	
December	(Italy) Samuele Mulattieri	Frosinone	
January	(Italy) Matteo Brunori	Palermo	
February	(Italy) Giovanni Crociata	Cittadella	
March	(Peru) Gianluca Lapadula	Cagliari	
April	(Finland) Joel Pohjanpalo	Venezia	
May	(Finland) Joel Pohjanpalo	Venezia	

=== Annual ===
Award	Winner	Club	Ref
MVP of the season	(Peru) Gianluca Lapadula	Cagliari	
Play-offs MVP	(Italy) Leonardo Pavoletti	Cagliari	

== Attendances ==
#	Football club	Home games	Average attendance
1	Genoa CFC	19	25,940
2	SSC Bari	19	24,057
3	Palermo FC	19	20,389
4	Cagliari Calcio	19	13,563
5	Frosinone Calcio	19	11,322
6	Reggina 1914	19	11,159
7	Parma Calcio 1913	19	10,752
8	Modena FC	19	10,079
9	SPAL	19	8,618
10	Pisa SC	19	7,969
11	Benevento Calcio	19	7,955
12	Ascoli Calcio	19	7,219
13	AC Perugia	19	6,125
14	Cosenza Calcio	19	6,034
15	Ternana Calcio	19	5,554
16	Brescia Calcio	19	5,214
17	Como 1907	19	4,802
18	Venezia FC	19	4,532
19	FC Südtirol	19	4,427
20	AS Cittadella	19	3,502
