= Zaffaroni =

Zaffaroni is an Italian surname. Notable people with the surname include:

- Alejandro Zaffaroni (1923–2014), Uruguayan-American businessman
- Marco Zaffaroni (born 1969), Italian footballer and manager
- Raúl Zaffaroni (born 1940), Argentine supreme court justice
