= Luciano Foschi =

Italian footballer and manager

Personal information
- Date of birth: 3 July 1967 (age 59)
- Place of birth: Albano Laziale, Italy
- Position: Defender

Youth career
- 1985–1986: Lazio

Senior career*
Years	Team	Apps	(Gls)
1986–1987	Rondinella	11	(0)
1987–1988	Lazio	1	(0)
1988–1989	Virescit Boccaleone	15	(0)
1989–1990	Oltrepò	23	(0)
1990–1991	Fasano	25	(5)
1991–1992	Olbia	37	(5)
1992–1993	Rimini	34	(7)
1993–1994	Crevalcore	30	(3)
1994–1996	Lecco	66	(8)
1996–1999	Viterbese	84	(4)
1999–2000	Castel San Pietro	31	(8)
2000–2001	Cremonese	22	(2)
2001–2002	Olbia	12	(3)

Managerial career
- 2001–2002: Olbia
- 2002–2004: Novara
- 2004: Ancona
- 2004–2005: Teramo
- 2005–2006: Reggiana
- 2007–2008: Torres
- 2009: Alessandria
- 2010–2011: Savona
- 2014: Pordenone
- 2016–2017: Renate
- 2018: Livorno
- 2018–2020: Ravenna
- 2021: Carpi
- 2022–2023: Lecco
- 2024–2026: Renate
- * Club domestic league appearances and goals

Luciano Foschi (born 3 July 1967) is an Italian football manager and former player.

== Playing career ==
As a player, Foschi made his debut in the 1985-1986 football season as a defender for S.S. Lazio. He played then for the most of his career in Serie C2, winning two championships with A.C. Crevalcore in 1994 and with Viterbese in 1999.

== Coaching career ==
As a coach, he won the Serie D championship with Olbia Calcio in 2002 and led Novara Calcio to promotion to Serie C1 in 2003. He lately trained U.S. Alessandria in Lega Pro Seconda Divisione 2008–09 and in Lega Pro Prima Divisione 2009–10.

He was dismissed by Livorno on 8 April 2018.

On 4 June 2018, he was appointed as a manager of Ravenna. He was dismissed by Ravenna on 28 June 2020.

On 21 January 2021 he was named new head coach of Carpi. On 11 February 2021 he resigned himself.

On 21 September 2022, he was confirmed as the new head coach of Serie C club Lecco, and he led the club to promotion to the second tier via the playoffs.

On 9 October 2023, following a negative start in the club's 2023–24 Serie B campaign with only one point in six games, Foschi was dismissed from his position. On 2 July 2024, after resolving his contract with Lecco, Foschi signed a two-year deal with Serie C club Renate.
