= William Viali =

Italian footballer and manager

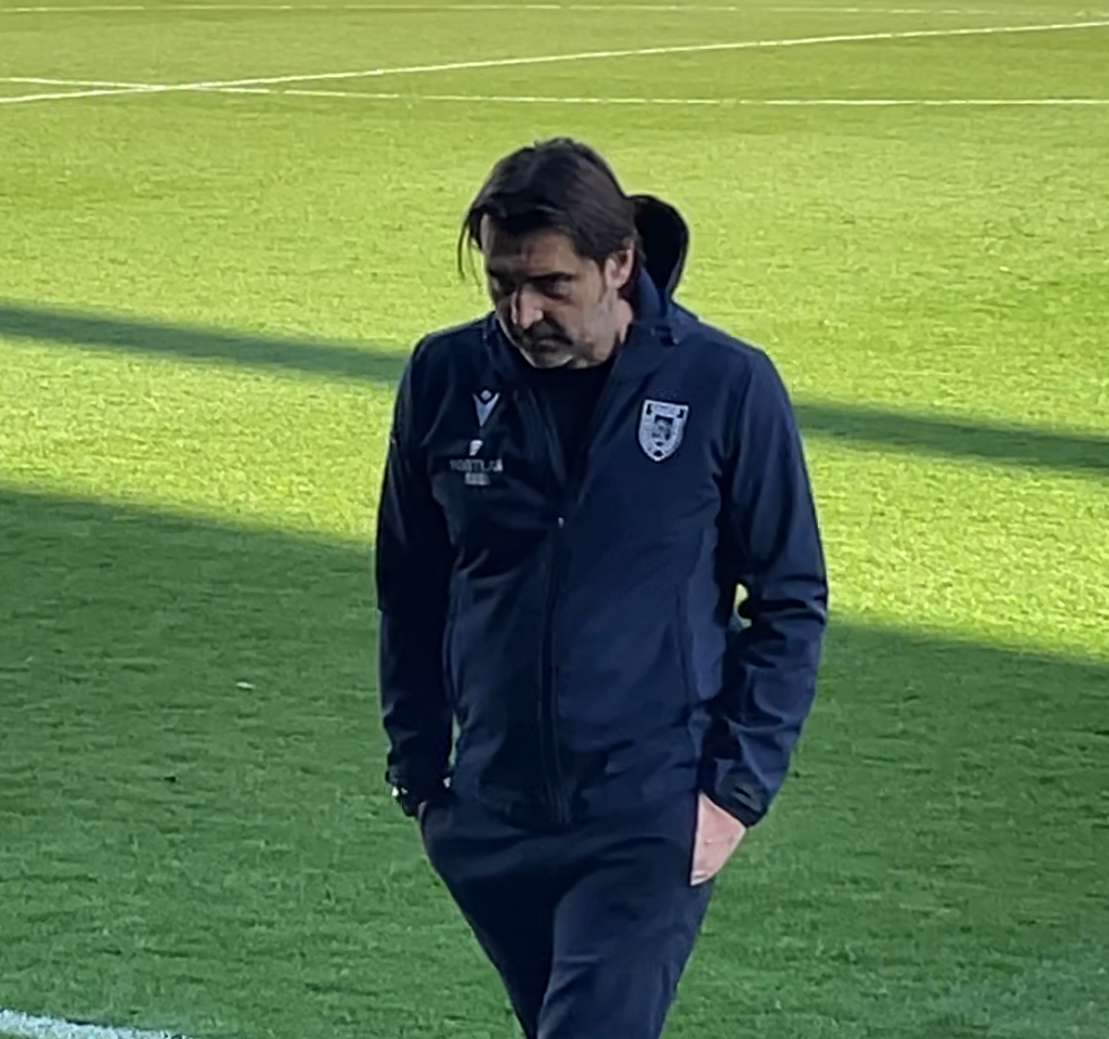
- Viali in 2025

Personal information
- Full name: William Viali
- Date of birth: 16 November 1974 (age 51)
- Place of birth: Vaprio d'Adda, Italy
- Height: 1.85 m (6 ft 1 in)
- Position: Defender

Youth career
- 1991–1993: Atalanta

Senior career*
Years	Team	Apps	(Gls)
1993–1994	Fiorenzuola	29	(1)
1994–1995	Ravenna	26	(1)
1995	Cesena	3	(0)
1995–1996	Monza	13	(0)
1996–1997	Ascoli	28	(2)
1997–2001	Lecce	111	(4)
2001–2002	Venezia	15	(0)
2002–2003	Palermo	0	(0)
2002–2003	→ Perugia (loan)	11	(0)
2003	→ Ancona (loan)	13	(1)
2004–2006	Fiorentina	53	(1)
2005–2006	→ Treviso (loan)	26	(0)
2006–2007	Treviso	56	(3)
2008–2010	Cremonese	71	(5)

Managerial career
- 2010–2011: Fiorenzuola
- 2012: Parma U16
- 2012–2013: Lupa Piacenza
- 2013: Piacenza
- 2014: Piacenza
- 2015–2016: Pro Piacenza
- 2016–2017: Südtirol
- 2017–2018: Cuneo
- 2018–2019: Novara
- 2019: Novara
- 2020–2022: Cesena
- 2022–2023: Cosenza
- 2023: Ascoli
- 2024: Cosenza
- 2024–2025: Reggiana
- * Club domestic league appearances and goals

William Viali (born 16 November 1974) is an Italian football manager and a former player who played as a defender. He was most recently the head coach of Serie C Group B club Reggiana.

== Playing career ==
Viali was signed outright by Treviso in January 2006. He finished his career with Cremonese in 2010.

== Coaching career ==
Having been released in 2010 by Cremonese and having decided to retire, Viali became coach of Serie D side Fiorenzuola. After leading the club away from relegation, Viali left the club in 2011. In 2012, Parma announced Viali had become the head coach of their under-16 team.

On 5 December 2017, he was hired as the head coach of Serie C club Cuneo.

On 14 June 2018, he was appointed the new head coach for Novara, which was relegated to Serie C at the end of the previous season.

On 4 June 2019, Novara announced that his contract would not be extended past its expiration on 30 June 2019.

On 28 January 2020, he joined Serie C club Cesena. He left Cesena by the end of the 2021–22 Serie C season.

On 2 November 2022, Viali signed a contract until 30 June 2023 to become the new head coach of Serie B club Cosenza to replace Davide Dionigi, in what was also his first managerial job in the Italian second division. He left Cosenza by the end of the season to sign for fellow Serie B club Ascoli, but was dismissed on 13 November 2023 due to poor results, after achieving only twelve points in the first 13 league games of the season.

On 11 March 2024, Viali returned to Cosenza, agreeing to a contract with the Serie B club until 30 June 2025. He departed the club by the end of the 2023–24 Serie B campaign after the club chose not to confirm him for the new season. On 19 June 2024, Viali was unveiled as the new head coach of fellow Serie B club Reggiana for the 2024–25 season.

== Honours ==
Lupa Piacenza

- Eccellenza Emilia–Romagna (1): 2012–13
