= Marco Zaffaroni =

Italian footballer and manager

Personal information
- Date of birth: 20 January 1969 (age 57)
- Place of birth: Milan, Italy
- Height: 1.93 m (6 ft 4 in)
- Position: Defender

Team information
- Current team: AlbinoLeffe (head coach)

Youth career
- 1985–1986: Saronno
- 1987–1989: Torino

Senior career*
Years	Team	Apps	(Gls)
1986–1987	Saronno	30	(1)
1987–1989	Torino	0	(0)
1989–1990	Casarano	34	(4)
1990–1993	Taranto	88	(1)
1993–1995	Solbiatese	49	(3)
1995–1998	Legnano	93	(24)
1998–2000	Saronno	66	(7)
2000–2004	Pro Patria	131	(12)
2004–2008	Monza	128	(3)
2008–2009	Turate	29	(4)
Total		648	(59)

Managerial career
- 2009–2010: Perugia (assistant)
- 2009: Perugia (caretaker)
- 2010–2011: Folgore Verano
- 2011–2013: Folgore Caratese
- 2013–2016: Caronnese
- 2016–2018: Monza
- 2019–2021: AlbinoLeffe
- 2021: Chievo
- 2021: Cosenza
- 2022–2023: Hellas Verona
- 2023–2024: Feralpisalò
- 2024: Südtirol
- 2026–: AlbinoLeffe
- * Club domestic league appearances and goals

Marco Zaffaroni (born 20 January 1969) is an Italian football manager and former player, who played predominantly as a defender. He is the head coach of Serie C Group A club AlbinoLeffe.

== Coaching career ==
On 24 June 2019, he was appointed head coach of Serie C club AlbinoLeffe.

Following the club's positive campaign in the 2020–21 Serie C playoffs, Zaffaroni was subsequently hired as Chievo's head coach for the 2021–22 Serie B season. However, after the club's exclusion from professional football, he left for Cosenza, the club that was admitted to fill Chievo's vacancy in the Italian second division. He was fired by Cosenza on 6 December 2021 after the club gained 1 point in 6 games and dropped to 16th place.

On 3 December 2022, Zaffaroni was hired as the new head coach of Serie A relegation-battling club Verona, with outgoing caretaker Salvatore Bocchetti as his assistant.

Despite guiding Verona to escape relegation in the season's final game, Zaffaroni was not confirmed in charge of the club. On 23 October 2023, Zaffaroni was appointed in charge of relegation-struggling Serie B club Feralpisalò, replacing Stefano Vecchi on a contract until the end of the season. Feralpisalò was relegated and Zaffaroni left the club in May 2024.

On 4 November 2024, Zaffaroni was hired as the new head coach of Serie B club Südtirol, replacing Federico Valente. He was dismissed just a month later, on 7 December 2024, after amassing four consecutive defeats.

== Managerial statistics ==
As of match played 28 October 2023

Managerial record by team and tenure
Team	Nat	From	To	Record							
Team	Nat	From	To	G	W	D	L	GF	GA	GD	Win %
Perugia (caretaker)	(Italy)	16 November 2009	28 December 2009	5	3	1	1	8	7	+1	60.00
Folgore Verano	(Italy)	1 July 2010	30 June 2011	36	17	10	9	57	33	+24	47.22
Folgore Caratese	(Italy)	9 July 2011	6 February 2013	63	21	19	23	81	66	+15	33.33
Caronnese	(Italy)	17 June 2013	24 May 2016	119	65	34	20	201	96	+105	54.62
Monza	(Italy)	24 May 2016	22 October 2018	89	49	21	19	128	58	+70	55.06
AlbinoLeffe	(Italy)	24 June 2019	23 June 2021	78	30	27	21	87	72	+15	38.46
Chievo	(Italy)	9 July 2021	3 August 2021	0	0	0	0	0	0	+0	—
Cosenza	(Italy)	7 August 2021	6 December 2021	17	4	3	10	14	30	−16	23.53
Hellas Verona	(Italy)	3 December 2022	30 June 2023	24	7	8	9	22	31	−9	29.17
Feralpisalò	(Italy)	23 October 2023	30 June 2024	1	0	0	1	0	3	−3	0.00
Total				431	196	122	113	597	395	+202	45.48

== Honours ==
=== Manager ===
Monza

- Serie D: 2016-17
- Scudetto Dilettanti: 2016-17
