= Federico Valente =

Italian footballer and coach

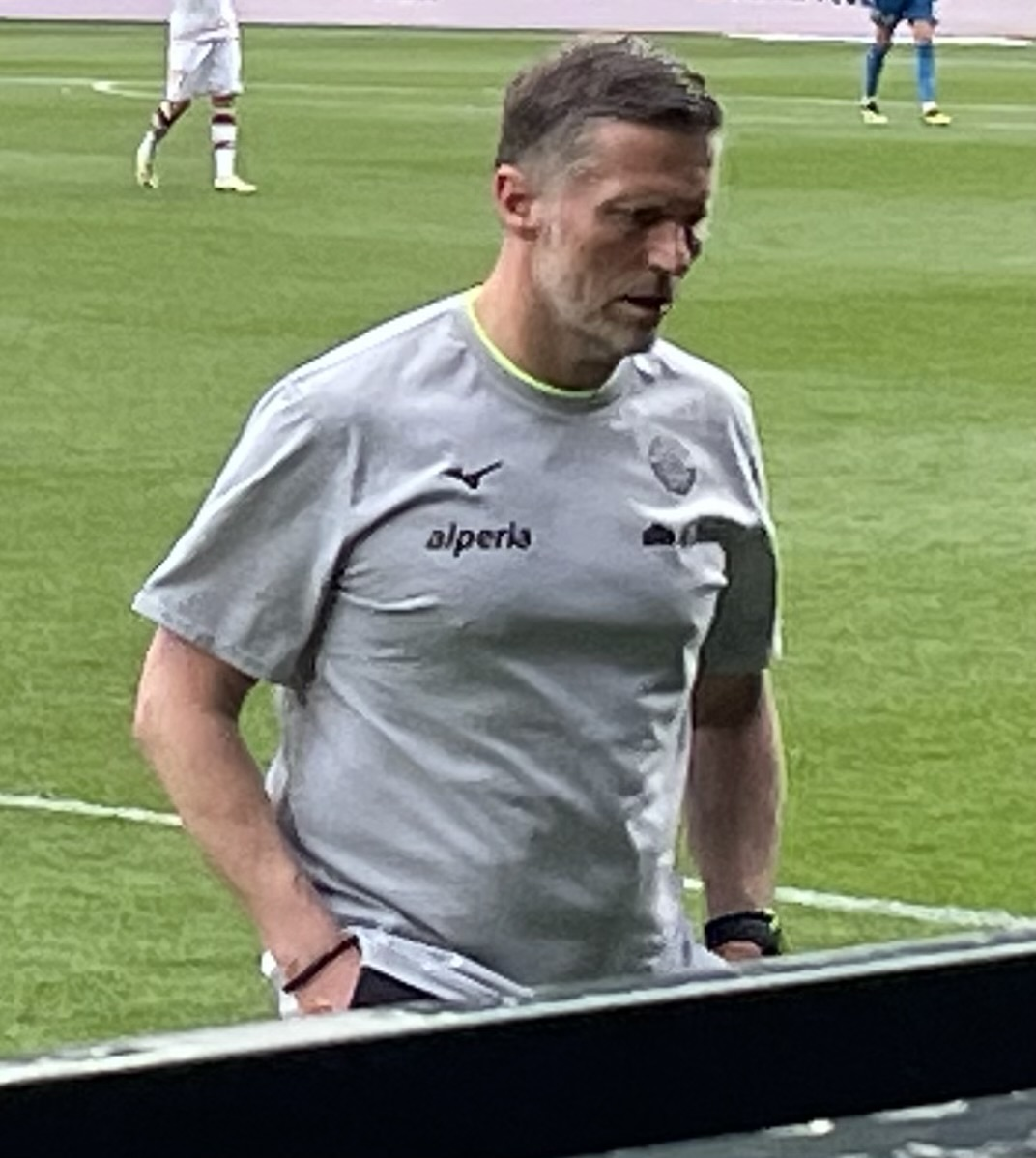
- 2024

Personal information
- Full name: Federico Valente
- Date of birth: 20 July 1975 (age 51)
- Place of birth: Solothurn, Switzerland
- Position: Goalkeeper

Team information
- Current team: Lecco (head coach)

Senior career*
Years	Team	Apps	(Gls)
1995	Utzenstorf		
1995–1997	Burgdorf		
1997–1998	Olten		
1998–2001	FC Thun		
2001–2002	FC Aarau		
2002–2003	FC Wohlen		
2003–2004	FC Grenchen		
2004–2005	FC Herzogenbuchsee		
2005–2006	Wolfwil		
2006–2011	Würenlos		

Managerial career
- 2010–2011: Würenlos
- 2023–2024: Südtirol
- 2025–: Lecco
- * Club domestic league appearances and goals

Federico Valente (born 20 July 1975) is a Swiss-Italian professional football coach and a former player, currently in charge of Italian Serie C Group A club Lecco.

== Playing career ==
Born in Solothurn to Italian parents from Sibari, he played his entire career in Switzerland as a goalkeeper for a number of minor league teams, among which FC Thun and FC Aarau.

== Coaching career ==
After a brief stint as player-coach for Würenlos, Valente took on a coaching career in the youth tiers of Swiss football. In 2012, he took on a UEFA A licence.

From 2013 to 2017, he worked as a youth coach and match analyst for FC Zürich. He then left to join SC Freiburg as a youth coach, being promoted in charge of the Under-19s in 2021, having the chance to work alongside first team head coach Christian Streich during this period.

In June 2023, Valente left Switzerland to join FC Südtirol as their Under-19 coach. Later in December, he was promoted to head coach in charge of the Serie B first team following the dismissal of Pierpaolo Bisoli. Under his guidance, Südtirol ended the season in a comfortable mid-table placement.

On 14 June 2024, one day after being awarded a UEFA Pro licence by the Swiss football federation, Valente was formally confirmed in charge of the FC Südtirol first team for one more season. On 4 November 2024, Südtirol announced the dismissal of Valente from his managerial duties with immediate effect.

On 5 February 2025, Valente was unveiled as the new head coach of Serie C club Lecco.
