= Michele Mignani =

Italian footballer and manager

Personal information
- Date of birth: 30 April 1972 (age 54)
- Place of birth: Genoa, Italy
- Height: 1.76 m (5 ft 9 in)
- Position: Defender

Team information
- Current team: Catanzaro (head coach)

Senior career*
Years	Team	Apps	(Gls)
1990–1991	Sampdoria	1	(0)
1991–1993	SPAL	42	(1)
1993–1994	Monza	16	(0)
1994–1995	Pistoiese	31	(2)
1995–1996	Lucchese	26	(0)
1996–2005	Siena	240	(6)
1997	→ Castel di Sangro (loan)	12	(0)
2006–2007	Triestina	35	(2)
2007–2008	Grosseto	29	(0)
2008–2009	Poggibonsi		

International career
1992–1993	Italy U21	6	(0)

Managerial career
- 2016–2017: Olbia
- 2017–2019: Siena
- 2019–2021: Modena
- 2021–2023: Bari
- 2024: Palermo
- 2024–2026: Cesena
- 2026–: Catanzaro
- * Club domestic league appearances and goals

Michele Mignani (born 30 April 1972) is an Italian professional football manager and former footballer who is the head coach of Serie B club Catanzaro.

== Playing career ==
Mignani made his Serie A debut on 13 January 1991 against U.S. Lecce. He then went on to spend ten seasons with Siena, serving as the team captain during the club's first Serie A campaign and being one of the mainstays for the Tuscans. He left in 2006, and Siena retired his #4 jersey number as an homage.

== Coaching career ==
He retired in 2009 to return to Siena as a youth coach, initially for the Allievi Nazionali and, since 2010, for the primary youth team, the Primavera under-19 squad.

He then served as head coach of Olbia for the club's 2016–17 Lega Pro campaign, but he was relieved of his managerial duties on 5 March 2017 following a string of six consecutive losses.

On 25 November 2019 he was hired by Serie C club Modena.

After two seasons in charge of Modena, Mignani left to join Serie C fallen giants Bari, which he successfully guided to win the title and subsequent return to Serie B. He was sacked in October 2023 after a series of poor results.

On 3 April 2024, Mignani was appointed in charge of Serie B promotion hopefuls Palermo. After completing the regular season in sixth place and then losing to Venezia in the promotion playoff semifinals, Palermo announced Mignani's departure on 6 June 2024. On 20 June 2024, Mignani signed for newly promoted Serie B club Cesena on a two-year contract.

On 25 October 2026, Serie B club Catanzaro announced that it had appointed Mignani as their new head coach in place of Giorgio Gorgone.

== Managerial statistics ==
As of 24 May 2024

Managerial record by team and tenure
Team	Nat	From	To	Record							
Team	Nat	From	To	G	W	D	L	GF	GA	GD	Win %
Olbia	(Italy)	8 January 2016	5 March 2017	48	21	11	16	66	62	+4	43.75
Siena	(Italy)	1 June 2017	20 May 2019	84	39	25	20	110	86	+24	46.43
Modena	(Italy)	25 November 2019	17 June 2021	53	28	9	16	64	42	+22	52.83
Bari	(Italy)	17 June 2021	9 October 2023	94	43	32	19	131	85	+46	45.74
Palermo	(Italy)	3 April 2024	30 June 2024	10	2	4	4	10	11	−1	20.00
Total				289	133	81	75	381	286	+95	46.02

== Honours ==
=== Managerial ===
Bari

- Serie C: 2021–22 (Group C)
