= Pierpaolo Bisoli =

Italian football manager (born 1966)

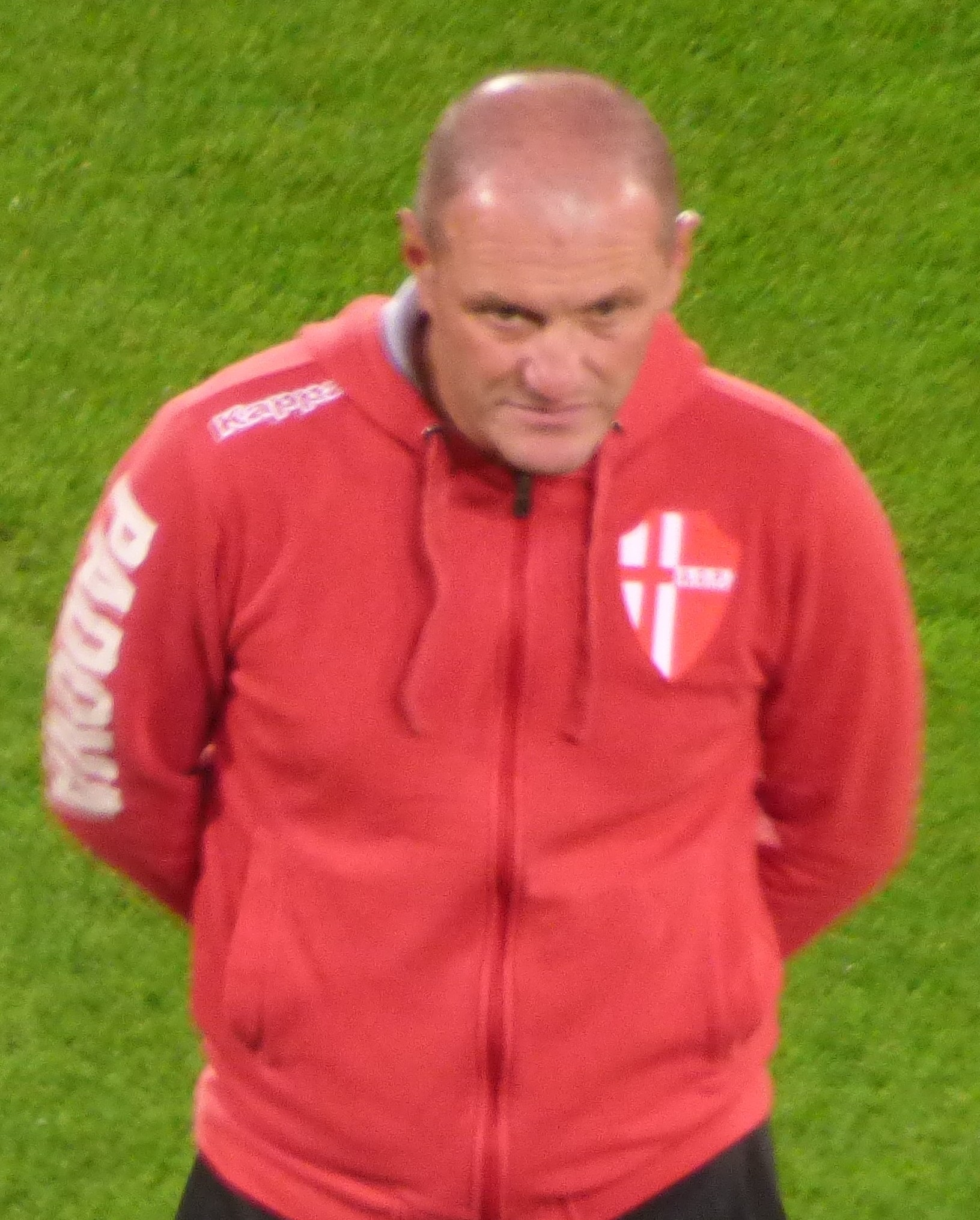
- Bisoli in 2019

Personal information
- Date of birth: 20 November 1966 (age 59)
- Place of birth: Porretta Terme, Italy
- Height: 1.82 m (6 ft 0 in)
- Position: Midfielder

Team information
- Current team: Pistoiese (head coach)

Senior career*
Years	Team	Apps	(Gls)
1984–1987	Pistoiese	66	(3)
1987–1988	Alessandria	33	(4)
1988–1989	Arezzo	34	(3)
1989–1991	Viareggio	67	(8)
1991–1997	Cagliari	167	(5)
1997–1999	Empoli	41	(0)
1999–2000	Perugia	32	(0)
2000–2001	Brescia	32	(2)
2001–2002	Pistoiese	28	(1)
2002–2003	Porretta		

Managerial career
- 2005–2007: Prato
- 2007–2008: Foligno
- 2008–2010: Cesena
- 2010: Cagliari
- 2011: Bologna
- 2012–2014: Cesena
- 2015–2016: Perugia
- 2016–2017: Vicenza
- 2017–2018: Padova
- 2018–2019: Padova
- 2020–2021: Cremonese
- 2022: Cosenza
- 2022–2023: Südtirol
- 2024: Modena
- 2024–2025: Brescia
- 2026: Reggiana
- 2026–: Pistoiese
- * Club domestic league appearances and goals

Pierpaolo Bisoli (born 20 November 1966) is an Italian football manager and former midfielder who is the head coach of Serie D club Pistoiese.

== Playing career ==
Born in Porretta Terme, Bisoli started his professional career in 1984 with Pistoiese, where he spent a total of three seasons. He then played for a handful of minor teams before joining Cagliari in 1991, becoming a mainstay for the Sardinians. He spent six seasons for the rossoblu, marking a total of 167 appearances and also taking part in the club's 1994–95 UEFA Cup stint. In 1997, he moved to newly promoted Serie A team Empoli, where he played for two seasons. He then played for Perugia, Brescia and Pistoiese before retiring in 2003 after a season with amateur hometown club Porretta.

== Coaching career ==
Following his retirement from active football, Bisoli accepted an assistant coaching role at Fiorentina, working alongside head coach Emiliano Mondonico during the 2004–05 season. He then became head coach of Serie C2 team Prato, where he worked for two seasons. From 2007, he was the head coach of the newly promoted Serie C1 side Foligno, where he surprisingly won a promotion playoff spot in his first season with the club and then achieved a promotion playoff spot in his second season with the Umbrian minnows. From July 2008, he has been the head coach of Cesena in the former Serie C1, now rebranded as Lega Pro Prima Divisione, managing to guide the bianconeri to win the league title in his first season in charge of the club.

He was confirmed head coach of Cesena also for the 2009–10 season, which proved to be very successful as the club from Romagna joined the race for direct promotion to Serie A, a league Cesena has not played in since 1991. He ultimately guided Cesena to a historical promotion in the final game of the season after the Bianconeri from Romagna ended the league in second place, thus ending a 19-year absence from the top flight for his club. He left Cesena at the end of the season to join his former club Cagliari, agreeing a contract with the Sardinian Serie A club. His experience at Cagliari as a head coach, however, proved to be highly unsuccessful, and he was ultimately dismissed on 15 November 2010 after a 0–1 home loss that left the Sardinians in 19th place.

On 26 May 2011, Bisoli was named as the new coach of Bologna, but he was sacked on 4 October 2011, with the club the bottom of the table and replaced by Stefano Pioli.

On 11 September 2012, he was named new coach of Cesena en place of the sacked Nicola Campedelli. In the 2013–14 Serie B he successfully led Cesena to triumph in the promotion playoff and back to the top flight. He was however dismissed on 8 December 2014 due to poor results, with Cesena deep in the relegation zone.

He was subsequently appointed as head coach of Serie C club Padova for the 2017–18 season, during which he led the club to win the league title and direct promotion to Serie B. Confirmed for the following campaign in the Italian second tier, he was successively sacked on 6 November 2018 due to poor results. He was reinstated as the head coach of Padova on 28 December 2018.

He was named head coach of struggling Serie B club Cremonese on 5 March 2020 and successively confirmed for the 2020–21 Serie B season after guiding the team to safety. However, he was sacked on 7 January 2021 due to poor results.

On 17 February 2022, he was unveiled as the new head coach of Serie B club Cosenza until the end of the season. On 15 June 2022, after guiding them to safety, Cosenza announced that Bisoli will not continue coaching the club.

On 29 August 2022, Bisoli was announced as the new head coach of newly-promoted Serie B club Südtirol. After guiding Südtirol to an impressive season and a spot in the promotion playoffs, he was confirmed in charge of the club for the 2023–24 Serie B season, during which he failed to maintain the club in the higher positions of the league table. He was sacked on 4 December 2023 following a 0–1 home loss to Como, leaving Südtirol in 13th place.

On 14 April 2024, Bisoli signed for Serie B club Modena, agreeing on a contract until 30 June 2025. He was dismissed on 4 November 2024, with Modena second to bottom in the Serie B league.

On 9 December 2024, Bisoli was hired as the new head coach of Serie B club Brescia, the team being captained by his son Dimitri.

On 23 March 2026, Bisoli was unveiled as the new head coach of relegation-threatened Serie B club Reggiana until the end of the season.

== Personal life ==
Pierpaolo has a son Dimitri Bisoli, who is a professional footballer.

== Managerial statistics ==
As of match played 5 March 2023

Managerial record by team and tenure
Team	Nat	From	To	Record							
Team	Nat	From	To	G	W	D	L	GF	GA	GD	Win %
Prato	(Italy)	29 July 2005	14 June 2007	85	24	30	31	83	94	−11	28.24
Foligno	(Italy)	14 June 2007	4 June 2008	42	20	13	9	48	36	+12	47.62
Cesena	(Italy)	6 June 2008	23 June 2010	84	39	25	20	107	67	+40	46.43
Cagliari	(Italy)	23 June 2010	15 November 2010	13	3	5	5	14	11	+3	23.08
Bologna	(Italy)	26 May 2011	4 October 2011	6	1	1	4	4	11	−7	16.67
Cesena	(Italy)	11 September 2012	8 December 2014	104	35	35	34	114	121	−7	33.65
Perugia	(Italy)	5 June 2015	24 May 2016	44	15	13	16	43	43	+0	34.09
Vicenza	(Italy)	3 October 2016	18 April 2017	29	7	11	11	24	31	−7	24.14
Padova	(Italy)	21 June 2017	6 November 2018	54	24	17	13	72	52	+20	44.44
Padova	(Italy)	28 December 2018	17 March 2019	11	2	6	3	9	8	+1	18.18
Cremonese	(Italy)	5 March 2020	7 January 2021	31	10	10	11	35	35	+0	32.26
Cosenza	(Italy)	17 February 2022	15 June 2022	17	5	4	8	20	25	−5	29.41
Südtirol	(Italy)	29 August 2022	4 December 2023	25	12	11	2	31	20	+11	48.00
Career Total				545	197	181	167	604	554	+50	36.15
