= Antonio Pergreffi =

Italian footballer (born 1988)

Personal information
- Date of birth: 6 May 1988 (age 38)
- Place of birth: Bergamo, Italy
- Height: 1.89 m (6 ft 2 in)
- Position: Centre back

Senior career*
Years	Team	Apps	(Gls)
2014–2015	Pontisola	30	(1)
2015–2016	Lecco	36	(5)
2016–2020	Piacenza	125	(9)
2020–2026	Modena	125	(7)
- * Club domestic league appearances and goals

Antonio Pergreffi (born 6 May 1988) is an Italian former professional footballer who played as a centre back.

== Club career ==
On 16 July 2015, he joined Serie D club Lecco.

After one year in Lecco, on 7 July 2016 Pergreffi signed with Serie C club Piacenza. He played four seasons on Serie C for the club, he was also the team captain.

On 6 June 2020, he signed with Modena.
