= 2026–27 Serie B =

Serie B
- Season: 2026–27
- Dates: 21 August 2026 – 14 May 2027
- Matches: 110
- Goals: 287 (2.61 per match)
- Top goalscorer: Cristian Shpendi (8 goals)
- Biggest home win: Hellas Verona 5–0 Arezzo (6 September 2026)
- Biggest away win: Catanzaro 1–6 Ascoli (24 October 2026)
- Highest scoring: Catanzaro 1–6 Ascoli (24 October 2026)
- Longest winning run: Palermo (4 games)
- Longest unbeaten run: Palermo (11 games)
- Longest winless run: Empoli (8 games)
- Longest losing run: Carrese; Catanzaro; Empoli; Padova; Sampdoria; Vicenza (3 games)
- Highest attendance: 33,009; Palermo 3–1 Sampdoria (7 September 2026)
- Lowest attendance: 2,218; Virtus Entella 1–2 Cesena (29 August 2026)
- All statistics correct as of 8 November 2026.

The 2026–27 Serie B (known as the Serie BKT for sponsorship reasons) will be the 95th season of the second tier of Italian football, Serie B, since its establishment in 1929. The season will commence on 21 August 2026 and will end on 16 May 2027.

== Teams ==
=== Team changes ===
The following teams have changed divisions since the 2025–26 season:

==== To Serie B ====
Relegated from Serie A

- Cremonese
- Hellas Verona
- Pisa

Promoted from Serie C

- Vicenza (Group A)
- Arezzo (Group B)
- Benevento (Group C)
- Ascoli (Play-off winners)

==== From Serie B ====
Promoted to Serie A

- Venezia
- Frosinone
- Monza (Play-off winners)

Relegated to Serie C

- Bari (Play-out losers)
- Reggiana
- Spezia
- Pescara

Pisa, Hellas Verona and Cremonese return to Serie B after one, seven and one years respectively.

Vicenza, Arezzo, Benevento and Ascoli return to Serie B after four, nineteen, three and two years respectively.

Venezia, Frosinone and Monza return to Serie A after one, two and one years respectively.

Pescara, Spezia, Reggiana and Bari return to Serie C after one, fourteen, three and four years respectively.

Fifteen clubs are former Serie A members, while five teams are seeking their first promotion ever.

=== Number of teams by regions ===
| No. of teams | Region | Team(s) |
|---|---|---|
| 4 | Tuscany | Arezzo, Carrarese, Empoli and Pisa |
| 3 | Campania | Avellino, Benevento and Juve Stabia |
| 3 | Veneto | Padova, Hellas Verona and Vicenza |
| 2 | Emilia-Romagna | Cesena and Modena |
| 2 | Liguria | Sampdoria and Virtus Entella |
| 2 | Lombardy | Cremonese and Mantova |
| 1 | Calabria | Catanzaro |
| 1 | Marche | Ascoli |
| 1 | Sicily | Palermo |
| 1 | Trentino-Alto Adige/Südtirol | Südtirol |

Locations of the 2026-27 Serie B teams

=== Stadiums and locations ===
| Team | Location | Stadium | Capacity |
|---|---|---|---|
| Arezzo | Arezzo | Stadio Città di Arezzo | 13,128 |
| Ascoli | Ascoli Piceno | Stadio Cino e Lillo Del Duca | 12,461 |
| Avellino | Avellino | Stadio Partenio-Adriano Lombardi | 26,000 |
| Benevento | Benevento | Stadio Ciro Vigorito | 16,867 |
| Carrarese | Carrara | Stadio dei Marmi | 4,194 |
| Catanzaro | Catanzaro | Stadio Nicola Ceravolo | 14,650 |
| Cesena | Cesena | Stadio Dino Manuzzi | 20,194 |
| Cremonese | Cremona | Stadio Giovanni Zini | 20,641 |
| Empoli | Empoli | Stadio Carlo Castellani | 16,284 |
| Hellas Verona | Verona | Stadio Marcantonio Bentegodi | 39,211 |
| Juve Stabia | Castellammare di Stabia | Stadio Comunale Romeo Menti | 7,642 |
| Mantova | Mantua | Stadio Danilo Martelli | 14,884 |
| Modena | Modena | Stadio Alberto Braglia | 21,151 |
| Padova | Padua | Stadio Comunale Euganeo | 32,420 |
| Palermo | Palermo | Stadio Renzo Barbera | 36,365 |
| Pisa | Pisa | Arena Garibaldi | 12,508 |
| Sampdoria | Genoa | Stadio Luigi Ferraris | 33,205 |
| Südtirol | Bolzano | Stadio Marco Druso | 5,539 |
| Vicenza | Vicenza | Stadio Romeo Menti | 12,000 |
| Virtus Entella | Chiavari | Stadio Comunale | 5,535 |

=== Personnel and kits ===
| Team | Manager | Captain | Kit manufacturer | Shirt sponsor(s) | |
| Team | Manager | Captain | Kit manufacturer | Main | Other(s) |
|---|---|---|---|---|---|
| Arezzo | (Italy) Cristian Bucchi | (Italy) Marco Chiosa | Rever | UnoAErre | List: Front: None; Back: Novart Gioielli; Sleeves: Gimet Brass; Shorts: Uno Informatica |
| Ascoli | (Italy) Francesco Tomei | (Argentina) Marcos Curado | Hummel | Fainplast | List: Front: None; Back: Pulitissima; Sleeves: Sara Servizi; Shorts: Sofer Carpenterie |
| Avellino | (Italy) Alessandro Nesta | (Italy) Luca Palmiero | Magma | Provincia di Avellino | List: Front: Cosmopol SpA; Back: Mi.Ba. Infissi; Sleeves: Ecoservice Srl; Shorts: Soft Tecnology |
| Benevento | (Italy) Antonio Floro Flores | (Italy) Mattia Maita | Nike | IVPC | List: Front: Rillo Costruzioni, La Molisana; Back: Cantina del Taburno; Sleeves: Consorzio Stabile Medil; Shorts: Multiservice. Srl |
| Carrarese | (Italy) Guido Pagliuca | (Italy) Marco Imperiale | Givova | Sagevan | List: Front: None; Back: FuturEnergy; Sleeves: BM Srl; Shorts: VA.ILA. Tende |
| Catanzaro | (Italy) Michele Mignani | (Italy) Pietro Iemmello | EYE Sport | Coop | List: Front: Acqua Fabrizia; Back: Principe Srl; Sleeves: Elettrotek Srl; Shorts: 958 Santero |
| Cesena | (Italy) Alessandro Diamanti | (Italy) Andrea Ciofi | Macron | Amadori | List: Front: None; Back: Nolpal; Sleeves: F.P. Trasmissioni; Shorts: None |
| Cremonese | (Italy) Fabio Pecchia | (Italy) Matteo Bianchetti | Acerbis | Ilta Inox (Home) / Arinox (Away) | List: Front: Acciaieria Arvedi, Arvedi Tubi Acciaio; Back: Feraboli Lubrificanti; Sleeves: A2A; Shorts: None |
| Empoli | (Italy) Matteo Andreoletti | (Italy) Luca Magnino | Kappa | Computer Gross | List: Front: Kühner Motorini e Alternatori; Back: Pediatrica; Sleeves: Sammontana; Shorts: AQ Italy |
| Hellas Verona | (Italy) Marco Baroni | (Faroe Islands) Andrias Edmundsson | Joma | Aircash | List: Front: None; Back: VetroCar; Sleeves: Fastbet.news (Away); Shorts: None |
| Juve Stabia | (Italy) Pietro De Giorgio | (Italy) Leonardo Candellone | Adidas / Givova | Guerri Energia / None | List: Front: Automec; Back: DS Glass; Sleeves: HDI Assicurazioni; Shorts: None |
| Mantova | (Italy) Francesco Modesto | (Italy) Simone Trimboli | Adidas | Sinergy Luce e Gas | List: Front: PATA Snack; Back: Compra e Vinci Emozioni; Sleeves: Trinità Salumi; Shorts: Parolini Giannantonio |
| Modena | (Italy) Daniele Galloppa | (Argentina) Leandro Chichizola | New Balance | Kerakoll | List: Front: Annovi Reverberi; Back: Reflexallen; Sleeves: None; Shorts: Studio Appari |
| Padova | (Italy) Antonio Calabro | (Italy) Matteo Lovato | Macron | Acciaierie Venete | List: Front: None; Back: None; Sleeves: Amazing Thailand; Shorts: GioloCenter |
| Palermo | (Italy) Filippo Inzaghi | (Italy) Mattia Bani | Puma | Sicily by Car | List: Front: None; Back: Etihad Airways; Sleeves: DAZN Bet Club; Shorts: Supermercati Decò |
| Pisa | (Italy) Paolo Bianco | (Italy) Antonio Caracciolo | Adidas | Cetilar | List: Front: None; Back: DAZN Bet Club; Sleeves: Aurora Catering Pisa; Shorts: Toni Luigi Scavi e Demolizioni |
| Sampdoria | (Italy) Luca D'Angelo | (Italy) Alex Ferrari | Macron | illimity Banca Ifis | List: Front: None; Back: Idee per Viaggiare; Sleeves: Sogeco International; Shorts: FuturEnergy |
| Südtirol | (Italy) Davide Possanzini | (Italy) Fabian Tait | Erreà | Südtirol | List: Front: Duka Shower (Home) / Alperia (Away); Back: Racines-Giovo (Away); Sleeves: Alperia (Home) / Duka Shower (Away); Shorts: None |
| Vicenza | (Italy) Fabio Gallo | (Italy) Filippo Costa | Hummel | Diesel | List: Front: Acciaierie Venete, Aon (Home); Back: Nardi Outdoor (Home) / Ipermercati Emisfero (Away); Sleeves: OMIS Italia; Shorts: Univer2000 |
| Virtus Entella | (Italy) Andrea Chiappella | (Italy) Luca Parodi | Adidas | Duferco Energia | List: Front: None; Back: Visit Portofino; Sleeves: MyJet Europe; Shorts: Thermo Cappotti |

=== Managerial changes ===
| Team | Outgoing manager | Manner of departure | Date of vacancy | Position in table | Incoming manager | Date of appointment |
|---|---|---|---|---|---|---|
| Sampdoria | (Italy) Attilio Lombardo | End of caretaker spell | 10 May 2026 | Pre-season | (Italy) Bernardo Corradi | 25 June 2026 |
| Avellino | (Italy) Davide Ballardini | End of contract | 16 May 2026 | Pre-season | (Italy) Alessandro Nesta | 1 July 2026 |
| Modena | (Italy) Andrea Sottil | Sacked | 22 May 2026 | Pre-season | (Italy) Daniele Galloppa | 13 June 2026 |
| Hellas Verona | (Italy) Paolo Sammarco | End of interim spell | 24 May 2026 | Pre-season | (Italy) Marco Baroni | 19 June 2026 |
| Pisa | (Sweden) Oscar Hiljemark | Sacked | 8 June 2026 | Pre-season | (Italy) Paolo Bianco | 22 June 2026 |
| Carrarese | (Italy) Antonio Calabro | Mutual consent | 9 June 2026 | Pre-season | (Italy) Gabriele Cioffi | 15 June 2026 |
| Catanzaro | (Italy) Alberto Aquilani | Mutual consent | 11 June 2026 | Pre-season | (Italy) Giorgio Gorgone | 11 July 2026 |
| Padova | (Italy) Roberto Breda | End of contract | 11 June 2026 | Pre-season | (Italy) Antonio Calabro | 13 June 2026 |
| Juve Stabia | (Italy) Ignazio Abate | Mutual consent | 12 June 2026 | Pre-season | (Italy) Pietro De Giorgio | 3 July 2026 |
| Südtirol | (Italy) Fabrizio Castori | Sacked | 23 June 2026 | Pre-season | (Italy) Davide Possanzini | 24 June 2026 |
| Cesena | (England) Ashley Cole | End of contract | 30 June 2026 | Pre-season | (Italy) Alessandro Diamanti | 1 July 2026 |
| Empoli | (Italy) Fabio Caserta | End of contract | 30 June 2026 | Pre-season | (Italy) Guido Pagliuca | 6 July 2026 |
| Cremonese | (Italy) Marco Giampaolo | Sacked | 1 September 2026 | 20th | (Italy) Fabio Pecchia | 2 September 2026 |
| Empoli | (Italy) Guido Pagliuca | Sacked | 28 September 2026 | 12th | (Italy) Matteo Andreoletti | 30 September 2026 |
| Carrarese | (Italy) Gabriele Cioffi | Sacked | 29 September 2026 | 20th | (Italy) Guido Pagliuca | 30 September 2026 |
| Sampdoria | (Italy) Bernardo Corradi | Sacked | 19 October 2026 | 20th | (Italy) Luca D'Angelo | 22 October 2026 |
| Catanzaro | (Italy) Giorgio Gorgone | Sacked | 24 October 2026 | 20th | (Italy) Michele Mignani | 25 October 2026 |

== League table ==
| Pos | Team | Pld | W | D | L | GF | GA | GD | Pts | Qualification or relegation |
|---|---|---|---|---|---|---|---|---|---|---|
| 1 | Palermo | 12 | 8 | 3 | 1 | 26 | 16 | +10 | 27 | Promotion to Serie A |
| 2 | Modena | 12 | 8 | 2 | 2 | 22 | 10 | +12 | 26 | Promotion to Serie A |
| 3 | Ascoli | 12 | 5 | 6 | 1 | 19 | 9 | +10 | 21 | Qualification for the promotion play-offs semi-finals |
| 4 | Avellino | 12 | 5 | 4 | 3 | 20 | 12 | +8 | 19 | Qualification for the promotion play-offs semi-finals |
| 5 | Pisa | 12 | 5 | 4 | 3 | 21 | 17 | +4 | 19 | Qualification for the promotion play-offs quarter-finals |
| 6 | Mantova | 12 | 5 | 4 | 3 | 16 | 15 | +1 | 19 | Qualification for the promotion play-offs quarter-finals |
| 7 | Südtirol | 12 | 4 | 6 | 2 | 14 | 12 | +2 | 18 | Qualification for the promotion play-offs quarter-finals |
| 8 | Cesena | 12 | 4 | 6 | 2 | 14 | 14 | 0 | 18 | Qualification for the promotion play-offs quarter-finals |
| 9 | Hellas Verona | 12 | 4 | 4 | 4 | 19 | 15 | +4 | 16 | |
| 10 | Benevento | 12 | 4 | 4 | 4 | 16 | 14 | +2 | 16 | |
| 11 | Padova | 12 | 4 | 4 | 4 | 13 | 14 | −1 | 16 | |
| 12 | Cremonese | 12 | 4 | 3 | 5 | 14 | 13 | +1 | 15 | |
| 13 | Sampdoria | 12 | 4 | 2 | 6 | 14 | 19 | −5 | 14 | |
| 14 | Carrarese | 12 | 4 | 1 | 7 | 10 | 14 | −4 | 13 | |
| 15 | Juve Stabia | 12 | 4 | 4 | 4 | 12 | 13 | −1 | 12 (Note: Juve Stabia were deducted 2 points for administrative and financial irregularities and a further 2 points for tax payment irregularities.) | |
| 16 | Arezzo | 12 | 3 | 3 | 6 | 10 | 21 | −11 | 12 | Qualification for the relegation play-out |
| 17 | Virtus Entella | 12 | 2 | 4 | 6 | 11 | 15 | −4 | 10 | Qualification for the relegation play-out |
| 18 | Vicenza | 12 | 2 | 4 | 6 | 16 | 26 | −10 | 10 | Relegation to Serie C |
| 19 | Empoli | 12 | 2 | 3 | 7 | 12 | 20 | −8 | 9 | Relegation to Serie C |
| 20 | Catanzaro | 12 | 2 | 3 | 7 | 14 | 24 | −10 | 9 | Relegation to Serie C |

Updated to match(es) played on 22 November 2026. Source: Serie B
Rules for classification: 1) Points; 2) Head-to-head points; 3) Head-to-head goal difference; 4) Goal difference; 5) Goals scored; 6) Draw.

== Results ==
| Home \ Away | ARE | ASC | AVE | BEN | CAR | CTZ | CES | CRE | EMP | VER | JST | MAN | MOD | PAD | PAL | PIS | SAM | SÜD | VIC | ENT |
|---|---|---|---|---|---|---|---|---|---|---|---|---|---|---|---|---|---|---|---|---|
| Arezzo | — | 0–0 | | 0–3 | a | | | 0–0 | a | | | | | 1–1 | 2–3 | a | | 1–4 | | |
| Ascoli | | — | 3–1 | 1–0 | 1–1 | | | | 1–1 | | | | | | 1–1 | | 2–0 | | 2–2 | |
| Avellino | 1–2 | | — | | | | | | | | a | 4–1 | | 0–1 | 1–1 | 2–0 | 4–1 | | 3–0 | |
| Benevento | | | 1–1 | — | | 1–1 | 2–0 | | | 3–1 | | | 1–2 | | | | | 1–1 | 2–2 | |
| Carrarese | 2–1 | | | 0–1 | — | | | | 0–1 | | | 1–2 | 2–1 | | | a | 0–1 | | | 1–0 |
| Catanzaro | | 1–6 | | | 1–0 | — | | | | | | 1–3 | | 1–1 | 3–1 | | | | | |
| Cesena | | | 1–1 | | | 1–0 | — | 2–2 | 2–1 | | | 1–1 | a | | | | 1–1 | | | |
| Cremonese | | | | 2–0 | | | | — | | | 0–1 | a | 0–3 | 3–1 | | | | | | 0–0 |
| Empoli | 0–1 | | | | a | | | 1–0 | — | | 2–2 | | | | 2–4 | 0–1 | | | 0–2 | |
| Hellas Verona | 5–0 | 1–2 | | | 3–0 | 2–2 | 0–2 | | | — | | a | | | | 1–1 | | | 2–1 | |
| Juve Stabia | 1–0 | | a | | | | 1–1 | | | 0–1 | — | | | | | 0–3 | | 3–0 | | |
| Mantova | | | | | | | | 0–2 | 3–1 | 0–0 | | — | | | 0–2 | 2–2 | 2–0 | | | |
| Modena | | | 0–1 | | | | 3–0 | | 2–1 | 3–2 | 2–0 | 1–1 | — | | | | | | | |
| Padova | | 1–0 | | | 0–2 | | | | 2–2 | 1–1 | | | | — | | | | 2–0 | | 1–2 |
| Palermo | | | | | 2–1 | | | | | | 1–0 | | | 2–1 | — | | 3–1 | | 3–1 | |
| Pisa | a | | | | a | 2–1 | | 3–1 | a | | | | | 0–1 | 3–3 | — | | 2–2 | | 1–4 |
| Sampdoria | 1–2 | | | 3–1 | | 2–1 | | | | | 1–2 | | | | | | — | | | 2–0 |
| Südtirol | | 0–0 | | | | 2–0 | 1–1 | 1–0 | | | | | 1–1 | | | | 1–1 | — | | 1–0 |
| Vicenza | | | | | | 3–2 | | 1–4 | | a | 1–1 | | 1–2 | | | 0–3 | | | — | |
| Virtus Entella | | | 1–1 | | | | 1–2 | | | | 1–1 | 0–1 | 0–2 | | | | | | 2–2 | — |

Updated to match(es) played on 22 November 2026. Source: Serie B
Legend: Blue = home team win; Yellow = draw; Red = away team win.
For upcoming matches, an "a" indicates there is an article about the rivalry between the two participants.

== Promotion play-offs ==
=== Format ===
- Preliminary round: the higher-placed team played at home. If teams are tied after regular time, extra-time was played. If scores are still level, the higher-placed team advanced;
- Semi-finals: the higher-placed team played at home for the second leg. If teams were tied on aggregate, the higher-placed team advanced;
- Final: the higher-placed team played at home for the second leg. If teams were tied on aggregate, the higher-placed team was promoted to Serie A, unless the teams finished tied on points after the regular season, in which case the winner was decided by extra time and a penalty shoot-out if necessary.

Preliminary round
5 | TBC
8 | TBC
6 | TBC
7 | TBC

Semi-finals
Lowest-seeded eliminators winner
4 | TBC
Highest-seeded eliminators winner
3 | TBC

Final
Winner of semi-final 1
Winner of semi-final 2

== Relegation play-out ==
=== Format ===
The relegation play-offs (play-out in Italian) were contested over two legs between the teams finishing 16th and 17th in the regular season. The higher-placed team hosted the second leg.

If the teams were level on aggregate score, the lower-placed team in the regular season standings was relegated to Serie C. However, if the two teams finished tied on points in the regular season, extra time and, if necessary, a penalty shoot-out were used to determine the winner.

| Team 1 | Agg. | Team 2 | 1st leg | 2nd leg |
|---|---|---|---|---|
| TBC | | TBC | | |

== Season statistics ==
As of matches played 8 November 2026

=== Top goalscorers ===
| Rank | Player | Club | Goals |
|---|---|---|---|
| 1 | (Albania) Cristian Shpendi | Cesena | 8 |
| 2 | (Italy) Andrea Belotti | Modena | 7 |
| 2 | (Italy) Antonio Di Nardo | Juve Stabia | 7 |
| 2 | (Norway) Dennis Johnsen | Palermo | 7 |
| 2 | (Colombia) Daniel Mosquera | Hellas Verona | 7 |
| 6 | (Italy) Federico Bonazzoli | Cremonese | 6 |
| 6 | (Italy) Dominic Vavassori | Palermo | 6 |
| 8 | (Italy) Francesco Ruocco | Mantova | 5 |
| 8 | (Italy) Raffaele Russo | Avellino | 5 |
| 10 | (Italy) Filippo Pittarello | Catanzaro / Pisa | 4 |
| 10 | (Italy) Edoardo Saporiti | Empoli | 4 |
| 10 | (Greece) Antonis Siatounis | Benevento | 4 |
| 10 | (Italy) Andrea Silipo | Ascoli | 4 |

=== Clean sheets ===
| Rank | Player | Club | Clean sheets |
|---|---|---|---|
| 1 | (Italy) Alessandro Sorrentino | Padova | 4 |
| 1 | (Italy) Samuele Vitale | Ascoli | 4 |
| 3 | (Italy) Francesco Bardi | Mantova | 3 |
| 3 | (Argentina) Leandro Chichizola | Modena | 3 |
| 3 | (Italy) Andrea Fulignati | Cremonese | 3 |
| 3 | (Italy) Tommaso Martinelli | Avellino | 3 |
| 3 | (Italy) Alessandro Nunziante | Arezzo | 3 |
| 3 | (Italy) Simone Perilli | Hellas Verona | 3 |
| 3 | (Italy) Alessandro Plizzari | Südtirol | 3 |
| 3 | (Italy) Gianmarco Vannucchi | Benevento | 3 |
| 3 | (Croatia) Ante Vuković | Juve Stabia | 3 |

=== Discipline ===
==== Player ====
- Most yellow cards: 5
  - (Italy) Arturo Calabresi (Pisa)
  - (Italy) Manuel Cicconi (Sampdoria)
  - (Italy) Giovanni Giunti (Padova)
  - (Burkina Faso) Abdoul Guiebre (Ascoli)
  - (Ivory Coast) Christian Kouan (Benevento)
  - (Italy) Luca Magnino (Empoli)
- Most red cards: 2
  - (Italy) Marco Curto (Empoli)

==== Club ====
- Most yellow cards: 29
  - Benevento
- Most red cards: 4
  - Empoli
- Fewest yellow cards: 15
  - Juve Stabia
- Fewest red cards: 0
  - Ascoli
  - Avellino
  - Carrarese
  - Catanzaro
  - Juve Stabia
  - Mantova
  - Modena
  - Palermo
  - Vicenza

== Awards ==
=== Monthly ===
| Month | MVP of the Month | | Ref |
|---|---|---|---|
| September | (Albania) Cristian Shpendi | Cesena | |
