= 2025–26 Serie B =

Serie B
- Season: 2025–26
- Dates: Regular season: 22 August 2025 – 8 May 2026; Play-offs: 12 May 2026 – 29 May 2026
- Champions: Venezia (3rd title)
- Promoted: Venezia; Frosinone; Monza (via play-off)
- Relegated: Bari (via play-out); Reggiana; Spezia; Pescara
- Matches: 380
- Goals: 973 (2.56 per match)
- Top goalscorer: Joel Pohjanpalo (24+1 goals)
- Biggest home win: Palermo 5–0 Pescara (1 November 2025); Empoli 5–0 Bari (29 November 2025); Palermo 5–0 Carrarese (29 November 2025); Spezia 6–1 Südtirol (18 April 2026)
- Biggest away win: Mantova 1–5 Frosinone (September 2025); Avellino 0–4 Spezia (25 October 2025); Cesena 0–4 Venezia (25 October 2025)
- Highest scoring: Carrarese 3–4 Avellino (21 September 2025); Avellino 4–3 Reggiana (1 November 2025); Mantova 2–5 Venezia (24 January 2026)
- Longest winning run: Venezia (8 matches)
- Longest unbeaten run: Frosinone; Palermo (14 matches)
- Longest winless run: Südtirol (13 matches)
- Longest losing run: Reggiana (6 matches)
- Highest attendance: 32,922; Palermo 1–1 Modena (19 October 2025)
- Lowest attendance: 1,591; Virtus Entella 3–1 Cesena (10 February 2026)
- Attendance: 3,590,923 (9,450 per match)

The 2025–26 Serie B (known as the Serie BKT for sponsorship reasons) was the 94th season of the second tier of Italian football, Serie B, since its establishment in 1929. The season commenced on 22 August 2025 and ended on 8 May 2026.

== Teams ==
=== Team changes ===
The following teams have changed divisions since the 2024–25 season:

==== To Serie B ====
Relegated from Serie A

- Empoli
- Venezia
- Monza

Promoted from Serie C

- Padova (Group A)
- Avellino (Group C)
- Virtus Entella (Group B)
- Pescara (Play-off winners)

==== From Serie B ====
Promoted to Serie A

- Sassuolo
- Pisa
- Cremonese (Play-off winners)

Relegated to Serie C

- Salernitana
- Brescia (excluded)
- Cittadella
- Cosenza

Padova, Virtus Entella, Avellino, and Pescara (via the play-offs) return to Serie B after six, four, seven, and four years, respectively.

Monza, Venezia and Empoli were relegated back to Serie B after three, one and four years in the top flight, respectively.

Cosenza, Cittadella, Brescia and Salernitana were relegated back to the third level after six, nine, forty and eleven years, respectively.

Sassuolo, Pisa and Cremonese are promoted to the top flight after one, thirty four and two years respectively.

Locations of the 2025–26 Serie B teams

=== Number of teams by regions ===
No. of teams	Region	Team(s)
3
3	Emilia-Romagna	Cesena, Modena and Reggiana
3	Liguria	Sampdoria, Spezia and Virtus Entella
2
2	Campania	Avellino and Juve Stabia
2	Lombardy	Mantova and Monza
2	Tuscany	Carrarese and Empoli
2	Veneto	Padova and Venezia
1
1	Abruzzo	Pescara
1	Apulia	Bari
1	Calabria	Catanzaro
1	Lazio	Frosinone
1	Sicily	Palermo
1	Trentino-Alto Adige/Südtirol	Südtirol

=== Stadiums and locations ===
Team	Location	Stadium	Capacity
Avellino	Avellino	Stadio Partenio-Adriano Lombardi	26,000
Bari	Bari	Stadio Comunale San Nicola	58,270
Carrarese	Carrara	Stadio dei Marmi - IV Olimpionici Azzurri	4,194
Catanzaro	Catanzaro	Stadio Nicola Ceravolo	14,650
Cesena	Cesena	Orogel Stadium - Dino Manuzzi	20,194
Empoli	Empoli	Stadio Carlo Castellani – Computer Gross Arena	16,284
Frosinone	Frosinone	Stadio Benito Stirpe	16,227
Juve Stabia	Castellammare di Stabia	Stadio Comunale Romeo Menti	7,642
Mantova	Mantua	Stadio Danilo Martelli	14,884
Modena	Modena	Stadio Alberto Braglia	21,151
Monza	Monza	U-Power Stadium	17,102
Padova	Padua	Stadio Comunale Euganeo	32,420
Palermo	Palermo	Stadio Renzo Barbera	36,365
Pescara	Pescara	Stadio Adriatico – Giovanni Cornacchia	20,476
Reggiana	Reggio Emilia	MAPEI Stadium - Città del Tricolore	21,525
Sampdoria	Genoa	Stadio Comunale Luigi Ferraris	33,205
Spezia	La Spezia	Stadio Alberto Picco	12,273
Südtirol	Bolzano	Stadio Marco Druso	5,539
Venezia	Venice	Stadio Pier Luigi Penzo	12,048
Virtus Entella	Chiavari	Stadio Enrico Sannazzari	5,587

=== Personnel and kits ===
Team	Manager	Captain	Kit manufacturer	Shirt sponsor(s)	
Team	Manager	Captain	Kit manufacturer	Main	Other(s)
Avellino	(Italy) Davide Ballardini	(Italy) Marco Armellino	Magma	Provincia di Avellino	List: Front: Cosmopol; Back: Mi.Ba. Porte e Finestre; Sleeves: Soft Tecnology; Shorts: Gruppo Marinelli
Bari	(Italy) Moreno Longo	(Italy) Raffaele Pucino	Erreà	Betsson.sport	List: Front: Acqua Santa Croce; Back: Centro Assistenza Bollette; Sleeves: Ventana Cinco; Shorts: Granoro
Carrarese	(Italy) Antonio Calabro	(Italy) Marco Imperiale	Givova	Sagevan	List: Front: None; Back: FuturEnergy; Sleeves: BM Srl; Shorts: None
Catanzaro	(Italy) Alberto Aquilani	(Italy) Pietro Iemmello	EYE Sport	Coop	List: Front: Volkswagen Bencivenni, Main Solution Energie Rinnovabili; Back: Principe Accessori; Sleeves: Banca di Credito Cooperativo della Calabria Ulteriore; Shorts: Fresco Sorriso
Cesena	(England) Ashley Cole	(Italy) Andrea Ciofi	Erreà	E.CO Energia Corrente	List: Front: None; Back: Amadori; Sleeves: 1 Attimo in Forma; Shorts: FS Costruzioni
Empoli	(Italy) Fabio Caserta	(Italy) Matteo Lovato	Kappa	Computer Gross (Home) / Kühner Motorini e Alternatori (Away)	List: Front: Elite Top Fight (Home) / Computer Gross (Away); Back: Pediatrica; Sleeves: Sammontana; Shorts: AQ Italy
Frosinone	(Italy) Massimiliano Alvini	(Italy) Riccardo Marchizza	Zeus	MeglioBanca	List: Front: 7Sette Carburanti; Back: Supermercati Dem; Sleeves: Cogein SpA; Shorts: None
Juve Stabia	(Italy) Ignazio Abate	(Italy) Leonardo Candellone	Givova	Guerri Energia	List: Front: FRIMM; Back: DS Glass; Sleeves: Bene Assicurazioni; Shorts: Oscar Petroli
Mantova	(Italy) Francesco Modesto	(Italy) Marco Festa	Adidas	Sinergy Luce e Gas	List: Front: PATA Snack; Back: Verodol CBD; Sleeves: Napoli Uno; Shorts: Trinità Salumi
Modena	(Italy) Andrea Sottil	(Italy) Fabio Gerli	New Balance	Kerakoll	List: Front: Annovi Reverberi; Back: Reflexallen; Sleeves: Wyler Vetta; Shorts: Studio Appari
Monza	(Italy) Paolo Bianco	(Italy) Matteo Pessina	Nike	Ford Pro	List: Front: ZeroPlayer; Back: Pulsee Luce e Gas; Sleeves: Sesto Polimedica; Shorts: La Dea Salumi
Padova	(Italy) Roberto Breda	(Argentina) Papu Gómez	Macron	Servizio Energetico Italiano / Gruppo Nazionale Energetico	List: Front: Facile.Energy / Power 4U; Back: Energetika; Sleeves: None; Shorts: Sirman
Palermo	(Italy) Filippo Inzaghi	(Italy) Mattia Bani	Puma	Sicily by Car	List: Front: None; Back: inX.aero; Sleeves: LT Costruzioni; Shorts: Supermercati Decò
Pescara	(Italy) Giorgio Gorgone	(Italy) Filippo Pellacani	Joma	Sapori dal Forno	List: Front: Betwin360, Astea Energia; Back: CATA GROUP; Sleeves: Abruzzo Airport; Shorts: Buiva Srl
Reggiana	(Italy) Pierpaolo Bisoli	(Italy) Paolo Rozzio	Macron	Immergas	List: Front: Righi Food, EA Group; Back: Fiat Autostile; Sleeves: Friggeri; Shorts: Olmedo Special Vehicles
Sampdoria	(Italy) Attilio Lombardo (caretaker)	(Italy) Alex Ferrari	Macron	Ifis Sport	List: Front: None; Back: Idee per Viaggiare; Sleeves: Sogeco International; Shorts: FuturEnergy
Spezia	(Italy) Luca D'Angelo	(Bulgaria) Petko Hristov	Kappa	Spigas Clienti / Segnoverde	List: Front: Dani Shipping; Back: None; Sleeves: Iozzelli Magazzini Edili; Shorts: None
Südtirol	(Italy) Fabrizio Castori	(Italy) Fabian Tait	Erreà	Südtirol	List: Front: Duka Shower; Back: TopHaus (Home) / Racines-Giovo (Away); Sleeves: Alperia; Shorts: None
Venezia	(Italy) Giovanni Stroppa	(Austria) Michael Svoboda	Nocta	Cynar Spritz	List: Front: None; Back: None; Sleeves: Salumificio Bechèr; Shorts: inX.aero
Virtus Entella	(Italy) Andrea Chiappella	(Italy) Luca Parodi	Adidas	Duferco Energia	List: Front: LaMiaLiguria; Back: K-Sport; Sleeves: Portofino Mare; Shorts: Thermo Cappotti

=== Managerial changes ===
Team	Outgoing manager	Manner of departure	Date of vacancy	Position in table	Incoming manager	Date of appointment
Monza	(Italy) Alessandro Nesta	End of contract	30 June 2025	Pre-season	(Italy) Paolo Bianco	1 July 2025
Frosinone	(Italy) Paolo Bianco	Signed by Monza	30 June 2025	Pre-season	(Italy) Massimiliano Alvini	2 July 2025
Catanzaro	(Italy) Fabio Caserta	Mutual consent	30 June 2025	Pre-season	(Italy) Alberto Aquilani	1 July 2025
Juve Stabia	(Italy) Guido Pagliuca	Mutual consent	30 June 2025	Pre-season	(Italy) Ignazio Abate	1 July 2025
Modena	(Italy) Paolo Mandelli	Appointed as Under-19 coach	30 June 2025	Pre-season	(Italy) Andrea Sottil	1 July 2025
Palermo	(Italy) Alessio Dionisi	Sacked	30 June 2025	Pre-season	(Italy) Filippo Inzaghi	1 July 2025
Empoli	(Italy) Roberto D'Aversa	Sacked	30 June 2025	Pre-season	(Italy) Guido Pagliuca	1 July 2025
Bari	(Italy) Moreno Longo	Sacked	30 June 2025	Pre-season	(Italy) Fabio Caserta	1 July 2025
Pescara	(Italy) Silvio Baldini	Resigned	19 June 2025	Pre-season	(Italy) Vincenzo Vivarini	2 July 2025
Virtus Entella	(Italy) Fabio Gallo	Mutual consent	30 June 2025	Pre-season	(Italy) Andrea Chiappella	3 July 2025
Venezia	(Italy) Eusebio Di Francesco	Mutual consent	30 June 2025	Pre-season	(Italy) Giovanni Stroppa	1 July 2025
Sampdoria	(Italy) Alberico Evani	End of contract	30 June 2025	Pre-season	(Italy) Massimo Donati	13 July 2025
Empoli	(Italy) Guido Pagliuca	Sacked	14 October 2025	12th	(Italy) Alessio Dionisi	16 October 2025
Sampdoria	(Italy) Massimo Donati	Sacked	18 October 2025	18th	(Italy) Angelo Gregucci	19 October 2025
Spezia	(Italy) Luca D'Angelo	Sacked	4 November 2025	19th	(Italy) Roberto Donadoni	4 November 2025
Pescara	(Italy) Vincenzo Vivarini	Sacked	11 November 2025	19th	(Italy) Giorgio Gorgone	12 November 2025
Bari	(Italy) Fabio Caserta	Sacked	26 November 2025	17th	(Italy) Vincenzo Vivarini	27 November 2025
Mantova	(Italy) Davide Possanzini	Sacked	15 December 2025	18th	(Italy) Francesco Modesto	15 December 2025
Bari	(Italy) Vincenzo Vivarini	Sacked	19 January 2026	19th	(Italy) Moreno Longo	19 January 2026
Reggiana	(Italy) Davide Dionigi	Sacked	8 February 2026	17th	(Italy) Lorenzo Rubinacci	8 February 2026
Avellino	(Italy) Raffaele Biancolino	Sacked	16 February 2026	14th	(Italy) Davide Ballardini	19 February 2026
Sampdoria	(Italy) Angelo Gregucci	Sacked	9 March 2026	15th	(Italy) Attilio Lombardo (caretaker)	9 March 2026
Empoli	(Italy) Alessio Dionisi	Sacked	10 March 2026	13th	(Italy) Fabio Caserta	10 March 2026
Cesena	(Italy) Michele Mignani	Sacked	14 March 2026	8th	(England) Ashley Cole	15 March 2026
Padova	(Italy) Matteo Andreoletti	Sacked	21 March 2026	13th	(Italy) Roberto Breda	23 March 2026
Reggiana	(Italy) Lorenzo Rubinacci	Sacked	23 March 2026	19th	(Italy) Pierpaolo Bisoli	23 March 2026
Spezia	(Italy) Roberto Donadoni	Mutual consent	23 March 2026	18th	(Italy) Luca D'Angelo	23 March 2026

== League table ==
Pos	Team	Pld	W	D	L	GF	GA	GD	Pts	Promotion, qualification or relegation
1	Venezia (C, P)	38	24	10	4	77	31	+46	82	Promotion to Serie A
2	Frosinone (P)	38	23	12	3	76	34	+42	81	Promotion to Serie A
3	Monza (O, P)	38	22	10	6	61	32	+29	76	Qualification for promotion play-offs semi-finals
4	Palermo	38	20	12	6	61	33	+28	72	Qualification for promotion play-offs semi-finals
5	Catanzaro	38	15	14	9	62	51	+11	59	Qualification for promotion play-offs preliminary round
6	Modena	38	15	10	13	49	36	+13	55	Qualification for promotion play-offs preliminary round
7	Juve Stabia	38	11	18	9	44	45	−1	51	Qualification for promotion play-offs preliminary round
8	Avellino	38	13	10	15	43	55	−12	49	Qualification for promotion play-offs preliminary round
9	Mantova	38	13	7	18	45	57	−12	46 (Note: Head-to-head points: Mantova 9, Padova 4, Cesena 4. Head-to-head goal difference: Padova −1, Cesena −3.)	
10	Padova	38	12	10	16	39	49	−10	46	
11	Cesena	38	12	10	16	45	56	−11	46	
12	Carrarese	38	10	14	14	47	52	−5	44 (Note: Carrarese finished ahead of Sampdoria on head-to-head goal difference: Sampdoria 3–2 Carrarese, Carrarese 2–0 Sampdoria.)	
13	Sampdoria	38	11	11	16	35	48	−13	44	
14	Virtus Entella	38	10	12	16	36	51	−15	42	
15	Empoli	38	9	14	15	47	54	−7	41	
16	Südtirol (O)	38	8	17	13	38	48	−10	41	Qualification for relegation play-out
17	Bari (R)	38	10	10	18	38	60	−22	40	Qualification for relegation play-out
18	Reggiana (R)	38	9	10	19	36	56	−20	37	Relegation to Serie C
19	Spezia (R)	38	8	11	19	43	59	−16	35 (Note: Spezia finished ahead of Pescara on head-to-head points: Spezia 2–1 Pescara, Pescara 1–1 Spezia.)	Relegation to Serie C
20	Pescara (R)	38	7	14	17	51	66	−15	35	Relegation to Serie C

Source: Serie BKT
Rules for classification: 1) Points; 2) Head-to-head points; 3) Head-to-head goal difference; 4) Goal difference; 5) Goals scored; 6) Draw.
(Note: Head-to-head record is used only after all the matches between the teams in question have been played)
(C) Champions; (O) Play-off winners; (P) Promoted; (R) Relegated

=== Positions by round ===
The table lists the positions of teams after each week of matches. In order to preserve chronological evolution, any postponed matches are not included in the round at which they were initially scheduled but added to the full round that was played immediately afterwards.

Team ╲ Round	1	2	3	4	5	6	7	8	9	10	11	12	13	14	15	16	17	18	19	20	21	22	23	24	25	26	27	28	29	30	31	32	33	34	35	36	37	38
Avellino	18	16	12	6	5	4	5	9	11	11	7	9	12	9	10	12	11	11	11	12	13	12	12	13	14	14	13	14	11	10	9	10	11	13	10	8	10	8
Bari	13	15	19	19	18	17	16	17	16	16	14	15	17	17	15	14	16	16	18	19	17	19	19	19	19	19	19	17	19	17	16	17	17	17	17	18	17	17
Carrarese	3	4	5	8	11	11	8	10	6	8	10	10	10	13	13	13	13	13	12	10	9	9	9	10	10	11	11	11	12	12	11	9	9	9	9	10	11	12
Catanzaro	9	13	13	14	12	12	14	15	15	12	8	11	11	8	7	7	7	5	5	7	8	8	6	5	5	5	5	5	5	5	5	5	5	5	5	5	5	5
Cesena	1	1	2	3	4	5	6	4	3	3	4	3	4	4	3	3	4	6	6	5	5	6	5	8	8	8	8	8	8	8	8	8	8	8	8	9	9	11
Empoli	2	10	9	16	15	15	12	13	14	13	16	13	8	7	8	10	8	9	8	9	10	11	11	12	11	10	12	12	13	13	14	12	14	15	15	16	14	15
Frosinone	4	5	4	4	2	1	3	3	5	4	3	4	3	2	1	1	1	1	1	1	1	2	3	2	2	3	3	3	3	3	3	2	2	3	3	3	2	2
Juve Stabia	10	14	14	7	8	6	9	7	7	9	12	7	9	10	11	8	9	8	9	8	7	7	7	6	7	7	7	7	7	7	7	7	7	7	7	7	7	7
Mantova	15	11	15	17	17	19	19	19	20	20	18	17	15	15	18	18	19	19	19	16	19	18	15	17	17	16	16	18	16	15	13	14	12	11	12	11	8	9
Modena	5	3	1	1	1	2	1	1	1	1	1	2	2	3	6	6	6	7	7	6	6	5	8	7	6	6	6	6	6	6	6	6	6	6	6	6	6	6
Monza	8	6	11	5	9	9	7	5	2	2	2	1	1	1	2	2	2	2	3	3	3	3	2	3	3	2	2	2	2	2	2	3	3	2	2	2	3	3
Padova	16	17	18	15	10	10	13	11	10	10	11	12	14	12	12	9	10	10	10	11	12	13	13	11	13	12	10	10	10	11	12	13	15	14	14	14	13	10
Palermo	6	7	3	2	3	3	2	2	4	6	5	6	6	6	5	5	5	4	4	4	4	4	4	4	4	4	4	4	4	4	4	4	4	4	4	4	4	4
Pescara	17	19	17	13	16	16	17	16	17	17	17	19	19	20	20	20	20	20	20	20	20	20	20	20	20	20	20	20	20	20	20	20	18	19	19	17	18	20
Reggiana	14	9	8	9	13	13	11	8	9	7	9	8	7	11	9	11	12	12	13	14	14	15	17	16	15	15	14	15	18	19	19	19	20	18	20	19	20	18
Sampdoria	19	20	20	20	20	20	18	18	19	19	20	20	18	19	19	19	17	14	16	17	18	14	14	14	12	13	15	13	15	14	15	15	13	12	13	12	12	13
Spezia	20	18	16	18	19	18	20	20	18	18	19	18	20	18	17	17	18	15	17	18	15	17	18	18	18	17	17	19	17	18	18	18	19	20	19	20	19	19
Südtirol	11	2	10	10	6	7	10	12	12	14	15	16	16	16	16	15	14	17	14	13	11	10	10	9	9	9	9	9	9	9	10	11	10	10	11	13	15	16
Venezia	7	8	6	11	7	8	4	6	8	5	6	5	5	5	4	4	3	3	2	2	2	1	1	1	1	1	1	1	1	1	1	1	1	1	1	1	1	1
Virtus Entella	12	12	7	12	14	14	15	14	13	15	13	14	13	14	14	16	15	18	15	15	16	16	16	15	16	18	18	16	14	16	17	16	16	16	16	15	16	14

Leader and promotion to Serie A
Promotion to Serie A
Promotion play-off semi-finals
Promotion play-off preliminary round
Relegation play-out
Relegation to Serie C

Source: WorldFootball.net

== Results ==
Home \ Away	AVE	BAR	CAR	CAT	CES	EMP	FRO	JST	MAN	MOD	MON	PAD	PAL	PES	REG	SAM	SPE	SUD	VEN	ENT
Avellino	—	2–0	1–2	1–1	3–1	0–3	1–3	0–0	0–0	1–0	2–1	1–0	2–2	0–1	4–3	2–1	0–4	3–2	1–1	2–0
Bari	1–1	—	0–3	1–2	1–0	2–1	2–3	0–1	1–0	3–1	1–1	2–1	0–3	1–1	4–1	1–1	0–0	1–2	0–3	2–0
Carrarese	3–4	1–0	—	3–3	0–0	3–0	0–2	3–0	0–0	0–0	0–1	0–0	0–1	2–2	0–0	2–0	3–1	0–0	3–2	3–1
Catanzaro	1–0	2–3	1–1	—	2–0	3–2	2–2	2–2	2–0	2–2	1–1	0–1	1–0	3–3	2–0	0–0	4–2	1–1	2–1	3–2
Cesena	3–0	1–2	2–1	3–1	—	0–1	2–2	1–1	3–2	1–0	1–3	3–4	1–1	2–0	1–2	0–0	2–3	1–1	0–4	1–1
Empoli	1–0	5–0	2–2	1–0	1–1	—	1–1	1–2	2–2	0–0	1–1	3–1	1–3	4–2	1–1	1–1	1–1	0–1	1–1	1–1
Frosinone	2–0	2–1	3–0	2–0	3–1	2–2	—	3–0	5–0	2–2	0–1	2–0	1–1	2–2	1–0	3–0	2–1	2–2	1–2	4–0
Juve Stabia	2–0	0–0	1–1	1–1	2–0	2–0	0–1	—	2–1	1–2	2–2	3–3	1–0	2–2	0–0	1–1	3–1	1–0	0–0	1–0
Mantova	0–2	2–1	1–1	1–3	3–0	0–1	1–5	2–0	—	1–3	3–2	1–0	1–1	2–1	0–1	2–1	4–1	1–1	2–5	1–0
Modena	1–1	3–0	2–0	1–2	0–0	2–1	1–2	3–0	2–1	—	1–2	1–2	0–0	2–1	2–1	1–2	3–0	0–0	1–2	2–0
Monza	2–1	2–0	4–1	2–1	1–0	2–2	2–2	2–1	1–0	1–0	—	0–1	3–0	3–0	3–1	1–0	1–0	1–1	1–1	2–0
Padova	2–2	1–1	1–0	1–3	1–1	1–0	0–1	2–2	1–2	2–0	1–2	—	0–1	1–0	1–0	1–1	2–2	1–1	0–2	2–1
Palermo	2–0	2–0	5–0	3–2	2–0	3–2	0–0	2–2	2–1	1–1	0–3	1–0	—	5–0	2–1	1–0	1–0	3–0	0–0	3–0
Pescara	1–1	4–0	2–2	0–2	1–3	4–0	1–2	1–1	2–2	0–2	0–2	0–1	2–1	—	2–1	1–2	1–1	1–1	2–2	3–0
Reggiana	1–1	3–1	2–0	2–2	1–2	3–1	0–1	1–1	1–0	1–0	0–0	1–2	1–1	1–3	—	1–0	1–1	0–4	1–3	0–0
Sampdoria	2–1	0–2	3–2	0–0	1–2	1–0	1–1	1–0	0–1	0–2	0–3	1–0	3–3	4–1	2–1	—	1–0	1–0	0–0	1–1
Spezia	1–0	1–1	0–2	0–0	1–2	1–1	0–2	1–3	0–2	0–2	4–2	1–1	1–2	2–1	0–1	1–0	—	6–1	2–2	1–1
Südtirol	0–1	0–0	1–1	2–1	0–1	1–2	1–3	1–1	0–3	1–1	0–0	3–0	0–2	0–0	3–1	3–1	2–1	—	1–1	0–1
Venezia	4–0	2–1	2–1	3–1	1–2	2–0	3–0	3–1	3–0	0–2	2–0	3–1	2–0	3–2	2–0	3–1	2–0	3–0	—	1–0
Virtus Entella	1–2	2–2	2–1	1–3	3–1	1–0	1–1	1–1	1–0	2–1	1–0	1–0	1–1	1–1	3–0	3–1	0–1	1–1	1–1	—

Source: Serie B (in Italian), Soccerway (in English)
Legend: Blue = home team win; Yellow = draw; Red = away team win.
For upcoming matches, an "a" indicates there is an article about the rivalry between the two participants.

== Promotion play-offs ==
=== Format ===
- Preliminary round: the higher-placed team played at home. If teams are tied after regular time, extra-time was played. If scores are still level, the higher-placed team advanced;
- Semi-finals: the higher-placed team played at home for the second leg. If teams were tied on aggregate, the higher-placed team advanced;
- Final: the higher-placed team played at home for the second leg. If teams were tied on aggregate, the higher-placed team was promoted to Serie A, unless the teams finished tied on points after the regular season, in which case the winner was decided by extra time and a penalty shoot-out if necessary.

Preliminary round
5	Catanzaro	3
8	Avellino	0
6	Modena	0
7	Juve Stabia	1

Semi-finals
5	Catanzaro	3	0	3
4	Palermo	0	2	2
7	Juve Stabia	2	1	3
3	Monza	2	2	4

Final
5	Catanzaro	0	2	2
3	Monza	2	0	2

=== Preliminary round ===
12 May 2026	Modena	0–1	Juve Stabia	Modena
18:45 CEST (UTC+2)		Report	Zeroli 86'	Stadium: Stadio Alberto Braglia; Attendance: 11,713; Referee: Francesco Fourneau

12 May 2026	Catanzaro	3−0	Avellino	Catanzaro
21:00 CEST (UTC+2)	Pontisso 41'; Cassandro 83'; Iemmello 90+3' (pen.)	Report		Stadium: Nicola Ceravolo; Attendance: 10,210; Referee: Livio Marinelli

=== Semi-finals ===
==== First leg ====
16 May 2026	Juve Stabia	2−2	Monza	Castellammare di Stabia
20:00 CEST (UTC+2)	Mosti 57'; Okoro 68'	Report	Carboni 77'; Delli Carri 89'	Stadium: Stadio Comunale Romeo Menti; Attendance: 3,986; Referee: Giovanni Ayroldi

17 May 2026	Catanzaro	3–0	Palermo	Catanzaro
20:00 CEST (UTC+2)	Iemmello 1', 15'; Liberali 41'	Report		Stadium: Nicola Ceravolo; Attendance: 8,400; Referee: Ermanno Feliciani

==== Second leg ====
19 May 2026	Monza	2−1 (4−3 agg.)	Juve Stabia	Monza
20:00 CEST (UTC+2)	Cutrone 85', 90+6'	Report	Burnete 90'	Stadium: U-Power Stadium; Attendance: 10,785; Referee: Maurizio Mariani

20 May 2026	Palermo	2−0 (2−3 agg.)	Catanzaro	Palermo
20:00 CEST (UTC+2)	Pohjanpalo 3'; Modesto 89'	Report		Stadium: Stadio Renzo Barbera; Attendance: 33,286; Referee: Matteo Marcenaro

=== Final ===
==== First leg ====
24 May 2026	Catanzaro	0–2	Monza	Catanzaro
20:00 CEST (UTC+2)		Report	Hernani 77'; Caso 89'	Stadium: Nicola Ceravolo; Attendance: 12,705; Referee: Matteo Marchetti

==== Second leg ====
29 May 2026	Monza	0–2 (2–2 agg.)	Catanzaro	Monza
20:00 CEST (UTC+2)		Report	Fellipe Jack 39'; Frosinini 78'	Stadium: U-Power Stadium; Attendance: 17,015; Referee: Davide Massa

The promotion play-off final ended 2–2 on aggregate. As Monza finished the regular season in a higher position than Catanzaro, Monza were promoted to Serie A, while Catanzaro remained in Serie B.

== Relegation play-out ==
=== Format ===
The relegation play-offs (play-out in Italian) were contested over two legs between the teams finishing 16th and 17th in the regular season. The higher-placed team hosted the second leg.

If the teams were level on aggregate score, the lower-placed team in the regular season standings was relegated to Serie C. However, if the two teams finished tied on points in the regular season, extra time and, if necessary, a penalty shoot-out were used to determine the winner.

Team 1	Agg.	Team 2	1st leg	2nd leg
Südtirol	0−0	Bari	0−0	0−0

=== First leg ===
15 May 2026	Bari	0−0	Südtirol	Bari
20:00 CEST (UTC+2)		Report		Stadium: Stadio Comunale San Nicola; Attendance: 9,303; Referee: Antonio Rapuano

=== Second leg ===
22 May 2026	Südtirol	0−0 (0−0 agg.)	Bari	Bolzano
20:00 CEST (UTC+2)		Report		Stadium: Stadio Marco Druso; Attendance: 5,500; Referee: Federico La Penna

The relegation play-out ended 0–0 on aggregate. As Südtirol finished the regular season in a higher position than Bari, Südtirol remained in Serie B, while Bari were relegated to Serie C.

== Season statistics ==
=== Top goalscorers ===
Rank	Player	Club	Goals
1	(Finland) Joel Pohjanpalo^{1}	Palermo	25
2	(Italy) Andrea Adorante	Venezia	17
3	(Algeria) Farès Ghedjemis	Frosinone	15
3	(Albania) Stiven Shpendi	Empoli	15
5	(Italy) Antonio Di Nardo	Pescara	14
6	(Italy) Gabriele Artistico	Spezia	13
6	(Italy) Pietro Iemmello^{3}	Catanzaro	13
8	(Italy) Tommaso Biasci	Avellino	12
8	(Italy) Filippo Pittarello	Catanzaro	12
8	(Albania) Cristian Shpendi	Cesena	12

Note

^{1} Player scored 1 goals in the play-offs.
^{3} Player scored 3 goals in the play-offs.

=== Hat-tricks ===
Player	Club	Against	Result	Date
(Finland) Joel Pohjanpalo	Palermo	Carrarese	5–0 (H)	29 November 2025
(Italy) Tommaso Biasci	Avellino	Cesena	3–1 (H)	31 January 2026

Note

(H) – Home (A) – Away

=== Clean sheets ===
Rank	Player	Club	Clean sheets
1	(Finland) Jesse Joronen^{1}	Palermo	18
1	(Senegal) Demba Thiam^{1}	Monza	18
3	(Serbia) Filip Stanković	Venezia	17
4	(Argentina) Leandro Chichizola	Modena	15
4	(Italy) Lorenzo Palmisani	Frosinone	15
6	(Italy) Marco Bleve	Carrarese	12
6	(Italy) Alessandro Confente^{1}	Juve Stabia	12
6	(Italy) Mirko Pigliacelli^{3}	Catanzaro	12
9	(Lithuania) Marius Adamonis^{2}	Südtirol	10
10	(Italy) Michele Cerofolini^{2}	Bari	9

Note

^{1} Player kept 1 clean-sheet in the play-offs.
^{2} Player kept 2 clean-sheets in the play-offs.
^{3} Player kept 3 clean-sheets in the play-offs.

=== Discipline ===
==== Player ====
- Most yellow cards: 15
  - (Argentina) Julián Illanes (Carrarese)
- Most red cards: 2
  - (Italy) Simone Bastoni (Cesena)
  - (Spain) Bernat Guiu (Virtus Entella)
  - (Italy) Armando Izzo (Monza/Avellino)
  - (Italy) Rachid Kouda (Spezia)
  - (Belgium) Joël Schingtienne (Venezia)

==== Club ====
- Most yellow cards: 90
  - Padova
- Most red cards: 11
  - Spezia
- Fewest yellow cards: 64
  - Venezia
- Fewest red cards: 1
  - Carrarese

== Awards ==
=== Monthly ===
Month	MVP of the Month		Ref
September	(Algeria) Farès Ghedjemis	Frosinone	
October	(Italy) Alphadjo Cissè	Catanzaro	
November	(Italy) Giacomo Calò	Frosinone	
December	(Finland) Joel Pohjanpalo	Palermo	
January	(Italy) Andrea Adorante	Venezia	
February	(Finland) Joel Pohjanpalo	Palermo	
March	(Italy) Antonio Di Nardo	Pescara	
April	(Italy) Giacomo Calò	Frosinone	

=== Annual ===
Award	Winner	Club	Ref
MVP of the season	(Italy) Andrea Adorante	Venezia	
Play-offs MVP	(Brazil) Hernani	Monza	

== Attendances ==
Serie B clubs listed by average home league attendance in the 2025–26 season:

Pos	Club	Average attendance
1	Palermo FC	18,800
2	Sampdoria	16,923
3	Cesena FC	10,569
4	Frosinone Calcio	10,405
5	Modena FC	10,394
6	SSC Bari	9,944
7	US Avellino	9,923
8	Reggiana	9,454
9	Venezia FC	9,396
10	US Catanzaro	9,225
11	Delfino Pescara	9,171
12	Spezia Calcio	8,807
13	Calcio Padova	8,778
14	Mantova 1911	8,753
15	AC Monza	8,516
16	Empoli FC	8,455
17	FC Südtirol	6,733
18	Juve Stabia	6,695
19	Carrarese Calcio	6,600
20	Virtus Entella	5,924
