= 2025–26 AS Giana Erminio season =

Association football season

AS Giana Erminio
2025–26 season
- Manager: Vinicio Espinal
- Stadium: Stadio Città di Gorgonzola
- Serie C Group A: 9th
- Coppa Italia Serie C: First round
- Biggest win: Giana Erminio 2–1 Pro Patria
- Biggest defeat: Giana Erminio 1–4 Atalanta U23

The 2025–26 season is the 117th in the history of Associazione Sportiva Giana Erminio and the club's third consecutive season in Serie C. In addition to the domestic league, Giana Erminio competes in the Coppa Italia Serie C. The season began on 16 August 2025.

On 24 June 2025, the Lombard club announced the appointment of Dominican Vinicio Espinal as head coach, succeeding Andrea Chiappella.

== Squad ==
=== Transfers In ===
Pos.	Player	Transferred from	Fee	Date	Source
FW	(Italy) Carmelo Muzio	(Italy) Fossano	Loan return	30 June 2025	
FW	(Nigeria) Franklyn Akammadu	(Italy) Crema	Free	15 July 2025	
FW	(Italy) Giacomo Gabbiani	(Italy) Cremonese U20	Loan	28 July 2025	
GK	(Italy) Andrea Mazza	(Italy) AC Monza	Undisclosed	6 August 2025	
MF	(Italy) Lorenzo Lischetti	(Italy) Spezia U19	Loan	7 August 2025	
MF	(Italy) Alessandro Berretta	(Italy) Monza	Loan	13 August 2025	
MF	(Italy) Alessio Rizzo	(Italy) Ravenna	Free	25 August 2025	
MF	(Italy) Alessandro Albertini	(Italy) Pergolettese	Undisclosed	1 September 2025	

=== Transfers Out ===
Pos.	Player	Transferred to	Fee	Date	Source
DF	(Italy) Mattia Scaringi	(Italy) Cremonese	Loan return	30 June 2025	
MF	(Italy) Nicolò Ledonne	(Italy) Juventus Next Gen	Loan return	30 June 2025	
FW	(Denmark) David Stückler	(Italy) Cremonese	Loan return	30 June 2025	
MF	(Italy) Marco Nichetti	(Italy) Virtus Entella	Free	8 July 2025	
MF	(Italy) Lorenzo Caferri	(Italy) Vicenza	Free	14 July 2025	
FW	(Italy) Gabriel Avinci	(Italy) Casatese Merate	Loan	15 July 2025	
MF	(Italy) Martin Montipò	(Italy) Legnago Salus	Free	9 August 2025	
MF	(Italy) Tommaso Spaviero	(Italy) Campodarsego	Free	9 August 2025	
FW	(Italy) Petar Rankovic	(Italy) Club Milano	Free	9 August 2025	
FW	(Italy) Carmelo Muzio	(Italy) Folgore Caratese	Contract terminated	14 August 2025	
FW	(Italy) Alberto Pala	(Italy) Pergolettese	Undisclosed	1 September 2025	

== Friendlies ==
24 July 2025	Monza	1–0	Giana Erminio	Monza
17:30	Keita 9'	Report		Stadium: Centro Sportivo Silvio e Luigi Berlusconi; Referee: Luca De Angeli

2 August 2025	Varese	0–2	Giana Erminio	Gavirate
17:00				Stadium: centro sportivo Vittore Anessi

9 August 2025	Ponte SP Mapello	1–3	Giana Erminio	Stadio Matteo Legler
18:00

10 August 2025 Triangular tournament	Desenzano	2–0	Giana Erminio	Desenzano del Garda
	Vitale 9'; Andreis 29'	Report		Stadium: Stadio Tre Stelle
Note: A 45-minute match

10 August 2025 Triangular tournament	Union Brescia	0–2	Giana Erminio	Desenzano del Garda
		Report	Renda 16'; Alborghetti 24'	Stadium: Stadio Tre Stelle
Note: A 45-minute match

== Competitions ==
=== Overall record ===
Competition	First match	Last match	Starting round	Final position	Record							
Competition	First match	Last match	Starting round	Final position	Pld	W	D	L	GF	GA	GD	Win %
Serie C	23 August 2025	26 April 2026	Matchday 1		5	1	2	2	3	6	−3	20.00
Coppa Italia Serie C	16 August 2025		First round	First round	1	0	0	1	1	4	−3	0.00
Total					6	1	2	3	4	10	−6	16.67

Last updated: 21 September 2025
Source: Competitions

=== Serie C ===
Group A

==== Results summary ====
Overall								Home						Away					
Pld	W	D	L	GF	GA	GD	Pts	W	D	L	GF	GA	GD	W	D	L	GF	GA	GD
5	1	2	2	3	6	−3	5	1	0	1	2	3	−1	0	2	1	1	3	−2

Last updated: 21 September 2025.

==== Results by round ====
Round	1	2	3	4	5
Ground	H	A	H	A	A
Result	L	D	W	D	L
Position	19	19			

Updated to match(es) played on 21 September 2025. Source:
A = Away; H = Home; W = Win; D = Draw; L = Loss

==== Matches ====
The competition draw was held on 28 July 2025.

23 August 2025 1	Giana Erminio	0–2	Trento	Gorgonzola
18:00 UTC+2			Capone 47'; Mazza 71' (o.g.)	Stadium: Stadio Città di Gorgonzola; Attendance: 680; Referee: Alfredo Iannello

30 August 2025 2	Renate	1–1	Giana Erminio	Meda
18:00 UTC+2	Anelli 90'		Berretta 55'	Stadium: Stadio "Città di Meda"; Attendance: 350; Referee: Valerio Vogliacco

7 September 2025 3	Giana Erminio	2–1	Pro Patria	Gorgonzola
17:30 UTC+2	Alborghetti 21'; Ballabio 90+2'		Mastroianni 58'	Stadium: Stadio Città di Gorgonzola; Referee: Enrico Cappai

12 September 2025 4	Arzignano Valchiampo	0–0	Giana Erminio	Arzignano
20:30 UTC+2				Stadium: Stadio Tommaso Dal Molin; Attendance: 645; Referee: Gianluca Guitaldi

21 September 2025 5	Union Brescia	2–0	Giana Erminio	Brescia
20:30 UTC+2	Di Molfetta 3'; Maistrello 18'			Stadium: Stadio Mario Rigamonti; Referee: Filippo Colaninno

=== Coppa Italia Serie C ===
16 August 2025 First round	Giana Erminio	1–4	Atalanta U23	Gorgonzola
18:00	Renda 38'		Cissé 19'; Panada 45'; Pounga 67'; Vavassori 70'	Stadium: Stadio Città di Gorgonzola; Referee: Lorenzo Massari
