= 2021–22 Serie B =

Italian football league season

Serie B
- Season: 2021–22
- Dates: Regular season: 20 August 2021 – 6 May 2022; Play-offs and play-outs: 13 May 2022 – 29 May 2022
- Champions: Lecce (2nd title)
- Promoted: Lecce; Cremonese; Monza (via play-off)
- Relegated: Vicenza (via play-out); Alessandria; Crotone; Pordenone
- Matches: 380
- Goals: 942 (2.48 per match)
- Top goalscorer: Massimo Coda (20 goals)
- Biggest home win: SPAL 5–0 Pordenone (29 August 2021); Ternana 5–0 Vicenza (23 October 2021); Benevento 5–0 Como (23 February 2022)
- Biggest away win: Pordenone 0–4 Parma (12 September 2021); Reggina 0–4 Alessandria (12 December 2021)
- Highest scoring: Ternana 4–4 Frosinone (18 April 2022)
- Longest winning run: Benevento (14–18); Pisa (1–5) (5 matches)
- Longest unbeaten run: Lecce (2–16) (15 matches)
- Longest winless run: Cosenza (11–25) (15 matches)
- Longest losing run: Pordenone (22–28) (7 matches)
- Highest attendance: 26,904; Lecce 1–0 Pordenone (6 May 2022)
- Lowest attendance: 450; Pordenone 2–0 Frosinone (5 April 2022)
- Total attendance: 1,681,765
- Average attendance: 4,312

The 2021–22 Serie B (known as the Serie BKT for sponsorship reasons) was the 90th season of the Serie B since its establishment in 1929.

== Changes ==
The following teams have changed division since the 2020–21 season:

=== To Serie B ===
Relegated from Serie A

- Benevento
- Crotone
- Parma

Promoted from Serie C

- Como (Group A)
- Perugia (Group B)
- Ternana (Group C)
- Alessandria (play-off winners)

=== From Serie B ===
Promoted to Serie A

- Empoli
- Salernitana
- Venezia

Relegated to Serie C

- Chievo (excluded)
- Reggiana
- Pescara
- Virtus Entella

== Teams ==
=== Stadiums and locations ===
Location of teams in 2021–22 Serie B

Team	Home city	Stadium	Capacity	2020–21 season
Alessandria	Alessandria	Giuseppe Moccagatta	5,936	Serie C play-off winners
Ascoli	Ascoli Piceno	Cino e Lillo Del Duca	12,461	16th in Serie B
Benevento	Benevento	Ciro Vigorito	16,867	18th in Serie A
Brescia	Brescia	Mario Rigamonti	19,500	7th in Serie B
Cittadella	Cittadella (Padua)	Pier Cesare Tombolato	7,623	6th in Serie B
Como	Como	Giuseppe Sinigaglia	13,602	Serie C Group A champions
Cosenza	Cosenza	San Vito-Gigi Marulla	20,987	17th in Serie B
Cremonese	Cremona	Giovanni Zini	20,641	13th in Serie B
Crotone	Crotone	Ezio Scida	16,640	19th in Serie A
Frosinone	Frosinone	Benito Stirpe	16,227	10th in Serie B
Lecce	Lecce	Via del Mare	31,533	4th in Serie B
Monza	Monza	Brianteo	10,000	3rd in Serie B
Parma	Parma	Ennio Tardini	27,906	20th in Serie A
Perugia	Perugia	Renato Curi	23,625	Serie C Group B champions
Pisa	Pisa	Arena Garibaldi	25,000	14th in Serie B
Pordenone	Pordenone	Guido Teghil (Lignano Sabbiadoro)	5,000	15th in Serie B
Reggina	Reggio Calabria	Oreste Granillo	27,543	11th in Serie B
SPAL	Ferrara	Paolo Mazza	16,134	9th in Serie B
Ternana	Terni	Libero Liberati	22,000	Serie C Group C champions
Vicenza	Vicenza	Romeo Menti	12,000	12th in Serie B

=== Personnel and kits ===
Team	President	Manager	Captain	Kit manufacturer	Shirt sponsor (front)	Shirt sponsor (back)	Shirt sponsor (sleeve)	Shorts sponsor
Alessandria	(Italy) Luca Di Masi	(Italy) Moreno Longo	(Italy) Giuseppe Prestia	Adidas	Y3K	Gruppo AMAG	ReLife Group	None
Ascoli	(Italy) Carlo Neri	(Italy) Andrea Sottil	(Italy) Federico Dionisi	Νike	Fainplast Compounds/Ascoli Piceno Candidata a Capitale italiana della cultura 2024, Bricofer/Distretti Ecologici/FEVO/Rabona Mobile	Rabona Mobile/North Sixth Group/D&G Service 2008	Ecotel Italia	Gruppo Boero
Benevento	(Italy) Oreste Vigorito	(Italy) Fabio Caserta	(Italy) Gaetano Letizia	Nike	IVPC, Rillo Construzioni	Pasta Rummo	Gesesa	Comfort Zone
Brescia	(Italy) Massimo Cellino	(Italy) Eugenio Corini	(Italy) Dimitri Bisoli	Kappa	Rigamonti Salumificio	OMR	Pardgroup	None
Cittadella	(Italy) Andrea Gabrielli	(Italy) Edoardo Gorini	(Italy) Romano Perticone	Mizuno	Sirmax, Gruppo Gabrielli	Stylplex (H)/Quartzforms (A)	Pastificio Cecchin	Metalservice
Como	(England) Dennis Wise	(Italy) Giacomo Gattuso	(Italy) Alessandro Bellemo	Legea	Mola	Acqua S. Bernardo	Randstad	Pulsee Luce e Gas
Cosenza	(Italy) Eugenio Guarascio	(Italy) Pierpaolo Bisoli	(Italy) Luca Palmiero	Legea	Hexergia/Quattropuntozero	None	La Valle Viaggi	Supermercati Contè
Cremonese	(Italy) Paolo Rossi	(Italy) Fabio Pecchia	(Italy) Daniel Ciofani	Acerbis	Ilta Inox (H)/Arinox (A), Arvedi	Fattorie Cremona	Synlab	Arvedi Tubi Acciaio
Crotone	(Italy) Gianni Vrenna	(Italy) Francesco Modesto	(Argentina) Nahuel Estévez	Zeus	San Vincenzo Salumi, Envì Group	Ford Vumbaca Group	Econet	GCM Industrie
Frosinone	(Italy) Maurizio Stirpe	(Italy) Fabio Grosso	(Italy) Nicolò Brighenti	Zeus	Banca Popolare del Frusinate, Portobello	Polsinelli Enologia	Orsolini	Plasta Rei
Lecce	(Italy) Saverio Sticchi Damiani	(Italy) Marco Baroni	(Italy) Fabio Lucioni	M908	Links Management & Technology, Studio Sticchi Damiani/Asfalti Isolbit	Barocco SpA/DEGHI	Banca Popolare Pugliese	Asfalti Isolbit/Platino News
Monza	(Italy) Paolo Berlusconi	(Italy) Giovanni Stroppa	(Italy) Mario Sampirisi	Lotto	WithU, U-Power	Pontenossa	Febal Casa	Dell'Orto
Parma	(United States) Kyle Krause	(Italy) Giuseppe Iachini	(Italy) Gianluigi Buffon	Erreà	Cetilar, Gravity Sport	EGO Airways	Canovi Coperture	COLSER Servizi
Perugia	(Italy) Massimiliano Santopadre	(Italy) Massimiliano Alvini	(Italy) Gabriele Angella	Frankie Garage	Nutrihum, Vitakraft	Re Salmone	Sisas	Mericat Group
Pisa	(Italy) Giuseppe Corrado	(Italy) Luca D'Angelo	(Austria) Robert Gucher	Adidas	Cetilar, Synlab/Ferramenta Piampiani/Pisanova	Hi-Turf Solution	Maiora-AB Yachts	Beapp/SEAC/Toni Luigi Scavi e Demolizioni/Cavarretta Assicurazioni
Pordenone	(Italy) Mauro Lovisa	(Italy) Bruno Tedino	(Italy) Mirko Stefani	Givova	Omega Gruppo, 6sicuro.it	Lignano Sabbiadoro	Alea Office	CRO Area Giovani
Reggina	(Italy) Luca Gallo	(Italy) Roberto Stellone	(Italy) Lorenzo Crisetig	Macron	Dalia/Centroriparo Bellè Gomme, Soseteg	Puliservice	Caffè Mauro	D. Caracciolo & figli
SPAL	(United States) Joe Tacopina	(Italy) Roberto Venturato	(Italy) Francesco Vicari	Macron	Omega Group	Errebi Technology	Adamant BioNRG	Golden Group
Ternana	(Italy) Stefano Bandecchi	(Italy) Cristiano Lucarelli	(Italy) Marino Defendi	Macron	Unicusano, Terni Col Cuore	None	Orsolini	None
Vicenza	(Italy) Renzo Rosso	(Italy) Francesco Baldini	(Italy) Stefano Giacomelli	Lotto	Diesel, Aon (H)/Fendt (A)/SC Saldatura Carpenteria (T)	Sicura (H)/Famila (A & T)	Legor (H)	Zanutta (H)/SC Saldatura Carpenteria (A)/Trivellato Industriali (T)

=== Managerial changes ===
Team	Outgoing manager	Manner of departure	Date of vacancy	Position in table	Replaced by	Date of appointment
Lecce	(Italy) Eugenio Corini	Sacked	22 May 2021	Pre-season	(Italy) Marco Baroni	1 July 2021
Parma	(Italy) Roberto D'Aversa	Sacked	23 May 2021	Pre-season	(Italy) Enzo Maresca	1 July 2021
Monza	(Italy) Cristian Brocchi	Mutual consent	28 May 2021	Pre-season	(Italy) Giovanni Stroppa	1 July 2021
Perugia	(Italy) Fabio Caserta	Mutual consent	14 June 2021	Pre-season	(Italy) Massimiliano Alvini	1 July 2021
Reggina	(Italy) Marco Baroni	End of contract	30 June 2021	Pre-season	(Italy) Alfredo Aglietti	1 July 2021
Crotone	(Italy) Serse Cosmi	End of contract	30 June 2021	Pre-season	(Italy) Francesco Modesto	1 July 2021
Pordenone	(Italy) Maurizio Domizzi	End of contract	30 June 2021	Pre-season	(Italy) Massimo Paci	1 July 2021
Benevento	(Italy) Filippo Inzaghi	End of contract	30 June 2021	Pre-season	(Italy) Fabio Caserta	1 July 2021
Brescia	(Spain) Pep Clotet	End of contract	30 June 2021	Pre-season	(Italy) Filippo Inzaghi	30 June 2021
SPAL	(Italy) Massimo Rastelli	End of contract	30 June 2021	Pre-season	(Spain) Pep Clotet	2 July 2021
Cittadella	(Italy) Roberto Venturato	End of contract	30 June 2021	Pre-season	(Italy) Edoardo Gorini	19 July 2021
Cosenza	(Italy) Roberto Occhiuzzi	Sacked	22 July 2021	Pre-season	(Italy) Marco Zaffaroni	6 August 2021
Pordenone	(Italy) Massimo Paci	Sacked	30 August 2021	20th	(Italy) Massimo Rastelli	31 August 2021
Vicenza	(Italy) Domenico Di Carlo	Sacked	22 September 2021	19th	(Italy) Cristian Brocchi	22 September 2021
Pordenone	(Italy) Massimo Rastelli	Sacked	16 October 2021	20th	(Italy) Bruno Tedino	18 October 2021
Crotone	(Italy) Francesco Modesto	Sacked	29 October 2021	18th	(Italy) Pasquale Marino	29 October 2021
Parma	(Italy) Enzo Maresca	Sacked	23 November 2021	14th	(Italy) Giuseppe Iachini	23 November 2021
Cosenza	(Italy) Marco Zaffaroni	Sacked	6 December 2021	16th	(Italy) Roberto Occhiuzzi	7 December 2021
Crotone	(Italy) Pasquale Marino	Sacked	10 December 2021	18th	(Italy) Francesco Modesto	10 December 2021
Reggina	(Italy) Alfredo Aglietti	Sacked	13 December 2021	13th	(Italy) Domenico Toscano	14 December 2021
SPAL	(Spain) Pep Clotet	Sacked	5 January 2022	15th	(Italy) Roberto Venturato	5 January 2022
Reggina	(Italy) Domenico Toscano	Sacked	23 January 2022	14th	(Italy) Roberto Stellone	24 January 2022
Cosenza	(Italy) Roberto Occhiuzzi	Sacked	16 February 2022	17th	(Italy) Pierpaolo Bisoli	17 February 2022
Brescia	(Italy) Filippo Inzaghi	Sacked	23 March 2022	5th	(Italy) Eugenio Corini	23 March 2022
Vicenza	(Italy) Cristian Brocchi	Sacked	11 April 2022	18th	(Italy) Francesco Baldini	12 April 2022

== League table ==
Pos	Team	Pld	W	D	L	GF	GA	GD	Pts	Promotion, qualification or relegation
1	Lecce (C, P)	38	19	14	5	59	31	+28	71	Promotion to Serie A
2	Cremonese (P)	38	20	9	9	57	39	+18	69	Promotion to Serie A
3	Pisa	38	18	13	7	48	35	+13	67 (Note: Pisa finished ahead of Monza on head-to-head points: Pisa 2–1 Monza, Monza 1–2 Pisa.)	Qualification for promotion play-offs semi-finals
4	Monza (O, P)	38	19	10	9	60	38	+22	67	Qualification for promotion play-offs semi-finals
5	Brescia	38	17	15	6	55	35	+20	66	Qualification for promotion play-offs preliminary round
6	Ascoli	38	19	8	11	52	42	+10	65	Qualification for promotion play-offs preliminary round
7	Benevento	38	18	9	11	62	39	+23	63	Qualification for promotion play-offs preliminary round
8	Perugia	38	14	16	8	40	32	+8	58 (Note: Perugia finished ahead of Frosinone on head-to-head points: Frosinone 0–0 Perugia, Perugia 3–0 Frosinone.)	Qualification for promotion play-offs preliminary round
9	Frosinone	38	15	13	10	58	45	+13	58	
10	Ternana	38	15	9	14	58	61	−3	54	
11	Cittadella	38	13	13	12	38	36	+2	52	
12	Parma	38	11	16	11	48	43	+5	49	
13	Como	38	11	14	13	49	54	−5	47	
14	Reggina (Note: Reggina were deducted 2 points for administrative irregularities.)	38	13	9	16	31	49	−18	46	
15	SPAL	38	9	15	14	46	54	−8	42	
16	Cosenza (O)	38	8	11	19	36	59	−23	35	Qualification for relegation play-out
17	Vicenza (R)	38	9	7	22	38	59	−21	34 (Note: Vicenza finished ahead of Alessandria on head-to-head points: Vicenza 2–1 Alessandria, Alessandria 0–1 Vicenza.)	Qualification for relegation play-out
18	Alessandria (R)	38	8	10	20	37	59	−22	34	Relegation to Serie C
19	Crotone (R)	38	4	14	20	41	61	−20	26	Relegation to Serie C
20	Pordenone (R)	38	3	9	26	29	71	−42	18	Relegation to Serie C

Source: Lega Serie B (in Italian), Soccerway (in English)
Rules for classification: 1) Points; 2) Head-to-head points; 3) Head-to-head goal difference; 4) Goal difference; 5) Goals scored; 6) Draw.
(C) Champions; (O) Play-off winners; (P) Promoted; (R) Relegated

=== Positions by round ===
The table lists the positions of teams after each week of matches. In order to preserve chronological evolvements, any postponed matches are not included to the round at which they were originally scheduled, but added to the full round they were played immediately afterwards.

Team ╲ Round	1	2	3	4	5	6	7	8	9	10	11	12	13	14	15	16	17	18	19	20	21	22	23	24	25	26	27	28	29	30	31	32	33	34	35	36	37	38
Lecce	20	15	16	12	10	6	4	3	4	5	3	2	3	3	3	2	3	4	5	3	1	1	2	1	2	2	1	2	2	2	4	2	2	1	2	1	1	1
Cremonese	12	8	9	10	14	11	13	13	11	10	9	11	8	8	5	5	5	6	6	6	7	5	5	5	5	6	6	5	5	4	3	4	3	2	3	3	3	2
Pisa	7	3	2	1	1	1	1	1	1	1	1	3	2	1	2	1	1	1	1	1	2	3	4	3	4	5	4	3	1	3	2	3	4	6	5	4	4	3
Monza	1	10	5	3	6	3	2	2	5	6	7	8	5	6	8	6	6	3	4	5	4	2	1	2	3	1	3	1	3	1	1	1	1	3	1	2	2	4
Brescia	2	1	1	2	3	2	3	4	2	4	2	1	1	2	1	3	2	2	2	2	3	4	3	4	1	3	2	4	4	5	5	5	5	4	6	5	6	5
Ascoli	4	4	3	5	2	4	5	5	9	9	13	10	7	7	6	7	9	10	9	8	9	9	9	7	9	7	9	8	8	7	8	7	7	7	7	7	7	6
Benevento	3	11	11	9	4	5	6	6	3	2	4	6	11	5	4	4	4	5	3	4	6	6	7	6	6	4	5	6	6	6	7	6	6	5	4	6	5	7
Perugia	6	12	12	11	9	10	9	7	8	8	8	12	9	10	9	9	8	9	10	10	10	8	8	9	7	9	10	9	9	9	9	9	9	9	9	9	9	8
Frosinone	10	5	7	6	5	7	8	10	7	7	6	5	4	4	7	8	10	8	7	7	5	7	6	8	8	8	7	7	7	8	6	8	8	8	8	8	8	9
Ternana	19	17	19	17	15	15	15	14	10	14	16	13	13	13	13	11	12	12	13	12	12	13	14	13	13	14	13	13	12	13	13	11	13	11	10	10	10	10
Cittadella	5	2	6	4	8	12	7	9	12	16	12	9	10	11	10	10	7	7	8	9	8	10	10	10	10	10	8	10	10	10	10	10	11	10	11	11	11	11
Parma	11	6	4	8	12	13	12	12	15	13	10	14	14	14	14	15	15	13	12	13	13	11	13	14	14	13	14	14	14	12	14	14	10	12	13	13	14	12
Como	8	13	14	16	17	16	16	16	16	15	11	7	12	12	12	13	11	11	11	11	11	12	11	11	11	11	12	12	13	14	12	12	12	13	14	14	13	13
Reggina	13	7	8	7	7	8	10	8	6	3	5	4	6	9	11	12	13	14	14	14	15	14	12	12	12	12	11	11	11	11	11	13	14	14	12	12	12	14
SPAL	17	9	10	13	11	14	14	15	14	12	15	15	16	15	15	14	14	15	15	15	14	15	16	15	15	15	15	15	15	15	15	15	15	15	15	15	15	15
Cosenza	15	19	13	14	13	9	11	11	13	11	14	16	15	16	16	16	17	17	17	17	17	17	17	17	17	17	17	17	17	17	17	17	17	17	17	17	17	16
Vicenza	18	18	17	19	19	20	19	19	19	19	19	19	19	19	19	19	20	20	20	20	20	19	19	19	19	18	18	18	18	18	18	18	18	18	18	18	18	17
Alessandria	14	16	18	18	20	18	18	18	18	17	17	18	17	17	17	17	16	16	16	16	16	16	15	16	16	16	16	16	16	16	16	16	16	16	16	16	16	18
Crotone	9	14	15	15	16	17	17	17	17	18	18	17	18	18	18	18	18	18	18	18	18	18	18	18	18	19	19	19	19	19	19	19	19	19	19	19	19	19
Pordenone	16	20	20	20	18	19	20	20	20	20	20	20	20	20	20	20	19	19	19	19	19	20	20	20	20	20	20	20	20	20	20	20	20	20	20	20	20	20

Leader and promotion to Serie A
Promotion to Serie A
Play-off semifinals
Play-off preliminary round
Play-out
Relegation to Serie C

Source: WorldFootball.net

== Results ==
Home \ Away	ALE	ASC	BEN	BRE	CIT	COM	COS	CRE	CRO	FRO	LEC	MON	PAR	PER	PIS	POR	REG	SPA	TER	VIC
Alessandria	—	1–3	2–0	1–3	0–1	1–1	1–0	1–0	1–0	1–1	1–1	0–3	0–2	1–2	1–1	2–0	0–0	2–2	0–2	0–1
Ascoli	3–0	—	0–2	2–3	0–0	1–1	1–0	1–4	2–1	1–1	1–1	1–1	0–0	0–1	2–0	1–0	2–0	0–1	4–1	2–1
Benevento	4–3	0–2	—	0–1	4–1	5–0	3–0	1–1	3–1	1–4	0–0	3–1	0–0	0–0	5–1	2–1	4–0	1–2	1–2	1–0
Brescia	1–1	2–0	2–2	—	1–1	2–4	5–1	1–0	2–2	2–2	1–1	0–2	1–0	2–1	0–1	1–0	3–0	1–1	1–1	2–0
Cittadella	1–2	2–0	0–1	1–0	—	2–2	1–1	0–2	4–2	3–0	1–2	1–2	1–2	0–0	2–0	1–0	0–0	0–0	1–2	1–0
Como	2–0	0–1	1–1	1–1	1–2	—	2–1	1–2	1–1	0–2	1–1	2–0	1–1	4–1	0–1	1–0	1–1	0–2	1–1	0–2
Cosenza	2–1	1–3	1–0	0–0	1–0	2–0	—	0–2	1–0	1–1	2–2	0–2	1–3	1–2	0–2	3–1	0–1	0–1	3–1	2–1
Cremonese	2–1	0–1	1–1	2–1	2–0	2–0	3–1	—	3–2	1–1	3–0	3–2	3–1	0–3	1–1	2–1	1–1	1–1	2–0	0–0
Crotone	0–0	2–2	0–2	0–1	0–0	2–2	3–3	3–1	—	2–0	0–3	1–1	0–1	1–1	2–1	4–1	1–1	1–2	1–2	0–1
Frosinone	3–0	2–1	2–0	2–2	0–1	1–2	1–0	2–1	2–1	—	0–0	4–1	2–2	0–0	1–2	2–2	3–0	4–0	1–1	2–0
Lecce	3–2	3–1	1–1	1–1	1–2	1–1	3–1	2–1	3–0	1–0	—	3–0	4–0	0–0	2–0	1–0	2–0	1–0	3–3	2–1
Monza	1–0	2–0	3–0	1–1	1–0	3–2	4–1	1–0	1–0	3–2	0–1	—	1–1	2–2	1–2	3–1	1–0	4–0	1–1	4–0
Parma	2–2	0–1	1–0	0–1	1–1	4–3	1–1	1–2	1–1	0–1	0–0	0–0	—	1–1	1–1	4–1	1–1	4–0	2–3	1–0
Perugia	1–1	2–3	0–1	1–0	1–1	0–1	1–1	0–0	2–0	3–0	1–1	1–0	2–1	—	1–1	0–1	0–2	1–1	1–1	1–0
Pisa	2–0	1–1	1–0	0–0	1–0	3–1	1–1	3–0	3–2	1–3	1–0	2–1	0–0	1–1	—	1–1	2–0	1–0	0–0	2–2
Pordenone	2–0	0–1	1–4	1–1	0–1	1–1	1–1	2–2	3–3	2–0	0–1	1–4	0–4	0–1	0–1	—	1–1	1–1	1–3	2–4
Reggina	0–4	1–2	0–3	0–2	0–1	1–4	1–0	1–2	1–0	0–0	1–0	0–0	2–1	0–1	1–0	2–0	—	2–1	3–2	3–1
SPAL	2–3	1–2	1–1	0–2	0–0	1–1	2–2	0–2	1–1	3–0	1–3	1–1	2–2	1–2	0–0	5–0	1–3	—	5–1	3–2
Ternana	3–0	2–4	0–2	0–2	1–1	1–2	2–0	1–2	1–0	4–4	1–4	0–1	3–1	1–0	1–4	1–0	2–0	1–0	—	5–0
Vicenza	2–1	2–0	2–3	2–3	3–3	0–1	0–0	0–1	1–1	0–2	2–1	1–1	0–1	1–2	1–3	1–0	0–1	1–1	3–1	—

Source: Serie B (in Italian), Soccerway (in English)
Legend: Blue = home team win; Yellow = draw; Red = away team win.

== Promotion play-offs ==
Rules:

- Preliminary round: the higher-placed team played at home. If teams were tied after regular time, extra time was played. If scores were still level, the higher-placed team advanced;
- Semi-finals: the higher-placed team played at home for second leg. If teams were tied on aggregate, the higher-placed team advanced;
- Final: the higher-placed team played at home for second leg. If teams were tied on aggregate, the higher-placed team was promoted to Serie A, unless the teams finished tied on points after regular season, in which case winner was decided by extra time and a penalty shoot-out if necessary.

Preliminary round
5	Brescia (a.e.t.)	3
8	Perugia	2
6	Ascoli	0
7	Benevento	1

Semi-finals
5	Brescia	1	1	2
4	Monza	2	2	4
7	Benevento	1	0	1
3	Pisa	0	1	1

Final
4	Monza (a.e.t.)	2	4	6
3	Pisa	1	3	4

=== Preliminary round ===
13 May 2022	Ascoli	0–1	Benevento	Ascoli Piceno
20:30 CEST (UTC+2)		Report	Lapadula 38'	Stadium: Cino e Lillo Del Duca; Attendance: 10,797; Referee: Gianluca Manganiello

14 May 2022	Brescia	3–2 (a.e.t.)	Perugia	Brescia
18:00 CEST (UTC+2)	Pajač 45+6' (pen.); Ayé 107'; Bianchi 118'	Report	Kouan 10'; Matos 102'	Stadium: Mario Rigamonti; Attendance: 10,740; Referee: Francesco Fourneau

=== Semi-finals ===
==== First leg ====
17 May 2022	Benevento	1–0	Pisa	Benevento
20:30 CEST (UTC+2)	Lapadula 85'	Report		Stadium: Ciro Vigorito; Attendance: 10,979; Referee: Alessandro Prontera

18 May 2022	Brescia	1–2	Monza	Brescia
20:00 CEST (UTC+2)	Moreo 7'	Report	Gytkjær 44', 56' (pen.)	Stadium: Mario Rigamonti; Attendance: 13,600; Referee: Gianluca Aureliano

==== Second leg ====
21 May 2022	Pisa	1–0 (1–1 agg.)	Benevento	Pisa
18:00 CEST (UTC+2)	Benali 11'	Report		Stadium: Arena Garibaldi; Attendance: 9,942; Referee: Simone Sozza

22 May 2022	Monza	2–1 (4–2 agg.)	Brescia	Monza
21:00 CEST (UTC+2)	Mancuso 70'; D'Alessandro 90+4'	Report	Tramoni 7'	Stadium: Brianteo; Attendance: 8,559; Referee: Paolo Valeri

=== Final ===
==== First leg ====
26 May 2022	Monza	2–1	Pisa	Monza
20:30 CEST (UTC+2)	Mota 9'; Gytkjær 74'	Report	Berra 90+3'	Stadium: Brianteo; Attendance: 9,649; Referee: Marco Guida

==== Second leg ====
29 May 2022	Pisa	3–4 (a.e.t.) (4–6 agg.)	Monza	Pisa
20:30 CEST (UTC+2)	Torregrossa 1'; Hermannsson 9'; Mastinu 90'	Report	Machín 20'; Gytkjær 79', 101'; Marrone 96'	Stadium: Arena Garibaldi; Attendance: 9,942; Referee: Maurizio Mariani

== Relegation play-out ==
The higher-placed team played at home for the second leg. If the teams were tied on aggregate, the lower-placed team was relegated to Serie C, unless the teams finished tied on points after the regular season, in which case the winner was decided by extra time and a penalty shoot-out if necessary.

Team 1	Agg.	Team 2	1st leg	2nd leg
Vicenza	1–2	Cosenza	1–0	0–2

=== First leg ===
12 May 2022	Vicenza	1–0	Cosenza	Vicenza
20:30 CEST (UTC+2)	Maggio 90'	Report		Stadium: Romeo Menti; Attendance: 10,659; Referee: Fabio Maresca

=== Second leg ===
20 May 2022	Cosenza	2–0 (2–1 agg.)	Vicenza	Cosenza
20:30 CEST (UTC+2)	Larrivey 46', 67' (pen.)	Report		Stadium: San Vito-Gigi Marulla; Attendance: 17,771; Referee: Davide Massa

== Season statistics ==
=== Top goalscorers ===
Rank	Player	Club	Goals
1	(Italy) Massimo Coda	Lecce	20
2	(Italy) Alfredo Donnarumma	Ternana	14
2	(Denmark) Christian Gytkjær^{5}	Monza	14
2	(Brazil) Gabriel Strefezza	Lecce	14
2	(Argentina) Franco Vázquez	Parma	14
6	(Peru) Gianluca Lapadula^{2}	Benevento	13
7	(Italy) Simone Corazza	Alessandria	12
7	(Portugal) Dany Mota^{1}	Monza	12
9	(Croatia) Mirko Marić	Crotone	11
10	(Italy) Enrico Baldini	Cittadella	10
10	(Italy) Alberto Cerri	Como	10
10	(France) Gabriel Charpentier	Frosinone	10
10	(Italy) Manuel De Luca	Perugia	10
10	(Italy) Stefano Moreo^{1}	Brescia	10
10	(Italy) Mattia Valoti	Monza	10

Note

^{1} Player scored 1 goal in the play-offs.
^{2} Player scored 2 goals in the play-offs.
^{5} Player scored 5 goals in the play-offs.

=== Hat-tricks ===
Player	Club	Against	Result	Date
(Italy) Simone Corazza	Alessandria	Benevento	3–4 (A)	22 August 2021
(Peru) Gianluca Lapadula	Benevento	Cittadella	4–1 (H)	21 September 2021
(Italy) Massimo Coda	Lecce	Parma	4–0 (H)	7 November 2021
(Croatia) Mirko Marić	Crotone	Cosenza	3–3 (H)	23 February 2022
(Italy) Ettore Gliozzi	Como	Parma	3–4 (A)	6 April 2022
(Italy) Frank Tsadjout	Ascoli	Ternana	4–1 (H)	6 May 2022

Note

(H) – Home (A) – Away

=== Clean sheets ===
Rank	Player	Club	Clean sheets	Game weeks
1	(Italy) Michele Di Gregorio	Monza	15	1–2, 8–9, 11, 16, 20, 22–23, 29–31, 33–34, 37
1	(Finland) Jesse Joronen	Brescia	15	1, 4, 9, 11–12, 15, 17, 19, 21, 23, 25, 32–34, 38
1	(Brazil) Nícolas^{1}	Pisa	15	1–2, 7, 13–14, 16, 18, 20, 22, 25, 28–29, 31, 33
4	(Argentina) Leandro Chichizola	Perugia	14	1, 3, 5, 7–9, 13, 16, 21–22, 24, 29, 33, 38
4	(Brazil) Gabriel	Lecce	14	3, 5, 7, 9, 12–13, 16, 19, 24, 26, 28, 34, 36, 38
4	(Italy) Alberto Paleari^{2}	Benevento	14	3–4, 7, 9, 14, 17, 21, 24–26, 33–34
7	(Albania) Elhan Kastrati	Cittadella	12	1, 4, 7–8, 11–12, 16–17, 23, 26–27, 33
8	(Italy) Nicola Leali	Ascoli	11	1, 3, 13, 16, 23–24, 30, 34–37
9	(Italy) Antony Iannarilli	Ternana	10	6, 9, 12, 15, 21–22, 27, 29, 31, 377
10	(Italy) Marco Carnesecchi	Cremonese	9	1, 3, 6, 16, 19, 22, 24–25, 31
10	(Italy) Federico Ravaglia	Frosinone	9	2–4, 6, 13, 18, 20–21, 25

Note

^{1} Player kept 1 clean sheet in the play-offs.
^{2} Player kept 2 clean sheets in the play-offs.

== Awards ==
=== Monthly ===
Month	MVP of the Month		Ref
February	(Italy) Massimo Coda	Lecce	
March	(Italy) Ernesto Torregrossa	Pisa	
April	(Italy) Gianluca Gaetano	Cremonese	

=== Annual ===
Award	Winner	Club	Ref
MVP of the season	(Italy) Massimo Coda	Lecce	
Play-offs MVP	(Denmark) Christian Gytkjær	Monza	
