= Marco Imperiale =

Italian footballer

Personal information
- Date of birth: 1 May 1999 (age 27)
- Place of birth: Partinico, Italy
- Height: 1.81 m (5 ft 11 in)
- Position: Defender

Team information
- Current team: Catanzaro
- Number: 3

Youth career
- –2016: Catanzaro

Senior career*
Years	Team	Apps	(Gls)
2016–2018	Catanzaro	22	(0)
2018–2021	Empoli	1	(0)
2018–2019	→ Robur Siena (loan)	24	(0)
2019–2020	→ Piacenza (loan)	21	(1)
2020–2021	→ Carrarese (loan)	18	(0)
2021–2026	Carrarese	160	(2)
2026–	Catanzaro	3	(0)
- * Club domestic league appearances and goals as of 19 September 2026

Marco Imperiale (born 1 May 1999) is an Italian footballer who plays as a defender for Serie B club Catanzaro.

== Club career ==
He made his Serie C debut for Catanzaro on 20 November 2016 in a game against Foggia.

On 9 August 2019, he joined Piacenza on loan.

On 29 August 2020, he moved to Carrarese on loan with an option to buy.

On 16 July 2021, he returned to Carrarese on a permanent basis and signed a three-year contract.
