= Antonio Calabro =

Italian footballer and coach (born 1976)

Personal information
- Full name: Nicola Antonio Calabro
- Date of birth: 10 August 1976 (age 50)
- Place of birth: Galatina, Italy
- Height: 1.80 m (5 ft 11 in)
- Position: Defender

Team information
- Current team: Padova (head coach)

Youth career
- Casarano
- Lazio

Senior career*
Years	Team	Apps	(Gls)
1993–1994	Lazio	0	(0)
1994–1997	Casarano	76	(1)
1997–1998	Castel di Sangro	16	(0)
1998–2002	Lecco	100	(0)
2002–2004	Brindisi	56	(2)
2004–2007	Manfredonia	68	(1)
2007–2008	Pistoiese	25	(1)
2009–2012	Casarano	71	(8)

International career
1991–1992	Italy U16	6	(0)
1992	Italy U15	6	(0)

Managerial career
- 2012–2014: Gallipoli
- 2014–2017: Virtus Francavilla
- 2017–2018: Carpi
- 2019: Viterbese
- 2019: Viterbese
- 2019–2020: Viterbese
- 2020–2021: Catanzaro
- 2022–2023: Virtus Francavilla
- 2024–2026: Carrarese
- 2026–: Padova
- * Club domestic league appearances and goals

Antonio Calabro (born 10 August 1976) is an Italian professional football coach and a former player. He is currently the head coach of Serie B club Padova.

== Playing career ==
Calabro's playing career started as a youth player for Lazio, with whom he only appeared once as an unused substitute in a Rome derby against Roma on 24 October 1993. After that, he left Lazio for Serie C1 outfit Casarano, and then went on to spend most of his career in the lower ranks of Italian football (mainly Serie C1 and Serie C2), with the highest point being a single Serie B season with Castel di Sangro in 1997–1998. He retired in 2012 after three seasons in the amateur leagues back to Casarano.

== Coaching career ==
In September 2012 he was named new head coach of Eccellenza amateurs Gallipoli. In his second season in charge, he won promotion to Serie D, but left the club soon after to accept an offer from another Eccellenza club, Virtus Francavilla.

As Virtus Francavilla coach, Calabro succeeded in winning two consecutive promotions, leading the small club from Salento from the amateur leagues to the professional ranks of Lega Pro, and then to a place in the promotion playoffs of the 2016–17 Lega Pro after ending the season with an impressive fifth place in the final table. He left the club by the end of the season and successively accepted an offer from Serie B club Carpi for the 2017–18 season. At the end of the season he left the Emilia-Romagna team and he was replaced by Marcello Chezzi.

On 21 January 2019, he was named new head coach of Serie C outfit Viterbese, replacing Stefano Sottili. He was fired on 30 April 2019 and replaced by Pino Rigoli. Being still in contract for the club, on 29 June 2019 he was reappointed as Viterbese head coach in preparation for the 2019–20 Serie C season. He rescinded his contract on 20 August 2019, before the start of the season, due to family reasons. He was rehired by Viterbese once again on 12 November 2019.

On 6 August 2020, he was hired by Serie C club Catanzaro. On 29 November 2021, he was fired by Catanzaro with his staff: Alberto Villa, Pasquale Visconti, Alessandro Imbrogno, Antonio Raione.

On 26 May 2022, Virtus Francavilla announced to have re-hired Calabro as their new head coach on a two-year deal, effective from 1 July 2022.

On 17 January 2024, Calabro was hired as the new head coach of Serie C club Carrarese until the end of the season. Later in June 2024, he led Carrarese to victory in the promotion playoffs, winning a spot in the 2024–25 Serie B.

On 13 June 2026, he was announced as the new head coach of Serie B club Padova, signing a two years contract.
