= Dominic Vavassori =

Italian footballer (born 2005)

Personal information
- Date of birth: 9 December 2005 (age 20)
- Place of birth: Bergamo, Italy
- Height: 1.73 m (5 ft 8 in)
- Positions: Forward; attacking midfielder; winger

Team information
- Current team: Palermo (on loan from Atalanta)
- Number: 9

Youth career
- US Buraghese
- –2017: SS Tritium
- 2017–2025: Atalanta

Senior career*
Years	Team	Apps	(Gls)
2024–	Atalanta U23	56	(17)
2025–	Atalanta	1	(0)
2026–	→ Palermo (loan)	11	(6)

International career^{‡}
2024–2026	Italy U20	7	(2)
2026–	Italy U21	1	(0)
- * Club domestic league appearances and goals as of 6 November 2026 ‡ National team caps and goals as of 8 June 2026

Dominic Vavassori (born 9 December 2005) is an Italian professional footballer who plays as a forward, attacking midfielder or winger for Serie B club Palermo, on loan from Atalanta.

== Club career ==
=== Atalanta ===
Born in Bergamo (his father, born in Brazil, was adopted by an Italian family; his mather is of Polish origin), Vavassori first played for US Buraghese in Burago di Molgora and SS Tritium, in Trezzo sull’Adda, before joining Atalanta's Youth Sector in 2017, where he first made strides with the Primavera team. He started playing for the reserve team in Serie C during the 2024–25 season. Vavassori made his professional debut with Atalanta U23, scoring in a 2–1 Coppa Italia Serie C win on 10 August 2024.

He was a standout with the reserve team during that season, most notably during the promotion play-offs, where he scored 5 goals as his team beat the likes of Trento, AlbinoLeffe and Torres, only narrowly missing an historical promotion to Serie B. That same month, he also first featured on the team sheet with the first team during the UEFA Super Cup against Real Madrid and the following Serie A game.

During the 2025–26 season, he confirmed his prolific form with the reserve team. In October 2025, he signed a contract extension with Atalanta. Having regularly appeared as an unused substitute in both domestic and European competitions, he eventually made his first-team debut on 22 May 2026, during a 1–1 away Serie A draw to Fiorentina.

==== Loan to Palermo ====
On 1 August 2026, Vavassori joined Serie B side Palermo on loan.

== International career ==
Born in Italy to a Brazilian father and a Polish mother, Vavassori played for Italy youth national teams, starting from the U20 side. He was then first called to the Italy U21 in November 2025.

In May 2026, he was first called to the national senior team for the training camp preceding the friendlies against Greece and Luxembourg, as interim coach Silvio Baldini decided to focus on young players after Italy failed to qualify for the World Cup.

He made his debut with the Italy U21 on 8 June 2026, in a friendly match won 1–0 against Albania.
