= Luca D'Angelo =

Italian footballer & manager (born 1971)

Personal information
- Date of birth: 26 July 1971 (age 55)
- Place of birth: Pescara, Italy
- Height: 1.88 m (6 ft 2 in)
- Position: Defender

Team information
- Current team: Sampdoria (head coach)

Youth career
- 1988–1989: Chieti

Senior career*
Years	Team	Apps	(Gls)
1989–1995	Chieti	103	(2)
1995–1996	Sora	28	(2)
1996–1998	Castel di Sangro	62	(4)
1998–2000	Fermana	40	(0)
2000	Alzano Virescit	4	(0)
2000	Fermana	2	(0)
2000–2001	Giulianova	21	(4)
2001–2006	Rimini	130	(7)
2006–2007	San Marino	26	(2)
Total		416	(21)

Managerial career
- 2009–2010: Rimini (youth)
- 2010–2013: Rimini
- 2013–2015: Alessandria
- 2015–2016: Fidelis Andria
- 2016–2017: Bassano Virtus
- 2017–2018: Casertana
- 2018–2022: Pisa
- 2022–2023: Pisa
- 2023–2025: Spezia
- 2026: Spezia
- 2026–: Sampdoria
- * Club domestic league appearances and goals

Luca D'Angelo (born 26 July 1971) is an Italian football manager and former professional footballer who is the head coach of Serie B club Sampdoria.

== Club career ==
D'Angelo began his playing career at Chieti in the late 1980s; he collected 100 caps in Serie B with Castel di Sangro, Fermana, Alzano Virescit and Rimini.

== Coaching career ==
=== Early years ===
Following his retirement, D'Angelo began his coaching career in 2009 with Rimini youth team. Next season he was named manager of the first-team, playing in Serie D.

In November 2013, he replaced Egidio Notaristefano as manager of the Lega Pro side Alessandria.

In July 2015, he signed a one-year contract for the 2015–16 season with Lega Pro side Fidelis Andria. After finishing the season at 7th place, on 7 May he announced that he wouldn't renewed his contract with the club.

For the 2016–17 season, he was appointed as the new coach of Bassano Virtus.

After being dismissed in 2017, he was appointed as the manager of Casertana.

=== Pisa ===
On 24 June 2018, he became the new manager of Pisa. He obtained promotion to Serie B with the team during the 2018–19 season.

Successively, he guided Pisa for three Serie B campaigns, the last of which saw the Tuscan side fighting for a Serie A spot, ending the regular season in third place, just one point out of direct promotion. They ultimately made it to the promotion playoffs, where they were defeated by Monza in a two-legged final after extra time. A few days later, Pisa announced that they had parted ways with D'Angelo after four seasons.

On 19 September 2022, following the dismissal of his successor Rolando Maran, he was rehired as Pisa manager. On 2 June 2023, after completing the 2022–23 Serie B season in a mid-table placement and failing to qualify for the promotion playoffs, Pisa announced the dismissal of D'Angelo for a second time.

=== Spezia ===
On 15 November 2023, Serie B club Spezia announced that it had appointed D'Angelo as their new head coach in place of Massimiliano Alvini.

After saving Spezia from relegation in the 2023–24 Serie B, D'Angelo guided the Ligurian club to third place in the league the following season, making it to the promotion playoff finals, where they eventually lost to Cremonese. D'Angelo's time as Spezia head coach ended on 4 November 2025, following a disappointing start to the 2025–26 Serie B season. On 23 March 2026, he was reinstated as Spezia head coach following Roberto Donadoni's departure.

=== Sampdoria ===
On 22 October 2026, Serie B club Sampdoria announced that it had appointed D'Angelo as their new head coach in place of Bernardo Corradi.

== Managerial statistics ==
As of match played 8 November 2025

Managerial record by team and tenure
Team	From	To	Record							
Team	From	To	G	W	D	L	GF	GA	GD	Win %
Rimini	19 July 2010	30 June 2013	129	54	40	35	178	136	+42	41.86
Alessandria	5 November 2013	10 June 2015	67	33	18	16	105	65	+40	49.25
Fidelis Andria	4 July 2015	15 June 2016	36	12	12	12	36	26	+10	33.33
Bassano Virtus	15 June 2016	28 February 2017	31	11	11	9	42	46	−4	35.48
Casertana	1 October 2017	18 June 2018	35	14	11	10	39	30	+9	40.00
Pisa	24 June 2018	14 June 2022	173	72	56	45	239	202	+37	41.62
Pisa	19 September 2022	2 June 2023	32	11	12	9	41	31	+10	34.38
Spezia	15 November 2023	4 November 2025	82	29	33	20	108	89	+19	35.37
Total			585	236	193	156	788	625	+163	40.34
