= Matteo Andreoletti =

Italian footballer and coach (born 1976)

Personal information
- Date of birth: 30 January 1989 (age 37)
- Place of birth: Alzano Lombardo, Italy
- Height: 1.81 m (5 ft 11 in)
- Position: Goalkeeper

Team information
- Current team: Empoli (head coach)

Youth career
- Atalanta

Senior career*
Years	Team	Apps	(Gls)
2008–2010	Atalanta	0	(0)
2008–2009	→ Lecco (loan)	9	(0)
2009–2010	→ Pro Sesto (loan)	19	(0)
2010	→ Lecco (loan)	2	(0)
2010–2012	Pro Patria	33	(0)
2013	Verbano	17	(0)

Managerial career
- 2016: Seregno
- 2016–2018: Seregno
- 2018–2019: Inveruno
- 2021–2022: Sanremese
- 2022–2023: Pro Sesto
- 2023: Benevento
- 2024–2026: Padova
- 2026–: Empoli
- * Club domestic league appearances and goals

Matteo Andreoletti (born 30 January 1989) is an Italian professional football coach and a former player. He is currently the head coach of Serie B club Empoli.

== Playing career ==
A goalkeeper, Andreoletti started his career in the youth ranks of Atalanta, winning a Torneo di Viareggio with them but never managing to break through the first team, eventually ending up playing in the minor leagues with Lecco, Pro Sesto and Pro Patria before retiring at the age of 23.

== Coaching career ==
In July 2013, Andreoletti was named new goalkeeping coach of Lecco. After a short stint in charge of the Under-19 team of Pro Patria, in May 2016 he was named new head coach of Serie D club Seregno. After a brief dismissal in December 2016 and a following reappointment in charge of the team shortly afterwards, Andreoletti was removed from his managerial duties in February 2018 due to poor results.

In May 2018, Andreoletti was hired as the new head coach of Serie D club Inveruno, a role he maintained until December 2019 after having guided the small club to its best season in history.

In January 2021, Andreoletti returned to management as the new head coach of Sanremese in the Serie D league. After achieving a fifth and a second place with Sanremese, Andreoletti departed from the club by the end of the 2021–22 season. Shortly afterwards, he took over at Serie C club Pro Sesto, a former team of his as a player, in what was going to be his first coaching experience with a professional side.

His debut Serie C season with Pro Sesto gave him significant visibility as his club performed beyond expectations, ending in fourth place; those performances led to Benevento making him an offer, and eventually appointing him as their new head coach for the club's 2023–24 Serie C season. His stint at Benevento, however, did not prove to be as successful, and he was eventually dismissed in December 2023 due to poor results.

On 14 June 2024, Andreoletti took over at ambitious Serie C club Padova, signing a two-year contract. His first season at Padova ended in triumph as he guided the Biancoscudati to win the Serie C Group A title and get promoted to Serie B. In doing so, he became the youngest coach ever to win a Serie C title. He left Padova on 21 March 2026 after a series of poor results.

On 30 September 2026, he was appointed as the new head coach of Serie B club Empoli, signing a two-year contract.

== Honours ==
=== Manager ===
Padova

- Serie C: 2024–25 (Group A)
