= Guido Pagliuca =

Italian footballer and manager

Personal information
- Date of birth: 17 February 1976 (age 50)
- Place of birth: Cecina, Italy
- Position: Right-back

Team information
- Current team: Carrarese (head coach)

Senior career*
Years	Team	Apps	(Gls)
- Cecina

Managerial career
- 2007–2010: Cecina
- 2010–2011: Borgo a Buggiano
- 2011: Gavorrano
- 2012–2013: RapalloBogliasco
- 2013–2014: Lucchese
- 2015–2016: Imolese
- 2016–2017: Real Forte Querceta
- 2018–2019: Ghivizzano
- 2020–2021: Pianese
- 2021–2022: Lucchese
- 2022–2023: Siena
- 2023–2025: Juve Stabia
- 2025: Empoli
- 2026: Empoli
- 2026–: Carrarese
- * Club domestic league appearances and goals

Guido Pagliuca (born 17 February 1976) is an Italian professional football manager and former player who played as a defender.

== Career ==
After a modest playing career as a right-back that was cut short by an injury, Pagliuca retired at the age of 28 to become a youth coach at amateur club Rosignano. He successively returned at hometown club Cecina, first as a youth coach and then in 2007 as a head coach, providing an attacking footballing style to a Serie D league team. In 2010 he left for Borgo a Buggiano, winning promotion to Lega Pro Seconda Divisione for the first time in the club's history. After that, he signed for fellow Lega Pro Seconda Divisione club Gavorrano, being however sacked in November 2011.

For the 2012–13 season, Pagliuca returned to Serie D to coach RapalloBogliasco before being sacked in January 2013. In the following season, he signed for fellow Serie D club Lucchese, guiding them to promotion to the 2014–15 Lega Pro after a last-minute win against rivals Correggese in the final game of the season. After being initially confirmed in charge of the club for the upcoming Lega Pro season, he was sacked in November 2014 due to poor results.

In October 2015, Pagliuca took over at Serie D club Imolese.

After not being confirmed in charge of Imolese, Pagliuca signed in September 2016 for fellow Serie D club Real Forte Querceta; he was dismissed a year later, in September 2017, due to negative results at the beginning of the new season.

In July 2018, Pagliuca took over at Ghivizzano, another Tuscan Serie D club, before being replaced in March 2019.

In October 2019, Pagliuca joined Marco Baroni as part of his coaching staff at Serie B club Cremonese, leaving the club following Baroni's dismissal in January 2020.

In 2020, he returned to head coaching, this time at the Serie D club Pianese. In April 2021, Pianese announced to have parted ways with Pagliuca due to "disciplinary reasons".

In July 2021, Pagliuca returned to Lucchese, this time in Serie C, guiding the club to a spot in the promotion playoffs. On 29 June 2022, Pagliuca left Lucchese to sign for fellow Tuscan Serie C club Siena. After guiding Siena to an impressive season despite a number of financial issues that eventually led to the club's exclusion from professional football, Pagliuca was hired by Juve Stabia. On 8 April 2024, Juve Stabia mathematically won promotion to Serie B after being crowned Group C champions.

In his debut Serie B season, Pagliuca guided Juve Stabia, a team composed of youngsters and mostly expected to be fighting to escape relegation, to a fifth place in the league and a spot in the promotion playoffs, where they qualified to the semifinals after eliminating Palermo in the first round.

In June 2025, Pagliuca left Juve Stabia by mutual consent, successively joined recently-relegated Serie B club Empoli. His stint at Empoli was however short-lived, as he was dismissed on 14 October 2025 following a lacklustre start of the season.

On 6 July 2026, Pagliuca was hired by Empoli again. On 28 September 2026, he left Empoli by mutual consent after starting the season with 2 wins and 3 losses in the first 5 league games.

== Honours ==
=== Managerial ===
Borgo a Buggiano

- Serie D: 2010–11 (Group D)

Lucchese

- Serie D: 2013–14 (Group D)

Juve Stabia

- Serie C: 2023–24 (Group C)
