= Football derbies in Italy =

This is a list of the major football derbies in Italy.

Some derbies have developed on the basis of intra-city rivalries (locally called stracittadine), others on a regional basis, and others are formed due to sporting or political rivalry and have little to do with geographical proximity.

== City derbies and their history ==
Early Italian football was characterised by numerous matches between teams of the same cities, as teams would have needed to compete in regional preliminary phases in order to compete at the national level.

During the 1920s, the fascist leaders noted the great propaganda potential in what had become the first national sport. Most Italian cities were restricted to only a single club that could play professionally, although this rule was relaxed in three major cities of Northern Italy: Genoa, Milan and Turin, places where Italian football was born, which meant that the individual clubs' cultures were by that point too ingrained to be restricted. Further, due to the strong resistance of Lazio to join Roma, the same treatment was accorded to Rome, the capital.

The first derby in the Italian top flight was played in Turin on 8 May 1898 between the F.B.C. Torinese and Internazionale F.C. Torino, teams that would merge to create Torino Football Club.

When the Serie A began in 1929, three derbies were played in the top flight, which became four in 1935–36. Eighty years later, a fifth derby took place for the first time in 2001–02 when former amateur side Chievo contested the Verona Derby with the more traditional Hellas Verona.

The following city derbies are those that have been played at least once in Serie A.

- Derby della Lanterna (Derby of the Lighthouse): Italy's oldest derby sees Genoa clash with Sampdoria. Sampdoria was formed in 1946, but other clubs from the city (which became the modern day Sampdoria) have contested the derby against Genoa since 1902. These teams are Andrea Doria, Sampierdarenese, Liguria Football Club and La Dominante.
- Derby della Madonnina (Derby of the Madonna): Inter against Milan was the only intra-city derby in which both sides have won the European Cup, up until Manchester City's win in 2023
- Derby della Capitale (Derby of the Capital): Lazio play Roma in a derby that was first contested in 1929 in which Roma were victorious.
- Derby della Mole (Derby of the Mole Antonelliana): Juventus and Torino contest the derby of Turin, which stretches back to 1907 and is Italy's longest running derby featuring the same sides.
- Derby della Scala (Derby of the Scaligers): Italy's newest city derby is between Chievo and Verona and was held for the first time in the Serie B in 1994.
- Neapolitan derby: S.S.C. Napoli vs A.S.D. Atletico Calvizzano vs Stella Napoli vs FC Napoli Nord
- Florentine derby: ACF Fiorentina vs S.S.D. Rondinella Marzocco
- Palermitano derby: Palermo FC vs S.S.D. Athletic Club Palermo

== Major inter-city ==
The following derbies have also been played in Serie A.

- Derby d'Italia (Derby of Italy): Internazionale–Juventus: a term coined by journalist Gianni Brera to identify the match between the two most successful sides in Italian football.
- Derby del Sole (Derby of the Sun): Napoli–Roma: these became the first two clubs in Central Italy and Southern Italy to be admitted to the National Division in 1926–27.
- Derby dell'Appennino (Apennines Derby): Bologna–Fiorentina: Bologna is the largest city and the administrative seat of Emilia-Romagna, while Florence is the largest city and the administrative seat of Tuscany. The two cities are separated by the Apennines. This match was played for first time in the 1926–27 "Prima divisione" championship, Fiorentina's inaugural season in the top flight. The fierce rivalry between the supporters of the two sides dates from the Seventies, the first years of the "Ultras" subculture. Most violent clashes happened in 1988–89 Serie A season, when Fiorentina's supporters threw molotov cocktails at the train carrying hundreds of Bologna's visiting supporters to Florence. A 14-year-old boy was heavily injured, and the angry Bologna supporters paraded to the stadium causing brawls and damages.
- Derby delle Due Sicilie (Two Sicilies Derby): Palermo–Napoli
- Derby delle Isole (Islands Derby): Palermo–Cagliari
- Derby di Sicilia (Sicilian derby): Palermo–Catania
- Derby dello Stretto (Derby of the Strait): Messina–Reggina
- Derby dell'Emilia (Emilia Derby): Bologna–Parma: these are the two largest clubs in Emilia, although first appearance in Serie A was in 1990, Parma's first year in the top flight.
- Derby dell'Enza (Enza Derby) or Derby del Grana (Parmesan Cheese Derby): Parma–Reggiana: the river of the same name divides the provincial boundaries of Parma with those of Reggio Emilia. It was played for the first time in Serie A in 1993.
- ACF Fiorentina–Juventus F.C. rivalry: Fiorentina–Juventus
- Juventus F.C.–A.C. Milan rivalry: Juventus–Milan
- Juventus F.C.–S.S.C. Napoli rivalry: Juventus–Napoli
- Juventus F.C.–A.S. Roma rivalry: Juventus–Roma

== Minor provincial derbies ==
In Italy, there are 107 provinces. The following derbies are intra-provincial derbies.

=== Alessandria Province ===
- Alessandria Derby: Alessandria–Casale, playing major until the 1930s in CONI Cup 1927, was held in the final at the Stadio Olimpico. Previous derbies in Serie A and Serie B.

=== Ascoli Piceno ===
- Derby del Tronto or the Piceno: Ascoli–Sambenedettese, the major derby for both sets of fans, a heated football match. Always citizens of San Benedetto del Tronto assert their autonomy from the capital Piceno. This turned derby was played in Serie B seasons 1976–77, 1977–78 and 1985–86.

=== Bari ===
- Derby of Bari (I): Bari–Fidelis Andria derby played in Serie B when Andria was still part of the Province of Bari.
- Derby of Bari (II): Bari–Barletta derby played in Serie B and Serie C when Barletta was still part of the Province of Bari

=== Como ===
- Derby del Lario: Como–Lecco, was played several times Serie B when Lecco was still part of the Province of Como. It's a duel between the two branches of Lake Como and Volta to that of Manzoni.

=== Florence ===
- Derby Arno: Fiorentina–Empoli, now considered a derby stracittadino. The real derby Florence would be Fiorentina–Rondinella.
- Empoli–Prato Derby Empoli–Prato, held in 1949–50 Serie B when Prato was part of the province of Florence.

=== Forlì ===
- Derby of the Riviera: Cesena–Rimini, held in Serie B seasons 1977–78, 1978–79 and 1980–81 when Rimini was still part of the province of Forlì.

=== Lecce ===
- Salento Derby: Lecce–Gallipoli, is dispute for the first time in the league of Serie B 2009–10.

=== Lucca ===
- Derby of the Lucca: Lucchese–Viareggio extremely dangerous having some of the historical precedents, especially in twenties and thirties. "In May 1920 a bad refereeing the football match between the team and the town of Lucca lights the fuse to a popular upheaval that autoelegge Viareggio Republic isolating it completely for three days". There are precedents in the seasons Serie A 1934–35 and Serie B 1935–36, and in the second level of the Italian soccer league in the twenties.

=== Modena ===
- Modena–Sassuolo Derby Modena–Sassuolo, not a long-lasting rivalry, but it started to have some relevance to recent precedents as Sassuolo has established themselves at a higher level. It was in fact played in Serie B 2008–09 and 2012–13.
- Modena–Carpi Derby Modena–Carpi, Another minor local rivalry, featured in Serie B 2013–14 and 2014–15 seasons.
- Sassuolo–Carpi Derby Sassuolo–Carpi, Another minor local rivalry, featured in Serie A 2015–16 season.

=== Naples ===
- Derby del Golfo (Derby of the Gulf): Napoli–Juve Stabia is the biggest derby in Naples metropolitan area. They last played each other in official game in 2005–06 Serie C1 season.
- Napoli–Savoia Derby, Napoli–Savoia was played for the first time 24 December 1939, during the knockout phase of the Italian Cup from 1939 to 1940, the score was 1–3 Savoy Naples. In the only previous league games dating back to the championship 1999–2000 Serie B, when the Naples returned to Serie A and the Savoy relegated to Serie C1. The results were Savoia-Napoli 0–1

=== Padua ===
- Saints Derby or Padua Derby: Padua–Cittadella, is played for the first time in championship Serie B in 2009–10 after several derbies in Serie C1, and also in 2000 in 2002 when Cittadella played in Padua its first two seasons in Serie B. At the dawn of Italian football is also played in the derby Padua and Petrarca.

=== Salerno ===
- Nocerina–Salernitana Derby, played in the Southern League 1928–29 (forerunner of today's Serie B)
- Salernitana–Scafatese Derby, played in Serie B 1946–1947
- Nocerina–Scafatese Derby, played in Serie B 1947–48

=== Varese ===
- Derby Varese: Varese–Pro Patria, derby between the team and the capital of the Busto Arsizio, a city that for years has ambitions to become the capital of the province.

=== Vicenza ===
- Derby di Vicenza or Derby della Lana (Wool Derby): Lanerossi Vicenza–A.C. Marzotto. It was played mostly between the two world wars in the third series, but also in Serie B in the early 1950s. The rivalry between Vicenza and Valdagno, despite not officially meeting for decades, is still on, so that in a few bars of Valdagno is still served a cocktail called "Cinqueazero" ("Fivetozero") in memory of a victory of Marzotto in the 1940s.

== Minor regional derbies ==
In Italy, there are 20 regions. The following derbies are intra-regional derbies.

=== Abruzzo ===
The only derby in Abruzzo that have been played in Serie B is the one between Pescara and Virtus Lanciano in 2013–2014, 2014–2015 and 2015–2016 and the other one between Pescara and Castel di Sangro in 1996–97 and 1997–98 (Serie B).

=== Apulia ===
In general, the challenges between the three most famous teams of the region (Bari, Lecce and Foggia) played in Serie A. Featured:

- Apulian Derby: Bari–Lecce, the match between the two most important teams of Apulia, in the second half of the 1990s.
- Derby of the Murgia: Taranto–Bari, the main centers of region. Due to the different fortunes of the two teams, the derby is no longer played at the official level by 1993.
- Derby of Apulia: Foggia–Bari has been played in the top division in 1991–92, 1993–94 and 1994–95.

=== Calabria ===
- Derby della Calabria: any game between the teams of Catanzaro, Cosenza, Reggina and Crotone. The derby between Catanzaro and Cosenza, considered the quintessential derby, the first Calabrian derby was played in Serie B in 1946. After that, historically another derby on and heard from both sets of fans since the early 60 'has always been Cosenza-Reggina, also played in Serie B, but since the 1988–89 season.
- Derby of the former province of Catanzaro: Catanzaro-Crotone is the former derby in the province of Catanzaro in Croton there was a part before the '90s. This game was played in Serie B only in seasons 2004–05 and 2005–06.
- Derby of Ancient Greece: Reggina-Crotone played in Serie B since 2001, ended in a tie except for 2010 where the victory of amaranth slowed the run of the Pythagoreans to the play-offs and another win there amaranth is in the Italian Cup in 2013 1–0. Then Scida historic victory at 2–0 Crotone at home against Reggina after 37 years from the previous victory in October 2013.

In addition to those listed the only other derby Calabrian played at least in Serie B is between Cosenza and Crotone in Serie B 2000–01, 2001–02,2018–19 and 2019–20

=== Campania ===
Historically, the biggest football event of the region is the Derby della Campania, that is the challenge that confronts two teams from Avellino, Napoli and Salerno.

- Napoli–Salernitana
- Avellino–Napoli
- Avellino–Salernitana

Other derby Campania, at least those played in Serie B also involve Juve Stabia, Nocerina and Savoia, and are the following:

- Avellino–Juve Stabia
- Juve Stabia–Nocerina
- Juve Stabia–Salernitana
- Salernitana–Savoia

=== Emilia-Romagna ===
- Emilia–Romagna Derby: Bologna (Emilia's most reputable club, which is based in the region's largest city and Emilia-Romagna's administrative city) take on Cesena (traditionally the strongest team in Romagna) in a clash that has occurred on a regular basis since the 1970s in Serie A and Serie B
- Derby of Via Emilia: all matches between Piacenza, Parma, Reggiana, Modena, Bologna and Cesena, the fiercest of which are the Emilia–Romagna Derby (see above); the River Secchia Derby (see below); the Derby d'Emilia (see above); the Derby dell'Enza (see above); and the Duchy Derby (see below), although Piacenza feels a certain distance from regional rivalries, cultivating stronger rivalries with teams from southern Lombardy, such as Cremonese, Pavia and Mantova
- Duchy Derby: Piacenza and Parma's cities once formed the Duchy of Parma
- River Secchia Derby: Modena and Reggiana sit in the provinces of Reggio and Modena, which are divided by the River Secchia
- Derby of The Stolen Bucket: Bologna and Modena
- Derby of the Riviera: Rimini and Ravenna met in Serie B in 2007–08
- Derby di Romagna: Cesena's matches against Rimini and Ravenna
- Derby Cesena–Sassuolo: the newest of Serie A Emilia-Romagna derbies, it was played for the first time in the top flight in 2014–15

=== Friuli–Venezia Giulia ===
- Derby of the Northeast: Udinese–Triestina, which match see opposing capitals of the regions historical and geographic Friuli and Venezia Giulia, and also the only two regional clubs to ever be landed in Serie A. They competed for 7 seasons in Serie A since 1950–51 to 1958–59.

=== Lazio ===
The only derby between two teams of Lazio which was held only in the top is The Rome Derby.

- Derby del Romano–Ciociaro: Roma/Lazio–Frosinone, these derbies were played for the first time in history in the 2015–16 Serie A season.
- Derby of the Lower Lazio: Frosinone–Latina, meeting strongly felt in both provinces, which confronts two realities very different regional, such as Ciociaria (Frosinone) and Pontine (Latina). Played for years in lower categories, it was played in Serie B for the first time in 2014-15.

=== Liguria ===
Since the early days of football in Italy, Liguria has been breeding ground for numerous teams and have therefore many derbies between teams of Liguria in Serie A and Serie B:

- Virtus Entella–Spezia, which took place several times in the minor leagues and in Serie B 2014–2015; is felt mainly by the fans of the first club.
- Genoa–Savona Derby, held on several occasions between the 1910s and 1920s and only twice since the advent of the championships in a single round: Serie B 1966–1967 and Serie C 1970–1971.
- Genoa–Spezia Derby, a meeting that traces its roots back to the 1920s, and was played in Serie B in a single round only in the 2006–07 season. After the head-to-head at the top of the Serie C1 league in 2005–2006, the rivalry has been rekindled.
- Sampdoria–Savona Derby, held in a single season in Serie B in 1966–67.
- Sanremese–Spezia Derby, held in Serie A in the 1930s and several other times in the minor leagues.
- Savona–Sestrese Derby, held in Serie B 1946–1947 and numerous minor leagues.
- Savona–Spezia Derby, held in Serie B in 1940s and several other times in the minor leagues.
- Sestrese–Spezia Derby, held in Serie B in 1946–1947 and in numerous minor championships.

Three teams have now disappeared, Gymnastics Club Sampierdarenese, Liguria Football Club and La Dominante disputed derbies with the other teams in Liguria in Serie A or Serie B.

=== Lombardy ===
- Derby of Lombardy: Brescia–Atalanta fierce rivalry between two industrial centres of Lombardy, historically linked by their common origin in the ancient Celtic tribe of Cenomani, a background that is reflected in the similarity between the dialects of the two cities, distinct from those of the surrounding provinces. The pride of belonging to the city intensifies the rivalry.
- Inter Milan–Atalanta Derby
- Inter Milan–Brescia Derby
- A.C. Milan–Atalanta
- Derby di Bergamo: Atalanta–AlbinoLeffe: prior to this match being played in Serie B, Atalanta's games against AlzanoCene were considered the derby, but the clear domination of support for Atalanta meant the rivalry was weak.
- Derby del Lario: Como–Lecco, until some time ago it was considered a provincial rivalry; since 1993, with the creation of the province of Lecco, has become a clash between two independent realities which continues also in non-football. It is a duel between the two branches of Lake Como to Volta and the Manzoni. The two sides met several times in the Serie B and Serie C but never in the top flight.
- Derby Insubria: Como–Varese, is one of the most heated rivalry in the west of Italy, so as to be considered risky even in the lower categories. After years of involvement in different series teams have found themselves in the Lega Pro Seconda Divisione 2008–09 season.
- Derby dell'Altomilanese: Pro Patria–Legnano clash between the two cities has always been in search of their own autonomy, which should be close to the current submission Varese and Milan. The rivalry has historical roots that finds traces in the communal. Both companies have in the past Serie A and four times they met in the top flight.
- Derby Como–Monza, defined as the "hottest derby in Serie B", the rivalry dates back to 1967, when Monza beat Como in a decisive promotion play-off match for the Serie B. In 1980, a 3–3 draw between the two ultimately killed Monza's chance of promotion to the Serie A; violence ensued between the two opposing fans.
- Derby Monza–Pro Sesto, linked to the rivalry geographical proximity between the two cities. Historically, the two sides have had a tradition of beating the other away from home.
- Derby Cremonese–Mantova, in recent years, with the fall of grigiorossi in the lower divisions, it has become one of the most heated rivalries in the north of Italy, so as to be considered risky. Numerous meetings were held in the early 2000s in Second Division after years of militancy in different series.
- Derby Violin: Cremonese–Brescia, the historic rivalry on and also though with a few noteworthy episodes in recent years in view of the changing fortunes of the two teams.
- Derby of Garda: Brescia–Feralpisalò.

=== Marche ===
- The derby hotter and heard is that between Ancona and Ascoli. It represents the clash between the two teams most qualified at the regional level, the only ones to have achieved, although at different times, the championship of Italian Cup.
- The Vis Pesaro–Alma Fano derby, with the cities of Pesaro and Fano only 10 km apart.
- Fermana Calcio–Sambenedettese
- Of all the derby Marche, the only ones to have been played in the second division are: Ancona–Ascoli, Ancona–Sambenedettese (only in the 1988–89 season), Ascoli–Sambenedettese (in the seasons 1976–77, 1977–78 and 1985–86) and Ancona–Maceratese (only in the 1940–41 season).

=== Piedmont ===
- Rice Derby: Novara–Pro Vercelli, held in back to Serie B in the 2012–13 season after the last previous away Serie B 1947–48 season. There are precedents in the first level of the football league at the beginning of the last century.
- Eastern Piedmont Derby: Pro Vercelli–Casale, earlier they were both in Serie A and in B in the first half of the last century.

=== Sardinia ===
- Sardinian Derby: Torres–Cagliari, the two largest teams in Sardinia, it represents the cities of Cagliari and Sassari.

=== Sicily ===
- Other Sicilian derbies are deeply felt among fans islanders also encounters Palermo–Messina and Catania–Messina, played in Serie A, and the following played at least Serie A a single group:
  - Catania–Siracusa (Serie B, 1949–1950, 1950–1951, 1951–1952, 1952–1953)
  - Messina–Siracusa (Serie A 1950–1951, 1951–1952, 1952–1953)
  - Palermo–Trapani (Serie B 2013–2014)

=== Tuscany ===
- Derby Guelph–Ghibelline: Fiorentina–Siena, the game felt much more by fans of Siena. The province of Siena is the one with the highest number of purple fans after the province of Florence, it is therefore a "derby derby" as if the city were playing against Siena Siena province.
- Livorno–Pisa Derby, is different from the various Tuscan derby because of the historic rivalry between the two the city. In Italy it is one of the challenges of high risk of public policy.
- Fiorentina–Pisa, deeply felt on both sides, and despite the rivalry felt ever more part of Pisa is the one with the "cousins" of the Livorno, some sections of the fans neroazzurra point out that in fact their true derby is the one with the '"hated" Fiorentina.
- Pistoiese–Prato Derby, is a very sensitive derby between the two cities, there have been numerous clashes between rival supporters.
- Derby Medici: Fiorentina–Livorno, holds the record of being the Tuscan derby most played in the top flight Italian football with 32 games (16 seasons).
- Livorno–Siena Derby: Livorno–Siena, strong rivalry since the 1950s between the two sides.
- Forum Derby: Lucchese–Pisa has become very important because this challenge in recent years has been very often. It is strongly felt by both sets of fans.
- Derby Siena–Empoli, the rivalry between the two sides.
- Derby Saline: Grosseto–Siena, the rivalry between the capital city of the Palio Maremma and the related a historical hatred between the two cities that began in the Middle Ages, as Siena attacked and subdued Grosseto four times to steal economic hegemony in the salt marshes of the coast. The last meeting between the two teams dates back to the 2010–2011 Serie B championship.
- Derby Livorno–Lucchese, strong rivalry.
- Derby of Archipelago Grosseto–Livorno, a challenge that is held for the first time in the Serie A championship 2008–2009, after 30 years of no official challenges between the two teams.
- Pisa–Empoli, the rivalry between the two sides.
- Derby Pisano: Pisa–Pontedera, considered a derby "light", with no disagreements or issues of public policy, strongly felt by the fans and very little from those of Pontedera Pisa.
- Derby Empoli–Prato: it was considered a provincial derby until 1993, when Prato became an independent province (previously it was part of the Province of Florence). It was played only one time in 1949–50 Serie B season.
- Other Tuscan derby: they felt most of the matches between the teams numerous Tuscan (Arezzo, Carrarese, Empoli, Fiorentina, Grosseto, Livorno, Lucchese, Massese, Pisa, Pistoiese, Prato, Siena, Viareggio), in particular the provincial derby between Massese and Carrarese.

=== Trentino-South Tyrol ===
- Tyrolean Derby: FC Südtirol–AC Trento, the derby represents the clash between the two major realities of the Italian part of Tyrol.
- Derby of Trentino-South Tyrol: AC Trento - AC Virtus Bolzano, the derby between the two capitals of the two Provinces (South Tyrol and Trentino) in Trentino-South Tyrol.

=== Umbria ===
- Derby of Umbria: Perugia–Ternana a sentimental derby and at high risk of incidents, while not having never played in the Serie A is the clash between the two largest clubs in Umbria.

There used to be another local club based in Terni, Sporting Terni, but its existence was short lived.

=== Veneto ===
- Veneto Derby: Hellas Verona–Vicenza, the derby between the two sides is fierce to the point of being extremely violent. It is a derby whose origins date back to a strong rivalry between the two cities as far back as the Middle Ages. Played several times in Serie A.
- Other Veneto derby: Other strong rivalries are between Padua–Vicenza, Padua–Venezia, Hellas Verona–Venezia and Vicenza–Venezia that have been played in Serie A, and Treviso–Venezia which was played at the most in Serie B. the other derby Venetians were to be played in Serie A, as well as the Derby della Scala are Hellas Verona–Padua, Treviso–Chievo and Venezia–Chievo.

== Other rivalries ==
The following derbies span multiple regions.

- Derby of Central Italy: Fiorentina–Lazio or Roma, the competition between the major football clubs of Central Italy.
- Derby of Southern Italy: Napoli–Catanzaro, during the seventies has been considered one of the most important derbies in Southern Italy.
- Derby Mezzogiorno: Bari–Napoli.
- Derby Garda: Hellas Verona–Brescia.
- Derby Triveneto: Triestina–Vicenza.
- Derby Po Piacenza–Cremonese, Piacenza Emilia south bank of the Po, Cremona, Lombardy the north bank of the Po, is distinguished because of the historic rivalry between the two cities, which is only thirty km. To the fans of both teams is considered as the derby heard in the context of their rivalry.
- Tuscan–Ligurian Derby: Pisa–Spezia.
- Derby Etruria (or Umbrian–Tuscan derby): Perugia–Arezzo born in the 1970s for purely sporting reasons, the challenge is sentitissima and considered a derby in effect, also because of the relative proximity between the two cities.
- Derby of Polesine: SPAL–Rovigo.
- Derby of the Adriatic: Ancona–Pescara.
- Derby Lunense: Carrarese–Spezia.
- Derby of the Ionian Sea: Crotone–Taranto.
- Derby of the Northwest: Genoa–Torino.
- Derby Bourbon: Foggia–Napoli.
- Derby Mincio: Mantova–Hellas Verona.
- Derby of the Strait of Messina: Reggina–Messina.
- Derby of the Umbrian–Marchean Apennines: Ascoli–Ternana.

== See also ==
- Association football and politics
- Football hooliganism in Italy
- France–Italy football rivalry
- Germany–Italy football rivalry
- Italy–Spain football rivalry
