= Giorgio Gorgone =

Italian footballer

Personal information
- Date of birth: 18 August 1976 (age 50)
- Place of birth: Rome, Italy
- Height: 1.76 m (5 ft 9 in)
- Position: Midfielder

Youth career
- Lodigiani

Senior career*
Years	Team	Apps	(Gls)
1994–1998	Lodigiani	75	(2)
1998–1999	Lucchese	33	(1)
1999–2000	Alzano Virescit	26	(1)
2000–2002	Chievo	17	(0)
2002–2003	Cagliari	34	(1)
2003–2004	Pescara	16	(1)
2004	Cagliari	0	(0)
2004–2005	Perugia	16	(0)
2005–2011	Triestina	125	(3)

Managerial career
- 2023–2025: Lucchese
- 2025–2026: Pescara
- 2026: Catanzaro
- * Club domestic league appearances and goals

Giorgio Gorgone (born 18 August 1976) is an Italian professional football coach and former player in the role of midfielder.

== Playing career ==
Gorgone made his professional debut in 1994 with Lodigiani and successively left the Roman club in 1998 to join Serie B club Lucchese. His career then went on in Italy's minor leagues, up to Serie B, with Chievo, Cagliari, Pescara and Perugia.

== Coaching career ==
In 2012, after a season as a youth coach for Triestina, Gorgone agreed to join Roberto Stellone as the assistant coach of Frosinone. He successively followed Stellone on his coaching endeavours at Bari, Palermo, Ascoli and Arezzo.

In 2021, he returned to Frosinone as a youth coach. In 2023, he took on his first head coaching role at Serie C club Lucchese. He left Lucchese in 2025 after the club was excluded from the league due to financial issues.

On 12 November 2025, he was unveiled as the new head coach of Serie B club Pescara, succeeding Vincenzo Vivarini.

On 24 October 2026, He was dismissed by the Catanzaro after the club started the season with 4 point in 8 games.
