= Andrea Chiappella =

Italian footballer and coach (born 1976)

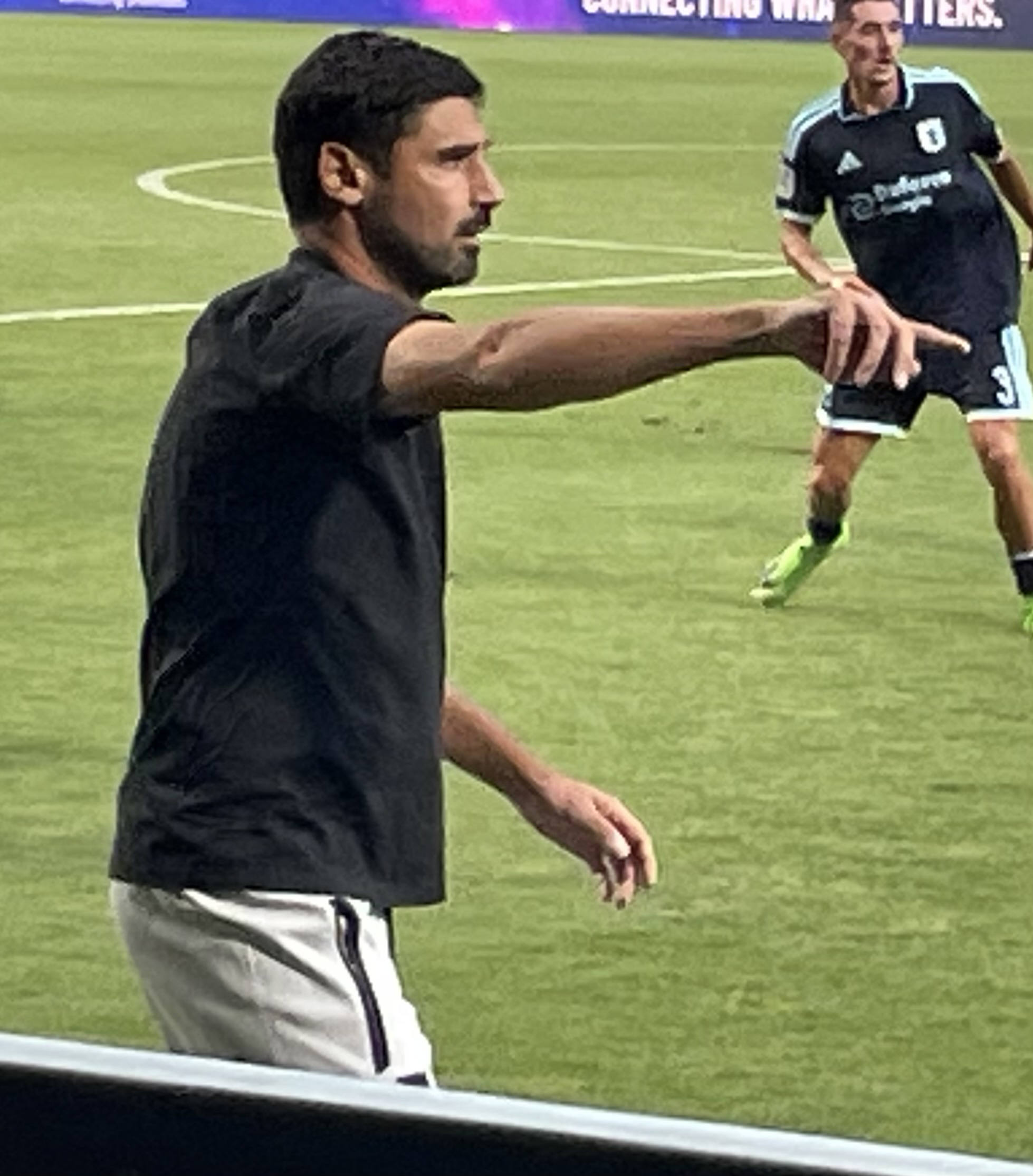

Personal information
- Full name: Andrea Chiappella
- Date of birth: 30 January 1989 (age 37)
- Place of birth: Paullo, Italy
- Position: Centre-back

Team information
- Current team: Virtus Entella (head coach)

Senior career*
Years	Team	Apps	(Gls)
–2008	Tribiano		
2008–2014	Giana Erminio		
2014–2015	Crema		

Managerial career
- 2022–2025: Giana Erminio
- 2025–: Virtus Entella
- * Club domestic league appearances and goals

Andrea Chiappella (born 30 January 1989) is an Italian professional football coach and a former player. He is currently the head coach of Serie B club Virtus Entella.

== Playing career ==
Chiappella's playing career saw him competing exclusively at the amateur level, most notably with Giana Erminio from 2008 to 2014, a team he also captained for several years. He left Giana in 2014, following the club's promotion to Serie C, deciding to stay at the amateur level in order to keep his job as a bank employee. He retired a year later, at the age of 27, to focus on a career as a coach.

== Coaching career ==
Soon after retirement, Chiappella was called by long-time Giana Erminio head coach (then vice-president) Cesare Albè to return to the club, this time as a youth coach in charge of the Under-19 Berretti squad. He successively took charge of the youth team in the Campionato Primavera 4 youth league, winning the title.

In 2022, Chiappella was promoted to head coach of the first team in the Serie D league, immediately bringing Giana Erminio back to Serie C in his first season. In the following seasons, he led Giana Erminio to two consecutive playoff qualifications, and also to a Coppa Italia Serie C final in 2025.

In June 2025, Chiappella left Giana Erminio by mutual consent, successively accepting the coaching job at newly-promoted Serie B club Virtus Entella.

== Honours ==
=== Player ===
Giana Erminio

- Serie D: 2013–14 (Group A)

=== Manager ===
Giana Erminio

- Serie D: 2022–23 (Group D)
