= Carrarese Calcio 1908 =

Association football club in Italy

Carrarese
- Full name: Carrarese Calcio 1908 S.r.l.
- Nicknames: Gli Azzurri (The Blues); I Giallazzurri (The Yellow-and-Blues); Gli Apuani (The Apuans); I Marmiferi (The Marbles)
- Founded: 1908; 118 years ago 2016; 10 years ago (refounded)
- Stadium: Stadio dei Marmi - IV Olimpionici Azzurri
- Capacity: 3,520
- President: Manrico Gemignani
- Head coach: Guido Pagliuca
- League: Serie B
- 2025–26: Serie B, 12th of 20
- Website: carraresecalcio1908.it
Home colours	Away colours

Carrarese Calcio 1908, commonly referred to as Carrarese, is an Italian football club based in Carrara, Tuscany. The team plays in Serie B, the second tier of Italian football, after promotion from Serie C in 2023–24.

== History ==
The club was founded in 1908.

In the season 2010–11 from Lega Pro Seconda Divisione group B, Carrarese was promoted in the play-off to Lega Pro Prima Divisione.

In 2016, Carrarese Calcio S.r.l. went bankrupt. A new company Carrarese Calcio 1908 S.r.l., successfully bid the sports title by refurbished the debt of Carrarese Calcio S.r.l.

On 9 June 2024, Carrarese secure promotion to Serie B from 2024 to 2025 season due to it winning Serie C promotion play-offs finals after defeat LR Vicenza with narrowly 1-0 aggregate 1–0 by a goal Mattia Finotto in 6th Minute and return to second tier after 76 years of absence.

== Colours and badge ==
The team's colours are light blue and yellow.

== Ownership ==
Italian international and Juventus goalkeeper Gianluigi Buffon (a native of Carrara and prominent supporter of the club) was a major shareholder of the club, as part of a consortium that acquired the club in 2010; other shareholders included former Pisa Calcio chairman Maurizio Mian and long-time Serie A striker Cristiano Lucarelli.

== Players ==
=== Current squad ===
As of 10 September 2026

Note: Flags indicate national team as defined under FIFA eligibility rules; some limited exceptions apply. Players may hold more than one non-FIFA nationality.

No.	Pos.	Nation	Player
1	GK	ITA	Semuel Pizzignacco (on loan from Monza)
2	DF	FRA	Colin Dagba
4	DF	CRO	David Vujević
5	DF	ITA	Tommaso Macchioni (on loan from Sassuolo)
6	DF	ITA	Filippo Oliana
7	MF	ITA	Niccolò Belloni
8	MF	MAR	Yanis Khafi
9	FW	ITA	Fabio Abiuso
10	MF	ITA	Tommaso Rubino (on loan from Fiorentina)
11	FW	GUI	Moustapha Cissé (on loan from Atalanta)
12	GK	ITA	Giovanni Garofani
13	DF	ITA	Fabio Andrea Ruggeri
17	MF	SLO	Luka Topalović (on loan from Inter)
18	MF	ARG	Nicolás Schiavi (captain)
20	DF	POR	Gonçalo Esteves (on loan from Catanzaro)
21	FW	ITA	Nicholas Bonfanti (on loan from Pisa)

No.	Pos.	Nation	Player
23	MF	AUT	Matthias Braunöder
27	DF	ITA	Giulio Cianti
28	MF	ITA	Jacopo Martini
30	GK	ITA	Nicola Ravaglia
32	FW	ITA	Mattia Finotto
33	DF	ITA	Filippo Reale (on loan from Roma)
41	DF	ITA	Lorenzo Romani (on loan from Fiorentina)
66	MF	ITA	Pietro Pinelli (on loan from Lazio)
70	MF	ITA	Nicolò Cudrig (on loan from Juventus Next Gen)
71	MF	ITA	Giulio Baroncelli
73	DF	SWE	Jonas Rouhi (on loan from Juventus)
77	MF	ITA	Gabriele Parlanti
78	DF	POL	Tommaso Guercio (on loan from Śląsk Wrocław)
87	GK	ITA	Stefano Mazzini
91	FW	ITA	Giacomo Marconi (on loan from Parma)

=== Out on loan ===
Note: Flags indicate national team as defined under FIFA eligibility rules; some limited exceptions apply. Players may hold more than one non-FIFA nationality.

No.	Pos.	Nation	Player
—	DF	ITA	Simone Zanon (at Pisa until 30 June 2027)
—	MF	ITA	Filippo Liberati (at Desenzano until 30 June 2027)

No.	Pos.	Nation	Player
—	FW	ITA	Federico Accornero (at Trento until 30 June 2027)

== Club staff ==
Position	Name
Head coach	(Italy) Guido Pagliuca
Assistant head coach	(Italy)
Technical assistant	(Italy)
Goalkeeping coach	(Italy)
Assistant goalkeeping coach	(Italy)
Athletic coach	(Italy)
Kitman	(Italy) Luca Zavani (Italy) Alessandro Tortelli
Health manager	(Italy) Dr. Marco Piolanti
Social doctor	(Italy) Dr. Giampaolo Poletti
Physiotherapists	(Italy) Andrea Biagini (Italy) Giacomo Schembri
Rehab coach	(Italy) Enni Belli
Podiatrist	(Italy) Diego Lori
Osteopath	(Italy) Claudio Zanetti

== Honours ==
- Coppa Italia Serie C

Winners: 1982–83
