= 2025–26 Modena FC 2018 season =

Modena FC 2018
2025–26 season
- Manager: Andrea Sottil
- Stadium: Stadio Alberto Braglia
- Serie B: 1st
- Coppa Italia: First round
- Highest home attendance: 11,112 vs Avellino
- Lowest home attendance: 10,761 vs Bari

The 2025–26 season is the 114th in the history of Modena Football Club and the club's fourth consecutive season in Serie B. Alongside the domestic league, the team is competing in the Coppa Italia. The season begins on 18 August 2025.

== Squad ==
=== Transfers In ===
Pos.	Player	Transferred from	Fee	Date	Source
DF	(Italy) Daniel Tonoli	(Italy) Pergolettese	Loan return	30 June 2025	
DF	(Croatia) Roko Vukušić	(Italy) Clodiense	Loan return	30 June 2025	
FW	(Italy) Romeo Giovannini	(Italy) Gubbio	Loan return	30 June 2025	
DF	(Italy) Edoardo Olivieri	(Italy) Pergolettese	Loan return	30 June 2025	
DF	(Morocco) Shady Oukhadda	(Italy) Benevento	Loan return	30 June 2025	
MF	(Belgium) Lukas Mondele	(Slovenia) ND Bilje	Loan return	30 June 2025	
DF	(Burkina Faso) Abdoul Guiebre	(Italy) Torres	Loan return	30 June 2025	
GK	(Argentina) Leandro Chichizola	(Italy) Spezia	Undisclosed	1 July 2025	
MF	(France) Yanis Massolin	(Belgium) Francs Borains	€700,000	2 July 2025	
MF	(Italy) Francesco Di Mariano	(Italy) Palermo	Undisclosed	23 July 2025	
MF	(Italy) Alessandro Sersanti	(Italy) Juventus Next Gen	Loan	22 August 2025	

=== Transfers Out ===
Pos.	Player	Transferred to	Fee	Date	Source
DF	(Croatia) Roko Vukušić			1 July 2025	
MF	(Italy) Edoardo Duca	(Italy) Juve Stabia		1 July 2025	
MF	(Belgium) Lukas Mondele	(Belgium) Francs Borains	Undisclosed	1 July 2025	
DF	(Brazil) Eric Botteghin			1 July 2025	
GK	(Italy) Riccardo Gagno	(Italy) Vicenza	Undisclosed	11 July 2025	
DF	(Burkina Faso) Abdoul Guiebre	(Italy) Ascoli	Undisclosed	15 July 2025	
DF	(Italy) Giovanni Zaro	(Italy) Cesena	Undisclosed	16 July 2025	
MF	(Italy) Antonio Palumbo	(Italy) Palermo	Undisclosed	23 July 2025	
FW	(Italy) Fabio Abiuso	(Italy) Carrarese	Undisclosed	14 August 2025	
FW	(Italy) Romeo Giovannini	(Italy) Vis Pesaro	Free	19 August 2025	
DF	(Morocco) Shady Oukhadda	(Italy) Casertana	Contract terminated	1 September 2025	
DF	(Italy) Edoardo Olivieri	(Italy) Foggia	Loan	1 September 2025	
MF	(Italy) Marco Oliva	(Italy) Foggia	Undisclosed	1 September 2025	

== Friendlies ==
30 July 2025	Modena	4–1	Pistoiese	Fanano
17:00				Stadium: Campo Lotta

2 August 2025	Modena	0–0	San Marino

10 August 2025	Modena	2–1	Forlì

== Competitions ==
=== Overall record ===
Competition	First match	Last match	Starting round	Final position	Record							
Competition	First match	Last match	Starting round	Final position	Pld	W	D	L	GF	GA	GD	Win %
Serie B	25 August 2025	9 May 2026	Matchday 1		4	3	1	0	9	2	+7	75.00
Coppa Italia	18 August 2025		First round	First round	1	0	0	1	0	1	−1	0.00
Total					5	3	1	1	9	3	+6	60.00

Last updated: 20 September 2025
Source: Competitions

=== Serie B ===
==== League table ====
Pos	Team	Pld	W	D	L	GF	GA	GD	Pts	Promotion, qualification or relegation
4	Palermo	38	20	12	6	61	33	+28	72	Qualification for promotion play-offs semi-finals
5	Catanzaro	38	15	14	9	62	51	+11	59	Qualification for promotion play-offs preliminary round
6	Modena	38	15	10	13	49	36	+13	55	Qualification for promotion play-offs preliminary round
7	Juve Stabia	38	11	18	9	44	45	−1	51	Qualification for promotion play-offs preliminary round
8	Avellino	38	13	10	15	43	55	−12	49	Qualification for promotion play-offs preliminary round

Source: Serie BKT
Rules for classification: 1) Points; 2) Head-to-head points; 3) Head-to-head goal difference; 4) Goal difference; 5) Goals scored; 6) Draw.
(Note: Head-to-head record is used only after all the matches between the teams in question have been played)

==== Results summary ====
Overall								Home						Away					
Pld	W	D	L	GF	GA	GD	Pts	W	D	L	GF	GA	GD	W	D	L	GF	GA	GD
38	15	10	13	49	36	+13	55	9	4	6	28	17	+11	6	6	7	21	19	+2

Last updated: 8 May 2026.
Source: worldfootball

==== Results by round ====
Round	1	2	3	4	5	6	7	8	9	10	11	12	13	14	15	16	17	18	19	20	21	22	23	24	25
Ground	A	H	H	A	H	A	H	A	H	A	H	A	H	A	H	A	H	H	A	A	H	A	H	A	H
Result	W	D	W	W	W	D	W	D	W	L	W	D	D	L	L	W	L	L	L	W	D	D	L	W	W
Position	3	3	1	1	1	2	1	1	1	1	1	2	2	3	6	6	6	7	7	6	6	5	8	7	6

Updated to match(es) played on 14 February 2026. Source:
A = Away; H = Home; W = Win; D = Draw; L = Loss

==== Matches ====
25 August 2025 1	Sampdoria	0–2	Modena	Genoa
19:30 UTC+2	Pafundi (yellow card) 79'		Zampano (yellow card) 37'; Di Mariano (yellow card) 61'; Santoro 74'; Zanimacchia (yellow card) 83', (goal) 90'; Beyuku (yellow card) 86'	Stadium: Stadio Luigi Ferraris; Attendance: 24,811; Referee: Marco Piccinini

31 August 2025 2	Modena	1–1	Avellino	Modena
20:00 UTC+2	Defrel (yellow card) 42', (goal) 63'; Magnino (yellow card) 90+3'		Cagnano (yellow card) 41' (red card) 74'; Sounas 54', (yellow card) 90'; Patierno (yellow card) 70'; Manzi (yellow card) 90+6'	Stadium: Stadio Alberto Braglia; Attendance: 11,112; Referee: Luca Massimi

13 September 2025 3	Modena	3–0	Bari	Modena
14:00 UTC+2	Gliozzi 32' (pen.), 54' (pen.); Sersanti (yellow card) 74'; Mendes 89'		Dorval (yellow card) 30'; Braunöder (yellow card) 59'	Stadium: Stadio Alberto Braglia; Attendance: 10,743; Referee: Andrea Calzavara

20 September 2025 4	Mantova	1–3	Modena	Mantua
18:30 UTC+2	Majer (yellow card) 9'; Radaelli (yellow card) 24'; Mancuso 45+2' (pen.); Castellini (yellow card) 58'		Gliozzi 1', (penalty missed) 13'; Di Mariano (yellow card) 14'; Nieling (yellow card) 29'; Tonoli 38'; Gerli (yellow card) 44'; Majer 67' (o.g.)	Stadium: Stadio Danilo Martelli; Attendance: 8,019; Referee: Luca Pairetto

28 September 2025 5	Modena	2–1	Pescara	Modena
16:15 UTC+2	Tonoli (yellow card) 7'; Cauz (yellow card) 9'; Di Mariano (yellow card) 12'; Gliozzi 52' (pen.); Sersanti 58'		Pellacani (yellow card) 3'; Olzer 40'; Brosco (yellow card) 56'; Valzania (yellow card) 64'	Stadium: Stadio Alberto Braglia; Attendance: 11,259; Referee: Claudio Giuseppe Allegretta

1 October 2025 6	Carrarese	0–0	Modena	Carrara
19:30 UTC+2	Schiavi (yellow card) 45+2'; Illanes (yellow card) 55'		Dellavalle (yellow card) 29'; Pyyhtiä (yellow card) 43'; Tonoli (yellow card) 48'; Magnino (yellow card) 54'	Stadium: Stadio dei Marmi; Attendance: 3,044; Referee: Simone Galipò

5 October 2025 7	Modena	2–0	Virtus Entella	Modena
18:30 UTC+2	Santoro (yellow card) 55'; Gliozzi 66' (pen.); Mendes 90'			Stadium: Stadio Alberto Braglia; Attendance: 9,666; Referee: Niccolò Turrini

19 October 2025 8	Palermo	1–1	Modena	Palermo
14:00 UTC+2	Segre (yellow card) 18', (goal) 32'		Gerli (yellow card) 17'; Bereszyński 76' (o.g.)	Stadium: Stadio Renzo Barbera; Attendance: 32,922; Referee: Daniele Chiffi

24 October 2025 9	Modena	2–1	Empoli	Modena
19:30 UTC+2	Gliozzi 45+6' (pen.); Zampano (yellow card) 50'; Tonoli 66', (yellow card) 90+4'; Sersanti (yellow card) 79'		Ceesay 22'; Elia (yellow card) 30'; Ilie (yellow card) 30'; Shpendi (yellow card) 37'	Stadium: Stadio Alberto Braglia; Attendance: 11,879; Referee: Paride Tremolada

28 October 2025 10	Reggiana	1–0	Modena	Reggio Emilia
20:30 UTC+2	Bozzolan 17'; Charlys (yellow card) 64'; Bonetti (yellow card) 90+3'		Nieling (yellow card) 61'; Di Mariano (yellow card) 70'; Tonoli (yellow card) 90+4'	Stadium: Mapei Stadium – Città del Tricolore; Attendance: 14,719; Referee: Antonio Rapuano

2 November 2025 11	Modena	3–0	Juve Stabia	Modena
15:00 UTC+2	Nieling 14'; Gliozzi 69' (pen.); Santoro (yellow card) 81'; Ruggero 90' (o.g.)		Bellich (yellow card) 56'; Piscopo (yellow card) 84'; Gabrielloni (yellow card) 90+1'	Stadium: Stadio Alberto Braglia; Attendance: 9,271; Referee: Federico Dionisi

8 November 2025 12	Frosinone	2–2	Modena	Frosinone
15:00 UTC+2	Koutsoupias 9'; Calò 50', (yellow card) 63'; Bracaglia (yellow card) 90+2'; Zilli (yellow card) 90+8'		Zampano 56'; Chichizola (yellow card) 89'; Massolin 89'	Stadium: Stadio Benito Stirpe; Attendance: 11,412; Referee: Alberto Arena

23 November 2025 13	Modena	0–0	Südtirol	Modena
15:00 UTC+2				Stadium: Stadio Alberto Braglia; Attendance: 10,890; Referee: Andrea Zanotti

28 November 2025 14	Cesena	1–0	Modena	Cesena
20:30 UTC+2	Mangraviti (yellow card) 32'; Blesa 43'		Nieling (yellow card) 89'	Stadium: Stadio Dino Manuzzi; Attendance: 13,442; Referee: Andrea Calzavara

8 December 2025 15	Modena	1–2	Catanzaro	Modena
12:30 UTC+2	Mendes 31'		Bettella (yellow card) 30'; Cassandro (yellow card) 52'; Antonini 66'; Pittarello 90+1' (pen.)	Stadium: Stadio Alberto Braglia; Attendance: 11,303; Referee: Niccolò Turrini

13 December 2025 16	Spezia	0–2	Modena	La Spezia
15:00 UTC+2	Fellipe Jack (yellow card) 25' (red card) 68'; Bandinelli (yellow card) 72'; Esposito (yellow card) 90+8'		Nieling 5'; Pyyhtiä (yellow card) 37'; Massolin (yellow card) 60'; Gliozzi 90'; Tonoli (yellow card) 90+2'; Zampano (yellow card) 90+5'; Magnino (yellow card) 90+8'	Stadium: Stadio Alberto Picco; Attendance: 8,394; Referee: Mario Perri

20 December 2025 17	Modena	1–2	Venezia	Modena
15:00 UTC+2	Santoro (yellow card) 66'; Di Mariano 90+4'		Yeboah 38'; Schingtienne (yellow card) 50'; Busio (yellow card) 63'; Hainaut (yellow card) 68'; Casas 74'	Stadium: Stadio Alberto Braglia; Attendance: 11,120; Referee: Giuseppe Mucera

26 December 2025 18	Modena	1–2	Monza	Modena
17:15 UTC+2	Adorni (yellow card) 16'; Gliozzi 40' (pen.); Zampano (yellow card) 44'; Tonoli (yellow card) 90+1'; Beyuku (yellow card) 90+5'		Baldé (yellow card) 18'; Izzo (yellow card) 39'; Pessina (yellow card) 44'; Azzi 50'; Ravanelli 65'; Ciurria (yellow card) 87'	Stadium: Stadio Alberto Braglia; Attendance: 11,316; Referee: Kevin Bonacina

11 January 2026 19	Padova	2–0	Modena	Padua
17:15 UTC+2	Bortolussi 11'; Perrotta (yellow card) 26'; Belli (yellow card) 57'; Ghiglione (yellow card) 85'; Lasagna 90+1'	Report	Adorni (yellow card) 34'	Stadium: Stadio Euganeo; Attendance: 6,847; Referee: Maria Sole Ferrieri Caputi

18 January 2026 20	Pescara	0–2	Modena	Pescara
15:00 UTC+2		Report	Zampano 27'; De Luca 44'; Cotali (yellow card) 85'; Gerli (yellow card) 90+1'	Stadium: Stadio Adriatico – Giovanni Cornacchia; Attendance: 7,556; Referee: Gianluca Manganiello

24 January 2026 21	Modena	0–0	Palermo	Modena
17:15 UTC+2	Nador (yellow card) 84'	Report	Gyasi (yellow card) 76'	Stadium: Stadio Alberto Braglia; Attendance: 13,803; Referee: Federico Dionisi

31 January 2026 22	Empoli	0–0	Modena	Empoli
15:00 UTC+2	Shpendi (yellow card) 56'	Report	De Luca (yellow card) 38'; Nador (yellow card) 45' (red card) 81'	Stadium: Stadio Carlo Castellani; Attendance: 6,386; Referee: Giuseppe Mucera

7 February 2026 23	Modena	1–2	Sampdoria	Modena
15:00 UTC+2	Zampano (yellow card) 58'; Gliozzi 75'	Report	Brunori 54'; Conti (yellow card) 64'; Martinelli (yellow card) 70'; Riccio (yellow card) 86'; Begić 90', (yellow card) 90+1'; Soleri (yellow card) 90+4'	Stadium: Stadio Alberto Braglia; Attendance: 11,855; Referee: Ivano Pezzuto

10 February 2026 24	Venezia	0–2	Modena	Venice
20:00 UTC+2	Casas (red card) 45+2'; Pietrelli (yellow card) 85'; Svoboda (yellow card) 90+6'	Report	Tonoli 27'; Beyuku 30', (yellow card) 30'; Imputato (yellow card) 72'; Cotali (yellow card) 90+2'	Stadium: Stadio Pier Luigi Penzo; Attendance: 8,109; Referee: Kevin Bonacina

14 February 2026 25	Modena	2–0	Carrarese	Modena
15:00 UTC+2	Beyuku (yellow card) 9'; Massolin 33'; Nieling (yellow card) 61'; Zanimacchia (yellow card) 62'; Dellavalle (yellow card) 73'; Sottil (yellow card) 84'; Defrel 90+1', (yellow card) 90+3'	Report	Schiavi (yellow card) 53'; Ruggeri (yellow card) 61'; Illanes (yellow card) 88'; Zuelli (yellow card) 90+1'	Stadium: Stadio Alberto Braglia; Attendance: 8,087; Referee: Mario Perri

22 February 2026 26	Juve Stabia	1–2	Modena	Castellammare di Stabia
15:00 UTC+2	Bellich (yellow card) 47'; Gabrielloni (yellow card) 55'; Cacciamani (yellow card) 57'; Mosti 74'; Diakité (yellow card) 90+7'		Zanimacchia 3', (yellow card) 87'; Tonoli (yellow card) 20' (red card) 79'; Zampano 23'; Ambrosino (yellow card) 41'	Stadium: Stadio Romeo Menti; Attendance: 4,408; Referee: Giovanni Ayroldi

28 February 2026 27	Modena	1–2	Padova	Modena
15:00 UTC+2	Massolin (yellow card) 51'; Zanimacchia 56'; Nador (yellow card) 89'		Lasagna 8'; Faedo 14'; Buonaiuto (yellow card) 44'; Fortin (yellow card) 74'; Varas (yellow card) 90+1'	Stadium: Stadio Alberto Braglia; Attendance: 9,879; Referee: Andrea Calzavara

3 March 2026 28	Virtus Entella	2–1	Modena	Chiavari
20:00 UTC+2	Marconi (yellow card) 25'; Del Lungo 45'; Karić 85', (yellow card) 77' (red card) 85'		Tonoli 45+2'; Nieling (yellow card) 56'	Stadium: Stadio Enrico Sannazzari; Attendance: 1,909; Referee: Paride Tremolada

7 March 2026 29	Modena	0–0	Cesena	Modena
19:30 UTC+2	Zampano (yellow card) 89'			Stadium: Stadio Alberto Braglia; Attendance: 10,653; Referee: Matteo Marcenaro

13 March 2026 30	Modena	3–0	Spezia	Modena
20:30 UTC+2	De Luca 29', 55'; Gliozzi 59'		Bellemo (yellow card) 51'; Beruatto (yellow card) 53'	Stadium: Stadio Alberto Braglia; Attendance: 9,412; Referee: Niccolò Turrini

21 March 2026 31	Modena	2–1	Mantova	Modena
19:30 UTC+2	Sersanti 14'; Zampano (yellow card) 31'; Tonoli 59'		Radaelli (yellow card) 62'; Kouda (yellow card) 79'; Mensah 81', (yellow card) 90+5'; Castellini (yellow card) 87'	Stadium: Stadio Alberto Braglia; Attendance: 9,815; Referee: Maria Sole Ferrieri Caputi

6 April 2026 32	Bari	3–1	Modena	Bari
14:00 UTC+2	Moncini 22' (pen.); Adorni 31' (o.g.); Maggiore (yellow card) 59'; Çuni 80'; Mantovani (yellow card) 90+7'		Gerli (yellow card) 88'; Ambrosino 90'; Massolin (yellow card) 90+7'	Stadium: Stadio San Nicola; Attendance: 8,764; Referee: Alberto Arena

11 April 2026 33	Südtirol	1–1	Modena	Bolzano
14:00 UTC+2	Pietrangeli 60', (yellow card) 81'		Santoro 21'; Beyuku (yellow card) 63'	Stadium: Stadio Druso; Attendance: 4,163; Referee: Andrea Zanotti

14 April 2026 34	Catanzaro	2–2	Modena	Catanzaro
18:00 UTC+2	Pittarello 5'; Cassandro (yellow card) 27'; Pontisso (yellow card) 34'; Rispoli 40'		Adorni 28'; Gerli (yellow card) 46'; Mendes 90+5'; Cotali (yellow card) 90+6'	Stadium: Stadio Nicola Ceravolo; Attendance: 8,334; Referee: Claudio Giuseppe Allegretta

18 April 2026 35	Modena	1–2	Frosinone	Modena
14:00 UTC+2	De Luca (yellow card) 28'; Massolin 41'; Colpo (yellow card) 88'; Santoro (yellow card) 90+2'		Cittadini (yellow card) 35'; Ghedjemis 52', 60', (yellow card) 74'; Kvernadze (yellow card) 77'; Calvani (yellow card) 82'	Stadium: Stadio Alberto Braglia; Attendance: 9,582; Referee: Giovanni Ayroldi

24 April 2026 36	Monza	1–0	Modena	Monza
18:00 UTC+2	Birindelli 27'; Bakoune (yellow card) 90'		Tonoli (yellow card) 45+2'; Nieling (yellow card) 85'	Stadium: Stadio Brianteo; Attendance: 8,039; Referee: Federico Dionisi

1 May 2026 37	Modena	2–1	Reggiana	Modena
14:00 UTC+2	Zampano 13', (yellow card) 14'; Ambrosino 56', (yellow card) 57' (red card) 69'; Santoro (yellow card) 76'		Bonetti (yellow card) 35'; Belardinelli (yellow card) 56'; Vicari 65'; Portanova (yellow card) 85'	Stadium: Stadio Alberto Braglia; Attendance: 12,357; Referee: Rosario Abisso

8 May 2026 38	Avellino	1–0	Modena	Avellino
19:30 UTC+2	Bagheria 44' (o.g.); Izzo (yellow card) 49'		Pyyhtiä (yellow card) 13'	Stadium: Stadio Partenio-Adriano Lombardi; Attendance: 9,700; Referee: Davide Di Marco

=== Coppa Italia ===
18 August 2025 First round	Torino	1–0	Modena	Turin
21:15	Vlašić 51'			Stadium: Stadio Olimpico Grande Torino; Attendance: 12,533; Referee: Paride Tremolada
