= 2023–24 Modena FC 2018 season =

Modena FC 2018
2023–24 season
- Manager: Paolo Bianco
- Stadium: Stadio Alberto Braglia
- Serie B: 10th
- Coppa Italia: Round of 64
- Top goalscorer: League: Antonio Palumbo (7); All: Antonio Palumbo (7)
- Average home league attendance: 10,066

The 2023–24 season was Modena FC 2018's 112th season in existence and the club's second consecutive season in the second division of Italian football. In addition to the domestic league, Modena participated in this season's edition of the Coppa Italia. The season covers the period from 1 July 2023 to 30 June 2024.

== Players ==
=== First-team squad ===
As of 1 September 2023

Note: Flags indicate national team as defined under FIFA eligibility rules; some limited exceptions apply. Players may hold more than one non-FIFA nationality.

No.	Pos.	Nation	Player
3	DF	ITA	Fabio Ponsi
4	DF	ITA	Antonio Pergreffi (captain)
5	MF	ITA	Antonio Palumbo
6	MF	ITA	Luca Magnino
7	MF	ITA	Edoardo Duca
8	DF	BFA	Abdoul Guiebre
9	FW	ITA	Nicholas Bonfanti
10	MF	ITA	Luca Tremolada
11	FW	ITA	Diego Falcinelli
12	GK	ITA	Andrea Seculin
16	MF	ITA	Fabio Gerli
17	FW	ITA	Jacopo Manconi
19	DF	ITA	Giovanni Zaro
20	MF	ITA	Mario Gargiulo

No.	Pos.	Nation	Player
21	MF	ITA	Romeo Giovannini
22	GK	ITA	Filippo Vandelli
23	MF	ITA	Thomas Battistella
24	DF	CRO	Roko Vukušić
26	GK	ITA	Riccardo Gagno
27	DF	ITA	Alessandro Pio Riccio (on loan from Juventus)
29	DF	ITA	Matteo Cotali
30	FW	ALB	Kleis Bozhanaj
32	FW	ITA	Luca Strizzolo
33	DF	ITA	Cristian Cauz
42	MF	BEL	Lukas Mondele
90	FW	ITA	Fabio Abiuso
99	DF	MAR	Shady Oukhadda

=== Other players under contract ===
Note: Flags indicate national team as defined under FIFA eligibility rules; some limited exceptions apply. Players may hold more than one non-FIFA nationality.

No.	Pos.	Nation	Player
—	DF	ITA	Riccardo Baroni

=== Out on loan ===
Note: Flags indicate national team as defined under FIFA eligibility rules; some limited exceptions apply. Players may hold more than one non-FIFA nationality.

No.	Pos.	Nation	Player
—	DF	ITA	Lorenzo Coccia (at Arezzo until 30 June 2024)
—	DF	ITA	Mauro Coppolaro (at Carrarese until 30 June 2025)

No.	Pos.	Nation	Player
—	MF	ITA	Nicola Mosti (at Virtus Entella until 30 June 2024)

== Transfers ==
=== In ===
Pos.	Player	Transferred from	Fee	Date	Source
DF	(Italy) Matteo Cotali	(Italy) Frosinone	Free	1 July 2023	
FW	(Italy) Jacopo Manconi	(Italy) AlbinoLeffe	Free	1 July 2023	
DF	(Italy) Cristian Cauz	(Italy) Reggiana	Free	1 July 2023	
MF	(Belgium) Lukas Mondele	(Italy) Club NXT	Free	1 July 2023	
MF	(Italy) Filippo Vandelli	(Italy) Fidelis Andria	Free	6 July 2023	
DF	(Italy) Giovanni Zaro	(Italy) Südtirol		10 July 2023	
MF	(Italy) Antonio Palumbo	(Italy) Ternana	€500k	18 July 2023	

=== Out ===
Pos.	Player	Transferred to	Fee	Date	Source

== Pre-season and friendlies ==
Win Draw Loss Fixtures

3 August 2023 Friendly	Modena (Italy)	2–0	(Albania) Dinamo Tirana
17:00 CEST (UTC+2)

19 August 2023 Friendly	Virtus Verona (Italy)	1–1	(Italy) Modena
17:00 CEST (UTC+2)

14 October 2023 Friendly	Empoli (Italy)	Cancelled	(Italy) Modena	Vinci
14:30 CEST (UTC+2)				Stadium: Centro Sportivo di Petroio
Note: The match was cancelled due to unavailability of players.

== Competitions ==
=== Overview ===
Competition	First match	Last match	Starting round	Final position	Record							
Competition	First match	Last match	Starting round	Final position	Pld	W	D	L	GF	GA	GD	Win %
Serie B	26 August 2023	10 May 2024	Matchday 1		35	9	16	10	38	44	−6	25.71
Coppa Italia	11 August 2023		Round of 64	Round of 64	1	0	0	1	3	4	−1	0.00
Total					36	9	16	11	41	48	−7	25.00

Last updated: 27 April 2024
Source: Competitions

=== Serie B ===
==== League table ====
Pos	Team	Pld	W	D	L	GF	GA	GD	Pts	Promotion, qualification or relegation
8	Brescia	38	12	15	11	44	40	+4	51	Qualification for promotion play-offs preliminary round
9	Cosenza	38	11	14	13	47	42	+5	47 (Note: Head-to-head points: Cosenza 11, Modena 11, Reggiana 7, Südtirol 3. Head-to-head goal difference: Cosenza +6, Modena +2.)	
10	Modena	38	10	17	11	41	47	−6	47	
11	Reggiana	38	10	17	11	38	45	−7	47	
12	Südtirol	38	12	11	15	46	48	−2	47	

Source: Soccerway (in English)
Rules for classification: 1) Points; 2) Head-to-head points; 3) Head-to-head goal difference; 4) Goal difference; 5) Goals scored; 6) Draw.
(Note: Head-to-head record is used only after all the matches between the teams in question have been played)

==== Results summary ====
Overall								Home						Away					
Pld	W	D	L	GF	GA	GD	Pts	W	D	L	GF	GA	GD	W	D	L	GF	GA	GD
35	9	16	10	38	44	−6	43	6	5	7	19	21	−2	3	11	3	19	23	−4

Last updated: 27 April 2024.

==== Results by round ====
Round	1	2	3	4	5	6	7	8	9	10	11	12	13
Ground	A	H	A	H	A	H	A	H	H	A	H	A	H
Result	W	W	W	W	D	D	D	L	L	D	W	W	
Position													

Updated to match(es) played on 4 November 2023. Source:
A = Away; H = Home; W = Win; D = Draw; L = Loss

==== Matches ====
The league fixtures were unveiled on 11 July 2023.

26 August 2023 2	Modena	1–0	Ascoli	Modena
CEST (UTC+2)				Stadium: Stadio Alberto Braglia

29 August 2023 3	Cosenza	1–2	Modena	Cosenza
CEST (UTC+2)

2 September 2023 4	Modena	2–0	Pisa	Modena
CEST (UTC+2)				Stadium: Stadio Alberto Braglia

16 September 2023 5	Feralpisalò	1–1	Modena	Piacenza
14:00 CEST (UTC+2)				Stadium: Stadio Leonardo Garilli

23 September 2023 6	Modena	0–0	Lecco	Modena
14:00 CEST (UTC+2)				Stadium: Stadio Alberto Braglia

26 September 2023 7	Südtirol	0–0	Modena	Bolzano
CEST (UTC+2)

30 September 2023 8	Modena	1–3	Venezia	Modena
CEST (UTC+2)				Stadium: Stadio Alberto Braglia

7 October 2023 9	Modena	0–2	Palermo	Modena
CEST (UTC+2)				Stadium: Stadio Alberto Braglia

21 October 2023 10	Bari	1–1	Modena	Bari
CEST (UTC+2)

24 October 2023 1	Brescia	0–1	Modena	Brescia
CEST (UTC+2)				Stadium: Stadio Mario Rigamonti

29 October 2023 11	Modena	2–1	Ternana	Modena
CET (UTC+1)	Palumbo 17'; Falcinelli 56'		Dionisi 90+4'	Stadium: Stadio Alberto Braglia

4 November 2023 12	Catanzaro	1–2	Modena	Catanzaro
14:00 CET (UTC+1)	Vandeputte 19'		Manconi 27'; Bozhanaj 90+5'	Stadium: Stadio Nicola Ceravolo

11 November 2023 13	Modena	0–2	Sampdoria	Modena
16:15 CET (UTC+1)				Stadium: Stadio Alberto Braglia

12 April 2024 33	Modena	1–3	Catanzaro	Modena
20:30 CEST (UTC+2)		Report		Stadium: Stadio Alberto Braglia; Referee: Daniele Perenzoni

27 April 2024 35	Modena	1–0	Südtirol	Modena
14:00 CEST (UTC+2)	Zaro 67'			Stadium: Stadio Alberto Braglia; Referee: Daniele Minelli

5 May 2024 37	Modena	v	Como	Modena
15:00 CEST (UTC+2)				Stadium: Stadio Alberto Braglia

10 May 2024 38	Lecco	v	Modena	Lecco
20:30 CEST (UTC+2)				Stadium: Stadio Rigamonti-Ceppi

=== Coppa Italia ===
11 August 2023 Round of 64	Genoa	4–3	Modena	Genoa
21:00 CEST (UTC+2)	Retegui 1', 57'; Vásquez 45+3'; Frendrup (yellow card) 48'; Guðmundsson 51'; Hefti (yellow card) 90+1'	Report	Manconi 29', (yellow card) 88'; Duca (yellow card) 32'; Tremolada 40'; Gerli (yellow card) 69'; Gargiulo (yellow card) 59', (goal) 77'	Stadium: Stadio Luigi Ferraris; Attendance: 25,000; Referee: Gianluca Aureliano
