= 2022–23 Modena FC 2018 season =

Modena F.C. 2018
2022–23 season
- Chairman: Carlo Rivetti
- Manager: Attilio Tesser
- Stadium: Stadio Alberto Braglia
- Serie B: 10th
- Coppa Italia: Round of 32
- Top goalscorer: League: Davide Diaw (10; All: Davide Diaw (13)
- Biggest win: Modena 5–1 Como
- Biggest defeat: Venezia 5–0 Modena

The 2022–23 season was the 111th in the history of Modena F.C. 2018 and their first season back in the second division since 2016. The club participated in Serie B and Coppa Italia.

== Players ==
As of 29 September 2022

Note: Flags indicate national team as defined under FIFA eligibility rules; some limited exceptions apply. Players may hold more than one non-FIFA nationality.

No.	Pos.	Nation	Player
1	GK	ITA	Antonio Narciso
3	DF	ITA	Fabio Ponsi
4	DF	ITA	Antonio Pergreffi (captain)
5	DF	ITA	Giorgio Cittadini (on loan from Atalanta)
6	MF	ITA	Luca Magnino
7	MF	ITA	Edoardo Duca
8	MF	ITA	Nicola Mosti
9	FW	ITA	Nicholas Bonfanti
10	MF	ITA	Luca Tremolada
11	FW	ITA	Diego Falcinelli
12	GK	ITA	Andrea Seculin
15	DF	ITA	Tommaso Silvestri
16	MF	ITA	Fabio Gerli
17	FW	ITA	Davide Marsura

No.	Pos.	Nation	Player
19	MF	ITA	Romeo Giovannini
20	MF	ITA	Mario Gargiulo
21	MF	ITA	Marco Armellino
23	MF	ITA	Thomas Battistella
24	MF	ITA	Andrea Poli
26	GK	ITA	Riccardo Gagno
27	DF	BRA	Paulo Azzi
28	DF	FRA	Sebastien De Maio (on loan from Vicenza)
33	DF	ITA	Francesco Renzetti
43	MF	ITA	Simone Panada (on loan from Atalanta)
57	DF	ITA	Mauro Coppolaro
77	DF	ITA	Matteo Piacentini
96	DF	MAR	Shady Oukhadda
99	FW	ITA	Davide Diaw (on loan from Monza)

=== Out on loan ===
Note: Flags indicate national team as defined under FIFA eligibility rules; some limited exceptions apply. Players may hold more than one non-FIFA nationality.

No.	Pos.	Nation	Player
—	DF	ITA	Riccardo Baroni (at Pontedera until 30 June 2023)
—	DF	ITA	Lorenzo Coccia (at Carrarese until 30 June 2023)
—	DF	ITA	Tommaso Maggioni (at Juve Stabia until 30 June 2023)
—	MF	BFA	Abdoul Guiebre (at Reggiana until 30 June 2023)
—	MF	ITA	Jacopo Nelli (at Piacenza until 30 June 2023)

No.	Pos.	Nation	Player
—	MF	ITA	Edoardo Saporiti (at Montevarchi until 30 June 2023)
—	FW	ITA	Fabio Abiuso (at Pergolettese until 30 June 2023)
—	FW	ITA	Roberto Ogunseye (at Foggia until 30 June 2023)
—	FW	ITA	Tiziano Tulissi (at Fermana until 30 June 2023)

== Pre-season and friendlies ==
Win Draw Loss

10 July 2022 Friendly	Modena (Italy)	23–0	(Italy) Cimone Calcio	Fanano
17:00 CEST (UTC+2)				Stadium: Stadio Lotta; Referee: Belloi

13 July 2022 Friendly	Modena (Italy)	15–0	(Italy) Rappresentativa Montagna	Fanano
17:00 CEST (UTC+2)				Stadium: Stadio Lotta; Referee: Belloi

16 July 2022 Friendly	Modena (Italy)	3–0	(Italy) Formigine	Fanano
17:00 CEST (UTC+2)	Scarsella 36'; Abiuso 64'; Marotta 74'			Stadium: Stadio Lotta

21 July 2022 Friendly	Modena (Italy)	9–0	(Italy) Castelvetro	Fanano
17:00 CEST (UTC+2)		Report		Stadium: Stadio Lotta; Referee: Sivilla

22 July 2022 Friendly	Modena (Italy)	1–0	(Italy) Fiorenzuola	Fanano
17:00 CEST (UTC+2)	Tremolada 2'	Report		Stadium: Stadio Lotta; Referee: Cortese

== Competitions ==
=== Overall record ===
Competition	First match	Last match	Starting round	Final position	Record							
Competition	First match	Last match	Starting round	Final position	Pld	W	D	L	GF	GA	GD	Win %
Serie B	14 August 2022	19 May 2023	Matchday 1	10th	38	13	9	16	47	53	−6	34.21
Coppa Italia	31 July 2022	20 October 2022	Preliminary round	Round of 32	3	2	0	1	8	7	+1	66.67
Total					41	15	9	17	55	60	−5	36.59

Source: Soccerway

=== Serie B ===
==== League table ====
Pos	Team	Pld	W	D	L	GF	GA	GD	Pts	Promotion, qualification or relegation
8	Venezia	38	13	10	15	51	50	+1	49	Qualification for promotion play-offs preliminary round
9	Palermo	38	11	16	11	48	49	−1	49	
10	Modena	38	13	9	16	47	53	−6	48	
11	Pisa	38	11	14	13	48	42	+6	47 (Note: Head-to-head points: Pisa 5, Ascoli 5, Como 4. Head-to-head goal difference: Pisa +1, Ascoli −1.)	
12	Ascoli	38	12	11	15	40	47	−7	47	

Source: Soccerway (in English)
Rules for classification: 1) Points; 2) Head-to-head points; 3) Head-to-head goal difference; 4) Goal difference; 5) Goals scored; 6) Draw.

==== Results summary ====
Overall								Home						Away					
Pld	W	D	L	GF	GA	GD	Pts	W	D	L	GF	GA	GD	W	D	L	GF	GA	GD
38	13	9	16	47	53	−6	48	7	8	4	26	18	+8	6	1	12	21	35	−14

Source: Serie B

==== Results by round ====
Round	1	2	3	4	5	6	7	8	9	10	11	12	13	14	15	16	17	18	19	20	21	22	23	24	25	26	27	28	29	30	31	32	33	34	35	36	37	38
Ground	H	A	H	A	H	A	H	A	H	A	H	A	H	A	A	H	A	H	A	A	H	A	H	A	H	A	H	A	H	A	H	A	H	H	A	H	A	H
Result	L	L	W	L	L	L	W	W	W	L	L	D	D	W	W	D	L	D	W	L	W	L	W	W	D	L	L	L	W	L	D	W	D	D	L	D	L	W
Position	17	19	15	16	18	18	17	11	10	12	13	15	15	12	10	10	13	13	10	11	10	11	11	9	8	10	11	12	10	12	11	10	11	10	12	12	13	10

Source: Serie B
A = Away; H = Home; W = Win; D = Draw; L = Loss

==== Matches ====
The league fixtures were announced on 15 July 2022.

=== Coppa Italia ===
31 July 2022 Preliminary round	Modena	3–1	Catanzaro	Modena
20:30 CEST (UTC+2)	Silvestri 1'; Diaw 45+2'; Magnino 74'	Report	Tarantini 59'	Stadium: Stadio Alberto Braglia; Referee: Daniele Perenzoni

8 August 2022 Round of 64	Modena	3–2	Sassuolo	Modena
18:00 CEST (UTC+2)	Falcinelli 11'; Mosti 30', 52'	Report	Berardi 45+2'; Ayhan 88'	Stadium: Stadio Alberto Braglia; Referee: Gianluca Aureliano

20 October 2022 Round of 32	Cremonese	4–2 (a.e.t.)	Modena	Cremona
15:00 CEST (UTC+2)	Vásquez (yellow card) 50'; Okereke 77'; Afena-Gyan 84'; Buonaiuto (yellow card) 89'; Escalante (yellow card) 98'; Sernicola 111', 120'	Report	Magnino (yellow card) 9' (yellow-red card) 22'; De Maio (yellow card) 36'; Diaw 89' (pen.), 90'; Armellino (yellow card) 99'	Stadium: Stadio Giovanni Zini; Attendance: 2,772; Referee: Daniele Paterna
