= 2025–26 Ascoli Calcio 1898 FC season =

Italian football club season 2025-26

Ascoli Calcio 1898 FC
2025–26 season
- Manager: Francesco Tomei
- Stadium: Stadio Cino e Lillo Del Duca
- Serie C: 3rd
- Coppa Italia Serie C: Second round
- Top goalscorer: League: All: Simone D'Uffizi (2)
- Highest home attendance: 10,009 vs Juventus Next Gen
- Lowest home attendance: 9,718 vs Pianese

The 2025–26 season is the 128th in the history of Ascoli Calcio 1898 FC and the club's second consecutive season in Italian football's Serie C. In addition to the domestic league, Ascoli competes in the Coppa Italia Serie C. The season began on 17 August 2025.

== Squad ==
=== Transfers In ===
Pos.	Player	Transferred from	Fee	Date	Source
DF	(Slovenia) Aljaž Tavčar	(Italy) Clodiense	Loan return	30 June 2025	
MF	(Albania) Emanuele Ndoj	(Italy) Latina	Free	15 July 2025	
DF	(Burkina Faso) Abdoul Guiebre	(Italy) Modena	Undisclosed	15 July 2025	
DF	(Italy) Nicholas Rizzo	(Italy) Triestina	Free	28 July 2025	
MF	(Italy) Samuele Damiani	(Italy) Ternana	€180,000	13 August 2025	
FW	(Italy) Mohammed Chakir	(Italy) Pineto	Undisclosed	21 August 2025	
MF	(Italy) Giovanni Corradini	(Italy) Spezia	€400,000	28 August 2025	
DF	(Italy) Gabriele Pagliai	(Italy) Picerno	€500,000	29 August 2025	
MF	(Italy) Andrea Rizzo Pinna	(Italy) Cosenza	Loan	31 August 2025	
FW	(Italy) Gabriele Gori	(Italy) Avellino	Loan	31 August 2025	
GK	(Slovenia) Rok Bržan	Unattached		11 September 2025	

=== Transfers Out ===
Pos.	Player	Transferred to	Fee	Date	Source
DF	(Italy) Francesco D'Amore	(Italy) Juve Stabia	Loan return	30 June 2025	
GK	(Italy) Alessandro Livieri	(Italy) Pisa	Loan return	30 June 2025	
MF	(Italy) Ivan Varone	(Italy) Salernitana	Undisclosed	11 July 2025	
FW	(Italy) Francesco Forte	(Italy) Catania	Loan	17 July 2025	
DF	(Slovenia) Aljaž Tavčar	(Italy) L'Aquila	Loan	18 July 2025	
DF	(Italy) Valerio Mantovani	(Italy) Mantova	€300,000	25 July 2025	
DF	(Italy) Mattia Piermarini	(Italy) Milan Futuro	Undisclosed	13 August 2025	
MF	(Italy) Yehiya Maiga Silvestri	(Italy) Teramo	Free	20 August 2025	
DF	(Italy) Lorenzo Cosimi	(Italy) Monti Prenestini	Contract terminated	28 August 2025	
GK	(Italy) Matteo Raffaelli	(Italy) Novara	Loan	31 August 2025	
MF	(Ghana) Moses Odjer	(Italy) Livorno	Free	1 September 2025	
FW	(Italy) Mattia Gagliardi		Contract terminated	3 September 2025	

== Friendlies ==
6 August 2025	Ascoli	5–0	SS Maceratese 1922

== Competitions ==
=== Overall record ===
Competition	First match	Last match	Starting round	Record							
Competition	First match	Last match	Starting round	Pld	W	D	L	GF	GA	GD	Win %
Serie C	23 August 2025	26 April 2026	Matchday 1	5	3	2	0	7	0	+7	60.00
Coppa Italia Serie C	17 August 2025		First round	1	0	1	0	2	2	+0	0.00
Total				6	3	3	0	9	2	+7	50.00

Last updated: 20 September 2025
Source: Competitions

=== Serie C ===
Group B

==== Results summary ====
Overall								Home						Away					
Pld	W	D	L	GF	GA	GD	Pts	W	D	L	GF	GA	GD	W	D	L	GF	GA	GD
36	23	8	5	63	23	+40	77	12	5	1	33	9	+24	11	3	4	30	14	+16

Last updated: 26 April 2026.
Source: worldfootball

==== Results by round ====
Round	1	2	3	4	5	6	7	8	9	10	11	12	13	14	15
Ground	H	A	H	A	A	H	A	H	H	A	H	A	H	A	H
Result	D	W	D	W	W	W	W	W	W	D	W	L	D	W	L
Position	11	3	5	3	3	3	3	2	2	1	1	3	3	3	3

Updated to match(es) played on 23 November 2025. Source:
A = Away; H = Home; W = Win; D = Draw; L = Loss

==== Matches ====
23 August 2025 1	Ascoli	0–0	Pianese	Ascoli Piceno
18:00 UTC+2				Stadium: Stadio Cino e Lillo Del Duca; Attendance: 9,718; Referee: Jules Roland Andeng Tona Mbei

31 August 2025 2	Ternana	0–2	Ascoli	Terni
21:00 UTC+2			D'Uffizi 7'; Del Sole 45'	Stadium: Stadio Libero Liberati; Attendance: 3,345; Referee: Maksym Frasynyak

6 September 2025 3	Ascoli	0–0	Juventus Next Gen	Ascoli Piceno
17:30 UTC+2				Stadium: Stadio Cino e Lillo Del Duca; Attendance: 10,009; Referee: Alessandro Recchia

14 September 2025 4	Perugia	0–2	Ascoli	Perugia
15:00 UTC+2			Gori 74' (pen.); Pagliai 86'	Stadium: Stadio Renato Curi; Attendance: 4,709; Referee: Stefano Striamo

20 September 2025 5	Livorno	0–3	Ascoli	Livorno
15:00 UTC+2				Stadium: Stadio Armando Picchi; Referee: Simone Gauzolino

23 September 2025 6	Ascoli	3–0	Pineto	Ascoli Piceno
20:45 UTC+2	Curado (yellow card) 22'; Milanese 33'; D'Uffizi 50'; Chakir 89'	Report	Nicolò Postiglione (yellow card) 40'; Alessandro Pellegrino (yellow card) 62'; Luca Schirone (yellow card) 66'	Stadium: Stadio Cino e Lillo Del Duca; Attendance: 9,612; Referee: (Italy) Mattia Ubaldi

27 September 2025 7	Torres	0–1	Ascoli	Sassari
15:00 CET	Nunziatini (red card) 14'; Nicolò Antonelli (yellow card) 71'; Starita (yellow card) 86'	Report	Ndoj (yellow card) 34' (yellow-red card) 39'; Chakir 49'; Silipo (yellow card) 53'	Stadium: Stadio Vanni Sanna; Attendance: 2,846; Referee: (Italy) Giuseppe Manzo

4 October 2025 8	Ascoli	4–1	Bra	Ascoli Piceno
14:30 CET	Andrea Rizzo Pinna 32'; Gori 45+1' 59' (pen.); D'Uffizi 53'	Report	Matteo Pautassi (yellow card) 15'; Vittorio Chiabotto 90+4'	Stadium: Stadio Cino e Lillo Del Duca; Attendance: 9,366; Referee: (Italy) Leonardo Di Mario

12 October 2025 9	Ascoli	5–0	Pontedera	Ascoli Piceno
17:30 CET	Andrea Rizzo Pinna 31'; D'Uffizi 36' 65'; Milanese 53'; Corazza 84'	Report	Simone Ianesi (yellow card) 35'; Vona (yellow card) 40'; Matteo Manfredonia (yellow card) 66'; Mattia Pretato (yellow card) 81'	Stadium: Stadio Cino e Lillo Del Duca; Attendance: 10,029; Referee: (Italy) Valerio Vogliacco

20 October 2025 10	Carpi	1–1	Ascoli	Carpi
20:30 CET	Sall 80'; Lorenzo Lombardi (yellow card) 90+1'; Casarini (red card) 90+8'	Report	Andrea Rizzo Pinna 88' (yellow card) 90'	Stadium: Stadio Sandro Cabassi; Attendance: 1,702; Referee: (Italy) Enrico Gemelli

26 October 2025 11	Ascoli	1–0	Sambenedettese	Ascoli Piceno
14:30 CET	Andrea Rizzo Pinna (yellow card) 20'; Rizzo (yellow card) 34'; Milanese 40'; Francesco Cozzoli (yellow card) 80'	Report	Candellori (yellow card) 16'; Leonardo Pezzola (yellow card) 45'; Moussa Touré (yellow card) 45' (yellow-red card) 54'; Alessio Zini (yellow card) 60'	Stadium: Stadio Cino e Lillo Del Duca; Attendance: 10,177; Referee: (Italy) Dario Di Francesco

2 November 2025 12	Ravenna	1–0	Ascoli	Ravenna
17:30 CET	Solini (yellow card) 19'; Okaka 88' (yellow card) 89'	Report	Manuel Alagna (yellow card) 24'; Rizzo (yellow card) 68'	Stadium: Stadio Bruno Benelli; Attendance: 4,995; Referee: (Italy) Dario Madonia

7 November 2025 13	Ascoli	1–1	Gubbio	Ascoli Piceno
20:30 CET	Milanese 4'; Damiani (yellow card) 90+4'	Report	Carraro 32'; Bruscagin (yellow card) 35'; Fazzi (yellow card) 87'	Stadium: Stadio Cino e Lillo Del Duca; Attendance: 9,960; Referee: (Italy) Valerio Pezzopane

15 November 2025 14	Rimini	0–2	Ascoli	Rimini
17:30 CET	Mattia Fiorini (yellow card) 49'; Tomas Lepri (yellow card) 84'; Falasco (yellow card) 86'; Jordan Boli (yellow card) 90+8'	Report	Damiani 36'; Gori 38'; Rizzo (yellow card) 44'; Manuel Alagna (yellow card) 58'	Stadium: Stadio Romeo Neri; Attendance: 504; Referee: (Italy) Marco Di Loreto

23 November 2025 15	Ascoli	0–2	Arezzo	Ascoli Piceno
14:30 CET	Silipo (yellow card) 32'; Rizzo (yellow card) 43'; Chakir (yellow card) 89'; Gori (yellow card) 90+4'	Report	Guccione (yellow card) 36'; Cianci (yellow card) 45+1'; Righetti (yellow card) 65'; Pattarello 73'; Chierico 84'	Stadium: Stadio Cino e Lillo Del Duca; Attendance: 10,794; Referee: (Italy) Domenico Castellone

=== Coppa Italia Serie C ===
17 August 2025 First round	Pineto	2–2 (2–3 p)	Ascoli	Pineto
21:00	Schirone 18'; Chakir 80'		D'Uffizi 6'; Corazza 60' (pen.)	Stadium: Stadio Mariani-Pavone; Referee: Bruno Spina

29 October 2025 Second round	Sambenedettese	2–1	Ascoli	San Benedetto del Tronto
15:00	Sbaffo 8'; Amadou Konate 28'	Report	Rizzo 49'; Damiano Menna (yellow card) 40' (yellow-red card) 81'	Stadium: Stadio Riviera delle Palme
