= 2025–26 Vis Pesaro dal 1898 season =

Italian football club season 2025-26

Vis Pesaro dal 1898
2025–26 season
- Manager: Roberto Stellone
- Stadium: Stadio Tonino Benelli
- Serie C Group B: 11th
- Coppa Italia Serie C: First round
- Biggest defeat: Sambenedettese 2–0

The 2025–26 season is the 128th in the history of Vis Pesaro dal 1898 and the club's eighth consecutive season in Serie C of Italian mens' football. In addition to the domestic league, Vis Pesaro competed in the Coppa Italia Serie C. The season began on 16 August 2025.

== Squad ==
=== Transfers In ===
Pos.	Player	Transferred from	Fee	Date	Source
DF	(Italy) Francesco Cusumano	(Italy) Recanatese	Loan return	30 June 2025	
GK	(Italy) Michael Munari	(Italy) Castelfidardo	Loan return	30 June 2025	
FW	(Argentina) Juan Ignacio Molina	(Italy) SPAL	Loan return	30 June 2025	
FW	(Italy) Giovanni Gambino	(Italy) Igea Virtus	Loan return	30 June 2025	
FW	(The Gambia) Sulayman Jallow	(Italy) Arzignano Valchiampo	Free	13 August 2025	
FW	(Italy) Romeo Giovannini	(Italy) Modena	Free	19 August 2025	
MF	(Italy) Alessandro Ventre	(Italy) Juventus U20	Undisclosed	20 August 2025	
DF	(Italy) Andrea Beghetto	(Italy) Pisa	Loan	27 August 2025	
MF	(Italy) Federico Tavernaro	(Italy) Venezia	€100,000	28 August 2025	

=== Transfers Out ===
Pos.	Player	Transferred to	Fee	Date	Source
DF	(Italy) Francesco Coppola	(Italy) Pisa	Loan return	30 June 2025	
GK	(Croatia) Ante Vuković	(Italy) Pisa	Loan return	30 June 2025	
FW	(Italy) Alvin Okoro	(Italy) Venezia	Loan return	30 June 2025	
FW	(Bulgaria) Adrian Raychev	(Italy) Pisa	Loan return	30 June 2025	
MF	(Portugal) Afonso Peixoto	(Italy) Venezia	Loan return	30 June 2025	
MF	(Nigeria) Joel Obi			1 July 2025	
DF	(Italy) Francesco Cusumano	(Italy) Fasano	Free	18 July 2025	
MF	(Italy) Kevin Cannavò	(Italy) Venezia	Undisclosed	14 August 2025	
FW	(Italy) Giovanni Gambino	(Italy) Caratese	Loan	19 August 2025	
GK	(Italy) Michael Munari	(Italy) Cynthialbalonga	Loan	27 August 2025	
FW	(Argentina) Juan Ignacio Molina	(Italy) Siracusa	Loan	28 August 2025	
MF	(Italy) Giulio Camarlinghi		Contract terminated	13 September 2025	

== Friendlies ==
27 July 2025	Salernitana	2–0	Vis Pesaro	Cascia
17:30 UTC+2	Achik 21'; Matino 31'	Report		Stadium: centro sportivo Country House Elite

1 August 2025	Bologna	2–3	Vis Pesaro

== Competitions ==
=== Overall record ===
Competition	First match	Last match	Starting round	Record							
Competition	First match	Last match	Starting round	Pld	W	D	L	GF	GA	GD	Win %
Serie C	22 August 2025	26 April 2026	Matchday 1	5	1	3	1	4	2	+2	20.00
Coppa Italia Serie C	16 August 2025		First round	1	0	0	1	0	2	−2	0.00
Total				6	1	3	2	4	4	+0	16.67

Last updated: 20 September 2025
Source: Competitions

=== Serie C ===
==== Results summary ====
Overall								Home						Away					
Pld	W	D	L	GF	GA	GD	Pts	W	D	L	GF	GA	GD	W	D	L	GF	GA	GD
5	1	3	1	4	2	+2	6	1	2	0	3	0	+3	0	1	1	1	2	−1

Last updated: 20 September 2025.

==== Results by round ====
Round	1	2	3	4	5	6
Ground	A	H	A	H	H	A
Result	D	D	L	W	D	
Position	7	14	17	8	11	

Updated to match(es) played on 20 September 2025. Source:
A = Away; H = Home; W = Win; D = Draw; L = Loss

==== Matches ====
The competition draw was held on 28 July 2025.

22 August 2025 1	Pineto	1–1	Vis Pesaro	Pineto
21:15 UTC+2	Germinario 17'		Jallow 8'	Stadium: Stadio Mimmo Pavone-Alessandro Mariani; Attendance: 702; Referee: Maria Marotta

29 August 2025 2	Vis Pesaro	0–0	Rimini	Pesaro
21:00 UTC+2				Stadium: Stadio Tonino Benelli; Attendance: 2,384; Referee: Andrea Terribile

6 September 2025 3	Arezzo	1–0	Vis Pesaro	Arezzo
17:38 UTC+2	Ravasio 80'			Stadium: Stadio Città di Arezzo; Attendance: 4,500; Referee: Alessandro Pizzi
Note: The match was delayed from its original 17:30 kick-off time due to a technical problem.

14 September 2025 4	Vis Pesaro	3–0	Livorno	Pesaro
17:30 UTC+2	Stabile 2'; Paganini 31'; Vezzoni 87'		Noce (red card) 8'	Stadium: Stadio Tonino Benelli; Attendance: 2,003; Referee: Francesco Zago

20 September 2025 5	Vis Pesaro	0–0	Pianese	Pesaro
15:00 UTC+2				Stadium: Stadio Tonino Benelli; Referee: Davide Gandino

23 September 2025 6	Forlì	v	Vis Pesaro	Forlì
18:30 UTC+2				Stadium: Stadio Tullo Morgagni

=== Coppa Italia Serie C ===
16 August 2025 First round	Sambenedettese	2–0	Vis Pesaro	San Benedetto del Tronto
21:00 UTC+2	Alfieri 51'; Eusepi 83'			Stadium: Stadio Riviera delle Palme; Referee: Enrico Eremitaggio
