= Fabio Abiuso =

Italian footballer (born 2003)

Personal information
- Date of birth: 2 February 2003 (age 23)
- Place of birth: Sassuolo, Italy
- Height: 1.85 m (6 ft 1 in)
- Position: Forward

Team information
- Current team: Carrarese
- Number: 9

Youth career
- –2017: Sassuolo
- 2017–2018: Reggiana
- 2018–2020: Modena

Senior career*
Years	Team	Apps	(Gls)
2020–2025	Modena	42	(7)
2021–2022	→ Inter Milan (loan)	0	(0)
2022–2023	→ Pergolettese (loan)	30	(7)
2025	→ Sampdoria (loan)	9	(0)
2025–	Carrarese	36	(11)

International career^{‡}
2024	Italy U20	1	(0)
- * Club domestic league appearances and goals as of 13 May 2026 ‡ National team caps and goals as of 21 March 2024

Fabio Abiuso (born 2 February 2003) is an Italian professional footballer who plays as a forward for Serie B club Carrarese.

== Club career ==
After playing in the youth sectors of Sassuolo and Reggiana, in 2018 Abiuso joined the youth academy of Modena. He made his first-team debut under Michele Mignani on 27 September 2020, in a Coppa Italia match lost 1–0 against Monopoli. His league debut came on 11 October in a home victory against Ravenna.

On 1 February 2021 Abiuso was loaned to Inter Milan, where he was assigned to the under-18 squad. On 5 August of the same year, after renewing his contract with Modena until 2024, he was loaned again to Inter. There, Abiuso stood out individually and won the Primavera 1 championship with the Nerazzurri's under-19 squad.

Not redeemed by Inter, Abiuso returned to Modena and, on 31 August 2022, was loaned to Serie C side Pergolettese. On 13 September he scored his first professional goal in a 2–0 win against AlbinoLeffe.

At the end of the season Abiuso returned to Modena and was included in the first-team squad. He made his Serie B debut on 29 August 2023 away at Cosenza, scoring his first goal for the club, which proved decisive for the win.

After 7 goals in 45 games with the Canarini, on 3 February 2025, Abiuso joined Sampdoria on loan.

On 14 August 2025 Abiuso was signed by Carrarese on a permanent basis, penning a four-year contract.

== International career ==
Abiuso was an Italy youth international, with one cap with the under-20 squad.

== Career statistics ==
As of match played 22 March 2026

Appearances and goals by club, season and competition
Club	Season	League			National cup (Note: Includes Coppa Italia)		Continental		Other		Total	
Club	Season	Division	Apps	Goals	Apps	Goals	Apps	Goals	Apps	Goals	Apps	Goals
Modena	2020–21	Serie C	3	0	1	0	—		—		4	0
Modena	2023–24	Serie B	23	5	1	0	—		—		24	5
Modena	2024–25	Serie B	16	2	1	0	—		—		17	2
Modena	Total		42	7	3	0	—		—		45	7
Pergolettese (loan)	2022–23	Serie C	30	7	0	0	—		1 (Note: Appearance in Serie C play-offs)	0	31	7
Sampdoria (loan)	2024–25	Serie B	9	0	—		—		—		9	0
Carrarese	2025–26	Serie B	30	10	1	0	—		—		31	10
Career total			111	24	4	0	0	0	1	0	116	24
