= Nazzareno Salvatori =

Italian football coach (born 1959)

Personal information
- Full name: Nazzareno Salvatori
- Date of birth: 9 February 1959 (age 67)
- Place of birth: Ascoli Piceno, Italy

Nazzareno Salvatori (born 9 February 1959) is an Italian football coach.

== Career ==
Salvatori was the fitness coach for Brescia, and during this time he coached Pep Guardiola. The Italian attempted to utilise his friendship with Guardiola to set up an agreement to loan players to Livingston whilst the Spaniard was manager of Barcelona, but this did not materialise.

He joined AC Ancona as fitness coach in July 2003, as part of Leonardo Menichini's coaching team.

In June 2008, he was appointed to Roberto Landi's coaching team at Scottish side Livingston. However, he left the post after just one season to pursue a job opportunity with the University of Sports Science in Italy.

The Italian was on Ioan Andone's coaching staff at CSKA Sofia and two spells with Dinamo București between 2010 and 2014.

Salvatori was on the coaching staff of Salernitana in 2012.

He joined Ascoli in 2018, leaving the role in 2023.

In February 2025, he joined the coaching staff of Monticelli Calcio.
