= Tonino Benelli =

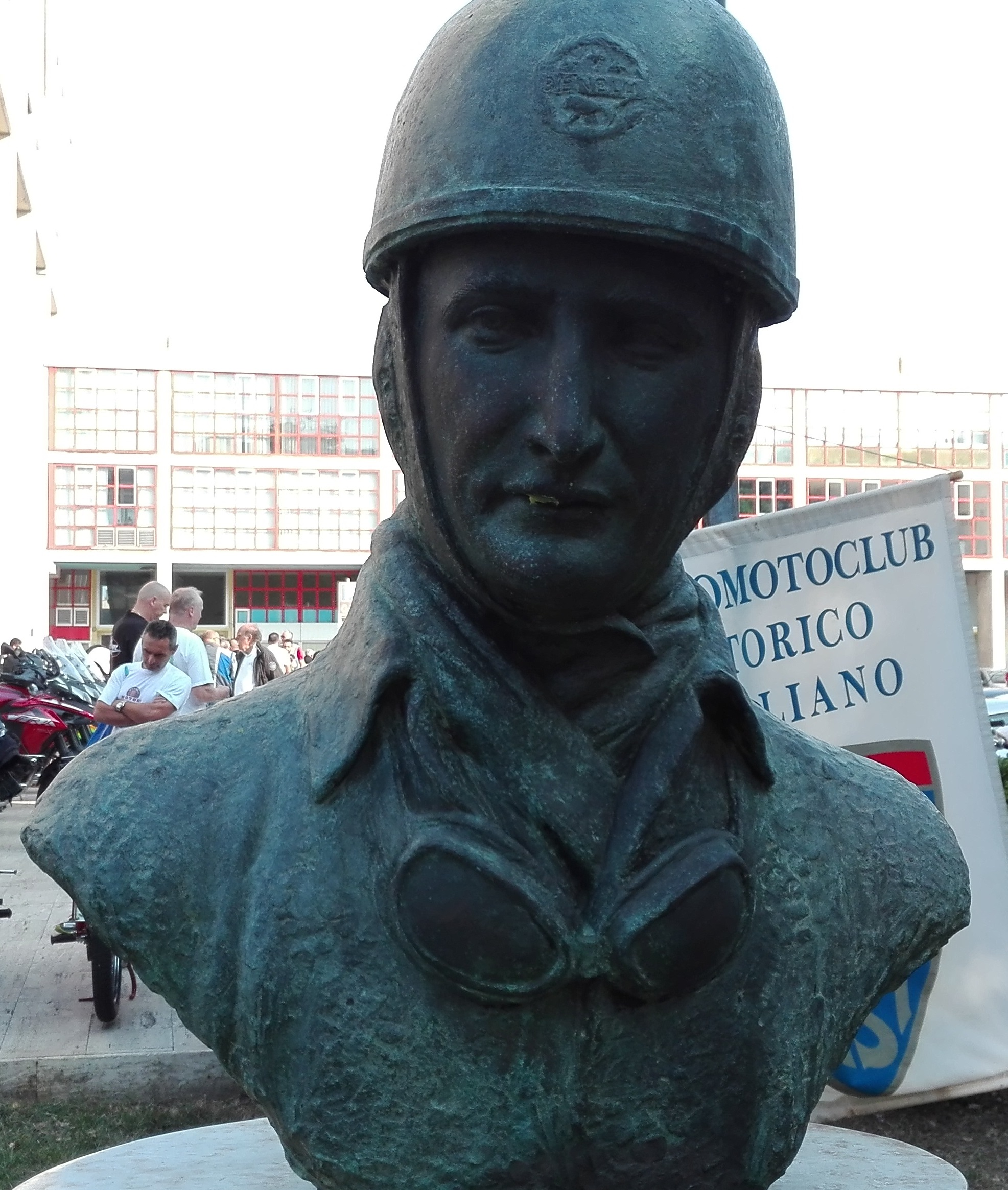
Statue of Tonino Benelli in Pesaro.

Tonino Benelli (8 April 1902 - 27 September 1937) was an Italian motorcycle racer. The Stadio Tonino Benelli in the city of Pesaro is named after him.

== Life and Career ==
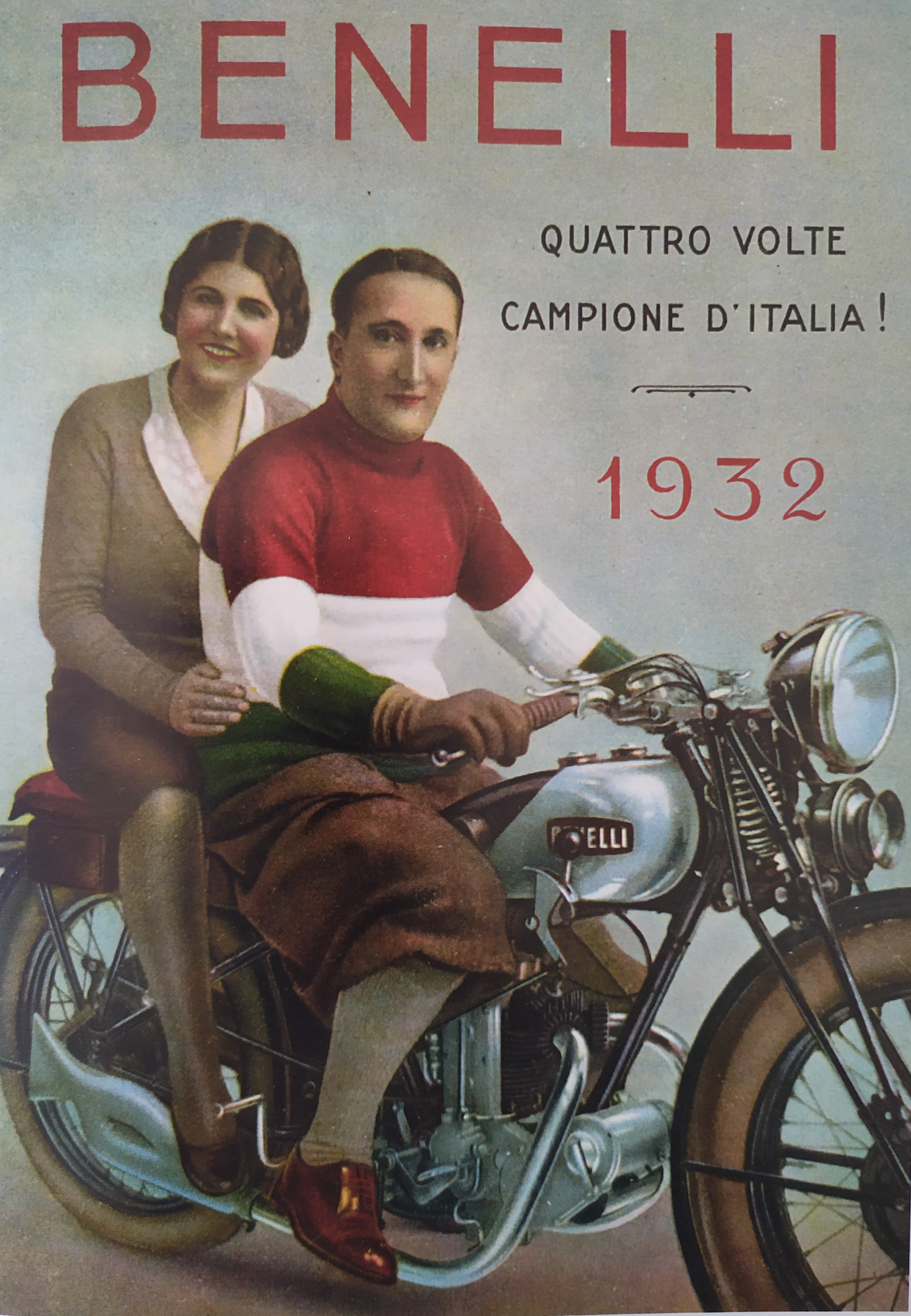
Tonino Benelli with his wife in a 1932 advertising poster.

The youngest of six brothers, Tonino Benelli was a founder of the famous motorcycle company, Benelli of Pesaro. He made his debut in the world of motorcycle cycling in 1923 and among the various successes he won four Italian titles of the class 175 in 1927-1928-1930-1931 riding a Benelli 175, very advanced for those times, with a single-cylinder engine with cascade distribution of gears and overhead camshaft, designed by his older brother, Giuseppe Benelli.

In 1932, Benelli obtained second place in the single event valid for the FICM European Championship won by his teammate Carlo Baschieri riding a 250 twin shaft. In the same year, Benelli would incur a very serious accident on the Tigullio Circuit, which would force him to retire from competitions forever. Among his countless successes, the most prestigious are: a French Grand Prix, four Grand Prix of the Nations, three Circuiti del Lario, two Grand Prix of the Moto Club of Italy and two Royal Rome Grand Prix.

== Death ==
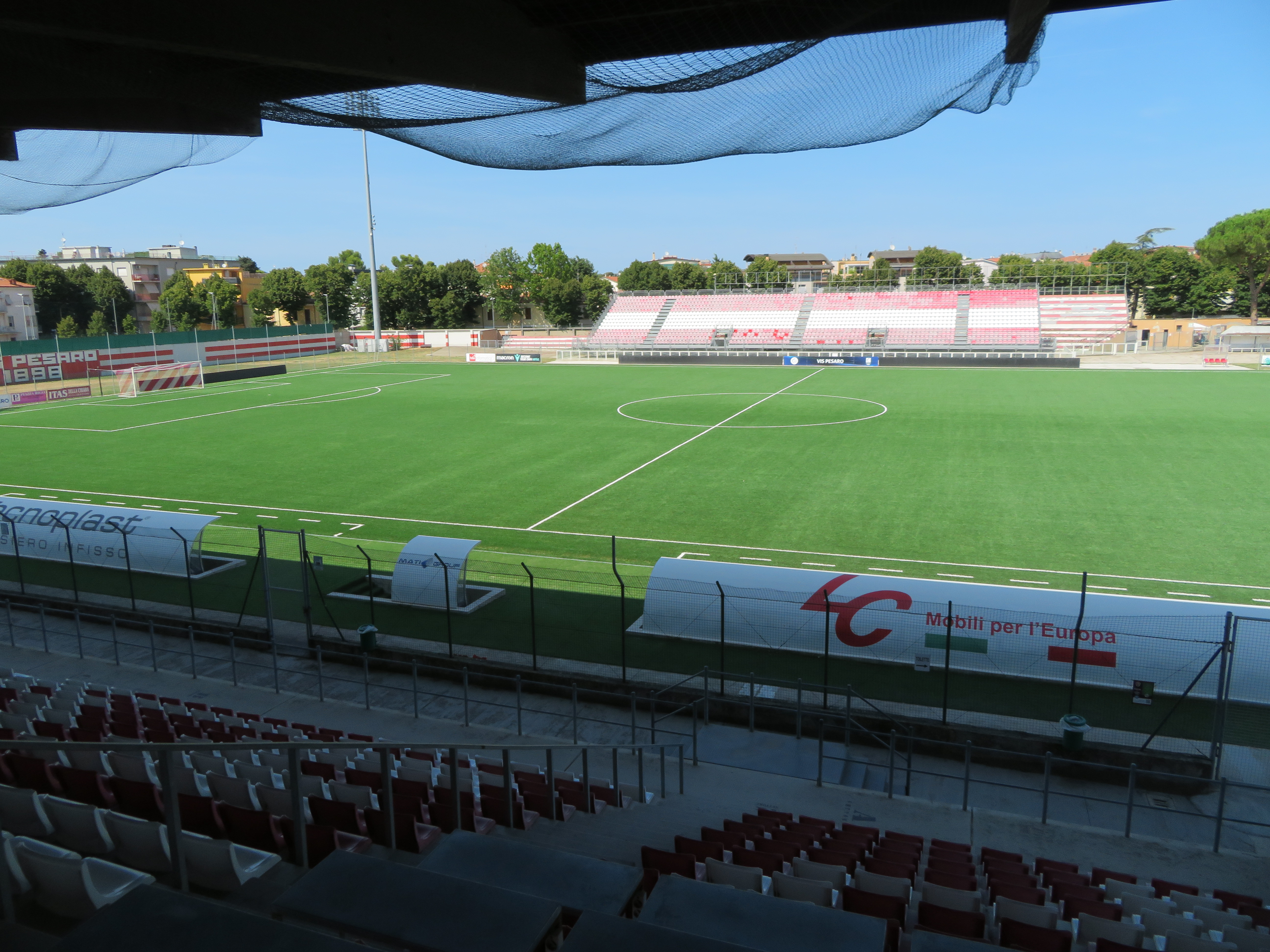
A stadium in Pesaro named after Benelli.

Benelli lost his life in a road accident on 27 September 1937 at the age of 35; returning from Rimini, riding a Benelli 500 Sport. He collided head-on with a car coming from the opposite direction and died instantly. The Tonino Benelli Stadium in the city of Pesaro was named after him.

== Legacy ==
In 2021, a docufilm entitled "Benelli su Benelli" was dedicated to the Pesaro champion, produced by Genoma Film of Bologna, screenplay by Annapaola Fabbri and directed by Marta Miniucchi. The film participated in the 78th Venice Film Festival in September of the same year, with a screening organized by the Authors' Days and the Island of Oedipus.
