= Sulayman Jallow =

Gambian footballer

Personal information
- Date of birth: 30 November 1996 (age 29)
- Place of birth: Tabokoto, The Gambia
- Height: 1.90 m (6 ft 3 in)
- Position: Forward

Team information
- Current team: Reggina (on loan from Vis Pesaro)
- Number: 96

Youth career
- –2014: Real de Banjul

Senior career*
Years	Team	Apps	(Gls)
2015–2016	Olympia Agnonese	15	(6)
2016–2018	Ascoli	1	(0)
2017	→ Viterbese (loan)	15	(1)
2017–2018	→ Gubbio (loan)	23	(0)
2018–2019	Cuneo	33	(0)
2020	Milano City	14	(0)
2020–2023	Montevarchi	89	(32)
2023	Viterbese	11	(0)
2023–2024	Latina	16	(2)
2024	Turris	16	(3)
2024–2025	Audace Cerignola	12	(5)
2025	Arzignano	14	(2)
2025–	Vis Pesaro	20	(4)
2026–	→ Reggina (loan)	0	(0)
- * Club domestic league appearances and goals as of 27 August 2026

Sulayman Jallow (born 30 November 1996) is a Gambian professional footballer who plays as a forward for Serie D Group I club Reggina on loan from Vis Pesaro.

== Club career ==
He made his Serie C debut for Viterbese on 5 February 2017 in a game against Prato.

On 31 January 2020, he signed with Serie D club Milano City.

On 31 January 2023, Jallow returned to Viterbese.

On 26 January 2024, Jallow joined Turris.
