= Bryant Nieling =

Dutch footballer (born 2002)

Personal information
- Date of birth: 31 October 2002 (age 24)
- Place of birth: Sittard, Netherlands
- Position: Centre-back

Team information
- Current team: Modena
- Number: 20

Youth career
- RKFC Lindenheuvel
- Fortuna Sittard

Senior career*
Years	Team	Apps	(Gls)
2022–2024	Fortuna Sittard	0	(0)
2023–2024	→ MVV (loan)	29	(0)
2024–2025	Cambuur	32	(1)
2025–	Modena	22	(2)
- * Club domestic league appearances and goals as of 20:01, 19 February 2026 (UTC)

Bryant Nieling (born 31 October 2002) is a Dutch professional footballer who plays as a centre-back for Serie B club Modena.

== Early life ==
Nieling was born on 31 October 2002 and has a brother. Born in Sittard, the Netherlands.

== Career ==
As a youth player, Nieling joined the youth academy of Dutch side RKFC Lindenheuvel. Following his stint there, he joined the youth academy of Dutch side Fortuna Sittard and was promoted to the club's senior team in 2022, where he made zero league appearanaces and scored zero goals. During the summer of 2023, he was sent on loan to Dutch side MVV, where he made twenty-nine league appearances and scored zero goals.

One year later, he signed for Dutch side Cambuur, where he made thirty-two league appearances and scored one goal. Ahead of the 2025–26 season, he signed for Italian side Modena FC 2018. Italian newspaper Gazzetta di Modena wrote in 2025 that he "immediately carved out a prominent role in Coach Sottil's defense, temporarily displacing one of last season's few bright spots, Cristian Cauz" while playing for the club.
