= Vis Pesaro dal 1898 =

Italian football club

Vis Pesaro
- Full name: Vis Pesaro dal 1898 S.r.l.
- Nicknames: Biancorossi (The white and reds); Vissini; Rossiniani
- Founded: 1898; 128 years ago 2006; 20 years ago as Vis Pesaro dal 1898
- Ground: Stadio Tonino Benelli, Pesaro, Italy
- Capacity: 4,898
- Chairman: Marco Ferri and Roberto Bizzocchi
- Head Coach: Roberto Stellone
- League: Serie C Group B
- 2025–26: Serie C Group B, 10th of 20
- Website: https://www.vispesaro1898.it
Home colours	Away colours	Third colours

Vis Pesaro dal 1898 S.r.l., commonly referred to as Vis Pesaro, is an Italian association football club located in Pesaro, Marche. The club currently plays in Serie C.

The team is the largest in the city and among the oldest in Italy. Vis Pesaro has over thirty participations at the third level of the Italian football championship, without ever having reached Serie B or Serie A in a single group.

== History ==
=== Founding through the 1960s ===
The first name adopted, when founded in 1898, was "Vis Sauro Pesaro", but it later changed its name to "Vis Pesaro" due to the successes it achieved in football. It was initially a multi-sports club event that featured a variety of sports.

The first regional football championship was held in 1912. The first match was played against Alma Juventus Fano on the grounds of the "Campo di Marte" in Soria, which marked the beginning of a rivalry that never subsided between the two teams and the city, leading to the classic derbies of Pesaro.

In the following years, Vis Pesaro moved between Serie D and Serie C, playing home games on the field of Baia Flaminia until 1927, the year of the construction of the municipal stadium "Tonino Benelli", in honor of the motorcyclist from Pesaro, who died during a race.

The club participated in various interregional and Serie C championships, alternating promotions with relegations. In 1958–1959, the team, trained by Mario Mosconi and Adriano Zecca, won the Interregional group D championship (with consequent promotion to Serie C).

=== 1960s to the 2000s ===
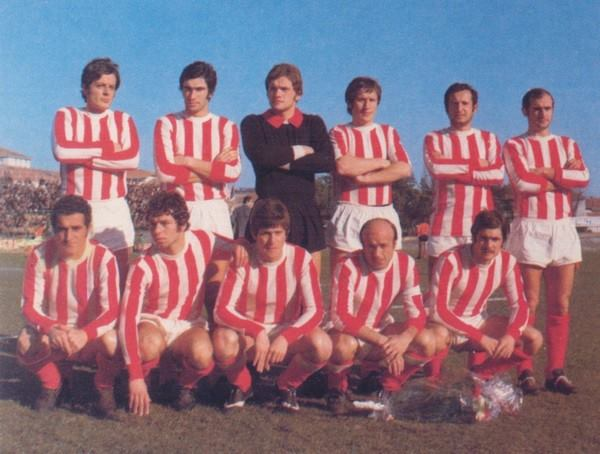
Vis Pesaro 1969-70

The sixties were characterized by the usual alternation of championships in Serie C and Serie D.

In 1960–1961, the team was relegated to Serie D.

The years of particular splendour for Vis Pesaro, under the presidency of Mario Giorgi, were from 1968 to 1970, when Becchetti managed it. The club came close to promotion to Serie B, but was defeated 1–0 in the derby by the leader Sambenedettese, who preceded her by one point in the standings.

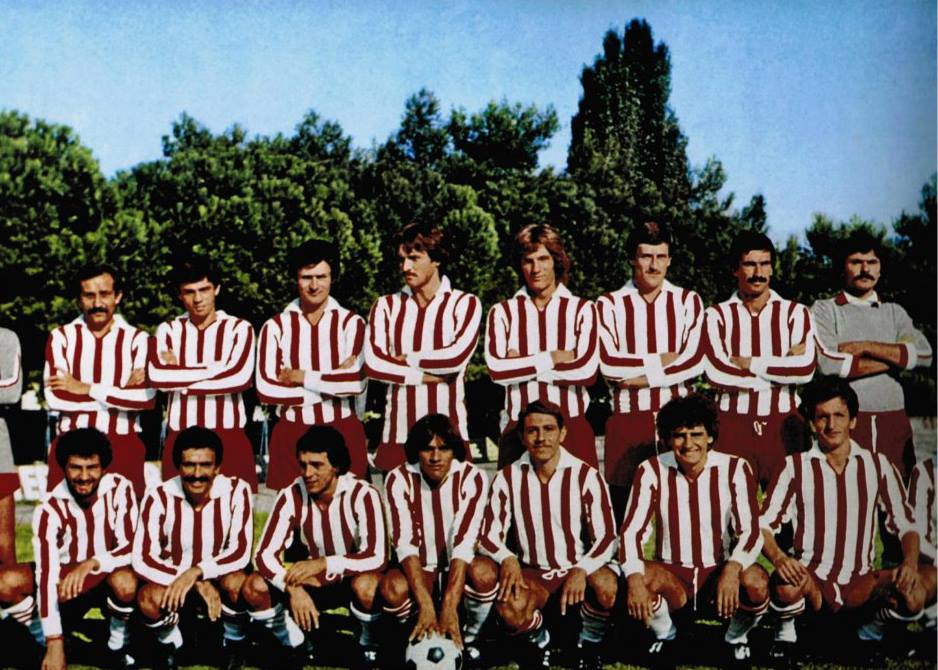
Vis Pesaro 1977-78

Shortly thereafter with the change of presidency, a period of decline also arrived, the team was entrusted to Volturno Diotallevi and then to Luigi Soffrido in the early seventies with the relegation to Serie D.

After dark years, interest around Vis began to grow, with sold-out crowds at the "Benelli", especially in the years between 1986 and 1989, when coach Walter Nicoletti arrived in Pesaro who from Serie D brought the team to Serie C, winning two championships in a row and touching the play-offs and the possible promotion in Serie B in the third season.

In 1993 came the first failure: despite the salvation achieved in C1, the Pesaro management, led by prominent entrepreneurs such as Berloni and Scavolini, decided to sell the company to Fulvio Diamantini, a foreign entrepreneur. The team was eventually excluded from the championship due to economic defaults and had to start from Serie D. Vis Pesaro 1898 S.r.l. was reborn from that rubble, which in the 1993–1994 season returned to Serie C. After a few seasons in Serie C2, Rosettano Navarra, an entrepreneur, became the president. However, the team failed to win Serie C1 despite a good staff led by Giovanni Pagliari. In the 1998-1999 championship, Vis Pesaro's run made it to the play-offs, where it was eliminated by Triestina (the first leg in Pesaro ended 2-2, the return in Trieste 2–1). Navarra himself, tired of the team, then decided to sell the team.

=== The 2000s ===
Starting from the 1999-2000 Serie C2 championship, the team was taken over by the local entrepreneur Giuseppe Bruscoli. Even though at the beginning of the season there were only seven players in the squad, Bruscoli built with great skill a competitive team, which was entrusted to the emerging coach Daniele Arrigoni. The Biancorossi closed the regular season in fourth place, qualifying for the play-offs: playoffs to which they eliminated first Triestina and then Rimini, in a final played in Arezzo, thus earning promotion to Serie C1 after seven years. The final was decided by a goal by captain Armando Ortoli in the 67th minute, to the joy of the approximately 4000 Pesaro fans present.

In Serie C1, Vis Pesaro obtained salvation for four years in a row: the first three years directly at the end of the regular season, the fourth (2003–2004 season) at the play-outs against Paternò, won with no little effort for 2–1 at Benelli, after the 0–0 in Sicilian soil. The following season was disastrous, marked by strikes due to non-payments and poor sporting results, which led directly to the relegation of the Biancorossi to Serie C2. In these years in Serie C1 several coaches followed one another: Sala, Dal Fiuma, Fabbri, the Nemo-Mazzoli pair and finally Lorenzini and Piccioni.

In the summer of 2005, the team was excluded from the championship for not presenting any documentation relating to the payments, catapulting the company back into amateurism. Despite this, the owners remained in their place, continuing to accumulate debts.

In the 2005–2006 season, the Biancorossi played amateur football, an unusual move for a team that had played among professionals for decades. In the darkest year that Pesaro football has ever known, where the municipal administration even denied the playing field to the company for non-payments, Vis Pesaro 1898 went to the relegation play-offs against Ostra. It was relegated after losing 4–1 at home and then winning unnecessarily 1–0 in Ancona. The Pesaro mayor even talked of the possibility of building a second city team. To save the team, the bankruptcy of the Vis Pesaro 1898 was decreed on 24 July 2006, after a series of searches and seizures of documentation that led to fraudulent bankruptcy.

A new team was thus founded, through the acquisition of the rights to participate in the Promotion Championship by the Usi Urbinelli company, based in Borgo Santa Maria, which died out to make room for the new company, the "Associazione Sportiva Dilettantistica Nuova Vis Pesaro 2006" which had Lorenzo Rossi as president.

In the 2006-2007 Promotion championship, Nuova Vis Pesaro, after a poor start, culminating with the dismissal of coach Fontana, was entrusted to Severini and ranked third behind Osimana and Urbania Calcio. After also winning the first edition of the Marche Cup against Cuprense (another finalist of group B), Pesaro won the play-offs in the final against Urbania Calcio (3–2), and therefore promoted to the Marche Championship of Excellence.

During the eight months of the 2007–2008 season, three presidents follow each other: Lorenzo Rossi, Marco Zanotti and Fulvio Urbinelli; 4 coaches replaced: Fulgini, Gianluca De Angelis, Carlo Casadei and in the last matches Maurizio Renzi, in charge as coach of the Juniores Vissina; 49 players are members; in addition to alternating positions and transfer positions with figures such as general manager, team manager, CEO, psychologist.

In the summer of 2008, Vis Pesaro joined Villa Pesaro, a team from the Villa Ceccolini neighbourhood that competes in the Promotion, thereby giving rise to a new team: A.S.D. Futbol Pesaro 1898. The temporary disappearance of the historic brand created a great deal of anger among Pesaro fans.

On 31 May 2009, beating Montegiorgio 1–0 in the regional play-off final of the Promotion championship, A.S.D. Futbol Pesaro 1898 wins promotion to the championship of Excellence. As promised by the company at the beginning of the season, the historic name returned, and, in the 2009–2010 season, was renamed to A.S.D. Vis Pesaro 1898.

=== 2010-Present ===
The 2010–2011 season saw Vis Pesaro return to Serie D.

The 2012–2013 season was the best of the decade for the red and white team, led by Giuseppe Magi. Vis Pesaro ended the season in fifth place and qualified for the play-offs, where it beat Termoli 2–1 in the semifinals but lost 4–1 to Maceratese in the final. The following season is also remembered for the excellent results achieved, despite a squad full of young people: Pesaro closed the championship in sixth place.

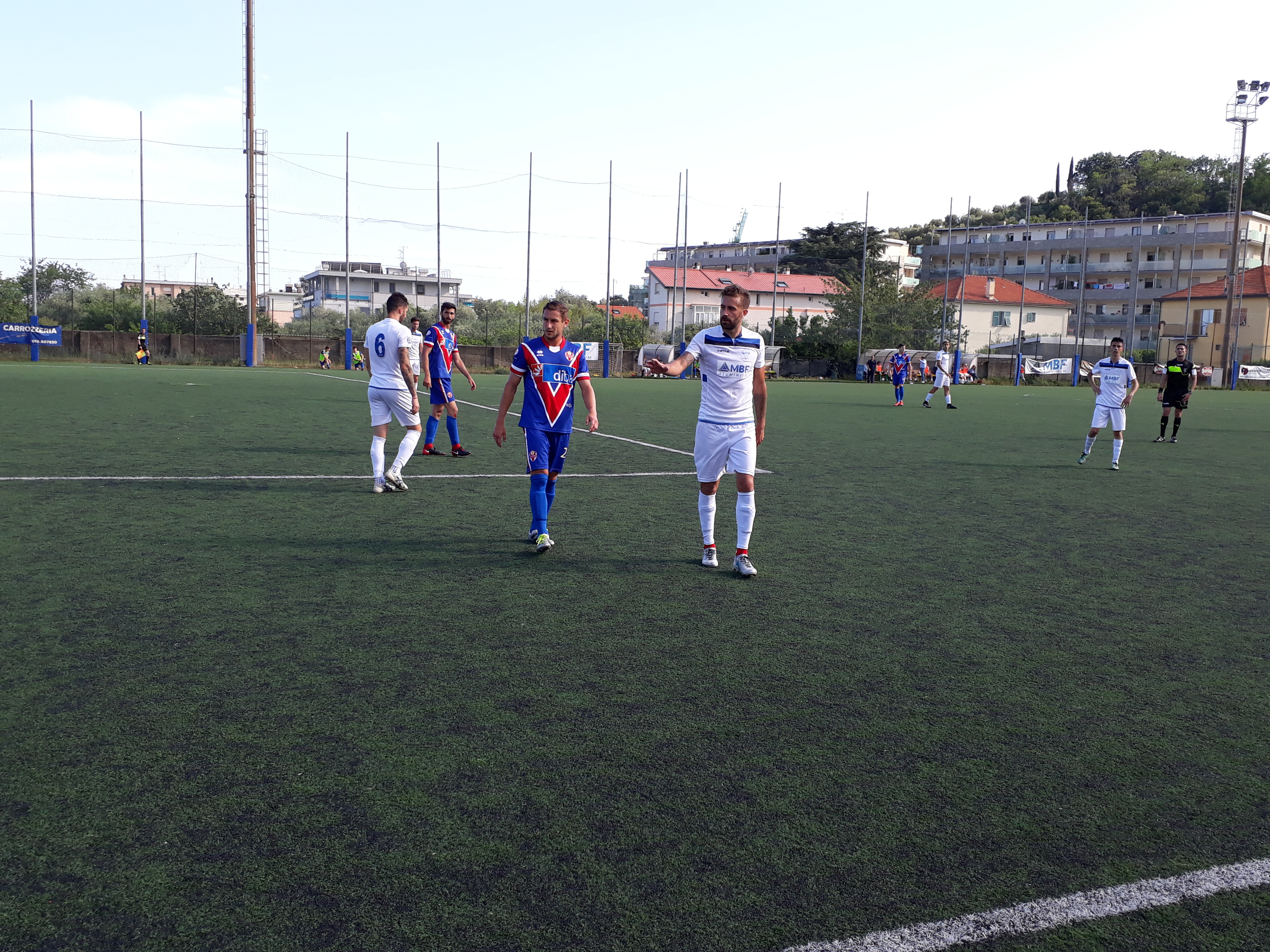
Vis Pesaro in the 2017–2018 season

The 2014-2015 championship was much more difficult: this time, the young players were not enough, and the team was always positioned in the lower standings, despite the change of three coaches (Possanzini, Bonvini, Ceccarini). The team finished penultimate and was relegated directly to Excellence.

On September 1, 2015, Vis Pesaro once again played in Serie D. At the end of the first round, with the third-last team, Pazzaglia is dismissed, and Daniele Amaolo takes over. Under the guidance of Amaolo, Pesaro won 28 points in the second round, finishing eleventh in the league.

In the 2016–2017 season, Vis Pesaro was entrusted to coach David Sassarini, who led the red and white team to the fourth-placed play-offs. In the playoffs, Vis first won the semifinal 1–0 at L'Aquila against San Nicolò and then drew 1–1 at Benelli with Olympia Agnonese, actually winning the final thanks to the best final position in the standings.

The 2017–2018 season saw Pesaro alternate several times in first position with Matelica: on the last day, on May 6, 2018, beating Castelfidardo by 4–2, making a daring overtaking on the Macerate team returning after 13 years in Serie C.

In the 2023–2024 season, Vis Pesaro finished in 17th place. They narrowly escaped relegation through the playoffs and remained in Serie C.

== Stadium ==
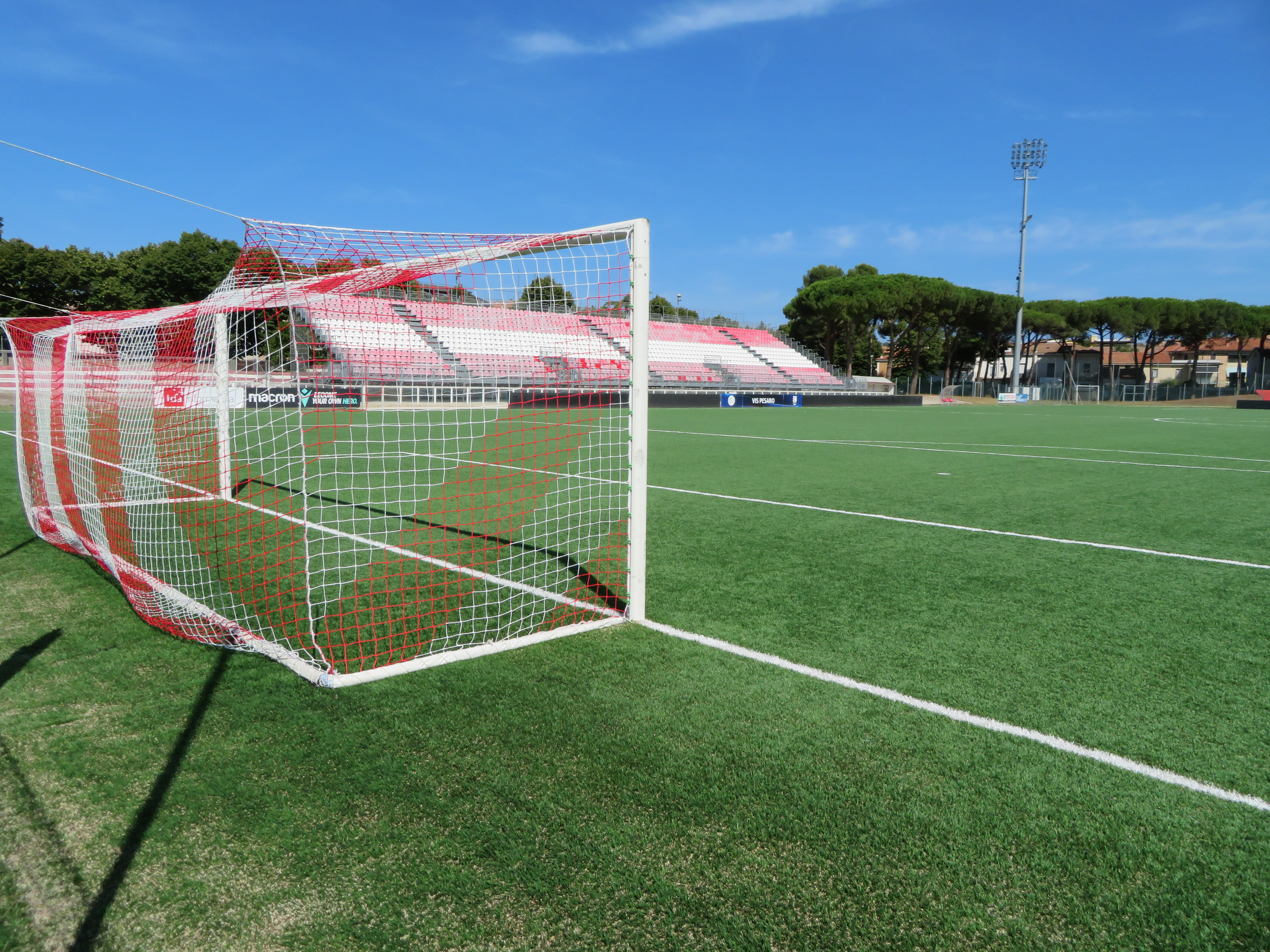
Stadio Tonino Benelli in 2024

The club plays its home matches at the Stadio Tonino Benelli in Pesaro, which has a capacity of approximately 4,898 spectators. The stadium opened in 1927 and underwent a renovation in 2014.

== Colors and badge ==
The club colours are white and red. The first ultras group in Pesaro, born in 1975, was called Inferno Biancorosso. Although Pesaro remained in the lower leagues of Italian football, new groups were founded, maintaining the tradition, even with an essential generational change that is still in place. These are the names of the stable groups of organized tifo in Pesaro in 2020: Pesaro Ultras 1898, Vecchia Guardia 79, Gioventù Pesaro, Porto Pesaro 1982, and Antico Baluardo.

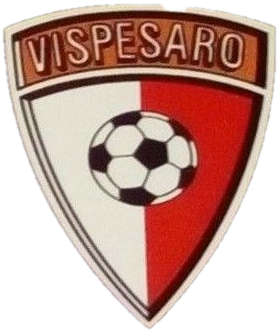
The original Vis Pesaro logo

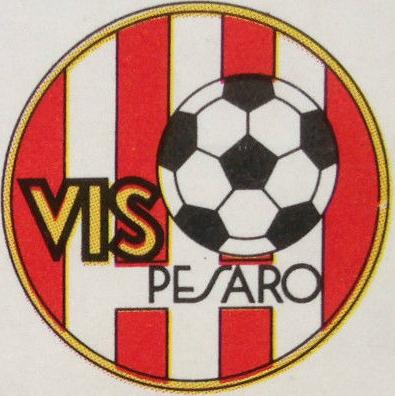
Circular logo used from 1970 to 1990.

Logo adopted in 2006 by the new Vis Pesaro.

The current logo since 2016

== Players ==
=== Current squad ===
As of 28 August 2026

Note: Flags indicate national team as defined under FIFA eligibility rules; some limited exceptions apply. Players may hold more than one non-FIFA nationality.

No.	Pos.	Nation	Player
1	GK	ITA	Mattia Piersanti
3	DF	ITA	Gioacchino Barranco
4	MF	ITA	Christian Nina
5	DF	ITA	Denis Tonucci
6	DF	ITA	Alessandro Tomassini
7	FW	ITA	Manuel Pucciarelli
9	FW	ITA	Francesco Nicastro
10	MF	ITA	Manuel Di Paola
14	FW	ITA	Simone Ascione
16	GK	ITA	Alessandro Guarnone
20	FW	ITA	Romeo Giovannini
21	FW	ITA	Christian Vaccaro
22	GK	ITA	Mattia Mariani
23	DF	ITA	Lorenzo Beghetto
24	MF	ITA	Nicolò Berengo (on loan from Venezia)
27	FW	ITA	Francesco Sculli
28	DF	ITA	Michele Rigione

No.	Pos.	Nation	Player
31	MF	ITA	Nicolò Genovese
33	DF	ITA	Federico Pompilio
36	DF	ITA	Giorgio Bailo
44	GK	ARG	Roman Tombesi
45	MF	ITA	Pietro Giorgini
55	MF	ITA	Edoardo Mariani (on loan from Venezia)
70	FW	ITA	Alessandro Rizza
71	MF	ITA	Federico Tavernaro (on loan from Venezia)
77	FW	ITA	Francesco Dell'Aquila
79	DF	ITA	Sebastiano Ebano
80	MF	ITA	Giovanni Gambino
90	FW	ITA	Nicolò Lari
99	DF	ITA	Alessandro Ventre
—	DF	ITA	Niccolò Conti (on loan from Pisa)
—	MF	ITA	Giacomo Maucci (on loan from Pisa)
—	MF	ITA	Mohamed Thiane

=== Other players under contract ===
Note: Flags indicate national team as defined under FIFA eligibility rules; some limited exceptions apply. Players may hold more than one non-FIFA nationality.

No.	Pos.	Nation	Player
—	FW	ITA	Riccardo Bastianelli

=== Out on loan ===
Note: Flags indicate national team as defined under FIFA eligibility rules; some limited exceptions apply. Players may hold more than one non-FIFA nationality.

No.	Pos.	Nation	Player
—	GK	ITA	Daniel Fratti (at Ars et Labor until 30 June 2027)
—	DF	ITA	Riccardo Zoia (at Salernitana until 30 June 2027)

No.	Pos.	Nation	Player
—	MF	AUS	Massimo Forte (at Gudja United until 30 June 2027)
—	FW	GAM	Sulayman Jallow (at Reggina until 30 June 2027)
