= Gabriele Gori =

Italian footballer

Personal information
- Full name: Gabriele Gori
- Date of birth: 13 February 1999 (age 27)
- Place of birth: Florence, Italy
- Height: 1.87 m (6 ft 2 in)
- Position: Forward

Team information
- Current team: Ascoli
- Number: 35

Youth career
- –2018: Fiorentina

Senior career*
| Years | Team | Apps | (Gls) |
| 2018–2023 | Fiorentina | 0 | (0) |
| 2018–2019 | → Foggia (loan) | 9 | (0) |
| 2019 | → Livorno (loan) | 6 | (3) |
| 2019–2020 | → Arezzo (loan) | 21 | (8) |
| 2020–2021 | → Vicenza (loan) | 27 | (3) |
| 2021–2022 | → Cosenza (loan) | 18 | (5) |
| 2022–2023 | → Reggina (loan) | 34 | (3) |
| 2023–2026 | Avellino | 60 | (16) |
| 2025 | → Südtirol (loan) | 9 | (2) |
| 2025–2026 | → Ascoli (loan) | 21 | (8) |
| 2026– | Ascoli | 14 | (5) |

International career
| 2014 | Italy U15 | 1 | (0) |
| 2014–2015 | Italy U16 | 12 | (1) |
| 2015–2016 | Italy U17 | 11 | (0) |
| 2016–2017 | Italy U18 | 7 | (4) |
| 2017–2018 | Italy U19 | 6 | (0) |
| 2018–2019 | Italy U20 | 5 | (1) |
- * Club domestic league appearances and goals as of 30 April 2026

Gabriele Gori (born 13 February 1999) is an Italian footballer who plays as a forward for Serie B club Ascoli.

== Club career ==
=== Fiorentina ===
He is a product of Fiorentina youth squads and started playing for their Under-19 team in the 2016–17 season. Late in the 2017–18 Serie A season, he made some appearances on the bench for Fiorentina's senior team, but did not see any time on the field.

==== Loan to Foggia ====
On 16 July 2018, he joined Serie B club Foggia on a season-long loan. He made his Serie B debut for Foggia on 26 August 2018 in a game against Carpi as a starter. He played 9 league games for Foggia in the first part of the season, 3 of them as a starter.

==== Loan to Livorno ====
On 31 January 2019, he moved on another Serie B loan to Livorno.

==== Loan to Arezzo ====
On 2 September 2019, he joined Arezzo on loan.

==== Loan to Vicenza ====
On 1 September 2020, he was loaned to Vicenza.

==== Loan to Cosenza ====
On 13 August 2021, he went to Cosenza on loan.

=== Avellino ===
On 28 August 2023, Gori signed a three-year contract with Avellino.

==== Loan to Südtirol ====
On 31 January 2025, Gori moved to Südtirol on loan with an option to buy.

=== Ascoli ===
On 2 February 2026, Gori signed a three-and-a-half-year contract with Ascoli after playing for the club on loan.

== International career ==
He was first called up to represent his country in February 2014 for an Italy national under-15 football team friendly. After playing more friendlies for the Under-16 squad, he made appearances for the Under-17 team in the 2016 UEFA European Under-17 Championship qualification, mostly as late substitute. He was not included in the final tournament squad.

For the Under-19 squad, he again made several late-substitute appearances in the 2018 UEFA European Under-19 Championship qualification, but was not included in the final tournament squad.
