= Giorgio Cittadini =

Italian footballer (born 2002)

Personal information
- Date of birth: 18 April 2002 (age 24)
- Place of birth: Gardone Val Trompia, Italy
- Height: 1.93 m (6 ft 4 in)
- Position: Centre-back

Team information
- Current team: Frosinone (on loan from Atalanta)
- Number: 2

Youth career
- –2016: Lumezzane
- 2016–2022: Atalanta

Senior career*
Years	Team	Apps	(Gls)
2022–	Atalanta	2	(0)
2022–2023	→ Modena (loan)	18	(0)
2023–2024	→ Monza (loan)	1	(0)
2024	→ Genoa (loan)	5	(0)
2024–	→ Frosinone (loan)	29	(0)

International career^{‡}
2019–2020	Italy U18	3	(0)
2022	Italy U20	1	(0)
2022	Italy U21	2	(0)
- * Club domestic league appearances and goals as of 12 May 2026 ‡ National team caps and goals as of 19 November 2022

Giorgio Cittadini (born 18 April 2002) is an Italian professional footballer who plays as a centre-back for Serie A club Frosinone, on loan from Atalanta.

== Club career ==
=== Early career and Atalanta ===
Born in Gardone Val Trompia, Cittadini started playing at Lumezzane before joining Atalanta's youth sector in 2016, aged 14. Although he did not play consistently until he joined the under-17 team, he progressively came through the club's youth ranks, winning a national championship and two Super Cups with the under-19 team in 2020 and 2021.

On 9 January 2022, Cittadini made his professional debut for Atalanta, coming in as a 90th-minute substitute in a 6–2 Serie A win against Udinese.

=== Loan to Modena ===
On 7 July 2022, Cittadini joined newly-promoted Serie B club Modena on a season-long loan. Throughout the 2022–23 season, he established himself as a regular starter in the side, being praised for his league performances.

=== Loan to Monza ===
On 4 July 2023, Cittadini was sent on a one-year loan to Monza ahead of the 2023–24 Serie A season.

=== Loan to Genoa ===
On 26 January 2024, Cittadini moved on a new loan to Genoa.

=== Loans to Frosinone ===
On 17 July 2024, Cittadini joined Frosinone on loan. On 1 September 2025, he was loaned to Frosinone again for the 2025–26 season.

== International career ==
Cittadini made three appearances with the Italian under-18 national team in 2019 and 2020.

In June 2022, he received his first call-up to the under-20 national team, subsequently making his debut with the Azzurrini on June 7, coming in as a substitute during the 1–0 home loss against Poland.

On 22 September of the same year, he also made his debut with the under-21 national team, playing the second half of a friendly match against England.

In December 2022, he was involved in a training camp led by the Italian senior national team's manager, Roberto Mancini, and aimed to the most promising national talents.

== Style of play ==
Cittadini is a centre-back, who can play either in a back four or in a back three: he has been mainly regarded for his strength, his positioning and his ball-playing skills.

== Career statistics ==
=== Club ===
As of match played 13 May 2023

Appearances and goals by club, season and competition
Club	Season	League			Coppa Italia		Europe		Total	
Club	Season	Division	Apps	Goals	Apps	Goals	Apps	Goals	Apps	Goals
Atalanta	2021–22	Serie A	2	0	0	0	1 (Note: Appearance(s) in UEFA Europa League)	0	3	0
Modena (loan)	2022–23	Serie B	18	0	2	0	—		20	0
Monza (loan)	2023–24	Serie A	0	0	0	0	—		0	0
Career total			20	0	2	0	1	0	23	0
