= Simone Santoro =

Italian footballer

Personal information
- Date of birth: 20 September 1999 (age 27)
- Place of birth: Messina, Italy
- Height: 1.81 m (5 ft 11 in)
- Position: Midfielder

Team information
- Current team: Modena
- Number: 8

Youth career
- –2019: Palermo

Senior career*
Years	Team	Apps	(Gls)
2017–2019	Palermo	0	(0)
2019–2021	Teramo	62	(3)
2021–2024	Perugia	79	(4)
2024	→ Modena (loan)	15	(0)
2024–	Modena	70	(6)
- * Club domestic league appearances and goals as of 10 May 2026

Simone Santoro (born 20 September 1999) is an Italian professional footballer who plays as a midfielder for Serie B club Modena.

== Career ==
He was raised in the youth system of Palermo and was called up for Serie B games in the 2017–18 and 2018–19 seasons, but did not see any time on the field.

He made his professional Serie C debut for Teramo on 25 August 2019 in a game against Catanzaro.

On 7 August 2021, he signed a three-year contract with Serie B club Perugia. He made his Serie B debut for Perugia on 21 August 2021 against Pordenone.

On 1 February 2024, Santoro moved on loan to Modena, with an option to buy. On 12 June 2024, Modena exercised the option and signed a two-season contract with Santoro.
