= Fabio Ponsi =

Italian footballer (born 2001)

Personal information
- Date of birth: 12 February 2001 (age 25)
- Place of birth: Pietrasanta, Italy
- Height: 1.86 m (6 ft 1 in)
- Position: Left-back

Team information
- Current team: Reggiana (on loan from Catania)
- Number: 33

Youth career
- 2007–2010: AC Lido di Camaiore
- 2010–2021: Fiorentina

Senior career*
Years	Team	Apps	(Gls)
2021–2026	Modena	79	(1)
2026–	Catania	3	(0)
2026–	→ Reggiana (loan)	2	(0)

International career^{‡}
2017–2018	Italy U17	6	(1)
2018–2019	Italy U18	9	(0)
2019–2020	Italy U19	10	(0)
2021–2022	Italy U20	4	(0)
- * Club domestic league appearances and goals as of 30 August 2026 ‡ National team caps and goals as of 28 March 2022

Fabio Ponsi (born 12 February 2001) is an Italian professional footballer who plays as a left-back for Serie C Group B club Reggiana on loan from Catania.

== Club career ==
Ponsi was raised in the youth system of Fiorentina and was first called up to Fiorentina's senior squad late in 2020.

On 20 July 2021, Ponsi signed a three-year contract with Modena in Serie C. Modena was promoted to Serie B for the 2022–23 season.

== International career ==
Ponsi was included in Italy's squad for the 2018 UEFA European Under-17 Championship, but remained on the bench in all games.

== Career statistics ==
As of match played on 11 March 2023

Appearances and goals by club, season and competition
Club	Season	League			National cup		Other		Total	
Club	Season	Division	Apps	Goals	Apps	Goals	Apps	Goals	Apps	Goals
Modena	2021–22	Serie C	23	0	1	0	—		24	0
Modena	2022–23	Serie B	17	0	1	0	—		18	0
Career total			40	0	2	0	0	0	42	0
