= Nicholas Rizzo =

Italian footballer

Personal information
- Date of birth: 11 March 2000 (age 26)
- Place of birth: Esine, Italy
- Height: 1.88 m (6 ft 2 in)
- Position: Defender

Team information
- Current team: Ascoli
- Number: 33

Youth career
- –2019: Inter Milan
- 2019: Genoa

Senior career*
Years	Team	Apps	(Gls)
2019–2023	Genoa	0	(0)
2019–2020	→ Carrarese (loan)	1	(0)
2020–2021	→ Feralpisalò (loan)	20	(1)
2021–2022	→ Virton (loan)	22	(0)
2022–2023	→ SL16 FC (loan)	14	(0)
2023	→ Pro Vercelli (loan)	12	(1)
2023–2025	Triestina	28	(1)
2025	→ Lucchese (loan)	13	(1)
2025–	Ascoli	18	(0)

International career^{‡}
2016	Italy U16	5	(0)
2019	Italy U19	1	(0)
- * Club domestic league appearances and goals as of 30 April 2026 ‡ National team caps and goals as of 14:43, 16 August 2021 (UTC)

Nicholas Rizzo (born 11 March 2000) is an Italian professional footballer who plays as a defender for Serie B club Ascoli.

== Club career ==
On 20 January 2023, Rizzo joined Pro Vercelli on loan.

== Career statistics ==
=== Club ===
As of 16 August 2021

Club	Season	League			National Cup		League Cup		Other		Total	
Club	Season	Division	Apps	Goals	Apps	Goals	Apps	Goals	Apps	Goals	Apps	Goals
Genoa	2019–20	Serie A	0	0	0	0	–		0	0	0	0
Genoa	2020–21	Serie A	0	0	0	0	–		0	0	0	0
Genoa	2021–22	Serie A	0	0	0	0	–		0	0	0	0
Genoa	Total		0	0	0	0	0	0	0	0	0	0
Carrarese (loan)	2019–20	Serie C	1	0	0	0	1 (Note: Appearance(s) in the Coppa Italia Serie C)	0	0	0	2	0
Feralpisalò (loan)	2020–21	Serie C	20	1	2 (Note: Appearances in the Coppa Italia)	0	0	0	0	0	22	1
Virton (loan)	2021–22	Proximus League	10	0	0	0	–		0	0	1	0
Career total			1	0	0	0	0	0	0	0	1	0
