= Steven Nador =

Togolese footballer (born 2002)

Personal information
- Full name: Steven Folly Nador
- Date of birth: 23 June 2002 (age 24)
- Place of birth: Krefeld, Germany
- Height: 1.93 m (6 ft 4 in)
- Position: Midfielder

Team information
- Current team: Modena
- Number: 19

Youth career
- –2020: Lille
- 2021: Chievo
- 2021: SPAL

Senior career*
Years	Team	Apps	(Gls)
2021–2025	SPAL	40	(1)
2022–2023	→ Montevarchi Aquila (loan)	29	(0)
2023	→ Ancona (loan)	15	(0)
2025–	Modena	11	(0)

International career^{‡}
2022–	Togo	1	(0)
- * Club domestic league appearances and goals as of 10 May 2026 ‡ National team caps and goals as of 07:09, 25 September 2022 (UTC)

Steven Folly Nador (born 23 June 2002) is a footballer who plays as a defensive midfielder for Serie B club Modena. Born in Germany, he represents Togo internationally.

== Club career ==
Following the bankruptcy of his club Chievo, in August 2021 Nador joined the Under-19 squad of SPAL.

He made his Serie B debut for SPAL on 6 November 2021 in a game against Cremonese.

On 1 September 2022, Nador was loaned to Serie C side Montevarchi Aquila for the rest of the season.

On 24 August 2023, Nador joined fellow Serie C club Ancona on a season-long loan.

On 3 July 2025, Nador signed a three-season contract with Modena.

== International career ==
On 18 March 2022, Nador was called up to the Togo national team. He debuted with them as a late sub in a friendly 2–1 loss to the Ivory Coast on 25 September 2022.

== Personal life ==
Born in Germany, Nador grew up in France and he is Togolese by descent.
