= Mohammed Chakir =

Italian footballer

Personal information
- Full name: Mohammed Amine Chakir
- Date of birth: 29 October 2000 (age 26)
- Place of birth: Guastalla, Italy
- Height: 1.77 m (5 ft 10 in)
- Position: Forward

Team information
- Current team: Ascoli
- Number: 9

Youth career
- –2018: Reggiana
- 2018–2019: S.P.A.L.

Senior career*
Years	Team	Apps	(Gls)
2017–2018	Reggiana	1	(0)
2019–2021	Legnago Salus	58	(10)
2021–2022	Renate	32	(3)
2022–2023	Pro Patria	21	(1)
2023–2025	Pineto	70	(9)
2025–	Ascoli	31	(5)
- * Club domestic league appearances and goals as of 30 April 2026

Mohammed Chakir (born 29 October 2000) is an Italian professional footballer who plays as a forward for Serie B club Ascoli.

== Club career ==
Formed on Reggiana youth system, Chakir made his first team and Serie C debut on 19 November 2017 against Ravenna.

After a short spell in S.P.A.L. Primavera, in 2019 Chakir signed with Serie D club Legnago Salus, winning the promotion on his first season.

On 31 August 2021, Chakir joined Renate.

On 12 September 2022, Chakir signed a contract with Pro Patria for one season, with an option to extend.

On 2 August 2023, Chakir moved to Pineto.
