= Simone D'Uffizi =

Italian footballer (born 2004)

Personal information
- Date of birth: 15 September 2004 (age 22)
- Place of birth: Rome, Italy
- Height: 1.75 m (5 ft 9 in)
- Positions: Winger; midfielder

Team information
- Current team: Ascoli
- Number: 15

Youth career
- Lodigiani

Senior career*
Years	Team	Apps	(Gls)
2021	Lodigiani		
2021	→ Nuova Florida (loan)	9	(1)
2021–2023	Viterbese	29	(3)
2023–	Ascoli	100	(18)

International career^{‡}
2026–	Italy U21	1	(0)
- * Club domestic league appearances and goals as of 30 April 2026 ‡ National team caps and goals as of 16 November 2026

Simone D'Uffizi (born 15 September 2004) is an Italian professional footballer who plays as a winger or midfielder for Serie B club Ascoli.

== Club career ==
D'Uffizi came through the youth ranks of Lodigiani in Rome, making his senior debut on loan with their neighbour of Nuova Florida in Serie D on 14 April 2021 under head coach Andrea Bussone, at the age of 16—two years younger than the minimum age requirement for youth players in the league. He finished the 2020–21 season with nine appearances and one goal, scored on 13 June 2021 in a 2–1 away win against Savoia.

At the end of the season, he was transferred to the Viterbese, signing a three-year contract with the club. Soon included in the first team squad of the Serie C team, D'Uffizi made his professional debut for the Viterbese on 3 November 2021, replacing Niccolò Ricchi during a 1–0 away Coppa Serie C win against Ancona. In March 2022, he was loaned to SPAL for the Torneo di Viareggio, scoring two goals as his team reached the round of 16.

On 12 July 2023, D'Uffizi moved to Ascoli on a 4-years deal.

== International career ==
D'Uffizi was one of the players who were called-up with the U21s by head coach Silvio Baldini for the friendly matches against France U21 and Belgium U21 on 13 and 16 November 2026 respectively.
