= Stadio Tonino Benelli =

Coordinates: 43.8996°N 12.9055°E

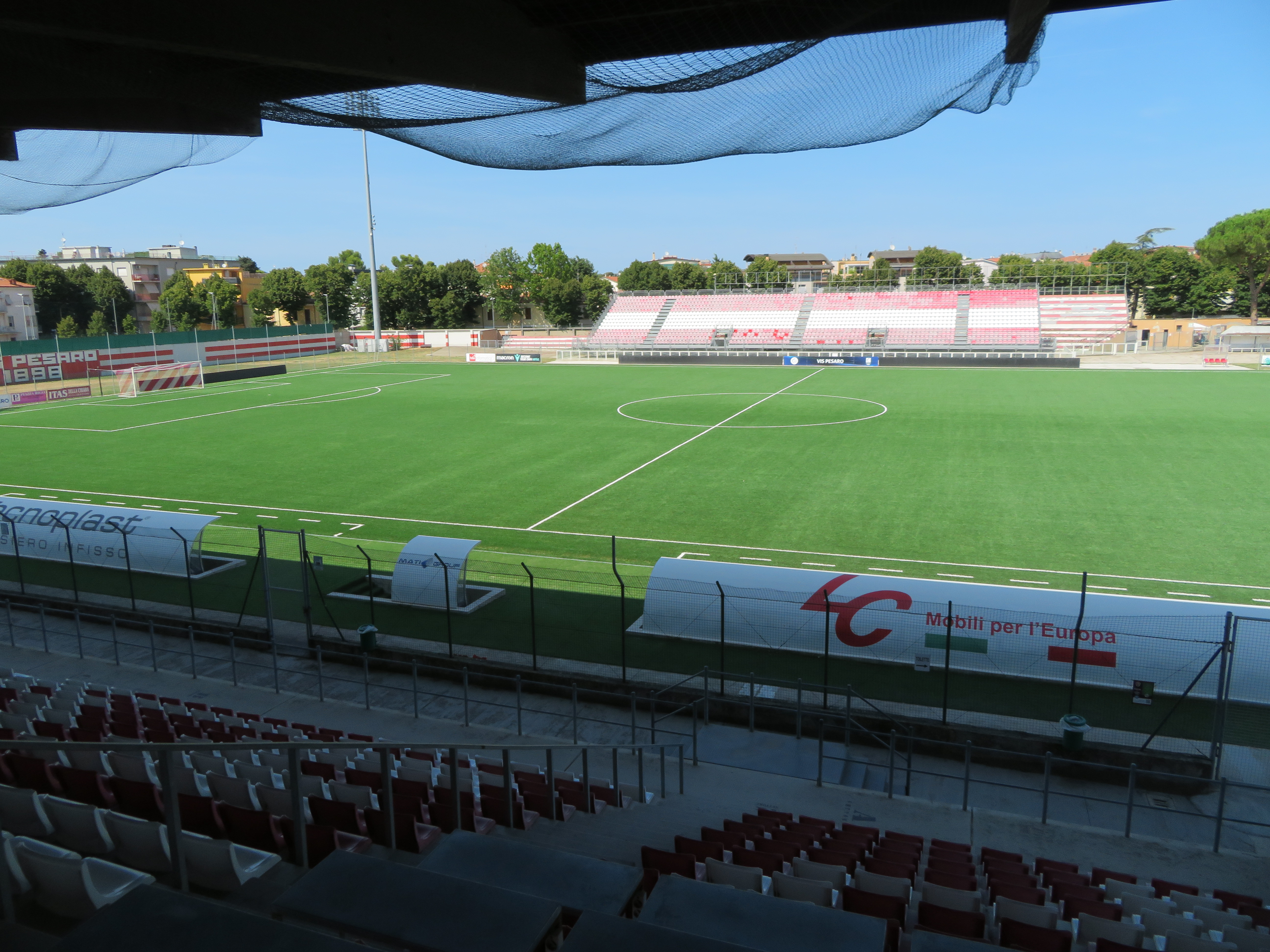
- Interactive map of Stadio Tonino Benelli
- Location: Pesaro, Italy
- Owner: Commune of Pesaro
- Operator: Vis Pesaro 1898
- Capacity: 4,898
- Surface: grass
- Field size: 110 x 61 m

Construction
- Built: 1927
- Renovated: 2014

Tenant
- Vis Pesaro 1898
- Building details

General information
- Location: Via Campo Sportivo; 61100 Pesaro
- Named for: Tonino Benelli

Stadio Tonino Benelli is an arena in Pesaro, Italy. It is primarily used for football, and is the home to Vis Pesaro 1898 of Serie C. It opened in 1927 and holds 4,898 spectators.

It is named after Tonino Benelli, an early 20th-century motorcycle rider born in Pesaro. It was renovated in March 2014.

== Background ==
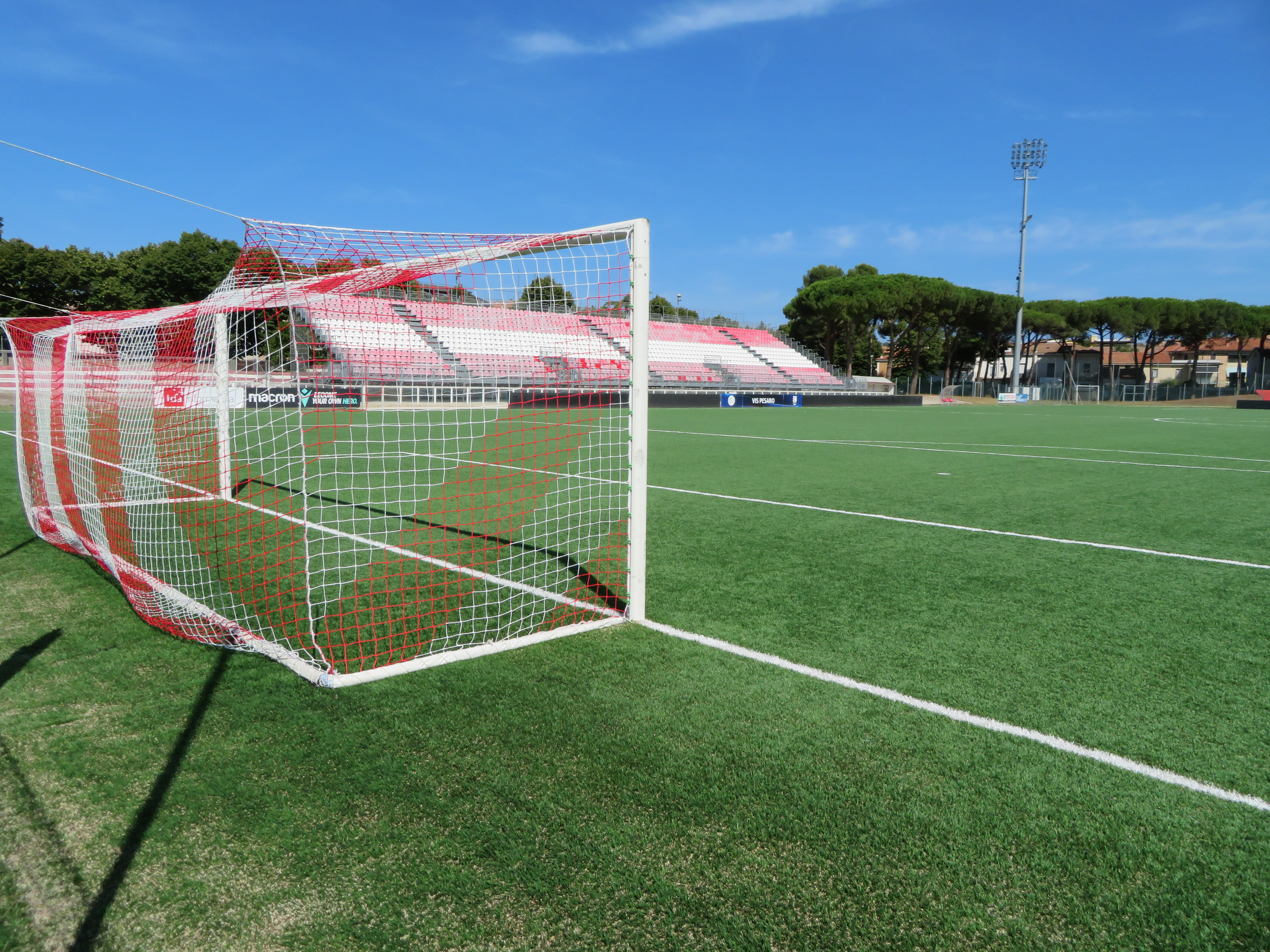
The stadium in 2024

The stadium was built by Romolo Rifelli, a building contractor and president of Vis Pesaro at the time, and began operating in 1927, the year in which Vis Pesaro moved its playing field here from the previous site in Baia Flaminia.

Initially, the stadium was also designed as a velodrome, thanks to the presence of the track that still surrounds the playing field. On 3 July 1982, it hosted the second Italian Superbowl (a gridiron football game), won by Rhinos Milano over Frogs Gallarate with a score of 11-0. In March 2014, renovation work was carried out in the Gradinata prato sector, which involved the removal of the nets between the field and the stands.
