= Lukas Mondele =

Belgian footballer

Personal information
- Full name: Lukas Hubert Mondele Anzun
- Date of birth: 29 March 2004 (age 22)
- Place of birth: Brussels, Belgium
- Height: 1.75 m (5 ft 9 in)
- Position: Midfielder

Team information
- Current team: Cercle Brugge
- Number: 42

Youth career
- –2019: Sporting Charleroi
- 2019–2020: Club Brugge

Senior career*
Years	Team	Apps	(Gls)
2020–2023	Club NXT	8	(0)
2023–2025	Modena	2	(0)
2024–2025	→ Pergolettese (loan)	6	(0)
2025	→ Bilje (loan)	12	(0)
2025–2026	Francs Borains	31	(0)
2026–	Cercle Brugge	2	(1)

International career^{‡}
2019	Belgium U15	4	(0)
2019	Belgium U16	4	(0)
2021–2022	Belgium U18	3	(0)
2021–2022	Belgium U19	5	(0)
- * Club domestic league appearances and goals as of 14 August 2026 ‡ National team caps and goals as of 11 May 2022

Lukas Hubert Mondele Anzun (born 29 March 2004) is a Belgian professional footballer who plays as a midfielder for Belgian Pro League club Cercle Brugge.

== Club career ==
Mondele began his career at the youth academy of Club Brugge. On 22 January 2021, Mondele made his debut for Brugge's reserve side, Club NXT in the Belgian First Division B against Lierse.

On 29 August 2024, Mondele was loaned to Pergolettese in Serie C. On 6 February 2025, he moved on new loan to Bilje in Slovenia.

In July 2025, Mondele returned to Belgium and signed a two-year contract with Francs Borains.

On 29 July 2026, Mondele signed a three-season contract with Cercle Brugge, making it his first Belgian top-tier club.

== Career statistics ==
=== Club ===
As of match played 25 January 2021

Appearances and goals by club, season and competition
Club	Season	League			Cup		Continental		Total	
Club	Season	Division	Apps	Goals	Apps	Goals	Apps	Goals	Apps	Goals
Club NXT	2020–21	Belgian First Division B	1	0	—	—	—	—	1	0
Career total			1	0	0	0	0	0	1	0
