= Cristian Cauz =

Italian footballer (born 1996)

Cristian Căuz
Personal information
- Date of birth: 15 August 1996 (age 30)
- Place of birth: Pordenone, Italy
- Height: 1.88 m (6 ft 2 in)
- Position: Defender

Team information
- Current team: Empoli
- Number: 33

Youth career
- –2013: Pordenone
- 2013–2015: Spezia

Senior career*
Years	Team	Apps	(Gls)
2012–2013	Pordenone	14	(1)
2015–2016	Spezia	19	(0)
2015–2016	→ Pro Piacenza (loan)	2	(0)
2016	→ Massese (loan)	16	(0)
2016–2018	Real Forte Querceta	60	(4)
2018–2020	Parma	0	(0)
2018–2019	→ Piacenza (loan)	22	(0)
2019–2020	→ Trapani (loan)	7	(0)
2020	Ravenna	7	(0)
2020–2021	Lecco	26	(1)
2021–2023	Reggiana	47	(5)
2023–2026	Modena	48	(1)
2026–	Empoli	0	(0)
- * Club domestic league appearances and goals as of 8 May 2026

Cristian Căuz (born 15 August 1996) is an Italian professional footballer who plays as a defender for Serie B club Empoli.

== Career ==
Căuz made his Serie C debut for Pro Piacenza on 18 October 2015 in a game against Pavia.

On 29 July 2019, he joined Serie B side Trapani on loan.

On 16 January 2020, he signed a 1.5-year contract with Serie C club Ravenna.

On 10 August 2020, he moved to Lecco.

On 21 July 2021, he joined to Reggiana.

On 10 July 2023, Cauz signed a two-year deal for Modena.

== Personal life ==
Born in Italy, he is of Romanian descent.

== Honours ==
Reggiana

- Serie C: 2022–23 (group B)
