= Ascoli Calcio 1898 FC =

Italian professional football club

Ascoli
- Full name: Ascoli Calcio 1898 FC S.p.A.
- Nickname: Il Picchio (The Woodpecker)
- Founded: 1898; 128 years ago 2014; 12 years ago, as Ascoli Picchio FC 1898 and on July 18, 2018 as Ascoli Calcio 1898
- Stadium: Stadio Cino e Lillo Del Duca
- Capacity: 12,461
- Owner: Passeri family
- President: Bernardino Passeri (administrator)
- Head coach: Francesco Tomei
- League: Serie B
- 2025–26: Serie C Group B, 2nd of 20 (promoted via play-off)
- Website: www.ascolicalcio1898.it
Home colours	Away colours	Third colours

Ascoli Calcio 1898 FC, commonly referred to as Ascoli, is an Italian football club based in Ascoli Piceno, Marche. The club was formed in 1898 and currently plays in Serie B.

The team traditionally play in vertical black and white stripes.

== History ==
Founded in 1898 as "Candido Augusto Vecchi", the team changed its name to Ascoli Vigor in 1905, U.S. Ascolana in 1921, and A.S. Ascoli in 1945. In 1955, the team was acquired and saved from bankruptcy by publishing magnate, Cino Del Duca, who merged it with his own team forming "Del Duca Ascoli". The stadium still bears his and his brother's name. In 1959 the team finally returned in Serie C for the first time since before the beginning of World War II. In 1971, under the chairmanship of Costantino Rozzi, who had acquired the team three years earlier, the team changed its name to the current one, finally being known as Ascoli Calcio 1898. From that same year, the team, led by Carlo Mazzone as coach, gained two consecutive promotions, being promoted in Serie B, and then Serie A, for the first time. The team stayed in Serie A for two seasons before being once again relegated to Serie B.

Ascoli returned to Serie A in 1978 and enjoyed a seven-year tenure in the top league, during which time they managed to finish a surprising 4th in 1980 and 6th in 1982. Some of the most notable players under the management of Mazzone and Giovan Battista Fabbri included Adelio Moro, Carlo Trevisanello, Alessandro Scanziani, Gianfranco Bellotto, Walter Novellino and Andrea Mandorlini, as well as Walter De Vecchi and Giuseppe Greco. After relegation in 1985, the club immediately bounced back and stayed for four more years. Another return to Serie A followed in 1991 but this lasted only one season. After just missing out on promotion for two years running, the club went into decline and were relegated to Serie C1 in 1995. They would remain there for seven seasons, returning to B as Serie C1/B champions in 2002.

In August 2005, after the sentence of relegation from Serie A for both Genoa and Torino respectively due to fraud and financial troubles, Ascoli, who obtained a place in the Serie B promotion playoffs the previous season under coach Marco Giampaolo, were arbitrarily admitted to Serie A as replacements, finishing a highly credible 12th. After the end of the season, Giampaolo, who gained a reputation as one of the finest young Italian coaches, resigned, being replaced by Attilio Tesser for the 2006/2007 season. Tesser, unable to obtain good results in his time with Ascoli, was fired after a 1–0 loss at home to Empoli F.C. in the 11th matchday, and replaced by veteran coach Nedo Sonetti.

Ascoli were the first team to be officially relegated to Serie B for the 2007–08 season after a 1–0 loss to Torino F.C. on 7 May 2007. They ended the season in nineteenth place, one point above last-placed Messina.

German striker Oliver Bierhoff began his experience in Italian football with Ascoli.

=== Success ===
Even though from a small city of 50,000 people, Ascoli have been able to punch above their weight. Ascoli have competed 16 seasons in Serie A since 1974, with an incredible 4th and 6th spot finish respectively in the seasons of 1979–80 and 1981–82.

To complement Ascoli's success in Serie A, the club has also achieved 2 Cadetti (Serie B Championships) in 1977–78, and 1985–86. The 1977–78 season yielded a record championship with achieving 61 points (2 points for a victory). Ascoli have competed in Serie B 13 times, with a total of 5 promotion seasons.

Ascoli have made way to Serie B with only two winning seasons in Serie C and C1B. These were in 1971–72, and 2001–02.

In a city of 50,000, Ascoli's record home attendance has reached 36,500, equivalent to more than 70% of the city's population. In Serie A this was seen against Juventus and the season in 1982–83 where Ascoli saved themselves from relegation in the last game of the Serie A season against Cagliari, who were subsequently relegated. With stadium restrictions introduced since then, the maximum attendance allowed in the Stadio Cino e Lillo Del Duca is now 21,000–24,000.

Other success were in the Mitropa Cup in 1986–87, the Capodanno Challenge, and the Red Leaf Cup. Ascoli were also finalists in the Anglo-Italia Cup, during Ascoli's last season in Serie B 1994–95, before Ascoli long await in Serie C1 before an emotional return to Serie B for the 2002–03 season.

Under the presidency of Costantino Rozzi, Ascoli Calcio competed in Serie A for 14 of their 16 top-flight seasons, following their promotion from the regional divisions of Marche. During this period, the club integrated several academy graduates into the first team. In the mid-to-late 1980s players like Giuseppe Iachini, Domenico Agostini, Giuseppe Carillo, and Lorenzo Scarafoni, contributed to Ascoli's promotion to Serie A and their league retention. Following Agostini's departure, Carillo and Scarafoni, became regular starters, while Marino Fioravanti and Antonio Aloisi appeared on the bench. Aloisi subsequently played multiple seasons for the club.

Another success is Carlo Mazzone, once at the heart of Del Duca Ascoli's defence playing 9 seasons, led Ascoli for another 10 or so seasons as manager. Mazzone guided Ascoli from Serie C to Serie A, including Ascoli's 6th-placed finish in 1981–82.

=== Bankruptcy and re-birth ===
During the 2013–14 Lega Pro Prima Divisione season, the Court of Ascoli Piceno declared the bankruptcy of the club. The court also estimated the residual value of the club assets were €862,000. A new company, Ascoli Picchio F.C. 1898 successfully bid the assets. FIGC also accepted the admission of the new company to the new season without relegation.

In mid-2015 Ascoli, originally runners-up to Teramo in 2014–15 Lega Pro, were declared champions of group B and promoted after Teramo's relegation for involvement in the 2015 Italian football scandal.

On 14 June 2018, club president Francesco Bellini, after first having declared the sale of the club, and having received several offers from prospective owners, accepted the offer of a Roman entrepreneur of Bricofer Group, Massimo Pulcinelli. On 18 July 2018, the club was officially re-branded as Ascoli Calcio 1898 F.C. S.p.A. ahead of the upcoming 2018–19 season.

In the summer of 2021, the North Sixth Group of entrepreneur Matt Rizzetta, based in New York, already present in Italian football with a stake in Campobasso Calcio, acquired a 31% stake in Ascoli Calcio with an option to increase to 51%. The acquisition combined North Sixth Group with Massimo Pulcinelli and Bricofer, the largest homeware retailer in Italy, to build an ambitious project for Ascoli around the world. Following the acquisition, North Sixth Group negotiated an exclusive content rights agreement with Italian Football TV, the largest online content platform for Italian football fans in North America. The agreement provides Ascoli Calcio the only exclusive content partnership of any Italian professional football club.

== Recent seasons ==
Season	Division	Tier	Pos	Pl	W	D	L	+	-	P	Cup	Note
as Ascoli Picchio FC 1898
2016–17	Serie B	II	16	42	10	19	13	44	49	49	2nd round	
2017–18	Serie B	II	18	42	11	13	18	40	60	46	3rd round	Won the relegation play-out over Virtus Entella. Renamed back to Ascoli Calcio 1898 FC post-season
as Ascoli Calcio 1898 FC
2018–19	Serie B	II	13	36	10	13	13	40	56	43	2nd round	
2019–20	Serie B	II	14	38	13	7	18	50	58	46	4th round	
2020–21	Serie B	II	16	38	11	11	16	37	48	44	2nd round	
2021–22	Serie B	II	6	38	19	8	11	52	42	65	1st round	Eliminated in the Promotion play-offs quarterfinals to Benevento
2022–23	Serie B	II	12	38	12	11	15	40	47	47	2nd round	
2023–24	Serie B	II	↓ 18	38	9	14	15	38	42	41	1st round	Relegated to Serie C
2024–25	Serie C (Group B)	III	15	38	9	13	16	37	46	40	–	
2025–26	Serie C (Group B)	III	↑ 2	36	23	8	5	63	23	77	–	Promoted to Serie B after winning the Promotion play-offs

== Supporters ==
=== Rivalries ===
The biggest derby in Marche is between Ascoli and Sambenedettese (Samb, Samba), although the derby with Ancona is better known. The last time the "derby" was played between Ascoli and Sambenedettese in a league season was in 1986. San Benedetto del Tronto is a city in the province of Ascoli Piceno, and only 20 minutes from the city of Ascoli Piceno; the derby is fuelled by intense local pride and rivalry on both sides, and remains passionate despite the length of time since it was last played.

The Ancona derby was the second largest; Ancona and Ascoli have been the two most successful clubs of Marche. This rivalry stems partly from the fact that Ancona is the capital of Marche, but Ascoli (Asculum) was the capital of ancient Picenun. The battles between the Ascolani and Anconetani have been intense, and there is very much a fight to be La Regina Delle Marche (the queen of Marche).

Fermana is the final significant derby for Ascoli; both teams are located near each other in the province of Ascoli Piceno, alongside San Benedetto del Tronto. Despite the fact that Fermana have historically been weaker than Ascoli, this still is a derby for the Ascolani and Fermani, with both supporters not wanting to lose this game.

Other rivalries include Livorno, Verona, Pescara and Inter.

== Stadium ==
Ascoli play their home matches at the 12,461 capacity, Stadio Cino e Lillo Del Duca, located on the outskirts of Ascoli Piceno.

== Current squad ==
As of 2 October 2026

No.	Pos.	Nation	Player
1	GK	ITA	Samuele Vitale
3	DF	ITA	Manuel Nicoletti
4	MF	ITA	Samuele Damiani
5	DF	ITA	Lorenzo Venuti
7	FW	ITA	Andrea Silipo
8	MF	ITA	Giovanni Corradini
9	FW	ITA	Mohammed Chakir
11	MF	MDA	Sergiu Perciun (on loan from Torino)
12	GK	ITA	Rocco Dente
13	MF	ITA	Gennaro Acampora
14	MF	ITA	Andrea Oliveri (on loan from Atalanta)
15	FW	ITA	Simone D'Uffizi
16	MF	ITA	Antonio Russo
18	MF	ITA	Luca Lo Scalzo
19	DF	BFA	Abdoul Guiebre

No.	Pos.	Nation	Player
21	FW	ITA	Giacomo De Pieri (on loan from Inter Milan)
23	DF	ITA	Manuel Alagna
27	MF	ITA	Matteo Ricci
30	DF	ARG	Marcos Curado (captain)
32	DF	ARG	Federico Gattoni
33	DF	ITA	Nicholas Rizzo
35	FW	ITA	Gabriele Gori
41	GK	SLO	Rok Bržan
45	GK	ITA	Gian Marco Crespi
46	GK	ITA	Davide Barosi
62	MF	ITA	Tommaso Milanese
77	FW	NED	Don Bolsius
99	FW	ITA	Matteo Brunori (on loan from Palermo)
—	GK	ITA	Matteo Raffaelli

=== Out on loan ===
Note: Flags indicate national team as defined under FIFA eligibility rules; some limited exceptions apply. Players may hold more than one non-FIFA nationality.

No.	Pos.	Nation	Player
—	DF	ITA	Andrea Caucci (at Teramo until 30 June 2027)
—	DF	ITA	Gabriele Pagliai (at Catania until 30 June 2027)
—	DF	SLO	Aljaž Tavčar (at Giulianova until 30 June 2027)
—	MF	ITA	Augusto Bando (at Potenza until 30 June 2027)

No.	Pos.	Nation	Player
—	FW	ITA	Luca Conti (at UniPomezia Virtus until 30 June 2027)
—	FW	ITA	Kevin Gorica (at ASD Calcio Tau until 30 June 2027)
—	FW	ITA	Francesco Galuppini (at Ospitaletto until 30 June 2027)

== Coaching staff ==
Updated 15 August 2022

Position	Name
Head coach	(Italy) Massimo Carrera
Assistant coach	(Italy) Mirko Savini
Technical collaborator	(Italy) Fabio Giampieretti
Technical collaborator	(Italy) Andrea Mazzantini
Goalkeeper coach	(Italy) Andrea Aquilanti
Fitness coach	(Italy) Iuri Bartoli
Fitness coach	(Italy) Vincenzo Paradisi
Kinetotherapist	(Italy) Nazzareno Salvatori

== Honours ==
- Serie B:
  - Winners (2): 1977–78, 1985–86
- Serie C:
  - Winners (3): 1971–72, 2001–02, 2014–15
- Mitropa Cup:
  - Winners (1): 1986–87
- Supercoppa di Serie C:
  - Winners (1): 2002

== Divisional movements ==
Series	Years	Last	Promotions	Relegations
A	16	2006–07	–	▼5 (1976, 1985, 1990, 1992, 2007)
B	25	2023–24	▲5 (1974, 1978, 1986, 1991, 2005)	▼3 (1995, 2013, 2024)
C	32	2025–26	▲4 (1972, 2002, 2015, 2026)	▼2 (1933, 1948)
73 out of 90 years of professional football in Italy since 1929
D	15	1958–59	▲3 (1930, 1938, 1959)	▼1 (1955)
E	2	1956–57	▲1 (1957)	never

== Partnership(s) ==
The club is currently partnership with Young Blasters & Sporthood to provide young footballers within the YBSA network access to world-class coaching and development facilities.

== Records ==
- Highest finish: 4th in Serie A, 1979–80
- League victory: 4–1 v Avellino, 1983–84
- League defeat: 7–0 v Juventus, 1983–84
