= Riccardo Gagno =

Italian footballer

Personal information
- Date of birth: 26 July 1997 (age 29)
- Place of birth: Montebelluna, Italy
- Height: 1.79 m (5 ft 10 in)
- Position: Goalkeeper

Team information
- Current team: Vicenza
- Number: 16

Youth career
- –2015: Montebelluna
- 2014–2015: → Brescia (loan)
- 2015–2016: Brescia

Senior career*
Years	Team	Apps	(Gls)
2013–2015	Montebelluna	2	(0)
2014–2015	→ Brescia (loan)	0	(0)
2015–2018	Brescia	1	(0)
2016	→ Grosseto (loan)	16	(0)
2016–2017	→ Poggibonsi (loan)	17	(0)
2017	→ Mestre (loan)	15	(0)
2017–2018	→ Mestre (loan)	14	(0)
2018–2020	Ternana	2	(0)
2019–2020	→ Modena (loan)	24	(0)
2020–2025	Modena	168	(1)
2025–	Vicenza	36	(0)
- * Club domestic league appearances and goals as of 29 April 2026

Riccardo Gagno (born 26 July 1997) is an Italian professional footballer who plays as a goalkeeper for Serie B club Vicenza.

== Club career ==
He made his Serie B debut for Brescia on 26 August 2017 in a game against Avellino.

For 2019–20 season, he joined Modena on loan. On 21 August 2020 Modena bought out his rights on a permanent basis.

On 9 April 2022, he scored an injury-time winning goal in a crucial 2021–22 Serie C game against Imolese, by kicking the ball straight from his own area. The goal allowed Modena to stay four points clear of direct promotion with two games to go.
