= Edoardo Duca =

Italian footballer (born 1997)

Personal information
- Date of birth: 3 May 1997 (age 29)
- Place of birth: Milan, Italy
- Height: 1.78 m (5 ft 10 in)
- Position: Midfielder

Team information
- Current team: Ravenna
- Number: 97

Youth career
- AlbinoLeffe

Senior career*
Years	Team	Apps	(Gls)
2015–2018	Grumellese	47	(4)
2018	OltrepòVoghera	17	(1)
2018	Pavia	14	(2)
2018–2025	Modena	96	(4)
2020–2021	→ Pergolettese (loan)	30	(6)
2025–2026	Juve Stabia	3	(0)
2026	→ Lecco (loan)	16	(3)
2026–	Ravenna	0	(0)
- * Club domestic league appearances and goals as of 29 April 2026

Edoardo Duca (born 3 May 1997) is an Italian professional footballer who plays as a midfielder for Serie C Group B club Ravenna.

== Club career ==
Born in Milan, Duca was formed as a footballer in AlbinoLeffe youth sector. He played three Serie D seasons for Grumellese Calcio and one with OltrepòVoghera.

On 13 December 2018, he joined Serie D club Modena. Modena won the promotion this season, and Duca made his Serie C debut on 9 September 2019 against Padova.

On 16 January 2020, he was loaned to Pergolettese for a year.

On 2 September 2025, Duca signed a two-year contract with Juve Stabia in Serie B. On 15 January 2026, he was loaned by Lecco.
