= Fabio Gerli =

Italian footballer

Personal information
- Date of birth: 23 December 1996 (age 29)
- Place of birth: Rome, Italy
- Height: 1.73 m (5 ft 8 in)
- Position: Midfielder

Team information
- Current team: Cremonese
- Number: 16

Youth career
- Lazio
- Urbetevere
- –2014: Virtus Entella

Senior career*
Years	Team	Apps	(Gls)
2014–2018	Virtus Entella	9	(0)
2015–2016	→ Santarcangelo (loan)	15	(0)
2017	→ Bassano (loan)	13	(0)
2017–2018	→ Robur Siena (loan)	38	(1)
2018–2020	Robur Siena	49	(2)
2020–2026	Modena	202	(6)
2026–	Cremonese	0	(0)

International career
2015	Italy U-19	1	(0)
2016	Italy U-20	2	(0)
- * Club domestic league appearances and goals as of 10 May 2026

Fabio Gerli (born 23 December 1996) is an Italian professional footballer who plays as a midfielder for Serie B club Cremonese.

== Career ==
On 25 August 2020 he joined Modena.

On 14 July 2026, Gerli signed with Cremonese.
