= Romeo Giovannini =

Italian footballer (born 2001)

Personal information
- Date of birth: 28 September 2001 (age 25)
- Place of birth: Savona, Italy
- Height: 1.74 m (5 ft 9 in)
- Position: Forward

Team information
- Current team: Vis Pesaro
- Number: 20

Youth career
- –2018: Savona
- 2018–2019: Carpi

Senior career*
Years	Team	Apps	(Gls)
2019–2021	Carpi	37	(4)
2019–2020	→ Savona (loan)	21	(3)
2021–2025	Modena	43	(1)
2024	→ Virtus Entella (loan)	14	(2)
2024–2025	→ Gubbio (loan)	10	(0)
2025–	Vis Pesaro	32	(1)
- * Club domestic league appearances and goals as of 30 April 2026

Romeo Giovannini (born 28 September 2001) is an Italian professional footballer who plays as a forward for Serie C Group B club Vis Pesaro.

== Club career ==
In 2019 he joined to Carpi. Giovannini made his professional debut on 27 September 2020 against Sambenedettese for Serie C.

In August 2021, he signed with Modena.

On 30 January 2024, Giovannini moved on loan to Virtus Entella. On 30 August 2024, he was loaned to Gubbio.

On 19 August 2025, Giovannini signed a three-year contract with Vis Pesaro.
