= Abdoul Guiebre =

Burkinabé footballer

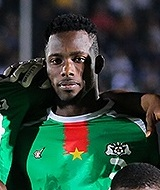

Personal information
- Full name: Abdoul Razack Guiebre
- Date of birth: 17 July 1997 (age 29)
- Place of birth: Bobo-Dioulasso, Burkina Faso
- Height: 1.78 m (5 ft 10 in)
- Position: Winger

Team information
- Current team: Ascoli
- Number: 17

Youth career
- 2008–2010: Forlì
- 2010–2012: Ronco
- 2012–2016: Meldola

Senior career*
Years	Team	Apps	(Gls)
2016–2019	Rimini	87	(10)
2019–2020	Rieti	10	(1)
2020–2022	Monopoli	62	(2)
2022–2025	Modena	10	(0)
2022–2023	→ Reggiana (loan)	34	(2)
2024	→ Bari (loan)	4	(0)
2024–2025	→ Torres (loan)	36	(4)
2025–	Ascoli	30	(0)

International career^{‡}
2022–	Burkina Faso	4	(0)
- * Club domestic league appearances and goals as of 30 April 2026 ‡ National team caps and goals as of 7 April 2022

Abdoul Razack Guiebre (born 17 July 1997) is a Burkinabé professional footballer who plays as a winger for Serie B club Ascoli and the Burkina Faso national team.

== Club career ==
Guiebre moved to Italy at the age of 3 with his family, and began playing football locally. He is a youth product of the academies of Forlì, Ronco and Meldola. He began his senior career with Rimini in 2016, and helped them get promoted twice from the Eccellenza, into the Serie C in 2017. From there, he had a stint with Rieti before transferring to Monopoli in 2020.

On 23 August 2022, Guiebre signed a three-year contract with Modena. On 1 September 2022, he was loaned to Reggiana. On 1 February 2024, Guiebre moved on loan to Bari, with an option to buy. On 19 July 2024, Guiebre was loaned to Torres, with a conditional obligation to buy.

== International career ==
Guiebre was called up to the Burkina Faso national team for a set of friendlies in March 2022. He debuted for the Burkina Faso national team in a friendly 5–0 loss to Kosovo on 24 March 2022.
