= 2025–26 Frosinone Calcio season =

Frosinone Calcio
2025–26 season
- Head coach: Massimiliano Alvini
- Stadium: Stadio Benito Stirpe
- Serie B: 2nd (promoted)
- Coppa Italia: Second round
- Biggest win: Frosinone 2–0 Avellino

In the 2025–26 season, its 98th competitive season, Frosinone Calcio competed in Serie B for a second consecutive year and participated in the Coppa Italia, where it was eliminated by Cagliari in the second round.

== Squad ==
As of 2 September 2025

Note: Flags indicate national team as defined under FIFA eligibility rules; some limited exceptions apply. Players may hold more than one non-FIFA nationality.

No.	Pos.	Nation	Player
1	GK	ALB	Alen Sherri (on loan from Cagliari)
2	DF	ITA	Giorgio Cittadini (on loan from Atalanta)
3	DF	ITA	Gabriele Calvani (on loan from Genoa)
4	DF	ITA	Davide Biraschi
5	DF	ITA	Riccardo Marchizza (captain)
6	DF	ITA	Jacopo Gelli
7	FW	FRA	Farès Ghedjemis
8	MF	GRE	Ilias Koutsoupias
9	FW	ITA	Antonio Raimondo (on loan from Bologna)
10	MF	ITA	Francesco Gelli
11	FW	ITA	Lorenzo Gori
12	GK	BIH	Eldin Lolić
14	MF	ITA	Giacomo Calò (on loan from Cesena)
16	MF	ITA	Matteo Cichella
17	FW	GEO	Giorgi Kvernadze
18	MF	ITA	Filippo Grosso
19	DF	ITA	Niccolò Corrado
20	DF	GAB	Anthony Oyono

No.	Pos.	Nation	Player
21	DF	GAB	Jérémy Oyono
22	GK	ITA	Lorenzo Palmisani
23	DF	ALB	Sergio Kalaj
24	MF	GAM	Abdoulie Ndow
27	FW	BUL	Adrian Raychev (on loan from Pisa)
28	FW	ITA	Massimo Zilli (on loan from Cosenza)
29	FW	VEN	Alejandro Cichero
30	DF	ITA	Ilario Monterisi (vice-captain)
32	FW	ITA	Edoardo Masciangelo
59	DF	DEN	Victor Hegelund
75	GK	ITA	Matteo Pisseri
77	FW	CAN	Damar Dixon
78	FW	ITA	Alessandro Selvini
79	DF	ITA	Gabriele Bracaglia
90	FW	ITA	Edoardo Vergani
92	MF	CIV	Ben Lhassine Kone (on loan from Como)
99	MF	ITA	Kevin Barcella

== Transfers ==
=== Transfers In ===
Pos.	Player	Transferred from	Fee	Date	Source
FW	(Italy) Kevin Barcella	(Switzerland) FC Paradiso	Undisclosed	1 July 2025	
MF	(Greece) Ilias Koutsoupias	(Italy) Catanzaro	Undisclosed	1 July 2025	
MF	(Italy) Edoardo Masciangelo	(Italy) Cittadella	Free	19 July 2025	
GK	(Bosnia and Herzegovina) Eldin Lolić	(Bosnia and Herzegovina) Sloboda Tuzla	Free	25 July 2025	
FW	(Italy) Massimo Zilli	(Italy) Cosenza	Loan	13 August 2025	
FW	(Italy) Edoardo Vergani	(Italy) Südtirol	Undisclosed	27 August 2025	
FW	(Bulgaria) Adrian Raychev	(Italy) Pisa	Loan	28 August 2025	
DF	(Italy) Giorgio Cittadini	(Italy) Atalanta U23	Loan	1 September 2025	
MF	(Ivory Coast) Ben Lhassine Kone	(Italy) Como	Loan	1 September 2025	
GK	(Italy) Matteo Pisseri	Unattached		2 September 2025	
GK	(Albania) Alen Sherri	Cagliari Calcio		4 January 2026	

=== Transfers Out ===
Pos.	Player	Transferred to	Fee	Date	Source
FW	(Slovenia) Tjaš Begić	(Italy) Parma	Loan return	30 June 2025	
FW	(Italy) Frank Tsadjout	(Italy) Cremonese	Loan return	30 June 2025	
MF	(Ivory Coast) Ben Lhassine Kone	(Italy) Como	Loan return	30 June 2025	
DF	(Italy) Giorgio Cittadini	(Italy) Atalanta U23	Loan return	30 June 2025	
MF	(The Gambia) Ebrima Darboe	(Italy) Roma	Loan return	30 June 2025	
DF	(Poland) Przemysław Szymiński	(Poland) Ruch Chorzów		1 July 2025	
MF	(Turkey) İsak Vural	(Italy) Pisa	€4,500,000	1 July 2025	
MF	(Italy) Marco Brescianini	(Italy) Atalanta	€10,000,000	1 July 2025	
DF	(Italy) Gianluca Di Chiara	(Italy) Catanzaro	Free	22 July 2025	
MF	(Italy) Evan Bouabre	(Italy) Latte Dolce	Free	28 July 2025	

== Friendlies ==
31 July 2025	Frosinone	3–0	Casarano

8 August 2025	Frosinone	0–1	Benevento

== Competitions ==
=== Overall record ===
Competition	First match	Last match	Starting round	Final position	Record							
Competition	First match	Last match	Starting round	Final position	Pld	W	D	L	GF	GA	GD	Win %
Serie B	24 August 2025	9 May 2026	Matchday 1		37	22	12	3	71	34	+37	59.46
Coppa Italia	17 August 2025	23 September 2025	First round	Second round	2	1	0	1	2	4	−2	50.00
Total					39	23	12	4	73	38	+35	58.97

Last updated: 1 May 2025
Source: Competitions

=== Serie B ===
==== League table ====
Pos	Team	Pld	W	D	L	GF	GA	GD	Pts	Promotion, qualification or relegation
1	Venezia (C, P)	38	24	10	4	77	31	+46	82	Promotion to Serie A
2	Frosinone (P)	38	23	12	3	76	34	+42	81	Promotion to Serie A
3	Monza (O, P)	38	22	10	6	61	32	+29	76	Qualification for promotion play-offs semi-finals
4	Palermo	38	20	12	6	61	33	+28	72	Qualification for promotion play-offs semi-finals
5	Catanzaro	38	15	14	9	62	51	+11	59	Qualification for promotion play-offs preliminary round

Source: Serie BKT
Rules for classification: 1) Points; 2) Head-to-head points; 3) Head-to-head goal difference; 4) Goal difference; 5) Goals scored; 6) Draw.
(Note: Head-to-head record is used only after all the matches between the teams in question have been played)
(C) Champions; (O) Play-off winners; (P) Promoted

==== Results summary ====
Overall								Home						Away					
Pld	W	D	L	GF	GA	GD	Pts	W	D	L	GF	GA	GD	W	D	L	GF	GA	GD
38	23	12	3	76	34	+42	81	12	5	2	39	15	+24	11	7	1	37	19	+18

==== Results by round ====
Round	1	2	3	4
Ground	H	A	A	H
Result	W	D	W	D
Position	3	4	4	

Updated to match(es) played on 19 September 2025. Source:
A = Away; H = Home; W = Win; D = Draw; L = Loss

==== Matches ====
24 August 2025 1	Frosinone	2–0	Avellino	Frosinone
21:00 UTC+2	Koutsoupias 4'; Marchizza 28'; Monterisi (yellow card) 39'; Barcella (yellow card) 48'; Calvani (red card) 62'; Masciangelo (yellow card) 88'		Besaggio (yellow card) 35'; Kumi (yellow card) 72'	Stadium: Stadio Benito Stirpe; Attendance: 13,087; Referee: Federico Dionisi

30 August 2025 2	Palermo	0–0	Frosinone	Palermo
21:00 UTC+2	Bani (yellow card) 90+5'		Calò (yellow card) 30'; Gelli (yellow card) 75'; Bracaglia (yellow card) 76'	Stadium: Stadio Renzo Barbera; Attendance: 32,181; Referee: Marco Di Bello

13 September 2025 3	Padova	0–1	Frosinone	Padua
15:00 UTC+2	Barreca (yellow card) 45+2'		Bracaglia 37', (yellow card) 76'; Cittadini (yellow card) 43'	Stadium: Stadio Euganeo; Attendance: 6,683; Referee: Davide Di Marco

19 September 2025 4	Frosinone	2–2	Südtirol	Frosinone
19:00 UTC+2	Calò 10' (pen.), (yellow card) 78'; Ghedjemis 30'; Calvani (yellow card) 74'		Martini 72'; Davi (yellow card) 78'; Merkaj 78' (pen.), (yellow card) 79'	Stadium: Stadio Benito Stirpe; Attendance: 9,763; Referee: Andrea Zanotti

27 September 2025 5	Mantova	1–5	Frosinone	Mantua
14:00 UTC+2	Mancuso (penalty missed) 21'; Fiori 54', (yellow card) 62'; Paoletti (yellow card) 87'; Bonfanti (penalty missed) 90+2'		Koutsoupias 8'; Ghedjemis 16'; Bracaglia (yellow card) 20'; Gosso 22'; Calò 43'; Zilli (yellow card) 48'; J. Oyono (yellow card) 57'; Vergani 86'; Monterisi (yellow card) 90+2'	Stadium: Stadio Danilo Martelli; Attendance: 7,119; Referee: Kevin Bonacina

30 September 2025 6	Frosinone	3–1	Cesena	Frosinone
19:30 UTC+2	Raimondo 47', 52'; Ghedjemis 56'; Kvernadze (red card) 62'; Palmisani (yellow card) 88'		Ciervo 76'; Adamo (yellow card) 85'	Stadium: Stadio Benito Stirpe; Attendance: 9,933; Referee: Ivano Pezzuto

4 October 2025 7	Venezia	3–0	Frosinone	Venice
16:00 UTC+2	Compagnon 3'; Yeboah 16'; Šverko (yellow card) 35'; Busio (yellow card) 41'; Casas 53', (yellow card) 70'		Palmisani (yellow card) 15'; Kone (yellow card) 32'; Monterisi (yellow card) 70'; Cichella (yellow card) 84'	Stadium: Stadio Pier Luigi Penzo; Attendance: 7,526; Referee: Juan Luca Sacchi

18 October 2025 8	Frosinone	0–1	Monza	Frosinone
14:00 UTC+2	Koutsoupias (yellow card) 34'		Baldé (yellow card) 24', (goal) 39'; Ravanelli (yellow card) 73'; Zeroli (yellow card) 84'	Stadium: Stadio Benito Stirpe; Attendance: 10,163; Referee: Antonio Rapuano

25 October 2025 9	Sampdoria	1–1	Frosinone	Genoa
14:00 UTC+2	Coda 69'		J. Oyono (yellow card) 22'; Zilli 38'; Gelli (yellow card) 58'; Vergani (yellow card) 85'	Stadium: Stadio Luigi Ferraris; Attendance: 22,675; Referee: Niccolò Turrini

28 October 2025 10	Frosinone	4–0	Virtus Entella	Frosinone
20:30 UTC+2	Raimondo 36'; Bracaglia 58'; Cichella (yellow card) 67'; Zilli 77'; Koutsoupias 80'			Stadium: Stadio Benito Stirpe; Attendance: 9,075; Referee: Simone Galipò

1 November 2025 11	Carrarese	0–2	Frosinone	Carrara
15:00 UTC+2	Arena (yellow card) 14'; Illanes (yellow card) 29'; Cicconi (yellow card) 36'; Zuelli (yellow card) 39'; Finotto (yellow card) 60'		Kone (yellow card) 10'; Calò 41' (pen.); A. Oyono (yellow card) 45+4' (red card) 67'; Ghedjemis 89'	Stadium: Stadio dei Marmi; Attendance: 2,606; Referee: Livio Marinelli

8 November 2025 12	Frosinone	2–2	Modena	Frosinone
15:00 UTC+2	Koutsoupias 9'; Calò 50', (yellow card) 63'; Bracaglia (yellow card) 90+2'; Zilli (yellow card) 90+8'		Zampano 56'; Massolin 89'; Chichizola (yellow card) 89'	Stadium: Stadio Benito Stirpe; Attendance: 11,412; Referee: Alberto Arena

22 November 2025 13	Bari	2–3	Frosinone	Bari
19:30 UTC+2	Verreth 21'; Vicari (yellow card) 34'; Dickmann (yellow card) 42'; Castrovilli 45+3'		Raimondo 12'; Bracaglia 27', (yellow card) 69'; Ghedjemis 42'; A. Oyono (yellow card) 47'; Monterisi (yellow card) 87'	Stadium: Stadio San Nicola; Attendance: 10,816; Referee: Mario Perri

29 November 2025 14	Reggiana	0–1	Frosinone	Reggio Emilia
15:00 UTC+2	Gondo (yellow card) 76'		A. Oyono (yellow card) 10'; Koutsoupias 56', (yellow card) 76'; Monterisi (yellow card) 73'	Stadium: Mapei Stadium – Città del Tricolore; Attendance: 7,850; Referee: Simone Galipò

8 December 2025 15	Frosinone	3–0	Juve Stabia	Frosinone
15:00 UTC+2	Kvernadze 45+1', 65'; Calvani 61'		Mosti (yellow card) 36'; Leone (yellow card) 87'	Stadium: Stadio Benito Stirpe; Attendance: 10,541; Referee: Daniele Perenzoni

14 December 2025 16	Pescara	1–2	Frosinone	Pescara
20:15 UTC+2	Tonin 1'; Valzania (yellow card) 28'; Faraoni (yellow card) 38'; Brosco (yellow card) 90+3'		Koutsoupias 5', (yellow card) 85'; Bracaglia (yellow card) 45'; A. Oyono 56'; Palmisani (yellow card) 80'	Stadium: Stadio Adriatico; Attendance: 6,703; Referee: Paride Tremolada

20 December 2025 17	Frosinone	2–1	Spezia	Frosinone
15:00 UTC+2	Bracaglia 16', (yellow card) 49'; Raimondo (yellow card) 36'; Ghedjemis 73'		Di Serio (yellow card) 75'; Esposito (yellow card) 90+1'; Beruatto 90+3'	Stadium: Stadio Benito Stirpe; Attendance: 10,119; Referee: Marco Piccinini

27 December 2025 18	Empoli	1–1	Frosinone	Empoli
15:00 UTC+2	Yepes (yellow card) 14'; Nasti 24'		Raimondo 16'; Knvernadze (yellow card) 52'; Cittadini (yellow card) 55'; Calò (yellow card) 76'	Stadium: Stadio Carlo Castellani; Attendance: 7,057; Referee: Ivano Pezzuto

10 January 2026 19	Frosinone	2–0	Catanzaro	Frosinone
15:00 UTC+2	A. Oyono (yellow card) 31'; Calvani (yellow card) 65'; Cittadini (yellow card) 75'; Monterisi 81'; Gelli (yellow card) 85'; Bracaglia (yellow card) 90+5'; Ghedjemis 90+8'		Pontisso (yellow card) 44'; Frosinini (red card) 58'; Pigliacelli (yellow card) 74'; Petriccione (yellow card) 79'; Favasuli (yellow card) 90+5'	Stadium: Stadio Benito Stirpe; Attendance: 11,407; Referee: Federico Dionisi

17 January 2026 20	Monza	2–2	Frosinone	Monza
15:00 UTC+2	Hernani 23', (yellow card) 39'; Petagna 73'; Baldé (yellow card) 83'; Pessina (yellow card) 90+2'		Ghedjemis 4'; Bracaglia (yellow card) 12'; Kone (yellow card) 67' (red card) 76'; Calò (yellow card) 74'; Monterisi 88'	Stadium: Stadio Brianteo; Attendance: 5,460; Referee: Antonio Rapuano

24 January 2026 21	Frosinone	1–0	Reggiana	Frosinone
15:00 UTC+2	Kvernadze 57'; Gelli (yellow card) 69'; Bracaglia (yellow card) 79'		Reinhart (yellow card) 23'; Rover (yellow card) 39'; Charlys (yellow card) 74'	Stadium: Stadio Benito Stirpe; Attendance: 10,706; Referee: Maris Sole Ferrieri Caputi

31 January 2026 22	Virtus Entella	1–1	Frosinone	Chiavari
15:00 UTC+2	Marconi (yellow card) 19'; Cuppone 49'; Squizzato (yellow card) 53'		Cichella (yellow card) 19'; Monterisi (yellow card) 47'; Fiori 90+4'	Stadium: Stadio Comunale; Attendance: 1,959; Referee: Simone Galipò

7 February 2026 23	Frosinone	1–2	Venezia	Frosinone
15:00 UTC+2	Raimondo 43'; Oyono (yellow card) 56'		Doumbia (yellow card) 24', (goal) 77'; Cittadini 63' (o.g.); Pérez (yellow card) 80'	Stadium: Stadio Benito Stirpe; Attendance: 13,395; Referee: Maurizio Mariani

11 February 2026 24	Avellino	1–3	Frosinone	Avellino
20:00 UTC+2	Palmiero (yellow card) 33'; Palumbo (yellow card) 69'; Enrici 77'		Kvernadze 16'; Calò 26'; Koutsoupias (yellow card) 47'; Cichella 61'	Stadium: Stadio Partenio-Adriano Lombardi; Attendance: 9,551; Referee: Alberto Arena

11 February 2026 25	Spezia	0–2	Frosinone	La Spezia
15:00 UTC+2	Romano (yellow card) 36'; Ruggero (yellow card) 45+3'; Adamo (yellow card) 77'; Comotto (yellow card) 86'		Calò (yellow card) 32'; Kvernadze 37'; Ghedjemis 55'; Kone (yellow card) 87'	Stadium: Stadio Alberto Picco; Attendance: 8,216; Referee: Federico Dionisi

20 February 2026 26	Frosinone	2–2	Empoli	Frosinone
20:30 UTC+2	Ghedjemis 45+1'; Koutsoupias 60'; Gelli (yellow card) 79'		Shpendi 18', 54'; Magnino (yellow card) 22'; Elia (yellow card) 26'; Curto (yellow card) 45+1'; Obaretin (yellow card) 73'	Stadium: Stadio Benito Stirpe; Attendance: 11,200; Referee: Giuseppe Mucera

1 March 2026 27	Catanzaro	2–2	Frosinone	Catanzaro
15:00 UTC+2	Frosinini 45+2'; Liberali 46'; Iemmello (yellow card) 89'		A. Oyono (yellow card) 28'; Cichella 49'; Fiori 67', (yellow card) 68'; Cittadini (yellow card) 89'; J. Oyono (yellow card) 90+4'	Stadium: Stadio Nicola Ceravolo; Attendance: 9,919; Referee: Simone Galipò

4 March 2026 28	Frosinone	2–2	Pescara	Frosinone
20:00 UTC+2	Calò 85' (pen.); Raimondo 90+4', (yellow card) 90+4'		Di Nardo 2', 33'; Bettella (yellow card) 65'; Brandes (yellow card) 78'; Altare (red card) 82'	Stadium: Stadio Benito Stirpe; Attendance: 11,289; Referee: Davide Di Marco

8 March 2026 29	Frosinone	3–0	Sampdoria	Frosinone
15:00 UTC+2	Fiori 25', (yellow card) 61'; A. Oyono (yellow card) 36'; Raimondo 49'; Corrado 64'		Esposito (yellow card) 48'	Stadium: Stadio Benito Stirpe; Attendance: 12,783; Referee: Federico La Penna

14 March 2026 30	Cesena	2–2	Frosinone	Cesena
15:00 UTC+2	Guidi (yellow card) 35'; Matteo Piacentini (yellow card) 51'; Corazza 59', 79'; Amoran (yellow card) 88'; Francesconi (yellow card) 90+5'		Corrado 40'; Gelli (yellow card) 52'; Ghedjemis 72'	Stadium: Stadio Dino Manuzzi; Attendance: 10,354; Referee: Luca Massimi

18 March 2026 31	Frosinone	2–1	Bari	Frosinone
19:00 UTC+2	Fini 8'; Fiori (yellow card) 29'; Corrado 53'; Calvani (yellow card) 81'		Rao 2'; Dorval (yellow card) 33'; Odenthal (yellow card) 51'; De Pieri (yellow card) 90+5'	Stadium: Stadio Benito Stirpe; Attendance: 10,950; Referee: Fabio Maresca

22 March 2026 32	Südtirol	1–3	Frosinone	Bolzano
19:00 UTC+2	Pecorino (yellow card) 40', (goal) 60'; Bordon (yellow card) 90+7'		Raimondo 7'; Bracaglia (yellow card) 30'; Kvernadze (yellow card) 38'; Gelli (yellow card) 45+1'; Monterisi (yellow card) 50'; Calò (yellow card) 62'; Calò 68'; Ghedjemis 85'; Koutsoupias (yellow card) 89'	Stadium: Stadio Druso; Attendance: 3,666; Referee: Marco Piccinini

5 April 2026 33	Frosinone	2–0	Padova	Frosinone
16:15 UTC+2	Raimondo 25'; Gelli 29', (yellow card) 69'		Crisetig (yellow card) 62'; Varas (yellow card) 88'	Stadium: Stadio Benito Stirpe; Attendance: 11,517; Referee: Niccolò Turrini

10 April 2026 34	Frosinone	1–1	Palermo	Frosinone
16:15 UTC+2	Bracaglia (yellow card) 43'; Ghedjemis 73'; Calò 75'; Barcella (yellow card) 75'; Zilli (yellow card) 82'		Palumbo (yellow card) 16'; Ranocchia (yellow card) 39', (goal) 89'; Peda (yellow card) 90+1'	Stadium: Stadio Benito Stirpe; Attendance: 14,701; Referee: Simone Sozza

18 April 2026 35	Modena	1–2	Frosinone	Modena
14:00 UTC+2	De Luca (yellow card) 28'; Massolin 41'; Colpo (yellow card) 88'; Santoro (yellow card) 90+2'		Cittadini (yellow card) 35'; Ghedjemis 52', 60', (yellow card) 74'; Kvernadze (yellow card) 77'; Calvani (yellow card) 82'	Stadium: Stadio Alberto Braglia; Attendance: 9,582; Referee: Giovanni Ayroldi

25 April 2026 36	Frosinone	3–0	Carrarese	Frosinone
14:00 UTC+2	Ghedjemis (yellow card) 26'; Calò 54' (pen.); Kvernadze (yellow card) 69'; Fiori 71'; Kone 90+6' (pen.)		Bouah (yellow card) 42'; Schiavi (yellow card) 56'; Abiuso (yellow card) 90'	Stadium: Stadio Benito Stirpe; Attendance: 12,830; Referee: Antonio Rapuano

1 May 2026 37	Juve Stabia	0–1	Frosinone	Castellammare di Stabia
14:00 UTC+2			Bracaglia 73'	Stadium: Stadio Romeo Menti; Attendance: 5,237; Referee: Matteo Marcenaro

8 May 2026 38	Frosinone	5–0	Mantova	Frosinone
19:30 UTC+2	Calò 5' (pen.); Castellini 12' (o.g.); Ghedjemis (yellow card) 23', (goal) 57'; Raimondo 71', (yellow card) 72'; Koutsoupias 76', (yellow card) 77'		Castellini (yellow card) 4'; Trimboli (yellow card) 64'	Stadium: Stadio Benito Stirpe; Attendance: 15,365; Referee: Gianluca Manganiello

=== Coppa Italia ===
17 August 2025 First round	Monza	0–1	Frosinone	Monza
18:00			Kvernadze 90+2'	Stadium: Stadio Brianteo; Attendance: 2,797; Referee: Daniele Perenzoni

23 September 2025 Second round	Cagliari	4–1	Frosinone	Cagliari
17:00 UTC+2	Gaetano 2'; Borrelli 67'; Felici 80'; Cavuoti 85'	Report	Vergani 36'	Stadium: Unipol Domus; Attendance: 11,444; Referee: Ermanno Feliciani
