= 2024–25 Frosinone Calcio season =

Frosinone Calcio
2024–25 season
- Manager: Vincenzo Vivarini (until 22 October); Leandro Greco (22 October–17 February)
- Stadium: Stadio Benito Stirpe
- Serie B: 15th
- Coppa Italia: First round

The 2024–25 season was the 97th season in the history of the Frosinone Calcio, and the club's first season in the Serie B after one year. In addition to the domestic league, the club participated in the Coppa Italia.

On 1 July, Frosinone signed its coach Vincenzo Vivarini on a two-season contract.

== Squad ==
Position	Number	Player	Date joined	Further data
GK		(Italy) Michele Cerofolini		
GK		(Italy) Pierluigi Frattali		
GK		(Italy) Lorenzo Palmisani		
DF		(Italy) Gabriele Bracaglia		
DF		(Albania) Sergio Kalaj		
DF		(Italy) Mateus Lusuardi		
DF		(Italy) Evan Bouabre		
DF		(Italy) Riccardo Marchizza		
DF		(Italy) Ilario Monterisi		
DF		(Gabon) Anthony Oyono		
DF		(Poland) Przemysław Szymiński		
DF		(Serbia) Lazar Žaknić		
MF		(Italy) Marco Brescianini		
MF		(Italy) Simone Cangianiello		
MF		(Italy) Matteo Cichella		
MF		(Republic of Ireland) Justin Ferizaj		
MF		(Italy) Francesco Gelli		
MF		(Italy) Hamza Haoudi		
MF		(Turkey) İsak Vural		
FW		(Italy) Luigi Canotto		
FW		(Italy) Giuseppe Caso		
FW		(Venezuela) Alejandro Cichero		
FW		(Albania) Marvin Çuni		
FW		(Italy) Luca Garritano		
FW		(France) Farès Ghedjemis		
FW		(Georgia (country)) Giorgi Kvernadze		
FW		(Italy) Luciani		
FW		(Italy) Alessandro Selvini		
FW		(Italy) Giuseppe Ambrosino		
FW		(Italy) Filippo Distefano		

== Transfers ==
=== In ===
Pos.	Player	Transferred from	Fee	Date	Source
FW	(Italy) Giuseppe Ambrosino	(Italy) Napoli	Loan	24 July 2024	
FW	(Italy) Filippo Distefano	(Italy) Fiorentina	Loan	26 July 2024	

=== Out ===
Pos.	Player	Transferred to	Fee	Date	Source
DF	(Morocco) Abdou Harroui	(Italy) Hellas Verona	Undisclosed	9 July 2024	
DF	(Italy) Simone Romagnoli	(Italy) Sampdoria	Loan	21 July 2024	
MF	(Italy) Luca Mazzitelli	(Italy) Como	Loan	26 July 2024	

== Friendlies ==
=== Pre-season ===
17 July 2024 Friendly	Frosinone (Italy)	6–0	(Italy) Città di Mondragone	Fiuggi
18:00	Marchizza 12', 36'; Ferizaj 63'; Žaknić 73'; Cichero 88', 89'			Referee: Riccardo Reali

21 July 2024 Friendly	Frosinone (Italy)	3–0	(Greece) Volos	Fiuggi
18:00	32' (o.g.); Garritano 48'; Çuni 79'			Stadium: campo di “Capo i Prati” Referee: Mario Ferri

24 July 2024 Friendly	Frosinone (Italy)	3–4	(Italy) Bari	Fiuggi
17:30

31 July 2024 Friendly	Frosinone (Italy)	1–0	(Italy) Potenza
18:00

3 August 2024 Friendly	Frosinone (Italy)	0–2	(Italy) Lazio	Frosinone
20:45			Zaccagni 66'; Vecino 90+3'	Stadium: Stadio Benito Stirpe

== Competitions ==
=== Serie B ===
==== League table ====
Pos	Team	Pld	W	D	L	GF	GA	GD	Pts	Promotion, qualification or relegation
13	Mantova	38	10	14	14	49	58	−9	44	
14	Reggiana	38	11	11	16	42	52	−10	44	
15	Frosinone	38	9	16	13	37	50	−13	43	
16	Salernitana (R)	38	11	9	18	37	47	−10	42	Qualification for relegation play-out
17	Sampdoria (O)	38	8	17	13	38	49	−11	41	Qualification for relegation play-out

Source: Serie BKT
Rules for classification: 1) Points; 2) Head-to-head points; 3) Head-to-head goal difference; 4) Goal difference; 5) Goals scored; 6) Draw.
(Note: Head-to-head record is used only after all the matches between the teams in question have been played)
(O) Play-off winners; (R) Relegated

==== Matches ====
The match schedule was released on 10 July 2024.

18 August 2024 1	Frosinone	v	Sampdoria	Frosinone
20:30				Stadium: Stadio Benito Stirpe

=== Coppa Italia ===
12 August 2024 Round of 32	Frosinone	v	Pisa	Frosinone
18:00				Stadium: Stadio Benito Stirpe
