= Barcella (surname) =

Barcella is a surname. Notable people with the surname include:

- Fabien Barcella (born 1983), French rugby union player
- Giuseppe Barcella (1926–1992), Italian philatelist
- Kevin Barcella (born 2006), Italian footballer
- Lawrence Barcella (1945–2010), assistant United States attorney for the District of Columbia
- Lidia Barcella (born 1997), Italian racewalker
