= Riccardo Marchizza =

Italian footballer

Personal information
- Full name: Riccardo Marchizza
- Date of birth: 26 March 1998 (age 28)
- Place of birth: Rome, Italy
- Height: 1.85 m (6 ft 1 in)
- Positions: Centre-back; left-back

Team information
- Current team: Vicenza
- Number: 5

Youth career
- Roma

Senior career*
Years	Team	Apps	(Gls)
2016–2017	Roma	0	(0)
2017–2023	Sassuolo	10	(0)
2017–2018	→ Avellino (loan)	18	(0)
2018–2019	→ Crotone (loan)	17	(0)
2019–2021	→ Spezia (loan)	47	(0)
2021–2022	→ Empoli (loan)	19	(0)
2023–2026	Frosinone	52	(3)
2026–	Vicenza	1	(0)

International career^{‡}
2013	Italy U16	3	(0)
2015	Italy U18	3	(0)
2016–2017	Italy U19	15	(1)
2017–2018	Italy U20	12	(1)
2018–2021	Italy U21	8	(1)
Medal record
Men's football
Representing Italy
FIFA U-20 World Cup
Third place	2017 South Korea
- * Club domestic league appearances and goals as of 21 August 2026 ‡ National team caps and goals as of 24 March 2021

Riccardo Marchizza (born 26 March 1998) is an Italian professional footballer who plays as a centre-back or left-back for Serie B club Vicenza.

== Club career ==
=== Roma ===
Born in Rome in 1998, Marchizza joined A.S. Roma's youth academy in 2006, at the age of eight.

In July 2016, Marchizza was called up for Roma's first team during the pre-season training camp and scored the winning goal in a friendly game against Terek Grozny. On 8 December 2016, Marchizza made his senior debut against Astra Giurgiu on matchday six of the 2016–17 UEFA Europa League group stage; with Roma already advanced, he replaced Emerson in the 89th minute.

=== Sassuolo ===
In July 2017, Marchizza and Davide Frattesi were signed by Sassuolo for a total fee of €8 million, as part of the deal for Grégoire Defrel. In August 2017, Marchizza was loaned to Serie B club Avellino. On 25 July 2018, he signed with Crotone on loan until 30 June 2019. On 15 July 2019, he joined Spezia on loan.

== International career ==
Marchizza took part at the 2017 FIFA U-20 World Cup with the Italy U20 team, reaching the third place.

Marchizza was first officially called up to Italy U21 on 30 August 2018 for friendlies against Slovakia and Albania. He made his debut with the Italy U21 team on 11 September 2018, in a friendly match won 3–1 against Albania.

== Honours ==
Italy U20

- FIFA U-20 World Cup third place: 2017

== Career statistics ==
=== Club ===
As of match played 4 March 2026

Appearances and goals by club, season and competition
Club	Season	League			Cup		Continental		Total	
Club	Season	Division	Apps	Goals	Apps	Goals	Apps	Goals	Apps	Goals
Roma	2016–17	Serie A	0	0	0	0	1	0	1	0
Sassuolo	2022–23	Serie A	10	0	0	0	—		10	0
Avellino (loan)	2017–18	Serie B	18	0	0	0	—		18	0
Crotone (loan)	2018–19	Serie B	17	0	3	0	—		20	0
Spezia (loan)	2019–20	Serie B	23	0	0	0	—		23	0
Spezia (loan)	2020–21	Serie A	24	0	1	0	—		25	0
Spezia (loan)	Total		47	0	1	0	—		48	0
Empoli (loan)	2021–22	Serie A	19	0	3	0	—		22	0
Frosinone	2023–24	Serie A	13	0	2	0	—		15	0
Frosinone	2024–25	Serie B	25	2	1	0	—		26	2
Frosinone	2025–26	Serie B	14	1	1	0	—		15	1
Frosinone	Total		52	3	4	0	—		56	3
Career total			163	3	11	0	1	0	175	3

== Honours ==
Italy U20

- FIFA U-20 World Cup bronze medals: 2017
