= Ghedjemis =

Ghedjemis is an Algerian surname. Notable people with the surname include:

- Farès Ghedjemis (born 2002), Algerian footballer
- Rayan Ghedjemis (born 2000), Algerian tennis player
