= Ilias Koutsoupias =

Greek footballer (born 2001)

Personal information
- Date of birth: 10 May 2001 (age 25)
- Place of birth: Heraklion, Crete, Greece
- Height: 1.81 m (5 ft 11 in)
- Position: Midfielder

Team information
- Current team: Anderlecht
- Number: 30

Youth career
- –2015: OFI
- 2015–2017: Platanias
- 2017–2020: Virtus Entella
- 2018–2020: → Bologna (loan)

Senior career*
Years	Team	Apps	(Gls)
2020–2023	Virtus Entella	22	(3)
2021–2022	→ Ternana (loan)	22	(1)
2022–2023	→ Benevento (loan)	19	(1)
2023–2024	Benevento	0	(0)
2023–2024	→ Bari (loan)	14	(2)
2024–2025	Catanzaro	11	(0)
2025	→ Frosinone (loan)	6	(1)
2025–2026	Frosinone	34	(8)
2026–	Anderlecht	5	(0)

International career^{‡}
2018	Greece U18	1	(0)
2018	Greece U19	5	(0)
2022	Greece U21	3	(0)
2026–	Greece	1	(0)
- * Club domestic league appearances and goals as of 31 October 2026 ‡ National team caps and goals as of 13 November 2026

Ilias Koutsoupias (Greek: Ηλίας Κουτσουπιάς; born 10 May 2001) is a Greek professional footballer who plays as a midfielder for Belgian Pro League club Anderlecht and the Greece national team.

== Club career ==
Koutsoupias moved to Italy at the age of 16.

He made his Serie B debut for Virtus Entella on 3 October 2020 in a game against Reggiana. He substituted Marco Crimi in the 86th minute. He made his first start for Entella on 20 October 2020 against Frosinone.

On 1 September 2021, Ternana announced the acquisition of 20-year-old central midfielder Ilias Koutsoupias on a long-season loan from Virtus Entella. Although there was a lot of interest from Serie A clubs and the former Bologna midfielder was ready for the big step, it seems that this will take a year longer. On 12 March 2022, he scored his first goal with the club in a 2–0 home win game against Cosenza Calcio.

On 5 July 2022, Koutsoupias moved to Benevento on loan with an obligation to buy.

On 19 August 2023, Koutsoupias was loaned by Benevento to Bari.

On 18 July 2024, Koutsoupias signed a contract with Catanzaro for three seasons, with an option for a fourth. On 15 January 2025, Koutsopias moved to Frosinone on loan, with a conditional obligation to buy.

== Personal life ==
His father, Georgios Koutsoupias, is a former professional footballer.

== Career statistics ==
As of match played 31 October 2026

Appearances and goals by club, season and competition
Club	Season	League			Cup		Europe		Other		Total	
Club	Season	Division	Apps	Goals	Apps	Goals	Apps	Goals	Apps	Goals	Apps	Goals
Virtus Entella	2020–21	Serie B	22	3	1	1	—		—		23	1
Virtus Entella	2021–22	Serie C	1	0	—		—		—		1	0
Virtus Entella	Total		23	3	1	1	—		—		24	4
Ternana (loan)	2021–22	Serie B	22	1	0	0	—		—		22	1
Benevento (loan)	2022–23	Serie B	19	1	1	0	—		—		20	1
Benevento	2023–24	Serie B	0	0	—		—		—		0	0
Bari (loan)	2023–24	Serie B	14	2	0	0	—		—		14	2
Catanzaro	2024–25	Serie B	11	0	0	0	—		—		11	0
Frosinone (loan)	2024–25	Serie B	6	1	—		—		—		6	1
Frosinone	2025–26	Serie B	34	8	2	0	—		—		36	8
Frosinone	2026–27	Serie A	0	0	1	0	—		—		1	0
Frosinone	Total		34	8	3	0	—		—		37	8
Anderlecht	2026–27	Belgian Pro League	5	0	1	0	0	0	—		6	0
Career total			134	16	6	1	0	0	0	0	140	17
