= Italy national under-21 football team =

Italy Under-21
- Nickname(s): Gli Azzurrini (The Little Blues)
- Association: Italian Football Federation (Federazione Italiana Giuoco Calcio – FIGC)
- Head coach: Silvio Baldini
- Captain: Luca Lipani
- Most caps: Andrea Pirlo (46)
- Top scorer: Alberto Gilardino (19)
First colours	Second colours

First international
- U-23: Italy 3–1 Austria (Varese, Italy; 1 November 1970); U-21: Portugal 1–0 Italy (Funchal, Italy; 23 December 1976)

Biggest win
- Italy 7–0 Estonia (Catanzaro, Italy; 23 March 1995); Italy 8–1 Wales (Pavia, Italy; 5 September 2003); Italy 7–0 Liechtenstein (Casarano, Italy; 6 September 2012); San Marino 0–7 Italy (Serravale, San Marino; 16 November 2023); Italy 7–0 San Marino (Latina, Italy; 5 September 2024)

Biggest defeat
- Norway 6–0 Italy (Stavanger, Norway; 5 June 1991) Records for competitive matches only.

Olympic Games
- Appearances: 5 (first in 1992)
- Best result: Bronze medallist (2004)

UEFA U-21 Championship
- Appearances: 23 (first in 1978)
- Best result: Champions (1992, 1994, 1996, 2000, 2004)
Medal record
Italy national under-21 football team
Medal record
Men's Football
Bronze medal – third place	2004 Athens	Team

The Italy national under-21 football team is the national under-21 football team of Italy and is controlled by the Italian Football Federation.

The team competes in the UEFA European Under-21 Championship, held every two years. Italy (along with Spain) is the most successful nation in the history of the competition, with five Championships won (1992, 1994, 1996, 2000 and 2004). Italy has also been twice runner-up of the competition, in 1986 and 2013.

From 1990 to 2004 the team established near-total dominance of European Under-21 football, winning five of the seven tournaments.

Italy's Under-21s played the first match at the new Wembley Stadium, on 24 March 2007, against England Under-21s. The game resulted in a 3–3 draw, with Giampaolo Pazzini scoring all 3 goals for the Azzurrini.

Prior to the 2008 Olympic games, Italy U-21s went on to win the 2008 Toulon Tournament by beating Chile (1–0) in the final. It was the first time they had won this tournament, previously their best had been runner-up on two occasions.

== Honours ==
- UEFA European Under-21 Championship

- Winner: 1992, 1994, 1996, 2000, 2004
- Runner-up: 1986, 2013

- Summer Olympics

- Third place: 2004

- Mediterranean Games

- Winner: 1997

- Maurice Revello Tournament

- Winner: 2008
- Third place: 2011, 2024

== Competitive record ==
=== UEFA European Under-21 Championship record ===
Year	Round	GP	W	D*	L	GS	GA
(Europe) 1978	Quarter-finals	2	0	1	1	1	2
(Europe) 1980	Quarter-finals	2	0	1	1	1	3
(Europe) 1982	Quarter-finals	2	0	1	1	0	1
(Europe) 1984	Semi-finals	4	3	0	1	4	3
(Europe) 1986	Runners-up	6	3	3	0	10	6
(Europe) 1988	Quarter-finals	2	0	1	1	3	4
(Europe) 1990	Semi-finals	2	1	1	2	5	4
(Europe) 1992	Champions	6	5	0	1	9	2
(France) 1994	Champions	4	2	1	1	4	1
(Spain) 1996	Champions	4	2	1	1	4	2
(Romania) 1998	Did not qualify						
(Slovakia) 2000	Champions	4	3	1	0	8	3
(Switzerland) 2002	Semi-finals	4	1	2	1	5	5
(Germany) 2004	Champions	5	4	0	1	10	4
(Portugal) 2006	Group stage	3	1	1	1	4	4
(Netherlands) 2007	Group stage	3	1	1	1	5	4
(Sweden) 2009	Semi-finals	4	2	1	1	4	3
(Denmark) 2011	Did not qualify						
(Israel) 2013	Runners-up	5	3	1	1	9	5
(Czech Republic) 2015	Group stage	3	1	1	1	4	3
(Poland) 2017	Semi-finals	4	2	0	2	5	6
(Italy) 2019	Group stage	3	2	0	1	6	3
(Hungary) (Slovenia) 2021	Quarter-finals	4	1	2	1	8	6
(Romania) (Georgia (country)) 2023	Group stage	3	1	0	2	4	5
(Slovakia) 2025	Quarter-finals	4	2	1	1	5	4
(Albania) (Serbia) 2027	Qualified						
Total	23/25	83	40	21	22	118	83

=== Mediterranean Games Record ===
Year	Round	GP	W	D*	L	GS	GA
(Egypt) 1951 to (Greece) 1991	Senior and U23 tournament						
(France) 1993	Semifinals	4	2	0	2	5	4
(Italy) 1997	Champions	4	3	1	0	11	1
(Tunisia) 2001	Runners-up	4	3	0	1	5	3
(Spain) 2005 to (Italy) 2026	U18/U19/U20/U23 tournament						
Total	3/3	12	8	1	3	21	8

*Denotes draws including knockout matches decided on penalty kicks.

- Gold background color indicates first-place finish. Silver background color indicates second-place finish. Bronze background color indicates third-place finish.
- Red border color indicates tournament was held on home soil.

== Coaches ==
- 1976–1986: Azeglio Vicini
- 1986–1996: Cesare Maldini
- 1996–1997: Rossano Giampaglia
- 1997–2000: Marco Tardelli
- 2000–2006: Claudio Gentile
- 2006–2010: Pierluigi Casiraghi
- 2010–2012: Ciro Ferrara
- 2012–2013: Devis Mangia
- 2013–2019: Luigi Di Biagio
- 2019–2023: Paolo Nicolato
- 2023–2025: Carmine Nunziata
- 2025–present: Silvio Baldini

== Coaching staff ==
Position	Name
Head coach	(Italy) Silvio Baldini
Assistant coach	(Italy) Andrea Barzagli
Technical assistant	(Italy) Mattia Baldini (Italy) Diego Labricciosa (Italy) Mauro Nardini
Goalkeeping coach	(Italy) Stefano Pardini
Fitness coach	(Italy) Vito Azzone
Match analyst	(Italy) Gianluca Mazziotti
Doctors	(Italy) Daniele Mazza (Italy) Vincenzo Santoriello
Physiotherapists	(Italy) Nicola Sanna (Italy) Tommaso Cannata

== Results and fixtures ==
The following is a list of matches played in the past 12 months and future matches that have been scheduled. Only official matches are listed.

=== 2025 ===
14 November 2025 2027 Championship qual.	Poland	2–1	Italy	Szczecin, Poland
16:00	Bogacz 83'; Kuziemka 87'	Report	Pisilli 61'	Stadium: Florian Krygier Municipal Stadium

18 November 2025 2027 Championship qual.	Montenegro	1–4	Italy	Nikšić, Montenegro
18:30	Mrvaljević 37'	Report	Pisilli 16'; Dagasso 60'; Camarda 64'; Fini 74'	Stadium: City Stadium; Referee: Miguel Nogueira (Portugal)

=== 2026 ===
26 March 2026 2027 Championship qual.	Italy	4–0	North Macedonia	Empoli, Italy
18:15	Ndour 3'; Lipani 49'; Ekhator 50'; Fini 86' (pen.)	Report		Stadium: Stadio Carlo Castellani; Attendance: 1,485; Referee: David Dickinson (Scotland)

31 March 2026 2027 Championship qual.	Sweden	0–4	Italy	Borås, Sweden
18:30		Report	Koleosho 19', 22'; Ndour 50'; Lipani 63'	Stadium: Borås Arena; Referee: Simon Bourdeaud'hui (Belgium)

8 June 2026 Friendly	Italy	1–0	Albania	Fontanafredda, Italy
18:15	Calvani 63'	Report		Stadium: Stadio Omero Tognon
Note: Due to caretaker spell of coach Silvio Baldini with main roster, former coach Carmine Nunziata acted as head coach.

1 October 2026 2027 Championship qual.	Armenia	0–1	Italy	Yerevan, Armenia
18:30 (20:30 UTC+4)		Report	Cisse 90+5'	Stadium: Yerevan Football Academy Stadium; Referee: Fotios Polychronis (Greece)

5 October 2026 2027 Championship qual.	Italy	6–2	Poland	Pescara, Italy
18:15	Koleosho 16'; Ndour 27', 54'; Lipani 59'; Fini 66'; Cherubini 86'	Report	Mikołajewski 65'; Żewłakow 85'	Stadium: Stadio Adriatico; Referee: Florian Badstübner (Germany)

13 November 2026 Friendly	France	1–2	Italy	Laval, France
18:30	Versini 61'		Camarda 54'; Lipani 68'	Stadium: Stade Francis Le Basser

16 November 2026 Friendly	Italy	2–2	Belgium	Livorno, Italy
18:15	Cherubini 25'; Ekhator 88' (pen.)	Report	Mirisola 27', 52'	Stadium: Stadio Armando Picchi

== Players ==
Players born in 2004 or later are eligible for the 2027 UEFA European Under-21 Championship. Players in bold have been already capped with the senior team.

=== Current squad ===
The following players were called up for the friendly matches against France and Belgium on 13 and 16 November 2026 respectively.

Caps and goals as of 16 November 2026, after the match against Belgium.

No.	Pos.	Player	Date of birth (age)	Caps	Goals	Club
	GK	Lorenzo Palmisani	12 June 2004 (age 22)	9	0	(Italian Football Federation) Frosinone
	GK	Diego Mascardi	26 September 2006 (age 20)	2	0	(Italian Football Federation) Torino
	GK	Giovanni Daffara	5 December 2004 (age 21)	1	0	(Italian Football Federation) Parma
	GK	Massimo Pessina	25 December 2007 (age 18)	0	0	(Italian Football Federation) Bologna
	DF	**Davide Bartesaghi**	29 December 2005 (age 20)	9	0	(Italian Football Federation) Milan
	DF	**Fabio Chiarodia**	5 June 2005 (age 21)	8	0	(German Football Association) Borussia Mönchengladbach
	DF	**Pietro Comuzzo**	20 February 2005 (age 21)	8	0	(Italian Football Federation) Torino
	DF	**Filippo Mané**	8 March 2005 (age 21)	6	0	(German Football Association) Borussia Dortmund
	DF	Brando Moruzzi	20 July 2004 (age 22)	4	0	(Italian Football Federation) Avellino
	DF	Eddy Kouadio	7 May 2006 (age 20)	2	0	(Italian Football Federation) Monza
	DF	Emanuele Lulli	17 August 2007 (age 19)	2	0	(Italian Football Federation) Roma
	MF	**Luca Lipani** (captain)	18 May 2005 (age 21)	12	5	(Italian Football Federation) Sassuolo
	MF	**Matteo Dagasso**	1 April 2004 (age 22)	10	2	(Italian Football Federation) Venezia
	MF	**Giacomo Faticanti**	31 July 2004 (age 22)	7	0	(Italian Football Federation) Avellino
	MF	Tommaso Berti	7 March 2004 (age 22)	3	1	(Italian Football Federation) Cremonese
	MF	Kevin Zeroli	11 January 2005 (age 21)	3	0	(Italian Football Federation) Südtirol
	MF	Lorenzo Amatucci	5 February 2004 (age 22)	2	0	(Royal Spanish Football Federation) Deportivo A Coruña
	MF	Mattia Mannini	8 July 2006 (age 20)	1	0	(Italian Football Federation) Benevento
	FW	**Seydou Fini**	2 June 2006 (age 20)	14	5	(Italian Football Federation) Frosinone
	FW	**Luigi Cherubini**	15 January 2004 (age 22)	12	2	(Italian Football Federation) Benevento
	FW	**Francesco Camarda**	10 March 2008 (age 18)	8	5	(Italian Football Federation) Milan
	FW	**Jeff Ekhator**	11 November 2006 (age 20)	8	3	(Italian Football Federation) Juventus
	FW	Alessio Cacciamani	29 June 2007 (age 19)	3	0	(Italian Football Federation) Torino
	FW	**Samuele Inácio**	2 April 2008 (age 18)	2	0	(German Football Association) Borussia Dortmund
	FW	Simone D'Uffizi	15 September 2004 (age 22)	1	0	(Italian Football Federation) Ascoli

=== Recent call-ups ===
Following are listed players called up in the previous twelve months who are still eligible to represent the under-21 team.

Pos.	Player	Date of birth (age)	Caps	Goals	Club	Latest call-up
GK	Lorenzo Torriani	31 January 2005 (age 21)	1	0	(Italy) Milan	v. Albania 8 June 2026
GK	Lapo Siviero	23 November 2006 (age 19)	0	0	(Italy) Torino	v. Albania 8 June 2026
GK	Edoardo Motta	13 January 2005 (age 21)	1	0	(Italy) Lazio	v. North Macedonia 26 March 2026 ^{INJ}
DF	Gabriele Calvani	12 January 2004 (age 22)	2	1	(Italy) Frosinone	v. France 13 November 2026 ^{INJ}
DF	**Honest Ahanor**	23 February 2008 (age 18)	2	0	(England) Crystal Palace	v. Poland 5 October 2026
DF	**Luca Reggiani**	9 January 2008 (age 18)	0	0	(Germany) Borussia Dortmund	v. Poland 5 October 2026
DF	**Niccolò Fortini**	13 February 2006 (age 20)	3	0	(Italy) Torino	v. Armenia 1 October 2026 ^{INJ}
DF	**Costantino Favasuli**	26 April 2004 (age 22)	2	0	(Italy) Napoli	v. Armenia 1 October 2026 ^{INJ}
DF	Gabriele Guarino	14 April 2004 (age 22)	4	0	(Turkey) Samsunspor	v. Albania 8 June 2026
DF	Wisdom Amey	11 August 2005 (age 21)	1	0	(Italy) Frosinone	v. Albania 8 June 2026
DF	Cristian Cama	5 June 2007 (age 19)	1	0	(Italy) Roma Primavera	v. Albania 8 June 2026
DF	Giacomo Stabile	12 April 2005 (age 21)	1	0	(Italy) Südtirol	v. Albania 8 June 2026
DF	Christian Corradi	21 February 2005 (age 21)	0	0	(Italy) Juventus Next Gen	v. Albania 8 June 2026
DF	**Michael Kayode**	10 July 2004 (age 22)	10	0	(England) Brentford	v. Sweden 31 March 2026
MF	**Cher Ndour**	27 July 2004 (age 22)	28	6	(Italy) Fiorentina	v. France 13 November 2026 ^{INJ}
MF	Matteo Cichella	4 October 2005 (age 21)	0	0	(Italy) Frosinone	v. France 13 November 2026 ^{INJ}
MF	**Niccolò Pisilli**	23 September 2004 (age 22)	21	5	(Italy) Roma	v. Poland 5 October 2026
MF	Federico Cassa	1 February 2006 (age 20)	1	0	(Italy) Catanzaro	v. Albania 8 June 2026
MF	Aaron Ciammaglichella	26 January 2005 (age 21)	1	0	(Italy) Pro Vercelli	v. Albania 8 June 2026
MF	Alessandro Di Nunzio	21 April 2007 (age 19)	1	0	(Italy) Roma	v. Albania 8 June 2026
MF	Patrick Nuamah	31 December 2005 (age 20)	1	0	(Spain) Sabadell	v. Albania 8 June 2026
MF	Fabio Rispoli	28 September 2006 (age 20)	1	0	(Italy) Südtirol	v. Albania 8 June 2026
MF	Leonardo Colombo	4 June 2005 (age 21)	0	0	(Italy) Monza	v. Albania 8 June 2026 ^{INJ}
MF	Lorenzo Venturino	22 June 2006 (age 20)	3	0	(Italy) Genoa	v. Sweden 31 March 2026
FW	Dominic Vavassori	9 December 2005 (age 20)	1	0	(Italy) Palermo	v. France 13 November 2026 ^{INJ}
FW	**Luca Koleosho**	15 September 2004 (age 22)	16	5	(France) Paris FC	v. Poland 5 October 2026
FW	**Alphadjo Cisse**	22 October 2006 (age 20)	4	1	(Italy) Milan	v. Poland 5 October 2026
FW	Mattia Liberali	6 April 2007 (age 19)	2	0	(Italy) Como	v. Poland 5 October 2026
FW	Antonio Raimondo	18 March 2004 (age 22)	10	4	(Italy) Frosinone	v. Armenia 1 October 2026 ^{INJ}
FW	**Simone Pafundi**	14 March 2006 (age 20)	5	0	(Italy) Catanzaro	v. Albania 8 June 2026
FW	Gabriele Alesi	28 January 2004 (age 22)	1	0	(Italy) Catanzaro	v. Albania 8 June 2026
FW	Matteo Lavelli	8 December 2006 (age 19)	1	0	(Italy) Inter U23	v. Albania 8 June 2026
FW	Alvin Okoro	26 March 2005 (age 21)	1	0	(Italy) Südtirol	v. Albania 8 June 2026
FW	Emanuele Rao	28 March 2006 (age 20)	1	0	(Italy) Pisa	v. Albania 8 June 2026
^{INJ} Withdrew due to injury^{PRE} Preliminary squad

== Records ==
Players in bold are still eligible to represent the Under-21 team. Caps and goals with the Olympic team are included.

=== Most appearances ===
The following is the top 10 most capped under-21 players:

Rank	Player	Period	Caps	Goals
1	Andrea Pirlo	1998–2002	46	16
2	Marco Motta	2005–2009	42	1
3	Francesco Bardi	2011–2015	37	0
4	Matteo Brighi	2000–2004	35	2
5	Daniele Bonera	2001–2004	34	0
6	Matteo Ferrari	1999–2002	33	3
7	Luca Marrone	2009–2013	32	1
7	Alessandro Rosina	2004–2007	32	4
9	Luca Caldirola	2010–2013	31	1
9	Marco Donadel	2004–2006	31	1

=== Top goalscorers ===
The following is the top 10 under-21 goalscorers:

Rank	Player	Period	Goals	Caps	Ratio
1	Alberto Gilardino	2000–2004	19	30	0.63
2	Andrea Pirlo	1998–2002	16	46	0.34
3	Manolo Gabbiadini	2010–2013	12	24	0.5
4	Massimo Maccarone	2000–2002	11	15	0.73
4	Gianluca Vialli	1983–1986	11	20	0.55
4	Patrick Cutrone	2017–2021	11	25	0.44
7	Cristiano Lucarelli	1996–1997	10	10	1
7	Robert Acquafresca	2007–2009	10	16	0.62
7	Christian Vieri	1992–1996	10	19	0.52
10	Gianluca Scamacca	2018–2021	9	15	0.6
10	Ciro Immobile	2009–2013	9	16	0.56
10	Andrea Belotti	2013–2015	9	18	0.5
10	Roberto Mancini	1982–1986	9	26	0.34
10	Alberto Paloschi	2008–2013	9	29	0.31

== See also ==
- Italy national football team
- Italy national under-20 football team
- UEFA European Under-21 Championship
- Football at the Summer Olympics
