= Georgios Koutsoupias =

Greek footballer

Giorgos Koutsoupias
Personal information
- Full name: Georgios Koutsoupias
- Date of birth: 11 February 1974 (age 52)
- Place of birth: Agrinio, Greece
- Position: Defender

Senior career*
Years	Team	Apps	(Gls)
–1995	Panetolikos		
1995–1999	OFI	68	(2)
1999–2001	Sturm Graz	2	(0)
2001–2002	Aris	0	(0)
2002–2003	Kallithea	16	(0)
2003–2004	Proodeftiki	5	(0)
2004–2005	OFI		
2005–2006	Anagennisi Ierapetra		
2006–2007	OFI		
- * Club domestic league appearances and goals

Georgios Koutsoupias (Greek: Γεώργιος Κουτσουπιάς; born 11 February 1974) is a Greek retired footballer.

== Personal life ==
His son Ilias Koutsoupias is now a professional footballer.
