= Ilario Monterisi =

Italian footballer

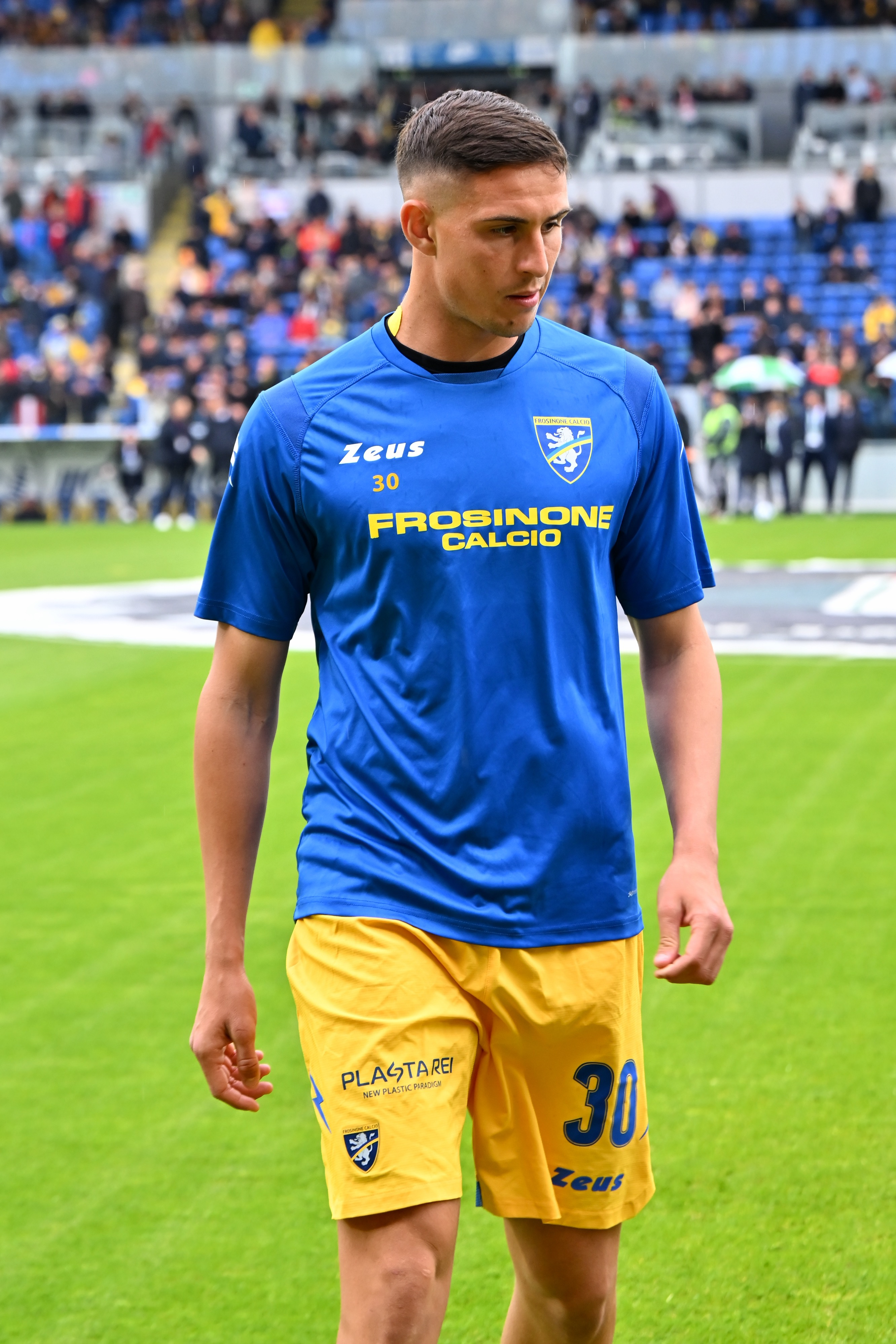

Personal information
- Date of birth: 19 December 2001 (age 24)
- Place of birth: Trani, Italy
- Height: 1.90 m (6 ft 3 in)
- Position: Centre-back

Team information
- Current team: Frosinone
- Number: 30

Youth career
- –2018: Bari
- 2018–2020: Lecce

Senior career*
Years	Team	Apps	(Gls)
2020–2023	Lecce	1	(0)
2021–2022	→ Catanzaro (loan)	0	(0)
2022	→ Fidelis Andria (loan)	18	(1)
2022–2023	→ Frosinone (loan)	11	(1)
2023–	Frosinone	90	(5)
- * Club domestic league appearances and goals as of 16 October 2026

Ilario Monterisi (born 19 December 2001) is an Italian footballer who plays as a centre-back for Serie A club Frosinone.

== Career ==
On 31 August 2021, he joined Catanzaro on a season-long loan. On 17 January 2022, he moved on a new loan to Fidelis Andria.

On 1 July 2022, Monterisi moved on loan to Frosinone.

On 14 July 2023, he returned to Frosinone on permanent basis.

== Career statistics ==
=== Club ===
As of match played 16 October 2026

Appearances and goals by club, season and competition
Club	Season	League			Cup		Other		Total	
Club	Season	Division	Apps	Goals	Apps	Goals	Apps	Goals	Apps	Goals
Lecce	2019–20	Serie A	1	0	0	0	—		1	0
Catanzaro (loan)	2021–22	Serie C	0	0	3	0	—		3	0
Fidelis Andria (loan)	2021–22	Serie C	15	1	1	0	2 (Note: Appearance(s) in Relegation Playoffs)	0	18	1
Frosinone (loan)	2022–23	Serie B	11	0	0	0	—		11	0
Frosinone	2023–24	Serie A	24	2	3	0	—		27	2
Frosinone	2024–25	Serie B	35	1	1	0	—		36	1
Frosinone	2025–26	Serie B	25	2	1	0	—		26	2
Frosinone	2026–27	Serie A	6	0	1	0	—		7	0
Frosinone	Frosinone total		101	5	6	0	—		107	5
Career total			117	6	10	0	2	0	129	6
