= Seydou Fini =

Italian footballer (born 1996)

Personal information
- Date of birth: 2 June 2006 (age 20)
- Place of birth: Bondoukou, Ivory Coast
- Height: 1.78 m (5 ft 10 in)
- Position: Winger

Team information
- Current team: Frosinone (on loan from Genoa)
- Number: 40

Youth career
- 2013–2023: Genoa

Senior career*
Years	Team	Apps	(Gls)
2023–	Genoa	4	(0)
2024	→ Standard Liège (loan)	9	(0)
2024–2025	→ Excelsior (loan)	36	(4)
2026–	→ Frosinone (loan)	8	(1)

International career^{‡}
2023	Italy U17	3	(0)
2023	Italy U18	7	(1)
2024–2025	Italy U19	12	(1)
2024–	Italy U21	14	(5)
2026–	Italy	2	(0)
- * Club domestic league appearances and goals as of 12 May 2026 ‡ National team caps and goals as of 16 November 2026

Seydou Fini (born 2 June 2006) is a professional footballer who plays as a right winger or an attacking midfielder for Serie A club Frosinone, on loan from Genoa. Born in the Ivory Coast, he plays for the Italy national team.

== Club career ==
Fini entered the youth sector of Genoa in 2013, and subsequently came through the club's ranks: in July 2022, he signed his first professional contract with Genoa and started training with the first team, shortly after joining the under-19 squad on a stable basis. During the 2022–23 season, he helped the same formation gain automatic promotion back to the Campionato Primavera 1.

At the start of the 2023–24 season, Fini was promoted to Genoa's first team by manager Alberto Gilardino. On 22 October 2023, he made his professional debut for the club, coming on as a substitute for Stefano Sabelli in the 87th minute of a 2–0 league defeat to Atalanta: in the process, he became the second 2006-born player to make his Serie A debut, only after Simone Pafundi.

On 1 February 2024, Fini was loaned to Belgian Pro League club Standard Liège until the end of the 2023–24 season.

On 22 August of the same year, Fini joined Eerste Divisie side Excelsior on a season-long loan.

On 26 January 2026, Fini was loaned by Frosinone in Serie B.

== International career ==
Born in Ivory Coast, Fini has represented Italy at various youth international levels, having played for the under-17 and under-18 national teams.

In May 2023, he was included in the Italian squad that took part in the UEFA European Under-17 Championship in Hungary, where the Azzurrini got eliminated in the group stage.

On 4 June 2024, two days after his 18th birthday, Fini made his debut for the Italian under-21 national team in the opening game of the 2024 Maurice Revello Tournament, scoring a goal and providing two assists in a 4–3 victory over Japan.

In May 2026, he was one of the players who were called up with the Italy national senior squad by interim head coach Silvio Baldini, for the friendly matches against Luxembourg and Greece on 3 and 7 June 2026, respectively.

== Style of play ==
Fini mainly plays either as a right winger or an attacking midfielder, although he can also cover the centre-forward role. He has been regarded for his strength, his shooting power and his dribbling skills.

== Personal life ==
Born in Bondoukou, Ivory Coast, at the age of six Fini moved to Genoa, Italy, where his father Adam was working as a baker. Previously, it had been mistakenly reported that he was born in Nuoro.

His mother, Ama Siata, lived in Ivory Coast until she moved to Italy in 2025. Fini has two siblings: his younger brother, Gervinho, was named after the eponymous Ivorian footballer, who Fini had walked on the pitch of Marassi Stadium with before a match between Genoa and Roma.

== Career statistics ==
=== Club ===
As of match played 8 May 2026

Appearances and goals by club, season and competition
Club	Season	League			National cup (Note: Includes Coppa Italia, KNVB Cup)		Europe		Total	
Club	Season	Division	Apps	Goals	Apps	Goals	Apps	Goals	Apps	Goals
Genoa	2023–24	Serie A	3	0	1	0	–		4	0
Genoa	2024–25	Serie A	0	0	1	0	–		1	0
Genoa	2025–26	Serie A	1	0	2	0	–		3	0
Genoa	Total		4	0	4	0	0	0	8	0
Standard Liège (loan)	2023–24	Belgian Pro League	9	0	0	0	–		9	0
Excelsior (loan)	2024–25	Eerste Divisie	36	4	2	0	–		38	4
Frosinone (loan)	2025–26	Serie B	8	1	–		–		8	1
Career total			57	5	5	0	0	0	63	5

=== International ===
As of match played 7 June 2026

Appearances and goals by national team and year
National team	Year	Apps	Goals
Italy	2026	2	0
Total		2	0
