= Jérémy Oyono =

Gabonese footballer (born 2001)

Personal information
- Full name: Jérémy Henry Zué Oyono Omva Torque
- Date of birth: 12 April 2001 (age 25)
- Place of birth: Lille, France
- Height: 1.76 m (5 ft 9 in)
- Position: Right-back

Team information
- Current team: Spezia (on loan from Frosinone)
- Number: 31

Youth career
- Valenciennes
- 2017–2021: US Boulogne

Senior career*
Years	Team	Apps	(Gls)
2019–2022	Boulogne II	23	(0)
2021–2024	Boulogne	43	(0)
2024–	Frosinone	36	(1)
2026–	→ Spezia (loan)	4	(0)

International career^{‡}
2023	Gabon U23	3	(0)
2023–	Gabon	18	(1)
- * Club domestic league appearances and goals as of 17 September 2026 ‡ National team caps and goals as of 29 September 2026

Jérémy Henry Zué Oyono Omva Torque (born 12 April 2001) is a professional footballer who plays as a right-back for Serie C Group B club Spezia, on loan from Frosinone. Born in France, he plays for the Gabon national team.

== Club career ==
Oyono is a youth product of Valenciennes and Boulogne. He began his senior career with Boulogne in 2021.

== International career ==
Born in France, Oyono is of Gabonese descent. He was part of the Gabon U23s at the 2023 U-23 Africa Cup of Nations. He debuted with the senior Gabon national team in a 2–1 2026 FIFA World Cup qualification win over Kenya on 16 November 2023, replacing his brother.

== Personal life ==
Oyono's twin brother Anthony Oyono is also a professional footballer.

== Career statistics ==
=== Club ===
As of match played 17 September 2026

Appearances and goals by club, season and competition
Club	Season	League			National cup		Other		Total	
Club	Season	Division	Apps	Goals	Apps	Goals	Apps	Goals	Apps	Goals
Boulogne II	2018–19	CFA 2	1	0	—		—		1	0
Boulogne II	2019–20	CFA 2	1	0	—		—		1	0
Boulogne II	2020–21	CFA 2	21	0	—		—		21	0
Boulogne II	Total		23	0	—		—		23	0
Boulogne	2021–22	Ligue 3	4	0	—		—		4	0
Boulogne	2022–23	CFA	17	0	—		—		17	0
Boulogne	2023–24	CFA	22	0	1	0	—		23	0
Boulogne	Total		43	0	1	0	—		44	0
Frosinone	2024–25	Serie B	23	1	—		—		23	1
Frosinone	2025–26	Serie B	13	0	1	0	—		14	0
Frosinone	Total		36	1	1	0	—		37	1
Spezia	2026–27	Serie C	4	0	0	0	1 (Note: Appearance in Coppa Italia Serie C)	0	5	0
Career total			106	0	2	0	1	0	109	1

=== International ===
As of match played 29 September 2026

Appearances and goals by national team and year
National team	Year	Apps	Goals
Gabon	2023	2	0
Gabon	2024	6	0
Gabon	2025	7	1
Gabon	2026	3	0
Total		18	1

Scores and results list Gabon's goal tally first, score column indicates score after each Oyono goal.

List of international goals scored by Jérémy Oyono
No.	Date	Venue	Opponent	Score	Result	Competition
1	9 June 2025	El Bachir Stadium, Mohammedia, Morocco	Guinea-Bissau	2–0	2–0	Friendly
