= Jacopo Gelli =

Italian footballer

Personal information
- Date of birth: 11 May 2001 (age 25)
- Place of birth: Florence, Italy
- Height: 1.97 m (6 ft 5 1/2 in)
- Position: Centre-back

Team information
- Current team: Cesena (on loan from Frosinone)
- Number: 4

Youth career
- Fiorentina

Senior career*
Years	Team	Apps	(Gls)
2020	Fiorentina	0	(0)
2020	→ Aglianese (loan)	3	(0)
2020–2022	Aglianese	25	(0)
2022	Frosinone	0	(0)
2022	→ AlbinoLeffe (loan)	5	(0)
2022–2024	AlbinoLeffe	20	(0)
2024–2025	Trapani	10	(0)
2025	Messina	12	(0)
2025–	Frosinone	17	(0)
2026–	→ Cesena (loan)	1	(0)
- * Club domestic league appearances and goals as of 23 August 2026

Jacopo Gelli (born 11 May 2001) is an Italian professional footballer who plays as a centre-back for Serie B club Cesena, on loan from Frosinone.

== Club career ==
Gelli is a product of the youth academy of his local club Fiorentina. He joined Serie D club Aglianese on loan in January 2020. In January 2022 he transferred to Frosinone and shortly after on 1 February 2022 joined Serie C club AlbinoLeffe. He played 2 seasons with AlbinoLeffe, before moving to Trapani on 10 January 2024.

On 11 June 2025, Gelli returned to Frosinone in Serie B on a contract until 30 June 2028. He helped Frosinone earn promotion to Serie A at the end of the 2025–26 season.

== Honours ==
Trapani

- Serie D: 2023–24
- Coppa Italia Serie D: 2023–24
