= İsak Vural =

Turkish footballer (born 2006)

Personal information
- Date of birth: 28 May 2006 (age 20)
- Place of birth: Stockholm, Sweden
- Height: 1.83 m (6 ft 0 in)
- Position: Central midfielder

Team information
- Current team: Pisa
- Number: 21

Youth career
- Sant Cugat
- 2013–2017: Hammarby IF
- 2018–2022: Benfica
- 2022–2023: Fenerbahçe
- 2023: → Hammarby IF (loan)

Senior career*
Years	Team	Apps	(Gls)
2023–2024	Hammarby TFF (res.)	19	(3)
2024–2025	Frosinone	23	(0)
2025–	Pisa	15	(0)

International career^{‡}
2022	Turkey U16	3	(1)
2022	Turkey U17	1	(0)
2023	Turkey U18	3	(1)
2024	Turkey U19	9	(2)
2025–	Turkey U21	4	(0)
- * Club domestic league appearances and goals as of 25 May 2026 ‡ National team caps and goals as of 14 November 2025

İsak Vural (born 28 May 2006) is a professional footballer who plays as a central midfielder for Serie B club Pisa. Born in Sweden, he represents Turkey at youth international level.

== Club career ==
=== Early career ===
Vural moved to Spain to start his career with Sant Cugat. In 2013, he returned to his native Sweden to join Hammarby IF, and his performances for their youth teams attracted attention from Spanish giants Barcelona. However, after Barcelona failed to meet the residence and work permit conditions, Vural moved to Portugal to sign for Benfica in 2018.

=== Fenerbahçe ===
On 28 February 2022, after four years in Benfica's youth academy, Vural moved to Turkey to sign for Fenerbahçe. Due to his ability and high potential, he immediately started training with the first team squad, rather than the youth team. On 19 April the same year, Vural made his unofficial debut in a 1–0 friendly win over Ukrainian side Shakhtar Donetsk. In doing so, he became the youngest player to ever represent Fenerbahçe at 15 years, 10 months and 23 days old.

=== Hammarby ===
On 4 February 2023, Vural returned to his boyhood club Hammarby on a one-year loan from Fenerbahçe, being part of their senior squad in Allsvenskan. On 12 April the same year, he moved to Hammarby on a permanent transfer, signing a three-year contract.

=== Frosinone ===
On 1 February 2024, Vural signed with Italian club Frosinone.

On 12 August 2024, he made his Coppa Italia debut against Pisa in a 0–3 home loss. On 18 August 2024, he made his Serie B debut against Sampdoria in a 2–2 home tie.

=== Pisa ===
On 27 June 2025, Vural joined Pisa in Serie A on a four-year contract, with an optional fifth year. On 25 September 2025, he made his debut with the team as a starter in a Coppa Italia 1–0 away loss against Torino.

On 28 September 2025, he made his Serie A debut as a substitute against Fiorentina in a 0–0 home tie. On 5 October 2025, he made his first league start against Bologna in a 4–0 away loss.

== International career ==
Vural is eligible to represent Sweden as his nation of birth, as well as Turkey or Norway through his parents. He has represented Turkey at under-16 level after his transfer to Fenerbahçe.

Some changes were made to the Turkey national football team, which will face Spain in the final match of 2026 FIFA World Cup qualification – UEFA Group E, due to injuries and suspensions, and Vural was included in the Turkey squad for the first time.

== Personal life ==
Born in Stockholm, Sweden, to a Turkish father and Norwegian mother.

== Career statistics ==
=== Club ===
As of matches played 7 November 2025

Appearances and goals by club, season and competition
Club	Season	League			National cup (Note: Includes Svenska Cupen, Turkish Cup, Coppa Italia)		Other		Total	
Club	Season	Division	Apps	Goals	Apps	Goals	Apps	Goals	Apps	Goals
Fenerbahçe	2021–22	Süper Lig	0	0	0	0	8 (Note: Appearance(s) in U19 Elit A Ligi)	1	8	1
Fenerbahçe	2022–23	Süper Lig	0	0	0	0	8	0	8	0
Fenerbahçe	Total		0	0	0	0	16	1	16	1
Hammarby TFF (loan)	2023	Ettan	19	3	0	0	0	0	19	3
Frosinone	2023–24	Serie A	0	0	0	0	8 (Note: Appearance(s) in Campionato Primavera 1)	0	8	0
Frosinone	2024–25	Serie B	23	0	1	0	0	0	24	0
Frosinone	Total		23	0	1	0	8	0	32	0
Pisa	2025–26	Serie A	5	0	1	0	0	0	6	0
Career total			47	3	2	0	24	0	73	3
