= Gabriele Calvani =

Italian footballer

Personal information
- Date of birth: January 12, 2004 (age 22)
- Place of birth: Grottaferrata, Italy
- Height: 1.90 m (6 ft 3 in)
- Position: Centre-back

Team information
- Current team: Frosinone (on loan from Genoa)
- Number: 3

Youth career
- Genoa

Senior career*
Years	Team	Apps	(Gls)
2023–	Genoa	0	(0)
2023–2024	→ Pontedera (loan)	37	(0)
2024–2025	→ Brescia (loan)	20	(1)
2025–	→ Frosinone (loan)	44	(1)

International career^{‡}
2025–	Italy U21	2	(1)
- * Club domestic league appearances and goals as of 10:24, 3 November 2026 (UTC) ‡ National team caps and goals as of 15:51, 26 July 2026 (UTC)

Gabriele Calvani (born 12 January 2004) is an Italian professional footballer who plays as a centre-back for Serie A club Frosinone, on loan from Genoa.

== Club career ==
Calvani captained the Genoa's Primavera side academy, receiving a call-up to the first-team squad.

On 22 July 2023, he joined Serie C club Pontedera on a season-long loan where he made his professional debut.

On 9 August 2024, he joined Brescia on loan in the Serie B for a season.

He followed that up with a loan to Frosinone in Serie B for 2025–26 starting 11 July 2025. Frosinone earned promotion to Serie A for the 2026–27 season, and on 8 July 2026 extended his loan with Frosinone for another season.

== International career ==
Calvani received his first call-up to the Italy national under-21 football team in November 2025 for a set of European Championship qualification matches.

== Personal life ==
Calvani's younger brother, Simone Calvani, is a goalkeeper who also came through Genoa's academy; the pair were on loan together at Frosinone during the 2025–26 season.

== Career statistics ==
=== Club ===
As of match played 1 November 2026

Appearances and goals by club, season and competition
Club	Season	League			National cup		Europe		Total	
Club	Season	Division	Apps	Goals	Apps	Goals	Apps	Goals	Apps	Goals
Pontedera	2023–24	Serie C	37	0	4	0	1	0	42	0
Brescia	2024–25	Serie B	20	1	1	0	—		21	1
Frosinone	2025–26	Serie B	35	1	2	0	—		37	1
Frosinone	2026–27	Serie A	9	0	1	0	—		10	0
Frosinone	Total		44	1	3	0	0	0	47	1
Career total			101	2	8	0	1	0	110	2
