= Anthony Oyono =

Gabonese footballer (born 2001)

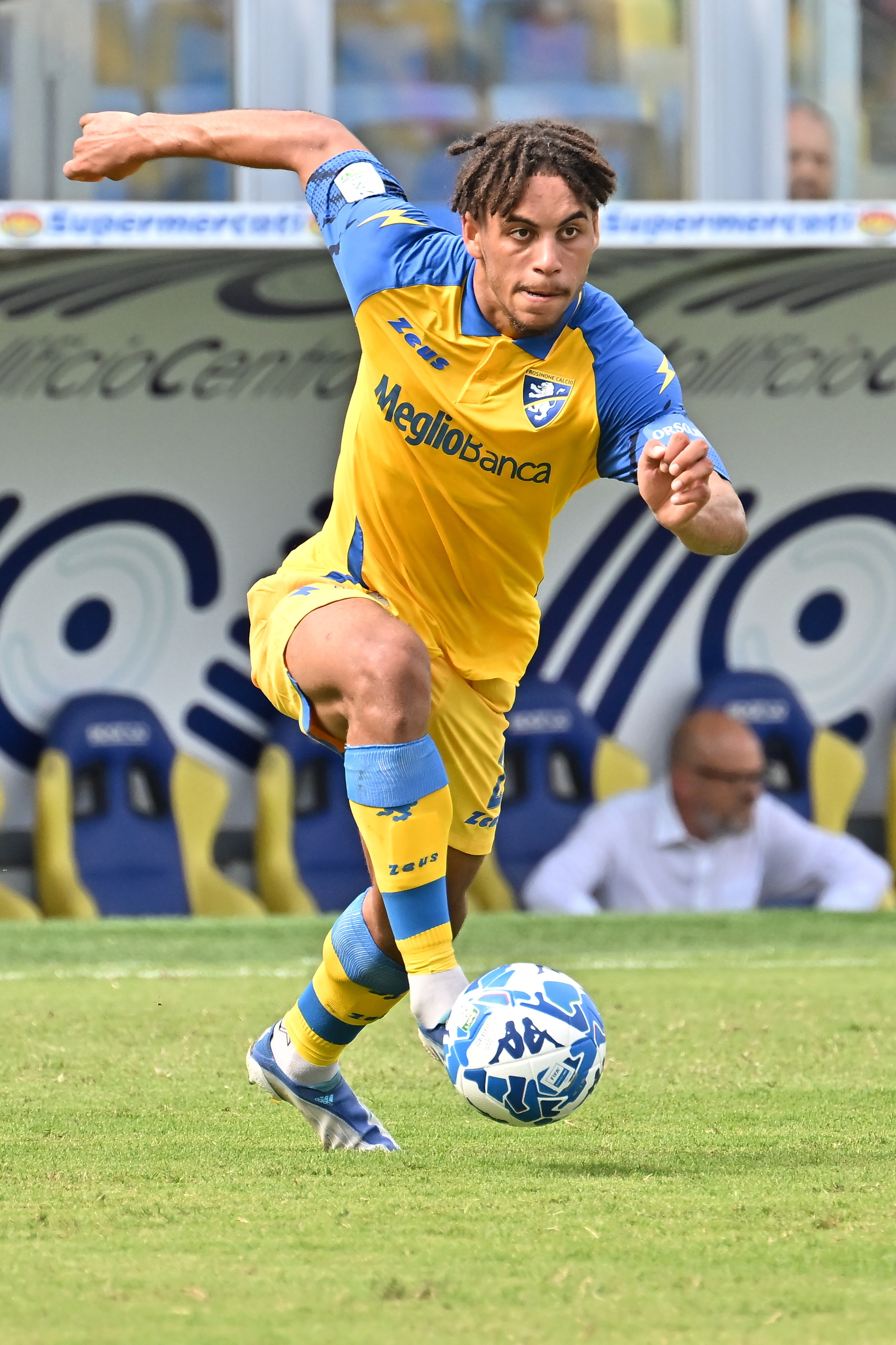

Personal information
- Full name: Anthony Henri Zué Oyono Omva Torque
- Date of birth: 12 April 2001 (age 25)
- Place of birth: Lille, France
- Height: 1.76 m (5 ft 9 in)
- Position: Right-back

Team information
- Current team: Frosinone
- Number: 20

Youth career
- –2020: US Boulogne

Senior career*
Years	Team	Apps	(Gls)
2019–2021	Boulogne B	20	(0)
2020–2022	US Boulogne	31	(0)
2022–	Frosinone	104	(2)

International career^{‡}
2021–	Gabon	32	(0)
- * Club domestic league appearances and goals as of 16 October 2026 ‡ National team caps and goals as of 29 September 2026

Anthony Henri Zué Oyono Omva Torque (born 12 April 2001) is a professional footballer who plays as a right-back for Serie A club Frosinone. Born in France, he represents Gabon at international level.

== Club career ==
Having joined US Boulogne in 2018, Oyono was promoted to the first team in July 2020, making his senior debut for the club on 21 August 2020, starting as a right-back in a 1–0 away win against US Quevilly-Rouen in the Championnat National. In October, he signed a three-year contract extension with the club.

On 30 January 2022, Oyono signed a contract with Italian club Frosinone until 30 June 2024.

== International career ==
Oyono made his international senior debut with Gabon on 30 March 2021, starting as a left-back in a 2–0 win against Angola in the 2021 Africa Cup of Nations qualification.

== Personal life ==
Oyono's twin brother Jérémy Oyono is also a professional footballer.

== Career statistics ==
=== Club ===
As of match played 16 October 2026

Appearances and goals by club, season and competition
Club	Season	League			Cup		Europe		Other		Total	
Club	Season	Division	Apps	Goals	Apps	Goals	Apps	Goals	Apps	Goals	Apps	Goals
Boulogne B	2018–19	National 3	3	0	—		—		—		3	0
Boulogne B	2019–20	National 3	11	0	—		—		—		11	0
Boulogne B	2020–21	National 3	1	0	—		—		—		1	0
Boulogne B	2021–22	National 3	5	0	—		—		—		5	0
Boulogne B	Total		20	0	—		—		—		20	0
US Boulogne	2020–21	Ligue 3	23	0	6	0	—		—		29	0
US Boulogne	2021–22	Ligue 3	8	0	0	0	—		—		8	0
US Boulogne	Total		31	0	6	0	—		—		37	0
Frosinone	2021–22	Serie B	2	0	0	0	—		—		2	0
Frosinone	2022–23	Serie B	13	0	1	0	—		—		14	0
Frosinone	2023–24	Serie B	16	0	2	0	—		—		18	0
Frosinone	2024–25	Serie B	32	1	0	0	—		—		32	1
Frosinone	2025–26	Serie B	34	1	1	0	—		—		35	1
Frosinone	2026–27	Serie A	7	0	1	0	—		—		8	0
Frosinone	Total		104	2	5	0	—		—		109	2
Career total			155	2	11	0	0	0	0	0	166	2

=== International ===
As of match played 29 September 2026

Appearances and goals by national team and year
National team	Year	Apps	Goals
Gabon	2021	5	0
Gabon	2022	5	0
Gabon	2023	6	0
Gabon	2024	6	0
Gabon	2025	8	0
Gabon	2026	2	0
Total		32	0
