= Giorgi Kvernadze =

Georgian footballer (born 2003)

Personal information
- Date of birth: 7 February 2003 (age 23)
- Place of birth: Samtredia, Georgia
- Height: 1.83 m (6 ft 0 in)
- Position: Winger

Team information
- Current team: Frosinone
- Number: 17

Youth career
- 2012–2020: Saburtalo

Senior career*
Years	Team	Apps	(Gls)
2021–2022	Saburtalo	8	(0)
2022	→ Telavi	21	(3)
2023–2024	Kolkheti 1913	0	(0)
2023	→ Dinamo Batumi (loan)	7	(0)
2023–2024	→ Frosinone (loan)	5	(0)
2024–	Frosinone	79	(11)

International career^{‡}
2020	Georgia U17	2	(0)
2021–2022	Georgia U19	10	(1)
2022–	Georgia U21	18	(2)
2025–	Georgia	11	(0)
- * Club domestic league appearances and goals as of 15:11, 3 November 2026 (UTC) ‡ National team caps and goals as of 15:45, 18 November 2026 (UTC)

Giorgi Kvernadze (Georgian: გიორგი კვერნაძე; born 7 February 2003) is a Georgian professional footballer who plays as a left winger for Serie A club Frosinone and the Georgia national team.

== Club career ==
Kvernadze entered Saburtalo's academy at the age of nine: having come through the club's youth ranks, he played for the reserve team, in the national third tier, before making his first-team debut in the Erovnuli Liga at the age of 18.

On 26 February 2022, Kvernadze joined Telavi on a loan for the rest of the 2022 season. On 5 March 2022, he scored his first professional goal, in a 2–0 league win over Sioni Bolnisi. Throughout the campaign, Kvernadze helped the team preserve their place in the top tier, having scored three goals.

Shortly before the beginning of the 2023 season, Kvernadze signed for newly promoted Liga 2 side Kolkheti Poti, before subsequently joining Dinamo Batumi on loan.

On 3 July 2023, Kvernadze officially joined Serie A side Frosinone on a season-long loan, with an option to buy. He made his official debut for the club on 11 August, coming on as a substitute for Giuseppe Caso in the second half of a 1–0 Coppa Italia win over Pisa. One week later, he also made his Serie A debut, coming on for Caso in the 67th minute of a 3–1 league defeat to Napoli. Overall, he featured in five league matches for the team, who fought hard to avoid relegation.

On 2 July 2024, Frosinone announced the signing of a new four-year deal for Kvernadze. He scored eight goals in Serie B in next two seasons and helped his team to gain promotion following the 2025–26 Serie B season.

On 6 September 2026, Kvernadze opened his goal-scoring account in Serie A as Frosinone snatched a late 3–2 win over Venezia. His blistering start to the season with five goals and two assists in six appearances resulted in his first nomination for Sofascore Team of the Serie A Week and Easports Serie A Player of the Month.

== International career ==
After taking part in ten matches for U19s, Kvernadze became a regular player for the U21 team. He played in all ten games of Georgia's 2025 UEFA Championship qualifying campaign in addition to both play-offs against Croatia, in which his team prevailed on penalties. Kvernadze scored in a 2–0 away win against Gibraltar on 26 March 2024, followed by another goal in a 3–0 home victory over Moldova on 5 September.

In 2025, Kvernadze received a call-up to the senior team. He made a debut as a second-half substitute in a 4–0 home loss to Spain on 15 November 2025.

== Career statistics ==
As of match played 1 November 2026

Appearances and goals by club, season and competition
Club	Season	League			National cup (Note: Includes Georgian Cup, Coppa Italia)		Total	
Club	Season	Division	Apps	Goals	Apps	Goals	Apps	Goals
Saburtalo B	2021	Liga 3	—		1	0	1	0
Saburtalo	2021	Erovnuli Liga	8	0	2	0	10	0
Telavi (loan)	2022	Erovnuli Liga	21	3	2	1	23	4
Dinamo Batumi (loan)	2023	Erovnuli Liga	7	0	—		7	0
Frosinone (loan)	2023–24	Serie A	5	0	3	0	8	0
Frosinone	2024–25	Serie B	33	3	1	0	34	3
Frosinone	2025–26	Serie B	36	5	2	1	38	6
Frosinone	2026–27	Serie A	10	3	1	2	11	5
Frosinone	Total		84	11	7	3	91	14
Career total			115	14	12	4	127	18

== Honours ==
Saburtalo

- Georgian Cup: 2021
