= Lorenzo Palmisani =

Italian footballer (born 2004)

Personal information
- Date of birth: 12 June 2004 (age 22)
- Place of birth: Alatri, Italy
- Height: 1.97 m (6 ft 6 in)
- Position: Goalkeeper

Team information
- Current team: Frosinone
- Number: 22

Youth career
- Mole Bisleti
- 2013–2023: Frosinone

Senior career*
Years	Team	Apps	(Gls)
2023–	Frosinone	49	(0)
2023–2024	→ Olbia (loan)	0	(0)
2024–2025	→ Lucchese (loan)	19	(0)

International career^{‡}
2023	Italy U19	2	(0)
2023–2024	Italy U20	5	(0)
2025–	Italy U21	9	(0)
Medal record
Men's football
Representing Italy
UEFA European Under-19 Championship
Winner	2023 Malta
- * Club domestic league appearances and goals as of 21:00, 7 November 2026 (UTC) ‡ National team caps and goals as of 13 November 2026

Lorenzo Palmisani (born 12 June 2004) is an Italian professional footballer who plays as a goalkeeper for Serie A club Frosinone.

== Club career ==
A youth product of Mole Bisleti, Palmisani joined the academy of Frosinone in 2013. On 29 August 2023, he joined Olbia on a year-long loan in the Serie C. On On 3 January 2024, Frosinone recalled him early from his loan. 1 August 2024, was again loaned out Lucchese on a season-long loan in the Serie C. In January 2025, he was again recalled early by Frosinone from his loan. On 10 November 2025, he extended his contract with Frosinone until 2029 after being promoted as their primary goalkeeper.

== International career ==
Palmisani was called up to the Italy U19s for the 2023 UEFA European Under-19 Championship. He was called up to the Italy U21s for a set of 2027 UEFA European Under-21 Championship qualification matches in November 2025.

In May 2026, he was one of the players who were called up with the Italy national senior squad by interim head coach Silvio Baldini, for the friendly matches against Luxembourg and Greece on 3 and 7 June 2026, respectively.

== Career statistics ==
As of match played 7 November 2026

Appearances and goals by club, season and competition
Club	Season	League			Coppa Italia		Other		Total	
Club	Season	Division	Apps	Goals	Apps	Goals	Apps	Goals	Apps	Goals
Frosinone	2021–22	Serie B	0	0	0	0	—		0	0
Frosinone	2022–23	Serie A	0	0	0	0	—		0	0
Frosinone	2023–24	Serie A	0	0	0	0	—		0	0
Frosinone	2025–26	Serie B	38	0	1	0	—		39	0
Frosinone	2026–27	Serie A	11	0	1	0	—		6	0
Frosinone	Total		49	0	2	0	—		51	0
Olbia (loan)	2023–24	Serie C	0	0	—		1	0	1	0
Lucchese (loan)	2024–25	Serie C	19	0	—		1	0	20	0
Career total			68	0	2	0	2	0	72	0

== Honours ==
Italy U19

- UEFA European Under-19 Championship: 2023
