= Giacomo Calò =

Italian footballer

Personal information
- Date of birth: 5 February 1997 (age 29)
- Place of birth: Trieste, Italy
- Height: 1.80 m (5 ft 11 in)
- Position: Midfielder

Team information
- Current team: Frosinone
- Number: 14

Youth career
- –2012: Triestina
- 2012–2014: Sampdoria

Senior career*
Years	Team	Apps	(Gls)
2014–2017	Sampdoria	0	(0)
2016–2017	→ Pontedera (loan)	30	(1)
2017–2019	Juve Stabia	53	(4)
2019–2023	Genoa	0	(0)
2019–2020	→ Juve Stabia (loan)	33	(4)
2020–2021	→ Pordenone (loan)	27	(0)
2021–2022	→ Benevento (loan)	31	(0)
2022–2023	→ Cosenza (loan)	24	(0)
2023–2024	Cosenza	32	(1)
2024–2026	Cesena	34	(2)
2025–2026	→ Frosinone (loan)	37	(10)
2026–	Frosinone	10	(5)
- * Club domestic league appearances and goals as of 17:18, 1 November 2026 (UTC)

Giacomo Calò (born 5 February 1997) is an Italian professional footballer who plays as a midfielder for Serie A club Frosinone.

== Club career ==
Calò was born in Trieste in the Friuli-Venezia Giulia region of Italy, and began his career in the youth sides of local team Triestina. When they experienced financial difficulties in 2012, Calò was released by the club and became a free-agent. He then moved to Genoa and attended the Istituto Socio Economico a Genova, and was soon signed by Sampdoria. Heralded as a 'new Andrea Pirlo', he rejected interest from other Serie A clubs Juventus, Udinese, Fiorentina and Atalanta, in order to play in the Blucerchiati youth teams. After his promotion in 2014, he gradually became an important player for the Primavera side, eventually making over fifty appearances and scoring ten goals.

=== Loan moves ===
After two years in the Primavera side, Sampdoria decided to loan Calò out in order for him to gain professional match experience. On 6 July 2016, he moved to Pontedera in Lega Pro. His debut for the Granata came in a 1–3 Coppa Italia loss to Foggia on 31 July 2016. Despite beginning the season playing sporadically, he eventually became a more regular feature in the centre of midfield, and scored his first goal for the club on 23 December 2016 in an eventual 1–2 loss to Siena.

=== Genoa ===
On 25 July 2019, he moved to Genoa and was loaned back to Juve Stabia for the 2019–20 season.

==== Loan to Pordenone ====
On 16 September 2020, he joined Serie B side Pordenone on loan.

==== Loan to Benevento ====
On 14 July 2021, he joined Benevento on loan with an option to buy.

=== Cosenza ===
On 26 August 2022, Calò joined Cosenza on loan with an obligation to buy.

=== Cesena ===
On 11 July 2024, Calò signed a three-year contract with Cesena.

On 7 August 2025, he moved on loan to Frosinone, with an option to buy.
