= Eldin Lolić =

Bosnian footballer

Personal information
- Full name: Eldin Lolić
- Date of birth: May 15, 2004 (age 22)
- Place of birth: Lyon, France
- Height: 1.85 m (6 ft 1 in)
- Position: Goalkeeper

Team information
- Current team: Frosinone

Youth career
- 2013–2017: Saint-Priest
- 2017–2021: Saint-Étienne
- 2021–2023: Cagliari

Senior career*
Years	Team	Apps	(Gls)
2023–2024	Tuzla City	15	(0)
2024–2025	Sloboda Tuzla	17	(0)
2025–	Frosinone	0	(0)

International career^{‡}
2020	Bosnia and Herzegovina U17	1	(0)
2025–	Bosnia and Herzegovina U21	1	(0)
- * Club domestic league appearances and goals as of 19:59, 26 July 2026 (UTC) ‡ National team caps and goals as of 19:59, 26 July 2026 (UTC)

Eldin Lolić (born 15 May 2004) is a professional footballer who plays as a goalkeeper for Serie A club Frosinone. Born in France, he is a youth international for Bosnia and Herzegovina.

== Club career ==
Lolić is a product of the youth academies of the French clubs Saint-Priest and Saint-Étienne, before moving to Italy on 25 August 2021 to finish his development. On 16 July 2023, he transferred to the Premier League of Bosnia and Herzegovina club Tuzla City where he began his senior career. He moved to Sloboda Tuzla on 17 October 2024.

On 25 July 2025, Lolić signed with Serie B club Frosinone.

== International career ==
Born in France, Lolić is of Bosnian descent. He was called up to the Bosnia and Herzegovina U21s for a set of friendlies in March 2025.
