= Massimo Zilli =

Italian footballer (born 2002)

Personal information
- Date of birth: 17 July 2002 (age 24)
- Place of birth: Udine, Italy
- Height: 1.94 m (6 ft 4 in)
- Position: Forward

Team information
- Current team: Spezia

Youth career
- –2017: Pordenone
- 2017–2020: Lazio
- 2020–2022: Cosenza

Senior career*
Years	Team	Apps	(Gls)
2022–2026	Cosenza	66	(5)
2024	→ SPAL (loan)	16	(4)
2025–2026	→ Frosinone (loan)	34	(2)
2026–	Spezia	0	(0)
- * Club domestic league appearances and goals as of 29 August 2026

Massimo Zilli (born 17 July 2002) is an Italian footballer who plays as a forward for Serie C Group B club Spezia.

== Club career ==
He made his Serie B debut for Cosenza on 10 April 2022 in a game against Monza.

On 18 January 2024 he joined Serie C side SPAL on loan.

On 13 August 2025, Zilli moved to Frosinone on loan with an option to buy.
