= Giuseppe Barcella =

Italian philatelist (1926–1992)

Giuseppe Barcella (13 June 1926 - 8 February 1992) was an Italian philatelist who signed the Roll of Distinguished Philatelists in 1990.
