= Kevin Barcella =

Italian footballer

Personal information
- Date of birth: June 17, 2006 (age 20)
- Place of birth: Seriate, Italy
- Height: 1.77 m (5 ft 9 1/2 in)
- Position: Attacking midfielder

Team information
- Current team: Crotone (on loan from Frosinone)
- Number: 37

Youth career
- AlbinoLeffe

Senior career*
Years	Team	Apps	(Gls)
2024	AlbinoLeffe	0	(0)
2024	→ Paradiso (loan)	13	(0)
2024–2025	Paradiso	0	(0)
2024–2025	→ Frosinone (loan)	9	(0)
2025–	Frosinone	4	(0)
2026–	→ Crotone (loan)	5	(0)
- * Club domestic league appearances and goals as of 26 September 2026

Kevin Barcella (born 17 June 2006) is an Italian professional footballer who plays as an attacking midfielder for Serie C Group C club Crotone, on loan from Frosinone.

== Club career ==
Barcella is a product of the youth product of AlbinoLeffe, before moving to the Swiss Promotion League club Paradiso in January 2024. He joined Frosinone on a season-long loan in Serie B. On 12 June 2025, Frosinone triggered the buy option on his contract, signing him until 2029.
