= Alessandro Selvini =

Italian footballer (born 2004)

Personal information
- Date of birth: 24 March 2004 (age 22)
- Place of birth: Frosinone, Italy
- Height: 1.80 m (5 ft 11 in)
- Position: Forward

Team information
- Current team: Pineto

Youth career
- Frosinone

Senior career*
Years	Team	Apps	(Gls)
2022–2026	Frosinone	2	(0)
2023	→ Rimini (loan)	10	(0)
2024–2025	→ Lucchese (loan)	31	(7)
2026	→ Forlì (loan)	13	(0)
2026–	Pineto	0	(0)
- * Club domestic league appearances and goals as of 30 April 2026

Alessandro Selvini (born 24 March 2004) is an Italian professional football player who plays as a forward for Serie C Group B club Pineto.

== Club career ==
He made his Serie B debut for Frosinone on 5 April 2022 in a game against Pordenone.

On 12 August 2023, Selvini joined Rimini on a season-long loan.

== Honours ==
Campionato Primavera 2021–22
