= Francesco Gelli =

Italian footballer

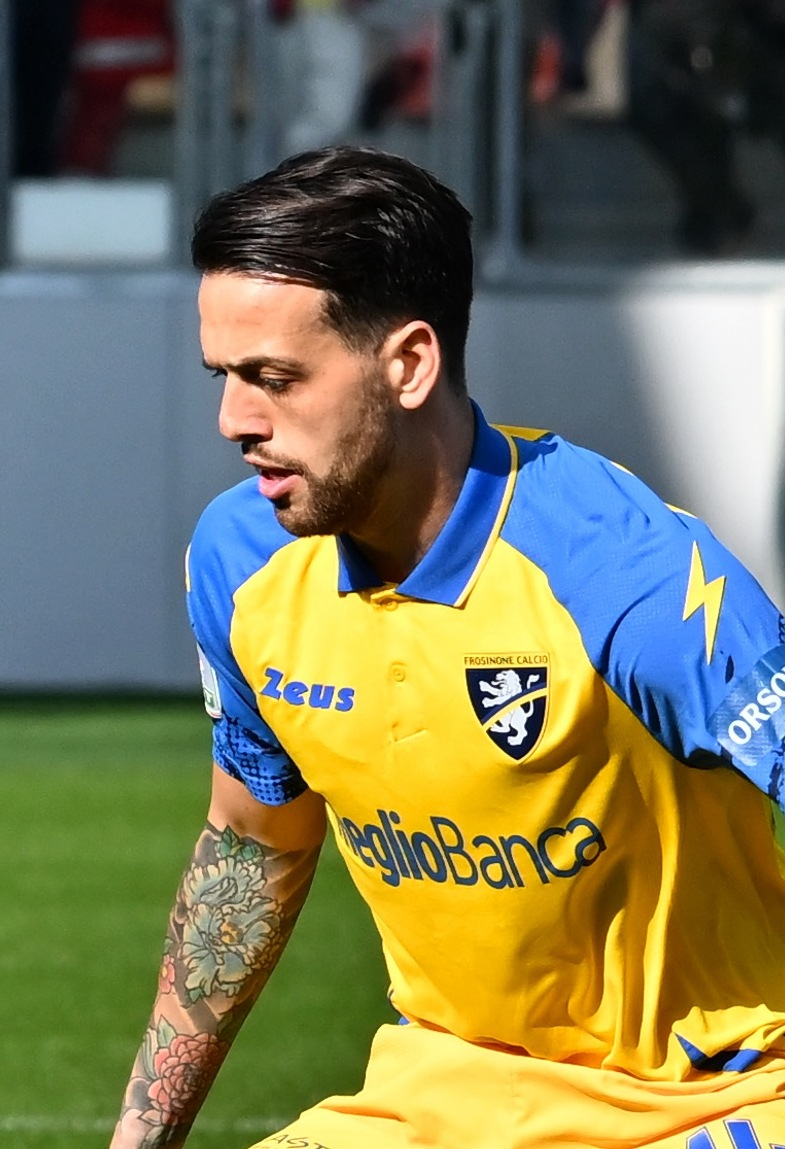
- Gelli in 2023

Personal information
- Date of birth: 15 October 1996 (age 30)
- Place of birth: Livorno, Italy
- Height: 1.75 m (5 ft 9 in)
- Position: Central midfielder

Team information
- Current team: Frosinone
- Number: 96

Youth career
- –2013: Livorno

Senior career*
Years	Team	Apps	(Gls)
2013–2015	Livorno	0	(0)
2013–2015	→ Tuttocuoio (loan)	9	(1)
2015–2016	Valdinievole Montecatini	26	(3)
2016–2017	Tuttocuoio	23	(2)
2017–2023	AlbinoLeffe	127	(8)
2023–	Frosinone	79	(1)
2025	→ Cremonese (loan)	6	(0)
- * Club domestic league appearances and goals as of 12 May 2026

Francesco Gelli (born 15 October 1996) is an Italian professional footballer who plays as a central midfielder for Serie A club Frosinone.

== Career ==
In July 2017, Gelli moved to Serie C club AlbinoLeffe on a free transfer.

On 31 January 2023, Gelli signed a 1.5-year contract with Frosinone in Serie B.
