= Sergio Kalaj =

Albanian footballer

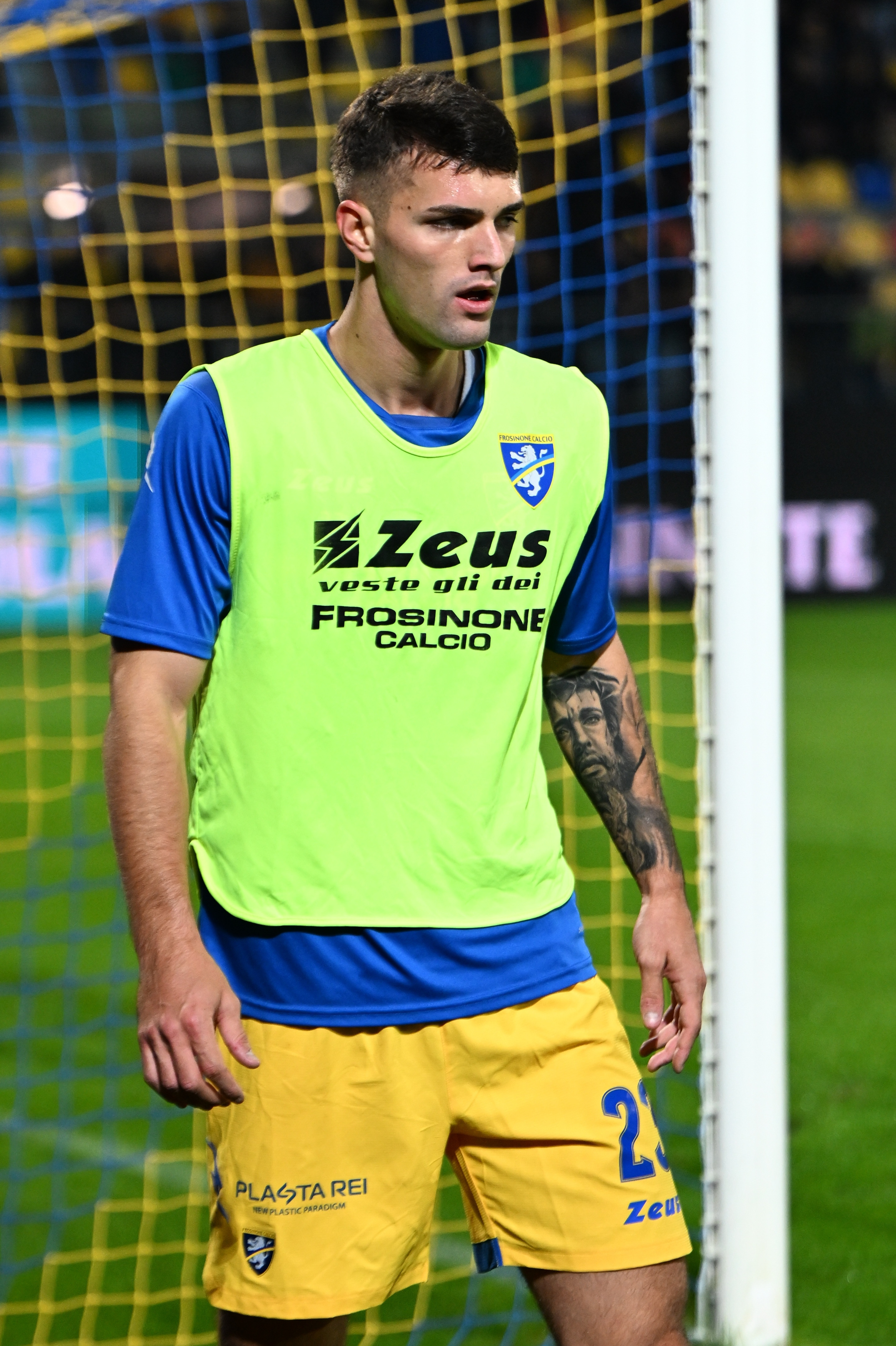
- Kalaj in 2022 with Frosinone

Personal information
- Date of birth: 28 January 2000 (age 26)
- Place of birth: Marino, Italy
- Height: 1.93 m (6 ft 4 in)
- Position: Centre-back

Team information
- Current team: Spezia
- Number: 23

Youth career
- Città di Marino
- –2017: Savio
- 2016–2017: → Roma (loan)
- 2017–2020: Lazio

Senior career*
Years	Team	Apps	(Gls)
2019–2021	Lazio	0	(0)
2020–2021	→ Grosseto (loan)	23	(0)
2021–2022	Carrarese	17	(0)
2022–2026	Frosinone	15	(0)
2026–	Spezia	0	(0)

International career^{‡}
2016	Albania U17	2	(0)
2017	Albania U18	3	(0)
2018	Albania U19	2	(0)
2019–2022	Albania U21	7	(0)
- * Club domestic league appearances and goals as of 23 August 2026 ‡ National team caps and goals as of 13 June 2022

Sergio Kalaj (born 28 January 2000) is a professional footballer who plays as a centre-back for Serie C Group B club Spezia. Born in Italy, he represents Albania internationally.

== Club career ==
On 12 September 2020, he joined Serie C club Grosseto on loan.

On 22 July 2021, he joined Carrarese on a permanent basis.

On 13 January 2022, he signed a 4.5-year contract with Frosinone in Serie B.
