= Stadio Benito Stirpe =

Football stadium in Frosinone, Italy

Coordinates: 41°38′03″N 13°19′19″E

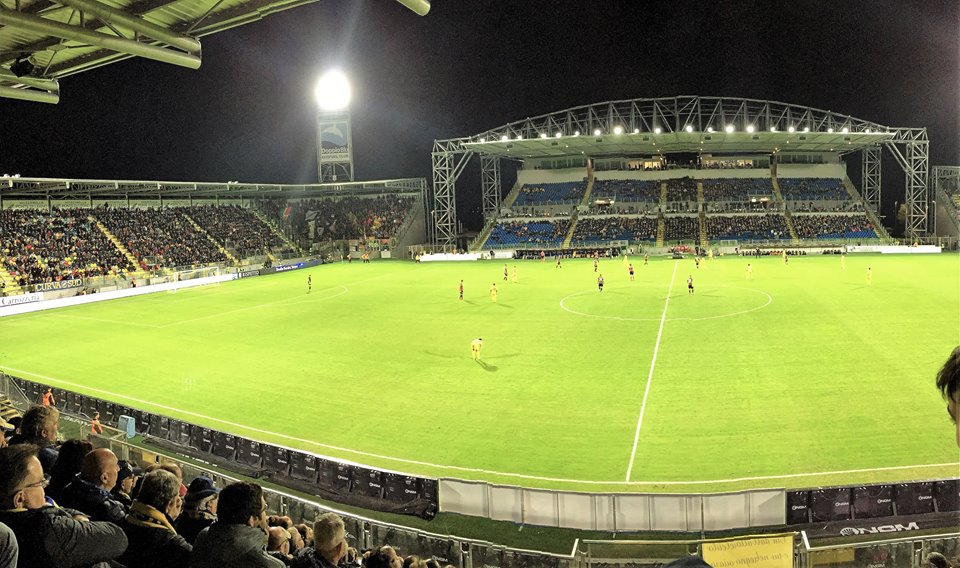
- Stadio Benito Stirpe
- Interactive map of Stadio Benito Stirpe
- Location: Viale Olimpia, Frosinone, Italy
- Owner: Frosinone Calcio
- Capacity: 16,227 seated
- Surface: Grass; 105x68m

Construction
- Groundbreaking: 1974
- Opened: 2017
- Cost: €20 million

Tenant
- Frosinone Calcio (2017–)

The Stadio Benito Stirpe, also known as Stadio Casaleno and officially named PSC Arena, is an all-seater football stadium in the Italian city of Frosinone, Lazio.

Designed in the mid-1970s and built in the second half of the 1980s, the stadium remained unfinished for about thirty years. The stadium was completed between 2015 and 2017 on the initiative of local football team Frosinone Calcio, who won a lease for the stadium from the local council for 90 years, in order to replace the old municipal stadium.

With a capacity of 16,227, it is the largest stadium found in the province, and the third in Lazio.

It is dedicated to the memory of Benito Stirpe, entrepreneur and chairman of Frosinone Calcio in the 1960s, and father of Maurizio Stirpe, his successor at the helm of the club.

The total cost of the stadium was approximately €20 million, of which approximately €15 million went to the 2015–2017 construction completion.

== Structures and facilities ==
The Benito Stirpe Stadium comprises 16,227 seats split between five stands: the 'Main Stand', the 'North Stand', the 'East Stand', the 'South Stand' and the 'Away End' (which is the south-west corner).

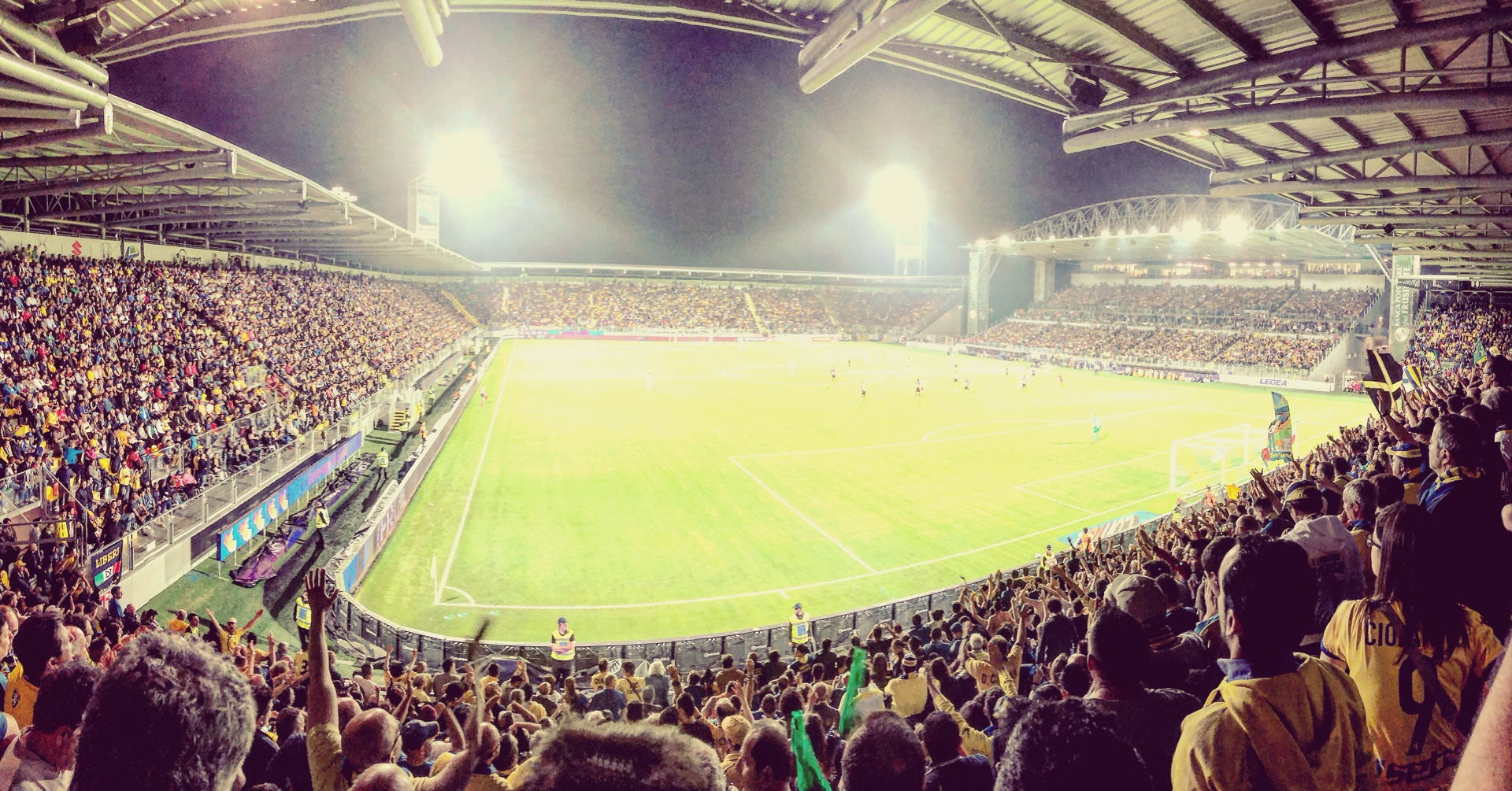
The stadium

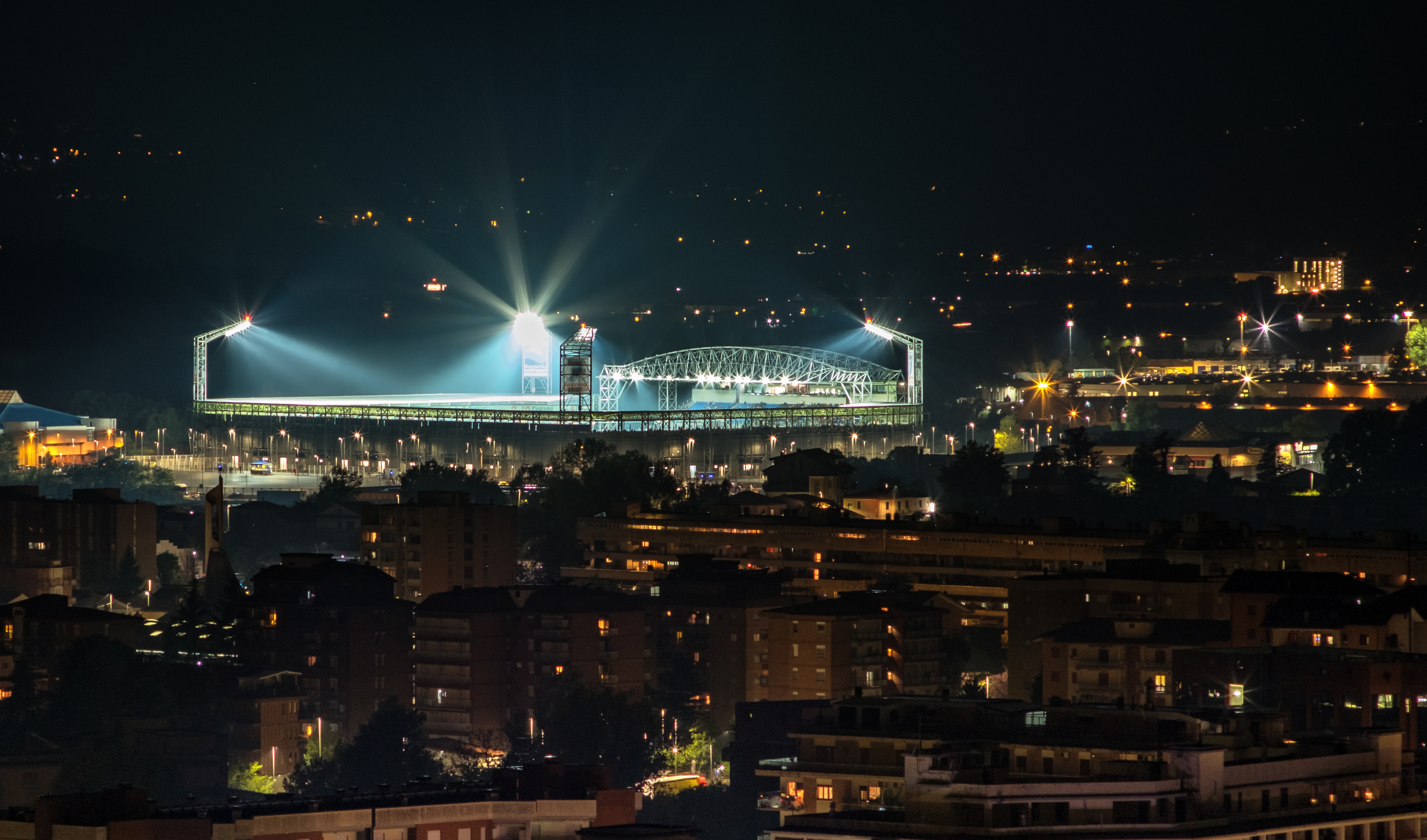
The stadium

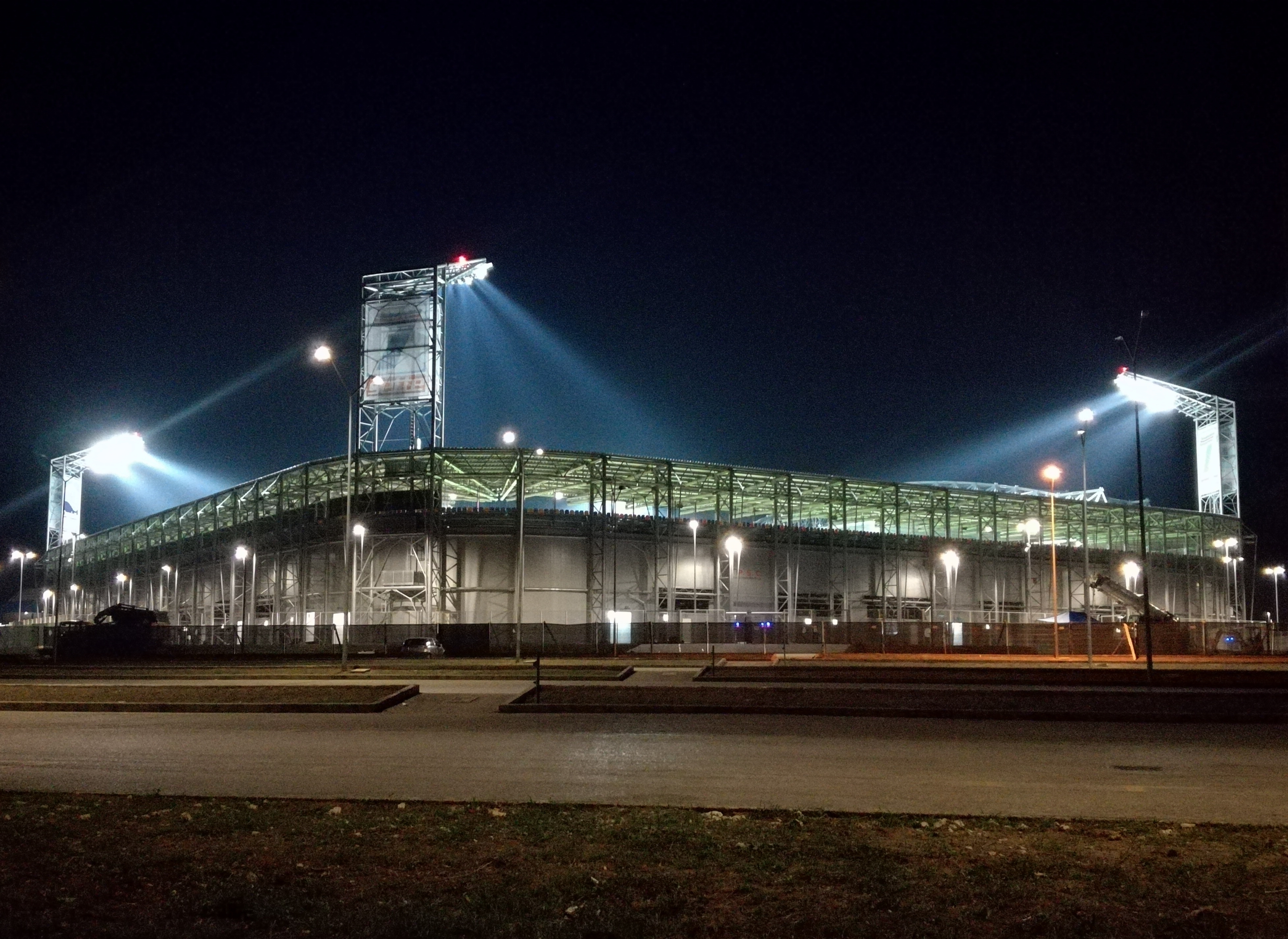
The stadium

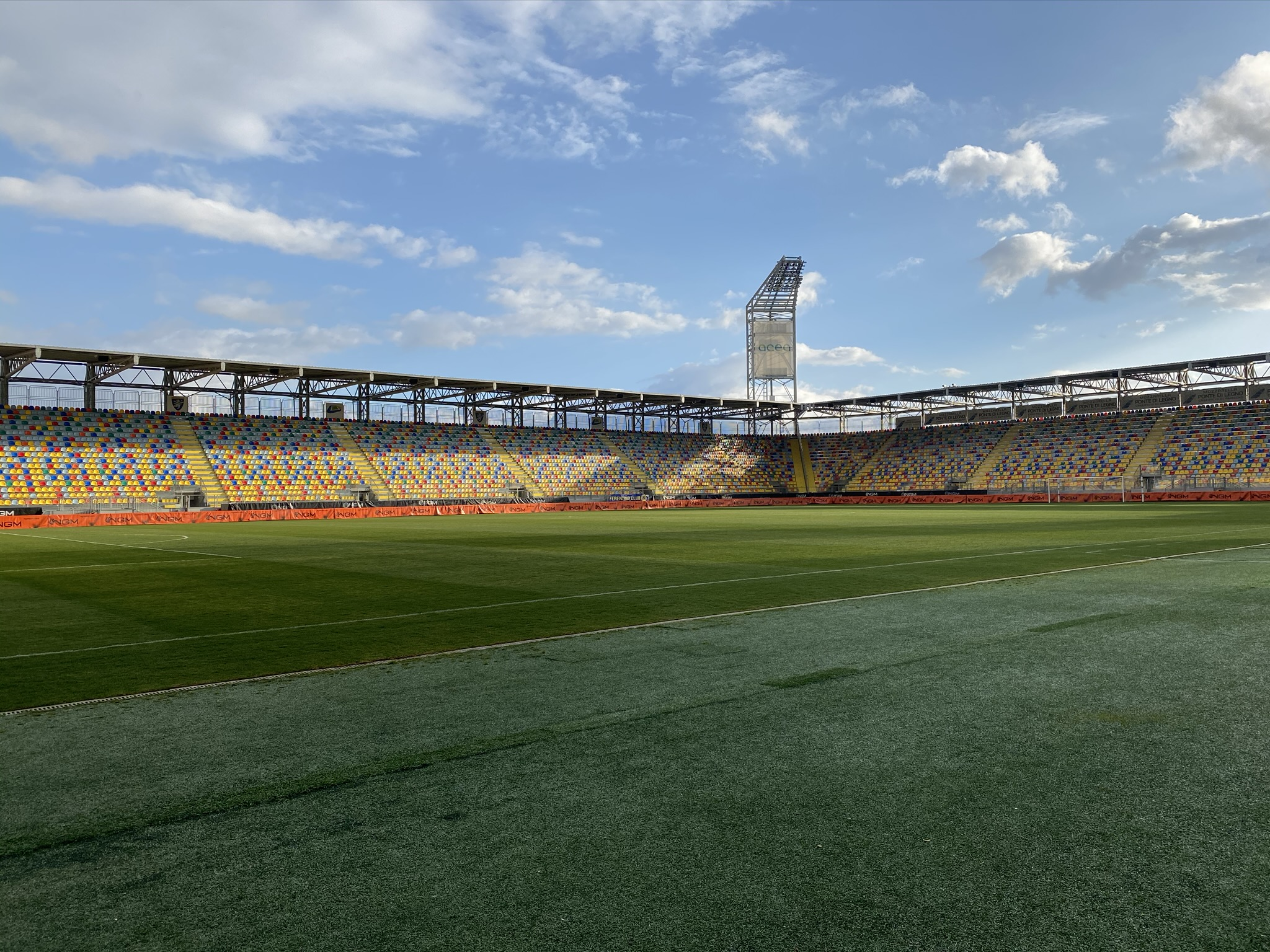
The Stadio Benito Stirpe in 2020

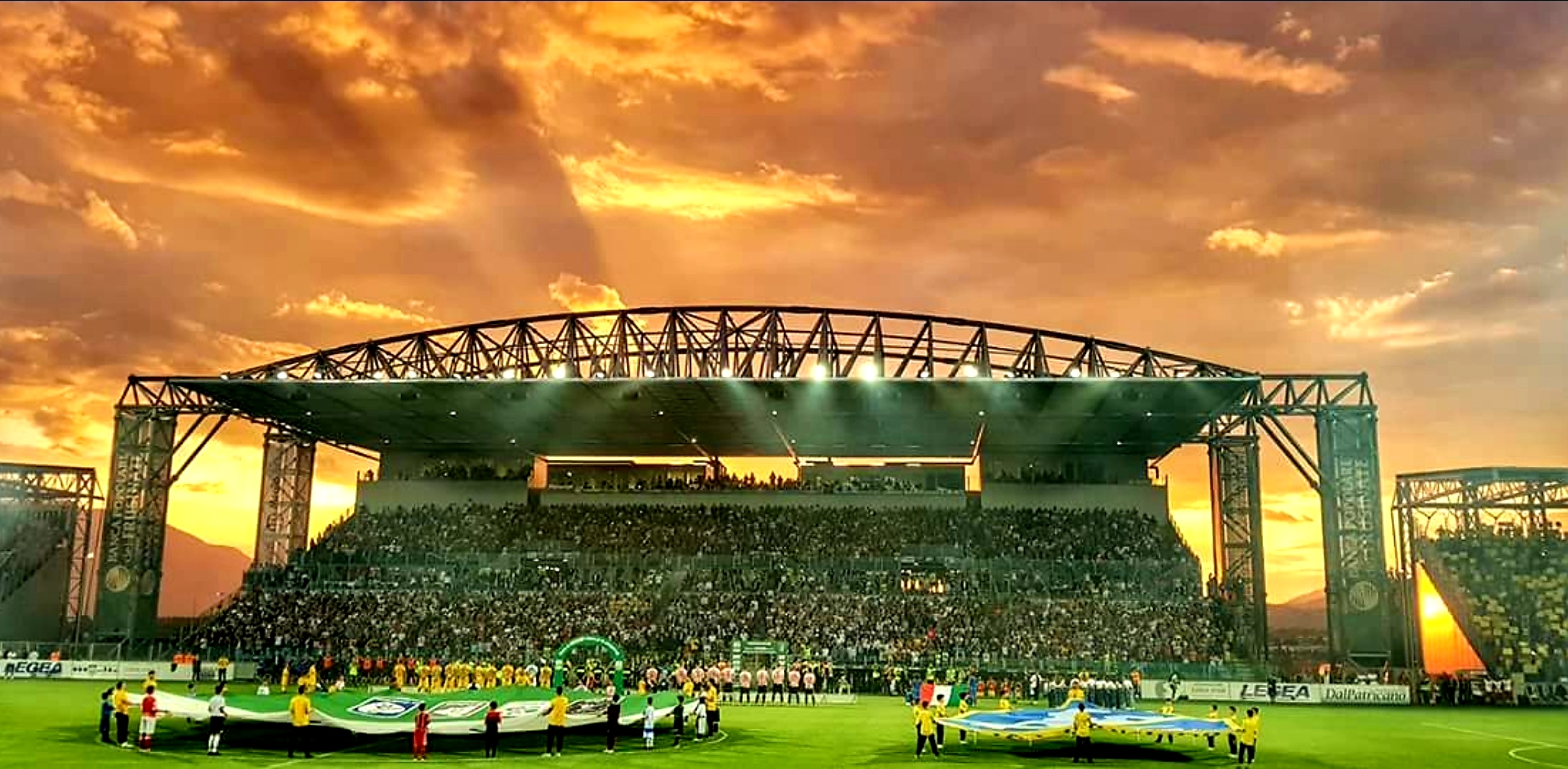
The Main Stand (June 2018)

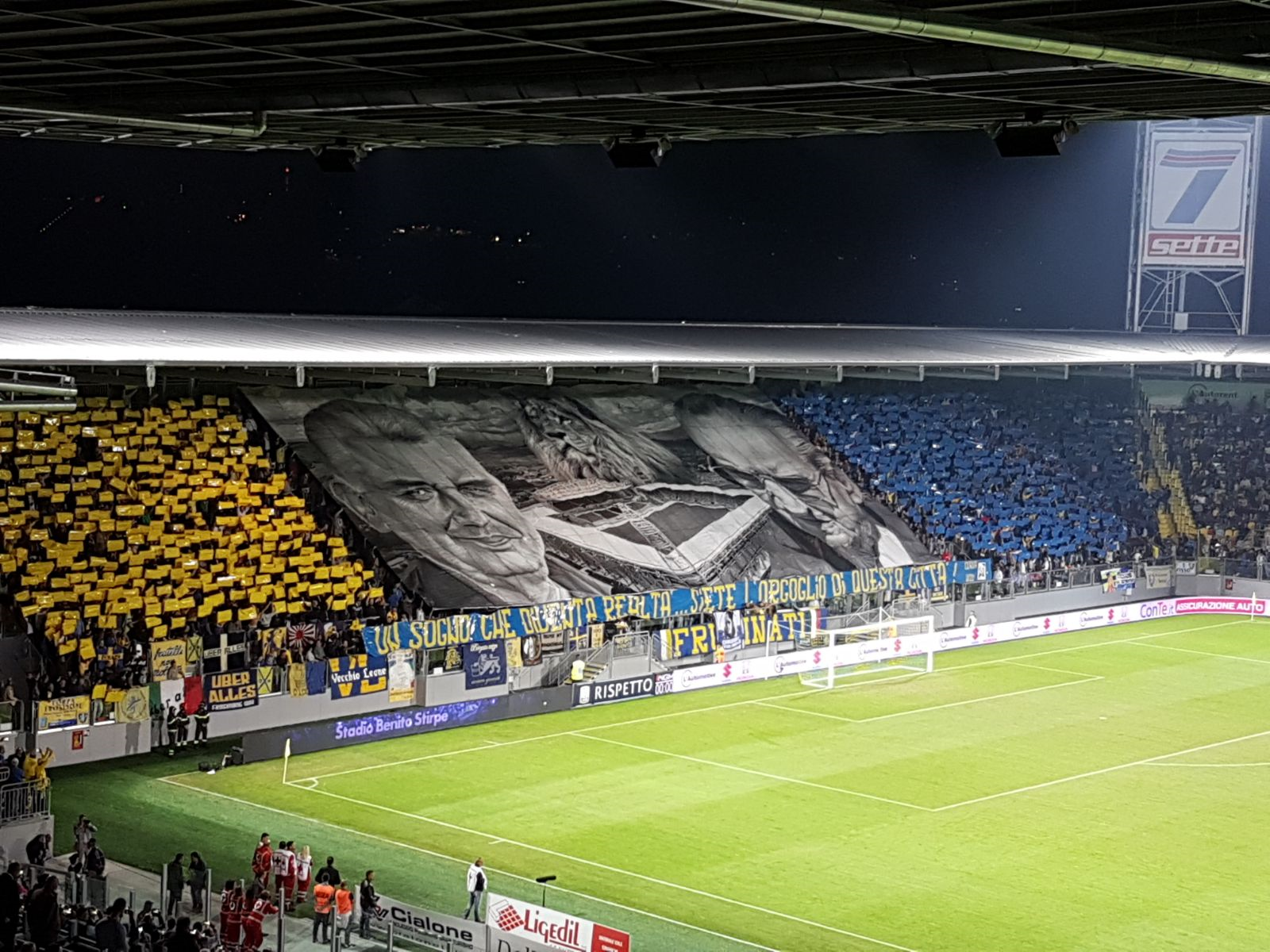
The North Stand (October 2017)

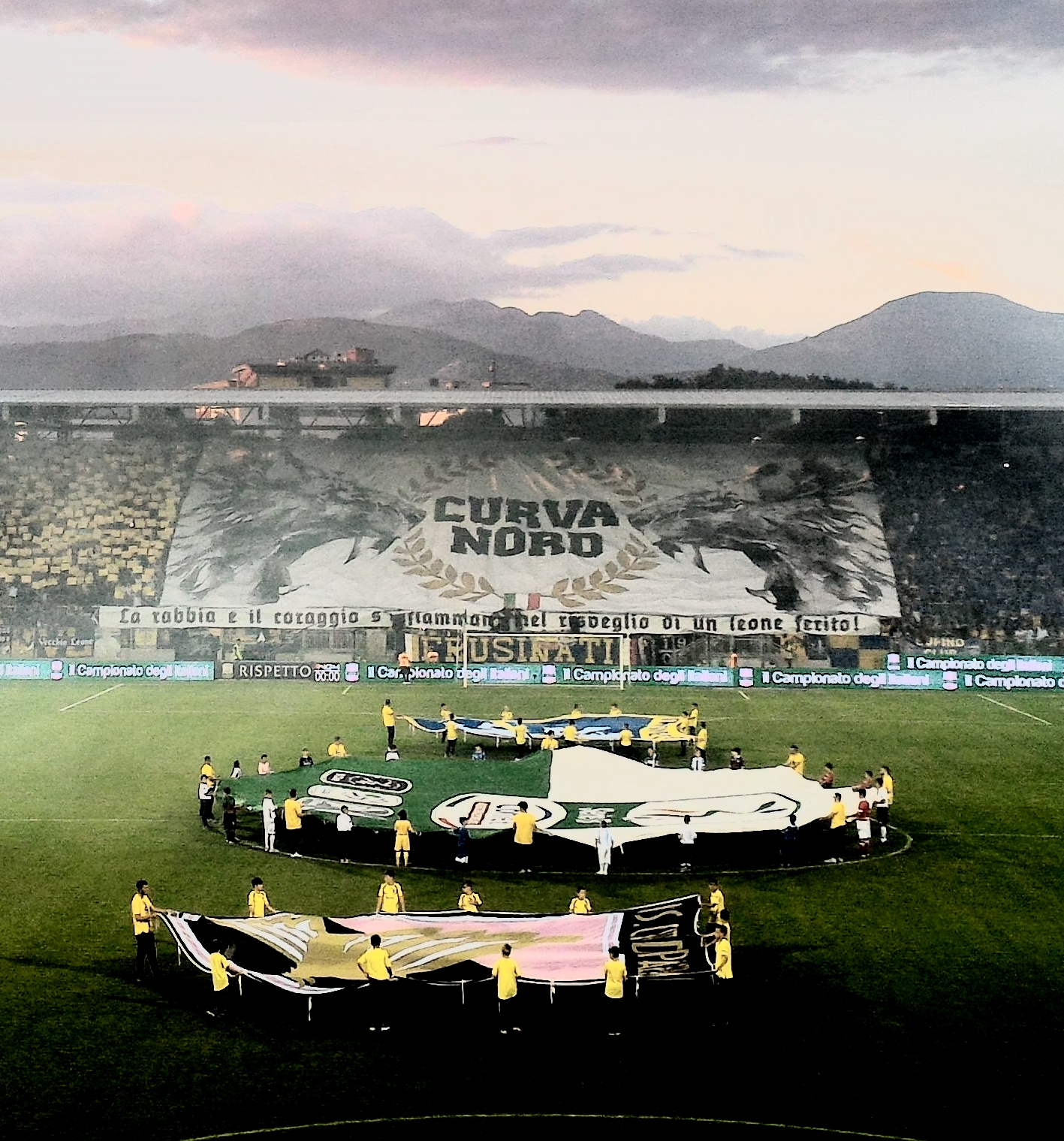
The North Stand (June 2018)

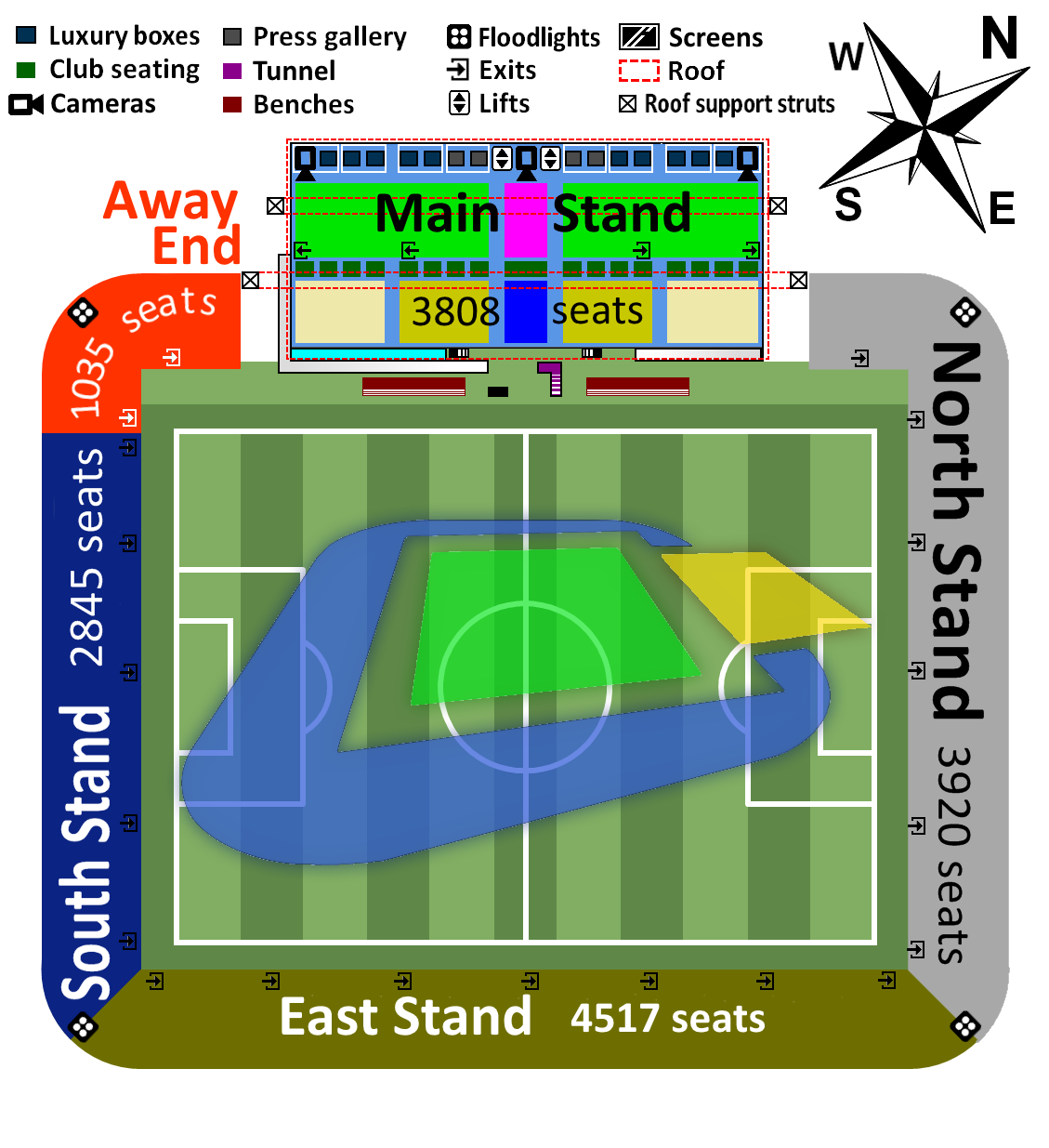
Outline of Benito Stirpe with the stand names and capacities

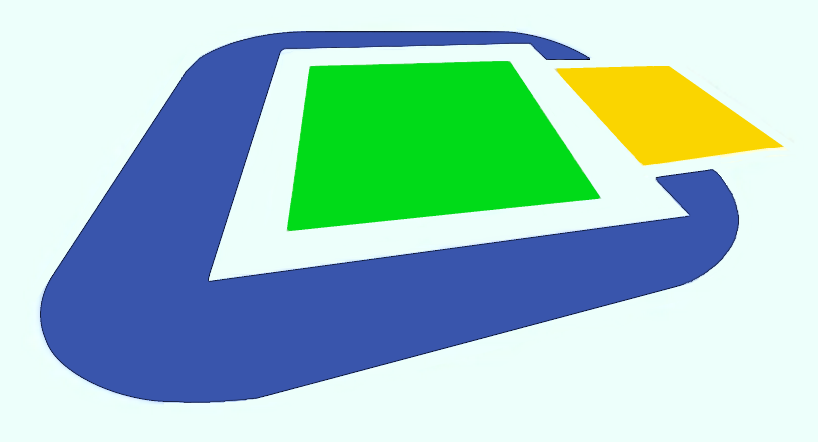
Official logo of the Benito Stirpe Stadium

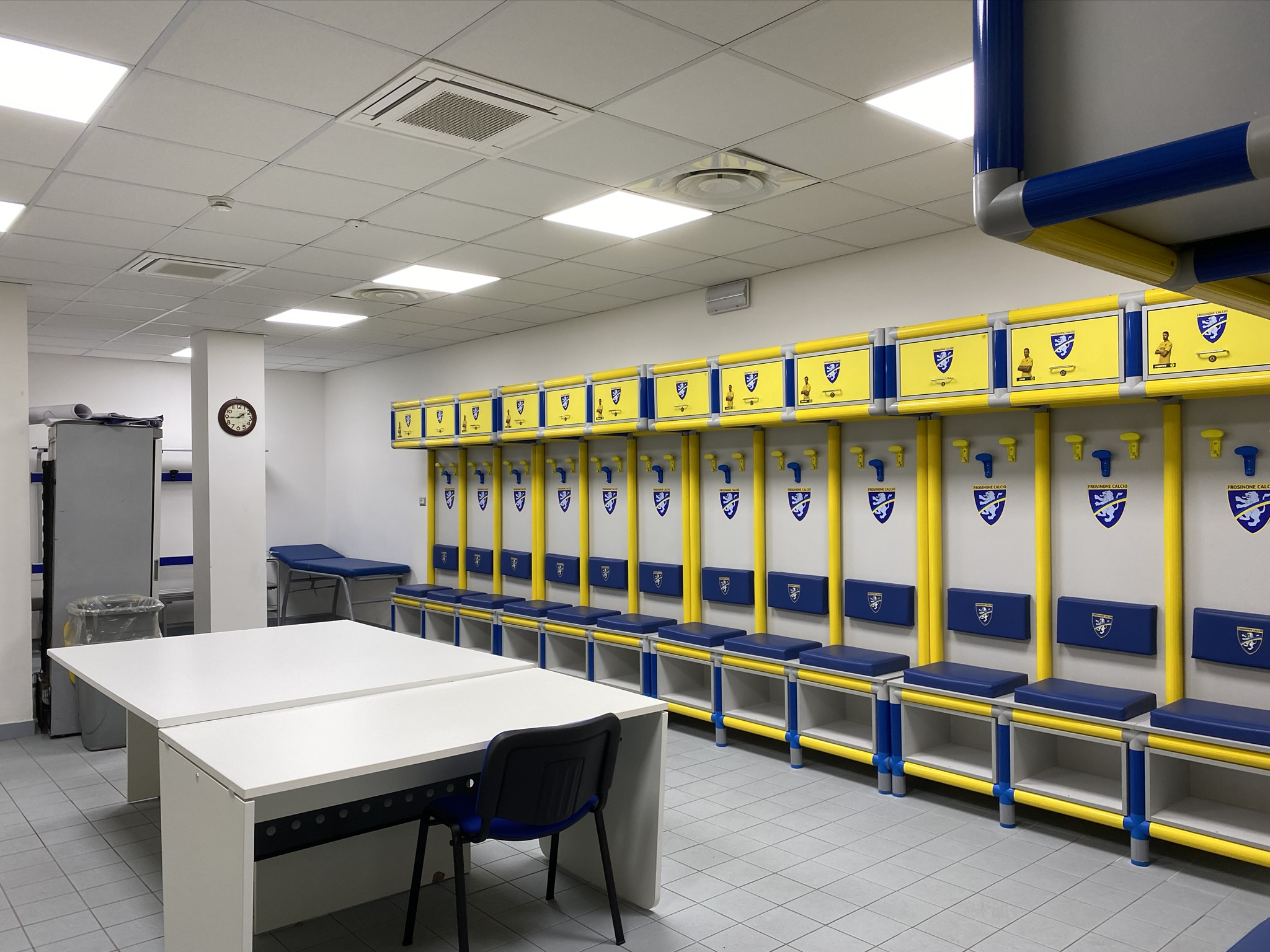
Frosinone‘s dressing room at the stadio Benito Stirpe
