= Gabriele Bracaglia =

Italian footballer

Personal information
- Date of birth: 19 July 2003 (age 23)
- Place of birth: Frosinone, Italy
- Height: 1.85 m (6 ft 1 in)
- Position: Defender

Team information
- Current team: Frosinone
- Number: 79

Youth career
- 2008–2023: Frosinone

Senior career*
Years	Team	Apps	(Gls)
2024–	Frosinone	60	(7)
2023–2024	→ Renate (loan)	17	(0)

International career^{‡}
2018	Italy U15	1	(0)
- * Club domestic league appearances and goals as of 20:20, 29 August 2026 (UTC) ‡ National team caps and goals as of 21:55, 25 July 2026 (UTC)

Gabriele Bracaglia (born 19 July 2003) is an Italian professional footballer who plays as a defender for Serie A club Frosinone.

== Club career ==
Bracaglia joined the academy of Frosinone at the age of 5, and climbed through all their youth levels. In 2023, he joined Serie C club Renate where he began his senior career. He returned to Frosinone for the 2024–25 season in Serie B. On 22 June 2025, he extended his contract with Frosinone until 2028. He helped Frosinone earn promotion in the Serie A for the 2025–26 season.

== International career ==
Bracaglia first represented the Italy U15s in a friendly tournament in March 2018.

== Career statistics ==
As of match played 29 August 2026

Appearances and goals by club, season and competition
Club	Season	League			National cup		Other		Total	
Club	Season	Division	Apps	Goals	Apps	Goals	Apps	Goals	Apps	Goals
Frosinone	2024–25	Serie B	26	1	0	0	—		26	1
Frosinone	2025–26	Serie B	32	5	2	0	—		34	5
Frosinone	2026–27	Serie A	2	1	1	0	—		3	1
Frosinone	Total		60	7	3	0	—		63	7
Renate (loan)	2023–24	Serie C	17	0	—		—		17	0
Career total			67	7	3	0	0	0	70	7
