= Matteo Cichella =

Italian footballer

Personal information
- Full name: Matteo Cichella
- Date of birth: October 4, 2005 (age 21)
- Place of birth: Rome, Italy
- Height: 1.69 m (5 ft 6 1/2 in)
- Position: Midfielder

Team information
- Current team: Frosinone
- Number: 16

Youth career
- Roma

Senior career*
Years	Team	Apps	(Gls)
2024–	Frosinone	62	(4)

International career^{‡}
2024–2025	Italy U20	6	(0)
- * Club domestic league appearances and goals as of 20:20, 29 October 2026 (UTC) ‡ National team caps and goals as of 17:09, 26 July 2026 (UTC)

Matteo Cichella (born 4 October 2005) is an Italian professional footballer who plays as a midfielder for Serie A club Frosinone.

== Club career ==
Cichella is a product of the youth academy of the Italian club Roma. On 12 January 2024, he joined Serie B club Frosinone. He made his senior and professional debut with Frosinone in a 3–0 Coppa Italia loss to Pisa. On 2 July 2025, he extended his contract with Frosinone. The club achieve promotion to Serie A at the end of the 2025–26 season.

== International career ==
Cichella was called up to the Italy U20s for Under 20 Elite League matches in October 2024.

== Personal life ==
Cichella's father Luca, and his uncles Francesco and Ernesto Cichella were semi-professional footballers.
