= Farès Ghedjemis =

Algerian professional footballer (born 2002)

Personal information
- Date of birth: 6 September 2002 (age 24)
- Place of birth: Montreuil, France
- Height: 1.83 m (6 ft 0 in)
- Position: Winger

Team information
- Current team: Frosinone
- Number: 7

Youth career
- Chelles
- Torcy
- Neuilly-sur-Marne
- 2014–2015: UJA Maccabi
- 2015–2016: Montfermeil
- 2016–2017: Créteil
- 2017–2021: Troyes
- 2021–2022: Le Havre

Senior career*
Years	Team	Apps	(Gls)
2021–2022	Le Havre B	14	(1)
2022–2023	Évreux	16	(1)
2023	Vannes	16	(8)
2023–2024	Rouen	19	(5)
2024–	Frosinone	72	(18)

International career^{‡}
2026–	Algeria	2	(1)
- * Club domestic league appearances and goals as of 17:17, 1 November 2026 (UTC) ‡ National team caps and goals as of 27 June 2026

Farès Ghedjemis (Arabic: فارس قدجيميس; born 6 September 2002) is a professional footballer who plays as a forward for Serie A club Frosinone. Born in France, he plays for the Algeria national team.

== Early life ==
Born in Montreuil, Seine-Saint-Denis, France, Ghedjemis has Algerian origins. His mother is from Bejaïa and his father from Kenchela. He comes from a sports family, including his father Khalid Ghedjemis, a former N2 player.

Ghedjemis started playing football at Chelles, Seine-et-Marne. He subsequently played for Torcy, Neuilly-sur-Marne, UJA Maccabi, Montfermeil, Créteil, Troyes and Le Havre.

== Club career ==
After playing with Le Havre's reserve team in National 3, Ghedjemis started playing with the first teams of Évreux and Vannes, both times in National 2.

In the summer 2023, after scoring six goals and delivering six assists in half a season for Vannes, he was part of the revelations of the 2022–23 National 2, but was a free agent after his club suffered relegation to the fifth tier. Despite being reportedly followed by several French professional leagues clubs, he joined third division side FC Rouen.

In January 2024, he was transferred to Frosinone in Serie A for €300,000, plus 10% of a potential future sale, making it the record sale for Rouen. He signed a two-year contract with the Italian side.

== International career ==
Born in France, Ghedjemis is of Algerian descent. He was called up to the Algeria national team for a set of friendlies in March 2026. He debuted with Algeria in a 7–0 friendly win over Guatemala on 27 March 2026, and scored his side's sixth goal. On 31 May 2026, Ghedjemis was named in Vladimir Petković's 26-man Algeria squad for the 2026 FIFA World Cup.

== Style of play ==
A left-footed winger, Ghedjemis can play on both wings, with a preference for the right side on his inverted foot. He was compared to his fellow Le Havre graduate Riyad Mahrez.
