= 2025–26 FC Südtirol season =

Italian association football club season

FC Südtirol
2025–26 season
- President: Reinhold Eisenstecken
- Manager: Fabrizio Castori
- Stadium: Stadio Druso
- Serie B: 10th
- Coppa Italia: First round
- Top goalscorer: League: All: Daniele Casiraghi (2)
- Biggest defeat: Como 3–1 Südtirol

The 2025–26 season is the 52nd in the history of Fußball Club Südtirol and the club’s fourth consecutive season in Serie B. In addition to participating in the domestic league, the team also competed in the Coppa Italia.

== Squad ==
=== Transfers In ===
| Pos. | Player | Transferred from | Fee | Date | Source |
|---|---|---|---|---|---|
| DF | (Albania) Cristian Shiba | (Italy) Arzignano Valchiampo | Loan return | 30 June 2025 | |
| MF | (Italy) Lorenzo Lonardi | (Italy) Pescara | Loan return | 30 June 2025 | |
| GK | (Lithuania) Marius Adamonis | (Italy) Catania FC | Undisclosed | 1 July 2025 | |
| MF | (Senegal) Mamadou Coulibaly | (Italy) Catanzaro | Free | 10 July 2025 | |
| DF | (Brazil) Filipe Bordon | (Italy) Lazio | Loan | 10 July 2025 | |
| FW | (Italy) Emanuele Pecorino | (Italy) Juventus Next Gen | Loan | 11 July 2025 | |
| MF | (Italy) Simone Tronchin | (Italy) Cittadella | Undisclosed | 16 July 2025 | |
| FW | (Cameroon) Jonathan Italeng | (Italy) Atalanta U23 | Loan | 22 July 2025 | |
| DF | (Italy) Davide Mancini | (Italy) Campobasso | Loan | 1 September 2025 | |

=== Transfers Out ===
| Pos. | Player | Transferred to | Fee | Date | Source |
|---|---|---|---|---|---|
| FW | (Italy) Gabriele Gori | (Italy) Avellino | Loan return | 30 June 2025 | |
| MF | (Ghana) Shaka Mawuli | (Italy) Arezzo | Undisclosed | 1 July 2025 | |
| DF | (Italy) Benedikt Rottensteiner | (Italy) Bra | Undisclosed | 9 July 2025 | |
| MF | (Italy) Lorenzo Lonardi | (Italy) Ravenna | Undisclosed | 5 August 2025 | |
| DF | (Italy) Alessandro Vimercati | (Italy) Picerno | Loan | 5 August 2025 | |
| GK | (Italy) Giacomo Drago | (Italy) Lumezzane | Loan | 26 August 2025 | |
| FW | (Italy) Edoardo Vergani | (Italy) Frosinone | Undisclosed | 27 August 2025 | |
| DF | (Albania) Cristian Shiba | | Contract terminated | 1 September 2025 | |

== Friendlies ==
| 3 August 2025 | Südtirol | 2–2 | Hellas Verona |

| 9 August 2025 | Trento | 2–1 | Südtirol |

| 13 August 2025 | Südtirol | 10–0 | Virtus Bolzano | Maso Ronco |
| 18:00 | | | | Referee: Alessandro Dallagà |

| 6 September 2025 | Südtirol | 0–0 | (Austria) WSG Tirol | Appiano |
| 13:00 | | | | Stadium: Zona Sportiva di Maso Ronco |

== Competitions ==
=== Overall record ===
| Competition | First match | Last match | Starting round | Final position | Record | | | | | | | |
| Competition | First match | Last match | Starting round | Final position | Pld | W | D | L | GF | GA | GD | Win % |
|---|---|---|---|---|---|---|---|---|---|---|---|---|
| Serie B | 24 August 2024 | 8–10 May 2026 | Matchday 1 | | 4 | 1 | 2 | 1 | 6 | 6 | +0 | 25.00 |
| Coppa Italia | 16 August 2025 | | First round | First round | 1 | 0 | 0 | 1 | 1 | 3 | −2 | 0.00 |
| Total | | | | | 5 | 1 | 2 | 2 | 7 | 9 | −2 | 20.00 |

Last updated: 19 September 2025
Source: Competitions

=== Serie B ===
==== League table ====
| Pos | Team | Pld | W | D | L | GF | GA | GD | Pts | Promotion, qualification or relegation |
|---|---|---|---|---|---|---|---|---|---|---|
| 14 | Virtus Entella | 38 | 10 | 12 | 16 | 36 | 51 | −15 | 42 | |
| 15 | Empoli | 38 | 9 | 14 | 15 | 47 | 54 | −7 | 41 | |
| 16 | Südtirol (O) | 38 | 8 | 17 | 13 | 38 | 48 | −10 | 41 | Qualification for relegation play-out |
| 17 | Bari (R) | 38 | 10 | 10 | 18 | 38 | 60 | −22 | 40 | Qualification for relegation play-out |
| 18 | Reggiana (R) | 38 | 9 | 10 | 19 | 36 | 56 | −20 | 37 | Relegation to Serie C |

Source: Serie BKT
Rules for classification: 1) Points; 2) Head-to-head points; 3) Head-to-head goal difference; 4) Goal difference; 5) Goals scored; 6) Draw.
(Note: Head-to-head record is used only after all the matches between the teams in question have been played)
(O) Play-off winners; (R) Relegated

==== Results by round ====
| Round | 1 | 2 | 3 | 4 |
|---|---|---|---|---|
| Ground | A | H | H | A |
| Result | D | W | L | D |
| Position | 9 | 1 | 10 | |

Updated to match(es) played on 19 September 2025. Source:
A = Away; H = Home; W = Win; D = Draw; L = Loss

==== Matches ====
| 24 August 2025 1 | Catanzaro | 1–1 | Südtirol | Catanzaro |
| 20:00 UTC+2 | Iemmello 61' | | Kofler 13', (yellow card) 90+3'; El Kaouakibi (yellow card) 42' | Stadium: Stadio Nicola Ceravolo; Attendance: 12,125; Referee: Claudio Giuseppe Allegretta |

| 31 August 2025 2 | Südtirol | 3–1 | Sampdoria | Bolzano |
| 18:00 UTC+2 | Casiraghi 8'; Merkaj 19'; Adamonis (yellow card) 29'; El Kaouakibi 31' | | Depaoli (yellow card) 62'; Pedrola (yellow card) 85'; Coda 90' | Stadium: Stadio Druso; Attendance: 4,002; Referee: Michael Fabbri |

| 14 September 2025 3 | Südtirol | 0–2 | Palermo | Bolzano |
| 16:15 UTC+2 | Mallamo (yellow card) 75'; Martini (yellow card) 88' | | Pohjanpalo 2', 80'; Bani (yellow card) 21'; Peda (yellow card) 47'; Augello (yellow card) 68' | Stadium: Stadio Druso; Attendance: 4,707; Referee: Federico La Penna |

| 19 September 2025 4 | Frosinone | 2–2 | Südtirol | Frosinone |
| 18:00 UTC+2 | Calò 10' (pen.), (yellow card) 78'; Ghedjemis 30'; Calvani (yellow card) 74' | | Martini 72'; S. Davi (yellow card) 78'; Merkaj 78' (pen.), (yellow card) 79' | Stadium: Stadio Benito Stirpe; Attendance: 9,763; Referee: Andrea Zanotti |

| 27 September 2025 5 | Südtirol | 3–1 | Reggiana | Bolzano |
| 15:00 UTC+2 | Martini 18'; Merkaj 26'; Tronchin 56'; Coulibaly (yellow card) 82' | | Portanova 59' | Stadium: Stadio Druso; Attendance: 4,135; Referee: Matteo Marcenaro |

| 1 October 2025 6 | Pescara | 1–1 | Südtirol | Pescara |
| 19:30 UTC+2 | Olzer (yellow card) 20'; Meazzi 90+5', (yellow card) 90+7' | | S. Davi (yellow card) 29'; Mallamo (yellow card) 32'; Coulibaly 65'; Italeng (yellow card) 90+4' | Stadium: Stadio Adriatico; Attendance: 5,971; Referee: Luca Massimi |

| 5 October 2025 7 | Südtirol | 1–2 | Empoli | Bolzano |
| 15:00 UTC+2 | Kofler (red card) 5'; Pecorino 42'; Adamonis (yellow card) 67'; Tronchin (yellow card) 90+9' | | Shpendi 60'; Ceesay (yellow card) 80'; Guarino (yellow card) 87'; Nasti 90+6' | Stadium: Stadio Druso; Attendance: 3,439; Referee: Valerio Crezzini |

| 18 October 2025 8 | Mantova | 1–1 | Südtirol | Mantua |
| 15:00 UTC+2 | Ruocco 55'; Bragantini (yellow card) 70' | | F. Davi (yellow card) 9'; Bordon (yellow card) 20'; Pecorino 40'; S. Davi (yellow card) 64' | Stadium: Stadio Danilo Martelli; Attendance: 7,194; Referee: Davide Di Marco |

| 25 October 2025 9 | Südtirol | 0–1 | Cesena | Bolzano |
| 15:00 UTC+2 | Martini (yellow card) 24'; F. Davi (yellow card) 80' | | Shpendi 31'; Mangraviti (yellow card) 34'; Olivieri (yellow card) 90+3' | Stadium: Stadio Druso; Attendance: 4,075; Referee: Andrea Zanotti |

| 29 October 2025 10 | Venezia | 3–0 | Südtirol | Venice |
| 20:30 UTC+2 | Doumbia 39'; Pérez 45+2'; Adorante (yellow card) 61'; Yeboah 67' | | Masiello (yellow card) 5'; Kofler (yellow card) 75' | Stadium: Stadio Pier Luigi Penzo; Attendance: 7,747; Referee: Ermanno Feliciani |

| 1 November 2025 11 | Padova | 1–1 | Südtirol | Padua |
| 18:00 UTC+2 | Barreca (yellow card) 57'; Capelli (yellow card) 61'; Di Maggio (yellow card) 77'; Bortolussi 85' (pen.); Harder (yellow card) 90+1' | | Merkaj 43'; F. Davi (yellow card) 65'; Mancini (yellow card) 81'; Molina (yellow card) 84' | Stadium: Stadio Euganeo; Attendance: 7,078; Referee: Mario Perri |

| 8 November 2025 12 | Südtirol | 1–1 | Carrarese | Bolzano |
| 15:00 UTC+2 | Merkaj (red card) 14'; Odogwu 52' | | Zuelli (yellow card) 14'; Sekulov (yellow card) 34'; Schiavi 49' (pen.) | Stadium: Stadio Druso; Attendance: 3,022; Referee: Niccolò Turrini |

| 23 November 2025 13 | Modena | 0–0 | Südtirol | Modena |
| 15:00 UTC+2 | | | | Stadium: Stadio Alberto Braglia; Attendance: 10,890; Referee: Andrea Zanotti |

| 29 November 2025 14 | Südtirol | 0–1 | Avellino | Bolzano |
| 15:30 UTC+2 | Tronchin (yellow card) 17'; Coulibaly (yellow card) 41'; Pecorino (yellow card) 67'; Merkaj (yellow card) 90+3' | | Biasci 10'; Daffara (yellow card) 70' | Stadium: Stadio Druso; Attendance: 3,725; Referee: Antonio Rapuano |

| 8 December 2025 15 | Monza | 1–1 | Südtirol | Monza |
| 15:00 UTC+2 | Marić 32'; Carboni (yellow card) 90+2' | | Martini (yellow card) 11'; Odogwu 76', (yellow card) 87' | Stadium: Stadio Brianteo; Attendance: 5,290; Referee: Giovanni Ayroldi |

| 13 December 2025 16 | Südtirol | 0–0 | Bari | Bolzano |
| 15:00 UTC+2 | El Kaouakibi (yellow card) 4'; Tronchin (red card) 25'; Zedadka (yellow card) 34'; S. Davi (yellow card) 78' | | Verreth (yellow card) 6'; Partipilo (yellow card) 61' | Stadium: Stadio Druso; Attendance: 3,586; Referee: Giuseppe Collu |

| 21 December 2025 17 | Virtus Entella | 1–1 | Südtirol | Chiavari |
| 15:00 UTC+2 | Guiu (yellow card) 15'; Franzoni (yellow card) 38'; Debenedetti 43'; Vecchia (yellow card) 78' | | Veseli (yellow card) 29'; Martini (yellow card) 58'; Odogwu 90+4' | Stadium: Stadio Comunale; Attendance: 2,389; Referee: Luca Massimi |

| 27 December 2025 18 | Juve Stabia | 1–0 | Südtirol | Castellammare di Stabia |
| 15:00 UTC+2 | Maistro 19'; Burnete (yellow card) 68' | | Tronchin (yellow card) 48'; Kofler (yellow card) 79'; S. Davi (yellow card) 68' | Stadium: Stadio Romeo Menti; Attendance: 4,956; Referee: Livio Marinelli |

| 10 January 2026 19 | Südtirol | 2–1 | Spezia | Bolzano |
| 15:00 UTC+2 | Pecorino 34'; Kofler 51'; Merkaj (yellow card) 80' | | Vignali (yellow card) 28'; Vlahović 31'; Adamo (yellow card) 87' | Stadium: Stadio Druso; Attendance: 3,990; Referee: Gianluca Manganiello |

| 17 January 2026 20 | Empoli | 0–1 | Südtirol | Empoli |
| 15:00 UTC+2 | | | Zedadka (yellow card) 19'; Pecorino 24'; Merkaj (yellow card) 45'; Tait (yellow card) 46'; Verdi (yellow card) 81'; Tronchin (yellow card) 86' | Stadium: Stadio Carlo Castellani; Attendance: 5,760; Referee: Kevin Bonacina |

| 25 January 2026 21 | Südtirol | 3–0 | Padova | Bolzano |
| 16:30 UTC+2 | Merkaj 27'; Pecorino 38'; Kofler (yellow card) 60'; Zedadka (yellow card) 64'; Frigerio (yellow card) 87'; Casiraghi 90+4' (pen.) | | Villa (yellow card) 26' | Stadium: Stadio Druso; Attendance: 3,570; Referee: Claudio Giuseppe Allegretta |

| 31 January 2026 22 | Südtirol | 2–1 | Catanzaro | Bolzano |
| 15:00 UTC+2 | Zedadka 3', (yellow card) 90+5'; Tait (yellow card) 14'; Merkaj 21'; Tronchin (yellow card) 55'; Adamonis (yellow card) 78' | | Pittarello 6'; Petriccione (yellow card) 45+1' | Stadium: Stadio Druso; Attendance: 3,808; Referee: Niccolò Turrini |

| 7 February 2026 23 | Carrarese | 0–0 | Südtirol | Carrara |
| 15:00 UTC+2 | Abiuso (yellow card) 79'; Oliana (yellow card) 90+3' | | S. Davi (yellow card) 49'; Merkaj (yellow card) 67' | Stadium: Stadio dei Marmi; Attendance: 3,512; Referee: Andrea Calzavara |

| 11 February 2026 24 | Südtirol | 0–0 | Monza | Bolzano |
| 19:00 UTC+2 | Tronchin (yellow card) 48'; Veseli (yellow card) 90+5' | | Colombo (yellow card) 42' | Stadium: Stadio Druso; Attendance: 3,401; Referee: Giuseppe Mucera |

| 15 February 2026 25 | Bari | 1–2 | Südtirol | Bari |
| 15:00 UTC+2 | Rao 80' | | Verdi (yellow card) 13'; Kofler (yellow card) 15'; Merkaj 48'; Molina (yellow card) 60'; Manè 75' (o.g.) | Stadium: Stadio San Nicola; Attendance: 9,303; Referee: Luca Massimi |

| 21 February 2026 26 | Palermo | 3–0 | Südtirol | Palermo |
| 15:00 UTC+2 | Pohjanpalo 21' (pen.); Le Douaron 38'; Ceccaroni 52' | Report | Frigerio (yellow card) 54'; Tonin (yellow card) 90+3' | Stadium: Stadio Renzo Barbera; Attendance: 24,915; Referee: Valerio Crezzini |

| 28 February 2026 27 | Südtirol | 1–1 | Venezia | Bolzano |
| 15:00 UTC+2 | Bordon (yellow card) 19'; Merkaj 47' | | Hainaut 54'; Pérez (yellow card) 63'; Casas (yellow card) 90' | Stadium: Stadio Druso; Attendance: 4,328; Referee: Federico La Penna |

| 3 March 2026 28 | Reggiana | 0–4 | Südtirol | Reggio Emilia |
| 20:00 UTC+2 | Sampirisi (yellow card) 52' | | Kofler 39'; Pecorino (yellow card) 47', (goal) 83'; Casiraghi 86'; Merkaj 90+3' | Stadium: Mapei Stadium – Città del Tricolore; Attendance: 8,031; Referee: Andrea Zanotti |

| 7 March 2026 29 | Südtirol | 0–1 | Virtus Entella | Bolzano |
| 15:00 UTC+2 | Kofler (yellow card) 11' | | Marconi (yellow card) 32', (goal) 73'; Bariti (yellow card) 38' | Stadium: Stadio Druso; Attendance: 3,065; Referee: Andrea Calzavara |

| 15 March 2026 30 | Südtirol | 0–0 | Pescara | Bolzano |
| 17:15 UTC+2 | Casiraghi (yellow card) 21'; Zedadka (yellow card) 49'; Veseli (yellow card) 76'; Tait (red card) 77'; Pecorino (yellow card) 84'; Masiello (yellow card) 90+3' | | Valzania (yellow card) 65' | Stadium: Stadio Druso; Attendance: 3,969; Referee: Claudio Giuseppe Allegretta |

| 18 March 2026 31 | Avellino | 3–2 | Südtirol | Avellino |
| 20:00 UTC+2 | Patierno 24', (yellow card) 56'; Cancellotti (yellow card) 46'; Izzo (yellow card) 47', (goal) 80'; Šimić (yellow card) 52'; Palmiero (yellow card) 58'; Besaggio 72' | | Bordon (yellow card) 1'; Adamonis (yellow card) 32'; El Kaouakibi (yellow card) 47'; Casiraghi 52' (pen.); Pecorino (yellow card) 62', (goal) 75'; Veseli (yellow card) 80'; Tronchin (yellow card) 90+5' | Stadium: Stadio Partenio-Adriano Lombardi; Attendance: 9,165; Referee: Simone Galipò |

| 22 March 2026 32 | Südtirol | 1–3 | Frosinone | Bolzano |
| 15:00 UTC+2 | Pecorino (yellow card) 40', (goal) 60'; Bordon (yellow card) 90+7' | | Raimondo 7'; Bracaglia (yellow card) 30'; Kvernadze (yellow card) 38'; Gelli (yellow card) 45+1'; Monterisi (yellow card) 50'; Calò (yellow card) 62', (goal) 68'; Ghedjemis 85'; Koutsoupias (yellow card) 89' | Stadium: Stadio Druso; Attendance: 3,666; Referee: Marco Piccinini |

| 6 April 2026 33 | Cesena | 1–1 | Südtirol | Cesena |
| 11:30 UTC+2 | F. Davi 17' (o.g.) | | Tait 3'; Molina (yellow card) 6'; F. Davi (yellow card) 43'; S. Davi (yellow card) 90+4' | Stadium: Stadio Dino Manuzzi; Attendance: 10,065; Referee: Claudio Giuseppe Allegretta |

| 11 April 2026 34 | Südtirol | 1–1 | Modena | Bolzano |
| 14:00 UTC+2 | Pietrangeli 60', (yellow card) 81' | | Santoro 21'; Beyuku (yellow card) 63' | Stadium: Stadio Druso; Attendance: 4,163; Referee: Andrea Zanotti |

| 18 April 2026 35 | Spezia | 6–1 | Südtirol | La Spezia |
| 14:00 UTC+2 | Valoti 8' (pen.); Di Serio 25'; Beruatto 33'; Lapadula 70'; Sernicola 73'; Aurelio 82' | | Pecorino 20'; Zedadka (red card) 23'; Merkaj (yellow card) 30' | Stadium: Stadio Alberto Picco; Attendance: 8,263; Referee: Rosario Abisso |

| 25 April 2026 36 | Südtirol | 0–3 | Mantova | Bolzano |
| 14:00 UTC+2 | Masiello (yellow card) 41'; Merkaj (yellow card) 70' | | Trimboli 35'; Marras 41'; Wieser 83', (yellow card) 84' | Stadium: Stadio Druso; Attendance: 5,063; Referee: Maria Sole Ferrieri Caputi |

| 1 May 2026 37 | Sampdoria | 1–0 | Südtirol | Genoa |
| 14:00 UTC+2 | Abildgaard 31'; Palma (yellow card) 53'; Conti (yellow card) 90+3' | | Molina (yellow card) 30'; Črnigoj (yellow card) 62' | Stadium: Stadio Luigi Ferraris; Attendance: 28,652; Referee: Matteo Marchetti |

| 8 May 2026 38 | Südtirol | 1–1 | Juve Stabia | Bolzano |
| 19:30 UTC+2 | Črnigoj 60'; Zedadka (yellow card) 90' | | Gabrielloni 36' | Stadium: Stadio Druso; Attendance: 5,064; Referee: Livio Marinelli |

==== Relegation play-out ====
| 15 May 2026 First leg | Bari | 0−0 | Südtirol | Bari |
| 19:00 UTC+2 | Moncini (yellow card) 45+2'; Cerofolini (yellow card) 57'; Piscopo (yellow card) 72'; Bellomo (yellow card) 88' | Report | Merkaj (yellow card) 54'; Tronchin (yellow card) 60' | Stadium: Stadio San Nicola; Attendance: 9,303; Referee: Antonio Rapuano |

| 22 May 2026 | Südtirol | 0−0 (0−0 agg.) | Bari | Bolzano |
| 19:00 UTC+2 | El Kaouakibi (yellow card) 19' | Report | Pucino (red card) 23'; Maggiore (yellow card) 39'; Odenthal (yellow card) 81'; Artioli (yellow card) 85' | Stadium: Stadio Druso; Attendance: 5,500; Referee: Federico La Penna |

The relegation play-out ended 0–0 on aggregate. As Südtirol finished the regular season in a higher position than Bari, Südtirol remained in Serie B, while Bari were relegated to Serie C.

=== Coppa Italia ===
| 16 August 2025 Round of 32 | Como | 3–1 | Südtirol | Como |
| 18:30 UTC+2 | Douvikas 39', 40'; Da Cunha 42'; Roberto (yellow card) 49' | | Casiraghi 13' (pen.); Bordon (yellow card) 69' (yellow-red card) 88' | Stadium: Stadio Giuseppe Sinigaglia; Referee: Simone Galipò |
