= 2024–25 FC Südtirol season =

FC Südtirol
2024–25 season
- Manager: Federico Valente (until 4 November); Marco Zaffaroni (from 4 November to 7 December); Fabrizio Castori (from 8 December 2024 to 13 May 2025)
- Stadium: Stadio Druso
- Serie B: 10th
- Coppa Italia: First round
Home colours	Away colours

The 2024–25 season is Fußball Club Südtirol's 51st season in existence and the club's third consecutive season in the second division of Italian football. In addition to the domestic league, FC Südtirol participates in this season's edition of the Coppa Italia.

== Players ==
=== First-team squad ===
As of 21 August 2024

Note: Flags indicate national team as defined under FIFA eligibility rules; some limited exceptions apply. Players may hold more than one non-FIFA nationality.

No.	Pos.	Nation	Player
1	GK	ITA	Giacomo Poluzzi
2	DF	MAR	Hamza El Kaouakibi
3	DF	ITA	Andrea Cagnano
4	MF	ITA	Tommaso Arrigoni
5	DF	ITA	Andrea Masiello
6	MF	ITA	Jacopo Martini
7	FW	ITA	Matteo Rover
8	MF	ITA	Alessandro Mallamo
9	FW	ITA	Valerio Crespi (on loan from Lazio)
11	MF	ALG	Karim Zedadka
12	GK	ITA	Giacomo Drago
14	DF	ITA	Federico Davi
15	DF	ITA	Benedikt Rottensteiner
17	MF	ITA	Daniele Casiraghi

No.	Pos.	Nation	Player
19	DF	ITA	Nicola Pietrangeli
21	MF	ITA	Fabian Tait
23	DF	ITA	Luca Ceppitelli
24	DF	ITA	Simone Davi
26	FW	ITA	Andrea Cisco
27	MF	SLO	Jasmin Kurtić
28	DF	ITA	Raphael Kofler
30	DF	ITA	Andrea Giorgini
33	FW	ALB	Silvio Merkaj
68	DF	ITA	Alessandro Vimercati
79	MF	ITA	Salvatore Molina
90	FW	ITA	Raphael Odogwu
99	MF	POL	Mateusz Praszelik (on loan from Hellas Verona)

=== Out on loan ===
Note: Flags indicate national team as defined under FIFA eligibility rules; some limited exceptions apply. Players may hold more than one non-FIFA nationality.

No.	Pos.	Nation	Player
—	MF	ITA	Lorenzo Lonardi (at Pescara until 30 June 2025)

== Transfers ==
=== In ===
Pos.	Player	Transferred from	Fee	Date	Source

=== Out ===
Pos.	Player	Transferred to	Fee	Date	Source

== Competitions ==
=== Overall record ===
Competition	First match	Last match	Starting round	Final position	Record							
Competition	First match	Last match	Starting round	Final position	Pld	W	D	L	GF	GA	GD	Win %
Serie B	17 August 2024	May 2025	Matchday 1		16	4	1	11	15	29	−14	25.00
Coppa Italia	9 August 2024		First round	First round	1	0	1	0	0	0	+0	0.00
Total					17	4	2	11	15	29	−14	23.53

Last updated: 27 August 2024
Source: Soccerway

=== Serie B ===
==== League table ====
Pos	Team	Pld	W	D	L	GF	GA	GD	Pts	Promotion, qualification or relegation
8	Palermo	38	14	10	14	52	43	+9	52	Qualification for promotion play-offs preliminary round
9	Bari	38	10	18	10	41	40	+1	48	
10	Südtirol	38	12	10	16	50	57	−7	46	
11	Modena	38	10	15	13	48	50	−2	45	
12	Carrarese	38	11	12	15	39	49	−10	45	

Source: Serie BKT
Rules for classification: 1) Points; 2) Head-to-head points; 3) Head-to-head goal difference; 4) Goal difference; 5) Goals scored; 6) Draw.
(Note: Head-to-head record is used only after all the matches between the teams in question have been played)

==== Results summary ====
Overall								Home						Away					
Pld	W	D	L	GF	GA	GD	Pts	W	D	L	GF	GA	GD	W	D	L	GF	GA	GD
16	4	1	11	15	29	−14	13	2	1	5	9	18	−9	2	0	6	6	11	−5

Last updated: August 2024.
Source: Soccerway

==== Results by round ====
Round	1	2	3	4	5	6	7	8	9	10	11	12	13	14	15	16
Ground	H	H	A	H	A	A	H	A	H	A	H	A	H	A	H	A
Result	W	W	L	L	W	L	L	W	L	L	D	L	L	L	L	L
Position	4	1	5	10	4	7	12	6	9	14	13	16	18	17	19	20
Points	3	6	6	6	9	9	9	12	12	12	13	13	13	13	13	13

Source: Serie BKT
A = Away; H = Home; W = Win; D = Draw; L = Loss; P = Postponed

==== Matches ====
The league fixtures were announced on 10 July 2024.

17 August 2024 1	Südtirol	2–1	Modena	Bolzano
20:30 CEST	Mallamo 6'; Giorgini (yellow card) 54'; Rover 90'	Report	Pergreffi (yellow card) 31'; Gliozzi (yellow card) 47'; Palumbo (yellow card) 90+4'	Stadium: Stadio Druso; Attendance: 3,513; Referee: Mario Perri

24 August 2024 2	Südtirol	3–2	Salernitana	Bolzano
19:30 CEST	Casiraghi (yellow card) 7', (goal) 28' (pen.); Molina 42'; Rover 90+6'	Report	Velthuis (yellow card) 30'; Tongya 36'; Braaf 61'	Stadium: Stadio Druso; Attendance: 4,764; Referee: Daniele Perenzoni

27 August 2024 3	Carrarese	2–0	Südtirol	Pisa
20:30 CEST	Schiavi 45' (pen.); Finotto 56'	Report	Tait (yellow card) 42'; Rover (yellow card) 68'; Kurtić (yellow card) 90+1'	Stadium: Arena Garibaldi – Stadio Romeo Anconetani; Referee: Marco Monaldi
Note: Carrarese played the match at the Arena Garibaldi – Stadio Romeo Anconetani in Pisa, instead of their regular stadium, the Stadio dei Marmi, in Carrara, which is currently under renovation.

=== Coppa Italia ===
As a Serie B side, Südtirol entered the competition in the first round.

9 August 2024 First round	Monza	0–0 (9–8 p)	Südtirol	Monza
21:15 CEST	Izzo (yellow card) 64'; Kyriakopoulos (yellow card) 81'; Sensi (yellow card) 89'	Report	Arrigoni (yellow card) 36'	Stadium: Stadio Brianteo; Attendance: 7,139; Referee: Francesco Cosso
	Penalties
	Caprari (penalty scored); Mota (penalty scored); Sensi (penalty scored); Caldirola (penalty scored); Marić (penalty scored); Pereira (penalty scored); Kyriakopoulos (penalty scored); Bondo (penalty scored); Izzo (penalty scored)		(penalty scored) Merkaj; (penalty scored) Molina; (penalty scored) Kurtić; (penalty scored) Arrigoni; (penalty scored) Crespi; (penalty scored) Masiello; (penalty scored) Davi; (penalty scored) Ceppitelli; (penalty missed) Praszelik
