= 2023–24 FC Südtirol season =

FC Südtirol
2023–24 season
- Manager: Pierpaolo Bisoli (until 4 December); Federico Valente (from 5 December)
- Stadium: Stadio Druso
- Serie B: 16th
- Coppa Italia: Round of 32
Home colours	Away colours

The 2023–24 season is FC Südtirol's 118th season in existence and the club's second consecutive season in the second division of Italian football. In addition to the domestic league, FC Südtirol will participate in this season's edition of the Coppa Italia. The season covers the period from 1 July 2023 to 30 June 2024.

== Players ==
=== First-team squad ===
As of 6 September 2023

Note: Flags indicate national team as defined under FIFA eligibility rules; some limited exceptions apply. Players may hold more than one non-FIFA nationality.

No.	Pos.	Nation	Player
1	GK	(Italy) ITA	Giacomo Poluzzi
3	DF	(Italy) ITA	Andrea Cagnano
5	DF	(France) FRA	Kevin Vinetot
6	DF	(Italy) ITA	Luca Ghiringhelli
7	MF	(Italy) ITA	Nicholas Siega
8	MF	(Italy) ITA	Gabriel Lunetta
9	FW	(Italy) ITA	Emanuele Pecorino (on loan from Juventus)
11	MF	(Italy) ITA	Riccardo Ciervo (on loan from Sassuolo)
12	GK	(Italy) ITA	Giacomo Drago
14	DF	(Italy) ITA	Giuseppe Cuomo
15	MF	(Italy) ITA	Jérémie Broh (on loan from Palermo)
17	MF	(Italy) ITA	Daniele Casiraghi
18	FW	(Italy) ITA	Matteo Rover

No.	Pos.	Nation	Player
21	MF	(Italy) ITA	Fabian Tait
22	GK	(Italy) ITA	Stefan Alex Dregan
23	FW	(Italy) ITA	Nicola Rauti (on loan from Torino)
24	DF	(Italy) ITA	Simone Davì
26	FW	(Italy) ITA	Andrea Cisco
27	DF	(Albania) ALB	Cristian Shiba
28	DF	(Italy) ITA	Raphael Kofler
30	DF	(Italy) ITA	Andrea Giorgini
33	FW	(Albania) ALB	Silvio Merkaj
42	MF	(Belgium) BEL	Daouda Peeters (on loan from Juventus)
55	DF	(Italy) ITA	Andrea Masiello
77	MF	(Italy) ITA	Lorenzo Lonardi
90	FW	(Italy) ITA	Raphael Odogwu

=== Out on loan ===
Note: Flags indicate national team as defined under FIFA eligibility rules; some limited exceptions apply. Players may hold more than one non-FIFA nationality.

No.	Pos.	Nation	Player
—	DF	(Italy) ITA	Marco Curto (at Como until 30 June 2024)
—	DF	(Italy) ITA	Jonas Heinz (at Taranto until 30 June 2024)

No.	Pos.	Nation	Player
—	MF	(Italy) ITA	Francesco Di Tacchio (at Ascoli until 30 June 2024, on loan from Ternana)
—	MF	(Ghana) GHA	Shaka Mawuli (at Arezzo until 30 June 2024)

== Transfers ==
=== In ===
Pos.	Player	Transferred from	Fee	Date	Source

=== Out ===
Pos.	Player	Transferred to	Fee	Date	Source

== Competitions ==
=== Overall record ===
Competition	First match	Last match	Starting round	Final position	Record							
Competition	First match	Last match	Starting round	Final position	Pld	W	D	L	GF	GA	GD	Win %
Serie B	20 August 2023	10 May 2024	Matchday 1		35	11	10	14	40	42	−2	31.43
Coppa Italia	14 August 2023		Round of 64	Round of 64	1	0	1	0	1	1	+0	0.00
Total					36	11	11	14	41	43	−2	30.56

Last updated: 27 April 2024
Source: Competitions

=== Serie B ===
==== League table ====
Pos	Team	Pld	W	D	L	GF	GA	GD	Pts
10	Modena	38	10	17	11	41	47	−6	47 (Note: Head-to-head points: Cosenza 11, Modena 11, Reggiana 7, Südtirol 3. Head-to-head goal difference: Cosenza +6, Modena +2.)
11	Reggiana	38	10	17	11	38	45	−7	47
12	Südtirol	38	12	11	15	46	48	−2	47
13	Pisa	38	11	13	14	51	54	−3	46 (Note: Pisa finished ahead of Cittadella on head-to-head points: Pisa 2–1 Cittadella, Cittadella 0–1 Pisa.)
14	Cittadella	38	11	13	14	40	47	−7	46

Source: Soccerway (in English)
Rules for classification: 1) Points; 2) Head-to-head points; 3) Head-to-head goal difference; 4) Goal difference; 5) Goals scored; 6) Draw.
(Note: Head-to-head record is used only after all the matches between the teams in question have been played)

==== Results summary ====
Overall								Home						Away					
Pld	W	D	L	GF	GA	GD	Pts	W	D	L	GF	GA	GD	W	D	L	GF	GA	GD
35	11	10	14	40	42	−2	43	6	5	6	19	17	+2	5	5	8	21	25	−4

Last updated: 27 April 2024.

==== Results by round ====
Round	1	2	3	4	5	6	7	8	9	10	11	12	13	14	15	16	17	18	19	20	21	22	23	24	25	26	27	28	29	30	31	32	33	34	35
Ground	H	A	H	H	A	A	H	A	H	A	H	A	H	A	H	A	A	H	A	H	A	H	A	H	A	H	A	H	A	H	A	H	A	H	A
Result	D	W	D	W	D	D	D	L	L	W	W	L	L	L	L	L	W	L	L	W	D	L	W	L	D	W	D	W	L	W	L	D	W	D	L
Position	8	5	6	5	6	7	7	8	10	7	7	8	11	11	13	14	12	14	15	12	13	15	12	14	14	12	12	10	13	9	12	12	11	11	

Updated to match(es) played on 27 April 2024. Source:
A = Away; H = Home; W = Win; D = Draw; L = Loss

==== Matches ====
The league fixtures were unveiled on 11 July 2023.

20 August 2023 1	Südtirol	3–3	Spezia	Bolzano
18:00 CEST (UTC+2)				Stadium: Stadio Druso

26 August 2023 2	Feralpisalò	0–2	Südtirol	Piacenza
20:30 CEST (UTC+2)				Stadium: Stadio Leonardo Garilli

2 September 2023 4	Südtirol	3–1	Ascoli	Bolzano
18:30 CEST (UTC+2)				Stadium: Stadio Druso

16 September 2023 5	Cosenza	2–2	Südtirol	Cosenza
14:00 CEST (UTC+2)				Stadium: Stadio San Vito-Gigi Marulla

23 September 2023 6	Ternana	1–1	Südtirol	Terni
14:00 CEST (UTC+2)				Stadium: Stadio Libero Liberati

26 September 2023 7	Südtirol	0–0	Modena	Bolzano
20:30 CEST (UTC+2)				Stadium: Stadio Druso

1 October 2023 8	Palermo	2–1	Südtirol	Palermo
16:15 CEST (UTC+2)				Stadium: Stadio Renzo Barbera

7 October 2023 9	Südtirol	0–1	Catanzaro	Bolzano
14:00 CEST (UTC+2)				Stadium: Stadio Druso

21 October 2023 10	Cremonese	0–1	Südtirol	Cremona
14:00 CEST (UTC+2)				Stadium: Stadio Giovanni Zini

28 October 2023 11	Südtirol	3–1	Sampdoria	Bolzano
14:00 CEST (UTC+2)				Stadium: Stadio Druso

5 November 2023 12	Parma	2–0	Südtirol	Parma
16:15 CET (UTC+1)	Bonny 9'; Man 57' (pen.)			Stadium: Stadio Ennio Tardini

24 February 2024 26	Südtirol	1–0	Bari	Bolzano
14:00 CET (UTC+2)				Stadium: Stadio Druso

27 February 2024 27	Reggiana	1–1	Südtirol	Reggio Emilia
18:15 CET (UTC+2)				Stadium: Mapei Stadium – Città del Tricolore

2 March 2024 28	Südtirol	1–0	Lecco	Bolzano
14:00 CET (UTC+2)	Tait 90+2'			Stadium: Stadio Druso; Referee: Alberto Santoro

27 April 2024 35	Modena	1–0	Südtirol	Modena
14:00 CEST (UTC+2)	Zaro 67'			Stadium: Stadio Alberto Braglia; Referee: Daniele Minelli

1 May 2024 36	Südtirol	v	Ternana	Bolzano
15:00				Stadium: Stadio Druso

10 May 2024 38	Südtirol	v	Palermo	Bolzano
20:30				Stadium: Stadio Druso
