= Frédéric Veseli =

Albanian footballer (born 1992)

Personal information
- Full name: Frédéric Shtjefan Veseli
- Date of birth: 20 November 1992 (age 33)
- Place of birth: Renens, Switzerland
- Height: 1.83 m (6 ft 0 in)
- Position: Defender

Team information
- Current team: Livorno
- Number: 34

Youth career
- 2003–2005: Renens
- 2005–2008: Lausanne-Sport
- 2008–2010: Manchester City

Senior career*
Years	Team	Apps	(Gls)
2010–2012	Manchester City	0	(0)
2012–2013	Manchester United	0	(0)
2013–2015	Ipswich Town	0	(0)
2014	→ Bury (loan)	18	(0)
2014	→ Port Vale (loan)	15	(0)
2015	Port Vale	22	(1)
2015–2016	Lugano	33	(0)
2016–2020	Empoli	96	(0)
2020	→ Le Mans (loan)	5	(0)
2020–2022	Salernitana	32	(1)
2022–2023	Benevento	21	(0)
2023–2024	Fatih Karagümrük	22	(0)
2024–2025	Egnatia	8	(0)
2025–2026	Südtirol	43	(0)
2026–	Livorno	4	(0)

International career
2007	Switzerland U15	4	(0)
2007–2008	Switzerland U16	8	(0)
2008–2009	Switzerland U17	16	(0)
2009–2010	Switzerland U18	12	(0)
2010–2011	Switzerland U19	9	(0)
2011–2012	Switzerland U20	7	(1)
2012	Switzerland U21	1	(0)
2015–2023	Albania	44	(0)
Medal record
Switzerland
FIFA U-17 World Cup
Winner	2009
- * Club domestic league appearances and goals as of 26 September 2026

Frédéric Shtjefan Veseli (Albanian: Frederik Shtjefan Veseli; born 20 November 1992), also known as Freddie Veseli, is a professional footballer who plays as a defender for Serie C Group B club Livorno and the Albania national team. His main position is centre-back, but he can also play at right-back and left-back.

Born in Renens, Switzerland, to Albanian parents, Veseli began his youth career with local club FC Renens before joining Lausanne-Sport in 2005. In 2008, he was signed by the English club Manchester City before joining rivals Manchester United in January 2012. Having failed to break into the first team, he was released in July 2013 and joined Ipswich Town, who allowed him to go on loan to Bury in the second half of the 2013–14 season. He was loaned out to Port Vale for the first half of the 2014–15 season before joining permanently in January 2015. He returned to Switzerland in July 2015 and joined Lugano, and featured on the losing side in the 2016 Swiss Cup final before he signed with Italian side Empoli in August 2016. He served Empoli as vice-captain as the club secured promotion as champions of Serie B in the 2017–18 campaign. He joined French club Le Mans on loan in January 2020 and then signed with Salernitana eight months later. He helped Salernitana to win promotion out of Serie B at the end of the 2020–21 season. He signed with Benevento in August 2022 and moved on to Turkish club Fatih Karagümrük 12 months later. He returned to Italy to play for Livorno in September 2026.

He represented Switzerland at every level of youth football and captained the Switzerland under-17s to victory in the 2009 FIFA U-17 World Cup. After refusing call-ups from Kosovo, in November 2015, he accepted the Albania national team's invitation to continue his international career and was named in the squad for UEFA Euro 2016.

== Early and personal life ==
Veseli was born in Switzerland to Albanian parents from Kosovo and speaks fluent English, French, Albanian and Italian. His father settled the family in Lausanne and worked in construction before joining a multi-national company that made plastic packaging. Veseli achieved the top grades in his school's region at the age of 15. Following Albania's historic participation at UEFA Euro 2016, Veseli was among the members of the national team who were issued diplomatic passports by the Albanian government in recognition of their achievement. In 2022, he was living with his partner, an accountant from Switzerland.

== Club career ==
=== Early career ===
Veseli started his football career with Renens. In 2005, he joined Lausanne-Sport, where he remained until 2008 when he moved to England to join Manchester City's Elite Development Squad. He would spend the next four seasons playing primarily for the reserve team. During the 2010–11 season, manager Roberto Mancini named Veseli in the first-team squad for the League Cup Third round match against West Bromwich Albion on 22 September, where he was an unused substitute for the entire game. Mancini promised to give him his Premier League debut on the final day of the 2010–11 season. However, Veseli tore his hamstring and was unable to play. Before the 2011–12 season, Veseli featured prominently at the 2011 World Football Challenge but did not make any first-team appearance that year. He demanded a contract of £5,000 a week, which City refused to give. He was approached by René Meulensteen, a coach under Alex Ferguson at City's local rivals Manchester United. Brian Marwood had wanted to demonstrate to the City players that the City Football Group could not be forced into offering more generous terms than they were willing to give.

On 31 January 2012, the last day of the 2012 winter transfer window, Veseli joined Manchester United on a free transfer. However, he failed to break into the first-team at Old Trafford and Manchester United released Veseli at the end of his contract in July 2013.

=== Ipswich Town ===
In July 2013, Veseli was signed by Mick McCarthy's Championship club Ipswich Town on a two-year deal. On 6 August, Veseli made his professional debut in a 2–0 League Cup defeat by Stevenage at Broadhall Way. However, he was unsuited to McCarthy's long ball style of play.

On 31 December 2013, Veseli had signed a one-month loan deal for struggling League Two side Bury. His loan spell at Gigg Lane was later extended by a further month before finally being extended to the full 93-day period. He started 18 league games for the club. He was influential in their rise from 20th in the table and fighting relegation up to 11th when he left after new manager David Flitcroft decided to include Veseli in a back three alongside Pablo Mills and Jimmy McNulty. In his 18 appearances, the "Shakers" kept ten clean sheets.

=== Port Vale ===
In July 2014, Veseli signed on loan for League One side Port Vale for the first half of the 2014–15 season, with manager Micky Adams intending him to provide first-team competition for right-back Adam Yates. He missed two weeks after breaking his ribs in September. He returned to the starting eleven at centre-back on 15 November, helping the "Valiants" to a 1–0 win over Rochdale at Vale Park. He was picked out as the star player in the following week's 1–0 defeat to Milton Keynes Dons. He joined Port Vale on a permanent basis on 7 January 2015, after being released by Ipswich. On 21 February, he scored his first goal in professional football with a speculative effort from 30 yards (27 m) in a 3–0 home win over Doncaster Rovers. The goal helped him to be named in the English Football League team of the week. He was offered a new contract of £1,000-a-week, but turned it down.

=== Lugano ===
In July 2015, Veseli rejected a contract offer from Port Vale and instead signed a 12-month deal with Swiss Super League side Lugano following a successful two-week trial. He played 33 of the club's 36 league games in the 2015–16 season, as Lugano avoided relegation by finishing just one point above bottom club FC Zürich. Lugano also reached the final of the Swiss Cup at Letzigrund, where Veseli was sent off in stoppage time after receiving two yellow cards in a 1–0 defeat to Zürich. He rejected the club's contract offer of 7,000-Swiss francs-a-month and the club unsuccessfully sued him, which prevented him from playing professional football until October 2016.

=== Empoli ===
Vesli signed a two-year contract with Serie A club Empoli in August 2016. He played 17 games for the "Azzurri", but was an unused substitute on the last day of the 2016–17 as Empoli were relegated with a 2–1 defeat at Palermo. Following the club's relegation, Veseli was one of only three survivors of a cull to the playing squad and was named as a vice-captain. On 25 August 2017, he renewed his contract with Empoli until 30 June 2021. He made 30 appearances across the 2017–18 campaign as Empoli made an immediate return to the top-flight as champions of Serie B under the stewardship of Aurelio Andreazzoli. He then featured 31 times in Serie A during the 2018–19 campaign as Empoli were relegated on the final day of the season. On 31 January 2020, he joined French Ligue 2 club Le Mans on loan. The 2019–20 Ligue 2 season was suspended indefinitely on 12 March and was eventually abandoned due to the COVID-19 pandemic in France.

=== Salernitana ===
On 26 August 2020, he signed a two-year contract with Serie B club Salernitana. He played 23 league games in the 2020–21 season, scoring one goal, as Fabrizio Castori's Salernitana secured promotion into Serie A with a second-place finish in Serie B. However, it was a difficult season on a personal level as he injured his knee, his calf, fractured his ankle and contracted COVID-19 throughout the campaign. He played nine games as Salernitana managed to avoid relegation in the 2021–22 season, with all but one of his appearances coming under Stefano Colantuono, who succeeded Castori as head coach in October only to be replaced by Davide Nicola in February.

=== Benevento ===
On 27 August 2022, Veseli moved to Benevento in Serie B. He featured 21 times in the 2022–23 campaign as Benevento were relegated in last place.

=== Fatih Karagümrük ===
On 23 July 2023, Veseli joined Süper Lig club Fatih Karagümrük on a two-year deal.

=== Egnatia ===
On 15 October 2024, he signed a contract with Kategoria Superiore champions Egnatia to run until 2026. He played eight games in what transpired to be a three-month spell.

=== Südtirol ===
On 5 January 2025, Veseli moved to Südtirol in Serie B on an 18-month contract. He featured 16 times in the second half of the 2024–25 season. He played 29 games in the 2025–26 season, including both legs of the relegation play-out tie with Bari.

=== Livorno ===
On 1 September 2026, Veseli joined Livorno in Serie C.

== International career ==
In May 2009, Veseli reached the semi-finals of the UEFA European Under-17 Championship, which was held in Germany. In October 2009, he competed in the FIFA U-17 World Cup, which was held in Nigeria, playing in six matches and eventually winning the competition as captain with a 1–0 victory over the hosts at the Abuja Stadium.

Although he has Swiss citizenship, Veseli declared to the media that he would welcome a call-up from Albania, given his Albanian ethnicity. He had also been contacted several times by Kosovo coach Albert Bunjaki, but refused to commit himself to Kosovo.

=== Albania ===
On 7 November 2015, Veseli received his first call-up to Albania by coach Gianni De Biasi for the friendly matches against Kosovo and Georgia on 13 and 16 November 2015. He made his first appearance against Kosovo as a substitute in the 63rd minute for Berat Djimsiti. He formally secured Albanian citizenship in May 2016.

==== Euro 2016 ====
On 21 May 2016, Veseli was named in Albania's preliminary 27-man squad for UEFA Euro 2016, and in Albania's final 23-man UEFA Euro 2016 squad on 31 May. He appeared as an 86th-minute substitute against hosts France in Albania's second group game, which ended in a 2–0 defeat. Albania finished the group in the third position with three points and with a goal difference –2, and was ranked last in the third-placed teams, which eventually eliminated them.

== Style of play ==
Speaking in July 2014, Port Vale manager Micky Adams stated that Veseli was "quick, he can handle the ball and he's got decent pedigree".

== Career statistics ==
=== Club ===
As of match played 22 May 2026

Appearances and goals by club, season and competition
Club	Season	League			National cup (Note: Includes FA Cup, Swiss Cup, Coppa Italia, Turkish Cup, Albanian Cup)		Other		Total	
Club	Season	Division	Apps	Goals	Apps	Goals	Apps	Goals	Apps	Goals
Manchester City	2010–11	Premier League	0	0	0	0	0	0	0	0
Manchester City	2011–12	Premier League	0	0	0	0	0	0	0	0
Manchester City	Total		0	0	0	0	0	0	0	0
Manchester United	2011–12	Premier League	0	0	0	0	0	0	0	0
Manchester United	2012–13	Premier League	0	0	0	0	0	0	0	0
Manchester United	Total		0	0	0	0	0	0	0	0
Ipswich Town	2013–14	Championship	0	0	—		1 (Note: Appearance in the Football League Cup)	0	1	0
Bury (loan)	2013–14	League Two	18	0	—		—		18	0
Port Vale (loan)	2014–15	League One	37	1	—		1	0	38	1
Lugano	2015–16	Swiss Super League	33	0	5	0	—		38	0
Empoli	2016–17	Serie A	17	0	—		—		17	0
Empoli	2017–18	Serie B	30	0	1	0	—		31	0
Empoli	2018–19	Serie A	31	0	0	0	—		31	0
Empoli	2019–20	Serie B	18	0	3	0	—		21	0
Empoli	Total		96	0	4	0	—		100	0
Le Mans (loan)	2019–20	Ligue 2	5	0	—		—		5	0
Salernitana	2020–21	Serie B	23	1	0	0	—		23	1
Salernitana	2021–22	Serie A	9	0	0	0	—		9	0
Salernitana	2022–23	Serie A	0	0	0	0	—		0	0
Salernitana	Total		32	1	0	0	—		32	1
Benevento	2022–23	Serie B	21	0	0	0	—		21	0
Fatih Karagümrük	2023–24	Süper Lig	22	0	4	0	—		26	0
Egnatia	2024–25	Kategoria Superiore	8	0	0	0	—		8	0
Südtirol	2024–25	Serie B	16	0	0	0	—		16	0
Südtirol	2025–26	Serie B	27	0	0	0	2 (Note: Appearance in the play-offs)	0	29	0
Südtirol	Total		43	0	0	0	2	0	45	0
Livorno	2026–27	Serie C	0	0	0	0	—		0	0
Career total			315	2	13	0	4	0	332	2

=== International ===
As of match played 17 October 2023

Appearances and goals by national team and year
National team	Year	Apps	Goals
Albania	2015	2	0
Albania	2016	3	0
Albania	2017	6	0
Albania	2018	7	0
Albania	2019	8	0
Albania	2020	6	0
Albania	2021	6	0
Albania	2022	5	0
Albania	2023	1	0
Total		44	0

== Honours ==
Lugano

- Swiss Cup runner-up: 2015–16

Empoli

- Serie B: 2017–18

Salernitana

- Serie B second-place promotion: 2020–21

Switzerland U17

- FIFA U-17 World Cup: 2009
