= Jacopo Martini =

Italian footballer (born 2004)

Personal information
- Date of birth: 28 December 2004 (age 21)
- Place of birth: Verona, Italy
- Height: 1.86 m (6 ft 1 in)
- Position: Midfielder

Team information
- Current team: Carrarese
- Number: 28

Youth career
- –2021: Chievo
- 2021–2023: Inter Milan
- 2021–2022: → SPAL (loan)

Senior career*
Years	Team	Apps	(Gls)
2023–2024	Inter Milan	0	(0)
2023–2024	→ Foggia (loan)	27	(0)
2024–2026	Südtirol	45	(2)
2026–	Carrarese	4	(0)
- * Club domestic league appearances and goals as of 19 September 2026

Jacopo Martini (born 28 December 2004) is an Italian professional footballer who plays as a midfielder for Serie B club Carrarese.

== Club career ==
Martini started his career at Chievo, before joining Inter Milan's youth setup in 2021. During the 2021–22 season, he was loaned to SPAL, where he helped the team secure the under-18 championship title.

On 4 August 2023, Martini made his first professional move, joining Serie C club Foggia on a season-long loan.

On 11 July 2024, Martini joined Serie B team Südtirol on a permanent transfer, signing a three-year contract.

== Career statistics ==
As of match played 13 May 2025

Appearances and goals by club, season and competition
Club	Season	League			National cup		League cup		Continental		Other		Total	
Club	Season	Division	Apps	Goals	Apps	Goals	Apps	Goals	Apps	Goals	Apps	Goals	Apps	Goals
Foggia (loan)	2023–24	Serie C	27	0	1	0	1 (Note: Appearance Coppa Italia Serie C)	1	—		—		29	1
Südtirol	2024–25	Serie B	22	0	0	0	—		—		—		22	0
Career total			49	0	1	0	1	1	0	0	0	0	51	1
