= Lorenzo Lonardi =

Italian footballer (born 1999)

Personal information
- Date of birth: 10 February 1999 (age 27)
- Place of birth: Verona, Italy
- Height: 1.87 m (6 ft 2 in)
- Position: Midfielder

Team information
- Current team: Ravenna
- Number: 17

Youth career
- GSD Ambrosiana
- 2015–2016: → Hellas Verona (loan)

Senior career*
Years	Team	Apps	(Gls)
2016–2020	GSD Ambrosiana	80	(0)
2020	Milano City	2	(0)
2020–2023	Virtus Verona	109	(6)
2023–2025	Südtirol	14	(0)
2024–2025	→ Pescara (loan)	7	(0)
2025–	Ravenna	30	(0)
- * Club domestic league appearances and goals as of 30 April 2026

Lorenzo Lonardi (born 10 February 1999) is an Italian professional footballer who plays as a midfielder for Serie C Group B club Ravenna.

== Club career ==
Born in Verona, Lonardi started his career in Serie D club GSD Ambrosiana.

In 2020, he joined Serie C club Virtus Verona. Lonardi made his professional debut on 27 September 2020 against Cesena. He extended his contract the next season.

On 23 June 2023, Lonardi joined Serie B club Südtirol on three-year contract. On 21 August 2024, he was loaned by Pescara.

On 5 August 2025, Lonardi signed a two-season contract with Ravenna in Serie C.
