= Silvio Merkaj =

Albanian footballer (born 1997)

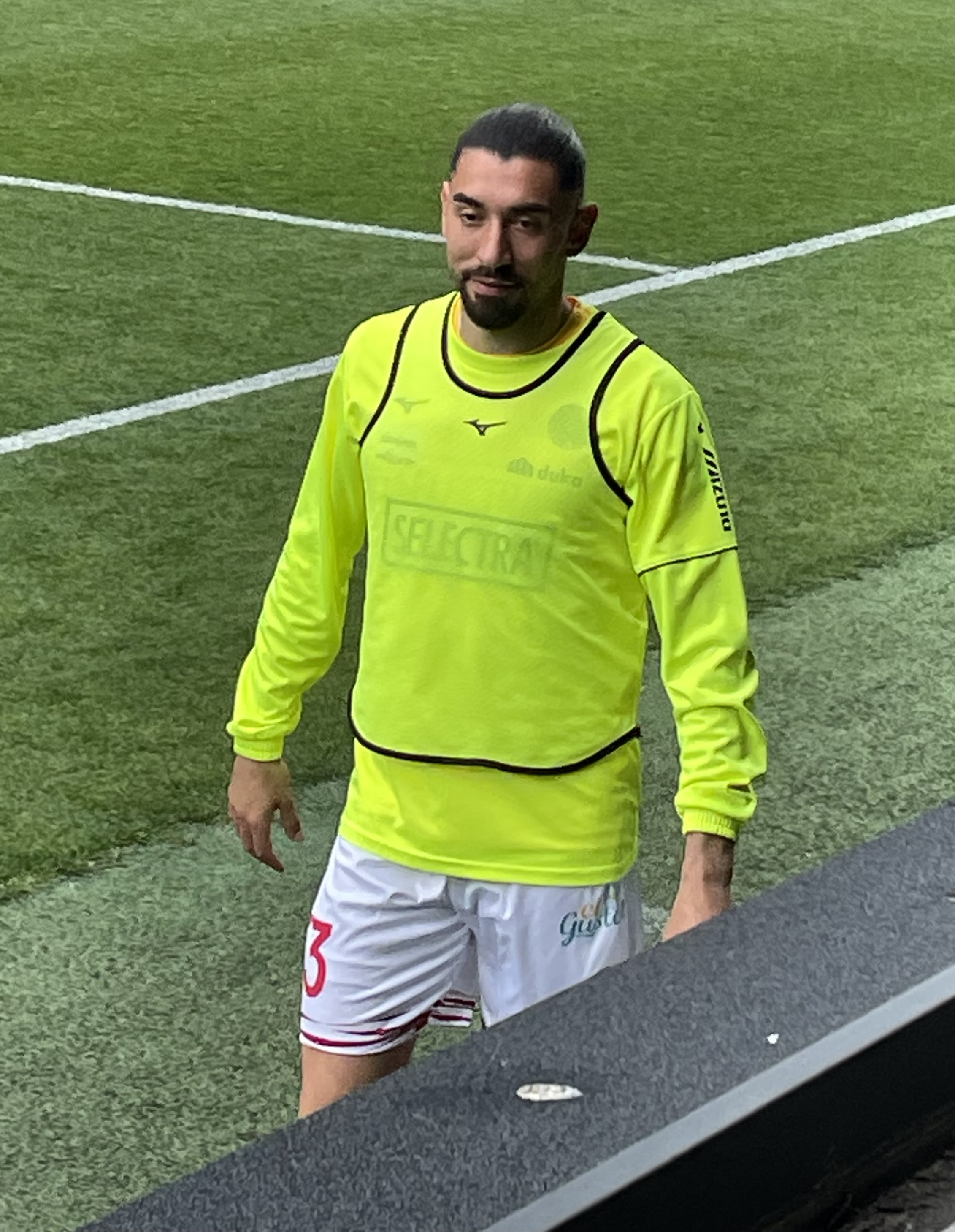

Personal information
- Date of birth: 4 December 1997 (age 28)
- Place of birth: Vlorë, Albania
- Height: 1.88 m (6 ft 2 in)
- Position: Striker

Team information
- Current team: Vicenza
- Number: 33

Senior career*
Years	Team	Apps	(Gls)
2015–2016	Flamurtari Vlorë	27	(11)
2016–2017	Foligno	12	(4)
2017	Castel del Piano	12	(4)
2017–2018	Igea Virtus	30	(3)
2018–2019	Gelbison	32	(8)
2019–2020	Bitonto	20	(1)
2020–2021	Vastogirardi	32	(14)
2021–2023	Entella	80	(30)
2023–2026	Südtirol	106	(21)
2026–	Vicenza	3	(1)
- * Club domestic league appearances and goals as of 20 September 2026

Silvio Merkaj (born 4 December 1997) is an Albanian professional footballer who plays as a striker for Serie B club Vicenza.

== Life and career ==
In 2015, Merkaj signed for Italian side Castel del Piano. In 2016, he signed for Italian side Foligno. In 2017, he returned to Italian side Castel del Piano. After that, he signed for Italian side Igea Virtus. In 2018, he signed for Italian side Gelbison. In 2019, he signed for Italian side Bitonto. In 2020, he signed for Italian side Vastogirardi. In 2021, Merkaj signed for Italian side Entella. On 12 August 2023, Merkaj signed a three-year contract with Serie B side Südtirol.

Merkaj was born on 4 December 1997 in Vlorë, Albania. Merkaj moved from Albania to Italy with his family at the age of four. He grew up in Umbria, Italy. He has regarded Ukraine international Andriy Shevchenko as his football idol.

== Style of play ==
Merkaj mainly operates as a striker. He is right-footed.
