= Simone Tronchin =

Italian footballer

Personal information
- Date of birth: 17 October 2002 (age 24)
- Place of birth: Montebelluna, Italy
- Height: 1.83 m (6 ft 0 in)
- Position: Midfielder

Team information
- Current team: Südtirol
- Number: 18

Youth career
- Montebelluna

Senior career*
Years	Team	Apps	(Gls)
2019–2020	Montebelluna	22	(2)
2020–2024	Vicenza	25	(0)
2021–2023	→ Virtus Verona (loan)	49	(2)
2024–2025	Cittadella	23	(2)
2025–	Südtirol	34	(1)
- * Club domestic league appearances and goals as of 12 May 2026

Simone Tronchin (born 17 October 2002) is an Italian footballer who plays as a midfielder for Serie B club Südtirol.

== Club career ==
He started his senior career in Serie D with Montebelluna. On 12 August 2020, he joined the Under-19 squad of Serie B club Vicenza. He began to receive call-ups to the senior squad in late November 2020.

He made his Serie B debut for Vicenza on 4 January 2021 in a game against Brescia, he substituted Jacopo Da Riva in the 89th minute.

On 15 July 2021, he joined Virtus Verona on loan.

On 14 June 2024 he joined Cittadella.

On 17 July 2025, Tronchin moved to Südtirol for three years.
