= Andrea Masiello =

Italian footballer (born 1986)

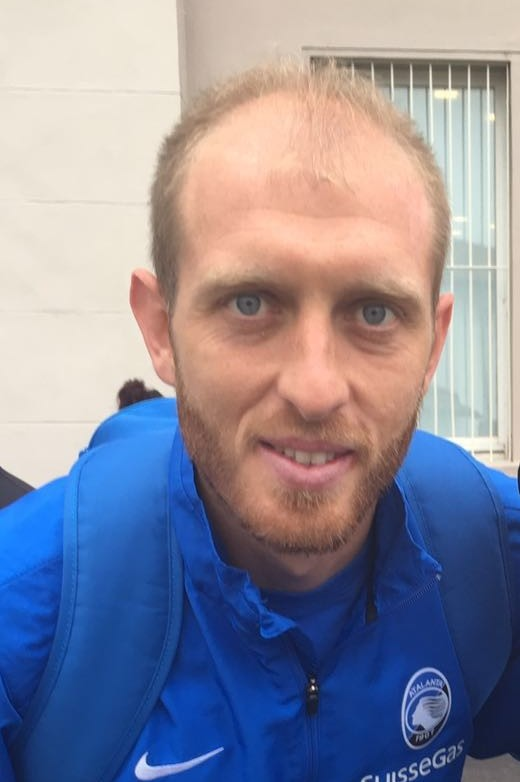
- Masiello with Atalanta in 2016

Personal information
- Date of birth: 5 February 1986 (age 40)
- Place of birth: Viareggio, Italy
- Height: 1.85 m (6 ft 1 in)
- Positions: Right back; centre back

Youth career
- Lucchese
- 2003–2005: Juventus

Senior career*
Years	Team	Apps	(Gls)
2003	Lucchese	2	(0)
2005–2006	Juventus	1	(0)
2005–2006	→ Avellino (loan)	39	(1)
2006–2007	Siena	0	(0)
2007–2008	Genoa	19	(1)
2008	→ Bari (loan)	20	(0)
2008–2011	Bari	113	(3)
2011–2020	Atalanta	157	(8)
2020–2022	Genoa	52	(0)
2022–2026	Südtirol	97	(2)
Total		500	(15)

International career
2004	Italy U18	2	(0)
2004–2005	Italy U19	16	(0)
2005–2006	Italy U20	3	(0)
- * Club domestic league appearances and goals

Andrea Masiello (born 5 February 1986) is an Italian former professional footballer who played as a centre-back. He was banned for 26 months for match-fixing, including in the Derby of Puglia, whilst playing for Bari, scoring an own goal to guarantee Lecce survival in Serie A.

== Career ==
=== Juventus ===
A graduate of Juventus' youth system, he made his Serie A debut for Juve, in a home defeat Inter, on 20 April 2005. Masiello joined Juventus on loan in 2003 from Lucchese and in January 2004, he turned to a co-ownership deal for €300,000. In June 2004 Juventus acquired him outright.

Masiello was on loan to Avellino of Serie B in 2005, along with Boudianski, where he played 41 times. Avellino were involved in the Serie B relegation playoffs, losing to AlbinoLeffe 4–3 on aggregate.

=== Siena & Genoa ===
In the wake of the 2006 Italian football scandal Juve were forced to play in Serie B. Thus, the squad faced clearance in order to improve the financial condition. Masiello, along with Abdoulay Konko and Giovanni Bartolucci were now joint-owned by Siena and Juventus, which valued Masiello at €350,000, Konko at €500,000 and Bartolucci for a peppercorn fee of €500.

After failing to make an appearance in the first half of the 2006 season, Juventus sold 50% of its ownership of Masiello and Konko to Genoa on 25 January 2007, (which were previously owned by Siena and Juventus, after Genoa and Siena) worth €1.25 million (Masiello) and €1 million (Konko) respectively, for part of the deal of the permanent transfer of Domenico Criscito. He played 15 times and won promotion along with his teammate.

Genoa and Siena were failed to make an agreement for the two players before the deadline, thus they had to submit a bid to Lega Calcio. Eventually Genoa acquired Masiello for €1.08 million and Siena acquired Konko outright for €823,787. However, in July Genoa acquired Konko outright for €1.2 million (with Fernando Forestieri moved to Siena for €1.7 million in co-ownership deal), but after playing 4 times for the club, he went back to Serie B to play for Bari on loan.

=== Bari ===
Masiello joined Bari in a co-ownership bid after the 2007–08 season, for €1.5 million. He was part of the team that won Serie B in 2009, so the club decided to buy him outright for another €800,000. After the season-ending injury of Andrea Ranocchia, he moved to centre-back from right-back. Masiello was a regular starter in the 2009–10 Serie A season.

After the departure of Ranocchia and Leonardo Bonucci, Bari failed to sign quality replacements. At first, he was the centre-back, as the team signed right-back Andrea Raggi, but in mid-season he was moved back to right-back. In January 2011 Bari signed centre-back Kamil Glik and after the departure of coach Giampiero Ventura, Masiello remained as the starting right-back and Nicola Belmonte became the usual centre-back under Bortolo Mutti. As Bari performed poorly in both attack and defence, the team finished bottom and were relegated to Serie B.

On 15 May 2011, in the 70th minute of the derby between Bari and Lecce, he deflected a shot from Lecce striker Jeda, into his own goal, thus ensuring Lecce's victory and survival in the Serie A. He later admitted to interviewers that he was offered at least €50,000 to turn the ball into his own net.

=== Atalanta ===
On 25 July 2011, Bari agreed to sell Masiello to Atalanta B.C. for €2.5 million cash plus Marino Defendi (tagged for €1 million). Bari also retained 50% registration rights of Masiello. He was presented on the next day. He scored his first goal for the club in a 2–2 draw with Fiorentina. After the exposure of the betting scandal, Masiello was released by the club, but returned shortly after. Over the next few years Masiello cemented himself as a starting centre-back for Atalanta under Gian Piero Gasperini, leading them to a historic 3rd-place finish in the 2018–19 season, earning them qualification to the 2019–2020 Champions League Group Stage. One of Masiello's most important contributions to the season came on 22 April 2019 against Napoli where he made an incredible goal line clearance in the 50th minute to keep the game at 1–0 for Napoli. Atalanta would go on to win that game 2–1 earning Atalanta three vital points in their push for a top four finish.

=== Genoa return ===
On 29 January 2020, Masiello signed a deal with Genoa.

=== Südtirol ===
On 5 September 2022, Masiello joined Südtirol on a one-season contract.

== Career statistics ==
As of match played 18 August 2024

Appearances and goals by club, season and competition
Club	Season	League			National Cup (Note: Includes Coppa Italia)		Continental		Other		Total	
Club	Season	Division	Apps	Goals	Apps	Goals	Apps	Goals	Apps	Goals	Apps	Goals
Lucchese	2002–03	Serie C1	2	0	0	0	—		—		2	0
Juventus	2004–05	Serie A	1	0	0	0	—		—		1	0
Avellino (loan)	2005–06	Serie B	39	1	1	0	—		2 (Note: Appearance(s) in Serie B play-out)	0	42	1
Siena	2006–07	Serie A	0	0	0	0	—		—		0	0
Genoa	2006–07	Serie B	15	0	0	0	—		—		15	0
Genoa	2007–08	Serie A	4	1	0	0	—		—		4	1
Genoa	Total		19	1	0	0	0	0	0	0	19	1
Bari (loan)	2007–08	Serie B	20	0	0	0	—		—		20	0
Bari	2008–09	Serie B	40	0	2	0	—		—		42	0
Bari	2009–10	Serie A	37	2	1	0	—		—		38	2
Bari	2010–11	Serie A	36	1	3	1	—		—		39	2
Bari	Total		133	3	6	1	0	0	0	0	139	4
Atalanta	2011–12	Serie A	17	1	1	0	—		—		18	1
Atalanta	2014–15	Serie A	14	0	0	0	—		—		14	0
Atalanta	2015–16	Serie A	29	0	2	0	—		—		31	0
Atalanta	2016–17	Serie A	35	3	3	0	—		—		38	3
Atalanta	2017–18	Serie A	31	4	2	0	8 (Note: Appearance(s) in UEFA Europa League)	1	—		41	5
Atalanta	2018–19	Serie A	24	0	3	0	6	1	—		33	1
Atalanta	2019–20	Serie A	7	0	1	0	4 (Note: Appearance(s) in UEFA Champions League)	0	—		12	0
Atalanta	Total		157	8	12	0	18	2	0	0	187	10
Genoa	2019–20	Serie A	15	0	0	0	—		—		15	0
Genoa	2020–21	Serie A	30	0	2	0	—		—		32	0
Genoa	2021–22	Serie A	7	0	0	0	—		—		7	0
Genoa	Total		52	0	2	0	0	0	0	0	54	0
Südtirol	2022–23	Serie B	31	0	0	0	—		1 (Note: Appearance(s) in Serie B play-off)	0	32	0
Südtirol	2023–24	Serie B	34	2	1	0	—		—		35	2
Südtirol	Total		65	2	1	0	—		1	0	67	2
Career total			468	15	22	1	18	2	3	0	511	18

== Honours ==
Bari

- Serie B: 2008–09
