= Marco Frigerio =

Italian footballer

Personal information
- Full name: Marco Romano Frigerio
- Date of birth: 16 July 2001 (age 25)
- Place of birth: Carate Brianza, Italy
- Height: 1.85 m (6 ft 1 in)
- Position: Midfielder

Team information
- Current team: Union Brescia (on loan from Südtirol)
- Number: 26

Youth career
- AC Milan

Senior career*
Years	Team	Apps	(Gls)
2020–2022	AC Milan	0	(0)
2021–2022	→ Lucchese (loan)	33	(0)
2022–2024	Foggia	42	(5)
2024–2026	Lecco	45	(4)
2026–	Südtirol	18	(0)
2026–	→ Union Brescia (loan)	5	(0)
- * Club domestic league appearances and goals as of 27 September 2026

Marco Romano Frigerio (born 16 July 2001) is an Italian professional footballer who plays as a midfielder for Serie C Group A club Union Brescia on loan from Südtirol.

== Career ==
On 22 July 2022, Frigerio signed a two-year contract with Foggia.

On 18 January 2024, Frigerio moved to Lecco in Serie B.

On 2 January 2026, Frigerio signed a one-and-a-half-year contract with Südtirol.
