= Emanuele Pecorino =

Italian footballer (born 2001)

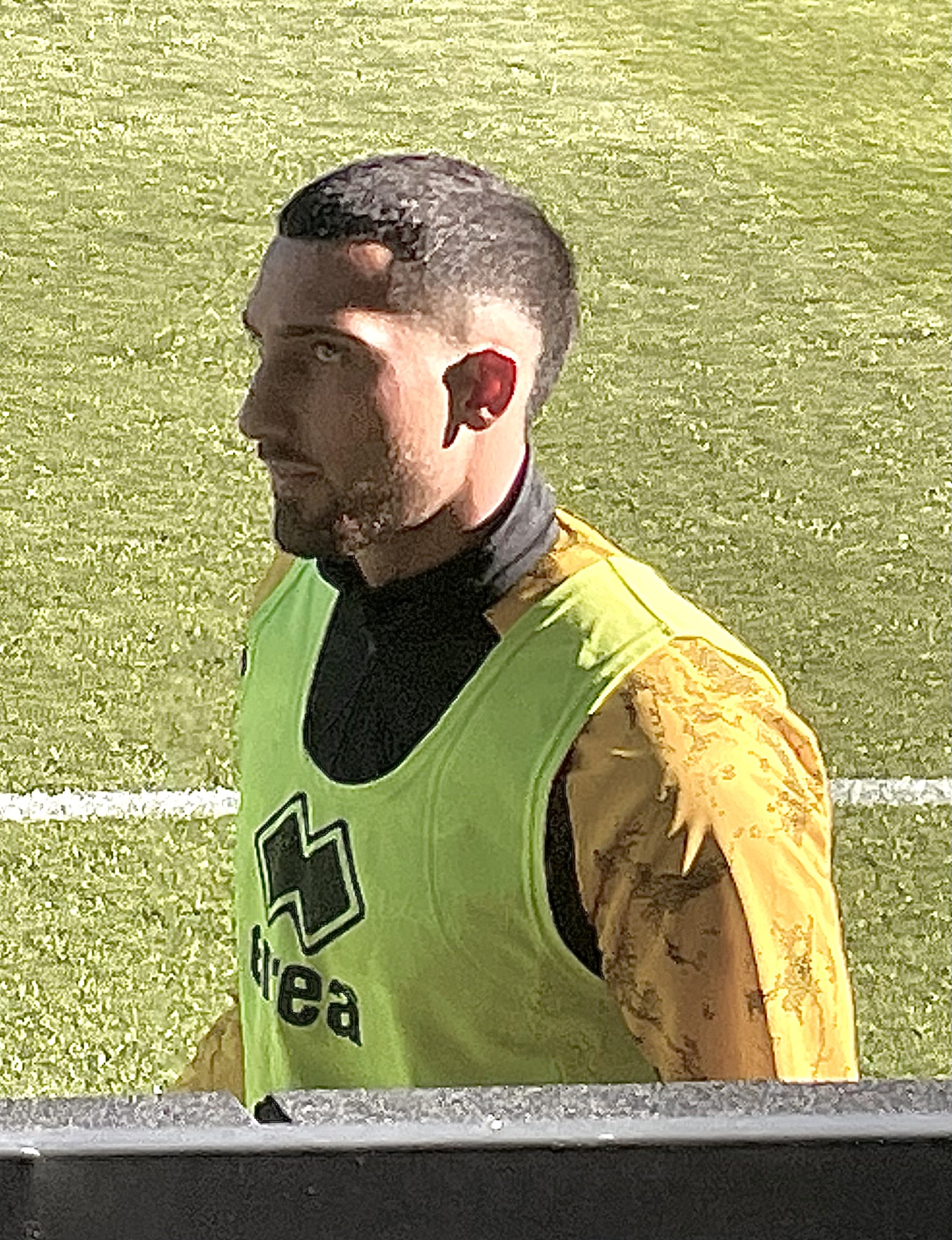
- Pecorino with Südtirol in 2025

Personal information
- Date of birth: 15 July 2001 (age 25)
- Place of birth: Catania, Italy
- Height: 1.91 m (6 ft 3 in)
- Position: Striker

Team information
- Current team: Catanzaro
- Number: 31

Youth career
- 2008–2010: Trinacria
- 2010–2020: Catania
- 2019: → AC Milan (loan)
- 2019–2020: → AC Milan (loan)

Senior career*
Years	Team	Apps	(Gls)
2019–2021	Catania	15	(5)
2021–2026	Juventus	0	(0)
2021–2023	→ Juventus Next Gen (Note: The team's name was changed from Juventus U23 to Juventus Next Gen in August 2022.) (res.)	50	(9)
2023–2024	→ Südtirol (loan)	26	(4)
2024–2025	→ Frosinone (loan)	20	(1)
2025–2026	→ Südtirol (loan)	33	(9)
2026–	Catanzaro	0	(0)

International career^{‡}
2021	Italy U20	1	(0)
- * Club domestic league appearances and goals as of 21 August 2026 ‡ National team caps and goals as of 20:11, 25 March 2022 (UTC)

Emanuele Pecorino (born 15 July 2001) is an Italian professional footballer who plays as a striker for Serie B club Catanzaro.

== Club career ==
=== Early career ===
Pecorino began his youth career at local academy Trinacria aged 6–7, before moving to Catania in 2010. In the 2018–19 season, Pecorino scored 18 goals for the under-19s. In March 2019, AC Milan took him on loan for the Torneo Di Viareggio youth tournament. He scored a goal in the round of 16, in which they were eliminated by Charles De Ketelaere's Club Brugge. He made his first-team debut for Catania on 7 April 2019, coming on in the 55th minute in a 2–1 win against Bisceglie; his 91st-minute header was saved on the goal line, with Andrea Esposito scoring from the rebound.

In summer 2019, Pecorino returned to Milan's youth setup on loan; he scored seven goals in 14 appearances in the Campionato Primavera 2 – nine in 18 in all competitions, helping his side gain promotion to the Campionato Primavera 1. Upon his return to Catania, he was integrated in the first team. His first game in 2020–21 was in the derby against Palermo, playing from the first minute and scoring the equalizer to help his team draw 1–1. Pecorino played the next seven games as a starter, scoring four more goals. Pecorino ended the first half of the season with five goals in 14 appearances (762 minutes).

=== Juventus ===
On 2 February 2021, Pecorino joined Serie C side Juventus U23 – the reserve team of Juventus – on a four-and-a-half-year contract. He made his debut two days later, coming on as a substitute in a 3–0 home defeat against Como. Pecorino's first Juventus U23 goal came on 7 February, as a substitute in a 6–0 home victory against Livorno. On the same day, he started to suffer an osteitis pubis.

Pecorino returned from his injury on 22 August, coming on as a substitute in a 3–2 Coppa Italia Serie C win against Pro Sesto in the 88th minute. Pecorino's first goal in the 2021–22 season came on 20 October, in a 2–2 away draw against AlbinoLeffe. On 14 December, he was operated on for an osteitis pubis again. Pecorino returned from injury on 13 February 2022, as a second-half substitute in a 3–0 win against Mantova. On 13 March, during a 1–0 defeat against Südtirol, Pecorino broke the radius of his right forearm.

On 3 September, Pecorino scored the second goal through a header in Juventus Next Gen's 2–0 victory to Trento on matchday 1. Towards late-January–early-February 2023, Pecorino scored four goals in three consecutive league matches; he scored one goal against Vicenza and Pergolettese and netted a brace against Piacenza. On 7 July 2023, he was loaned to Serie B side Südtirol, alongside his teammate Daouda Peeters.

==== Loan to Südtirol ====
On 7 July 2023, he joined Südtirol on loan.

==== Loan to Frosinone ====
On 9 August 2024, Pecorino joined Frosinone on loan with an option to buy and a conditional obligation to buy. On 5 April 2025, he scored his first goal for Frosinone — a 97th-minute header to draw 2–2 against Cosenza.

==== Loan return to Südtirol ====
On 11 July 2025, Pecorino returned to Südtirol on loan with an option to buy.

== Style of play ==
Pecorino is a left-footed striker known for his strength and holding play. He has good technique, and his height of 1.91 m (6 ft 3 in) helps him in aerial play.

== Career statistics ==
=== Club ===
As of match played 13 May 2025

Appearances and goals by club, season and competition
Club	Season	League			Coppa Italia		Other		Total	
Club	Season	Division	Apps	Goals	Apps	Goals	Apps	Goals	Apps	Goals
Catania	2018–19	Serie C	1	0	0	0	0	0	1	0
Catania	2019–20	Serie C	0	0	0	0	0	0	0	0
Catania	2020–21	Serie C	14	5	1	0	—		15	5
Catania	Total		15	5	1	0	0	0	16	5
Juventus Next Gen	2020–21	Serie C	2	1	—		0	0	2	1
Juventus Next Gen	2021–22	Serie C	22	2	—		3 (Note: Two appearances in Coppa Italia Serie C and one appearance in the Serie C promotion play-offs)	0	25	2
Juventus Next Gen	2022–23	Serie C	26	6	—		6 (Note: Appearances in Coppa Italia Serie C)	0	32	6
Juventus Next Gen	Total		50	9	0	0	9	0	59	9
Südtirol	2023–24	Serie B	26	4	0	0	0	0	26	4
Frosinone	2024–25	Serie B	20	1	1	0	0	0	21	2
Career total			111	19	2	0	9	0	122	19

=== International ===
Appearances and goals by national team, year and competition
Team	Year	Apps	Goals
Italy U20	2021	1	0
Career total		1	0
