= Cristian Shiba =

Albanian footballer (born 2001)

Personal information
- Date of birth: 31 January 2001 (age 25)
- Place of birth: San Benedetto del Tronto, Italy
- Height: 1.83 m (6 ft 0 in)
- Position: Right back

Team information
- Current team: San Marino

Youth career
- –2017: Maceratese
- 2017–2020: Sassuolo

Senior career*
Years	Team	Apps	(Gls)
2018–2019	→ Sangiustese (loan)	33	(0)
2020–2021	Ravenna	30	(0)
2021–2023	Pontedera	64	(1)
2023–2025	Südtirol	0	(0)
2024	→ Recanatese (loan)	16	(0)
2024–2025	→ Taranto (loan)	16	(2)
2025	→ Arzignano (loan)	11	(0)
2025–	San Marino	17	(1)

International career^{‡}
2019	Albania U19	5	(0)
- * Club domestic league appearances and goals as of 1 March 2026 ‡ National team caps and goals as of 19 November 2019

Cristian Shiba (born 31 January 2001) is an Albanian professional footballer who plays as a right back for Sammarinese club San Marino that plays in the Italian fourth-tier Serie D.

== Club career ==
Born in San Benedetto del Tronto, Shiba joined the Sassuolo youth sector on 17 August 2017.

On 4 May 2018, he was loaned to Serie D club Sangiustese.

For the 2020–21 season, he was loaned to Serie C club Ravenna. On 23 September 2020, he signed with the club. Shiba made his professional debut on 27 September against Südtirol.

On 6 July 2021, he signed with another Serie C club, Pontedera.

On 22 June 2023, he joined Serie B side Südtirol.

On 9 January 2024, he went to Serie C side Recanatese.

On 30 August 2024, Shiba was loaned to Serie C Group C club Taranto. On 10 January 2025, he moved on a new loan to Arzignano.

On 1 September 2025, Shiba's contract with Südtirol was terminated by mutual consent.

== International career ==
Shiba was a youth international for Albania.
