= Matteo Rover =

Italian footballer (born 1999)

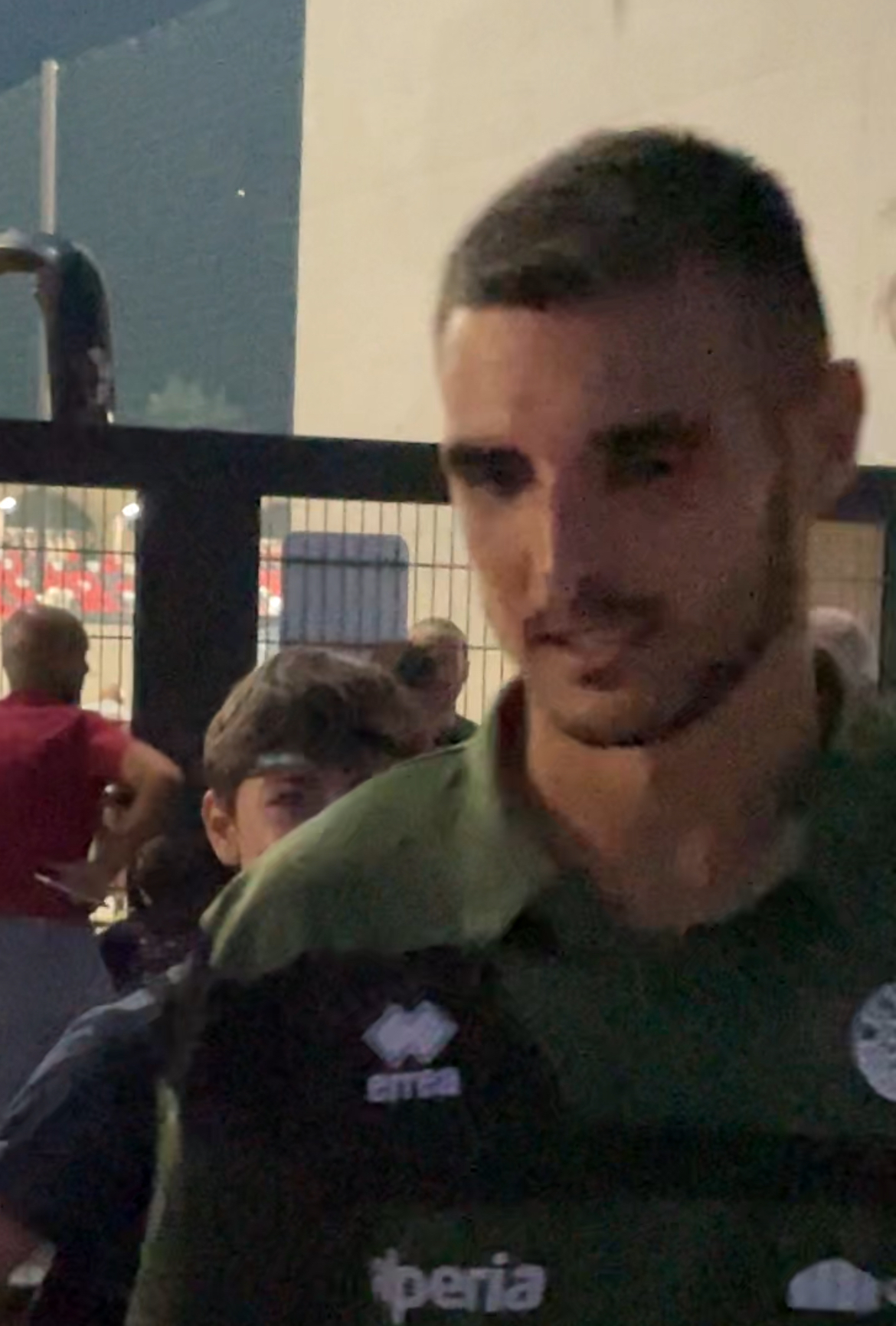

Personal information
- Date of birth: 20 February 1999 (age 27)
- Place of birth: Motta di Livenza, Italy
- Height: 1.86 m (6 ft 1 in)
- Position: Forward

Team information
- Current team: Reggiana
- Number: 23

Youth career
- –2015: Liventina
- 2015–2018: Internazionale

Senior career*
Years	Team	Apps	(Gls)
2018–	Internazionale	0	(0)
2018–2019	→ Vicenza Virtus (loan)	1	(0)
2019	→ Pordenone (loan)	13	(0)
2019–2020	→ Südtirol (loan)	26	(6)
2020–2025	Südtirol	155	(22)
2025–	Reggiana	32	(1)

International career
2017	Italy U18	3	(0)
- * Club domestic league appearances and goals as of 13 May 2026

Matteo Rover (born 20 February 1999) is an Italian professional footballer who plays as a forward for Serie C Group B club Reggiana.

== Club career ==
=== Internazionale ===
He appeared for the main squad of Inter in a preseason friendly in the summer of 2017.

==== Loan to Vicenza Virtus and Pordenone ====
On 21 August 2018, Rover joined to Serie C club Vicenza Virtus on loan for the 2018–19 season. On 7 October he made his professional debut for Vicenza Virtus in Serie C as a substitute replacing Stefano Giacomelli in the 77th minute of a 2–1 home win over Vis Pesaro. His loan was terminated during the 2018–19 season winter break leaving Vicenza Virtus with only one appearance.

On 11 January 2019, Rover was loaned to Serie C club Pordenone until the end of the season. Eight days later, on 19 January, he made his debut for Pordenone as a substitute replacing Davide Gavazzi in the 92nd minute of a 1–0 home win over AlbinoLeffe. On 5 May he played his first match as a starter for the club, a 2–2 away draw against FeralpiSalò, he was replaced by Gianvito Misuraca in the 64th minute. Rover ended his 6-month loan with 13 appearances, but only 1 as a starter.

==== Loan to Südtirol ====
On 15 July 2019, Rover was loaned to Serie C club Südtirol on a season-long loan deal. On 4 August he made his debut for the club in a 4–2 home win over Città di Fasano in the first round of Coppa Italia, he played the entire match. On 25 August he made his league debut for Südtirol as a substitute replacing Daniele Casiraghi in the 68th minute of a 2–1 away win over Vis Pesaro. One week later, on 1 September, Rover scored his first professional goal, as a substitute, in the 47th minute of a 3–2 home defeat against Carpi. On 21 September he played his first entire match for the club in Serie C, a 1–0 away win over Arzignano Valchiampo. Four days later, Rover scored his second goal, again as a substitute, in the 64th minute of a 3–0 home win over Fermana. Rover ended his loan with 30 appearances, 6 goals and 2 assists.

=== Südtirol ===
On 14 August 2020 he moved to Südtirol and signed contract until 2023. He made his seasonal debut, on 22 September, as a starter in the first round of Coppa Italia and he also scored his first goal in the 27th minute of a 2–1 home win over Latte Dolce, he played the entire match. Five days later, on 27 September, Rover made his league debut as a substitute replacing Daniele Casiraghi in the 64th minute of a 2–1 away win over Ravenna.

=== Reggiana ===
On 18 July 2025, Rover signed a two-year contract with Reggiana in Serie B.

== Career statistics ==
=== Club ===
As of 2 June 2021

Club	Season	League			Cup		Europe		Other		Total	
Club	Season	League	Apps	Goals	Apps	Goals	Apps	Goals	Apps	Goals	Apps	Goals
Vicenza Virtus (loan)	2018–19	Serie C	1	0	0	0	—		—		1	0
Pordenone (loan)	2018–19	Serie C	12	0	—		—		1 (Note: All appearance(s) in Supercoppa di Serie C.)	0	13	0
Südtirol (loan)	2019–20	Serie C	26	6	3	0	—		1 (Note: All appearance(s) in Serie C play-off.)	0	30	6
Südtirol	2020–21	Serie C	36	6	2	1	—		4	0	42	7
Career total			75	12	5	1	—		6	0	86	13

== Honours ==
=== Club ===
Inter Primavera

- Campionato Primavera 1: 2016–17, 2017–18
- Supercoppa Primavera: 2018
- Torneo Di Viareggio: 2018

Pordenone

- Serie C (Group B): 2018–19
- Supercoppa di Serie C: 2019
