= Karim Zedadka =

French footballer (born 2000)

Personal information
- Date of birth: 9 June 2000 (age 26)
- Place of birth: Pertuis, France
- Height: 1.82 m (6 ft 0 in)
- Position: Midfielder

Team information
- Current team: Empoli (on loan from Südtirol)
- Number: 98

Youth career
- –2018: Nice
- 2018–2020: Napoli

Senior career*
Years	Team	Apps	(Gls)
2018	Nice B	1	(0)
2018–2023	Napoli	3	(0)
2020	→ Cavese (loan)	5	(0)
2021–2022	→ Charleroi (loan)	11	(0)
2023–2024	Swift Hesperange	9	(0)
2024	→ Ascoli (loan)	15	(0)
2024–	Südtirol	47	(2)
2026–	→ Empoli (loan)	1	(0)
- * Club domestic league appearances and goals as of 22 August 2026

Karim Zedadka (Arabic: كريم زدادكة; born 9 June 2000) is a French professional footballer who plays as a midfielder for Serie B club Empoli, on loan from Südtirol.

== Club career ==
In 2018, Zedadka signed for Serie A side Napoli from Nice in France amid interest from Premier League club Leicester City. He was called up to Napoli's senior squad on several occasions in the 2018–19 Serie A season, but did not appear on the field.

In 2020, he was sent on loan to Cavese in the Italian third-tier Serie C. The loan was terminated in January 2021 due to Zedadka's injury.

On 26 August 2021, he went to Charleroi on loan.

Zedadka made his Serie A debut for Napoli on 3 March 2023 against Lazio.

On 31 August 2023, Zedadka signed with Swift Hesperange in Luxembourg.

On 30 January 2024, Zedadka returned to Italy and signed with Ascoli in Serie B on loan with an option to buy.

On 16 July 2024, Zedadka signed a three-year contract with Südtirol.

== International career ==
Despite being born in France, he has expressed desire to represent Algeria internationally.

== Honours ==
Napoli

- Serie A: 2022–23
