= Hamza El Kaouakibi =

Moroccan footballer (born 1998)

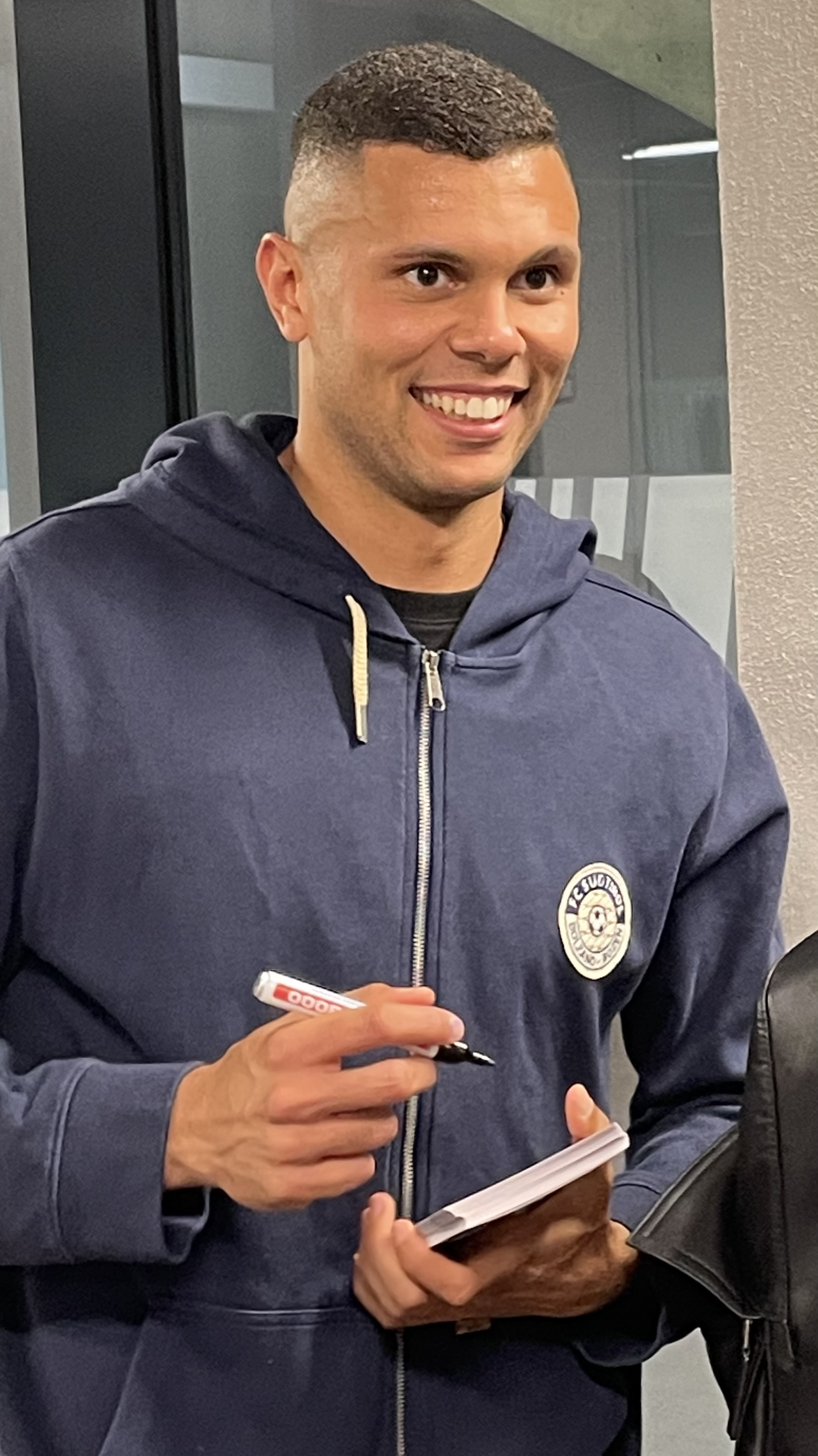

Personal information
- Date of birth: 22 May 1998 (age 28)
- Place of birth: Bentivoglio, Italy
- Height: 1.85 m (6 ft 1 in)
- Position: Defender

Team information
- Current team: Südtirol
- Number: 94

Youth career
- –2018: Bologna

Senior career*
Years	Team	Apps	(Gls)
2018–2022	Bologna	0	(0)
2018–2019	→ Pistoiese (loan)	30	(3)
2019–2020	→ Piacenza (loan)	6	(0)
2020	→ Pianese (loan)	8	(0)
2020–2021	→ Südtirol (loan)	30	(2)
2021–2022	→ Pordenone (loan)	33	(0)
2022–2024	Benevento	33	(0)
2024	→ Südtirol (loan)	7	(1)
2024–	Südtirol	51	(2)

International career
2017	Morocco U20	4	(0)
- * Club domestic league appearances and goals as of 12 May 2026

Hamza El Kaouakibi (Arabic: حمزة الكواكيبي; born 22 May 1998) is a professional footballer who plays as a defender for Serie B club Südtirol. Born in Italy, he is a former Morocco youth international.

== Club career ==
El Kaouakibi made his Serie C debut for Pistoiese on 30 September 2018, in a game against Gozzano. On 26 July 2019, he joined Piacenza on a season-long loan. On 16 January 2020, he signed with Pianese in Serie C. On 11 August 2020 he moved to Südtirol on a season-long loan.

On 3 August 2021 he joined Pordenone on loan.

On 14 July 2022 he joined Benevento on permanent basis.

On 26 January 2024 he moved to Südtirol with the onerous loan formula with an obligation conditional on remaining in Serie B.

== International career ==
Born in Italy, El Kaouakibi is of Moroccan descent; he has represented Morocco internationally at youth level.
