= Stadio Druso =

Football stadium in Bolzano, Italy

Coordinates: 46.492°N 11.346°E

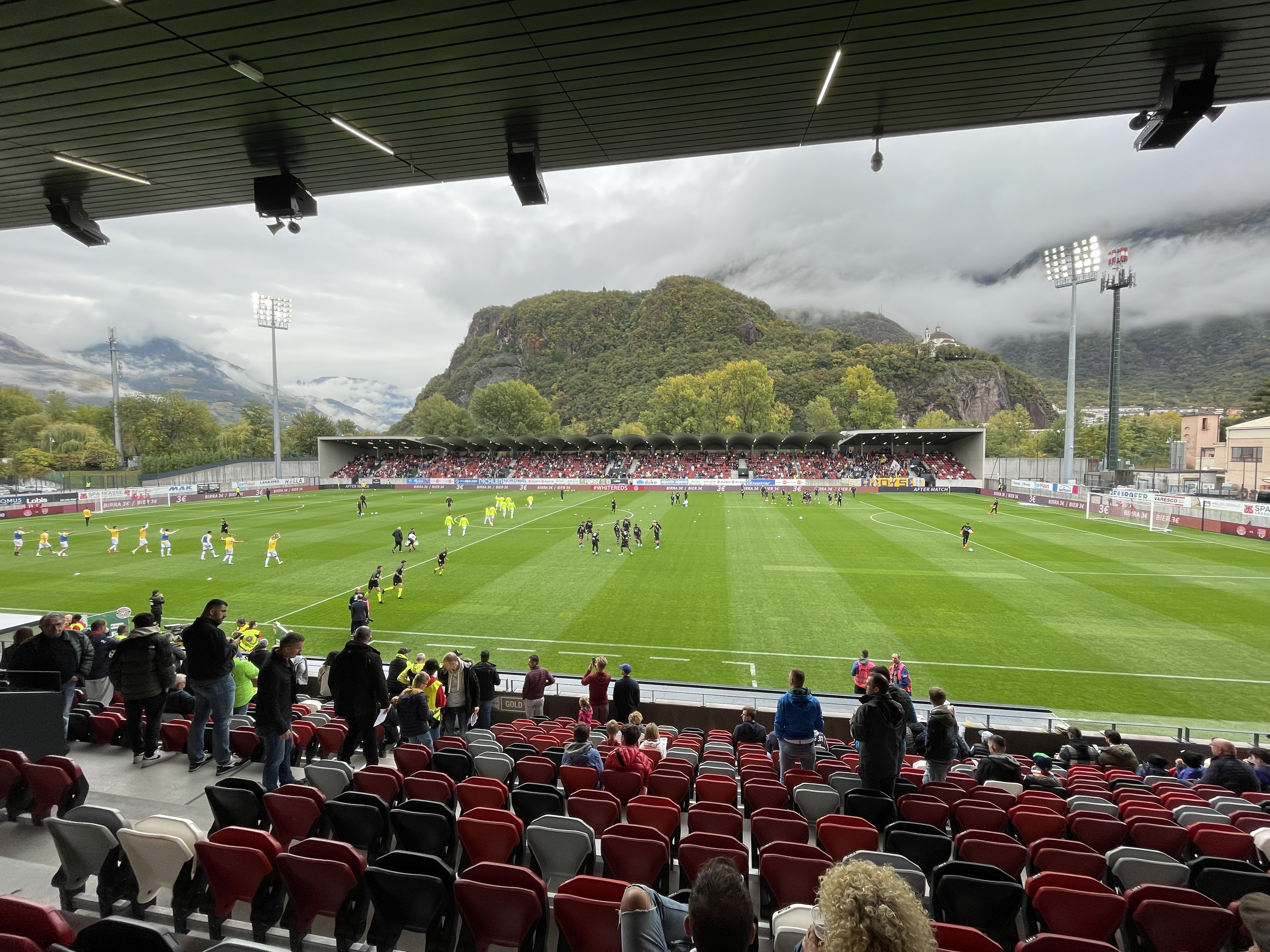
- Interactive map of Stadio Druso
- Location: Bolzano, Italy
- Capacity: 5,539

Construction
- Built: 1930
- Renovated: 2019–2022

Tenants
- F.C. Bolzano 1996 (1931–2015); F.C. Südtirol (2000–present)

Stadio Druso (German: Drusus-Stadion) is an arena in Bolzano, Italy. It is primarily used for football, and is the home to F.C. Südtirol and (until 2015) to F.C. Bolzano 1996.

== History ==
The stadium opened in 1930 with a single grandstand in rationalist style. In 1960 a second grandstand was built on a project of Michele Lettieri. Over the years, the stadium deteriorated, so much so that the main stand was closed for safety reasons during the 1990s.

In 2000, F.C. Südtirol was promoted to Serie C2, and moved from Bressanone to Bolzano: on that occasion, the stands were both roughly restructured in order to reach 3000 seats. In 2002 the municipality of Bolzano dedicated the main grandstand to Christian Zanvettor and the second stand to Albano Canazza.

In 2019, work began on a major renovation of the stadium: both grandstands will be redone and enlarged, and the rationalist facade will be preserved and incorporated into the new facade. The completion of the work, originally scheduled for 2021, has been delayed due to the COVID-19 pandemic and is now expected in mid-2022. Once completed, the stadium has around 5500 seats.

== Gallery ==
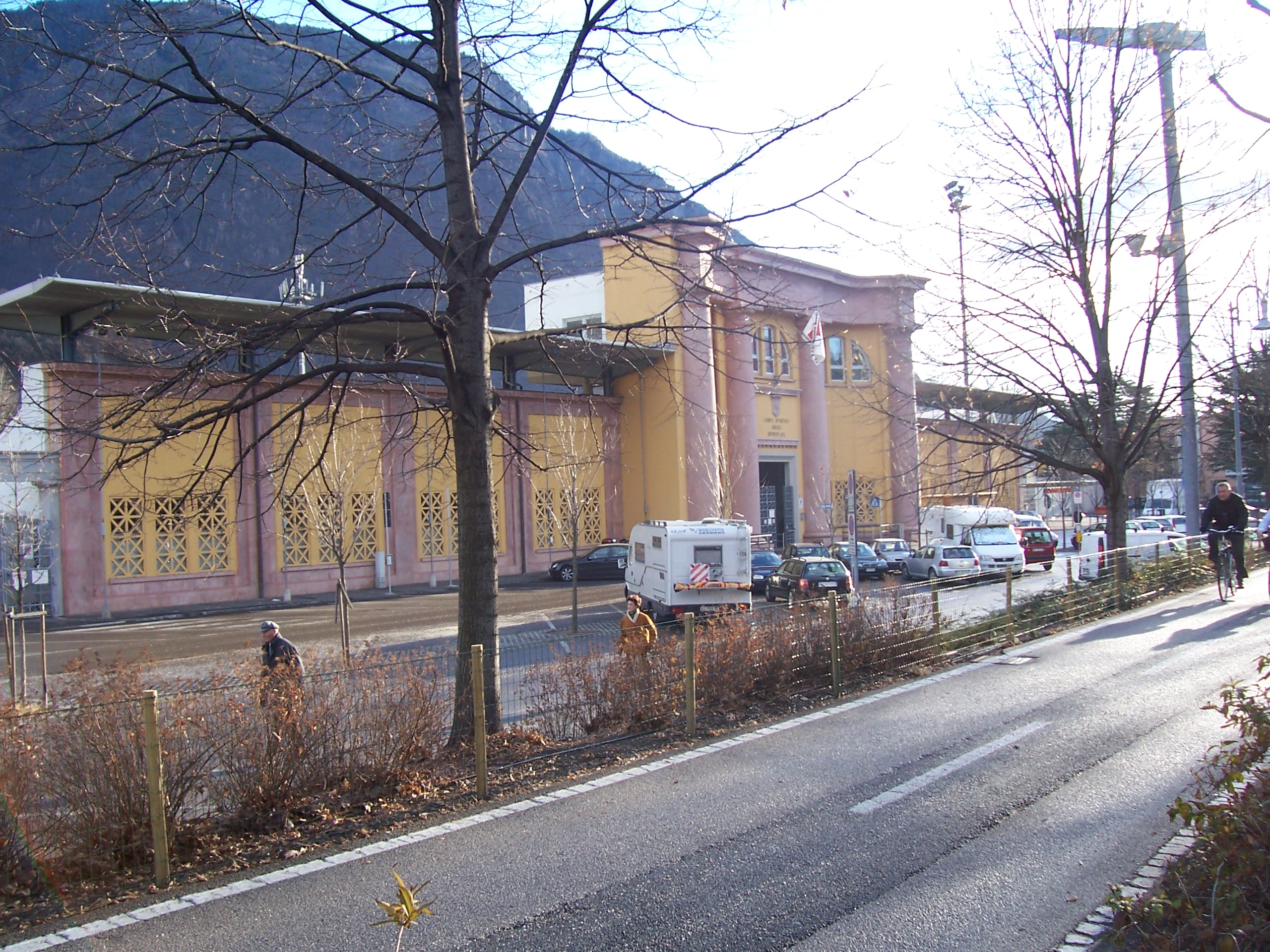
The main facade in 2022, after renovation: the original rationalist structure has been integrated with the new one

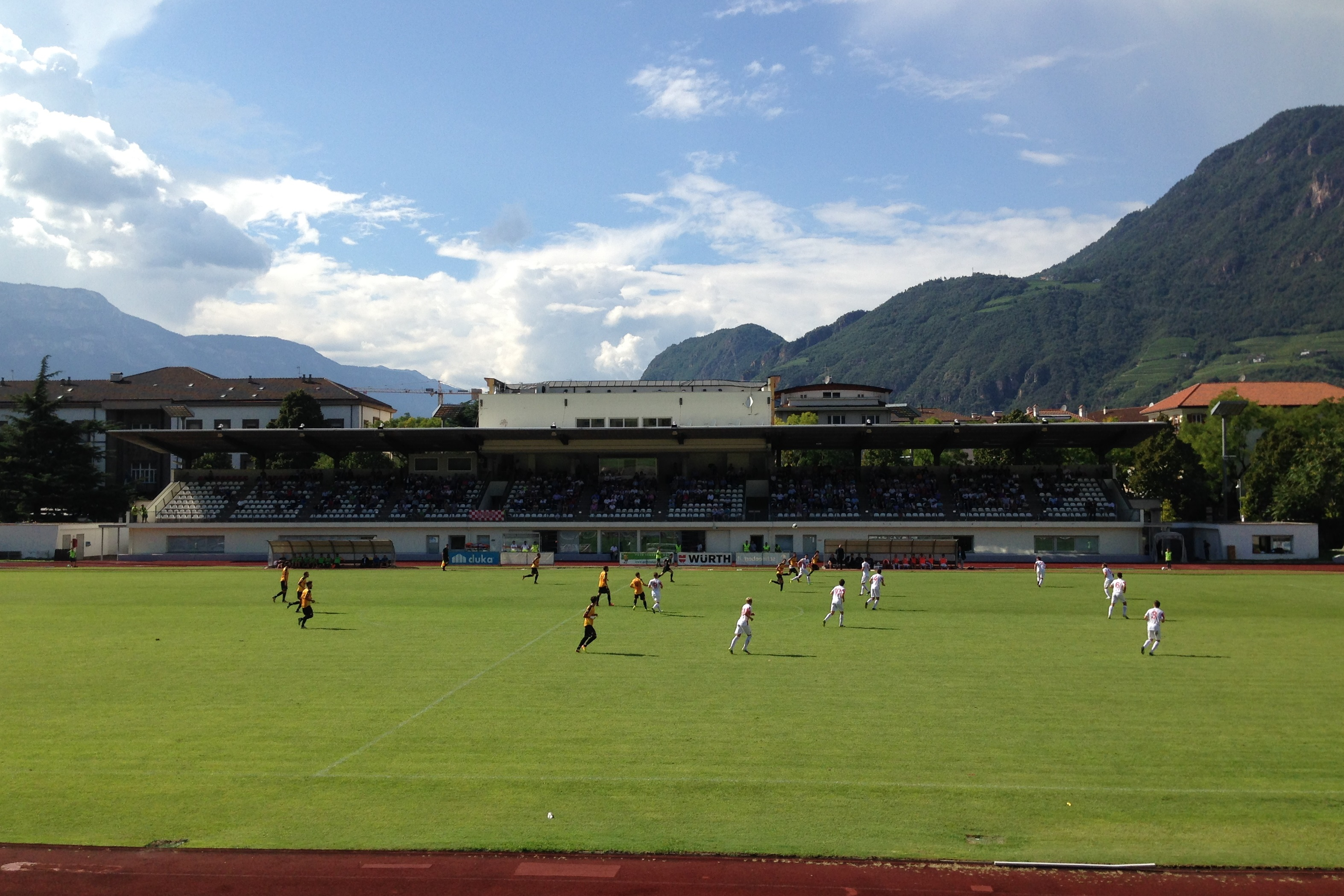
The main grandstand "Christian Zanvettor" in 2014, before renovation

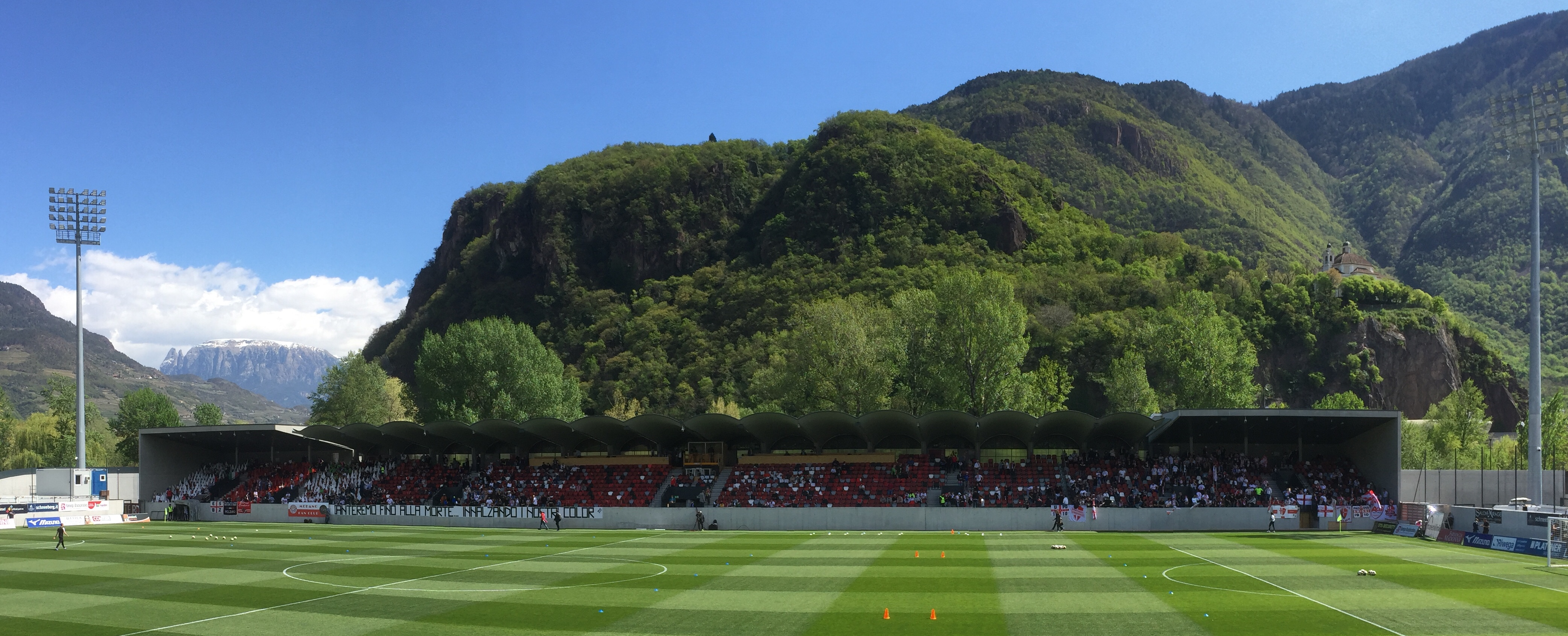
The grandstand "Albano Canazza" in 2022, after renovation

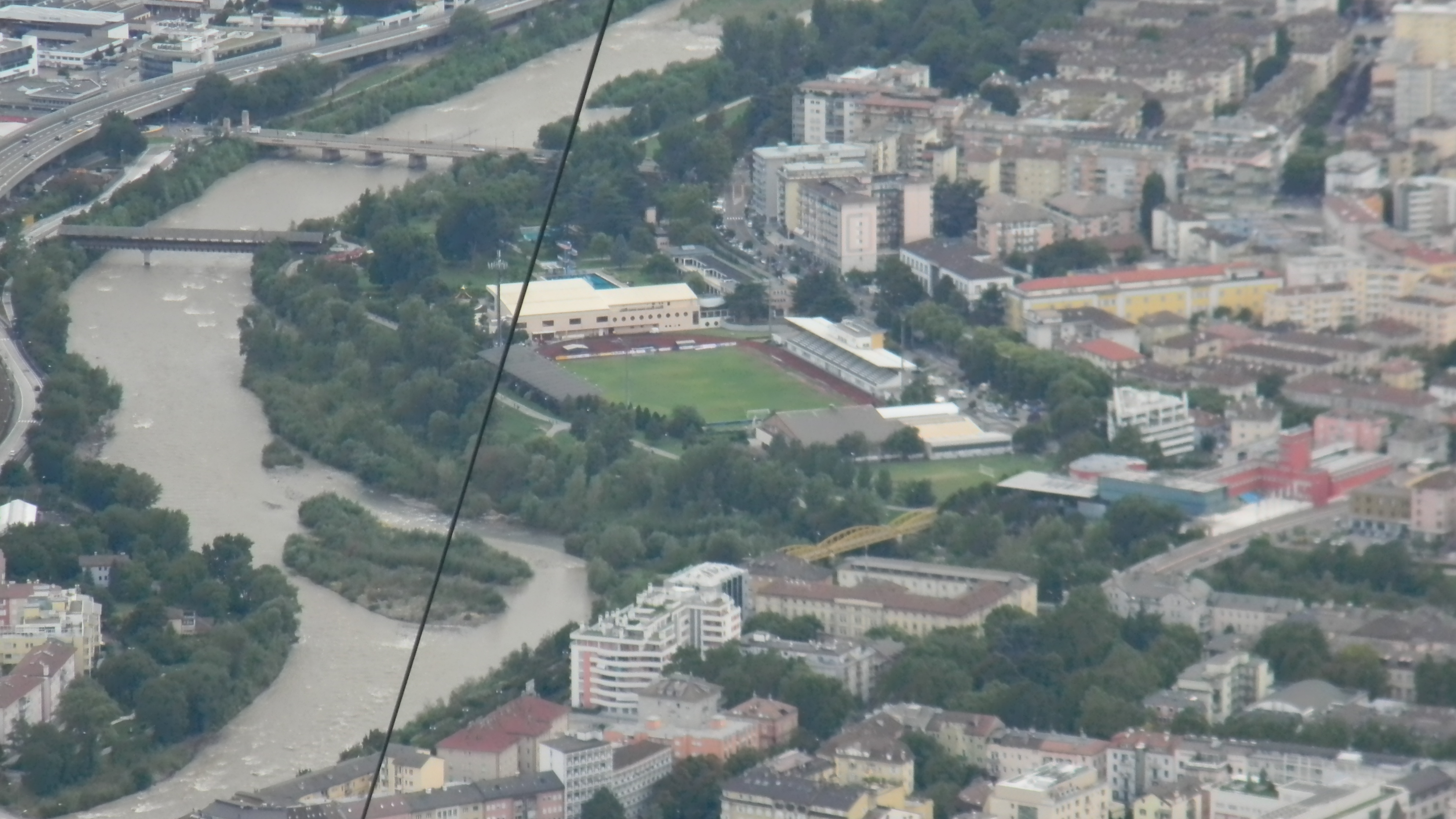
Aerial view of the stadium in 2013, before renovation
