= Simone Davi =

Italian footballer (born 1999)

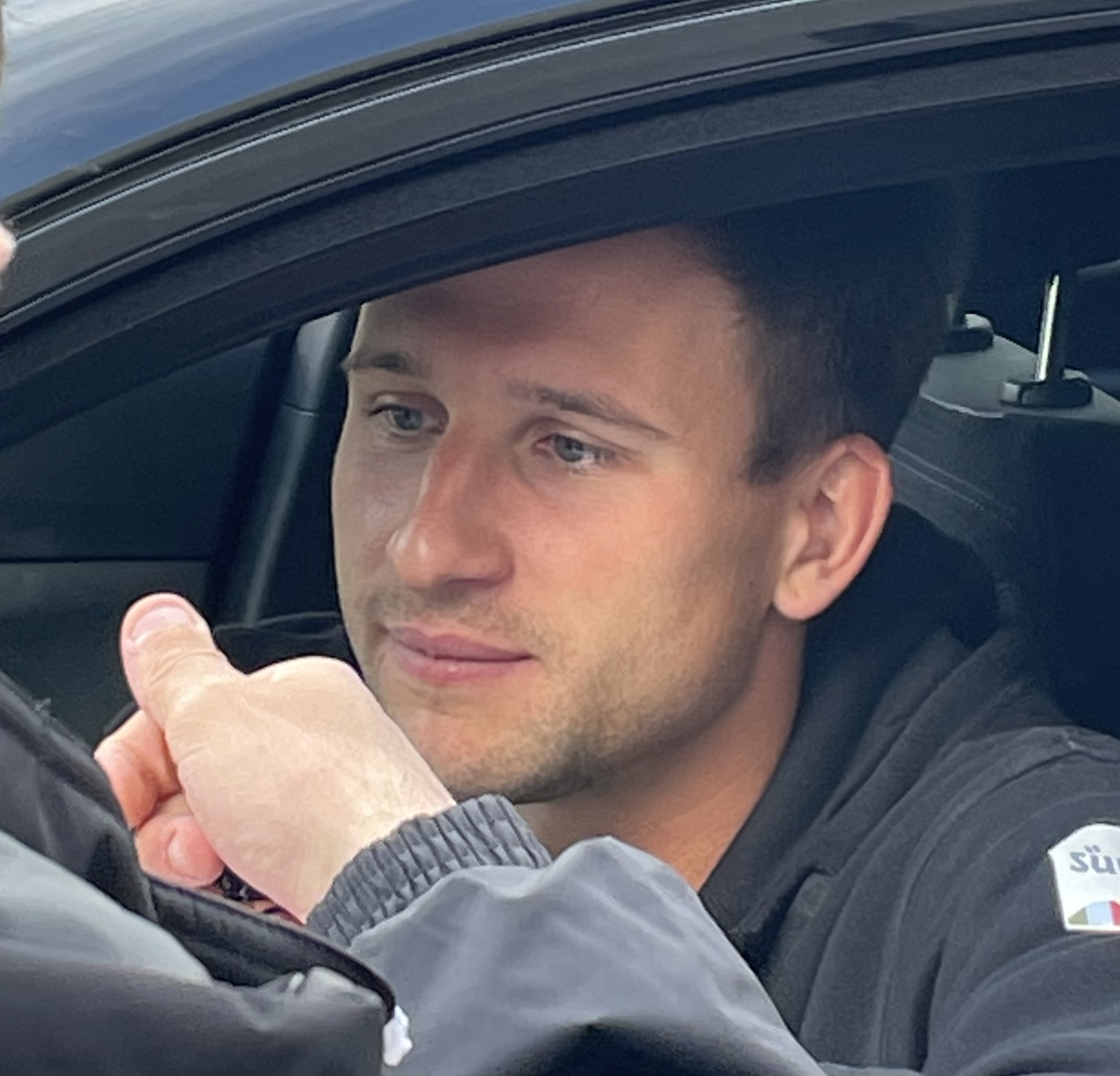
- Davi with Südtirol

Personal information
- Date of birth: 16 September 1999 (age 27)
- Place of birth: Bolzano, Italy
- Height: 1.76 m (5 ft 9 in)
- Position: Left-back

Team information
- Current team: Südtirol
- Number: 24

Youth career
- –2018: Südtirol

Senior career*
Years	Team	Apps	(Gls)
2017–	Südtirol	142	(2)
2017–2019	→ Virtus Bolzano (loan)	29	(2)
- * Club domestic league appearances and goals as of 12 May 2026

Simone Davi (born 16 September 1999) is an Italian footballer who plays as a left-back for Serie B club Südtirol.

== Career ==
Davi was raised in the youth teams of Südtirol. He began his senior career in the 2017–18 season, on loan to Eccellenza club Virtus Bolzano, which was promoted to Serie D.

For the 2022–23 season, Südtirol was promoted to Serie B. He made his Serie B debut for Südtirol on 21 August 2022 in a game against Venezia.
