= Fabian Tait =

Italian footballer

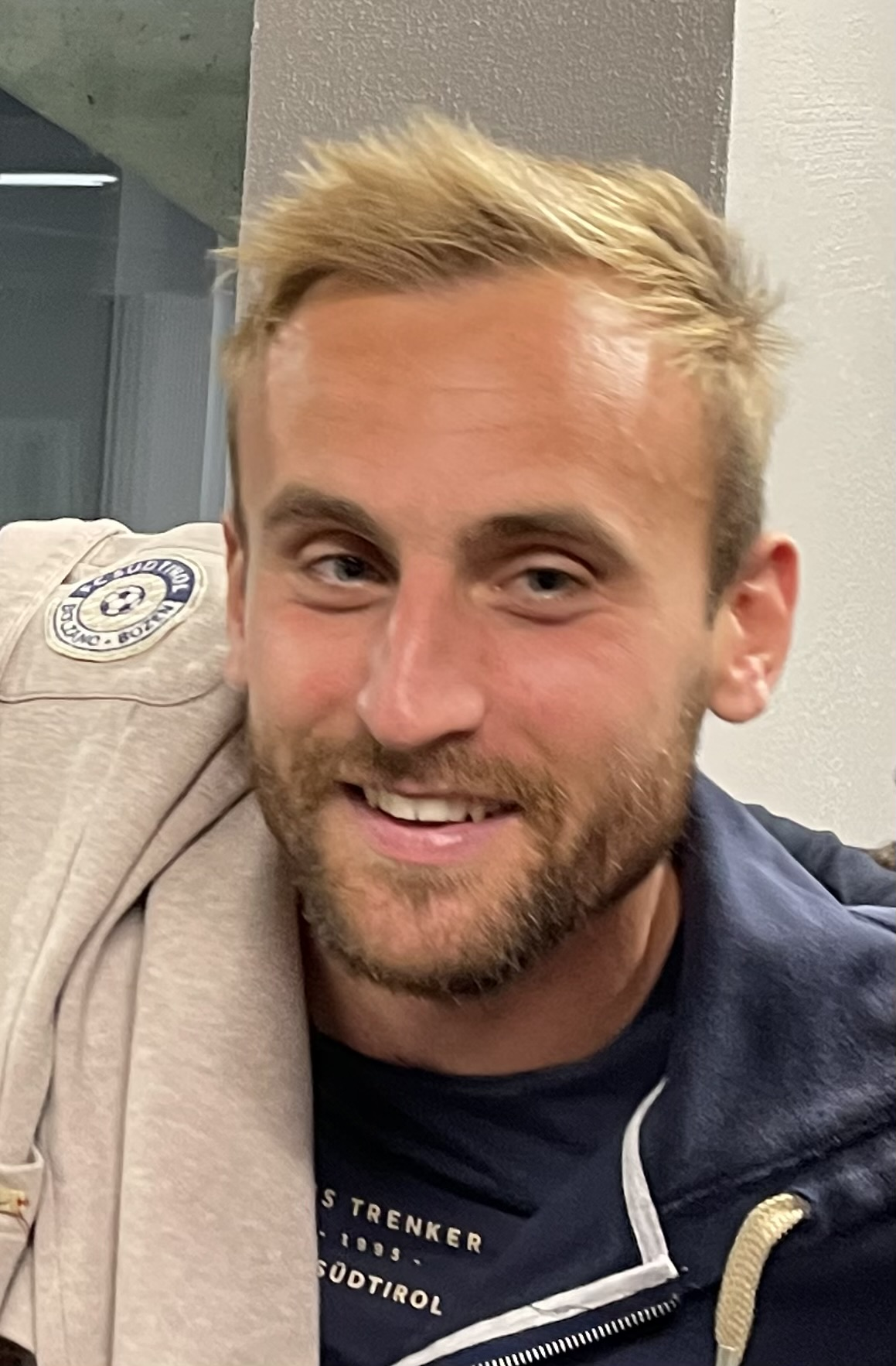
- 2024

Personal information
- Full name: Fabian Tait
- Date of birth: 10 February 1993 (age 33)
- Place of birth: Salorno, Italy
- Height: 1.86 m (6 ft 1 in)
- Position: Midfielder

Team information
- Current team: Südtirol
- Number: 21

Senior career*
Years	Team	Apps	(Gls)
2009–2010	ASV Salurn	16	(1)
2010–2013	Mezzocorona	76	(6)
2013–2014	Calcio Marano	8	(0)
2014–	Südtirol	378	(25)
- * Club domestic league appearances and goals as of 12 May 2026

Fabian Tait (born 10 February 1993) is an Italian professional footballer who plays as a midfielder for Serie B club Südtirol.

== Club career ==
Born in Salorno, Tait started his career in modest Eccellenza club ASV Salurn and Serie C2 club Mezzocorona.

In June 2014, he joined Serie C club Südtirol. On 13 September 2019, he extended his contract until 2023, at date he played 168 matches and 10 goals for the team, and he is also the second captain.

On 24 November 2019, he played his 200 match for the club.
