= FC Südtirol =

Italian football club

Südtirol
- Full name: Fußball Club Südtirol s.r.l.
- Nicknames: (in Italian and German); Biancorossi / Weiß-Rote (White and reds); Tirolesi / Tiroler (Tyroleans); Altoatesini, Sudtirolesi / Südtiroler (South Tyroleans)
- Short name: FCS
- Founded: 1974 (as SV Milland Fussball)
- Stadium: Stadio Druso
- Capacity: 5,500
- President: Gerhard Comper
- Head coach: Davide Possanzini
- League: Serie B
- 2025–26: Serie B, 16th of 20
- Website: fc-suedtirol.com
Home colours	Away colours	Third colours

Fußball Club Südtirol, commonly referred to as Südtirol, is an Italian association football club, based in the city of Bolzano, in the autonomous province of South Tyrol. The club was formerly known as its bilingual name F.C. Südtirol – Alto Adige. They played for the first time in their history in Serie B during the 2022–23 season after having been crowned Serie C champions in the 2021–22 campaign.

== History ==
In the early ‘90s came the idea to bring professional football back to South Tyrol, because since the ‘80s with FC Bolzano, no South Tyrolean team played in a professional league.

Negotiations for the takeover of FC Bolzano, which was in financial difficulties, failed.

A South Tyrolean entrepreneurial group then took over SV Milland, founded in 1974 and based in a district of Brixen, which played before the acquisition in the season 1994/95 in the regional Eccellenza, but was relegated after that season into the Promozione.

=== 1995–2000: In the amateur leagues ===
The team was renamed FC Südtirol–Alto Adige in 1995; Alto Adige is the Italian name of the province, while Südtirol is its German name.

The club started its first season in 1995 in the regional Promozione (then still the seventh-highest league in Italy). Immediate promotion to the Eccellenza was achieved via a first-place finish.

From the 1997/98 season, the club played in the national league Serie D (V). Each season, the FC Südtirol was able to improve. In 2000, then under coach Giuseppe Sannino, it was promoted to Serie C2 (IV), the lowest professional league.

=== 2000–2010: FC Südtirol in Serie C2 (IV) ===
In 2000, the company incorporated as Fußballclub Südtirol S.r.l., thus becoming F.C. Südtirol and relocating to Bolzano, though it was legally based in Brixen until 2011.

The club was able to establish itself quickly in the professional league. The aim of the club was to achieve promotion into Serie C1 as soon as possible but often failed in the following seasons each time in the play-offs. FC Südtirol got into financial difficulties and then focused more on youth work.

Just before the end of the season 2008/09, youth coach Alfredo Sebastiani took over the first team. With him, the club avoided relegation in the play-outs against Valenzana Calcio. Under Sebastiani, the team in 2009/10 reached for the first time promotion to Serie C1 (III), by finishing the season in first place.

=== 2010 to 2022: from Serie C to Serie B ===
In the 2010–11 Lega Pro Prima Divisione season, Südtirol was relegated to Lega Pro Seconda Divisione after the relegation "play-out", but on 4 August 2011 was readmitted to Lega Pro Prima Divisione to fill vacancies.

In the next season, the club hired Giovanni Stroppa, who was at that time youth coach of Milan. The team was able to establish itself in the third tier and narrowly missed the promotion play-offs. With good performances, players like Manuel Fischnaller and Alessandro Iacobucci moved to the Serie B. After the season Stroppa became coach of Serie A club Pescara.

In the 2012–13 Lega Pro Prima Divisione season, the team was coached by Stefano Vecchi. With him, the team was able to reach the promotion playoffs of the Italian third tier for the first time in club history. In the play-off semi-final the team was eliminated by Carpi, which eventually won promotion. In the following season, Vecchi was hired by Carpi.

The 2013–14 season started with Lorenzo D'Anna as coach, previously youth coach of Chievo. Under him, the team could score only five points in the first five matches, which was not enough for the promotion ambitions of the club. They changed coaches and hired Claudio Rastelli.

During the championship, the team was able to prevail better and in the end reached third place in the table. That was the best result of the club's history and the repeated achievement of the play-offs. In the quarterfinals, the team prevailed against Como on penalties. In the semi-final, Cremonese was defeated over two legs. The final round for promotion to Serie B was lost against Pro Vercelli.

Südtirol's 2021–22 season turned out to be the most successful in club history, as they won the title race on the final matchday, with a five-point advantage to runners-up Padova, and also reached the 2021–22 Coppa Italia Serie C final, losing on aggregate to Padova.

Therefore, they acquired their place in the Serie B for the 2022–23 season, which was to be both Südtirol's first time in the league, as well as the first time a club from Südtirol/Alto Adige qualified for a spot in the Italian second division.

=== 2022 to present ===
The 2022–23 season turned out to be an even bigger success for Südtirol.

While losing their first three league matches and suffering an embarrassing early knockout from the Coppa Italia on home turf against Serie C opponent Feralpisalò, the team quickly picked up the pace of the league and were in constant contention for promotion to Serie A, either directly or via play-offs.

A late campaign blow to their form meant that Südtirol clinched 6th place in the league with 58 points, which meant they qualified to the promotion play-off preliminary round, coming 15 points short of directly promoted Genoa's 73 points in second place, and only two points short of play-off semi-final qualifiers Parma in fourth place.

The preliminary play-off round saw Südtirol hosting Reggina in a one-match showdown, where Pierpaolo Bisoli's squad managed to clinch a nail-biting 1–0 victory with a late Daniele Casiraghi goal in the 89th minute to advance into the semi-finals where they met 3rd-place finishers Bari in a two-match pairing.

On home turf, Südtirol managed to win with an even more late goal by Matteo Rover in the 90+2nd minute to put Südtirol in the lead.

The second leg saw Südtirol being one man up in the San Nicola after a first half red card on behalf of Bari, but a 70th minute Leonardo Benedetti goal meant that Bari equalized the aggregate score, which meant that Südtirol got eliminated as the higher regular season finish is used as a tiebreaker.

In the 2023-24 season, despite some challenging moments (which led to the dismissal of coach Bisoli in favor of the Italian-Swiss Federico Valente, who came from the youth teams), Südtirol managed to secure their place in Serie B.

== Colors and badge ==
=== Colors ===
The team's colors are white and red showing its roots in the province of South Tyrol and the city of Bolzano, present in their traditional coats of arms and flags.

Historically, the home jerseys of the club are white. Most of the time the team plays away matches in red jerseys, but from time to time they can be black as well.

=== Badge ===
The current logo of the association is a slightly different form of the badge used since the club was founded in 1995 to 2016.

The logo of the association is a circular badge with a white-red diamond pattern and a football inside. The logo is circled with the words "FC Südtirol" (German term for "FC South Tyrol") and "Bolzano - Bozen". Compared to the previous badge, the diamond pattern was renewed and the red color darkened slightly.

== Club facilities ==
=== Stadium ===
The home games of FC Südtirol are played in the Drusus stadium in Bolzano, named after Nero Drusus, a Roman general.

Built in 1936 as a multi-sport facility and wholly renovated between 2019 and 2021 as a pure football ground, the Drusus stadium has a main and opposite tribune and it can accommodate up to 5,500 spectators.

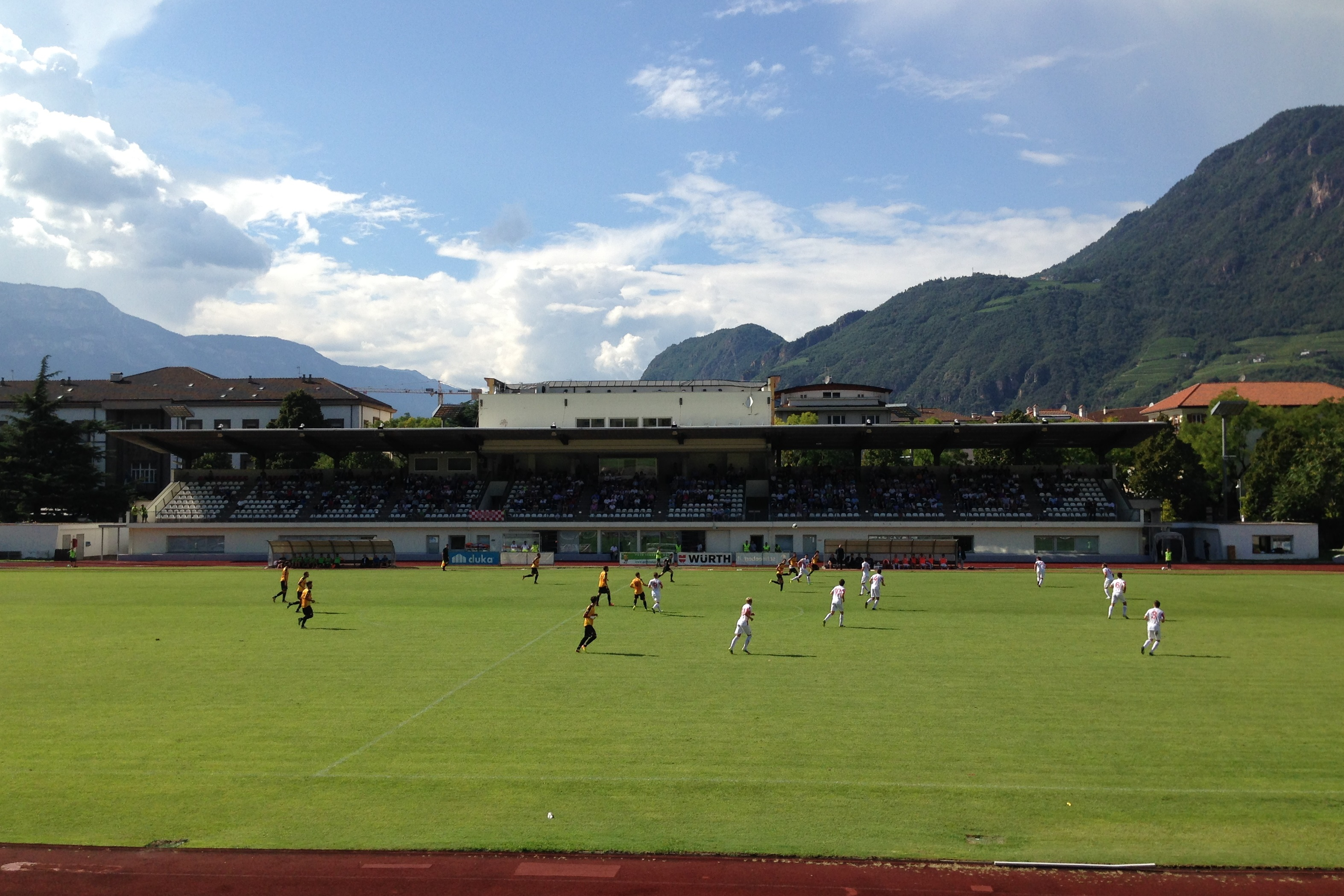
The Drusus stadium in Bolzano before the renovation...

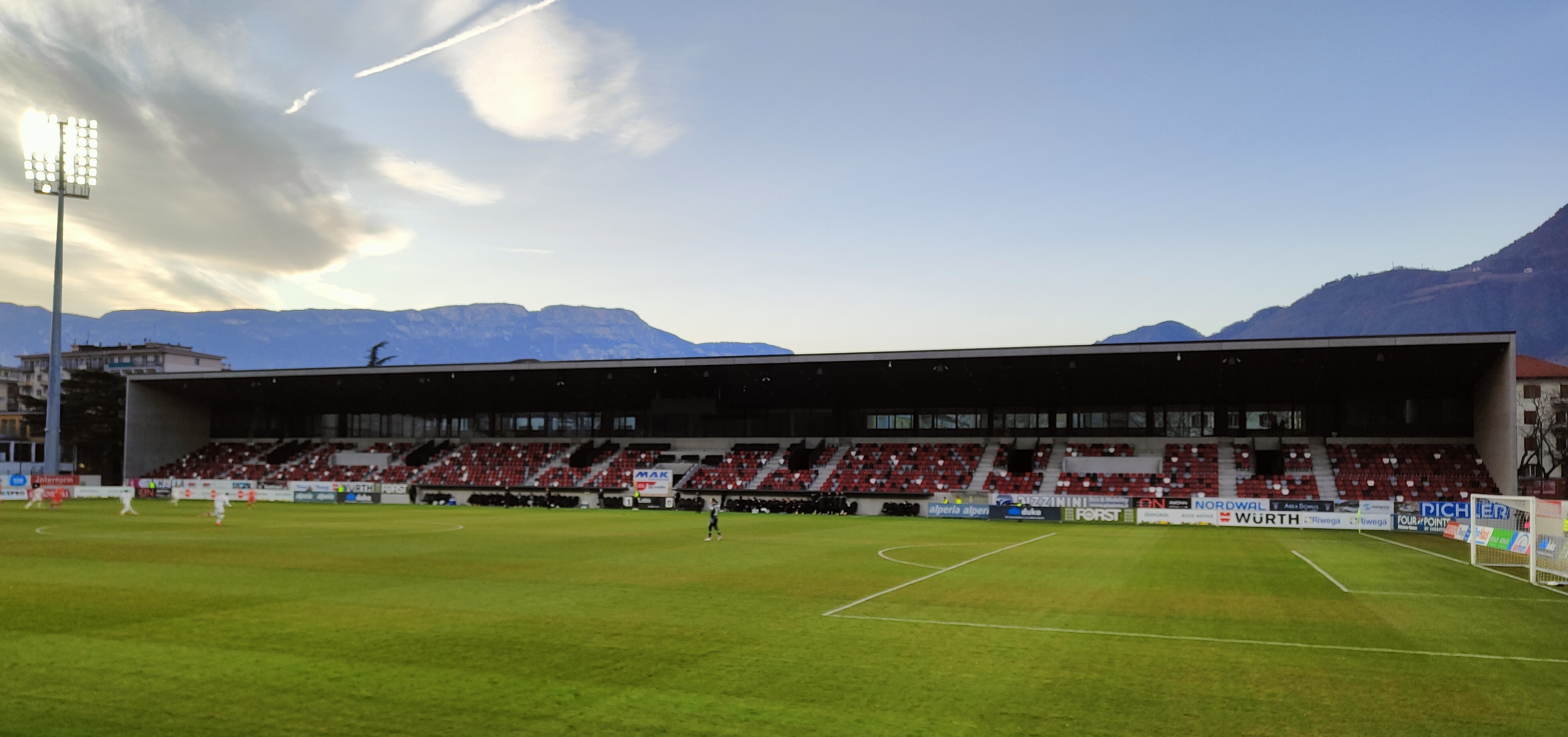
...and after the renovation: the athletics track has been removed.

=== FCS Center ===
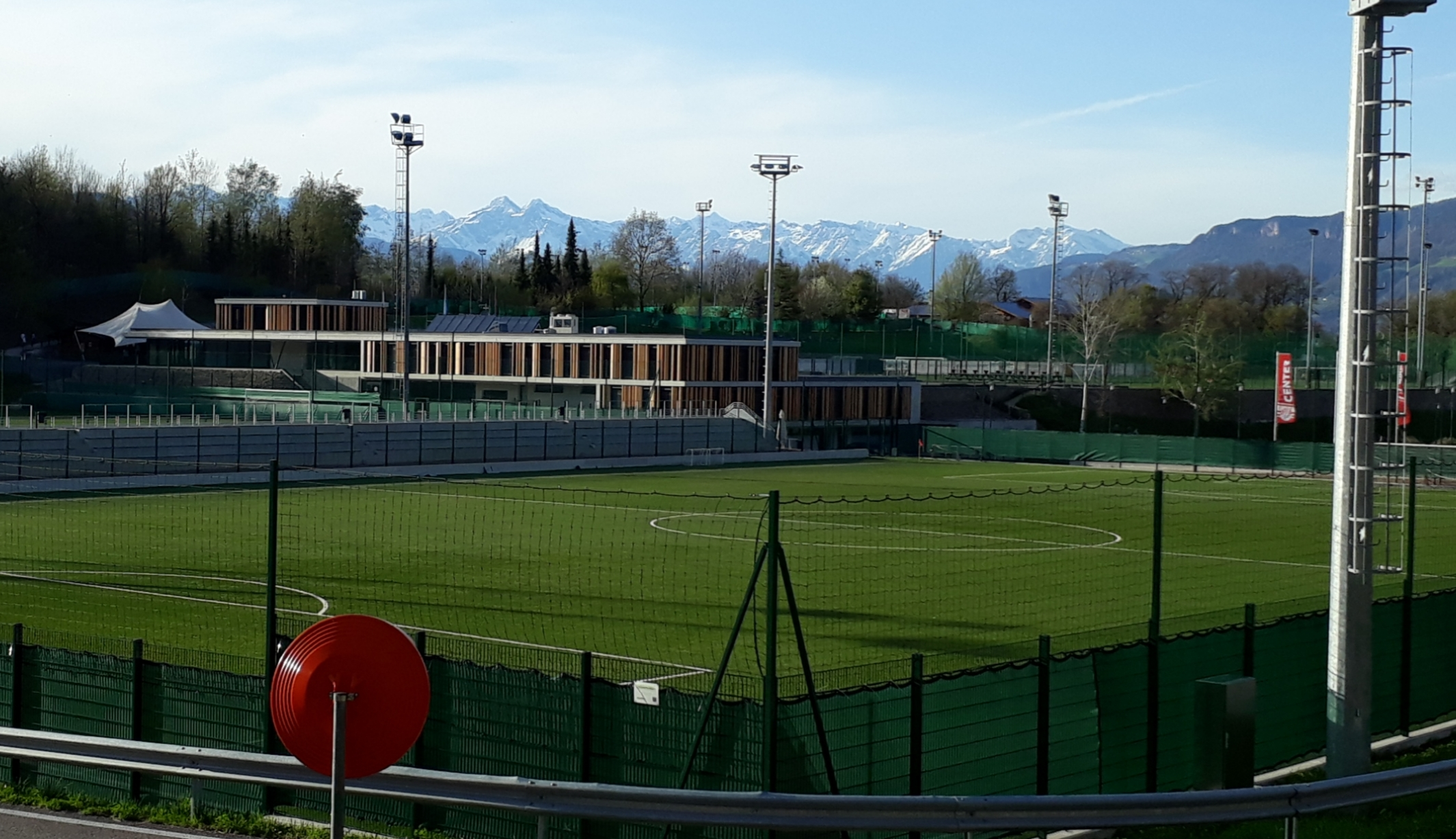
The FCS Center in Eppan, near Bolzano.

The FCS Center is the training center of the team, located in Rungg-Maso Ronco (Eppan), 9 km away from downtown Bolzano.

In 2015, the training areas were renovated, creating two natural turf pitches, two artificial turf pitches and another small artificial turf pitch.

The service center was opened in 2018 and offers changing rooms, offices, a gym with a medical department, meeting rooms, a restaurant and a fan shop. In the training center are also held the championship games of the youth teams of FC Südtirol.

In 2010, the training center was the training camp of the Germany national football team for the preparation of the World Cup in South Africa. Again in 2018 the German team used the center for the preparation to the World Cup in Russia.

== Current squad ==
As of 10 September 2026

Note: Flags indicate national team as defined under FIFA eligibility rules; some limited exceptions apply. Players may hold more than one non-FIFA nationality.

No.	Pos.	Nation	Player
3	DF	ITA	Davide Veroli (on loan from Cagliari)
4	DF	ITA	Riccardo Stivanello (on loan from Bologna)
5	MF	ITA	Simone Tronchin
8	MF	FIN	Niklas Pyyhtiä (on loan from Bologna)
9	FW	ROU	Rareș Burnete (on loan from Lecce)
10	MF	ITA	Fabio Rispoli (on loan from Como)
11	FW	CPV	Vasco Lopes
12	GK	SLO	Rok Vadjunec
13	DF	ITA	Marco Varnier
14	MF	SRB	Aljoša Vasić (on loan from Palermo)
17	FW	ITA	Lorenzo Anghelè (on loan from Juventus)
18	MF	ITA	Kevin Zeroli (on loan from AC Milan)
19	MF	ITA	Mattia Pellini (on loan from Torino)

No.	Pos.	Nation	Player
20	MF	ISL	Bjarki Bjarkason
21	MF	ITA	Fabian Tait
22	GK	ITA	Alessandro Plizzari (on loan from Venezia)
23	DF	ITA	Federico Davi
24	DF	ITA	Simone Davi
25	FW	GLP	Kenny Mixtur
27	DF	ITA	Giacomo Stabile (on loan from Inter)
46	MF	TUN	Dhirar Brik
55	DF	ITA	Andrea Giorgini
79	MF	ITA	Salvatore Molina
80	MF	ITA	Elias Schrott
90	FW	ITA	Alvin Okoro (on loan from Venezia)
94	DF	MAR	Hamza El Kaouakibi

=== Out on loan ===
Note: Flags indicate national team as defined under FIFA eligibility rules; some limited exceptions apply. Players may hold more than one non-FIFA nationality.

No.	Pos.	Nation	Player
—	DF	ITA	Raphael Kofler (at Cagliari until 30 June 2027)
—	DF	ITA	Benedikt Rottensteiner (at Trapani until 30 June 2027)
—	MF	ITA	Daniele Casiraghi (at Ravenna until 30 June 2027)

No.	Pos.	Nation	Player
—	MF	ITA	Marco Frigerio (at Union Brescia until 30 June 2027)
—	MF	ALG	Karim Zedadka (at Empoli until 30 June 2027)

== Club staff ==
Position	Name
Head coach	(Italy) Fabrizio Castori
Assistant head coach	(Italy) Riccardo Bocchini
Goalkeeping coach	(Italy) Massimo Marini
Athletic coach	(Italy) Danilo Chiodi (Italy) Carlo Pescosolido
Technical assistant	(Italy) Marco Castori (Italy) Tommaso Marolda
Rehab coach	(Italy) Alberto Andorlini

== Honours ==
- Serie C
  - Winner: 2021–22
- Serie C2
  - Winner: 2009–10

== Notable players ==
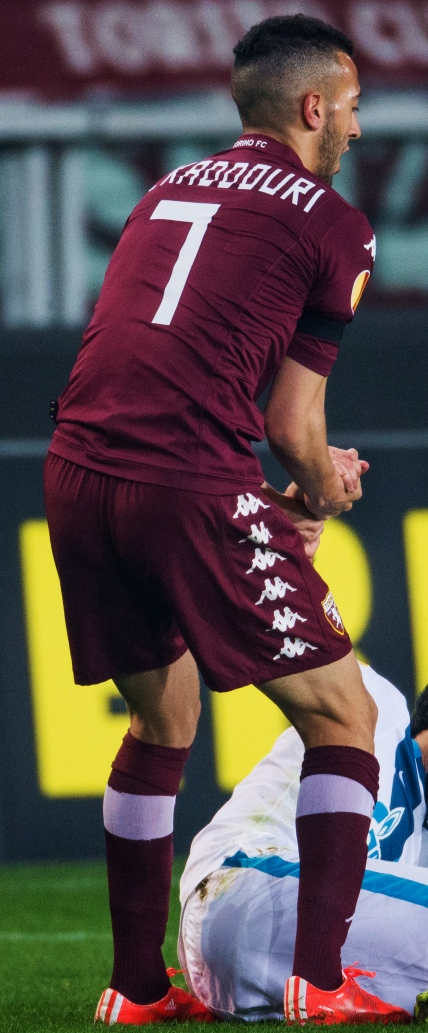
Omar El Kaddouri

The following list includes players who played or have played more than 10 matches in either Serie A or Serie B.

- (Italy) Michael Agazzi
- (Italy) Dario Bova
- (Italy) Massimiliano Caputo
- (Italy) Michael Cia
- (Italy) Carlo Gervasoni
- (Italy) Andrea Guerra
- (Italy) Marco Mallus
- (Italy) Manuel Mancini
- (Italy) Luca Mazzitelli
- (Italy) Marco Moro
- (Italy) Simone Motta
- (Italy) Alessandro Noselli
- (Italy) Manuel Scavone
- (Italy) Andrea Seculin
- (Italy) Alessio Sestu
- (Italy) Giampietro Zecchin
- (Italy) Arturo Lupoli
- (Morocco) Omar El Kaddouri
- (Chile) Nicolas Corvetto

== Notable managers ==
The following list includes managers who coached or have coached teams in the Serie A or Serie B.

- (Croatia) Ivan Javorčić
- (Italy) Giovanni Stroppa
- (Italy) Giuseppe Sannino
- (Italy) Attilio Tesser
- (Italy) Stefano Vecchi
- (Italy) Marco Baroni
