= 2025–26 AC Reggiana 1919 season =

Italian football club season 2025-26

AC Reggiana 1919
2025-26 season
- Manager: Davide Dionigi
- Stadium: Mapei Stadium – Città del Tricolore
- Serie B: 8th
- Coppa Italia: Round of 32
- Top goalscorer: League: All: Cedric Gondo (2)
- Biggest win: Reggiana 3–1 Empoli
- Biggest defeat: Palermo 2–1 Reggiana

The 2025–26 season is the 107th season in the history of Associazione Calcio Reggiana and their third consecutive season in Serie B of Italy's football league. Reggiana will enter the Coppa Italia at the round of 64. The competitions begin on 15 August.

== Squad ==
=== Transfers In ===
Pos.	Player	Transferred from	Fee	Date	Source
FW	(Portugal) Muhamed Varela Djamanca	(Italy) Torres	Loan return	30 June 2025	
DF	(Italy) Diego Stramaccioni	(Italy) Gubbio	Loan return	30 June 2025	
MF	(Italy) Matteo Rover	(Italy) FC Südtirol	Undisclosed	18 July 2025	
MF	(Argentina) Roque Maisterra	(Italy) Brescia U19	Free	3 August 2025	
DF	(Italy) Danilo Quaranta	(Italy) Juve Stabia	Undisclosed	4 August 2025	
GK	(Italy) Andrea Seculin	(Italy) Trapani	Undisclosed	8 August 2025	
MF	(Italy) Leonardo Mendicino	(Italy) Atalanta U23	Loan	9 August 2025	
FW	(United States) Andrija Novakovich	(Italy) Venezia	Undisclosed	21 August 2025	
DF	(Italy) Giangiacomo Magnani	(Italy) Palermo	Loan	29 August 2025	
MF	(Brazil) Charlys	(Italy) Hellas Verona	Loan	31 August 2025	
DF	(Italy) Alessandro Tripaldelli	(Italy) Bari	Loan	1 September 2025	
FW	(France) Mathis Lambourde	(Italy) Hellas Verona	Loan	1 September 2025	
GK	(Italy) Gianluca Saro	(Italy) Cremonese	Loan	1 September 2025	

=== Transfers Out ===
Pos.	Player	Transferred to	Fee	Date	Source
MF	(Italy) Alessandro Sersanti	(Italy) Juventus Next Gen	Loan return	30 June 2025	
DF	(Italy) Riccardo Fiamozzi	(Italy) Trento		1 July 2025	
FW	(Italy) Mattia Destro			1 July 2025	
GK	(Italy) Francesco Bardi	(Italy) Palermo	End of contract	1 July 2025	
FW	(Italy) Luca Vido	(Italy) Union Brescia	End of contract	1 July 2025	
FW	(Italy) Stefano Pettinari		End of contract	1 July 2025	
FW	(Portugal) Muhamed Varela Djamanca	(Italy) Arezzo	Undisclosed	8 July 2025	
MF	(Italy) Matteo Maggio	(Italy) Crotone	Loan	5 August 2025	
DF	(Italy) Giacomo Cavallini	(Italy) Forlì	Loan	9 August 2025	
DF	(France) Yannis Nahounou	(France) Nancy	Undisclosed	12 August 2025	
GK	(Italy) Alex Sposito	(Italy) Trapani	Undisclosed	12 August 2025	
DF	(Italy) Diego Stramaccioni	(Italy) Trapani	Undisclosed	21 August 2025	
MF	(Nigeria) Nuhu Shaibu	(Italy) FC Pompei	Loan	26 August 2025	
DF	(Italy) Andrea Meroni	(Italy) Bari	Undisclosed	1 September 2025	

== Friendlies ==
25 July 2025	Reggiana	2–0	Alcione Milano

2 August 2025	Juventus	2–2	Reggiana

9 August 2025	Reggiana	0–0	Cremonese

== Competitions ==
=== Overall record ===
Competition	First match	Last match	Starting round	Final position	Record							
Competition	First match	Last match	Starting round	Final position	Pld	W	D	L	GF	GA	GD	Win %
Serie B	23 August 2025	8–10 May 2026	Matchday 1		4	1	2	1	6	5	+1	25.00
Coppa Italia	15 August 2025		Round of 32	Round of 32	1	0	1	0	1	1	+0	0.00
Total					5	1	3	1	7	6	+1	20.00

Last updated: 20 September 2025
Source: Competitions

=== Serie B ===
==== League table ====
Pos	Team	Pld	W	D	L	GF	GA	GD	Pts	Promotion, qualification or relegation
16	Südtirol (O)	38	8	17	13	38	48	−10	41	Qualification for relegation play-out
17	Bari (R)	38	10	10	18	38	60	−22	40	Qualification for relegation play-out
18	Reggiana (R)	38	9	10	19	36	56	−20	37	Relegation to Serie C
19	Spezia (R)	38	8	11	19	43	59	−16	35 (Note: Spezia finished ahead of Pescara on head-to-head points: Spezia 2–1 Pescara, Pescara 1–1 Spezia.)	Relegation to Serie C
20	Pescara (R)	38	7	14	17	51	66	−15	35	Relegation to Serie C

Source: Serie BKT
Rules for classification: 1) Points; 2) Head-to-head points; 3) Head-to-head goal difference; 4) Goal difference; 5) Goals scored; 6) Draw.
(Note: Head-to-head record is used only after all the matches between the teams in question have been played)
(O) Play-off winners; (R) Relegated

==== Results summary ====
Overall								Home						Away					
Pld	W	D	L	GF	GA	GD	Pts	W	D	L	GF	GA	GD	W	D	L	GF	GA	GD
38	9	10	19	36	56	−20	37	5	7	7	21	23	−2	4	3	12	15	33	−18

==== Results by round ====
Round	1	2	3	4
Ground	A	H	A	H
Result	L	W	D	D
Position	13	9	8	

Updated to match(es) played on 20 September 2025. Source:
A = Away; H = Home; W = Win; D = Draw; L = Loss

==== Matches ====
23 August 2025 1	Palermo	2–1	Reggiana	Palermo
20:00 UTC+2	Diakité (yellow card) 30'; Pohjanpalo 38'; Pierozzi 64'		Papetti (yellow card) 52'; Tavşan 62'	Stadium: Stadio Renzo Barbera; Attendance: 30,868; Referee: Ivano Pezzuto

29 August 2025 2	Reggiana	3–1	Empoli	Reggio Emilia
19:30 UTC+2	Gondo 44' (pen.); Reinhart 57'; Portanova 78'		Popov 12'; Guarino (red card) 42'; Obaretin (red card) 45+1'; Ignacchiti (yellow card) 73'	Stadium: Mapei Stadium – Città del Tricolore; Attendance: 8,592; Referee: Juan Luca Sacchi

13 September 2025 3	Juve Stabia	0–0	Reggiana	Castellammare di Stabia
14:00 UTC+2	Mosti (yellow card) 21'; Mannini (yellow card) 70'; Correia (yellow card) 88'; Ruggero (yellow card) 88'			Stadium: Stadio Romeo Menti; Attendance: 4,090; Referee: Mario Perri

20 September 2025 4	Reggiana	2–2	Catanzaro	Reggio Emilia
14:00 UTC+2	Marras (yellow card) 10', (goal) 36'; Lambourde 74'		Cissè 29', 78'; Favasuli (yellow card) 45+4'; Bettella (yellow card) 55'	Stadium: Mapei Stadium – Città del Tricolore; Attendance: 9,579; Referee: Niccolò Turrini

27 September 2025 5	Südtirol	3–1	Reggiana	Bolzano
15:00 UTC+2	Martini 18'; Merkaj 26'; Tronchin 56'; Coulibaly (yellow card) 82'		Portanova 59'	Stadium: Stadio Druso; Attendance: 4,135; Referee: Matteo Marcenaro

30 September 2025 6	Reggiana	1–1	Spezia	Reggio Emilia
20:30 UTC+2	Girma 61', (yellow card) 90+3'; Portanova (yellow card) 74'; Reinhart (yellow card) 78'; Tavşan (yellow card) 84'; Libutti (yellow card) 87'		Lapadula 26'; Hristov (red card) 52'; Cistana (yellow card) 53'	Stadium: Mapei Stadium – Città del Tricolore; Attendance: 8,796; Referee: Andrea Zanotti

4 October 2025 7	Cesena	1–2	Reggiana	Cesena
18:30 UTC+2	Ciervo 15', (yellow card) 53'; Berti (yellow card) 70'; Bastoni (red card) 87'		Bonetti (yellow card) 13'; Tavşan 19'; Portanova 24'; Motta (yellow card) 46'; Reinhart (yellow card) 50'	Stadium: Stadio Dino Manuzzi; Attendance: 11,703; Referee: Michael Fabbri

18 October 2025 8	Reggiana	3–1	Bari	Reggio Emilia
14:00 UTC+2	Papetti (yellow card) 27'; Marras (yellow card) 39'; Tavşan 45+2'; Bozzolan 70'; Charlys (yellow card) 80'; Lambourde 81'		Meroni (yellow card) 38'; Moncini 41'; Nikolaou (red card) 59'	Stadium: Mapei Stadium – Città del Tricolore; Attendance: 9,071; Referee: Maria Sole Ferrieri Caputi

25 October 2025 9	Monza	3–1	Reggiana	Monza
14:00 UTC+2	Mota 3', 43'; Izzo 25', (yellow card) 26'; Baldé (yellow card) 29'		Novakovich 13'; Lambourde (yellow card) 16'; Marras (yellow card) 21'; Papetti (yellow card) 76'	Stadium: Stadio Brianteo; Attendance: 5,513; Referee: Francesco Fourneau

28 October 2025 10	Reggiana	1–0	Modena	Reggio Emilia
20:30 UTC+2	Bozzolan 17'; Charlys (yellow card) 64'; Bonetti (yellow card) 90+3'		Nieling (yellow card) 61'; Di Mariano (yellow card) 70'; Tonoli (yellow card) 90+4'	Stadium: Mapei Stadium – Città del Tricolore; Attendance: 14,719; Referee: Antonio Rapuano

1 November 2025 11	Avellino	4–3	Reggiana	Avellino
13:30 UTC+2	Biasci (yellow card) 25', (goal) 50'; Insigne 32' (pen.); Palmiero (yellow card) 47'; Milani (yellow card) 57'; Šimić 64'; Palumbo 70'; Missori (yellow card) 86'		Šimić 21' (o.g.); Novakovich 55', 62'; Portanova (yellow card) 67'; Gondo (yellow card) 90+3'	Stadium: Stadio Partenio-Adriano Lombardi; Attendance: 9,428; Referee: Luca Massimi

8 November 2025 12	Reggiana	0–0	Virtus Entella	Reggio Emilia
15:00 UTC+2	Magnani (yellow card) 29'; Marras (yellow card) 66'		Marconi (yellow card) 57'	Stadium: Mapei Stadium – Città del Tricolore; Attendance: 8,239; Referee: Marco Piccinini

22 November 2025 13	Carrerese	0–0	Reggiana	Carrara
15:00 UTC+2	Rubino (yellow card) 69'		Rover (yellow card) 29'; Girma (yellow card) 35'; Papetti (yellow card) 46'; Bertagnoli (yellow card) 52'; Magnani (yellow card) 57'	Stadium: Stadio dei Marmi; Attendance: 2,956; Referee: Daniele Perenzoni

29 November 2025 14	Reggiana	0–1	Frosinone	Reggio Emilia
15:00 UTC+2	Gondo (yellow card) 76'		Oyono (yellow card) 10'; Koutsoupias 56', (yellow card) 76'; Monterisi (yellow card) 73'	Stadium: Mapei Stadium – Città del Tricolore; Attendance: 7,850; Referee: Simone Galipò

8 December 2025 15	Mantova	0–1	Reggiana	Mantua
15:00 UTC+2	Cella (yellow card) 40'; Bonfanti (yellow card) 75'		Bozzolan (yellow card) 25'; Reinhart 53', (yellow card) 60'; Bonetti (yellow card) 83'; Charlys (red card) 89'	Stadium: Stadio Danilo Martelli; Attendance: 7,890; Referee: Luca Massimi

13 December 2025 16	Reggiana	1–2	Padova	Reggio Emilia
15:00 UTC+2	Marras (yellow card) 35'; Reinhart 49'; Papetti (yellow card) 88'		Sgarbi 36'; Harder (yellow card) 59'; Seghetti 76'; Faedo (yellow card) 88'; Baselli (yellow card) 90+1'	Stadium: Mapei Stadium – Città del Tricolore; Attendance: 9,053; Referee: Claudio Giuseppe Allegretta

20 December 2025 17	Pescara	2–1	Reggiana	Pescara
19:30 UTC+2	Gravillon (yellow card) 4'; Corazza 11'; Olzer 61'		Rozzio (yellow card) 2'; Rover 15'; Portanova (yellow card) 45+2'; Vallarelli (yellow card) 48'; Bozzolan (yellow card) 54'	Stadium: Stadio Adriatico; Attendance: 5,588; Referee: Ermanno Feliciani

27 December 2025 18	Sampdoria	2–1	Reggiana	Genoa
15:00 UTC+2	Depaoli (yellow card) 20'; Conti 26'; Hadžikadunić (yellow card) 45+2'; Barák 88'; Ferrari (yellow card) 90+4'		Portanova 14', (yellow card) 41'; Reinhart (yellow card) 24'; Rover (yellow card) 52'; Lambourde (yellow card) 76'; Magnani (yellow card) 90+8'; Gondo (red card) 90+8'	Stadium: Stadio Luigi Ferraris; Attendance: 24,716; Referee: Giuseppe Collu

10 January 2026 19	Reggiana	1–3	Venezia	Reggio Emilia
15:00 UTC+2	Girma 39', (yellow card) 45+4'		Adorante 21'; Yeboah 34' (pen.); Svoboda 57'; Schingtienne (red card) 69'; Venturi (yellow card) 90+5'	Stadium: Mapei Stadium – Città del Tricolore; Attendance: 8,124; Referee: Niccolò Turrini

17 January 2026 20	Reggiana	1–2	Cesena	Reggio Emilia
17:15 UTC+2	Portanova 27'; Charlys (yellow card) 29'; Rozzio (yellow card) 90'		Ciofi (yellow card) 21'; Shpendi 30' (pen.), 63'; Zaro (yellow card) 42'; Magni (yellow card) 90+1'	Stadium: Mapei Stadium – Città del Tricolore; Attendance: 7,745; Referee: Simone Galipò

24 January 2026 21	Frosinone	1–0	Reggiana	Frosinone
15:00 UTC+2	Kvernadze 57'; Gelli (yellow card) 69'; Bracaglia (yellow card) 79'		Reinhart (yellow card) 23'; Rover (yellow card) 39'; Charlys (yellow card) 74'	Stadium: Stadio Benito Stirpe; Attendance: 10,706; Referee: Maria Sole Ferrieri Caputi

1 February 2026 22	Reggiana	1–1	Juve Stabia	Reggio Emilia
15:00 UTC+2	Gondo 30'; Portanova (yellow card) 63'; Papetti (yellow card) 71'		Mosti 2'; Giorgini (yellow card) 40'	Stadium: Mapei Stadium – Città del Tricolore; Attendance: 7,702; Referee: Ermanno Feliciani

7 February 2026 23	Catanzaro	2–0	Reggiana	Catanzaro
15:00 UTC+2	Liberali 29'; D'Alessandro 52'; Nuamah (yellow card) 72'		Bozzolan (yellow card) 36'; Papetti (yellow card) 39'; Novakovich (yellow card) 83'	Stadium: Stadio Nicola Ceravolo; Attendance: 7,696; Referee: Mario Perri

10 February 2026 24	Reggiana	1–0	Mantova	Reggio Emilia
20:00 UTC+2	Charlys 9'; Novakovich (yellow card) 28'; Girma (yellow card) 39'; Bozzolan (yellow card) 90+2'; Rozzio (yellow card) 90+6'		Meroni (yellow card) 65'; Kouda (yellow card) 88'; Cella (yellow card) 90+6'	Stadium: Mapei Stadium – Città del Tricolore; Attendance: 9,322; Referee: Claudio Giuseppe Allegretta

15 February 2026 25	Empoli	1–1	Reggiana	Empoli
17:15 UTC+2	Popov (yellow card) 47'; Innocenti (yellow card) 65'; Shpendi 72'; Guarino (yellow card) 90'; Curto (yellow card) 90+4'		Girma 26' (pen.); Reinhart (yellow card) 31'; Fumagalli (yellow card) 90+7'	Stadium: Stadio Carlo Castellani; Attendance: 6,378; Referee: Daniele Perenzoni

22 February 2026 26	Reggiana	1–1	Avellino	Reggio Emilia
17:15 UTC+2	Portanova 5', (yellow card) 22'; Charlys (yellow card) 50'		Enrici 29'; Sounas (yellow card) 32'	Stadium: Mapei Stadium – Città del Tricolore; Attendance: 10,102; Referee: Paride Tremolada

28 February 2026 27	Spezia	0–1	Reggiana	La Spezia
17:15 UTC+2	Matějů (yellow card) 10'; Bellemo (yellow card) 29'; Vignali (yellow card) 74'; Bandinelli (yellow card) 90+4'		Novakovich 40'; Lusuardi (yellow card) 45+1'; Bertagnoli (yellow card) 74'; Girma (yellow card) 87'	Stadium: Stadio Alberto Picco; Attendance: 8,565; Referee: Luca Zufferli

3 March 2026 28	Reggiana	0–4	Südtirol	Reggio Emilia
20:00 UTC+2	Sampirisi (yellow card) 52'		Kofler 39'; Pecorino (yellow card) 47', (goal) 83'; Casiraghi 86'; Merkaj 90+3'	Stadium: Mapei Stadium – Città del Tricolore; Attendance: 8,031; Referee: Andrea Zanotti

7 March 2026 29	Venezia	2–0	Reggiana	Venice
17:15 UTC+2	Haps 15', (yellow card) 39'; Doumbia 71'			Stadium: Stadio Pier Luigi Penzo; Attendance: 10,396; Referee: Daniele Chiffi

14 March 2026 30	Bari	4–1	Reggiana	Bari
15:00 UTC+2	Artioli 10', (yellow card) 16'; Rao 15', 48'; Maggiore (yellow card) 42'; Moncini 57'		Quaranta (yellow card) 18'; Girma (yellow card) 49'; Charlys (yellow card) 70'; Bozhanaj (yellow card) 86'; Lusuardi 89'	Stadium: Stadio San Nicola; Attendance: 10,123; Referee: Luca Pairetto

17 March 2026 31	Reggiana	0–0	Monza	Reggio Emilia
20:00 UTC+2	Reinhart (yellow card) 58'			Stadium: Mapei Stadium – Città del Tricolore; Attendance: 8,026; Referee: Giuseppe Mucera

22 March 2026 32	Virtus Entella	3–0	Reggiana	Chiavari
19:30 UTC+2	Franzoni 5'; Marconi (yellow card) 61', (goal) 65'; Benedetti (yellow card) 77'; Cuppone 82'		Libutti (yellow card) 23'; Papetti (yellow card) 48'; Novakovich (red card) 57'; Micai (yellow card) 65'; Lusuardi (yellow card) 70'; Rover (yellow card) 76'; Fumagalli (yellow card) 86'	Stadium: Stadio Enrico Sannazzari; Attendance: 2,257; Referee: Simone Sozza

6 April 2026 33	Reggiana	1–3	Pescara	Reggio Emilia
14:00 UTC+2	Lambourde 68'; Tripaldelli (red card) 90+6'		Olzer 21'; Insigne 50', (yellow card) 63'; Berardi (yellow card) 68'; Meazzi 89'; Gravillon (yellow card) 90+1'	Stadium: Mapei Stadium – Città del Tricolore; Attendance: 9,005; Referee: Livio Marinelli

12 April 2026 34	Reggiana	2–0	Carrarese	Reggio Emilia
18:30 UTC+2	Portanova 14'; Bertagnoli 28'; Reinhart (yellow card) 51'		Calabrese (yellow card) 23'; Hasa (yellow card) 85'; Zanon (yellow card) 90'	Stadium: Mapei Stadium – Città del Tricolore; Attendance: 8,967; Referee: Luca Massimi

19 April 2026 35	Padova	1–0	Reggiana	Padua
16:15 UTC+2	Seghetti 80'		Reinhart (yellow card) 24'; Bonetti (yellow card) 50'	Stadium: Stadio Euganeo; Attendance: 10,951; Referee: Giuseppe Mucera

25 April 2026 36	Reggiana	1–1	Palermo	Reggio Emilia
14:00 UTC+2	Lambourde 21'; Micai (yellow card) 31'; Papetti (red card) 83'; Lusuardi (yellow card) 89'; Rover (yellow card) 90'		Palumbo (yellow card) 11', (goal) 30'	Stadium: Mapei Stadium; Attendance: 10,403; Referee: Ermanno Feliciani

1 May 2026 37	Modena	2–1	Reggiana	Modena
14:00 UTC+2	Zampano 13', (yellow card) 14'; Ambrosino 56', (yellow card) 57' (red card) 69'; Santoro (yellow card) 76'		Bonetti (yellow card) 35'; Belardinelli (yellow card) 56'; Vicari 65'; Portanova (yellow card) 85'	Stadium: Stadio Alberto Braglia; Attendance: 12,357; Referee: Rosario Abisso

8 May 2026 38	Reggiana	1–0	Sampdoria	Reggio Emilia
19:30 UTC+2	Gondo (yellow card) 43'; Reinhart (yellow card) 75'; Novakovich 76'		Depaoli (yellow card) 32'	Stadium: Mapei Stadium – Città del Tricolore; Attendance: 11,514; Referee: Marco Guida

=== Coppa Italia ===
15 August 2025 Round of 64	Empoli	1–1 (3–0 p)	Reggiana	Empoli
18:00	Ilie 64'		Gondo 13'	Stadium: Stadio Carlo Castellani; Attendance: 1,894; Referee: Andrea Calzavara
	Penalties
	(penalty scored) Belardinelli; (penalty scored) Elia; (penalty missed) Carboni; (penalty scored) Busiello		(penalty missed) Gondo; (penalty missed) Marras; (penalty missed) Rover
