= 2023–24 AC Reggiana 1919 season =

AC Reggiana 1919
2023–24 season
- Manager: Alessandro Nesta
- Stadium: Mapei Stadium – Città del Tricolore
- Serie B: 11th
- Coppa Italia: Round of 32
- Top goalscorer: League: Cedric Gondo (6); All: Cedric Gondo (6)
- Biggest win: Feralpisalò 0–3 Reggiana
- Biggest defeat: Ternana 3–0 Reggiana

The 2023–24 season was AC Reggiana 1919's 104th season in existence and the club's fifth season since being re-formed in 2018. In addition to the domestic league, AC Reggiana 1919 participated in this season's edition of the Coppa Italia. The season covers the period from 1 July 2023 to 30 June 2024.

== Players ==
=== First-team squad ===
As of 8 September 2023

Note: Flags indicate national team as defined under FIFA eligibility rules; some limited exceptions apply. Players may hold more than one non-FIFA nationality.

No.	Pos.	Nation	Player
1	GK	ITA	Alex Sposito
3	DF	ITA	Edoardo Pieragnolo (on loan from Sassuolo)
4	DF	ITA	Paolo Rozzio (captain)
7	FW	POR	Muhamed Varela
8	MF	ITA	Luca Cigarini
9	FW	ITA	Luca Vido
10	FW	ITA	Eric Lanini (on loan from Parma)
11	FW	CIV	Cedric Gondo (on loan from Cremonese)
12	GK	ITA	Giacomo Satalino (on loan from Sassuolo)
14	MF	NGR	Shaibu Nuhu
15	DF	ITA	Riccardo Fiamozzi
17	DF	ITA	Lorenzo Libutti
19	DF	ITA	Filippo Romagna (on loan from Sassuolo)
21	MF	ITA	Jacopo Da Riva (on loan from Atalanta)
22	GK	ITA	Francesco Bardi

No.	Pos.	Nation	Player
23	FW	ITA	Stefano Pettinari
24	MF	ITA	Filippo Nardi (on loan from Cremonese)
25	DF	POL	Przemysław Szymiński (on loan from Frosinone)
27	DF	ITA	Alessandro Marcandalli (on loan from Genoa)
28	FW	FRA	Janis Antiste (on loan from Sassuolo)
29	DF	CRO	Marko Pajač (on loan from Genoa)
30	MF	ITA	Antonio Vergara (on loan from Napoli)
31	DF	ITA	Mario Sampirisi
33	MF	SLO	Domen Črnigoj (on loan from Venezia)
42	MF	ITA	Alessandro Bianco (on loan from Fiorentina)
72	MF	ITA	Filippo Melegoni (on loan from Genoa)
77	MF	ALB	Elvis Kabashi
80	MF	SUI	Natan Girma
90	MF	ITA	Manolo Portanova (on loan from Genoa)

=== Out on loan ===
Note: Flags indicate national team as defined under FIFA eligibility rules; some limited exceptions apply. Players may hold more than one non-FIFA nationality.

No.	Pos.	Nation	Player
—	DF	POR	André Duarte (at Osijek until 30 June 2024)

== Transfers ==
=== In ===
Pos.	Player	Transferred from	Fee	Date	Source

=== Out ===
Pos.	Player	Transferred to	Fee	Date	Source

== Pre-season and friendlies ==
Win Draw Loss Fixtures

26 July 2023 Friendly	Reggiana (Italy)	4–1	(Italy) AlbinoLeffe
17:20 CEST (UTC+2)

== Competitions ==
=== Overview ===
Competition	First match	Last match	Starting round	Final position	Record							
Competition	First match	Last match	Starting round	Final position	Pld	W	D	L	GF	GA	GD	Win %
Serie B	20 August 2023	10 May 2024	Matchday 1		35	9	16	10	36	43	−7	25.71
Coppa Italia	6 August 2023	1 November 2023	Preliminary round	Round of 32	3	2	0	1	9	5	+4	66.67
Total					38	11	16	11	45	48	−3	28.95

Last updated: 27 April 2024
Source: Competitions

=== Serie B ===
==== League table ====
Pos	Team	Pld	W	D	L	GF	GA	GD	Pts
9	Cosenza	38	11	14	13	47	42	+5	47 (Note: Head-to-head points: Cosenza 11, Modena 11, Reggiana 7, Südtirol 3. Head-to-head goal difference: Cosenza +6, Modena +2.)
10	Modena	38	10	17	11	41	47	−6	47
11	Reggiana	38	10	17	11	38	45	−7	47
12	Südtirol	38	12	11	15	46	48	−2	47
13	Pisa	38	11	13	14	51	54	−3	46 (Note: Pisa finished ahead of Cittadella on head-to-head points: Pisa 2–1 Cittadella, Cittadella 0–1 Pisa.)

Source: Soccerway (in English)
Rules for classification: 1) Points; 2) Head-to-head points; 3) Head-to-head goal difference; 4) Goal difference; 5) Goals scored; 6) Draw.
(Note: Head-to-head record is used only after all the matches between the teams in question have been played)

==== Results summary ====
Overall								Home						Away					
Pld	W	D	L	GF	GA	GD	Pts	W	D	L	GF	GA	GD	W	D	L	GF	GA	GD
30	7	16	7	31	33	−2	37	2	10	3	14	17	−3	5	6	4	17	16	+1

Last updated: 16 March 2024.

==== Results by round ====
Round	1
Ground	
Result	
Position	

Updated to match(es) played on 28 October 2023. Source:
A = Away; H = Home; W = Win; D = Draw; L = Loss

==== Matches ====
The league fixtures were unveiled on 11 July 2023.

11 November 2023 13	Cosenza	2–0	Reggiana	Cosenza
14:00	Voca 23'; Tutino (penalty missed) 83', 83'			Stadium: Stadio San Vito-Gigi Marulla; Referee: Niccolo Baroni

25 November 2023 14	Reggiana	1–1	Ascoli	Reggio Emilia
14:00				Stadium: Mapei Stadium – Città del Tricolore; Referee: Maria Sole Ferrieri Caputi

2 December 2023 15	Modena	2–1	Reggiana	Modena
14:00				Stadium: Stadio Alberto Braglia; Referee: Rosario Abisso

10 December 2023 16	Reggiana	1–1	Brescia	Reggio Emilia
16:15				Stadium: Mapei Stadium – Città del Tricolore; Referee: Daniele Rutella

16 December 2023 17	Reggiana	1–2	Sampdoria	Reggio Emilia
14:00				Stadium: Mapei Stadium – Città del Tricolore; Referee: Francesco Fourneau

23 December 2023 18	Südtirol	2–3	Reggiana	Bolzano
16:15				Stadium: Stadio Druso; Referee: Marco Di Bello

26 December 2023 19	Reggiana	1–0	Catanzaro	Reggio Emilia
12:30	Girma 41'			Stadium: Mapei Stadium – Città del Tricolore; Referee: Giacomo Camplone

13 January 2024 20	Pisa	2–2	Reggiana	Pisa
16:15				Stadium: Arena Garibaldi

20 January 2024 21	Reggiana	2–2	Como	Reggio Emilia
14:00				Stadium: Mapei Stadium – Città del Tricolore; Referee: Ivano Pezzuto

27 January 2024 22	Bari	0–2	Reggiana	Bari
16:15				Stadium: Stadio San Nicola; Referee: Davide Di Marco

3 February 2024 23	Reggiana	1–1	FeralpiSalò	Reggio Emilia
14:00				Stadium: Mapei Stadium – Città del Tricolore; Referee: Luca Massimi

10 February 2024 24	Cremonese	1–1	Reggiana	Cremona
14:00				Stadium: Stadio Giovanni Zini; Referee: Michael Fabbri

17 February 2024 25	Reggiana	0–2	Ternana	Reggio Emilia
14:00				Stadium: Mapei Stadium – Città del Tricolore; Referee: Marco Monaldi

24 February 2024 26	Brescia	0–0	Reggiana	Brescia
14:00				Stadium: Stadio Mario Rigamonti

27 February 2024 27	Reggiana	1–1	Südtirol	Reggio Emilia
18:15				Stadium: Mapei Stadium – Città del Tricolore; Referee: Giacomo Camplone

3 March 2024 28	Ascoli	0–0	Reggiana	Ascoli Piceno
16:15				Stadium: Stadio Cino e Lillo Del Duca; Referee: Matteo Gualtieri

9 March 2024 29	Catanzaro	0–1	Reggiana	Catanzaro
16:15				Stadium: Stadio Nicola Ceravolo; Referee: Kevin Bonacina

16 March 2024 30	Reggiana	0–0	Spezia	Reggio Emilia
16:15				Stadium: Mapei Stadium – Città del Tricolore; Referee: Antonio Santoro

1 April 2024 31	Venezia	2–3	Reggiana	Venice
15:00				Stadium: Stadio Pier Luigi Penzo

13 April 2024 33	Lecco	1–0	Reggiana	Lecco
16:15 CEST (UTC+2)	Ioniță 60'	Report		Stadium: Stadio Rigamonti-Ceppi; Referee: Daniele Minelli

27 April 2024 35	Palermo	1–2	Reggiana	Palermo
16:15 CEST (UTC+2)	Brunori 35'	Report	Portanova 52'; Rozzio 66'	Stadium: Stadio Renzo Barbera; Referee: Daniele Perenzoni

1 May 2024 36	Reggiana	v	Modena	Reggio Emilia
18:00 CEST (UTC+2)				Stadium: Mapei Stadium – Città del Tricolore

5 May 2024 37	Sampdoria	v	Reggiana	Genoa
15:00 CEST (UTC+2)				Stadium: Stadio Luigi Ferraris

10 May 2024 38	Reggiana	v	Parma	Reggio Emilia
20:30 CEST (UTC+2)				Stadium: Mapei Stadium – Città del Tricolore

=== Coppa Italia ===
6 August 2023 Preliminary round	Reggiana	6–2	Pescara	Chiavari
18:00 CEST (UTC+2)				Stadium: Stadio Comunale; Attendance: 1,403; Referee: Davide Di Marco

13 August 2023 Preliminary round	Monza	1–2	Reggiana	Monza
21:15 CEST (UTC+2)				Stadium: Stadio Brianteo; Attendance: 8,178; Referee: Alberto Santoro

1 November 2023 Round of 32	Genoa	2–1 (a.e.t.)	Reggiana	Genoa
15:00 CET (UTC+1)	Matturro (yellow card) 18'; Haps 53'; Frendrup (yellow card) 59'; Guðmundsson 99'	Report	Djamanca 37'; Nardi (yellow card) 50'; Cigarini (yellow card) 115'	Stadium: Stadio Luigi Ferraris; Attendance: 12,427; Referee: Alberto Santoro
