= Edoardo Motta =

Italian footballer (born 2005)

Personal information
- Date of birth: 13 January 2005 (age 21)
- Place of birth: Biella, Italy
- Height: 1.94 m (6 ft 4 in)
- Position: Goalkeeper

Team information
- Current team: Lazio
- Number: 40

Youth career
- 2015–2016: ASD Soccer Spartera
- 2016–2024: Juventus
- 2021–2022: → Alessandria (loan)
- 2022–2023: → Monza (loan)
- 2023–2024: → Reggiana (loan)

Senior career*
Years	Team	Apps	(Gls)
2024–2026	Reggiana	22	(0)
2026–	Lazio	9	(0)

International career^{‡}
2021	Italy U17	1	(0)
2025–	Italy U21	1	(0)
- * Club domestic league appearances and goals as of 23:59, 9 May 2026 (UTC) ‡ National team caps and goals as of 15:13, 28 January 2026 (UTC)

Edoardo Motta (born 13 January 2005) is an Italian professional footballer who plays as a goalkeeper for Serie A club Lazio.

== Club career ==
A youth product of ASD Soccer Spartera, Motta joined the youth academy of Juventus on 9 June 2016. He joined U17s of Alessandria on a season-long loan on 3 August 2021. On 20 June 2022, he went on a season-long loan to the Monza U18s. He spent the 2023–24 season on a loan with the Primavera team of Reggiana. On 10 July 2024, he transferred to Reggiana on a 2-year contract, with Juventus retaining a sell-on clause. He made his senior and professional debut with Reggiana in a 1–0 Coppa Italia loss to Genoa on 9 August 2024.

On 27 January 2026 Motta transferred to Serie A club Lazio on a contract until 2030. On 22 April 2026, in the second leg semi-final of the 2025–26 Coppa Italia against Atalanta, Motta saved four penalties in the resulting 2–1 shoot-out win to send Lazio to the final.

== International career ==
Motta is a former youth international for Italy. He was called up to the Italy U21 for a set of 2027 UEFA European Under-21 Championship qualification matches in November 2025.

== Career statistics ==
As of match played 13 May 2026

Appearances and goals by club, season and competition
Club	Season	League			National cup		Europe		Other		Total	
Club	Season	Division	Apps	Goals	Apps	Goals	Apps	Goals	Apps	Goals	Apps	Goals
Reggiana	2023–24	Serie B	0	0	0	0	—		—		0	0
Reggiana	2024–25	Serie B	2	0	1	0	—		—		3	0
Reggiana	2025–26	Serie B	20	0	1	0	—		—		21	0
Reggiana	Total		22	0	2	0	—		—		24	0
Lazio	2025–26	Serie A	9	0	2	0	—		—		11	0
Career total			31	0	4	0	0	0	0	0	35	0
