= Giangiacomo Magnani =

Italian footballer

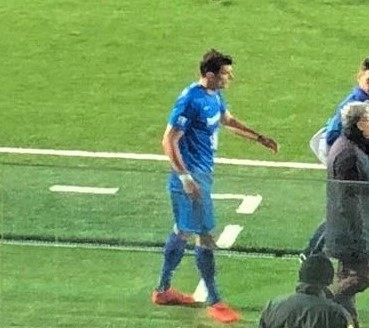

Personal information
- Date of birth: 4 October 1995 (age 31)
- Place of birth: Correggio, Italy
- Height: 1.91 m (6 ft 3 in)
- Position: Defender

Team information
- Current team: Palermo
- Number: 96

Youth career
- Correggese
- –2014: Reggiana
- 2014: → Padova (loan)

Senior career*
Years	Team	Apps	(Gls)
2014–2015	Virtus Verona	26	(2)
2015–2017	Lumezzane	28	(1)
2017–2018	Siracusa	19	(1)
2018	Perugia	15	(0)
2018	Juventus	0	(0)
2018–2021	Sassuolo	27	(1)
2019–2020	→ Brescia (loan)	2	(0)
2020–2021	→ Hellas Verona (loan)	25	(0)
2021–2025	Hellas Verona	88	(1)
2022	→ Sampdoria (loan)	4	(0)
2025–	Palermo	26	(0)
2025–2026	→ Reggiana (loan)	11	(0)
- * Club domestic league appearances and goals as of 12 May 2026

Giangiacomo Magnani (born 4 October 1995) is an Italian professional footballer who plays as a defender for Serie B club Palermo.

== Career ==
Sassuolo acquired Magnani from Juventus on 27 July 2018, where he stayed one month.

On 31 January 2020, his loan to Brescia was terminated by mutual consent.

On 2 September 2020, Magnani joined Hellas Verona on loan until 30 June 2021, with a conditional obligation to buy.

On 16 January 2022, he joined Sampdoria on loan.

On 28 January 2025, Magnani signed a multi-year contract with Palermo. After missing out on the entire pre-season due to family-related issues, Magnani was loaned out to fellow Serie B club Reggiana on 29 August 2025. The loan was terminated early on 14 January 2026.

== Career statistics ==
As of match played 3 November 2024

Appearances and goals by club, season and competition
Club	Season	League			Cup		Europe		Other		Total	
Club	Season	Division	Apps	Goals	Apps	Goals	Apps	Goals	Apps	Goals	Apps	Goals
Virtus Verona	2014–15	Serie D	26	2	—		—		1 (Note: Appearances in Serie D-Promotion play-offs)	0	27	2
Lumezzane	2015–16	Lega Pro	10	0	1 (Note: Appearances in Coppa Italia Lega Pro)	0	—		—		11	0
Lumezzane	2016–17	Lega Pro	18	1	2	0	—		—		20	1
Lumezzane	Total		28	1	3	0	—		—		31	1
Siracusa	2017–18	Serie C	19	1	0	0	—		—		19	1
Perugia	2017–18	Serie B	15	0	—		—		1 (Note: Appearance in Serie B-Promotion play-offs)	0	16	0
Sassuolo	2018–19	Serie A	19	0	3	0	—		—		22	0
Sassuolo	2019–20	Serie A	8	1	—		—		—		8	0
Sassuolo	Total		27	1	3	0	—		—		30	1
Brescia (loan)	2019–20	Serie A	2	0	1	0	—		—		3	0
Hellas Verona (loan)	2020–21	Serie A	25	0	1	0	—		—		26	0
Hellas Verona	2021–22	Serie A	14	0	1	0	—		—		15	0
Hellas Verona	2022–23	Serie A	24	0	1	0	—		1 (Note: Appearance in Serie A relegation tie-breaker)	0	26	0
Hellas Verona	2023–24	Serie A	33	0	2	0	—		—		35	0
Hellas Verona	2024–25	Serie A	17	1	1	0	—		—		18	1
Hellas Verona	Total		106	1	6	0	—		1	0	113	1
Sampdoria (loan)	2021–22	Serie A	4	0	1	0	—		—		5	0
Palermo	2024–25	Serie B	13	0	0	0	—		—		13	0
Reggiana (loan)	2025–26	Serie B	4	0	0	0	—		—		4	0
Career total			251	6	14	0	0	0	3	0	268	6
