= Minel Šabotić =

Montenegrin footballer

Personal information
- Date of birth: 20 January 1994 (age 32)
- Height: 1.86 m (6 ft 1 in)
- Position: Defender

Team information
- Current team: Lentigione
- Number: 13

Youth career
- 2010–2011: Sassuolo

Senior career*
Years	Team	Apps	(Gls)
2011–2013	Rolo		
2013–2014	Correggese	29	(1)
2014–2017	Reggiana	71	(1)
2017–2018	Pisa	14	(1)
2018–2019	AlbinoLeffe	14	(0)
2019–2021	Carpi	59	(2)
2021–2022	Pistoiese	14	(0)
2022	Carrarese	8	(0)
2022–	Lentigione	37	(1)
- * Club domestic league appearances and goals as of 20 December 2023

Minel Šabotić (born 20 January 1994) is a Montenegrin footballer who plays as a defender for Italian Serie D club Lentigione.

== Club career ==
Born in Montenegro (by then part of FR Yugoslavia), Šabotić was a youth product of Italian club Sassuolo, based in Sassuolo, in the Province of Modena. The stadium of the first team was located in Mapei Stadium – Città del Tricolore, Reggio Emilia.

In 2011–12 and 2012–13 season Šabotić was a player of Rolo, in Eccellenza Emilia–Romagna (Italian regional football league). In 2013, he was signed by Serie D club Correggese, also located within the Province of Reggio Emilia.

On 30 July 2014 he was signed by Lega Pro club Reggiana in a 3-year contract. Sabotić made 29 league appearances for the Reggio Emilia-based club.

On 8 October 2015 Šabotić signed a new 3-year contract, along with his defensive teammate Alessandro Spanò.

On 2 August 2019, he signed a 2-year contract with Carpi.

On 16 August 2021, he signed a one-year deal with Pistoiese in Serie C. On 28 January 2022, he moved to Carrarese.
