= Elayis Tavşan =

Dutch footballer (born 2001)

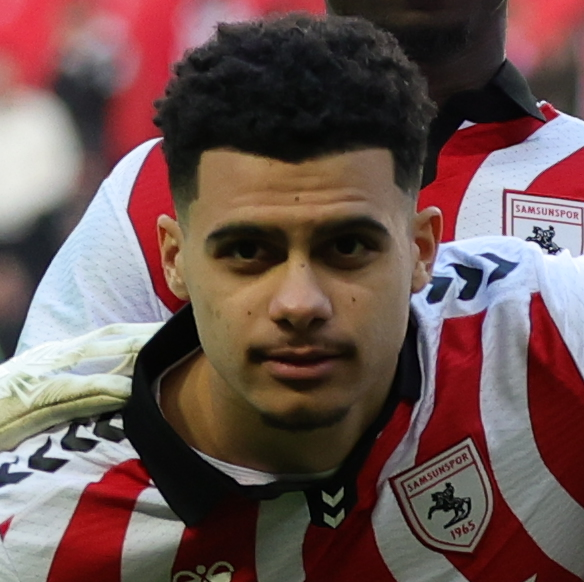
- Tavşan in 2026

Personal information
- Date of birth: 30 April 2001 (age 25)
- Place of birth: Rotterdam, Netherlands
- Height: 1.83 m (6 ft 0 in)
- Position: Right winger

Team information
- Current team: Samsunspor
- Number: 7

Youth career
- –2008: Victoria '04
- 2008–2018: Sparta Rotterdam

Senior career*
Years	Team	Apps	(Gls)
2018–2019	Jong Sparta Rotterdam	25	(11)
2018–2020	Sparta Rotterdam	1	(0)
2019–2020	→ Telstar (loan)	22	(7)
2020–2024	NEC	107	(21)
2024–2026	Hellas Verona	3	(0)
2024–2025	→ Cesena (loan)	28	(4)
2025–2026	→ Reggiana (loan)	18	(3)
2026–	Samsunspor	15	(2)

International career^{‡}
2018	Netherlands U17	10	(0)
2018–2019	Netherlands U18	6	(0)
2019	Netherlands U19	7	(0)
2022–2023	Netherlands U21	10	(4)
Medal record
Representing Netherlands
UEFA European Under-17 Championship
Winner	England 2018	U-17 Team
- * Club domestic league appearances and goals as of 10 June 2026 ‡ National team caps and goals as of 27 June 2023

Elayis Tavşan (born 30 April 2001) is a Dutch professional footballer who plays as right winger for Turkish Süper Lig club Samsunspor.

== Club career ==
On 19 August 2019, he joined Telstar on a season-long loan. On 15 June 2020, he signed a three-year contract with NEC with an option for an additional season. He made his debut against Jong Ajax in the second matchday of the season. He played 84 minutes, after which he was substituted for Thomas Beekman. The match after that, he scored his first goal for the club, in the 3–1 away match against FC Volendam.

On 23 January 2024, Tavşan signed for Serie A club Hellas Verona. On 30 August 2024, he was loaned to Cesena in Serie B.

On 15 July 2025, his loan move to Serie B side AC Reggiana was announced. On 16 January 2026, the loan to Reggiana was terminated early.

On the same day, Tavşan signed a four-and-a-half-year contract with Samsunspor in Turkey.

== Personal life ==
Born in the Netherlands, Tavşan is of Turkish and Surinamese descent. The Dutch footballer also became a Turkish citizen in February 2026.

== Honours ==
Netherlands U17

- UEFA European Under-17 Championship: 2018

Individual

- Eredivisie Talent of the Month: October 2021

== Career statistics ==
As of match played 26 May 2024

Appearances and goals by club, season and competition
Club	Season	League			Cup		Other		Total	
Club	Season	Division	Apps	Goals	Apps	Goals	Apps	Goals	Apps	Goals
Sparta Rotterdam	2018–19	Eerste Divisie	1	0	—		0	0	1	0
Telstar (loan)	2019–20	Eerste Divisie	22	7	1	0	—		23	7
NEC	2021–22	Eerste Divisie	37	11	2	0	0	0	39	11
NEC	2021–22	Eredivisie	30	5	4	2	—		34	7
NEC	2022–23	Eredivisie	32	3	3	1	—		35	4
NEC	2023–24	Eredivisie	8	2	2	1	—		14	4
NEC	Total		107	21	11	4	0	0	118	25
Hellas Verona	2023–24	Serie A	3	0	—		—		3	0
Hellas Verona	2024–25	Serie A	0	0	1	0	—		1	0
Cesena (loan)	2024–25	Serie B	28	4	2	0	1	0	31	4
Reggiana (loan)	2025–26	Serie B	10	3	1	0	—		11	3
Career total			171	35	16	4	1	0	188	39
