= Andrea Parola =

Italian footballer (born 1979)

Personal information
- Date of birth: 22 April 1979 (age 47)
- Place of birth: Pisa, Italy
- Height: 1.79 m (5 ft 10 1/2 in)
- Position: Midfielder

Senior career*
Years	Team	Apps	(Gls)
1997–2003	Pisa	33	(0)
1999–2000	→ Poggibonsi (loan)	17	(2)
2000–2001	→ Naftex Burgas (loan)	22	(2)
2002–2003	→ Grosseto (loan)	32	(1)
2003–2005	Triestina	65	(0)
2005–2006	Ascoli	32	(0)
2006–2007	Sampdoria	21	(0)
2007–2010	Cagliari	73	(1)
2011	Novara	10	(1)
2011–2012	Piacenza	16	(1)
2012	Nocerina	13	(0)
2012–2016	Reggiana 1919	82	(0)
2016–2017	Sistiana		
2017–2018	Kras Repen	16	(0)
- * Club domestic league appearances and goals

Andrea Parola (born 22 April 1979) is an Italian former professional footballer who played as a midfielder.

== Football career ==
He started his career at native club Pisa Calcio at Serie C2. He was loaned to Serie D side Poggibonsi in summer 1999, and then to Bulgarian A PFG team Naftex Burgas in summer 2000. He returned to Pisa in summer 2001, this time at Serie C1, before loaned out again at Grosseto of Serie C2.

He was signed by Triestina of Serie B in summer 2003 in co-ownership deal, and Triestina took over the full ownership a year later.

On 24 August 2005, he was spotted by newly promoted team Ascoli, and made his Serie A debut four days later, against A.C. Milan on 28 August. After impressing performances in first half of the 2005–06 season, Udinese Calcio bought half of Parola's right in January 2006, and kept Parola on loan at Acsoli.

But at the end of season, Ascoli bought back half of the right and sold all the rights to Sampdoria. His teammate Fabio Quagliarella also sold from Udinese. He joined Cagliari next season, on a three-year contract.

He was released by Cagliari on 1 July 2010 and signed a six months contract with Serie B side Novara on 3 January 2011, the first working day of Lega Serie B.
