= Francesco Bardi =

Italian footballer (born 1992)

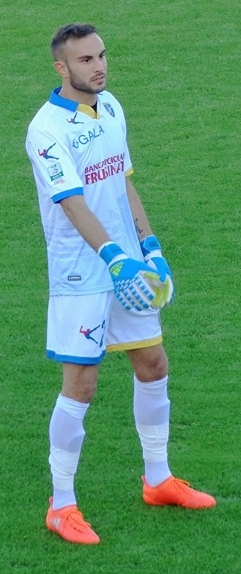
- Bardi with Frosinone in 2016

Personal information
- Date of birth: 18 January 1992 (age 34)
- Place of birth: Livorno, Italy
- Height: 1.88 m (6 ft 2 in)
- Position: Goalkeeper

Team information
- Current team: Mantova (on loan from Palermo)
- Number: 24

Youth career
- 1999–2003: Sorgenti Labrone
- 2003–2010: Livorno

Senior career*
Years	Team	Apps	(Gls)
2010–2011	Livorno	1	(0)
2011–2018	Inter Milan	0	(0)
2011–2012	→ Livorno (loan)	34	(0)
2012–2013	→ Novara (loan)	37	(0)
2013–2014	→ Livorno (loan)	35	(0)
2014–2015	→ Chievo (loan)	10	(0)
2015	→ Espanyol (loan)	0	(0)
2015–2018	→ Frosinone (loan)	68	(0)
2018–2021	Frosinone	78	(0)
2021–2023	Bologna	3	(0)
2023–2025	Reggiana	66	(0)
2025–	Palermo	1	(0)
2026–	→ Mantova (loan)	20	(0)

International career^{‡}
2009	Italy U17	6	(0)
2009	Italy U18	2	(0)
2010–2011	Italy U19	10	(0)
2011–2015	Italy U21	37	(0)
- * Club domestic league appearances and goals as of 13 May 2026 ‡ National team caps and goals as of 24 June 2015

Francesco Bardi (born 18 January 1992) is an Italian professional footballer who plays as a goalkeeper for Serie B club Mantova on loan from Palermo.

== Club career ==
=== Livorno ===
Bardi is a product of Livorno's youth system. He made his professional and Serie A debut on 16 May 2010, aged 18, starting the home game versus Parma, with the latter coming off 1–4 winners, when Livorno had already been relegated.

=== Inter Milan ===
In January 2011 he was signed by Inter Milan, on loan with an option to purchase half of the registration rights and he played for Inter's U-19 youth team until the end of the 2010–11 season. He replaced injured Raffaele Di Gennaro as first choice, winning 2011 Torneo di Viareggio.

Inter excised the rights for €1.35 million in a 4-year contract (with part of transfer credit turned to the purchase of Simone Dell'Agnello for €500,000 and Luca Siligardi for €150,000) but on 3 August 2011 returned Bardi on loan to Livorno for the 2011–12 season, in order to gain first team experience. On 27 August 2011 he made his Serie B debut playing as the first choice goalkeeper in the away match won 2–1 against Crotone. In the whole season, Bardi was ahead of the original starter Alfonso De Lucia.

In June 2012, Inter bought Bardi outright for another €4 million (€1.5 million cash plus Dell'Agnello and Siligardi to Livorno for €1.25 million each) and on 14 July 2012, let him join Serie B team Novara Calcio on a loan deal. At Novara, he was the first-choice goalkeeper for the duration of the season and generated significant hype around himself with his good performances, making 35 appearances.

After the expiration of the loan, Internazionale again loaned him out, this time back to newly promoted Serie A side Livorno Calcio.

==== Loan to ChievoVerona ====
On 27 June 2014, Bardi was loaned out to Serie A side A.C. Chievo Verona for the 2014–15 season. On 22 August he made his debut for Chievo Verona in the third round of Coppa Italia in a 1–0 away defeat against Pescara. On 30 August, Bardi made his Serie A debut in a 1–0 home defeat against Juventus. On 14 September he save a penalty from Gonzalo Higuain in a 1–0 away win over Napoli. On 26 October he save another penalty in a 2–1 home defeat against Genoa. Bardi play the first 9 Serie A match, but he became the second goalkeeper after the arrive of Albano Bizzarri. On 17 May he made the last appearances in a 2–0 away defeat against Torino. Bardi ended his loan to Chievo Verona with 11 appearances, kept 1 clean sheet and conceding 18 goals.

==== Loan to Espanyol ====
On 26 July 2015, he was signed by Espanyol with a season-long loan with option to buy, for replacing Kiko Casilla. On 3 December he made his debut for Espanyol in the round of 32 of the Copa del Rey in a 1–1 away draw against Levante. On 13 January, Bardi played in the round of 16 of the Copa del Rey in a 2–0 home defeat against Barcelona. At the end of January, Bardi was recall to Inter and he finish his loan to Espanyol with only 2 appearances.

==== Loan to Frosinone ====
On 28 January 2016, Bardi was signed with a 6-month loan from Serie A club Frosinone. He is the second goalkeeper after Nicola Leali. On 1 May, Bardi made his debut for Frosinone in a 3–3 away draw against Milan, in this match he save a penalty from Mario Balotelli. One week later he play in the last match of Serie A in 1–0 home defeat against Sassuolo.

He followed the club, relegated to Serie B, which loaned him to Frosinone for another season, with an option to sign him outright. On 13 August he made played his first game of the season in the third round of Coppa Italia in a 2–0 away defeat against Pescara. On 27 August, Bardi played his first Serie B match for Frosinone in a 2–0 home win over Virtus Entella.

The loan was renewed again on 13 July 2017.

=== Bologna and later years ===
On 17 July 2021, he signed with Serie A club Bologna.

After two seasons as a reserve keeper and only three league appearances with Bologna, in 2023 Bardi signed for Serie B club Reggiana. In 2025, after being released from his contract, he signed for fellow Serie B club Palermo. On 2 January 2026, Bardi was loaned by Mantova, with a conditional obligation to buy.

== International career ==
With the Italy U17 team, he took part, as the backup goalkeeper, at both the 2009 European U17 Championship and the 2009 U17 World Cup.

On 24 March 2011, he made his debut with the Italy U21 squad in a friendly game against Sweden.

Bardi finished as the runner-up of 2013 UEFA European Under-21 Championship. The coach also stated that the exclusion of Mattia Perin from the U21 squad was to avoid competition between the first choice and backup keeper.

Bardi took part, as a starter, also at the 2015 UEFA European Under-21 Championship.

== Career statistics ==
=== Club ===
As of match played 9 May 2025

Appearances and goals by club, season and competition
Club	Season	League			Cup		Continental		Other		Total	
Club	Season	Division	Apps	Goals	Apps	Goals	Apps	Goals	Apps	Goals	Apps	Goals
Livorno	2009–10	Serie A	1	0	0	0	—		—		1	0
Livorno	2010–11	Serie B	0	0	0	0	—		—		0	0
Livorno	Total		1	0	0	0	—		—		1	0
Livorno (loan)	2011–12	Serie B	34	0	1	0	—		—		35	0
Novara (loan)	2012–13	Serie B	37	0	1	0	—		2 (Note: Appearance in Serie B Promotion)	0	40	0
Livorno (loan)	2013–14	Serie A	35	0	0	0	—		—		35	0
Chievo (loan)	2014–15	Serie A	10	0	1	0	—		—		11	0
Espanyol (loan)	2015–16	La Liga	0	0	2	0	—		—		2	0
Frosinone	2015–16	Serie A	2	0	0	0	—		—		2	0
Frosinone	2016–17	Serie B	41	0	1	0	—		—		42	0
Frosinone	2017–18	Serie B	25	0	0	0	—		—		25	0
Frosinone	2018–19	Serie A	3	0	0	0	—		—		3	0
Frosinone	2019–20	Serie B	41	0	2	0	—		—		43	0
Frosinone	2020–21	Serie B	34	0	0	0	—		—		34	0
Frosinone	Total		146	0	3	0	—		—		149	0
Bologna	2021–22	Serie A	2	0	0	0	—		—		2	0
Bologna	2022–23	Serie A	1	0	1	0	—		—		2	0
Bologna	Total		3	0	1	0	—		—		4	0
Reggiana	2023–24	Serie B	30	0	2	0	—		—		32	0
Reggiana	2024–25	Serie B	36	0	0	0	—		—		36	0
Reggiana	Total		66	0	2	0	—		—		68	0
Career Total			342	0	11	0	0	0	2	0	355	0
