= Martín Suárez (footballer) =

Uruguayan football player (born 2004)

Personal information
- Full name: Martín Eduardo Suárez Debattista
- Date of birth: 16 June 2004 (age 22)
- Place of birth: Montevideo, Uruguay
- Height: 1.78 m (5 ft 10 in)
- Position: Midfielder

Team information
- Current team: Renate (on loan from Reggiana)
- Number: 15

Youth career
- Unión Vecinal
- Montevideo Wanderers

Senior career*
Years	Team	Apps	(Gls)
2021–2025	Montevideo Wanderers	71	(2)
2026–	Reggiana	1	(0)
2026–	→ Renate (loan)	0	(0)

International career
2018–2019	Uruguay U15	23	(0)
2021–2022	Uruguay U20	3	(0)
- * Club domestic league appearances and goals as of 24 August 2026

Martín Eduardo Suárez Debattista (born 16 June 2004) is a Uruguayan professional footballer who plays as a midfielder for Serie C Group A club Renate on loan from Reggiana.

== Club career ==
A youth academy graduate of Montevideo Wanderers, Suárez made his professional debut on 12 March 2021 in a 3–0 league defeat against Plaza Colonia.

On 8 January 2026, Suárez signed a two-and-a-half-year contract with Serie B side Reggiana.

== International career ==
Suárez was a Uruguayan youth international. He was included in the national team for the 2019 South American U-15 Championship.

== Career statistics ==
As of 13 February 2023

Appearances and goals by club, season and competition
Club	Season	League			Cup		Continental		Total	
Club	Season	Division	Apps	Goals	Apps	Goals	Apps	Goals	Apps	Goals
Montevideo Wanderers	2020	Uruguayan Primera División	3	0	—		—		3	0
Montevideo Wanderers	2021	Uruguayan Primera División	0	0	—		0	0	0	0
Montevideo Wanderers	2022	Uruguayan Primera División	6	0	0	0	1 (Note: Appearance in Copa Sudamericana.)	0	7	0
Montevideo Wanderers	2023	Uruguayan Primera División	2	0	0	0	—		2	0
Career total			11	0	0	0	1	0	12	0
