= Massimo Berta =

Italian footballer (1949–2020)

Personal information
- Date of birth: 4 March 1949
- Place of birth: Genoa, Italy
- Date of death: 18 May 2020 (aged 71)
- Place of death: Genoa, Italy
- Position: Midfielder

Senior career*
| Years | Team | Apps | (Gls) |
| 1966–1971 | Alessandria | 118 | (4) |
| 1971–1972 | Foggia | 24 | (0) |
| 1972–1973 | Alessandria | 38 | (2) |
| 1973–1974 | Lecco | 34 | (0) |
| 1974–1977 | Sambenedettese | 86 | (2) |
| 1977–1979 | Reggiana | 56 | (1) |
| 1979–1980 | Imperia | 31 | (1) |
| Total | | 387 | (10) |
- * Club domestic league appearances and goals

Massimo Berta (4 March 1949 – 18 May 2020) was an Italian professional footballer who played as a midfielder.

== Career ==
Born in Genoa, Berta played for Alessandria, Foggia, Lecco, Sambenedettese, Reggiana and Imperia.
