= Cedric Gondo =

Ivorian footballer (born 1996)

- Gondo with Salernitana in 2020

Personal information
- Full name: Diomandè Yann Cedric Gondo
- Date of birth: 25 November 1996 (age 29)
- Place of birth: Divo, Ivory Coast
- Height: 1.87 m (6 ft 2 in)
- Position: Forward

Youth career
- –2010: Albignasego
- 2010–2015: Fiorentina

Senior career*
Years	Team	Apps	(Gls)
2015–2016	Fiorentina	0	(0)
2015–2016	→ Ternana (loan)	25	(2)
2016–2018	Asteras Tripolis	15	(2)
2018	Pescara	0	(0)
2018	→ Teramo (loan)	14	(0)
2018–2019	Rieti	31	(9)
2019–2021	Lazio	0	(0)
2019–2021	→ Salernitana (loan)	53	(11)
2021–2022	Salernitana	14	(1)
2022–2024	Cremonese	15	(1)
2022–2023	→ Ascoli (loan)	34	(7)
2023–2024	→ Reggiana (loan)	31	(6)
2024–2026	Reggiana	59	(9)
- * Club domestic league appearances and goals as of 13 May 2026

Diomandè Yann Cedric Gondo (born 25 November 1996) is an Ivorian professional footballer who plays as a forward.

== Early life ==
Gondo was born in Divo, in the south of the Ivory Coast; at age seven he moved to Italy with his family, settling in Casier, in the province of Treviso.

== Career ==
Gondo began his youth career with Fiorentina. On 24 August 2015, he was sent on loan with the right of purchase to Serie B side Ternana. He made his professional debut on 6 September against Trapani, replacing Fabio Ceravolo in the 74th minute. Gondo scored his first goal with Ternana on 12 December against Como. He ended the season scoring two goals in 25 appearances.

On 9 August 2016, Gondo was signed by Asteras Tripolis, with whom he signed a four-year contract. He made his debut in the Super League Greece on 25 September against Atromitos, coming on as a substitute in the 34th minute of the second half in place of Pablo Mazza.

On 2 September 2019, after some experiences in Serie C, he was signed by Lazio, who sent him on loan to Salernitana. Starting as a reserve, he gradually carved out a place as a starter under Gian Piero Ventura, scoring six goals – including the goal that allowed his side to win 2–1 in the derby against Juve Stabia – and making nine assists.

On 30 January 2022, Gondo signed with Cremonese. On 10 August 2022, he moved on loan to Ascoli, with an option to buy. On 30 August 2023, Gondo moved on a new loan to Reggiana, with an obligation to buy if Reggiana avoided relegation from Serie B. Reggiana avoided it.

== Style of play ==
Gondo is a versatile centre-forward, whose main characteristics are his physicality, agility, and aerial play.

== Personal life ==
Gondo is known for having participated in both seasons of MTV's reality TV show Calciatori – Giovani speranze, when he was a Fiorentina youth player.

== Career statistics ==
As of match played 5 May 2024

Appearances and goals by club, season and competition
Club	Season	League			National cup (Note: Includes Greek Football Cup, Coppa Italia, Coppa Italia Serie C)		Total	
Club	Season	Division	Apps	Goals	Apps	Goals	Apps	Goals
Ternana (loan)	2015–16	Serie B	25	2	0	0	25	2
Asteras Tripolis	2016–17	Super League Greece	7	1	0	0	7	1
Asteras Tripolis	2017–18	Super League Greece	8	1	1	0	9	1
Asteras Tripolis	Total		15	2	1	0	16	2
Teramo (loan)	2017–18	Serie C	14	0	0	0	14	0
Rieti	2018–19	Serie C	30	8	0	0	30	8
Rieti	2019–20	Serie C	1	1	1	0	2	1
Rieti	Total		31	9	1	0	32	9
Salernitana	2019–20	Serie B	26	6	0	0	26	6
Salernitana	2020–21	Serie B	27	5	1	0	28	5
Salernitana	2021–22	Serie A	14	1	1	0	15	1
Salernitana	Total		67	12	2	0	69	12
Cremonese	2021–22	Serie B	15	1	0	0	15	0
Ascoli (loan)	2022–23	Serie B	34	7	1	0	35	7
Reggiana (loan)	2023–24	Serie B	31	6	1	0	32	6
Reggiana	2024–25	Serie B	0	0	0	0	0	0
Career total			232	39	6	0	238	39
