= Tobías Reinhart =

Argentine footballer

Personal information
- Full name: Tobías Elián Reinhart
- Date of birth: 21 May 2000 (age 26)
- Place of birth: Lomas de Zamora, Argentina
- Height: 1.76 m (5 ft 9 in)
- Position: Forward

Team information
- Current team: Universidad de Chile

Youth career
- 2009–2018: Temperley

Senior career*
| Years | Team | Apps | (Gls) |
| 2018–2023 | Temperley | 86 | (7) |
| 2019–2020 | → Spezia (loan) | 2 | (0) |
| 2024–2026 | Reggiana | 67 | (4) |
| 2026– | Universidad de Chile | 0 | (0) |
- * Club domestic league appearances and goals as of 13 May 2026

Tobías Elián Reinhart (born 21 May 2000) is an Argentine professional footballer who plays forward for Chilean club Universidad de Chile.

== Career ==
After joining Temperley's academy in 2009, made the breakthrough into senior football there. He featured twice in the 2018–19 season, coming off the bench in a Copa Argentina tie versus Estudiantes and in Primera B Nacional against Gimnasia y Esgrima.

His first start arrived the following December during a goalless draw away to Defensores de Belgrano. In August 2019, Reinhart was signed by Italian Serie B outfit Spezia on loan. He was assigned to their youth team in Campionato Primavera 2. In November 2019, he began to be regularly called to the senior squad. On 26 December 2019, he made his Serie B debut when he played a full game against Virtus Entella. On 19 February he scored his first goal as a professional in the CA Temperley shirt against Club Atlético Talleres de Remedios de Escalada, scoring the third goal of the match.

In December 2023, Reinhart returned to Italy and signed a contract with Reggiana, effective on 2 January 2024.

On 4 August 2026, Reinhart signed with Chilean club Universidad de Chile on a deal until December 2028.

== Career statistics ==
As of 21 August 2020.

Appearances and goals by club, season and competition
| Club | Season | League | | | Cup | | League Cup | | Continental | | Other | | Total | |
| Club | Season | Division | Apps | Goals | Apps | Goals | Apps | Goals | Apps | Goals | Apps | Goals | Apps | Goals |
|---|---|---|---|---|---|---|---|---|---|---|---|---|---|---|
| Temperley | 2018–19 | Primera B Nacional | 18 | 0 | 3 | 0 | — | | — | | 0 | 0 | 21 | 0 |
| Temperley | 2019–20 | Primera B Nacional | 0 | 0 | 0 | 0 | — | | — | | 0 | 0 | 0 | 0 |
| Temperley | Total | | 18 | 0 | 3 | 0 | — | | — | | 0 | 0 | 21 | 0 |
| Spezia (loan) | 2019–20 | Serie B | 2 | 0 | 0 | 0 | — | | — | | 0 | 0 | 2 | 0 |
| Career total | | | 20 | 0 | 3 | 0 | — | | — | | 0 | 0 | 23 | 0 |
