= Mateus Lusuardi =

Brazilian footballer (born 2004)

Personal information
- Full name: Mateus Henrique Vanzelli Lusuardi
- Date of birth: 8 January 2004 (age 22)
- Place of birth: São José do Rio Preto, Brazil
- Height: 1.90 m (6 ft 3 in)
- Position: Centre-back

Team information
- Current team: Pisa

Youth career
- Gremio
- Grêmio Novorizontino
- 2022–2023: Criciúma

Senior career*
Years	Team	Apps	(Gls)
2023–2025	Frosinone	16	(2)
2025–	Pisa	3	(0)
2026	→ Reggiana (loan)	11	(1)
- * Club domestic league appearances and goals as of 13 May 2026

Mateus Henrique Vanzelli Lusuardi (born 8 January 2004) is a Brazilian professional footballer who plays as a defender for Serie B club Pisa.

== Early life ==
Lusuardi grew up in the Gremio youth ranks in Porto Alegre, before moving to Grêmio Novorizontino and then to Criciuma EC in 2022.

== Career ==
Mateus Lusuardi joined the Frosinone Calcio academy in August 2023, from Criciúma, a path reminding the one of Brazilian-born Italy international Éder.

In Italy first started playing with the Primavera team, but soon became a regular on the bench for Eusebio Di Francesco's Serie A team.

Lusuardi made his professional debut for Frosinone on the 19 December 2023, starting and playing every minute of a 0–4 away Coppa Italia win against Napoli. This was a notable victory against Kvaratskhelia and Osimhen's Serie A title holders, in which the young defender was among the standouts.

He made his Italian top flight debut with the club four days later, again as a starter, against Juventus.

On 27 June 2025, Lusuardi signed a four-year contract with Pisa, with an option for a fifth year.

On 2 February 2026, Lusuardi moved on loan to Reggiana in Serie B.
