= Marco Napolioni =

Italian footballer

Marco Napolioni (born 16 June 1975 in Rome) is an Italian former footballer who played a midfielder. After playing in S.S. Lazio youth teams (where he won the Campionato Nazionale Primavera in 1994–1995) he is sold to Lodigiani where he made his professional debut. He played his whole career in Serie C1 and Serie C2, with the exception of a year in Serie B with Salernitana.

== Career ==
1995-1996 Lodigiani 33 (3)
1996-1997 Pistoiese 30 (1)
1997-1998 Salernitana 8 (0)
1998-1999 Foggia 16 (0)
1999-2002 Catania 71 (1)
2002-2004 Sambenedettese 55 (6)
2004-2005 Reggiana 31 (2)
2005-2007 Lucchese 57 (1)
2007-2008 Nuorese 29 (1)
2008-2009 Cuoiopelli 24 (1)
2009-2010 Latina ? (?)

== See also ==
- Football in Italy
- List of football clubs in Italy
