= Francesco Marroccu =

Italian sporting director

Francesco Marroccu, born in Cagliari, is an Italian Sporting Director of AC Reggiana 1919 who works as Sporting Director at Serie C side Reggio Emilia, after previously holding the role of Sporting Director at then Serie A side Cagliari Calcio and working with their youth teams.

== Career ==
Marroccu started his career at Sardinia based Italian side Nuorese Calcio as Sporting Director, before on 1 July 2015 being appointed by Massimo Cellino at Cagliari Calcio as Secretary General, then being promoted to Executive General in 2009, before becoming the club's Sporting Director in 2014.

On 12 September 2015, Marroccu ended his stay at Cagliari and joined Serie B Side Ascoli as Sporting Director.
