= Alessandro Spanò =

Italian footballer (born 1994)

Personal information
- Full name: Alessandro Spanò
- Date of birth: 19 June 1994 (age 32)
- Place of birth: Città di San Marino, San Marino
- Height: 1.76 m (5 ft 9 in)
- Position: Defender

Youth career
- 2012–2013: Pro Vercelli

Senior career*
| Years | Team | Apps | (Gls) |
| 2013–2014 | Pro Patria | 25 | (1) |
| 2014–2020 | Reggiana | 187 | (15) |
| Total | | 212 | (16) |
- * Club domestic league appearances and goals

Alessandro Spanò (born 19 June 1994) is a former professional footballer who played as a defender. He spent most of his career with Reggiana, helping them gain promotion to the Serie B in 2020 as their captain.

== Club career ==
Spanò made his professional debut with Pro Patria in a 1–0 Serie C defeat to Pro Vercelli on 8 September 2013.

He moved to Reggiana and played with them in the Serie D and Serie C, eventually becoming their captain. On 22 July 2020, Spanò led Reggiana as they beat Bari 1–0 and earned promotion to the Serie B for the first time in 21 years. One week later, Spanò announced he was retiring from football to further his education after graduating with a degree in economics, and earning an international scholarship.
