= Manolo Portanova =

Italian footballer (born 2000)

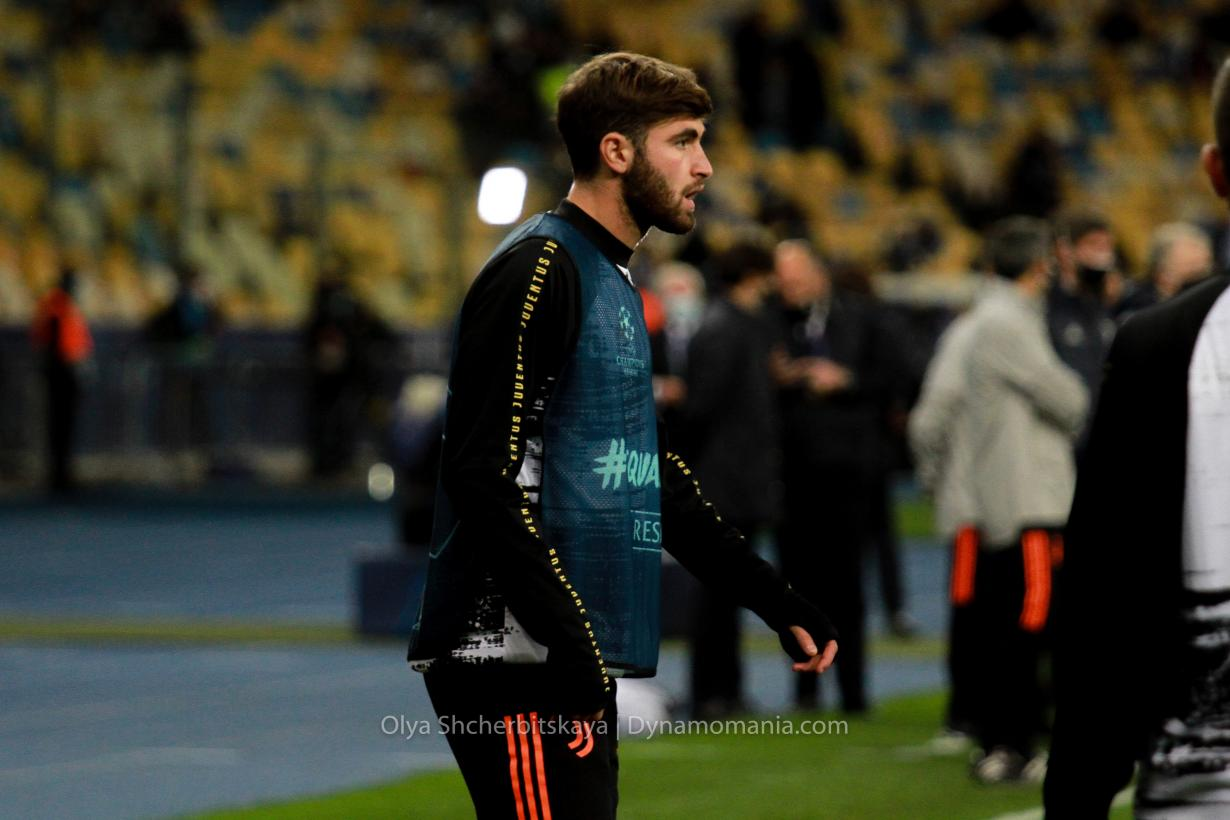
- Portanova warming up for Juventus in 2020

Personal information
- Date of birth: 2 June 2000 (age 26)
- Place of birth: Naples, Italy
- Height: 1.83 m (6 ft 0 in)
- Position: Attacking midfielder

Team information
- Current team: Reggiana
- Number: 90

Youth career
- 2014: Athletic Club Liberi
- 2015–2017: Lazio
- 2017–2020: Juventus

Senior career*
Years	Team	Apps	(Gls)
2018–2020	Juventus U23	24	(0)
2019–2021	Juventus	3	(0)
2021–2025	Genoa	39	(2)
2023–2025	→ Reggiana (loan)	72	(13)
2025–	Reggiana	36	(7)

International career^{‡}
2017	Italy U17	8	(0)
2017–2018	Italy U18	13	(2)
2018–2019	Italy U19	17	(5)
2020–2022	Italy U21	3	(0)
- * Club domestic league appearances and goals as of 13 May 2026 ‡ National team caps and goals as of 29 March 2022

Manolo Portanova (born 2 June 2000) is an Italian professional footballer who plays as an attacking midfielder for Serie C Group B club Reggiana.

== Club career ==
Portanova is a youth product of Lazio, having joined in summer 2015, and started playing for their under-19 squad in the 2016–17 season.

In July 2017, Portanova moved to Juventus. He made his Serie C debut for Juventus U23 on 30 March 2019, in a game against Pistoiese, as a 76th-minute substitute for Luca Zanimacchia. His senior and Serie A debut for Juventus came on 26 May 2019, in the club's final match of the season, coming on as a second-half substitute for Emre Can in a 2–0 away loss to Sampdoria. During the match, he set up a goal for Moise Kean, but it was disallowed for offside.

On 29 January 2021, Portanova moved to Genoa for a fee of €10 million, plus a maximum of €5 million in performance-related bonuses.

On 3 August 2023, Portanova joined Reggiana in Serie B on a season-long loan. Three days later, he scored twice on his debut for Reggiana in a Coppa Italia game against Pescara.

On 8 August 2024, Portanova re-joined Reggiana on loan, with an obligation to buy in July 2025.

== International career ==
Portanova was first called up to represent his country in 2017 with the under-17 squad. He participated in the 2017 UEFA European Under-17 Championship; they did not advance from the group stage. With the Italy U19 squad Portanova took part at the 2019 UEFA European Under-19 Championship.

On 13 October 2020, Portanova made his debut with the Italy U21 side, appearing as a substitute in a 2021 UEFA European Under-21 Championship qualification match against the Republic of Ireland in Pisa, which Italy won 2–0.

== Personal life ==
Portanova's father Daniele played in the Serie A for Siena, Bologna, and Genoa.

=== Gang rape charges and trial ===
On 10 June 2021, Portanova was placed under house arrest following an injunction related to a case of rape in the city of Siena. On 6 December 2022, Portanova was charged with gang rape along with his uncle, Alessio Langella. Both were sentenced to six years in prison, and in addition Portanova was fined with having to pay €100,000 to the victim, €20,000 to the mother of the victim, and €10,000 to a Siena-based women's shelter who took part in the investigation.

== Career statistics ==
=== Club ===
As of match played 29 September 2023

Appearances and goals by club, season and competition
Club	Season	League			National Cup (Note: Includes Coppa Italia)		Continental		Other		Total	
Club	Season	Division	Apps	Goals	Apps	Goals	Apps	Goals	Apps	Goals	Apps	Goals
Juventus U23	2018–19	Serie C	3	0	—		—		—		3	0
Juventus U23	2019–20	Serie C	21	0	—		—		6 (Note: Two appearances in the Serie C promotion play-offs, four appearances in the Coppa Italia Serie C)	0	27	0
Juventus U23	Total		24	0	0	0	0	0	6	0	30	0
Juventus	2018–19	Serie A	1	0	—		—		—		1	0
Juventus	2019–20	Serie A	0	0	—		0	0	—		0	0
Juventus	2020–21	Serie A	2	0	1	0	0	0	—		3	0
Juventus	Total		3	0	1	0	0	0	0	0	4	0
Genoa	2020–21	Serie A	3	0	—		—		—		3	0
Genoa	2021–22	Serie A	24	1	2	0	—		—		26	1
Genoa	2022–23	Serie B	12	1	2	0	—		—		14	1
Genoa	Total		39	2	4	0	0	0	0	0	43	2
Reggiana	2023–24	Serie B	7	0	2	2	—		—		9	2
Career total			73	2	7	2	0	0	6	0	86	4

== Honours ==
=== Club ===
Juventus U23

- Coppa Italia Serie C: 2019–20

Juventus

- Serie A: 2018–19
- Coppa Italia: 2020–21
