= Paolo Rozzio =

Italian footballer

Personal information
- Date of birth: 22 July 1992 (age 34)
- Place of birth: Savigliano, Italy
- Height: 1.90 m (6 ft 3 in)
- Position: Centre-back

Team information
- Current team: Reggiana
- Number: 4

Youth career
- 2002–2006: Juventus
- 2006–2008: CBS Scuola Calcio
- 2008–2010: Canavese
- 2010: → Torino (loan)

Senior career*
Years	Team	Apps	(Gls)
2010–2011	Canavese	20	(1)
2011–2014	Fiorentina	0	(0)
2012–2014	→ Pisa (loan)	37	(2)
2014–2016	Pisa	41	(2)
2016–	Reggiana	203	(11)

International career
2011	Italy U19	7	(0)
2011	Italy U20	1	(0)
- * Club domestic league appearances and goals as of 13 May 2026

Paolo Rozzio (born 22 July 1992) is an Italian footballer who plays for Serie C Group B club Reggiana. He plays as center back and, since 2020 he is the Granata's Club captain.

== Biography ==
=== Youth career ===
Born in Savigliano, the Province of Cuneo, Piedmont, Rozzio started his career at Juventus. Rozzio played for the Turin club (Italian: Torino) until 2005–06 season. Before he left the club, he was the member of Giovanissimi Regionali U14 team. He started for Juve in Pulcini A team in 2002–03 season.

In 2006 Rozzio left for CBS Scuola Calcio (name after Cavoretto, Borgo Po and San Salvario, 3 locality of Turin), a Turin-based club which signed a partnership agreement with A.C. Milan. He was selected to Piedmont Giovanissimi representative team for 2007 Coppa Nazionale Primavera. Rozzio played for its Allievi Regionali U17 team in 2007–08 season, despite he was eligible to Allievi Regionali Fascia B U16.

Rozzio left for Canavese in 2008. Rozzio was the member of Allievi U17 team and the reserve in 2008–09 Campionato Nazionale Allievi and 2009–10 Campionato Berretti respectively. In January 2010 Rozzio was signed by Torino F.C. in 6-month loan, he was the member of the reserve in Campionato Primavera. He only played twice for Torino reserve.

=== Canavese ===
In 2010 Rozzio returned to San Giusto of Canavese area at age 18. He made his professional debut with FC Canavese on 15 August 2010, a 2010–11 Coppa Italia Lega Pro match. He also played the next cup matches but rested for the rest. The club finished as the fourth (last) of Group A. He also received international youth caps during 2010–11 season, rejoining fellow Torino youth product Simone Benedetti (centre-back). He played all 3 matches in 2011 UEFA European Under-19 Football Championship elite qualification.

=== Fiorentina ===
In April 2011 the club agreed to sell Rozzio to Serie A club ACF Fiorentina, rejoining another youth international team-mate Michele Camporese (centre-back) and Cristiano Piccini. The deal effective on 1 July 2011, with €250,000 transfer fee. He signed a 5-year contract. Canavese folded at the start of 2011–12 season. Despite received no.39 shirt of the first team, Rozzio played all 26 matches of the reserve, as well as 2 matches in the first and second round of the playoffs round of 2011–12 Campionato Primavera.

=== Pisa ===
On 29 June 2012 he went a loan to Pisa. On 13 July 2013 was renewed the loan to Pisa. On 21 July 2014 he buy definitely by Pisa.

=== Reggiana ===
On 9 August 2016 Rozzio was signed by Reggiana .

== Honours ==
- Supercoppa Primavera: 2011 (Fiorentina U20)
