= Lorenzo Libutti =

Italian footballer

Personal information
- Date of birth: 17 September 1997 (age 29)
- Place of birth: Melfi, Italy
- Height: 1.80 m (5 ft 11 in)
- Position: Defender

Team information
- Current team: Reggiana
- Number: 17

Youth career
- –2014: Melfi

Senior career*
Years	Team	Apps	(Gls)
2014–2017	Melfi	24	(0)
2015–2016	→ Grosseto (loan)	34	(0)
2017–2019	Triestina	48	(2)
2019–	Reggiana	175	(2)
- * Club domestic league appearances and goals as of 13 May 2026

Lorenzo Libutti (born 17 September 1997) is an Italian football player. He plays for Serie C Group B club Reggiana.

== Club career ==
He played for the first 6 seasons of his senior career in the lower-tier Serie C and Serie D.

He made his Serie B debut for Reggiana on 20 October 2020 in a game against Ascoli, as a starter.
