= Natan Girma =

Swiss footballer (born 2001)

Personal information
- Date of birth: 11 December 2001 (age 24)
- Height: 1.90 m (6 ft 3 in)
- Position: Midfielder

Team information
- Current team: Reggiana
- Number: 80

Youth career
- –2021: Servette

Senior career*
| Years | Team | Apps | (Gls) |
| 2021–2023 | Sona | 24 | (2) |
| 2023– | Reggiana | 75 | (13) |
- * Club domestic league appearances and goals as of 13 May 2026

Natan Girma (born 11 December 2001) is a Swiss professional footballer who plays as a midfielder for Serie C Group B club Reggiana.

== Early life ==
As a youth player, Girma joined the youth academy of Swiss side Servette. He captained the club's under-21 team. After that, he almost signed for German side Hannover 96. In 2021, he signed for Italian side Sona. He made twenty-four league appearances and scored two goals while playing for the club. In 2023, he signed for Italian side Reggiana.

Girma was born on 11 December 2001. He is a native of Vaud, Switzerland. He has regarded Brazil international Ronaldinho as his football idol. He started playing football at the age of four. Girma was born to a footballer father. He obtained Eritrean citizenship.

== Style of play ==
Girma mainly operates as a midfielder. He specifically operates as an attacking midfielder. He can also operate as a central midfielder or as a winger. He is right-footed. He is known for his speed. He has been described as "has a lot of agility and light-footedness, coupled with... qualities in one-on-one situations... attacks deep without hesitation and is always looking to move forward".
