= AC Reggiana 1919 =

Association football club in Italy

Reggiana
- Full name: Associazione Calcio Reggiana 1919 S.r.l.
- Nicknames: I Granata (The Maroons); Regia (local dialect for Reggiana); Teste Quadre (Square Heads) from an ancient Poems
- Founded: 25 September 1919; 107 years ago 1 August 2005; 21 years ago as A.C. Reggiana 1919; 2018; 8 years ago as Reggio Audace F.C.
- Stadium: Mapei Stadium – Città del Tricolore
- Capacity: 21,584
- Owner(s): Romano Amadei (74,79% of club shares); Carmelo Salerno (20%); Giuseppe Fico (5,21%)
- President: Carmelo Salerno
- Head coach: Attilio Tesser
- League: Serie C Group B
- 2025–26: Serie B, 18th of 20 (relegated)
- Website: reggianacalcio.it
| Home colours | Away colours | Third colours |

Associazione Calcio Reggiana 1919, commonly referred to as Reggiana, is a professional football club based in Reggio Emilia, Emilia-Romagna, Italy. The club was formed in 1919, reformed in 2005 (Serie C2) and 2018 (Serie D) after going bankrupt twice, and currently plays in the Serie C, the third tier of Italian football. Reggiana is known as i Granata (lit. 'the Maroons') in reference to the club's main colour: maroon.

The club was reformed twice after going bankrupt: in 2005 as Reggio Emilia Football Club, and in 2018 as Reggio Audace Football Club. On both occasions, the club regained the naming rights and the trophies of A.C. Reggiana via judicial auction. The club has participated in Serie A, the top tier of Italian football, seven times; their last appearance dates back to the 1996–97 season.

== History ==
=== Formation ===
The first football game in Reggio Emilia was played under the roof of the old market in 1909, via an exhibition promoted by the local multi-sports association “Forti per Essere Liberi” (Strong to be Free). The first football clubs emerged subsequently in the coming years, with Reggio Football Club, formed in 1912, rising to prominence as the main local side due to its participation to Promozione, the then Italian second tier, divided into regional groups. In 1914, a group of Reggio F.C. members in disagreement with the presidency at the time decided to leave the club and form Juventus F.C. The two sides clashed in 1914–15 Promozione. The entry of Italy into World War 1 in May 1915 caused a vacuum in the local football scene, as many young players were drafted into the army and lost their lives in the war. On 25 September 1919, in the main town square (today's Piazza Prampolini), a group of former footballers, assembled by former Reggio F.C. footballer Severino Taddei, decided to form a new local club, using Juventus’ ground Campo Mirabello and Reggio F.C. colours (maroon and blue). The new club was formed as Associazione Calcio Reggiana.

=== A.C. Reggiana (1919–2005) ===
The club was originally founded in 1919 under the name A.C. Reggiana, and played in the Italian First Division for several seasons in the 1920s. More recently, it played in Serie A in 1993–94, 1994–95, and 1996–97. Their highest ranking was 13th place in the 1993–94 Serie A championship, where its main name was Brazilian goalkeeper Cláudio Taffarel, who would go on to win the 1994 FIFA World Cup after the season.

=== A.C. Reggiana 1919 (2005–2018) ===
In July 2005, the sports title of A.C. Reggiana S.p.A. was transferred to a new investor, Reggio Emilia F.C. S.p.A., before being renamed as A.C. Reggiana 1919 S.p.A. soon after the start of the 2005–06 season.

In the 2007–08 Serie C2 regular season, the team finished first in Group B, and won direct promotion to Lega Pro Prima Divisione (formerly known as Serie C1 until that year) for the 2008–2009 season. Reggiana also won 2008 Supercoppa di Serie C2, a competition for three group stage winners of Serie C2.

The club was acquired by Italian-American former baseball player Mike Piazza in 2016. After the 2017–18 season, the Piazza family decided not to register the team in the 2018–19 Serie C season, leading the club to the loss of its sporting title and subsequent exclusion from the Italian professional leagues.

=== Reggio Audace F.C. (2018–2020) ===
On 31 July 2018, a new entity was formed in Reggio Emilia, called Reggio Audace F.C.. The name was given in honour of a precursor entity of the 1910s, where Reggiana founder Severino Taddei used to play before founding the granata club. The new club, whose ownership was the expression of local entrepreneurs from Reggio Emilia, subsequently announced former Ravenna manager Mauro Antonioli as the new gaffer of the newborn club, admitted into the 2018–19 Serie D. Two days later a three-year partnership was signed with Macron. On 20 August 2018 striker Nicola Luche became the first ever signing of the club.

The club gained promotion to the Serie B, after having been admitted by repechage to the Serie C due to vacancies left by bankrupt clubs in the third tier of Italian football and winning the 2019–20 Serie C playoff, returning to Serie B after an absence of 21 years, gaining subsequently two consecutive promotions.

=== A.C. Reggiana 1919 (2020–present) ===
On 28 July 2020, the club changed its name back to A.C. Reggiana 1919.

== Recent seasons ==
| Season | Division | Tier | Pos | Pl | W | D | L | + | - | P | Cup | Note |
|---|---|---|---|---|---|---|---|---|---|---|---|---|
| 2016–17 | Lega Pro (Group B) | III | 5 | 38 | 16 | 11 | 11 | 43 | 36 | 59 | 2nd round | Eliminated in the Promotion play-offs semifinals to Alessandria |
| 2017–18 | Serie C (Group B) | III | ↓ 4 | 34 | 14 | 11 | 9 | 41 | 35 | 53 | 2nd round | Eliminated in the Promotion play-offs quarterfinals to Siena. Folded post-season. Reggio Audace F.C., a phoenix club, was admitted to Serie D |
as Reggio Audace F.C (2018–2020)
| 2018–19 | Serie D (Group D) | IV | ↑ 3 | 34 | 19 | 9 | 6 | 57 | 28 | 66 | – | Promoted to Serie C after both Palermo and Foggia were demoted to Serie D |
| 2019–20 | Serie C (Group B) | III | ↑ 2 | 27 | 15 | 10 | 2 | 45 | 25 | 55 | – | Promoted to Serie B after winning the Promotion play-offs. Renamed back to A.C. Reggiana 1919 post-season. |
as A.C. Reggiana 1919 (2020–)
| 2020–21 | Serie B | II | ↓ 18 | 38 | 9 | 7 | 22 | 31 | 57 | 34 | 2nd round | Relegated to Serie C |
| 2021–22 | Serie C (Group B) | III | 2 | 38 | 25 | 11 | 2 | 72 | 26 | 86 | – | Eliminated in the Promotion play-offs quarterfinals to Feralpisalò |
| 2022–23 | Serie C (Group B) | III | ↑ 1 | 38 | 24 | 9 | 5 | 63 | 27 | 81 | Prelim. round | Promoted to Serie B |
| 2023–24 | Serie B | II | 11 | 38 | 10 | 17 | 11 | 38 | 45 | 47 | 2nd round | |
| 2024–25 | Serie B | II | 14 | 38 | 11 | 11 | 16 | 42 | 52 | 44 | 1st round | |
| 2025–26 | Serie B | II | ↓ 18 | 38 | 9 | 10 | 19 | 36 | 56 | 37 | 1st round | Relegated to Serie C |

== Colors and badges ==
The team's home jersey color is granata (maroon), hence the nickname "Granata" or "Regia". However, the team's shorts are traditionally dark blue, and their badge has traditionally been an orange football surrounded by the text: "Associazione Calcio Reggiana " surrounded by a Granata border.

== Stadium ==
Reggiana played all of its matches in Stadio Mirabello until 1994, when it moved to a modern arena, Stadio Città del Tricolore (a site previously known as Stadio Giglio). The stadium was subsequently bought by U.S. Sassuolo Calcio.

== Fans ==
Like other Italian cities, the birth of the "ultras" phenomenon in the 1980s also affected A.C. Reggiana. With Reggiana battling for Serie B and Cantine Riunite Reggio Emilia competing in Lega Basket Serie A, the youth of the city formed and gathered in ultras every Sunday.

The leading group of Reggiana "Curva Sud" was "Ultras Ghetto", which was famous for its choreography. Since the late 1990s, the leading groups have been "Teste Quadre" in Curva Sud (South Stand) and "Gruppo Vandelli", which located themselves in the East Stand of the stadium before rejoining Curva Sud in 2025. Reggiana fans have always had good numbers on away days with a peak of 10,000 fans in Milan in 1994.

=== Friendships and rivalries ===
Reggiana fans have good and friendly relationships with fans from:

- Genoa (twinned)
- Cremonese (twinned)
- Vicenza (twinned)
- Pisa
- Carrarese
- Greenock Morton (Scottish Championship)

The main rivals are:

- Parma, see Derby dell'Enza
- Modena, Secchia Derby
- Sassuolo, see Mapei Stadium - Città del Tricolore
- SPAL
- Spezia
- Bologna
- Piacenza

== Notable players ==
Former Reggiana players have included:

Italy

- (Italy) Andrea Silenzi
- (Italy) Paolo Ponzo
- (Italy) (Argentina) Felice Romano
- (Italy) Angelo Di Livio
- (Italy) Fabrizio Ravanelli
- (Italy) Luca Bucci
- (Italy) Stefano Torrisi
- (Italy) Francesco Antonioli
- (Italy) Angelo Adamo Gregucci
- (Italy) Filippo Galli
- (Italy) Alberico Evani
- (Italy) Luigi Sartor
- (Italy) Marco Ballotta
- (Italy) Max Tonetto
- (Italy) Cristiano Zanetti
- (Italy) Michele Padovano
- (Italy) Sandro Tovalieri
- (Italy) Francesco Pedone
- (Italy) Fabrizio Cacciatore
- (Italy) Francesco Ruopolo
- (Italy) Giuseppe Alessi
- (Italy) Alessandro Cesarini
- (Italy) Giuseppe Scienza
- (Italy) Marco Bresciani
- (Italy) Giuseppe Accardi
- (Italy) Fernando De Napoli
- (Italy) Luigi De Agostini
- (Italy) Stefano De Agostini
- (Italy) Stefano Nava
- (Italy) Massimo Paganin
- (Italy) Daniele De Vezze
- (Italy) Marco Romizi
- (Italy) Raffaele Nuzzo
- (Italy) Leonardo Colucci
- (Italy) Andrea Catellani
- (Italy) Luca Ariatti
- (Italy) Marco Ambrosio
- (Italy) Igor Protti
- (Italy) Alessandro Bastrini
- (Italy) Massimiliano Carlini
- (Italy) Trevor Trevisan
- (Italy) Marco Guidone
- (Italy) Cristian Altinier
- (Italy) Vito Grieco
- (Italy) Andrea Bovo
- (Italy) Luca Ghiringhelli
- (Italy) Simone Calvano
- (Italy) Andrea Parola
- (Italy) Raffaele Nolè
- (Italy) Michele Pazienza
- (Italy) Daniele Mignanelli
- (Italy) Federico Angiulli
- (Italy) Paolo Zanetti
- (Italy) Armando Pantanelli
- (Italy) Gian Piero Gasperini
- (Italy) Walter Mazzarri
- (Italy) Gianluca Piaccitali

Austria

- (Austria) Michael Hatz

Belgium

- (Belgium) Georges Grün

Brazil

- (Brazil) Cláudio Taffarel
- (Brazil) André Viapiana
- (Brazil) Robert Anderson

Colombia

- (Colombia) Adolfo Valencia

Croatia

- (Croatia) Bruno Petković

Czech Republic

- (Czech Republic) Edvard Lasota

Georgia

- (Georgia (country)) Georgi Nemsadze

Germany

- (Germany) Dietmar Beiersdorfer

England

- (England) Franz Carr

France

- (France) Gaël Genevier

Montenegro

- (Montenegro) Minel Šabotić
- (Montenegro) Hasim Đoković

Nigeria

- (Nigeria) Sunday Oliseh
- (Nigeria) Obafemi Martins
- (Nigeria) Mathew Olorunleke
- (Nigeria) Jero Shakpoke
- (Nigeria) Prince Ikpe Ekong
- (Nigeria) Saidu Adeshina

Portugal

- (Portugal) Paulo Futre
- (Portugal) António Pacheco
- (Portugal) Rui Águas

Romania

- (Romania) Dorin Mateut
- (Romania) Ioan Sabau
- (Romania) Vasile Mogoș

Russia

- (Russia) Igor Simutenkov

Spain

- (Spain) Marti Riverola

Sweden

- (Sweden) Johnny Ekström

Venezuela

- (Venezuela) (Italy) Massimo Margiotta

== Youth sector ==
Reggiana have always had success in developing youth players, being a rare club with a training ground which has 16 football pitches, located in the nearbies of the club house. The youth teams play their games in Stadio Mirabello, via Agosti training ground or in small grounds located in the local province.

The academy has produced various players, notably:

Italy

- (Italy) Gino Giaroli
- (Italy) Ettore Agazzani
- (Italy) Stefano Aigotti
- (Italy) Egidio Anceschi
- (Italy) Alessio Badari
- (Italy) Silvio Bandini
- (Italy) Aldo Bedogni
- (Italy) Oreste Benatti
- (Italy) Carlo Benelli
- (Italy) Roberto Benincasa
- (Italy) Andrea Costa
- (Italy) Mohammed Chakir
- (Italy) Simone Gozzi
- (Italy) Danilo Zini
- (Italy) Luca Ariatti
- (Italy) Elvis Abbruscato
- (Italy) Christian Araboni
- (Italy) Alessandro Bertoni
- (Italy) Leonida Bietti
- (Italy) Ottorino Bojardi
- (Italy) Leopoldo Bolognesi
- (Italy) Alberto Boni
- (Italy) Fabio Bonini
- (Italy) Enrico Bottazzi
- (Italy) Denis Brunazzi
- (Italy) Aldo Cagnoli
- (Italy) Giovanni Campari
- (Italy) Fabio Caselli
- (Italy) Ilario Castagner
- (Italy) Aldo Catalani
- (Italy) Andrea Catellani
- (Italy) Maurizio Cavazzoni
- (Italy) Gianluca Cherubini
- (Italy) Zucchero Fornaciari (after quitting football, he became a notorious singer)
- (Italy) Dino Galparoli
- (Italy) Lorenzo Mossini
- (Italy) Paolo Mozzini
- (Italy) Erik Panizzi
- (Italy) Armando Pantanelli
- (Italy) Jacopo Pellegrini
- (Italy) Gabriele Piccinini
- (Italy) Ayman Sanat
- (Italy) Max Tonetto

Gabon

- (Gabon) Catilina Aubameyang

Ghana

- (Ghana) Boadu Maxwell Acosty

Morocco

- (Morocco) Hachim Mastour

Nigeria

- (Nigeria) Saidu Adeshina
- (Nigeria) Stephen Makinwa
- (Nigeria) Obafemi Martins
- (Nigeria) Benjamin Onwuachi

== Players ==
=== Current squad ===
As of 31 August 2026

Note: Flags indicate national team as defined under FIFA eligibility rules; some limited exceptions apply. Players may hold more than one non-FIFA nationality.

| No. | Pos. | Nation | Player |
|---|---|---|---|
| 1 | GK | ITA | Jacopo Furlan |
| 3 | DF | ITA | Alessandro Tripaldelli |
| 4 | DF | ITA | Paolo Rozzio (captain) |
| 6 | MF | ITA | Lorenzo Crisetig |
| 8 | MF | ISL | Kristofér Jónsson |
| 9 | FW | FRA | Thomas Henry |
| 12 | GK | ITA | Francesco Borriello |
| 13 | DF | ITA | Matteo Battistini |
| 14 | DF | ITA | Danilo Quaranta |
| 16 | MF | ITA | Michele Cavion |
| 17 | DF | ITA | Lorenzo Libutti |
| 19 | MF | ITA | Damiano Basili |

| No. | Pos. | Nation | Player |
|---|---|---|---|
| 20 | MF | ITA | Michele Castagnetti |
| 21 | MF | ITA | Francesco Vallarelli |
| 22 | GK | ITA | Matteo Sorzi |
| 23 | MF | ITA | Matteo Rover |
| 25 | FW | CRO | Leon Šipoš |
| 26 | MF | ITA | Massimo Bertagnoli |
| 32 | FW | ITA | Edoardo Cavaliere |
| 33 | DF | ITA | Fabio Ponsi (on loan from Catania) |
| 43 | DF | ITA | Simone Bonetti |
| 47 | MF | ITA | Matteo Tessitori |
| 70 | MF | FRA | Samuel Ledain |
| 80 | FW | SUI | Natan Girma |
| 85 | DF | FIN | Ashton Ezinwa |
| 90 | MF | ITA | Manolo Portanova |
| 98 | DF | ITA | Tomas Lepri |

=== Out on loan ===
Note: Flags indicate national team as defined under FIFA eligibility rules; some limited exceptions apply. Players may hold more than one non-FIFA nationality.

| No. | Pos. | Nation | Player |
|---|---|---|---|
| — | DF | ITA | Andrea Bozzolan (at Palermo until 30 June 2027) |
| — | DF | ITA | Nicolò Ferretti (at Fiorenzuola until 30 June 2027) |

| No. | Pos. | Nation | Player |
|---|---|---|---|
| — | MF | NGR | Nuhu Shaibu (at Solbiatese until 30 June 2027) |
| — | MF | URU | Martín Suárez (at Renate until 30 June 2027) |

=== Reggiana 1919 Primavera ===
As of 13 September 2026

Note: Flags indicate national team as defined under FIFA eligibility rules; some limited exceptions apply. Players may hold more than one non-FIFA nationality.

| No. | Pos. | Nation | Player |
|---|---|---|---|
| — | GK | ITA | Mattia Ciaccia |
| — | GK | ITA | Federico Davoli |
| — | GK | ITA | Alessandro Denti |
| — | DF | ITA | Luca Bianchi |
| — | DF | ITA | Filippo Carpi |
| — | DF | ITA | Alberto Gilli |
| — | DF | UKR | Yaroslav Tareyev |
| — | DF | ITA | Elijah Obeng |
| — | DF | ITA | Antonino Pecorella |
| — | DF | ITA | Davide Rozzi |
| — | DF | ITA | Umberto Simoni |
| — | MF | ITA | Nicola Bellofiore |
| — | MF | ITA | Samuele Bacchi |
| — | MF | ITA | Erick Ciobanu |
| — | MF | ITA | Michael Magnanini |
| — | MF | BUL | Borislav Penkov |

| No. | Pos. | Nation | Player |
|---|---|---|---|
| — | MF | ITA | Emanuele Domini |
| — | MF | PER | Luigi Farioli |
| — | MF | ITA | Federico Po |
| — | MF | ITA | Leonardo Miceli |
| — | MF | ITA | Matteo Puccio |
| — | MF | ITA | Nicolò Turchi |
| — | FW | ALB | Leo Begolli |
| — | FW | ITA | Federico Bertolini |
| — | FW | ITA | Nicholas Bortolotti |
| — | FW | ITA | Riccardo Cavazzi |
| — | FW | ITA | Guido Obbi |
| — | FW | ITA | Francesco Corrado |
| — | FW | ITA | Mattia Propato |

== Coaching staff ==
| Manager | (Italy) Attilio Tesser |
| Assistant manager | (Germany) Giuseppe Gemiti |
| Goalkeeper Coach | (Italy) Leonardo Cortiula |
| Techinical coach | (Italy) Fabio Munzone |
| Fitness coach | (Italy) Daniele Grendene |
| Assistant fitness coach | (Italy) Francesco Benassi |
| Team manager | (Italy) Michele Malpeli |
| Head of medical staff | (Italy) Claudio Guicciardi |
| Club doctor | (Italy) Massimiliano Manzotti |
| Physiotherapist | (Italy) Remigio Del Sole (Italy) Davide Cristaudo |
| Kitman | (Italy) Matteo Ferri |

== Organizational chart ==
| Honorary president | (Italy) Romano Amadei |
| President and CEO | (Italy) Carmelo Salerno |
| Vice-president | (Italy) Giuseppe Fico |
| General Manager | (Italy) Francesco Marroccu |
| Management control manager | (Italy) Eugenio Imbergamo |
| Director of Operarions and General and sports secretary | (Italy) Nicola Simonelli |
| Director of Football | (Italy) Marco Bernardi |
| Administrative manager | (Italy) Davide Miari |
| Communications and marketing director | (Italy) Alessandro Marconi |
| Press office manager | (Italy) Andrea Montanari |
| Digital manager | (Italy) Marcello Tosi |
| Social media manager | (Italy) Chiara Bonomo |
| Sales manager | (Italy) Luca Tedeschi (Italy) Fabrizio Menozzi (Italy) Massimiliano Astrobello (Italy) Paolo Bertolini |
| Commercial secretariat | (Italy) Matteo Puntali |
| Sales representative | (Italy) Simone Gazzotti |
| Supporter liaison officer and disability access officer | (Italy) Giacomo Giovannini |
| Event management delegate | (Italy) Massimo D'Angelo |
| Deputy event management delegate | (Italy) Stefano Furlanetto |
| Referee | (Italy) Roberto Tarrachini |
| Youth sector manager | (Italy) Pietro Lodi |
| Youth sector technical director | (Italy) Maurizio Neri |
| Youth sector secretary | (Italy) Matteo Puntali |
| Organizational coordinator for pre-competitive and ground-based activities | (Italy) Fabio Dall'Omo |
| Pre-competition technical manager | (Italy) Andrea Cavicchioli |
| Technical manager for base activities | (Italy) Andrea Moratti |
| Area scouting | (Italy) Simone Rossi (Italy) Andrea Mattioli (Italy) Roberto Ferrari (Italy) Giamel Galeone |
| Manager responsible for the women's sector | (Italy) Francesco Criscuolo |
| First team organizational manager | (Italy) Giovanni Ferrari |
| Technical manager for the women's sector | (Italy) Andrea Bazzini |
| Secretariat | (Italy) Alessia Mignemi |
| Safeguarding manager | (Italy) Nicola Simonelli |

== Managers ==
The team's most famous coach was Carlo Ancelotti, who coached AC Milan from 2001 to 2009 and then managed Juventus, Chelsea, Paris Saint-Germain, Real Madrid, Bayern Munich, Napoli, Everton before returning to Real Madrid.

- 1919–20: (Kingdom of Italy) Severino Taddei
- 1920–22: (Austria) Karl Stürmer
- 1922–23: (Argentina) (Kingdom of Italy) (France) Felice Romano
- 1923–24: (Austria) Karl Stürmer
- 1924–25: (Kingdom of Italy) Severino Taddei
- 1925–26: (Kingdom of Italy) Ottorino Bojardi
- 1926: (Austria) Karl Stürmer
- 1926–28: (Kingdom of Hungary (1920–1946)) Vilmos Zsigsmond
- 1928–29: (Austria) Anton Ringer
- 1929–30: (Kingdom of Italy) Severino Taddei
- 1930–34: (Kingdom of Italy) Regolo Ferretti
- 1934–35: (Kingdom of Italy) Mora Maurer
- 1935–37: (Kingdom of Italy) Italo Rossi
- 1937–39: (Kingdom of Italy) Giuseppe Valenti
- 1939–1942: (Kingdom of Hungary (1920–1946)) János Vanicsek
- 1942: (Kingdom of Italy) Luigi Bernardi and William Ruozi
- 1942–43: (Kingdom of Italy) Alfredo Mazzoni
- 1943–44: (Kingdom of Italy) Regolo Ferretti
- 1945–46: (Argentina) (Kingdom of Italy) (France) Felice Romano
- 1946–47: (Italy) Bruno Vale
- 1947: (Italy) Alcide Violi
- 1947–48: (Italy) Angelo Mattea
- 1948–49: (Italy) Piero Ferrari
- 1949: (Italy) Bruno Arcari
- 1949–52: (Italy) Giuseppe Antonini
- 1952: (Italy) Vittorio Malagoli
- 1952–53: (Italy) Guido Masetti
- 1953–54: (Italy) Alcide Violi
- 1954–62: (Italy) Luigi Del Grosso
- 1962: (Italy) Angelo Piccioli
- 1962–63: (Italy) Renato Martini
- 1963: (Italy) Vittorio Malagoli
- 1963–64: (Italy) Giancarlo Cadé
- 1964–65: (Italy) Dino Ballacci
- 1965–70: (Italy) Romolo Bizzotto
- 1970–74: (Italy) Ezio Galbiati
- 1974: (Italy) Giampiero Grevi and Giovanni Galbiati
- 1974–75: (Italy) Tito Corsi
- 1975–76: (Italy) Carmelo Di Bella
- 1976: (Italy) Bruno Giorgi
- 1976–77: (Italy) Mario Caciagli
- 1977–79: (Italy) Guido Mammi
- 1979–80: (Italy) Franco Marini
- 1980–83: (Italy) Romano Fogli
- 1983: (Italy) Giovan Battista Fabbri
- 1983–84: (Italy) Lauro Toneatto
- 1984–86: (Italy) Franco Fontana
- 1986: (Italy) Giancarlo Cadé
- 1986–88: (Italy) Nello Santin
- 1988: (Italy) Marino Perani
- 1988–94: (Italy) Pippo Marchioro
- 1994–95: (Italy) Enzo Ferrari
- 1995: (Italy) Cesare Vitale (caretaker)
- 1995–96: (Italy) Carlo Ancelotti
- 1996: (Romania) Mircea Lucescu
- 1996–97: (Italy) Francesco Oddo
- 1997–98: (Italy) Franco Varrella
- 1998–99: (Italy) Attilio Perotti
- 1999: (Italy) Franco Varrella
- 1999: (Italy) Angelo Gregucci
- 1999–00: (Italy) Giorgio Rumignani
- 2000: (Italy) Gigi Maifredi
- 2000–01: (Italy) Claudio Testoni
- 2001–02: (Italy) Salvatore Vullo
- 2002: (Italy) Lorenzo Mossini
- 2002–03: (Italy) Adriano Cadregari
- 2003–04: (Italy) Antonio Sala
- 2004: (Italy) Adriano Cadregari
- 2004–05: (Italy) Bruno Giordano
- 2005–06: (Italy) Luciano Foschi
- 2006–09: (Italy) Alessandro Pane
- 2009–10: (Italy) Loris Dominissini
- 2010–12: (Italy) Amedeo Mangone
- 2012–13: (Italy) Lamberto Zauli
- 2013: (Italy) Gigi Apolloni
- 2013: (Italy) Lamberto Zauli
- 2013–14: (Italy) Pierfrancesco Battistini
- 2014: (Italy) Marcello Montanari (caretaker)
- 2014–16: (Italy) Alberto Colombo
- 2016–17: (Italy) Leonardo Colucci
- 2017: (Italy) Leonardo Menichini
- 2017: (Italy) Massimiliano La Rosa and Andrea Tedeschi (caretakers)
- 2017–2018: (Italy) Sergio Eberini
- 2018–2019: (Italy) Mauro Antonioli
- 2019–2021: (Italy) Massimiliano Alvini
- 2021–2023: (Italy) Aimo Diana
- 2023–2024: (Italy) Alessandro Nesta
- 2024–2025: (Italy) William Viali
- 2025–2026: (Italy) Davide Dionigi
- 2026: (Italy) Lorenzo Rubinacci
- 2026: (Italy) Pierpaolo Bisoli
- 2026-present: (Italy) Attilio Tesser

== Captains ==
- 1949–1954: (Italy) Athos Panciroli
- 1954–1956: (Italy) Dino Binacchi
- 1956–1957: (Italy) Armando Furlan
- 1957–1958: (Italy) Aldo Catalani
- 1958–1959: (Italy) Farnese Masoni
- 1959–1960: (Italy) Mario Pistacchi
- 1960–1963: (Italy) Aldo Catalani
- 1963–1970: (Italy) Giampiero Grevi
- 1970–1972: (Italy) Bruno Giorgi
- 1972–1973: (Italy) Lamberto Boranga
- 1973–1974: (Italy) Silvio Zanon
- 1974–1975: (Italy) Franco Marini
- 1975–1977: (Italy) Sileno Passalacqua
- 1977–1978: (Italy) Domenico Neri
- 1978–1979: (Italy) Massimo Berta
- 1979–1980: (Italy) Giovanni Colonnelli
- 1980–1982: (Italy) Flaviano Zandoli
- 1982–1983: (Italy) Piero Volpi
- 1983–1985: (Italy) Silvio Cei
- 1985–1986: (Italy) Domenico Tanzi
- 1986–1987: (Italy) Sergio D’Agostino
- 1987–1992: (Italy) Walter De Vecchi
- 1992–1995: (Italy) Michele Zanutta
- 1995–1996: (Italy) Gegio Sgarbossa
- 1996–1997: (Italy) Alessandro Mazzola
- 1997–1998: (Italy) Filippo Galli
- 1998–1999: (Italy) Maurizio Neri
- 1999–2000: (Italy) Sandro Tovalieri
- 2000–2001: (Italy) Alessio Pirri
- 2001–2002: (Italy) Stefano Trinchera
- 2002–2003: (Italy) Luca Ariatti
- 2003–2004: (Italy) Davide Cangini
- 2004–2005: (Italy) Marco Napolioni
- 2005–2007: (Italy) Antonio Foschini
- 2007–2008: (Italy) Vito Grieco
- 2008–2010: (Italy) Mirko Stefani
- 2010–2013: (Italy) Danilo Zini
- 2013–2015: (Italy) Beppe Alessi
- 2015–2016: (Italy) Andrea Parola
- 2016–2017: (Italy) Raffaele Nolè
- 2017–2018: (France) Gaël Genevier
- 2018–2020: (Italy) Alessandro Spanò
- 2020–present: (Italy) Paolo Rozzio

== Directors of Football ==
- 1963–1970: (Italy) Luigi Del Grosso
- 1970–1977: (Italy) Giampiero Grevi
- 1977–1978: (Italy) Tito Corsi
- 1978–1980: (Italy) Edmondo Fabbri
- 1981–1982: (Italy) Sergio Sacchero
- 1982–1983: (Italy) Moreno Roggi
- 1984–1985: (Italy) Franco Manni
- 1985–1986: (Italy) Roberto Boninsegna
- 1986–1987: (Italy) Nardino Previdi
- 1987–1994: (Italy) Renzo Corni
- 1994–1997: (Italy) Franco Dal Cin
- 1997–1998: (Italy) Riccardo Sogliano
- 1998–1999: (Italy) Guido Angelozzi
- 1999–2003: (Italy) Michele Dal Cin
- 2003–2004: (Italy) Ernesto Foglia
- 2004: (Italy) Pietro Leonardi
- 2004–2005: (Italy) Marco Valentini
- 2005–2010: (Italy) Massimo Varini
- 2010–2011: (Italy) Tito Corsi
- 2011–2012: (Italy) Totò De Falco
- 2012–2013: (Italy) Massimo Varini
- 2013–2014: (Italy) Massimo Ienca
- 2014–2016: (Italy) Italo Federici
- 2016–2017: (Italy) Andrea Grammatica
- 2017: (Italy) Doriano Tosi
- 2017–2018: (Italy) Giuseppe Magalini
- 2018–2019: (Italy) Marco Lancetti
- 2019–2022: (Italy) Doriano Tosi
- 2022–2024: (Italy) Roberto Goretti
- 2024–2025: (Italy) Marcello Pizzimenti
- 2025–2026: (Italy) Domenico Fracchiolla
- 2026: (Italy) Marco Bernardi (with Doriano Tosi as Technical Director)
- 2026: (Italy) Marco Bernardi
- 2026–present: (Italy) Marco Bernardi (with Francesco Marroccu as Techinical Director)

== Chairmen ==
- 1919–1923: (Kingdom of Italy) Giuseppe Cassoli
- 1923–1925: (Kingdom of Italy) Vittorino Palazzi Trivelli
- 1925–1928: (Kingdom of Italy) Giovanni Bonini
- 1928–1930: (Kingdom of Italy) Renato Bertolini
- 1930–1931: (Kingdom of Italy) Mario Muzzarini and Franco Fontanili
- 1931–1932: (Kingdom of Italy) Enrico Bottazzi
- 1932–1936: (Kingdom of Italy) Marcello Bofondi
- 1936–1937: (Kingdom of Italy) Giuseppe Pietranera
- 1937–1938: (Kingdom of Italy) Eugenio Bolondi
- 1938–1939: (Kingdom of Italy) Giovanni Marzi
- 1939–1941: (Kingdom of Italy) Giovanni Robba
- 1941–1942: (Kingdom of Italy) Alberto Ferrari
- 1942–1943: (Kingdom of Italy) Antonio Alessio
- 1943–1945: (Kingdom of Italy) Regolo Ferretti
- 1945–1946: (Kingdom of Italy) Carlo Visconti and Mario Curti
- 1946–1947: (Italy) Carlo Visconti
- 1947–1948: (Italy) Mario Dallaglio
- 1948–1951: (Italy) Renato Simonini
- 1951–1955: (Italy) Enzo Dal Conte
- 1955–1956: (Italy) Gianni Landini
- 1956–1965: (Italy) Carlo Visconti, Gino Lari and Giorgio Degola
- 1965–1979: (Italy) Carlo Visconti
- 1979–1982: (Italy) Franco Vacondio
- 1982–1988: (Italy) Giovanni Vandelli
- 1988–1993: (Italy) Ermete Fiaccadori
- 1993–1994: (Italy) Gianfranco Morini
- 1994–1995: (Italy) Luciano Fantinel
- 1995–1996: (Italy) Loris Fantinel
- 1996–2001: (Italy) Luciano Ferrarini
- 2001–2002: (Italy) Federico Spallanzani
- 2002–2004: (Italy) Chiarino Cimurri
- 2004–2005: (Italy) Federico Spallanzani
- 2005–2009: (Italy) Vando Veroni
- 2009–2010: (Italy) Clarfiorello Fontanesi
- 2010–2015: (Italy) Alessandro Barilli
- 2015–2016: (Italy) Stefano Compagni
- 2016–2018: (United States) (Italy) Mike Piazza
- 2018–2020: (Italy) Luca Quintavalli
- 2020–present: (Italy) Carmelo Salerno

== Honours ==
- Serie B
  - Winners (1): 1992–93
- Serie C
  - Winners (7): 1939–40, 1957–58, 1963–64, 1970–71, 1980–81, 1988–89, 2022–23
- Serie C2
  - Winners (1): 2007–08
- Supercoppa di Serie C2
  - Winners (1): 2008

== Divisional movements ==
| Series | Years | Last | Promotions | Relegations |
|---|---|---|---|---|
| A | 3 | 1996–97 | – | ▼4 (1926, 1929, 1995, 1997) |
| B | 34 | 2023–24 | ▲4 (1924, 1927, 1993, 1996) | ▼8 (1930, 1942, 1952, 1962, 1970, 1976, 1983, 1999, 2021) |
| C +C2 | 47 +3 | 2022–23 | ▲9 (1940, 1946, 1958, 1964, 1971, 1981, 1989, 2020, 2023) ▲1 (2008 C2) | ▼3 (1953, 2005✟, 2018✟) |
86 out of 90 years of professional football in Italy since 1929
| D | 4 | 2018–19 | ▲2 (1956, 2019) | never |
