= 2023–24 Frosinone Calcio season =

Frosinone Calcio
2023–24 season
- Chairman: Maurizio Stirpe
- Manager: Eusebio Di Francesco
- Stadium: Stadio Benito Stirpe
- Serie A: 18th (relegated)
- Coppa Italia: Quarter-finals
- Top goalscorer: League: Matías Soulé (11); All: Matías Soulé (11)
- Biggest win: Frosinone 3–0 Salernitana
- Biggest defeat: Atalanta 5–0 Frosinone; Frosinone 0–5 Internazionale
| Home colours | Away colours | Third colours |

The 2023–24 season was Frosinone Calcio's 119th season in existence and first season back in the Serie A. They also competed in the Coppa Italia.

== Players ==
=== First-team squad ===
As of 9 February 2024

Note: Flags indicate national team as defined under FIFA eligibility rules; some limited exceptions apply. Players may hold more than one non-FIFA nationality.

| No. | Pos. | Nation | Player |
|---|---|---|---|
| 1 | GK | ITA | Pierluigi Frattali |
| 3 | DF | ITA | Riccardo Marchizza |
| 4 | MF | ITA | Marco Brescianini |
| 5 | DF | ITA | Caleb Okoli (on loan from Atalanta) |
| 6 | DF | ITA | Simone Romagnoli (vice-captain) |
| 7 | FW | URU | Jaime Báez |
| 8 | FW | SEN | Demba Seck (on loan from Torino) |
| 9 | FW | BRA | Kaio Jorge (on loan from Juventus) |
| 10 | FW | ITA | Giuseppe Caso |
| 11 | FW | ALB | Marvin Çuni |
| 12 | MF | BRA | Reinier (on loan from Real Madrid) |
| 14 | MF | ITA | Francesco Gelli |
| 15 | MF | TUR | İsak Vural |
| 16 | MF | ITA | Luca Garritano |
| 17 | FW | GEO | Giorgi Kvernadze (on loan from Kolkheti Poti) |
| 18 | FW | ARG | Matías Soulé (on loan from Juventus) |
| 19 | MF | ITA | Nadir Zortea (on loan from Atalanta) |

| No. | Pos. | Nation | Player |
|---|---|---|---|
| 20 | DF | ESP | Pol Lirola (on loan from Marseille) |
| 21 | MF | MAR | Abdou Harroui |
| 22 | DF | GAB | Anthony Oyono |
| 23 | DF | ALB | Sergio Kalaj |
| 26 | FW | MAR | Soufiane Bidaoui |
| 27 | MF | GER | Arijon Ibrahimović (on loan from Bayern Munich) |
| 29 | FW | FRA | Farès Ghedjemis |
| 30 | DF | ITA | Ilario Monterisi (3rd captain) |
| 31 | GK | ITA | Michele Cerofolini |
| 32 | DF | ITA | Emanuele Valeri |
| 33 | DF | ITA | Kevin Bonifazi (on loan from Bologna) |
| 36 | MF | ITA | Luca Mazzitelli (captain) |
| 45 | MF | ARG | Enzo Barrenechea (on loan from Juventus) |
| 47 | DF | BRA | Mateus Lusuardi |
| 70 | FW | MAR | Walid Cheddira (on loan from Napoli) |
| 80 | GK | ITA | Stefano Turati (on loan from Sassuolo) |

=== Out on loan ===
Note: Flags indicate national team as defined under FIFA eligibility rules; some limited exceptions apply. Players may hold more than one non-FIFA nationality.

| No. | Pos. | Nation | Player |
|---|---|---|---|
| — | GK | ITA | Michele Avella (at Brescia until 30 June 2024) |
| — | DF | ITA | Gabriele Bracaglia (at Renate until 30 June 2024) |
| — | DF | POL | Przemysław Szymiński (at Reggiana until 30 June 2024) |
| — | MF | ITA | Simone Cangianiello (at Lucchese until 30 June 2024) |
| — | MF | GAM | Kalifa Kujabi (at Torres until 30 June 2024) |

| No. | Pos. | Nation | Player |
|---|---|---|---|
| — | FW | ITA | Gennaro Borrelli (at Brescia until 30 June 2024) |
| — | FW | ITA | Luigi Canotto (at Cosenza until 30 June 2024) |
| — | FW | ITA | Hamza Haoudi (at Pro Vercelli until 30 June 2024) |
| — | FW | ITA | Pierluca Luciani (at Messina until 30 June 2024) |

== Transfers ==
=== In ===
| Pos. | Player | Transferred from | Fee | Date | Source |
|---|---|---|---|---|---|
| DF | (Italy) Riccardo Marchizza | (Italy) Sassuolo | Undisclosed | 13 July 2023 | |
| MF | (Morocco) Abdou Harroui | (Italy) Sassuolo | Undisclosed | 13 July 2023 | |
| MF | (Argentina) Enzo Barrenechea | (Italy) Juventus | Loan | 15 August 2023 | |
| FW | (Morocco) Walid Cheddira | (Italy) Napoli | Loan | 21 August 2023 | |
| DF | (Spain) Pol Lirola | (France) Marseille | Loan | 28 August 2023 | |
| MF | (Argentina) Matías Soulé | (Italy) Juventus | Loan | 28 August 2023 | |
| FW | (Italy) Kaio Jorge | (Italy) Juventus | Loan | 29 August 2023 | |
| DF | (Italy) Caleb Okoli | (Italy) Atalanta | Loan | 1 September 2023 | |
| MF | (Germany) Arijon Ibrahimović | (Germany) Bayern Munich | Loan | 1 September 2023 | |
| MF | (Brazil) Reinier | (Spain) Real Madrid | Loan | 1 September 2023 | |
| MF | (Morocco) Mehdi Bourabia | (Italy) Spezia | Undisclosed | 1 September 2023 | |
| FW | (Senegal) Demba Seck | (Italy) Torino | Loan | 23 January 2024 | |

=== Out ===
| Pos. | Player | Transferred to | Fee | Date | Source |
|---|---|---|---|---|---|
| MF | (Romania) Daniel Boloca | (Italy) Sassuolo | Undisclosed | 13 July 2023 | |
| MF | (Sweden) Marcus Rohdén | (Turkey) Fatih Karagümrük | Free | 26 July 2023 | |
| MF | (The Gambia) Kalifa Kujabi | (Italy) Torres | Loan | 18 August 2023 | |
| FW | (Malta) Alexander Satariano | (Malta) Birkirkara | Free | 26 August 2023 | |
| FW | (Italy) Michele Volpe | (Italy) Alessandria | Free | 31 August 2023 | |
| DF | (Poland) Przemysław Szymiński | (Italy) Reggiana | Loan | 31 August 2023 | |
| DF | (Denmark) Lukas Klitten | Released | | 31 August 2023 | |
| FW | (Italy) Luigi Canotto | (Italy) Cosenza | Loan | 1 September 2023 | |

== Pre-season and friendlies ==
Win Draw Loss

| 15 July 2023 Friendly | Frosinone (Italy) | 15–0 | (Italy) Città di Mondragone |
| --:-- CEST (UTC+2) | | Report |

| 22 July 2023 Friendly | Frosinone (Italy) | 10–0 | (Italy) Equipe Lazio |
| 17:30 CEST (UTC+2) | | Report | | Attendance: 600; Referee: Alessandro Gemma |

| 29 July 2023 Friendly | Frosinone (Italy) | 1–1 | (Italy) Salernitana | Frosinone |
| 18:00 CEST (UTC+2) | Gelli 78' | Report | Valencia 86' | Stadium: Stadio Benito Stirpe; Attendance: 3,046; Referee: Francesco Fourneau |

| 5 August 2023 Friendly | Frosinone (Italy) | 3–3 | (Italy) Cosenza | Frosinone |
| 18:00 CEST (UTC+2) | | | | Stadium: Stadio Benito Stirpe |

| 9 September 2023 Friendly | Frosinone (Italy) | 8–0 | (Italy) Frosinone Primavera | Ferentino |
| --:-- CEST (UTC+2) | Kaio Jorge; Çuni; Caso; Báez | Report | | Stadium: Città dello Sport |

== Competitions ==
=== Overall record ===
| Competition | First match | Last match | Starting round | Final position | Record | | | | | | | |
| Competition | First match | Last match | Starting round | Final position | Pld | W | D | L | GF | GA | GD | Win % |
|---|---|---|---|---|---|---|---|---|---|---|---|---|
| Serie A | 19 August 2023 | 26 May 2024 | Matchday 1 | 18th | 38 | 8 | 11 | 19 | 44 | 69 | −25 | 21.05 |
| Coppa Italia | 11 August 2023 | 11 January 2024 | Round of 64 | Quarter-finals | 4 | 3 | 0 | 1 | 7 | 5 | +2 | 75.00 |
| Total | | | | | 42 | 11 | 11 | 20 | 51 | 74 | −23 | 26.19 |

Source: Soccerway

=== Serie A ===
==== League table ====
| Pos | Team | Pld | W | D | L | GF | GA | GD | Pts | Qualification or relegation |
|---|---|---|---|---|---|---|---|---|---|---|
| 16 | Cagliari | 38 | 8 | 12 | 18 | 42 | 68 | −26 | 36 (Note: Cagliari finished ahead of Empoli on head-to-head points: Cagliari 0–0 Empoli, Empoli 0–1 Cagliari.) | |
| 17 | Empoli | 38 | 9 | 9 | 20 | 29 | 54 | −25 | 36 | |
| 18 | Frosinone (R) | 38 | 8 | 11 | 19 | 44 | 69 | −25 | 35 | Relegation to Serie B |
| 19 | Sassuolo (R) | 38 | 7 | 9 | 22 | 43 | 75 | −32 | 30 | Relegation to Serie B |
| 20 | Salernitana (R) | 38 | 2 | 11 | 25 | 32 | 81 | −49 | 17 | Relegation to Serie B |

Source: Serie A
Rules for classification: 1) Points; 2) Tiebreaker for Champions team and third relegated team; 3) Head-to-head points; 4) Head-to-head goal difference; 5) Goal difference; 6) Goals scored; 7) Draw.
(Note: Head-to-head record is used only after all the matches between the teams in question have been played)
(R) Relegated

==== Results summary ====
| Overall | | | | | | | | Home | | | | | | Away | | | | | |
| Pld | W | D | L | GF | GA | GD | Pts | W | D | L | GF | GA | GD | W | D | L | GF | GA | GD |
|---|---|---|---|---|---|---|---|---|---|---|---|---|---|---|---|---|---|---|---|
| 38 | 8 | 11 | 19 | 44 | 69 | −25 | 35 | 7 | 4 | 8 | 28 | 32 | −4 | 1 | 7 | 11 | 16 | 37 | −21 |

Source: Serie A

==== Results by round ====
| Round | 1 | 2 | 3 | 4 | 5 | 6 | 7 | 8 | 9 | 10 | 11 | 12 | 13 | 14 | 15 | 16 | 17 | 18 | 19 | 20 | 21 | 22 | 23 | 24 | 25 | 26 | 27 | 28 | 29 | 30 | 31 | 32 | 33 | 34 | 35 | 36 | 37 | 38 |
|---|---|---|---|---|---|---|---|---|---|---|---|---|---|---|---|---|---|---|---|---|---|---|---|---|---|---|---|---|---|---|---|---|---|---|---|---|---|---|
| Ground | H | H | A | H | A | H | A | H | A | A | H | A | H | A | H | A | H | A | H | A | H | A | H | A | H | A | H | A | H | A | H | A | A | H | A | H | A | H |
| Result | L | W | D | W | D | D | L | W | L | L | W | L | W | L | D | L | L | L | L | L | W | D | L | L | L | L | D | L | L | D | D | D | D | W | D | L | W | L |
| Position | 15 | 10 | 9 | 6 | 8 | 8 | 9 | 8 | 12 | 12 | 11 | 12 | 10 | 12 | 12 | 13 | 14 | 14 | 15 | 15 | 13 | 13 | 14 | 14 | 15 | 16 | 16 | 18 | 18 | 17 | 18 | 18 | 18 | 16 | 16 | 17 | 16 | 18 |

Source: Serie A
A = Away; H = Home; W = Win; D = Draw; L = Loss

==== Matches ====
The league fixtures were unveiled on 5 July 2023.

| 19 August 2023 1 | Frosinone | 1–3 | Napoli | Frosinone |
| 18:30 CEST (UTC+2) | Harroui 7' (pen.); Oyono (yellow card) 12'; Mazzitelli (yellow card) 45+5'; Gelli (yellow card) 83' | Report | Lobotka (yellow card) 13'; Politano 24'; Cajuste (yellow card) 27'; Olivera (yellow card) 39'; Osimhen 42', 79' | Stadium: Stadio Benito Stirpe; Attendance: 15,822; Referee: Matteo Marcenaro |

| 26 August 2023 2 | Frosinone | 2–1 | Atalanta | Frosinone |
| 18:30 CEST (UTC+2) | Harroui 5'; Monterisi 24'; Barrenechea (yellow card) 28' | Report | Lookman (yellow card) 40'; De Roon (yellow card) 45+4'; Zapata 56' | Stadium: Stadio Benito Stirpe; Attendance: 13,426; Referee: Juan Luca Sacchi |

| 2 September 2023 3 | Udinese | 0–0 | Frosinone | Udine |
| 18:30 CEST (UTC+2) | Thauvin (yellow card) 64'; Kabasele (yellow card) 83' | Report | Soulé (yellow card) 31'; Báez (yellow card) 75' | Stadium: Stadio Friuli; Attendance: 20,116; Referee: Marco Guida |

| 17 September 2023 4 | Frosinone | 4–2 | Sassuolo | Frosinone |
| 15:00 CEST (UTC+2) | Romagnoli (yellow card) 34'; Cheddira 45+4' (pen.); Barrenechea (yellow card) 55'; Mazzitelli 70', 76'; Caso (yellow card) 80'; Gelli (yellow card) 82'; Lirola 90+6' | Report | Pinamonti 7', 24'; Ruan (yellow card) 45+4'; Erlić (yellow card) 80' | Stadium: Stadio Benito Stirpe; Attendance: 13,133; Referee: Alessandro Prontera |

| 22 September 2023 5 | Salernitana | 1–1 | Frosinone | Salerno |
| 18:30 CEST (UTC+2) | Mazzocchi (yellow card) 48'; Cabral 52'; Lovato (yellow card) 81' | Report | Romagnoli 12'; Caso (yellow card) 30'; Okoli (yellow card) 34'; Fazio (yellow card) 81' | Stadium: Stadio Arechi; Attendance: 16,217; Referee: Marco Piccinini |

| 28 September 2023 6 | Frosinone | 1–1 | Fiorentina | Frosinone |
| 18:30 CEST (UTC+2) | Mazzitelli (yellow card) 51'; Okoli (yellow card) 64'; Soulé 70'; Oyono (yellow card) 87' | Report | González 19'; Milenković (yellow card) 22'; Parisi (yellow card) 69'; Mandragora (yellow card) 90+2' | Stadium: Stadio Benito Stirpe; Attendance: 14,755; Referee: Francesco Fourneau |

| 1 October 2023 7 | Roma | 2–0 | Frosinone | Rome |
| 18:00 CEST (UTC+2) | Lukaku 21'; Karsdorp (yellow card) 64'; Pellegrini 83' | Report | Barrenechea (yellow card) 64'; Soulé (yellow card) 82' | Stadium: Stadio Olimpico; Attendance: 62,638; Referee: Matteo Marchetti |

| 8 October 2023 8 | Frosinone | 2–1 | Hellas Verona | Frosinone |
| 15:00 CEST (UTC+2) | Okoli (yellow card) 30'; Reinier 45+1'; Soulé 66' | Report | Coppola (yellow card) 28'; Duda (yellow card) 39'; Amione (yellow card) 40'; Suslov (yellow card) 79'; Đurić 90+4' | Stadium: Stadio Benito Stirpe; Attendance: 13,033; Referee: Maria Sole Ferrieri Caputi |

| 22 October 2023 9 | Bologna | 2–1 | Frosinone | Bologna |
| 15:00 CEST (UTC+2) | Ferguson 19'; De Silvestri 22'; Aebischer (yellow card) 59'; Zirkzee (yellow card) 88' | Report | Soulé 63' (pen.); Mazzitelli (yellow card) 88' (yellow-red card) 90+4' | Stadium: Stadio Renato Dall'Ara; Attendance: 26,729; Referee: Daniele Doveri |

| 29 October 2023 10 | Cagliari | 4–3 | Frosinone | Cagliari |
| 12:30 CET (UTC+1) | Mancosu (penalty missed) 30'; Prati (yellow card) 57'; Oristanio 72'; Makoumbou 76'; Pavoletti 90+4', 90+6' | Report | Soulé 23', 37'; Romagnoli (yellow card) 26'; Brescianini 49'; Bourabia (yellow card) 85'; Okoli (yellow card) 87'; Marchizza (yellow card) 90+5' | Stadium: Unipol Domus; Attendance: 15,936; Referee: Luca Pairetto |

| 6 November 2023 11 | Frosinone | 2–1 | Empoli | Frosinone |
| 18:30 CET (UTC+1) | Barrenechea (yellow card) 34'; Reinier (yellow card) 42'; Lirola (yellow card) 45+1'; Çuni 58'; Ibrahimović 74' | Report | Gyasi (yellow card) 44'; Ranocchia (yellow card) 76'; Caputo 86' | Stadium: Stadio Benito Stirpe; Attendance: 14,755; Referee: Gianluca Manganiello |

| 12 November 2023 12 | Internazionale | 2–0 | Frosinone | Milan |
| 20:45 CET (UTC+1) | Dimarco 43'; Çalhanoğlu 48' (pen.) | Report | Brescianini (yellow card) 71' | Stadium: San Siro; Attendance: 70,816; Referee: Federico Dionisi |

| 26 November 2023 13 | Frosinone | 2–1 | Genoa | Frosinone |
| 15:00 CET (UTC+1) | Soulé 34'; Oyono (yellow card) 58'; Reinier (yellow card) 66'; Monterisi 90+4' | Report | Vogliacco (yellow card) 6'; Sabelli (yellow card) 29'; Malinovskyi 38'; Frendrup (yellow card) 90+1' | Stadium: Stadio Benito Stirpe; Attendance: 13,999; Referee: Luca Zufferli |

| 2 December 2023 14 | Milan | 3–1 | Frosinone | Milan |
| 20:45 CET (UTC+1) | Jović 43', (yellow card) 80'; Pulisic 50'; Tomori 74' | Report | Barrenechea (yellow card) 63'; Brescianini 82' | Stadium: San Siro; Attendance: 68,848; Referee: Matteo Marchetti |

| 10 December 2023 15 | Frosinone | 0–0 | Torino | Frosinone |
| 12:30 CET (UTC+1) | Oyono (yellow card) 9'; Kaio (yellow card) 16'; Garritano (yellow card) 57' | Report | Rodriguez (yellow card) 45+3'; Ilić (yellow card) 56'; Tameze (yellow card) 57' | Stadium: Stadio Benito Stirpe; Attendance: 13,807; Referee: Luca Massimi |

| 16 December 2023 16 | Lecce | 2–1 | Frosinone | Lecce |
| 15:00 CET (UTC+1) | Piccoli 11'; Blin (yellow card) 73'; Ramadani 89' | Report | Okoli (yellow card) 24'; Kaio 33' (pen.); Ibrahimović (yellow card) 38'; Barrenechea (yellow card) 43'; Romagnoli (yellow card) 90+6' | Stadium: Stadio Via del mare Attendance: 23,645; Referee: Luca Zufferli |

| 23 December 2023 17 | Frosinone | 1–2 | Juventus | Frosinone |
| 12:30 CET (UTC+1) | Báez 51' | Report | Yıldız 12'; Cambiaso (yellow card) 20'; McKennie (yellow card) 43'; Vlahović 81' | Stadium: Stadio Benito Stirpe; Attendance: 16,020; Referee: Maurizio Mariani |

| 29 December 2023 18 | Lazio | 3–1 | Frosinone | Rome |
| 20:45 CET (UTC+1) | Patric (yellow card) 56', (goal) 84'; Castellanos 70'; Isaksen 72'; Cataldi (yellow card) 90+6' | Report | Soulé 57' (pen.); Okoli (yellow card) 75'; Barrenechea (yellow card) 78' | Stadium: Stadio Olimpico; Attendance: 40,000; Referee: Ermanno Feliciani |

| 6 January 2024 19 | Frosinone | 2–3 | Monza | Frosinone |
| 15:00 CET (UTC+1) | Monterisi (yellow card) 54'; Harroui 56'; Lusuardi (yellow card) 73'; Frattali (red card) 76'; Soulé 76' (pen.); Barrenechea (yellow card) 89' | Report | Mota 18'; Gagliardini (yellow card) 29'; Carboni 45'; Caldirola (yellow card) 51'; Soulé 55' (o.g.); D'Ambrosio (yellow card) 76'; Colombo (yellow card) 81'; Akpa Akpro (yellow card) 90+3' | Stadium: Stadio Benito Stirpe; Attendance: 13,146; Referee: Maria Sole Ferrieri Caputi |
Note: Frattali was sent off for dissent as an unused substitute.

| 15 January 2024 20 | Atalanta | 5–0 | Frosinone | Bergamo |
| 20:45 CET (UTC+1) | Koopmeiners 8' (pen.); Éderson 13'; De Ketelaere 14'; Zappacosta 83'; Holm 90' | Report | Romagnoli (yellow card) 70' | Stadium: Gewiss Stadium; Attendance: 14,195; Referee: Alessandro Prontera |

| 21 January 2024 21 | Frosinone | 3–1 | Cagliari | Frosinone |
| 12:30 CET (UTC+1) | Soulé (yellow card) 57', (goal) 75'; Mazzitelli 64'; Zortea (yellow card) 90+3'; Kaio 90+5', (yellow card) 90+7' | Report | Azzi (yellow card) 22'; Sulemana 26'; Petagna (yellow card) 62'; Dossena (yellow card) 74'; Lapadula (yellow card) 78'; Pavoletti (yellow card) 90+4' | Stadium: Stadio Benito Stirpe; Attendance: 13,925; Referee: Federico Dionisi |

| 28 January 2024 22 | Hellas Verona | 1–1 | Frosinone | Verona |
| 15:00 CET (UTC+1) | Duda (penalty missed) 37'; Suslov 45+3' (pen.); Serdar (yellow card) 45+4'; Cabal (yellow card) 86' | Report | Harroui (yellow card) 31'; Kaio 58'; Mazzitelli (yellow card) 90+1' | Stadium: Stadio Marcantonio Bentegodi; Attendance: 17,529; Referee: Federico La Penna |

| 3 February 2024 23 | Frosinone | 2–3 | Milan | Frosinone |
| 18:00 CET (UTC+1) | Soulé 24' (pen.); Harroui (yellow card) 56'; Mazzitelli 65' | Report | Giroud 17'; Loftus-Cheek (yellow card) 43'; Reijnders (yellow card) 49'; Gabbia 72'; Jović 81'; Florenzi (yellow card) 90+5' | Stadium: Stadio Benito Stirpe; Attendance: 16,050; Referee: Luca Pairetto |

| 11 February 2024 24 | Fiorentina | 5–1 | Frosinone | Florence |
| 12:30 CET (UTC+1) | Martínez Quarta (yellow card) 4', (goal) 43'; Belotti 16'; Ikoné 19'; González 53'; Terracciano (yellow card) 69'; Barák 85'; Nzola (yellow card) 90+2' | Report | Romagnoli (yellow card) 50'; Mazzitelli 66' | Stadium: Stadio Artemio Franchi; Attendance: 25,397; Referee: Ermanno Feliciani |

| 18 February 2024 25 | Frosinone | 0–3 | Roma | Frosinone |
| 18:00 CET (UTC+1) | | Report | Huijsen 38', (yellow card) 39'; Mancini (yellow card) 66'; Azmoun 71', (yellow card) 76'; Paredes 81' (pen.) | Stadium: Stadio Benito Stirpe; Attendance: 16,056; Referee: Antonio Giua |

| 25 February 2024 26 | Juventus | 3–2 | Frosinone | Turin |
| 12:30 CET (UTC+1) | Vlahović 3', 32'; Bremer (yellow card) 7'; Locatelli (yellow card) 71'; Rugani 90+5' | Report | Cheddira 14'; Brescianini 27'; Valeri (yellow card) 64'; Cerofolini (yellow card) 70' | Stadium: Juventus Stadium; Attendance: 40,719; Referee: Antonio Rapuano |

| 3 March 2024 27 | Frosinone | 1–1 | Lecce | Frosinone |
| 15:00 CET (UTC+1) | Reinier (yellow card) 44'; Cheddira 45+2' | Report | Almqvist (yellow card) 55'; Krstović (penalty missed) 61'; Cerofolini 61' (o.g.) | Stadium: Stadio Benito Stirpe; Attendance: 15,334; Referee: Marco Guida |

| 9 March 2024 28 | Sassuolo | 1–0 | Frosinone | Sassuolo |
| 15:00 CET (UTC+1) | Thorstvedt (yellow card) 23', (goal) 58'; Doig (yellow card) 32'; Laurienté (yellow card) 73' | Report | Ghedjemis (yellow card) 50'; Kaio (penalty missed) 90' | Stadium: Mapei Stadium – Città del Tricolore; Attendance: 11,189; Referee: Federico La Penna |

| 16 March 2024 29 | Frosinone | 2–3 | Lazio | Frosinone |
| 20:45 CET (UTC+1) | Lirola 13'; Barrenechea (yellow card) 55'; Cheddira 70' | Report | Pellegrini (yellow card) 34'; Zaccagni 38'; Castellanos 57', 62', (yellow card) 90+1'; Lazzari (yellow card) 88' | Stadium: Stadio Benito Stirpe; Attendance: 15,780; Referee: Antonio Rapuano |

| 30 March 2024 30 | Genoa | 1–1 | Frosinone | Genoa |
| 15:00 CET (UTC+1) | Guðmundsson 30' (pen.); Retegui (yellow card) 42'; Badelj (yellow card) 45' | Report | Reinier 36'; Zortea (yellow card) 60' | Stadium: Stadio Luigi Ferraris; Attendance: 31,462; Referee: Gianluca Aureliano |

| 7 April 2024 31 | Frosinone | 0–0 | Bologna | Frosinone |
| 12:30 CEST (UTC+2) | Romagnoli (yellow card) 43' | Report | Saelemaekers (yellow card) 12'; Kristiansen (yellow card) 71'; Lykogiannis (yellow card) 89' | Stadium: Stadio Benito Stirpe; Attendance: 14,896; Referee: Daniele Orsato |

| 14 April 2024 32 | Napoli | 2–2 | Frosinone | Naples |
| 12:30 CEST (UTC+2) | Politano 16'; Rrahmani (yellow card) 29'; Osimhen 63'; Mário Rui (yellow card) 66' (yellow-red card) 90+8' | Report | Soulé (penalty missed) 30'; Cheddira 50', 73'; Okoli (yellow card) 90+7' | Stadium: Stadio Diego Armando Maradona; Attendance: 51,000; Referee: Michael Fabbri |

| 21 April 2024 33 | Torino | 0–0 | Frosinone | Turin |
| 15:00 CEST (UTC+2) | Linetty (yellow card) 61'; Tameze (yellow card) 87' | Report | Valeri (yellow card) 34'; Okoli (yellow card) 83' | Stadium: Stadio Olimpico Grande Torino; Attendance: 23,728; Referee: Antonio Rapuano |

| 26 April 2024 34 | Frosinone | 3–0 | Salernitana | Frosinone |
| 20:45 CEST (UTC+2) | Soulé 10' (pen.); Brescianini 25'; Zortea (yellow card) 41', (goal) 85'; Mazzitelli (yellow card) 50' | Report | Sambia (yellow card) 9'; Pierozzi (yellow card) 36' | Stadium: Stadio Benito Stirpe; Attendance: 13,728; Referee: Francesco Fourneau |

| 5 May 2024 35 | Empoli | 0–0 | Frosinone | Empoli |
| 15:00 CEST (UTC+2) | Maleh (yellow card) 68'; Żurkowski (yellow card) 75' | Report | Okoli (yellow card) 18'; Valeri (yellow card) 60'; Barrenechea (yellow card) 75' | Stadium: Stadio Carlo Castellani; Attendance: 13,110; Referee: Daniele Doveri |

| 10 May 2024 36 | Frosinone | 0–5 | Internazionale | Frosinone |
| 20:45 CEST (UTC+2) | | Report | Frattesi 19'; Arnautović 60'; Buchanan 77'; Martínez 80'; Thuram 84' | Stadium: Stadio Benito Stirpe; Attendance: 16,021; Referee: Antonio Giua |

| 19 May 2024 37 | Monza | 0–1 | Frosinone | Monza |
| 15:00 CEST (UTC+2) | Bondo (yellow card) 28' | Report | Cheddira 9'; Soulé (yellow card) 47'; Gelli (yellow card) 90+2' | Stadium: Stadio Brianteo; Attendance: 12,306; Referee: Michael Fabbri |

| 26 May 2024 38 | Frosinone | 0–1 | Udinese | Frosinone |
| 20:45 CEST (UTC+2) | | Report | Pérez (yellow card) 66'; Davis 76', (yellow card) 77' | Stadium: Stadio Benito Stirpe; Attendance: 16,190; Referee: Daniele Doveri |

=== Coppa Italia ===
| 11 August 2023 Round of 64 | Frosinone | 1–0 | Pisa | Frosinone |
| 17:45 CEST (UTC+2) | Canestrelli 7' (o.g.); Romagnoli (yellow card) 55'; Monterisi (yellow card) 90' | Report | Hermannsson (yellow card) 78'; Tramoni (yellow card) 90' | Stadium: Stadio Benito Stirpe; Attendance: 3,804; Referee: Davide Ghersini |

| 2 November 2023 Round of 32 | Torino | 1–2 (a.e.t.) | Frosinone | Turin |
| 21:00 CET (UTC+1) | Zima 31' | Report | Ibrahimović 5', (yellow card) 74'; Reinier 98'; Soulé (yellow card) 109' | Stadium: Stadio Olimpico Grande Torino; Attendance: 5,233; Referee: Francesco Fourneau |

| 19 December 2023 Round of 16 | Napoli | 0–4 | Frosinone | Naples |
| 21:00 CET (UTC+1) | Cajuste (yellow card) 61'; Gaetano (yellow card) 74'; Politano (yellow card) 85' | Report | Bourabia (yellow card) 43'; Kvernadze (yellow card) 45+1'; Barrenechea 65'; Caso 70', (yellow card) 70'; Cheddira 90+1' (pen.); Harroui 90+5' | Stadium: Stadio Diego Armando Maradona; Attendance: 25,000; Referee: Rosario Abisso |

| 11 January 2024 Quarter-finals | Juventus | 4–0 | Frosinone | Turin |
| 21:00 CET (UTC+1) | Milik 11' (pen.), 38', 48'; Locatelli (yellow card) 20'; Kostić (yellow card) 32'; Yıldız 61'; Gatti (yellow card) 72' | Report | | Stadium: Juventus Stadium; Attendance: 37,940; Referee: Juan Luca Sacchi |
