= 2022–23 Frosinone Calcio season =

Frosinone
2022–23 season
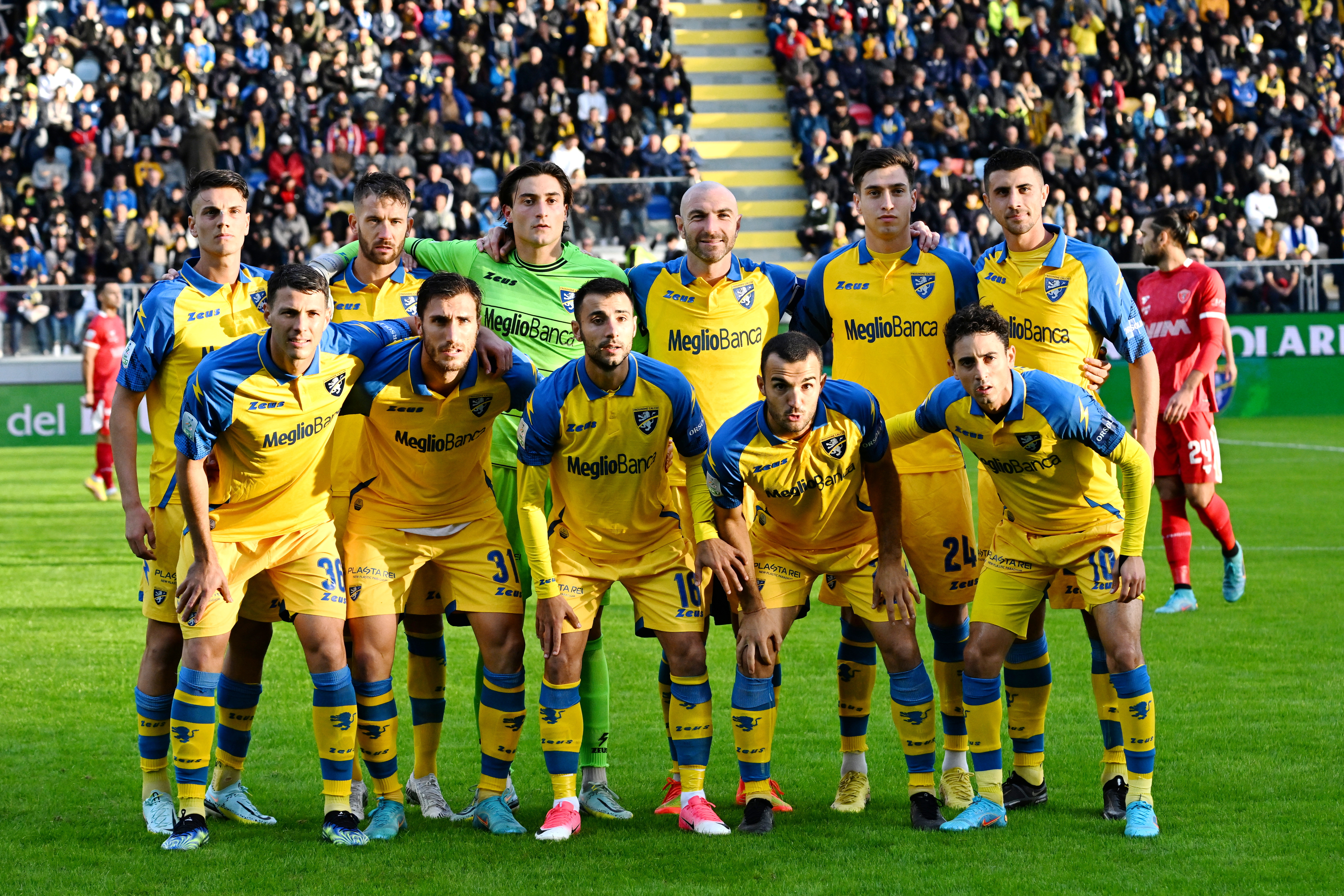
- Chairman: Maurizio Stirpe
- Manager: Fabio Grosso
- Stadium: Stadio Benito Stirpe
- Serie B: 1st (promoted)
- Coppa Italia: Round of 64
- Top goalscorer: League: Samuele Mulattieri (12); All: Samuele Mulattieri (12)

The 2022–23 season was the 111th in the history of Frosinone Calcio and their fourth consecutive season in the second division. The club participated in Serie B and the Coppa Italia.

== Players ==
As of 3 October 2022

Note: Flags indicate national team as defined under FIFA eligibility rules; some limited exceptions apply. Players may hold more than one non-FIFA nationality.

No.	Pos.	Nation	Player
1	GK	ITA	Leonardo Loria (on loan from Pisa)
2	DF	GAB	Anthony Oyono
4	MF	CIV	Ben Lhassine Kone (on loan from Torino)
5	DF	ITA	Fabio Lucioni (on loan from Lecce)
7	MF	SWE	Marcus Rohdén
8	MF	CRO	Karlo Lulić
9	FW	ITA	Samuele Mulattieri (on loan from Inter Milan)
10	FW	ITA	Giuseppe Caso
11	MF	ROU	Daniel Boloca
12	GK	ITA	Giuseppe Marcianò
13	DF	ITA	Alessio Maestrelli
16	DF	ITA	Luca Garritano
19	FW	SRB	Miloš Bočić (on loan from Pescara)
20	DF	ITA	Luca Ravanelli (on loan from Cremonese)
21	FW	ITA	Riccardo Ciervo (on loan from Sassuolo)
22	GK	ITA	Stefano Turati (on loan from Sassuolo)
23	DF	ALB	Sergio Kalaj

No.	Pos.	Nation	Player
24	FW	ITA	Luca Moro (on loan from Sassuolo)
25	DF	POL	Przemysław Szymiński
27	FW	ITA	Alessandro Selvini
29	DF	ITA	Matteo Cotali
30	DF	ITA	Ilario Monterisi (on loan from Lecce)
31	DF	ITA	Mario Sampirisi (on loan from Monza)
33	FW	ITA	Luca Matarese
36	MF	ITA	Luca Mazzitelli (on loan from Monza)
41	MF	ITA	Andrea Oliveri (on loan from Atalanta)
79	DF	ITA	Gabriele Bracaglia
90	FW	ITA	Gennaro Borrelli (on loan from Pescara)
94	MF	ITA	Roberto Insigne
99	DF	ITA	Gianluca Frabotta (on loan from Juventus)
—	GK	ITA	Lorenzo Palmisani
—	DF	ITA	Salvatore D'Elia
—	MF	GAM	Kalifa Kujabi
—	MF	FRA	Aliou Traoré

=== Out on loan ===
Note: Flags indicate national team as defined under FIFA eligibility rules; some limited exceptions apply. Players may hold more than one non-FIFA nationality.

No.	Pos.	Nation	Player
—	GK	ITA	Thomas Vettorel (at Monopoli until 30 June 2023)
—	DF	ITA	Federico Bevilacqua (at Pergolettese until 30 June 2023)
—	DF	DEN	Lukas Klitten (at Silkeborg until 30 June 2023)
—	DF	SRB	Milan Kremenovic (at Hebar Pazardzhik until 30 June 2023)
—	MF	ITA	Luigi Canotto (at Reggina until 30 June 2023)
—	MF	ITA	Matteo Ricci (at Fatih Karagümrük until 30 June 2023)

No.	Pos.	Nation	Player
—	FW	AUT	Marko Božić (at Maribor until 30 June 2023)
—	FW	ITA	Hamza Haoudi (at Turris until 30 June 2023)
—	FW	ITA	Michele Volpe (at Pergolettese until 30 June 2023)
—	FW	ITA	Pierluca Luciani (at Siena until 30 June 2023)
—	FW	ITA	Giacomo Manzari (at Monopoli until 30 June 2023, on loan from Sassuolo)
—	FW	MLT	Alexander Satariano (at Balzan until 30 June 2023)

== Pre-season and friendlies ==
Win Draw Loss Fixtures

13 July 2022 Friendly	Rappresentativa Fiuggi (Italy)	0–17	(Italy) Frosinone	Fiuggi
16:00 CEST (UTC+2)		Report		Stadium: Capo I Prati; Attendance: 250; Referee: Gianni Iannilli

16 July 2022 Friendly	Frosinone (Italy)	13–0	(Italy) Alatri	Fiuggi
17:30 CEST (UTC+2)	Moro 7', 17'; Ciano 13' (pen.), 34'; Boloca 30'; Kujabi 31'; Rohdén 36'; Parzyszek 46', 77'; Lulić 51'; Tribuzzi 66', 87' (pen.); Ciervo 80'	Report		Stadium: Capo I Prati; Attendance: 300; Referee: Di Camillo

23 July 2022 Friendly	Frosinone (Italy)	1–0	(Italy) Bari	Frosinone
18:00 CEST (UTC+2)	Moro 12'	Report		Stadium: Stadio Benito Stirpe; Attendance: 877; Referee: Matteo Marchetti

30 July 2022 Friendly	Frosinone (Italy)	3–2	(Italy) Ternana	Frosinone
18:00 CEST (UTC+2)	Lucioni 14'; Szymiński 23'; Ciervo 27'	Report	Partipilo 21'; Martella 24'	Stadium: Stadio Benito Stirpe; Attendance: 732; Referee: Ermanno Feliciani

== Competitions ==
=== Overall record ===
Competition	First match	Last match	Starting round	Final position	Record							
Competition	First match	Last match	Starting round	Final position	Pld	W	D	L	GF	GA	GD	Win %
Serie B	14 August 2022	19 May 2023	Matchday 1	Winners	38	24	8	6	63	26	+37	63.16
Coppa Italia	7 August 2022		Round of 64	Round of 64	1	0	0	1	2	3	−1	0.00
Total					39	24	8	7	65	29	+36	61.54

Source: Soccerway

=== Serie B ===
==== League table ====
Pos	Team	Pld	W	D	L	GF	GA	GD	Pts	Promotion, qualification or relegation
1	Frosinone (C, P)	38	24	8	6	63	26	+37	80	Promotion to Serie A
2	Genoa (Note: Genoa were deducted one point due to income tax payment irregularities.) (P)	38	21	11	6	53	28	+25	73	Promotion to Serie A
3	Bari	38	17	14	7	58	37	+21	65	Qualification for promotion play-offs semi-finals
4	Parma (Note: Parma were deducted one point for missing the deadline to fulfil obligations for February taxes on the salary bill.)	38	17	10	11	48	39	+9	60 (Note: Parma finished ahead of Cagliari on head-to-head points: Cagliari 1–1 Parma, Parma 2–1 Cagliari.)	Qualification for promotion play-offs semi-finals
5	Cagliari (O, P)	38	15	15	8	50	34	+16	60	Qualification for promotion play-offs preliminary round

Source: Soccerway (in English)
Rules for classification: 1) Points; 2) Head-to-head points; 3) Head-to-head goal difference; 4) Goal difference; 5) Goals scored; 6) Draw.
(C) Champions; (O) Play-off winners; (P) Promoted

==== Results summary ====
Overall								Home						Away					
Pld	W	D	L	GF	GA	GD	Pts	W	D	L	GF	GA	GD	W	D	L	GF	GA	GD
38	24	8	6	63	26	+37	80	14	3	2	35	11	+24	10	5	4	28	15	+13

Source: Serie B

==== Results by round ====
Round	1	2	3	4	5	6	7	8	9	10	11	12	13	14	15	16	17	18	19	20	21	22	23	24	25	26	27	28	29	30	31	32	33	34	35	36	37	38
Ground	A	H	A	H	A	H	A	H	A	H	A	H	A	H	A	A	H	A	H	H	A	H	A	H	A	H	A	H	A	H	A	H	A	H	H	A	H	A
Result	W	W	L	W	L	W	L	W	W	W	W	W	W	D	D	W	D	L	W	W	W	W	W	W	D	L	W	W	D	L	D	W	D	D	W	W	W	W
Position	1	1	3	1	4	3	6	5	2	1	1	1	1	1	1	1	1	1	1	1	1	1	1	1	1	1	1	1	1	1	1	1	1	1	1	1	1	1

Source: Serie B
A = Away; H = Home; W = Win; D = Draw; L = Loss

==== Matches ====
The league fixtures were announced on 15 July 2022.

14 August 2022 1	Modena	0–1	Frosinone	Modena
20:45 CEST	Panada (yellow card) 60'	Report	Rohdén 34'; Lucioni (yellow card) 45+2'; Kone (yellow card) 50'; Turati (yellow card) 78'; Boloca (yellow card) 86'	Stadium: Stadio Alberto Braglia; Attendance: 8,109; Referee: (Italy) Maria Sole Ferrieri Caputi

21 August 2022 2	Frosinone	3–0	Brescia	Frosinone
20:45 CEST	Moro 15'; Caso 58'; Oyono (yellow card) 59'; Mulattieri 85'; Ciervo (yellow card) 90+4'	Report	Karačić (yellow card) 32'; Papetti (yellow card) 50'	Stadium: Stadio Benito Stirpe; Attendance: 7,105; Referee: (Italy) Manuel Volpi

28 August 2022 3	Benevento	2–1	Frosinone	Benevento
20:45 CEST	Forte 35' (yellow card) 57' (goal) 62'; Tello (yellow card) 83'; Foulon (yellow card) 87'	Report	Lucioni (yellow card) 18'; Boloca (yellow card) 37'; Garritano 59' (yellow card) 90+4'; Cotali (yellow card) 79'	Stadium: Stadio Ciro Vigorito; Attendance: 8,418; Referee: (Italy) Luca Pairetto

3 September 2022 4	Frosinone	2–0	Como	Frosinone
20:45 CEST	Kone 22'; Cotali (yellow card) 67'; Mulattieri 71'	Report	Faragò (yellow card) 34'; Baselli (yellow card) 50'; Gabrielloni (yellow card) 90+4'	Stadium: Stadio Benito Stirpe; Attendance: 6,879; Referee: (Italy) Davide Massa

10 September 2022 5	Cittadella	1–0	Frosinone	Cittadella
14:00 CEST	Mamadou Tounkara (yellow card) 23'; Branca (yellow card) 61'; Beretta 90+2'	Report	Caso (yellow card) 45'; Boloca (yellow card) 90+1'	Stadium: Stadio Pier Cesare Tombolato; Attendance: 2,323; Referee: (Italy) Davide Ghersini

17 September 2022 6	Frosinone	1–0	Palermo	Frosinone
14:00 CEST	Boloca (yellow card) 9'; Buttaro 44' (o.g.); Cotali (yellow card) 80'; Mulattieri (yellow card) 90'; Caso (yellow card) 90+4'	Report	Marconi (yellow card) 38'; Matějů (yellow card) 47'; Bettella (yellow card) 53'; Segre (yellow card) 88'	Stadium: Stadio Benito Stirpe; Attendance: 10,406; Referee: (Italy) Antonio Giua

1 October 2022 7	Parma	2–1	Frosinone	Parma
14:00 CEST	Jurić (yellow card) 27'; Tutino 45+2' (pen.) (yellow card) 55'; Man 52' (pen.); Antoine Hainaut (yellow card) 66' (yellow-red card) 90+9'; Oosterwolde (yellow card) 68'; Del Prato (yellow card) 87'	Report	Sampirisi (yellow card) 30'; Frabotta (yellow card) 45+1'; Kone (yellow card) 54'; Garritano (yellow card) 55'; Moro 81'; Boloca (yellow card) 88'; Ravanelli (yellow card) 90+5'	Stadium: Stadio Ennio Tardini; Attendance: 8,919; Referee: (Italy) Federico Dionisi

8 October 2022 8	Frosinone	2–0	SPAL	Frosinone
16:15 CEST	Szymiński (yellow card) 19'; Caso 47'; Kone (yellow card) 69'; Cotali (yellow card) 74'; Mazzitelli 87' (yellow card) 88'	Report	Rabbi (yellow card) 43'; Arena (red card) 84'	Stadium: Stadio Benito Stirpe; Attendance: 7,268; Referee: (Italy) Giacomo Camplone

14 October 2022 9	Venezia	1–3	Frosinone	Venezia
20:30 CEST	Ceccaroni (yellow card) 25' (yellow-red card) 76'; Cheryshev 42' (yellow card) 58'; Fiordilino (yellow card) 45'	Report	Mazzitelli (yellow card) 47'; Lucioni 70'; Frabotta (yellow card) 75'; Mulattieri 85'; Borrelli 90+4'	Stadium: Stadio Pier Luigi Penzo; Referee: (Italy) Dainele Minelli

22 October 2022 10	Frosinone	1–0	Bari	Frosinone
14:00 CEST	Mazzitelli (yellow card) 32'; Moro (yellow card) 61'; Frabotta (yellow card) 71'; Rohdén (yellow card) 80'; Borrelli 90+2' (yellow card) 90+4'	Report	Bellomo (red card) 21'; Folorunsho (yellow card) 25'; Mallamo (yellow card) 39'; Ricci (yellow card) 44'	Stadium: Stadio Benito Stirpe; Attendance: 11,239; Referee: (Italy) Daniele Perenzoni

29 October 2022 11	Cosenza	1–2	Frosinone	Cosenza
14:00 CEST	Merola 20' (yellow card) 53'; Venturi (yellow card) 73'; Calò (yellow card) 90+1'	Report	Moro 27'; Ravanelli (yellow card) 30'; Lucioni (yellow card) 45+1'; Mulattieri 70'; Mazzitelli (yellow card) 76'	Stadium: Stadio San Vito-Gigi Marulla; Attendance: 3,756; Referee: (Italy) Luca Zufferli

=== Coppa Italia ===
8 August 2022 Round of 64	Monza	3–2	Frosinone	Monza
21:15 CEST (UTC+2)	Valoti 25' (pen.); Caprari 43' (pen.); Gytkjær 84'	Report	Haoudi 53'; Kone 56'	Stadium: Stadio Brianteo; Attendance: 4,432; Referee: Marco Serra
