= Riccardo Ciervo =

Italian footballer (born 2002)

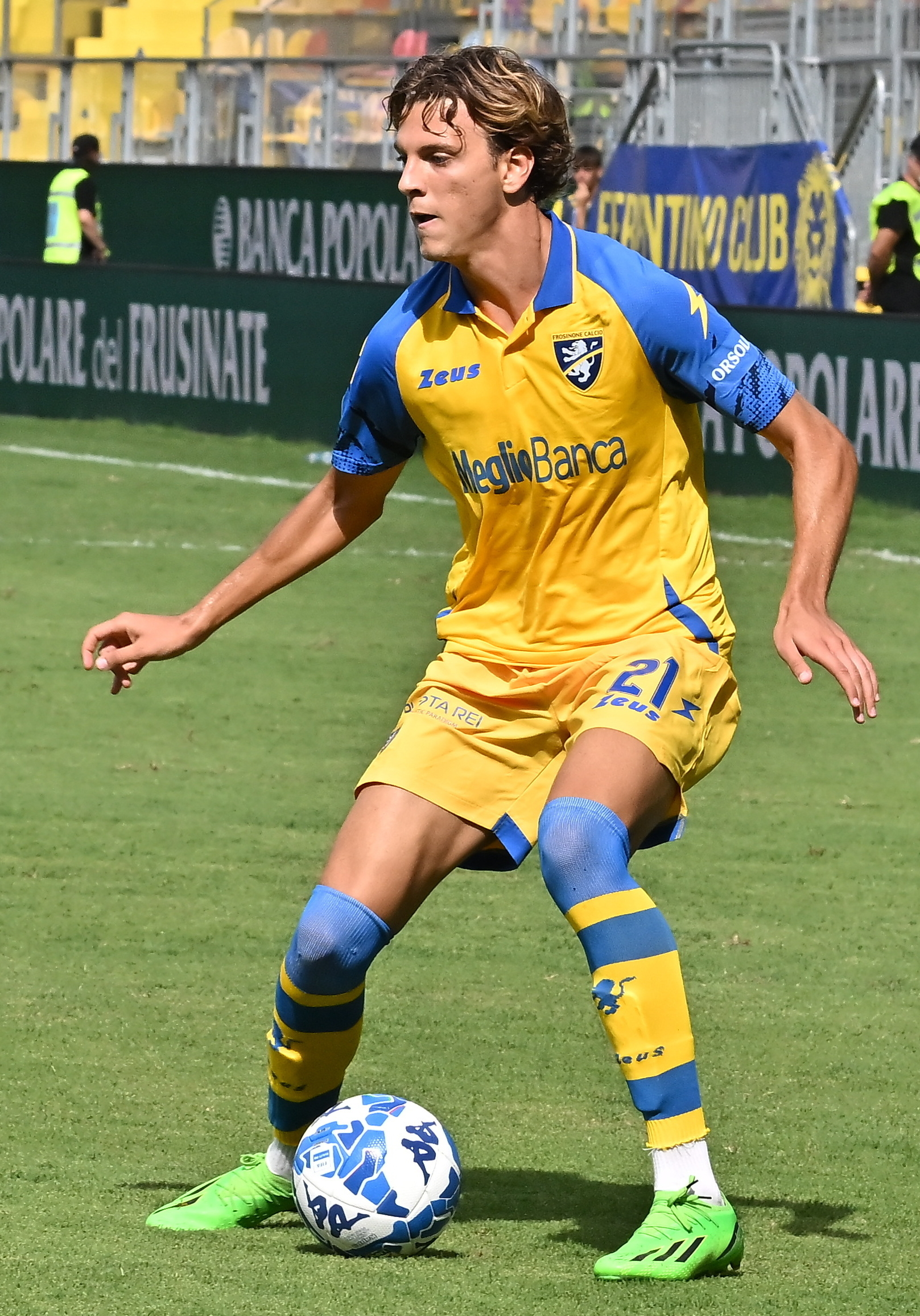

Personal information
- Date of birth: 1 April 2002 (age 24)
- Place of birth: Latina, Italy
- Height: 1.90 m (6 ft 3 in)
- Position: Right winger

Team information
- Current team: Cagliari (on loan from Sassuolo)
- Number: 20

Youth career
- 2016–2021: Roma

Senior career*
Years	Team	Apps	(Gls)
2021–2022	Roma	0	(0)
2021−2022	→ Sampdoria (loan)	10	(0)
2022	→ Sassuolo (loan)	0	(0)
2022–	Sassuolo	0	(0)
2022–2023	→ Frosinone (loan)	13	(0)
2023	→ Venezia (loan)	6	(0)
2023–2024	→ Südtirol (loan)	27	(2)
2024–2025	→ Cosenza (loan)	30	(1)
2025–2026	→ Cesena (loan)	37	(5)
2026–	→ Cagliari (loan)	1	(0)

International career
2020	Italy U18	1	(0)
2022	Italy U20	1	(0)
- * Club domestic league appearances and goals as of 31 August 2026

Riccardo Ciervo (born 1 April 2002) is an Italian professional footballer who plays as a right winger for Serie A club Cagliari, on loan from Sassuolo.

== Career ==
=== Roma ===
In the 2018–19 season, Ciervo scored five goals in 23 appearances with the under-17s of Roma helping his team to finish in the second place. The following year, Ciervo scored three goals in 13 appearances, being also called up for the under-19s for some matches. In the 2020–21 season, he scored three goals in 27 appearances. He also received many calls ups to the senior squad of Roma during the 2020–21 season, particularly for the UEFA Europa League campaign, but did not appear on the field.

==== Loan to Sampdoria ====
On 31 August 2021, he moved from Roma to Sampdoria on loan. On 23 September, he made his debut for Sampdoria (as well as his professional debut) in a 4–0 defeat against Napoli. On 16 December, he debuted as a starter in a second round Coppa Italia 2–1 win against Torino being substituted in the 70th minute.

=== Sassuolo ===
On 28 January 2022, he moved on loan to Sassuolo with a subsequent obligation to buy, which was later activated.

==== Loan to Frosinone ====
On 4 July 2022, Ciervo was loaned to Frosinone for the 2022–23 season. On 27 January 2023, he moved on a new loan to Venezia.

==== Loan to Südtirol ====
On 14 July 2023, Ciervo moved to Südtirol on loan-deal for the 2023-24 season. On 6 July 2024, Ciervo moved on a new loan to Cosenza, with an option to buy.

==== Loan to Cesena ====
On 6 August 2025, Ciervo was loaned to Cesena.

==== Loan to Cagliari ====
On 29 August 2026, Ciervo joined Serie A side Cagliari on a season-long loan with an option to buy.

== Career statistics ==
=== Club ===
As of match played 30 August 2026

Appearances and goals by club, season and competition
Club	Season	League			National Cup (Note: Includes Coppa Italia)		Europe		Other		Total	
Club	Season	Division	Apps	Goals	Apps	Goals	Apps	Goals	Apps	Goals	Apps	Goals
Roma	2020–21	Serie A	0	0	0	0	—		—		0	0
Total			0	0	0	0	—		0	0	0	0
Sampdoria (loan)	2021–22	Serie A	10	0	2	0	—		—		12	0
Sassuolo (loan)	2022–23	Serie A	0	0	0	0	—		—		0	0
Sassuolo	2022–23	Serie A	0	0	0	0	—		—		0	0
Sassuolo	2026–27	Serie A	1	0	0	0	—		—		1	0
Frosinone (loan)	2022–23	Serie B	13	0	1	0	—		—		14	0
Venezia (loan)	2022–23	Serie B	6	2	0	0	—		—		6	2
Südtirol (loan)	2023–24	Serie B	27	2	1	0	—		—		28	2
Cosenza (loan)	2024–25	Serie B	30	1	1	0	—		—		31	1
Cesena (loan)	2025–26	Serie B	37	5	1	0	—		—		38	5
Cagliari (loan)	2026–27	Serie A	1	0	0	0	—		—		1	0
Career total			125	10	6	0	—		0	0	131	10
