= Michele Avella =

Italian footballer

Personal information
- Date of birth: 1 May 2000 (age 26)
- Place of birth: Naples, Italy
- Height: 1.86 m (6 ft 1 in)
- Position: Goalkeeper

Team information
- Current team: Renate

Youth career
- –2018: Casertana
- 2016–2017: → Avellino (loan)

Senior career*
Years	Team	Apps	(Gls)
2018–2021	Casertana	29	(0)
2018–2019	→ Matelica (loan)	38	(0)
2019–2020	→ Messina (loan)	25	(0)
2021–2022	Ancona-Matelica	27	(0)
2022–2023	Virtus Francavilla	32	(0)
2023–2024	Frosinone	0	(0)
2024	→ Brescia (loan)	5	(0)
2024–2025	Brescia	0	(0)
2025–2026	Palermo	0	(0)
2026	Guidonia	9	(0)
2026–	Renate	0	(0)
- * Club domestic league appearances and goals as of 22 August 2026

Michele Avella (born 1 May 2000) is an Italian professional footballer who plays as a goalkeeper for Serie C Group A club Renate.

== Club career ==
Born in Naples, Avella started his career in Casertana youth system.

On 29 July 2019, he was loaned to Serie D club Messina.

On 11 August 2021, he joined Ancona-Matelica.

On 23 June 2022, Avella agreed to a move to Virtus Francavilla.

On 3 January 2024, Avella joined Brescia on loan with an option to buy.

On 12 June 2024, he joined Brescia on permanent basis.

On 6 September 2025, Avella joined Palermo on a free transfer.
