= Daniel Boloca =

Italian-Romanian footballer (born 1998)

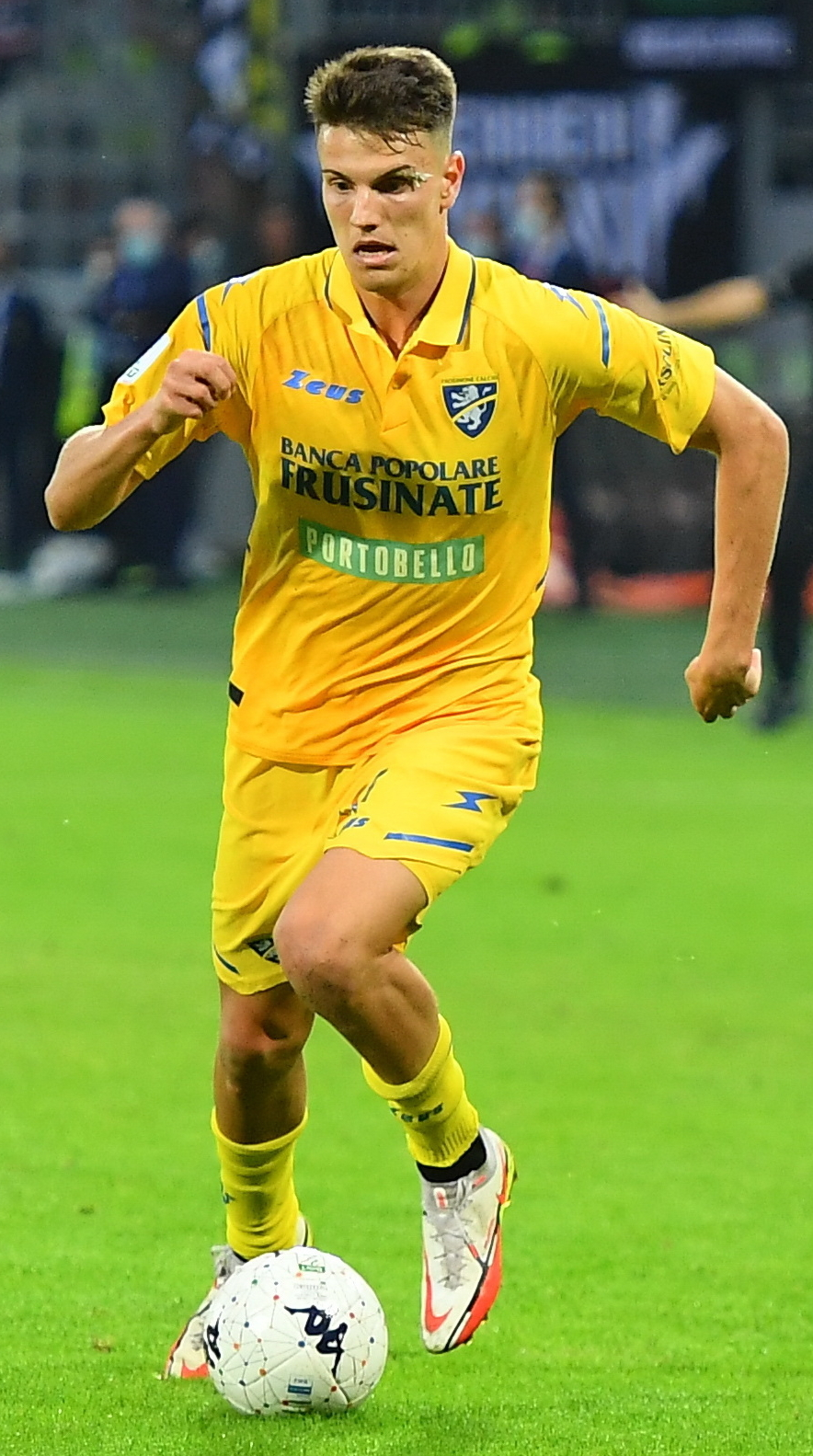
- Boloca with Frosinone in 2021

Personal information
- Date of birth: 22 December 1998 (age 27)
- Place of birth: Chieri, Italy
- Height: 1.88 m (6 ft 2 in)
- Position: Central midfielder

Team information
- Current team: Sassuolo
- Number: 11

Youth career
- 2007–2008: Torino
- 2008–2016: Juventus
- 2016: → Chieri (loan)
- 2016: Slovan Liberec
- 2017: Tatran Prešov

Senior career*
Years	Team	Apps	(Gls)
2017	Tatran Prešov	1	(0)
2017–2018	Romanese	9	(1)
2018–2019	Pro Sesto	0	(0)
2019	Francavilla	10	(0)
2019–2020	Fossano	25	(4)
2020–2023	Frosinone	80	(3)
2023–	Sassuolo	66	(5)

International career^{‡}
2022	Romania	1	(0)
- * Club domestic league appearances and goals as of 29 August 2025 ‡ National team caps and goals as of 17 November 2022

Daniel Boloca (born 22 December 1998) is a professional footballer who plays as a central midfielder for Serie A club Sassuolo. Born in Italy, he has played for the Romania national team.

== Club career ==
Born and raised in Italy to Romanian parents, Boloca started his career with the youth teams of Juventus, before leaving in 2017 to join Slovak club Tatran Prešov. He successively went on to move back to Italy, playing for a number of Serie D teams before being noted by Guido Angelozzi, sporting director of Spezia, who agreed on a three-year contract with him in May 2020; the move was however cancelled by Spezia following promotion to Serie A and a change in the club management that led to Angelozzi's departure; in November 2020, after a few months without a club, Boloca eventually signed for Serie B club Frosinone, just a few days after Angelozzi's appointment as the club's new sporting director.

At Frosinone, Boloca quickly became a regular and eventually was one of the protagonists of the first team that won the 2022–23 Serie B title under head coach Fabio Grosso.

On 13 July 2023, Boloca left Frosinone for fellow Serie A club Sassuolo.

== International career ==
Boloca made his international debut for the Romania national team on 17 November 2022, replacing Răzvan Marin in the 84th minute in a friendly against Slovenia, which ended in a 2–1 defeat for Romania.

Later that year, Roberto Mancini, the Italy national team head coach, announced that he was considering calling up Boloca, despite having already earned one cap for Romania, as that match was a friendly. On 15 December 2022, Boloca was selected to join the Azzurri for a training camp; subsequently, Boloca publicly declared his preference to play for Italy over Romania in case Mancini would choose to pick him in the future.

== Personal life ==
Boloca is the older brother of defender Gabriele Boloca.

== Career statistics ==
=== Club ===
As of match played 25 September 2025

Appearances and goals by club, season and competition
Club	Season	League			National cup (Note: Includes Coppa Italia and Coppa Italia Serie D)		Europe		Other		Total	
Club	Season	Division	Apps	Goals	Apps	Goals	Apps	Goals	Apps	Goals	Apps	Goals
Tatran Prešov	2016–17	Slovak First Football League	1	0	—		—		—		1	0
Romanese	2017–18	Serie D	9	1	—		—		—		9	1
Pro Sesto	2018–19	Serie D	0	0	0	0	—		—		0	0
Francavilla	2018–19	Serie D	10	0	—		—		—		10	0
Fossano	2019–20	Serie D	25	4	1	0	—		—		26	4
Frosinone	2020–21	Serie B	13	0	—		—		—		13	0
Frosinone	2021–22	Serie B	36	1	1	0	—		—		37	1
Frosinone	2022–23	Serie B	31	2	1	0	—		—		32	2
Frosinone	Total		80	3	2	0	—		—		82	3
Sassuolo	2023–24	Serie A	30	1	2	1	—		—		32	2
Sassuolo	2024–25	Serie B	34	4	1	0	—		—		35	4
Sassuolo	2025–26	Serie A	2	0	2	0	—		—		4	0
Sassuolo	2026–27	Serie A	0	0	0	0	—		—		0	0
Sassuolo	Total		66	5	5	1	—		—		71	6
Career total			191	13	8	1	—		—		199	14

=== International ===
As of match played 20 November 2022

Appearances and goals by national team and year
National team	Year	Apps	Goals
Romania	2022	1	0
Total		1	0

== Honours ==
Frosinone

- Serie B: 2022–23

Sassuolo

- Serie B: 2024–25
