= Kalifa Kujabi =

Gambian footballer (born 2000)

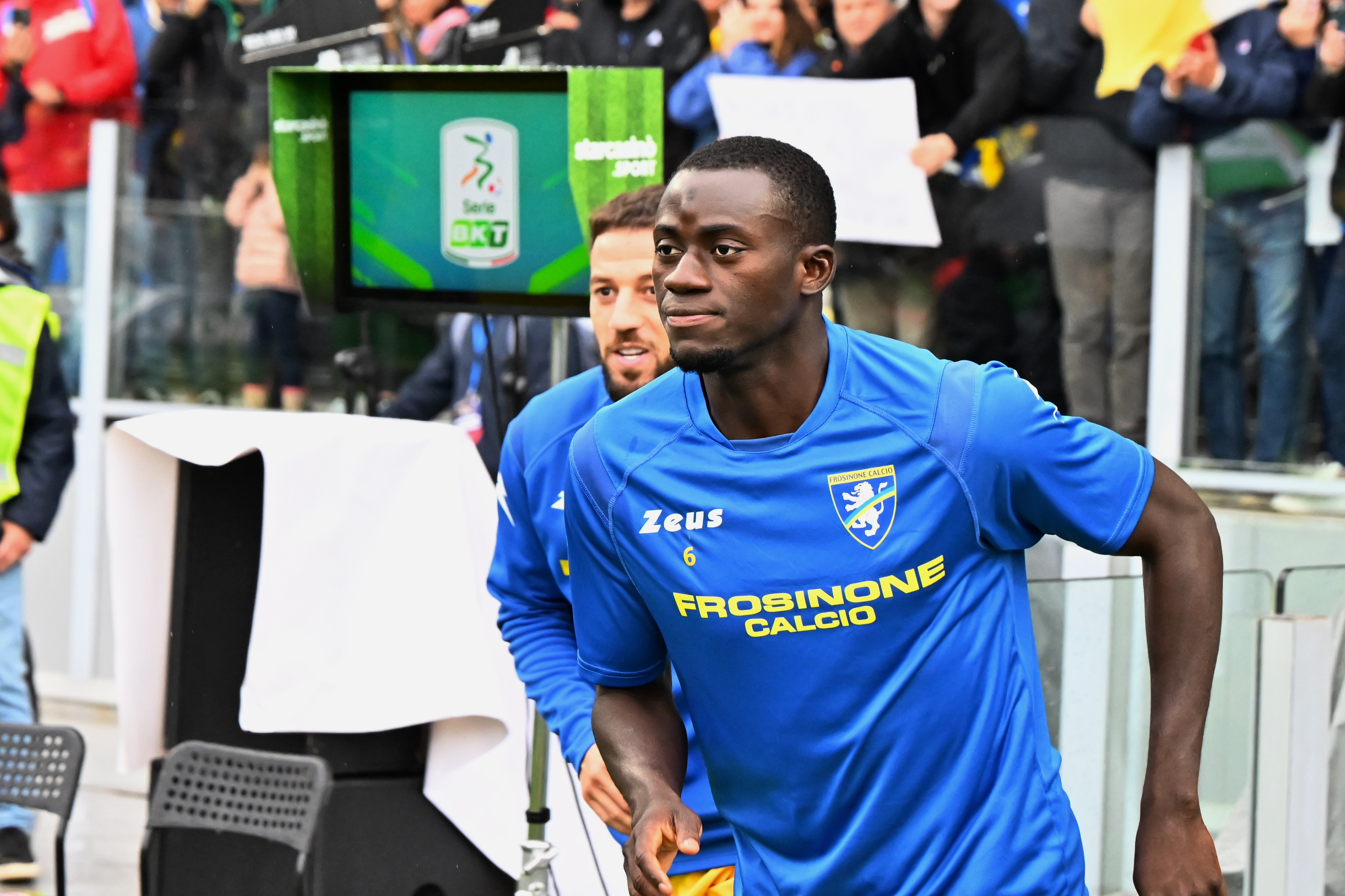
- Kujabi with Frosinone in 2023

Personal information
- Date of birth: 5 March 2000 (age 26)
- Place of birth: Abuko, the Gambia
- Height: 1.85 m (6 ft 1 in)
- Position: Central midfielder

Team information
- Current team: Ars et Labor
- Number: 6

Senior career*
Years	Team	Apps	(Gls)
2017–2019	Calcio Sicilia		
2019–2021	Muravera	33	(3)
2021–2022	Torres	30	(3)
2023–2024	Frosinone	2	(0)
2023–2024	→ Torres (loan)	18	(0)
2024	CFR Cluj	0	(0)
2024–2026	Hermannstadt	26	(1)
2026–	Ars et Labor	2	(0)
- * Club domestic league appearances and goals as of 27 October 2026

Kalifa Kujabi (born 5 March 2000) is a Gambian professional footballer who plays as a midfielder for Eccelenza club Ars et Labor Ferrara.

== Club career ==
Born in Abuko, the Gambia, Kujabi left his native country as a child, eventually arriving in Italy in 2017, when he subsequently joined a Palermo-based amateur team, Calcio Sicilia; he was then noted by a scout representing Eccellenza Sardinia club Muravera, who eventually signed him.

After winning promotion to Serie D with Muravera and playing two seasons in the Italian amateur top flight, in 2021 Kujabi joined fellow fourth-tier club Torres, where he served as a regular starter throughout the 2021–22 campaign. Following his performances, he reportedly gained the attention of several professional clubs, including Empoli, Cagliari and Torino.

In June 2022, Kujabi joined Serie B club Frosinone on a permanent deal; however, his signing was formally confirmed on 30 March 2023, due to transfer constraints regarding the Italian federation's rules on non-EU players, as well as various bureaucratic issues, including an employee mistakenly spelling his first name while registering his request for Italian citizenship.

On 20 August 2023, Kujabi officially returned to Torres, joining the Serie C club on loan for the rest of the season. He was released by Frosinone at the end of the 2023–24 season, after the club had turned down the option to extend his contract.

On 26 June 2024, it was announced that Kujabi would join Romanian side CFR Cluj on a free transfer on 1 July. However, he could not be registered by the club, due to the league's rules on non-EU players; as a result, on 5 August, he joined fellow Romanian club Hermannstadt on a three-year contract.

== Personal life ==
In 2021, Kujabi married an Italian woman from Villaputzu, Sardinia, with whom he has a daughter. In March 2023, he officially became an Italian citizen through marriage.

== Honours ==
Muravera

- Eccellenza Sardinia: 2018–19

Torres

- Coppa Italia Serie D runner-up: 2021–22

Frosinone

- Serie B: 2022–23

Hermannstadt

- Cupa României runner-up: 2024–25
