= Hamza Haoudi =

Italian footballer (born 2001)

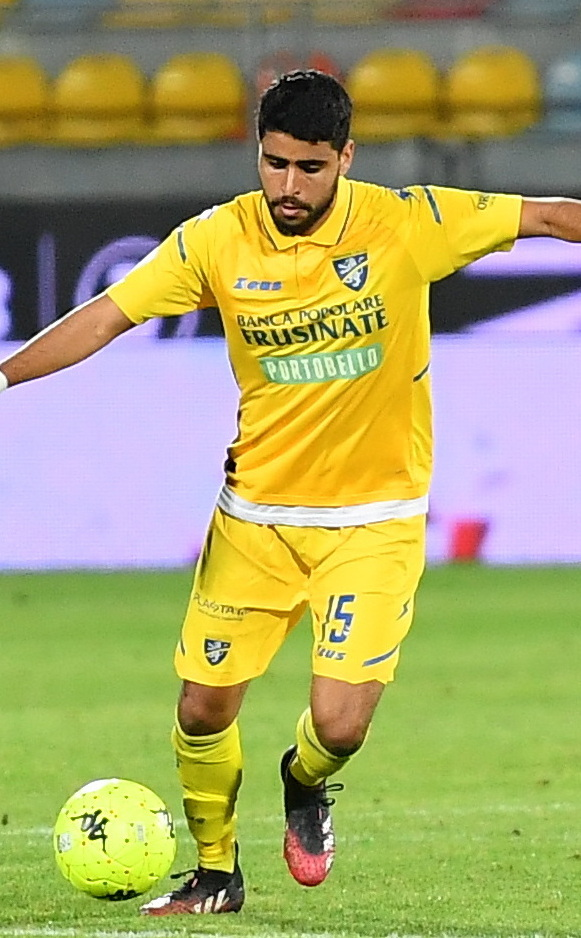
- Haoudi with Frosinone in 2021

Personal information
- Date of birth: 9 March 2001 (age 25)
- Place of birth: Lucca, Italy
- Height: 1.76 m (5 ft 9 in)
- Position: Forward

Team information
- Current team: Foggia
- Number: 16

Youth career
- –2016: Tuttocuoio Giovanili
- 2016–2018: Livorno

Senior career*
Years	Team	Apps	(Gls)
2018–2021	Livorno	38	(4)
2018–2019	→ Vorno (loan)	12	(4)
2021–2025	Frosinone	4	(0)
2022–2023	→ Turris (loan)	30	(1)
2023–2024	→ Pro Vercelli (loan)	21	(4)
2025	SPAL	9	(0)
2025–2026	Pro Vercelli	5	(0)
2026–	Foggia	1	(0)
- * Club domestic league appearances and goals as of 24 August 2026

Hamza Haoudi (born 9 March 2001) is an Italian professional footballer who plays as a forward for Serie C Group C club Foggia.

== Career ==
On 2 July 2021, Haoudi signed for Serie B side Frosinone. On 1 September 2022, Haoudi joined Turris on a season-long loan.

On 1 September 2023, Haoudi was loaned by Pro Vercelli.

On 3 January 2025, he joined Serie C side SPAL on permanent basis.

On 17 November 2025, he returned to Pro Vercelli.

== Personal life ==
Haoudi was born in Italy and is of Moroccan heritage.

== Club statistics ==
=== Club ===
As of 28 July 2020.

Club	Season	League			Cup		Other		Total	
Club	Season	Division	Apps	Goals	Apps	Goals	Apps	Goals	Apps	Goals
Livorno	2018–19	Serie B	0	0	0	0	0	0	0	0
Livorno	2019–20	Serie B	3	0	0	0	0	0	3	0
Livorno	Total		3	0	0	0	0	0	3	0
Vorno (loan)	2018–19	Eccellenza	12	4	0	0	0	0	12	4
Career total			15	4	0	0	0	0	15	4
