= Giuseppe Caso =

Italian footballer (born 1998)

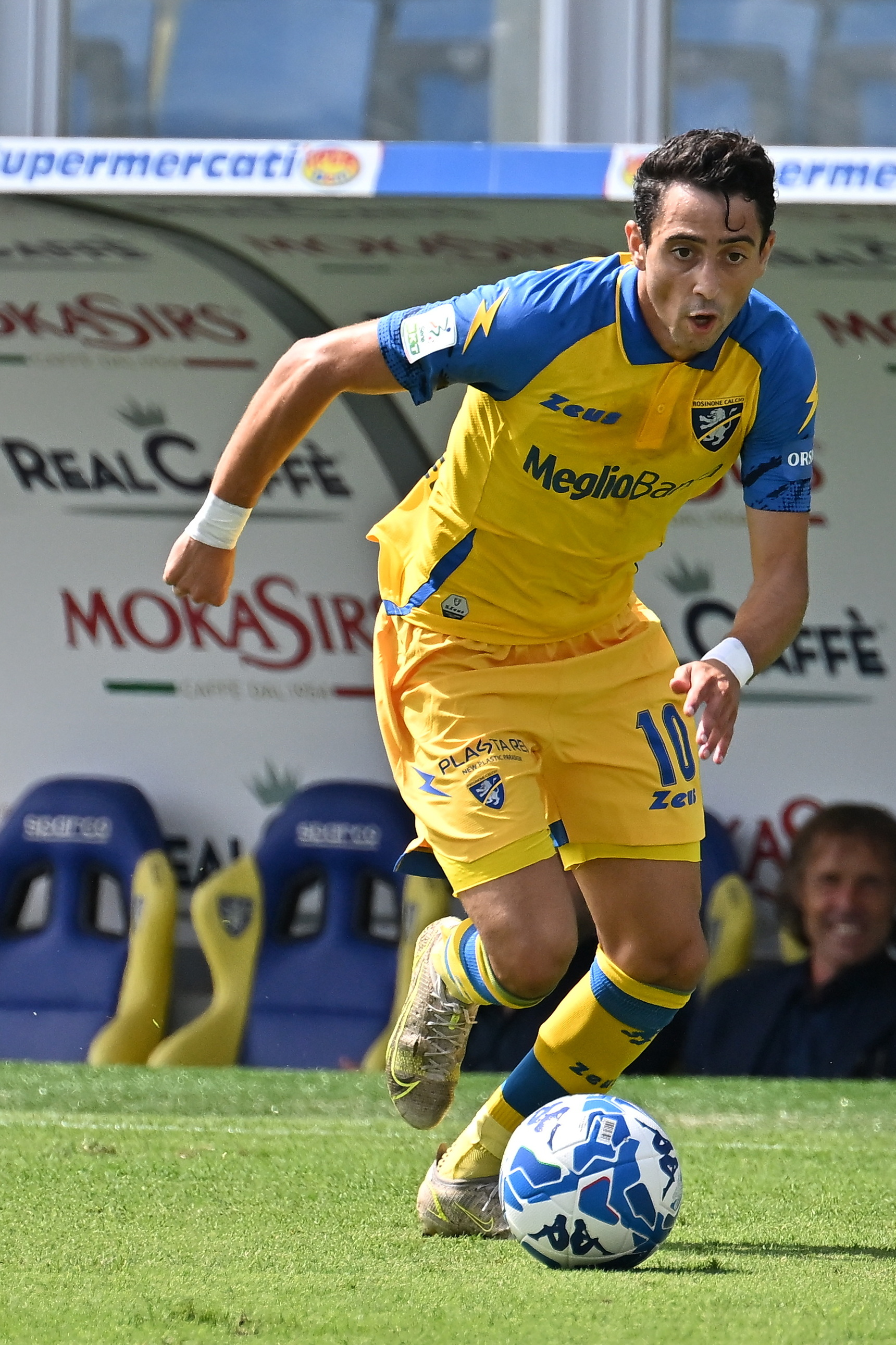

Personal information
- Date of birth: 9 December 1998 (age 27)
- Place of birth: Torre Annunziata, Italy
- Height: 1.72 m (5 ft 8 in)
- Positions: Forward; left winger

Team information
- Current team: Modena
- Number: 10

Youth career
- –2018: Fiorentina

Senior career*
Years	Team	Apps	(Gls)
2018–2019	Fiorentina	0	(0)
2018–2019	→ Cuneo (loan)	28	(1)
2019–2020	Arezzo	24	(1)
2020–2022	Genoa	2	(0)
2021–2022	→ Cosenza (loan)	37	(5)
2022–2024	Frosinone	49	(9)
2024–	Modena	32	(6)
2026	→ Monza (loan)	13	(1)
- * Club domestic league appearances and goals as of 22 August 2026

Giuseppe Caso (born 9 December 1998) is an Italian professional footballer who plays as a forward or left winger for Serie B club Modena.

== Career ==
=== Fiorentina ===
Born in Torre Annunziata, Caso was a youth exponent of Fiorentina.

==== Loan to Cuneo ====
On 19 August 2018, Caso was signed by Serie C club Cuneo on a season-long loan deal. On 17 September he made his professional debut in Serie C for Cuneo in a 1–0 away defeat against Pisa, he was replaced by Hchiam Kanis after 46 minutes. Ten days later, on 27 September, he was sent off with a double yellow card in the 79th minute of a 4–0 away defeat against Juventus U23. On 2 December he played his first entire match for the team, a 2–0 home defeat against Pontedera. Eight days later, on 10 December, he scored his first professional goal in the 79th minute of a 1–0 away win over Pro Vercelli. Caso ended his loan to Cuneo with 30 appearances, 1 goal and 2 assists.

=== Arezzo ===
On 12 July 2019, Caso joined Serie C club Arezzo on a free transfer and a two-year contract. On 11 August, he made his debut for the club as a substitute, replacing Mattia Rolando in the 53rd minute of a 4–3 away defeat against Crotone in the second round of Coppa Italia. Two weeks later, on 25 August, he made his league debut for Arezzo as a substitute, replacing Walid Cheddira in the 65th minute of a 3–1 home win over Lecco. On 23 October, Caso played his first match as a starter for Arezzo, a 1–1 away draw against Pro Vercelli. He was replaced by Aniello Cutolo in the 61st minute. Four days later, on 27 October, he scored his first goal for the club in the 63rd minute of a 2–0 home win over Giana Erminio. On 10 November, he played his first entire match for the club, a 2–1 home win over Olbia.

=== Genoa ===
On 14 September 2020, he moved to Serie A club Genoa. On 14 December 2020, he made his Serie A debut in a 1–3 home loss against Juventus.

==== Loan to Cosenza ====
On 20 August 2021, he went to Cosenza on loan.

=== Frosinone ===
On 16 July 2022, Caso moved to Frosinone on a three-year deal.

=== Modena ===
On 30 August 2024, Caso signed a three-year contract with Modena.

==== Loan to Monza ====
On 22 January 2026, Caso moved on loan to Monza, with an option to buy.

== Career statistics ==
As of 2 July 2020

Appearances and goals by club, season and competition
Club	Season	League			Cup		Europe		Other		Total	
Club	Season	League	Apps	Goals	Apps	Goals	Apps	Goals	Apps	Goals	Apps	Goals
Cuneo (loan)	2018–19	Serie C	28	1	0	0	—		2 (Note: All appearance(s) in Serie C play-out.)	0	30	1
Arezzo	2019–20	Serie C	24	1	1	0	—		—		25	1
Career total			54	2	1	0	—		2	0	57	2
