= Frosinone Calcio =

Italian professional football club

Frosinone
- Full name: Frosinone Calcio S.r.l.
- Nicknames: I Canarini (The Canaries); I Giallazzurri (The Yellow and Blues); I Ciociari (The Ciociarians)
- Founded: 1906; 120 years ago, as Unione Sportiva Frusinate; 1945; 81 years ago, as Unione Sportiva Frosinone; 1959; 67 years ago 1990; 36 years ago, as Frosinone Calcio
- Stadium: Stadio Benito Stirpe
- Capacity: 16,227
- Owner: Together S.P.A.
- President: Maurizio Stirpe
- Head coach: Massimiliano Alvini
- League: Serie A
- 2025–26: Serie B, 2nd of 20 (promoted)
- Website: frosinonecalcio.com
Home colours	Away colours	Third colours

Frosinone Calcio (Italian pronunciation: [froziˈnoːne]) is a professional football club based in Frosinone, Lazio, Italy. The club was founded on 5 March 1906 under the name Unione Sportiva Frusinate, but conventionally the year 1928 is indicated as the beginning of competitive activities of significant importance. Following cancellation by the Italian Football Federation, it was refounded in 1959 and in 1990. In the 2014–15 season the club played in Serie B for the sixth time in its history. The club earned its first promotion to the top flight Serie A in the 2015–16 season, but were relegated back down to Serie B after just one season. In the 2018–19 season it was promoted to Serie A for a second time. After winning the Serie B championship in the 2022–23 season they were promoted to Serie A for a third time.

After a long tradition of playing in Serie C, in recent years, following the historic promotion which took place in the 2005–06 season, the club participated in five consecutive seasons in Serie B, becoming, after the two teams in Rome, the third most notable team of the region of Lazio. In the club's history at a national level, Frosinone have won two championships of Serie C2 (1986–87 and 2003–04) and two of Serie D (1965–66 and 1970–71). On 16 May 2015, the Ciociari, with a 3–1 win over Crotone, secured their first, historic promotion to Serie A.

== History ==
=== Foundation and early years ===
"The "Unione Sportiva Frusinate" is established in Frosinone. The association has as its main purpose the diffusion among the younger generations of gymnastic disciplines, fencing, football and athletic sports with the aim of physical and intellectual education of Frosinone youth."

— Constitutive Act of the "Unione Sportiva Frusinate", article 1 (5 March 1906)

Frosinone Calcio was founded on 5 March 1906 under the name Unione Sportiva Frusinate. The colours of the team were originally red and blue which were later changed to the current yellow and blue. By year of foundation, the Frosinone company ranks third among those still active in the Lazio, after "S.S. Lazio" (1900) and "S.S. Formia" (1905)

On 5 March 1906, the lawyer Leone Vivoli, future mayor of Frosinone, gave birth to the "Unione Sportiva Frusinate". The objectives in the articles of association included the diffusion of various sports and among them there was explicitly included football.

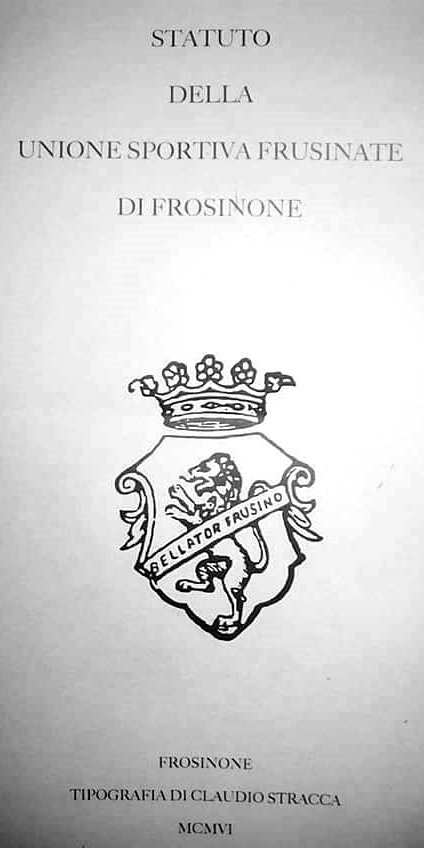
1906, Statute of the Unione Sportiva Frusinate: social coat of arms and year in Roman letters (MCMVI)

On 14 March 1906 Il Messaggero reported the news as follows: «Made up of about thirty effective members, it was formed in our city with premises in Corso Vittorio Emanuele n.2 [NB: today Corso della Repubblica] , a Frosinone sports club chaired by the lawyer Leone Vivoli. Councilors: student R. Giovannelli – accountant G. Tora – receiver G. Pesci – engineer E. Marzi – Inspector E. Toscano – Secretary Gabriele Antonucci – Sports Director Gerardo Bodin de Chadelard».

The presence of competitive football-related activities is demonstrated by some documents immediately following the signing of the company statute, including a photo dating back to 1907, taken from the Bottoni archive, which shows a youth team of Frosinone footballers probably aged between 10 and 12 years.

Il Messaggero underlined, in the edition of 1 February 1907, the feedback acquired in a short time by the new sports association in the city: «This sports union which has as its main purpose physical education, given the ever increasing number of members, has occupied new premises [...] The brilliant meeting is frequented by the most respectable people of the city who praise and encourage the healthy development of the Association».

The first corporate colours, as specified in the articles of association in article IV, were red and blue, taken from the city coat of arms. It showed a rampant lion on a red background and a blue cross band with the motto "Bellator Frusino", given by Sillo Italico, when the city refused to surrender to Hannibal's armies. Given the cost of the uniforms of the time, it is unlikely that the rossoblu uniform was worn from the beginning.

Article III of the Articles of Association stated, with a rather modern approach for the time, that the sports association abstained from any activity of a political and religious nature

The first playing field adopted by the company was located in Frosinone along today's via Cicerone (at the time called via Casilina Nord) near the municipal villa, while the historic "Stadio Matusa" (which would have resisted, with modifications and extensions subsequent, until 2017) was built only in 1932.

The same club, however, has conventionally chosen as its date of origin not the foundation of the sports club (5 March 1906), as is widely consolidated practice with illustrious examples such as the Genoa (1893) and Milan (1899)(sports clubs which included "cricket" and "football") but rather the change of name in "CXIX Legio M.V.S.N. Frosinone" and his consequent affiliation to the FIGC which took place over twenty years later, on 19 September 1928.

This method appears very unusual if we consider the establishment of many other sports clubs, such as the "Società Podistica Lazio" (which, founded in 1900, joined the FIGC in 1908 and set up a football section only in 1910) or the "Genoa Cricket and Football Club" (which became affiliated five years after being created as a sports club).

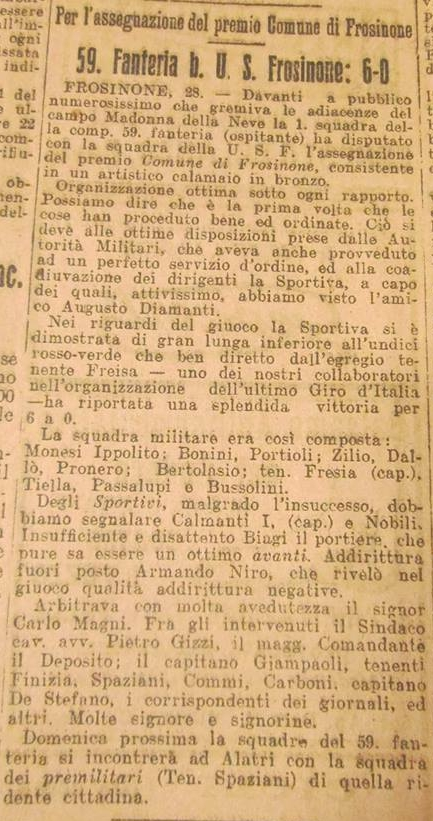
La Gazzetta dello Sport: 28 June 1922, 59º Fanteria-U.S. Frusinate

In fact, even before the change of company name induced by the fascist regime, the U.S. Frusinate had already obtained affiliation with the FIGC in 1923 and had been involved in competitive activity by appearing in the federal ranks of the championship of the Fourth Division Lazio 1923–1924 in group B. The Ciociaro team in that period at an organizational level was coordinated by Augusto Diamanti, a reference figure who was in charge of the company's executives. In the starting lineup, among others: Biagi (goalkeeper), Armando Niro, Nobili, Magni, Luigi Diamanti, Dante and Giulio Toscani, Aldo and Renato Calmanti (the latter would also be captain for many years to come, also playing in the Prima Division until the mid-1930s, when he suddenly died of a heart attack at the age of 29).

The activity of the Frosinone team at the beginning of the 1920s is testified by the sports news of the time, including an article from 1922 published in La Gazzetta dello Sport. It reports the description of the match played on 28 June 1922, at the Madonna della Neve football field in Frosinone, between the 59 º fanteria Frosinone and the U.S. Frusinate. The official meeting, directed by the referee Carlo Magni and played in the presence of the mayor Piero Gizzi and the military authorities, was valid for the assignment of the Comune di Frosinone award. The victory went to the selection of the Army for six goals to zero.

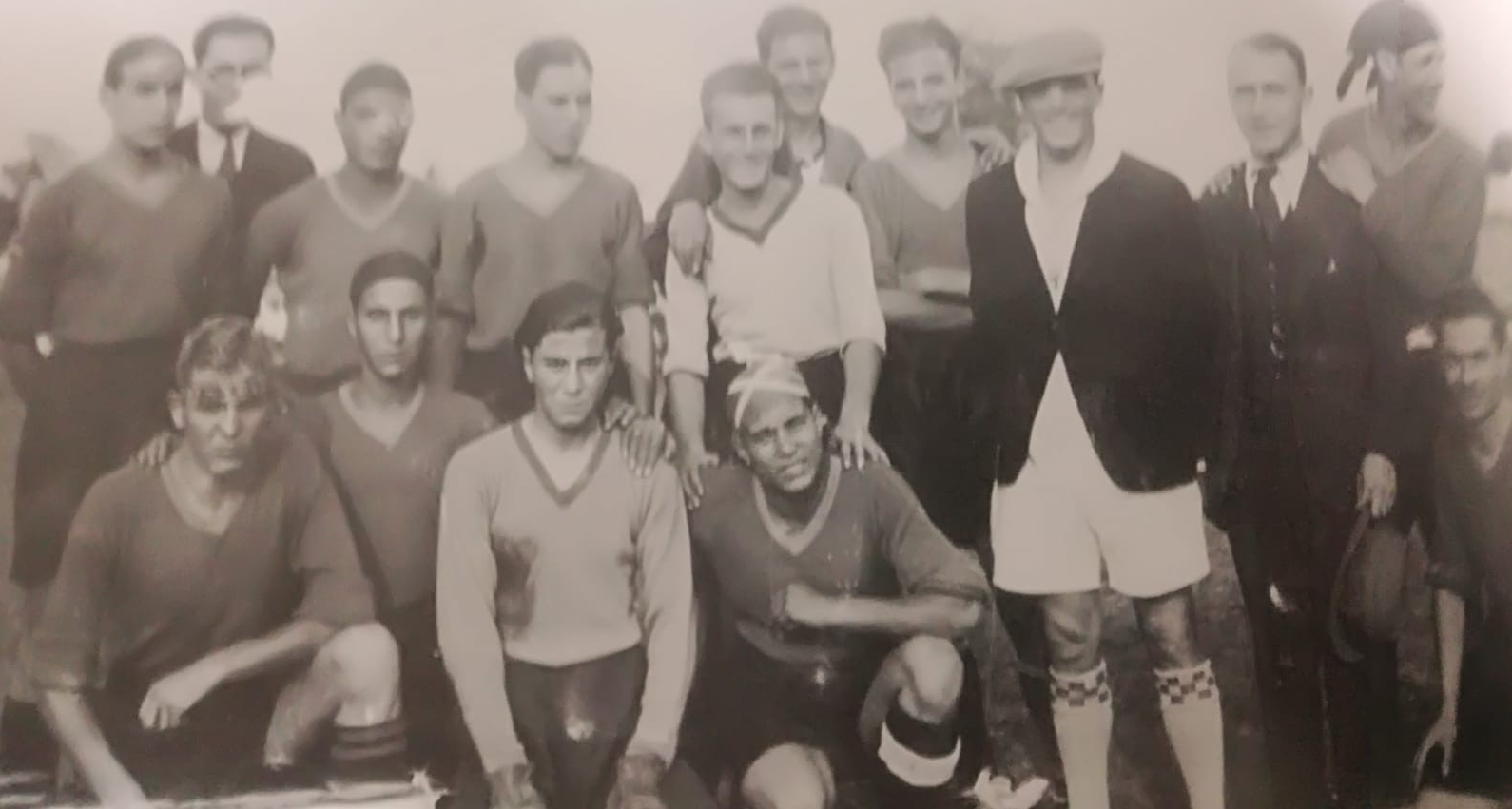
One of the first formations of the U.S. Frusinate

Experienced players such as Vincenzo Fresia, four-time champion of Italy with Pro Vercelli and former number 9 jersey in the national team were lined up in the latter's row. Who served as a lieutenant in Frosinone in the 59th Infantry Regiment

In another match played on 27 August of the same year, the Frosinone team reached the Rossoneri of the C.S. Alatri thanks to a marking by its captain Renato Calmanti. At that time the presence of category players in the military selection stimulated the competitive activity of the Unione Sportiva Frusinate, which was deployed on the field with the white and blue social colors. After affiliation to the FIGC in 1923 and registration in the IV Lazio Division, in 1925 the Unione Sportiva Frusinate passed the baton to the new Società Sportiva Alba Frusinate.

At the end of the decade sports activity in Frosinone received new impetus from the fascist policies of incentives for physical exercise and sport, as well as the economic and political expansion that the city underwent following the establishment of the new province of which it became the capital in 1927. In this context, on 19 September of the following year the company changed its name again to Gruppo Sportivo CXIX Legione M.V.S.N. Frosinone , thus joining again the Italian Football Federation. On 25 September the team registered for the third division group B championship.

On 17 October 1929 the sports newspaper Il Littorale reported the news of the affiliation of the new Polisportiva Bellator Frusino to the FIGC. The sports club, which collected the inheritance from the CXIX Legione M.V.S.N. Frosinone , was led by Pier Luigi Tinelli. The team participated in the III Division championship, group C, while the following season was included in group B

The club, later named Bellator Frusino, managed to reach the National First Division in 1934. The figure of president Emilio Frongasse was crucial in this period. In the later half of the thirties, Bellator Frusinate disbanded, and was replaced by FF.GG. Frosinone which played its football in an interprovincial tournament.

All the championships were suspended during the Second World War and the football club Frusinate disappeared.

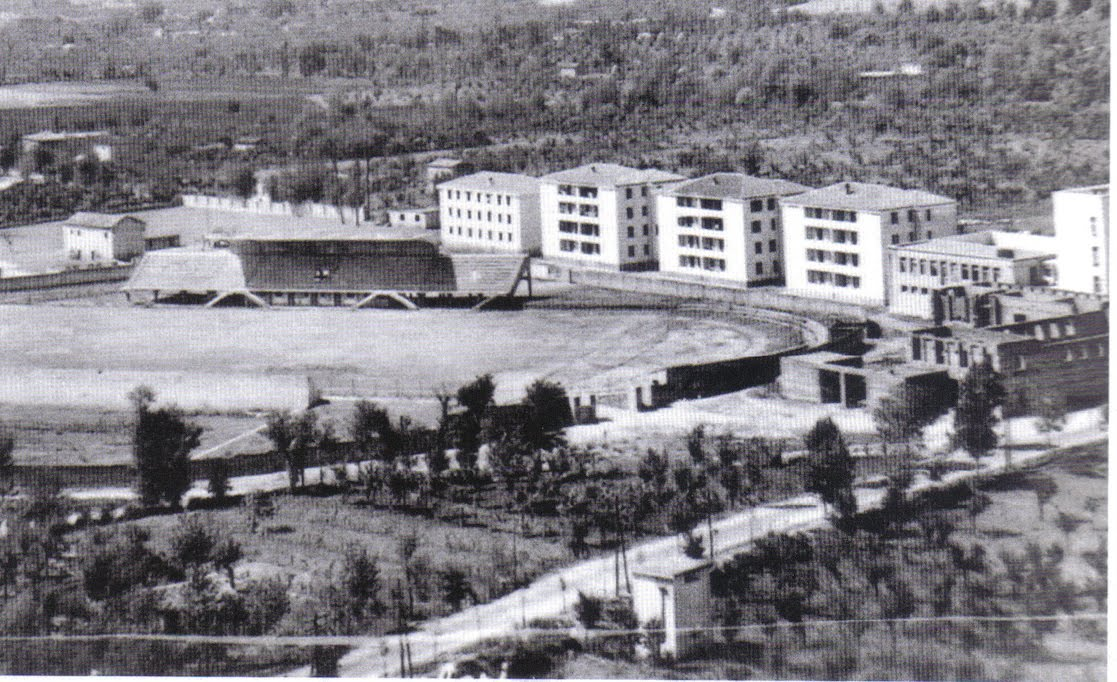
The stadium Matusa, constructed in 1932

The rebirth of Frosinone occurred in the 1945–1946 championship, the team competed in the Seconda Categoria championship and rose to Prima Categoria the following year, and later, following an excellent championship season, managed to gain promotion into Serie C-Lego Centro. From 1948 to 1949 to 1951–52, the Canarini competed in the Promozione-Interregionale della Lega Centro championship, and were included in the new Quarta Serie championship during the summer of 1952.

From 1952 to 1958, for six consecutive years, the Canarini competed in the Quarta Serie Championship, with their highest finish being fourth place, which was achieved in 1953. The most significant match this time was against Cosenza on 24 November 1957. Cosenza were playing for promotion but Frosinone took the lead (and duly won) with three minutes remaining.

The referee, struck by a Cosenza player, fell to the ground and was booed until the end of the game. Several episodes of violence then took place and the game was transformed into a "western". After leaving the stadium, the referee was chased for a few kilometers by some Frosinone supporters. Cosenza forwarded an appeal and the CAF overturned the result of the match. Frosinone expressed their resentment against the Lega for the injustice suffered and threatened to withdraw from the league. Following this, Frosinone missed the return fixture in Cosenza and other penalties by the Lega were imposed.

The most important people of this time were the presidents Domenico Ferrante and Angelo Cristofaro (one of the leading figures in the history of the club), a former coach Genta and players Azzoni, Gabriele, Diglio, Dini and Spinato.

=== 1960s–80s ===
In 1958, U.S. Frosinone was founded, competing in both the Seconda Categoria and Promozione championships. Football returned to Frosinone in 1963 when president Cristofari together with Dante Spaziani and Augusto Orsini, announced the formation of Sporting Club Frosinone. In Serie D, Frosinone always finished among the top positions, and in 1966 won promotion to Serie C after an encounter with Latina. The following year, the canarini were relegated back to Serie D, where in 1967–68 they came third, then fifth and second. The leading figures at the club during this period were the Stirpe brothers, coaches De Angelis and Rambone and players Benvenuto, Caputi, Da Col, Del Sette, Fumagalli and Trentini.

In 1970–71, Frosinone, under club president Marocco, boasted the national record for the best defence (with goalkeeper Recchia only conceding 8 goals) and again managed promotion to Serie C, where the canarini played out four good seasons (the best finish was seventh in 1972) and their star player Massimo Palanca entered the football firmament, top goalscorer of the central group of Serie C in 1974 and then later was successful representing Catanzaro in Serie A. From 1975 to 1978 the canarini played in Serie D, reaching promotion to Serie C2 in 1976–77. In 1977–78, Frosinone were again relegated back to Serie D and remained there until 1982. The club's key protagonists of the seventies were the presidents Marocco and Battista, coaches Giuseppe Banchetti and Giuseppe Lupi and players Brunello, Colletti, Dal Din, Santarelli, Masiello, Vescovi and, as mentioned earlier, Massimo Palanca. Frosinone started the next decade in the best possible way.

In 1980–81, the Canarini were promoted to Serie C2 without losing a game. Among the professionals, Frosinone managed good placements and produced new talent such as Gabbriellini, Perrotti and De Paola. Despite a precarious financial condition, Frosinone led by president Di Vito and coach Alberto Mari were promoted to Serie C1.

In 1987–88 season the Canarini played their first season in Serie C1 and finished mid-table. They returned immediately to Serie C2 the next season however despite a good start. Goalkeeper Marco Cari and coach Alberto Mari (later replaced by Robotti) were suspended for a football related betting offence. Among the most important players during the 1980s were Davato, Atzori, Di Liso, Cristiano, Bellini, Perrotti and Edoardo Artistico Poli, who then began an enviable football career.

=== Bankruptcy and return to Serie C ===
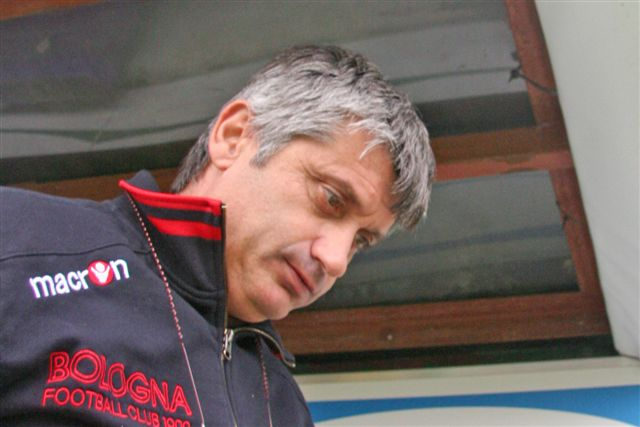
Daniele Arrigoni, manager of the Canarini in the 2003–04 season

In the summer of 1990, having missed out on promotion to C1 by just three points, Frosinone was removed from the Italian Football Federation because of their financial state. When it seemed likely that they would return to the Promozione division, the club was placed in the Interregionale, where it remained for four years.

In 1993–94, after the championship was almost completed, the Canarini ("the canaries") were overtaken by both Giulianova and Albanova, and were relegated, but they were reinstated to Serie C after the season ended.

In 1996 the club gained a mid-table placing in Serie C2, and was leading in Girone C of C2, but on the last day of the championship Frosinone was defeated by Benevento and was overtaken in the table by Avezzano. They also lost in the play-offs, being beaten in the semi-final by Albanova. They then played out three consecutive mediocre seasons. They survived the first two, in play-offs against Casertana and Albanova, but in the third year Frosinone was defeated by Tricase and relegated.

In Serie D, Frosinone finished fifth in 2000, while in their second year in Serie D the team was involved in an exciting head-to-head battle with A.C. Martina of Apulia. In the end they finished second, but with an impressive 81 points. Under president Navarra and coaches Luca and Stefano Sanderra, the team returned to Serie C2.

In their first two championships back in C2, Frosinone were managed by five different tacticians. After a good start, the team seemed able to reach the play-offs, however finished mid-table. In 2003 the club was taken over by a group of entrepreneurs led by Maurizio Stirpe, son of Benito, a former president of the club back in the sixties.

Stirpe called Enrico Graziani to Frosinone as a general director. Graziani had already worked at Teramo, gaining the Abruzzese club promotion to C1. The managerial position was entrusted to Giorgini, who had spent the previous season with Serie C2 side Brindisi. After an average start to the season, Giorgini was replaced by Daniele Arrigoni, former coach of Messina and Palermo in Serie B.

With an already strong side, including players such as Arno, Vitali, Dario Rossi, Gianluca and Stefano De Angelis, Manca, Tatomir, Galuppi and the goalkeeper de Juliis, being improved in the transfer market adding quality players such as De Cesare, Aquino and Buonocorre. Much expectation was placed upon Enrico Buonocorre, but the trequartista live up to them. He did however, score a crucial free kick in the match against Castel Di Sangro.

The team performed well in 2003–04 Serie C2 season, fighting for supremacy near the top of the table with Brindisi. The two teams will take turns to occupy first place until the very end of the season. On the final day, Frosinone, with a point less than Brindisi, travelled to Melfi, while Brindisi faced a tough trip away to Sicilian club Igea Virtus. Both Melfi and Igea were in the running for a place in the play-offs, leaving it all to play for in these two clashes. Frosinone beat Melfi thanks to a great goal by Ciro De Cesare, while Brindisi failed to beat Igea.

Frosinone were now back in Serie C1 for the first time in sixteen years. The 2003–04 season is remembered not only for the historic promotion back to C1, but also victories in the derby with Latina, with whom there is a heated rivalry. Frosinone won both matches 1–0, with goal from Manca away and Aquino scoring at home.

Upon their return to C1, which saw them travel to such historic cities as Cremona, Mantua, and Pisa, Frosinone appointed Dino Pagliari as coach, while the likes of Salvatore Mastronunzio, Di Deo (later sold to Ternana in B), Molinari, Nicola Pagani, Mauro Zaccagnini, goalkeeper Zappino, promoted, Alfredo Cariello, Davide D'Antoni, Francesco Mocarelli, Antonio Di Nardo, Michele Ischia were all signed to bolster the playing squad. Famous men who have played for Frosinone include the sport commentator Sandro Ciotti.

The season saw Frosinone go through highs and lows, in the end finishing fifth and reaching the play-offs, where they were eliminated by Mantova.

=== Serie B ===
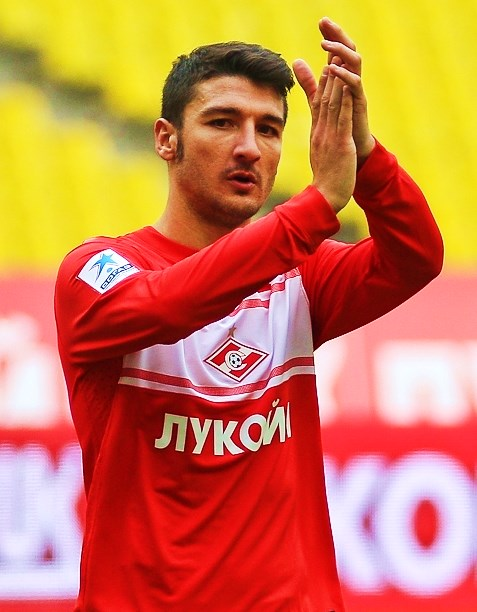
Salvatore Bocchetti, Frosinone's centre back from 2007 to 2008

In the following season, 2005–06, Frosinone were coached by Ivo Iaconi, who had offers from two Serie B teams, Fermana and Pescara, yet opted to manage the Canarini.

Several players were signed to help the club in their push for promotion including Ciro Ginestra, Stefano Bellè, Jimmy Fialdini, Paolo Antonioli, Massimo Perra, Marco Martini, Marco Ogliari and Giuseppe Anaclerio.

Despite the presence of fallen giant and former Scudetto winners Napoli in the league, Frosinone emerged as strong challengers. They began the season well, with a 4–1 victory at Perugia.

Frosinone continued their strong form right throughout the championship, finally finishing second behind Napoli and favourites to win the play-offs. Their first opponents were Tuscan side Sangiovannese, who had finished fifth. Both matches ended scoreless and Frosinone progressed to the final by virtue of their higher placed finish in the league.

In the final they met another team from Tuscany, Grosseto, drawing 0–0 at home and winning 1–0 away thanks to a goalkeeping error. For the first time ever, Frosinone were promoted to Serie B.

For their first season at Serie B level, the club made several signings to keep the team competitive. They included Massimo Margiotta, Francesco Lodi, Lucas Rimoldi and Fabio Di Venanzio. Meanwhile, work began on restructuring the Stadium Matusa, whose capacity was increased from 5,000 to almost 10,000 seats.

The first game of the season was a 1–0 loss away at the Stadio Nereo Rocco against Triestina. This was followed by draws at home against Spezia and Arezzo and another away defeat at Rimini. Their first victory came away from home at the Stadio Romeo Menti against Vicenza. It finished 2–1 with goals from Margiotta and Di Nardo.

Among the most important victories of the season were the 2–1 wins against Bologna and Lecce and the thrilling 1–0 win against Bari, where the goalkeeper Zappino saved a penalty. On 28 October 2006, Frosinone met giants Juventus. The goal from Alessandro Del Piero (his 200th for Juve) decided the game, however the Frusinati returned home with their heads held high.

The season concluded with a draw against Modena, and Frosinone finished 13th, a more than satisfactory position for their debut season.

The Canarini improved on this during their second Serie B season, finishing 10th in 2007–08, and for much of the season were in real contention for a play-off place and a highly unlikely promotion to Serie A.

On 21 May 2011, the club was relegated from Serie B to Lega Pro Prima Divisione after finishing bottom of the table.

=== From third tier to Serie A ===
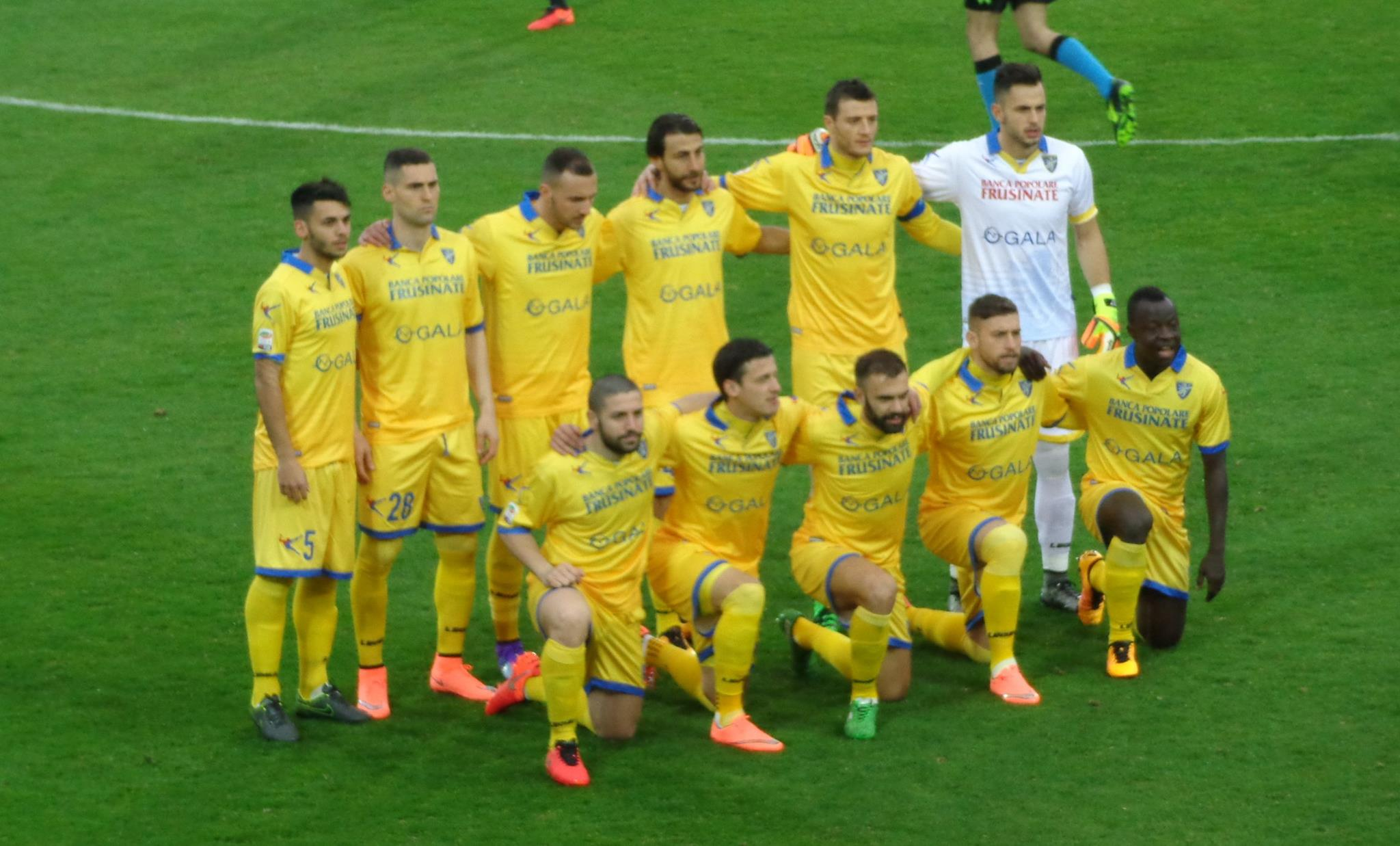
2015–16 Frosinone, at its first Serie A season

On 7 June 2014, Frosinone, under the guidance of head coach Roberto Stellone, was promoted from Lega Pro Prima Divisione to Serie B after winning the playoff 1–1, 3–1 (4–2 aggregate) against Lecce.

In the 2014–15 Serie B season, Frosinone quickly emerged as a surprise package for a Serie A spot, fighting against more renowned teams such as Vicenza and Bologna for a top flight place. On 16 May 2015, Frosinone won automatic promotion after a 3–1 home win against Crotone, six points ahead of third-placed Bologna with only one game remaining; as such, the club made its first Serie A appearance ever in the 2015–16 season.

Frosinone's maiden Serie A campaign began in a difficult style, losing their first four outings and dropping to bottom place in the table. In Round 5, the club came up against Italian football heavyweights Juventus at the Juventus Stadium. Defying all odds, Frosinone came away with their first ever Serie A point thanks to an equalising last minute Leonardo Blanchard header to end the match in a 1–1 draw. The following round, Frosinone achieved their first Serie A win, defeating Empoli 2–0 at the Stadio Matusa. Frosinone went on to pick up their second and third consecutive home wins by beating Sampdoria by the same scoreline as Empoli and fellow newly promoted side Carpi 2–1. Frosinone Calcio were relegated back to Serie B after one season in Serie A as they finished in 19th place.

On 29 May 2017, Frosinone lost the semi-final promotion playoff against Carpi, remaining in Serie B.

On 16 June 2018, Frosinone was promoted to Serie A for the second time in their history, defeating Palermo 2–0 at home to win 3–2 on aggregate in the promotion play-off finals after a 2–1 loss in the first leg. They were relegated back to Serie B after one season at top level. In their first season back in Serie B, Frosinone missed out on promotion after losing in the playoff final to Spezia.

On 25 May 2019, Frosinone was relegated again after having a bad season, and on their last matchday they tied 0–0 against Chievo Verona.

After 4 years of remaining in Serie B, on 19 May 2023, Frosinone were promoted to Serie A after being leaders on Serie B, and winning 3–2 against Ternana on they last matchday, and even beating Napoli 4–0 in the round of 16 of the Coppa Italia. In the 2023–24 Serie A season, Frosinone finished 18th on the table and were relegated back to Serie B.

In the 2024–25 Serie B season, Frosinone originally placed 16th out of 20th, and thus would've had to play in the relegation play-out against Salernitana. However, following the deduction of points from Brescia due to financial issues, Frosinone were spared from relegation play-out as a result, and placed 15th, allowing them to remain in Serie B.

== Recent seasons ==
Season	Division	Tier	Pos	Pl	W	D	L	+	-	P	Cup	Note
2016–17	Serie B	II	3	42	21	11	10	57	42	74	3rd round	Eliminated in the Promotion play-offs semifinals to Carpi
2017–18	Serie B	II	↑ 3	42	19	15	8	65	47	72	3rd round	Promoted to Serie A after winning the Promotion play-offs
2018–19	Serie A	I	↓ 19	38	5	10	23	29	69	25	3rd round	Relegated to Serie B
2019–20	Serie B	II	8	38	14	12	12	41	38	54	4th round	Lost the Promotion play-offs finals to Spezia
2020–21	Serie B	II	10	38	12	14	12	38	42	50	2nd round	
2021–22	Serie B	II	9	38	15	13	10	58	45	58	1st round	
2022–23	Serie B	II	↑ 1	38	24	8	6	63	26	80	1st round	Promoted to Serie A
2023–24	Serie A	I	↓ 18	38	8	11	19	44	69	35	Quarterfinals	Relegated to Serie B
2024–25	Serie B	II	15	38	9	16	13	37	50	43	1st round	
2025–26	Serie B	II	↑ 2	38	23	12	3	76	34	81	2nd round	Promoted to Serie A
2026–27	Serie A	I										

== Colours and symbols ==
The first social colours of the club were red and blue. Now they are yellow and blue. From the 2007–08 season, the club has a mascot called Lillo, represented by a lion, the animal that appears in the coat of arms. The name was chosen by fans of Frosinone with a poll on the club's official website. The mascot accompanies the home team and from the 2008–09 season there is also a chance to be selected, on request, to impersonate Lillo for a game.

== Players ==
=== Current squad ===
As of 9 September 2026

Note: Flags indicate national team as defined under FIFA eligibility rules; some limited exceptions apply. Players may hold more than one non-FIFA nationality.

No.	Pos.	Nation	Player
2	DF	ITA	Giorgio Cittadini (on loan from Atalanta)
3	DF	ITA	Gabriele Calvani (on loan from Genoa)
4	MF	CIV	Ben Lhassine Kone
5	DF	ITA	Wisdom Amey (on loan from Bologna)
7	FW	ALG	Farès Ghedjemis
9	FW	ITA	Antonio Raimondo (on loan from Bologna)
10	MF	AUT	Romano Schmid
11	FW	ROU	Daniel Bîrligea (on loan from FCSB)
12	GK	ITA	Matteo Pisseri
14	MF	ITA	Giacomo Calò
16	MF	ITA	Matteo Cichella
17	FW	GEO	Giorgi Kvernadze
20	DF	GAB	Anthony Oyono
22	GK	ITA	Lorenzo Palmisani

No.	Pos.	Nation	Player
24	FW	ITA	Alessio Zerbin
25	DF	NGR	Kevin Akpoguma
27	MF	AUT	Florian Grillitsch
30	DF	ITA	Ilario Monterisi (Captain)
34	MF	MAR	Anouar El Azzouzi
40	FW	ITA	Seydou Fini (on loan from Genoa)
70	FW	ALB	Luis Hasa
71	DF	SRB	Aleksa Terzić
73	MF	ITA	Patrizio Masini (on loan from Genoa)
74	DF	EGY	Omar Fayed
79	DF	ITA	Gabriele Bracaglia
89	FW	SVK	Tomáš Bobček
90	DF	CMR	Enzo Tchato
91	GK	ITA	Sebastiano Desplanches (on loan from Palermo)
96	MF	ITA	Francesco Gelli
—	GK	BIH	Eldin Lolić

=== Out on loan ===
As of 9 September 2026

Note: Flags indicate national team as defined under FIFA eligibility rules; some limited exceptions apply. Players may hold more than one non-FIFA nationality.

No.	Pos.	Nation	Player
—	DF	ITA	Niccolò Corrado (at Empoli until 30 June 2027)
—	DF	GAB	Jérémy Oyono (at Spezia until 30 June 2027)
—	MF	ITA	Kevin Barcella (at Crotone until 30 June 2027)
—	MF	ITA	Jacopo Gelli (at Cesena until 30 June 2027)
—	MF	ITA	Filippo Grosso (at Crotone until 30 June 2027)

No.	Pos.	Nation	Player
—	FW	ITA	Lorenzo Befani (at Torino U19 until 30 June 2027)
—	FW	VEN	Alejandro Cichero (at Paradiso until 30 June 2027)
—	FW	GAM	Muhammed Colley (at Casertana until 30 June 2027)
—	FW	CAN	Damar Dixon (at Toronto FC II until 30 June 2027)
—	FW	ITA	Lorenzo Gori (at Grosseto until 30 June 2027)

== Coaching staff ==
Position	Name
Head coach	(Italy) Massimiliano Alvini
Assistant coach	(Italy) Renato Montagnolo
Technical coach	(Italy) Francesco Bonacci (Italy) Pierluigi Frattali
Goalkeeper coach	(Italy) Matteo Di Norscia
Head of athletic coach	(Italy) Claudio Giuntoli
Athletic coach	(Italy) Alessandro Fonte
Match analyst	(Italy) Dario Sciotti
Rehab coach	(Italy) Maurizio Baldini
Physiotherapist	(Italy) Gianluca Capogna
Chief doctor	(Italy) Sandra Spaziani (Italy) Claudio Raviglia

== Stadiums ==
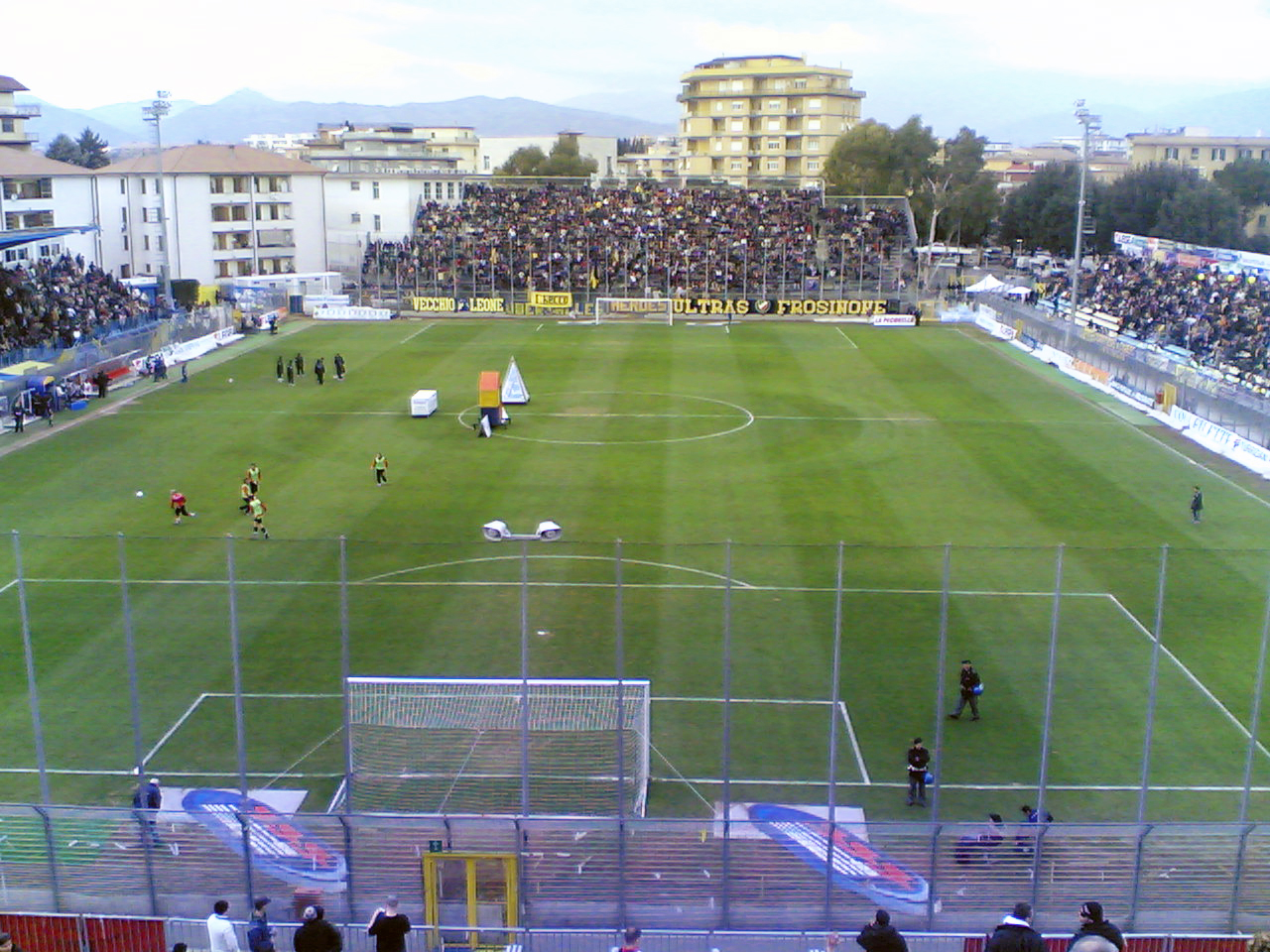
The Stadio Comunale Matusa

Frosinone has always played its home games at the Stadio Comunale di Frosinone, nicknamed the Matusa because of the age of the structure. Founded in what was then the outskirts of the city, today, as a result of the massive urban growth of the city, it is set in the centre of the capital of Frosinone surrounded by several buildings. It has undergone several reconstructions but never related to the foundational structure of the grandstand, which is still the one from the foundation.

Over the years, also depending on the results of the team, it has had different capacities. In 2014 it could accommodate approximately 10,000 spectators.

In the eighties the new Stadio Casaleno began to be built in short distance of the area. The progress, which led to the construction of a grandstand, however, was interrupted as a result of scandals and erroneous projects and led to the temporary decline of the team. For several years projects have been proposed to complete the structure and give Frosinone a new stadium, but the idea, as well as complex bureaucratic loopholes and economic issues, has also seen resistance from many fans who prefer to play in the old historic stadium.

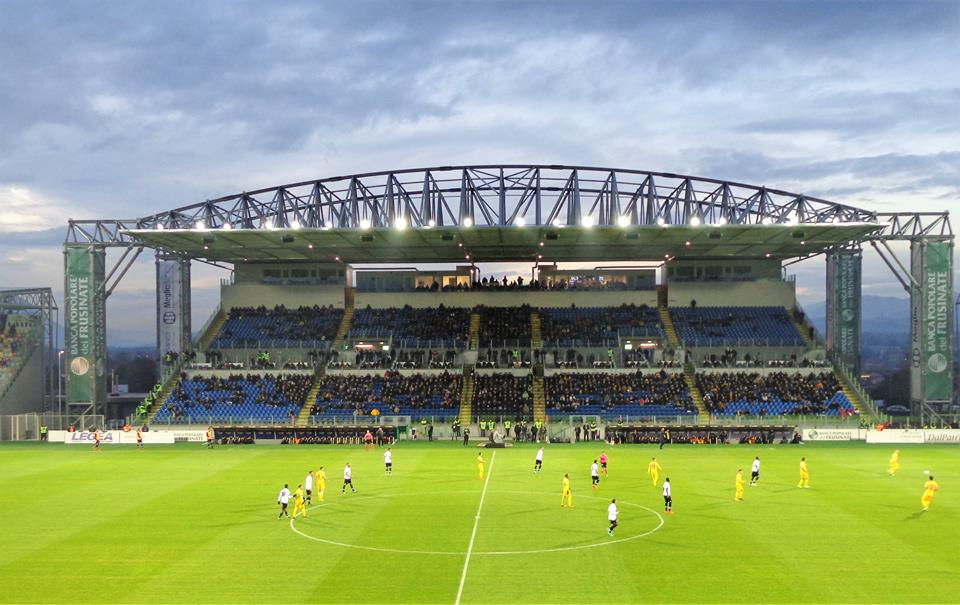
The Stadio Benito Stirpe

In 2007, to unlock the stalemate that concerned the management of the old Matusa and the construction of the new municipal stadium, some fans of the club, as a provocative gesture, put the stadium up for auction on eBay for a single euro, though in a few hours the bidding price was over €8 million.

The record of spectators in a game inside of the Matusa dates back to the Serie C1 championship of 1988–89, with about 12,000 spectators for a match against Campobasso.

Starting from October 2017, Frosinone plays its home games at Benito Stirpe stadium. The record number of spectators at a game inside of the Stirpe in Serie B championship of 2017–2018, was about 16,286 spectators for a match against Foggia.

In November 2017, Frosinone Calcio launched the first ever public mini-bond investment scheme in Italian football via sports investment platform Tifosy. Frosinone Calcio president Maurizio Stirpe mentions that the proceeds of the mini-bond would be used to:

"build the medical center (intended for all those who gravitate around the world of Frosinone Calcio) and the restaurant, both located in the belly of the central grandstand. With the resources that the club aims to collect through crowdfunding the ring around the stadium could also be restructured, with the rebuilding of the flooring, so as to allow citizens who use these spaces to run and train themselves to have a more functional space to these activities".

The Frosinone Bond raised €1,500,000 which was €500,000 over what the club initially thought the bond would raise.

== Honours ==
=== Domestic ===
==== League ====
- Serie B
  - Winners: 2022–23
- Serie C2
  - Winners (2): 1986–87 (group D), 2003–04 (group C)
- Serie D
  - Winners (2): 1965–66 (group D), 1970–71 (group F)

==== Regional ====
- Terza Divisione
  - Winners (1): 1932–33
- Seconda Divisione
  - Winners (2): 1933–34, 1945–46 (group E)
- Prima Categoria
  - Winners (1): 1962–63

==== Cups ====
- Coppa Italia Serie C
  - Runners-up (1): 2004–05

==== Youth ====
- Campionato Nazionale Dante Berretti
  - Winners (1): 2011–12
- Campionato Allievi Nazionali
  - Winners (1): 2011–12
- Supercoppa Allievi
  - Winners (1): 2011–12

== Club records ==
=== League ===
Below is a table showing the participation of Frosinone in the Italian leagues.

Level	Category	Participation	Debut	Final season	Total
1°	Serie A	3	2015–16	2023–24	3
2°	Serie B	13	2006–07	2024–25	13
3°	Prima Divisione	1	1934–35		14
3°	Serie C	6	1947–48	1974–75	14
3°	Serie C1	4	1987–88	2005–06	14
3°	Lega Pro Prima Divisione	3	2011–12	2013–14	14
4°	Promozione	4	1948–49	1951–52	37
4°	IV Serie	5	1952–53	1956–57	37
4°	Campionato Interregionale – 1ª Cat.	1	1957–58		37
4°	Campionato Interregionale	1	1958–59		37
4°	Serie D	10	1963–64	1977–78	37
4°	Serie C2	16	1978–79	2003–04	37
5°	Serie D	3	1979–80	2000–01	8
5°	Campionato Interregionale	2	1990–91	1991–92	8
5°	Campionato Nazionale Dilettanti	3	1992–93	1999–2000	8

=== Individual ===
Source: Frosinone Calcio official website

Record of appearances

- 287 (Italy) Marco Cari
- 272 (Italy) Giorgio Davato
- 250 (Italy) Gianni Gabriele
- 228 (Italy) Fabrizio Perrotti
- 205 (Italy) Pietro Del Sette
- 202 (Italy) Marco Bagaglini
- 198 (Italy) Raniero Pellegrini
- 186 (Italy) Daniel Ciofani
- 182 (Italy) Massimo Zappino
- 176 (Italy) Francesco Rosati
- 176 (Italy) Alessandro Frara
- 167 (Italy) Francesco Caputi
- 167 (Italy) Paolo Santarelli
- 164 (Italy) Alberto Recchia
- 157 (Italy) Massimo Assante
- 151 (Italy) Renato Lazzarini
- 148 (Italy) Egidio Fumagalli
- 147 (Italy) Vincenzo Catenacci
- 141 (Italy) Andrea Cano
- 140 (Italy) David D'Antoni
- 136 (Italy) Tonino Spaziani
- 135 (Italy) Giuliano Farinelli
- 134 (Italy) Antonio Bocchetti
- 131 (Italy) Angelo Brunello
- 129 (Italy) Massimo Pietrantoni
- 128 (Italy) Mario Lillo
- 128 (Italy) Paolo Russo
- 127 (Italy) Antonio Colagiovanni
- 127 (Italy) Arturo Massari
- 123 (Italy) Roberto Sesena
- 121 (Italy) Zeno Spaziani

Record of goals

- 68 (Italy) Daniel Ciofani
- 64 (Italy) Paolo Santarelli
- 50 (Italy) Federico Dionisi
- 43 (Italy) Francesco Caputi
- 38 (Italy) Francesco Lodi
- 36 (Italy) Paolo Russo
- 35 (Italy) Salvatore Silvestri
- 35 (Italy) Angelo Brunello
- 34 (Italy) Tonino Spaziani
- 33 (Italy) Giovanni Battista Benvenuto
- 31 (Italy) Gianni Testa
- 30 (Italy) Vincenzo Santoruvo
- 29 (Italy) Fabrizio Perrotti
- 29 (Italy) Azzoni
- 28 (Italy) Quercia
- 27 (Italy) Alfredo Orsini
- 26 (Italy) Giuliano Farinelli
- 26 (Italy) Davis Curiale
- 25 (Italy) Bruno Graziani
- 24 (Italy) Salvatore Mastronunzio
- 22 (Italy) Salvatore Campilongo
- 22 (Italy) Renato Lazzarini
- 22 (Italy) Danilo Neri
- 21 (Italy) Gianluca Daldin
- 20 (Italy) Luciano Gaudino
- 20 (Italy) Éder

=== Managers ===
Managers

- 1912–1947 ...
- 1947–1948 (Italy) Renato Tofani
- 1948–1949 (Argentina) Hugo Lamanna
- 1949–1952 ...
- 1952–1953 (Italy) Umberto De Angelis
- 1953–1954 (Italy) Antenore Marmiroli
- 1954–1955 (Italy) Carlo Sica
  (Italy) Paolo Jacobini
  (Italy) Umberto De Angelis
- 1955–1956 (Italy) Italo Breviglieri
  (Italy) Mario Genta
- 1956–1958 (Italy) Mario Genta
- 1958–1963 ...
- 1963–1964 (Italy) Renzo Merlin
  (Italy) Adriano Zecca
- 1964–1965 (Italy) Adriano Zecca
  (Italy) Umberto De Angelis
- 1965–1966 (Italy) Umberto De Angelis
- 1966–1967 (Italy) Umberto De Angelis
  (Italy) Amedeo Amadei
- 1967–1968 (Italy) Zeffiro Furiassi
  (Italy) Ivano Corghi
- 1968–1969 (Italy) Carlo Orlandi
- 1969–1970 (Italy) Umberto De Angelis
  (Italy) Carlo Orlandi
  (Italy) Gennaro Rambone
- 1970–1971 (Italy) Giuseppe Banchetti
- 1971–1972 (Italy) Luciano Lupi
  (Italy) Claudio Surina
- 1972–1973 (Italy) Feliciano Orazi
  (Italy) Umberto Mannocci
- 1973–1974 (Italy) Umberto Mannocci
- 1974–1975 (Italy) Enzo Benedetti
  (Italy) Amos Cardarelli
- 1975–1976 (Italy) Giuseppe Banchetti
  (Italy) Amos Mariani
- 1976–1977 (Italy) Orlando Di Nitto
  (Italy) Renato Piacentini
  (Italy) Virginio De Paoli
- 1977–1978 (Italy) Umberto Mannocci
- 1978–1979 (Italy) Adelmo Eufemi
  (Italy) Claudio Surina
  (Italy) Umberto Mannocci
- 1979–1980 (Italy) Giancarlo Grande
  (Italy) Orlando Di Nitto
  (Italy) Alberto Mari
- 1980–1982 (Italy) Alberto Mari
- 1982–1983 (Italy) Mario Facco
- 1983–1985 (Italy) Mario Santececca
- 1985–1986 (Italy) Umberto Mannocci
- 1986–1988 (Italy) Alberto Mari
- 1988–1989 (Italy) Alberto Mari
  (Italy) Enzo Robotti
- 1989–1990 (Italy) Rosario Rivellino
- 1990–1991 (Italy) Francesco Andreetti
  (Italy) Maurizio Simonato
- 1991–1992 (Italy) Giorgio Magnocavallo
  (Italy) Gianpiero Ceccarelli
  (Italy) Antonio Antonucci
- 1992–1993 (Italy) Gianfranco Tosoni
  (Italy) Giancarlo Di Carlo
  (Italy) Giancarlo Carloni
- 1993–1994 (Italy) Giancarlo Carloni
  (Italy) Luciano Vescovi
- 1994–1995 (Italy) Luciano Vescovi
- 1995–1996 (Italy) Alberto Mari
- 1996–1997 (Italy) Bruno Giordano
  (Italy) Carlo Ripari
- 1997–1998 (Italy) Roberto Sorrentino
- 1998–1999 (Italy) Claudio Di Pucchio
- 1999–2000 (Italy) Alberto Mari
  (Italy) Luigi Cipriani
- 2000–2001 (Italy) Stefano Sanderra
- 2001–2002 (Italy) Stefano Sanderra
  (Italy) Ignazio Arcoleo
- 2002–2003 (Italy) Leonardo Bitetto
  (Italy) Giovanni Pagliari
- 2003–2004 (Italy) Daniele Arrigoni
  (Italy) Francesco Giorgini
- 2004–2005 (Italy) Dino Pagliari
- 2005–2007 (Italy) Ivo Iaconi
- 2007–2008 (Italy) Alberto Cavasin
- 2008–2009 (Italy) Piero Braglia
- 2009–2010 (Italy) Francesco Moriero
  (Italy) Guido Carboni
- 2010–2011 (Italy) Guido Carboni
  (Italy) Salvatore Campilongo
- 2011–2012 (Italy) Carlo Sabatini
  (Italy) Eugenio Corini
- 2012–2016 (Italy) Roberto Stellone
- 2016–2017 (Italy) Pasquale Marino
- 2017–2018 (Italy) Moreno Longo
- 2018–2019 (Italy) Marco Baroni
- 2019–2021 (Italy) Alessandro Nesta
- 2021–2023 (Italy) Fabio Grosso

== Bibliography ==
- Aversa Estella, Le porte della storia, la grande avventura del Frosinone Calcio, Eraclea, Roma, 2007.
- Di Sora Amedeo, C'era una volta un pallone... La storia del calcio frusinate dai primi anni del Novecento ad oggi raccontata da un cronista da stadio, Editrice Frusinate, 2004.
- Lisi Luca e Rotondo Federico, Immagini Emozioni... Un anno storico, Modulgraf srl, Pomezia, 2007.
- Renna Piergiorgio, Storia del Frosinone Calcio, Edizioni Multimedia, Frosinone, 1994.
- Renna Piergiorgio, La Quarta serie negli anni '50, Edizioni Multimedia, Frosinone, 2007.
- Renna Piergiorgio, Frosinone 1906/2006 – Serie B come Bellator, Edizioni Multimedia, Frosinone, 2007.
- Vigliani Alessandro, "Sembra Impossibile, il romanzo sui tifosi del Frosinone Calcio", Pulp Edizioni, Frosinone 2010.
