= Mario Genta =

Italian footballer

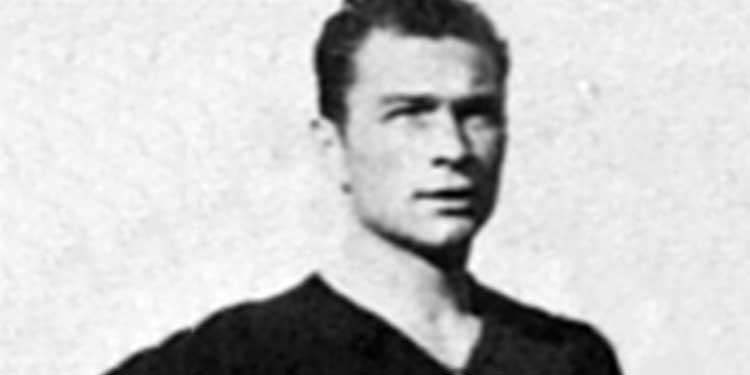

Personal information
- Full name: Mario Genta
- Date of birth: 1 March 1912
- Place of birth: Turin, Kingdom of Italy
- Date of death: 9 January 1993 (aged 80)
- Place of death: Genoa, Italy
- Position: Midfielder

Senior career*
Years	Team	Apps	(Gls)
1932-1934	Juventus	1	(0)
1934-1935	Pavia	17	(0)
1935-1946	Genoa	222	(7)
1946-1950	Prato	108	(2)
1950-1951	Entella	23	(0)

International career
1938–1939	Italy	2	(0)

Managerial career
- 1946-1947: Prato
- 1950-1951: Entella
- 1954-1955: Siena
- 1956-1958: Frosinone
- 1958-1959: Entella
- 1961-1963: Parma
- 1963-1964: Modena
- 1964-1965: Sestri Levante
- 1965-1967: Massese
- 1967-1969: Entella
- 1969-1970: Carrarese
- 1970-1971: Torres
- 1971-1973: Grosseto
- 1973-1974: Entella
Medal record
Italy
FIFA World Cup
Gold medal – first place	1938 France
- * Club domestic league appearances and goals

Mario Genta (Italian pronunciation: [ˈmaːrjo ˈdʒɛnta]; 1 March 1912 – 9 January 1993) was an Italian footballer who played as a midfielder.

== Club career ==
Born in Turin, Genta played club football in the 1930s for Italian sides Juventus, Prato, and Genoa. He played 223 matches in Serie A and scored 6 goals.

== International career ==
With the Italy national team, Genta was selected to the 1938 FIFA World Cup champion squad as a reserve player. He lateron earned 2 caps in 1939.

== Honours ==
=== Club ===
Juventus

- Serie A: 1932–33

Genoa

- Coppa Italia: 1936–37

Prato

- Serie C: 1948–49

=== International ===
Italy

- FIFA World Cup: 1938
