= Masiello =

Masiello is a surname originating in Italy. Notable people with the surname include:

- Andrea Masiello (born 1986), Italian soccer player
- Anthony Masiello, Buffalo, New York, politician
- Caroline A. Masiello, American biogeochemist
- Luciano Masiello (born 1952), Italian-born English and Irish soccer player
- Salvatore Masiello (born 1982), Italian soccer player
- Wendy M. Masiello, United States Air Force officer
