= Caroline A. Masiello =

American biogeochemist

- Awards: Geological Society of America Fellow

Academic background
- Education: University of California, Irvine (M.S., Ph.D.)
- Thesis: Radiocarbon measurements of black carbon in sediments and a small river (1999)

Academic work
- Discipline: Biogeochemistry
- Institutions: Rice University
- Website: https://www.masiellolab.org/

Caroline Masiello is a biogeochemist who develops tools to better understand the cycling and fate of globally relevant elemental cycles. She is a professor at Rice University in the Department of Earth, Environmental and Planetary Sciences and holds joint appointments in the Chemistry and Biochemistry Departments. Masiello was elected as a Fellow of the Geological Society of America in 2017. She currently leads an interdisciplinary team of scientists who are developing microbial sensors for earth system science.

== Early life and education ==
Masiello moved several times as a child, attending high school in Indiana, Pennsylvania. Here she attended the Pennsylvania's Governor's School for Sciences. She majored in Physics and Math at Earlham College, and graduated with honors in 1991. She went onto earn a Master of Science in Environmental Sciences from the University of North Carolina at Chapel Hill in 1993 and a Master of Science in Physical Chemistry from the University of California, Irvine in 1996. While at UC-Irvine Masiello worked with Ellen R.M. Druffel, developing biogeochemical tools to examine carbon pools. Her thesis, Radiocarbon measurements of black carbon in sediments of a small river, examined the temporal shifts of the particulate and dissolved carbon exported from the Santa Clara River, CA. using Δ^{14}C, earning her a Ph.D. in Earth System Science from UC-Irvine in 1999.

== Career and research ==
After her graduate studies, Masiello worked as a Postdoctoral Scholar at the Center for Accelerator Mass Spectrometry, Lawrence Livermore National Laboratory (1999-2002) and with the Geography Department at the University of California, Santa Barbara (2002-2004). She was appointed to the faculty at Rice University in 2004 where she serves as a member of the Department of Earth, Environmental and Planetary Sciences.

Masiello's research focuses on developing tools that allow her to understand how elements are cycling around the planet, this includes tools that track how cells communicate to one another (e.g.) to others that allow us to follow organic carbon pools from the atmosphere to mountain slopes to the ocean (eg.). In particular, her group focuses on how carbon is stored, transformed, and transported in and through soils, rivers, and oceans; thus it has contributed to basic and applied research in the fields of organic geochemistry and biogeochemistry. In particular her work has advanced our knowledge of black carbon (and biochar) within both aquatic and terrestrial environments (e.g.). For her “outstanding contributions into understanding the role of organic carbon in soils across Earth’s surface, which impacts a wide range of geoscience and other fields, such as agriculture and climate change” she was recognized as a Fellow by the Geological Society of America in 2017.

Masiello currently leads a team of scientists, including biochemist Jonathan Silberg and microbiologist Matthew Bennett, working to develop microbial biosensors that will help us improve our ability to manage our landscape to preserve and promote ecosystem services such as carbon sequestration and nitrate removal by alerting us to key biogeochemical processes.

Masiello's work has garnered support from a number of funding sources, including the National Science Foundation, U.S. Department of Energy, W.M. Keck Foundation, and more (e.g.).

=== Awards ===
- 2022 UCI Physical Sciences Alumni Hall of Fame
- 2017 Fellow Geological Society of America
- 2002-2003 American Fellow, American Association of University Women

=== Outreach ===
Masiello merges her research with teaching and outreach. Her lab hosts K-12 teachers from local Houston schools, working collaboratively with them, to develop earth science curricular materials.
