= Adriano Zecca =

Italian footballer and manager (1923-1983)

Personal information
- Date of birth: April 11, 1923
- Place of birth: Genoa, Italy
- Date of death: 14 March 1983
- Height: 1.74 m (5 ft 8 1/2 in)
- Position: Midfielder

Senior career*
Years	Team	Apps	(Gls)
1941–1942	Sanremese		
1942–1943	Reggiana	18	(14)
1943–1944	Luguria	3	(0)
1945–1946	Torino	2	(0)
1946–1947	Modena	36	(6)
1947–1949	Venezia	72	(38)
1949–1953	Roma	91	(23)
1953–1954	Verona	27	(8)
1954–1955	Bari	23	(6)
1955–1957	Foligno		

Managerial career
- 1958–1960: Vis Pesaro
- 1968–1969: Spezia
- 1971–1972: Viterbese
- * Club domestic league appearances and goals

Adriano Zecca (11 April 1923 – 14 March 1983) was an Italian professional football player and coach.

He was born in Genoa and played for four seasons (100 matches, 19 goals) in the Serie A for Modena F.C. and A.S. Roma.

== Honours ==
- Italian Champion: 1945/46 (not officially considered a Serie A season)
