= 2025–26 Palermo FC season =

Palermo
2025–26 season
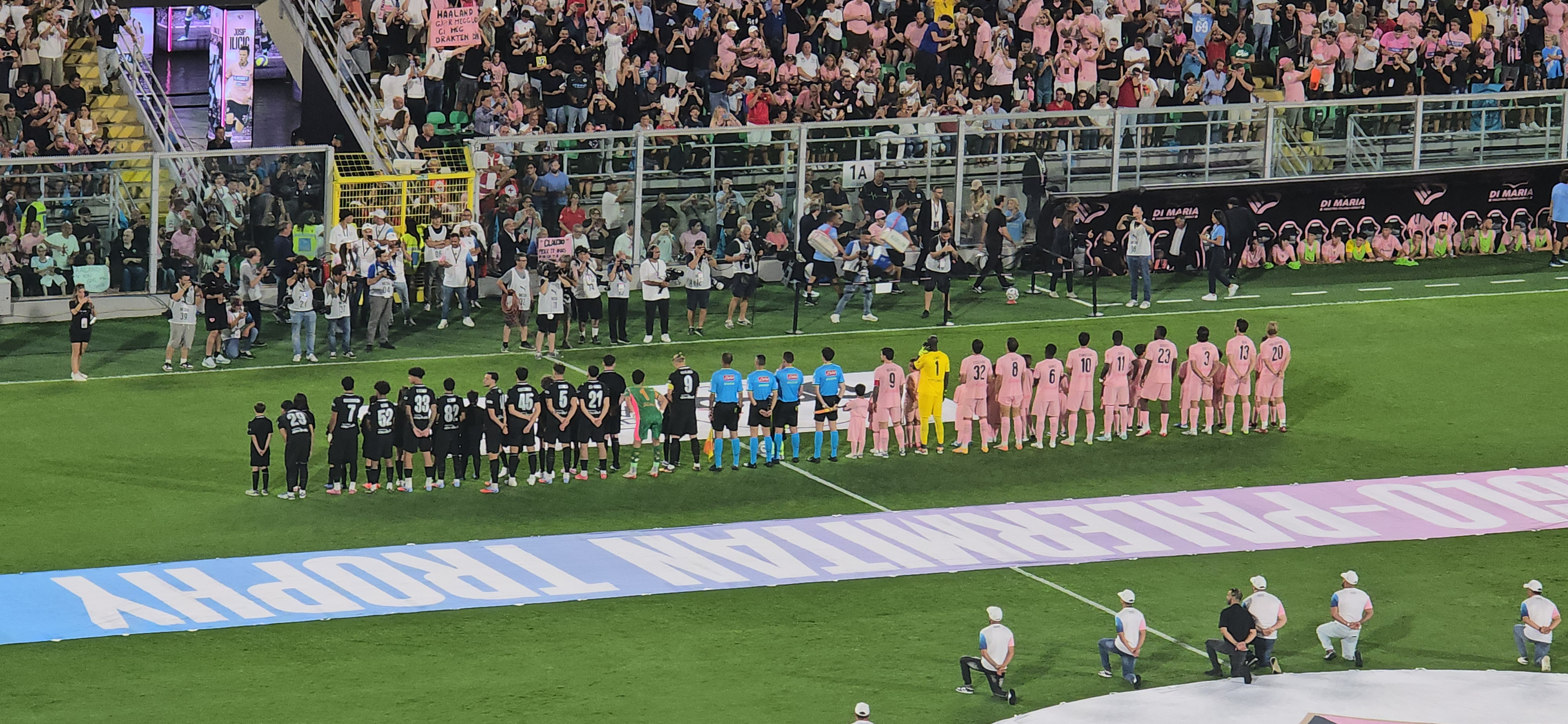
- Manchester City and Palermo players lining up before an exhibition match, 9 August 2025
- Owner: City Football Group (94,94%); Hera Hora S.r.l. (5%); Associazione Amici Rosanero (0,06%)
- Chairman: Dario Mirri
- Manager: Filippo Inzaghi
- Stadium: Renzo Barbera
- Serie B: 4th
- Serie B promotion play-offs: Semi-finals
- Coppa Italia: Second round
- Top goalscorer: League: Joel Pohjanpalo (24); All: Joel Pohjanpalo (25)
- Highest home attendance: 32,922 (v Modena)
- Average home league attendance: 27,822
- Biggest win: 5–0 (v Carrarese)
Home colours	Away colours	Third colours

The 2025–26 season was the 97th in the history of Palermo FC and their fourth season in a row in the second division. The club participated in Serie B and Coppa Italia.

== Players ==
=== First team squad ===
As of 22 August 2025

Note: Flags indicate national team as defined under FIFA eligibility rules; some limited exceptions apply. Players may hold more than one non-FIFA nationality.

No.	Pos.	Nation	Player
1	GK	SEN	Alfred Gomis
3	DF	ITA	Tommaso Augello
5	MF	ITA	Antonio Palumbo
6	MF	FRA	Claudio Gomes
7	FW	ITA	Federico Di Francesco
8	MF	ITA	Jacopo Segre
9	FW	ITA	Matteo Brunori (Captain)
10	MF	ITA	Filippo Ranocchia
11	FW	GHA	Emanuel Gyasi
13	DF	ITA	Mattia Bani
14	MF	SRB	Aljosa Vasic
15	DF	ITA	Ettore Karol Nicolosi
18	DF	ITA	Pietro Avena
20	FW	FIN	Joel Pohjanpalo
21	FW	FRA	Jérémy Le Douaron

No.	Pos.	Nation	Player
22	GK	ITA	Francesco Bardi
23	DF	FRA	Salim Diakité
24	DF	ITA	Giangiacomo Magnani
27	DF	ITA	Niccolò Pierozzi
28	MF	FRA	Alexis Blin
29	DF	POL	Patryk Peda
31	FW	ITA	Giacomo Corona
32	DF	ITA	Pietro Ceccaroni
63	GK	ITA	Francesco Cutrona
66	GK	FIN	Jesse Joronen
72	DF	ITA	Davide Veroli
77	GK	ITA	Francesco Di Bartolo
80	MF	ITA	Salvatore Squillacioti
86	MF	ITA	Valerio Brutto

=== Other players ===
Note: Flags indicate national team as defined under FIFA eligibility rules; some limited exceptions apply. Players may hold more than one non-FIFA nationality.

No.	Pos.	Nation	Player
—	MF	BIH	Dario Šarić
—	MF	ITA	Valerio Verre

== Transfers ==
=== Summer ===
In
Date	Pos.	Name	From	Type	Fee	Ref.
1 July 2025	GK	(Italy) Manfredi Nespola	(Italy) Flaminia	End of loan	Free	
1 July 2025	DF	(Poland) Patryk Peda	(Italy) Juve Stabia	End of loan	Free	
1 July 2025	MF	(Bosnia and Herzegovina) Dario Šarić	(Italy) Cesena	End of loan	Free	
1 July 2025	FW	(France) Stredair Appuah	(France) Valenciennes	End of loan	Free	
1 July 2025	FW	(Italy) Giacomo Corona	(Italy) Pontedera	End of loan	Free	
8 July 2025	DF	(Italy) Tommaso Augello	Unattached (Note: Previous club: Cagliari.)	Permanent deal	Free	
16 July 2025	FW	(Ghana) Emanuel Gyasi	(Italy) Empoli	Loan with an obligation to buy	Free	
23 July 2025	MF	(Italy) Antonio Palumbo	(Italy) Modena	Permanent deal	€2.3M	
27 July 2025	DF	(Italy) Mattia Bani	(Italy) Genoa	Permanent deal	€1.5M	
8 August 2025	GK	(Italy) Francesco Bardi	Unattached (Note: Previous club: Reggiana.)	Permanent deal	Free	
21 August 2025	GK	(Finland) Jesse Joronen	Unattached (Note: Previous club: Venezia.)	Permanent deal	Free	
22 August 2025	DF	(Italy) Davide Veroli	(Italy) Cagliari	Loan with an option to buy and a conditional obligation	Free	
Out
Date	Pos.	Name	To	Type	Fee	Ref.
23 May 2025	DF	(Denmark) Simon Graves Jensen	(Netherlands) PEC Zwolle	Option to buy exercised	€0.5M	
23 June 2025	DF	(Italy) Giuseppe Aurelio	(Italy) Spezia	Option to buy exercised	€0.4M	
1 July 2025	MF	(Italy) Samuele Damiani	(Italy) Ternana	Option to buy exercised	€0.2M	
1 July 2025	FW	(Italy) Giuseppe Fella	(Italy) Cavese	Option to buy exercised	Undisclosed	
1 July 2025	GK	(Indonesia) Emil Audero	(Italy) Como	End loan	Free	
1 July 2025	DF	(Turkey) Rayyan Baniya	(Turkey) Trabzonspor	End loan	Free	
1 July 2025	FW	(France) Thomas Henry	(Italy) Hellas Verona	End loan	Free	
1 July 2025	GK	(Italy) Salvatore Sirigu	Unattached	Contract expired	Free	
3 July 2025	FW	(France) Stredair Appuah	(France) Valenciennes	Loan	Free	
16 July 2025	GK	(Italy) Manfredi Nespola	(Italy) Arzignano Valchiampo	Loan	Free	
18 July 2025	DF	(Greece) Dimitrios Nikolaou	(Italy) Bari	Loan	Free	
23 July 2025	FW	(Italy) Francesco Di Mariano	(Italy) Modena	Permanent deal	€0.43M	
24 July 2025	FW	(Italy) Roberto Insigne	(Italy) Avellino	Permanent deal	Undisclosed	
5 August 2025	DF	(United States) Kristoffer Lund	(Germany) FC Köln	Loan with an option to buy	Free	
8 August 2025	GK	(Italy) Sebastiano Desplanches	(Italy) Pescara	Loan	Free	
21 August 2025	DF	(Italy) Alessio Buttaro	(Italy) Foggia	Loan	Free	

== Pre-season and friendlies ==
Win Draw Loss Fixtures

17 July 2025 Friendly	Palermo	9–0	(Italy) Aosta Valley amateur local team	Châtillon
17:30 CEST (UTC+2)	Le Douaron 46', 63', 65', 80'; Augello 50'; Corona 61', 72', 85', 88'	Report		Stadium: Ernesto Brunod

20 July 2025 Friendly	Palermo	5–1	(Switzerland) Paradiso	Châtillon
17:30 CEST (UTC+2)	Ceccaroni 6'; Le Douaron 47'; Di Francesco 63'; Corona 72'; Brunori 90'	Report	Rasic 59'	Stadium: Ernesto Brunod

24 July 2025 Friendly	Palermo	4–0	(Italy) Nuova Sondrio	Châtillon
18:00 CEST (UTC+2)	Pierozzi 2'; Brunori 34'; Ceccaroni 43'; Corona 78'	Report		Stadium: Ernesto Brunod

27 July 2025 Friendly	Palermo	1–0	(Italy) Bra	Châtillon
17:30 CEST (UTC+2)	Di Francesco 35'	Report		Stadium: Ernesto Brunod

30 July 2025 Friendly	Palermo	3–2	(France) Annecy	Châtillon
17:30 CEST (UTC+2)	Pohjanpalo 4'; Segre 22'; Le Douaron 88'	Report	Raache 59'; Neelakandan 77'	Stadium: Ernesto Brunod

6 August 2025 Friendly	Palermo	7–1	(Italy) Athletic Club Palermo	Torretta
18:00 CEST (UTC+2)	Segre; Palumbo; Pohjanpalo; Augello; Brutto; Diakité	Report	Sanchez	Stadium: Palermo City Football Academy

9 August 2025 Anglo Palermitan Trophy	Palermo	0–3	(England) Manchester City	Palermo
21:00 CEST	Augello (yellow card) 30'; Gyasi (yellow card) 68'	Report	Haaland 25'; Reijnders 59', 82'	Stadium: Stadio Renzo Barbera; Attendance: 34,665; Referee: (Italy) Rosario Abisso

== Competitions ==
=== Overall record ===
Competition	First match	Last match	Starting round	Final position	Record							
Competition	First match	Last match	Starting round	Final position	Pld	W	D	L	GF	GA	GD	Win %
Serie B	23 August 2025	9 May 2026	Matchday 1	In progress	1	1	0	0	2	1	+1	100.00
Coppa Italia	16 August 2025	24 September 2025	First round	Second round	1	0	1	0	0	0	+0	0.00
Total					2	1	1	0	2	1	+1	50.00

Last updated: 23 August 2025
Source: Palermo F.C.

=== Serie B ===
==== League table ====
Pos	Team	Pld	W	D	L	GF	GA	GD	Pts	Promotion, qualification or relegation
2	Frosinone (P)	38	23	12	3	76	34	+42	81	Promotion to Serie A
3	Monza (O, P)	38	22	10	6	61	32	+29	76	Qualification for promotion play-offs semi-finals
4	Palermo	38	20	12	6	61	33	+28	72	Qualification for promotion play-offs semi-finals
5	Catanzaro	38	15	14	9	62	51	+11	59	Qualification for promotion play-offs preliminary round
6	Modena	38	15	10	13	49	36	+13	55	Qualification for promotion play-offs preliminary round

Source: Serie BKT
Rules for classification: 1) Points; 2) Head-to-head points; 3) Head-to-head goal difference; 4) Goal difference; 5) Goals scored; 6) Draw.
(Note: Head-to-head record is used only after all the matches between the teams in question have been played)
(O) Play-off winners; (P) Promoted

==== Results summary ====
Overall								Home						Away					
Pld	W	D	L	GF	GA	GD	Pts	W	D	L	GF	GA	GD	W	D	L	GF	GA	GD
38	20	12	6	61	33	+28	72	14	4	1	38	12	+26	6	8	5	23	21	+2

Last updated: 8 May 2026.
Source: Soccerway

==== Results by round ====
Round	1	2	3	4	5	6	7	8	9	10	11	12	13	14	15	16	17	18	19	20	21	22	23	24	25	26	27	28	29	30	31	32	33	34	35	36	37	38
Ground	H	H	A	H	A	H	A	H	A	H	H	A	A	H	A	H	A	H	A	H	A	A	H	A	H	H	A	H	A	A	H	A	H	A	H	A	H	A
Result	W	D	W	W	D	D	W	D	L	L	W	L	D	W	W																							
Position	6	7	3	2	3	3	2	2	4	6	5	6	6	6	5																							

Updated to match(es) played on 7 December 2025. Source: WorldFootball.net
A = Away; H = Home; W = Win; D = Draw; L = Loss

Note

In order to preserve chronological evolvements, any postponed matches are not included to the round at which they were originally scheduled, but added to the full round they were played immediately afterwards.

==== Matches ====
23 August 2025 1	Palermo	2–1	Reggiana	Palermo
20:00 CEST (UTC+2)	Diakité (yellow card) 30'; Pohjanpalo 38'; Pierozzi 64'	Report	Papetti (yellow card) 52'; Tavşan 62'	Stadium: Stadio Renzo Barbera; Attendance: 30,868; Referee: Ivano Pezzuto

30 August 2025 2	Palermo	0–0	Frosinone	Palermo
20:00 CEST (UTC+2)	Bani (yellow card) 90+5'	Report	Calò (yellow card) 30'; Gelli (yellow card) 75'; Bracaglia (yellow card) 76'	Stadium: Stadio Renzo Barbera; Attendance: 32,181; Referee: Marco Di Bello

14 September 2025 3	Südtirol	0–2	Palermo	Bolzano
16:15 CEST (UTC+2)	Mallamo (yellow card) 75'; Martini (yellow card) 88'	Report	Pohjanpalo 2', 80'; Bani (yellow card) 21'; Peda (yellow card) 47'; Augello (yellow card) 69'	Stadium: Stadio Druso; Attendance: 4,707; Referee: Federico La Penna

19 September 2025 4	Palermo	2–0	Bari	Palermo
20:00 CEST (UTC+2)	Le Douaron 76'; Gomes 90+2'	Report	Darboe (yellow card) 28'; Verreth (yellow card) 81'; Nikolaou (yellow card) 90+5'	Stadium: Stadio Renzo Barbera; Attendance: 32,363; Referee: Daniele Perenzoni

27 September 2025 5	Cesena	1–1	Palermo	Cesena
14:00 CEST (UTC+2)	Zaro (yellow card) 13'; Blesa 34'; Castagnetti (yellow card) 57'	Report	Bani 56'; Blin (yellow card) 68'	Stadium: Stadio Dino Manuzzi; Attendance: 14,423; Referee: Davide Massa

30 September 2025 6	Palermo	0–0	Venezia	Palermo
19:30 CEST (UTC+2)	Pierozzi (yellow card) 15'; Augello (yellow card) 31'; Bani (yellow card) 37'; Ceccaroni (yellow card) 49' (red card) 90+2'	Report	Doumbia (yellow card) 33'; Busio (yellow card) 86'	Stadium: Stadio Renzo Barbera; Attendance: 31,933; Referee: Livio Marinelli

4 October 2025 7	Spezia	1–2	Palermo	La Spezia
16:15 CEST (UTC+2)	Matějů (yellow card) 29'; Giovane 89' (o.g.)	Report	Diakité (yellow card) 33'; Pohjanpalo 42'; Pierozzi 58'; Blin (yellow card) 66'; Veroli (yellow card) 73'	Stadium: Stadio Alberto Picco; Attendance: 9,392; Referee: Matteo Marcenaro

19 October 2025 8	Palermo	1–1	Modena	Palermo
15:00 CEST (UTC+2)	Segre (yellow card) 18', (goal) 32'	Report	Gerli (yellow card) 17'; Bereszyński 76' (o.g.)	Stadium: Stadio Renzo Barbera; Attendance: 32,922; Referee: Daniele Chiffi

25 October 2025 9	Catanzaro	1–0	Palermo	Catanzaro
18:30 CEST (UTC+2)	Petriccione (yellow card) 15'; Pontisso (yellow card) 39'; Cissè 45+2'; Iemmello (yellow card) 50'	Report	Pierozzi (yellow card) 8'; Peda (yellow card) 74'; Palumbo (yellow card) 90+2'	Stadium: Stadio Nicola Ceravolo; Attendance: 8,400; Referee: Luca Pairetto

28 October 2025 10	Palermo	0–3	Monza	Palermo
20:30 CET	Brunori (yellow card) 74'	Report	Baldé (yellow card) 30'; Mota 39'; Izzo 50', (yellow card) 74'; Birindelli (yellow card) 82'; Ravanelli (yellow card) 90+4'; Azzi 90+5'	Stadium: Stadio Renzo Barbera; Attendance: 26,679; Referee: Juan Luca Sacchi

1 November 2025 11	Palermo	5–0	Pescara	Palermo
19:30 CET (UTC+1)	Pierozzi 23', 58'; Segre 46'; Bereszyński (yellow card) 71'; Brunori 72', (yellow card) 73'; Vasić (yellow card) 80'; Diakité 83'	Report	Brandes (yellow card) 32'; Dagasso (yellow card) 75'	Stadium: Stadio Renzo Barbera; Attendance: 27,077; Referee: Andrea Zanotti

8 November 2025 12	Juve Stabia	1–0	Palermo	Castellammare di Stabia
17:15 CET (UTC+1)	Cacciamani 38'; Candellone (yellow card) 87'	Report	Palumbo (yellow card) 20'; Brunori (yellow card) 31'; Augello (yellow card) 72'; Pierozzi (yellow card) 73'; Ranocchia (yellow card) 84' (red card) 90'; Corona (yellow card) 90+5'	Stadium: Stadio Romeo Menti; Attendance: 3,893; Referee: Matteo Marchetti

22 November 2025 13	Virtus Entella	1–1	Palermo	Chiavari
15:00 CET (UTC+1)	Tiritiello 44'; Vecchia (yellow card) 78'	Report	Bani (yellow card) 47'; Pohjanpalo 58'	Stadium: Stadio Enrico Sannazzari; Attendance: 3,351; Referee: Giuseppe Collu

29 November 2025 14	Palermo	5–0	Carrarese	Palermo
19:30 CET (UTC+1)	Segre 24'; Palumbo (yellow card) 30', (goal) 44'; Pohjanpalo 48', 82' (pen.), 88'; Vasić (yellow card) 72'	Report	Illanes (yellow card) 40'; Finotto (yellow card) 78'; Calabrese (yellow card) 80'	Stadium: Stadio Renzo Barbera; Attendance: 21,834; Referee: Mario Perri

7 December 2025 15	Empoli	1–3	Palermo	Empoli
17:15 CET (UTC+1)	Pellegri (yellow card) 61', (goal) 63'; Moruzzi (yellow card) 90'	Report	Le Douaron 7'; Segre (yellow card) 14'; Pohjanpalo 18', 74'; Bereszyński (yellow card) 33'	Stadium: Stadio Carlo Castellani; Attendance: 7,857; Referee: Federico Dionisi

12 December 2025 16	Palermo	1–0	Sampdoria	Palermo
20:30 CET (UTC+1)	Le Douaron 29'	Report		Stadium: Stadio Renzo Barbera; Attendance: 25,512; Referee: Ivano Pezzuto

20 December 2025 17	Avellino	2–2	Palermo	Avellino
17:15 CET (UTC+1)	Biasci 39'; Palmiero (yellow card) 56'; Šimić (yellow card) 61'; Palumbo (yellow card) 76', (goal) 89'; Fontanarosa (yellow card) 82'	Report	Bani (yellow card) 18'; Ranocchia 69'; Diakité (yellow card) 75' (red card); Pohjanpalo 83' (pen.); Gomes (yellow card) 90+3'	Stadium: Stadio Partenio-Adriano Lombardi; Attendance: 9,500; Referee: Simone Galipò

27 December 2025 18	Palermo	1–0	Padova	Palermo
17:15 CET (UTC+1)	Le Douaron (yellow card) 33'; Pohjanpalo 38'; Palumbo (yellow card) 42'	Report	Harder (yellow card) 71'; Fusi (yellow card) 90+3'	Stadium: Stadio Renzo Barbera; Attendance: 32,506; Referee: Marco Piccinini

11 January 2026 19	Mantova	1–1	Palermo	Mantua
15:00 CET (UTC+1)	Trimboli (yellow card) 53'; C. Bani (yellow card) 83'; Castellini (yellow card) 90+3'; Marras 90+5'	Report	Ceccaroni 8'; Ranocchia (yellow card) 37'; Joronen (yellow card) 78'	Stadium: Stadio Danilo Martelli; Attendance: 8,549; Referee: Daniele Perenzoni

18 January 2026 20	Palermo	1–0	Spezia	Palermo
17:15 CET (UTC+1)	Segre 1'; Gyasi (yellow card) 40'; Bereszyński (yellow card) 54'	Report	Matějů (yellow card) 17'; Sernicola (yellow card) 49'; Soleri (yellow card) 59'	Stadium: Stadio Renzo Barbera; Attendance: 24,745; Referee: Luca Massimi

24 January 2026 21	Modena	0–0	Palermo	Modena
17:15 CET (UTC+1)	Nador (yellow card) 84'	Report	Gyasi (yellow card) 76'	Stadium: Stadio Alberto Braglia; Attendance: 13,803; Referee: Federico Dionisi

30 January 2026 22	Bari	0–3	Palermo	Bari
20:30 CET (UTC+1)	Pucino (yellow card) 26'; Stabile (yellow card) 32'; Dickmann (yellow card) 65'	Report	Palumbo (yellow card) 38'; Le Douaron 57', (yellow card) 65'; Pohjanpalo 67'; Pierozzi (yellow card) 71'; Ranocchia 82' (pen.); Bereszyński (yellow card) 88'	Stadium: Stadio San Nicola; Attendance: 10,636; Referee: Antonio Rapuano

7 February 2026 23	Palermo	3–2	Empoli	Palermo
17:15 CET (UTC+1)	Fulignati 24' (o.g.); Bani (yellow card) 33'; Ceccaroni (yellow card) 45'; Pohjanpalo 57', 84' (pen.)	Report	Guarino 5'; Lovato (yellow card) 38'; Obretin (yellow card) 66'; Ebuehi 72'; Fulignati (yellow card) 90+6'; Magnino (yellow card) 90+7'	Stadium: Stadio Renzo Barbera; Attendance: 24,975; Referee: Paride Tremolada

10 February 2026 24	Sampdoria	3–3	Palermo	Genoa
19:00 CET (UTC+1)	Begić 50', (yellow card) 59'; Pierini 53'; Cherubini 68', (yellow card) 69'; Barák (yellow card) 80'	Report	Bani (yellow card) 1'; Gomes (yellow card) 40'; Abildgaard 45+2' (o.g.); Ranocchia (yellow card) 71'; Le Douaron (yellow card) 77'; Augello 78'; Ceccaroni 90+2'	Stadium: Stadio Luigi Ferraris; Attendance: 22,768; Referee: Davide Di Marco

14 February 2026 25	Palermo	3–0	Virtus Entella	Palermo
15:00 CET (UTC+1)	Pohjanpalo 4'; Ranocchia 41'; Pierozzi 50'	Report		Stadium: Stadio Renzo Barbera; Attendance: 22,523; Referee: Ivano Pezzuto

21 February 2026 26	Palermo	3–0	Südtirol	Palermo
15:00 CET (UTC+1)	Pohjanpalo 21' (pen.); Le Douaron 38'; Ceccaroni 52'	Report	Frigerio (yellow card) 54'; Tonin (yellow card) 90+3'	Stadium: Stadio Renzo Barbera; Attendance: 24,915; Referee: Valerio Crezzini

1 March 2026 27	Pescara	2–1	Palermo	Pescara
15:00 CET (UTC+1)	Acampora (yellow card) 50'; Insigne 55'; Meazzi 87'; Bettella (yellow card) 89'; Di Nardo (yellow card) 90'; Brugman (yellow card) 90+2'	Report	Peda (yellow card) 45'; Pohjanpalo 47'; Ranocchia (yellow card) 52'	Stadium: Stadio Adriatico-Giovanni Cornacchia; Attendance: 6,478; Referee: Fabio Maresca

4 March 2026 28	Palermo	2–1	Mantova	Palermo
20:00 CET (UTC+1)	Ranocchia 2', (yellow card) 19'; Pohjanpalo 38'; Pierozzi (yellow card) 75'; Peda (yellow card) 81'; Gyasi (yellow card) 90+2'	Report	Zuccon (yellow card) 17' (red card) 32'	Stadium: Stadio Renzo Barbera; Attendance: 25,849; Referee: Giovanni Ayroldi

8 March 2026 29	Carrarese	0–1	Palermo	Carrara
17:15 CET (UTC+1)	Torregrossa (yellow card) 44'; Finotto (yellow card) 90'	Report	Pohjanpalo 19'; Bani (yellow card) 90'	Stadium: Stadio dei Marmi; Attendance: 4,976; Referee: Marco Piccinini

14 March 2026 30	Monza	3–0	Palermo	Monza
17:15 CET (UTC+1)	Petagna 18'; Hernani (yellow card) 41'; Ciurria 63'; Ravanelli (yellow card) 75'; Colombo 88'	Report	Palumbo (yellow card) 28'; Ceccaroni (yellow card) 62'; Modesto (yellow card) 77'; Ranocchia (yellow card) 80'	Stadium: Stadio Brianteo; Attendance: 11,766; Referee: Daniele Doveri

17 March 2026 31	Palermo	2–2	Juve Stabia	Palermo
19:00 CET (UTC+1)	Joronen (yellow card) 9'; Pohjanpalo 60' (pen.); Bani 65', (yellow card) 71'; Modesto (yellow card) 76'; Magnani (yellow card) 87'	Report	Leone 11' (pen.); Torrasi (yellow card) 44'; Giorgini (yellow card) 56'; Confente (yellow card) 60'; Varnier (yellow card) 63'; Mosti 73'; Kassama (yellow card) 90+6'	Stadium: Stadio Renzo Barbera; Attendance: 23,733; Referee: Federico Dionisi

21 March 2026 32	Padova	0–1	Palermo	Padua
15:00 CET (UTC+1)	Di Mariano (yellow card) 59'; Pastina (yellow card) 90' (red card) 90+6'	Report	Modesto (red card) 25'; Ceccaroni (yellow card) 48'; Bani 90+2'	Stadium: Stadio Euganeo; Attendance: 8,372; Referee: Livio Marinelli

5 April 2026 33	Palermo	2–0	Avellino	Palermo
18:30 CEST (UTC+2)	Palumbo 12'; Pierozzi (yellow card) 37'; Gyasi (yellow card) 66'; Ranocchia 82'	Report	Izzo (yellow card) 37' (red card) 43'; Šimić (yellow card) 45+2'	Stadium: Stadio Renzo Barbera; Attendance: 27,783; Referee: Valerio Crezzini

10 April 2026 34	Frosinone	1–1	Palermo	Frosinone
19:30 CEST (UTC+2)	Bracaglia (yellow card) 43'; Ghedjemis 73'; Calò 75'; Barcella (yellow card) 75'; Zilli (yellow card) 82'	Report	Palumbo (yellow card) 16'; Ranocchia (yellow card) 39', (goal) 89'; Peda (yellow card) 90+1'	Stadium: Stadio Benito Stirpe; Attendance: 14,701; Referee: Simone Sozza

18 April 2026 35	Palermo	2–0	Cesena	Palermo
16:15 CEST (UTC+2)	Pohjanpalo 9', 71'	Report	Cerri (yellow card) 41'	Stadium: Stadio Renzo Barbera; Attendance: 31,959; Referee: Giuseppe Collu

25 April 2026 36	Reggiana	1–1	Palermo	Reggio Emilia
14:00 CEST (UTC+2)	Lambourde 21'; Micai (yellow card) 31'; Papetti (red card) 83'; Lusuardi (yellow card) 89'; Rover (yellow card) 90'	Report	Palumbo (yellow card) 11', (goal) 30'	Stadium: Mapei Stadium; Attendance: 10,403; Referee: ERmanno Feliciani

1 May 2026 37	Palermo	3–2	Catanzaro	Palermo
14:00 CEST (UTC+2)	Johnsen 15', (yellow card) 77'; Gyasi (yellow card) 45+2'; Nuamah 54' (o.g.); Pohjanpalo 86' (pen.)	Report	Pittarello 3', 32'	Stadium: Stadio Renzo Barbera; Attendance: 28,616; Referee: Claudio Giuseppe Allegretta

8 May 2026 38	Venezia	2–0	Palermo	Venice
19:30 CEST (UTC+2)	Doumbia 46', (yellow card) 74'; Compagnon 90+4', (yellow card) 90+5'	Report	Bereszyński (yellow card) 7'; Peda (yellow card) 31'	Stadium: Stadio Pier Luigi Penzo; Attendance: 11,378; Referee: Andrea Zanotti

=== Coppa Italia ===
16 August 2025 First round	Cremonese	0–0 (4–5 p)	Palermo	Cremona
21:15 CEST (UTC+2)		Report		Stadium: Giovanni Zini; Attendance: 5,845; Referee: Andrea Zanotti
	Penalties
	Bondo (penalty scored); Vázquez (penalty scored); Floriani Mussolini (penalty scored); Terracciano (penalty scored); Johnsen (penalty missed)		(penalty scored) Brunori; (penalty scored) Palumbo; (penalty scored) Corona; (penalty scored) Augello; (penalty scored) Ceccaroni

23 September 2025 Second round	Udinese	2–1	Palermo	Udine
18:30 CEST	Zaniolo 41'; Miller 45'	Report	Peda 90+3'	Stadium: Stadio Friuli; Attendance: 6,686; Referee: Andrea Zanotti

=== Appearances and goals ===
As of 23 August 2025

No.	Pos.	Name	Serie B		Coppa Italia		Total	
No.	Pos.	Name		Goal		Goal		Goal
1	GK	(Senegal) Alfred Gomis	0	0	0	0	0	0
3	DF	(Italy) Tommaso Augello	1	0	1	0	2	0
5	MF	(Italy) Antonio Palumbo	1	0	1	0	2	0
6	MF	(France) Claudio Gomes	0	0	0	0	0	0
7	FW	(Italy) Federico Di Francesco	0	0	0	0	0	0
8	MF	(Italy) Jacopo Segre	1	0	1	0	2	0
9	FW	(Italy) Matteo Brunori	1	0	1	0	2	0
10	MF	(Italy) Filippo Ranocchia	1	0	1	0	2	0
11	FW	(Ghana) Emanuel Gyasi	1	0	1	0	2	0
13	DF	(Italy) Mattia Bani	1	0	1	0	2	0
14	MF	(Serbia) Aljosa Vasic	0	0	0	0	0	0
15	DF	(Italy) Ettore Karol Nicolosi	0	0	0	0	0	0
18	DF	(Italy) Pietro Avena	0	0	0	0	0	0
20	FW	(Finland) Joel Pohjanpalo	1	1	1	0	2	1
21	FW	(France) Jérémy Le Douaron	1	0	1	0	2	0
22	GK	(Italy) Francesco Bardi	1	0	1	0	2	0
23	DF	(France) Salim Diakité	1	0	1	0	2	0
24	DF	(Italy) Giangiacomo Magnani	0	0	0	0	0	0
27	DF	(Italy) Niccolò Pierozzi	1	1	1	0	2	1
28	MF	(France) Alexis Blin	1	0	1	0	2	0
29	DF	(Poland) Patryk Peda	1	0	1	0	2	0
31	FW	(Italy) Giacomo Corona	1	0	1	0	2	0
32	DF	(Italy) Pietro Ceccaroni	1	0	1	0	2	0
63	GK	(Italy) Francesco Cutrona	0	0	0	0	0	0
66	GK	(Finland) Jesse Joronen	0	0	0	0	0	0
72	DF	(Italy) Davide Veroli	0	0	0	0	0	0
77	GK	(Italy) Francesco Di Bartolo	0	0	0	0	0	0
80	MF	(Italy) Salvatore Squillacioti	0	0	0	0	0	0
86	MF	(Italy) Valerio Brutto	0	0	0	0	0	0
Own goals			—	0	—	0	—	0
Totals			—	2	—	0	—	1

=== Disciplinary record ===
As of 23 August 2025

No.	Pos.	Name	Serie B			Coppa Italia			Total		
No.	Pos.	Name	Yellow card	(yellow card) (yellow-red card)	Red card	Yellow card	(yellow card) (yellow-red card)	Red card	Yellow card	(yellow card) (yellow-red card)	Red card
23	DF	(France) Salim Diakité	1	0	0	0	0	0	1	0	0
Totals			1	0	0	0	0	0	1	0	0

=== Goals conceded and clean sheets ===
As of 23 August 2025

No.	Pos.	Name	Serie B		Coppa Italia		Total	
No.	Pos.	Name	Goal		Goal		Goal	
22	GK	(Italy) Francesco Bardi	1	0	0	1	1	1
Totals			1	0	0	1	1	1

=== Attendances ===
As of 23 August 2025

	Matches	Attendances	Average	Highest	Lowest
Serie B	1	30,868	30,868	30,868	30,868
Coppa Italia	–				
