= 2020–21 Calcio Foggia 1920 season =

Foggia
2020–21 season
- Chairman: Roberto Felleca
- Manager: Marco Marchionni
- Stadium: Stadio Pino Zaccheria
- Serie C Group C: 9th
- Promotion play-offs: Second preliminary round
- Coppa Italia Serie C: First round
- Top goalscorer: League: Alessio Curcio (13); All: Alessio Curcio (14)

The 2020–21 season was Calcio Foggia 1920's 101st season in existence and fourth consecutive season in the Serie C, the third division of Italian football.

== Players ==
=== First-team squad ===
As of 1 February 2021

Note: Flags indicate national team as defined under FIFA eligibility rules; some limited exceptions apply. Players may hold more than one non-FIFA nationality.

No.	Pos.	Nation	Player
1	GK	ITA	Ermanno Fumagalli
2	DF	ITA	Gioacchino Galeotafiore (on loan from Salernitana)
3	MF	ITA	Gaetano Vitale (on loan from Salernitana)
4	DF	ITA	Fabio Gavazzi (Vice-captain)
5	DF	ITA	Christian Anelli
6	MF	ITA	Manlio Di Masi
9	FW	ITA	Simone Dell'Agnello
10	MF	ITA	Alessio Curcio
11	FW	ITA	Filippo D'Andrea (on loan from Salernitana)
12	GK	ITA	Davide Di Stasio
13	DF	ITA	Gabriele Germinio
14	MF	ITA	Silvano Raggio Garibaldi
15	MF	TAN	Carte Said
16	DF	ITA	Giuseppe Agostinone (Captain)
17	MF	ITA	Stefano Salvi
18	DF	ITA	Lorenzo Del Prete
19	DF	ITA	Sedrick Kalombo (on loan from Salernitana)

No.	Pos.	Nation	Player
20	MF	ITA	Patrick Moreschini
21	MF	ITA	Vincenzo Garofalo
22	GK	ITA	Andrea Mascolo
23	DF	ITA	Roberto Di Jenno
24	FW	ITA	Emiliano Dema
25	MF	ITA	Biagio Morrone (on loan from Lazio)
26	MF	ITA	Matteo Iurato
27	MF	ITA	Riccardo Aramini
28	DF	ITA	Savino Pompa
29	DF	ITA	Valerio Cardamone
30	FW	KOS	Rilind Nivokazi
31	DF	ITA	Alessandro Tomassini
32	FW	ESP	Ibourahima Baldé (on loan from Sampdoria)
33	MF	ITA	Michele Rocca
35	DF	ITA	Nicola Turi
36	GK	ITA	Lorenzo Jorio

=== Out on loan ===
Note: Flags indicate national team as defined under FIFA eligibility rules; some limited exceptions apply. Players may hold more than one non-FIFA nationality.

No. / Pos. / Nation / Player; — / DF / ITA / Simone Buono (at Folgore Caratese)	No. / Pos. / Nation / Player; — / MF / ITA / Federico Gentile (at Fano)

== Pre-season and friendlies ==
Win Draw Loss

8 September 2020 Friendly	ASD Trevi	9–0	Foggia	Trevi

10 September 2020 Friendly	Atletico Genazzano	1–5	Foggia	Trevi

14 September 2020 Friendly	Foggia	4–2	Atletico Fiuggi	Trevi

17 September 2020 Friendly	Foggia	1–0	Avezzano	Trevi
	Calemme

== Competitions ==
=== Overall record ===
Competition	First match	Last match	Starting round	Final position	Record							
Competition	First match	Last match	Starting round	Final position	Pld	W	D	L	GF	GA	GD	Win %
Serie C	11 October 2020	2 May 2021	Matchday 1	9th	36	14	9	13	36	39	−3	38.89
Serie C promotion play-offs	9 May 2021	19 May 2021	First preliminary round	Second preliminary round	2	1	0	1	4	4	+0	50.00
Total					38	15	9	14	40	43	−3	39.47

Source: Competitions

=== Serie C ===
==== League table ====
Pos	Team	Pld	W	D	L	GF	GA	GD	Pts	Qualification
7	Palermo	36	14	11	11	44	40	+4	53	Qualification to the promotion play-offs
8	Teramo	36	13	13	10	38	34	+4	52	Qualification to the promotion play-offs
9	Foggia	36	14	9	13	36	39	−3	51	Qualification to the promotion play-offs
10	Casertana (D, R)	36	13	6	17	47	59	−12	45	Excluded and relegated to Serie D
11	Monopoli	36	10	11	15	43	51	−8	41	

Source: Lega Pro (in Italian), Soccerway (in English)
Rules for classification: 1) Points; 2) Head-to-head points; 3) Head-to-head goal difference; 4) Goal difference; 5) Goals scored; 6) Lower goals against; 7) Wins; 8) Lower losses; 9) Away wins; 10) Lower home losses.
(D) Disqualified; (R) Relegated

==== Results summary ====
Overall								Home						Away					
Pld	W	D	L	GF	GA	GD	Pts	W	D	L	GF	GA	GD	W	D	L	GF	GA	GD
36	14	9	13	36	39	−3	51	6	7	5	17	17	0	8	2	8	19	22	−3

==== Results by round ====
Round	1	2	3	4	5	6	7	8	9	10	11	12	13	14	15	16	17	18	19	20	21	22	23	24	25	26	27	28	29	30	31	32	33	34	35	36	37	38
Ground	H	A	A	H	A	H	A	H	A	H	A	H	A	H	A	H	A	H	A	A	H	H	A	H	A	H	A	H	A	H	A	H	A	H	A	H	A	H
Result	L	W	L	W	L	L	L	W	D	D	W	D	W	W	W	C	W	D	L	D	W	D	W	L	L	L	L	D	W	W	W	D	L	W	C	L	L	D
Position	18	7	15	6	11	11	13	9	10	10	10	10	9	6	6	7	5	5	7	7	6	6	4	6	6	6	8	8	7	7	6	6	7	7	7	7	8	9

Source: Worldfootball
A = Away; H = Home; W = Win; D = Draw; L = Loss; C = Cancelled

==== Matches ====
11 October 2020 4	Foggia	2–0	Potenza	Foggia
20:45 CEST (UTC+2)	Germinio 44'; Dell'Agnello 73'			Stadium: Stadio Pino Zaccheria; Referee: Michele Di Cairano

14 October 2020 1	Foggia	1–3	Bisceglie	Foggia
15:00 CEST (UTC+2)	Curcio 10'		Cittadino 13' (pen.), 90+6' (pen.); Rocco 73'	Stadium: Stadio Pino Zaccheria; Referee: Stefano Nicolini

18 October 2020 5	Catanzaro	2–1	Foggia	Catanzaro
17:30 CEST (UTC+2)	Evacuo 18'; Carlini 73'		Curcio 34' (pen.); Anelli (red card) 77'	Stadium: Stadio Nicola Ceravolo; Referee: Gianpiero Miele

22 October 2020 6	Foggia	1–2	Avellino	Foggia
CEST (UTC+2)				Stadium: Stadio Pino Zaccheria

25 October 2020 7	Ternana	2–0	Foggia	Terni
CEST (UTC+2)				Stadium: Stadio Libero Liberati

1 November 2020 8	Foggia	1–0	Bari	Foggia
CET (UTC+1)				Stadium: Stadio Pino Zaccheria

4 November 2020 2	Casertana	0–2	Foggia	Caserta
CEST (UTC+2)				Stadium: Stadio Alberto Pinto

11 November 2020 10	Foggia	2–2	Turris	Foggia
CET (UTC+1)				Stadium: Stadio Pino Zaccheria

15 November 2020 11	Cavese	0–1	Foggia	Cava de' Tirreni
CET (UTC+1)

18 November 2020 3	Teramo	2–0	Foggia	Teramo
CEST (UTC+2)				Stadium: Stadio Gaetano Bonolis

22 November 2020 12	Foggia	1–1	Virtus Francavilla	Foggia
CET (UTC+1)				Stadium: Stadio Pino Zaccheria

25 November 2020 9	Vibonese	1–1	Foggia	Vibo Valentia
CET (UTC+1)

29 November 2020 13	Viterbese	0–1	Foggia	Viterbo
CET (UTC+1)

6 December 2020 14	Foggia	2–0	Palermo	Foggia
CET (UTC+1)				Stadium: Stadio Pino Zaccheria

13 December 2020 15	Monopoli	2–3	Foggia	Monopoli
CET (UTC+1)				Stadium: Stadio Vito Simone Veneziani

20 December 2020 16	Foggia	v	Trapani	Foggia
CET (UTC+1)				Stadium: Stadio Pino Zaccheria

23 December 2020 17	Paganese	1–4	Foggia	Pagani
CET (UTC+1)

11 January 2021 18	Foggia	1–1	Juve Stabia	Foggia
CET (UTC+1)				Stadium: Stadio Pino Zaccheria

17 January 2021 19	Catania	2–1	Foggia	Catania
CET (UTC+1)				Stadium: Stadio Angelo Massimino

24 January 2021 20	Bisceglie	0–0	Foggia	Bisceglie
CET (UTC+1)

30 January 2021 21	Foggia	1–0	Casertana	Foggia
CET (UTC+1)				Stadium: Stadio Pino Zaccheria

2 February 2021 22	Foggia	0–0	Teramo	Foggia
CET (UTC+1)				Stadium: Stadio Pino Zaccheria

7 February 2021 23	Potenza	0–1	Foggia	Potenza
CET (UTC+1)

13 February 2021 24	Foggia	0–2	Catanzaro	Foggia
CET (UTC+1)				Stadium: Stadio Pino Zaccheria

17 February 2021 25	Avellino	4–0	Foggia	Avellino
CET (UTC+1)				Stadium: Stadio Partenio-Adriano Lombardi

21 February 2021 26	Foggia	0–2	Ternana	Foggia
CET (UTC+1)				Stadium: Stadio Pino Zaccheria

27 February 2021 27	Bari	1–0	Foggia	Bari
15:00 CET (UTC+1)	Maita (red card) 37'; Cianci 60'	Report		Stadium: Stadio San Nicola; Referee: Ermanno Feliciani

3 March 2021 28	Foggia	0–0	Vibonese	Foggia
15:00 CET (UTC+1)				Stadium: Stadio Pino Zaccheria; Referee: Niccolo Turrini

7 March 2021 29	Turris	1–3	Foggia	Torre del Greco
20:30 CET (UTC+1)	Loreto 28'		Curcio 23', 89'; Ferretti 81' (o.g.)	Stadium: Stadio Amerigo Liguori; Referee: Mattia Caldera

14 March 2021 30	Foggia	1–0	Cavese	Foggia
15:00 CET (UTC+1)	Baldé 20'			Stadium: Stadio Pino Zaccheria; Referee: Ermes Cavaliere

17 March 2021 31	Virtus Francavilla	0–1	Foggia	Francavilla Fontana
15:00 CET (UTC+1)			Gavazzi 84'; Salvi (red card) 88'	Stadium: Stadio Giovanni Paolo II; Referee: Michele Delrio

21 March 2021 32	Foggia	1–1	Viterbese	Foggia
15:00 CET (UTC+1)	Rocca 41' (pen.)		Baschirotto 48'	Stadium: Stadio Pino Zaccheria; Referee: Alberto Arena

11 April 2021 35	Trapani	v	Foggia	Erice
				Stadium: Stadio Polisportivo Provinciale

14 April 2021 33	Palermo	1–0	Foggia	Palermo
15:00 CEST (UTC+2)	Valente 82'			Stadium: Stadio Renzo Barbera; Referee: Federico Longo

18 April 2021 36	Foggia	0–1	Paganese	Foggia
15:00 CEST (UTC+2)			Diop (red card) 24'; Mendicino 81'	Stadium: Stadio Pino Zaccheria; Referee: Emanuele Frascaro

21 April 2021 34	Foggia	1–0	Monopoli	Foggia
15:00 CEST (UTC+2)	Curcio 84'			Stadium: Stadio Pino Zaccheria; Referee: Daniele De Tommaso
Note: Postponed from 3 April 2021.

25 April 2021 37	Juve Stabia	3–0	Foggia	Castellammare di Stabia
17:30 CEST (UTC+2)	Borrelli 14'; Marotta 53', 65'			Stadium: Stadio Romeo Menti; Referee: Filippo Giaccaglia

2 May 2021 38	Foggia	2–2	Catania	Foggia
20:30 CEST (UTC+2)	Curcio 15'; D'Andrea 20'		Golfo 34', 77'	Stadium: Stadio Pino Zaccheria; Referee: Mario Davide Arace

==== Promotion play-offs ====
9 May 2021 First preliminary round	Catania	1–3	Foggia	Catania
17:30 CEST (UTC+2)	Maldonado 69'		Baldé 34', 72'; Curcio 63'	Stadium: Stadio Angelo Massimino; Referee: Valerio Maranesi

19 May 2021 Second preliminary round	Bari	3–1	Foggia	Bari
17:45 CEST (UTC+2)	Marras 25'; D'Ursi 39', 56'		Di Jenno 53'	Stadium: Stadio San Nicola; Referee: Luca Zufferli
