= 2023–24 Palermo FC season =

Palermo
2023–24 season
- Owner: City Football Group (94,94%); Hera Hora S.r.l. (5%); Associazione Amici Rosanero (0,06%)
- Chairman: Dario Mirri
- Manager: Eugenio Corini (Matchdays 1–31); Michele Mignani (Matchdays 32–38 and play-offs)
- Stadium: Renzo Barbera
- Serie B: 6th
- Play-offs: Semi-finals
- Coppa Italia: Round of 64
- Top goalscorer: League: Matteo Brunori (17); All: Matteo Brunori (17)
- Highest home attendance: 32,753 (v Venezia, play-offs)
- Lowest home attendance: 16,279 (v Pisa)
- Average home league attendance: 22,717
- Biggest win: 3–0 (v Feralpisalò, Bari and Como)
- Biggest defeat: 0–3 (v Venezia, regular season)
Home colours	Away colours	Third colours

The 2023–24 season was the 95th in the history of Palermo FC and their second season in a row in the second division. The club participated in Serie B and Coppa Italia.

== Players ==
=== First team squad ===
Note: Flags indicate national team as defined under FIFA eligibility rules; some limited exceptions apply. Players may hold more than one non-FIFA nationality.

No.	Pos.	Nation	Player
1	GK	ITA	Sebastiano Desplanches
2	DF	DEN	Simon Graves
3	DF	USA	Kristoffer Lund
4	MF	FRA	Claudio Gomes
5	DF	ITA	Fabio Lucioni
6	MF	SLO	Leo Štulac
7	FW	ITA	Leonardo Mancuso
8	MF	ITA	Jacopo Segre
9	FW	ITA	Matteo Brunori (Captain)
10	FW	ITA	Francesco Di Mariano
11	FW	ITA	Roberto Insigne
12	GK	ITA	Manfredi Nespola
13	GK	BIH	Adnan Kanurić
14	MF	ITA	Filippo Ranocchia
15	DF	ITA	Ivan Marconi
17	FW	ITA	Federico Di Francesco
18	DF	ROU	Ionuț Nedelcearu

No.	Pos.	Nation	Player
20	MF	SRB	Aljosa Vasic
21	MF	ITA	Samuele Damiani
22	GK	ITA	Mirko Pigliacelli
23	MF	BIH	Dario Šarić
23	DF	FRA	Salim Diakité
25	DF	ITA	Alessio Buttaro
27	FW	ITA	Edoardo Soleri
30	FW	ITA	Nicola Valente
31	DF	ITA	Giuseppe Aurelio
32	DF	ITA	Pietro Ceccaroni
37	DF	CZE	Aleš Matějů
53	MF	SCO	Liam Henderson
70	FW	CIV	Chaka Traorè
80	MF	SEN	Mamadou Coulibaly
—	DF	ALB	Masimiliano Doda
—	DF	GAM	Bubacarr Marong

== Transfers ==
=== Summer 2023 ===
In
Date	Pos.	Name	From	Type	Fee	Ref.
26 June 2023	DF	(Italy) Fabio Lucioni	(Italy) Lecce	Permanent deal	Undisclosed	
1 July 2023	DF	(Italy) Roberto Crivello	(Italy) Padova	End of loan	Free	
1 July 2023	DF	(Serbia) Mladen Devetak	(Italy) Viterbese	End of loan	Free	
1 July 2023	DF	(Albania) Masimiliano Doda	(Italy) Imolese	End of loan	Free	
1 July 2023	DF	(The Gambia) Bubacarr Marong	(Italy) Gelbison	End of loan	Free	
1 July 2023	DF	(Italy) Manuel Peretti	(Italy) Recanatese	End of loan	Free	
1 July 2023	FW	(Italy) Giacomo Corona	(Italy) Torino	End of loan	Free	
1 July 2023	FW	(Italy) Giuseppe Fella	(Italy) Monopoli	End of loan	Free	
1 July 2023	FW	(Italy) Andrea Silipo	(Italy) Juve Stabia	End of loan	Free	
4 July 2023	MF	(Serbia) Aljosa Vasic	(Italy) Padova	Permanent deal	€2.2M	
6 July 2023	FW	(Italy) Leonardo Mancuso	(Italy) Monza	Loan	Free	
7 July 2023	DF	(Italy) Pietro Ceccaroni	Unattached (Note: Previous club: Venezia.)	Permanent deal	Free	
12 July 2023	FW	(Italy) Roberto Insigne	(Italy) Frosinone	Permanent deal	€1M	
17 July 2023	GK	(Italy) Sebastiano Desplanches	(Italy) LR Vicenza	Permanent deal	€2M	
21 August 2023	DF	(United States) Kristoffer Lund	(Sweden) BK Häcken	Permanent deal	€2.5M	
28 August 2023	MF	(Scotland) Liam Henderson	(Italy) Empoli	Loan with a conditional obligation to buy	Free	
31 August 2023	FW	(Italy) Federico Di Francesco	(Italy) Lecce	Permanent deal	€1.3M	
1 September 2023	MF	(Senegal) Mamadou Coulibaly	(Italy) Salernitana	Loan with an option to by	Free	
1 September 2023	DF	(Poland) Patryk Peda	(Italy) SPAL	Permanent deal	€0.6M	
12 September 2023	GK	(Bosnia and Herzegovina) Adnan Kanurić	Unattached (Note: Previous club: Nottingham Forest.)	Permanent deal	Free	
Out
Date	Pos.	Name	To	Type	Fee	Ref.
1 July 2023	DF	(Italy) Edoardo Lancini	Unattached (Note: Joined Virtus Entella after release.)	Contract expired	Free	
1 July 2023	DF	(Italy) Davide Bettella	(Italy) Monza	End of loan	Free	
1 July 2023	DF	(Italy) Edoardo Masciangelo	(Italy) Benevento	End of loan	Free	
1 July 2023	DF	(Uruguay) Renzo Orihuela	(Uruguay) Montevideo City Torque	End of loan	Free	
1 July 2023	DF	(Italy) Marco Sala	(Italy) Sassuolo	End of loan	Free	
1 July 2023	MF	(Italy) Salvatore Elia	(Italy) Atalanta	End of loan	Free	
1 July 2023	FW	(Italy) Luca Vido	(Italy) Atalanta	End of loan	Free	
1 July 2023	MF	(Italy) Valerio Verre	(Italy) Sampdoria	End of loan	Free	
1 July 2023	FW	(Italy) Gennaro Tutino	(Italy) Parma	End of loan	Free	
12 July 2023	DF	(Italy) Manuel Peretti	(Italy) Recanatese	Permanent deal	Undisclosed	
13 July 2023	DF	(Serbia) Mladen Devetak	(Croatia) Istra	Loan with an option to buy	Free	
18 July 2023	GK	(Italy) Samuele Massolo	(Italy) LR Vicenza	Permanent deal	Undisclosed	
1 August 2023	FW	(Italy) Giuseppe Fella	(Italy) Latina	Loan	Free	
10 August 2023	FW	(Italy) Giacomo Corona	(Italy) Empoli	Loan with an option to buy and counter-option	Free	
11 August 2023	MF	(Italy) Jérémie Broh	(Italy) Südtirol	Loan	Free	
11 August 2023	FW	(Italy) Andrea Silipo	(Italy) Monterosi	Permanent deal	Undisclosed	
25 August 2023	MF	(Bosnia and Herzegovina) Dario Šarić	(Turkey) Antalyaspor	Loan with an option to buy	Free	
1 September 2023	DF	(Italy) Roberto Crivello	Unattached	Released	Free	
1 September 2023	MF	(Italy) Samuele Damiani	(Italy) Juventus	Loan	Free	
1 September 2023	DF	(Poland) Patryk Peda	(Italy) SPAL	Loan	Free	

=== Winter 2024 ===
In
Date	Pos.	Name	From	Type	Fee	Ref.
18 January 2024	MF	(Italy) Filippo Ranocchia	(Italy) Juventus	Permanent deal	€4M	
25 January 2024	DF	(France) Salim Diakité	(Italy) Ternana	Permanent deal	€1.4M	
1 February 2024	FW	(Ivory Coast) Chaka Traorè	(Italy) Milan	Loan with an option to buy	Free	
Out
Date	Pos.	Name	To	Type	Fee	Ref.
24 January 2024	DF	(Czech Republic) Aleš Matějů	(Italy) Spezia	Permanent deal	Undisclosed	
1 February 2024	FW	(Italy) Nicola Valente	(Italy) Padova	Permanent deal	Undisclosed	

== Pre-season and friendlies ==
Win Draw Loss Fixtures

15 July 2023 Friendly	(Italy) Non Valley local amateur team	0–12	Palermo	Ronzone
17:00 CEST (UTC+2)		Report	Brunori 16'; Nedelcearu 17'; Valente 29'; Segre 34'; Insigne 42'; Vasic 46', 63', 65'; Mancuso 53', 73'; Soleri (penalty missed) 73' 76'	Stadium: Campo sportivo Ronzone; Referee: Pietro Brentegani

19 July 2023 Friendly	(Italy) Virtus Verona	1–0	Palermo	Ronzone
17:00 CEST (UTC+2)	Menato 58'	Report		Stadium: Campo sportivo Ronzone; Referee: Mattia Rodighiero

22 July 2023 Friendly	(Italy) Bologna	2–2	Palermo	Rovereto
18:00 CEST (UTC+2)	Barrow 5'; Raimondo 62'	Report	Damiani 67'; Soleri 90'	Stadium: Quercia; Referee: Simone Sozza

30 July 2023 Friendly	(Italy) Legnago	1–1	Palermo	Pinzolo
16:30 CEST (UTC+2)	Rocco 83' (pen.)	Report	Brunori 5'; Insigne (penalty missed) 60'; Soleri (yellow card) 66'	Stadium: Campo sportivo comunale Pineta; Referee: Luka Meta

4 August 2023 Friendly	(Italy) Trento	0–3	Palermo	Trento
16:30 CEST (UTC+2)		Report	Ceccaroni 31'; Vasic 38'; Brunori 44' (pen.)	Stadium: Briamasco; Referee: Francesco Duranti

24 August 2023 Friendly	Palermo	5–1	(Malta) Melita	Palermo
20:30 CEST (UTC+2)	Brunori 11'; Di Mariano 52'; Soleri 57', 66'; Valente 77'	Report	Motta 81'	Stadium: Renzo Barbera; Attendance: 9,789; Referee: Fabrizio Ramondino

23 March 2024 Friendly	Palermo	2–1	(Belgium) Lommel	Palermo
14:00 CET (UTC+1)	Di Francesco 54'; Gomes 74'	Report	Fatah 90+1'	Stadium: Renzo Barbera; Attendance: 3,995; Referee: Fabrizio Ramondino

== Competitions ==
=== Overall record ===
Competition	First match	Last match	Starting round	Final position	Record							
Competition	First match	Last match	Starting round	Final position	Pld	W	D	L	GF	GA	GD	Win %
Serie B	18 August 2023	10 May 2024	Matchday 1	6th	38	15	11	12	62	53	+9	39.47
Play-offs	17 May 2024	24 May 2024	Preliminary round	Semi-finals	3	1	0	2	3	3	+0	33.33
Coppa Italia	12 August 2023		Round of 64	Round of 64	1	0	0	1	1	2	−1	0.00
Total					42	16	11	15	66	58	+8	38.10

Source: Palermo F.C.

=== Serie B ===
==== League table ====
Pos	Team	Pld	W	D	L	GF	GA	GD	Pts	Promotion, qualification or relegation
4	Cremonese	38	19	10	9	50	32	+18	67	Qualification for promotion play-offs semi-finals
5	Catanzaro	38	17	9	12	59	50	+9	60	Qualification for promotion play-offs preliminary round
6	Palermo	38	15	11	12	62	53	+9	56	Qualification for promotion play-offs preliminary round
7	Sampdoria (Note: Sampdoria were deducted 2 points due to failure in paying taxes between January and March 2023.)	38	16	9	13	53	50	+3	55	Qualification for promotion play-offs preliminary round
8	Brescia	38	12	15	11	44	40	+4	51	Qualification for promotion play-offs preliminary round

Source: Soccerway (in English)
Rules for classification: 1) Points; 2) Head-to-head points; 3) Head-to-head goal difference; 4) Goal difference; 5) Goals scored; 6) Draw.
(Note: Head-to-head record is used only after all the matches between the teams in question have been played)

==== Results summary ====
Overall								Home						Away					
Pld	W	D	L	GF	GA	GD	Pts	W	D	L	GF	GA	GD	W	D	L	GF	GA	GD
38	15	11	12	62	53	+9	56	8	4	7	33	27	+6	7	7	5	29	26	+3

Source: Soccerway

==== Results by round ====
Round	1	2	3	4	5	6	7	8	9	10	11	12	13	14	15	16	17	18	19	20	21	22	23	24	25	26	27	28	29	30	31	32	33	34	35	36	37	38
Ground	A	H (Note: Played between rounds 12 and 13.)	A	H	A	H	A	H	A	H	H	A	H	A	H	A	H	A	H	A	H	A	H	A	H	A	H	A	A	H	A	H	A	H	H	A	H	A
Result	D	W	W	W	W	L	W	W	W	D	L	L	L	D	L	D	W	D	W	L	W	D	W	W	W	D	L	L	W	L	L	D	D	D	L	L	D	W
Position	8	11	8	5	3	5	2	2	2	3	4	5	3	4	8	8	7	7	6	7	6	6	5	5	3	4	5	6	5	6	6	6	6	6	6	6	6	6

Source: WorldFootball.net
A = Away; H = Home; W = Win; D = Draw; L = Loss

Note

In order to preserve chronological evolvements, any postponed matches are not included to the round at which they were originally scheduled, but added to the full round they were played immediately afterwards.

==== Matches ====
18 August 2023 1	Bari	0–0	Palermo	Bari
20:30 CEST (UTC+2)	Maita (red card) 50'; Di Cesare (yellow card) 50' (yellow-red card) 66'; Sibilli (yellow card) 51'; Maiello (yellow card) 67'; Benali (yellow card) 70'; Ménez (yellow card) 90+2'; Brenno (yellow card) 90+3'	Report	Marconi (yellow card) 24'; Brunori (yellow card) 64'; Di Mariano (penalty missed) 68'; Vasic (yellow card) 73'; Insigne (yellow card) 76'	Stadium: San Nicola; Attendance: 22,811; Referee: Fabio Maresca

8 November 2023 2	Palermo	1–0	Brescia	Palermo
18:30 CET (UTC+1)	Coulibaly 27'; Mateju (yellow card) 46'; Soleri (yellow card) 73'; Lund (yellow card) 88'	Report	Dickmann (yellow card) 1'; Cistana (yellow card) 17'; Fogliata (yellow card) 55'; Van de Looi (yellow card) 79'	Stadium: Renzo Barbera; Attendance: 16,914; Referee: Giacomo Camplone

29 August 2023 3	Reggiana	1–3	Palermo	Reggio Emilia
20:30 CEST (UTC+2)	Rozzio (yellow card) 27'; Mercandalli (red card) 42'; Romagna (yellow card) 44'; Lanini 63'; Kabashi (yellow card) 75'	Report	Lucioni 7'; Segre 71'; Soleri 90+5'	Stadium: Mapei Stadium – Città del Tricolore; Attendance: 10,374; Referee: Paride Tremolada

2 September 2023 4	Palermo	3–0	Feralpisalò	Palermo
18:30 CEST (UTC+2)	Insigne 15'; Štulac 46'; Valente (yellow card) 60'; Di Francesco 85'	Report	Fiordilino (yellow card) 65'	Stadium: Renzo Barbera; Attendance: 22,667; Referee: Kevin Bonacina

16 September 2023 5	Ascoli	0–1	Palermo	Ascoli Piceno
14:00 CEST (UTC+2)		Report	Aurelio (yellow card) 24'; Coulibaly (yellow card) 89'; Mancuso 90+2'	Stadium: Cino e Lillo Del Duca; Attendance: 6,806; Referee: Federico Dionisi

22 September 2023 6	Palermo	0–1	Cosenza	Palermo
20:30 CEST (UTC+2)	Segre (yellow card) 89'	Report	D'Orazio (yellow card) 58'; Canotto 90+1' (yellow card) 90+2'; Tutino (yellow card) 90+1'	Stadium: Renzo Barbera; Attendance: 26,007; Referee: Marco Monaldi

26 September 2023 7	Venezia	1–3	Palermo	Venice
20:30 CEST (UTC+2)	Busio (yellow card) 12'; Pohjanpalo 45+5'	Report	Brunori 9' (pen.), 62', 90+2'; Lucioni (yellow card) 32'; Gomes (yellow card) 45+7'	Stadium: Pier Luigi Penzo; Attendance: 6,748; Referee: Niccolò Baroni

1 October 2023 8	Palermo	2–1	Südtirol	Palermo
16:15 CEST (UTC+2)	Segre (yellow card) 21'; Štulac (yellow card) 33'; Ceccaroni 48'; Coulibaly (yellow card) 61'; Aurelio 89' (yellow card) 90'; Gomes (yellow card) 90+7'	Report	Ciervo 38'; Cuomo (yellow card) 40'; Poluzzi (yellow card) 43'; Cagnano (yellow card) 90+7'	Stadium: Renzo Barbera; Attendance: 24,402; Referee: Matteo Marcenaro

7 October 2023 9	Modena	0–2	Palermo	Modena
14:00 CEST (UTC+2)	Oukhadda (red card) 23'; Manconi (yellow card) 54'; Duca (yellow card) 69'	Report	Lucioni (yellow card) 44'; Henderson 47'; Coulibaly (yellow card) 60'; Di Francesco (yellow card) 69'; Mancuso 90+3'	Stadium: Alberto Braglia; Attendance: 12,840; Referee: Gianluca Aureliano

23 October 2023 10	Palermo	2–2	Spezia	Palermo
20:30 CEST (UTC+2)	Brunori (yellow card) 7'; Lucioni (yellow card) 36'; Mancuso 73'; Ceccaroni (yellow card) 87'; Štulac 90+14'	Report	Cassata (yellow card) 7'; Bertola (yellow card) 17' (yellow-red card) 90+12'; Reca 31'; Drągowski (yellow card) 57'; Żurkowski (yellow card) 63'; F. Esposito 70'; Nikolau (yellow card) 90'	Stadium: Renzo Barbera; Attendance: 29,117; Referee: Francesco Fournaeu

29 October 2023 11	Palermo	1–2	Lecco	Palermo
16:15 CEST (UTC+2)	Mateju (yellow card) 45+5'; Štulac (yellow card) 68'; Brunori 90+6' (pen.)	Report	Crociata 8'; Celjak (yellow card) 14'; Sersanti 41'; Caporale (yellow card) 43'	Stadium: Renzo Barbera; Attendance: 25,799; Referee: Marco Piccinini

4 November 2023 12	Sampdoria	1–0	Palermo	Genoa
16:15 CET (UTC+1)	Verre (yellow card) 11'; Borini (penalty missed) 44' 44' (yellow card) 64'; Yepes (yellow card) 63'; Ghilardi (yellow card) 87'	Report	Nedelcearu (yellow card) 23'; Mateju (yellow card) 81'	Stadium: Luigi Ferraris; Attendance: 21,796; Referee: Daniele Doveri

12 November 2023 13	Palermo	0–1	Cittadella	Palermo
16:15 CET (UTC+1)	Segre (yellow card) 90+5'	Report	Amatucci (yellow card) 8'; Salvi (yellow card) 56'; Branca (yellow card) 90+5'; Pandolfi 90+7' (yellow card) 90+8'	Stadium: Renzo Barbera; Attendance: 18,402; Referee: Michael Fabbri

26 November 2023 14	Ternana	1–1	Palermo	Terni
16:15 CET (UTC+1)	Corrado (yellow card) 28' (yellow-red card) 75'; Casasola 63'; Raimondo (yellow card) 78'	Report	Lucioni 31'; Coulibaly (yellow card) 38'; Mateju (yellow card) 43'	Stadium: Libero Liberati; Attendance: 6,911; Referee: Daniele Rutella

1 December 2023 15	Palermo	1–2	Catanzaro	Palermo
20:30 CET (UTC+1)	Di Mariano (yellow card) 10'; Buttaro (yellow card) 68'; Štulac 82' (yellow card) 90'; Brunori (yellow card) 90+1'	Report	Vandeputte (yellow card) 16'; Iemmello 44'; Biasci 49'; Katseris (yellow card) 61'; Pompetti (yellow card) 75'; Oliveri (yellow card) 90+1'; Miranda (yellow card) 90+2'	Stadium: Renzo Barbera; Attendance: 19,492; Referee: Livio Marinelli

10 December 2023 16	Parma	3–3	Palermo	Parma
16:15 CET (UTC+1)	Balogh (yellow card) 35'; Estévez 51'; Del Prato (yellow card) 55'; Bonny (yellow card) 64'; Benedyczak (yellow card) 90'; Mihăilă 90+1'; Charpentier 90+5'	Report	Brunori 3', 18'; Di Francesco (yellow card) 16'; Valente (yellow card) 80'; Segre 85'; Mateju (yellow card) 90'	Stadium: Ennio Tardini; Attendance: 13,409; Referee: Davide Massa

16 December 2023 17	Palermo	3–2	Pisa	Palermo
16:15 CET (UTC+1)	Insigne 29'; Brunori 42' (yellow card) 90+6'; Lund (yellow card) 55'; Segre 80'; Lucioni (yellow card) 81'; Soleri (yellow card) 89'	Report	Marin 49' (red card) 61'; Valoti 54'; Hermannsson (yellow card) 90'	Stadium: Renzo Barbera; Attendance: 16,279; Referee: Giuseppe Collu

23 December 2023 18	Como	3–3	Palermo	Como
14:00 CET (UTC+1)	Sala (yellow card) 41'; Cutrone 46' (yellow card) 66'; Gabrielloni 58'; Curto (yellow card) 67'; Da Cunha (yellow card) 81'; Verdi 90+2' (pen.)	Report	Di Francesco 17'; Nedelcearu (yellow card) 48'; Marconi (yellow card) 53' (red card) 91'; Segre 63'; Graves 82'	Stadium: Giuseppe Sinigaglia; Attendance: 6,362; Referee: Luca Pairetto

26 December 2023 19	Palermo	3–2	Cremonese	Palermo
18:00 CET (UTC+1)	Nedelcearu 20'; Graves (yellow card) 40'; Di Francesco 72'; Ceccaroni (yellow card) 90+4'; Štulac 90+7'	Report	Majer (yellow card) 6'; Ghiglione 7'; Castagnetti 32'; Okereke (yellow card) 90+4'	Stadium: Renzo Barbera; Attendance: 22,826; Referee: Maria Sole Ferrieri Caputi

13 January 2024 20	Cittadella	2–0	Palermo	Cittadella
14:00 CET (UTC+1)	Pandolfi 26'; Vita 80'; Branca (yellow card) 90+5'	Report	Štulac (yellow card) 30' (yellow-red card) 50'	Stadium: Piercesare Tombolato; Attendance: 6,050; Referee: Luca Massimi

20 January 2024 21	Palermo	4–2	Modena	Palermo
16:15 CET (UTC+1)	Segre 8'; Brunori 35' (yellow card) 45+2'; Soleri 88', 90+6'	Report	Ponsi (yellow card) 7'; Tremolada (yellow card) 22'; Battistella 31'; Pergreffi (yellow card) 38'; Abiuso 59' (yellow card) 84'; Strizzolo (yellow card) 76'	Stadium: Renzo Barbera; Attendance: 17,248; Referee: Kevin Bonacina

26 January 2024 22	Catanzaro	1–1	Palermo	Catanzaro
20:30 CET (UTC+1)	Biasci 22'; Brighenti (yellow card) 77'	Report	Segre 48'; Ranocchia (yellow card) 76'	Stadium: Nicola Ceravolo; Attendance: 9,861; Referee: Niccolò Baroni

2 February 2024 23	Palermo	3–0	Bari	Palermo
20:30 CET (UTC+1)	Ranocchia 44'; Di Francesco (yellow card) 67'; Ceccaroni 71'; Segre 80'; Graves (yellow card) 84'; Vasic (yellow card) 89'	Report	Acampora (yellow card) 26'; Pucino (yellow card) 73'	Stadium: Renzo Barbera; Attendance: 23,392; Referee: Paride Tremolada

10 February 2024 24	Feralpisalò	1–2	Palermo	Piacenza
14:00 CET (UTC+1)	Di Molfetta (yellow card) 60'; Dubickas 90+1'	Report	Di Mariano (yellow card) 43'; Nedelcearu (yellow card) 49'; Ranocchia (yellow card) 57' (goal) 68'; Soleri 76'; Lund (yellow card) 83'	Stadium: Leonardo Garilli; Attendance: 3,131; Referee: Francesco Fourneau

17 February 2024 25	Palermo	3–0	Como	Palermo
16:15 CET (UTC+1)	Brunori 35'; Ranocchia 64'; Di Mariano (yellow card) 67'; Di Francesco 83'	Report	Bellemo (yellow card) 12'; Curto (yellow card) 55'; Ballet (yellow card) 88'	Stadium: Renzo Barbera; Attendance: 31,211; Referee: Gianluca Aureliano

24 February 2024 26	Cremonese	2–2	Palermo	Cremona
14:00 CET (UTC+1)	Castagnetti (yellow card) 13' (goal) 49'; Sernicola (red card) 16'; Coda 50'	Report	Brunori 18' (pen.); Di Mariano (yellow card) 22'; Ranocchia 44' (yellow card) 61'; Aurelio (yellow card) 82'	Stadium: Giovanni Zini; Attendance: 13,090; Referee: Davide Massa

27 February 2024 27	Palermo	2–3	Ternana	Palermo
20:30 CET (UTC+1)	Lund 19'; Diakité (yellow card) 67'; Ranocchia (yellow card) 68'; Brunori 90+5'	Report	Pereiro 10'; Pyyhtiä 64'; Raimondo 74'; Carboni (yellow card) 76'; De Boer (yellow card) 90+5'	Stadium: Renzo Barbera; Attendance: 27,404; Referee: Kevin Bonacina

2 March 2024 28	Brescia	4–2	Palermo	Brescia
14:00 CET (UTC+1)	Borrelli 1', 41'; Paghera 30' (yellow card) 71'; Dickmann (yellow card) 34'; Di Francesco 45+1' (o.g.); Besaggio (yellow card) 68'	Report	Brunori 5' (pen.); Marconi (yellow card) 12' (red card) 23'; Di Francesco 13'; Nedelcearu (yellow card) 78'; Ceccaroni (yellow card) 90+2'	Stadium: Mario Rigamonti; Attendance: 5,317; Referee: Daniele Rutella

10 March 2024 29	Lecco	0–1	Palermo	Padua
16:15 CET (UTC+1)	Galli (yellow card) 34'	Report	Nedelcearu 36'	Stadium: Euganeo; Attendance: 4,447; Referee: Ivano Pezzuto

15 March 2024 30	Palermo	0–3	Venezia	Palermo
20:30 CET (UTC+1)	Ceccaroni (yellow card) 63'	Report	Pohjanpalo 18', 30'; Altare (yellow card) 61'; Gytkjær 90+2'	Stadium: Renzo Barbera; Attendance: 27,058; Referee: Daniele Doveri

1 April 2024 31	Pisa	4–3	Palermo	Pisa
15:00 CEST (UTC+2)	Barbieri (yellow card) 38'; D'Alessandro 59'; Bonfanti 63'; Calabresi (yellow card) 64'; Caracciolo (yellow card) 67'; Tramoni 84', 90'	Report	Gomes (yellow card) 4' (yellow-red card) 64'; Coulibaly (yellow card) 14'; Brunori 32', 76' (pen.); Lund 42'	Stadium: Arena Garibaldi; Attendance: 8,141; Referee: Francesco Fourneau

6 April 2024 32	Palermo	2–2	Sampdoria	Palermo
16:15 CEST (UTC+2)	Brunori 23' (pen.); Mancuso 27'; Lucioni (yellow card) 33'; Di Mariano (yellow card) 33'	Report	Leoni 19'; Barreca (yellow card) 43'; Darboe 61'	Stadium: Renzo Barbera; Attendance: 23,372; Referee: Antonio Giua

13 April 2024 33	Cosenza	1–1	Palermo	Cosenza
16:15 CEST (UTC+2)	Tutino 62' (pen.); Calò (yellow card) 77'; Florenzi (yellow card) 86'	Report	Buttaro 44'	Stadium: San Vito-Gigi Marulla; Attendance: 6,363; Referee: Livio Marinelli

19 April 2024 34	Palermo	0–0	Parma	Palermo
20:30 CEST (UTC+2)	Diakité (yellow card) 42'; Gomes (yellow card) 90+4'	Report	Osorio (yellow card) 37'; Bernabé (yellow card) 78'	Stadium: Renzo Barbera; Attendance: 21,120; Referee: Gianluca Aureliano

27 April 2024 35	Palermo	1–2	Reggiana	Palermo
16:15 CEST (UTC+2)	Brunori 35'; Henderson (yellow card) 51'	Report	Libutti (yellow card) 32'; Marcandalli (yellow card) 43'; Portanova 52'; Rozzio 66'	Stadium: Renzo Barbera; Attendance: 20,601; Referee: Daniele Perenzoni

1 May 2024 36	Spezia	1–0	Palermo	La Spezia
15:00 CEST (UTC+2)	Di Serio 16' (yellow card) 74'; F. Esposito (yellow card) 29'; Vignali (yellow card) 65'	Report	Ranocchia (yellow card) 70'; Mancuso (yellow card) 87'; Di Francesco (yellow card) 90'; Henderson (yellow card) 90+6'	Stadium: Alberto Picco; Attendance: 7,160; Referee: Ivano Pezzuto

5 May 2024 37	Palermo	2–2	Ascoli	Palermo
15:00 CEST (UTC+2)	Brunori 1'; Diakité (yellow card) 16'; Soleri 34'; Henderson (yellow card) 73'; Lucioni (yellow card) 90'	Report	Caligara 27', 90+3'; Di Tacchio (yellow card) 45+1'	Stadium: Renzo Barbera; Attendance: 18,308; Referee: Marco Di Bello

10 May 2024 38	Südtirol	0–1	Palermo	Bolzano
20:30 CEST (UTC+2)	Kofler (yellow card) 19'; Merkaj (yellow card) 21'; Vinetot (yellow card) 74'; Molina (yellow card) 84'; Davì (red card) 86'	Report	Nedelcearu (yellow card) 52'; Lucioni (yellow card) 59'; Diakité 64'; Soleri (yellow card) 90+5'	Stadium: Druso; Attendance: 5,221; Referee: Maria Sole Ferrieri Caputi

=== Promotion play-offs ===
==== Preliminary round ====
17 May 2024 Preliminary round	Palermo	2–0	Sampdoria	Palermo
20:30 CEST (UTC+2)	Diakité 43', 47'; Desplanches (yellow card) 70'; Lund (yellow card) 86'	Report	Depaoli (yellow card) 45+3'; Stojanović (yellow card) 86'	Stadium: Renzo Barbera; Attendance: 32,730; Referee: Andrea Colombo

==== Semi-finals ====
20 May 2024 First leg	Palermo	0–1	Venezia	Palermo
20:30 CEST (UTC+2)	Lucioni (yellow card) 33'; Diakité (yellow card) 64'	Report	Pierini 62'; Bjarkason (yellow card) 64'; Idzes (yellow card) 64'; Candela (yellow card) 71'; Busio (yellow card) 76'; Lella (yellow card) 77'	Stadium: Renzo Barbera; Attendance: 32,753; Referee: Antonio Giua

24 May 2024 Second leg	Venezia	2–1 (3–1 agg.)	Palermo	Venice
20:30 CEST (UTC+2)	Tessmann 4' (yellow card) 42'; Joronen (yellow card) 27'; Candela 43'; Zampano (yellow card) 72'	Report	Graves (yellow card) 10'; Svoboda 86' (o.g.); Di Francesco (yellow card) 73'	Stadium: Pier Luigi Penzo; Attendance: 10,493; Referee: Luca Pairetto

=== Coppa Italia ===
12 August 2023 Round of 64	Cagliari	2–1 (a.e.t.)	Palermo	Cagliari
21:15 CEST (UTC+2)	Pavoletti (penalty missed) 23'; Oristanio (yellow card) 32'; Dossena (yellow card) 89' (goal) 100'; Di Pardo 120+3'	Report	Gomes (yellow card) 11'; Vasic (yellow card) 73'; Soleri 120+1'; Mateju (yellow card) 120+3'	Stadium: Unipol Domus; Attendance: 14,917; Referee: Livio Marinelli

=== Appearances and goals ===
No.	Pos.	Name	Serie B		Play-offs		Coppa Italia		Total	
No.	Pos.	Name		Goal		Goal		Goal		Goal
1	GK	(Italy) Sebastiano Desplanches	2	0	2	0	—		4	0
2	DF	(Denmark) Simon Graves	12	1	3	0	—		15	1
3	DF	(United States) Kristoffer Lund	35	2	2	0	—		37	2
4	MF	(France) Claudio Gomes	34	0	2	0	1	0	37	0
5	DF	(Italy) Fabio Lucioni	23	2	3	0	1	0	27	2
6	MF	(Slovenia) Leo Štulac	21	4	—		1	0	22	4
7	FW	(Italy) Leonardo Mancuso	26	4	2	0	1	0	29	4
8	MF	(Italy) Jacopo Segre	34	7	3	0	1	0	38	7
9	FW	(Italy) Matteo Brunori	37	17	3	0	1	0	41	17
10	FW	(Italy) Francesco Di Mariano	27	0	2	0	1	0	30	0
11	FW	(Italy) Roberto Insigne	24	2	3	0	1	0	28	2
12	GK	(Italy) Manfredi Nespola	—		—		—		0	0
13	GK	(Bosnia and Herzegovina) Adnan Kanurić	—		—		—		0	0
14	MF	(Italy) Filippo Ranocchia	12	4	3	0	—		15	4
15	DF	(Italy) Ivan Marconi	10	0	3	0	1	0	14	0
17	FW	(Italy) Federico Di Francesco	33	5	3	0	—		36	5
18	DF	(Romania) Ionuț Nedelcearu	20	2	1	0	—		21	2
20	MF	(Serbia) Aljosa Vasic	19	0	—		1	0	20	0
21	MF	(Italy) Samuele Damiani	—		—		1	0	1	0
22	GK	(Italy) Mirko Pigliacelli	36	0	1	0	1	0	38	0
23	MF	(Bosnia and Herzegovina) Dario Šarić	1	0	—		1	0	2	0
23	DF	(France) Salim Diakité	15	1	3	2	—		18	3
25	DF	(Italy) Alessio Buttaro	10	1	—		—		10	1
27	FW	(Italy) Edoardo Soleri	29	5	3	0	1	1	33	6
30	FW	(Italy) Nicola Valente	10	0	—		1	0	11	0
31	DF	(Italy) Giuseppe Aurelio	26	1	1	0	—		27	1
32	DF	(Italy) Pietro Ceccaroni	29	2	1	0	1	0	31	2
37	DF	(Czech Republic) Aleš Matějů	17	0	—		1	0	18	0
53	MF	(Scotland) Liam Henderson	30	1	1	0	—		31	1
70	FW	(Ivory Coast) Chaka Traorè	10	0	2	0	—		12	0
80	MF	(Senegal) Mamadou Coulibaly	19	1	—		—		19	1
Own goals			—		—	1	—		–	1
Totals			–	62	–	3	–	1	–	66

=== Disciplinary record ===
No.	Pos.	Name	Serie B			Play-offs			Coppa Italia			Total		
No.	Pos.	Name	Yellow card	(yellow card) (yellow-red card)	Red card	Yellow card	(yellow card) (yellow-red card)	Red card	Yellow card	(yellow card) (yellow-red card)	Red card	Yellow card	(yellow card) (yellow-red card)	Red card
1	GK	(Italy) Sebastiano Desplanches	—			1	0	0	—			1	0	0
2	DF	(Denmark) Simon Graves	2	0	0	1	0	0	—			3	0	0
3	DF	(United States) Kristoffer Lund	3	0	0	1	0	0	—			4	0	0
4	MF	(France) Claudio Gomes	3	1	0	—			1	0	0	4	1	0
5	DF	(Italy) Fabio Lucioni	7	0	0	1	0	0	—			8	0	0
6	MF	(Slovenia) Leo Štulac	3	1	0	—			—			3	1	0
7	FW	(Italy) Leonardo Mancuso	1	0	0	—			—			1	0	0
8	MF	(Italy) Jacopo Segre	3	0	0	—			—			3	0	0
9	FW	(Italy) Matteo Brunori	5	0	0	—			—			5	0	0
10	FW	(Italy) Francesco Di Mariano	5	0	0	—			—			5	0	0
11	FW	(Italy) Roberto Insigne	1	0	0	—			—			1	0	0
14	DF	(Italy) Filippo Ranocchia	5	0	0	—			—			5	0	0
15	DF	(Italy) Ivan Marconi	3	0	2	—			—			3	0	2
17	FW	(Italy) Federico Di Francesco	4	0	0	1	0	0	—			5	0	0
18	DF	(Romania) Ionuț Nedelcearu	5	0	0	—			—			5	0	0
20	MF	(Serbia) Aljosa Vasic	2	0	0	—			1	0	0	3	0	0
23	DF	(France) Salim Diakité	3	0	0	1	0	0	—			4	0	0
25	DF	(Italy) Alessio Buttaro	1	0	0	—			—			1	0	0
27	FW	(Italy) Edoardo Soleri	3	0	0	—			—			3	0	0
30	FW	(Italy) Nicola Valente	2	0	0	—			—			2	0	0
31	DF	(Italy) Giuseppe Aurelio	3	0	0	—			—			3	0	0
32	DF	(Italy) Pietro Ceccaroni	4	0	0	—			—			4	0	0
37	DF	(Czech Republic) Ales Mateju	5	0	0	—			—			5	0	0
53	MF	(Scotland) Liam Henderson	3	0	0	—			—			3	0	0
80	MF	(Senegal) Mamadou Coulibaly	5	0	0	—			—			5	0	0
Totals			81	2	2	6	0	0	2	0	0	89	2	2

=== Goals conceded and clean sheets ===
No.	Pos.	Name	Serie B		Play-offs		Coppa Italia		Total	
No.	Pos.	Name	Goal		Goal		Goal		Goal	
1	GK	(Italy) Sebastiano Desplanches	2	1	1	1	—		3	2
22	GK	(Italy) Mirko Pigliacelli	51	9	2	0	2	0	55	9
Totals			53	10	3	1	2	0	58	11

=== Attendances ===
	Matches	Attendances	Average	Highest	Lowest
Serie B	19	431,619	22,717	31,211	16,279
Play-offs	2	65,483	32,742	32,753	32,730
Coppa Italia	–				
Totals	21	497,102	23,672	32,753	16,279
