= Cardamone =

Cardamone is a surname. Notable people with the surname include:

- Agostino Cardamone (born 1965), Italian boxer
- MF Cardamone (born 1958), American artist
- Richard J. Cardamone (1925–2015), American jurist
- Tom Cardamone (born 1969), American writer
- Valerio Cardamone (born 1999), Italian footballer
