= Luis Maldonado =

Luis Maldonado may refer to:

- Luis Maldonado (bishop) (died 1596), Roman Catholic bishop of Nueva Cáceres
- Luis Maldonado Boggiano (1907–1998), Chilean lawyer and Supreme Court justice
- Luis Maldonado (footballer, born 1985), Uruguayan footballer
- Luis Maldonado (footballer, born 1996), Ecuadorian footballer
- Luis Maldonado (musician), American member of Train and Foreigner
- Luis Maldonado (politician) (born 1954), Puerto Rican politician, mayor of Ciales
- Luis Maldonado Venegas (1956–2019), Mexican politician
