= Jacopo Segre =

Italian footballer

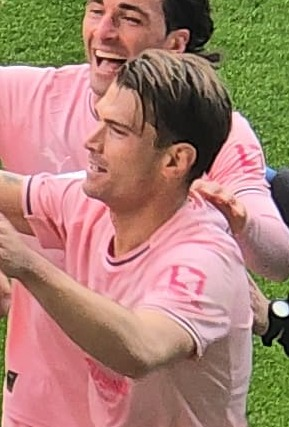
- Segre in 2026 with Palermo

Personal information
- Date of birth: 17 February 1997 (age 29)
- Place of birth: Turin, Italy
- Height: 1.85 m (6 ft 1 in)
- Position: Midfielder

Team information
- Current team: Palermo
- Number: 8

Youth career
- –2015: Milan
- 2015–2016: Torino

Senior career*
Years	Team	Apps	(Gls)
2016–2022	Torino	10	(0)
2016–2017	→ Piacenza (loan)	11	(2)
2017–2018	→ Piacenza (loan)	36	(3)
2018–2019	→ Venezia (loan)	29	(3)
2019–2020	→ Chievo (loan)	37	(3)
2021	→ SPAL (loan)	18	(1)
2021–2022	→ Perugia (loan)	36	(1)
2022–	Palermo	139	(18)
- * Club domestic league appearances and goals as of 12 May 2026

Jacopo Segre (born 17 February 1997) is an Italian professional footballer who plays as a midfielder for Serie B club Palermo.

== Club career ==
=== Torino ===
==== Loan to Piacenza ====
On 18 July 2016, Segre was loaned to Serie C side Piacenza on a season-long loan deal. On 7 November he made his professional debut for Piacenza in Serie C as a substitute replacing Luca Matteassi in the 91st minute of a 3–1 home win over Como. On 23 December he scored his first professional goal, as a substitute, in the 83rd minute of a 2–1 home defeat against Lucchese. One week later he played his first entire match for Piacenza, a 1–1 away draw against Lupa Roma. On 4 April 2017, Segre scored his second goal for the team in the 90th minute of a 3–2 away defeat against Giana Erminio. Segre ended his loan to Piacenza with only 11 appearances and 2 goals.

On 3 August 2017, Segre returned to Piacenza with another season-long loan. On 10 September he played his first match of the new season with Piacenza as a substitute replacing Alex Pederzoli after only 4 minutes of a 1–1 away draw against Olbia. On 27 October he played his first entire match of the season for Piacenza, a 0–0 home draw against Pisa. On 8 November, Segre scored his first goal in the 11th minute of a 4–3 away defeat against Giana Erminio. Four days later, he scored his second consecutive goal in the 18th minute of a 1–1 home draw against Carrarese. On 21 April 2018, Segre scored his third goal in the 80th minute of a 2–0 home win over Pro Piacenza. Segre ended his second loan to Piacenza with 36 appearances, 3 goals and 1 assist.

==== Loan to Venezia ====
On 5 July 2018, Segre was loaned to Serie B side Venezia on a season-long deal. On 5 August he made his debut for Venezia as a substitute replacing Andrea Schiavone in the 81st minute of a 1–0 home defeat against Südtirol in the second round of Coppa Italia. On 22 September he made his Serie B debut for Venezia as a 75th-minute substitute replacing Sergiu Suciu in a 2–1 away defeat against Lecce. On 6 October, Segre played his first match as a starter, a 1–0 away defeat against Perugia, he was replaced by Davide Marsura in the 85th minute. On 26 October he scored his first goal in Serie B for Venezia, as a substitute, in the 59th minute of a 1–1 away draw against Palermo. Four days later he played his first entire match for Venezia, a 1–0 away win over Cremonese. On 27 January 2019, Segre scored his second goal in the 5th minute of a 2–1 home win over Padova. One month later he scored his third in the 38th minute of a 3–2 home defeat against Perugia. Segre ended his loan to Venezia with 31 appearances, 3 goals and 1 assist.

==== Loan to Chievo ====
On 23 August 2019, Segre was loaned to Serie B club Chievo on a season-long loan with an option to buy. On 25 August he made his debut for ChievoVerona as a substitute replacing Manuel Pucciarelli in the 58th minute of a 2–1 away defeat against Perugia. Five days later, on 30 August he played his first entire match for the club, a 1–1 home draw against Empoli. On 21 September, Segre scored his first goal for the club in the 69th minute of a 2–2 home draw against Pisa. On 5 October he scored his second goal for the club in the 89th minute of a 4–3 away win over Livorno. Segre ended his season-long loan to ChievoVerona with 40 appearances, 37 of them as a starter, 4 goals and 4 assists, he also helps the club to reach the play-off semi-finals, however Chievo lost 3–3 on aggregate against Spezia.

==== Loan to SPAL ====
On 1 February 2021, Segre was loaned to Serie B side SPAL until the end of the season. The deal includes an obligation to buy if certain conditions are achieved.

==== Loan to Perugia ====
On 31 August 2021, Segre joined Perugia on loan with option an obligation to buy.

=== Palermo ===
On 23 August 2022, Serie B club Palermo signed Segre from Torino on a three-year permanent deal, with youth team striker Giacomo Corona moving to the Granata as part of the deal.

== Career statistics ==
=== Club ===
As of match played 1 November 2025

Appearances and goals by club, season and competition
Club	Season	League			Cup		Europe		Other		Total	
Club	Season	Division	Apps	Goals	Apps	Goals	Apps	Goals	Apps	Goals	Apps	Goals
Piacenza (loan)	2016–17	Serie C	11	2	0	0	—		—		11	2
Piacenza (loan)	2017–18	Serie C	32	3	0	0	—		4 (Note: All appearance(s) in Serie C play-off.)	0	36	3
Piacenza (loan)	Total		43	5	0	0	—		4	0	47	5
Venezia (loan)	2018–19	Serie B	29	3	1	0	—		1 (Note: All appearance(s) in Serie B play-out.)	0	31	3
Chievo (loan)	2019–20	Serie B	37	3	0	0	—		3 (Note: All appearance(s) in Serie B play-off.)	1	40	3
Torino	2020–21	Serie A	9	0	3	0	—		—		12	0
SPAL (loan)	2020–21	Serie B	18	1	—		—		—		18	1
Torino	2021–22	Serie A	0	0	1	0	—		—		1	0
Perugia (loan)	2021–22	Serie B	36	1	—		—		1	0	37	1
Torino	2022–23	Serie A	1	0	1	0	—		—		2	0
Palermo	2022–23	Serie B	34	4	—		—		—		34	4
Palermo	2023–24	Serie B	34	7	1	0	—		3	0	38	7
Palermo	2024–25	Serie B	34	3	1	0	—		1	0	36	3
Palermo	2025–26	Serie B	11	2	2	0	—		—		13	2
Palermo	Total		113	16	4	0	0	0	4	0	121	16
Career total			286	29	10	0	—		13	1	309	30

== Honours ==
=== Club ===
Torino

- Supercoppa Primavera: 2015
