= Edoardo Soleri =

Italian footballer (born 1997)

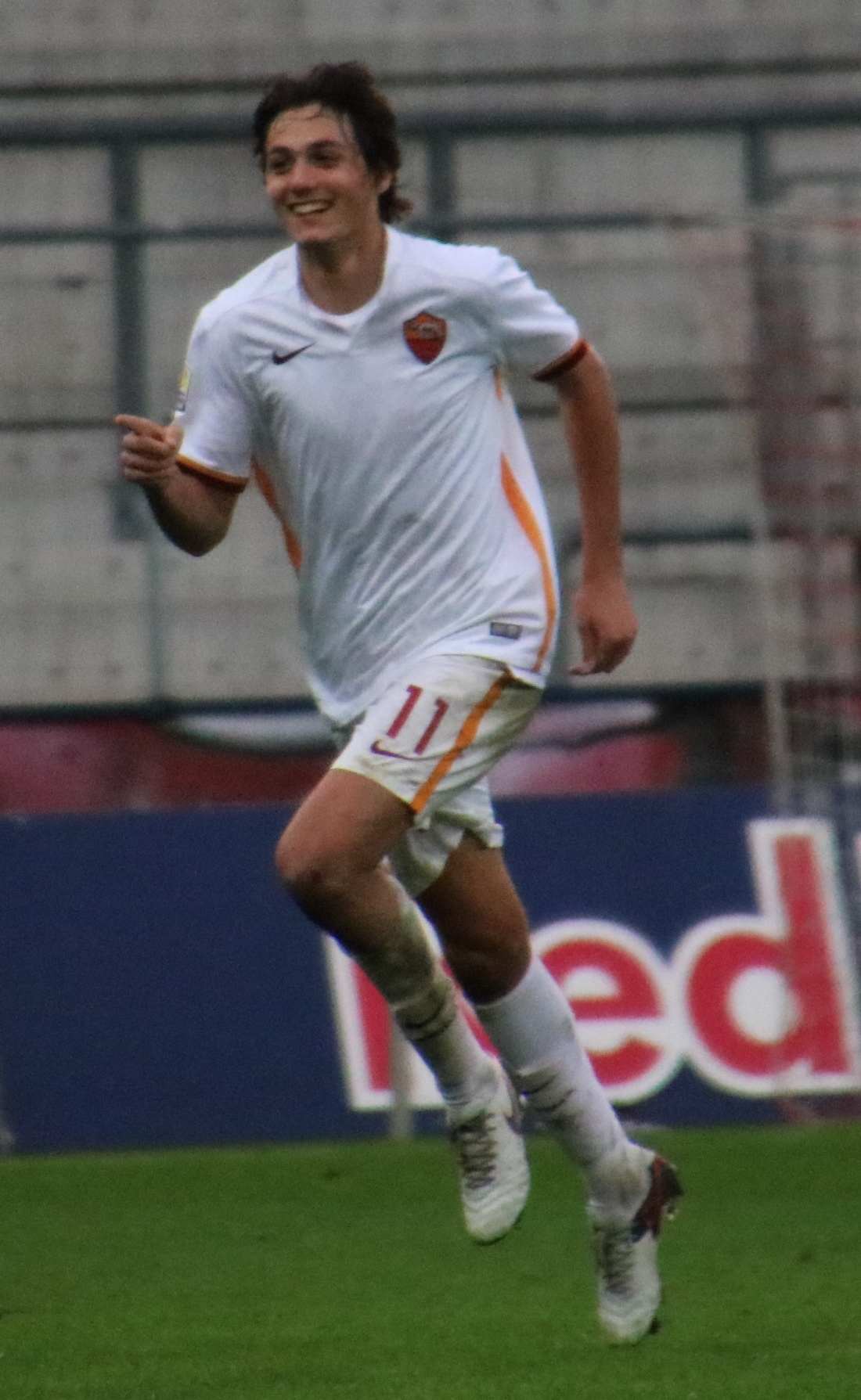

Personal information
- Date of birth: 19 October 1997 (age 29)
- Place of birth: Rome, Italy
- Height: 1.94 m (6 ft 4 in)
- Position: Forward

Youth career
- SSD Futbolclub
- 2013–2016: Roma

Senior career*
Years	Team	Apps	(Gls)
2015–2019	Roma	0	(0)
2017	→ Spezia (loan)	5	(0)
2018	→ Almería (loan)	11	(2)
2018–2019	→ Almere City (loan)	13	(5)
2018	→ Almere City U21 (loan)	1	(0)
2019	→ Braga B (loan)	3	(0)
2019–2022	Padova	30	(3)
2021	→ Monopoli (loan)	18	(3)
2021–2022	→ Palermo (loan)	35	(10)
2022–2024	Palermo	58	(9)
2024–2026	Spezia	37	(4)
2026	→ Sampdoria (loan)	13	(0)

International career
2015–2016	Italy U19	5	(1)
- * Club domestic league appearances and goals as of 13 May 2026

Edoardo Soleri (born 19 October 1997) is an Italian professional footballer who plays as a forward.

== Club career ==
Born in Rome, Soleri joined Roma's youth setup in 2013, from SSD Futbolclub. He was subsequently included in the Primavera squad, and also featured in the 2015–16 and 2016–17 UEFA Youth Leagues.

Soleri made his professional debut on 29 September 2015, coming on as a late substitute for Alessandro Florenzi in a 3–2 away loss against BATE Borisov, for the season's UEFA Champions League.

On 30 June 2017, after finishing his formation, Soleri was loaned to Serie B side Spezia for one year. He made his debut for the club on 12 August, playing the last 24 minutes in a 2–0 Coppa Italia away loss against Sassuolo.

On 19 January 2018, Soleri's loan was cut short after only five league appearances. The following day, he joined Spanish Segunda División side UD Almería on loan until June.

In July 2018, Soleri signed to Eerste Divisie club Almere City on loan.

In January 2019, Soleri signed to Braga on loan until the end of the season.

On 10 July 2019, Soleri signed a three-year contract with Serie C club Padova. On 6 January 2021, he joined Monopoli on loan.

On 16 July 2021, he was loaned to Palermo. In his time at Palermo, he became the second-best goalscorer behind Matteo Brunori, marking a total ten goals in the regular season, all of them as a substitute. He confirmed his "super-sub" reputation by scoring the first of two Palermo goals in the promotion playoff quarter-final second leg against Virtus Entella, a 2–2 home draw that allowed the Sicilians to qualify for the semifinals, as well as scoring the final goal in a 3–0 away win at Feralpisalò in the semifinal first leg.

On 16 June 2022, Palermo exercised their option to make the transfer permanent. Later in August 2022, Soleri signed a contract extension until 30 June 2025 with the Rosanero. On 5 February 2023, he scored his first career goal in the Serie B league, the winning one in a 2–1 home win against third-placed Reggina.

On 14 July 2024, Soleri left Palermo to sign for fellow Serie B club Spezia.

On 2 February 2026, Soleri joined Sampdoria from Spezia as part of a deal in which midfielder Alessandro Bellemo moved the other way. He joined Sampdoria on loan with an option to buy, and signed a contract until 30 June 2028 which would be in place if the option is exercised.

On 1 September 2026, Soleri terminated his contract with Spezia by mutual consent.

== Career statistics ==
=== Club ===
As of 21 January 2024

Appearances and goals by club, season and competition
Club	Season	League			National cup		Continental		Other		Total	
Club	Season	Division	Apps	Goals	Apps	Goals	Apps	Goals	Apps	Goals	Apps	Goals
Roma	2015–16	Serie A	0	0	0	0	1 (Note: All appearance(s) in UEFA Champions League.)	0	—		1	0
Roma	2016–17	Serie A	0	0	0	0	0	0	—		0	0
Roma	Total		0	0	0	0	1	0	0	0	1	0
Spezia (loan)	2017–18	Serie B	5	0	1	0	—		—		6	0
Almería (loan)	2017–18	Segunda División	11	2	0	0	—		—		11	2
Almere City (loan)	2018–19	Eerste Divisie	13	5	2	0	—		—		15	5
Almere City U21 (loan)	2018–19	Tweede Divisie	1	0	—		—		—		1	0
Braga B (loan)	2018–19	LigaPro	3	0	0	0	—		—		3	0
Padova	2019–20	Serie C	19	3	1	0	—		3 (Note: All appearance(s) in promotion play-offs.)	0	23	3
Padova	2020–21	Serie C	11	0	3	1	—		—		14	1
Padova	Total		30	3	4	1	0	0	3	0	37	4
Monopoli (loan)	2020–21	Serie C	18	3	—		—		—		18	3
Palermo (loan)	2021–22	Serie C	35	10	3	0	—		8	2	46	12
Palermo	2022–23	Serie B	29	4	2	0	–		–		31	4
Palermo	2023–24	Serie B	14	3	1	1	–		–		15	4
Palermo	Total		43	7	3	1	0	0	0	0	46	8
Career total			159	30	13	2	1	0	11	2	184	34
