= Fabio Gavazzi =

Italian footballer (born 1988)

Personal information
- Date of birth: 4 April 1988 (age 38)
- Place of birth: Seriate, Italy
- Height: 1.82 m (6 ft 0 in)
- Position: Centre-back

Senior career*
Years	Team	Apps	(Gls)
2007–2009	Como	17	(0)
2009–2010	Alghero	13	(0)
2010	Pro Sesto	8	(0)
2010–2015	Renate	114	(5)
2015–2016	Novara	16	(0)
2015–2016	→ Mantova (loan)	10	(0)
2016	→ Südtirol (loan)	3	(0)
2016–2020	AlbinoLeffe	129	(3)
2020–2021	Foggia	33	(1)
2021–2024	Vis Pesaro	63	(1)
2023–2024	→ Virtus Francavilla (loan)	7	(0)
- * Club domestic league appearances and goals as of 5 May 2024

Fabio Gavazzi (born 4 April 1988) is an Italian footballer who plays as a defender.

== Career ==
On 2 October 2020 he joined Foggia. On 9 July 2021, his contract with Foggia was terminated by mutual consent.

On 13 July 2021 he signed with Vis Pesaro.

On 10 August 2023, Gavazzi joined Virtus Francavilla on loan.

On 30 July 2024, Gavazzi's contract with Vis Pesaro was terminated by mutual consent.
