= Nicola Turi =

Italian footballer

Personal information
- Date of birth: 5 February 1998 (age 28)
- Place of birth: Bari, Italy
- Height: 1.82 m (5 ft 11 1/2 in)
- Position: Defender

Team information
- Current team: Chiasso
- Number: 28

Youth career
- –2016: Bari

Senior career*
Years	Team	Apps	(Gls)
2016–2019	Bari	14	(0)
2017	→ Vicenza (loan)	2	(0)
2019–2020	Bisceglie	24	(0)
2021	Foggia	1	(0)
2022	Taranto	2	(0)
2022–	Chiasso	5	(0)
- * Club domestic league appearances and goals as of 24 September 2022

Nicola Turi (born 5 February 1998) is an Italian football player who plays for Swiss club Chiasso.

== Club career ==
He made his Serie C debut for Vicenza on 4 October 2017 in a game against Fano.

On 30 July 2019, he joined Bisceglie.

On 29 January 2022, he signed with Taranto until the end of the season.

On 11 July 2022, Turi moved to Chiasso in the third-tier Swiss Promotion League.
