= Matteo Brunori =

Italian footballer (born 1994)

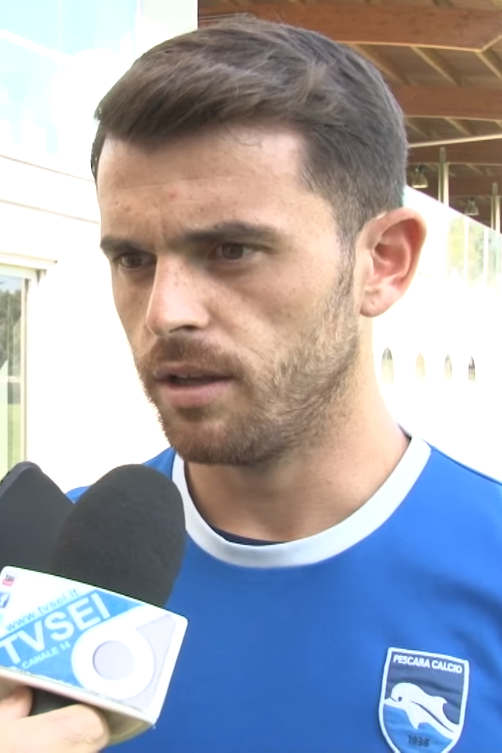
- Brunori in 2019

Personal information
- Full name: Matteo Luigi Brunori
- Birth name: Matteo Luigi Brunori Sandri
- Date of birth: 1 November 1994 (age 32)
- Place of birth: Macaé, Brazil
- Height: 1.80 m (5 ft 11 in)
- Position: Forward

Team information
- Current team: Ascoli (on loan from Palermo)
- Number: 99

Youth career
- –2012: Foligno
- 2012: → Reggina (loan)

Senior career*
| Years | Team | Apps | (Gls) |
| 2011–2013 | Foligno | 23 | (0) |
| 2013–2015 | Reggiana | 12 | (0) |
| 2015 | Pro Patria | 5 | (0) |
| 2015–2016 | Petrignano | | (19) |
| 2016 | Messina | 0 | (0) |
| 2016–2017 | Petrignano | | (21) |
| 2017–2018 | Villabiagio | 34 | (23) |
| 2018–2020 | Parma | 0 | (0) |
| 2018–2019 | → Arezzo (loan) | 36 | (13) |
| 2019–2020 | → Pescara (loan) | 10 | (0) |
| 2020 | Pescara | 0 | (0) |
| 2020 | Juventus U23 | 4 | (1) |
| 2020–2022 | Juventus | 0 | (0) |
| 2020–2021 | → Entella (loan) | 31 | (3) |
| 2021–2022 | → Palermo (loan) | 36 | (25) |
| 2022– | Palermo | 117 | (44) |
| 2026 | → Sampdoria (loan) | 18 | (3) |
| 2026– | → Ascoli (loan) | 4 | (1) |

International career
| 2014–2015 | Italy U21 C | 3 | (0) |
- * Club domestic league appearances and goals as of 13 May 2026

Matteo Luigi Brunori (Italian pronunciation: [matˈtɛːo luˈiːdʒi bruˈnɔːri]; born Matteo Luigi Brunori Sandri on 1 November 1994) is a professional footballer who plays as a forward for Serie B club Ascoli, on loan from Palermo.

== Club career ==
=== Early years ===
Brunori made his Serie C debut for Foligno on 5 June 2011, in a game against Ternana.

On 1 August 2019, he joined Pescara on loan from Parma with an obligation to buy.

On 24 January 2020, Pescara bought out his rights early and immediately re-sold him to Juventus U23.

On 24 August 2020, he became a new Entella player on loan with an option to buy.

=== Palermo ===
On 9 August 2021, he joined Palermo on loan. He made his debut with rosanero in a Coppa Italia Serie C game on 21 August 2021, which Palermo won 4–1 against Picerno. On 26 September, Brunori scored his first goal in a 1–1 away draw against Monterosi Tuscia. On 6 February 2022, he scored both of Palermo's goals in a 2–2 away against Campobasso, which allowed him to break the 10-goal barrier.

Brunori scored another brace in the following home match, which Palermo won 3–1 against Juve Stabia. With his goal against Turris, he surpassed his personal-best tally of 13 goals, which he had reached in the 2018–2019 season with Arezzo, and surpassed Lorenzo Lucca as top scorer of Palermo in Serie C. On 6 March, he scoring a goal in a win against Vibonese, reaching Şükrü Gülesin as player with more consecutive goals scored for Palermo (7). Brunori broke the record in the next match against Avellino.

On 24 April, in the last league match against Bari, Brunori scored one of the two goals that allowed Palermo to qualify for the play-offs. The following 10 June, he won the "Trofeo Facco" for the best goal of 2021–22 Serie C.

In the play-offs, Brunori contributed to the final promotion of Palermo, scoring four goals in 8 games, against Virtus Entella, Feralpisalò (2 goals) and Padova, in the final.

On 17 July 2022, a couple of weeks after the end of the loan deal, Palermo announced that it had permanently signed Brunori from Juventus, agreeing on a four-year contract with the striker. On his debut as a permanent Palermo player, Brunori scored his first hat-trick with a Rosanero jersey in a 3–2 Coppa Italia home win against Reggiana. On 6 June 2023, after captaining Palermo and scoring 17 goals on his first Serie B season with the Sicilians, Brunori signed a contract extension until 30 June 2027.

On 3 January 2026, after having been increasingly put out of the starting lineup by head coach Filippo Inzaghi in favour of other options, Brunori was loaned out to fellow Serie B club Sampdoria until the end of the season.

On 26 August 2026, Brunori was loaned out to Serie B club Ascoli until the end of the season.

== International career ==
On 15 December 2022, Brunori was called up by Italy national team manager Roberto Mancini as part of the 69-player squad of "players of national interest" for a stage in Coverciano to be held from 20 to 22 December.

== Personal life ==
Born in Brazil to Italian parents, Brunori moved back to Assisi with his family at one year of age. He was raised by his mother alone, and later changed his full surname from "Brunori Sandri" to just "Brunori", choosing to keep only his mother's surname.

On 11 June 2022, just two days before Palermo's promotion playoff final against Padova, Brunori married his long-time partner Dalila at the Castello di Naro, in the city of Cagli; the marriage was originally scheduled to be held in 2020 but was then postponed due to the COVID-19 pandemic in Italy.

== Career statistics ==
=== Club ===
As of match played 7 February 2026

Appearances and goals by club, season and competition
| Club | Season | League | | | Coppa Italia | | Other | | Total | |
| Club | Season | Division | Apps | Goals | Apps | Goals | Apps | Goals | Apps | Goals |
|---|---|---|---|---|---|---|---|---|---|---|
| Foligno | 2010–11 | Lega Pro D1 | 0 | 0 | 0 | 0 | 1 (Note: All appearance(s) in relegation play-outs.) | 0 | 1 | 0 |
| Foligno | 2011–12 | Lega Pro D1 | 10 | 0 | 3 | 1 | — | | 13 | 1 |
| Foligno | 2012–13 | Lega Pro D2 | 13 | 0 | 1 | 0 | — | | 14 | 0 |
| Foligno | Total | | 23 | 0 | 4 | 1 | 1 | 0 | 28 | 1 |
| Reggiana | 2013–14 | Lega Pro D1 | 9 | 0 | 2 | 1 | — | | 11 | 1 |
| Reggiana | 2014–15 | Lega Pro | 3 | 0 | 1 | 0 | — | | 4 | 0 |
| Reggiana | Total | | 12 | 0 | 3 | 1 | 0 | 0 | 15 | 1 |
| Pro Patria | 2014–15 | Lega Pro | 5 | 0 | 0 | 0 | 0 | 0 | 5 | 0 |
| Petrignano | 2015–16 | Eccellenza | 17+ | 19 | | 0 | — | | 17+ | 19 |
| Messina | 2016–17 | Lega Pro | 0 | 0 | 1 | 0 | — | | 1 | 0 |
| Petrignano | 2016–17 | Eccellenza | 16+ | 21 | | 0 | — | | 16+ | 21 |
| Villabiagio | 2017–18 | Serie D | 34 | 23 | 2 | 0 | — | | 36 | 23 |
| Arezzo (loan) | 2018–19 | Serie C | 36 | 13 | 2 | 0 | 5 (Note: All appearance(s) in promotion play-offs.) | 4 | 43 | 17 |
| Pescara (loan) | 2019–20 | Serie B | 10 | 0 | 2 | 0 | — | | 12 | 0 |
| Juventus U23 | 2019–20 | Serie C | 4 | 1 | 3 | 1 | 2 | 0 | 9 | 2 |
| Virtus Entella (loan) | 2020–21 | Serie B | 31 | 3 | 3 | 1 | — | | 34 | 4 |
| Palermo (loan) | 2021–22 | Serie C | 36 | 25 | 3 | 0 | 8 | 4 | 47 | 29 |
| Palermo | 2022–23 | Serie B | 36 | 17 | 2 | 3 | 0 | 0 | 38 | 20 |
| Palermo | 2023–24 | Serie B | 37 | 17 | 1 | 0 | 3 | 0 | 41 | 17 |
| Palermo | 2024–25 | Serie B | 33 | 9 | 2 | 0 | 1 | 0 | 36 | 9 |
| Palermo | 2025–26 | Serie B | 11 | 1 | 2 | 0 | 0 | 0 | 13 | 1 |
| Palermo | Total | | 117 | 44 | 7 | 3 | 4 | 0 | 128 | 47 |
| Sampdoria (loan) | 2025–26 | Serie B | 5 | 1 | 0 | 0 | 0 | 0 | 5 | 1 |
| Career total | | | 341+ | 146 | 30+ | 7 | 20 | 8 | 392+ | 161 |

== Honours ==
Juventus U23

- Coppa Italia Serie C: 2019–20
