= Kristoffer Lund =

Professional soccer player (born 2002)

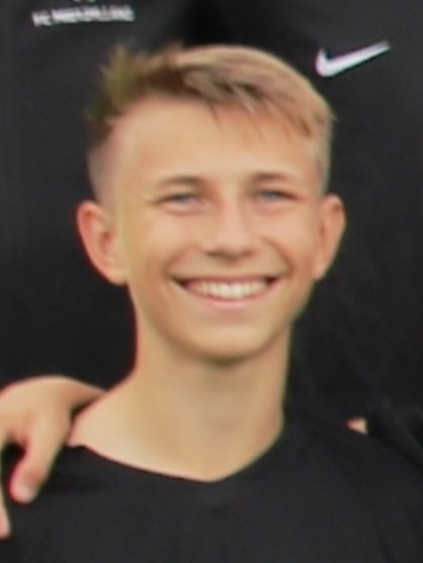

Personal information
- Full name: Kristoffer Lund Hansen
- Date of birth: May 14, 2002 (age 24)
- Place of birth: Kerteminde, Denmark
- Height: 6 ft 0 in (1.84 m)
- Position: Left-back

Team information
- Current team: Birmingham City
- Number: 25

Youth career
- 2011–2015: Kerteminde
- 2015–2020: Midtjylland

Senior career*
Years	Team	Apps	(Gls)
2020–2021	Midtjylland	1	(0)
2021	Esbjerg fB	0	(0)
2021–2023	BK Häcken	59	(0)
2023–2026	Palermo	68	(3)
2025–2026	→ 1. FC Köln (loan)	33	(0)
2026–	Birmingham City	2	(0)

International career^{‡}
2018	Denmark U17	3	(0)
2019–2020	Denmark U18	4	(0)
2020	Denmark U19	1	(0)
2022	Denmark U20	2	(0)
2022	Denmark U21	2	(0)
2023–2024	United States	7	(0)
Medal record
Men's soccer
Representing United States
CONCACAF Nations League
Winner	2024
- * Club domestic league appearances and goals as of October 13, 2026 ‡ National team caps and goals as of October 15, 2024

Kristoffer Lund Hansen (born May 14, 2002) is a professional soccer player who plays as a left-back for EFL Championship club Birmingham City. Born in Denmark, he has represented the United States national team.

== Club career ==
=== Early career ===
Lund began playing soccer with the youth academy of Kerteminde, before joining Midtjylland's youth side at the age of 13. He signed his first professional contract with Midtjylland on May 14, 2017. He made his professional debut with them in a 2–1 Danish Cup win over Odense Boldklub on February 11, 2021. On April 21, he transferred to Esbjerg, signing a three-year contract. On August 11, before making an appearance with Esbjerg, he transferred to the Swedish club Häcken until 2024.

=== Palermo ===
On August 21, 2023, Palermo announced the signing of Lund on a four-year deal. Lund scored his first league goal in a 3–2 loss to Ternana Calcio on February 27, 2024.

==== 1. FC Köln (loan) ====
On August 5, 2025, Lund moved on loan to 1. FC Köln in Germany for the 2025–26 season.

=== Birmingham City ===
On 30 July 2026, Lund signed a 4-year contract at EFL Championship club Birmingham City for an undisclosed fee.

== International career ==
Lund was born in Denmark to a Danish father and an American mother and holds dual citizenship. He was a youth international for the Denmark national teams, having represented the country from under-17 to under-21 level.

In August 2023, Lund officially filed a one-time switch to play for the United States national team, and subsequently received his first call-up to the United States senior national team by head coach Gregg Berhalter, for two friendly matches against Uzbekistan and Oman.

Lund made his debut for the United States on September 9, 2023, when he was subbed in during a friendly match against Uzbekistan at CityPark in St. Louis.

== Career statistics ==
=== Club ===
As of match played September 19, 2026

Appearances and goals by club, season and competition
Club	Season	League			National cup (Note: Includes Danish Cup, Svenska Cupen, Coppa Italia, DFB-Pokal, FA Cup)		Continental		Other		Total	
Club	Season	Division	Apps	Goals	Apps	Goals	Apps	Goals	Apps	Goals	Apps	Goals
Midtjylland	2020–21	Danish Superliga	1	0	1	0	—		—		2	0
Esbjerg fB	2020–21	Danish 1st Division	0	0	—		—		—		0	0
BK Häcken	2021	Allsvenskan	15	0	1	0	—		—		16	0
BK Häcken	2022	Allsvenskan	25	0	3	0	—		—		28	0
BK Häcken	2023	Allsvenskan	19	0	6	0	6 (Note: Four appearances in UEFA Champions League, two appearances in UEFA Europa League)	0	—		31	0
BK Häcken	Total		59	0	10	0	6	0	—		75	0
Palermo	2023–24	Serie B	35	2	—		—		2 (Note: Appearances in promotion play-offs)	0	37	2
Palermo	2024–25	Serie B	33	1	2	0	—		0	0	35	1
Palermo	Total		68	3	2	0	—		2	0	72	3
1. FC Köln (loan)	2025–26	Bundesliga	33	0	2	0	—		—		35	0
Birmingham City	2026–27	Championship	2	0	0	0	—		1 (Note: Appearance in EFL Cup)	0	3	0
Career total			163	3	15	0	6	0	3	0	187	3

=== International ===
As of match played October 15, 2024

Appearances and goals by national team and year
National team	Year	Apps	Goals
United States	2023	3	0
United States	2024	4	0
Total		7	0

== Honors ==
BK Häcken

- Allsvenskan: 2022
- Svenska Cupen: 2022–23

United States

- CONCACAF Nations League: 2023–24
