= Sebastiano Desplanches =

Italian footballer (born 2003)

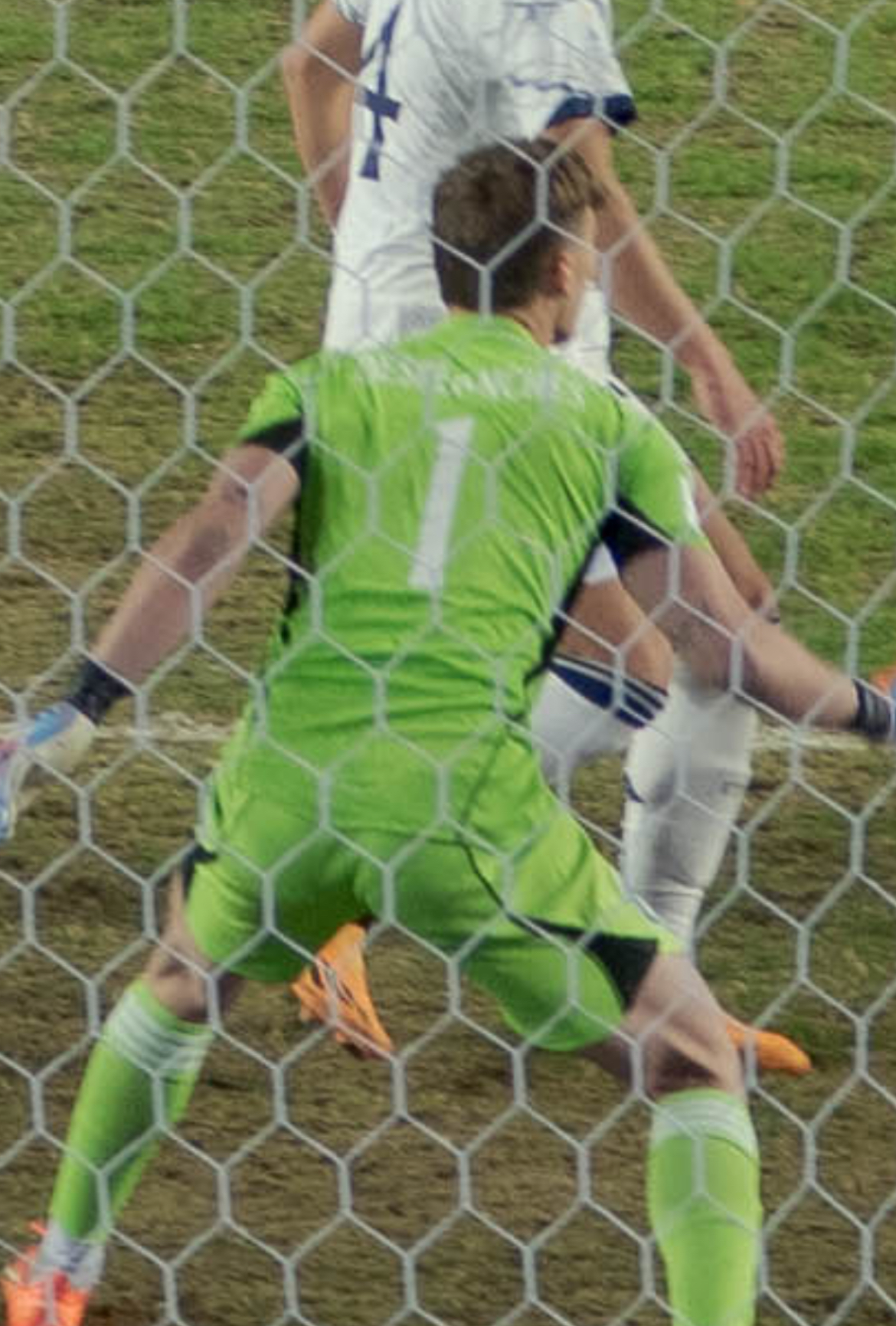
- Desplanches in 2023

Personal information
- Date of birth: 11 March 2003 (age 23)
- Place of birth: Novara, Italy
- Height: 1.88 m (6 ft 2 in)
- Position: Goalkeeper

Team information
- Current team: Frosinone (on loan from Palermo)
- Number: 91

Youth career
- –2014: Inter Milan
- 2014–2022: AC Milan

Senior career*
| Years | Team | Apps | (Gls) |
| 2022–2023 | Vicenza | 0 | (0) |
| 2023 | → Trento (loan) | 10 | (0) |
| 2023– | Palermo | 25 | (0) |
| 2025–2026 | → Pescara (loan) | 25 | (0) |
| 2026– | → Frosinone (loan) | 0 | (0) |

International career^{‡}
| 2018 | Italy U15 | 2 | (0) |
| 2018–2019 | Italy U16 | 5 | (0) |
| 2021 | Italy U18 | 1 | (0) |
| 2021–2022 | Italy U19 | 15 | (0) |
| 2022–2023 | Italy U20 | 8 | (0) |
| 2023–2025 | Italy U21 | 16 | (0) |
Medal record
Men's football
Representing Italy
FIFA U-20 World Cup
| Runner-up | 2023 Argentina |
- * Club domestic league appearances and goals as of 8 May 2026 ‡ National team caps and goals as of 22 June 2025

Sebastiano Desplanches (born 11 March 2003) is an Italian professional footballer who plays as a goalkeeper for Serie A club Frosinone, on loan from Palermo.

== Club career ==
Born in Novara, Desplanches started his career in AC Milan's youth sector.

On 1 September 2022, he left Milan and signed with Serie C club Vicenza. On 5 January 2023, he was loaned to fellow third-tier club Trento until the end of the season.

On 17 July 2023, Desplanches joined Serie B side Palermo for an undisclosed fee, signing a five-year contract with the club. He spent the 2023–24 season as an understudy to Mirko Pigliacelli, and made his Rosanero debut only on the final home game of the season, a 2–2 draw to Ascoli on 5 May 2024.

On 8 August 2025, Desplanches was loaned out to newly-promoted Serie B club Pescara.

On 18 July 2026, Desplanches moved on a new loan to newly Serie A promoted club Frosinone.

== International career ==
Desplanches was born in Italy to a French father and an Italian mother. He is a youth international for Italy, having represented the Italy U15s, U16s, U18s and U19s.

In June 2022, he was included in the squad that took part in the UEFA Under-19 European Championship in Slovakia, where Italy reached the semi-finals before getting knocked out by eventual champions England.

In May 2023, he was included in the Italy U20 squad that took part in the FIFA U-20 World Cup in Argentina. The Azzurrini finished runners-up after losing to Uruguay in the final, but he eventually received the Golden Glove award as the tournament's best goalkeeper.

On 8 September 2023, he made his debut with the Italy U21, in the qualifying match against Latvia.

== Career statistics ==
=== Club ===
As of match played 8 May 2026

Appearances and goals by club, season and competition
| Club | Season | League | | | National cup | | Other | | Total | |
| Club | Season | Division | Apps | Goals | Apps | Goals | Apps | Goals | Apps | Goals |
|---|---|---|---|---|---|---|---|---|---|---|
| Vicenza | 2022–23 | Serie C | 0 | 0 | 3 | 0 | — | | 3 | 0 |
| Trento (loan) | 2022–23 | Serie C | 10 | 0 | 0 | 0 | — | | 10 | 0 |
| Palermo | 2023–24 | Serie B | 2 | 0 | 0 | 0 | 2 | 0 | 4 | 0 |
| Palermo | 2024–25 | Serie B | 21 | 0 | 0 | 0 | 0 | 0 | 21 | 0 |
| Palermo | Total | | 23 | 0 | 0 | 0 | 2 | 0 | 25 | 0 |
| Pescara (loan) | 2025–26 | Serie B | 25 | 0 | 2 | 0 | — | | 27 | 0 |
| Frosinone (loan) | 2026–27 | Serie A | 0 | 0 | 0 | 0 | — | | 0 | 0 |
| Career total | | | 58 | 0 | 5 | 0 | 2 | 0 | 65 | 0 |

== Honours ==
Italy U20

- FIFA U-20 World Cup runner-up: 2023

Individual

- FIFA U-20 World Cup Golden Glove: 2023
- IFFHS Men's World Youth (U20) Team: 2023
