= MF Cardamone =

American artist and painter

MF Cardamone, also known as Maryfran Cardamone (born December 24, 1958), is an American born contemporary artist who works primarily in painting and printmaking. Cardamone lives and works in Philadelphia, Pennsylvania.

== Life ==
She was born in Mount Airy, a historic suburb outside Philadelphia. Her early childhood was spent exploring the woods of the Wissahickon Valley in Fairmount Park, the largest urban park system in the United States. Throughout her teenage years she pursued her love of horseback riding and art.

Cardamone studied liberal arts at Rosemont College from 1977 to 1979. It was during this time she met American Realist painter Tom Palmore. She began working for him as a studio assistant in his Philadelphia studio. They became romantically involved shortly thereafter and moved to Santa Fe, New Mexico, where they lived and worked together for many years. Cardamone said that Palmore was "a major influence on my life both artistically and personally. He was an amazing, insightful teacher who helped my development as an artist". During this time she worked on a series of painting and sculptures that were influenced by the plants and folklore of New Mexico. The couple eventually parted but remained close friends.

In 1984 she moved back to Philadelphia and founded Cardamone Designs, a successful limited editions clothing design company. She ran this company from 1984 to 1999. The company became known for the revival of hippy patchwork designed items. In 1987 she married David Schlessinger. In 2002, after taking a few years off to raise her two children, she began painting again and enrolled in the Barnes Foundation Arboretum School to pursue her love of horticulture. Her current body of work was greatly influenced by this period in her life.

== Work ==
Cardamone is best known for her unconventional botanically influenced works on paper that reinvents the genre of botanical illustration. Melding elements of 18th and 19th century botanical illustrations with the imaginative randomness of Berlin Dada and Surrealist collage methods, she creates interpretations of the intersection of nature, taxonomy, and popular culture. Cardamone collects plant specimens and combines them with images and words, revealing the science, history, and beauty of her subjects. She also finds inspiration in medieval herbals and manuscripts, folklore, traditional Chinese medicine, and pop art.

== See also ==
- MF Cardamone website
- Exhibitions
