= Aljoša Vasić =

Italian-Serbian footballer (born 2002)

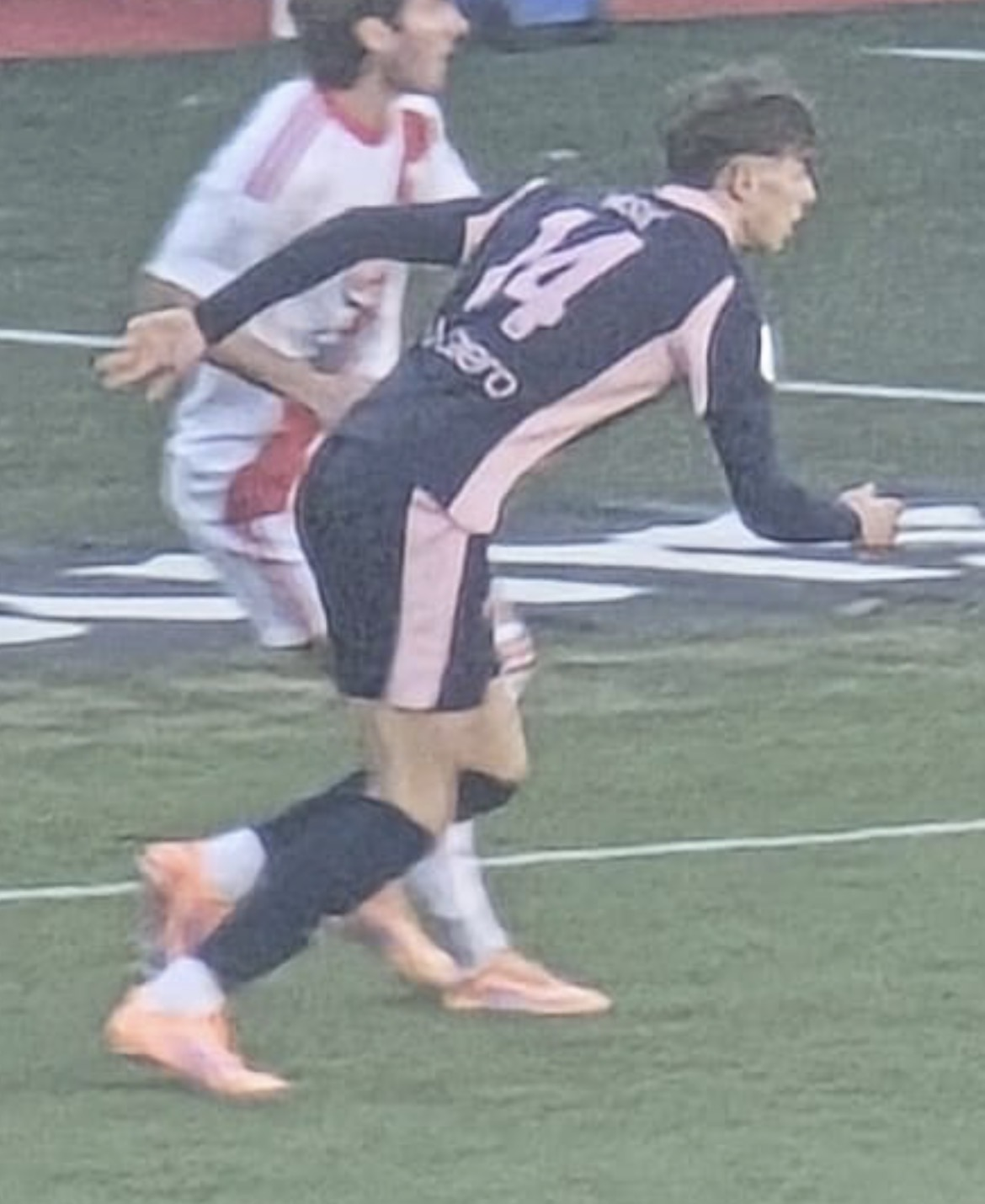
- Vasić playing for Palermo in 2026

Personal information
- Date of birth: 21 April 2002 (age 24)
- Place of birth: Camposampiero, Italy
- Height: 1.88 m (6 ft 2 in)
- Position: Midfielder

Team information
- Current team: Südtirol (on loan from Palermo)
- Number: 14

Youth career
- Cittadella
- 2011–2020: Padova

Senior career*
Years	Team	Apps	(Gls)
2020–2023	Padova	51	(8)
2022	→ Lecco (loan)	13	(0)
2023–	Palermo	66	(0)
2026–	→ Südtirol (loan)	1	(0)

International career^{‡}
2023–2024	Serbia U21	3	(0)
- * Club domestic league appearances and goals as of 22 August 2026 ‡ National team caps and goals as of 26 March 2024

Aljoša Vasić (Serbian Cyrillic: Аљоша Васић; born 21 April 2002) is a professional footballer who plays as a midfielder for Serie B club Südtirol, on loan from Palermo. Born in Italy, Vasić represents Serbia internationally.

== Club career ==
Vasić first joined Padova's academy in 2011: he then spent a season-long loan at Cittadella before coming through his parent club's youth ranks. Having been promoted to Padova's first team at the start of the 2020–21 season, under head coach Andrea Mandorlini, he made his professional debut for the club on 30 September 2020, starting in a 3–1 away win over Frosinone in the Coppa Italia.

On 31 January 2022, Vasić extended his contract with Padova until 2026 and was subsequently loaned to fellow Serie C side Lecco for the remainder of the season.

On 17 September 2022, Vasić scored his first professional goal in a 3–0 league win over Pro Patria. During the 2022–23 season, he established himself as a regular starter and one of the most valuable performers of his side, having scored eight goals and four assists in 37 league matches; however Padova was eventually eliminated by Virtus Verona in the second round of the playoffs.

On 5 July 2023, Vasić officially joined Serie B side Palermo for a reported fee of two million euros, plus add-ons, signing a five-year contract with the club.

== International career ==
In September 2023, Vasić was called up by the Serbian under-21 national team for a 2025 UEFA European Under-21 Championship qualification game against Azerbaijan.

== Style of play ==
Despite playing as a forward at the start of his youth career, Vasić was moved to the mezzala role a few years before his professional debut. He has been regarded for his physical attributes and his athleticism, as well as his ability in aerial duels and his off-the-ball movements.

During his spell at Padova, he was compared to Jorginho and Marco Tardelli by his first-team coaches.

== Personal life ==
Vasić was born in Camposampiero, Italy, to Bosnian Serb parents from Banja Luka.

He holds Italian, Serbian and Bosnian citizenship.
