= Davide Veroli =

Italian football player (born 2003)

Personal information
- Date of birth: 29 January 2003 (age 23)
- Place of birth: Ancona, Italy
- Height: 1.88 m (6 ft 2 in)
- Position: Centre-back

Team information
- Current team: Südtirol (on loan from Cagliari)
- Number: 3

Youth career
- –2021: Pescara
- 2022–2023: Cagliari

Senior career*
| Years | Team | Apps | (Gls) |
| 2021–2022 | Pescara | 19 | (0) |
| 2022– | Cagliari | 0 | (0) |
| 2023–2024 | → Catanzaro (loan) | 28 | (0) |
| 2024–2025 | → Sampdoria (loan) | 14 | (1) |
| 2025–2026 | → Palermo (loan) | 11 | (0) |
| 2026– | → Südtirol (loan) | 1 | (0) |

International career^{‡}
| 2024 | Italy U21 | 4 | (0) |
- * Club domestic league appearances and goals as of 22 August 2026 ‡ National team caps and goals as of 16 June 2024

Davide Veroli (born 29 January 2003) is an Italian professional footballer who plays as a centre-back for Serie B club Südtirol, on loan from Cagliari.

== Club career ==
A youth product of Pescara, Veroli made his senior debut in 2021, playing a total of 19 Serie C league games for the club.

He was successively signed by Cagliari, first playing for the club's Under-19 Primavera team throughout the 2022–23 season, and then being loaned out to Serie B club Catanzaro in 2023.

On 10 August 2024, Veroli signed for Serie B fallen giants Sampdoria, on a loan deal with an option to buy. After a season at Sampdoria, Veroli returned to Cagliari, only to be loaned out again for one more season, this time to Serie B club Palermo.

== International career ==
In June 2024, Veroli received his first call-up by the Italy national under-21 football team.
