= Valerio Cardamone =

Italian footballer

Personal information
- Date of birth: 7 February 1999 (age 27)
- Place of birth: Taranto, Italy
- Height: 1.84 m (6 ft 0 in)
- Position: Left-back

Team information
- Current team: Fidelis Andria
- Number: 32

Youth career
- 2013–2015: Taranto
- 2015–2016: Martina
- 2016–2017: Torino
- 2016–2017: → Carpi (loan)

Senior career*
| Years | Team | Apps | (Gls) |
| 2017–2018 | Legnago | 15 | (0) |
| 2018–2019 | Francavilla | 26 | (0) |
| 2019–2020 | Bisceglie | 16 | (0) |
| 2020–2021 | Foggia | 3 | (0) |
| 2022 | Molfetta | 8 | (0) |
| 2022–2023 | Casale | 9 | (0) |
| 2023– | Fidelis Andria | 0 | (0) |

International career
| 2016–2017 | Italy U-17 | 6 | (0) |
- * Club domestic league appearances and goals as of 20 December 2023

Valerio Cardamone (born 7 February 1999) is an Italian professional footballer who plays as a left-back for Serie D club Fidelis Andria.

== Club career ==
=== Youth career ===
Born in Taranto, Valerio Cardamone began his football career with the club of his native city, Taranto. At the age of 16, he joined Martina Franca where he became finalist of the Allievi Nazionali Lega Pro (under-17). Next year he played in the Primavera 1 (under-18) division with Torino, before signing at Carpi for a year on loan.

=== Serie D ===
He started his senior career with two years in Serie D. First season at Legnago in 2017–18, and second season at Francavilla in 2018–19.

=== Bisceglie ===
On 5 August 2019, Cardamone signed his first professional contract with Bisceglie. On 25 August 2019, he made his debut in the Serie C group C championship against Rende and won the game 1–0. He spent the entire year in the club.

=== Foggia ===
On 9 December 2020, Cardamone signed a contract with Foggia. On 17 January 2021, he started with his new team in the Serie C group C against Catania and lost 2-1.

=== Fidelis Andria ===
On 26 August 2023, Cardamone joined Fidelis Andria in Serie D.

== International career ==
At the age of 16, Cardamone played for Italy under-17 team. Then, he was called by the coach of the national under-18 team for the Dossena Trophy who started on 11 June 2018 and was reserved for the 1999 and 2000 youths. He played for the Lega Pro Representative italy national team during the 2015–16 season, and for the Serie D Representative italy national team during the 2017–18 season.
