= Daniele Rocco =

Italian footballer, forward (born 1998)

Personal information
- Date of birth: 27 December 1998 (age 27)
- Place of birth: Magenta, Italy
- Height: 1.70 m (5 ft 7 in)
- Position: Forward

Team information
- Current team: Sanremese
- Number: 11

Youth career
- Reggiana

Senior career*
Years	Team	Apps	(Gls)
2016–2018	Reggiana	16	(0)
2018–2019	Alessandria	12	(0)
2019–2022	Caronnese	57	(7)
2022–2023	Legnano	35	(4)
2023–	Sanremese	11	(1)
- * Club domestic league appearances and goals as of 20 December 2023

Daniele Rocco (born 27 December 1998) is an Italian footballer who plays as a forward for Serie D club Sanremese.

== Club career ==
Rocco was born in Magenta. His first professional team was Serie C side Reggiana, he made his professional debut in the 2017–18 season, on 2 December 2017 against AlbinoLeffe, coming in as a substitute for Alessandro Cesarini in the 84th minute. He signed to Alessandria on 3 August 2018.

On 6 September 2019, his contract with Alessandria was dissolved by mutual consent.

== Sources ==
- Daniele Rocco at TuttoCalciatori.net (in Italian)
