= Simon Graves Jensen =

Danish footballer

Simon Graves
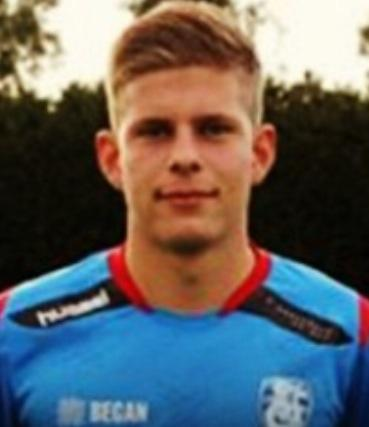

Personal information
- Full name: Simon Graves Jensen
- Date of birth: 22 May 1999 (age 27)
- Place of birth: Holstebro, Denmark
- Height: 1.91 m (6 ft 3 in)
- Position: Centre-back

Team information
- Current team: PEC Zwolle
- Number: 28

Youth career
- –2015: Holstebro Boldklub
- 2015–2018: Randers Freja

Senior career*
Years	Team	Apps	(Gls)
2018–2023	Randers	77	(1)
2023–2025	Palermo	17	(1)
2024–2025	→ PEC Zwolle (loan)	27	(0)
2025–	PEC Zwolle	32	(0)

International career
2018	Denmark U19	3	(0)
- * Club domestic league appearances and goals as of 21 May 2026

Simon Graves Jensen (born 22 May 1999) is a Danish professional footballer who plays as a centre-back for Eredivisie club PEC Zwolle.

== Club career ==
=== Years in Denmark ===
Graves started playing football at Holstebro Boldklub before joining the Randers FC youth academy at under-17 level. In January 2018, he signed his first professional contract, a three-year deal. He made his professional debut on 11 September 2018 in a Danish Cup match against Næsby Boldklub. He started in central defense that day as his team won in a penalty-shootout. On 4 November, he played his first match in the Danish Superliga, the top level of Danish football, against AGF. He came on as a substitute for Saba Lobzhanidze in a 2–0 win.

On 26 June 2020, Graves extended his contract with Randers until 2024.

Graves scored his first professional goal on 16 September 2021 in a 2–2 home draw against AZ Alkmaar in the UEFA Europa Conference League group stage.

=== Palermo ===
On 30 January 2023, Graves signed a four-and-a-half-year deal with Italian club Palermo in Serie B.

=== PEC Zwolle ===
On 21 August 2024, Graves moved to PEC Zwolle in the Netherlands on loan with an option to buy.

After one positive season in the Netherlands, PEC Zwolle eventually signed Graves permanently from Palermo on 23 May 2025.

== International career ==
On 16 January 2018, Graves made his Denmark U19 debut during a 1–0 win over Cyprus in a friendly in Ayia Napa.

== Career statistics ==
As of match played 27 January 2023

Appearances and goals by club, season and competition
Club	Season	League			Cup		Continental		Other		Total	
Club	Season	Division	Apps	Goals	Apps	Goals	Apps	Goals	Apps	Goals	Apps	Goals
Randers	2018–19	Superliga	4	0	2	0	—		0	0	6	0
Randers	2019–20	Superliga	9	0	2	0	—		2 (Note: Appearance(s) in Superliga European play-offs)	0	13	0
Randers	2020–21	Superliga	25	0	7	0	—		0	0	32	0
Randers	2021–22	Superliga	21	0	1	0	5 (Note: Appearance(s) in UEFA Europa Conference League)	1	0	0	27	1
Randers	2022–23	Superliga	16	1	1	0	—		0	0	17	1
Career total			75	1	13	0	5	1	2	0	95	2

== Honours ==
Randers

- Danish Cup: 2020–21
