= Luis Maldonado (footballer, born 1996) =

Ecuadorian footballer

Personal information
- Full name: Luis Alberto Maldonado Morocho
- Date of birth: 15 May 1996 (age 30)
- Place of birth: Pasaje, Ecuador
- Height: 1.69 m (5 ft 7 in)
- Position: Midfielder

Team information
- Current team: Pistoiese
- Number: 28

Youth career
- –2008: Junín
- 2008: Kléber Franco Cruz
- 2009: Urseza
- 2014–2015: Chievo

Senior career*
Years	Team	Apps	(Gls)
2014	Pinzolo Valrendena		
2015–2016	Chievo	0	(0)
2015–2016	→ Este (loan)	36	(2)
2016–2020	Arzignano	114	(29)
2020–2022	Catania	45	(2)
2022	Catanzaro	6	(0)
2022–2023	Lecco	17	(0)
2023	Turris	11	(0)
2023–2024	Campobasso	37	(8)
2024–	Pistoiese	2	(1)
- * Club domestic league appearances and goals as of 24 November 2024

Luis Alberto Maldonado Morocho (born 15 May 1996) is an Ecuadorian footballer who plays as a midfielder for Italian Serie D club Pistoiese.

== Career ==
In 2015, he was sent on loan to Este in the Italian fourth division Serie D from Italian Serie A club Chievo.

While playing for Arzignano in the Italian fourth division, he received offers from the second and third division but could not join due to not having citizenship of the European Union at the time.

In 2020, Maldonado signed for Italian third division Serie C team Catania. After the league initially did not register him due to question about his legal status, he was accepted to play on 8 October 2020.

On 20 January 2022, he moved to Catanzaro in Serie C.

On 12 August 2022, Maldonado signed with Lecco. On 10 January 2023, he moved to Turris.
