= Giacomo Corona =

Italian football player (born 2002)

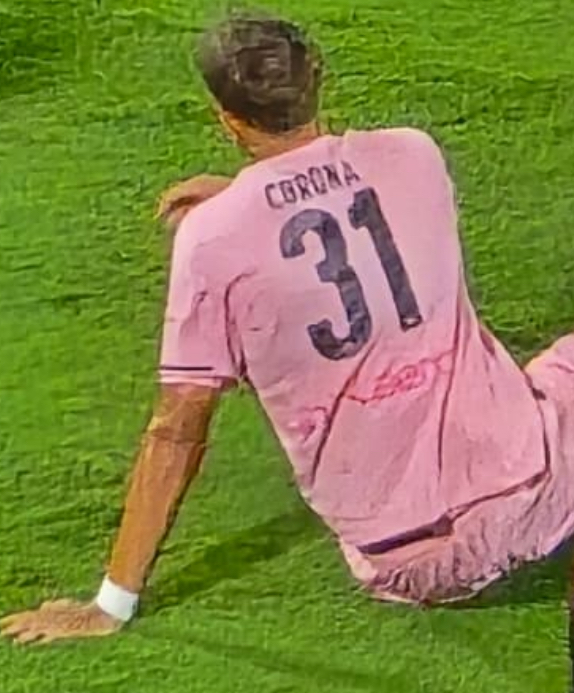
- Corona playing for Palermo in 2025

Personal information
- Date of birth: 24 February 2004 (age 22)
- Place of birth: Palermo, Italy
- Height: 1.95 m (6 ft 5 in)
- Position: Striker

Team information
- Current team: Virtus Entella (on loan from Palermo)
- Number: 9

Youth career
- –2012: Louis Ribolla
- 2012–2024: Palermo
- 2022–2023: → Torino (loan)
- 2023–2024: → Empoli (loan)

Senior career*
Years	Team	Apps	(Gls)
2021–	Palermo	15	(0)
2023–2024	→ Empoli (loan)	1	(0)
2024–2025	→ Pontedera (loan)	35	(10)
2026–	→ Virtus Entella (loan)	0	(0)
- * Club domestic league appearances and goals as of 12 May 2026

Giacomo Corona (born 24 February 2004) is an Italian professional footballer who plays as a striker for Serie B club Virtus Entella, on loan from Palermo.

== Club career ==
A Palermo youth product, Corona made his senior debut for the Rosanero in 2021 during a Serie C league game against Turris. He was successively loaned out to Torino in August 2021, playing exclusively for the Under-19 team before heading back to Palermo by the end of the season.

In August 2023, Corona left Palermo again, this time to join Empoli on another loan deal. He almost exclusively played for the Under-19 team, except for a lone four-minute appearance in a Serie A league game against Hellas Verona on 15 January 2024.

In August 2024, after returning from his Empoli loan, Corona agreed a contract extension until 30 June 2027 with Palermo, and was successively loaned out to Serie C club Pontedera. With Pontedera, Corona finally succeeded in playing regularly and making it to the spotlight, amassing a total ten goals in the regular season plus another one in the promotion playoffs.

After his positive campaign at Pontedera, Palermo, under new head coach Filippo Inzaghi, called back the player to join the pre-season training camp, scoring four goals in the first friendly game.

On 14 July 2026, Corona was loaned by Virtus Entella in Serie B.

== Personal life ==
He is the son of former Serie A striker Giorgio Corona.
