= List of Italian football transfers summer 2024 =

The 2024 Italian football summer transfer window ran from 1 July to 30 August 2024. This list includes transfers featuring at least one club from either Serie A or Serie B that were completed after the end of the 2023–24 season and before the end of the summer 2024 window on 31 August. Some contracts were already signed and announced before the window opening.

== Transfers ==
All players and clubs without a flag are Italian.

Legend

- Those clubs in Italic indicate that the player already left the team on loan on this or the previous season or a new signing that immediately left the club.

Date	Name	Moving from	Moving to	Fee
15 April 2024	(Brazil) Felipe Anderson	Lazio	(Brazil) Palmeiras	Free
16 May 2024	(Denmark) Jens Odgaard	(Netherlands) AZ	Bologna	Undisclosed (Note: The player already played for his new club in the 2023–24 season, the deal turned from temporary to definitive.)
29 May 2024	(Croatia) Stanko Jurić	Parma	(Spain) Valladolid	Undisclosed
30 May 2024	(Germany) Suat Serdar	(Germany) Hertha BSC	Hellas Verona	Undisclosed
31 May 2024	(Spain) Angeliño	(Germany) RB Leipzig	Roma	Undisclosed
31 May 2024	(Switzerland) Kevin Rüegg	Hellas Verona	(Switzerland) Basel	Undisclosed
4 June 2024	(Belgium) Jackson Tchatchoua	(Belgium) Charleroi	Verona	Undisclosed
7 June 2024	(The Gambia) Ebrima Colley	Atalanta	(Switzerland) Young Boys	Undisclosed
7 June 2024	Edoardo Masciangelo	Benevento	Cittadella	Free
11 June 2024	(Spain) Luis Alberto	Lazio	(Qatar) Al-Duhail	Undisclosed
11 June 2024	(Brazil) Kaio Jorge	Juventus	(Brazil) Cruzeiro	€7.2M
11 June 2024	(England) Omari Forson	(England) Manchester United	Monza	Undisclosed
12 June 2024	Michele Avella	Frosinone	Brescia	Undisclosed
12 June 2024	Gennaro Borrelli	Frosinone	Brescia	Undisclosed
13 June 2024	(Hungary) Ádám Nagy	Pisa	Spezia	Undisclosed
13 June 2024	Lorenzo Lucca	Pisa	Udinese	Undisclosed
14 June 2024	(Slovenia) Lovro Štubljar	Empoli	(Slovenia) Celje	Loan
14 June 2024	Simone Tronchin	Vicenza	Cittadella	Undisclosed
14 June 2024	(Austria) Matthias Braunöder	Austria Wien	Como	Undisclosed
15 June 2024	(Morocco) Adam Masina	Udinese	Torino	Undisclosed
15 June 2024	Gennaro Tutino	Parma	Cosenza	Undisclosed
15 June 2024	Lorenzo Dickmann	SPAL	Brescia	Undisclosed
15 June 2024	(Belgium) Charles De Ketelaere	Milan	Atalanta	Undisclosed
17 June 2024	Lorenzo Bernasconi	Cremonese	Atalanta U23	Undisclosed
18 June 2024	(Serbia) Marko Lazetić	Milan	(Serbia) TSC	Loan
18 June 2024	(Romania) Răzvan Pașcalău	Lecce	(Romania) Dinamo București	Undisclosed
18 June 2024	(Cameroon) Jean-Pierre Nsame	Como	(Poland) Legia Warsaw	Loan
19 June 2024	(Spain) Tete Morente	(Spain) Elche	Lecce	Free
19 June 2024	(France) Balthazar Pierret	(France) Quevilly-Rouen	Lecce	Free
19 June 2024	Francesco D'Alessio	Roma	Cittadella	Undisclosed
21 June 2024	(France) Michaël Cuisance	Venezia	(Germany) Hertha BSC	Undisclosed
21 June 2024	(Portugal) Vitinha	(France) Marseille	Genoa	Undisclosed
24 June 2024	Alessandro Debenedetti	Genoa	Mantova	Loan
25 June 2024	Andrea Belotti	Roma	Como	Undisclosed
25 June 2024	(Germany) Christian Früchtl	Austria Wien	Lecce	Undisclosed
26 June 2024	(Angola) Kialonda Gaspar	(Portugal) Estrela	Lecce	Undisclosed
26 June 2024	(Ivory Coast) Christian Kouan	Perugia	Cosenza	Free
26 June 2024	(The Gambia) Kalifa Kujabi	Frosinone	CFR Cluj	Free (Note: Kujabi eventually joined Hermannstadt on 5 August, since Cluj could not register him due to the Romanian league's rules on non-EU players.)
27 June 2024	(Poland) Bartłomiej Drągowski	Spezia	(Greece) Panathinaikos	Undisclosed
28 June 2024	(England) Ben Godfrey	(England) Everton	Atalanta	Undisclosed
28 June 2024	(Poland) Aleksander Buksa	Genoa	(Poland) Górnik Zabrze	Undisclosed
28 June 2024	(Sweden) Emil Holm	Spezia	Bologna	Undisclosed
28 June 2024	(Slovenia) Tio Cipot	Spezia	(Austria) Grazer AK	Loan
28 June 2024	(Spain) Álex Jiménez	(Spain) Real Madrid	Milan	Undisclosed
28 June 2024	Jacopo Desogus	Cagliari	Cittadella	Undisclosed
28 June 2024	Federico Artioli	Sassuolo	Mantova	Undisclosed
28 June 2024	(Brazil) Matheus Henrique	Sassuolo	(Brazil) Cruzeiro	Undisclosed
29 June 2024	(Lithuania) Marius Adamonis	Lazio	Catania	Undisclosed
29 June 2024	Alberto Dossena	Cagliari	Como	Undisclosed
29 June 2024	Issa Doumbia	AlbinoLeffe	Venezia	Undisclosed
30 June 2024	(Netherlands) Tijjani Noslin	Hellas Verona	Lazio	Undisclosed
30 June 2024	(Spain) Raúl Moro	Lazio	(Spain) Valladolid	Undisclosed
30 June 2024	(Brazil) Douglas Luiz	(England) Aston Villa	Juventus	€50M
1 July 2024	(France) Loum Tchaouna	Salernitana	Lazio	Undisclosed
1 July 2024	(Argentina) Enzo Barrenechea	Juventus	(England) Aston Villa	€8M
1 July 2024	(England) Samuel Iling-Junior	Juventus	(England) Aston Villa	€14M
1 July 2024	(Germany) Koray Günter	Hellas Verona	(Turkey) Göztepe	Loan
1 July 2024	Cristiano Piccini	Sampdoria	(Mexico) Atlético San Luis	Free
1 July 2024	(Spain) Cristóbal Muñoz	(Spain) Barcelona B	Lazio	Free
1 July 2024	(Brazil) Filipe Bordon	(Brazil) Ferroviária	Lazio	Undisclosed
1 July 2024	(Belgium) Matthias Verreth	(Netherlands) Willem II	Brescia	Undisclosed
2 July 2024	Mattia Caldara	Milan	Modena	Free
2 July 2024	(Chile) Damián Pizarro	(Chile) Colo-Colo	Udinese	Undisclosed
2 July 2024	(Portugal) Luís Maximiano	Lazio	(Spain) Almería	Undisclosed
2 July 2024	(Brazil) Walace	Udinese	(Brazil) Cruzeiro	Undisclosed
3 July 2024	Riyad Idrissi	Cagliari	Modena	Loan
3 July 2024	Federico Botti	Arzignano	Mantova	Undisclosed
3 July 2024	Francesco Ruocco	Torres	Mantova	Undisclosed
3 July 2024	William Rovida	Inter	Pro Patria	Undisclosed
3 July 2024	(Serbia) Aleksandar Stanković	Inter	(Switzerland) Luzern	Loan
3 July 2024	(Spain) Juan Miranda	(Spain) Betis	Bologna	Free
3 July 2024	Guido Della Rovere	Cremonese	Bayern Munich	Undisclosed
4 July 2024	(Colombia) Daniel Mosquera	(Colombia) América	Verona	Undisclosed
4 July 2024	(Belgium) Jari Vandeputte	Catanzaro	Cremonese	Loan
4 July 2024	Andrea Fulignati	Catanzaro	Cremonese	Loan
4 July 2024	Matteo Solini	Como	Mantova	Undisclosed
4 July 2024	Costantino Favasuli	Fiorentina	Bari	Loan
5 July 2024	Romano Floriani Mussolini	Lazio	Juve Stabia	Loan
5 July 2024	Michele Di Gregorio	Monza	Juventus	Loan
5 July 2024	Nicolò Zaniolo	(Turkey) Galatasaray	Atalanta	Loan
5 July 2024	Luca Ceppitelli	Feralpisalò	Südtirol	Free
5 July 2024	Thomas Alberti	Fiorenzuola	Modena	Free
5 July 2024	(Australia) Trent Buhagiar	(Australia) Newcastle Jets	Brescia	Undisclosed
5 July 2024	Simone Ascione	Victoria Marra	Venezia	Undisclosed
6 July 2024	(Senegal) Alfred Gomis	(France) Rennes	Palermo	Undisclosed
6 July 2024	(Nigeria) Fisayo Dele-Bashiru	(Turkey) Hatayspor	Lazio	Loan
6 July 2024	(Poland) Piotr Zieliński	Napoli	Inter	Free
6 July 2024	Nicola Pietrangeli	Rimini	Südtirol	Undisclosed
6 July 2024	Francesco Folino	Carrarese	Juve Stabia	Undisclosed
6 July 2024	Yuri Rocchetti	Cremonese	Juve Stabia	Loan
6 July 2024	Flavio Di Dio	Giugliano	Juve Stabia	Undisclosed
7 July 2024	Christian Pierobon	Verona	Juve Stabia	Undisclosed
8 July 2024	(Slovenia) Luka Topalović	(Slovenia) Domžale	Inter	Undisclosed
8 July 2024	Sebastiano Luperto	Empoli	Cagliari	Undisclosed
8 July 2024	Luigi Palomba	Cagliari	Vis Pesaro	Loan
8 July 2024	Jacopo Manconi	Modena	Benevento	Undisclosed
8 July 2024	Niccolò Corrado	Ternana	Brescia	Undisclosed
8 July 2024	Tommaso Di Marco	Torino	Juve Stabia	Loan
8 July 2024	Armando Anastasio	Monza	Catania	Undisclosed
9 July 2024	Valerio Crespi	Lazio	Südtirol	Loan
9 July 2024	(Netherlands) Abdou Harroui	Frosinone	Verona	Undisclosed
9 July 2024	(Portugal) João Moutinho	Spezia	(Poland) Jagiellonia	Undisclosed
9 July 2024	Caleb Okoli	Atalanta	(England) Leicester	Undisclosed
9 July 2024	Jacopo Da Riva	Atalanta U23	Juve Stabia	Loan
9 July 2024	Moise Kean	Juventus	Fiorentina	Undisclosed
9 July 2024	Massimiliano Mangraviti	Brescia	Cesena	Undisclosed
9 July 2024	Ousmane Niang	Pro Vercelli	Modena	Undisclosed
9 July 2024	(Spain) Josep Martínez	Genoa	Inter	Undisclosed
9 July 2024	Davide Gentile	Fiorentina	Salernitana	Loan
9 July 2024	Marco Tremolada	Como	Lumezzane	Loan
10 July 2024	Leonardo Spinazzola	Roma	Napoli	Free
10 July 2024	(Netherlands) Olaf Gorter	(Netherlands) Ajax	Lecce	Undisclosed
10 July 2024	Edoardo Bernardi	Verona	Trento	Loan
10 July 2024	Luca Verna	Catanzaro	Catania	Undisclosed
10 July 2024	Marco Varnier	Atalanta	Juve Stabia	Undisclosed
10 July 2024	Edoardo Motta	Juventus	Reggiana	Undisclosed
10 July 2024	Nicolò Cavuoti	Cagliari	Feralpisalò	Loan
10 July 2024	Mattia Felici	Feralpisalò	Cagliari	Undisclosed
10 July 2024	(France) Khéphren Thuram	(France) Nice	Juventus	€20M
10 July 2024	(France) Enzo Le Fée	(France) Rennes	Roma	Undisclosed
10 July 2024	(Spain) Rafa Marín	(Spain) Real Madrid	Napoli	Undisclosed
10 July 2024	Nosa Obaretin	Napoli	Bari	Loan
10 July 2024	(France) Lilian Njoh	(France) Le Mans	Salernitana	Loan
10 July 2024	Lorenzo Coccia	Modena	Arezzo	Undisclosed
11 July 2024	(Croatia) Filip Brekalo	(Croatia) Dinamo Zagreb	Reggiana	Undisclosed
11 July 2024	Filippo Scaglia	Südtirol	Juve Next Gen	Undisclosed
11 July 2024	Marco Ballarini	Udinese	Triestina	Loan
11 July 2024	Alessandro Zanoli	Napoli	Genoa	Loan
11 July 2024	Lorenzo Sgarbi	Napoli	Bari	Loan
11 July 2024	(Denmark) Martin Frese	(Denmark) Nordsjælland	Verona	Free
11 July 2024	(Norway) Kristoffer Askildsen	Sampdoria	(Denmark) Midtjylland	Free
11 July 2024	Jacopo Martini	Inter	Südtirol	Undisclosed
11 July 2024	Giacomo Stabile	Inter	Alcione	Loan
11 July 2024	Marco Bleve	Lecce	Carrarese	Loan
11 July 2024	Federico Casolari	Sassuolo	Cittadella	Loan
12 July 2024	Fabrizio Bagheria	Pro Sesto	Modena	Undisclosed
12 July 2024	Christian Dalle Mura	Fiorentina	Cosenza	Undisclosed
12 July 2024	(Slovenia) Nik Prelec	Cagliari	Austria Wien	Loan
12 July 2024	Marco Bertini	Lazio	Ascoli	Loan
12 July 2024	Laurens Serpe	Spezia	Pro Vercelli	Loan
12 July 2024	Giacomo Manzari	Sassuolo	Bari	Undisclosed
12 July 2024	Leonardo Mancuso	Monza	Mantova	Undisclosed
12 July 2024	Nicolò Cambiaghi	Atalanta	Bologna	Undisclosed
12 July 2024	Massimo Coda	Genoa	Sampdoria	Undisclosed
12 July 2024	(Argentina) Franco Carboni	Inter	(Argentina) River Plate	Loan
13 July 2024	(Iran) Mehdi Taremi	(Portugal) Porto	Inter	Free
13 July 2024	Mattia Zanotti	Inter	(Switzerland) Lugano	Undisclosed
13 July 2024	Gaetano Oristanio	Inter	Venezia	Undisclosed
13 July 2024	Gabriele Artistico	Lazio	Juve Stabia	Loan
13 July 2024	Giorgio Cittadini	Atalanta	Frosinone	Loan
13 July 2024	Giovanni Volpe	Potenza	Catanzaro	Loan
13 July 2024	Tommaso Raineri	Spezia	Sestri Levante	Loan
13 July 2024	(Argentina) Ryduan Palermo	Martina	Carrarese	Undisclosed
13 July 2024	(Argentina) Mateo Scheffer	Vigor Senigallia	Carrarese	Undisclosed
13 July 2024	Filippo Oliana	Sestri Levante	Carrarese	Undisclosed
13 July 2024	Andrea Oliveri	Atalanta Under-23	Bari	Loan
13 July 2024	Franco Tongya	(Denmark) Odense	Salernitana	Undisclosed
13 July 2024	Alessandro Buongiorno	Torino	Napoli	Undisclosed
13 July 2024	Ciro Immobile	Lazio	(Turkey) Beşiktaş	Undisclosed
13 July 2024	Gianmarco Begheldo	Virtus Verona	Cosenza	Undisclosed
13 July 2024	Aiman Riahi	Hellas Verona	Caldiero Terme	Loan
14 July 2024	(Greece) Dimitrios Nikolaou	Spezia	Palermo	Undisclosed
14 July 2024	(Netherlands) Joshua Zirkzee	Bologna	(England) Manchester United	Undisclosed
15 July 2024	Lorenzo Costantino	Sampdoria	Virtus Francavilla	Undisclosed
15 July 2024	Edoardo Soleri	Palermo	Spezia	Undisclosed
15 July 2024	Giuseppe Aurelio	Palermo	Spezia	Loan
15 July 2024	(Japan) Zion Suzuki	(Belgium) Sint-Truiden	Parma	Undisclosed
15 July 2024	(Portugal) Nuno Tavares	(England) Arsenal	Lazio	Loan
15 July 2024	(Slovenia) Žan Jevšenak	(Portugal) Benfica B	Pisa	Undisclosed
15 July 2024	Mattia Compagnon	Juve Next Gen	Catanzaro	Loan
15 July 2024	Federico Bonini	Virtus Entella	Catanzaro	Undisclosed
16 July 2024	(Portugal) Pedro Mendes	Ascoli	Modena	Undisclosed
16 July 2024	(France) Karim Zedadka	(Luxembourg) Swift Hesperange	Südtirol	Undisclosed
16 July 2024	Luca Ghiringhelli	Südtirol	Novara	Undisclosed
16 July 2024	Alessandro Caporale	Lecco	Cosenza	Undisclosed
16 July 2024	Mirko Pigliacelli	Palermo	Catanzaro	Undisclosed
16 July 2024	(France) Thomas Henry	Verona	Palermo	Loan
16 July 2024	(Albania) Kevin Haveri	Torino	Campobasso	Loan
16 July 2024	(Slovenia) Martin Turk	Parma	(Poland) Ruch Chorzów	€150.000
16 July 2024	Marco Zunno	Cremonese	Foggia	Loan
17 July 2024	(Algeria) Houssem Aouar	Roma	(Saudi Arabia) Al-Ittihad	Undisclosed
17 July 2024	(Equatorial Guinea) Saúl Coco	(Spain) Las Palmas	Torino	Undisclosed
17 July 2024	(Brazil) Eric Botteghin	Ascoli	Modena	Free
17 July 2024	Sebastiano Esposito	Inter	Empoli	Loan
17 July 2024	(Australia) Mathew Ryan	(Netherlands) AZ	Roma	Free
17 July 2024	Roberto Piccoli	Atalanta	Cagliari	Loan
17 July 2024	(France) Michel Adopo	Atalanta	Cagliari	Loan
17 July 2024	Nadir Zortea	Atalanta	Cagliari	Undisclosed
17 July 2024	(Ghana) Ibrahim Sulemana	Cagliari	Atalanta	Undisclosed
17 July 2024	Emanuele Zuelli	Pisa	Carrarese	Undisclosed
17 July 2024	Brayan Boci	Genoa	Feralpisalò	Undisclosed
17 July 2024	Giuseppe D'Agostino	Napoli	Giugliano	Loan
18 July 2024	(Spain) Pepe Reina	(Spain) Villarreal	Como	Free
18 July 2024	(Serbia) Nikola Milenković	Fiorentina	(England) Nottingham Forest	Undisclosed
18 July 2024	(Croatia) Marin Pongračić	Lecce	Fiorentina	Undisclosed
18 July 2024	(Colombia) Juan Cabal	Hellas Verona	Juventus	€12.8M
18 July 2024	(France) Adrien Rabiot	Juventus	Unattached	Free
18 July 2024	Dennis Curatolo	Inter	Pro Patria	Undisclosed
18 July 2024	(Colombia) Devis Vásquez	Milan	Empoli	Loan
18 July 2024	Antonino Viola	Lecce	Altamura	Undisclosed
18 July 2024	Lorenzo Venuti	Lecce	Sampdoria	Undisclosed
18 July 2024	Marco Delle Monache	Sampdoria	Lecce	Undisclosed
18 July 2024	(Latvia) Dario Šits	Parma	(Netherlands) Helmond Sport	Loan
18 July 2024	(Greece) Dimitris Sounas	Catanzaro	Avellino	Undisclosed
18 July 2024	(Greece) Ilias Koutsoupias	Benevento	Catanzaro	Undisclosed
18 July 2024	Mattia Florio	Hellas Verona	Caldiero Terme	Loan
19 July 2024	(Spain) Álvaro Morata	(Spain) Atlético Madrid	Milan	Undisclosed
19 July 2024	(Spain) Álex Pérez	(Spain) Betis	Inter	Loan
19 July 2024	(Nigeria) Ebenezer Akinsanmiro	Inter	Sampdoria	Loan
19 July 2024	Francesco Pio Esposito	Inter	Spezia	Loan
19 July 2024	Alberto Paleari	Benevento	Torino	Undisclosed
19 July 2024	Gaetano Castrovilli	Fiorentina	Lazio	Free
19 July 2024	(Spain) Alberto Moreno	(Spain) Villarreal	Como	Free
19 July 2024	(Germany) Lennart Czyborra	Genoa	(Austria) WSG Tirol	Loan
19 July 2024	(Brazil) Charlys	Verona	Cosenza	Loan
19 July 2024	Kevin Lasagna	Verona	Bari	Loan
19 July 2024	Manuel De Luca	Sampdoria	Cremonese	Undisclosed
19 July 2024	Umberto Morleo	Juve Next Gen	Catanzaro	Undisclosed
19 July 2024	Andrea Dini	Crotone	Catanzaro	Undisclosed
19 July 2024	Andrea Sala	Catanzaro	Crotone	Undisclosed
19 July 2024	Gianluca Contini	Cagliari	Virtus Verona	Free
19 July 2024	Alessandro Silvestro	Inter	Foggia	Free
19 July 2024	Mattia Fiorini	Fiorentina	Rimini	Free
20 July 2024	Lorenzo Pirola	Salernitana	(Greece) Olympiacos	Undisclosed
20 July 2024	Fabrizio Caligara	Ascoli	Sassuolo	Undisclosed
20 July 2024	(France) Yannis Nahounou	(France) Nice	Reggiana	Undisclosed
20 July 2024	Christian Celesia	Mantova	Campobasso	Undisclosed
20 July 2024	Nicola Rauti	Torino	Vicenza	Loan
20 July 2024	(Poland) Hubert Idasiak	Napoli	(Poland) ŁKS Łódź	Free
21 July 2024	Simone Romagnoli	Frosinone	Sampdoria	Loan
22 July 2024	Mattia Viti	(France) Nice	Empoli	Loan
22 July 2024	Nicola Dalmonte	Vicenza	Salernitana	Undisclosed
22 July 2024	(Croatia) Antonio Tikvić	Udinese	(England) Watford	Loan
22 July 2024	Edoardo Pierozzi	Fiorentina	Taranto	Loan
22 July 2024	Antonio Cioffi	Napoli	Rimini	Loan
22 July 2024	Andrea Marino	Lazio	Trapani	Free
23 July 2024	(Scotland) Ché Adams	(England) Southampton	Torino	Free
23 July 2024	(Netherlands) Thijs Dallinga	(France) Toulouse	Bologna	Undisclosed
23 July 2024	(United States) Andrija Novakovich	Venezia	Bari	Loan
23 July 2024	Tommaso Fumagalli	Como	Cosenza	Loan
23 July 2024	Marco Curto	Como	Cesena	Loan
23 July 2024	(Argentina) Luka Romero	Milan	(Spain) Alavés	Loan
23 July 2024	(Serbia) Jan-Carlo Simić	Milan	(Belgium) Anderlecht	Undisclosed
23 July 2024	(Brazil) Marcos Antônio	Lazio	(Brazil) São Paulo	Loan
23 July 2024	Leonardo Pedicillo	Spezia	Messina	Undisclosed
24 July 2024	(Iraq) Ali Jasim	(Iraq) Al-Kahrabaa	Como	Loan
24 July 2024	(Albania) Alen Sherri	(Albania) Egnatia	Cagliari	Loan
24 July 2024	Giuseppe Ambrosino	Napoli	Frosinone	Loan
24 July 2024	Davide Bragantini	Verona	Mantova	Undisclosed
24 July 2024	(Cape Verde) Dailon Livramento	(Netherlands) MVV	Verona	Undisclosed
24 July 2024	(Nigeria) Chukwubuikem Ikwuemesi	Salernitana	(Belgium) OH Leuven	Undisclosed
24 July 2024	Alessandro Renzi	Empoli	Arezzo	Undisclosed
25 July 2024	(Austria) Marlon Mustapha	Como	(Germany) Greuther Fürth	Loan
25 July 2024	(Belgium) Zinho Vanheusden	Inter	(Belgium) Mechelen	Loan
25 July 2024	Filippo Pittarello	Cittadella	Catanzaro	Loan
25 July 2024	Niccolò Pierozzi	Fiorentina	Palermo	Undisclosed
25 July 2024	Francesco Di Bartolo	(Belgium) Lommel	Palermo	Undisclosed
25 July 2024	(France) Alexis Blin	Lecce	Palermo	Undisclosed
25 July 2024	(Moldova) Andrei Moțoc	Salernitana	(Greece) Kallithea	Undisclosed
25 July 2024	Mattia Aramu	Genoa	Mantova	Loan
25 July 2024	Thomas Vettorel	Gubbio	Cosenza	Undisclosed
25 July 2024	(Netherlands) Melle Meulensteen	(Netherlands) Vitesse	Sampdoria	Undisclosed
25 July 2024	(Senegal) Fallou Sarr	Cremonese	Spezia	Loan
25 July 2024	Andrea Beghetto	Pisa	Lecco	Loan
25 July 2024	Gennaro Anatriello	Bologna	Messina	Loan
25 July 2024	Gabriele Indragoli	Empoli	Pianese	Undisclosed
26 July 2024	Andrea Colpani	Monza	Fiorentina	Loan
26 July 2024	(Denmark) Jesper Lindstrøm	Napoli	(England) Everton	Loan
26 July 2024	(Sweden) Joseph Ceesay	(Sweden) Malmö	Cesena	Loan
26 July 2024	Riccardo Pagano	Roma	Catanzaro	Loan
26 July 2024	(Poland) Filip Marchwiński	(Poland) Lech Poznań	Lecce	Loan
26 July 2024	Filippo Distefano	Fiorentina	Frosinone	Loan
26 July 2024	Luca Mazzitelli	Frosinone	Como	Loan
26 July 2024	Samuel Blue Mamona	Cremonese	Messina	Loan
26 July 2024	Simone Bastoni	Spezia	Cesena	Undisclosed
26 July 2024	Gaetano Monachello	Mantova	Lumezzane	Undisclosed
26 July 2024	Simone Mazzocchi	Atalanta	Cosenza	Loan
26 July 2024	(Albania) Eljon Toci	Fiorentina	Pro Patria	Loan
26 July 2024	Lorenzo Moretti	Triestina	Cremonese	Undisclosed
26 July 2024	Andrea Moretti	Inter	Triestina	Undisclosed
27 July 2024	(Ghana) Alfred Duncan	Fiorentina	Venezia	Free
27 July 2024	(Slovenia) Samo Matjaž	Inter	(Slovenia) Celje	Undisclosed
27 July 2024	Kelvin Yeboah	Genoa	(United States) MNUFC	Undisclosed
27 July 2024	Giuseppe Fella	Palermo	Cavese	Loan
27 July 2024	Luigi Cherubini	Roma	Carrarese	Loan
27 July 2024	Marco Ruggero	Virtus Verona	Juve Stabia	Undisclosed
28 July 2024	(France) Raphaël Varane	(England) Manchester United	Como	Free
28 July 2024	(Sweden) Samuel Dahl	(Sweden) Djurgården	Roma	Undisclosed
28 July 2024	(Croatia) Stipe Vulikić	Perugia	Sampdoria	Undisclosed
29 July 2024	(France) Yllan Okou	(France) Bastia	Verona	Loan
29 July 2024	Riccardo Calafiori	Bologna	(England) Arsenal	Undisclosed
29 July 2024	Daniele Montevago	Sampdoria	Perugia	Undisclosed
29 July 2024	Lorenzo Da Pozzo	Venezia	Pianese	Loan
30 July 2024	(Norway) Leo Skiri Østigård	Napoli	(France) Rennes	Undisclosed
30 July 2024	(Brazil) Matheus Martins	Udinese	(Brazil) Botafogo	Undisclosed
30 July 2024	(Netherlands) Cas Odenthal	Como	Sassuolo	Undisclosed
30 July 2024	(Argentina) Matías Soulé	Juventus	Roma	€25.6M
30 July 2024	(Spain) Dean Huijsen	Juventus	(England) Bournemouth	€15.2M
30 July 2024	Emil Audero	Sampdoria	Como	Undisclosed
30 July 2024	Pierluigi Gollini	Atalanta	Genoa	Loan
30 July 2024	(Russia) Aleksei Miranchuk	Atalanta	(United States) Atlanta	Undisclosed
30 July 2024	Lorenzo Amatucci	Fiorentina	Salernitana	Loan
30 July 2024	(Sierra Leone) Yayah Kallon	Verona	Salernitana	Loan
30 July 2024	(Cyprus) Grigoris Kastanos	Salernitana	Verona	Loan
30 July 2024	(Croatia) Adrian Šemper	Como	Pisa	Undisclosed
30 July 2024	(Sweden) Elias Nordström	Pisa	(Sweden) Åtvid	Undisclosed
30 July 2024	Jacopo Sardo	Lazio	(Germany) 1. FC Saarbrücken	Free
30 July 2024	Matteo Marchisano	Napoli	Cavese	Loan
30 July 2024	(Romania) Eduard Duțu	Fiorentina	Pineto	Loan
31 July 2024	(Serbia) Strahinja Pavlović	(Austria) RB Salzburg	Milan	Undisclosed
31 July 2024	(Spain) Iker Bravo	(Germany) Bayer Leverkusen	Udinese	Undisclosed
31 July 2024	Mirko Antonucci	Spezia	Cesena	Loan
31 July 2024	(Poland) Szymon Żurkowski	Spezia	Empoli	Loan
31 July 2024	Lorenzo Colombo	Milan	Empoli	Loan
31 July 2024	Daniel Maldini	Milan	Monza	Undisclosed
31 July 2024	(Romania) Louis Munteanu	Fiorentina	(Romania) Cluj	Undisclosed
31 July 2024	(Senegal) Fallou Sene	Fiorentina	Frosinone	Loan
31 July 2024	Riccardo Turicchia	Juventus	Catanzaro	Loan
31 July 2024	Simone Rabbi	SPAL	Cittadella	Undisclosed
31 July 2024	(Bulgaria) Mert Durmush	Pisa	Sestri Levante	Loan
31 July 2024	Davide Mastrantonio	Roma	Milan Futuro	Loan
1 August 2024	Johan Guadagno	Pisa	Campobasso	Loan
1 August 2024	(Croatia) Ante Vuković	Pisa	Vis Pesaro	Loan
1 August 2024	(Portugal) Gonçalo Esteves	(Portugal) Sporting	Udinese	Undisclosed
1 August 2024	(Serbia) Boris Radunović	Cagliari	Bari	Loan
1 August 2024	Vincenzo Onofrietti	(Germany) Borussia Dortmund	Bari	Free
1 August 2024	Vincenzo Onofrietti	Bari	Turris	Loan
1 August 2024	Lorenzo Lucchesi	Fiorentina	Venezia	Loan
1 August 2024	(Cyprus) Christos Kourfalidis	Cagliari	Cosenza	Undisclosed
1 August 2024	Gennaro Tutino	Cosenza	Sampdoria	Loan
1 August 2024	Alessandro Bellemo	Como	Sampdoria	Loan
1 August 2024	Simone Ghidotti	Como	Sampdoria	Loan
1 August 2024	(Cyprus) Nicholas Ioannou	Como	Sampdoria	Loan
1 August 2024	(Germany) Yannik Engelhardt	(Germany) Fortuna Düsseldorf	Como	Loan
1 August 2024	Lorenzo Palmisani	Frosinone	Lucchese	Loan
2 August 2024	Samuele Angori	Empoli	Pisa	Undisclosed
2 August 2024	(Iceland) Óttar Magnús Karlsson	Venezia	SPAL	Undisclosed
2 August 2024	(Ukraine) Artem Dovbyk	(Spain) Girona	Roma	Undisclosed
2 August 2024	Etienne Catena	Cagliari	Virtus Verona	Undisclosed
2 August 2024	(Sweden) Jesper Karlström	(Poland) Lech Poznań	Udinese	Undisclosed
2 August 2024	(Serbia) Mladen Devetak	Palermo	(Croatia) HNK Rijeka	Undisclosed
2 August 2024	(Slovenia) Leo Štulac	Palermo	Reggiana	2-year loan
2 August 2024	(Croatia) Martin Erlić	Sassuolo	Bologna	Undisclosed
2 August 2024	(Slovenia) Tjaš Begić	Parma	Frosinone	Loan
2 August 2024	(Spain) Pablo Rodríguez	Lecce	(Spain) Racing	Loan
2 August 2024	Duccio Degli Innocenti	Empoli	Spezia	Loan
2 August 2024	Destiny Egharevba	Fiorentina	Renate	Undisclosed
3 August 2024	(Belgium) Richie Sagrado	(Belgium) OH Leuven	Venezia	Undisclosed
3 August 2024	Eddy Cabianca	Virtus Verona	Cremonese	Undisclosed
3 August 2024	Luca Gemello	Torino	Perugia	Free
4 August 2024	(Switzerland) Silvan Hefti	Genoa	(Germany) Hamburger SV	Undisclosed
4 August 2024	Lorenzo Ignacchiti	Empoli	Reggiana	Loan
4 August 2024	Salvatore Boccia	Cagliari	Arzignano	Undisclosed
5 August 2024	Giacomo Bonaventura	Fiorentina	(Saudi Arabia) Al-Shabab	Free
5 August 2024	Pietro Boer	Roma	Pianese	Undisclosed
5 August 2024	Semuel Pizzignacco	Feralpisalò	Monza	Loan
5 August 2024	Christian D'Urso	Cosenza	Triestina	Undisclosed
5 August 2024	(France) Aurélien Scheidler	Bari	(Belgium) Dender	Loan
5 August 2024	(Poland) Mateusz Praszelik	Verona	Südtirol	Loan
6 August 2024	(Latvia) Raimonds Krollis	Spezia	Triestina	Loan
6 August 2024	(Netherlands) Jurgen Ekkelenkamp	(Belgium) Antwerp	Udinese	Undisclosed
6 August 2024	(France) Lucien Agoumé	Inter	(Spain) Sevilla	Undisclosed
6 August 2024	Federico Bonazzoli	Salernitana	Cremonese	Undisclosed
6 August 2024	Paolo Ghiglione	Cremonese	Salernitana	Undisclosed
6 August 2024	Tommaso Barbieri	Juventus	Cremonese	Undisclosed
6 August 2024	Gianluca Frabotta	Juventus	(England) West Brom	Undisclosed
6 August 2024	(Netherlands) Hans Hateboer	Atalanta	(France) Rennes	Undisclosed
6 August 2024	(France) Lisandru Tramoni	Pisa	(France) Bastia	Loan
6 August 2024	(Croatia) Ante Jurić	(Croatia) HNK Gorica	Brescia	Undisclosed
7 August 2024	(Argentina) Valentín Carboni	Inter	(France) Marseille	Loan
7 August 2024	Federico Brancolini	Lecce	Empoli	Undisclosed
7 August 2024	(France) Stredair Appuah	(France) Nantes	Palermo	Undisclosed
7 August 2024	(Portugal) Saná Fernandes	Lazio	(Netherlands) NAC Breda	Loan
7 August 2024	Francesco Conti	Sampdoria	Sestri Levante	Loan
7 August 2024	Luigi Pellegrini	Bari	Fidelis Andria	Loan
7 August 2024	Valerio Mantovani	Ascoli	Bari	Loan
7 August 2024	Ivan Varone	Cesena	Ascoli	Undisclosed
7 August 2024	(Netherlands) Tijs Velthuis	(Netherlands) Sparta Rotterdam	Salernitana	Loan
7 August 2024	Matteo Lovato	Salernitana	Sassuolo	Loan
7 August 2024	(France) Grégoire Defrel	Sassuolo	Modena	Free
7 August 2024	Lorenzo Del Piero	Trento	Juve Stabia	Undisclosed
7 August 2024	Fabio Maistro	SPAL	Juve Stabia	Undisclosed
7 August 2024	(Senegal) Demba Thiam	SPAL	Juve Stabia	Loan
7 August 2024	Matteo Bachini	Juve Stabia	SPAL	Undisclosed
7 August 2024	Matteo Esposito	Juve Stabia	Giugliano	Undisclosed
7 August 2024	Flavio Di Dio	Juve Stabia	Audace Cerignola	Loan
8 August 2024	Samuele Damiani	Palermo	Ternana	Loan
8 August 2024	Mateo Retegui	Genoa	Atalanta	Undisclosed
8 August 2024	Ivan Saio	Sampdoria	Pescara	Undisclosed
8 August 2024	Edoardo Pierozzi	Fiorentina	Pescara	Loan
8 August 2024	Simone Ascione	Venezia	Foggia	Loan
8 August 2024	Antonio Raimondo	Bologna	Venezia	Loan
8 August 2024	Simone Corazza	Cesena	Ascoli	Undisclosed
8 August 2024	Raffaele Celia	Ascoli	Cesena	Undisclosed
8 August 2024	(France) Marley Aké	Juventus	(Switzerland) Yverdon	Undisclosed
8 August 2024	Stefano Sensi	Inter	Monza	Free
8 August 2024	(Gabon) Jeremy Oyono	(France) Boulogne	Frosinone	Free
8 August 2024	Manolo Portanova	Genoa	Reggiana	Loan
9 August 2024	Valerio Verre	Sampdoria	Palermo	Free
9 August 2024	Giovanni Bonfanti	Atalanta	Pisa	Loan
9 August 2024	Mario Ravasio	Lucchese	Cittadella	Undisclosed
9 August 2024	Emanuele Pecorino	Juventus	Frosinone	Loan
9 August 2024	Andrea Ceresoli	Atalanta U23	Catanzaro	Loan
9 August 2024	(Denmark) Casper Tengstedt	(Portugal) Benfica	Verona	Loan
9 August 2024	(Argentina) Isaías Delpupo	Cagliari	(Belgium) Sint-Truiden	Undisclosed
9 August 2024	(Slovenia) Žan Žužek	Bari	(Turkey) Gençlerbirliği	Undisclosed
9 August 2024	(Netherlands) Sydney van Hooijdonk	Bologna	Cesena	Undisclosed
9 August 2024	(Poland) Jan Żuberek	Inter	Lecco	Loan
9 August 2024	(Angola) M'Bala Nzola	Fiorentina	(France) Lens	Loan
9 August 2024	(Spain) David de Gea	Unattached	Fiorentina	Free
9 August 2024	Elia Giani	Pisa	(Greece) Kallithea	Loan
9 August 2024	Gabriele Calvani	Genoa	Brescia	Loan
9 August 2024	Luca Di Maggio	Inter	Perugia	Loan
9 August 2024	José Mauri	(Argentina) Sarmiento	Cosenza	Free
10 August 2024	Davide Veroli	Cagliari	Sampdoria	Loan
10 August 2024	(Chile) Alexis Sánchez	Inter	Udinese	Free
11 August 2024	(Netherlands) Jayden Braaf	Verona	Salernitana	Loan
11 August 2024	(France) Andy Pelmard	(France) Clermont	Lecce	Undisclosed
12 August 2024	(Brazil) Emerson Royal	(England) Tottenham	Milan	Undisclosed
12 August 2024	(Serbia) Filip Stanković	Inter	Venezia	Loan
12 August 2024	(Morocco) Youssef Maleh	Lecce	Empoli	Loan
12 August 2024	(The Gambia) Ebrima Darboe	Roma	Frosinone	Loan
12 August 2024	(Morocco) Amir Richardson	(France) Reims	Fiorentina	Undisclosed
12 August 2024	(Denmark) Alexander Lind	(Denmark) Silkeborg	Pisa	Undisclosed
13 August 2024	(Sweden) Pontus Almqvist	(Russia) Rostov	Parma	Loan
13 August 2024	(Argentina) José Luis Palomino	Atalanta	Cagliari	Free
13 August 2024	Giacomo Corona	Palermo	Pontedera	Loan
13 August 2024	Daniele Verde	Spezia	Salernitana	Loan
13 August 2024	Manuel Ricciardi	Avellino	Cosenza	Undisclosed
13 August 2024	(Denmark) Malthe Højholt	(Denmark) AaB	Pisa	Undisclosed
13 August 2024	(Algeria) Mehdi Léris	(England) Stoke City	Pisa	Undisclosed
13 August 2024	Giuseppe Carriero	Cittadella	Trapani	Undisclosed
14 August 2024	(England) Brooke Norton-Cuffy	(England) Arsenal	Genoa	Undisclosed
14 August 2024	(Romania) Mihai Popa	Torino	(Romania) Cluj	Loan
14 August 2024	Antonio Donnarumma	Padova	Torino	Free
14 August 2024	Matteo Cancellieri	Lazio	Parma	Loan
14 August 2024	(Norway) Ola Solbakken	Roma	Empoli	Loan
14 August 2024	(Spain) Jan Oliveras	Roma	(Croatia) Dinamo Zagreb	Loan
14 August 2024	(Mali) Lassana Coulibaly	Salernitana	Lecce	Undisclosed
14 August 2024	(The Gambia) Alieu Fadera	(Belgium) Genk	Como	Undisclosed
14 August 2024	(United States) Nicholas Gioacchini	Como	(United States) Cincinnati	6-month loan
14 August 2024	Alessandro Mercati	Sassuolo	(Greece) Kallithea	Undisclosed
14 August 2024	Alessandro Livieri	Pisa	Ascoli	Loan
14 August 2024	Nikola Sekulov	Juventus	Sampdoria	Loan
14 August 2024	(Poland) Wojciech Szczęsny	Juventus	Unattached	Free
15 August 2024	(Spain) Siren Diao	Atalanta	(Spain) Granada	Loan
15 August 2024	(Brazil) Natan	Napoli	(Spain) Betis	Loan
15 August 2024	Domenico Frare	Cittadella	Triestina	Loan
16 August 2024	Andrea Pinamonti	Sassuolo	Genoa	Loan
16 August 2024	Marco Brescianini	Frosinone	Atalanta	Loan
16 August 2024	Fabio Rispoli	Como	Virtus Verona	Loan
16 August 2024	(Senegal) Boulaye Dia	Salernitana	Lazio	2-year loan
16 August 2024	(Iceland) Albert Guðmundsson	Genoa	Fiorentina	Loan
16 August 2024	(Norway) Emil Konradsen Ceide	Sassuolo	(Norway) Rosenborg	Loan
17 August 2024	Samuel Giovane	Atalanta	Carrarese	Loan
17 August 2024	(France) Youssouf Fofana	Monaco	Milan	Undisclosed
17 August 2024	(Spain) Jordi Mboula	Verona	(Portugal) Gil Vicente	Undisclosed
17 August 2024	(Croatia) Borna Sosa	(Netherlands) Ajax	Torino	Loan
17 August 2024	(Sweden) Joel Voelkerling Persson	Lecce	(Sweden) Värnamo	6-month loan
17 August 2024	(Albania) Marash Kumbulla	Roma	(Spain) Espanyol	Loan
17 August 2024	Fabio Ruggeri	Lazio	Salernitana	Loan
17 August 2024	(Uruguay) Agustín Álvarez	Sassuolo	(Spain) Elche	Loan
17 August 2024	(Colombia) Andrés Tello	Catania	Salernitana	Loan
18 August 2024	(Serbia) Lazar Samardžić	Udinese	Atalanta	Loan
19 August 2024	(Sweden) Jens Cajuste	Napoli	(England) Ipswich Town	Loan
19 August 2024	(Brazil) Ruan Tressoldi	Sassuolo	(Brazil) São Paulo	Loan
20 August 2024	Marco Nasti	Milan	Cremonese	Undisclosed
20 August 2024	(Senegal) Demba Seck	Torino	Catanzaro	Loan
20 August 2024	(Poland) Marcin Listkowski	Lecce	(Poland) Jagiellonia Białystok	Undisclosed
20 August 2024	(Algeria) Mohamed Farès	Lazio	(Greece) Panserraikos	Loan
20 August 2024	Roberto Soriano	Unattached	Salernitana	Free
20 August 2024	(France) Jeff Reine-Adélaïde	(Belgium) RWDM	Salernitana	Undisclosed
20 August 2024	(France) Maxime Leverbe	Pisa	Vicenza	Undisclosed
21 August 2024	(France) Pierre Kalulu	Milan	Juventus	Loan
21 August 2024	(France) Issiaka Kamate	Inter	(Portugal) AVS	Loan
21 August 2024	Tommaso Cassandro	Como	Catanzaro	Loan
21 August 2024	Daniele Rugani	Juventus	(Netherlands) Ajax	Loan
21 August 2024	(Finland) Henri Salomaa	Lecce	Casertana	Loan
21 August 2024	(Brazil) David Neres	(Portugal) Benfica	Napoli	Loan
21 August 2024	(Netherlands) Simon Graves Jensen	Palermo	(Netherlands) PEC Zwolle	Loan
21 August 2024	(Netherlands) Mohamed Sankoh	(Germany) VfB Stuttgart	Cosenza	Loan
21 August 2024	Giovanni Corradini	Spezia	Ternana	Loan
21 August 2024	Davide Biraschi	(Turkey) Karagümrük	Frosinone	Free
21 August 2024	Lorenzo Lonardi	Südtirol	Pescara	Loan
22 August 2024	Raoul Bellanova	Torino	Atalanta	Undisclosed
22 August 2024	(Norway) Marcus Holmgren Pedersen	(Netherlands) Feyenoord	Torino	Loan
22 August 2024	Hans Nicolussi Caviglia	Juventus	Venezia	Loan
22 August 2024	Alessandro Di Pardo	Cagliari	Modena	Loan
22 August 2024	Federico Valietti	Genoa	Trapani	Loan
22 August 2024	Seydou Fini	Genoa	(Netherlands) Excelsior	Loan
22 August 2024	(Serbia) Uroš Račić	Sassuolo	(England) West Brom	Loan
23 August 2024	Stefano Turati	Sassuolo	Monza	Loan
23 August 2024	(Mali) El Bilal Touré	Atalanta	(Germany) VfB Stuttgart	Loan
23 August 2024	(Sweden) Demirel Hodžić	Bologna	Milan Futuro	Undisclosed
23 August 2024	(Spain) Sergi Roberto	(Spain) Barcelona	Como	Free
23 August 2024	(Romania) Răzvan Sava	(Romania) Cluj	Udinese	Undisclosed
23 August 2024	(Romania) Horațiu Moldovan	(Spain) Atlético Madrid	Sassuolo	Loan
23 August 2024	Edoardo Iannoni	Perugia	Sassuolo	Undisclosed
23 August 2024	Joshua Tenkorang	Cremonese	Lumezzane	Loan
23 August 2024	(Denmark) David Stückler	Cremonese	Giana Erminio	Loan
24 August 2024	Federico Zuccon	Atalanta	Juve Stabia	Loan
24 August 2024	Tommaso Pobega	Milan	Bologna	Loan
24 August 2024	(Uruguay) Martín Satriano	Inter	(France) Lens	Loan
24 August 2024	Jacopo Da Riva	Atalanta	Foggia	Loan
24 August 2024	Salvatore Sirigu	(Turkey) Karagümrük	Palermo	Free
25 August 2024	Fabio Miretti	Juventus	Genoa	Loan
25 August 2024	(Germany) Faride Alidou	(Germany) Eintracht Frankfurt	Verona	Loan
25 August 2024	(Argentina) Máximo Perrone	(Argentina) Real Madrid	Como	Loan
25 August 2024	(Argentina) Nico Paz	(Spain) Real Madrid	Como	Undisclosed
25 August 2024	(Argentina) Nicolás González	Fiorentina	Juventus	Loan
25 August 2024	(Czech Republic) Daniel Samek	Lecce	(Czech Republic) Hradec Králové	Loan
25 August 2024	Pierluca Luciani	Frosinone	Messina	Undisclosed
26 August 2024	(Colombia) Juan Cuadrado	Inter	Atalanta	Free
26 August 2024	(Turkey) Rayyan Baniya	(Turkey) Trabzonspor	Palermo	Loan
26 August 2024	Alessandro Sorrentino	Monza	Frosinone	Loan
26 August 2024	(Equatorial Guinea) José Machín	Monza	Frosinone	Loan
26 August 2024	(France) Gaby Jean	(France) Annecy	Lecce	Undisclosed
26 August 2024	(Croatia) Ante Rebić	Unattached	Lecce	Free
26 August 2024	Riccardo Bassanini	Piacenza	Pisa	Undisclosed
26 August 2024	(Iceland) Hjörtur Hermannsson	Pisa	Carrarese	Undisclosed
27 August 2024	(France) Valentin Gendrey	Lecce	(Germany) TSG Hoffenheim	Undisclosed
27 August 2024	(Portugal) Francisco Conceição	(Portugal) Porto	Juventus	Undisclosed
27 August 2024	Alessandro Fontanarosa	Inter	Reggiana	Loan
27 August 2024	Giovanni Leoni	Sampdoria	Parma	Undisclosed
27 August 2024	(Portugal) Rui Patricio	Roma	Atalanta	Free
27 August 2024	(Argentina) Juan Musso	Atalanta	(Spain) Atlético Madrid	Loan
27 August 2024	(Morocco) Walid Cheddira	Napoli	(Spain) Espanyol	Loan
27 August 2024	(United States) Tanner Tessmann	Venezia	(France) Lyon	Undisclosed
27 August 2024	(Sweden) Amin Sarr	(France) Lyon	Verona	Loan
27 August 2024	(France) Frédéric Guilbert	(France) Strasbourg	Lecce	Undisclosed
27 August 2024	Nicolò Buso	Lecco	Catanzaro	Loan
27 August 2024	(England) Samuel Iling-Junior	(England) Aston Villa	Bologna	Loan
27 August 2024	(Saudi Arabia) Saud Abdulhamid	(Saudi Arabia) Al Hilal	Roma	Undisclosed
27 August 2024	(Poland) Szymon Włodarczyk	(Austria) Sturm Graz	Salernitana	Loan
28 August 2024	(France) Antoine Joujou	(France) Le Havre	Parma	Undisclosed
28 August 2024	(France) Antoine Joujou	Parma	(France) Le Havre	Loan
28 August 2024	(Ivory Coast) Odilon Kossounou	(Germany) Bayer Leverkusen	Atalanta	Loan
28 August 2024	(Netherlands) Teun Koopmeiners	Atalanta	Juventus	€51.3M
28 August 2024	(Bosnia and Herzegovina) Tarik Muharemović	Juventus	Sassuolo	Loan
28 August 2024	Alessandro Pio Riccio	Juventus	Sampdoria	Undisclosed
28 August 2024	(Spain) Kaleb Jiménez	Salernitana	Catania	Undisclosed
28 August 2024	Alessandro Raimo	Carrarese	Catania	Undisclosed
28 August 2024	Devid Eugene Bouah	Catania	Carrarese	Undisclosed
28 August 2024	(France) Yacine Adli	Milan	Fiorentina	Loan
28 August 2024	(Argentina) Benjamín Domínguez	(Argentina) Gimnasia LP	Bologna	Undisclosed
28 August 2024	Roberto Ogunseye	Cesena	Arezzo	Loan
28 August 2024	(Germany) Marc-Oliver Kempf	(Germany) Hertha BSC	Como	Undisclosed
28 August 2024	(Belgium) Joël Schingtienne	(Belgium) OH Leuven	Venezia	Undisclosed
29 August 2024	(France) Maxime Lopez	Sassuolo	(France) Paris	Undisclosed
29 August 2024	(Uruguay) Facundo González	Juventus	(Netherlands) Feyenoord	Loan
29 August 2024	Federico Chiesa	Juventus	(England) Liverpool	€12M
29 August 2024	Ismael Konate	Cagliari	Empoli	Undisclosed
29 August 2024	Francesco Donati	Empoli	Ternana	Undisclosed
29 August 2024	(England) Tino Anjorin	(England) Chelsea	Empoli	Undisclosed
29 August 2024	(Belgium) Romelu Lukaku	(England) Chelsea	Napoli	Undisclosed
29 August 2024	(Ivory Coast) Vakoun Issouf Bayo	(England) Watford	Udinese	Undisclosed
29 August 2024	(Ivory Coast) Vakoun Issouf Bayo	Udinese	(England) Watford	Loan
29 August 2024	Lorenzo Di Stefano	Modena	Campobasso	Loan
29 August 2024	(Belgium) Lukas Mondele	Modena	Pergolettese	Loan
29 August 2024	Niccolò Chiorra	Empoli	Carrarese	Loan
29 August 2024	Gabriele Guarino	Empoli	Carrarese	Loan
29 August 2024	Mattia De Sciglio	Juventus	Empoli	Loan
29 August 2024	Andrea Cisco	Südtirol	Perugia	Loan
29 August 2024	Nunzio Lella	Venezia	Bari	Loan
29 August 2024	(Chile) Guillermo Maripán	Monaco	Torino	Undisclosed
29 August 2024	(Hungary) Krisztofer Horváth	Torino	(Hungary) Újpest	Undisclosed
29 August 2024	(Portugal) Gonçalo Esteves	Udinese	(Switzerland) Yverdon	Loan
30 August 2024	Pietro Pellegri	Torino	Empoli	Loan
30 August 2024	(Georgia (country)) Saba Sazonov	Torino	Empoli	Loan
30 August 2024	(Poland) Sebastian Walukiewicz	Empoli	Torino	Undisclosed
30 August 2024	(Argentina) Tomás Palacios	(Argentina) Independiente Rivadavia	Inter	Undisclosed
30 August 2024	(Argentina) Franco Carboni	Inter	Venezia	Loan
30 August 2024	Enoch Owusu	Inter	Novara	Loan
30 August 2024	Alessandro Plizzari	Pescara	Venezia	Undisclosed
30 August 2024	Alessandro Plizzari	Venezia	Pescara	Loan
30 August 2024	(Ecuador) John Yeboah	(Poland) Raków Częstochowa	Venezia	Undisclosed
30 August 2024	Nicholas Pierini	Venezia	Sassuolo	Undisclosed
30 August 2024	(Belgium) Alexis Saelemaekers	Milan	Roma	Loan
30 August 2024	(England) Tammy Abraham	Roma	Milan	Loan
30 August 2024	(Netherlands) Silvano Vos	(Netherlands) Ajax	Milan	Undisclosed
30 August 2024	(France) Manu Koné	(Germany) Borussia Mönchengladbach	Roma	Loan
30 August 2024	Edoardo Bove	Roma	Fiorentina	Loan
30 August 2024	Danilo Cataldi	Lazio	Fiorentina	Loan
30 August 2024	Nicolò Casale	Lazio	Bologna	Loan
30 August 2024	(France) Samuel Gigot	(France) Marseille	Lazio	Loan
30 August 2024	(Netherlands) Mitchel Bakker	Atalanta	(France) Lille	Loan
30 August 2024	(Scotland) Scott McTominay	(England) Manchester United	Napoli	Undisclosed
30 August 2024	(Scotland) Billy Gilmour	(England) Brighton	Napoli	Undisclosed
30 August 2024	Gianluca Gaetano	Napoli	Cagliari	Loan
30 August 2024	(Mexico) Carlo Soldati	(Mexico) Querétaro	Cagliari	Loan
30 August 2024	(Belgium) Ignace Van Der Brempt	(Austria) RB Salzburg	Como	Loan
30 August 2024	Kevin Bonifazi	Bologna	Lecce	Loan
30 August 2024	(Albania) Stiven Shpendi	Empoli	Carrarese	Loan
30 August 2024	(Venezuela) Ernesto Torregrossa	Pisa	Salernitana	Undisclosed
30 August 2024	(Croatia) Domagoj Bradarić	Salernitana	Verona	Loan
30 August 2024	(Australia) Ajdin Hrustic	Verona	Salernitana	Undisclosed
30 August 2024	(Poland) Paweł Jaroszyński	(Poland) Cracovia	Salernitana	Undisclosed
30 August 2024	Gian Marco Ferrari	Sassuolo	Salernitana	Free
30 August 2024	Antonio Pio Iervolino	Salernitana	Taranto	Loan
30 August 2024	(Senegal) Mamadou Coulibaly	Salernitana	Catanzaro	Undisclosed
30 August 2024	Alessio Curcio	Catanzaro	Ternana	Undisclosed
30 August 2024	(Belgium) Mandela Keita	(Belgium) Antwerp	Parma	Undisclosed
30 August 2024	Rachid Kouda	Spezia	Parma	Undisclosed
30 August 2024	Rachid Kouda	Parma	Spezia	Loan
30 August 2024	(Croatia) Antonio Čolak	Parma	Spezia	Undisclosed
30 August 2024	Alessandro Bianco	Fiorentina	Monza	Loan
30 August 2024	(Germany) Robin Gosens	(Germany) Union Berlin	Fiorentina	Loan
30 August 2024	(Argentina) Matías Agustín Moreno	(Argentina) Belgrano	Fiorentina	Undisclosed
30 August 2024	Davide Bettella	Monza	Frosinone	Undisclosed
30 August 2024	Federico Ceccherini	Verona	Cremonese	Undisclosed
30 August 2024	(Netherlands) Elayis Tavşan	Verona	Cesena	Loan
30 August 2024	(France) Mathis Lambourde	(France) Rennais	Verona	Undisclosed
30 August 2024	(France) Arthur Atta	(France) Metz	Udinese	Loan
30 August 2024	(France) Isaak Touré	(France) Lorient	Udinese	Loan
30 August 2024	(Angola) Rui Modesto	(Sweden) AIK	Udinese	Undisclosed
30 August 2024	(Republic of Ireland) Festy Ebosele	Udinese	(England) Watford	Loan
30 August 2024	(Argentina) Nehuén Pérez	Udinese	(Portugal) Porto	Loan
30 August 2024	(Mali) Coli Saco	Napoli	Bari	Loan
30 August 2024	Andrea Favilli	Genoa	Bari	Loan
30 August 2024	Alessandro Tripaldelli	SPAL	Bari	Undisclosed
30 August 2024	Giacomo Ricci	Bari	Cosenza	Undisclosed
30 August 2024	Gregorio Morachioli	Bari	Juve Stabia	Undisclosed
30 August 2024	Andrea Astrologo	Bari	AlbinoLeffe	Undisclosed
30 August 2024	Jérémie Broh	Palermo	Padova	Undisclosed
30 August 2024	(France) Jérémy Le Douaron	(France) Brest	Palermo	Undisclosed
30 August 2024	Marco D'Alessandro	Monza	Catanzaro	Undisclosed
30 August 2024	Andrea La Mantia	SPAL	Catanzaro	Undisclosed
30 August 2024	Frank Tsadjout	Cremonese	Frosinone	Loan
30 August 2024	Anthony Partipilo	Parma	Frosinone	Undisclosed
30 August 2024	Giuseppe Caso	Frosinone	Modena	Undisclosed
30 August 2024	Stefano Gori	Juve Next Gen	Spezia	Loan
30 August 2024	Luis Hasa	Juve Next Gen	Lecce	Undisclosed
30 August 2024	Giacomo Faticanti	Lecce	Juve Next Gen	Loan
30 August 2024	Luca Strizzolo	Modena	Cosenza	Loan
30 August 2024	Marco Silvestri	Udinese	Sampdoria	Undisclosed
30 August 2024	Stefano Piccinini	Sassuolo	Cittadella	Undisclosed
30 August 2024	(Albania) Nedim Bajrami	Sassuolo	(Scotland) Rangers	Undisclosed
30 August 2024	Paolo Gozzi	Genoa	(France) Troyes	Undisclosed
30 August 2024	Alessandro Dellavalle	Torino	Modena	Loan
30 August 2024	Luca Tremolada	Modena	Ascoli	Loan
30 August 2024	Romeo Giovannini	Modena	Gubbio	Loan
30 August 2024	Ousmane Niang	Modena	Clodiense	Loan
30 August 2024	(Croatia) Roko Vukušić	Modena	Clodiense	Loan
30 August 2024	(Morocco) Shady Oukhadda	Modena	Benevento	Loan
30 August 2024	Francesco Mezzoni	Napoli	Perugia	Loan
30 August 2024	Daniele Mignanelli	Juve Stabia	SPAL	Undisclosed
30 August 2024	Luca Valzania	Cremonese	Pescara	Undisclosed
31 August 2024	(Netherlands) Rick Karsdorp	Roma	(Netherlands) PSV	Free
31 August 2024	(Morocco) Sofyan Amrabat	Fiorentina	(Turkey) Fenerbahçe	Loan
31 August 2024	(Republic of Ireland) Liam Kerrigan	Como	(Belgium) Beveren	Loan
2 September 2024	(Portugal) Leonardo Buta	Udinese	(Portugal) Moreirense	Undisclosed
2 September 2024	(Portugal) Vivaldo Semedo	Udinese	(Portugal) Vizela	Loan
2 September 2024	(Portugal) João Costa	Roma	(Saudi Arabia) Ettifaq	Undisclosed
2 September 2024	(England) Chris Smalling	Roma	(Saudi Arabia) Al-Fayha	Undisclosed
2 September 2024	(Spain) Mario Hermoso	(Spain) Atlético Madrid	Roma	Free
2 September 2024	(Greece) Pantelis Chatzidiakos	Cagliari	(Denmark) Copenhagen	Loan
2 September 2024	(Denmark) Julius Beck	Spezia	(Denmark) Esbjerg	Loan
2 September 2024	(Belgium) Vivaldo Semedo	Parma	(Czech Republic) Sparta Prague	Undisclosed
3 September 2024	(Portugal) Tiago Djaló	Juventus	(Portugal) Porto	Loan
3 September 2024	(Portugal) Domingos Quina	Udinese	(Cyprus) Pafos	Undisclosed
3 September 2024	(Serbia) Nemanja Radonjić	Torino	(Serbia) Red Star Belgrade	Undisclosed
3 September 2024	(Belgium) Mats Lemmens	Lecce	(Belgium) Lokeren	Loan
4 September 2024	(Germany) Mats Hummels	Unattached	Roma	Free
4 September 2024	(Slovakia) Peter Kováčik	Como	(Poland) Jagiellonia Białystok	Loan
4 September 2024	(Nigeria) Victor Osimhen	Napoli	(Turkey) Galatasaray	Loan
6 September 2024	(Serbia) Stefan Mitrović	Verona	(Belgium) OH Leuven	Loan
6 September 2024	(Belgium) Sekou Diawara	Udinese	(Belgium) Francs Borains	Undisclosed
6 September 2024	(Poland) Daniel Mikołajewski	Parma	(Poland) Zagłębie Lubin	Loan
7 September 2024	(France) Ange N'Guessan	Torino	(Slovenia) Bravo	Loan
7 September 2024	(Croatia) Josip Brekalo	Fiorentina	(Turkey) Kasımpaşa	Loan
7 September 2024	(Czech Republic) Antonín Barák	Fiorentina	(Turkey) Kasımpaşa	Loan
7 September 2024	(Slovenia) Luka Krajnc	Catanzaro	(Slovenia) Maribor	Undisclosed
9 September 2024	(Serbia) Filip Kostić	Juventus	(Turkey) Fenerbahçe	Loan
9 September 2024	(Netherlands) Jay Enem	Venezia	(Cyprus) Omonia 29M	Loan
9 September 2024	(Poland) Mateusz Łęgowski	Salernitana	(Switzerland) Yverdon	Loan
10 September 2024	(Nigeria) David Okereke	Cremonese	(Turkey) Gaziantep	Loan
11 September 2024	Eddie Salcedo	Inter	(Greece) OFI	Loan
11 September 2024	(Albania) Marvin Çuni	Frosinone	(Russia) Rubin Kazan	Undisclosed
14 September 2024	(Serbia) Mihajlo Ilić	Bologna	(Serbia) Partizan	Loan
18 September 2024	Davide Marfella	Unattached	Bari	Free
