= 2024–25 Palermo FC season =

Palermo
2024–25 season
- Owner: City Football Group (94,94%); Hera Hora S.r.l. (5%); Associazione Amici Rosanero (0,06%)
- Chairman: Dario Mirri
- Manager: Alessio Dionisi
- Stadium: Renzo Barbera
- Serie B: 8th
- Play-offs: Preliminary round
- Coppa Italia: Second round
- Top goalscorer: League: Matteo Brunori; Joel Pohjanpalo (9 goals each); All: Matteo Brunori; Joel Pohjanpalo (9 goals each)
- Highest home attendance: 25,787 (v Cosenza)
- Lowest home attendance: 16,645 (v Modena)
- Average home league attendance: 20,730
- Biggest win: 3–0 (v Cosenza, away)
- Biggest defeat: 5–0 (v Napoli, away)
Home colours	Away colours	Third colours

The 2024–25 season was the 96th in the history of Palermo FC and the club's third consecutive season in Serie B. In addition to the domestic league, the team participated in the Coppa Italia.

== Players ==
=== First team squad ===
As of 7 February 2025

Note: Flags indicate national team as defined under FIFA eligibility rules; some limited exceptions apply. Players may hold more than one non-FIFA nationality.

No.	Pos.	Nation	Player
1	GK	ITA	Sebastiano Desplanches
3	DF	USA	Kristoffer Lund
4	DF	TUR	Rayyan Baniya (on loan from Trabzonspor)
6	MF	FRA	Claudio Gomes
7	FW	ITA	Francesco Di Mariano
8	MF	ITA	Jacopo Segre
9	FW	ITA	Matteo Brunori (Captain)
10	MF	ITA	Filippo Ranocchia
11	FW	ITA	Roberto Insigne
12	GK	IDN	Emil Audero (on loan from Como)
14	MF	SRB	Aljosa Vasic
16	GK	SEN	Alfred Gomis
17	FW	ITA	Federico Di Francesco
19	FW	FIN	Joel Pohjanpalo

No.	Pos.	Nation	Player
20	FW	FRA	Thomas Henry (on loan from Hellas Verona)
21	FW	FRA	Jérémy Le Douaron
23	DF	FRA	Salim Diakité
24	DF	ITA	Giangiacomo Magnani
25	DF	ITA	Alessio Buttaro
26	MF	ITA	Valerio Verre
27	DF	ITA	Niccolò Pierozzi
28	MF	FRA	Alexis Blin
32	DF	ITA	Pietro Ceccaroni
43	DF	GRE	Dimitrios Nikolaou
46	GK	ITA	Salvatore Sirigu
63	GK	ITA	Francesco Cutrona
77	GK	ITA	Francesco Di Bartolo

=== Players transferred out during the season ===
Note: Flags indicate national team as defined under FIFA eligibility rules; some limited exceptions apply. Players may hold more than one non-FIFA nationality.

No.	Pos.	Nation	Player
5	DF	ITA	Fabio Lucioni (released)
12	GK	ITA	Manfredi Nespola (on loan to Flaminia)
18	DF	ROU	Ionuț Nedelcearu (out to Akron Tolyatti)
19	FW	FRA	Stredair Appuah (on loan to Valenciennes)
29	DF	POL	Patryk Peda (on loan to Juve Stabia)

No.	Pos.	Nation	Player
30	MF	BIH	Dario Šarić (on loan to Cesena)
—	FW	ITA	Giacomo Corona (on loan to Pontedera)
—	DF	DEN	Simon Graves Jensen (on loan to PEC Zwolle)
—	MF	ITA	Jérémie Broh (out to Padova)

== Transfers ==
=== Summer 2024 ===
In
Date	Pos.	Name	From	Type	Fee	Ref.
1 July 2024	DF	(Serbia) Mladen Devetak	(Croatia) Istra	End of loan	Free	
1 July 2024	DF	(Poland) Patryk Peda	(Italy) SPAL	End of loan	Free	
1 July 2024	MF	(Italy) Jérémie Broh	(Italy) Südtirol	End of loan	Free	
1 July 2024	MF	(Italy) Samuele Damiani	(Italy) Juventus	End of loan	Free	
1 July 2024	MF	(Bosnia and Herzegovina) Dario Šarić	(Turkey) Antalyaspor	End of loan	Free	
1 July 2024	FW	(Italy) Giacomo Corona	(Italy) Empoli	End of loan	Free	
1 July 2024	FW	(Italy) Giuseppe Fella	(Italy) Latina	End of loan	Free	
6 July 2024	GK	(Senegal) Alfred Gomis	(France) Rennes	Permanent deal	Undisclosed	
14 July 2024	DF	(Greece) Dimitrios Nikolaou	(Italy) Spezia	Permanent deal	€1.6M	
16 July 2024	FW	(France) Thomas Henry	(Italy) Hellas Verona	Loan with a conditional obligation to buy	€0.28M	
25 July 2024	GK	(Italy) Francesco Di Bartolo	(Belgium) Lommel	Permanent deal	Undisclosed	
25 July 2024	DF	(Italy) Niccolò Pierozzi	(Italy) Fiorentina	Permanent deal	€1M	
25 July 2024	MF	(France) Alexis Blin	(Italy) Lecce	Permanent deal	€1.5M	
7 August 2024	FW	(France) Stredair Appuah	(France) Nantes	Permanent deal	€1.5M	
9 August 2024	MF	(Italy) Valerio Verre	(Italy) Sampdoria	Permanent deal	Undisclosed	
24 August 2024	GK	(Italy) Salvatore Sirigu	Unattached (Note: Previous club: Karagümrük.)	Permanent deal	Free	
26 August 2024	DF	(Turkey) Rayyan Baniya	(Turkey) Trabzonspor	Loan with an option to buy	€0.45M	
30 August 2024	FW	(France) Jérémy Le Douaron	(France) Brest	Permanent deal	€4M	
Out
Date	Pos.	Name	To	Type	Fee	Ref.
1 July 2024	MF	(Senegal) Mamadou Coulibaly	(Italy) Salernitana	End of loan	Free	
1 July 2024	MF	(Scotland) Liam Henderson	(Italy) Empoli	End of loan	Free	
1 July 2024	FW	(Italy) Leonardo Mancuso	(Italy) Monza	End of loan	Free	
1 July 2024	FW	(Ivory Coast) Chaka Traorè	(Italy) Milan	End of loan	Free	
1 July 2024	GK	(Bosnia and Herzegovina) Adnan Kanurić	Unattached (Note: Joined Lafnitz after release.)	Contract expired	Free	
1 July 2024	DF	(Italy) Ivan Marconi	Unattached (Note: Joined Virtus Entella after release.)	Contract expired	Free	
15 July 2024	DF	(Italy) Giuseppe Aurelio	(Italy) Spezia	Loan with an option to buy	Free	
15 July 2024	FW	(Italy) Edoardo Soleri	(Italy) Spezia	Permanent deal	Undisclosed	
16 July 2024	GK	(Italy) Mirko Pigliacelli	(Italy) Catanzaro	Permanent deal	Undisclosed	
27 July 2024	FW	(Italy) Giuseppe Fella	(Italy) Cavese	Loan with an obligation to buy	Free	
2 August 2024	DF	(Serbia) Mladen Devetak	(Croatia) Rijeka	Permanent deal	Undisclosed	
2 August 2024	MF	(Slovenia) Leo Štulac	(Italy) Reggiana	Two-year loan	Free	
8 August 2024	MF	(Italy) Samuele Damiani	(Italy) Ternana	Loan with an obligation to buy	Free	
13 August 2024	FW	(Italy) Giacomo Corona	(Italy) Pontedera	Loan	Free	
21 August 2024	DF	(Denmark) Simon Graves Jensen	(Netherlands) PEC Zwolle	Loan with an option to buy	Free	
30 August 2024	MF	(Italy) Jérémie Broh	(Italy) Padova	Permanent deal	Undisclosed	

=== Winter 2025 ===
In
Date	Pos.	Name	From	Type	Fee	Ref.
28 January 2025	DF	(Italy) Giangiacomo Magnani	(Italy) Hellas Verona	Permanent deal	€0.6M	
3 February 2025	GK	(Indonesia) Emil Audero	(Italy) Como	Loan	Free	
3 February 2025	FW	(Finland) Joel Pohjanpalo	(Italy) Venezia	Permanent deal	€4.75M	
Out
Date	Pos.	Name	To	Type	Fee	Ref.
20 November 2024	DF	(Italy) Fabio Lucioni	Unattached (Note: Joined Frosinone after release.)	Released	Free	
4 January 2025	GK	(Italy) Manfredi Nespola	(Italy) Flaminia	Loan	Free	
25 January 2025	DF	(Poland) Patryk Peda	(Italy) Juve Stabia	Loan	Free	
31 January 2025	MF	(Bosnia and Herzegovina) Dario Šarić	(Italy) Cesena	Loan	Free	
31 January 2025	FW	(France) Stredair Appuah	(France) Valenciennes	Loan	Free	
7 February 2025	DF	(Romania) Ionuț Nedelcearu	(Russia) Akron Tolyatti	Permanent deal	Undisclosed	

== Pre-season and friendlies ==
Win Draw Loss Fixtures

13 July 2024 Friendly	Palermo	10–0	(Italy) Sondrio amateur local team	Livigno
15:00 CEST (UTC+2)	Ranocchia 15'; Brunori 23'; Insigne 29' (pen.), 30'; Corona 49', 89'; Di Mariano 64'; Fella 70'; Di Francesco 84'; Buttaro 87'	Report		Stadium: Centro Sportivo "Aquagranda"

17 July 2024 Friendly	Palermo	0–1	(Switzerland) Rapperswil-Jona	Livigno
15:00 CEST (UTC+2)		Report	Wiskemann 82'	Stadium: Centro Sportivo "Aquagranda"

20 July 2024 Friendly	Monza (Italy)	0–1	Palermo	Temù
16:30 CEST (UTC+2)		Report	Di Francesco 8'	Stadium: Campo sportivo comumale Referee: (Italy) Gianluca Manganiello

26 July 2024 Friendly	Leicester City (England)	0–1	Palermo	Chesterfield
19:00 BST		Report	Di Francesco 60'	Stadium: SMH Group Stadium; Referee: (England) Nicholas Hopton

3 August 2024 Friendly	Oxford United (England)	0–2	Palermo	Oxford
15:00 BST		Report	Šarić 62'; Insigne 64'	Stadium: Kassam Stadium; Attendance: 3,539; Referee: (England) Matthew Donohue

== Competitions ==
=== Overall record ===
Competition	First match	Last match	Starting round	Final position	Record							
Competition	First match	Last match	Starting round	Final position	Pld	W	D	L	GF	GA	GD	Win %
Serie B	16 August 2024	13 May 2025	Matchday 1	8th place	38	14	10	14	52	43	+9	36.84
Play-offs	17 May 2023		Preliminary round	Preliminary round	1	0	0	1	0	1	−1	0.00
Coppa Italia	11 August 2024	26 September 2024	First round	Second round	2	1	0	1	1	5	−4	50.00
Total					41	15	10	16	53	49	+4	36.59

Source: Palermo F.C.

=== Serie B ===
==== League table ====
Pos	Team	Pld	W	D	L	GF	GA	GD	Pts	Promotion, qualification or relegation
6	Catanzaro	38	11	20	7	51	45	+6	53	Promotion play-offs preliminary round
7	Cesena	38	14	11	13	46	47	−1	53	Promotion play-offs preliminary round
8	Palermo	38	14	10	14	52	43	+9	52	Promotion play-offs preliminary round
9	Bari	38	10	18	10	41	40	+1	48	
10	Südtirol	38	12	10	16	50	57	−7	46	

Source: Serie BKT
Rules for classification: 1) Points; 2) Head-to-head points; 3) Head-to-head goal difference; 4) Goal difference; 5) Goals scored; 6) Draw.
(Note: Head-to-head record is used only after all the matches between the teams in question have been played)

==== Results summary ====
Overall								Home						Away					
Pld	W	D	L	GF	GA	GD	Pts	W	D	L	GF	GA	GD	W	D	L	GF	GA	GD
38	14	10	14	52	43	+9	52	8	5	6	26	19	+7	6	5	8	26	24	+2

Source: Soccerway

==== Results by round ====
Round	1	2	3	4	5	6	7	8	9	10	11	12	13	14	15	16	17	18	19	20	21	22	23	24	25	26	27	28	29	30	31	32	33	34	35	36	37	38
Ground	T	T	T	C	T	C	T	C	T	C	T	C	T	C	C	T	C	T	C	T	C	C	T	C	T	C	T	C	T	C	T	C	T	C (Note: Played after round 38.)	T	C	T	C
Result	L	L	W	D	W	D	W	L	D	W	D	L	D	D	W	L	L	L	W	L	W	W	L	L	D	D	W	W	D	L	W	W	L	D	W	L	L	W
Position	19	20	16	15	11	12	6	9	7	5	5	8	7	7	7	8	9	12	9	11	8	5	8	8	9	9	9	8	8	9	7	7	7	6	6	7	7	8

Source: WorldFootball.net
A = Away; H = Home; W = Win; D = Draw; L = Loss

Note

In order to preserve chronological evolvements, any postponed matches are not included to the round at which they were originally scheduled, but added to the full round they were played immediately afterwards.

==== Matches ====
16 August 2024 1	Brescia	1–0	Palermo	Brescia
20:30 CEST (UTC+2)	Dickmann (yellow card) 12'; Adorni 90'	Report	Di Francesco (yellow card) 45+3'	Stadium: Mario Rigamonti; Attendance: 7,706; Referee: Gianluca Aureliano

24 August 2024 2	Pisa	2–0	Palermo	Pisa
20:30 CEST (UTC+2)	Nedelcearu 4' (o.g.); Beruatto (yellow card) 51'; Touré (yellow card) 53'; Bonfanti 66'	Report	Pierozzi (yellow card) 4'; Peda (yellow card) 86'	Stadium: Arena Garibaldi; Attendance: 8,811; Referee: Andrea Colombo

27 August 2024 3	Cremonese	0–1	Palermo	Cremona
20:30 CEST (UTC+2)	Vandeputte (yellow card) 13'; Barbieri (yellow card) 90+4'; Lochoshvili (red card) 90+6'; Bianchetti (yellow card) 90+6'	Report	Blin (yellow card) 22'; Di Francesco (yellow card) 47'; Insigne 76'; Ceccaroni (yellow card) 80'	Stadium: Giovanni Zini; Attendance: 9,837; Referee: Francesco Fourneau

1 September 2024 4	Palermo	1–1	Cosenza	Palermo
20:30 CEST (UTC+2)	Diakité (yellow card) 55'; Di Mariano 80'	Report	Florenzi (yellow card) 21'; Hristov (yellow card) 31'; Fumagalli 40'; Kourfalidis (yellow card) 569'; Mauri (yellow card) 79'	Stadium: Renzo Barbera; Attendance: 25,787; Referee: Luca Massimi

14 September 2024 5	Juve Stabia	1–3	Palermo	Castellammare di Stabia
15:00 CEST (UTC+2)	Leone (yellow card) 45+1'; Adorante 61'; Floriani Mussolini (yellow card) 67'	Report	Segre 18'; Henry 43'; Insigne (yellow card) 55'; Pierozzi (yellow card) 66'; Brunori 79' (pen.)	Stadium: Romeo Menti; Attendance: 6,493; Referee: Simone Sozza

21 September 2024 6	Palermo	0–0	Cesena	Palermo
15:00 CEST (UTC+2)	Diakité (yellow card) 45+1'; Segre (yellow card) 53'; Pierozzi (yellow card) 56'; Šarić (yellow card) 70'	Report	Donnarumma (yellow card) 29'; Curto (yellow card) 40'; Calò (yellow card) 69'; Ciofi (yellow card) 79'; Prestia (yellow card) 89'	Stadium: Renzo Barbera; Attendance: 23,230; Referee: Gianluca Manganiello

30 September 2024 7	Südtirol	1–3	Palermo	Bolzano
19:30 CEST (UTC+2)	Ceppitelli (yellow card) 20'; Casiraghi 51'; Rover (yellow card) 63'; Kofler (yellow card) 73'; El Kaouakibi (yellow card) 86'	Report	Baniya 20'; Di Mariano (yellow card) 55'; Diakité 63'; Desplanches (yellow card) 71'; Insigne 81'	Stadium: Druso; Attendance: 4,076; Referee: Simone Galipò

6 October 2024 8	Palermo	0–1	Salernitana	Palermo
15:00 CEST (UTC+2)	Segre (yellow card) 34'; Henry (yellow card) 88'	Report	Soriano (yellow card) 19'; Tello 21'; Amatucci (yellow card) 69'; Braaf (yellow card) 79'; Stojanović (yellow card) 82'; Hrustić (yellow card) 90+2'	Stadium: Renzo Barbera; Attendance: 25,460; Referee: Federico Dionisi

19 October 2024 9	Modena	2–2	Palermo	Modena
15:00 CEST (UTC+2)	Santoro (yellow card) 25'; Di Pardo (yellow card) 38'; Gliozzi 48'; Caldara 85'; Zaro (yellow card) 90+2'	Report	Verre 34'; Henry (penalty missed) 35'; Insigne 45+1' (yellow card) 71'; Lund (yellow card) 89'	Stadium: Alberto Braglia; Attendance: 10,123; Referee: Antonio Rapuano

26 October 2024 10	Palermo	2–0	Reggiana	Palermo
15:00 CEST (UTC+2)	Gomes 15' (yellow card) 75'; Henry 26'	Report	Ignacchiti (yellow card) 48'; Marras (yellow card) 50'	Stadium: Renzo Barbera; Attendance: 19,427; Referee: Luca Massimi

30 October 2024 11	Mantova	0–0	Palermo	Mantua
20:30 CET (UTC+1)	Artioli (yellow card) 90+2'	Report	Ceccaroni (yellow card) 34'; Diakité (yellow card) 73'; Le Douaron (yellow card) 90+5'	Stadium: Danilo Martelli; Attendance: 8,852; Referee: Livio Martinelli

3 November 2024 12	Palermo	0–1	Cittadella	Palermo
15:00 CET (UTC+1)	Verre (yellow card) 60'; Gomes (yellow card) 75'	Report	Rabbi (yellow card) 9'; Salvi (yellow card) 84'; Pandolfi 90' (yellow card) 90+1'; Vita (yellow card) 90+3'	Stadium: Renzo Barbera; Attendance: 20,591; Referee: Francesco Fourneau

8 November 2024 13	Frosinone	1–1	Palermo	Frosinone
20:30 CET (UTC+1)	Bracaglia 16'; Darboe (yellow card) 28'; Biraschi (yellow card) 73'; Garritano (yellow card) 89'	Report	Insigne 2'; Verre (yellow card) 45'	Stadium: Benito Stirpe; Attendance: 10,683; Referee: Matteo Marchetti

24 November 2024 14	Palermo	1–1	Sampdoria	Palermo
17:15 CET (UTC+1)	Di Francesco 45+3'	Report	Tutino 38'; Venuti (yellow card) 79'; Ferrari (yellow card) 90+2'	Stadium: Renzo Barbera; Attendance: 21,425; Referee: Daniele Doveri

1 December 2024 15	Palermo	2–0	Spezia	Palermo
15:00 CET (UTC+1)	Henry (yellow card) 13'; Ceccaroni (yellow card) 26'; Baniya 35'; Ranocchia (yellow card) 41'; Di Francesco (yellow card) 52'; Wiśniewski 64' (o.g.)	Report	Cassata (yellow card) 16'; Hristov (yellow card) 45+2'; Matějů (yellow card) 52'	Stadium: Renzo Barbera; Attendance: 18,032; Referee: Alessandro Prontera

7 December 2024 16	Carrarese	1–0	Palermo	Carrara
15:00 CET (UTC+1)	Guarino (yellow card) 73'; Shpendi 77' (yellow card) 79'; Cicconi (yellow card) 90+3'	Report	Ceccaroni (yellow card) 70'	Stadium: Dei Marmi; Attendance: 3,646; Referee: Valerio Crezzini

15 December 2024 17	Palermo	1–2	Catanzaro	Palermo
15:00 CET (UTC+1)	Nikolaou 32'; Ranocchia (yellow card) 42'; Segre (yellow card) 86'; Verre (yellow card) 90+6'	Report	Biasci 3'; Ceresoli (yellow card) 45+3'; Pompetti 82'	Stadium: Renzo Barbera; Attendance: 18,304; Referee: Alberto Ruben Arena

21 December 2024 18	Sassuolo	2–1	Palermo	Reggio Emilia
15:00 CET (UTC+1)	Laurienté 9'; Pierini 70'	Report	Le Douaron 21'; Baniya (yellow card) 82'; Nikolaou (yellow card) 84'	Stadium: Mapei Stadium – Città del Tricolore; Attendance: 4,744; Referee: Giovanni Ayroldi

26 December 2024 19	Palermo	1–0	Bari	Palermo
18:00 CET (UTC+1)	Le Douaron 41'; Brunori (yellow card) 45+1'; Segre (yellow card) 61'; Nedelcearu (yellow card) 90'	Report	Maita (yellow card) 65'; Pucino (yellow card) 84'	Stadium: Renzo Barbera; Attendance: 19,264; Referee: Simone Sozza

29 December 2024 20	Cittadella	2–1	Palermo	Cittadella
17:15 CET (UTC+1)	Casolari (yellow card) 27'; Salvi (yellow card) 32'; Vita 44'; D'Alessio (yellow card) 53'; Masciangelo 90+1' (yellow card) 90+3'	Report	Nikolaou (yellow card) 11'; Lund 55'; Henry (yellow card) 87'; Buttaro (yellow card) 90+4'	Stadium: Piercesare Tombolato; Attendance: 4,766; Referee: Simone Galipò

12 January 2025 21	Palermo	2–0	Modena	Palermo
15:00 CET (UTC+1)	Gomes (yellow card) 25'; Brunori 38'; Le Douaron 56'; Nikolaou (yellow card) 81'	Report	Dellavalle (yellow card) 63'; Santoro (yellow card) 88'	Stadium: Renzo Barbera; Attendance: 16,645; Referee: Kevin Bonacina

19 January 2025 22	Palermo	1–0	Juve Stabia	Palermo
15:00 CET (UTC+1)	Lund (yellow card) 38'; Le Douaron 57'; Gomes (yellow card) 76'	Report	Piscopo (yellow card) 21'; Pierobon (yellow card) 33'; Candellone (yellow card) 57'	Stadium: Renzo Barbera; Attendance: 17,606; Referee: Luca Massimi

26 January 2025 23	Reggiana	2–1	Palermo	Reggio Emilia
15:00 CET (UTC+1)	Lucchesi 14'; Sersanti 47'; Kabashi (yellow card) 58'; Marras (yellow card) 76'; Vergara (yellow card) 83'	Report	Ceccaroni 25'; Brunori (yellow card) 45+2'; Baniya (yellow card) 54'; Verre (yellow card) 81'; Diakité (yellow card) 90'; Nikolaou (yellow card) 90+5'	Stadium: Mapei Stadium – Città del Tricolore; Attendance: 10,200; Referee: Matteo Marchetti

31 January 2025 24	Palermo	1–2	Pisa	Palermo
20:30 CET (UTC+1)	Brunori 59' (yellow card) 61'	Report	Rus 13' (pen.); Caracciolo (yellow card) 23'; Lind 26'; Meister (yellow card) 65'; Touré (yellow card) 72'	Stadium: Renzo Barbera; Attendance: 21,585; Referee: Kevin Bonacina

9 February 2025 25	Spezia	2–2	Palermo	La Spezia
15:00 CET (UTC+1)	Matějů (yellow card) 87'; F. Esposito 90+2'; Aurelio 90+5'	Report	Ranocchia 1'; Baniya (yellow card) 26'; Brunori (yellow card) 29' (goal) 72'; Blin (yellow card) 35'; Lund (yellow card) 42'	Stadium: Alberto Picco; Attendance: 10,448; Referee: Davide Ghersini

16 February 2025 26	Palermo	2–2	Mantova	Palermo
15:00 CET (UTC+1)	Verre 26'; Diakité (yellow card) 60'; Pohjanpalo 68' (pen.); Ceccaroni (red card) 69'	Report	Mensah 46'; Brignani 57'; De Maio (yellow card) 67'; Burrai (yellow card) 67'; Trimboli (yellow card) 79'; Bani (yellow card) 90+5'	Stadium: Renzo Barbera; Attendance: 18,728; Referee: Simone Galipò

23 February 2025 27	Cosenza	0–3	Palermo	Cosenza
15:00 CET (UTC+1)	Charlys (yellow card) 42'; Caporale (yellow card) 68'	Report	Pierozzi 30' (yellow card) 44'; Brunori 56' (pen.) (yellow card) 79'; Pohjanpalo 65'	Stadium: San Vito-Gigi Marulla; Attendance: 4,362; Referee: Federico Dionisi

2 March 2025 28	Palermo	1–0	Brescia	Palermo
15:00 CET (UTC+1)	Blin (yellow card) 28'; Ceccaroni (yellow card) 57'; Magnani (yellow card) 83'; Pohjanpalo 87' (pen.); Vasic (yellow card) 90+1'	Report	Bisoli (yellow card) 17'; Borrelli (yellow card) 64'; Papetti (yellow card) 90+3'	Stadium: Renzo Barbera; Attendance: 18,819; Referee: Mario Perri

8 March 2025 29	Sampdoria	1–1	Palermo	Genoa
17:15 CET (UTC+1)	Coda 1'; Depaoli (yellow card) 22'; Akinsanmiro (red card) 61'	Report	Pohjanpalo 40'; Pierozzi (yellow card) 75'	Stadium: Luigi Ferraris; Attendance: 25,323; Referee: Daniele Perenzoni

14 March 2025 30	Palermo	2–3	Cremonese	Palermo
20:30 CET (UTC+1)	Ceccaroni (yellow card) 6'; Brunori (yellow card) 53' (goal) 72' (pen.): Gomes 55'; Verre (yellow card) 73'; Diakité (yellow card) 78'; Vasic (yellow card) 81'	Report	Azzi (yellow card) 28' (goal) 74'; Bianchetti (yellow card) 70'; Valoti 86'; Collocolo 90+5'	Stadium: Renzo Barbera; Attendance: 23,683; Referee: Giuseppe Collu

30 March 2025 31	Salernitana	1–2	Palermo	Salerno
17:15 CEST (UTC+2)	Zuccon (yellow card) 33'; Amatucci (yellow card) 44'; Stojanović (yellow card) 85'; Amatucci 90+1'	Report	Brunori 27'; Pohjanpalo 40'; Blin (yellow card) 54'	Stadium: Arechi; Attendance: 15,562; Referee: Alberto Ruben Arena

6 April 2025 32	Palermo	5–3	Sassuolo	Palermo
15:00 CEST (UTC+2)	Pohjanpalo 18', 45+1', 81'; Toljan 25' (o.g.); Magnani (yellow card) 48'; Segre 55' (yellow card) 76'	Report	Laurienté (yellow card) 15'; Toljan (yellow card) 61'; Pierini 73'; Moro 74'; Obiang 84'	Stadium: Renzo Barbera; Attendance: 23,172; Referee: Fabio Maresca

11 April 2025 33	Bari	2–1	Palermo	Bari
20:30 CEST (UTC+2)	Maggiore 6'; Favasuli (yellow card) 52'; Šimić 89'	Report	Pohjanpalo 18'; Magnani (yellow card) 48'; Lund (yellow card) 84'	Stadium: San Nicola; Attendance: 17,179; Referee: Kevin Bonacina

27 April 2025 35	Catanzaro	1–3	Palermo	Catanzaro
15:00 CEST (UTC+2	Biasci 56'; Brighenti (yellow card) 65'; Cassandro (yellow card) 74'	Report	Bonini 9' (o.g.); Segre 26'; Pierozzi (yellow card) 60'; Le Douaron 90+3'	Stadium: Nicola Ceravolo; Attendance: 9,024; Referee: Ermanno Feliciani

1 May 2025 36	Palermo	1–2	Südtirol	Palermo
15:00 CEST (UTC+2	Ceccaroni 27'; Magnani (yellow card) 45+1'; Brunori (yellow card) 90+1'	Report	Veseli (yellow card) 12'; Barreca 47'; Gori 75' (pen.) (yellow card) 76'; Pietrangeli (yellow card) 90+5'	Stadium: Renzo Barbera; Attendance: 20,428; Referee: Alberto Santoro

4 May 2025 37	Cesena	2–1	Palermo	Cesena
15:00 CEST (UTC+2	Calò 37'; Šarić 46'; Piacentini (yellow card) 53'; Ceesay (yellow card) 80'	Report	Pierozzi (yellow card) 41' (goal) 45+6'; Diakité (yellow card) 45+2'; Pohjanpalo (penalty missed) 45+5'	Stadium: Dino Manuzzi – Orogel Stadium; Attendance: 12,074; Referee: Gianluca Aureliano

9 May 2025 38	Palermo	2–0	Frosinone	Palermo
20:30 CEST (UTC+2	Brunori 30', 48' (yellow card) 82'; Blin (yellow card) 81'	Report		Stadium: Renzo Barbera; Attendance: 20,556; Referee: Federico Dionisi

13 May 2025 34	Palermo	1–1	Carrarese	Palermo
20:30 CEST (UTC+2)	Nikolaou (yellow card) 14'; Di Mariano (yellow card) 53'; Salim Diakité (yellow card) 68'; Le Douaron 86' (yellow card) 86'	Report	Shpendi 16'; Guarino (yellow card) 21' (yellow-red card) 57'; Illanes (yellow card) 86'	Stadium: Renzo Barbera; Attendance: 21,125; Referee: Mario Perri
Note: All matches of round 34 were postponed following the death of Pope Francis.

=== Promotion play-offs ===
==== Preliminary round ====
17 May 2025 Preliminary round	Juve Stabia	1–0	Palermo	Castellammare di Stabia
19:30 CEST (UTC+2)	Ruggero (yellow card) 55'; Adorante 67' (yellow card) 68'	Report	Gomes (yellow card) 87'	Stadium: Romeo Menti; Attendance: 7,114; Referee: Marco Di Bello

=== Coppa Italia ===
11 August 2024 First round	Parma	0–1	Palermo	Parma
18:30 CEST (UTC+2)	Man (penalty missed) 19'; Mihăilă (yellow card) 52'	Report	Blin (yellow card) 22'; Insigne 45+2'; Gomes (yellow card) 86'; Henry (yellow card) 88'	Stadium: Ennio Tardini; Attendance: 5,034; Referee: Daniele Perenzoni

26 September 2024 Second round	Napoli	5–0	Palermo	Naples
21:00 CEST (UTC+2)	Ngonge 7', 12'; Juan Jesus 42'; Neres 70'; McTominay 77'; Marín (yellow card) 86'	Report	Vasic (red card) 58'	Stadium: Diego Armando Maradona; Attendance: 51,000; Referee: Giuseppe Collu

=== Appearances and goals ===
No.	Pos.	Name	Serie B		Play-offs		Coppa Italia		Total	
No.	Pos.	Name		Goal		Goal		Goal		Goal
1	GK	(Italy) Sebastiano Desplanches	21	0	—		—		21	0
3	DF	(United States) Kristoffer Lund	33	1	—		2	0	35	1
4	DF	(Turkey) Rayyan Baniya	29	2	1	0	1	0	31	2
5	DF	(Italy) Fabio Lucioni	—		—		1	0	1	0
6	MF	(France) Claudio Gomes	33	2	1	0	2	0	36	2
7	FW	(Italy) Francesco Di Mariano	20	1	1	0	1	0	22	1
8	MF	(Italy) Jacopo Segre	34	3	1	0	1	0	36	3
9	FW	(Italy) Matteo Brunori	33	9	1	0	2	0	36	9
10	MF	(Italy) Filippo Ranocchia	35	1	1	0	2	0	38	1
11	FW	(Italy) Roberto Insigne	25	4	—		2	1	27	5
12	GK	(Indonesia) Emil Audero	14	0	1	0	—		15	0
12	GK	(Italy) Manfredi Nespola	—		—		—		0	0
14	MF	(Serbia) Aljosa Vasic	24	0	1	0	2	0	27	0
16	GK	(Senegal) Alfred Gomis	1	0	—		1	0	2	0
17	FW	(Italy) Federico Di Francesco	28	1	1	0	1	0	30	1
18	DF	(Romania) Ionuț Nedelcearu	9	0	—		1	0	10	0
19	FW	(France) Stredair Appuah	4	0	—		—		4	0
19	FW	(Finland) Joel Pohjanpalo	14	9	1	0	—		15	9
20	FW	(France) Thomas Henry	24	2	—		1	0	25	2
21	FW	(France) Jérémy Le Douaron	33	6	1	0	1	0	35	6
23	DF	(France) Salim Diakité	31	1	1	0	1	0	33	1
24	DF	(Italy) Giangiacomo Magnani	13	0	—		—		13	0
25	DF	(Italy) Alessio Buttaro	4	0	—		1	0	5	0
26	MF	(Italy) Valerio Verre	28	2	—		—		28	2
27	DF	(Italy) Niccolò Pierozzi	25	2	1	0	1	0	27	2
28	MF	(France) Alexis Blin	17	0	1	0	1	0	19	0
29	DF	(Poland) Patryk Peda	1	0	—		2	0	3	0
30	MF	(Bosnia and Herzegovina) Dario Šarić	8	0	—		2	0	10	0
32	DF	(Italy) Pietro Ceccaroni	29	2	1	0	1	0	31	2
43	DF	(Greece) Dimitrios Nikolaou	29	1	—		1	0	30	1
46	GK	(Italy) Salvatore Sirigu	3	0	—		1	0	4	0
63	GK	(Italy) Francesco Cutrona	—		—		—		0	0
77	GK	(Italy) Francesco Di Bartolo	—		—		—		0	0
Own goals			—	3	—	0	—	0	—	3
Totals			—	52	—	0	—	1	—	53

=== Disciplinary record ===
No.	Pos.	Name	Serie B		Play-offs		Coppa Italia		Total	
No.	Pos.	Name	Yellow card	Red card	Yellow card	Red card	Yellow card	Red card	Yellow card	Red card
1	GK	(Italy) Sebastiano Desplanches	1	0	—		—		1	0
3	DF	(United States) Kristoffer Lund	4	0	—		—		4	0
4	DF	(Turkey) Rayyan Baniya	4	0	—		—		4	0
6	MF	(France) Claudio Gomes	4	0	1	0	1	0	6	0
7	FW	(Italy) Francesco Di Mariano	2	0	—		—		2	0
8	MF	(Italy) Jacopo Segre	5	0	—		—		5	0
9	FW	(Italy) Matteo Brunori	8	0	—		—		8	0
10	MF	(Italy) Filippo Ranocchia	2	0	—		—		2	0
11	FW	(Italy) Roberto Insigne	2	0	—		—		2	0
14	MF	(Serbia) Aljosa Vasic	2	0	—		0	1	2	1
17	FW	(Italy) Federico Di Francesco	3	0	—		—		3	0
18	DF	(Romania) Ionuț Nedelcearu	1	0	—		—		1	0
20	FW	(France) Thomas Henry	3	0	—		1	0	4	0
21	FW	(France) Jérémy Le Douaron	2	0	—		—		2	0
23	DF	(France) Salim Diakité	7	0	—		—		7	0
24	DF	(Italy) Giangiacomo Magnani	4	0	—		—		4	0
25	DF	(Italy) Alessio Buttaro	1	0	—		—		1	0
26	MF	(Italy) Valerio Verre	5	0	—		—		5	0
27	DF	(Italy) Niccolò Pierozzi	7	0	—		—		7	0
28	MF	(France) Alexis Blin	5	0	—		1	0	6	0
29	DF	(Poland) Patryk Peda	1	0	—		—		1	0
30	MF	(Bosnia and Herzegovina) Dario Šarić	1	0	—		—		1	0
32	DF	(Italy) Pietro Ceccaroni	6	1	—		—		6	1
43	DF	(Greece) Dimitrios Nikolaou	5	0	—		—		5	0
Totals			85	1	1	0	3	1	89	2

=== Goals conceded and clean sheets ===
No.	Pos.	Name	Serie B		Play-offs		Coppa Italia		Total	
No.	Pos.	Name	Goal		Goal		Goal		Goal	
1	GK	(Italy) Sebastiano Desplanches	21	6	—		—		21	6
12	GK	(Indonesia) Emil Audero	20	3	1	0	—		21	3
16	GK	(Senegal) Alfred Gomis	0	1	—		0	1	0	2
46	GK	(Italy) Salvatore Sirigu	2	2	—		5	0	7	2
Totals			43	12	1	0	5	1	49	13

=== Attendances ===
	Matches	Attendances	Average	Highest	Lowest
Serie B	19	393,867	20,730	25,787	16,645
Play-offs	—				
Coppa Italia	—				
