= Salim Diakité =

Malian footballer (born 2000)

Personal information
- Date of birth: 3 June 2000 (age 26)
- Place of birth: Les Mureaux, France
- Height: 1.87 m (6 ft 2 in)
- Position: Defender

Team information
- Current team: Zulte Waregem (on loan from Palermo)
- Number: 23

Youth career
- Les Mureaux
- Mantois
- Rio Ave

Senior career*
| Years | Team | Apps | (Gls) |
| 2018–2019 | Mantois | 1 | (0) |
| 2019–2020 | Olympia Agnonese | 24 | (1) |
| 2020–2021 | Teramo | 26 | (0) |
| 2021–2024 | Ternana | 70 | (4) |
| 2024– | Palermo | 60 | (3) |
| 2026 | → Juve Stabia (loan) | 12 | (0) |
| 2026– | → Zulte Waregem (loan) | 0 | (0) |

International career^{‡}
| 2024– | Mali | 8 | (0) |
- * Club domestic league appearances and goals as of 10 May 2026 ‡ National team caps and goals as of 8 September 2025

Salim Diakité (born 3 June 2000) is a professional footballer who plays as a defender for Belgian Pro League club Zulte Waregem, on loan from Serie B club Palermo. Born in France, he plays for the Mali national team.

== Club career ==
=== Eraly career ===
In 2018, Diakité joined the youth academy of Portuguese top flight side Rio Ave.

=== Olympia Agnonese ===
In 2019, he signed for Olympia Agnonese in the Italian fourth division from French fourth division club Mantois.

=== Teramo ===
In 2020, he signed for Teramo in the Italian third division.

=== Ternana ===
In 2021, he joined Serie B side Ternana.

=== Palermo ===
On 25 January 2024, Diakité signed a 4.5-year contract with Palermo. On 10 May 2024, he made his debut goal for Palermo against Südtirol. On 2 February 2026, Diakité was loaned by Juve Stabia.

On 17 August 2026, Diakité moved on a new loan to Zulte Waregem in the Belgian top tier, with an option to buy.

== International career ==
Born in France, Diakité is of Malian descent. He made his debut for the Mali national team on 11 June 2024 in a World Cup qualifier against Madagascar at the FNB Stadium in Johannesburg, South Africa. He started the game and played 88 minutes in a scoreless draw.

== Career statistics ==
=== Club ===
As of match played 30 August 2025

Appearances and goals by club, season and competition
| Club | Season | League | | | National Cup | | Other | | Total | |
| Club | Season | Division | Apps | Goals | Apps | Goals | Apps | Goals | Apps | Goals |
|---|---|---|---|---|---|---|---|---|---|---|
| Mantois | 2018–19 | Championnat National 2 | 1 | 0 | — | | — | | 1 | 0 |
| Olympia Agnonese | 2019–20 | Serie D | 24 | 0 | 1 | 0 | — | | 25 | 0 |
| Teramo | 2020–21 | Serie C | 26 | 0 | 2 | 0 | — | | 28 | 0 |
| Ternana | 2021–22 | Serie B | 19 | 0 | 1 | 0 | 1 (Note: Appearances in Campionato Primavera 2) | 0 | 21 | 0 |
| Ternana | 2022–23 | Serie B | 32 | 0 | 0 | 0 | — | | 32 | 0 |
| Ternana | 2023–24 | Serie B | 19 | 3 | 1 | 0 | — | | 20 | 3 |
| Ternana | Total | | 70 | 3 | 2 | 0 | 1 | 0 | 73 | 3 |
| Palermo | 2023–24 | Serie B | 15 | 1 | 1 | 0 | 3 (Note: Appearances in Serie B Play-off) | 2 | 19 | 3 |
| Palermo | 2024–25 | Serie B | 32 | 1 | 1 | 0 | — | | 33 | 1 |
| Palermo | 2025–26 | Serie B | 2 | 0 | 1 | 0 | — | | 3 | 0 |
| Palermo | Total | | 49 | 2 | 3 | 0 | 3 | 2 | 55 | 4 |
| Career total | | | 170 | 5 | 8 | 0 | 4 | 0 | 182 | 7 |

=== International ===
As of match played 8 September 2025

Appearances and goals by national team and year
| National team | Year | Apps | Goals |
|---|---|---|---|
| Mali | 2024 | 5 | 0 |
| Mali | 2025 | 3 | 0 |
| Total | | 8 | 0 |
