= Jérémy Le Douaron =

French footballer (born 1998)

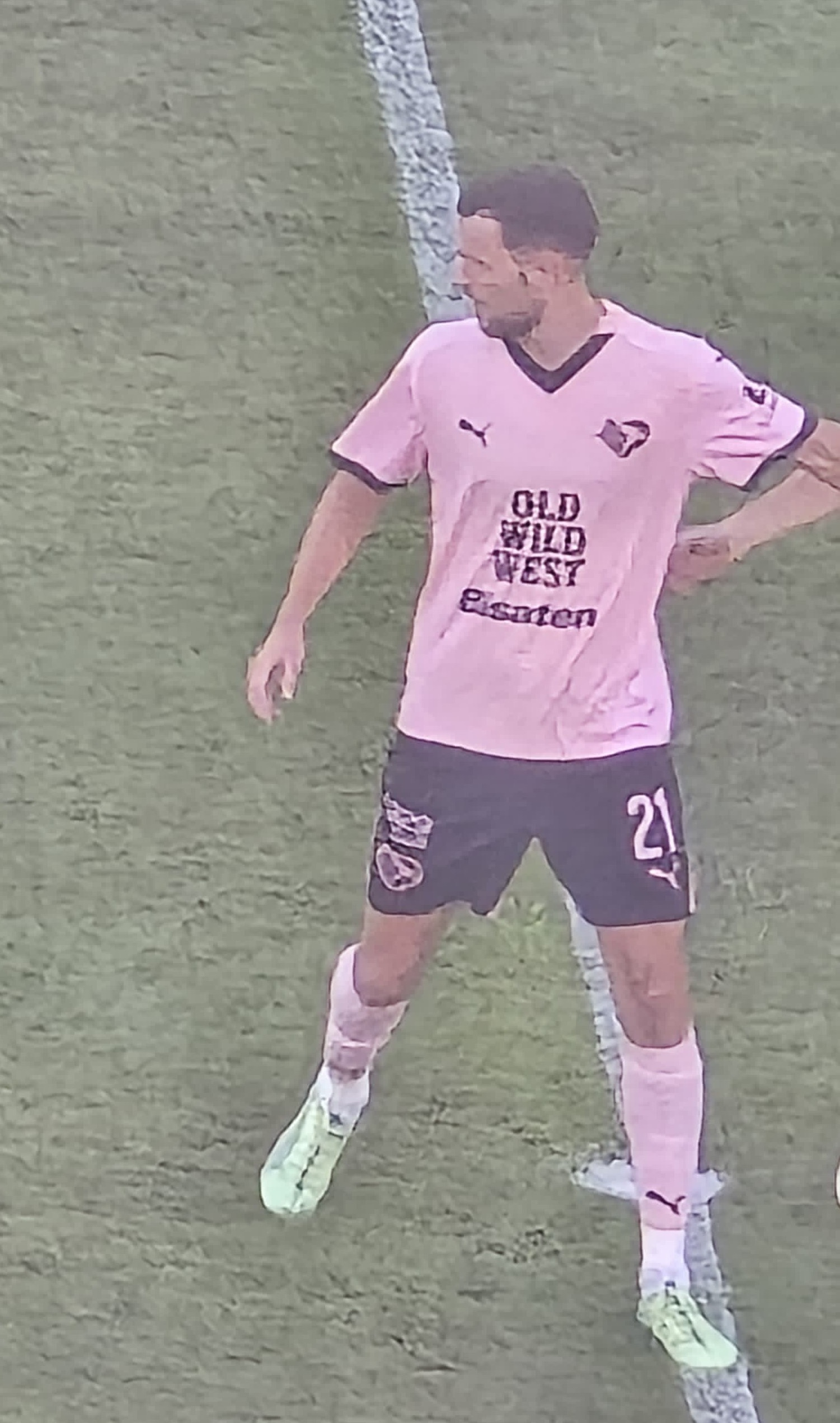
- Le Douaron playing for Palermo in 2024

Personal information
- Date of birth: 21 April 1998 (age 28)
- Place of birth: Ploufragan, France
- Height: 1.89 m (6 ft 2 in)
- Position: Forward

Team information
- Current team: Troyes (on loan from Palermo)
- Number: 9

Youth career
- 2011–2012: CO Briochin
- 2012–2016: Guingamp
- 2016–2018: Stade Briochin

Senior career*
Years	Team	Apps	(Gls)
2018–2020	Stade Briochin	46	(16)
2020–2024	Brest	127	(20)
2024–	Palermo	71	(11)
2026–	→ Troyes (loan)	1	(1)
- * Club domestic league appearances and goals as of 6 September 2026

Jérémy Le Douaron (born 21 April 1998) is a French professional footballer who plays as a forward for Ligue 1 club Troyes on loan from Italian club Palermo.

== Career ==
Le Douaron made his professional debut with Brest in a 4–0 Ligue 1 loss to Nîmes on 23 August 2020. On 27 October 2022, he signed a new contract with Brest until June 2026. In November 2023, he extended his contract for another year until 2027. In the 2023–24 season, he contributed to his club's impressive campaign, as they secured a third-place finish in the league and first ever qualification to the UEFA Champions League.

On 30 August 2024, Le Douaron signed for Serie B club Palermo.

On 31 August 2026, Le Douaron was loaned by Troyes in Ligue 1.

== Career statistics ==
As of match played 21 February 2026

Appearances and goals by club, season and competition
Club	Season	League			National cup (Note: Includes Coupe de France, Coppa Italia)		Europe		Other		Total	
Club	Season	Division	Apps	Goals	Apps	Goals	Apps	Goals	Apps	Goals	Apps	Goals
Brest	2020–21	Ligue 1	28	1	2	1	—		—		30	2
Brest	2021–22	Ligue 1	32	5	3	1	—		—		35	6
Brest	2022–23	Ligue 1	32	10	2	0	—		—		34	10
Brest	2023–24	Ligue 1	33	4	2	0	—		—		35	4
Brest	2024–25	Ligue 1	2	0	0	0	—		—		2	0
Brest	Total		127	20	9	2	—		—		136	22
Palermo	2024–25	Serie B	33	6	1	0	—		1 (Note: Appearance(s) in Serie B – Promotion play-offs)	0	35	6
Palermo	2025–26	Serie B	26	5	2	0	—		—		28	5
Palermo	Total		59	11	3	0	0	0	1	0	63	11
Career total			186	31	12	2	0	0	1	0	199	33
