= Edoardo Pierozzi =

Italian footballer (born 2001)

Personal information
- Date of birth: 12 September 2001 (age 25)
- Place of birth: Florence, Italy
- Height: 1.82 m (6 ft 0 in)
- Position: Right-back

Team information
- Current team: Benevento
- Number: 24

Youth career
- –2020: Fiorentina

Senior career*
Years	Team	Apps	(Gls)
2020–2025	Fiorentina	0	(0)
2020–2021	→ Pistoiese (loan)	33	(2)
2021–2022	→ Alessandria (loan)	19	(1)
2022–2023	→ Palermo (loan)	2	(0)
2023	→ Como (loan)	3	(0)
2023–2024	→ Cesena (loan)	27	(2)
2024	→ Taranto (loan)	0	(0)
2024–2025	→ Pescara (loan)	29	(3)
2025–	Benevento	35	(6)

International career^{‡}
2019	Italy U18	4	(0)
2019	Italy U19	4	(0)
2021	Italy U20	2	(0)
- * Club domestic league appearances and goals as of 1 May 2026 ‡ National team caps and goals as of 15 November 2021

Edoardo Pierozzi (born 12 September 2001) is an Italian professional footballer who plays as a right-back for Serie B club Benevento.

== Club career ==
He was raised in the youth system of Fiorentina.

On 31 August 2020, he joined Serie C club Pistoiese on loan for the 2020–21 season.

He made his professional Serie C debut for Pistoiese on 27 September 2020 in a game against Alessandria. He established himself as a regular starter with Pistoiese. He scored his first professional goal on 8 November 2020 in a 1–0 defeat of Pontedera.

On 19 July 2021, he moved to Alessandria.

On 29 July 2022, Pierozzi was loaned by Fiorentina to Palermo, with an option to buy. After making only two appearances with the Rosanero in the first half of the season, Pierozzi's loan was cut short, with the player moving to fellow Serie B club Como on 12 January 2023. He only made three appearances for Como before his season was cut short in April due to an injury.

On 27 July 2023, Pierozzi moved on a new loan to Cesena.

On 22 July 2024, he moved to Taranto on loan. On 8 August 2024, before the season started, he was recalled from Taranto and sent on loan to Pescara instead.

On 3 July 2025, Pierozzi joined Benevento on a three-year contract.

== International career ==
He was first called up to represent his country in February 2019 for Under-18 friendlies. Later same year, he played in the Under-19 Euro qualifiers, the final tournament was eventually cancelled due to the COVID-19 pandemic in Europe.

== Personal life ==
Pierozzi's twin brother, Niccolò, is a professional footballer as well; the two played together during their youth team years at Fiorentina.
