= Alexis Blin =

French footballer (born 1996)

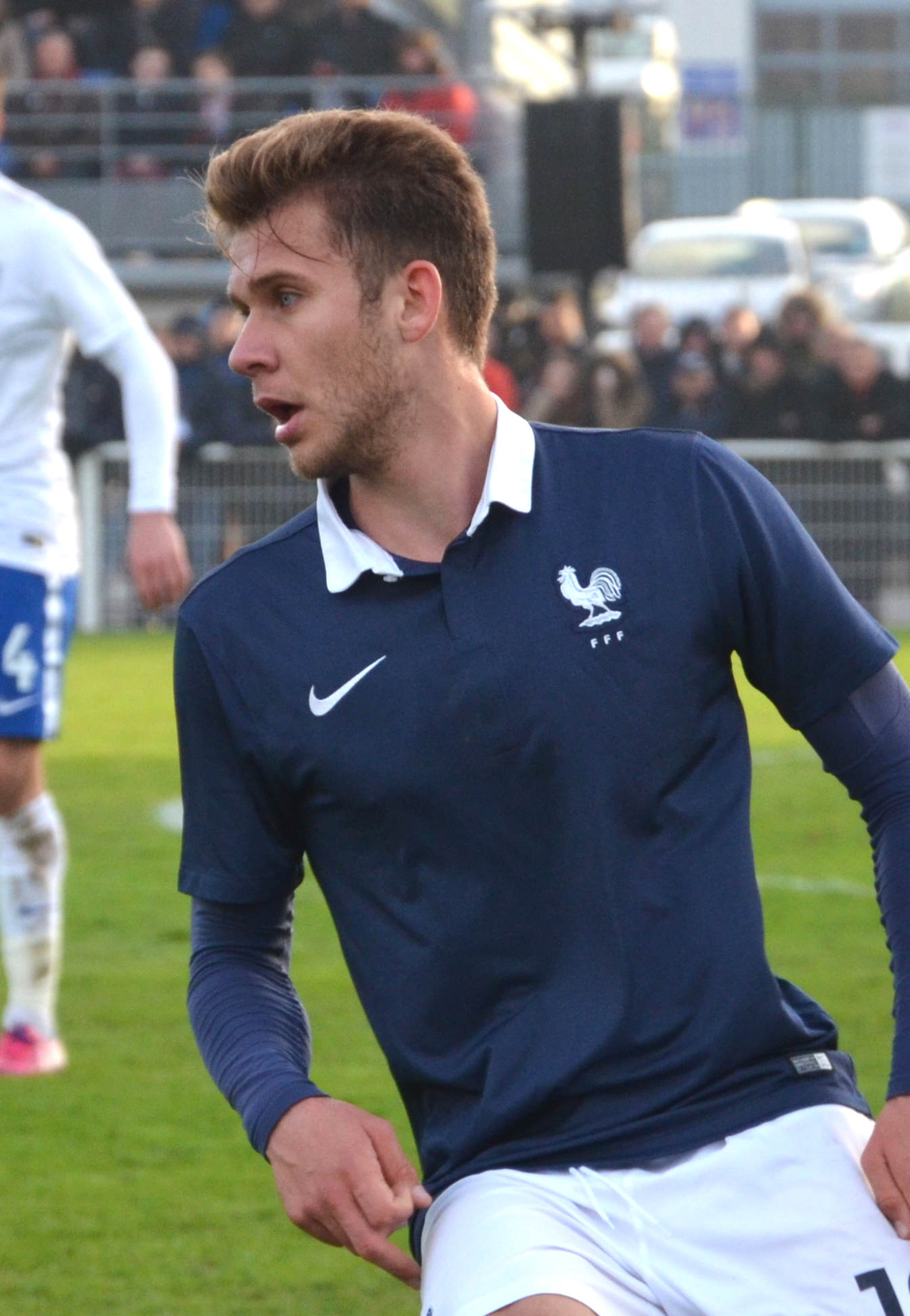
- Blin in 2015

Personal information
- Date of birth: 16 September 1996 (age 30)
- Place of birth: Le Mans, France
- Height: 1.84 m (6 ft 0 in)
- Position: Defensive midfielder

Youth career
- 2002–2007: La Bazoge
- 2007–2013: Le Mans
- 2013–2015: Toulouse

Senior career*
Years	Team	Apps	(Gls)
2013	Le Mans B	7	(0)
2013–2015	Toulouse B	25	(0)
2015–2019	Toulouse	82	(1)
2018–2019	→ Amiens (loan)	27	(1)
2019–2021	Amiens	60	(1)
2021–2024	Lecce	92	(2)
2024–2026	Palermo	38	(0)

International career
2013	France U17	4	(0)
2014–2015	France U19	15	(1)
2015–2016	France U20	3	(1)
2016	France U21	2	(0)
- * Club domestic league appearances and goals as of 30 August 2026

Alexis Blin (born 16 September 1996) is a French professional footballer who plays as a defensive midfielder.

== Club career ==
=== Toulouse ===
Blin is a youth exponent from Le Mans but transferred to Ligue 1 side Toulouse in 2013. He made his Ligue 1 debut on 25 January 2015 against Evian Thonon Gaillard in a 1–0 away defeat. He played 85 minutes, before being replaced by Youssef Benali.

==== Loan to Amiens ====
In September 2018, Blin joined league rivals Amiens on loan for the 2018–19 season with Amiens securing an option to sign him permanently.

=== Amiens ===
On 11 June 2019, Blin signed a three-year contract after previously being loaned to Amiens.

=== Lecce ===
On 23 June 2021, he signed a three-year contract with an option for a fourth year with Serie B club Lecce. He spent three seasons with the club, two of which were in Serie A. He was appointed captain of the club in his final season with the Giallorossi.

=== Palermo ===
On 25 July 2024, Serie B club Palermo announced the permanent signing of Blin from Lecce. On 1 September 2026, the contract was terminated by mutual consent.

== Career statistics ==
=== Club ===
As of match played 21 February 2026

Appearances and goals by club, season and competition
Club	Season	League			National cup		League cup		Europe		Other		Total	
Club	Season	Division	Apps	Goals	Apps	Goals	Apps	Goals	Apps	Goals	Apps	Goals	Apps	Goals
Toulouse	2014–15	Ligue 1	6	0	0	0	0	0	—		—		6	0
Toulouse	2015–16	Ligue 1	24	0	2	0	3	0	—		—		29	0
Toulouse	2016–17	Ligue 1	26	0	0	0	1	0	—		—		27	0
Toulouse	2017–18	Ligue 1	26	1	2	0	0	0	—		2	0	30	1
Toulouse	Total		82	1	4	0	4	0	0	0	2	0	92	1
Amiens (loan)	2018–19	Ligue 1	27	1	1	0	2	0	—		—		30	1
Amiens	2019–20	Ligue 1	24	0	1	0	3	1	—		—		28	1
Amiens	2020–21	Ligue 2	36	1	2	2	0	0	—		—		38	3
Amiens	Total		60	1	3	2	3	1	0	0	0	0	66	4
Lecce	2021–22	Serie B	26	1	3	0	—		—		—		29	1
Lecce	2022–23	Serie A	35	1	1	0	—		—		—		36	1
Lecce	2023–24	Serie A	31	0	1	0	—		—		—		32	0
Lecce	Total		92	2	5	0	0	0	0	0	0	0	97	2
Palermo	2024–25	Serie B	17	0	1	0	—		—		1 (Note: Appearance(s) in Serie B – Promotion play-offs)	0	19	0
Palermo	2025–26	Serie B	17	0	2	0	—		—		—		19	0
Palermo	Total		34	0	3	0	0	0	0	0	1	0	38	0
Career total			295	5	16	2	9	1	0	0	3	0	323	8
