= Niccolò Pierozzi =

Italian footballer (born 2001)

Personal information
- Date of birth: 12 September 2001 (age 25)
- Place of birth: Florence, Italy
- Height: 1.84 m (6 ft 0 in)
- Position: Right-back

Team information
- Current team: Palermo
- Number: 27

Youth career
- 2018–2021: Fiorentina

Senior career*
Years	Team	Apps	(Gls)
2021–2024	Fiorentina	0	(0)
2021–2022	→ Pro Patria (loan)	36	(8)
2022–2023	→ Reggina (loan)	34	(4)
2024	→ Salernitana (loan)	12	(1)
2024–	Palermo	61	(7)

International career^{‡}
2019	Italy U18	4	(0)
2023	Italy U21	2	(0)
- * Club domestic league appearances and goals as of 12 May 2026 ‡ National team caps and goals as of 7 October 2023

Niccolò Pierozzi (born 12 September 2001) is an Italian professional footballer who plays as a right-back for Serie B club Palermo.

== Youth career ==
Born in Florence, Pierozzi was signed by Fiorentina as a youth player. In his first season, he scored ten goals in 24 appearances on the U17 team.

== Club career ==
=== Fiorentina ===
==== Pro Patria loan ====
He was a regular starter for the Fiorentina youth teams, and in 2021 he earned a loan move to Serie C side Pro Patria to play in Serie C Group A for the 2021–22 Serie C season. Pierozzi made his debut for Pro Patria against AlbinoLeffe in a 2–1 loss. He scored his first goal for the club in a 2–1 loss a month later against Padova.

In a match against Seregno, Pierozzi received a straight red card for a professional foul. Throughout the season, Pierozzi scored eight league goals, helping Pro Patria to an eleventh-place finish.

==== Reggina loan ====
In July 2022 Pierozzi signed for Serie B club Reggina on loan for the 2022–23 Serie B season. He made his debut in a 3–1 win over SPAL He scored his first Reggina goal in a 4–0 win over Südtirol.

==== Fiorentina debut ====
Upon his return from loan, Pierozzi made his debut for the senior squad of Fiorentina on 26 October 2023 in the UEFA Conference League game against Čukarički. He did not make any league appearances, appearing on the bench in most games.

==== Salernitana loan ====
On 11 January 2024, Pierozzi moved on loan to Salernitana.

=== Palermo ===
On 25 July 2024, Palermo announced the permanent signing of Pierozzi from Fiorentina. Pierozzi made 25 league appearances, scoring 2 goals as Palermo finished 8th in Serie B.

== International career ==
Pierozzi has won four caps for the Italy U17 team, making his debut in a 3–0 friendly loss to France U17.

== Style of play ==
Pierozzi plays predominantly as a right-back but has also occasionally played as a midfielder.

== Personal life ==
Pierozzi's twin brother, Edoardo, is a professional footballer as well; the two played together during their youth team years at Fiorentina.

== Career statistics ==
As of match played 1 November 2025

Appearances and goals by club, season and competition
Club	Season	League			Coppa Italia		Europe		Other		Total	
Club	Season	Division	Apps	Goals	Apps	Goals	Apps	Goals	Apps	Goals	Apps	Goals
Pro Patria (loan)	2021–22	Serie C	36	8	2	0	–		1	0	39	8
Reggina (loan)	2022–23	Serie B	35	4	1	0	–		0	0	36	4
Fiorentina	2023–24	Serie A	0	0	0	0	2 (Note: Appearances in UEFA Conference League)	0	–		2	0
Salernitana (loan)	2023–24	Serie A	12	1	0	0	–		–		12	1
Palermo	2024–25	Serie B	25	2	1	0	–		1 (Note: Appearance in Serie B promotion play-offs)	0	27	2
Palermo	2025–26	Serie B	11	4	2	0	–		—		13	4
Palermo	Total		36	6	3	0	0	0	1	0	40	6
Career total			119	19	6	0	2	0	2	0	129	19
