= Christos Kourfalidis =

Greek footballer (born 2002)

Personal information
- Date of birth: 11 November 2002 (age 23)
- Place of birth: Thessaloniki, Greece
- Height: 1.78 m (5 ft 10 in)
- Position: Midfielder

Team information
- Current team: Athens Kallithea
- Number: 39

Youth career
- –2018: Makedonikos Litis
- 2018–2019: Cagliari

Senior career*
Years	Team	Apps	(Gls)
2019–2024	Cagliari	23	(1)
2019–2020	→ Foggia (loan)	20	(1)
2023–2024	→ Feralpisalò (loan)	29	(3)
2024–2026	Cosenza	24	(0)
2026–	Athens Kallithea	0	(0)

International career^{‡}
2022–2024	Greece U21	14	(1)
- * Club domestic league appearances and goals as of 26 April 2026 ‡ National team caps and goals as of 15 October 2024

Christos Kourfalidis (Greek: Χρήστος Κουρφαλίδης; born 11 November 2002) is a Greek professional footballer who plays as a midfielder for Super League 2 club Athens Kallithea.

== Career ==
Kourfalidis joined the youth system of Cagliari for the 2018–19 season. For the 2019–20 season, he was loaned to Foggia in Serie D. On 13 July 2021, he signed his first professional contract with Cagliari until 30 June 2023.

He made his debut for the senior squad of Cagliari on 15 December 2021 in a Coppa Italia game against Cittadella. He made his Serie A debut for Cagliari on 23 January 2022 in a game against Fiorentina, a 1–1 home draw.

On 1 September 2023, Kourfalidis joined Serie B club Feralpisalò on a season-long loan.

On 1 August 2024, Kourfalidis signed a two-season contract with Cosenza.

On 3 August 2026, Kourfalidis signed for Athens Kallithea on a free transfer.
