= Stredair Appuah =

French footballer (born 2004)

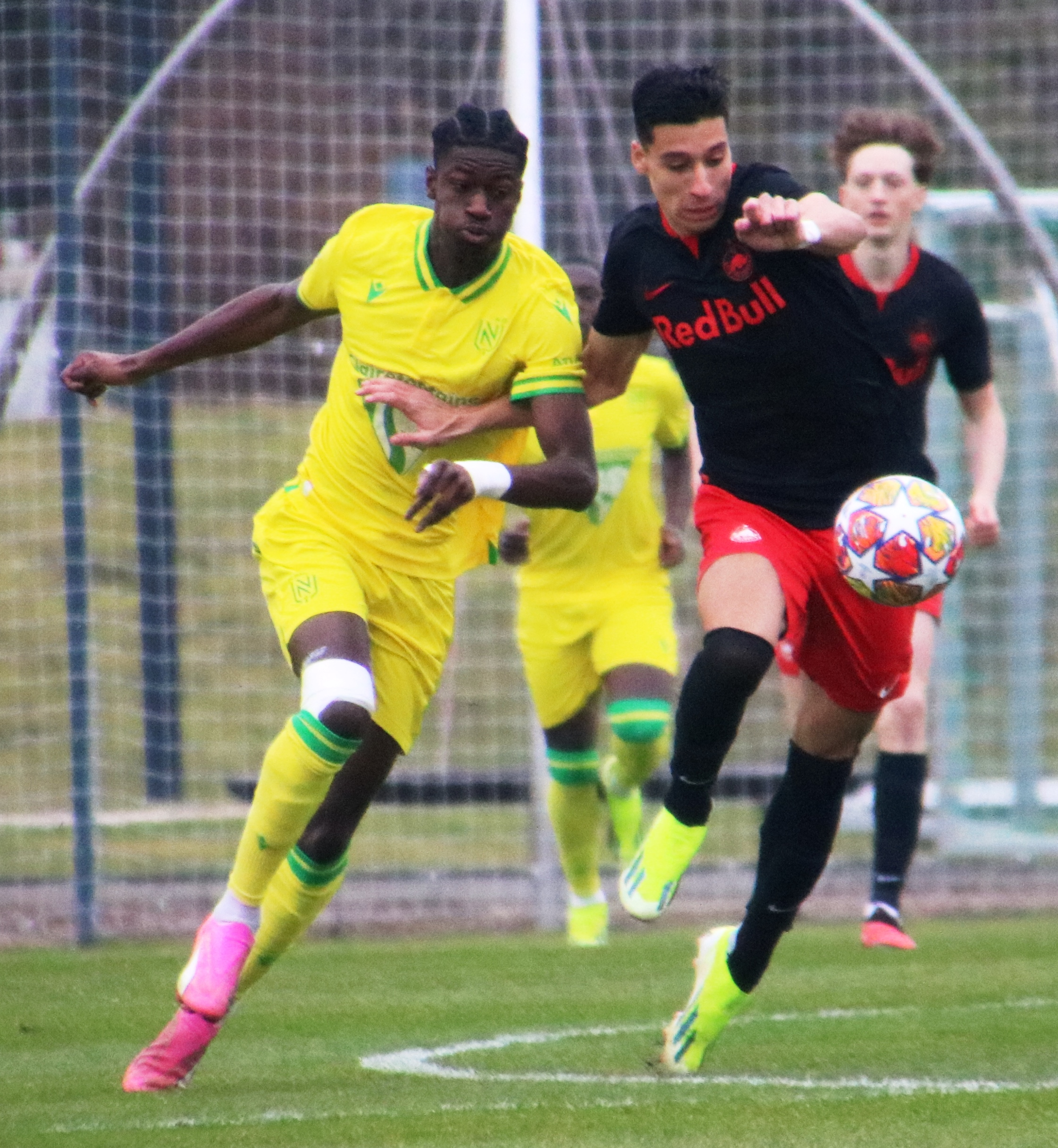
- Stredair Appuah (left) playing for FC Nantes U19 in 2024.

Personal information
- Full name: Stredair Owusu Appuah
- Date of birth: 27 June 2004 (age 22)
- Place of birth: Paris, France
- Height: 1.85 m (6 ft 1 in)
- Position: Right winger

Team information
- Current team: Lommel (on loan from Palermo)
- Number: 21

Youth career
- Paris Saint-Germain
- 2021–2022: Nantes

Senior career*
Years	Team	Apps	(Gls)
2022–2024	Nantes II	15	(1)
2023–2024	Nantes	8	(0)
2024–	Palermo	4	(0)
2025–2026	→ Valenciennes (loan)	41	(7)
2026–	→ Lommel (loan)	2	(0)

International career^{‡}
2024	France U20	2	(0)
- * Club domestic league appearances and goals as of 16 August 2026 ‡ National team caps and goals as of 25 March 2024

Stredair Owusu Appuah (born 27 June 2004) is a French professional footballer who plays as a right winger for Belgian Pro League club Lommel, on loan from Serie B club Palermo.

== Career ==
A youth product of Paris Saint-Germain, Appuah transferred to FC Nantes on 20 May 2021, signing a three-year contract. He began his senior career with the reserves of Nantes in 2022, before being promoted to their senior side in March 2023. He made his professional debut with Nantes as a late substitute in a 2–2 Ligue 1 tie with OGC Nice on 12 March 2023, assisting his side's second goal.

On 7 August 2024, Serie B club Palermo announced the signing of Appuah on a five-year contract. On 31 January 2025, Appuah was loaned by Valenciennes in the Championnat National. On 29 July 2026, he moved on a new loan to Lommel in Belgium.

== Personal life ==
Born in Paris, France, Appuah is of Ghanaian descent. He holds both French and British nationalities.
