= Rayyan Baniya =

Turkish footballer (born 1999)

Personal information
- Date of birth: 18 February 1999 (age 27)
- Place of birth: Bologna, Italy
- Height: 1.94 m (6 ft 4 in)
- Position: Defender

Team information
- Current team: Konyaspor
- Number: 22

Youth career
- –2016: Modena
- 2016–2018: Verona

Senior career*
Years	Team	Apps	(Gls)
2018–2021	Verona	0	(0)
2018–2019	→ Mantova (loan)	29	(1)
2019–2020	→ Renate (loan)	22	(1)
2020–2021	→ Mantova (loan)	8	(1)
2021–2023	Fatih Karagümrük	24	(2)
2023–2026	Trabzonspor	28	(0)
2024–2025	→ Palermo (loan)	29	(2)
2026–	Konyaspor	10	(0)
- * Club domestic league appearances and goals as of 17 October 2026

Rayyan Baniya (born 18 February 1999) is a professional footballer who plays as a defender for Süper Lig club Konyaspor. Born in Italy, he chose to represent Turkey at international level.

== Club career ==
=== Verona ===
He joined the Under-19 squad of Verona before the 2016–17 season. He did not receive any call-ups to the senior squad in 2016–17 and 2017–18 seasons. He spent the 2018–19 season on loan at Serie D side Mantova. On 29 June 2019 he signed his first professional contract with Verona for a three-year term.

==== Loan to Renate ====
On 17 July 2019 he joined Serie C club Renate on loan.

He made his professional Serie C debut for Renate on 25 August 2019 in a game against Giana Erminio. He started the game and played the whole match.

==== Second loan to Mantova ====
On 1 September 2020, he returned to Mantova, this time in Serie C.

=== Fatih Karagümrük ===
On 22 June 2021, he signed with Fatih Karagümrük in Turkey.

=== Trabzonspor ===
On 18 August 2023, he signed a 4+1 year contract with Süper Lig club Trabzonspor.

On 26 August 2024, Baniya moved to Palermo in Serie B on loan, with an option to buy.

== International career ==
In October 2023, Baniya received his first call-up to the Turkey senior national team for two UEFA Euro 2024 qualifying matches against Croatia and Latvia.

== Personal life ==
Born in Bologna, Italy to a Beninese father and a Turkish mother, Baniya holds Italian and Turkish passports.
