= Francesco D'Alessio =

Italian footballer

Personal information
- Date of birth: 21 February 2004 (age 22)
- Place of birth: Rome, Italy
- Height: 1.80 m (5 ft 11 in)
- Position: Midfielder

Team information
- Current team: Cittadella
- Number: 19

Youth career
- 2013–2024: Roma

Senior career*
Years	Team	Apps	(Gls)
2023–2024	Roma	5	(0)
2024–	Cittadella	53	(0)
- * Club domestic league appearances and goals as of 29 April 2026

Francesco D'Alessio (born 21 February 2004) is an Italian professional footballer who plays as a midfielder for Serie B club Cittadella.

== Career ==
A youth product of Roma since 2013, D'Alessio worked his way up their youth categories. He signed his first professional contract with the club on 13 July 2021 for 3 years. He helped the U19s win the Coppa Italia Primavera and Supercoppa Primavera for the 2022–23 season. He made his senior and professional debut with Roma as a substitute in a 4–0 UEFA Europa League win over Servette on 5 October 2023.

On 19 June 2024, D'Alessio joined Serie B club Cittadella on a permanent deal.

== Personal life ==
D'Alessio's twin brother, Leonardo, is also a professional footballer.
