= Alessandro Dellavalle =

Italian footballer (born 2004)

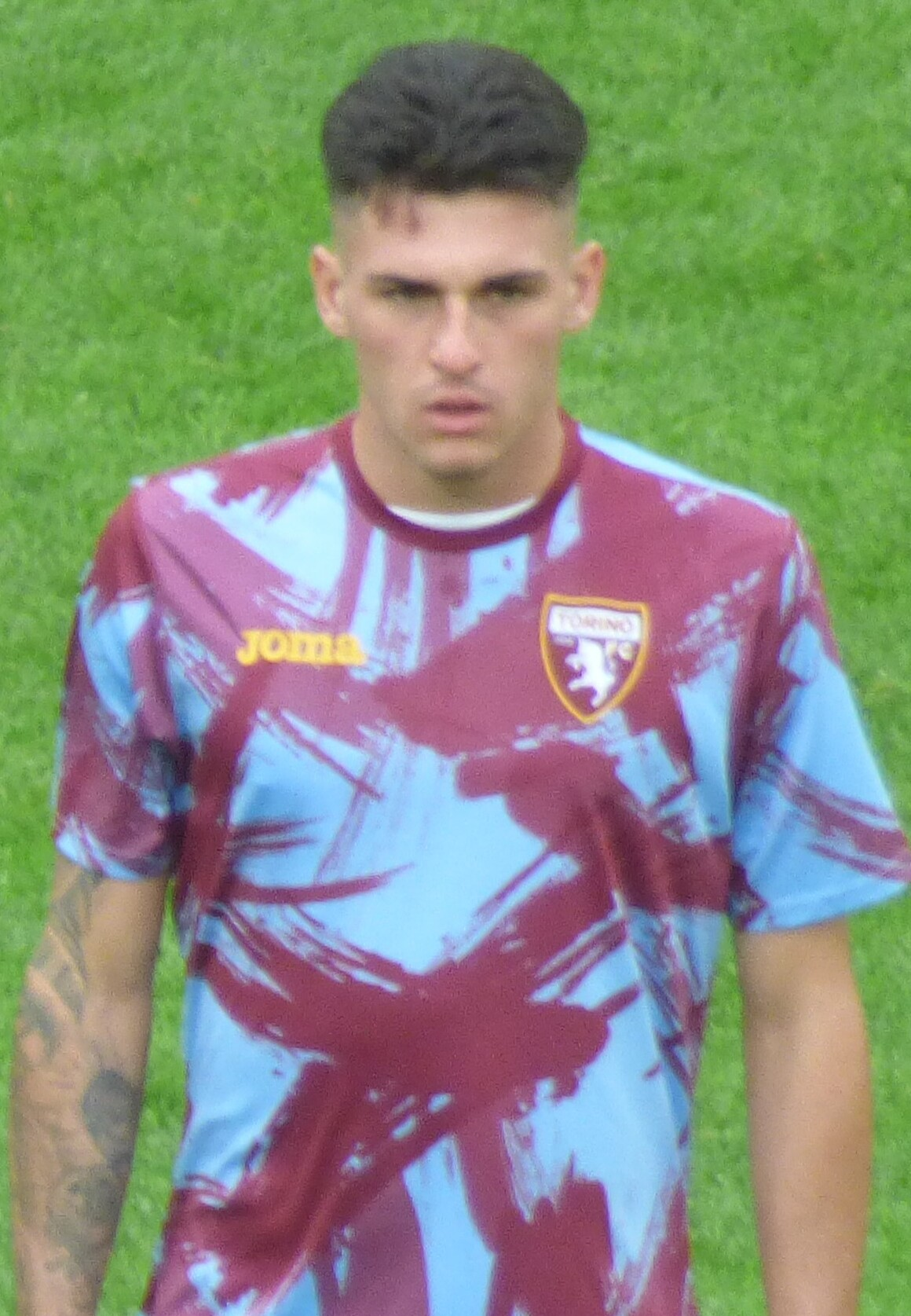
- Dellavalle in 2023

Personal information
- Date of birth: 11 May 2004 (age 22)
- Place of birth: Turin, Italy
- Height: 1.89 m (6 ft 2 in)
- Position: Centre-back

Team information
- Current team: Padova (on loan from Torino)
- Number: 27

Youth career
- 2011–2016: Juventus
- 2016–2018: Chisola Calcio
- 2018–2024: Torino

Senior career*
Years	Team	Apps	(Gls)
2024–	Torino	1	(0)
2024–2026	→ Modena (loan)	40	(1)
2026–	→ Padova (loan)	1	(0)

International career^{‡}
2023	Italy U19	3	(0)
2024	Italy U20	4	(0)
Medal record
Men's football
Representing Italy
UEFA European Under-19 Championship
Winner	2023 Malta
- * Club domestic league appearances and goals as of 23 August 2026 ‡ National team caps and goals as of 12:44, 21 August 2024 (UTC)

Alessandro Dellavalle (born 5 January 2004) is an Italian professional footballer who plays as a centre-back for Serie B club Padova, on loan from Torino.

== Club career ==
Dellavalle is a youth product of Juventus and Chisola Calcio, before moving to the youth academy of Torino in 2018. He finished his development at Torino, where he captained the U19 squad. On 13 July 2023, he signed his first professional contract with Torino until 2027. He made his senior and professional debut with Torino in a 2–1 Serie A win over Hellas Verona on 12 May 2024.

On 30 August 2024, Dellavalle was loaned by Serie B club Modena.

== International career ==
Dellavalle is a youth international for Italy. He played for the Italy U19s that won the 2023 UEFA European Under-19 Championship.

== Personal life ==
Alessandro is the cousin of Italian footballer Lorenzo Dellavalle.

== Honours ==
Italy U19

- UEFA European Under-19 Championship: 2023
