= Francesco Di Bartolo (footballer) =

Italian footballer (born 2005)

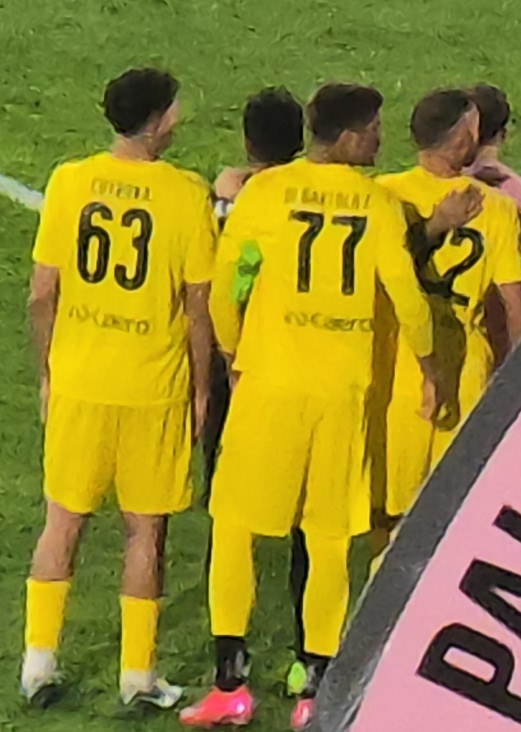
- Di Bartolo (no. 77) playing for Palermo in 2025

Personal information
- Full name: Francesco Di Bartolo Zuccarello
- Date of birth: 18 March 2005 (age 21)
- Place of birth: Udine, Italy
- Height: 1.92 m (6 ft 4 in)
- Position: Goalkeeper

Team information
- Current team: Team Altamura (on loan from Palermo)
- Number: 1

Youth career
- 2013–2023: Udinese

Senior career*
Years	Team	Apps	(Gls)
2023–2024	Lommel	0	(0)
2024–	Palermo	0	(0)
2025–2026	→ Nuova Sondrio (loan)	7	(0)
2026–	→ Team Altamura (loan)	0	(0)

International career^{‡}
2022–2023	Italy U18	2	(0)
2023–2024	Italy U19	1	(0)
- * Club domestic league appearances and goals as of 24 August 2026 ‡ National team caps and goals as of 9 August 2023

Francesco Di Bartolo Zuccarello (born 18 March 2005) is an Italian professional footballer who plays as a goalkeeper for Serie C Group C club Team Altamura, on loan from Palermo.

== Club career ==
Born and raised in Udine, Di Bartolo joined Udinese's academy in 2013; he then came through the club's youth ranks, as he eventually started training with the first team during the 2022–23 season, while also featuring for their under-19 squad.

On 8 July 2023, Di Bartolo officially joined Belgian side Lommel on a permanent deal, signing a five-year contract with the club.

On 25 July 2024, Di Bartolo joined Serie B side Palermo for an undisclosed fee, signing a four-year contract. Four days later, the club reported that he had sustained a fracture to the fifth metatarsal bone of his right foot during a training session, thus being forced to undergo rehabilitation.

On 2 September 2025, with no first team appearances for the Rosanero, Di Bartolo was loaned out to Serie D amateur club Nuova Sondrio, coached by former Palermo player and 2006 FIFA World Cup-winning goalkeeper Marco Amelia. On 15 January 2026, Palermo recalled Di Bartolo from loan early.

== International career ==
Di Bartolo has represented Italy at the youth international level, having played for the under-18 and under-19 national teams.

In June 2024, he was included by head coach Bernardo Corradi in the Italian preliminary squad for the UEFA European Under-19 Championship in Northern Ireland; however, he was left out of the final squad.

== Personal life ==
Di Bartolo's father is from Palermo, while his grandfather is from Agrigento.
