= Lorenzo Amatucci =

Italian footballer (born 2004)

Personal information
- Date of birth: 5 February 2004 (age 22)
- Place of birth: Arezzo, Italy
- Height: 1.72 m (5 ft 8 in)
- Position: Midfielder

Team information
- Current team: Deportivo A Coruña
- Number: 16

Youth career
- Fiorentina

Senior career*
| Years | Team | Apps | (Gls) |
| 2023–2026 | Fiorentina | 2 | (0) |
| 2024 | → Ternana (loan) | 16 | (0) |
| 2024–2025 | → Salernitana (loan) | 36 | (3) |
| 2025–2026 | → Las Palmas (loan) | 40 | (0) |
| 2026– | Deportivo A Coruña | 9 | (0) |

International career^{‡}
| 2021–2022 | Italy U18 | 8 | (0) |
| 2022–2023 | Italy U19 | 11 | (0) |
| 2023–2024 | Italy U20 | 5 | (1) |
| 2026– | Italy U21 | 2 | (0) |
Medal record
Men's football
Representing Italy
UEFA European Under-19 Championship
| Winner | 2023 Malta |
Mediterranean Games
| Runner-up | Oran 2022 | U-18 Team |
- * Club domestic league appearances and goals as of 08:38, 5 November 2026 (UTC) ‡ National team caps and goals as of 16 November 2026

Lorenzo Amatucci (born 5 February 2004) is an Italian professional footballer who plays as a midfielder for La Liga club Deportivo A Coruña.

== Club career ==
=== Fiorentina ===
Born in Arezzo and raised in Subbiano, Amatucci came through the youth ranks at Fiorentina, where he broke through the under-19 team during the 2021–22 season, winning the Coppa Italia Primavera in the process. He signed his first professional contract with the club in August 2022. In the following campaign, the midfielder started training with the first team, under manager Vincenzo Italiano, before winning the Supercoppa Primavera and reaching another Coppa Italia final with the club's under-19 squad.

On 3 September 2023, Amatucci made his professional – and Serie A – debut for Fiorentina, coming on as a substitute for Arthur in the 75th minute of a 4–0 loss to Inter. The following day, he was included in the squad for the group stage of the UEFA Europa Conference League.

==== Loan to Ternana ====
On 1 February 2024, Amatucci was loaned out to Serie B club Ternana until the end of the season.

==== Loan to Salernitana ====
On 30 July 2024, he was loaned out to Serie B club Salernitana until the end of the season.

==== Loan to Las Palmas ====
On 20 July 2025, Amatucci moved on a new loan to Las Palmas in Spain, with an option to buy.

=== Deportivo A Coruña ===
On 9 July 2026, he joined newly La Liga promoted club Deportivo A Coruña on a five-year contract.

== International career ==
Amatucci has represented Italy at under-18, under-19 and under-20 level.

He was included in the squad that took part in the 2022 Mediterranean Games in Oran, where Italy eventually won the silver medal after losing to France in the final match.

In June 2023, he was included in the Italian squad for the UEFA European Under-19 Championship in Malta, where the Azzurrini eventually won their second continental title.

In September 2023, he received his first call-up to the Italian under-20 national team. He scored his first goal for the team on 11 September, in a 1–0 away victory over Czech Republic in the Under 20 Elite League.

== Style of play ==
Amatucci is a central midfielder, who can also play in a more defensive role. A right-footed and versatile player, he has mainly been regarded for his positioning, his long-range shooting, his vision, his ability on free kicks and his leadership skills.

Although he has been compared to Lucas Torreira, he cited Xavi as his biggest source of inspiration.

== Career statistics ==
As of match played 2 November 2026

Appearances and goals by club, season and competition
| Club | Season | League | | | Cup | | Europe | | Other | | Total | |
| Club | Season | Division | Apps | Goals | Apps | Goals | Apps | Goals | Apps | Goals | Apps | Goals |
|---|---|---|---|---|---|---|---|---|---|---|---|---|
| Fiorentina | 2023–24 | Serie A | 2 | 0 | 0 | 0 | 0 | 0 | 0 | 0 | 2 | 0 |
| Ternana (loan) | 2023–24 | Serie B | 16 | 0 | — | | — | | 2 (Note: Appearances in the Serie B relegation play-out) | 0 | 18 | 0 |
| Salernitana (loan) | 2024–25 | Serie B | 36 | 0 | 2 | 0 | — | | 2 (Note: Appearances in the Serie B relegation play-out) | 0 | 40 | 0 |
| Las Palmas (loan) | 2025−26 | Segunda División | 40 | 0 | 0 | 0 | — | | 2 (Note: Appearances in the Segunda División promotion play-offs) | 0 | 42 | 0 |
| Deportivo A Coruña | 2026−27 | La Liga | 9 | 0 | 0 | 0 | — | | 0 | 0 | 9 | 0 |
| Career total | | | 103 | 0 | 2 | 0 | 0 | 0 | 6 | 0 | 111 | 0 |

== Honours ==
Fiorentina U19

- Coppa Italia Primavera: 2021–22
- Supercoppa Primavera: 2022–23

Italy U19

- UEFA European Under-19 Championship: 2023
