= 2025–26 Delfino Pescara 1936 season =

Delfino Pescara 1936
2025–26 season
- Manager: Vincenzo Vivarini
- Stadium: Stadio Adriatico – Giovanni Cornacchia
- Serie B: 17th
- Coppa Italia: First round
- Top goalscorer: League: Giacomo Olzer (2); All: Giacomo Olzer (2)

During the 2025–26 season, Delfino Pescara 1936 is competing in its 90th season and its first campaign in Serie B since 2021. The club also took part in the Coppa Italia, where it was eliminated by Parma in the first round. On 2 July, Pescara officially announced the appointment of Vincenzo Vivarini as head coach on a one-year contract, to be automatically renewed in the event that the team avoids relegation.

== Squad ==
=== Transfers In ===
Pos.	Player	Transferred from	Fee	Date	Source
MF	(Estonia) Georgi Tunjov	(Italy) Pineto	Free	1 July 2025	
DF	(Italy) Matteo Milan	(Italy) Ravenna	Free	1 July 2025	
MF	(Italy) Giacomo Olzer	(Italy) Brescia	Free	1 July 2025	
FW	(Italy) Gianmarco Cangiano	(Italy) Bologna	Undisclosed	1 July 2025	
DF	(Italy) Gaetano Letizia	(Italy) Union Brescia	Free	21 July 2025	
GK	(Italy) Sebastiano Desplanches	(Italy) Palermo FC	Loan	8 August 2025	
MF	(Netherlands) Julian Brandes	(Netherlands) Jong Ajax	Free	19 August 2025	
MF	(Italy) Andrea Oliveri	(Italy) Atalanta U23	Loan	19 August 2025	
FW	(Italy) Alessandro Vinciguerra	(Italy) Cagliari U20	Loan	29 August 2025	
MF	(Italy) Fabrizio Caligara	(Italy) Sassuolo	Loan	1 September 2025	
FW	(Nigeria) Orji Okwonkwo	(Italy) Bologna	Loan	1 September 2025	
MF	(Italy) Tommaso Corazza	(Italy) Bologna	Loan	1 September 2025	
FW	(Italy) Frank Tsadjout	(Italy) Cremonese	Loan	1 September 2025	
DF	(Guadeloupe) Andreaw Gravillon	(Turkey) Adana Demirspor	Undisclosed	11 September 2025	

=== Transfers Out ===
Pos.	Player	Transferred to	Fee	Date	Source
DF	(Italy) Gaetano Letizia	(Italy) Feralpisalò	Loan return	30 June 2025	
MF	(Italy) Roberto Pierno	(Italy) Campobasso	Undisclosed	1 July 2025	
FW	(Italy) Simone Castigliani			1 July 2025	
DF	(Italy) Matteo Milan	(Italy) Giugliano	Loan	28 August 2025	
FW	(Italy) Andrea Ferraris	(Italy) Salernitana	Loan	1 September 2025	
MF	(Italy) Giuseppe Saccomanni	(Italy) Pineto	Loan	1 September 2025	
MF	(Estonia) Georgi Tunjov		Contract terminated	1 September 2025	
FW	(Canada) Michael Zeppieri	(Italy) Torino U20	Loan	1 September 2025	

== Friendlies ==
19 July 2025	Pescara	6–0	Collecorvino

22 July 2025	Pescara	3–0	(Belgium) Tubize-Braine

2 August 2025	Pescara	4–2	Potenza

== Competitions ==
=== Overall record ===
Competition	First match	Last match	Starting round	Final position	Record							
Competition	First match	Last match	Starting round	Final position	Pld	W	D	L	GF	GA	GD	Win %
Serie B	22 August 2025	8–10 May 2025	Matchday 1		4	1	1	2	8	7	+1	25.00
Coppa Italia	10 August 2025	17 August 2025	Preliminary round	First round	2	1	0	1	1	2	−1	50.00
Total					6	2	1	3	9	9	+0	33.33

Last updated: 21 September 2025
Source: Competitions

=== Serie B ===
==== League table ====
Pos	Team	Pld	W	D	L	GF	GA	GD	Pts	Promotion, qualification or relegation
16	Südtirol (O)	38	8	17	13	38	48	−10	41	Qualification for relegation play-out
17	Bari (R)	38	10	10	18	38	60	−22	40	Qualification for relegation play-out
18	Reggiana (R)	38	9	10	19	36	56	−20	37	Relegation to Serie C
19	Spezia (R)	38	8	11	19	43	59	−16	35 (Note: Spezia finished ahead of Pescara on head-to-head points: Spezia 2–1 Pescara, Pescara 1–1 Spezia.)	Relegation to Serie C
20	Pescara (R)	38	7	14	17	51	66	−15	35	Relegation to Serie C

Source: Serie BKT
Rules for classification: 1) Points; 2) Head-to-head points; 3) Head-to-head goal difference; 4) Goal difference; 5) Goals scored; 6) Draw.
(Note: Head-to-head record is used only after all the matches between the teams in question have been played)
(O) Play-off winners; (R) Relegated

==== Results summary ====
Overall								Home						Away					
Pld	W	D	L	GF	GA	GD	Pts	W	D	L	GF	GA	GD	W	D	L	GF	GA	GD
38	7	14	17	51	66	−15	35	5	7	7	28	26	+2	2	7	10	23	40	−17

==== Results by round ====
Round	1	2	3	4
Ground	H	A	H	H
Result	L	L	D	W
Position	16	19	17	

Updated to match(es) played on 21 September 2025. Source:
A = Away; H = Home; W = Win; D = Draw; L = Loss

==== Matches ====
22 August 2025 1	Pescara	1–3	Cesena	Pescara
19:30 UTC+2	Olzer 35'; Oliveri (yellow card) 79'		Blesa 31'; Shpendi 48'; Bisoli 63'; Frabotta (yellow card) 63'	Stadium: Stadio Adriatico – Giovanni Cornacchia; Attendance: 11,220; Referee: Francesco Fourneau

30 August 2025 2	Mantova	2–1	Pescara	Mantua
18:00 UTC+2	Mancuso 29' (pen.), (yellow card) 52'; Radaelli (yellow card) 44'; Mantovani (yellow card) 51'; Bani (yellow card) 68'; Fiori 86'		Oliveri (yellow card) 48'; Festa 53' (o.g.); Corbo (yellow card) 90+1'	Stadium: Stadio Danilo Martelli; Attendance: 7,566; Referee: Giuseppe Mucera

13 September 2025 3	Pescara	2–2	Venezia	Pescara
14:00 UTC+2	Desplanches (yellow card) 67'; Olzer 79'; Di Nardo 90+1'		Adorante 20'; Fila 66'; Haps (yellow card) 90+5'	Stadium: Stadio Adriatico – Giovanni Cornacchia; Attendance: 8,076; Referee: Federico Dionisi

21 September 2025 4	Pescara	4–0	Empoli	Pescara
16:15 UTC+2	Capellini (yellow card) 60'; Oliveri 68', 71'; Meazzi 80'; Merola 90+2'		Curto (yellow card) 23'; Guarino (yellow card) 65'	Stadium: Stadio Adriatico – Giovanni Cornacchia; Attendance: 8,985; Referee: Marco Di Bello

28 September 2025 5	Modena	2–1	Pescara	Modena
16:15 UTC+2	Tonoli (yellow card) 7'; Cauz (yellow card) 9'; Di Mariano (yellow card) 12'; Gliozzi 52' (pen.); Sersanti 58'		Pellacani (yellow card) 3'; Olzer 40'; Brosco (yellow card) 56'; Valzania (yellow card) 64'	Stadium: Stadio Alberto Braglia; Attendance: 11,259; Referee: Claudio Giuseppe Allegretta

1 October 2025 6	Pescara	1–1	Südtirol	Pescara
19:30 UTC+2	Olzer (yellow card) 20'; Meazzi 90+5', (yellow card) 90+7'		S. Davi (yellow card) 29'; Mallamo (yellow card) 32'; Coulibaly 65'; Italeng (yellow card) 90+4'	Stadium: Stadio Adriatico; Attendance: 5,971; Referee: Luca Massimi

5 October 2025 7	Sampdoria	4–1	Pescara	Genoa
16:15 UTC+2	Vulikić (yellow card) 31'; Coda 56' (pen.); Pio Riccio (yellow card) 59'; Pafundi 63'; Depaoli 66'; Ioannou 90+1'		Oliveri 44'; Brosco (yellow card) 70' (red card) 90+3'	Stadium: Stadio Luigi Ferraris; Attendance: 23,039; Referee: Luca Pairetto

18 October 2025 8	Pescara	2–2	Carrarese	Pescara
14:00 UTC+2	Oliveri (yellow card) 5'; Letizia (yellow card) 45'; Meazzi 74'; Di Nardo 88'		Abiuso 2'; Schiavi (yellow card) 29'; Hasa (yellow card) 45', (goal) 51'	Stadium: Stadio Adriatico; Attendance: 6,982; Referee: Kevin Bonacina

25 October 2025 9	Virtus Entella	1–1	Pescara	Chiavari
14:00 UTC+2	Marconi (yellow card) 25'; Parodi (yellow card) 46'; Tiritiello 90+3'		Di Nardo 73'; Caligara (yellow card) 90+2'	Stadium: Stadio Comunale; Attendance: 2,369; Referee: Giuseppe Mucera

28 October 2025 10	Pescara	1–1	Avellino	Pescara
20:30 UTC+2	Capellini 5'; Valzania (yellow card) 17'		Sounas (yellow card) 19'; Šimić 29'; Missori (yellow card) 41'; Tutino (yellow card) 90+4'	Stadium: Stadio Adriatico; Attendance: 7,987; Referee: Andrea Calzavara

1 November 2025 11	Palermo	5–0	Pescara	Palermo
19:30 UTC+2	Pierozzi 23', 58'; Segre 46'; Bereszyński (yellow card) 71'; Brunori 72', (yellow card) 73'; Vasić (yellow card) 80'; Diakité 83'		Brandes (yellow card) 32'; Dagasso (yellow card) 75'	Stadium: Stadio Renzo Barbera; Attendance: 27,077; Referee: Andrea Zanotti

9 November 2025 12	Pescara	0–2	Monza	Pescara
17:15 UTC+2	Corbo (yellow card) 11'		Baldé (yellow card) 16', (goal) 27'; Colpani 47'	Stadium: Stadio Adriatico; Attendance: 7,205; Referee: Luca Pairetto

21 November 2025 13	Catanzaro	3–3	Pescara	Catanzaro
20:30 UTC+2	Brihenti 21', (yellow card) 59'; Pittarello 46', (yellow card) 87'; Frosinini (yellow card) 80'; Buso 82', (yellow card) 83'; Antonini (yellow card) 90+2'		Di Nardo 10'; Dagasso (yellow card) 20'; Corazza 37', 90+3'; Corbo (yellow card) 55'; Caligara (yellow card) 74'	Stadium: Stadio Nicola Ceravolo; Attendance: 8,031; Referee: Luca Massimi

29 November 2025 14	Pescara	0–1	Padova	Pescara
15:00 UTC+2			Capelli (yellow card) 27'; Harder (yellow card) 40'; Crisetig (yellow card) 47'; Faedo 57', (yellow card) 61'; Perrotta (yellow card) 86'	Stadium: Stadio Adriatico – Giovanni Cornacchia; Attendance: 6,784; Referee: Livio Marinelli

8 December 2025 15	Bari	1–1	Pescara	Bari
17:15 UTC+2	Dorval (yellow card) 35'; Nikolaou (yellow card) 60'; Moncini (penalty missed) 65'; Meroni (yellow card) 67' (red card) 90+7'; Castrovilli (yellow card) 72'; Braunöder (yellow card) 73'; Maggiore 82'		Di Nardo 9', (yellow card) 56'; Olzer (red card) 31'; Letizia (yellow card) 59'; Desplanches (yellow card) 81'	Stadium: Stadio San Nicola; Attendance: 8,431; Referee: Matteo Marcenaro

14 December 2025 16	Pescara	1–2	Calcio	Pescara
17:15 UTC+2	Tonin 1'; Valzania (yellow card) 28'; Faraoni (yellow card) 38'; Brosco (yellow card) 90+3'		Koutsoupias 5', (yellow card) 85'; Bracaglia (yellow card) 45'; A. Oyono 56'; Palmisani (yellow card) 80'	Stadium: Stadio Adriatico; Attendance: 6,703; Referee: Paride Tremolada

20 December 2025 17	Pescara	2–1	Reggiana	Pescara
19:30 UTC+2	Gravillon (yellow card) 4'; Corazza 11'; Olzer 61'		Rozzio (yellow card) 2'; Rover 15'; Portanova (yellow card) 45+2'; Vallarelli (yellow card) 48'; Bozzolan (yellow card) 54'	Stadium: Stadio Adriatico; Attendance: 5,588; Referee: Ermanno Feliciani

27 December 2025 18	Spezia	2–1	Pescara	La Spezia
12:30 UTC+2	Di Serio 8'; Kouda (yellow card) 20'; Artistico 90+2'		Capellini (yellow card) 23'; Dagasso 45+7'; Valzania (yellow card) 56'; Caligara (yellow card) 90+7'	Stadium: Stadio Alberto Picco; Attendance: 9,251; Referee: Andrea Zanotti

10 January 2026 19	Juve Stabia	2–2	Pescara	Castellammare di Stabia
17:15 UTC+2	Mosti (yellow card) 33'; Ruggero (yellow card) 52'; Correia 68'; Candellone 89' (pen.)		Olzer 35'; Brosco (yellow card) 44'; Capellini (yellow card) 56'; Corazza (yellow card) 80'; Valzania (yellow card) 82'; Sgarbi 90+3', (yellow card) 90+4'	Stadium: Stadio Romeo Menti; Attendance: 3,688; Referee: Marco Piccinini

18 January 2026 20	Pescara	0–2	Modena	Pescara
15:00 UTC+2			Zampano 27'; De Luca 44'; Cotali (yellow card) 85'; Gerli (yellow card) 90+1'	Stadium: Stadio Adriatico – Giovanni Cornacchia; Attendance: 7,556; Referee: Gianluca Manganiello

24 January 2026 21	Monza	3–0	Pescara	Monza
15:00 UTC+2	Baldé (yellow card) 2'; Hernani 34', 49'; Lucchesi (yellow card) 45'; Obiang (yellow card) 48'; Colombo (yellow card) 75'; Marić (yellow card) 76'; Azzi 78'		Letizia (yellow card) 28'; Gravillon (yellow card) 83'	Stadium: Stadio Brianteo; Attendance: 4,713; Referee: Ivano Pezzuto

31 January 2026 22	Pescara	2–2	Mantova	Pescara
17:15 UTC+2	Caligara 30'; Olzer (yellow card) 56'; Brosco (yellow card) 58'; Meazzi (yellow card) 69', (goal) 73'; Gravillon (yellow card) 87'		Ruocco 17' (pen.), 60', (yellow card) 70'; Gonçalves (yellow card) 37'; Radaelli (yellow card) 44'	Stadium: Stadio Adriatico – Giovanni Cornacchia; Attendance: 7,728; Referee: Rosario Abisso

6 February 2026 23	Cesena	2–0	Pescara	Cesena
20:30 UTC+2	Castagnetti (yellow card) 11'; Berti 25', (yellow card) 45'; Mangraviti (yellow card) 29'; Piacentini (yellow card) 71'; Francesconi 77'; Klinsmann (yellow card) 90+6'		Bettella (yellow card) 88'	Stadium: Stadio Dino Manuzzi; Attendance: 13,315; Referee: Valerio Crezzini

10 February 2026 24	Pescara	0–2	Catanzaro	Pescara
20:00 UTC+2	Fanne (yellow card) 38'; Corbo (yellow card) 57'; Capellini (yellow card) 59'		Iemmello 30'; Nuamah (yellow card) 32'; Frosinini (yellow card) 45+4'; Antonini (yellow card) 55'; Alesi 79'	Stadium: Stadio Adriatico – Giovanni Cornacchia; Attendance: 6,972; Referee: Simone Galipò

15 February 2026 25	Avellino	0–1	Pescara	Avellino
19:30 UTC+2	Cancellotti (yellow card) 6'; Biasci (yellow card) 36'; Missori (yellow card) 38'; Le Borgne (yellow card) 45+4'		Cagnano (yellow card) 11'; Olzer (yellow card) 72'; Brugman (yellow card) 73', (goal) 85'; Gravillon (yellow card) 90+2'	Stadium: Stadio Partenio-Adriano Lombardi; Attendance: 9,223; Referee: Andrea Calzavara

21 February 2026 26	Venezia	3–2	Pescara	Venice
15:00 UTC+2	Adorante 41'; Yeboah 45+1'; Busio (yellow card) 63'; Hainaut 76'		Di Nardo 18', 58'; Gravillon (yellow card) 43'; Cagnano (yellow card) 68'; Brugman (yellow card) 70'; Olzer (yellow card) 89'	Stadium: Stadio Pier Luigi Penzo; Attendance: 11,664; Referee: Alberto Arena

1 March 2026 27	Pescara	2–1	Palermo	Pescara
15:00 UTC+2	Acampora (yellow card) 50'; Insigne 55'; Meazzi 87'; Bettella (yellow card) 89'; Di Nardo (yellow card) 90'; Brugman (yellow card) 90+2'		Peda (yellow card) 45'; Pohjanpalo 47'; Ranocchia (yellow card) 52'	Stadium: Stadio Adriatico-Giovanni Cornacchia; Attendance: 6,478; Referee: Fabio Maresca

4 March 2026 28	Frosinone	2–2	Pescara	Frosinone
20:00 UTC+2	Calò 85' (pen.); Raimondo 90+4', (yellow card) 90+4'		Di Nardo 2', 33'; Bettella (yellow card) 65'; Brandes (yellow card) 78'; Altare (red card) 82'	Stadium: Stadio Benito Stirpe; Attendance: 11,289; Referee: Davide Di Marco

8 March 2026 29	Pescara	4–0	Bari	Pescara
19:30 UTC+2	Di Nardo 13', 47', (yellow card) 30'; Insigne 40' (pen.); Valzania 56'; Berardi (yellow card) 79'		De Pieri (yellow card) 28'	Stadium: Stadio Adriatico; Attendance: 9,807; Referee: Simone Galipò

15 March 2026 30	Südtirol	0–0	Pescara	Bolzano
17:15 UTC+2	Casiraghi (yellow card) 21'; Zedadka (yellow card) 49'; Veseli (yellow card) 76'; Tait (red card) 77'; Pecorino (yellow card) 84'; Masiello (yellow card) 90+3'		Valzania (yellow card) 65'	Stadium: Stadio Druso; Attendance: 3,969; Referee: Claudio Giuseppe Allegretta

18 March 2026 31	Pescara	3–0	Virtus Entella	Pescara
20:00 UTC+2	Cagnano 20'; Letizia (yellow card) 27'; Caligar 43'; Insigne 56'		Vecchia (yellow card) 84'; Squizzato (yellow card) 90+3'	Stadium: Stadio Adriatico; Attendance: 7,095; Referee: Ivano Pezzuto

22 March 2026 32	Empoli	4–2	Pescara	Empoli
15:00 UTC+2	Yepes (yellow card) 2'; Shpendi 9', 65'; Degli Innocenti (yellow card) 26'; Lovato 33'; Fila 80'		Acampora (red card) 13'; Di Nardo (yellow card) 32', (goal) 41', 47'; Cagnano (yellow card) 49'	Stadium: Stadio Carlo Castellani; Attendance: 6,848; Referee: Antonio Rapuano

6 April 2026 33	Reggiana	1–3	Pescara	Reggio Emilia
14:00 UTC+2	Lambourde 68'; Tripaldelli (red card) 90+6'		Olzer 21'; Insigne 50', (yellow card) 63'; Berardi (yellow card) 68'; Meazzi 89'; Gravillon (yellow card) 90+1'	Stadium: Mapei Stadium – Città del Tricolore; Attendance: 9,005; Referee: Livio Marinelli

11 April 2026 34	Pescara	1–2	Sampdoria	Pescara
14:00 UTC+2	Valzania (yellow card) 32'; Bettella (yellow card) 42'; Di Nardo 45+3' (pen.); Meazzi (yellow card) 83'		Viti (yellow card) 21'; Pierini (yellow card) 27'; Ricci (yellow card) 76'; Conti 82'; Depaoli 90+3', (yellow card) 90+4'	Stadium: Stadio Adriatico – Giovanni Cornacchia; Attendance: 16,587; Referee: Marco Piccinini

19 April 2026 35	Carrarese	2–2	Pescara	Carrara
14:00 UTC+2	Distefano 19'; Ruggeri (yellow card) 45'; Bouah 84'		Acampora (yellow card) 22', (goal) 61'; Letizia 35'	Stadium: Stadio dei Marmi; Attendance: 4,967; Referee: Ivano Pezzuto

25 April 2026 36	Pescara	1–1	Juve Stabia	Pescara
14:00 UTC+2	Insigne 51'; Valzania (yellow card) 57'; Altare (yellow card) 90+5'		Ricciardi (yellow card) 23'; Cacciamani (yellow card) 34'; Diakité (yellow card) 50'; Correia (yellow card) 57', (goal) 61'	Stadium: Stadio Adriatico – Giovanni Cornacchia; Attendance: 13,823; Referee: Daniele Perenzoni

1 May 2026 37	Padova	1–0	Pescara	Padua
14:00 UTC+2	Fusi (yellow card) 45+2'; Belli (yellow card) 63'; Villa (yellow card) 79'; Pastina 90+4'		Cagnano (yellow card) 42'; Insigne (yellow card) 90'; Merola (yellow card) 90+7'; stadium = Stadio Euganeo	Attendance: 10,068; Referee: Giuseppe Collu

8 May 2026 38	Pescara	1–1	Spezia	Pescara
19:30 UTC+2	Faraoni 10'; Letizia (yellow card) 41'		Vignali (yellow card) 33'; Romano (yellow card) 70'; Artistico 73'; Nagy (yellow card) 81'	Stadium: Stadio Adriatico – Giovanni Cornacchia; Attendance: 10,994; Referee: Daniele Doveri

=== Coppa Italia ===
10 August 2025 Preliminary round	Pescara	1–0	Rimini	Pescara
19:30 UTC+2	Valzania 44', (yellow card) 56'		Lepri (yellow card) 9'; Garetto (yellow card) 17'; De Vitis (yellow card) 37'; Fabbri (yellow card) 39'	Stadium: Stadio Adriatico – Giovanni Cornacchia; Attendance: 4,610; Referee: Lucio Felica Angelillo

17 August 2025 First round	Parma	2–0	Pescara	Parma
17:30 UTC+2	Keita (yellow card) 26'; Pellegrino 47', 65'; Bernabé (yellow card) 57'			Stadium: Stadio Ennio Tardini; Attendance: 11,300; Referee: Valerio Crezzini
