= 2023–24 Delfino Pescara 1936 season =

Delfino Pescara 1936
2023–24 season
- Chairman: Daniele Sebastiani
- Manager: Zdeněk Zeman (until 22 February); Giovanni Bucaro (from 22 February to 16 March); Emmanuel Cascione (from 18 March)
- Stadium: Stadio Adriatico – Giovanni Cornacchia
- Serie C: 6th
- Coppa Italia Serie C: Quarter-finals

The 2023–24 season is Delfino Pescara 1936's 88th season in existence and first one back in the Serie C. They are also competing in the Coppa Italia Serie C.

== Players ==
=== First-team squad ===
As of 1 September 2023

Note: Flags indicate national team as defined under FIFA eligibility rules; some limited exceptions apply. Players may hold more than one non-FIFA nationality.

No.	Pos.	Nation	Player
1	GK	ITA	Giuseppe Ciocci (on loan from Cagliari)
2	DF	ITA	Lorenzo Milani
5	DF	ITA	Davide Di Pasquale (on loan from Arezzo)
6	MF	ITA	Niccolò Squizzato
7	FW	ITA	Michele Masala
8	MF	ITA	Salvatore Aloi
9	FW	ITA	Edoardo Vergani
10	FW	ITA	Davide Merola (on loan from Empoli)
11	MF	ITA	Federico Accornero (on loan from Genoa)
13	DF	ITA	Riccardo Brosco
15	DF	ITA	Romano Floriani Mussolini (on loan from Lazio)
17	MF	EST	Georgi Tunjov
18	DF	ITA	Roberto Pierno

No.	Pos.	Nation	Player
19	MF	ITA	Luca Mora
20	MF	ITA	Denis Manu
22	GK	ITA	Alessandro Plizzari
23	DF	ITA	Filippo Pellacani
24	DF	SVK	Ivan Mesík
25	DF	MDA	Cornelius Staver
27	DF	ITA	Brando Moruzzi
28	MF	ITA	Antonino De Marco
29	FW	ITA	Luigi Cuppone
30	MF	ITA	Matteo Dagasso
31	FW	ITA	Christian Tommasini
33	MF	ITA	Simone Franchini (on loan from Padova)

=== Out on loan ===
Note: Flags indicate national team as defined under FIFA eligibility rules; some limited exceptions apply. Players may hold more than one non-FIFA nationality.

No. / Pos. / Nation / Player; — / FW / ALB / Aristidi Kolaj (at Lumezzane until 30 June 2024)	No. / Pos. / Nation / Player; — / FW / ARG / Facundo Lescano (at Triestina until 30 June 2024)

== Transfers ==
=== In ===
Pos.	Player	Transferred from	Fee	Date	Source
FW	(Italy) Luigi Cuppone	(Italy) Cittadella	€80,000	1 July 2023	
DF	(Italy) Roberto Pierno	(Italy) Lecce	Free	15 July 2023	
GK	(Italy) Giuseppe Ciocci	(Italy) Cagliari	Loan	16 July 2023	
MF	(Italy) Gianmarco Cangiano	(Italy) Bologna	Loan	10 August 2023	

=== Out ===
Pos.	Player	Transferred to	Fee	Date	Source
FW	(Italy) Gennaro Borrelli	(Italy) Frosinone	€300,000	1 July 2023	
FW	(Slovakia) Ľubomír Tupta	(Czech Republic) Slovan Liberec	€100,000	1 July 2023	
MF	(Italy) Luca Palmiero	(Italy) Avellino	€125,000	14 July 2023	
MF	(Tunisia) Hamza Rafia	(Italy) Lecce	€800,000	18 July 2023	

== Pre-season and friendlies ==
Win Draw Loss Fixtures

24 July 2023 Friendly	Pescara	17–0	Manoppello
18:00 CEST (UTC+2)

28 July 2023 Friendly	Pescara	11–0	Castrum Silvi
18:00 CEST (UTC+2)

1 August 2023 Friendly	Pescara	11–0	Villa 2015
18:00 CEST (UTC+2)

== Competitions ==
=== Overall record ===
Competition	First match	Last match	Starting round	Final position	Record							
Competition	First match	Last match	Starting round	Final position	Pld	W	D	L	GF	GA	GD	Win %
Serie C	2 September 2023	28 April 2024	Matchday 1	6th	38	16	7	15	60	55	+5	42.11
Promotion play-offs	7 May 2024	11 May 2024	First round	Second round	2	0	1	1	3	5	−2	0.00
Coppa Italia Serie C	5 October 2023	13 December 2023	First round	Quarter-finals	4	3	0	1	9	3	+6	75.00
Total					44	19	8	17	72	63	+9	43.18

Source: Soccerway

=== Serie C ===
==== League table ====
Pos	Team	Pld	W	D	L	GF	GA	GD	Pts	Qualification
4	Perugia	38	17	12	9	44	35	+9	63	Group play-offs 2nd round
5	Gubbio	38	16	11	11	50	38	+12	59	Group play-offs 1st round
6	Pescara	38	16	7	15	60	55	+5	55	Group play-offs 1st round
7	Juventus Next Gen	38	15	9	14	50	44	+6	54	Group play-offs 1st round
8	Arezzo	38	14	11	13	46	44	+2	53	Group play-offs 1st round

Updated to match(es) played on 28 April 2024. Source: Lega Pro, Soccerway (in English)
Rules for classification: 1) Points; 2) Head-to-head points; 3) Head-to-head goal difference; 4) Goal difference; 5) Goals scored; 6) Lower goals against; 7) Wins; 8) Lower losses; 9) Away wins; 10) Lower home losses.
(Note: Head-to-head record is used only after all the matches between the teams in question have been played)

==== Results summary ====
Overall								Home						Away					
Pld	W	D	L	GF	GA	GD	Pts	W	D	L	GF	GA	GD	W	D	L	GF	GA	GD
38	16	7	15	60	55	+5	55	8	5	6	28	20	+8	8	2	9	32	35	−3

Source: Worldfootball

==== Matches ====
The league fixtures were unveiled on 7 August 2023.

2 September 2023 1	Pescara	3–1	Juventus Next Gen	Pescara
20:45 CEST (UTC+2)	Cuppone 11', 42'; Accornero 34'; Pierno (yellow card) 55'	Report	Hasa (yellow card) 39'; Guerra 53', (yellow card) 72'; Huijsen (yellow card) 73'	Stadium: Stadio Adriatico – Giovanni Cornacchia; Referee: Domenico Mirabella

10 September 2023 2	Perugia	1–1	Pescara	Perugia
20:45 CEST (UTC+2)				Stadium: Stadio Renato Curi; Referee: Marco Emmanuele

16 September 2023 3	Pescara	3–2	Arezzo	Pescara
20:45 CEST (UTC+2)				Stadium: Stadio Adriatico – Giovanni Cornacchia; Referee: Leonardo Mastrodomenico

19 September 2023 4	Sestri Levante	1–2	Pescara	Sestri Levante
20:45 CEST (UTC+2)				Referee: Leonardo Mastrodomenico

2 October 2023 6	Pescara	3–2	Gubbio	Pescara
20:30 CEST (UTC+2)				Stadium: Stadio Adriatico – Giovanni Cornacchia; Referee: Galipo Di Firenze

8 October 2023 7	SPAL	1–2	Pescara	Ferrara
18:30 CEST (UTC+2)	Celia 42'		Tunjov 21' (pen.); Cangiano 90'	Stadium: Stadio Paolo Mazza; Referee: Stefano Nicolini

11 October 2023 5	Pineto	1–0	Pescara	Pineto
20:45 CEST (UTC+2)				Referee: Andrea Zanotti

16 October 2023 8	Pescara	0–0	Vis Pesaro	Pescara
--:-- CEST (UTC+2)				Stadium: Stadio Adriatico – Giovanni Cornacchia

22 October 2023 9	Lucchese	1–4	Pescara	Lucca
--:-- CEST (UTC+2)

25 October 2023 10	Pescara	1–2	Torres	Pescara
--:-- CEST (UTC+2)				Stadium: Stadio Adriatico – Giovanni Cornacchia

29 October 2023 11	Pescara	2–3	Recanatese	Pescara
--:-- CEST (UTC+2)				Stadium: Stadio Adriatico – Giovanni Cornacchia

5 November 2023 12	Carrarese	1–0	Pescara	Carrara
--:-- CET (UTC+1)

13 November 2023 13	Pescara	1–1	Rimini	Pescara
20:45 CET (UTC+1)	Milani 3'		Morra 35'	Stadium: Stadio Adriatico – Giovanni Cornacchia; Referee: Abdoulaye Diop

25 November 2023 15	Pescara	0–1	Cesena	Pescara
--:-- CET (UTC+1)				Stadium: Stadio Adriatico – Giovanni Cornacchia

2 December 2023 16	Virtus Entella	1–2	Pescara	Chiavari
--:-- CET (UTC+1)

5 December 2023 14	Pontedera	0–5	Pescara	Pontedera
--:-- CET (UTC+1)

9 December 2023 17	Pescara	4–0	Olbia	Pescara
--:-- CET (UTC+1)				Stadium: Stadio Adriatico – Giovanni Cornacchia

17 December 2023 18	Ancona	1–1	Pescara	Ancona
--:-- CET (UTC+1)

23 December 2023 19	Pescara	1–1	Fermana	Pescara
--:-- CET (UTC+1)				Stadium: Stadio Adriatico – Giovanni Cornacchia

7 January 2024 20	Juventus Next Gen	4–3	Pescara	Alessandria
14:00 CET (UTC+1)	Damiani 40'; Comenencia 56', (yellow card) 57'; Guerra 62', 79'; Rouhi (yellow card) 90'		Mesík (yellow card) 12' (yellow-red card) 90+4'; Cangiano 20'; Di Pasquale (yellow card) 31'; Aloi (yellow card) 36'; Squizzato (yellow card) 51'; Cuppone 60'; Merola (yellow card) 86'; Tunjov 90+2' (pen.)	Stadium: Stadio Giuseppe Moccagatta; Referee: Filippo Giaccaglia

15 January 2024 21	Pescara	0–1	Perugia	Pescara
--:-- CET (UTC+1)				Stadium: Stadio Adriatico – Giovanni Cornacchia

21 January 2024 22	Arezzo	1–2	Pescara	Arezzo
--:-- CET (UTC+1)

27 January 2024 23	Pescara	3–0	Sestri Levante	Pescara
--:-- CET (UTC+1)				Stadium: Stadio Adriatico – Giovanni Cornacchia

3 February 2024 24	Pescara	2–0	Pineto	Pescara
--:-- CET (UTC+1)				Stadium: Stadio Adriatico – Giovanni Cornacchia

9 February 2024 25	Gubbio	4–0	Pescara	Gubbio
--:-- CET (UTC+1)

13 February 2024 26	Pescara	1–2	SPAL	Pescara
--:-- CET (UTC+1)				Stadium: Stadio Adriatico – Giovanni Cornacchia

18 February 2024 27	Vis Pesaro	4–0	Pescara	Pesaro
--:-- CET (UTC+1)

24 February 2024 28	Pescara	1–0	Lucchese	Pescara
--:-- CET (UTC+1)				Stadium: Stadio Adriatico – Giovanni Cornacchia

2 March 2024 29	Torres	4–1	Pescara	Sassari
--:-- CET (UTC+1)

5 March 2024 30	Recanatese	3–2	Pescara	Recanati
--:-- CET (UTC+1)

10 March 2024 31	Pescara	2–2	Carrarese	Pescara
--:-- CET (UTC+1)				Stadium: Stadio Adriatico – Giovanni Cornacchia

15 March 2024 32	Rimini	5–1	Pescara	Rimini
--:-- CET (UTC+1)

23 March 2024 33	Pescara	1–0	Pontedera	Pescara
--:-- CET (UTC+1)				Stadium: Stadio Adriatico – Giovanni Cornacchia

30 March 2024 34	Cesena	0–3	Pescara	Cesena
--:-- CET (UTC+1)

8 April 2024 35	Pescara	0–0	Virtus Entella	Pescara
--:-- CEST (UTC+2)				Stadium: Stadio Adriatico – Giovanni Cornacchia

14 April 2024 36	Olbia	0–3	Pescara	Olbia
--:-- CEST (UTC+2)

21 April 2024 37	Pescara	0–2	Ancona	Pescara
--:-- CEST (UTC+2)				Stadium: Stadio Adriatico – Giovanni Cornacchia

28 April 2024 38	Fermana	1–3	Pescara	Fermo
--:-- CEST (UTC+2)

==== Promotion play-offs ====
7 May 2024 First round	Pescara	2–2	Pontedera	Pescara
20:30 CEST (UTC+2)				Stadium: Stadio Adriatico – Giovanni Cornacchia; Referee: Antonino Costanza

Pescara advances as a higher-ranked team in regular season.

11 May 2024 Second leg	Pescara	1–3	Juventus Next Gen	Pescara
21:00 CEST (UTC+2)				Stadium: Stadio Adriatico – Giovanni Cornacchia; Referee: Michele Delrio

=== Coppa Italia Serie C ===
5 October 2023 First round	Pescara	6–1	Fermana	Pescara
20:45 CEST (UTC+2)				Stadium: Stadio Adriatico – Giovanni Cornacchia

9 November 2023 Second round	Pescara	1–0	Pineto	Pescara
18:30 CET (UTC+1)				Stadium: Stadio Adriatico – Giovanni Cornacchia

28 November 2023 Round of 16	Pescara	2–0	Latina	Pescara
18:00 CET (UTC+1)				Stadium: Stadio Adriatico – Giovanni Cornacchia

13 December 2023 Quarter-finals	Catania	2–0	Pescara	Catania
20:30 CET (UTC+1)	Castellini 67'; Zammarini 90+1'			Stadium: Stadio Angelo Massimino; Referee: Valerio Crezzini
