= Andrea Ferraris =

Italian footballer (born 2003)

Personal information
- Date of birth: 22 February 2003 (age 23)
- Place of birth: Turin, Italy
- Height: 1.73 m (5 ft 8 in)
- Position: Winger

Team information
- Current team: Pescara

Youth career
- –2011: Sporting Rosta
- 2011–2022: Juventus
- 2020–2021: → AC Milan (loan)
- 2021–2022: → Monza (loan)
- 2022–2024: Monza

Senior career*
Years	Team	Apps	(Gls)
2024	Monza	1	(0)
2024–	Pescara	36	(10)
2025–2026	→ Salernitana (loan)	30	(4)
- * Club domestic league appearances and goals as of 1 May 2026

Andrea Ferraris (born 22 February 2003) is an Italian professional footballer who plays as a winger for Serie C Group B club Pescara.

== Career ==
=== Youth ===
Ferraris began his youth career at Sporting Rosta before joining Juventus' youth sector at the age of eight. After nine years with Juventus, Ferraris was loaned out to AC Milan for the 2020–21 season, where he scored three goals and made two assists in 20 games for the under-18 squad.

In the summer of 2021, Ferraris was loaned out once again, this time to Monza for the 2021–22 Campionato Primavera 2 (under-19). During this season, he scored 14 goals and made four assists in 27 games, which led to him signing his first professional contract with Monza in July 2022. In the 2022–23 Campionato Primavera 2, Ferraris was crowned top goalscorer with 20 goals and three assists, playing a pivotal role in helping Monza gain promotion to the Campionato Primavera 1, the main Italian youth championship.

In the 2023–24 season, playing in the Campionato Primavera 1, Ferraris scored 13 goals and made three assists in 27 games, serving as Monza's captain and helping the team avoid relegation. Ferraris played 83 games, scoring 50 goals for Monza's youth teams.

=== Monza ===
Ferraris received his first senior call-up by Monza ahead of their Coppa Italia game against Udinese on 19 October 2022. He made his senior debut for Monza on 25 May 2024, coming on as an 81st-minute substitute against Juventus in the last matchday of the 2023–24 Serie A, which his team lost 2–0.

=== Pescara ===
On 12 July 2024, Ferraris moved to Serie C side Pescara on a permanent deal. With 12 goals during the 2024–25 season, Ferraris was Pescara's seasonal top scorer and helped the team to promotion to the Serie B.

=== Salernitana ===
On 1 September 2025, Ferraris joined Serie C club Salernitana on a one-year loan with a conditional obbligation for purchase at the end of the term.

== Style of play ==
Ferraris is a winger who can also play as a second striker or attacking midfielder. While not physically strong, his main characteristics are his technique and attacking-mindedness.

== Career statistics ==
As of match played 27 May 2026

Appearances and goals by club, season and competition
Club	Season	League			Coppa Italia		Other		Total	
Club	Season	Division	Apps	Goals	Apps	Goals	Apps	Goals	Apps	Goals
Monza	2023–24	Serie A	1	0	0	0	—		1	0
Pescara	2024–25	Serie C	35	10	—		9 (Note: One appearance in Coppa Italia Serie C; eight appearances, two goals in Serie C promotion play-offs)	2	44	12
Pescara	2025–26	Serie B	1	0	1	0	—		2	0
Pescara	Total		36	10	1	0	9	2	46	12
Salernitana (loan)	2025–26	Serie C	30	4	—		6 (Note: Appearances in Serie C promotion play-offs)	1	36	5
Career total			67	14	1	0	15	3	83	17
