= Pellacani =

Pellacani is a surname. Notable people with the surname include:

- Lucio Pellacani (born 1947),

Italian University Professor

- Chiara Pellacani (born 2002), Italian diver
- Filippo Pellacani (born 1998), Italian footballer
