= 2024–25 Delfino Pescara 1936 season =

Delfino Pescara 1936
2024–25 season
- Manager: Silvio Baldini
- Stadium: Stadio Adriatico – Giovanni Cornacchia
- Serie C Group B: 3rd
- Coppa Italia Serie C: First round
- All statistics correct as of 5 January 2025.

The 2024–25 season is the 89th in the history of Delfino Pescara 1936 and the fourth consecutive season in Serie C. Additionally, they competed in the Coppa Italia Serie C.

== Transfers ==
=== In ===
Pos.	Player	Transferred from	Fee	Date	Source
MF	(Italy) Gaetano Letizia	(Italy) Feralpisalò	Loan	9 January 2025	

== Pre-season and friendlies ==
25 July 2024 Friendly	Pescara	5–0	Folgore Delfino Curi Pescara	Palena
18:00				Stadium: Stadio gli Angeli

28 July 2024 Friendly	Pescara	v	Altamura	Palena
18:00				Stadium: Stadio gli Angeli
Note: The match was cancelled.

1 August 2024 Friendly	Pescara	2–0	Angolana	Silvi Marina
17:30				Stadium: Stadio Ughetto Di Febo

== Competitions ==
=== Overall record ===
Competition	First match	Last match	Starting round	Record							
Competition	First match	Last match	Starting round	Pld	W	D	L	GF	GA	GD	Win %
Serie C Group B	23 August 2024	27 April 2025	Matchday 1	21	12	5	4	27	16	+11	57.14
Coppa Italia Serie C				0	0	0	0	0	0	+0	—
Total				21	12	5	4	27	16	+11	57.14

Last updated: 5 January 2025
Source: Competitions

=== Serie C ===
==== League table ====
Pos	Team	Pld	W	D	L	GF	GA	GD	Pts	Qualification
2	Ternana (Note: 2 points deducted due to financial administrative irregularities.)	38	22	10	6	64	23	+41	74	National play-offs 2nd round
3	Torres	38	19	11	8	55	36	+19	68	National play-offs 1st round
4	Pescara (O, P)	38	19	10	9	55	35	+20	67	Group play-offs 2nd round
5	Arezzo	38	18	8	12	47	37	+10	62	Group play-offs 1st round
6	Vis Pesaro	38	15	13	10	44	34	+10	58	Group play-offs 1st round

Source: Lega Pro, Soccerway (in English)
Rules for classification: 1) Points; 2) Head-to-head points; 3) Head-to-head goal difference; 4) Goal difference; 5) Goals scored; 6) Lower goals against; 7) Wins; 8) Lower losses; 9) Away wins; 10) Lower home losses.
(Note: Head-to-head record is used only after all the matches between the teams in question have been played)
(O) Play-off winners; (P) Promoted

==== Results by round ====
Round	1	2	3	4	5	6	7	8	9	10	11	12	13	14	15	16	17	18	19	20	21
Ground	A	H	A	H	H	A	H	A	H	A	A	H	A	H	A	H	A	H	A	H	A
Result	W	D	W	W	D	W	W	W	W	W	W	W	L	W	D	L	W	L	D	D	L
Position																					

Updated to match(es) played on 5 January 2025. Source:
A = Away; H = Home; W = Win; D = Draw; L = Loss

==== Matches ====
The league schedule was released on 15 July.

23 August 2024 1	Ternana	1–2	Pescara	Terni

1 September 2024 2	Pescara	2–2	Torres	Pescara
				Stadium: Stadio Adriatico – Giovanni Cornacchia

7 September 2024 3	Rimini	0–1	Pescara	Rimini

16 September 2024 4	Pescara	2–1	Pianese	Pescara
				Stadium: Stadio Adriatico – Giovanni Cornacchia

23 September 2024 5	Pescara	0–0	Perugia	Pescara
				Stadium: Stadio Adriatico – Giovanni Cornacchia

26 September 2024 6	Virtus Entella	0–1	Pescara

30 September 2024 7	Pescara	2–1	Carpi	Pescara
				Stadium: Stadio Adriatico – Giovanni Cornacchia

6 October 2024 8	Ascoli	1–2	Pescara

18 October 2024 10	SPAL	0–1	Pescara	Ferrara

27 October 2024 11	Lucchese	1–3	Pescara

30 October 2024 12	Pescara	2–1	Pontedera	Pescara
				Stadium: Stadio Adriatico – Giovanni Cornacchia

3 November 2024 13	Vis Pesaro	1–0	Pescara

9 November 2024 14	Pescara	1–0	Sestri Levante	Pescara
				Stadium: Stadio Adriatico – Giovanni Cornacchia

17 November 2024 15	Arezzo	0–0	Pescara

21 November 2024 9	Pescara	4–1	Milan Futuro	Pescara
				Stadium: Stadio Adriatico – Giovanni Cornacchia
Note: The match originally scheduled for October 12 was postponed at the request of Milan Futuro due to numerous absences caused by national team call-ups.

25 November 2024 16	Pescara	0–1	Pineto	Pescara
				Stadium: Stadio Adriatico – Giovanni Cornacchia

30 November 2024 17	Gubbio	1–2	Pescara

7 December 2024 18	Pescara	0–1	Legnago Salus	Pescara
				Stadium: Stadio Adriatico – Giovanni Cornacchia

14 December 2024 19	Campobasso	2–2	Pescara

22 December 2024 20	Pescara	0–0	Ternana	Pescara
15:00				Stadium: Stadio Adriatico – Giovanni Cornacchia

5 January 2025 21	Torres	1–0	Pescara

=== Coppa Italia Serie C ===
11 August 2024 First round	Pescara	0–2	Pineto	Pescara
				Stadium: Stadio Adriatico – Giovanni Cornacchia
