= Federico Varano =

Italian footballer

Personal information
- Date of birth: 31 January 1995 (age 31)
- Place of birth: Vigevano, Italy
- Height: 1.80 m (5 ft 11 in)
- Position: Forward

Youth career
- Atalanta

Senior career*
Years	Team	Apps	(Gls)
2014–2015	Atalanta	0	(0)
2014–2015	→ Venezia (loan)	27	(1)
2015–2018	Cesena	0	(0)
2016	→ Arezzo (loan)	8	(0)
2016–2017	→ Pistoiese (loan)	16	(2)
2017–2018	→ Fano (loan)	21	(0)
2018–2019	Mantova	13	(1)
2019–2020	Chieri	23	(6)
2020–2021	Union San Giorgio	24	(4)
2021–2022	Sangiuliano City	15	(0)
2022	Cjarlins Muzane	13	(3)
2022	Sona	10	(1)
2022–2023	Chieri	19	(1)

International career
2011	Italy U17	3	(0)
2013	Italy U18	1	(0)
- * Club domestic league appearances and goals as of 19:59, 30 October 2023 (UTC)

Federico Varano (born 31 January 1995) is an Italian professional footballer.

== Club career ==
=== Atalanta ===
Born in Vigevano, Lombardy, Varano started his career at Lombard club Atalanta. He was part of the squad for the play-off round of 2013–14 Campionato Nazionale Primavera. On 16 July 2014 Varano graduated from their youth system and joined Serie C club Venezia, along with Simone Magnaghi.

=== Cesena ===
In July 2015, Cesena signed Federico Varano and Moussa Koné from Atalanta for a total transfer fee of €6 million, as part of a cashless swap which Luca Valzania moved to Atalanta from Cesena also for €6M fee on 30 June. Cesena also signed Mattia Caldara and Salvatore Molina on temporary basis from Atalanta as part of the deal. Varano signed a four-year contract. He was assigned number 20 shirt.

Varano failed to enter the first team lineup in the first half of 2015–16 Serie B season. On 29 January 2016 he moved to Serie C club Arezzo. On 20 July 2016, Varano left for another Serie C club Pistoiese.

On 12 July 2017 Varano returned to Cesena for their 2017 pre-season camp.

=== Mantova ===
On 29 November 2018, he joined Serie D club Mantova.

== Career statistics ==
As of match played 28 December 2017

Appearances and goals by club, season and competition
Club	Season	League			Coppa Italia		Other		Total	
Club	Season	Division	Apps	Goals	Apps	Goals	Apps	Goals	Apps	Goals
Venezia (loan)	2014–15	Lega Pro	27	1	2	0	0	0	29	1
Cesena	2015–16	Serie B	0	0	0	0	0	0	0	0
Arezzo (loan)	2015–16	Lega Pro	8	0	0	0	0	0	8	0
Pistoiese 1921 (loan)	2016–17	Lega Pro	16	2	0	0	0	0	16	2
Fano 1906 (loan)	2017–18	Serie C	15	0	0	0	0	0	15	0
Career total			66	3	2	0	0	0	68	3
