= 2025–26 US Salernitana 1919 season =

US Salernitana 1919
2025–26 season
- Manager: Giuseppe Raffaele
- Stadium: Stadio Arechi
- Serie C Group C: 1st
- Coppa Italia Serie C: First round
- Top goalscorer: League: Roberto Inglese (2); All: Roberto Inglese (3)

The 2025–26 season is the 107th in the history of Unione Sportiva Salernitana 1919 and the club's first season in Serie C since 2015, following relegation. In addition to the domestic league, Salernitana competed in the Coppa Italia Serie C. The season began on 17 August 2025.

== Squad ==
=== Transfers In ===
Pos.	Player	Transferred from	Fee	Date	Source
DF	(Croatia) Domagoj Bradarić	(Italy) Hellas Verona	Loan return	30 June 2025	
MF	(Poland) Mateusz Łęgowski	(Switzerland) Yverdon Sport FC	Loan return	30 June 2025	
DF	(France) Junior Sambia	(Italy) Empoli	Loan return	30 June 2025	
MF	(Italy) Antonio Pio Iervolino	(Malta) Żabbar St. Patrick	Loan return	30 June 2025	
MF	(Italy) Giulio Maggiore	(Italy) Bari	Loan return	30 June 2025	
DF	(Austria) Flavius Daniliuc	(Italy) Hellas Verona	Loan return	30 June 2025	
MF	(Italy) Nicola Dalmonte	(Italy) Catania	Loan return	30 June 2025	
DF	(Italy) Matteo Lovato	(Italy) Sassuolo	Loan return	30 June 2025	
MF	(Netherlands) Kees de Boer	(Italy) Ternana	Undisclosed	8 July 2025	
MF	(Morocco) Ismail Achik	(Italy) Bari	€100,000	11 July 2025	
MF	(Italy) Ivan Varone	(Italy) Ascoli	Undisclosed	11 July 2025	
MF	(Croatia) Borna Knezović	(Italy) Sassuolo	Loan	5 August 2025	
DF	(Germany) Marlon Ubani	(Italy) Lecce U20	Loan	5 August 2025	
DF	(Serbia) Vladimir Golemić	(Serbia) Mladost Lučani	Free	16 August 2025	
GK	(Italy) Federico Brancolini	(Italy) Empoli	Loan	19 August 2025	
MF	(Italy) Ettore Quirini	(Italy) Milan Futuro	Undisclosed	1 September 2025	
FW	(Italy) Andrea Ferraris	(Italy) Pescara	Loan	1 September 2025	
DF	(Italy) Paolo Frascatore	(Italy) Avellino	Undisclosed	1 September 2025	
MF	(Italy) Mattia Tascone	(Italy) Audace Cerignola	Undisclosed	1 September 2025	
GK	(Latvia) Leonards Čevers	Unattached		10 September 2025	

=== Transfers Out ===
Pos.	Player	Transferred to	Fee	Date	Source
FW	(Poland) Szymon Włodarczyk	(Austria) Sturm Graz	Loan return	30 June 2025	
DF	(Georgia (country)) Luka Lochoshvili	(Italy) Cremonese	Loan return	30 June 2025	
GK	(Denmark) Oliver Christensen	(Italy) Fiorentina	Loan return	30 June 2025	
MF	(Netherlands) Jayden Braaf	(Italy) Hellas Verona	Loan return	30 June 2025	
MF	(Colombia) Andrés Tello	(Italy) Catania	Loan return	30 June 2025	
DF	(Argentina) Juan Cruz Guasone	(Argentina) Estudiantes de La Plata	Loan return	30 June 2025	
DF	(Italy) Davide Gentile	(Italy) Fiorentina	Loan return	30 June 2025	
MF	(Italy) Federico Zuccon	(Italy) Atalanta U23	Loan return	30 June 2025	
MF	(Italy) Fabrizio Caligara	(Italy) Sassuolo	Loan return	30 June 2025	
MF	(Italy) Tommaso Corazza	(Italy) Bologna	Loan return	30 June 2025	
DF	(Slovenia) Petar Stojanović	(Italy) Empoli	Loan return	30 June 2025	
DF	(Italy) Fabio Andrea Ruggeri	(Italy) Lazio	Loan return	30 June 2025	
MF	(Cyprus) Grigoris Kastanos	(Italy) Hellas Verona	€1,200,000	1 July 2025	
FW	(Nigeria) Simy	(Saudi Arabia) Al-Orobah		1 July 2025	
MF	(Italy) Roberto Soriano			1 July 2025	
DF	(Tunisia) Dylan Bronn	(Switzerland) Servette	Free	2 July 2025	
DF	(France) Junior Sambia			11 July 2025	
DF	(Croatia) Domagoj Bradarić	(Italy) Hellas Verona	€750,000	3 August 2025	
MF	(Italy) Nicola Dalmonte	(Italy) Trento	Undisclosed	6 August 2025	
GK	(Italy) Francesco Corriere	(Italy) Gelbison	Loan	8 August 2025	
DF	(Italy) Matteo Lovato	(Italy) Empoli	Loan + fee	18 August 2025	
GK	(Italy) Luigi Sepe		Contract terminated	22 August 2025	
MF	(Italy) Giulio Maggiore	(Italy) Bari		1 September 2025	
DF	(Austria) Flavius Daniliuc	(Switzerland) Basel		1 September 2025	
DF	(Italy) Joshua Vuillermoz	(Italy) Giulianova Calcio	Loan	1 September 2025	
MF	(Poland) Mateusz Łęgowski	(Turkey) Eyüpspor	Contract terminated	1 September 2025	
MF	(Italy) Franco Tongya	(Turkey) Gençlerbirliği	Undisclosed	6 September 2025	

== Friendlies ==
20 July 2025	Salernitana	9–0	Alba Cittareale Alto Lazio	Cascia
		Report		Stadium: centro sportivo Country House Elite

24 July 2025	Salernitana	2–1	Giulianova	Cascia
17:30	Inglese 4' (pen.), 52'	Report	Esposito 20'	Stadium: centro sportivo Country House Elite; Attendance: 200; Referee: Catini

27 July 2025	Salernitana	2–0	Vis Pesaro	Cascia
	Achik 21'; Matino 31'	Report		Stadium: centro sportivo Country House Elite

10 August 2025	Salernitana	1–0	Reggina

== Competitions ==
=== Overall record ===
Competition	First match	Last match	Starting round	Final position	Record							
Competition	First match	Last match	Starting round	Final position	Pld	W	D	L	GF	GA	GD	Win %
Serie C	25 August 2025	26 April 2026	Matchday 1		5	5	0	0	8	3	+5	100.00
Coppa Italia Serie C	17 August 2025		First round	First round	1	0	1	0	1	1	+0	0.00
Total					6	5	1	0	9	4	+5	83.33

Last updated: 21 September 2025
Source: Competitions

=== Serie C ===
Group C

==== Results summary ====
Overall								Home						Away					
Pld	W	D	L	GF	GA	GD	Pts	W	D	L	GF	GA	GD	W	D	L	GF	GA	GD
5	5	0	0	8	3	+5	15	3	0	0	4	1	+3	2	0	0	4	2	+2

Last updated: 21 September 2025.

==== Results by round ====
Round	1	2	3	4	5
Ground	H	A	H	H	A
Result	W	W	W	W	W
Position	5	3	2	1	1

Updated to match(es) played on 21 September 2025. Source:
A = Away; H = Home; W = Win; D = Draw; L = Loss

==== Matches ====
The competition draw was held on 28 July 2025.

25 August 2025 1	Salernitana	1–0	Siracusa	Salerno
21:00 UTC+2	Knezović 35' (pen.)			Stadium: Stadio Arechi; Attendance: 0 Referee: Marco Di Loreto

31 August 2025 2	Cosenza	1–2	Salernitana	Cosenza
21:00 UTC+2	Mazzocchi 4'		Villa 12'; Inglese 71'	Stadium: Stadio San Vito-Gigi Marulla; Attendance: 810; Referee: Leonardo Mastrodomenico

14 September 2025 4	Salernitana	2–1	Sorrento	Salerno
20:30 UTC+2	Inglese 71'; Capomaggio 79'		Sabbatani 9'; Santini (penalty missed) 90+3'	Stadium: Stadio Arechi; Attendance: 12,444; Referee: Domenico Leone

17 September 2025 3	Salernitana	1–0	Atalanta U23	Salerno
20:00 UTC+2	Ferraris 60'			Stadium: Stadio Arechi; Referee: Valerio Pezzopane
Note: The match, originally scheduled for 7 September, was postponed due to the call-up of Atalanta Under-23 players to their respective national teams.

21 September 2025 5	Giugliano	1–2	Salernitana	Giugliano in Campania
17:30 UTC+2				Stadium: Stadio Alberto De Cristofaro; Referee: Luca De Angeli

=== Coppa Italia Serie C ===
17 August 2025 First round	Salernitana	1–1 (3–4 p)	Sorrento	Salerno
21:00	Inglese 83'		Russo 79'	Stadium: Stadio Arechi; Referee: Antonio Di Reda
