= Luigi Piccinato =

Italian architect (1899–1983)

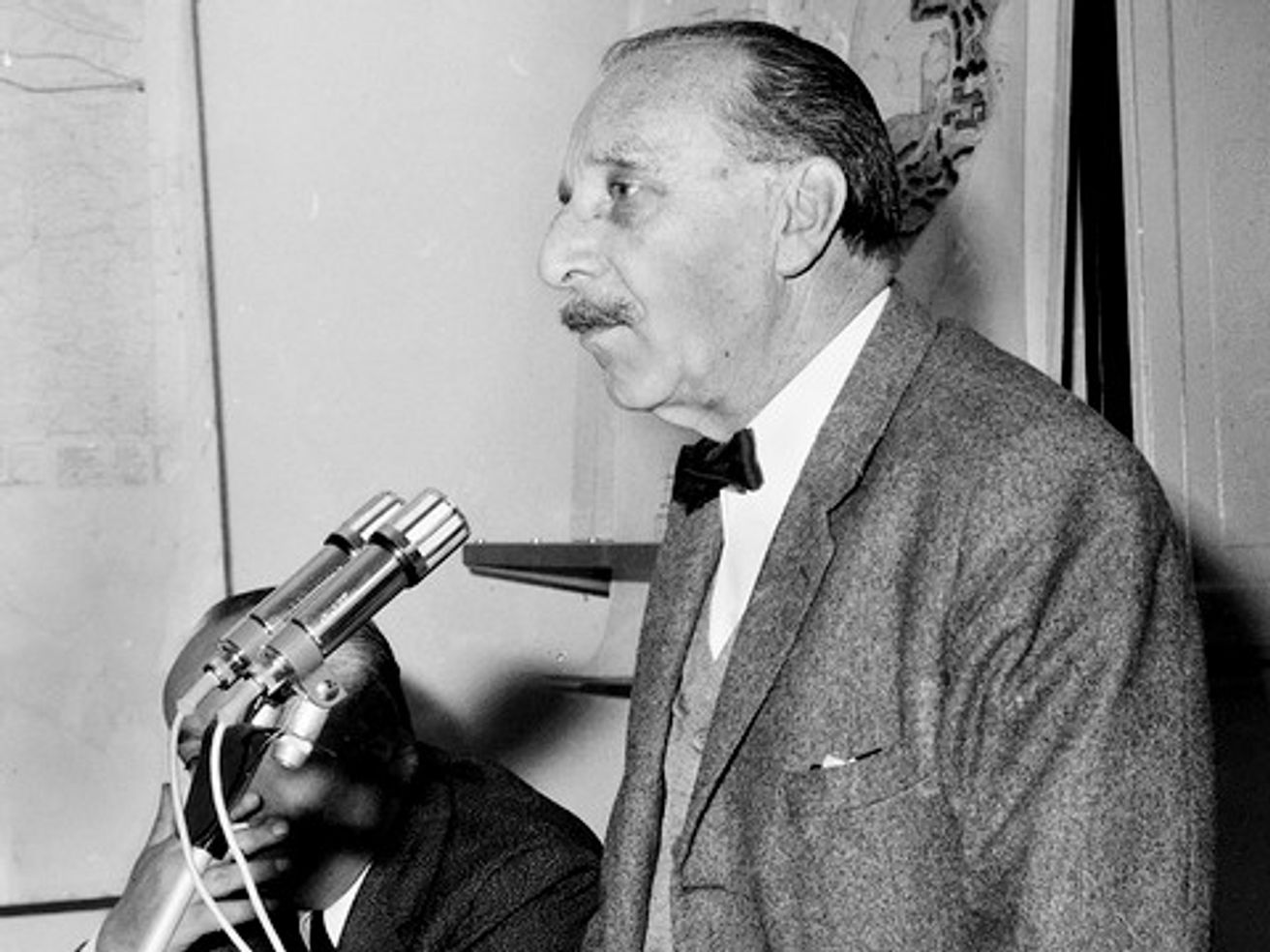
- Born: 30 October 1899; Legnago, Veneto, Italy
- Died: 29 July 1983 (aged 83); Rome, Lazio, Italy
- Occupation: Architect
- Buildings: Napoli Centrale railway station Stadio Adriatico

Luigi Piccinato (30 October 1899 – 29 July 1983) was an Italian architect and town planner.

== Works ==
- Urbanistica medioevale, Florence, 1943
- Napoli Centrale railway station, Naples, 1954
- Stadio Adriatico, Pescara, 1955
- A-Block Apartment Buildings in the First Section of Ataköy, Istanbul, 1957
- La strada come strumento di progettazione urbanistica, Rome, 1960

== Bibliography ==
- Cesare de Sessa, Luigi Piccinato, architetto, Dedalo libri, Bari 1985
- Federico Malusardi, Luigi Piccinato e l'urbanistica moderna, Officina, Roma 1993
- Elio Franzin, Luigi Piccinato e l'antiurbanistica a Padova 1927-1974 con alcuni scritti padovani di Luigi Piccinato, Ed. Il prato, Saonara (PD), 2005
- Luigi Piccinato: Il "Momento Urbanistico" alla Prima Mostra Nazionale dei Piani Regolatori, con 51 illustrazioni, in "Architettura e Arti Decorative" Anno IX, Fascicolo V e VI gennaio-febbraio 1930 Leggere l'articolo
- Luigi Piccinato (1899-1983) et Nikolaus Pevsner (1902-1983), in "Architettura, cronache e storia" vol. 29, no. 11 (337), 1983 Nov, p. 761
