= Moussa Koné (Ivorian footballer) =

Ivorian footballer

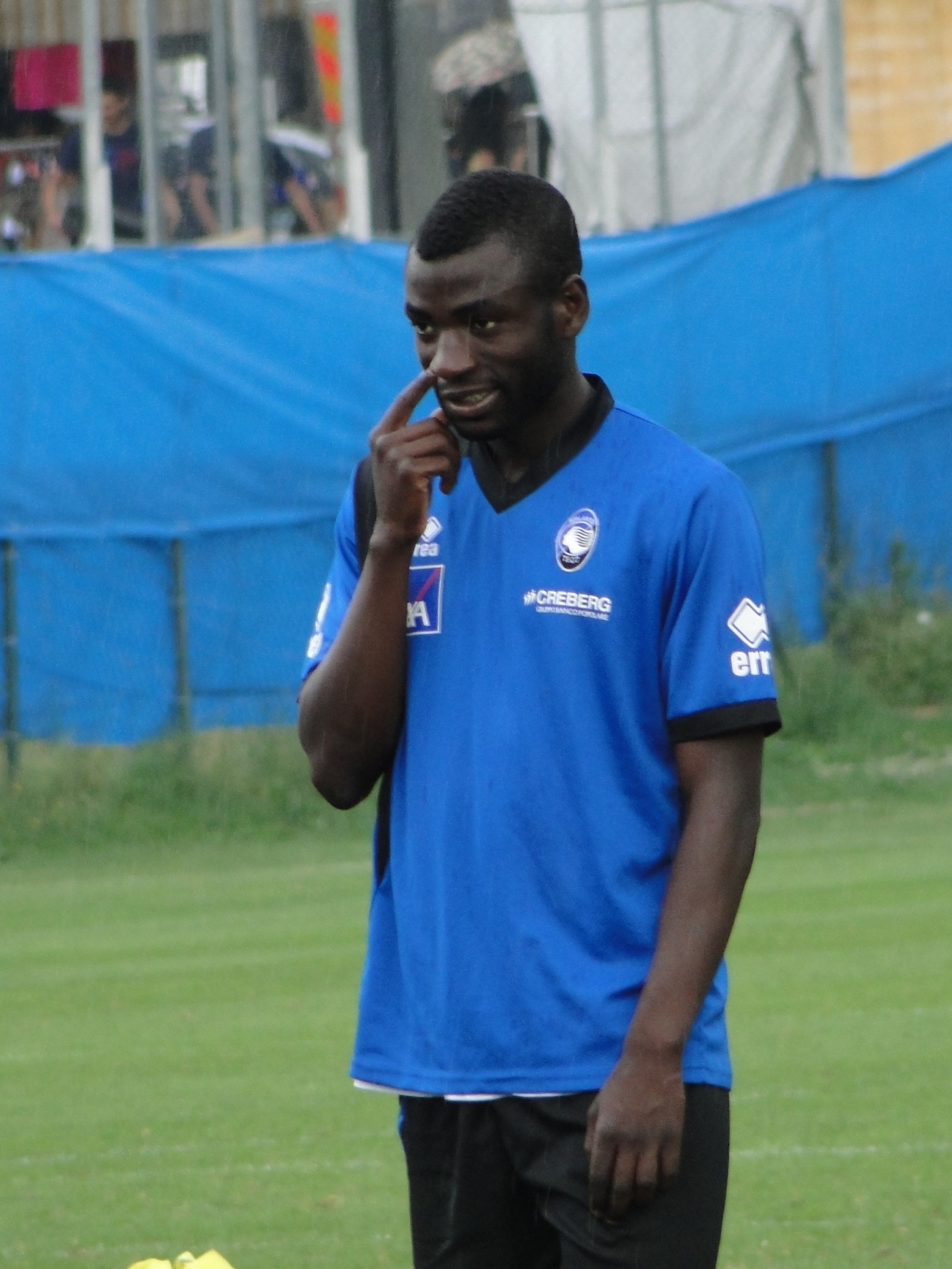

Personal information
- Full name: Moussa Saib Koné
- Date of birth: 12 February 1990 (age 36)
- Place of birth: Anyama, Ivory Coast
- Height: 1.80 m (5 ft 11 in)
- Position: Midfielder

Youth career
- Atalanta

Senior career*
Years	Team	Apps	(Gls)
2010–2015	Atalanta	8	(1)
2010–2011	→ Foggia (loan)	32	(4)
2011–2012	→ Pescara (loan)	30	(3)
2012–2013	→ Varese (loan)	31	(5)
2014–2015	→ Avellino (loan)	37	(2)
2015–2018	Cesena	82	(5)
2018	Frosinone	14	(0)
2018–2019	BB Erzurumspor	20	(0)
2020–2023	Kyzylzhar	51	(3)
Total		305	(23)

International career^{‡}
2011	Ivory Coast U23	3	(1)
2011	Ivory Coast	1	(1)
- * Club domestic league appearances and goals as of 13:41, 27 May 2023 (UTC) ‡ National team caps and goals as of 10 November 2012

Moussa Saib Koné (born 12 February 1990) is an Ivorian footballer who plays as a midfielder for FC Kyzylzhar.

== Career ==
=== Early career ===
Born in Anyama, Ivory Coast, Koné began to play football on his native country as a child, and impressed Italian clubs, like Inter, but signed with Atalanta, to play in the club youth categories.

=== Foggia (loan) ===
On 28 July 2010, Koné was loaned to Foggia for a season-long, to gain first-team experience. He made his debut for the club on 22 August, against Cavese. He made his first professional goal in the next round on 29 August, against Lucchese. At the end of the season, Koné made 32 appearances and scored 4 goals for Foggia.

=== Pescara (loan) ===
On 19 August 2011, Koné was loaned again, this time to Serie B club Pescara. He made his debut on 26 August 2011 coming off the bench to replace Marco Verratti in the 45th minute. On 1 November, he score his first goal for Pescara, against Varese.

=== Varese (loan) ===
On 30 August 2012, Koné made his third loan spell, to Serie B club Varese, as a loan exchange for Giuseppe De Luca. He made his debut on 1 September, against Virtus Lanciano, also getting on the scoresheet.

=== Cesena ===
On 10 July 2015 Koné and Federico Varano were signed by A.C. Cesena in definitive deals, with Luca Valzania moved to opposite direction.

== International career ==
Koné was called up to Ivory Coast national football team for a friendly match against Israel on 10 August 2011 and made his Les Éléphants debut coming off the bench to replace Yaya Touré in the 46th minute. 22 minutes later, he scored his first international goal.

Koné also played in 2011 CAF U-23 Championship, starting in Ivory Coast all matches, and scoring against Egypt.

=== International goals ===
No.	Date	Venue	Opponent	Score	Result	Competition	Ref.
1.	10 August 2011	Stade de Genève, Geneva, Switzerland	Israel	3–0	4–3	Friendly	

== Honours ==
=== Club ===
Pescara

Serie B: 2011–12
