= Federico Accornero =

Italian footballer (born 2004)

Personal information
- Date of birth: 5 February 2004 (age 22)
- Place of birth: Genoa, Italy
- Height: 1.70 m (5 ft 7 in)
- Position: Attacking midfielder

Team information
- Current team: Trento (on loan from Carrarese)
- Number: 11

Youth career
- U.S.D. Polis Genova
- Foce
- 2011–2023: Genoa

Senior career*
Years	Team	Apps	(Gls)
2023–2025	Genoa	2	(0)
2023–2024	→ Pescara (loan)	26	(3)
2025	→ Trento (loan)	16	(1)
2025–	Carrarese	2	(0)
2026–	→ Trento (loan)	1	(0)

International career^{‡}
2019	Italy U15	7	(2)
2019	Italy U16	7	(2)
2021–2022	Italy U18	12	(2)
2022–2023	Italy U19	4	(0)
2023	Italy U20	1	(0)
Medal record
Representing Italy
Mediterranean Games
Runner-up	Oran 2022	U-18 Team
- * Club domestic league appearances and goals as of 23 August 2026 ‡ National team caps and goals as of 13 October 2023

Federico Accornero (born 5 February 2004) is an Italian professional footballer who plays as an attacking midfielder for Serie C Group A club Trento, on loan from Carrarese.

== Club career ==
Born and raised in Genoa, Accornero started playing football at grassroots clubs Polis Genova and Foce, before joining Genoa's youth academy in 2011. He came through the club's youth ranks, reaching the final of the under-17 national championship in 2021, while starting to play for the under-19 squad in the same year.

On 6 March 2023, Accornero made his professional debut for Genoa, coming on as a substitute for Albert Guðmundsson in the 82nd minute of a 4–0 Serie B win against Cosenza. At the end of the campaign, he was involved in a double promotion, as Genoa's first team returned to Serie A after just one year, while the Primavera squad gained automatic promotion back to the Campionato Primavera 1.

On 27 July 2023, Accornero joined Serie C Group B club Pescara on a season-long loan. On 6 August, he scored his first professional goal in a 6–2 Coppa Italia defeat to Reggiana.

On 1 September 2024, Accornero made his Serie A debut for Genoa, as a late substitute in a 0–2 loss to Hellas Verona.

On 17 January 2025, Accornero was loaned by Trento in Serie C Group A.

On 16 July 2025, Accornero signed a three-season contract with Carrarese in Serie B.

== International career ==
Accornero has represented Italy at various youth international levels, having played for the under-15, under-16, under-18 and under-19 national teams.

He was included in the squad that took part in the 2022 Mediterranean Games in Oran, Algeria, where Italy eventually won the silver medal after losing to France in the final match.

== Style of play ==
Accornero started playing football as a central midfielder, before being moved to an attacking role. Despite operating mainly as a number 10, he can also play as an advanced forward or a left winger.

An ambidextrous forward, he is regarded by others for his agility, his dribbling ability and his work rate.

Although he was compared to Alexis Sánchez due to his characteristics, he cited Albert Guðmundsson and Mattia Aramu, two of his team-mates at Genoa, as his biggest sources of inspiration.

== Personal life ==
Accornero's parents own a seaside resort in Genoa.

He is a long-life supporter of Genoa.

== Career statistics ==
As of match played 19 July 2026

Appearances and goals by club, season and competition
Club	Season	League			Coppa Italia		Total	
Club	Season	Division	Apps	Goals	Apps	Goals	Apps	Goals
Genoa U19	2020–2021	Campionato Primavera 1	3	0	-		3	0
Genoa U19	2021–2022	Campionato Primavera 1	31	0	-		31	0
Genoa	2022–23	Serie B	1	0	2	2	3	2
Pescara	2023–24	Serie C	28	3	3	2	31	5
Genoa	2024–25	Serie A	3	0	-		3	0
Trento	2024–25	Serie C	17	1	-		17	1
Carrarese	2025–2026	Serie B	2	0	1	0	3	0
Career total			85	4	6	4	91	8
