= Simone Magnaghi =

Italian footballer

Personal information
- Date of birth: 12 October 1993 (age 33)
- Place of birth: Lovere, Italy
- Height: 1.88 m (6 ft 2 in)
- Position: Forward

Team information
- Current team: Sambenedettese
- Number: 93

Youth career
- Atalanta

Senior career*
Years	Team	Apps	(Gls)
2011–2016	Atalanta	0	(0)
2012	→ Tritium (loan)	5	(0)
2012–2013	→ Viareggio (loan)	30	(7)
2013–2014	→ Entella (loan)	10	(0)
2014	→ Prato (loan)	11	(1)
2014–2015	→ Venezia (loan)	34	(8)
2015–2016	→ Cremonese (loan)	16	(2)
2016–2017	Taranto	36	(4)
2017–2023	Pordenone	71	(11)
2019–2020	→ Teramo (loan)	29	(8)
2020–2021	→ Südtirol (loan)	29	(3)
2021–2022	→ Pontedera (loan)	37	(16)
2023–2025	Lucchese	57	(14)
2025–2026	Campobasso	35	(6)
2026–	Sambenedettese	5	(0)

International career
2009	Italy U16	3	(0)
2009	Italy U17	3	(3)
2011	Italy U18	3	(1)
- * Club domestic league appearances and goals as of 3 October 2026

Simone Magnaghi (born 12 October 1993) is an Italian footballer who plays as a forward for Serie C Group B club Sambenedettese.

== Career ==
After graduating in Atalanta's youth system, Magnaghi was loaned to Tritium, along with several teammates. In July 2012, he signed with Viareggio, also on loan. Magnaghi was the joint-top-scorer for Viareggio in the third division, along with Giuseppe Giovinco, with 7 goals. Among the whole group B of Lega Pro Prima Divisione, they were joint-16th. Magnaghi also played 9 times for the runner-up of 2012–13 Coppa Italia Lega Pro.; He was the joint-top-scorer in the tournament along with Stefano Scappini (both 5 goals).

In July 2013, he was again loaned out, this time to Virtus Entella, in a season-long deal. On 16 July 2014 Magnaghi joined Serie C club Venezia, along with Federico Varano. On 23 July 2015 he was signed by Cremonese.

On 12 August 2016 Magnaghi joined Taranto on a free transfer. In January 2017 he moved to Pordenone and won the Supercoppa di Serie C at the end of the 2018–19 season.

On 16 August 2019, he joined Teramo on loan with a purchase option. On 5 October 2020 he joined Südtirol on loan. On 12 July 2021, he was loaned to Pontedera.

After three seasons on loan, Magnaghi returned to Pordenone squad for the 2022–23 season.
