= Lorenzo Meazzi =

Italian footballer (born 2001)

Personal information
- Date of birth: 28 May 2001 (age 25)
- Place of birth: Genoa, Italy
- Height: 1.72 m (5 ft 8 in)
- Position: Midfielder

Team information
- Current team: Pescara
- Number: 7

Youth career
- –2021: Virtus Entella

Senior career*
Years	Team	Apps	(Gls)
2020–2024	Virtus Entella	59	(3)
2024–	Pescara	77	(10)
- * Club domestic league appearances and goals as of 13 May 2026

Lorenzo Meazzi (born 28 May 2001) is an Italian professional footballer who plays as a midfielder for Serie C Group B club Pescara.

== Career ==
Born in Genoa, Meazzi started his career in Virtus Entella youth sector. He was promoted to first team in 2020–21 season.

Meazzi made his professional debut in Serie B on 10 April 2021 against Salernitana as a late substitute.

On 1 February 2024, Meazzi moved to Pescara.
