= Roberto Pierno =

Italian footballer (born 2001)

Personal information
- Date of birth: 14 February 2001 (age 25)
- Place of birth: Bari, Italy
- Height: 1.80 m (5 ft 11 in)
- Position: Right midfielder

Team information
- Current team: Campobasso
- Number: 18

Youth career
- –2018: Bari
- 2018–2019: Lecce

Senior career*
Years	Team	Apps	(Gls)
2019–2023	Lecce	1	(0)
2020	→ Bitonto (loan)	8	(0)
2021	→ Catanzaro (loan)	7	(2)
2021–2023	→ Virtus Francavilla (loan)	67	(4)
2023–2025	Pescara	23	(1)
2024–2025	→ Campobasso (loan)	36	(2)
2025–	Campobasso	27	(1)
- * Club domestic league appearances and goals as of 30 April 2026

Roberto Pierno (born 14 February 2001) is an Italian professional footballer who plays as a right midfielder for Serie C Group B club Campobasso.

== Club career ==
He joined youth squad of Lecce in the summer of 2018 and started receiving call-ups to the senior squad in January 2019. On 4 January 2020, he was loaned to Serie D club Bitonto.

He made his Serie B debut for Lecce on 8 November 2020 in a game against Virtus Entella. He substituted Luca Paganini in the 89th minute.

On 1 February 2021 he joined Serie C club Catanzaro on loan.

On 21 July 2021, he was loaned to Virtus Francavilla, again in Serie C. The loan was renewed for the 2022–23 season.

On 15 July 2023, Pierno signed with Pescara.

On 16 July 2024 he joined Campobasso on loan with an obligation to buy.
