= Luca Valzania =

Italian footballer (born 1996)

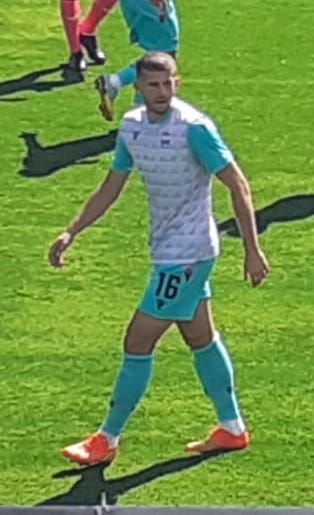
- Valzania with SPAL in 2022

Personal information
- Date of birth: 5 March 1996 (age 30)
- Place of birth: Cesena, Italy
- Height: 1.86 m (6 ft 1 in)
- Position: Midfielder

Team information
- Current team: Pescara
- Number: 14

Youth career
- –2013: Cesena

Senior career*
Years	Team	Apps	(Gls)
2013–2015	Cesena	3	(0)
2015–2022	Atalanta	2	(0)
2015–2016	→ Cesena (loan)	17	(0)
2016–2017	→ Cittadella (loan)	34	(1)
2017–2018	→ Pescara (loan)	33	(5)
2019	→ Frosinone (loan)	13	(2)
2019–2022	→ Cremonese (loan)	96	(8)
2022–2024	Cremonese	0	(0)
2022–2023	→ SPAL (loan)	21	(0)
2024	→ Ascoli (loan)	13	(0)
2024–	Pescara	70	(4)

International career^{‡}
2017–2019	Italy U21	11	(0)
- * Club domestic league appearances and goals as of 13 May 2026 ‡ National team caps and goals as of 25 March 2019

Luca Valzania (born 5 March 1996) is an Italian professional footballer who plays as a central midfielder for Serie C Group B club Pescara.

== Club career ==
=== Cesena ===
Valzania started his career at Cesena. On 13 May 2014 he made his professional debut for Cesena in Serie B as a substitute replacing Moro Alhassan in the 76th minute of a 1–0 home win over Empoli. At the end of 2013–14 season Cesena won the Serie B play-off and it was promoted in Serie A. On 6 January 2015, Valzania made his Serie A debut in a 4–1 home defeat against Napoli, he was replaced by Massimo Volta in the 79th minute.

=== Atalanta ===
On 30 June 2015, Valzania was sold to Atalanta for €6 million. That transfer window Cesena also signed Moussa Koné and Federico Varano from Atalanta, for a total transfer fee of €6 million.

==== Loan to Cesena ====
On 2 July 2015, Valzania was loaned back to Cesena on a season-long loan deal. On 9 August, Valzania made his debut for Cesena in a 4–0 home win over Lecce in the second round of Coppa Italia, he played the entire match. On 5 September he made his Serie B debut for Cesena in a 2–0 home win over Brescia, he was replaced by Luca Garritano in the 63rd minute. On 19 September he played his first entire match for Cesena, a 3–1 away win over Ascoli. On 1 December he played in the fourth round of Coppa Italia, a 4–1 away defeat against Torino. Valzania ended his loan to Cesena with 19 appearances and 1 assist.

==== Loan to Cittadella ====
On 15 July 2016, Valzania was loaned to Serie B club Cittadella on a season-long loan deal. On 7 August he made his debut for Cittadella as a substitute replacing Lucas Chiaretti in the 79th minute of a 2–1 home defeat, after extra-time, against Cremonese in the second round of Coppa Italia. On 27 August, Valzania made his Serie B debut for Cittadella in a 2–1 away win over Bari, he was replaced by Andrea Schenetti in the 77th minute. On 1 January 2017, Valzania played his first entire match for Cittadella, a 2–0 away win over Trapani. On 22 April he scored his first professional goal in the 66th minute of a 4–1 home win over Carpi. Valzania ended his season-long loan to Cittadella with 35 appearances, 1 goal and 5 assists.

==== Loan to Pescara ====
On 15 July 2017, Valzania left for Pescara on a season-long loan deal, with an option to buy at the end of season. On 12 August he made his debut for Pescara as a substitute replacing Christian Capone in the 59th minute of a 3–1 away win over Brescia in the third round of Coppa Italia. On 3 September, Valzania made his Serie B debut for Pescara as a substitute replacing Mamadou Coulibaly in the 65th minute of a 4–2 away defeat against Perugia. On 19 September he played his first entire match for Pescara, a 2–2 home draw against Virtus Entella. On 2 December, Valzania scored twice in a 3–3 home draw against Ternana. On 8 December he was sent off with a red card in the 90th minute of a 4–2 away defeat against Cesena. On 28 December, Valzania scored his third goal in the 86th minute of a 1–0 home win over Venezia. Valzania ended his loan to Pescara with 34 appearances, 5 goals and 4 assists.

==== Loan to Frosinone ====
On 8 January 2019, Valzania joined on loan to Frosinone until 30 June 2019. On 4 February he made his debut for the club in Serie A in a 1–0 home defeat against Lazio, he was replaced by Marcello Trotta after 81 minutes. On 17 March, Valzania scored his first goal for Frosinone, as a substitute, in the 70th minute of a 2–1 away defeat against Empoli. Two weeks later, on 31 March he played his first entire match for the club, a 1–0 home defeat against SPAL. Three days later, on 3 April, he scored his second goal in the 47th minute of a 3–2 home win over Parma. Valzania ended his season-long loan to Frosinone with 13 appearances, 2 goals and 1 assist, however Frosinone was relegated in Serie B.

=== Cremonese ===
On 31 August 2019, Valzania joined to Serie B side Cremonese on a season-long loan. On 15 September he made his debut for the club in a 4–1 away defeat against Pisa, he played the entire match. On 5 September 2020, he returned on loan at Cremonese until 30 June 2021. On 16 July 2021, he returned to Cremonese on a third loan. Cremonese held an obligation to purchase his rights in case of promotion to Serie A.

==== Loan to SPAL ====
On 31 August 2022, Valzania joined SPAL on loan until 30 June 2023.

==== Loan to Ascoli ====
On 5 January 2024, Valzania was loaned by Ascoli.

=== Return to Pescara ===
On 30 August 2024, Valzania returned to Pescara in Serie C.

== International career ==
On 10 October 2017 he made his debut with Italy U21 team as a substitute replacing Alessandro Murgia in the 82nd of a 4–0 home win over Marocco U-20 in an international friendly.

== Career statistics ==
=== Club ===
As of 31 August 2022

Club	Season	League			Cup		Europe		Other		Total	
Club	Season	League	Apps	Goals	Apps	Goals	Apps	Goals	Apps	Goals	Apps	Goals
Cesena	2013–14	Serie B	1	0	0	0	—		—		1	0
Cesena	2014–15	Serie A	2	0	1	0	—		—		3	0
Cesena (loan)	2015–16	Serie B	17	0	2	0	—		—		19	0
Cittadella (loan)	2016–17	Serie B	33	1	1	0	—		1 (Note: All appearance(s) in Serie B play-off.)	0	35	1
Pescara (loan)	2017–18	Serie B	33	5	1	0	—		—		34	5
Atalanta	2018–19	Serie A	2	0	0	0	2 (Note: All appearance(s) in UEFA Europa League qualification matches.)	0	—		4	0
Frosinone (loan)	2018–19	Serie A	13	2	0	0	—		—		13	2
Cremonese (loan)	2019–20	Serie B	31	2	2	0	—		—		33	2
Cremonese (loan)	2019–20	Serie B	37	5	0	0	—		—		37	5
Cremonese (loan)	2019–20	Serie B	28	1	1	0	—		—		29	1
Cremonese (loan)	Total		96	8	3	0	0	0	0	0	99	8
Career total			197	16	8	0	2	0	1	0	208	16
