= Antonio Di Nardo (footballer, born 1998) =

Italian footballer

Personal information
- Date of birth: 30 September 1998 (age 28)
- Place of birth: Naples, Italy
- Height: 1.83 m (6 ft 0 in)
- Position: Forward

Team information
- Current team: Juve Stabia
- Number: 9

Youth career
- Latina
- 2015–2016: Sampdoria

Senior career*
Years	Team	Apps	(Gls)
2016–2021	Sampdoria	0	(0)
2016–2017	→ Latina (loan)	6	(0)
2017–2018	→ Arezzo (loan)	30	(1)
2018–2019	→ Vis Pesaro (loan)	4	(0)
2019	→ Lucchese (loan)	11	(0)
2019–2020	→ Vis Pesaro (loan)	13	(0)
2020–2021	→ Arezzo (loan)	15	(0)
2021–2022	Sona	36	(12)
2022–2023	Vastese	31	(11)
2023–2025	Campobasso	72	(24)
2025–2026	Pescara	38	(14)
2026–	Juve Stabia	6	(5)
- * Club domestic league appearances and goals as of 29 August 2026

Antonio Di Nardo (born 30 September 1998) is an Italian footballer who plays as a forward for Serie B club Juve Stabia.

== Club career ==
Di Nardo started his career at Latina. In 2015 he was signed by Sampdoria for €1 million fee (net of VAT), on a 3-year contract. On the same day, Marco Marchionni moved in the opposite direction on a free transfer.

In the summer of 2016, Di Nardo returned to Latina and was assigned the number 6 shirt of the first team. He played 6 times during the 2016–17 Serie B season. He also played for the reserve team.

On 15 July 2017, Di Nardo and Criscuolo were signed by Arezzo on a temporary basis. On the same day, Arezzo youngster Riccardo Aramini joined Sampdoria outright.

On 25 January 2019, he joined Lucchese on loan until the end of the 2018–19 season.

On 3 September 2019 he was loaned to Vis Pesaro.

On 5 October 2020, he returned on his second loan to Arezzo.

On 20 September 2021, he signed with Sona Calcio in Serie D.

On 18 August 2025, Di Nardo joined Pescara, returning to Serie B after eight seasons in lower tiers.

On 27 August 2026, Di Nardo signed a three-year contract with Juve Stabia, remaining in the second tier after Pescara's relegation.
