= Gianmarco Cangiano =

Italian footballer (born 2001)

Personal information
- Date of birth: 16 November 2001 (age 24)
- Place of birth: Naples, Italy
- Height: 1.76 m (5 ft 9 in)
- Position: Left winger

Team information
- Current team: Pescara

Youth career
- –2010: Ragusa
- 2010–2019: Roma
- 2019–2020: Bologna

Senior career*
Years	Team	Apps	(Gls)
2020–2025	Bologna	3	(0)
2020–2021	→ Ascoli (loan)	25	(1)
2022	→ Crotone (loan)	7	(0)
2022–2023	→ Bari (loan)	6	(0)
2023	→ Fortuna Sittard (loan)	5	(0)
2023–2025	→ Pescara (loan)	70	(7)
2025–	Pescara	9	(0)
2026	→ Foggia (loan)	12	(1)

International career^{‡}
2018–2019	Italy U18	5	(1)
2019	Italy U19	6	(0)
2021–2022	Italy U20	8	(0)
- * Club domestic league appearances and goals as of 1 May 2026 ‡ National team caps and goals as of 28 March 2022

Gianmarco Cangiano (born 16 November 2001) is an Italian professional footballer who plays as a forward for Serie C Group B club Pescara.

== Club career ==
=== Early years ===
Cangiano was born in Naples, Italy, and started playing football for Sicilian club Ragusa as a youth player before being discovered by Bruno Conti who brought him to Roma's youth academy in 2010.

=== Bologna ===
Cangiano joined Bologna in July 2019, signing a five-year contract. The club paid a reported fee of €1.5 million plus bonuses, with Roma holding a 30% resell clause. He made his professional debut on 22 June 2020, coming on for Nicola Sansone in a 2–0 home loss to Juventus.

==== Loans ====
On 23 September 2020, he joined Serie B club Ascoli on loan. He made his debut for the club three days later, starting in a 1–1 away draw against Brescia. On 4 January 2021, Cangiano scored his first professional goal in a 2–1 Serie B victory against Reggina.

On 29 January 2022, he was loaned to Crotone until 30 June 2022.

On 15 July 2022, Cangiano joined Bari on loan. Having not found regular game time in Apulia, he was re-called on 11 January 2023 by Bologna and subsequently joined Eredivisie side Fortuna Sittard on another loan until the end of the season, with an option to buy and one to extend the deal for another year.

On 10 August 2023, he joined Serie C side Pescara on loan with an option to buy. One year later, on 2 August 2024, his loan was extended for another season, with the option to buy becoming an obligation if specific conditions were met, such as Pescara's promotion to Serie B. Pescara was promoted and the transfer became permanent.

== Club statistics ==
As of match played 6 October 2024

Appearances and goals by club, season and competition
Club	Season	League			National cup		Other		Total	
Club	Season	Division	Apps	Goals	Apps	Goals	Apps	Goals	Apps	Goals
Bologna	2019–20	Serie A	3	0	0	0	0	0	3	0
Ascoli (loan)	2020–21	Serie B	25	1	1	0	—		26	1
Crotone (loan)	2021–22	Serie B	7	0	0	0	—		7	0
Bari (loan)	2022–23	Serie B	6	0	2	0	—		8	0
Fortuna Sittard (loan)	2022–23	Eredivisie	5	0	—		—		5	0
Pescara (loan)	2023–24	Serie C	35	5	0	0	2 (Note: Appearances in Serie C promotion play-offs)	0	37	5
Pescara (loan)	2024–25	Serie C	8	1	0	0	—		8	1
Pescara (loan)	Total		43	6	0	0	2	0	45	6
Career total			89	7	3	0	2	0	94	7
