= Davide Merola =

Italian footballer (born 2000)

Personal information
- Full name: Davide Merola
- Date of birth: 27 March 2000 (age 26)
- Place of birth: Santa Maria Capua Vetere, Italy
- Height: 1.70 m (5 ft 7 in)
- Positions: Forward; winger

Team information
- Current team: Pescara
- Number: 10

Youth career
- 2005–2011: Juve Sammaritana
- 2011–2012: Capua
- 2012–2019: Inter Milan

Senior career*
Years	Team	Apps	(Gls)
2019–2024	Empoli	4	(0)
2020–2021	→ Arezzo (loan)	7	(0)
2021	→ Grosseto (loan)	13	(0)
2021–2022	→ Foggia (loan)	27	(9)
2022–2023	→ Cosenza (loan)	14	(1)
2023–2024	→ Pescara (loan)	50	(24)
2024–	Pescara	40	(10)

International career^{‡}
2015	Italy U15	8	(2)
2015–2016	Italy U16	9	(5)
2016–2017	Italy U17	17	(8)
2017–2019	Italy U18	12	(8)
2018–2019	Italy U19	13	(3)
- * Club domestic league appearances and goals as of 13 May 2026 ‡ National team caps and goals as of 20 July 2019

Davide Merola (born 27 March 2000) is an Italian professional footballer who plays as a forward or a winger for Serie C Group B club Pescara.

== Club career ==
He began playing football in 2005, at the age of five, for Juve Sammaritana. Later, he managed to get noticed by Capua by various observers from all over Italy. After having done several auditions, 2014 is bought by Inter. On 2 July 2017, he signed a youth registration contract to stay at Inter Milan until 2020. He debuted with Primavera on 10 September 2017 in a Campionato Primavera 1 against Udinese and marked the occasion by scoring a goal. With the Inter Milan youth sector he was twice the top scorer and also won the Supercoppa Primavera, Primavera Championship and Torneo Viareggio. On 11 March 2019, he was summoned to play in the first team and debuted three days later, on the occasion of the UEFA Europa League, against Eintracht Frankfurt.

On 20 August 2019 it was announced that Merola moved to Empoli.

On 4 October 2020, he was loaned to Arezzo. On 14 January 2021, he was sent on a new loan to Grosseto.

On 18 August 2022, Merola moved on loan to Serie B side Cosenza.

On 31 January 2023, Merola joined Serie C side Pescara on loan with a conditional obligation to buy. On 5 February, he scored a brace on his debut for the club, contributing to a 5–0 league win over Potenza.

== International career ==
With the Italy U17 team he took part in the 2017 UEFA European Under-17 Championship and with the Italy U19 team in took part in the 2019 UEFA European Under-19 Championship.

== Style of play ==
Merola has been described as a classic striker, operating mainly inside the penalty area. He is noted for his powerful and accurate shot, as well as his consistent goalscoring record throughout his career. Despite his relatively small stature and slender build, he is also known for scoring goals with his head, due to his timing and quick reactions. A technically proficient player, Merola is left-footed and has also shown ability in set-piece situations, including scoring from free kicks.

== Career statistics ==
=== Club ===
As of match played 6 October 2024

Appearances and goals by club, season, and competition
Club	Season	League			National cup		Europe		Other		Total	
Club	Season	Division	Apps	Goals	Apps	Goals	Apps	Goals	Apps	Goals	Apps	Goals
Inter Milan	2018–19	Serie A	0	0	0	0	1 (Note: Appearance(s) in UEFA Europa League)	0	—		1	0
Empoli	2019–20	Serie B	4	0	1	0	—		—		5	0
Empoli	2020–21	Serie B	0	0	1	2	—		—		1	2
Empoli	Total		4	0	2	2	0	0	0	0	6	2
Arezzo (loan)	2020–21	Serie C	7	0	—		—		—		7	0
Grosseto (loan)	2020–21	Serie C	13	0	—		—		2 (Note: Appearance(s) in Serie C promotion play-offs)	2	15	2
Foggia (loan)	2021–22	Serie C	27	9	1	1	—		4	1	32	11
Cosenza (loan)	2022–23	Serie B	14	1	0	0	—		—		14	1
Pescara (loan)	2022–23	Serie C	13	7	—		—		6	1	19	8
Pescara (loan)	2023–24	Serie C	37	17	4	1	—		2	0	43	18
Pescara	2024–25	Serie C	5	0	0	0	—		—		5	0
Pescara	Total		55	24	4	1	—		8	1	67	26
Career total			120	34	7	4	1	0	14	4	142	42

== Honours ==
=== Club ===
==== Inter Milan ====
- Supercoppa Primavera: 2017
- Campione Primavera: 2017
- Torneo di Viareggio: 2017

=== Individual ===
- Capocannoniere: 2016, 2017
