= Andrea Oliveri =

Italian footballer (born 2003)

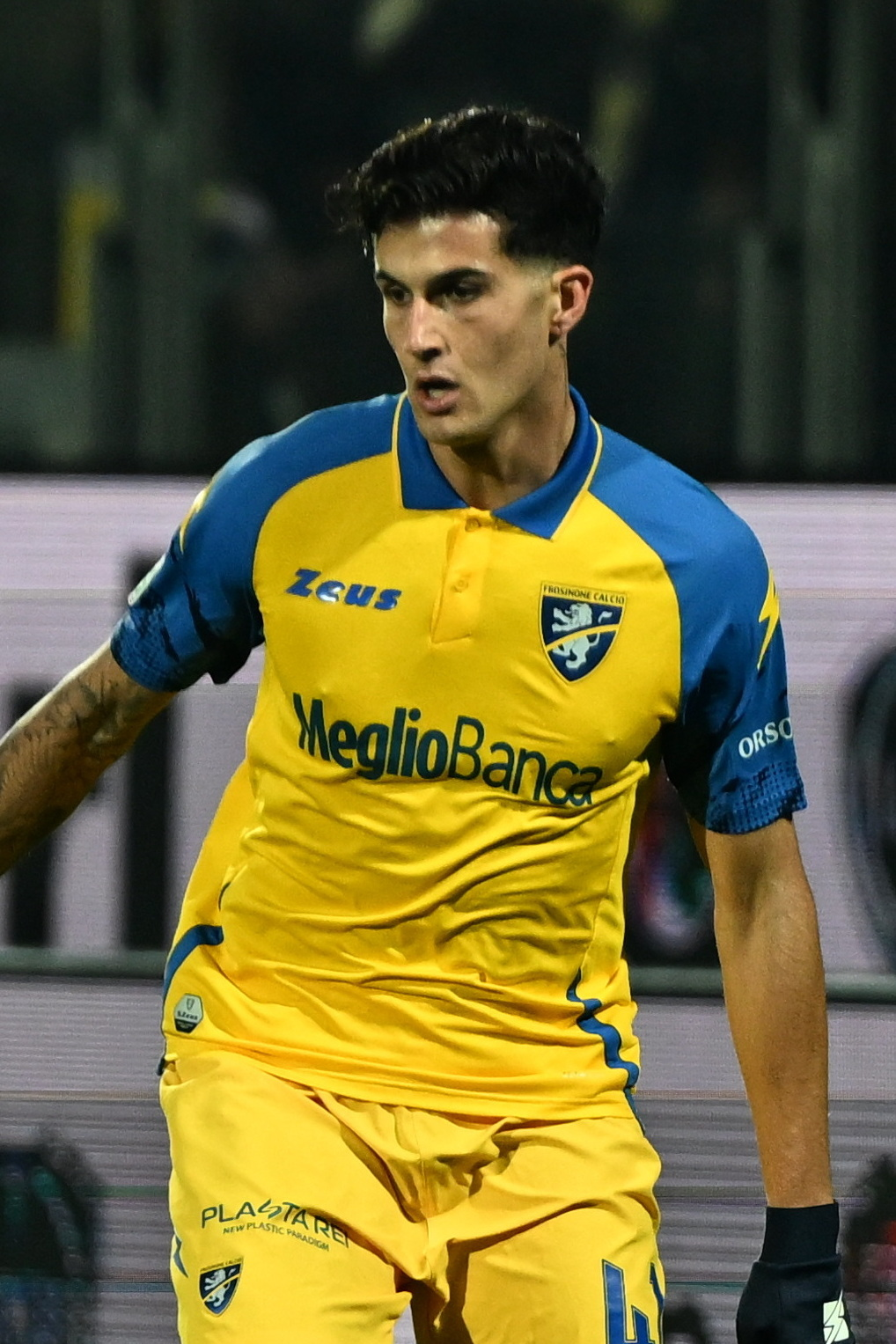
- Oliveri playing with Frosinone in 2022

Personal information
- Date of birth: 14 January 2003 (age 23)
- Place of birth: Palermo, Italy
- Height: 1.81 m (5 ft 11 in)
- Position: Right midfielder

Team information
- Current team: Ascoli (on loan from Atalanta)
- Number: 14

Youth career
- –2017: Palermo
- 2017–2022: Atalanta

Senior career*
Years	Team	Apps	(Gls)
2021–	Atalanta	0	(0)
2022–2023	→ Frosinone (loan)	8	(0)
2023–2024	→ Catanzaro (loan)	26	(1)
2024–2025	→ Bari (loan)	29	(0)
2025–2026	→ Pescara (loan)	15	(3)
2026–	→ Ascoli (loan)	0	(0)

International career^{‡}
2018	Italy U15	1	(0)
2018–2019	Italy U16	5	(0)
2019–2020	Italy U17	2	(0)
- * Club domestic league appearances and goals as of 13 May 2026 ‡ National team caps and goals as of 15 January 2020

Andrea Oliveri (Palermo 14 January 2003) is an Italian footballer who plays as a right midfielder for Serie B club Ascoli, on loan from Atalanta.

== Club career ==
Oliveri was first called up to the senior squad of Atalanta in October 2021.

On 11 August 2022, Oliveri joined Frosinone in Serie B on loan. He made his Serie B debut for Frosinone on 21 August 2022 in a game against Brescia.

On 13 July 2023, he joined Catanzaro on loan.

On 13 July 2024, Oliveri was loaned to Bari.

On 19 August 2025, Oliveri moved on a new Serie B loan to Pescara.

== International career ==
Oliveri was first called up to represent his country for Under-15 squad friendlies in February 2018. He was later called up to the Under-16 and Under-17 squads as well, also for friendlies.

== Career statistics ==
As of match played 13 May 2025

Appearances and goals by club, season and competition
Club	Season	League			Coppa Italia		Continental		Other		Total	
Club	Season	Division	Apps	Goals	Apps	Goals	Apps	Goals	Apps	Goals	Apps	Goals
Atalanta	2021-22	Serie A	0	0	0	0	0	0	—		0	0
Atalanta	2022-23	Serie A	0	0	0	0	0	0	—		0	0
Atalanta	2023-24	Serie A	0	0	0	0	0	0	—		0	0
Atalanta	2024-25	Serie A	0	0	0	0	0	0	—		0	0
Atalanta	Total		0	0	0	0	0	0	—		0	0
Frosinone (loan)	2022-23	Serie B	8	0	0	0	—		—		8	0
Catanzaro (loan)	2023-24	Serie B	26	1	1	0	—		3 (Note: Appearance(s) in Serie B Promotion play-offs)	0	30	1
Bari (loan)	2024-25	Serie B	29	0	1	0	—		—		30	0
Career total			63	1	2	0	0	0	3	0	68	1
