= Davide Di Pasquale =

Italian footballer (born 1996)

Personal information
- Date of birth: 27 January 1996 (age 30)
- Place of birth: Pescara, Italy
- Height: 1.81 m (5 ft 11 in)
- Position: Centre back

Team information
- Current team: Foggia
- Number: 6

Youth career
- Pescara

Senior career*
Years	Team	Apps	(Gls)
2015–2016	Pescara	0	(0)
2015	→ Giulianova (loan)	16	(1)
2015–2016	→ Campobasso (loan)	18	(2)
2016–2021	Sambenedettese	73	(3)
2021–2023	Foggia	41	(4)
2023–2024	Arezzo	0	(0)
2023–2024	→ Pescara (loan)	12	(2)
2024	Pescara	0	(0)
2024–2026	Crotone	63	(3)
2026–	Foggia	1	(0)
- * Club domestic league appearances and goals as of 24 August 2026

Davide Di Pasquale (born 27 January 1996) is an Italian professional footballer who plays as a centre-back for Serie C Group C club Foggia.

== Career ==
Born in Pescara, Di Pasquale started his career on local club Delfino Pescara. As a senior, he was loaned to Serie D clubs Giulianova and Campobasso.

On 29 July 2016, he left Pescara and signed with Serie C club Sambenedettese. In February 2019, he extended his contract still 2021. Di Pasquale played five Serie C seasons for the club.

On 31 August 2021, he moved to Foggia.

On 18 July 2023, Di Pasquale signed a two-year contract with Arezzo. On 1 September 2023, Di Pasquale returned to Pescara on loan with an obligation to buy.

On 18 July 2024, Di Pasquale joined Crotone on a three-year deal.
