= Matteo Dagasso =

Italian footballer (born 2004)

Personal information
- Date of birth: 1 April 2004 (age 22)
- Place of birth: Penne, Italy
- Height: 1.75 m (5 ft 9 in)
- Position: Midfielder

Team information
- Current team: Venezia
- Number: 28

Youth career
- Pescara

Senior career*
Years	Team	Apps	(Gls)
2023–2026	Pescara	92	(6)
2026–	Venezia	11	(2)

International career^{‡}
2025–	Italy U21	10	(2)
2026–	Italy	2	(0)
- * Club domestic league appearances and goals as of 23:28, 16 May 2026 (UTC) ‡ National team caps and goals as of 16 November 2026

Matteo Dagasso (born 1 April 2004) is an Italian professional footballer who plays as a midfielder for Serie A club Venezia and the Italy national team.

== Club career ==
A youth product of Pescara, Dagasso debuted with the senior team in a 1–0 Coppa Italia win over Reggiana on 6 August 2023. On 7 February 2024, he signed his first professional contract with the club until 2028. He was named Pescara's player of the season for 2024–25. On 21 August 2025, he extended his contract with Pescara until 2029. On 28 January 2026, he transferred to Venezia on a contract until 2030. He helped Venezia win the 2025–26 Serie B earning promotion, and was named one of the best U23 players in the league that season.

== International career ==
Dagasso is a youth international for Italy, having been called up to the Italy U21s in August 2025.

In May 2026, he was one of the players who were called up with the Italy national senior squad by interim head coach Silvio Baldini, for the friendly matches against Luxembourg and Greece on 3 and 7 June 2026, respectively.

== Career statistics ==
=== International ===
As of match played 7 June 2026

Appearances and goals by national team and year
National team	Year	Apps	Goals
Italy	2026	2	0
Total		2	0

== Honours ==
Venezia

- Serie B: 2025–26
