= Riccardo Brosco =

Italian footballer

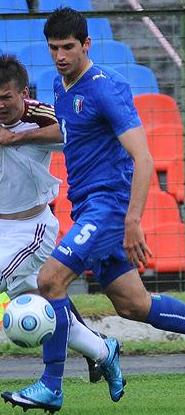
- Brosco playing for the Italy U-19 squad

Personal information
- Date of birth: 3 February 1991 (age 35)
- Place of birth: Rome, Italy
- Height: 1.90 m (6 ft 3 in)
- Position: Centre back

Team information
- Current team: Ostiamare

Youth career
- Roma

Senior career*
Years	Team	Apps	(Gls)
2009–2011	Triestina	30	(0)
2011–2013	Pescara	22	(0)
2012–2013	→ Ternana (loan)	22	(1)
2013–2017	Latina	123	(10)
2017–2018	Verona	0	(0)
2017	→ Latina (loan)	9	(0)
2017–2018	→ Carpi (loan)	27	(0)
2018–2021	Ascoli	93	(7)
2021–2022	Vicenza	26	(1)
2022–2026	Pescara	122	(7)
2026	Foggia	8	(1)
2026–	Ostiamare	0	(0)

International career
2007–2008	Italy U-17	10	(0)
2009–2010	Italy U-19	8	(0)
2010	Italy U-21	1	(0)
- * Club domestic league appearances and goals as of 1 May 2026

Riccardo Brosco (born 3 February 1991) is an Italian professional footballer who plays as a defender for Serie C club Ostiamare.

== Club career ==
Brosco is a product of the Roma youth system. His favoured position is at centre back but he is also able to score goals with his good heading ability. At the age of 17 he became a key member of Roma's U20 side that finished as runners-up in the U20 cup tournament. He has captained the youth side on many occasions.

Brosco was on Roma's bench in several games in the 2008–09 season.

=== Triestina ===
Brosco was loaned out to Serie B club Triestina on 5 August 2009 and got his senior debut in a Coppa Italia match on 16 August 2009. His league debut came five days later in a scoreless draw against Mantova. In June 2010 Triestina excised the option to sign him in co-ownership deal for €100,000. In June 2011 Triestina acquired the remain 50% registration rights for €500.

=== Pescara ===
In the summer of 2011, he was bought by Parma for €200,000, which decided to send him to Serie B club Pescara in another co-ownership deal for €100,000. On 10 September 2011, he made his debut with Pescara in the home match won 2–0 against Crotone.

He moved on loan to fellow Serie B club Ternana on 31 August 2012, along with Riccardo Maniero and Antonino Ragusa. In June 2013 Parma bought back Brosco for €500.

=== Latina ===
Brosco returned to Parma in June 2013. In July 2013 Brosco was signed by another Serie B club Latina in temporary deal, along with Alessandro Iacobucci. In June 2014 Latina did not excised the option to purchase both players; however on 10 July 2014 Brosco was signed by Latina in 4-year contract.

=== Verona ===
On 31 January 2017, he was sold to Verona. Verona loaned him back to Latina until the end of the 2016–17 season.

=== Ascoli ===
On 24 July 2018, Brosco signed with Ascoli.

=== Vicenza ===
On 20 July 2021, he signed a two-year contract with Vicenza.

=== Return to Pescara ===
On 30 August 2022, Brosco returned to Pescara, now in Serie C.

== International career ==
In August 2009, Brosco was called up for Italy's U-21 squad as a replacement for the injured Tuia. With the Italy U-19 squad he took part at the 2010 U-19 European Championship.

On 17 November 2010 he made his debut with the Italy U-21 team in a friendly match against Turkey.
