= Stadio Adriatico – Giovanni Cornacchia =

Stadium in Pescara, Italy

- Stadio Bianco-Azzurro
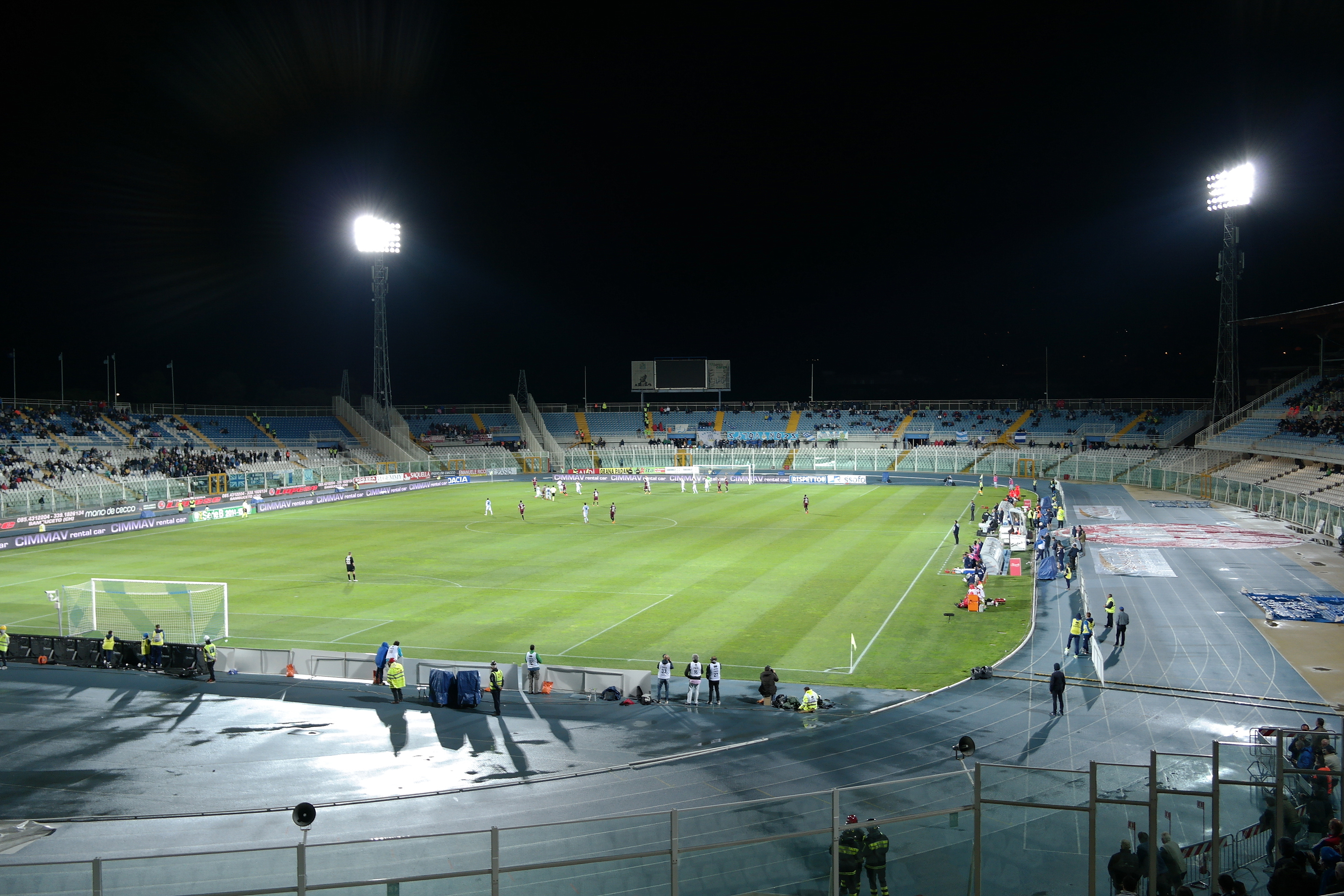
- Stadio Adriatico – Giovanni Cornacchia
- Interactive map of Stadio Adriatico – Giovanni Cornacchia
- Address: Viale Vittorio Pepe; Pescara; Italy
- Coordinates: 42.455°N 14.230°E
- Elevation: 1 m (3.3 ft)
- Owner: Comune of Pescara
- Capacity: 20,476
- Type: Stadium
- Event: Sporting events
- Surface: Grass
- Field size: 105 x 68 meters
- Field shape: Oval
- Public transit: Pescara Tribunale

Construction
- Groundbreaking: 30 December 1952
- Opened: 29 December 1955
- Renovated: 2009
- Architect: Luigi Piccinato

Tenants
- Delfino Pescara 1936 (1955–present); Italy national football team (select matches)

The Stadio Adriatico – Giovanni Cornacchia is a stadium in Pescara within the central region of Abruzzo in Italy. The venue opened in 1955 and was designed by the Italian architect Luigi Piccinato. It hosted some preliminary football games during the 1960 Summer Olympics. The stadium originated as a multipurpose athletic facility and a center for the Italian National Olympic Committee. The venue hosted several matches for the Italy national football team and was a reserve stadium for the 1990 FIFA World Cup. Today, the venue is used primarily for football and athletics, and is the home stadium of Serie C club Delfino Pescara 1936. The stadium, which completed renovations in 2009, was the main stadium of the 2009 Mediterranean Games.

== History ==
The oval stadium was designed by Luigi Piccinato, who was inspired by the style of the Roman Stadio Olimpico, which opened two years earlier. Architecturally, Piccinato notably used arches to support the bleachers of the Stadio Adriatico. Originally, the stadium had one-level stands and could only accommodate up to 10,000 spectators. After Delfino Pescara's first promotion to Serie A, the top division of Italian football, in 1977, the stadium was widened and expanded with the addition of a second level. The stadium capacity thus increased to 34,000. Prior to the Heysel Stadium disaster in 1985, when venue security and regulations were less strict, the stadium was able to hold up to 40,000 attendees.

In 2009, the stadium was renovated to better accommodate the 2009 Mediterranean Games, which Pescara hosted. After spending around €15,000,000, the venue capacity was set to 24,400 seats. Bleachers were covered with laminated wood, air-conditioned suites were added, as well as a new press box and modernized elevators.

On 22 October 2009, the stadium was renamed to honour Giovanni Cornacchia, an Olympic hurdler and native of Pescara.

== Gallery ==
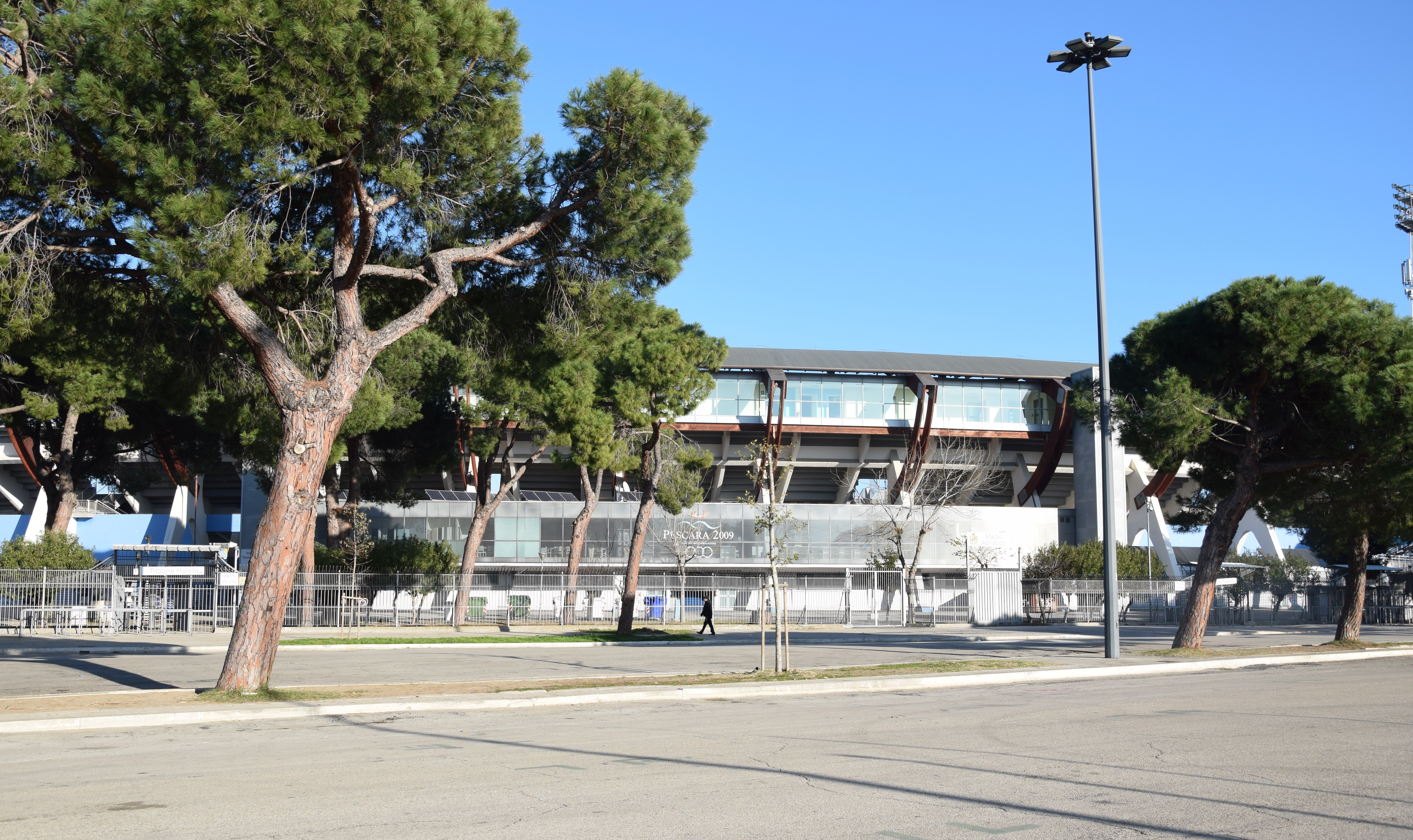
Exterior view of the stadium in 2020.

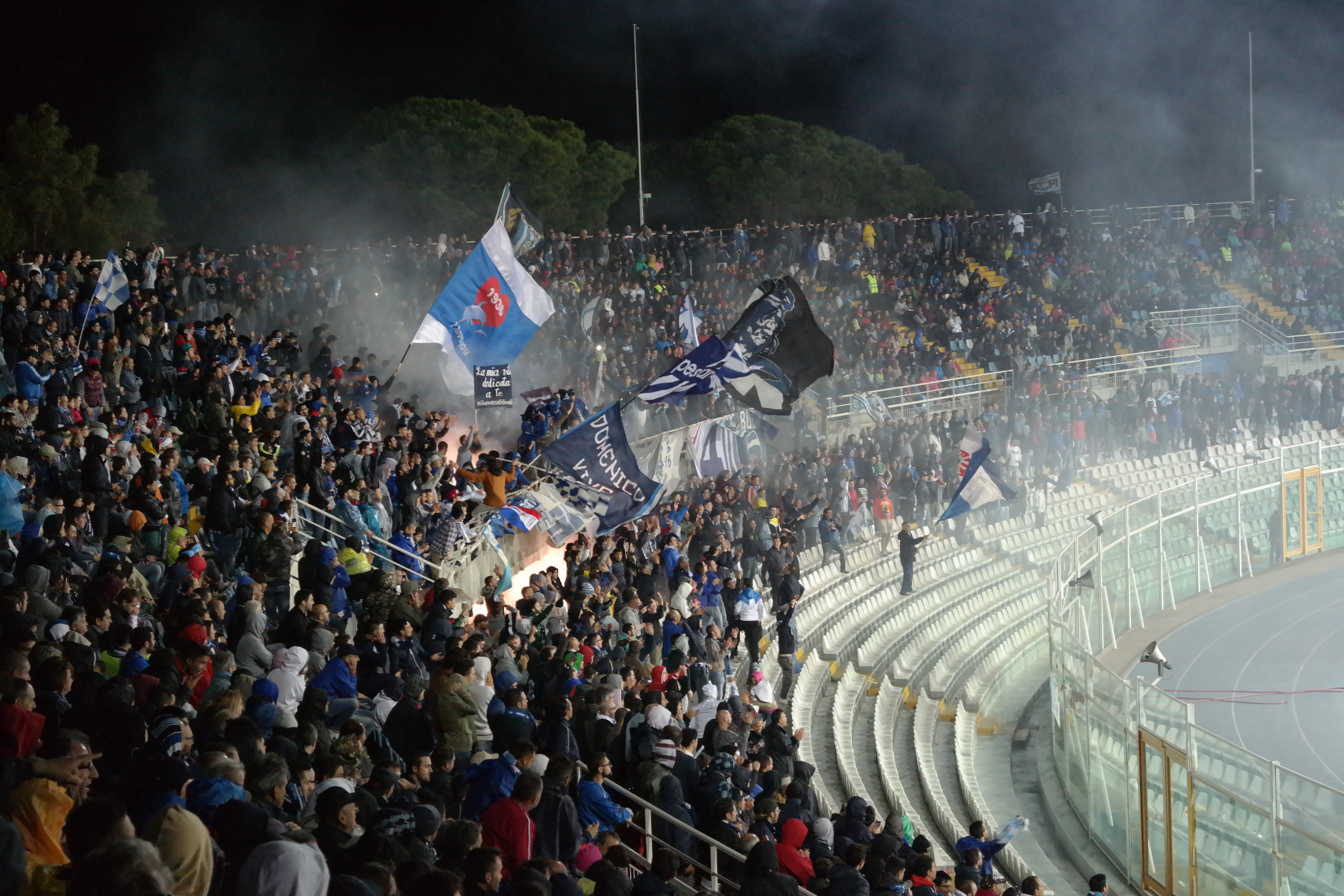
View of the Curva Nord in 2015.

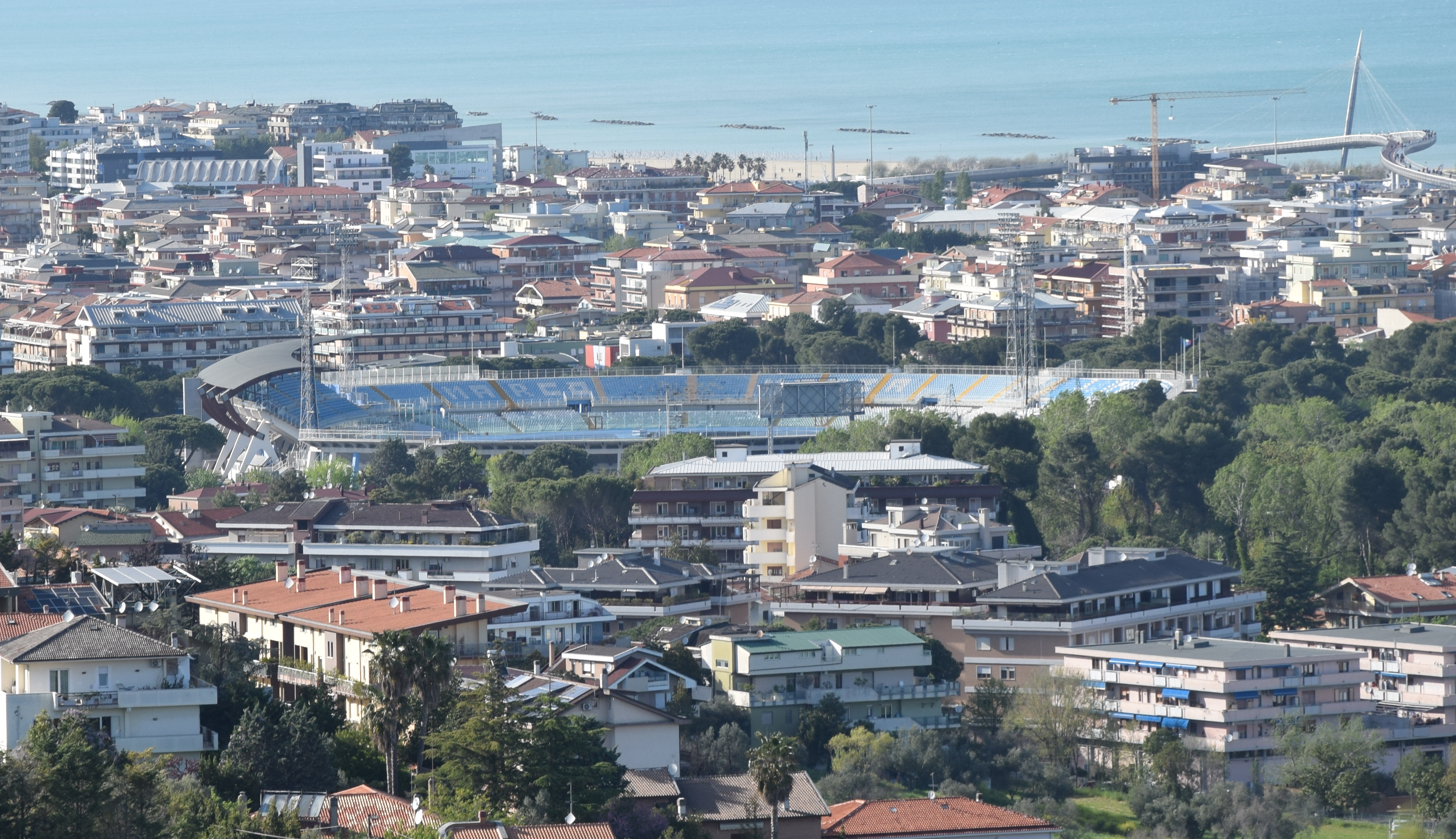
Panoramic view of the stadium in 2022.

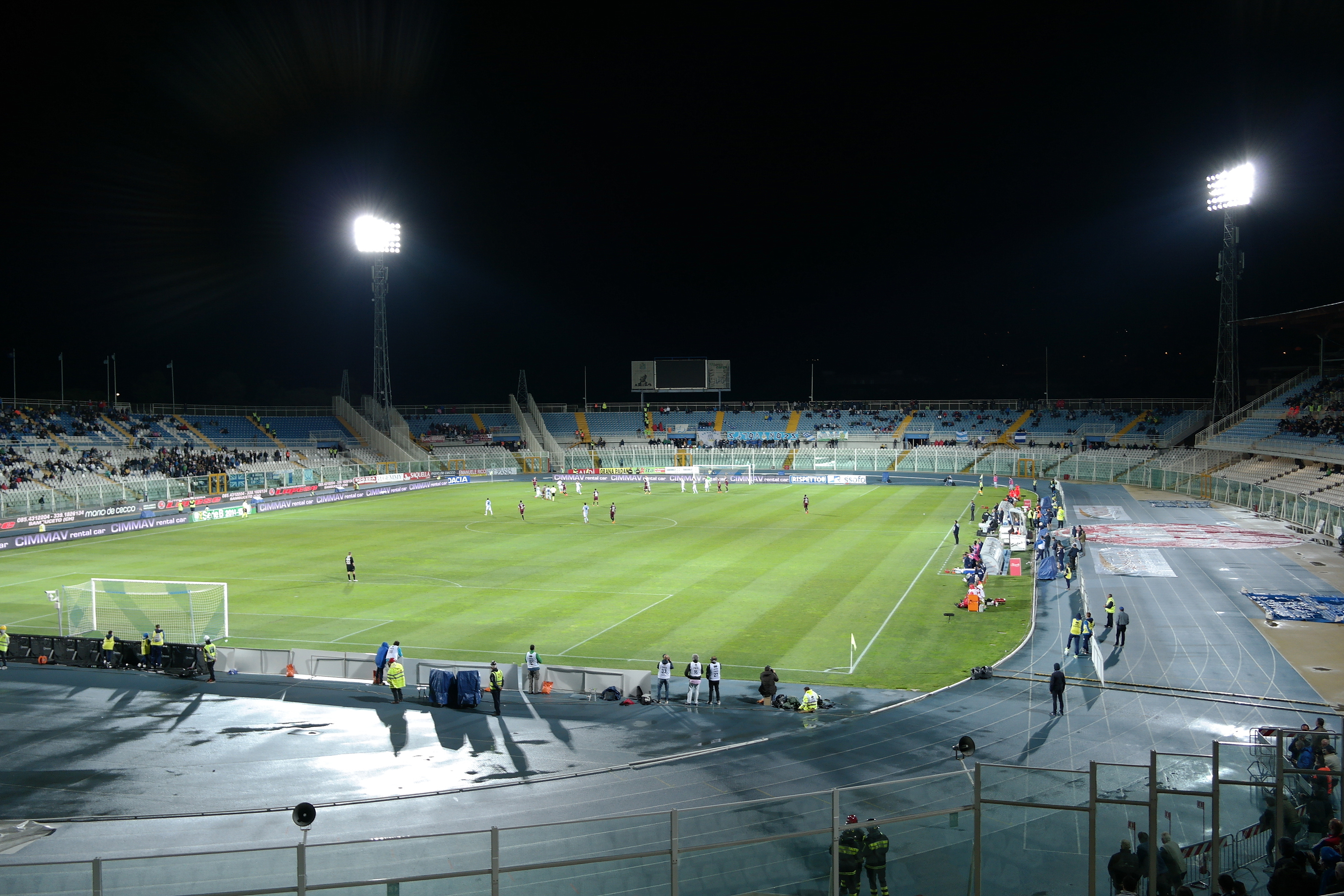
Interior view of the stadium in 2015.

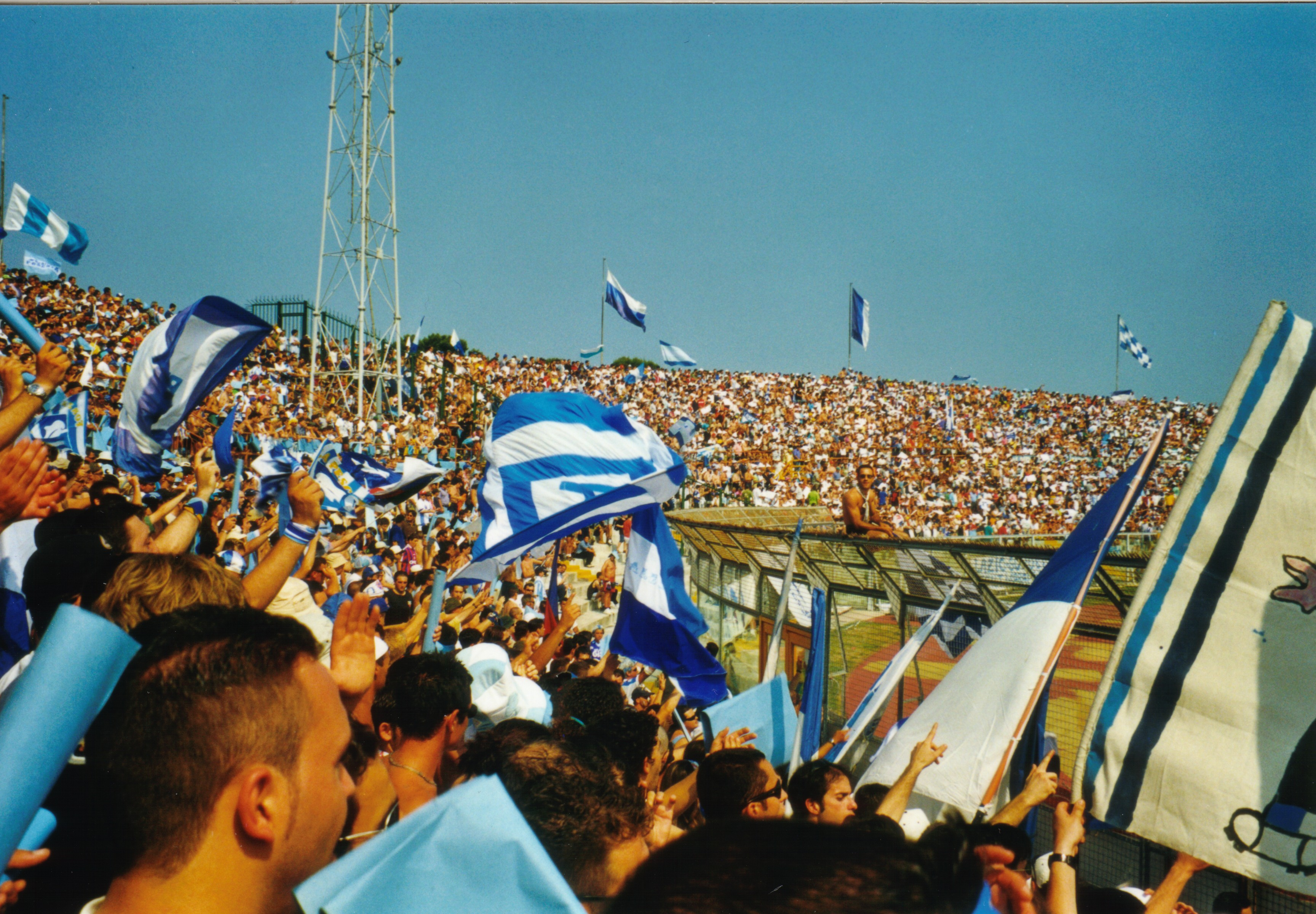
View of the Curva Nord in 1999.

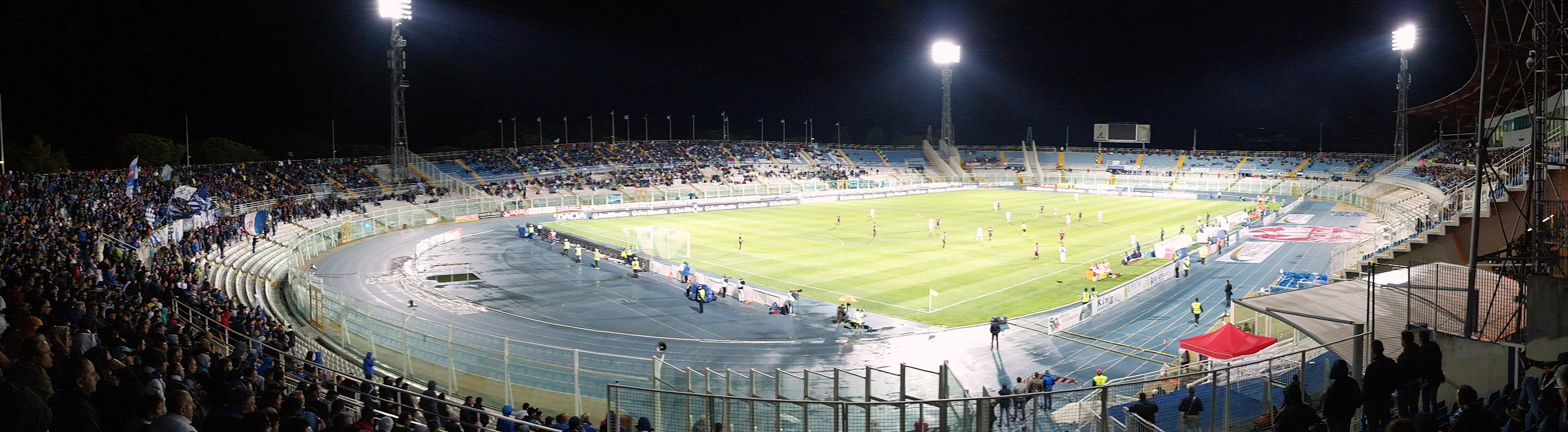
Interior view of the stadium in 2015.
