= Filippo Pellacani =

Italian footballer

Personal information
- Date of birth: 26 February 1998 (age 28)
- Place of birth: Verona, Italy
- Height: 1.87 m (6 ft 2 in)
- Position: Centre back

Team information
- Current team: Pescara
- Number: 23

Youth career
- Hellas Verona

Senior career*
Years	Team	Apps	(Gls)
2017–2018	Hellas Verona	0	(0)
2017–2018	→ Imolese (loan)	13	(0)
2018–2019	Villafranca	32	(6)
2019–2022	Virtus Verona	87	(6)
2022-	Pescara	52	(0)
- * Club domestic league appearances and goals as of 2 March 2026

Filippo Pellacani (born 26 February 1998) is an Italian professional footballer who plays as a centre back for Serie C Group B club Pescara.

== Club career ==
Pellacani was formed on Hellas Verona youth system. On 14 July 2017, he was loaned to Imolese.

On 2 May 2018, he joined Serie D club Villafranca. He scored six goals in 32 matches for the club.

In the 2019–20 season, he signed with Serie C club Virtus Verona. He made his professional debut on 25 August 2019 against Calcio Padova.

On 23 July 2022, Pellacani signed with serie Serie C club Pescara.
