= List of Italian football transfers summer 2025 =

The 2025 Italian football summer transfer window ran from 1 July to 1 September 2025 (20:00). Clubs could also sign players from 1 to 10 June 2025, in a brand new transfer window created on the occasion of the 2025 FIFA Club World Cup. This list includes transfers featuring at least one club from either Serie A or Serie B that were completed after the end of the 2024–25 season and before the end of the summer 2025 window on 1 September. Some contracts were already signed and announced before the window opening.

Clubs could not register new players until the opening of the winter transfer window, unless players had been unattached before 1 September 2025.

== Transfers ==
All players and clubs without a flag are Italian.

Legend

- Those clubs in Italic indicate that the player already left the team on loan on this or the previous season or a new signing that immediately left the club.

Date	Name	Moving from	Moving to	Fee
5 May 2025	(Argentina) Nehuén Pérez	Udinese	(Portugal) Porto	Undisclosed (Note: The player already played for his new club in the 2024–25 season, the deal turned from temporary to definitive.)
28 May 2025	Michael Kayode	Fiorentina	(England) Brentford	Undisclosed
1 June 2025	(Romania) Nicolae Stanciu	(Saudi Arabia) Damac	Genoa	Free
3 June 2025	Jacopo Sardo	(Germany) 1. FC Saarbrücken	Monza	Undisclosed
3 June 2025	(France) Enzo Le Fée	Roma	(England) Sunderland	Undisclosed
3 June 2025	(Spain) Álex Valle	(Spain) Barcelona	Como	Undisclosed
5 June 2025	(France) Pierre Kalulu	Milan	Juventus	Undisclosed
5 June 2025	(Portugal) Nuno Tavares	(England) Arsenal	Lazio	Undisclosed
5 June 2025	(Equatorial Guinea) Pedro Obiang	Sassuolo	Monza	Free
5 June 2025	(Croatia) Petar Sučić	(Croatia) Dinamo Zagreb	Inter	Undisclosed
6 June 2025	(Greece) Giorgos Kyriakopoulos	Monza	(Greece) Panathinaikos	Undisclosed
7 June 2025	(Brazil) Luis Henrique	(France) Marseille	Inter	Undisclosed
7 June 2025	(Argentina) Christian Ordóñez	(Argentina) Vélez	Parma	Undisclosed
9 June 2025	(Brazil) Natan	Napoli	(Spain) Betis	Undisclosed
10 June 2025	(Argentina) Juan Musso	Atalanta	(Spain) Atlético Madrid	Undisclosed
10 June 2025	(Argentina) Marco Pellegrino	Milan	(Argentina) Boca Juniors	Undisclosed
11 June 2025	(Netherlands) Tijjani Reijnders	Milan	(England) Manchester City	Undisclosed
12 June 2025	(Guinea-Bissau) Fali Candé	(France) Metz	Venezia	Undisclosed
12 June 2025	(Belgium) Kevin De Bruyne	(England) Manchester City	Napoli	Free
12 June 2025	(Sweden) Samuel Dahl	Roma	(Portugal) Benfica	Undisclosed
13 June 2025	Luca Marianucci	Empoli	Napoli	Undisclosed
13 June 2025	(Ivory Coast) Odilon Kossounou	(Germany) Bayer Leverkusen	Atalanta	Undisclosed
16 June 2025	(Croatia) Martin Baturina	(Croatia) Dinamo Zagreb	Como	Undisclosed
17 June 2025	Diego Coppola	Hellas Verona	(England) Brighton	Undisclosed
18 June 2025	Kevin Zeroli	Milan	Monza	Loan
20 June 2025	(Greece) Pantelis Chatzidiakos	Cagliari	(Denmark) Copenhagen	Undisclosed
20 June 2025	(Norway) Emil Ceïde	Sassuolo	(Norway) Rosenborg	Undisclosed
21 June 2025	Fellipe Jack	(Brazil) Palmeiras	Como	Undisclosed
23 June 2025	(Serbia) Filip Stanković	Inter	Venezia	Undisclosed
23 June 2025	Giuseppe Aurelio	Palermo	Spezia	Undisclosed
23 June 2025	(Poland) Nicola Zalewski	Roma	Inter	Undisclosed
23 June 2025	(Slovenia) Jaka Bijol	Udinese	(England) Leeds	Undisclosed
23 June 2025	(Denmark) Albert Grønbæk	(France) Rennes	Genoa	Loan
23 June 2025	(Albania) Adi Kurti	Empoli	Verona	Free
24 June 2025	(France) Michel Adopo	Atalanta	Cagliari	Undisclosed
24 June 2025	Roberto Piccoli	Atalanta	Cagliari	Undisclosed
24 June 2025	Elia Caprile	Napoli	Cagliari	Undisclosed
24 June 2025	Cristiano Biraghi	Fiorentina	Torino	Undisclosed
24 June 2025	Nicolò Bertola	Spezia	Udinese	Free
24 June 2025	(Iceland) Albert Guðmundsson	Genoa	Fiorentina	Undisclosed
25 June 2025	(Zambia) Kingstone Mutandwa	Cagliari	(Austria) Ried	Loan
25 June 2025	Jacopo Fazzini	Empoli	Fiorentina	Undisclosed
26 June 2025	Nicola Bagnolini	Bologna	Gubbio	Loan
26 June 2025	Edoardo Saporiti	Lucchese	Empoli	Free
26 June 2025	Marco Zunno	Cremonese	Crotone	Undisclosed
26 June 2025	Alessandro Dellavalle	Torino	Modena	Loan
27 June 2025	(France) Arthur Atta	(France) Metz	Udinese	Undisclosed
27 June 2025	(Turkey) İsak Vural	Frosinone	Pisa	Undisclosed
27 June 2025	(Brazil) Mateus Lusuardi	Frosinone	Pisa	Undisclosed
27 June 2025	(Argentina) Leandro Chichizola	Spezia	Modena	Free
27 June 2025	(Senegal) Demba Seck	Torino	(Serbia) Partizan	Loan
28 June 2025	Alessandro Louati	Pro Vercelli	Juve Stabia	Undisclosed
29 June 2025	(Ivory Coast) Owen Kouassi	(France) Laval	Lecce	Undisclosed
30 June 2025	Francesco Mezzoni	Napoli	Virtus Entella	Free
30 June 2025	Damiano Basili	Pergolettese	Reggiana	Undisclosed
1 July 2025	Alessio Castellini	Catania	Mantova	Loan
1 July 2025	Francesco Pio Vallarelli	Empoli	Reggiana	Undisclosed
1 July 2025	(Belgium) Lukas Mondele	Modena	(Belgium) Francs Borains	Undisclosed
1 July 2025	Matteo Ruggeri	Atalanta	(Spain) Atlético Madrid	Undisclosed
1 July 2025	Mattia Viti	(France) Nice	Fiorentina	Loan
2 July 2025	(France) Loum Tchaouna	Lazio	(England) Burnley	Undisclosed
2 July 2025	(Ghana) Kamaldeen Sulemana	(England) Southampton	Atalanta	Undisclosed
2 July 2025	(France) Yanis Massolin	(Belgium) Francs Borains	Modena	Undisclosed
2 July 2025	Eddie Salcedo	Inter	(Greece) OFI	Free
2 July 2025	(Republic of the Congo) Antoine Makoumbou	Cagliari	(Turkey) Samsunspor	Undisclosed
2 July 2025	(Spain) Jesús Rodríguez	(Spain) Betis	Como	Undisclosed
2 July 2025	(Chile) Thomas Gillier	(Chile) Universidad Católica	Bologna	Undisclosed
2 July 2025	Antonio Granata	Padova	Picerno	Undisclosed
2 July 2025	(Czech Republic) Daniel Samek	Lecce	(Czech Republic) Artis Brno	Undisclosed
2 July 2025	(Slovenia) Tio Cipot	Spezia	(Austria) GAK	Loan
3 July 2025	Andrea Favilli	Genoa	Avellino	Free
3 July 2025	(France) Thomas Henry	Verona	(Belgium) Standard Liège	Free
3 July 2025	(Spain) Rafa Marín	Napoli	(Spain) Villarreal	Loan
3 July 2025	(Togo) Steven Nador	SPAL	Modena	Undisclosed
3 July 2025	(Brazil) Jonathan Silva	Torino	Padova	Loan
3 July 2025	Samuele Ricci	Torino	Milan	Undisclosed
3 July 2025	Gabriele Alesi	Milan	Catanzaro	Undisclosed
3 July 2025	Christian Marietta	AlbinoLeffe	Catanzaro	Undisclosed
3 July 2025	(England) Tammy Abraham	Roma	(Turkey) Beşiktaş	Loan
3 July 2025	Tommaso Marras	Caldiero	Mantova	Undisclosed
4 July 2025	Luigi Palomba	Cagliari	Virtus Entella	Undisclosed
4 July 2025	Tommaso Fumagalli	Como	Virtus Entella	Loan
4 July 2025	Samuele Regazzetti	Cremonese	Ospitaletto	Loan
4 July 2025	Tommaso Ghirardello	Padova	Gubbio	Undisclosed
4 July 2025	Christian Pastina	Benevento	Padova	Undisclosed
4 July 2025	Honest Ahanor	Genoa	Atalanta	Undisclosed
4 July 2025	(Netherlands) Jayden Addai	(Netherlands) AZ	Como	Undisclosed
4 July 2025	(Canada) Jonathan David	(France) Lille	Juventus	Free
4 July 2025	(England) Tino Anjorin	Empoli	Torino	Loan
4 July 2025	Ruggero Frosinini	Trento	Catanzaro	Undisclosed
4 July 2025	Christian Sussi	Pisa	Pianese	Undisclosed
5 July 2025	(France) Ange-Yoan Bonny	Parma	Inter	Undisclosed
5 July 2025	(Portugal) Vivaldo Semedo	Udinese	(England) Watford	Undisclosed
5 July 2025	Adam Bakoune	Milan	Monza	Undisclosed
5 July 2025	Emiliano Filippis	Empoli	Pianese	Loan
6 July 2025	(Czech Republic) Martin Vitík	(Czech Republic) Sparta Prague	Bologna	Undisclosed
7 July 2025	(Netherlands) Bryant Nieling	(Netherlands) Cambuur	Modena	Undisclosed
7 July 2025	Simone Colombi	Rimini	Virtus Entella	Undisclosed
7 July 2025	Francesco Camarda	Milan	Lecce	Loan
7 July 2025	Marco Bleve	Lecce	Carrarese	Undisclosed
7 July 2025	Tommaso Pittino	Genoa	Mantova	Loan
7 July 2025	Filippo Lapo Vertua	Empoli	Ostiamare	Loan
7 July 2025	Michele Tempre	Empoli	Pontedera	Loan
8 July 2025	Tommaso Augello	Cagliari	Palermo	Free
8 July 2025	Riccardo Pagano	Roma	Bari	Loan
8 July 2025	(Albania) Ardian Ismajli	Empoli	Torino	Free
8 July 2025	(Slovenia) Žan Majer	Cremonese	Mantova	Free
8 July 2025	Luca D'Andrea	Sassuolo	Avellino	Loan
8 July 2025	Justin Kumi	Sassuolo	Avellino	Loan
8 July 2025	(Brazil) Giovane	(Brazil) Corinthians	Verona	Undisclosed
8 July 2025	(Romania) Darius Falcusan	Empoli	(Romania) Universitatea Craiova	Loan
8 July 2025	Massimo Bertagnoli	Brescia	Reggiana	Free
8 July 2025	Nicolas Galazzi	Brescia	Monza	Free
8 July 2025	(Senegal) Demba Thiam	SPAL	Monza	Free
8 July 2025	(The Gambia) Eliman Cham	Reggina	Carrarese	Undisclosed
9 July 2025	(Sweden) Joel Voelkerling Persson	Lecce	(Sweden) Östers	Undisclosed
9 July 2025	(Uruguay) Alan Matturro	Genoa	(Spain) Levante	Loan
9 July 2025	(Poland) Mateusz Praszelik	Verona	(Poland) Cracovia	Undisclosed
9 July 2025	(Romania) Rareș Ilie	(France) Nice	Empoli	Loan
9 July 2025	Pietro Pellegri	Torino	Empoli	Loan
9 July 2025	Marco Dalla Vecchia	Torino	Virtus Entella	Loan
9 July 2025	Davide Adorni	Brescia	Modena	Free
9 July 2025	Andrea Papetti	Brescia	Reggiana	Free
9 July 2025	Lorenzo Dickmann	Brescia	Bari	Free
9 July 2025	Gabriele Moncini	Brescia	Bari	Free
9 July 2025	Michele Cerofolini	Frosinone	Bari	Undisclosed
9 July 2025	Dimitri Bisoli	Brescia	Cesena	Free
9 July 2025	Alessandro Confente	Vicenza	Juve Stabia	Free
9 July 2025	Benedikt Rottensteiner	Südtirol	Bra	Loan
9 July 2025	(Switzerland) Benjamin Siegrist	(Romania) Rapid București	Genoa	Loan
10 July 2025	Valerio Crespi	Lazio	Avellino	Undisclosed
10 July 2025	Alessandro Milani	Lazio	Avellino	Loan
10 July 2025	(Uruguay) César Falletti	Cremonese	Mantova	Undisclosed
10 July 2025	(Bosnia and Herzegovina) Edin Džeko	(Turkey) Fenerbahçe	Fiorentina	Free
10 July 2025	Ciro Immobile	(Turkey) Beşiktaş	Bologna	Free
10 July 2025	(Uzbekistan) Eldor Shomurodov	Roma	(Turkey) Başakşehir	Loan
10 July 2025	(Albania) Alen Sherri	Cagliari	Frosinone	Loan
10 July 2025	(Brazil) Filipe Bordon	Lazio	Südtirol	Loan
10 July 2025	(Senegal) Mamadou Coulibaly	Catanzaro	Südtirol	Free
10 July 2025	Gennaro Borrelli	Brescia	Cagliari	Free
10 July 2025	(France) Théo Hernandez	Milan	(Saudi Arabia) Al Hilal	Undisclosed
10 July 2025	(Brazil) Luan Patrick	Verona	(Portugal) Estrela	Undisclosed
10 July 2025	(Croatia) Tomi Petrović	Trento	Juve Stabia	Undisclosed
10 July 2025	Matteo Guidi	Pontedera	Cesena	Free
10 July 2025	Mattia Maita	Bari	Benevento	Undisclosed
10 July 2025	(Croatia) Bartol Franjić	(Germany) VfL Wolfsburg	Venezia	Loan
10 July 2025	(Luxembourg) Seid Korać	(Serbia) Vojvodina	Venezia	Undisclosed
10 July 2025	Giacomo Maucci	Brescia	Pisa	Free
10 July 2025	Niccolò Chiorra	Empoli	Casarano	Undisclosed
10 July 2025	(Albania) Ervin Bashi	Pro Patria	Catanzaro	Undisclosed
11 July 2025	Mirko Elia	Fiorentina	Forlì	Loan
11 July 2025	Leonardo Baroncelli	Fiorentina	Gubbio	Loan
11 July 2025	(Argentina) Matías Moreno	Fiorentina	(Spain) Levante	Loan
11 July 2025	(Germany) Nicolas Kühn	(Scotland) Celtic	Como	Undisclosed
11 July 2025	(Argentina) Leandro Paredes	Roma	(Argentina) Boca Juniors	Undisclosed
11 July 2025	Andrea Bozzolan	Milan	Reggiana	Undisclosed
11 July 2025	Federico Agazzi	Cremonese	Alcione Milano	Loan
11 July 2025	Lorenzo Gori	Ghiviborgo	Frosinone	Undisclosed
11 July 2025	Gabriele Calvani	Genoa	Frosinone	Loan
11 July 2025	Emmanuele Matino	Bari	Salernitana	Undisclosed
11 July 2025	(Morocco) Ismail Achik	Bari	Salernitana	Undisclosed
11 July 2025	Marco Tremolada	Como	Pergolettese	Undisclosed
11 July 2025	(Argentina) Papu Gómez	Unattached	Padova	Free
11 July 2025	Daniele Baselli	Unattached	Padova	Free
11 July 2025	Riccardo Gagno	Modena	Vicenza	Undisclosed
11 July 2025	Emanuele Pecorino	Juve NG	Südtirol	Loan
12 July 2025	Gabriele Artistico	Lazio	Spezia	Loan
12 July 2025	(Denmark) Christian Gytkjær	Venezia	Bari	Free
12 July 2025	Mattia Compagnon	Juventus	Venezia	Loan
12 July 2025	Andrea Adorante	Juve Stabia	Venezia	Undisclosed
12 July 2025	(Georgia (country)) Luka Lochoshvili	Cremonese	(Germany) 1. FC Nürnberg	Undisclosed
13 July 2025	Eddy Cabianca	Cremonese	Salernitana	Loan
13 July 2025	(Spain) Antonio Casas	(Spain) Córdoba	Venezia	Free
14 July 2025	Paolo Ghiglione	Salernitana	Padova	Loan
14 July 2025	(Albania) Kleis Bozhanaj	Modena	Carrarese	Loan
14 July 2025	Filippo Distefano	Fiorentina	Carrarese	Loan
14 July 2025	Romano Floriani Mussolini	Lazio	Cremonese	Loan
14 July 2025	(Croatia) Luka Modrić	(Spain) Real Madrid	Milan	Free
14 July 2025	(Serbia) Uroš Račić	Sassuolo	(Greece) Aris	Undisclosed
14 July 2025	(Croatia) Lorenco Šimić	(Israel) Maccabi Haifa	Avellino	Undisclosed
14 July 2025	(Germany) Noah Mutanda	Avellino	Dolomiti Bellunesi	Loan
15 July 2025	Vincenzo Fiorillo	Salernitana	Carrarese	Undisclosed
15 July 2025	Daniele Donnarumma	Cesena	Catania	Undisclosed
15 July 2025	Simone Pieraccini	Cesena	Catania	Loan
15 July 2025	(Serbia) Vanja Vlahović	Atalanta	Spezia	Loan
15 July 2025	(Cameroon) Enzo Ebosse	Udinese	Verona	Loan
15 July 2025	(Burkina Faso) Abdoul Guiebre	Modena	Ascoli	Undisclosed
15 July 2025	Gennaro Anatriello	Bologna	Potenza	Loan
15 July 2025	Tommaso Rubino	Fiorentina	Carrarese	Loan
16 July 2025	Sebastiano Ebano	Spezia	Vis Pesaro	Loan
16 July 2025	(Portugal) João Moutinho	Spezia	(Poland) Lech Poznań	Undisclosed
16 July 2025	(Netherlands) Elayis Tavşan	Verona	Reggiana	Loan
16 July 2025	Giovanni Zaro	Modena	Cesena	Undisclosed
16 July 2025	(Finland) Niklas Pyyhtiä	Bologna	Modena	Loan
16 July 2025	(Belgium) Matthias Verreth	Brescia	Bari	Free
16 July 2025	(The Gambia) Joseph Ceesay	(Sweden) Malmö	Empoli	Loan
16 July 2025	(Ghana) Emmanuel Gyasi	Empoli	Palermo	Loan
16 July 2025	Gabriele Parlanti	(Netherlands) Feyenoord	Carrarese	Undisclosed
16 July 2025	Federico Accornero	Genoa	Carrarese	Undisclosed
16 July 2025	(France) Abdoulaye Camara	(France) Montpellier	Udinese	Undisclosed
16 July 2025	Antonino De Marco	Pescara	Potenza	Undisclosed
16 July 2025	(Denmark) Luca Kjerrumgaard	(Denmark) OB	Udinese	Undisclosed
16 July 2025	(Denmark) Luca Kjerrumgaard	Udinese	(England) Watford	Loan
16 July 2025	(Slovenia) Elian Demirović	Juve Stabia	(Slovenia) Primorje	Loan
17 July 2025	Niccolò Corrado	Brescia	Frosinone	Free
17 July 2025	Lapo Nava	Milan	Cremonese	Undisclosed
17 July 2025	Emanuele Rao	Napoli	Bari	Loan
17 July 2025	Gabriele Corbo	(Spain) Córdoba	Pescara	Free
17 July 2025	(Netherlands) Noa Lang	(Netherlands) PSV	Napoli	Undisclosed
17 July 2025	Antonio Raimondo	Bologna	Frosinone	Loan
17 July 2025	(France) Janis Antiste	Sassuolo	(Austria) Rapid Wien	Loan
17 July 2025	Federico Chinetti	Como	Trento	Loan
17 July 2025	Stefano Scognamillo	Catanzaro	Benevento	Undisclosed
17 July 2025	(Argentina) Franco Carboni	Inter	Empoli	Loan
17 July 2025	Giacomo Olzer	Brescia	Pescara	Free
17 July 2025	Matteo Onofri	Ravenna	Spezia	Free
18 July 2025	Tommaso Nucifero	Como	Giana Erminio	Loan
18 July 2025	(Argentina) Máximo Perrone	(England) Manchester City	Como	Undisclosed
18 July 2025	Lorenzo Lucca	Udinese	Napoli	Loan
18 July 2025	Michele Besaggio	Brescia	Avellino	Free
18 July 2025	(Romania) Valentin Mihăilă	Parma	(Turkey) Çaykur Rizespor	Undisclosed
18 July 2025	(Argentina) Valentín Carboni	Inter	Genoa	Loan
18 July 2025	Pietro Terracciano	Fiorentina	Milan	Undisclosed
18 July 2025	Marco Sportiello	Milan	Atalanta	Undisclosed
18 July 2025	(New Zealand) Liberato Cacace	Empoli	(England) Wrexham	Undisclosed
18 July 2025	(Spain) Pablo Rodríguez	Lecce	(Poland) Lech Poznań	Undisclosed
18 July 2025	Lorenzo Lucchesi	Fiorentina	Monza	Loan
18 July 2025	Matteo Rover	Südtirol	Reggiana	Undisclosed
18 July 2025	Thomas Alberti	Modena	Novara	Undisclosed
18 July 2025	(Greece) Dimitrios Nikolaou	Palermo	Bari	Loan
18 July 2025	(Morocco) Sayha Seha	(France) Marseille	Catanzaro	Free
19 July 2025	(Chile) Matías Pérez	(Chile) Curicó Unido	Lecce	Undisclosed
19 July 2025	Federico Bernardeschi	Unattached	Bologna	Free
19 July 2025	Alberto Grassi	Empoli	Cremonese	Undisclosed
19 July 2025	Patrick Nuamah	Brescia	Sassuolo	Free
19 July 2025	Patrick Nuamah	Sassuolo	Catanzaro	Loan
19 July 2025	Edoardo Masciangelo	Cittadella	Frosinone	Undisclosed
19 July 2025	Andrea Cisco	Südtirol	Union Brescia	Undisclosed
20 July 2025	(Morocco) Neil El Aynaoui	(France) Lens	Roma	Undisclosed
20 July 2025	(Netherlands) Sam Beukema	Bologna	Napoli	Undisclosed
20 July 2025	Lorenzo Amatucci	Fiorentina	(Spain) Las Palmas	Loan
21 July 2025	Mateo Retegui	Atalanta	(Saudi Arabia) Al-Qadsiah	Undisclosed
21 July 2025	Fabio Rispoli	Como	Catanzaro	Loan
21 July 2025	Gaetano Letizia	FeralpiSalò	Pescara	Free
21 July 2025	Carlo Crialese	Pescara	Cittadella	Undisclosed
22 July 2025	(Portugal) Francisco Conceição	(Portugal) Porto	Juventus	€30.4M
22 July 2025	(Nigeria) Ebenezer Akinsanmiro	Inter	Pisa	Loan
22 July 2025	(Cameroon) Jonathan Italeng	Atalanta U23	Südtirol	Loan
22 July 2025	Tommaso Pobega	Milan	Bologna	Loan
22 July 2025	(Albania) Kevin Haveri	Torino	Livorno	Loan
22 July 2025	Jacopo Antolini	Torino	Pergolettese	Loan
23 July 2025	(Republic of Ireland) Evan Ferguson	(England) Brighton	Roma	Loan
23 July 2025	(Portugal) Gonçalo Esteves	Udinese	(Portugal) Alverca	Loan
23 July 2025	Gianluca Di Chiara	Frosinone	Catanzaro	Free
23 July 2025	(Belgium) Samuel Mbangula	Juventus	(Germany) Werder Bremen	€10M
23 July 2025	(Romania) Răzvan Marin	Cagliari	(Greece) AEK Athens	Undisclosed
23 July 2025	Etienne Catena	Cagliari	Siracusa	Undisclosed
23 July 2025	Simone Scuffet	Cagliari	Pisa	Undisclosed
23 July 2025	(Republic of Ireland) Ed McJannet	Lecce	Ternana	Loan
23 July 2025	(Portugal) Leonardo Buta	Udinese	(Spain) Eibar	Loan
23 July 2025	(Denmark) Jesper Lindstrøm	Napoli	(Germany) VfL Wolfsburg	Loan
23 July 2025	(Uruguay) Joaquín Sosa	Bologna	(Colombia) Independiente Santa Fe	Loan
23 July 2025	Riccardo Stivanello	Bologna	Torres	Loan
23 July 2025	Antonio Palumbo	Modena	Palermo	Undisclosed
23 July 2025	Francesco Di Mariano	Palermo	Modena	Undisclosed
23 July 2025	(France) Noah Raveyre	Milan	(France) Pau FC	Undisclosed
24 July 2025	Roberto Insigne	Palermo	Avellino	Undisclosed
24 July 2025	Tommaso Ebone	Bologna	Trento	Loan
24 July 2025	Cristian Padula	Torino	Campobasso	Loan
24 July 2025	(Belgium) Cyril Ngonge	Napoli	Torino	Loan
24 July 2025	Michael Folorunsho	Napoli	Cagliari	Loan
24 July 2025	Giacomo De Pieri	Inter	Juve Stabia	Loan
24 July 2025	(Switzerland) Daniel Denoon	(Switzerland) Zürich	Pisa	Loan
24 July 2025	(Ecuador) Pervis Estupiñán	(England) Brighton	Milan	Undisclosed
24 July 2025	(Portugal) Alberto Costa	Juventus	(Portugal) Porto	€15M
24 July 2025	(Portugal) João Mário	(Portugal) Porto	Juventus	€11M
24 July 2025	(Serbia) Aleksandar Stanković	Inter	(Belgium) Club Brugge	Undisclosed
25 July 2025	Giuseppe Pezzella	Empoli	Cremonese	Undisclosed
25 July 2025	(Ivory Coast) Ange N'Guessan	Torino	(Czech Republic) Slovan Liberec	Loan
25 July 2025	(Poland) Sebastian Walukiewicz	Torino	Sassuolo	Loan
25 July 2025	(Spain) Unai Nuñez	(Spain) Celta Vigo	Verona	Loan
25 July 2025	Marco Curto	Como	Empoli	Undisclosed
25 July 2025	Valerio Mantovani	Ascoli	Mantova	Undisclosed
25 July 2025	Tommaso Ravaglioli	Bologna	Campobasso	Loan
25 July 2025	(Bosnia and Herzegovina) Eldin Lolić	(Bosnia and Herzegovina) Sloboda Tuzla	Frosinone	Undisclosed
26 July 2025	(Serbia) Vanja Milinković-Savić	Torino	Napoli	Loan
26 July 2025	Brando Moruzzi	Juventus	Empoli	Loan
26 July 2025	(Germany) Till Winkelmann	Lecce	Foggia	Undisclosed
27 July 2025	(Brazil) Emerson Royal	Milan	(Brazil) Flamengo	Undisclosed
27 July 2025	(Uruguay) Franco Israel	(Portugal) Sporting	Torino	Undisclosed
27 July 2025	(Indonesia) Emil Audero	Como	Cremonese	Loan
27 July 2025	(France) Lisandru Tramoni	Pisa	(Switzerland) Zürich	Undisclosed
27 July 2025	Mattia Bani	Genoa	Palermo	Undisclosed
28 July 2025	(Republic of Ireland) Corrie Ndaba	(Scotland) Kilmarnock	Lecce	Undisclosed
28 July 2025	(The Gambia) Alieu Fadera	Como	Sassuolo	Loan
28 July 2025	(Brazil) Wesley França	(Brazil) Flamengo	Roma	Undisclosed
28 July 2025	Lorenzo Colombo	Milan	Genoa	Loan
28 July 2025	Accursio Bentivegna	Pescara	Casertana	Undisclosed
28 July 2025	Giovanni Garofani	Juve NG	Carrarese	Undisclosed
28 July 2025	Giacomo Gabbiani	Cremonese	Giana Erminio	Loan
29 July 2025	(Norway) Leo Skiri Østigård	(France) Rennais	Genoa	Loan
29 July 2025	(Morocco) Zakaria Aboukhlal	(France) Toulouse	Torino	Undisclosed
29 July 2025	(Romania) Rareș Burnete	Lecce	Juve Stabia	Loan
29 July 2025	Federico Baschirotto	Lecce	Cremonese	Undisclosed
29 July 2025	Alessio Zerbin	Napoli	Cremonese	Loan
29 July 2025	Andrea Fulignati	Cremonese	Empoli	Loan
29 July 2025	Alessandro Nunziante	Benevento	Udinese	Undisclosed
29 July 2025	(Colombia) Devis Vásquez	Milan	Roma	Free
29 July 2025	(Canada) Ismaël Koné	(France) Marseille	Sassuolo	Loan
29 July 2025	(Canada) Tajon Buchanan	Inter	(Spain) Villarreal	Undisclosed
29 July 2025	Thomas Battistella	Modena	Juve Stabia	Undisclosed
30 July 2025	Giacomo Quagliata	Cremonese	(Spain) Deportivo La Coruña	Undisclosed
30 July 2025	(Poland) Mateusz Wieteska	Cagliari	(Turkey) Kocaelispor	Loan
30 July 2025	Luca Mazzitelli	Como	Cagliari	Loan
30 July 2025	Davide Bettella	Frosinone	Catanzaro	Free
30 July 2025	(Iceland) Andri Baldursson	Bologna	(Turkey) Kasımpaşa	Undisclosed
30 July 2025	Matteo Solini	Mantova	Ravenna	Undisclosed
30 July 2025	Lorenzo Andrenacci	Brescia	Mantova	Free
31 July 2025	(Switzerland) Dan Ndoye	Bologna	(England) Nottingham Forest	Undisclosed
31 July 2025	(Spain) Jacobo Ramón	(Spain) Real Madrid	Como	Undisclosed
31 July 2025	(Brazil) Gabriel Strefezza	Como	(Greece) Olympiacos	Undisclosed
31 July 2025	Andrea Cistana	Brescia	Spezia	Free
31 July 2025	Antonio Barreca	Südtirol	Padova	Free
31 July 2025	Jacopo Seghetti	Empoli	Livorno	Loan
31 July 2025	(Nigeria) Victor Osimhen	Napoli	(Turkey) Galatasaray	Undisclosed
31 July 2025	Giacomo Faticanti	Lecce	Juve NG	Loan
31 July 2025	Costantino Favasuli	Fiorentina	Catanzaro	Undisclosed
1 August 2025	Alphadjo Cissè	Verona	Catanzaro	Loan
1 August 2025	Pietro Boer	Roma	Juve Stabia	Undisclosed
1 August 2025	Mattia Mannini	Roma	Juve Stabia	Loan
1 August 2025	(Morocco) Oussama El Azzouzi	Bologna	(France) Auxerre	Loan
1 August 2025	Luca Lezzerini	Brescia	Fiorentina	Free
1 August 2025	Alex Redolfi	Mantova	Cittadella	Undisclosed
1 August 2025	(Albania) Marvin Çuni	(Russia) Rubin Kazan	Sampdoria	Loan
1 August 2025	(Libya) Ahmad Benali	Bari	Virtus Entella	Undisclosed
1 August 2025	Andrea Corbari	Virtus Entella	Catania	Undisclosed
1 August 2025	Luca Di Maggio	Inter	Padova	Loan
2 August 2025	(Slovenia) Nik Prelec	Cagliari	(England) Oxford United	Loan
2 August 2025	(Denmark) David Stückler	Cremonese	Vicenza	Loan
2 August 2025	(Denmark) Oliver Christensen	Fiorentina	(Austria) Sturm Graz	Loan
2 August 2025	(Poland) Jakub Piotrowski	(Bulgaria) Ludogorets	Udinese	Undisclosed
2 August 2025	Daniele Ghilardi	Verona	Roma	Undisclosed
2 August 2025	(United States) Jack de Vries	Venezia	(Netherlands) Den Bosch	Undisclosed
3 August 2025	(Turkey) Semih Kılıçsoy	(Turkey) Beşiktaş	Cagliari	Loan
3 August 2025	(Croatia) Domagoj Bradarić	Salernitana	Verona	Undisclosed
3 August 2025	(Switzerland) Michel Aebischer	Bologna	Pisa	Loan
3 August 2025	(Saudi Arabia) Saud Abdulhamid	Roma	(France) Lens	Loan
3 August 2025	(Spain) Jalen Blesa	(Romania) Universitatea Craiova	Cesena	Free
4 August 2025	(Norway) Ola Solbakken	Roma	(Norway) Nordsjælland	Undisclosed
4 August 2025	(Croatia) Martin Erlić	Bologna	(Denmark) Midtjylland	Undisclosed
4 August 2025	(Senegal) Abdoulaye Ndiaye	(France) Troyes	Parma	Undisclosed
4 August 2025	(Switzerland) Simon Sohm	Parma	Fiorentina	Undisclosed
4 August 2025	Alessio Brambilla	Cremonese	Bra	Loan
4 August 2025	Mattia Scaringi	Cremonese	Ravenna	Loan
4 August 2025	Joshua Tenkorang	Cremonese	Ravenna	Undisclosed
4 August 2025	Ousmane Niang	Modena	Gubbio	Loan
4 August 2025	Lorenzo Di Stefano	Modena	Torres	Undisclosed
4 August 2025	Danilo Quaranta	Juve Stabia	Reggiana	Undisclosed
4 August 2025	Christian Comotto	Milan	Spezia	Loan
5 August 2025	(Argentina) Juan Manuel Cruz	Verona	Trento	Loan
5 August 2025	(Netherlands) Melle Meulensteen	Sampdoria	(Netherlands) Go Ahead Eagles	Undisclosed
5 August 2025	(United States) Kristoffer Lund	Palermo	(Germany) 1. FC Köln	Loan
5 August 2025	(Georgia (country)) Saba Goglichidze	Empoli	Udinese	Undisclosed
5 August 2025	Alessandro Vimercati	Südtirol	Picerno	Loan
5 August 2025	Lorenzo Lonardi	Südtirol	Ravenna	Undisclosed
5 August 2025	Alessandro Garattoni	Virtus Entella	AlbinoLeffe	Undisclosed
5 August 2025	Giacomo Stabile	Inter	Juve Stabia	Loan
6 August 2025	(Austria) Matthias Braunöder	Como	Bari	Loan
6 August 2025	(Democratic Republic of the Congo) Samuel Ntanda-Lukisa	Sampdoria	(Belgium) Anderlecht	Undisclosed
6 August 2025	(United States) Timothy Weah	Juventus	(France) Marseille	Loan
6 August 2025	(Switzerland) Ardon Jashari	(Belgium) Club Brugge	Milan	Undisclosed
6 August 2025	(Colombia) Juan Cuadrado	Atalanta	Pisa	Free
6 August 2025	Erasmo Mulè	Avellino	Guidonia	Undisclosed
6 August 2025	Andrea Mazza	Monza	Giana Erminio	Undisclosed
6 August 2025	Riccardo Ciervo	Sassuolo	Cesena	Loan
6 August 2025	(Spain) Siren Diao	Atalanta	Cesena	Loan
7 August 2025	(France) Jordan Ferri	(France) Montpellier	Sampdoria	Undisclosed
7 August 2025	(Belgium) Zinho Vanheusden	Inter	(Spain) Marbella	Undisclosed
7 August 2025	(Sweden) Jens Cajuste	Napoli	(England) Ipswich Town	Loan
7 August 2025	(Argentina) Giovanni Simeone	Napoli	Torino	Loan
7 August 2025	(Angola) M'Bala Nzola	Fiorentina	Pisa	Loan
7 August 2025	Salvatore Dore	Cremonese	Pergolettese	Loan
7 August 2025	Luca Zanimacchia	Cremonese	Modena	Loan
7 August 2025	Tommaso Milanese	Cremonese	Ascoli	Loan
7 August 2025	(England) Ronaldo Vieira	Sampdoria	(United States) San Jose Earthquakes	Undisclosed
7 August 2025	(Scotland) Liam Henderson	Empoli	Sampdoria	Free
7 August 2025	(Portugal) Herculano Nabian	Empoli	Pontedera	Loan
7 August 2025	Giacomo Calò	Cesena	Frosinone	Loan
8 August 2025	(Romania) Alexandru Borbei	Lecce	Foggia	Loan
8 August 2025	(France) Max Denis	Lecce	(France) Dinan Léhon	Loan
8 August 2025	Tommaso Arrigoni	Südtirol	Cesena	Undisclosed
8 August 2025	Salvatore Burrai	Mantova	Dolomiti Bellunesi	Undisclosed
8 August 2025	Federico Bonini	Catanzaro	(Spain) Almería	Undisclosed
8 August 2025	Gennaro Tutino	Sampdoria	Avellino	Loan
8 August 2025	(France) Florian Thauvin	Udinese	(France) Lens	Undisclosed
8 August 2025	(Croatia) Karlo Lulić	Bari	Casarano	Undisclosed
8 August 2025	Francesco Bardi	Reggiana	Palermo	Free
8 August 2025	Sebastiano Desplanches	Palermo	Pescara	Loan
8 August 2025	Lorenzo Sgarbi	Napoli	Pescara	Loan
8 August 2025	Enrico Piovanello	Juve Stabia	Crotone	Loan
8 August 2025	Anthony Partipilo	Parma	Bari	Loan
8 August 2025	Antonio Donnarumma	Torino	Salernitana	Undisclosed
8 August 2025	Mattia Liberali	Milan	Catanzaro	Undisclosed
8 August 2025	Salvatore Elia	Spezia	Empoli	Undisclosed
8 August 2025	(Spain) Gerard Yepes	Sampdoria	Empoli	Free
8 August 2025	(Senegal) Maguette Fall	Virtus Entella	Monopoli	Loan
8 August 2025	(Portugal) Afonso Peixoto	Venezia	(Portugal) Torreense	Undisclosed
9 August 2025	(Indonesia) Jay Idzes	Venezia	Sassuolo	Undisclosed
9 August 2025	Giacomo Cavallini	Reggiana	Forlì	Loan
9 August 2025	Leonardo Mendicino	Atalanta	Reggiana	Loan
9 August 2025	Andrea Seculin	Trapani	Reggiana	Undisclosed
10 August 2025	(Guinea-Bissau) Fali Candé	Venezia	Sassuolo	Undisclosed
10 August 2025	Riccardo Sottil	Fiorentina	Lecce	Loan
10 August 2025	(Denmark) Henrik Meister	(France) Rennais	Pisa	Undisclosed
11 August 2025	Filippo Terracciano	Milan	Cremonese	Loan
11 August 2025	(Brazil) Paulo Azzi	Cremonese	Monza	Undisclosed
11 August 2025	Luca Ravanelli	Cremonese	Monza	Undisclosed
11 August 2025	Filippo Delli Carri	Padova	Monza	Undisclosed
11 August 2025	Rachid Kouda	Parma	Spezia	Loan
11 August 2025	Michele D'Ausilio	Avellino	Catania	Loan
11 August 2025	Sebastian Esposito	Lecce	(Australia) Melbourne Victory	Undisclosed
11 August 2025	Nicolò Calabrese	Verona	Carrarese	Loan
11 August 2025	Giacomo Raspadori	Napoli	(Spain) Atlético Madrid	Undisclosed
12 August 2025	(France) Warren Bondo	Milan	Cremonese	Loan
12 August 2025	(Spain) Álvaro Morata	Milan	Como	Loan
12 August 2025	(Croatia) Tomi Petrović	Juve Stabia	Treviso	Loan
12 August 2025	Gianluca Frabotta	(England) WBA	Cesena	Free
12 August 2025	Gianmarco Castorri	Cesena	Foggia	Loan
12 August 2025	Giovanni Perini	Cesena	Novara	Loan
12 August 2025	Alessandro Debenedetti	Genoa	Virtus Entella	Loan
12 August 2025	Andrea Pavanello	Pisa	Ospitaletto	Loan
12 August 2025	Matteo Tessitori	Reggiana	Folgore Caratese	Loan
12 August 2025	Alex Sposito	Reggiana	Trapani	Undisclosed
12 August 2025	(France) Yannis Nahounou	Reggiana	(France) Nancy	Undisclosed
12 August 2025	(Romania) Dennis Man	Parma	(Netherlands) PSV	Undisclosed
12 August 2025	(Germany) Malick Thiaw	Milan	(England) Newcastle	Undisclosed
12 August 2025	(Denmark) Oliver Sørensen	(Denmark) Midtjylland	Parma	Undisclosed
12 August 2025	Sebastiano Esposito	Inter	Cagliari	Loan
12 August 2025	(Moldova) Cornelius Staver	Pescara	Foggia	Undisclosed
13 August 2025	(Belgium) Koni De Winter	Genoa	Milan	Undisclosed
13 August 2025	(Argentina) Lautaro Giannetti	Udinese	(Turkey) Antalyaspor	Undisclosed
13 August 2025	(Scotland) Lennon Miller	(Scotland) Motherwell	Udinese	Undisclosed
13 August 2025	Antonio David	Cesena	Inter U23	Loan
13 August 2025	Fabio Ruggeri	Lazio	Carrarese	Undisclosed
13 August 2025	Alessio Cacciamani	Torino	Juve Stabia	Loan
13 August 2025	Marco Silvestri	Empoli	Cremonese	Free
13 August 2025	Michael Venturi	Cosenza	Venezia	Undisclosed
13 August 2025	Massimo Zilli	Cosenza	Frosinone	Loan
13 August 2025	(Spain) Víctor Narro	(Spain) Gimnàstic	Sampdoria	Undisclosed
13 August 2025	(Kosovo) Arijanet Muric	(England) Ipswich	Sassuolo	Loan
14 August 2025	(Sierra Leone) Yayah Kallon	Verona	Casertana	Undisclosed
14 August 2025	(Republic of Ireland) Senan Mullen	Torino	Mantova	Loan
14 August 2025	Kevin Cannavò	Vis Pesaro	Venezia	Undisclosed
14 August 2025	Kevin Cannavò	Venezia	Cosenza	Loan
14 August 2025	Fabio Abiuso	Modena	Carrarese	Loan
14 August 2025	(Portugal) Louis Mouquet	(France) Paris Saint-Germain	Padova	Free
14 August 2025	(France) Sofiane Achour	Cagliari	Cosenza	Undisclosed
15 August 2025	(Switzerland) Zachary Athekame	(Switzerland) Young Boys	Milan	Undisclosed
15 August 2025	Vittorio Magni	Milan	Cesena	Loan
15 August 2025	(Norway) Torbjørn Heggem	(England) WBA	Bologna	Undisclosed
15 August 2025	(Slovenia) Lovro Štubljar	Empoli	(Netherlands) Groningen	Undisclosed
15 August 2025	(Croatia) Matija Frigan	(Belgium) Westerlo	Parma	Undisclosed
15 August 2025	Giovanni Leoni	Parma	(England) Liverpool	Undisclosed
16 August 2025	(France) Antoine Hainaut	Parma	Venezia	Undisclosed
16 August 2025	Alessandro Pietrelli	Juventus	Venezia	Loan
16 August 2025	Alvin Okoro	Venezia	Juve NG	Loan
16 August 2025	Antonio Candela	Venezia	Spezia	Loan
18 August 2025	Filippo Reale	Roma	Juve Stabia	Loan
18 August 2025	Nosa Obaretin	Napoli	Empoli	Loan
18 August 2025	Marco Nasti	Cremonese	Empoli	Loan
18 August 2025	Matteo Lovato	Salernitana	Empoli	Loan
18 August 2025	Antonio Di Nardo	Campobasso	Pescara	Undisclosed
18 August 2025	(Poland) Nicola Zalewski	Inter	Atalanta	Undisclosed
18 August 2025	(Albania) Marash Kumbulla	Roma	(Spain) Mallorca	Loan
18 August 2025	(Serbia) Marko Lazetić	Milan	(Scotland) Aberdeen	Undisclosed
19 August 2025	(Cameroon) Jackson Tchatchoua	Verona	(England) Wolverhampton	Undisclosed
19 August 2025	(Belgium) Rafik Belghali	(Belgium) Mechelen	Verona	Undisclosed
19 August 2025	(Belgium) Gaëtan Coucke	(Saudi Arabia) Al-Orobah	Sampdoria	Undisclosed
19 August 2025	Filippo Sgarbi	Cosenza	Padova	Undisclosed
19 August 2025	Alessandro Sorrentino	Monza	Padova	Loan
19 August 2025	Andrea Antonello	Padova	Dolomiti Bellunesi	Loan
19 August 2025	Federico Brancolini	Empoli	Salernitana	Loan
19 August 2025	Andrea Oliveri	Atalanta	Pescara	Loan
19 August 2025	(Slovenia) Jan Mlakar	Pisa	(France) Amiens	Loan
19 August 2025	(Spain) Miguel Gutiérrez	(Spain) Girona	Napoli	Undisclosed
20 August 2025	(Jamaica) Leon Bailey	(England) Aston Villa	Roma	Loan
20 August 2025	Nadir Zortea	Cagliari	Bologna	Undisclosed
20 August 2025	Alessandro Fontanarosa	Inter	Avellino	Undisclosed
20 August 2025	(Poland) Mateusz Kowalski	Parma	(Portugal) Torreense	Loan
20 August 2025	(Netherlands) Julian Brandes	(Netherlands) Ajax	Pescara	Undisclosed
20 August 2025	(Montenegro) Nikola Krstović	Lecce	Atalanta	Undisclosed
20 August 2025	Alessandro Livieri	Pisa	Pro Vercelli	Undisclosed
20 August 2025	Marco Olivieri	Triestina	Cesena	Free
20 August 2025	(Denmark) Oliver Abildgaard	Como	Sampdoria	Undisclosed
21 August 2025	Marco Balzano	Pescara	Potenza	Undisclosed
21 August 2025	Federico Magro	Verona	Foggia	Loan
21 August 2025	Kevin Lasagna	Verona	Padova	Undisclosed
21 August 2025	(Croatia) Josip Brekalo	Fiorentina	(Spain) Real Oviedo	Free
21 August 2025	(Denmark) Victor Nelsson	(Turkey) Galatasaray	Verona	Loan
21 August 2025	(Germany) Jamil Siebert	(Germany) Fortuna Düsseldorf	Lecce	Undisclosed
21 August 2025	Alessio Buttaro	Palermo	Foggia	Loan
21 August 2025	Davide Veroli	Cagliari	Palermo	Loan
21 August 2025	(Finland) Jesse Joronen	Venezia	Palermo	Free
21 August 2025	Gaetano Castrovilli	Lazio	Bari	Free
21 August 2025	Mirko Antonucci	Spezia	Bari	Loan
21 August 2025	Nicholas Bonfanti	Pisa	Mantova	Loan
21 August 2025	(United States) Andrija Novakovich	Venezia	Reggiana	Undisclosed
21 August 2025	Diego Stramaccioni	Reggiana	Trapani	Undisclosed
21 August 2025	(Argentina) Mariano Troilo	(Argentina) Belgrano	Parma	Undisclosed
21 August 2025	Luigi Cherubini	Roma	Sampdoria	Loan
21 August 2025	Antonino La Gumina	Sampdoria	Inter U23	Loan
21 August 2025	(Switzerland) Noah Okafor	Milan	(England) Leeds	Undisclosed
21 August 2025	(Brazil) Douglas Luiz	Juventus	(England) Nottingham Forest	Loan
21 August 2025	(Paraguay) Antonio Sanabria	Torino	Cremonese	Undisclosed
22 August 2025	Elia Tantalocchi	Sampdoria	Campobasso	Loan
22 August 2025	(England) Ben Godfrey	Atalanta	(England) Sheffield United	Loan
22 August 2025	Leonardo Loria	Pisa	Spezia	Loan
22 August 2025	(France) Andy Diouf	(France) Lens	Inter	Loan
22 August 2025	(Brazil) Brenner	Udinese	(United States) Cincinnati	Loan
22 August 2025	(Argentina) Martín Payero	Udinese	Cremonese	Loan
22 August 2025	Simone Pafundi	Udinese	Sampdoria	Loan
22 August 2025	Alessandro Sersanti	Juventus	Modena	Loan
22 August 2025	(Belgium) Aster Vranckx	(Germany) VfL Wolfsburg	Sassuolo	Loan
23 August 2025	(Spain) Álex Sala	(Spain) Córdoba	Lecce	Undisclosed
24 August 2025	(England) Jonathan Rowe	(France) Marseille	Bologna	Undisclosed
25 August 2025	(Albania) Kristjan Asllani	Inter	Torino	Loan
25 August 2025	(Republic of the Congo) Silvère Ganvoula	Monza	(Saudi Arabia) Al-Fayha	Undisclosed
25 August 2025	Lorenzo Moretti	Cremonese	Virtus Entella	Loan
25 August 2025	Roberto Piccoli	Cagliari	Fiorentina	Undisclosed
25 August 2025	Gian Marco Crespi	Spezia	(Greece) Kallithea	Undisclosed
25 August 2025	(Brazil) Ruan Tressoldi	Sassuolo	(Brazil) Atlético Mineiro	Loan
26 August 2025	(Serbia) Nemanja Matić	(France) Lyon	Sassuolo	Free
26 August 2025	(Albania) Angelo Ndrecka	Virtus Entella	Ternana	Undisclosed
26 August 2025	(Switzerland) Sascha Britschgi	(Switzerland) Luzern	Parma	Undisclosed
26 August 2025	(Poland) Adam Buksa	(Denmark) Midtjylland	Udinese	Undisclosed
26 August 2025	(Chile) Damián Pizarro	Udinese	(France) Le Havre	Loan
26 August 2025	(Bosnia and Herzegovina) Dario Šarić	Palermo	(Turkey) Antalyaspor	Undisclosed
26 August 2025	(Mali) El Bilal Touré	Atalanta	(Turkey) Beşiktaş	Loan
26 August 2025	Marco Palestra	Atalanta	Cagliari	Loan
26 August 2025	Giacomo Drago	Südtirol	Lumezzane	Loan
26 August 2025	(Brazil) Arthur Melo	Juventus	(Brazil) Grêmio	Loan
26 August 2025	Samuele Mulattieri	Sassuolo	(Spain) Deportivo La Coruña	Loan
26 August 2025	Halid Djankpata	Spezia	Gubbio	Loan
27 August 2025	Leonardo Cerri	Juventus	Bari	Loan
27 August 2025	(Germany) Armel Bella-Kotchap	(England) Southampton	Verona	Loan
27 August 2025	(Serbia) Nikola Štulić	(Belgium) Charleroi	Lecce	Undisclosed
27 August 2025	(Poland) Bartosz Salamon	(Poland) Lech Poznań	Carrarese	Undisclosed
27 August 2025	Alessandro Russo	Sassuolo	Giugliano	Loan
27 August 2025	(Uruguay) Agustín Álvarez	Sassuolo	Monza	Loan
27 August 2025	Edoardo Vergani	Südtirol	Frosinone	Free
27 August 2025	Matteo Michele Leonardo	Spezia	Scafatese	Loan
27 August 2025	(Democratic Republic of the Congo) Charles Pickel	Cremonese	(Spain) Espanyol	Undisclosed
27 August 2025	Andrea Beghetto	Pisa	Vis Pesaro	Loan
27 August 2025	Mattia Sala	Pisa	Torres	Loan
27 August 2025	(France) Ahmed Sidibé	(Slovenia) Koper	Venezia	Undisclosed
27 August 2025	(Sweden) Peter Amoran	Parma	Cesena	Loan
27 August 2025	Roberto Ogunseye	Cesena	Perugia	Loan
27 August 2025	(Nigeria) Gift Orban	(Germany) TSG Hoffenheim	Verona	Loan
27 August 2025	(Portugal) Tiago Djaló	Juventus	(Turkey) Beşiktaş	Undisclosed
28 August 2025	Gaetano Oristanio	Venezia	Parma	Loan
28 August 2025	(France) Antoine Joujou	Parma	(Portugal) Famalicão	Loan
28 August 2025	Pietro Beruatto	Pisa	Spezia	Loan
28 August 2025	(Bulgaria) Adrian Raychev	Pisa	Frosinone	Loan
28 August 2025	(Netherlands) Calvin Stengs	(Netherlands) Feyenoord	Pisa	Loan
28 August 2025	(Spain) Iván Azón	Como	(England) Ipswich Town	Loan
28 August 2025	Patrick Cutrone	Como	Parma	Loan
28 August 2025	(Latvia) Dario Šits	Parma	(Spain) Atlético Madrid	Loan
28 August 2025	Giovanni Corradini	Spezia	Ascoli	Undisclosed
28 August 2025	Federico Tavernaro	Venezia	Vis Pesaro	Undisclosed
28 August 2025	Giacomo Manzari	Bari	Perugia	Loan
28 August 2025	(Bulgaria) Velizar-Ilia Iliev	Cagliari	Cerignola	Loan
29 August 2025	(Croatia) Nikola Čavlina	(Croatia) Dinamo Zagreb	Como	Loan
29 August 2025	Filippo Missori	Sassuolo	Avellino	Undisclosed
29 August 2025	(Poland) Jan Ziółkowski	(Poland) Legia Warsaw	Roma	Undisclosed
29 August 2025	Matteo Casarotto	Virtus Entella	Casertana	Undisclosed
29 August 2025	Alessandro Vinciguerra	Cagliari	Pescara	Loan
29 August 2025	Nicola Valente	Padova	Siracusa	Undisclosed
29 August 2025	Michele Castagnetti	Cremonese	Cesena	Undisclosed
29 August 2025	Nicholas Scardigno	Sampdoria	Virtus Verona	Loan
29 August 2025	Nikola Sekulov	Sampdoria	Carrarese	Loan
29 August 2025	(Libya) Al-Musrati	(Turkey) Beşiktaş	Verona	Loan
29 August 2025	Andrea Giorgini	Südtirol	Juve Stabia	Loan
30 August 2025	(France) Christopher Nkunku	(England) Chelsea	Milan	Undisclosed
30 August 2025	Nicolò Savona	Juventus	(England) Nottingham Forest	Undisclosed
30 August 2025	Alessandro Gabrielloni	Como	Juve Stabia	Undisclosed
30 August 2025	(Greece) Christos Papadopoulos	Genoa	Atalanta U23	Loan
30 August 2025	(Poland) Iwo Kaczmarski	Empoli	Inter U23	Loan
30 August 2025	(France) Côme Bianay Balcot	Torino	Ternana	Loan
30 August 2025	Hans Nicolussi Caviglia	Venezia	Fiorentina	Loan
30 August 2025	Luca Pandolfi	Cittadella	Catanzaro	Loan
30 August 2025	Federico Di Francesco	Palermo	Catanzaro	Loan
30 August 2025	Samuel Giovane	Atalanta	Palermo	Loan
30 August 2025	Marco Toscano	Avellino	Casertana	Loan
30 August 2025	(Romania) Andrei Coubiș	Milan	Sampdoria	Loan
31 August 2025	(Nigeria) David Ankeye	Genoa	Virtus Entella	Loan
31 August 2025	Alessandro Vogliacco	Genoa	(Greece) PAOK	Loan
31 August 2025	(Brazil) Charlys	Verona	Reggiana	Loan
31 August 2025	Giovanni Volpe	Catanzaro	Monopoli	Loan
31 August 2025	Gianmarco Todisco	Avellino	Cerignola	Loan
31 August 2025	Gabriele Gori	Avellino	Ascoli	Loan
31 August 2025	(Greece) Kostas Tsimikas	(England) Liverpool	Roma	Loan
31 August 2025	(Morocco) Anass Salah-Eddine	Roma	(Netherlands) PSV	Loan
31 August 2025	(Sweden) Noel Törnqvist	(Sweden) Mjällby	Como	Undisclosed
31 August 2025	(Sweden) Noel Törnqvist	Como	(Sweden) Mjällby	Loan
31 August 2025	(Cameroon) Faris Moumbagna	(France) Marseille	Cremonese	Loan
31 August 2025	(Iran) Mehdi Taremi	Inter	(Greece) Olympiacos	Loan
31 August 2025	Davide Castelli	Virtus Entella	Cittadella	Loan
1 September 2025	(Ghana) Tariq Lamptey	(England) Brighton	Fiorentina	Undisclosed
1 September 2025	Alessandro Bianco	Fiorentina	(Greece) PAOK	Loan
1 September 2025	(Czech Republic) Antonín Barák	Fiorentina	Sampdoria	Loan
1 September 2025	(Denmark) Alexander Lind	Pisa	(Denmark) Nordsjælland	Loan
1 September 2025	(Lithuania) Edgaras Dubickas	Pisa	Ternana	Undisclosed
1 September 2025	(Bulgaria) Edgaras Dubickas	Pisa	Ternana	Loan
1 September 2025	(Germany) Yannik Engelhardt	Como	(Germany) Borussia Mönchengladbach	Loan
1 September 2025	Davide Buglio	Juve Stabia	Catanzaro	Loan
1 September 2025	Alessandro Zanoli	Napoli	Udinese	Loan
1 September 2025	Cristiano De Paoli	Udinese	Como	Loan
1 September 2025	Fellipe Jack	Como	Spezia	Loan
1 September 2025	Simone Giorgeschi	Spezia	Alcione	Loan
1 September 2025	Francesco Plaia	Spezia	(Qatar) Al-Waab	Undisclosed
1 September 2025	Ettore Quirini	Milan	Salernitana	Undisclosed
1 September 2025	(Cape Verde) Dailon Livramento	Verona	(Portugal) Casa Pia	Loan
1 September 2025	Andrea Ghion	Sassuolo	Empoli	Loan
1 September 2025	(Cape Verde) Álex Jiménez	Milan	(England) Bournemouth	Loan
1 September 2025	(United States) Yunus Musah	Milan	Atalanta	Loan
1 September 2025	(Ghana) Ibrahim Sulemana	Atalanta	Bologna	Loan
1 September 2025	Tommaso Corazza	Bologna	Pescara	Loan
1 September 2025	Giuseppe Saccomanni	Pescara	Pineto	Loan
1 September 2025	(France) Mathis Lambourde	Verona	Reggiana	Loan
1 September 2025	Simone Leonardi	Sampdoria	Catania	Loan
1 September 2025	Filippo Faggi	Bari	Pontedera	Loan
1 September 2025	Alessandro Tripaldelli	Bari	Reggiana	Undisclosed
1 September 2025	Andrea Meroni	Reggiana	Bari	Undisclosed
1 September 2025	Riccardo Burgio	Potenza	Bari	Undisclosed
1 September 2025	(The Gambia) Ebrima Darboe	Roma	Bari	Undisclosed
1 September 2025	(Cameroon) Jean Onana	(Turkey) Beşiktaş	Genoa	Loan
1 September 2025	(Norway) Emil Bohinen	Genoa	Venezia	Loan
1 September 2025	Daniel Fossati	Genoa	Foggia	Loan
1 September 2025	Davide Mancini	Campobasso	Südtirol	Loan
1 September 2025	(Ghana) Niels Nkounkou	(Germany) Eintracht Frankfurt	Torino	Loan
1 September 2025	(North Macedonia) Eljif Elmas	(Germany) RB Leipzig	Napoli	Loan
1 September 2025	Kevin Martins	Monza	Sambenedettese	Loan
1 September 2025	Tommaso Del Lungo	Atalanta	Virtus Entella	Loan
1 September 2025	Giorgio Cittadini	Atalanta	Frosinone	Loan
1 September 2025	(Argentina) Nicolás González	Juventus	(Spain) Atlético Madrid	Loan
1 September 2025	Andrea Sodero	Empoli	Pianese	Loan
1 September 2025	(Belgium) Jeremy Moray	Empoli	Rimini	Loan
1 September 2025	(Denmark) Ank Asmussen	Empoli	Rimini	Loan
1 September 2025	Mattia Malaspina	Milan	Novara	Undisclosed
1 September 2025	(France) Adrien Rabiot	(France) Marseille	Milan	Undisclosed
1 September 2025	(Germany) David Odogu	(Germany) VfL Wolfsburg	Milan	Undisclosed
1 September 2025	(Austria) Stefan Posch	Bologna	Como	Loan
1 September 2025	(Ivory Coast) Ben Lhassine Kone	Como	Frosinone	Loan
1 September 2025	Giuseppe Mazzaglia	Como	Piacenza	Loan
1 September 2025	Tommaso Cassandro	Como	Catanzaro	Loan
1 September 2025	Paolo Frascatore	Avellino	Salernitana	Undisclosed
1 September 2025	Giulio Maggiore	Salernitana	Bari	Free
1 September 2025	Andrea Ferraris	Pescara	Salernitana	Loan
1 September 2025	(Spain) Paco Esteban	(Spain) Betis	Lecce	Undisclosed
1 September 2025	(Spain) Rémi Oudin	Lecce	Catanzaro	Undisclosed
1 September 2025	(Nigeria) Orji Okwonkwo	Bologna	Pescara	Loan
1 September 2025	Frank Tsadjout	Cremonese	Pescara	Loan
1 September 2025	Yuri Rocchetti	Cremonese	Potenza	Loan
1 September 2025	Gianluca Saro	Cremonese	Reggiana	Loan
1 September 2025	(Senegal) Mikayil Faye	(France) Rennes	Cremonese	Loan
1 September 2025	(Ecuador) Jeremy Sarmiento	(England) Brighton	Cremonese	Loan
1 September 2025	Filippo Neri (footballer)	Venezia	Triestina	Loan
1 September 2025	Luis Hasa	Napoli	Carrarese	Loan
1 September 2025	(Morocco) Walid Cheddira	Napoli	Sassuolo	Loan
1 September 2025	(Denmark) Rasmus Højlund	(England) Manchester United	Napoli	Loan
1 September 2025	Giovanni Bonfanti	Atalanta	Pisa	Loan
1 September 2025	Elia Giani	Pisa	Union Brescia	Loan
1 September 2025	Alessandro Arena	Pisa	Carrarese	Loan
1 September 2025	(Mali) Woyo Coulibaly	(England) Leicester	Sassuolo	Loan
1 September 2025	Fabrizio Caligara	Sassuolo	Pescara	Loan
1 September 2025	Marco Ballarini	Udinese	Rimini	Loan
1 September 2025	Nicolò Zaniolo	(Turkey) Galatasaray	Udinese	Loan
1 September 2025	(Senegal) Idrissa Gueye	(France) Metz	Udinese	Loan
1 September 2025	(Kosovo) Edon Zhegrova	(France) Lille	Juventus	€14.3M
1 September 2025	Aaron Ciammaglichella	Torino	Juve Stabia	Loan
1 September 2025	Federico Zuccon	Atalanta	Juve Stabia	Loan
1 September 2025	Omar Correia	Triestina	Juve Stabia	Undisclosed
1 September 2025	Alessandro Louati	Juve Stabia	Triestina	Loan
1 September 2025	Francesco D'Amore	Juve Stabia	Triestina	Loan
1 September 2025	(Portugal) Zé Pedro	(Portugal) Porto	Cagliari	Undisclosed
1 September 2025	(Uruguay) Juan Rodríguez	(Uruguay) Peñarol	Cagliari	Undisclosed
1 September 2025	(France) Jonathan Ikoné	Fiorentina	(France) Paris	Undisclosed
1 September 2025	Vincenzo Onofrietti	Bari	(Germany) Schalke 04	Undisclosed
1 September 2025	(Switzerland) Manuel Akanji	(England) Manchester City	Inter	Loan
1 September 2025	(France) Benjamin Pavard	Inter	(France) Marseille	Loan
1 September 2025	(England) Dele Alli	Como	Unattached	Released
1 September 2025	Tommaso Biasci	Catanzaro	Avellino	Undisclosed
1 September 2025	(Belgium) Loïs Openda	(Germany) RB Leipzig	Juventus	Loan
1 September 2025	(Ivory Coast) Maxwel Cornet	(England) West Ham	Genoa	Loan
1 September 2025	Edoardo Olivieri	Modena	Foggia	Loan
1 September 2025	Marco Oliva	Modena	Foggia	Undisclosed
1 September 2025	(Nigeria) Samuel Chukwueze	Milan	(England) Fulham	Loan
1 September 2025	Andrea Belotti	Como	Cagliari	Undisclosed
1 September 2025	(Bosnia and Herzegovina) Dennis Hadžikadunić	(Russia) Rostov	Sampdoria	Loan
1 September 2025	(Chile) Alexis Sánchez	Udinese	(Spain) Sevilla	Free
1 September 2025	(Uruguay) Facundo González	Juventus	(Spain) Racing Santander	Loan
1 September 2025	(Argentina) Lucas Beltrán	Fiorentina	(Spain) Valencia	Loan
1 September 2025	(Argentina) Mateo Scheffer Bracco	Carrarese	Torres	Loan
1 September 2025	Damiano Cancellieri	Avellino	Siracusa	Loan
1 September 2025	Michele Rocca	Avellino	Lumezzane	Undisclosed
1 September 2025	(Brazil) Diego Carlos	(Turkey) Fenerbahçe	Como	Loan
1 September 2025	(England) Jamie Vardy	Unattached	Cremonese	Free
1 September 2025	(United States) Benjamin Cremaschi	(United States) Inter Miami	Parma	Loan
1 September 2025	(Brazil) Lorran	(Brazil) Flamengo	Pisa	Loan
2 September 2025	(Spain) Raúl Albiol	Unattached	Pisa	Free
2 September 2025	(Croatia) Antonio Čolak	Spezia	(Poland) Legia Warsaw	Free
2 September 2025	(Sweden) Jesper Karlsson	Bologna	(Scotland) Aberdeen	Loan
2 September 2025	(Serbia) Stefan Mitrović	Verona	(Netherlands) Excelsior	Loan
2 September 2025	(Poland) Kacper Urbański	Bologna	(Poland) Legia Warsaw	Loan
2 September 2025	(Romania) Adrian Rus	Pisa	(Romania) U Craiova	Free
2 September 2025	Edoardo Duca	Unattached	Juve Stabia	Free
2 September 2025	Matteo Pisseri	Unattached	Frosinone	Free
5 September 2025	(Algeria) Ismaël Bennacer	Milan	(Croatia) Dinamo Zagreb	Loan
5 September 2025	(Ivory Coast) Ange N'Guessan	Torino	(Czech Republic) Slovan Liberec	Undisclosed (Note: The player already played for his new club in the 2025–26 season, the deal turned from temporary to definitive.)
6 September 2025	(Ivory Coast) Jean-Daniel Akpa-Akpro	Unattached	Verona	Free
6 September 2025	Michele Avella	Unattached	Palermo	Free
7 September 2025	(Slovenia) David Pejičić	Udinese	(Slovenia) Maribor	Loan
8 September 2025	(Tunisia) Anas Haj Mohamed	Parma	(Belgium) Beerschot	Undisclosed
8 September 2025	(Republic of the Congo) Gabriel Charpentier	Parma	(Poland) Cracovia	Undisclosed
8 September 2025	(Hungary) Botond Balogh	Parma	(Turkey) Kocaelispor	Loan
8 September 2025	Emanuel Vignato	Pisa	(Greece) Larissa	Loan
8 September 2025	(Poland) Mateusz Skoczylas	Milan	(Poland) Cracovia	Undisclosed
8 September 2025	(Belgium) Hemsley Akpa-Chukwu	Bari	(Belgium) Seraing	Free
8 September 2025	(Netherlands) Daishawn Redan	Avellino	(Belgium) Lokeren	Loan
9 September 2025	(Serbia) Mihajlo Ilić	Bologna	(Belgium) Anderlecht	Loan
9 September 2025	(Mali) Coli Saco	Napoli	(Switzerland) Yverdon	Loan
10 September 2025	(Netherlands) Vernon Addo	Lecce	(Cyprus) Krasava ENY	Loan
10 September 2025	Riccardo Capellini	Unattached	Pescara	Free
11 September 2025	(France) Yacine Adli	Milan	(Saudi Arabia) Al Shabab	Undisclosed
12 September 2025	Roberto Gagliardini	Unattached	Verona	Free
