= 2025–26 Spezia Calcio season =

Spezia Calcio FC season

Spezia Calcio
2025–26 season
- Manager: Luca D'Angelo
- Stadium: Stadio Alberto Picco
- Serie B: 16th
- Coppa Italia: Second round
- Biggest defeat: Spezia 1–3 Juve Stabia

The 2025–26 season is the 120th in the history of Spezia Calcio and the club's third consecutive season in Serie B. In addition to its league participation, the team is also competing in the Coppa Italia. The season began on 18 August 2025.

== Squad ==
=== Transfers In ===
Pos.	Player	Transferred from	Fee	Date	Source
FW	(Italy) Riccardo Di Giorgio	(Italy) Sestri Levante	Loan return	30 June 2025	
DF	(Albania) Christian Cugnata	(Italy) Pro Vercelli	Loan return	30 June 2025	
MF	(Italy) Giovanni Corradini	(Italy) Ternana	Loan return	30 June 2025	
GK	(Italy) Gian Marco Crespi	(Italy) Caldiero Terme	Loan return	30 June 2025	
DF	(Portugal) João Moutinho	(Poland) Jagiellonia Białystok	Loan return	30 June 2025	
GK	(Senegal) Mouhamadou Sarr	(Italy) Cremonese	Undisclosed	1 July 2025	
FW	(Serbia) Vanja Vlahović	(Italy) Atalanta U23	Loan	15 July 2025	
MF	(Italy) Christian Comotto	(Italy) Milan	Loan	8 August 2025	
MF	(Italy) Rachid Kouda	(Italy) Parma	Loan	11 August 2025	
DF	(Italy) Antonio Candela	(Italy) Venezia	Loan	16 August 2025	
GK	(Italy) Leonardo Loria	(Italy) Pisa	Loan	22 August 2025	
MF	(Italy) Pietro Beruatto	(Italy) Pisa	Loan	28 August 2025	
DF	(Italy) Fellipe Jack	(Italy) Como	Loan	1 September 2025	

=== Transfers Out ===
Pos.	Player	Transferred to	Fee	Date	Source
MF	(Denmark) Julius Beck	(Denmark) Esbjerg fB	Undisclosed	1 July 2025	
GK	(Argentina) Leandro Chichizola	(Italy) Modena	Undisclosed	1 July 2025	
DF	(Italy) Nicolò Bertola	(Italy) Udinese	End of contract	1 July 2025	
DF	(Portugal) João Moutinho	(Poland) Lech Poznań	€500,000	16 July 2025	
FW	(Italy) Mirko Antonucci	(Italy) Bari	Loan	21 August 2025	
GK	(Italy) Gian Marco Crespi	(Greece) Athens Kallithea F.C.	Undisclosed	25 August 2025	
MF	(Italy) Halid Djankpata	(Italy) Gubbio	Loan	26 August 2025	
GK	(Italy) Matteo Leonardo	(Italy) Scafatese	Loan	27 August 2025	
MF	(Italy) Giovanni Corradini	(Italy) Ascoli	€400,000	28 August 2025	
DF	(Italy) Simone Giorgeschi	(Italy) Alcione Milano	Loan	1 September 2025	
FW	(Croatia) Antonio Čolak	(Poland) Legia Warsaw	Contract terminated	1 September 2025	
DF	(Albania) Christian Cugnata	(Italy) Folgore Caratese	Contract terminated	1 September 2025	
FW	(Italy) Riccardo Di Giorgio	(Romania) Sănătatea Cluj	Undisclosed	12 September 2025	

== Friendlies ==
27 July 2025	Spezia	1–2	Lecce

30 July 2025	Spezia	2–2	Cittadella

7 August 2025	Spezia	2–0	Viareggio 2014

10 August 2025	Spezia	2–1	Sestri Levante

== Competitions ==
=== Overall record ===
Competition	First match	Last match	Starting round	Record							
Competition	First match	Last match	Starting round	Pld	W	D	L	GF	GA	GD	Win %
Serie B	24 August 2025	9 May 2026	Matchday 1	4	0	2	2	2	6	−4	0.00
Coppa Italia	18 August 2025		First round	1	0	1	0	1	1	+0	0.00
Total				5	0	3	2	3	7	−4	0.00

Last updated: 20 September 2025
Source: Competitions

=== Serie B ===
==== League table ====
Pos	Team	Pld	W	D	L	GF	GA	GD	Pts	Promotion, qualification or relegation
16	Südtirol (O)	38	8	17	13	38	48	−10	41	Qualification for relegation play-out
17	Bari (R)	38	10	10	18	38	60	−22	40	Qualification for relegation play-out
18	Reggiana (R)	38	9	10	19	36	56	−20	37	Relegation to Serie C
19	Spezia (R)	38	8	11	19	43	59	−16	35 (Note: Spezia finished ahead of Pescara on head-to-head points: Spezia 2–1 Pescara, Pescara 1–1 Spezia.)	Relegation to Serie C
20	Pescara (R)	38	7	14	17	51	66	−15	35	Relegation to Serie C

Source: Serie BKT
Rules for classification: 1) Points; 2) Head-to-head points; 3) Head-to-head goal difference; 4) Goal difference; 5) Goals scored; 6) Draw.
(Note: Head-to-head record is used only after all the matches between the teams in question have been played)
(O) Play-off winners; (R) Relegated

==== Results summary ====
Overall								Home						Away					
Pld	W	D	L	GF	GA	GD	Pts	W	D	L	GF	GA	GD	W	D	L	GF	GA	GD
38	8	11	19	43	59	−16	35	5	6	8	23	26	−3	3	5	11	20	33	−13

==== Results by round ====
Round	1	2	3	4
Ground	H	H	A	H
Result	L	D	D	L
Position	18	18	16	

Updated to match(es) played on 20 September 2025. Source:
A = Away; H = Home; W = Win; D = Draw; L = Loss

==== Matches ====
24 August 2025 1	Spezia	0–2	Carrarese	La Spezia
18:00 UTC+2	Hristov (yellow card) 5'; Kouda (red card) 44'; Esposito (yellow card) 45'; Matějů (yellow card) 68'; Comotto (yellow card) 82'; Di Serio (yellow card) 90+1'		Illanes (yellow card) 31'; Schiavi 45' (pen.), 71'; Ruggeri (yellow card) 45+2'	Stadium: Stadio Alberto Picco; Attendance: 10,503; Referee: Luca Pairetto

30 August 2025 2	Spezia	0–0	Catanzaro	La Spezia
20:00 UTC+2	Esposito (yellow card) 1'; Candelari (yellow card) 48'; Matějů (yellow card) 81'		Cissè (yellow card) 6'; Frosinini (yellow card) 81'; Pittarello (yellow card) 90+5'	Stadium: Stadio Alberto Picco; Attendance: 9,345; Referee: Antonio Rapuano

14 September 2025 3	Empoli	1–1	Spezia	Empoli
18:30 UTC+2	Yepes (yellow card) 17'; Popov 49'; Elia (yellow card) 62'; Ilie (yellow card) 89'		Esposito 18' (pen.); Cassata (yellow card) 43'; Nagy (yellow card) 89'	Stadium: Stadio Carlo Castellani; Attendance: 6,960; Referee: Ermanno Feliciani

20 September 2025 4	Spezia	1–3	Juve Stabia	La Spezia
14:00 UTC+2	Soleri 59'		Correia 2', (yellow card) 64'; Carissoni 19'; Pierobon (yellow card) 45'; Candellone 61'; Ruggero (yellow card) 79'	Stadium: Stadio Alberto Picco; Attendance: 8,488; Referee: Luca Massimi

27 September 2025 5	Venezia	2–0	Spezia	Venice
15:00 UTC+2	Pérez (yellow card) 9'; Adorante 29' (pen.); Korać 54'		Vignali (red card) 8'; Hristov (yellow card) 66'; Cassata (yellow card) 89'	Stadium: Pier Luigi Penzo; Attendance: 7,126; Referee: Michael Fabbri

30 September 2025 6	Reggiana	1–1	Spezia	La Spezia
20:30 UTC+2	Girma 61', (yellow card) 90+3'; Portanova (yellow card) 74'; Reinhart (yellow card) 78'; Tavşan (yellow card) 84'; Libutti (yellow card) 87'		Lapadula 26'; Hristov (red card) 52'; Cistana (yellow card) 53'	Stadium: Stadio Alberto Picco; Attendance: 8,796; Referee: Andrea Zanotti

4 October 2025 7	Spezia	1–2	Palermo	La Spezia
17:15 UTC+2	Matějů (yellow card) 29'; Giovane 89' (o.g.)		Diakité (yellow card) 33'; Pohjanpalo 42'; Pierozzi 58'; Blin (yellow card) 66'; Veroli (yellow card) 73'	Stadium: Stadio Alberto Picco; Attendance: 9,392; Referee: Matteo Marcenaro

18 October 2025 8	Spezia	1–2	Cesena	La Spezia
19:30 UTC+2	Lapadula 4'; Esposito (yellow card) 90+5'		Francesconi (yellow card) 17'; Frabotta 38', 45+1'; Castagnetti (yellow card) 48'; Klinsmann (yellow card) 77'; Mangraviti (yellow card) 79'	Stadium: Stadio Alberto Picco; Attendance: 8,369; Referee: Andrea Calzavara

25 October 2025 9	Avellino	0–4	Spezia	Avellino
15:00 UTC+2	Palmiero (red card) 44'; Besaggio (yellow card) 46'; Šimić (yellow card) 81'		Cassata (yellow card) 17'; Aurelio 63'; Vlahović 82'; Vignali 85'; Di Serio 90'	Stadium: Stadio Partenio-Adriano Lombardi; Attendance: 9,306; Referee: Daniele Perenzoni

29 October 2025 10	Spezia	1–1	Padova	La Spezia
20:30 UTC+2	Lapadula 17'; Nagy (yellow card) 71'		Belli (yellow card) 8'; Fusi (yellow card) 30'; Perrotta (yellow card) 59'; Lasagna 66'; Barreca (yellow card) 83'; Varas (yellow card) 90+4'; Harder (yellow card) 90+4'	Stadium: Stadio Alberto Picco; Attendance: 8,143; Referee: Ivano Pezzuto

2 November 2025 11	Monza	1–0	Spezia	Monza
17:15 UTC+2	Ciurria (yellow card) 18'; Ravanelli 53'; Izzo (yellow card) 75' (red card) 85'		Lapadula (yellow card) 53'; Jack (yellow card) 79'	Stadium: Stadio Brianteo; Attendance: 4,962; Referee: Federico La Penna

7 November 2025 12	Spezia	1–1	Bari	La Spezia
20:30 UTC+2	Kouda 36', (yellow card) 36' (red card) 42'; Candela (yellow card) 90'; Cassata (yellow card) 90+8'		Gytkjær 7'; Nikolaou (yellow card) 47'; Pucino (yellow card) 79'	Stadium: Stadio Alberto Picco; Attendance: 8,836; Referee: Andrea Calzavara

23 November 2025 13	Mantova	4–1	Spezia	Mantua
15:00 UTC+2	Ruocco 33'; Cella (yellow card) 53', (goal) 58'; Marras 81', 90+1'; Bani (yellow card) 87'		Aurelio 4'; Cassata (yellow card) 10' (red card) 90+3'; Di Serio (yellow card) 21'; Wiśniewski (yellow card) 33'; Bandinelli (yellow card) 84'	Stadium: Stadio Danilo Martelli; Attendance: 7,901; Referee: Federico Dionisi

30 November 2025 14	Spezia	1–0	Sampdoria	La Spezia
17:15 UTC+2	Bandinelli (yellow card) 31'; Artistico 51'; Beruatto (yellow card) 83'		Benedetti (yellow card) 7'; Pafundi (yellow card) 22'; Vulikić (yellow card) 64'	Stadium: Stadio Alberto Picco; Attendance: 8,774; Referee: Daniele Chiffi

8 December 2025 15	Virtus Entella	0–1	Spezia	Chiavari
19:30 UTC+2	Parodi (yellow card) 5' (red card) 58'; Guiu (yellow card) 25'; Mezzoni (yellow card) 90+6'		Beruatto (yellow card) 16'; Wiśniewski (yellow card) 52'; Cassata (yellow card) 85'; Artistico 88', (yellow card) 89'	Stadium: Stadio Comunale; Attendance: 4,058; Referee: Andrea Colombo

13 December 2025 16	Spezia	0–2	Modena	La Spezia
15:00 UTC+2	Jack (yellow card) 25' (red card) 68'; Bandinelli (yellow card) 72'; Esposito (yellow card) 90+8'		Nieling 5'; Pyyhtiä (yellow card) 37'; Massolin (yellow card) 60'; Gliozzi 90'; Tonoli (yellow card) 90+2'; Zampano (yellow card) 90+5'; Magnino (yellow card) 90+8'	Stadium: Stadio Alberto Picco; Attendance: 8,394; Referee: Mario Perri

20 December 2025 17	Frosinone	2–1	Spezia	Frosinone
15:00 UTC+2	Bracaglia 16', (yellow card) 49'; Raimondo (yellow card) 36'; Ghedjemis 73'		Di Serio (yellow card) 75'; Esposito (yellow card) 90+1'; Beruatto 90+3'	Stadium: Stadio Benito Stirpe; Attendance: 10,119; Referee: Marco Piccinini

27 December 2025 18	Spezia	2–1	Pescara	La Spezia
12:30 UTC+2	Di Serio 8'; Kouda (yellow card) 20'; Artistico 90+2'		Capellini (yellow card) 23'; Dagasso 45+7'; Valzania (yellow card) 56'; Caligara (yellow card) 90+7'	Stadium: Stadio Alberto Picco; Referee: Andrea Zanotti

10 January 2026 19	Südtirol	2–1	Spezia	Bolzano
15:00 UTC+2	Pecorino 34'; Kofler 51'; Merkaj (yellow card) 80'		Vignali (yellow card) 28'; Vlahović 31'; Adamo (yellow card) 87'	Stadium: Stadio Druso; Attendance: 3,990; Referee: Gianluca Manganiello

18 January 2026 20	Palermo	1–0	Spezia	Palermo
17:15 UTC+2	Segre 1'; Gyasi (yellow card) 40'; Bereszyński (yellow card) 54'		Matějů (yellow card) 17'; Sernicola (yellow card) 49'; Soleri (yellow card) 59'	Stadium: Stadio Renzo Barbera; Attendance: 24,745; Referee: Luca Massimi

24 January 2026 21	Spezia	1–0	Avellino	La Spezia
19:30 UTC+2	Matějů (yellow card) 2'; Artistico 26'; Romano (yellow card) 32'; Cassata (yellow card) 64'		Šimić (yellow card) 8'; Fontanarosa (yellow card) 36'; Palumbo (yellow card) 56'; Sala (yellow card) 89'	Stadium: Stadio Alberto Picco; Attendance: 8,712; Referee: Paride Tremolada

31 January 2026 22	Sampdoria	1–0	Spezia	Genoa
19:30 UTC+2	Henderson (yellow card) 35'; Hadžikadunić (yellow card) 47'; Palma (red card) 85'; Ricci 90', (yellow card) 90+1'		Cassata (yellow card) 30'; Artistico (yellow card) 34'; Valoti (yellow card) 38'; Hristov (yellow card) 50'; Vlahović (red card) 85'	Stadium: Stadio Luigi Ferraris; Attendance: 23,112; Referee: Marco Di Bello

7 February 2026 23	Spezia	1–1	Virtus Entella	La Spezia
19:30 UTC+2	Artistico 18'; Cassata (yellow card) 24'; Beruatto (yellow card) 60'		Marconi (yellow card) 2'; Squizzato (yellow card) 24'; Cuppone 30'; Guiu (red card) 32'; Vecchia (yellow card) 78'	Stadium: Stadio Alberto Picco; Attendance: 8,216; Referee: Giovanni Ayroldi

11 February 2026 24	Bari	0–0	Spezia	Bari
20:00 UTC+2			Bonfanti (yellow card) 8'	Stadium: Stadio San Nicola; Attendance: 9,617; Referee: Daniele Doveri

15 February 2026 25	Spezia	0–2	Frosinone	La Spezia
15:00 UTC+2	Romano (yellow card) 36'; Ruggero (yellow card) 45+3'; Adamo (yellow card) 77'; Comotto (yellow card) 86'		Calò (yellow card) 32'; Kvernadze 37'; Ghedjemis 55'; Kone (yellow card) 87'	Stadium: Stadio Alberto Picco; Attendance: 8,216; Referee: Federico Dionisi

21 February 2026 26	Cesena	2–3	Spezia	Cesena
17:15 UTC+2	Shpendi 4'; Mangraviti (yellow card) 23'; Berti 53'		Bellemo (yellow card) 15'; Artistico 17', 75'; Skjellerup (yellow card) 57'; Aurelio 67'	Stadium: Stadio Dino Manuzzi; Attendance: 9,885; Referee: Davide Di Marco

28 February 2026 27	Spezia	0–1	Reggiana	La Spezia
17:15 UTC+2	Matějů (yellow card) 10'; Bellemo (yellow card) 29'; Vignali (yellow card) 74'; Bandinelli (yellow card) 90+4'		Novakovich 40'; Lusuardi (yellow card) 45+1'; Bertagnoli (yellow card) 74'; Girma (yellow card) 87'	Stadium: Stadio Alberto Picco; Attendance: 8,565; Referee: Luca Zufferli

3 March 2026 28	Padova	2–2	Spezia	Padua
19:00 UTC+2	Sgarbi 39'; Lasagna 78'		Aurelio (yellow card) 14'; Artistico 24'; Ruggero (yellow card) 50'; Bonfanti 82'	Stadium: Stadio Euganeo; Attendance: 6,733; Referee: Mario Perri

7 March 2026 29	Spezia	4–2	Monza	La Spezia
15:00 UTC+2	Artistico 20', 90+3', (yellow card) 63'; Aurelio 34', (yellow card) 38'; Sernicola (yellow card) 45+1'; Bandinelli 57'		Petagna 9'; Carboni (yellow card) 10' (red card) 32'; Cutrone 16'; Lucchesi (yellow card) 72'	Stadium: Stadio Alberto Picco; Attendance: 8,473; Referee: Fabio Maresca

13 March 2026 30	Modena	3–0	Spezia	Modena
20:30 UTC+2	De Luca 29', 55'; Gliozzi 59'		Bellemo (yellow card) 51'; Beruatto (yellow card) 53'	Stadium: Stadio Alberto Braglia; Attendance: 9,412; Referee: Niccolò Turrini

17 March 2026 31	Spezia	1–1	Empoli	La Spezia
20:00 UTC+2	Bandinelli (yellow card) 38'; Artistico 69'		Nasti (yellow card) 40'; Lovato (yellow card) 51'; Candela (yellow card) 65'; Haas (yellow card) 75'; Degli Innocenti (yellow card) 79'; Saporiti 90+6' (pen.)	Stadium: Stadio Alberto Picco; Attendance: 8,749; Referee: Luca Massimi

21 March 2026 32	Juve Stabia	3–1	Spezia	Castellammare di Stabia
15:00 UTC+2	Leone 45+2' (pen.); Pierobon 74'; Okoro 89'		Aurelio 32'; Beruatto (yellow card) 37'; Bonfanti (yellow card) 52'; Adamo (yellow card) 56'; Hristov (yellow card) 90+6'	Stadium: Stadio Romeo Menti; Attendance: 3,403; Referee: Davide Di Marco

6 April 2026 33	Carrarese	3–1	Spezia	Carrara
18:30 UTC+2	Calabrese 17'; Finotto 23', (yellow card) 59'; Abiuso (penalty missed) 27', 63'; Belloni (red card) 90'		Bonfanti (yellow card) 16' (red card) 90+2'; Matějů (yellow card) 45+2'; Valoti 49', (red card) 85'; Vignali (yellow card) 69'; Adamo (red card) 90'; Comotto (yellow card) 90+6'	Stadium: Stadio dei Marmi; Attendance: 5,062; Referee: Gianluca Manganiello

12 April 2026 34	Spezia	0–2	Mantova	La Spezia
16:15 UTC+2	Romano (yellow card) 13'; Bandinelli (yellow card) 49'		Dembélé (yellow card) 28'; Bragantini 32'; Trimboli (yellow card) 45+3'; Buso 72'; Kouda (yellow card) 79'	Stadium: Stadio Alberto Picco; Attendance: 9,258; Referee: Juan Lucca Sacchi

18 April 2026 35	Spezia	6–1	Südtirol	La Spezia
15:00 UTC+2	Valoti 8' (pen.); Di Serio 25'; Beruatto 33'; Lapadula 70'; Sernicola 73'; Aurelio 82'		Pecorino 20'; Zedadka (red card) 23'; Merkaj (yellow card) 30'	Stadium: Stadio Alberto Picco; Attendance: 8,263; Referee: Rosario Abisso

25 April 2026 36	Catanzaro	4–2	Spezia	Catanzaro
11:30 UTC+2	Petriccione 24', (yellow card) 66'; Fellipe Jack 63'; Pittarello 78', 82'		Valoti 44', (yellow card) 80'; Di Serio (yellow card) 45'; Hristov (yellow card) 75'; Lapadula 90+3' (pen.)	Stadium: Stadio Nicola Ceravolo; Referee: Marco Piccinini

1 May 2026 37	Spezia	2–2	Venezia	La Spezia
14:00 UTC+2	Valoti (yellow card) 5', (goal) 73'; Vignali (yellow card) 43'; Bandinelli (red card) 45+2'; Artistico 90'; Nagy (yellow card) 90+2'		Yeboah 7'; Adorante (yellow card) 14'; Sagrado 70'; Busio (yellow card) 87'	Stadium: Stadio Alberto Picco; Attendance: 4,328; Referee: Andrea Colombo

8 May 2026 38	Pescara	2–2	Spezia	Pescara
19:30 UTC+2	Faraoni 10'; Letizia (yellow card) 41'		Vignali (yellow card) 33'; Romano (yellow card) 70'; Artistico 73'; Nagy (yellow card) 81'	Stadium: Stadio Adriatico – Giovanni Cornacchia; Attendance: 10,994; Referee: Daniele Doveri

=== Coppa Italia ===
18 August 2025 Round of 32	Spezia	1–1 (4–2 p)	Sampdoria	La Spezia
17:30 UTC+2	Artistico 36'		Ferri (yellow card) 6'; Benedetti (yellow card) 14'; Henderson 34'; Conti (yellow card) 85'	Stadium: Stadio Alberto Picco; Attendance: 7,502; Referee: Luca Zufferli
	Penalties
	Soleri (penalty scored); Kouda (penalty scored); Hristov (penalty scored); Esposito (penalty scored)		(penalty missed) Henderson; (penalty scored) Çuni; (penalty scored) Narro; (penalty missed) Pedrola

24 September 2025 Second round	Parma	2–2 (4–3 p)	Spezia	Parma
16:00 UTC+2	Britschgi 26'; Pellegrino 45+1'; Plicco (red card) 76'		Fellipe Jack (yellow card) 36'; Aurelio 44'; Lapadula 82'	Stadium: Stadio Ennio Tardini; Attendance: 3,428; Referee: Giuseppe Mucera
	Penalties
	Cutrone (penalty scored); Ndiaye (penalty scored); Bernabé (penalty scored); Circati (penalty missed); Ordóñez (penalty scored)		(penalty missed) Soleri; (penalty scored) Kouda; (penalty scored) Vlahović; (penalty missed) Lapadula; (penalty scored) Jack
