= Gabriele Artistico =

Italian footballer (born 2002)

Personal information
- Date of birth: 14 July 2002 (age 24)
- Place of birth: Rome, Italy
- Height: 1.88 m (6 ft 2 in)
- Position: Forward

Team information
- Current team: Padova
- Number: 90

Youth career
- 2006–: Kolbe
- Vigor Perconti
- Tor Tre Teste
- Savio
- Bettini
- –2018: Atletico 2000
- 2018–2020: Parma

Senior career*
Years	Team	Apps	(Gls)
2020–2023	Parma	0	(0)
2021–2022	→ Lokomotiva Zagreb (loan)	4	(0)
2022	→ Monterosi (loan)	13	(2)
2022–2023	→ Gubbio (loan)	11	(2)
2023	→ Renate (loan)	11	(1)
2023–2024	Virtus Francavilla	37	(12)
2024–2026	Lazio	0	(0)
2024–2025	→ Juve Stabia (loan)	16	(2)
2025	→ Cosenza (loan)	17	(5)
2025–2026	→ Spezia (loan)	31	(13)
2026–	Padova	0	(0)
- * Club domestic league appearances and goals as of 19 September 2026

Gabriele Artistico (born 4 July 2002) is an Italian professional footballer who plays as a forward for Serie B club Padova.

== Club career ==
Artistico started playing football at the age of four with Kolbe in Rome, later moving to various youth teams of the capital, before joining the youth sector of Parma in 2018.

He made his first team debut with Parma on 28 October 2020, in the third round of the Coppa Italia against Pescara.

In the summer of 2021 Artistico was loaned to HNL side Lokomotiva Zagreb.

In January 2022 Artistico returned to Italy, being loaned to Serie C club Monterosi for the remainder of the season. On 19 February 2022 he scored his first goal among professionals, in a match won 3–0 against Paganese.

In the following season he was loaned to Serie C club Gubbio. In January Artistico moved to Renate on a six-month loan.

In the summer of 2023 Artistico joined Virtus Francavilla on a permanent basis. During the 2023–2024 season he scored 12 goals in 39 appearances; however, the team was relegated to Serie D at the end of the championship.

In the summer of 2024 Artistico was purchased by Serie A club Lazio, which immediately loaned him to Juve Stabia, in Serie B. In January 2025 he was loaned to fellow Serie B side Cosenza.

In the 2025–2026 season he was again loaned in Serie B, this time to Spezia.

== Personal life ==
He is the nephew of former professional football players Edoardo and Mario Artistico.

== Career statistics ==
As of match played 21 March 2026

Appearances and goals by club, season and competition
Club	Season	League			National cup (Note: Includes Coppa Italia)		League cup (Note: Includes Coppa Italia Serie C)		Continental		Other		Total	
Club	Season	Division	Apps	Goals	Apps	Goals	Apps	Goals	Apps	Goals	Apps	Goals	Apps	Goals
Parma	2020–21	Serie A	0	0	1	0	—		—		—		1	0
Lokomotiva Zagreb (loan)	2021–22	HNL	4	0	0	0	—		—		—		4	0
Monterosi (loan)	2021–22	Serie C	13	2	—		—		—		1 (Note: Appearance(s) in Serie C play-offs)	0	14	2
Gubbio (loan)	2022–23	Serie C	11	2	—		2	1	—		—		13	3
Renate (loan)	2022–23	Serie C	11	1	—		—		—		2	0	13	1
Virtus Francavilla	2023–24	Serie C	37	12	—		1	0	—		1 (Note: Appearance in Serie C play-out)	0	39	12
Juve Stabia (loan)	2024–25	Serie B	16	2	1	0	—		—		—		17	2
Cosenza (loan)	2024–25	Serie B	17	5	—		—		—		—		17	5
Spezia (loan)	2025–26	Serie B	27	11	2	1	—		—		—		29	12
Career total			136	35	4	1	3	1	0	0	4	0	147	37
