= 2024–25 SS Juve Stabia season =

SS Juve Stabia
2024–25 season
- Manager: Guido Pagliuca
- Stadium: Stadio Romeo Menti
- Serie B: 5th
- Coppa Italia: Preliminary round
- Top goalscorer: League: Andrea Adorante (15); All: Andrea Adorante (15)
- Biggest win: Juve Stabia 3–0 Cosenza
- Biggest defeat: Juve Stabia 0–3 Spezia

The 2024–25 season marked the return of SS Juve Stabia to Serie B after a four-year absence. The club also took part in the Coppa Italia, exiting the competition in the preliminary round. Throughout the season, Juve Stabia maintained a consistent performance, remaining for the most part within the positions qualifying for the promotion play-offs, ultimately finishing in fifth place.

== Transfers ==
=== In ===
Pos.	Player	Transferred from	Fee	Date	Source
MF	(Italy) Federico Zuccon	(Italy) Atalanta	Loan	23 August 2024	
MF	(Italy) Niccolò Fortini	(Italy) Fiorentina	Loan	30 August 2024	
FW	(Italy) Lorenzo Sgarbi	(Italy) Napoli	Loan	8 January 2025	
DF	(Italy) Francesco D'Amore	(Italy) Legnago Salus	Loan return	16 January 2025	
DF	(Italy) Danilo Quaranta	(Italy) Ascoli	Undisclosed	17 January 2025	
MF	(Slovenia) Elian Demirović	(Italy) Legnago Salus	Loan return	19 January 2025	
DF	(Poland) Patryk Peda	(Italy) Palermo	Loan	25 January 2025	
MF	(Tunisia) Alessandro Louati	(Italy) Pro Vercelli	Loan	3 February 2025	
FW	(Lithuania) Edgaras Dubickas	(Italy) Pisa	Loan	3 February 2025	

=== Out ===
Pos.	Player	Transferred to	Fee	Date	Source
MF	(Slovenia) Elian Demirović	(Italy) Legnago Salus	Loan	2 August 2024	
DF	(Italy) Francesco D'Amore	(Italy) Ascoli	Loan	16 January 2025	
MF	(Slovenia) Elian Demirović	(Italy) Giugliano	Loan	20 January 2025	

== Friendlies ==
28 July 2024	Arezzo (Italy)	1–2	(Italy) Juve Stabia
17:30

== Competitions ==
=== Serie B ===
==== Results summary ====
Overall								Home						Away					
Pld	W	D	L	GF	GA	GD	Pts	W	D	L	GF	GA	GD	W	D	L	GF	GA	GD
38	14	13	11	42	41	+1	55	10	4	5	25	18	+7	4	9	6	17	23	−6

==== Results by round ====
Round	1	2	3	4	5	6	7	8	9	10	11	12	13	14	15	16	17	18	19	20	21	22	23	24	25	26	27	28	29	30	31	32	33	34	35	36	37	38
Ground	A	A	H	A	H	A	H	A	H	A	H	A	H	H	A	H	A	H	A	H	A	A	H	A	H	H	A	H	A	H	A	H	A	H	A	H	A	H
Result	W	D	W	D	L	L	W	W	L	D	D	D	L	D	D	W	W	W	L	D	D	L	W	L	W	W	L	L	D	W	W	W	D	D	L	W	D	L
Position	1	3	3	2	5	13	7	4	5	6	6	6	9	9	9	7	6	4	5	5	5	6	5	7	6	6	6	7	7	6	6	5	5	5	5	5	5	5

A = Away; H = Home; W = Win; D = Draw; L = Loss

==== Matches ====
17 August 2024 1	Bari	1–3	Juve Stabia

25 August 2024 2	Catanzaro	0–0	Juve Stabia

28 August 2024 3	Juve Stabia	1–0	Mantova

1 September 2024 4	Frosinone	0–0	Juve Stabia

14 September 2024 5	Juve Stabia	1–3	Palermo

21 September 2024 6	Modena	3–0	Juve Stabia

29 September 2024 7	Juve Stabia	2–0	Pisa

4 October 2024 8	Sampdoria	1–2	Juve Stabia

20 October 2024 9	Juve Stabia	1–2	Cremonese

26 October 2024 10	Cosenza	1–1	Juve Stabia

29 October 2024 11	Juve Stabia	2–2	Sassuolo

2 November 2024 12	Carrarese	0–0	Juve Stabia

10 November 2024 13	Juve Stabia	0–3	Spezia

23 November 2024 14	Juve Stabia	0–0	Brescia

30 November 2024 15	Cittadella	2–2	Juve Stabia

6 December 2024 16	Juve Stabia	2–1	Südtirol

15 December 2024 17	Salernitana	1–2	Juve Stabia

22 December 2024 18	Juve Stabia	1–0	Cesena

26 December 2024 19	Reggiana	2–1	Juve Stabia

29 December 2024 20	Juve Stabia	1–1	Frosinone

12 January 2025 21	Spezia	1–1	Juve Stabia

19 January 2025 22	Palermo	1–0	Juve Stabia

25 January 2025 23	Juve Stabia	2–1	Carrarese

1 February 2025 24	Sassuolo	2–0	Juve Stabia

9 February 2025 25	Juve Stabia	3–1	Bari

16 February 2025 26	Juve Stabia	3–0	Cosenza

22 February 2025 27	Pisa	3–1	Juve Stabia

1 March 2025 28	Juve Stabia	0–1	Cittadella

8 March 2025 29	Mantova	1–1	Juve Stabia

15 March 2025 30	Juve Stabia	2–1	Modena

30 March 2025 31	Cesena	1–2	Juve Stabia

5 April 2025 32	Juve Stabia	1–0	Salernitana

13 April 2025 33	Cremonese	1–1	Juve Stabia

27 April 2025 35	Südtirol	2–0	Juve Stabia

1 May 2025 36	Juve Stabia	2–0	Catanzaro

4 May 2025 37	Brescia	0–0	Juve Stabia

9 May 2025 38	Juve Stabia	1–2	Reggiana	Castellammare di Stabia
20:30				Stadium: Stadio Romeo Menti

13 May 2025 34	Juve Stabia	0–0	Sampdoria	Castellammare di Stabia
20:30				Stadium: Stadio Romeo Menti
Note: The match had been scheduled to take place on April 21 at 3:00 p.m.; however, it was postponed following the death of Pope Francis.

==== Promotion play-offs ====
17 May 2025	Juve Stabia	1–0	Palermo	Castellammare di Stabia
				Stadium: Stadio Romeo Menti

21 May 2025 First leg	Juve Stabia	2–1	Cremonese	Castellammare di Stabia
20:30				Stadium: Stadio Romeo Menti

25 May 2025 Second leg	Cremonese	v (1–2 agg.)	Juve Stabia	Cremona
17:15

=== Coppa Italia ===
4 August 2024 Preliminary round	Avellino	3–1	Juve Stabia	Avellino
20:45		Report		Stadium: Stadio Partenio-Adriano Lombardi
