= Fellipe Jack =

Italian footballer (born 2005)

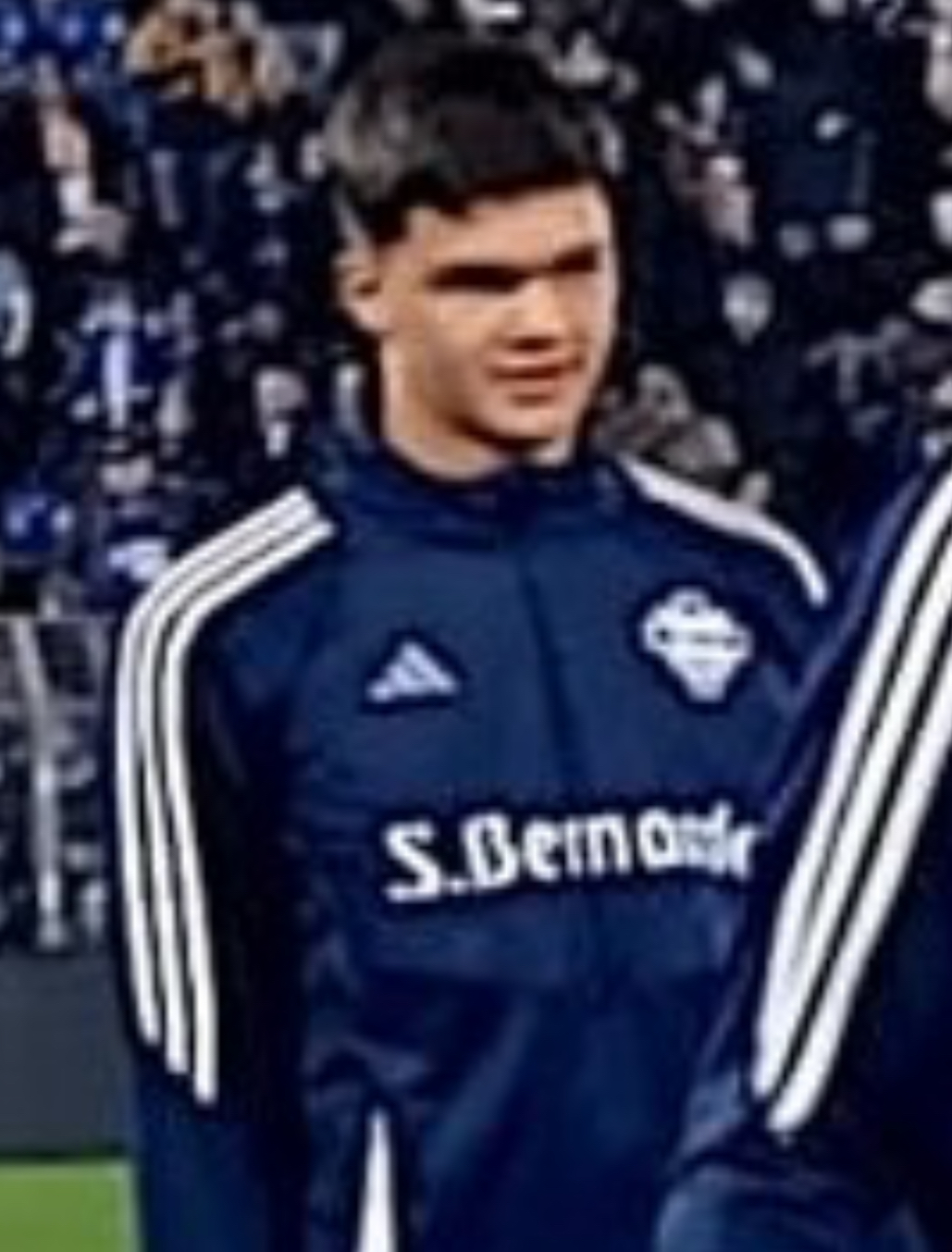
- Fellipe Jack with Como 1907 in 2025

Personal information
- Full name: Fellipe Jack Ozilio Moreira Pacheco
- Date of birth: 12 January 2006 (age 20)
- Place of birth: São Paulo, Brazil
- Height: 1.90 m (6 ft 3 in)
- Position: Centre-back

Team information
- Current team: Cremonese (on loan from Como)
- Number: 13

Youth career
- Portuguesa
- 2016–2024: Palmeiras
- 2024: → Como (loan)

Senior career*
Years	Team	Apps	(Gls)
2024–2025	Palmeiras	0	(0)
2024–2025	→ Como (loan)	7	(0)
2025–	Como	0	(0)
2025–2026	→ Spezia (loan)	7	(0)
2026	→ Catanzaro (loan)	4	(1)
2026–	→ Cremonese (loan)	0	(0)

International career^{‡}
2022	Brazil U17	2	(0)
2025	Italy U19	1	(0)
2025–	Italy U20	1	(0)
- * Club domestic league appearances and goals as of 10 May 2026 ‡ National team caps and goals as of 5 September 2025

Fellipe Jack Ozilio Moreira Pacheco, known as Fellipe Jack (born 12 January 2006) is a professional footballer who plays as a centre-back for Serie B club Cremonese, on loan from Como. Born in Brazil, he is a youth international for Italy.

== Club career ==
Fellipe Jack played for the academies of Vila Santista FC and Portuguesa, before moving to the youth sides of Palmeiras at the age of 10. On 1 October 2022, he signed his first professional contract with Palmeiras until 2025. He helped the Palmeiras U17s win two Copa do Brasil Sub-17s, two Campeonato Brasileiro Sub-17s, and one Campeonato Paulista Sub-17 between 2022 and 2023.

On 2 February 2024, Fellipe Jack moved to Italy and joined Serie B club Como on loan for the remainder of the 2023–24 season and was assigned to their youth side. On 10 July 2024, he extended his loan with Como for the 2024–25 season, with an option to purchase for €2m for 60% of his rights. He made his senior and professional debut with Como as a substitute in a 2–0 Serie A loss to Fiorentina on 24 November 2024.

In the summer of 2025, Como exercised their option to make the transfer permanent and signed a contract with Fellipe Jack until June 2028. On 1 September 2025, Fellipe Jack was loaned to Spezia in Serie B. On 2 February 2026, he moved on a new loan to Catanzaro, also in Serie B.

On 14 July 2026, Fellipe Jack was loaned to Cremonese, with an option to buy.

== International career ==
Born in Brazil, Fellipe Jack is of Italian descent and holds dual-citizenship. He played for the Brazil U17s at the 2022 Montaigu Tournament, which they ended up winning.

On 21 February 2025, Fellipe was selected by coach Alberto Bollini within Italy U19 squad for a training stage.

== Career statistics ==
As of match played 13 December 2025

Appearances and goals by club, season and competition
Club	Season	League			State League		National cup (Note: Includes Copa do Brasil, Coppa Italia)		Continental		Other		Total	
Club	Season	Division	Apps	Goals	Apps	Goals	Apps	Goals	Apps	Goals	Apps	Goals	Apps	Goals
Palmeiras	2024	Série A	0	0	0	0	0	0	0	0	0	0	0	0
Como (loan)	2024–25	Serie A	7	0	—		0	0	—		—		7	0
Spezia (loan)	2025–26	Serie B	7	0	—		1	0	—		—		8	0
Career total			14	0	0	0	1	0	0	0	0	0	15	0

== Honours ==
Brazil U17

- Montaigu Tournament: 2022
