= Halid Djankpata =

Italian footballer (born 2005)

Personal information
- Date of birth: 13 April 2005 (age 21)
- Place of birth: Lomé, Togo
- Height: 1.86 m (6 ft 1 in)
- Position: Midfielder

Team information
- Current team: Barletta
- Number: 82

Youth career
- 2017–2024: Everton

Senior career*
Years	Team	Apps	(Gls)
2024–2026	Spezia	0	(0)
2025–2026	→ Gubbio (loan)	27	(1)
2026–	Barletta	0	(0)

International career^{‡}
2024	Italy U19	1	(0)
- * Club domestic league appearances and goals as of 28 August 2026 ‡ National team caps and goals as of 14 February 2024

Halid Djankpata (born 13 April 2005) is a professional footballer who plays as a midfielder for Serie C Group C club Barletta. Born in Togo, he represented Italy internationally at the youth level, before switching allegiance back to Togo for the senior team.

== Early life ==
Djankpata was born in 2005 in Togo to Beninese parents from Bassila, Benin, before moving to Italy with his family in 2006.

== Club career ==
As a youth player, Djankpata joined the youth academy of English Premier League side Everton after trialing with the youth academy of English side Manchester City.

On 30 August 2024, he signed a 3-years deal for Italian Serie B club Spezia.

On 26 August 2025, Djankpata was loaned by Serie C club Gubbio.

== International career ==
Born in Togo, the midfielder received offers from both the Togo and Benin national teams, rejecting both in order to remain eligible for Italy. He received his first call-up to the Azzurri's Under-19 friendly with Austria on 14 February 2024.

In March 2026, Djankpata was called up to the Togo national team for a friendly against Niger, but remained on the bench on that occasion.

== Style of play ==
Djankpata mainly operates as a central midfielder.

== Personal life ==
Djankpata is the son of Awaly Djankpata and Karamatou Gbadamassi.

== Career statistics ==
=== Club ===
As of match played 4 March 2026

Appearances and goals by club, season and competition
Club	Season	League			Coppa Italia		Other		Total	
Club	Season	Division	Apps	Goals	Apps	Goals	Apps	Goals	Apps	Goals
Everton U21	2022–23	—			—		2 (Note: Appearance(s) in EFL Trophy)	0	2	0
Everton U21	2023–24	—			—		3	0	3	0
Everton U21	Total		—		—		5	0	5	0
Spezia	2025–26	Serie B	0	0	0	0	—		0	0
Gubbio (loan)	2025–26	Serie C	23	1	—		—		23	1
Career total			23	1	0	0	5	0	28	1
