= Giovanni Bonfanti =

Italian footballer (born 2003)

Personal information
- Date of birth: 17 January 2003 (age 23)
- Place of birth: Milan, Italy
- Height: 1.88 m (6 ft 2 in)
- Position: Centre-back

Team information
- Current team: Las Palmas (on loan from Atalanta)
- Number: 21

Youth career
- 2015–2022: Atalanta
- 2021–2022: → Sampdoria (loan)

Senior career*
Years	Team	Apps	(Gls)
2022–	Atalanta	2	(0)
2022–2023	→ Pontedera (loan)	21	(0)
2023–2024	Atalanta U23	23	(2)
2024–2025	→ Pisa (loan)	22	(0)
2025–2026	→ Pisa (loan)	9	(0)
2026	→ Spezia (loan)	12	(1)
2026–	→ Las Palmas (loan)	0	(0)

International career^{‡}
2023–2024	Italy U20	4	(0)
2024	Italy U21	4	(0)
- * Club domestic league appearances and goals as of 13 May 2026 ‡ National team caps and goals as of 15 October 2024

Giovanni Bonfanti (born 17 January 2003) is an Italian professional footballer who plays as a centre-back for Segunda División club Las Palmas, on loan from Serie A club Atalanta.

== Club career ==
Born in Milan, Bonfanti joined the academy of Atalanta in 2015, aged 12, and subsequently came through the club's youth ranks; in the summer of 2021, he was sent on loan to Sampdoria, where he played for the under-19 squad, while receiving his first call-ups to the first team, under head coach Marco Giampaolo.

On 14 July 2022, Bonfanti joined Serie C side Pontedera on loan until the end of the campaign. The defender made a total amount of 23 appearances (split between the league and the Coppa Italia Serie C) for the club throughout his first professional season.

Having returned to Atalanta in the summer of 2023, Bonfanti started training with the first team during the pre-season, under manager Gian Piero Gasperini; at the start of the league campaign, he was initially assigned to the club's newly-formed reserve team, Atalanta Under-23. On 3 September 2023, he started in the Under-23 team's first official match, a 3–2 league loss to Virtus Verona. After establishing himself as a regular starter for the reserve team, the defender made his Serie A debut on 25 November, coming on as a substitute for Sead Kolašinac in the 76th minute of a 2–1 league defeat to Napoli. On 14 December, he made his debut in a European competition, starting and scoring his first professional goal in a 4–0 UEFA Europa League win over Raków Częstochowa in the group stage.

On 9 August 2024, Bonfanti joined Serie B club Pisa on a season-long loan. After returning to Atalanta and remaining on the bench in the first two 2025–26 Serie A games, on 1 September 2025 he returned to Pisa on a new loan, with an option to buy and a conditional obligation to buy.

On 28 January 2026, after returning from Pisa, Bonfati was loaned again, this time to Serie B club Spezia. On 10 August, he moved abroad and agreed to a one-year loan deal with Segunda División side Las Palmas.

== International career ==
Bonfanti is a youth international for Italy, having played for the under-16 and under-20 national teams.

== Career statistics ==
=== Club ===
As of match played 29 January 2026

Appearances and goals by club, season and competition
Club	Season	League			Coppa Italia		Europe		Other		Total	
Club	Season	Division	Apps	Goals	Apps	Goals	Apps	Goals	Apps	Goals	Apps	Goals
Atalanta	2022–23	Serie A	0	0	0	0	—		—		0	0
Atalanta	2023–24	Serie A	2	0	0	0	1 (Note: Appearance(s) in UEFA Europa League)	1	—		3	1
Atalanta	Total		2	0	0	0	1	1	0	0	3	1
Sampdoria (loan)	2021–22	Serie A	0	0	0	0	0	0	—		0	0
Pontedera (loan)	2022–23	Serie C	21	0	—		—		2 (Note: Appearance(s) in Coppa Italia Serie C)	0	23	0
Atalanta U23	2023–24	Serie C	23	2	—		—		0	0	23	2
Pisa	2024–25	Serie B	22	0	1	0	—		0	0	23	0
Pisa	2025–26	Serie A	9	0	1	0	—		0	0	10	0
Pisa	Total		31	0	2	0	0	0	0	0	33	0
Spezia	2025–26	Serie B	0	0	0	0	—		0	0	0	0
Career total			77	2	2	0	1	1	2	0	82	3
