= Sascha Britschgi =

Swiss footballer (born 2006

Personal information
- Date of birth: 27 August 2006 (age 20)
- Place of birth: Lucerne, Switzerland
- Height: 1.82 m (6 ft 0 in)
- Position: Right-back

Team information
- Current team: Parma
- Number: 27

Youth career
- –2018: FC Kickers Luzern
- 2018–2024: Luzern

Senior career*
Years	Team	Apps	(Gls)
2024–2025	Luzern II	22	(3)
2024–2025	Luzern	3	(0)
2025–	Parma	29	(0)

International career^{‡}
2021	Switzerland U16	1	(0)
2024	Switzerland U19	2	(0)
2025	Switzerland U20	1	(0)
2025–	Switzerland U21	6	(0)
2026–	Switzerland	5	(0)
- * Club domestic league appearances and goals as of 25 May 2026 ‡ National team caps and goals as of 13 November 2026

Sascha Britschgi (born 27 August 2006) is a Swiss professional footballer who plays as a right-back for Serie A club Parma and the Switzerland national team.

== Early life ==
Born in Switzerland, he is a native of Lucerne, Switzerland. He was born to a Swiss father and a Cameroonian mother.

== Club career ==
As a youth player, Britschgi joined the youth academy of Swiss side Luzern and was promoted to the club's senior team in 2024, where he made three league appearances.

Following his stint there, he signed for Serie A side Parma during the summer of 2025.

== International career ==
Britschgi is a Switzerland youth international. On 15 November 2024, he debuted for the Switzerland national under-19 football team during a 3–3 away friendly draw with the Turkey national under-19 football team.

On 26 September 2026, Britschgi made his debut for the Switzerland national team in a 2026–27 UEFA Nations League B game against North Macedonia.

== Style of play ==
Britschgi plays as a defender and is right-footed. Italian news website TuttoMercatoWeb wrote in 2025 that he "consistently demonstrated solid defense and excellent read of the game, while never giving up his ability to attack. These attributes allow him to cover the entire flank with pace, explosiveness, and power, providing the right contribution in both phases of play".
