= Rachid Kouda =

Italian footballer (born 2002)

Personal information
- Date of birth: 25 July 2002 (age 24)
- Place of birth: Cantù, Italy
- Height: 1.88 m (6 ft 2 in)
- Position: Midfielder

Team information
- Current team: Mantova (on loan from Parma)
- Number: 80

Youth career
- –2014: Mariano
- 2014–2016: Atalanta
- 2016–2017: Renate
- 2017–2029: Luciano Manara
- 2019–2021: Caratese
- 2021: → Cagliari (loan)

Senior career*
Years	Team	Apps	(Gls)
2019–2022	Caratese	44	(8)
2022–2023	Picerno	32	(2)
2023–2024	Spezia	26	(2)
2024–	Parma	1	(0)
2024–2026	→ Spezia (loan)	32	(4)
2026	→ Mantova (loan)	15	(1)
2026–	→ Mantova (loan)	4	(0)

International career^{‡}
2024	Italy U21	1	(0)
2026–	Burkina Faso	1	(0)
- * Club domestic league appearances and goals as of 20 September 2026 ‡ National team caps and goals as of 26 September 2026

Rachid Kouda (born 25 July 2002) is a professional footballer who plays as a midfielder for Serie B club Mantova, on loan from Parma. Born in Italy, he plays for the Burkina Faso national team.

== Club career ==
Kouda was born in Cantù, Italy to Burkinabé parents. He began his youth career with local club Mariano Calcio, before being admitted to the Atalanta youth academy after a successful tryout. In 2016, he was released by the club. He then played for the youth teams of Renate, Luciano Manara, Caratese and Cagliari. On 1 December 2019, he made his senior debut with Caratese in the Serie D game against Virtus Bolzano. After three seasons at the club, he scored 8 goals after 44 league appearances.

In July 2022, Kouda signed for Serie C side Picerno, where he netted 2 goals after 32 games in his only season with the club.

On 17 July 2023, Kouda joined Serie B club Spezia, signing a three-year contract. He scored his first goal for Spezia on 24 November 2023 against Sampdoria.

On 30 August 2024, Kouda signed a contract with Parma and was loaned back to Spezia for the rest of the 2024–25 season. On 12 August 2025, he returned to Spezia on loan for the 2025–26 season.

On 23 January 2026, Kouda moved on a new loan to Mantova in Serie B.

Upon his return from loan, Kouda made his Serie A debut for Parma on 22 August 2026 against Cagliari, substituting Mandela Keita in the 75th minute. Six days later, he returned to Mantova on a season-long loan, with an option to buy, a counter-option and a conditional obligation to buy.

== International career ==
In May 2024, Kouda received his first call up to the Italy U21 team, being part of the squad for the 2024 Maurice Revello Tournament.

In September 2026, Kouda was called up to the Burkina Faso national team to compete in the 2027 Africa Cup of Nations qualifiers matches against Benin and Central African Republic
