= Giuseppe Aurelio =

Italian footballer

Personal information
- Date of birth: 22 March 2000 (age 26)
- Place of birth: Bracciano, Italy
- Height: 1.86 m (6 ft 1 in)
- Position: Left-back

Team information
- Current team: Cagliari
- Number: 24

Youth career
- 2014–2020: Sassuolo

Senior career*
Years	Team	Apps	(Gls)
2020–2022	Sassuolo	0	(0)
2020–2021	→ Cesena (loan)	3	(0)
2021	→ Imolese (loan)	18	(2)
2021–2022	→ Gubbio (loan)	17	(1)
2022–2023	Pontedera	23	(4)
2023–2025	Palermo	35	(2)
2024–2025	→ Spezia (loan)	25	(3)
2025–2026	Spezia	33	(6)
2026–	Cagliari	0	(0)
- * Club domestic league appearances and goals as of 10 August 2026

Giuseppe Aurelio (born 22 March 2000) is an Italian professional footballer who plays as a left-back for Serie A club Cagliari.

== Career ==
Born in Bracciano, Aurelio joined Sassuolo Primavera in 2014.

On 29 August 2020, he was loaned to Serie C club Cesena. Aurelio made his professional debut on 27 September 2020, against Virtus Verona. In the middle of the season, on 21 January 2021, he joined Imolese on loan.

On 15 July 2021, he joined Gubbio on loan.

On 8 July 2022, Aurelio moved to Pontedera on a two-year contract.

On 31 January 2023, Aurelio joined Serie B club Palermo for an undisclosed fee, agreeing to sign a contract until 30 June 2027.

On 15 July 2024, Aurelio was loaned out to fellow Serie B club Spezia with an option to buy.

On 23 June 2025, Spezia acquired Aurelio permanently from Palermo.
