= Elian Demirović =

Slovenian footballer

Personal information
- Date of birth: 1 June 2000 (age 26)
- Place of birth: Šempeter pri Gorici, Slovenia
- Height: 1.84 m (6 ft 0 in)
- Position: Midfielder

Team information
- Current team: Arka Gdynia
- Number: 72

Youth career
- –2012: Gorica
- 2014–2016: Bilje
- 2016–2020: Inter Milan
- 2019–2020: → Chievo (loan)

Senior career*
Years	Team	Apps	(Gls)
2020–2021	Fermana	13	(2)
2022	Orijent	8	(0)
2022–2023	Primorje	23	(4)
2023–2024	Virtus Verona	29	(3)
2024–2026	Juve Stabia	0	(0)
2024–2025	→ Legnago (loan)	19	(2)
2025	→ Giugliano (loan)	8	(0)
2025–2026	→ Primorje (loan)	31	(4)
2026–	Arka Gdynia	0	(0)

International career
2015–2016	Slovenia U16	3	(0)
2017	Slovenia U17	2	(0)
2018	Slovenia U18	1	(0)
2018	Slovenia U19	3	(1)
- * Club domestic league appearances and goals as of 19:28, 22 July 2026 (UTC)

Elian Demirović (born 1 June 2000) is a Slovenian professional footballer who plays as a midfielder for I liga club Arka Gdynia.

== Career ==
Demirović started his career with Inter Milan, one of Italy's most successful clubs.

In 2019, he was sent on loan to Italian Serie A side Chievo.

In 2020, Demirović signed with Fermana in the Italian third division.

On 19 August 2023, Demirović signed a one-year contract with Serie C club Virtus Verona, with an option to extend.

On 13 July 2024, he joined Juve Stabia. On 2 August 2024, Demirović was loaned to Legnago.

On 20 January 2025, he went to Giugliano on loan. On 16 July 2025, Demirović returned to Primorje on loan with an option to buy.

On 21 July 2026, Demirović signed a two-year deal with Polish second-tier club Arka Gdynia.
