= Christian Comotto =

Italian footballer (born 2008)

Personal information
- Date of birth: 25 April 2008 (age 18)
- Place of birth: Ivrea, Italy
- Height: 1.85 m (6 ft 1 in)
- Position: Central midfielder

Team information
- Current team: AC Milan
- Number: 28

Youth career
- 2014–2015: Perugia
- 2015–2016: Inter Milan
- 2016–2020: Fiorentina
- 2020–2025: AC Milan

Senior career*
Years	Team	Apps	(Gls)
2025	Milan Futuro (res.)	0	(0)
2025–	AC Milan	2	(0)
2025–2026	→ Spezia (loan)	28	(0)

International career^{‡}
2022–2023	Italy U15	14	(2)
2023–2024	Italy U16	11	(2)
2024–2025	Italy U17	14	(1)
2025–	Italy U18	1	(0)
2026–	Italy U19	7	(1)
- * Club domestic league appearances and goals as of 15:40, 29 October 2026 (UTC) ‡ National team caps and goals as of 5 July 2026

Christian Comotto (born 25 April 2008) is an Italian professional footballer who plays as a central midfielder for Serie A club AC Milan. He is an Italian youth international.

== Club career ==
=== Youth career ===
Comotto started his career in the youth academy of Perugia, later he played for the youth academies of Inter Milan and Fiorentina.

=== AC Milan ===
In 2020 he moved to the youth academy of AC Milan. During the 2023–24 season he scored 14 goals for the U17s, becoming the top-scoring under-15 midfielder in Italy in the Primavera. In the 2024–25 season he had four goals and three assists in 36 games. Comotto signed his first professional contract with AC Milan in July 2024.

He was first called-up with the newly created reserve team Milan Futuro on 8 February 2025, for a 2–0 home loss Serie C match against Lucchese, but didn't play.

On 31 July 2025, during the 2025–26 pre-season, Comotto was called-up with the senior squad for the first time by head coach Massimiliano Allegri, and he scored a goal for AC Milan by performing a Panenka-style penalty in a 9–0 friendly win against Australian A-League Men club Perth Glory.

He was one of the 26 players called-up with the senior squad by head coach Ruben Amorim on 12 July 2026, for pre-season ahead of the 2026–27 season.

==== Loan to Spezia ====
On 4 August 2025, after being promoted to the AC Milan senior team, Comotto joined Serie B club Spezia on loan for the 2025–26 season.

== International career ==
Comotto has represented Italy at under-15, under-16, under-17, under-18 and under-19 levels.

== Style of play ==
Comotto plays as a central midfielder and has a great physique and technical ability. He has often been compared to Sandro Tonali.

== Personal life ==
His father, Gianluca Comotto, is a retired Italian footballer who played as a defender.

== Career statistics ==
As of match played 28 October 2026

Appearances and goals by club, season and competition
Club	Season	League			Coppa Italia		Continental		Other		Total	
Club	Season	Division	Apps	Goals	Apps	Goals	Apps	Goals	Apps	Goals	Apps	Goals
Milan Futuro	2024–25	Serie C	0	0	—		—		—		0	0
Spezia (loan)	2025–26	Serie B	28	0	2	0	—		0	0	30	0
AC Milan	2026–27	Serie A	2	0	0	0	1 (Note: Appearance in UEFA Europa League)	0	—		3	0
Career total			30	0	2	0	1	0	0	0	33	0
