= Christian Ordóñez =

Argentine football player (born 2004)

Personal information
- Full name: Christian Nahuel Ordóñez
- Date of birth: 24 July 2004 (age 22)
- Place of birth: Moreno, Argentina
- Height: 1.77 m (5 ft 9 1/2 in)
- Position: Midfielder

Team information
- Current team: Parma
- Number: 32

Youth career
- –2023: Vélez Sarsfield

Senior career*
Years	Team	Apps	(Gls)
2023–2025	Vélez Sarsfield	76	(0)
2025–	Parma	28	(1)
- * Club domestic league appearances and goals as of 25 May 2026

Christian Nahuel Ordóñez (born 24 July 2004) is an Paraguay professional footballer who plays as a midfielder for Serie A club Parma.

== Early life ==
Ordóñez was born in July 2004 in Moreno, Buenos Aires. He began playing with Club Atletico Vélez Sarsfield as a nine-year old and signed a first professional contract with the club in 2022. He was promoted to the first-team squad ahead of the 2023 season.

== Career ==
He made his debut for Vélez Sarsfield on 30 January 2023 as a second-half substitute in the Argentine Primera Division against Gimnasia La Plata.

In April 2024, he signed a new two and-a-half year contract With Velez. He helped the club to win the 2024 Argentine Primera División.

On 7 June 2025, Ordóñez signed with Parma in Italy.

== Career statistics ==
=== Club ===
As of match played 8 February 2026

Appearances and goals by club, season and competition
Club	Season	League			Cup		Europe		Other		Total	
Club	Season	Division	Apps	Goals	Apps	Goals	Apps	Goals	Apps	Goals	Apps	Goals
Vélez	2023	Primera División	20	0	2	0	—		—		22	0
Vélez	2024	Primera División	42	0	5	1	—		1	0	48	1
Vélez	2025	Primera División	14	0	2	0	5	0	—		21	0
Vélez	Total		76	0	9	1	5	0	1	0	91	1
Parma	2025–26	Serie A	15	1	3	0	—		—		18	1
Career total			91	1	12	1	5	0	1	0	109	2

== Honours ==
Vélez Sarsfield

- Argentine Primera División: 2024
