= Vanja Vlahović =

Serbian footballer (born 2004)

Vanja Vlahović Вања Влаховић
Personal information
- Date of birth: 23 March 2004 (age 22)
- Place of birth: Belgrade, Serbia and Montenegro
- Height: 1.84 m (6 ft 0 in)
- Position: Striker

Team information
- Current team: Mantova (on loan from Atalanta)
- Number: 99

Youth career
- –2022: Partizan
- 2023–2024: Atalanta

Senior career*
Years	Team	Apps	(Gls)
2022–2023	Partizan	0	(0)
2022	→ Teleoptik (loan)	13	(9)
2023–	Atalanta U23	43	(24)
2024–	Atalanta	3	(0)
2025–2026	→ Spezia (loan)	22	(2)
2026–	→ Mantova (loan)	0	(0)

International career^{‡}
2019	Serbia U15	1	(1)
2019	Serbia U16	3	(1)
2020	Serbia U17	1	(0)
2021–2022	Serbia U18	2	(0)
2024–	Serbia U21	9	(5)
- * Club domestic league appearances and goals as of 22 August 2026 ‡ National team caps and goals as of 18 November 2025

Vanja Vlahović (Serbian Cyrillic: Вања Влаховић; born 23 March 2004) is a Serbian professional footballer who plays as a striker for Serie B club Mantova, on loan from Atalanta.

== Career ==
Vlahović started his career with Serbian side Partizan. In early 2022, he was sent on loan to Serbian side Teleoptik. In 2023, he signed for Italian side Atalanta, immediately joining the club's under-23 team in the Serie C.

On 24 September 2024, Vlahović made his Serie A debut against Como.

On 15 July 2025, Vlahović was loaned by Spezia in Serie B.

== Style of play ==
Vlahović has been described as having "an excellent sense of space, attacking depth, especially in small spaces."

== Personal life ==
Vlahović's brother Igor plays as a striker in Serbia's amateur leagues. Neither are related to Dušan Vlahović.
