= Gian Marco Crespi =

Italian footballer (born 2001)

Personal information
- Date of birth: 28 June 2001 (age 25)
- Place of birth: Udine, Italy
- Height: 1.89 m (6 ft 2 in)
- Position: Goalkeeper

Team information
- Current team: Ascoli

Youth career
- –2019: Udinese

Senior career*
Years	Team	Apps	(Gls)
2019–2020	Gozzano	22	(0)
2020–2023	Crotone	1	(0)
2020	→ Gozzano (loan)	0	(0)
2021	→ Renate (loan)	0	(0)
2021–2022	→ Pistoiese (loan)	15	(0)
2022–2023	→ Picerno (loan)	17	(0)
2023	→ Juventus Next Gen (loan)	4	(0)
2023	Juventus Next Gen	0	(0)
2024–2025	Spezia	0	(0)
2025	→ Caldiero Terme (loan)	15	(0)
2025–2026	Athens Kallithea	22	(0)
2026–	Ascoli	0	(0)
- * Club domestic league appearances and goals as of 25 April 2026

Gian Marco Crespi (born 28 June 2001) is an Italian professional footballer who plays as a goalkeeper for Serie B club Ascoli.

== Career ==
On 31 January 2020, Crespi signed with Crotone and was loaned back to Gozzano until the end of the 2019–20 season.

On 22 May 2021 he made his serie A debut in Crotone–Fiorentina.

On 2 August 2021 he went to Renate on loan.

On 26 August 2021 he joined Pistoiese on loan.

On 22 July 2022, Crespi was loaned by Picerno.

On 24 January 2023, he was loaned to Juventus Next Gen. In February of the same year, he received his first call-up to Juventus' first team for the first leg of the UEFA Europa League knockout play-off against Nantes.

On 1 September 2023, Crespi's contract with Crotone was terminated by mutual consent.

On 23 October 2023, Crespi signed a one-year contract with Juventus Next Gen.

On 18 January 2024, Crespi joined Serie B club Spezia on a permanent deal, signing a three-year-and-a-half contract.

On 2 January 2025, he joined Serie C side Caldiero Terme on loan.

On 25 August 2025, he joined Super League Greece 2 club Athens Kallithea.

== Club statistics ==
As of match played 2 March 2023

Appearances and goals by club, season and competition
Club	Season	League			National cup		League cup		Total	
Club	Season	Division	Apps	Goals	Apps	Goals	Apps	Goals	Apps	Goals
Gozzano	2019–20	Serie C	22	0	0	0	2	0	24	0
Crotone	2020–21	Serie A	1	0	0	0	—		1	0
Pistoiese (loan)	2021–22	Serie C	15	0	0	0	1	0	16	0
AZ Picerno	2022–23	Serie C	17	0	0	0	0	0	17	0
Juventus Next Gen	2022–23	Serie C	4	0	0	0	2	0	6	0
Career total			60	0	0	0	5	0	65	0
