= 2022–23 US Catanzaro 1929 season =

Catanzaro
2022–23 season
- President: Floriano Noto
- Manager: Vincenzo Vivarini
- Stadium: Stadio Nicola Ceravolo
- Serie C: 1st
- Coppa Italia: Preliminary round
- Coppa Italia Serie C: Quarterfinal
- Supercoppa di Serie C: Winners
- Top goalscorer: League: Pietro Iemmello (28); All: Pietro Iemmello (30)
- Highest home attendance: 12,138 vs Crotone
- Lowest home attendance: 4,484 vs Giugliano
- Average home league attendance: 7,637
- Biggest win: 6–0 vs Monopoli (20 February 2023)
- Biggest defeat: 0–1 vs Viterbese Castrense (13 February 2023)
- All statistics correct as of 26 May 2023.

The 2022–23 season was the 88th season in the existence of Unione Sportiva Catanzaro 1929 and the club's fifth consecutive season of the Serie C since its restructuring in 2017. In addition to the domestic league, Catanzaro participated in this season's edition of the Coppa Italia for the 46th time as well as the 2022–23 Coppa Italia Serie C for the 31st time. The club qualified for Serie B in the following season after topping the group with five rounds to spare.

== Squad ==
As of 25 January 2023

Note: Flags indicate national team as defined under FIFA eligibility rules; some limited exceptions apply. Players may hold more than one non-FIFA nationality.

No.	Pos.	Nation	Player
1	GK	ITA	Andrea Fulignati
3	MF	ITA	Alberto Tentardini
5	DF	ITA	Luca Martinelli
6	MF	GHA	Nana Welbeck
7	MF	ITA	Gabriele Rolando
8	MF	ITA	Luca Verna
9	FW	ITA	Pietro Iemmello
10	FW	ITA	Francesco Bombagi
12	GK	ITA	Alfonso Rizzuto
13	DF	ITA	Pasquale Fazio
14	DF	ITA	Stefano Scognamillo
16	GK	ITA	Andrea Sala
17	FW	ITA	Enrico Brignola (on loan from Benevento)

No.	Pos.	Nation	Player
18	MF	ITA	Andrea Ghion (on loan from Sassuolo)
20	MF	ITA	Simone Pontisso
21	FW	ITA	Alessio Curcio
23	DF	ITA	Nicolò Brighenti
24	MF	GRE	Dimitris Sounas
27	FW	BEL	Jari Vandeputte
28	FW	ITA	Tommaso Biasci
44	DF	ITA	Riccardo Gatti
77	MF	GRE	Panos Katseris
88	MF	ITA	Antonio Cinelli
91	DF	ITA	Giorgio Megna
92	MF	CRO	Mario Šitum
99	FW	ITA	Pietro Cianci

== Transfers ==
=== Transfers in ===
No.	Pos.	Player	Transferred from	Fee	Contract length	Date	Source
28	FW	(Italy) Tommaso Biasci	(Italy) Padova	Exercised option to buy	2 years (Note: with option for third year)	16 June 2022	
1	GK	(Italy) Andrea Fulignati	(Italy) Perugia	Free transfer	2 years	28 June 2022	
16	GK	(Italy) Andrea Sala	(Italy) Catania	Free transfer	2 years	1 July 2022	
91	DF	(Italy) Giorgio Megna	(Italy) Sassuolo	Loan return	Unknown	2 July 2022	
20	MF	(Italy) Simone Pontisso	(Italy) Pescara	Free transfer	2 years	5 July 2022	
9	FW	(Italy) Pietro Iemmello	(Italy) Frosinone	Exercised option to buy	1 year (Note: with option)	8 July 2022	
23	DF	(Italy) Nicolò Brighenti	(Italy) Frosinone	Free transfer	2 years	16 July 2022	
27	MF	(Belgium) Jari Vandeputte	(Italy) L.R. Vicenza	Free transfer	3 years	1 August 2022	
21	MF	(Italy) Alessio Curcio	(Italy) Foggia	Free transfer	2 years	13 August 2022	
77	MF	(Greece) Panos Katseris	(Italy) Team Nuova Florida	Free transfer	3 years	19 August 2022	
92	MF	(Croatia) Mario Šitum	(Italy) Reggina	Free transfer	Unknown	1 September 2022	
17	MF	(Italy) Enrico Brignola	(Italy) Benevento	Loan	6 months (Note: with obligation to buy in case of promotion)	25 January 2023	

=== Transfers out ===
No.	Pos.	Player	Transferred to	Fee	Date	Source
19	FW	(Iceland) Bjarki Steinn Bjarkason	(Italy) Venezia	End of loan	unknown	
1	GK	(Italy) Timothy Nocchi	Unattached	End of contract	unknown	
12	GK	(Italy) Andrea Romagnoli	Unattached	End of contract	unknown	
15	DF	(Ecuador) Luis Maldonado	(Italy) Lecco	Unknown	12 August 2022	
33	GK	(Italy) Paolo Branduani	(Italy) Crotone	Free transfer	24 June 2022	
2	DF	(France) Brian Bayeye	(Italy) Torino	Undisclosed	4 July 2022	
29	FW	(Italy) Massimiliano Carlini	(Italy) Monterosi Tuscia	Undisclosed	14 July 2022	
4	DF	(Italy) Simone De Santis	(Italy) Ancona	Undisclosed	19 July 2022	
	MF	(Italy) Andrea Risolo	(Italy) Virtus Francavilla	Undisclosed	19 July 2022	
9	FW	(Argentina) Federico Vázquez	(Italy) Gubbio	Undisclosed	18 August 2022	
45	DF	(Italy) Erasmo Mulè	(Italy) Juventus	End of loan	3 January 2023	

== Pre-season and friendlies ==
Win Draw Loss

== Competitions ==
=== Overall record ===
Competition	First match	Last match	Starting round	Final position	Record							
Competition	First match	Last match	Starting round	Final position	Pld	W	D	L	GF	GA	GD	Win %
Serie C	5 September 2022	May 2023	Matchday 1	Winners	38	30	6	2	102	21	+81	78.95
Coppa Italia	1 August 2022		Preliminary round	Preliminary round	1	0	0	1	1	3	−2	0.00
Coppa Italia Serie C	3 November 2022	8 December 2022	Second round	Quarterfinal	3	1	1	1	6	6	+0	33.33
Supercoppa di Serie C	29 April 2023	13 May 2023	Matchday 1	Winners	2	1	1	0	4	3	+1	50.00
Total					44	32	8	4	113	33	+80	72.73

Last updated: 22 May 2023
Source: Competitions

=== Serie C ===
==== League table ====
Pos	Team	Pld	W	D	L	GF	GA	GD	Pts	Qualification
1	Catanzaro (P)	38	30	6	2	102	21	+81	96	Promotion to Serie B. Qualification for the Supercoppa di Serie C
2	Crotone	38	23	11	4	57	31	+26	80	Qualification for the promotion play-offs national phase
3	Pescara	38	19	8	11	58	42	+16	65	Qualification for the promotion play-offs national phase
4	Foggia	38	18	7	13	60	44	+16	61	Qualification for the promotion play-offs group phase
5	Audace Cerignola	38	16	12	10	48	41	+7	60	Qualification for the promotion play-offs group phase

Updated to match(es) played on 16 April 2023. Source: Lega Pro, Soccerway (in English)
Rules for classification: 1) Points; 2) Head-to-head points; 3) Head-to-head goal difference; 4) Goal difference; 5) Goals scored; 6) Lower goals against; 7) Wins; 8) Lower losses; 9) Away wins; 10) Lower home losses.
(P) Promoted

==== Results summary ====
Overall								Home						Away					
Pld	W	D	L	GF	GA	GD	Pts	W	D	L	GF	GA	GD	W	D	L	GF	GA	GD
38	30	6	2	102	21	+81	96	18	1	0	62	8	+54	12	5	2	40	13	+27

Last updated: March 2023.
Source: SofaScore

==== Results by round ====
Round	1	2	3	4	5	6	7	8	9	10	11	12	13	14	15	16	17	18	19	20	21	22	23	24	25	26	27	28	29	30	31	32	33	34	35	36	37	38
Ground	H	A	H	A	H	A	A	H	A	H	A	H	A	H	A	H	H	A	H	A	H	A	H	A	H	H	A	H	A	H	A	H	A	H	A	A	H	A
Result	W	W	W	D	W	W	W	W	W	W	D	W	W	W	W	W	W	D	W	W	W	W	W	D	W	W	L	W	W	W	D	W	W	D	W	W	W	L
Position	1	1	1	2	1	1	1	1	1	1	1	1	1	1	1	1	1	1	1	1	1	1	1	1	1	1	1	1	1	1	1	1	1	1	1	1	1	1
Points	3	6	9	10	13	16	19	22	25	28	29	32	35	38	41	44	47	48	51	54	57	60	63	64	67	70	70	73	76	79	80	83	86	87	90	93	96	96

Updated to match(es) played on May 2006. Source: Serie C
A = Away; H = Home; W = Win; D = Draw; L = Loss

==== Matches ====
4 September 2022 1	Catanzaro	4–0	Picerno	Catanzaro
20:30 CEST (UTC+2)	Biasci 27'; Iemmello 42'; Mulè 51'; Cianci 90+1'	Report		Stadium: Stadio Nicola Ceravolo; Attendance: 6,642; Referee: Fabio Pirrotta

11 September 2022 2	Taranto	0–3	Catanzaro	Taranto
17:30 CEST (UTC+2)		Report	11' Sounas; 17', 43' Biasci	Stadium: Stadio Erasmo Iacovone; Attendance: 3,568; Referee: Enrico Maggio

14 September 2023 3	Catanzaro	5–0	Latina	Catanzaro
21:00 CEST (UTC+2)	Šitum 36'; Iemmello 47'; Sounas 55'; Curcio 86'; Cianci 86'	Report		Stadium: Stadio Nicola Ceravolo; Attendance: 6,061; Referee: Alessandro Di Graci

18 September 2022 4	Audace Cerignola	2–2	Catanzaro	Cerignola
17:30 CEST (UTC+2)	Malcore 15'; Coccia 89'	Report	11' Biasci; 90+5' Pontissi	Stadium: Stadio Domenico Monterisi; Attendance: 2,000; Referee: Simone Galipò

24 Septembero 2022 5	Catanzaro	3–0	Messina	Catanzaro
20:30 CEST (UTC+2)	Vandeputte 12', 62'; Iemmello 76'	Report		Stadium: Stadio Nicola Ceravolo; Attendance: 7,289; Referee: Gabriele Scatena

1 October 2022 6	Turris	0–4	Catanzaro	Torre del Greco
17:30 CEST (UTC+2)		Report	21' Di Nunzio; 34' Sounas; 38' Biasci; 58' Iemmello	Stadium: Stadio Amerigo Liguori; Attendance: 1,520; Referee: Davide Di Marco

8 October 2022 7	Fidelis Andria	0–4	Catanzaro	Andria
14:30 CEST (UTC+2)		Report	30', 74' Vandeputte; 39' Iemmello; 45' Biasci	Stadium: Stadio Degli Ulivi; Attendance: 1,959; Referee: Mario Saia

15 October 2022 8	Catanzaro	3–2	Viterbese	Catanzaro
17:30 CEST (UTC+2)	Sounas 1'; Cianci 62'; Curcio 85'	Report	33' Polidori; 55' Monteagudo	Stadium: Stadio Nicola Ceravolo; Attendance: 6,813; Referee: Kevin Bonacina

18 October 2022 9	Monopoli	0–1	Catanzaro	Monopoli
21:00 CEST (UTC+2)		Report	41' Vandeputte	Stadium: Stadio Simone Veneziani; Attendance: 1,713; Referee: Mattia Pascarella

22 October 2022 10	Catanzaro	2–0	Juve Stabia	Catanzaro
17:30 CEST (UTC+2)	Tentardini 40'; Iemmello 55' (pen.)	Report		Stadium: Stadio Nicola Ceravolo; Attendance: 6,937; Referee: Andrea Calzavara

30 October 2022 11	Avellino	1–0	Catanzaro	Avellino
17:30 CET (UTC+1)	Gambale 61'; Kanoute 80'	Report	3' Sounas; 9' Biasci	Stadium: Stadio Partenio-Adriano Lombardi; Attendance: 6,276; Referee: Stefano Nicolini

6 November 2022 12	Catanzaro	2–0	Crotone	Catanzaro
14:30 CEST (UTC+1)	Iemmello 17'; Curcio 68'	Report		Stadium: Stadio Nicola Ceravolo; Attendance: 12,138; Referee: Marco Mondali

13 November 2022 13	Monterosi Tuscia	0–1	Catanzaro	Viterbo
14:30 CET (UTC+1)		Report	54' Fazio	Stadium: Stadio Enrico Rocchi; Attendance: 1,000; Referee: Claudio Panettella

20 November 2022 14	Catanzaro	3–0	Gelbison	Catanzaro
14:30 CET (UTC+1)	Iemmello 22', 74'; Biasci 58'	Report		Stadium: Stadio Nicola Ceravolo; Attendance: 5,133; Referee: Matteo Centi

27 November 2022 15	Pescara	0–3	Catanzaro	Pescara
14:30 CET (UTC+1)		Report	5' Šitum; 56', 80' Martinelli	Stadium: Stadio Adriatico – Giovanni Cornacchia; Attendance: 12,994; Referee: Davide Di Marco

30 November 2022 16	Catanzaro	3–0	Giugliano	Catanzaro
17:30 CET (UTC+1)	Ghion 45+1'; Iemmello 71' (pen.); Scognamillo 83'	Report		Stadium: Stadio Nicola Ceravolo; Attendance: 4,484; Referee: Mario Perri

4 December 2022 17	Catanzaro	4–1	Virtus Francavilla	Catanzaro
14:30 CET (UTC+1)	Iemmello 17'; Bombagi 32', 66'; Curcio 82'	Report	87' Cardoselli	Stadium: Stadio Nicola Ceravolo; Attendance: 6,943; Referee: Andrea Bordin

12 December 2022 18	Foggia	0–0	Catanzaro	Foggia
20:30 CET (UTC+1)		Report		Stadium: Stadio Pino Zaccheria; Attendance: Referee: Michele Giordano

18 December 2022 19	Catanzaro	6–1	Potenza	Catanzaro
12:30 CET (UTC+1)	Katseris 1'; Biasci 17' (pen.), 51'; Sounas 37'; Vandeputte 54'; Iemmello 84'	Report	7' Di Grazia	Stadium: Stadio Nicola Ceravolo; Attendance: 7,349; Referee: Mario Saia

23 December 2022 20	Picerno	0–1	Catanzaro	Picerno
14:30 CET (UTC+1)		Report	73' Cianci	Stadium: Stadio Donato Curcio; Attendance: 1,240; Referee: Enrico Maggio

7 December 2022 21	Catanzaro	1–0	Taranto	Catanzaro
17:30 CET (UTC+1)	Iemmello 5'	Report		Stadium: Stadio Nicola Ceravolo; Attendance: 8,141; Referee: Filippo Giaccalgia

15 January 2023 22	Latina	0–1	Catanzaro	Latina
14:30 CET (UTC+1)		Report	31' Biasci	Stadium: Stadio Domenico Francioni; Attendance: 2,774; Referee: Marco Monaldi

22 January 2023 23	Catanzaro	4–0	Audace Cerignola	Catanzaro
14:30 CET (UTC+1)	Biasci 25'; Vandeputte 42'; Iemmello 51', 56'	Report		Stadium: Stadio Nicola Ceravolo; Attendance: 6,089; Referee: Claudio Petrella

29 January 2023 24	Messina	1–1	Catanzaro	Messina
14:30 CET (UTC+1)	Baldé 64'	Report	45+4' Verna	Stadium: Stadio Franco Scoglio; Attendance: 2,647; Referee: Stefano Nicolini

1 February 2023 25	Catanzaro	1–0	Turris	Catanzaro
18:00 CET (UTC+1)	Sounas 6'	Report		Stadium: Stadio Nicola Ceravolo; Attendance: 6,389; Referee: Adalberto Fiero

5 February 2023 26	Catanzaro	4–0	Fidelis Andria	Catanzaro
14:30 CET (UTC+1)	Scognamillo 28'; Iemmello 64' (pen.), 70'; Cianci 85'	Report		Stadium: Stadio Nicola Ceravolo; Attendance: 7,794; Referee: Roberto Lovison

12 February 2023 27	Viterbese	1–0	Catanzaro	Viterbo
17:30 CET (UTC+1)	Riggio 16'	Report		Stadium: Stadio Enrico Rocchi; Attendance: 2,208; Referee: Mattia Pascarella

19 February 2023 28	Catanzaro	6–0	Monopoli	Catanzaro
14:30 CET (UTC+1)	Iemmello 1', 80'; Vendeputte 40', 60'; Biasci 46'; Brignola 84'	Report		Stadium: Stadio Nicola Ceravolo; Attendance: 8,010; Referee: Michele Delrio

25 February 2023 29	Juve Stabia	1–4	Catanzaro	Castellamare di Stabia
14:30 CET (UTC+1)	Scaccabarozzi 87'	Report	4', 9' Iemmello; 20' Biasci; 73' Vandeputte	Stadium: Stadio Romeo Menti; Attendance: 2,000; Referee: Matteo Centi

4 March 2023 30	Catanzaro	4–1	Avellino	Catanzaro
17:30 CET (UTC+1)	Biasci 30' (pen.), 88'; Iemmello 69'; Pontisso 90+3'	Report	12' Marconi	Stadium: Stadio Nicola Ceravolo; Attendance: 9,777; Referee: Simone Galipò

13 March 2023 31	Crotone	1–1	Catanzaro	Crotone
20:30 CET (UTC+1)	Mogoș 55'	Report	73' Verna	Stadium: Stadio Ezio Scida; Attendance: 6,016; Referee: Michele Giordano

16 March 2023 32	Catanzaro	3–0	Monterosi Tuscia	Catanzaro
17:30 CET (UTC+1)	Scognamillo 43'; Martinelli 51'; Vandeputte 62'	Report		Stadium: Stadio Nicola Ceravolo; Attendance: 9,310; Referee: Daniele Virgilio

19 March 2023 33	Gelbison	0–2	Catanzaro	Salerno
14:30 CET (UTC+1)		Report	18' Iemmello; 90+3' Brignola	Stadium: Stadio Arechi; Attendance: 10,000; Referee: Giuseppe Collu

25 March 2023 34	Catanzaro	2–2	Pescara	Catanzaro
17:30 CET (UTC+1)	Curcio 35'; Iemmello 90+1' (pen.)	Report	22', 65' Lescano	Stadium: Stadio Nicola Ceravolo; Attendance: 11,691; Referee: Mario Marotta

2 April 2006 35	Giugliano	0–4	Catanzaro	Giugliano in Campania
17:30 CEST (UTC+2)		Report	6' Gatti; 17' Curcio; 74', 90+1' Iemmello	Stadium: Stadio Alberto De Cristofaro; Attendance: 336; Referee: Carlo Rinaldi

8 April 2023 36	Virtus Francavilla	2–4	Catanzaro	Francavilla Fontana
20:30 CEST (UTC+2)	Patierno 48', 59'	Report	33' Iemmello; 43', 71', 90' Curcio	Stadium: Stadio Giovanni Paolo II; Attendance: 1,600; Referee: Domenico Castellone

16 April 2023 37	Catanzaro	2–1	Foggia	Catanzaro
17:30 CEST (UTC+2)	Iemmello 1', 16'	Report	28' Bjarkason	Stadium: Stadio Nicola Ceravolo; Attendance: 8,108; Referee: Luca Angelucci

23 April 2023 38	Potenza	3–2	Catanzaro	Potenza
17:30 CEST (UTC+2)	Murano 12', 36'; Del Pinto 59'	Report	50' Iemmello; 68' Sounas	Stadium: Stadio Alfredo Viviani; Attendance: 3,887; Referee: Francesco D'Eusanio

=== Coppa Italia ===
31 July 2022 Preliminary round	Modena (2)	3–1	Catanzaro (3)	Modena
20:30 CEST	Silvestri 2'; Diaw 45'; Magnino 75'	Report	Tentardini 59'	Stadium: Stadio Alberto Braglia; Attendance: 4,616; Referee: Daniele Perenzoni

=== Coppa Italia Serie C ===
2 November 2022 Second round	Catanzaro	3–1	Potenza	Catanzaro
19:30 CEST	Cianci 17', 68'; Curcio 49' (pen.)	Report	72' Del Sole	Stadium: Stadio Nicola Ceravolo

16 November 2022 Round of 16	Catanzaro	3–3 (4–2 p)	Avellino	Catanzaro
17:00 CEST	Iemmello 16'; Biasci 47', 102'	Report	45' Kanoute; 51' Murano; 116' Casarini	Stadium: Stadio Nicola Ceravolo
	Penalties
	Pontisso (penalty missed); Biasci (penalty scored); Cianci (penalty scored); Welbeck (penalty scored); Gatti (penalty scored)		(penalty scored) Trotta; (penalty missed) Franco; (penalty scored) Maisto; (penalty missed) Tito

7 December 2022 Quarterfinal	Foggia	2–0	Catanzaro	Foggia
14:30 CEST	Ogunseye 76'; D'Ursi 90+1'	Report		Stadium: Stadio Pino Zaccheria

=== Supercoppa di Serie C ===
29 April 2023 Matchday 1	Catanzaro	2–1	FeralpiSalò	Catanzaro
16:30 CEST	Tonetto 56' (o.g.); Iemmello 65'	Report	54' Butić	Stadium: Stadio Nicola Ceravolo; Referee: Bogdan Sfira

13 May 2023 Matchday 3	Reggiana	2–2	Catanzaro	Reggio Emilia
18:30 CEST	Pellegrini 32' (pen.); Rosafio 58'	Report	20' Biasci; 29' Iemmello	Stadium: Mapei Stadium; Referee: Luca Cherchi

== Squad statistics ==
Includes all competitions. Players with no appearances are not included in the list.

No.	Pos	Nat	Player	Total		Serie C		Coppa Italia		Supercoppa di C	
No.	Pos	Nat	Player	Apps	Goals	Apps	Goals	Apps	Goals	Apps	Goals
1	GK	(Italy) ITA	Andrea Fulignati	38	0	35	0	1	0	2	0
3	DF	(Italy) ITA	Alberto Tentardini	26	2	14+10	1	1	1	0+1	0
5	DF	(Italy) ITA	Luca Martinelli	33	3	31	3	0	0	2	0
6	MF	(Ghana) GHA	Nana Welbeck	13	0	12	0	0+1	0	0	0
7	MF	(Italy) ITA	Gabriele Rolando	8	0	7	0	1	0	0	0
8	DF	(Italy) ITA	Luca Verna	38	2	33+2	2	1	0	2	0
9	FW	(Italy) ITA	Pietro Iemmello	39	30	34+2	28	0+1	0	2	2
10	FW	(Italy) ITA	Francesco Bombagi	23	2	4+16	2	1	0	0+2	0
13	DF	(Italy) ITA	Pasquale Fazio	11	1	10+1	1	0	0	0	0
14	DF	(Italy) ITA	Stefano Scognamillo	37	3	34	3	1	0	2	0
16	GK	(Italy) ITA	Andrea Sala	3	0	3	0	0	0	0	0
17	FW	(Italy) ITA	Enrico Brignola	15	2	5+8	2	0	0	2	0
18	MF	(Italy) ITA	Andrea Ghion	35	3	33	3	0	0	2	0
20	MF	(Italy) ITA	Simone Pontisso	34	2	10+22	2	0	0	0+2	0
21	FW	(Italy) ITA	Alessio Curcio	36	9	8+26	9	0	0	1+1	0
23	DF	(Italy) ITA	Nicolò Brighenti	36	0	33	0	1	0	2	0
24	MF	(Greece) GRE	Dimitris Sounas	35	8	31+1	8	0+1	0	2	0
27	FW	(Belgium) BEL	Jari Vandeputte	36	11	34	11	0	0	1+1	0
28	FW	(Italy) ITA	Tommaso Biasci	39	17	31+5	16	1	0	1+1	1
44	DF	(Italy) ITA	Riccardo Gatti	8	1	5+2	1	1	0	0	0
77	MF	(Greece) GRE	Panos Katseris	15	1	5+10	1	0	0	0	0
88	MF	(Italy) ITA	Antonio Cinelli	19	0	1+17	0	1	0	0	0
91	MF	(Croatia) CRO	Mario Šitum	26	2	19+6	2	0	0	1	0
99	FW	(Italy) ITA	Pietro Cianci	36	7	4+29	7	1	0	0+2	0
Players transferred during the season
45	DF	(Italy) ITA	Erasmo Mulè	1	1	1	1	0	0	0	0
17	MF	(Italy) ITA	Enrico Bearzotti	1	0	0	0	0+1	0	0	0
19	MF	(Argentina) ARG	Federico Vázquez	1	0	0	0	0+1	0	0	0
