= 2023–24 US Catanzaro 1929 season =

US Catanzaro 1929
2023–24 season
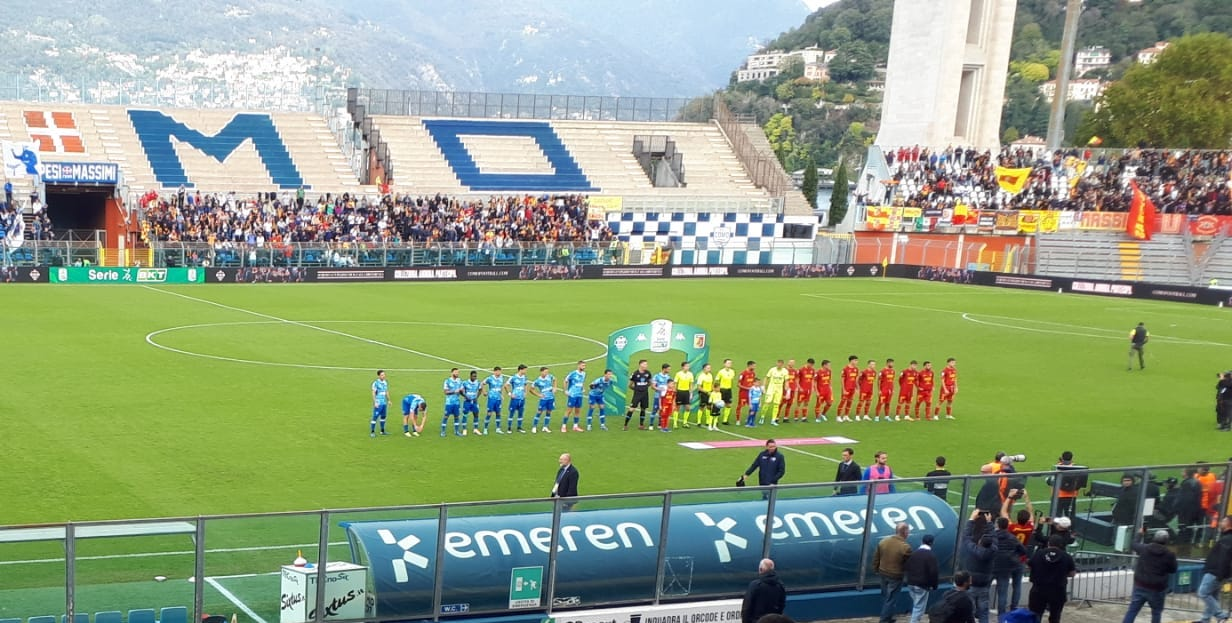
- Stadium: Stadio Nicola Ceravolo
- Serie B: 5th
- Coppa Italia: Round of 64
- Top goalscorer: League: Pietro Iemmello (15); All: Pietro Iemmello (17)
- Highest home attendance: 13,382 vs Cosenza (26 November 2023)
- Lowest home attendance: 1,500 vs Ternana (28 August 2023)
- Average home league attendance: 9,878
- Biggest win: Catanzaro 3-0 Spezia
- Biggest defeat: Catanzaro 0–5 Parma

The 2023–24 season is US Catanzaro 1929's 89th season in existence and the club's first season in Serie B after a seventeen-year hiatus. The club earned promotion by topping their group in the 2022–23 Serie C season. In addition to the domestic league, Catanzaro also participated in this season's edition of the Coppa Italia. Catanzaro finished 5th in the domestic league, qualifying for the promotion playoffs. The season covers the period from 1 July 2023 to 30 June 2024.

== Players ==
=== First-team squad ===
As of 8 September 2023

Note: Flags indicate national team as defined under FIFA eligibility rules; some limited exceptions apply. Players may hold more than one non-FIFA nationality.

No.	Pos.	Nation	Player
1	GK	ITA	Andrea Fulignati
5	DF	BUL	Dimo Krastev (on loan from Fiorentina)
6	MF	GHA	Nana Welbeck
7	FW	ITA	Luca D'Andrea (on loan from Sassuolo)
8	MF	ITA	Luca Verna
9	FW	ITA	Pietro Iemmello (Captain)
14	DF	ITA	Stefano Scognamillo
16	GK	ITA	Andrea Sala
17	FW	ITA	Enrico Brignola
18	MF	ITA	Andrea Ghion
19	FW	ITA	Matteo Stoppa (on loan from Sampdoria)
20	MF	ITA	Simone Pontisso
21	MF	ITA	Marco Pompetti
22	GK	ITA	Edoardo Borrelli

No.	Pos.	Nation	Player
23	DF	ITA	Nicolò Brighenti
24	MF	GRE	Dimitris Sounas
25	FW	ITA	Francesco Bombagi
27	MF	BEL	Jari Vandeputte
28	FW	ITA	Tommaso Biasci
32	DF	SLO	Luka Krajnc
33	MF	ITA	Andrea Oliveri (on loan from Atalanta)
44	DF	ITA	Kevin Miranda (on loan from Sassuolo)
70	FW	ITA	Giuseppe Ambrosino (on loan from Napoli)
72	DF	ITA	Davide Veroli (on loan from Cagliari)
77	MF	GRE	Panos Katseris
92	MF	CRO	Mario Šitum
98	FW	ITA	Alfredo Donnarumma (on loan from Ternana)

=== Other players under contract ===
Note: Flags indicate national team as defined under FIFA eligibility rules; some limited exceptions apply. Players may hold more than one non-FIFA nationality.

No.	Pos.	Nation	Player
—	MF	ITA	Francesco Talarico

=== Out on loan ===
Note: Flags indicate national team as defined under FIFA eligibility rules; some limited exceptions apply. Players may hold more than one non-FIFA nationality.

No. / Pos. / Nation / Player; — / GK / ITA / Alfonso Rizzuto (at Lentigione until 30 June 2024)	No. / Pos. / Nation / Player; — / FW / ITA / Alessio Curcio (at Casertana until 30 June 2024)

== Transfers ==
=== In ===
Pos.	Player	Transferred from	Fee	Date	Source
FW	(Italy) Enrico Brignola	(Italy) Benevento	Undisclosed	1 July 2023	
MF	(Italy) Marco Pompetti	(Italy) Internazionale	Undisclosed	1 July 2023	
MF	(Italy) Luca D'Andrea	(Italy) Sassuolo		1 July 2023	
FW	(Italy) Giuseppe Ambrosino	(Italy) Napoli		1 July 2023	
FW	(Italy) Alfredo Donnarumma	(Italy) Ternana		1 July 2023	
FW	(Italy) Matteo Stoppa	(Italy) Sampdoria		1 July 2023	
MF	(Italy) Andrea Oliveri	(Italy) Atalanta		1 July 2023	
DF	(Italy) Davide Veroli	(Italy) Cagliari		1 July 2023	
DF	(Italy) Kevin Miranda	(Italy) Sassuolo		1 July 2023	
DF	(Bulgaria) Dimo Krastev	(Italy) Fiorentina	Loan	12 July 2023	
GK	(Italy) Edoardo Borrelli	(Italy) Ostiamare	Undisclosed	14 July 2023	
DF	(Slovenia) Luka Krajnc	(Germany) Hannover 96	Undisclosed	23 August 2023	
MF	(Italy) Jacopo Petriccione	(Italy) Crotone	Undisclosed	25 January 2024	

=== Out ===
Pos.	Player	Transferred to	Fee	Date	Source
DF	(Italy) Luca Martinelli	(Italy) Cerignola		1 July 2023	
FW	(Italy) Pietro Cianci	(Italy) Taranto		1 July 2023	
DF	(Italy) Alberto Tentardini	(Italy) Cerignola		1 July 2023	
MF	(Italy) Antonio Cinelli	(Italy) Sangiuliano		1 July 2023	
DF	(Italy) Pasquale Fazio	(Italy) Monopoli		1 July 2023	
DF	(Italy) Riccardo Gatti	(Italy) AlbinoLeffe		1 July 2023	
GK	(Italy) Alfonso Rizzuto	(Italy) Lentigione	Loan	1 July 2023	
MF	(Italy) Gabriele Rolando	Released		1 July 2023	
MF	(Italy) Alessio Curcio	(Italy) Casertana	Loan	8 September 2023	
FW	(Italy) Francesco Bombagi	(Italy) Mantova	Undisclosed	2 January 2024	
MF	(Ghana) Nana Welbeck	(Italy) Catania	Undisclosed	4 January 2024	
DF	(Bulgaria) Dimo Krastev	(Italy) Fiorentina	Loan return	23 January 2024	

== Competitions ==
=== Overview ===
Competition	First match	Last match	Starting round	Final position	Record							
Competition	First match	Last match	Starting round	Final position	Pld	W	D	L	GF	GA	GD	Win %
Serie B	19 August 2023	10 May 2024	Matchday 1	5th	38	17	9	12	59	50	+9	44.74
Serie B Playoffs	18 May 2024	25 May 2024	Preliminary round	Semi-finals	3	1	1	1	7	8	−1	33.33
Coppa Italia	5 August 2023	11 August 2023	Preliminary round	Round of 64	2	1	0	1	2	4	−2	50.00
Total					43	19	10	14	68	62	+6	44.19

Last updated: 18 May 2024
Source: Competitions

=== Serie B ===
==== League table ====
Pos	Team	Pld	W	D	L	GF	GA	GD	Pts	Promotion, qualification or relegation
3	Venezia (O, P)	38	21	7	10	69	46	+23	70	Qualification for promotion play-offs semi-finals
4	Cremonese	38	19	10	9	50	32	+18	67	Qualification for promotion play-offs semi-finals
5	Catanzaro	38	17	9	12	59	50	+9	60	Qualification for promotion play-offs preliminary round
6	Palermo	38	15	11	12	62	53	+9	56	Qualification for promotion play-offs preliminary round
7	Sampdoria (Note: Sampdoria were deducted 2 points due to failure in paying taxes between January and March 2023.)	38	16	9	13	53	50	+3	55	Qualification for promotion play-offs preliminary round

Source: Soccerway (in English)
Rules for classification: 1) Points; 2) Head-to-head points; 3) Head-to-head goal difference; 4) Goal difference; 5) Goals scored; 6) Draw.
(Note: Head-to-head record is used only after all the matches between the teams in question have been played)
(O) Play-off winners; (P) Promoted

==== Results summary ====
Overall								Home						Away					
Pld	W	D	L	GF	GA	GD	Pts	W	D	L	GF	GA	GD	W	D	L	GF	GA	GD
38	17	9	12	59	50	+9	60	9	4	6	34	28	+6	8	5	6	25	22	+3

Last updated: 18 May 2024.
Source: Worldfootball

==== Results by round ====
Round	1	2	3	4	5	6	7	8	9	10	11	12	13	14	15	16	17	18	19	20	21	22	23	24	25	26	27	28	29	30	31	32	33	34	35	36	37	38
Ground	A	H	H	A	H	A	H	A	A	H	A	H	A	H	A	H	A	H	A	H	A	H	A	H	H	A	H	A	H	A	A	H	A	H	A	H	A	H
Result	D	W	W	W	L	D	D	W	W	W	L	L	L	W	W	W	L	L	L	W	L	D	D	W	D	W	W	W	L	D	W	L	W	D	D	W	L	L
Position	10	6	4	3	5	6	6	6	4	3	4	5	7	6	4	4	4	6	7	6	7	7	7	6	6	6	6	5	6	6	5	5	5	5	5	5	5	5

Updated to match(es) played on 18 May 2024. Source: Worldfootball
A = Away; H = Home; W = Win; D = Draw; L = Loss

==== Matches ====
The league fixtures were unveiled on 11 July 2023.

19 August 2023 1	Cremonese	0–0	Catanzaro	Cremona
20:30 CEST (UTC+2)		Report		Stadium: Stadio Giovanni Zini; Referee: Daniele Perenzoni

27 August 2023 2	Catanzaro	2–1	Ternana	Lecce
20:30 CEST (UTC+2)	Biasci 10'; Vandeputte 89' (pen.)	Report	Raimondo 45'	Stadium: Stadio Via del mare Referee: Niccolo Baroni

30 August 2023 3	Catanzaro	3–0	Spezia	Catanzaro
20:30 CEST (UTC+2)	Biasci 52'; Nikolaou 59' (o.g.); Pompetti 73'	Report		Stadium: Stadio Nicola Ceravolo; Referee: Luca Zufferli

3 September 2023 4	Lecco	3–4	Catanzaro	Lecco
18:30 CEST (UTC+2)	Novakovich 64'; Caporale 83'; Eusepi 90+2'	Report	Iemmello 31'; Vandeputte 56'; Verna 85'; Donnarumma 88'	Stadium: Stadio Rigamonti-Ceppi; Referee: Ermanno Feliciani

17 September 2023 5	Catanzaro	0–5	Parma	Catanzaro
16:15 CEST (UTC+2)		Report	Man 18'; Benedyzcak 25' (pen.), 40'; Anthony Partipilo 47'; Čolak 84'	Stadium: Stadio Nicola Ceravolo; Referee: Gianluca Aureliano

24 September 2023 6	Bari	2–2	Catanzaro	Bari
16:15 CEST (UTC+2)	Koutsoupias 28', 57'	Report	Sounas 30'; Verna 45'	Stadium: Stadio San Nicola; Referee: Maurizio Mariani

27 September 2023 7	Catanzaro	1–1	Cittadella	Catanzaro
20:30 CEST (UTC+2)	Donnarumma 26' (pen.)	Report	Carissoni 3'	Stadium: Stadio Nicola Ceravolo; Referee: Davide Ghersini

1 October 2023 8	Sampdoria	1–2	Catanzaro	Genoa
16:15 CEST (UTC+2)	Borini 34' (pen.)	Report	Vandeputte 36'; Brignola 45'	Stadium: Stadio Luigi Ferraris; Referee: Livio Marinelli

7 October 2023 9	Südtirol	0–1	Catanzaro	Bolzano
14:00 CEST (UTC+2)		Report	Iemmello 43'	Stadium: Stadio Druso; Referee: Gianluca Manganiello

21 October 2023 10	Catanzaro	3–0	Feralpisalò	Catanzaro
16:15 CEST (UTC+2)	Vandeputte 51'; Biasci 74'; Bacchetti 78' (o.g.)	Report		Stadium: Stadio Nicola Ceravolo; Referee: Marco Monaldi

28 October 2023 11	Como	1–0	Catanzaro	Como
14:00 CEST (UTC+2)	Verdi 7'	Report		Stadium: Stadio Giuseppe Sinigaglia; Referee: Davide Di Marco

4 November 2023 12	Catanzaro	1–2	Modena	Catanzaro
14:00 CET (UTC+1)	Vandeputte 19'	Report	Manconi 27'; Bozhanaj 90+5'	Stadium: Stadio Nicola Ceravolo; Referee: Marco Di Bello

10 November 2023 13	Venezia	2–1	Catanzaro	Venice
20:30 CET (UTC+1)	Pohjanpalo 25' (pen.); Johnsen 45+1'	Report	Ghion 40'	Stadium: Stadio Pierluigi Penzo; Referee: Antonio Santoro

26 November 2023 14	Catanzaro	2–0	Cosenza	Catanzaro
16:15 CET (UTC+1)	Iemello 12'; Biasci 52'	Report		Stadium: Stadio Nicola Ceravolo; Referee: Juan Luca Sacchi

1 December 2023 15	Palermo	1–2	Catanzaro	Palermo
20:30 CET (UTC+1)	Štulac 82'	Report	Iemmello 44'; Biasci 49'	Stadium: Stadio Renzo Barbera; Referee: Livio Marinello

9 December 2023 16	Catanzaro	2–0	Pisa	Catanzaro
16:15 CET (UTC+1)	Ambrosino 53'; Marin 82' (o.g.)	Report		Stadium: Stadio Nicola Ceravolo; Referee: Davide Ghersini

16 December 2023 17	Ascoli	1–0	Catanzaro	Ascoli Piceno
16:15 CET (UTC+1)	Pedro Mendes 14'	Report		Stadium: Stadio Cino e Lillo Del Duca; Referee: Antonio Santoro

23 December 2023 18	Catanzaro	2–3	Brescia	Catanzaro
15:00 CET (UTC+1)	Ambrosino 10'; Vandeputte 13'	Report	Bjarnason 47'; Bisoli 58'; Bianchi 90+1'	Stadium: Stadio Nicola Ceravolo; Referee: Marco Piccinini

26 December 2023 19	Reggiana	1–0	Catanzaro	Reggio Emilia
12:30 CET (UTC+1)	Girma 41'	Report		Stadium: Mapei Stadium – Città del Tricolore; Referee: Giacomo Camplone

12 January 2024 20	Catanzaro	5–3	Lecco	Catanzaro
20:30 CET (UTC+1)	Verna 18'; Sounas 48', 65'; Iemmello 52'; Biasci 88'	Report	Di Stefano 25'; Lemmens 29'; Novakovich 55'	Stadium: Stadio Nicola Ceravolo; Referee: Fabio Maresca

20 January 2024 21	Feralpisalò	3–0	Catanzaro	Piacenza
14:00 CET (UTC+1)	Kourfalidis 5'; Compagnon 60'; La Mantia 90+8' (pen.)	Report		Stadium: Stadio Leonardo Garilli; Referee: Giovanni Ayroldi

26 January 2024 22	Catanzaro	1–1	Palermo	Catanzaro
20:30 CET (UTC+1)	Biasci 29'	Report	Segre 48'	Stadium: Stadio Nicola Ceravolo; Referee: Niccolo Baroni

3 February 2024 23	Spezia	1–1	Catanzaro	La Spezia
14:00 CET (UTC+1)	Jagiełło 34'	Report	Iemmello 13'	Stadium: Stadio Alberto Picco; Referee: Davide Ghersini

11 February 2024 24	Catanzaro	3–2	Ascoli	Catanzaro
16:15 CET (UTC+1)	Matias Antonini 17'; Bellusci 81' (o.g.); Iemmello 86'	Report	Mantovani 24'; Eric Botteghin 37'	Stadium: Stadio Nicola Ceravolo; Referee: Andrea Rapuano

17 February 2024 25	Catanzaro	2–2	Südtirol	Catanzaro
16:15 CET (UTC+1)	Brighenti 31'; Matias Antonini 47'	Report	Kurtić 2'; Pecorino 59'	Stadium: Stadio Nicola Ceravolo; Referee: Luca Zufferli

24 February 2024 26	Cittadella	1–2	Catanzaro	Cittadella
14:00 CET (UTC+1)	Baldini 29' (pen.)	Report	Iemmello 19', 56'	Stadium: Stadio Pier Cesare Tombolato; Referee: Federico Dionisi

27 February 2024 27	Catanzaro	2–0	Bari	Catanzaro
20:30 CET (UTC+1)	Vandeputte 4'; Iemmello 78'	Report		Stadium: Stadio Nicola Ceravolo; Referee: Ivano Pezzuto

3 March 2024 28	Cosenza	0–2	Catanzaro	Cosenza
16:15 CET (UTC+1)		Report	Iemmello 31'; Biasci 89'	Stadium: Stadio San Vito-Gigi Marulla; Referee: Michael Fabbri

9 March 2024 29	Catanzaro	0–1	Reggiana	Catanzaro
16:15 CET (UTC+1)		Report	Fulignati 12' (o.g.)	Stadium: Stadio Nicola Ceravolo; Referee: Kevin Bonacina

16 March 2024 30	Brescia	1–1	Catanzaro	Brescia
14:00 CET (UTC+1)	Borrelli 52'	Report	Biasci 45+1'	Stadium: Stadio Mario Rigamonti; Referee: Francesco Cosso

1 April 2024 31	Parma	0–2	Catanzaro	Parma
15:00 CEST (UTC+2)		Report	Biasci 11'; Matias Antonini 39'	Stadium: Stadio Ennio Tardini; Referee: Niccolo Baroni

6 April 2024 32	Catanzaro	1–2	Como	Catanzaro
16:15 CEST (UTC+2)	Vandeputte 19'	Report	Gabrielloni 62'; Da Cunha 67'	Stadium: Stadio Nicola Ceravolo; Referee: Marco Di Bello

12 April 2024 33	Modena	1–3	Catanzaro	Modena
20:30 CEST (UTC+2)	Tremolada 34'	Report	Iemmello 16', 68'; Vandeputte 25'	Stadium: Stadio Alberto Braglia; Referee: Daniele Perenzoni

20 April 2024 34	Catanzaro	0–0	Cremonese	Catanzaro
16:15 CEST (UTC+2)		Report		Stadium: Stadio Nicola Ceravolo; Referee: Federico Dionisi

26 April 2024 35	Pisa	2–2	Catanzaro	Pisa
20:30 CEST (UTC+2)	Moreo 74'; Marin 81'	Report	Pontisso 2'; Ambrosino 63'	Stadium: Arena Garibaldi; Referee: Matteo Gualtieri

1 May 2024 36	Catanzaro	3–2	Venezia	Catanzaro
15:00 CEST (UTC+2)	Pontisso 5'; Iemmello 59', 90+6' (pen.)	Report	Idzes 14', 55'	Stadium: Stadio Nicola Ceravolo; Referee: Giovanni Ayroldi

5 May 2024 37	Ternana	1–0	Catanzaro	Terni
15:00 CEST (UTC+2)	Distefano 78'	Report		Stadium: Stadio Libero Liberati; Referee: Francesco Fourneau

10 May 2024 38	Catanzaro	1–3	Sampdoria	Catanzaro
20:30 CEST (UTC+2)	Oliveri 39'	Report	Borini 4' (pen.), 57', 60'	Stadium: Stadio Nicola Ceravolo; Referee: Daniele Perenzoni

==== Promotion play-offs ====
18 May 2024 Preliminary Round	Catanzaro	4–2 (a.e.t.)	Brescia	Catanzaro
20:30 CEST (UTC+2)	Iemmello 26', 120+2'; Donnarumma 90+6'; Brignola 105'	Report	Galazzi 8'; Moncini 52'	Stadium: Nicola Ceravolo; Attendance: 12,370; Referee: Simone Sozza

21 May 2024 Semi-final First Leg	Catanzaro	2–2	Cremonese	Catanzaro
20:30 CEST (UTC+2)	Biasci 51'; Brignola 68'	Report	Tsadjout 14'; Ciofani 50'	Stadium: Nicola Ceravolo; Attendance: 12,623; Referee: Matteo Marcenaro

25 May 2024 Semi-final Second Leg	Cremonese	4–1 (6–3 agg.)	Catanzaro	Cremona
20:30 CEST (UTC+2)	Vázquez 12'; Buonaiuto 19'; Coda 37'; Sernicola 69'	Report	Antonini 80'	Stadium: Giovanni Zini; Attendance: Referee: Maurizio Mariani

=== Coppa Italia ===
5 August 2023 Preliminary round	Catanzaro	1–0	Foggia	Vibo Valentia
18:00 CEST (UTC+2)	Curcio 70'	Report		Stadium: Stadio Luigi Razza; Attendance: 0 Referee: Francesco Cosso

11 August 2023 Round of 64	Udinese	4–1	Catanzaro	Udine
18:00 CEST (UTC+2)	Lovric 9'; Beto 49'; Masina (yellow card) 51'; Thauvin 64' (pen.); Lucca 90+3'	Report	Vandeputte 12'	Stadium: Stadio Friuli; Attendance: 4,801; Referee: Daniele Minelli

== Statistics ==
=== Appearances and goals ===
No.	Pos	Nat	Player	Total		Serie B		Play-offs		Coppa Italia	
No.	Pos	Nat	Player	Apps	Goals	Apps	Goals	Apps	Goals	Apps	Goals
Goalkeepers
1	GK	(Italy) ITA	Andrea Fulignati	42	0	37	0	3	0	2	0
16	GK	(Italy) ITA	Andrea Sala	2	0	1	0	0+1	0	0	0
22	GK	(Italy) ITA	Edoardo Borrelli	0	0	0	0	0	0	0	0
12	GK	(Italy) ITA	Vincenzo Grimaldi	0	0	0	0	0	0	0	0
Defenders
4	DF	(Italy) ITA	Matias Antonini	17	4	13+1	3	3	1	0	0
14	DF	(Italy) ITA	Stefano Scognamillo	39	0	34	0	3	0	2	0
23	DF	(Italy) ITA	Nicolò Brighenti	34	1	29+1	1	2	0	2	0
32	DF	(Slovenia) SLO	Luka Krajnc	15	0	12+3	0	0	0	0	0
44	DF	(Italy) ITA	Kevin Miranda	10	0	1+9	0	0	0	0	0
72	DF	(Italy) ITA	Davide Veroli	32	0	24+4	0	2+1	0	1	0
Midfielders
8	MF	(Italy) ITA	Luca Verna	31	3	21+6	3	0+2	0	1+1	0
10	MF	(Italy) ITA	Jacopo Petriccione	19	1	13+3	1	3	0	0	0
18	MF	(Italy) ITA	Andrea Ghion	23	1	17+4	1	0	0	2	0
20	MF	(Italy) ITA	Simone Pontisso	29	2	12+12	2	3	0	1+1	0
21	MF	(Italy) ITA	Marco Pompetti	33	1	13+16	1	0+2	0	0+2	0
24	MF	(Greece) GRE	Dimitris Sounas	37	3	26+6	3	3	0	2	0
27	MF	(Belgium) BEL	Jari Vandeputte	41	9	36	9	3	0	2	0
33	MF	(Italy) ITA	Andrea Oliveri	30	1	6+20	1	2+1	0	0+1	0
92	MF	(Croatia) CRO	Mario Šitum	29	0	23+4	0	0	0	2	0
Forwards
7	FW	(Italy) ITA	Luca D'Andrea	25	0	6+17	0	0	0	0+2	0
9	FW	(Italy) ITA	Pietro Iemmello	38	17	31+4	15	3	2	0	0
17	FW	(Italy) ITA	Enrico Brignola	22	3	3+14	1	0+3	2	2	0
19	FW	(Italy) ITA	Matteo Stoppa	26	0	4+19	0	0+3	0	0	0
28	FW	(Italy) ITA	Tommaso Biasci	41	11	25+11	10	3	1	1+1	0
63	FW	(Italy) ITA	Giacint Rafele	1	0	0+1	0	0	0	0	0
70	FW	(Italy) ITA	Giuseppe Ambrosino	28	3	13+15	3	0	0	0	0
98	FW	(Italy) ITA	Alfredo Donnarumma	23	3	5+15	2	0+3	1	0	0
41	FW	(Italy) ITA	Alessandro Viotti	0	0	0	0	0	0	0	0
	FW	(Italy) ITA	Dario Violante	0	0	0	0	0	0	0	0
Players transferred out during the season
10	FW	(Italy) ITA	Alessio Curcio	2	1	0	0	0	0	1+1	1
25	FW	(Italy) ITA	Francesco Bombagi	1	0	0	0	0	0	0+1	0
5	DF	(Bulgaria) BUL	Dimo Krastev	3	0	1+1	0	0	0	1	0
6	MF	(Ghana) GHA	Nana Welbeck	0	0	0	0	0	0	0	0
77	MF	(Greece) GRE	Panos Katseris	15	0	12+3	0	0	0	0	0
	FW	(Ivory Coast) CIV	Moussa Bamba	0	0	0	0	0	0	0	0
32	MF	(Italy) ITA	Cristiano Belpanno	0	0	0	0	0	0	0	0

Source: Competitions
