= 2025–26 Ternana Calcio season =

Football club's 2025-26 season

Ternana Calcio
2025–26 season
- Chairman: Claudia Rizzo (from 15 September)
- Manager: Fabio Liverani
- Stadium: Stadio Libero Liberati
- Serie C Group B: 9th
- Coppa Italia: Preliminary round
- Coppa Italia Serie C: Second round
- Biggest win: Rimini 1–4 Ternana
- Biggest defeat: Virtus Entella 4–0 Ternana

The 2025–26 season is the 101st in the history of Ternana Calcio and the club's second consecutive season in Serie C. In addition to the domestic league, Ternana competes in the Coppa Italia and the Coppa Italia Serie C. The season began on 9 August 2025.

== Squad ==
=== Transfers In ===
Pos.	Player	Transferred from	Fee	Date	Source
FW	(Italy) Pietro Cianci	(Italy) Catania	€55,000	1 July 2025	
FM	(Italy) Samuele Damiani	(Italy) Palermo	€180,000	1 July 2025	
MF	(Republic of Ireland) Ed McJannet	(Italy) Lecce	Loan	23 July 2025	
FW	(Italy) Marco Longoni	(Italy) Torino U20	Free	6 August 2025	
FW	(Italy) Riccardo Semeraro	(Italy) Parma U18	Loan	8 August 2025	
MF	(Italy) Mattia Proietti	(Italy) Gubbio	Undisclosed	9 August 2025	
MF	(Italy) Filippo Tripi	Unattached	Free	20 August 2025	
MF	(Republic of Ireland) Liam Kerrigan	(Italy) Como	Undisclosed	21 August 2025	
DF	(Albania) Angelo Ndreçka	(Italy) Virtus Entella	Undisclosed	26 August 2025	
DF	(France) Côme Bianay Balcot	(Italy) Torino	Loan	30 August 2025	
FW	(Bulgaria) Mert Durmush	(Italy) Pisa	Loan	1 September 2025	
FW	(Lithuania) Edgaras Dubickas	(Italy) Pisa	Undisclosed	1 September 2025	
DF	(Italy) Biagio Meccariello	(Italy) Benevento	Undisclosed	1 September 2025	
GK	(Italy) Francesco D'Alterio	(Italy) Crotone	Undisclosed	1 September 2025	
MF	(Italy) Marco Garetto	(Italy) Rimini	Free	1 September 2025	
FW	(Italy) Simone Leonardi	(Italy) Catania	Loan	1 September 2025	

=== Transfers Out ===
Pos.	Player	Transferred to	Fee	Date	Source
FW	(Italy) Pietro Cianci	(Italy) Catania	Loan return	30 June 2025	
DF	(Bulgaria) Dimo Krastev	(Italy) Fiorentina	Loan return	30 June 2025	
MF	(Italy) Emanuele Cicerelli	(Italy) Catania	Loan return	30 June 2025	
MF	(Italy) Aaron Ciammaglichella	(Italy) Torino	Loan return	30 June 2025	
MF	(Netherlands) Kees de Boer	(Italy) Salernitana	Undisclosed	8 July 2025	
DF	(Argentina) Tiago Casasola	(Italy) Catania	Free	12 July 2025	
FW	(Italy) Pietro Cianci	(Italy) Arezzo	€100,000	4 August 2025	
DF	(Italy) Nicolò Fazzi	(Italy) Gubbio	Free	9 August 2025	
MF	(Italy) Salvatore Aloi	(Italy) Catania	Free	9 August 2025	
MF	(Italy) Samuele Damiani	(Italy) Ascoli	€180,000	13 August 2025	
FW	(Italy) Alessio Curcio	(Italy) Team Altamura	Free	23 August 2025	
DF	(Italy) Fabio Tito	(Italy) Arezzo	Undisclosed	26 August 2025	
FW	(Italy) Alfredo Donnarumma	(Italy) Lumezzane	Loan	28 August 2025	
DF	(Italy) Marco Bellavigna	(Italy) Siena	Loan	30 August 2025	
FW	(Italy) Pietro Rovaglia		Contract terminated	1 September 2025	

== Friendlies ==
21 July 2025	Ternana	23–0	GRS Terni Papigno
	Turella; Cianci; Romeo; Damiani; Donnarumma; Aloi; Garau; Viviani; Ferrante; Curcio	Report

22 July 2025	Ternana	18–0	Campitello	Terni
	Capuano; Turella; Brignola; Damiani; Donati; Valenti; Maestrelli; Curcio; Ferrante; Romeo; Viviani; Garau; Donnarumma	Report		Stadium: Stadio Libero Liberati

13 August 2025	Ternana	2–0	Terni FC	Arrone
18:00	28' (o.g.); Donnarumma 53'	Report		Stadium: Campo Sportivo di Arrone

== Competitions ==
=== Overall record ===
Competition	First match	Last match	Starting round	Final position	Record							
Competition	First match	Last match	Starting round	Final position	Pld	W	D	L	GF	GA	GD	Win %
Serie C	22 August 2025	26 April 2026	Matchday 1		5	2	1	2	7	5	+2	40.00
Coppa Italia	9 August 2025		Preliminary round	Preliminary round	1	0	0	1	0	4	−4	0.00
Coppa Italia Serie C	28–30 October 2025		Second round		0	0	0	0	0	0	+0	—
Total					6	2	1	3	7	9	−2	33.33

Last updated: 20 September 2025
Source: Competitions

=== Serie C ===
Group B

==== Results summary ====
Overall								Home						Away					
Pld	W	D	L	GF	GA	GD	Pts	W	D	L	GF	GA	GD	W	D	L	GF	GA	GD
5	2	1	2	7	5	+2	7	1	0	1	2	2	0	1	1	1	5	3	+2

Last updated: 20 September 2025.

==== Results by round ====
Round	1	2	3	4	5	6
Ground	A	H	A	H	A	H
Result	L	L	W	W	D	
Position	16	18	13	6	9	

Updated to match(es) played on 20 September 2025. Source:
A = Away; H = Home; W = Win; D = Draw; L = Loss

==== Matches ====
The competition draw was held on 28 July 2025.

22 August 2025 1	Livorno	1–0	Ternana	Livorno
21:15 UTC+2	Marchesi 49'			Stadium: Stadio Armando Picchi; Attendance: 12,000; Referee: Edoardo Gianquinto

31 August 2025 2	Ternana	0–2	Ascoli	Terni
21:00 UTC+2			D'Uffizi 7'; Del Sole 45'	Stadium: Stadio Libero Liberati; Attendance: 3,345; Referee: Maksym Frasynyak

7 September 2025 3	Rimini	1–4	Ternana	Rimini
20:30 UTC+2	Lepri 30'		Balcot 5'; Ferrante 45+2'; Dubickas 45+6'; Orellana 58' (pen.)	Stadium: Stadio Romeo Neri; Attendance: 457; Referee: Felipe Salvatore Viapiana

14 September 2025 4	Ternana	2–0	Carpi	Terni
20:30 UTC+2	Ferrante 4'; Sorzi 63' (o.g.)			Stadium: Stadio Libero Liberati; Attendance: 2,970; Referee: Giorgio Di Cicco

20 September 2025 5	Torres	1–1	Ternana	Sassari
15:00 UTC+2				Stadium: Stadio Vanni Sanna; Referee: Nicolò Dorillo

23 September 2025 6	Ternana	v	Pontedera	Terni
18:30 UTC+2				Stadium: Stadio Libero Liberati

=== Coppa Italia ===
9 August 2025 Preliminary round	Virtus Entella	4–0	Ternana	Chiavari
20:30 UTC+2	Russo 16'; Franzoni 59'; Fumagalli 70'; Di Mario 85'			Stadium: Stadio Enrico Sannazzari; Referee: Alberto Poli

=== Coppa Italia Serie C ===
28 October 2025 Second round	Ternana	v	Campobasso
20:30 UTC+2
