= 2022–23 Coppa Italia Serie C =

Tournament details
- Country: Italy
- Dates: 4 October 2022 – 11 April 2023
- Teams: 60

Final positions
- Champions: Vicenza
- Runners-up: Juventus Next Gen

Tournament statistics
- Matches played: 62
- Goals scored: 156 (2.52 per match)
- Top goal scorer: Franco Ferrari(5 goals)

The 2022–23 Coppa Italia Serie C was the 50th season of the Coppa Italia Serie C, the cup competition for Serie C clubs.

Padova were the defending champions having won their second title in April 2022 against Südtirol, with a 1–0 final score in the 2021-22 Coppa Italia Serie C final.

== Participating teams ==
=== Group A (20 teams) ===
- AlbinoLeffe
- Arzignano
- Feralpisalò
- Juventus Next Gen
- Lecco
- Mantova
- Novara
- Padova
- Pergolettese
- Piacenza
- Pordenone
- Pro Patria
- Pro Sesto
- Pro Vercelli
- Renate
- Sangiuliano
- Trento
- Triestina
- Vicenza
- V. Verona

=== Group B (20 teams) ===
- Alessandria
- Ancona
- Carrarese
- Cesena
- Fermana
- Fiorenzuola
- Gubbio
- Imolese
- Lucchese
- Montevarchi
- Olbia
- Pontedera
- Recanatese
- Reggiana
- Rimini
- San Donato
- Siena
- Torres
- Entella
- Vis Pesaro

=== Group C (20 teams) ===
- Cerignola
- Avellino
- Catanzaro
- Crotone
- Andria
- Foggia
- Gelbison
- Giugliano
- Juve Stabia
- Latina
- Messina
- Monopoli
- Monterosi
- Pescara
- Picerno
- Potenza
- Taranto
- Turris
- Francavilla
- Viterbese

== Format and seeding ==
The 60 teams in the 2022–23 Serie C entered the competition at various stages, as follows:

- First phase (one-legged fixtures)
  - First round (one-legged): it is contested by the 56 teams who do not participate in the Coppa Italia.
  - Second round (one-legged): it is contested by the 28 winners of the first round and the four teams that participate in Coppa Italia.
- Second phase
  - Round of 16 (one-legged): it is contested by the 16 winners of the second round.
  - Quarter-finals (one-legged)
  - Semi-finals (two-legged)
- Final (two-legged)

== Round dates ==
Phase	Round	First leg	Second leg
First stage	First round	4,5 & 12 October 2022	
First stage	Second round	1-3 November 2022	
Final stage	Round of 16	15-17 November 2022	
Final stage	Quarter-finals	7 December 2022	
Final stage	Semi-finals	18 January 2023	15 February 2023
Final stage	Final	2 March 2023	11 April 2023
