= 2022–23 Serie C =

Serie C
- Season: 2022–23
- Dates: Regular season: 3 September 2022 – 23 April 2023; Play-offs: 11 May 2023 – 18 June 2023
- Promoted: Feralpisalò; Reggiana; Catanzaro; Lecco (via play-off)
- Relegated: Sangiuliano City; Piacenza; San Donato Tavarnelle; Imolese; Montevarchi; Gelbison; Viterbese; Fidelis Andria; Pordenone (default); Siena (default)
- Matches: 1,140
- Goals: 2,645 (2.32 per match)
- Top goalscorer: Pietro Iemmello (28 goals)
- Biggest home win: Catanzaro 6–0 Monopoli (19 February 2023)
- Biggest away win: San Donato Tavarnelle 1–6 Cesena (6 April 2023)
- Highest scoring: Pontedera 5–4 Olbia (23 December 2022)
- Longest winning run: 7 matches Reggiana (19–25)
- Longest unbeaten run: 26 matches Catanzaro (1–26)
- Longest winless run: 15 matches Fidelis Andria (16–30); Fiorenzuola (24–38)
- Longest losing run: 7 matches AlbinoLeffe (27–33)
- Highest attendance: 20,368; Pescara 2–2 Foggia (Play-offs)
- Lowest attendance: 21; Juventus Next Gen 0–3 Virtus Verona
- Total attendance: 2,374,931
- Average attendance: 2,011

The 2022–23 Serie C was the 64th season of the Serie C, the third tier of the Italian football league system, organized by the Lega Pro.

== Changes ==
The league will be composed by 60 teams, geographically divided into three different groups. The group composition will be decided and formalized by the Serie C league committee between July and August.

The following teams have changed division since the 2021–22 season:

=== To Serie C ===
Relegated from Serie B

- Vicenza
- Alessandria
- Crotone
- Pordenone

Promoted from Serie D

- Novara (Group A winners)
- Sangiuliano City Nova (Group B winners)
- Arzignano (Group C winners)
- Rimini (Group D winners)
- San Donato Tavarnelle (Group E winners)
- Recanatese (Group F winners)
- Giugliano (Group G winners)
- Audace Cerignola (Group H winners)
- Gelbison (Group I winners)
- Torres (Group G play-off winners, admitted)

=== From Serie C ===
Promoted to Serie B

- Südtirol
- Modena
- Bari
- Palermo

Relegated to Serie D

- Seregno
- Giana Erminio
- Legnago
- Teramo (excluded)
- Pistoiese
- Grosseto
- Campobasso (excluded)
- Paganese
- Vibonese
- Catania (excluded)

=== Vacancies ===
On 1 July 2022, the Co.Vi.So.C. rejected the league applications of Teramo and Campobasso. Both exclusions were confirmed on appeal on 8 July 2022, with both teams announcing their intention to request one further appeal in front of the Italian National Olympic Committee sports magistrature, which was rejected.

The appeal at TAR of Lazio was rejected on 3 August 2022, leading the football league to confirm the repechages of Fermana and Torres. However, later on 4 August 2022, the Council of State suspended the exclusion of Campobasso, with a final appeal sentence scheduled on 25 August; as a direct consequence, the Lega Pro football league postponed indefinitely the announcement of the fixture list. On 26 August 2022, the Council of State finally confirmed the exclusion of both Campobasso and Teramo.

=== Name changes ===
On 26 August 2022, Juventus Under-23 (Juventus's reserve team) changed its name to Juventus Next Gen.

== Group A (North) ==
=== Stadia and locations ===
9 teams from Lombardy, 4 team from Veneto, 3 teams from Piedmont, 2 teams from Friuli-Venezia Giulia, 1 team from Emilia-Romagna and 1 team from Trentino-South Tyrol.

Location of teams in 2022–23 Serie C (Group A)
Location of teams in 2022–23 Serie C (Group A) (Lombardy)

Club	City	Stadium	Capacity
AlbinoLeffe	Albino and Leffe	AlbinoLeffe Stadium (Zanica)	1,791
Arzignano Valchiampo	Arzignano	Dal Molin	1,500
Feralpisalò	Salò and Lonato del Garda	Lino Turina	2,364
Juventus Next Gen	Turin	Giuseppe Moccagatta (Alessandria)	5,926
Lecco	Lecco	Rigamonti-Ceppi	4,997
Mantova	Mantua	Danilo Martelli	14,884
Novara	Novara	Silvio Piola (Novara)	17,875
Padova	Padua	Euganeo	32,420
Pergolettese	Crema	Giuseppe Voltini	4,095
Piacenza	Piacenza	Leonardo Garilli	21,668
Pordenone	Pordenone	Guido Teghil (Lignano Sabbiadoro)	5,000
Pro Patria	Busto Arsizio	Carlo Speroni	5,000
Pro Sesto	Sesto San Giovanni	Breda	4,500
Pro Vercelli	Vercelli	Silvio Piola (Vercelli)	5,505
Renate	Renate	Città di Meda (Meda)	2,500
Sangiuliano City	San Giuliano Milanese	Ferruccio (Seregno)	3,700
Trento	Trento	Briamasco	4,200
Triestina	Trieste	Nereo Rocco	26,500
Vicenza	Vicenza	Romeo Menti	17,163
Virtus Verona	Verona	Mario Gavagnin-Sinibaldo Nocini	1,500

=== Table ===
Pos	Team	Pld	W	D	L	GF	GA	GD	Pts	Qualification
1	Feralpisalò (C, P)	38	20	11	7	41	21	+20	71	Promotion to Serie B. Qualification for the Supercoppa di Serie C
2	Pordenone (E)	38	16	14	8	53	35	+18	62 (Note: Pordenone ahead of Lecco due to head-to-head matches: POR-LEC 5-0; LEC-POR 0-0)	Excluded
3	Lecco (O, P)	38	17	11	10	45	40	+5	62	Qualification for the promotion play-offs national phase
4	Pro Sesto	38	16	12	10	46	45	+1	60	Qualification for the promotion play-offs group phase (Note: Since Vicenza, the winners of the 2022-23 Coppa Italia Serie C, finished within the top 10 places in the group, Pergolettese, the 11-th placed team, qualifies for the group phase of the promotion play-offs.)
5	Padova	38	15	14	9	47	40	+7	59	Qualification for the promotion play-offs group phase
6	Virtus Verona	38	15	13	10	46	30	+16	58 (Note: Virtus Verona ahead of Vicenza due to goal difference in head-to-head matches: VVE-VIC 1-2; VIC-VVE 0-2)	Qualification for the promotion play-offs group phase
7	Vicenza (Note: Vicenza qualified to the national phase of the promotion play-offs by winning the 2022-23 Coppa Italia Serie C.)	38	17	7	14	64	47	+17	58	Qualification for the promotion play-offs national phase
8	Renate	38	14	11	13	49	55	−6	53 (Note: Renate ahead of Arzignano Valchiampo due to head-to-head matches: REN-ARZ 3-0; ARZ-REN 2-3)	Qualification for the promotion play-offs group phase
9	Arzignano Valchiampo	38	13	14	11	43	38	+5	53	Qualification for the promotion play-offs group phase
10	Novara	38	15	7	16	48	45	+3	52	Qualification for the promotion play-offs group phase
11	Pergolettese	38	14	9	15	43	42	+1	51	Qualification for the promotion play-offs group phase
12	Pro Patria	38	13	11	14	37	43	−6	50	
13	Juventus Next Gen	38	13	10	15	42	48	−6	49	
14	Trento	38	12	10	16	40	42	−2	46 (Note: Trento ahead of Pro Vercelli due to head-to-head matches: TRE-PVE 4-1; PVE-TRE 1-2)	
15	Pro Vercelli	38	12	10	16	38	47	−9	46	
16	Mantova (T)	38	12	9	17	48	62	−14	45	Readmitted
17	Sangiuliano City (R)	38	12	6	20	38	46	−8	42	Qualification for the relegation play-outs
18	Triestina (O)	38	9	12	17	31	45	−14	39	Qualification for the relegation play-outs
19	AlbinoLeffe (O)	38	9	11	18	43	54	−11	38 (Note: AlbinoLeffe ahead of Piacenza due to general goal difference. Head-to-head matches: PIA-ALB 2-2; ALB-PIA 1-1)	Qualification for the relegation play-outs
20	Piacenza (R)	38	8	14	16	42	59	−17	38	Relegation to Serie D

Updated to match(es) played on 16 April 2023. Source: Lega Pro, Soccerway (in English)
Rules for classification: 1) Points; 2) Head-to-head points; 3) Head-to-head goal difference; 4) Goal difference; 5) Goals scored; 6) Lower goals against; 7) Wins; 8) Lower losses; 9) Away wins; 10) Lower home losses.
(C) Champions; (E) Eliminated; (O) Play-off winners; (P) Promoted; (R) Relegated; (T) Qualified, but not yet for the particular phase indicated

== Group B (Centre) ==
=== Stadia and locations ===
6 teams from Tuscany, 5 teams from Emilia-Romagna, 4 teams from Marche, 2 teams from Sardinia. 1 team from Liguria, 1 team from Piedmont and 1 team from Umbria.

Location of teams in 2022–23 Serie C (Group B)
Location of teams in 2022–23 Serie C (Group B) (Tuscany)

Club	City	Stadium	Capacity
Alessandria	Alessandria	Giuseppe Moccagatta	6,000
Ancona	Ancona	Del Conero	23,976
Carrarese	Carrara	Dei Marmi	9,500
Cesena	Cesena	Orogel Stadium-Dino Manuzzi	20,194
Fermana	Fermo	Bruno Recchioni	8,920
Fiorenzuola	Fiorenzuola d'Arda	Comunale di Fiorenzuola d'Arda	4,000
Gubbio	Gubbio	Pietro Barbetti	4,939
Imolese	Imola	Romeo Galli	4,000
Lucchese	Lucca	Porta Elisa	12,800
Montevarchi	Montevarchi	Gastone Brilli Peri	4,500
Olbia	Olbia	Bruno Nespoli	4,000
Pontedera	Pontedera	Ettore Mannucci	2,700
Recanatese	Recanati	Helvia Recina (Macerata)	4,315
Reggiana	Reggio Emilia	Mapei Stadium – Città del Tricolore	21,525
Rimini	Rimini	Romeo Neri	9,768
San Donato Tavarnelle	Barberino Tavarnelle	Gastone Brilli Peri (Montevarchi)	4,500
Siena	Siena	Artemio Franchi	15,373
Torres	Sassari	Vanni Sanna	7,480
Virtus Entella	Chiavari	Comunale di Chiavari	5,587
Vis Pesaro	Pesaro	Tonino Benelli	4,898

=== Table ===
Pos	Team	Pld	W	D	L	GF	GA	GD	Pts	Qualification
1	Reggiana (C, P)	38	24	9	5	63	27	+36	81	Promotion to Serie B. Qualification for the Supercoppa di Serie C
2	Cesena	38	23	10	5	66	24	+42	79 (Note: Cesena ahead of Virtus Entella due to head-to-head matches: ENT-CES 0-0; CES-ENT 4-0)	Qualification for the promotion play-offs national phase
3	Virtus Entella	38	23	10	5	60	31	+29	79	Qualification for the promotion play-offs national phase
4	Carrarese	38	18	8	12	51	42	+9	62	Qualification for the promotion play-offs group phase
5	Gubbio	38	17	10	11	50	34	+16	61	Qualification for the promotion play-offs group phase
6	Pontedera	38	16	12	10	48	39	+9	60	Qualification for the promotion play-offs group phase
7	Ancona	38	16	10	12	55	44	+11	58	Qualification for the promotion play-offs group phase
8	Lucchese	38	12	15	11	36	32	+4	51	Qualification for the promotion play-offs group phase
9	Siena (Note: 2 point deducted due to unpaid income tax on players' salaries.) (E)	38	11	17	10	40	40	0	48	Expelled
10	Rimini	38	11	14	13	43	41	+2	47 (Note: Rimini ahead of Recanatese due to general goal difference. Head-to-head matches: REC-RIM 0-1; RIM-REC 1-2)	Qualification for the promotion play-offs group phase
11	Recanatese	38	11	14	13	39	43	−4	47	
12	Fermana	38	9	17	12	43	49	−6	44	
13	Olbia	38	9	14	15	43	50	−7	41 (Note: Olbia ahead of Fiorenzuola and Torres due to head-to-head matches: Head-to-head points in matches: OLB: 7 pts, FIO: 6 pts, TOR: 4 pts)	
14	Fiorenzuola	38	11	8	19	31	44	−13	41 (Note: Fiorenzuola behind of Olbia and ahead of Torres due to head-to-head matches: Head-to-head points in matches: OLB: 7 pts, FIO: 6 pts, TOR: 4 pts)	
15	Torres	38	8	17	13	33	36	−3	41 (Note: Torres behind of Olbia and Fiorenzuola due to head-to-head matches: Head-to-head points in matches: OLB: 7 pts, FIO: 6 pts, TOR: 4 pts)	
16	Vis Pesaro	38	9	12	17	24	55	−31	39	
17	Alessandria (O)	38	9	11	18	33	52	−19	38	Qualification for the relegation play-outs
18	San Donato Tavarnelle (R)	38	8	13	17	40	62	−22	37	Qualification for the relegation play-outs
19	Imolese (Note: 6 points deducted due to unpaid income tax on players' salaries.) (R)	38	9	9	20	29	55	−26	30	Relegation to Serie D
20	Montevarchi (R)	38	6	10	22	32	59	−27	28	Relegation to Serie D

Updated to match(es) played on 6 April 2023. Source: Lega Pro, Soccerway (in English)
Rules for classification: 1) Points; 2) Head-to-head points; 3) Head-to-head goal difference; 4) Goal difference; 5) Goals scored; 6) Lower goals against; 7) Wins; 8) Lower losses; 9) Away wins; 10) Lower home losses.
(C) Champions; (E) Eliminated; (O) Play-off winners; (P) Promoted; (R) Relegated

== Group C (South) ==
=== Stadia and locations ===
6 teams from Apulia, 5 teams from Campania, 3 teams from Lazio, 2 teams from Basilicata, 2 teams from Calabria, 1 team from Abruzzo and 1 team from Sicily.

Location of teams in 2022–23 Serie C (Group C)
Location of teams in 2022–23 Serie C (Group C) (Campania)
Location of teams in 2022–23 Serie C (Group C) (Basilicata)

Club	City	Stadium	Capacity
Audace Cerignola	Cerignola	Domenico Monterisi	7,453
Avellino	Avellino	Partenio-Adriano Lombardi	26,308
Catanzaro	Catanzaro	Nicola Ceravolo	14,679
Crotone	Crotone	Ezio Scida	16,640
Fidelis Andria	Andria	Degli Ulivi	12,000
Foggia	Foggia	Pino Zaccheria	25,085
Gelbison	Vallo della Lucania	Marcello Torre (Pagani)	5,093
Giugliano	Giugliano in Campania	Partenio-Adriano Lombardi (Avellino)	26,308
Juve Stabia	Castellammare di Stabia	Romeo Menti	7,642
Latina	Latina	Domenico Francioni	9,310
Messina	Messina	San Filippo-Franco Scoglio	38,722
Monopoli	Monopoli	Vito Simone Veneziani	6,880
Monterosi Tuscia	Monterosi	Enrico Rocchi (Viterbo); Ettore Mannucci (Note: Until matchday 12.) (Pontedera)	6,800; 2,700
Pescara	Pescara	Adriatico – Giovanni Cornacchia	20,515
Picerno	Picerno	Donato Curcio	1,500
Potenza	Potenza	Alfredo Viviani	4,977
Taranto	Taranto	Erasmo Iacovone	27,584
Turris	Torre del Greco	Amerigo Liguori	6,600
Virtus Francavilla	Francavilla Fontana	Nuovarredo Arena	3,360
Viterbese	Viterbo	Enrico Rocchi	6,800

=== Table ===
Pos	Team	Pld	W	D	L	GF	GA	GD	Pts	Qualification
1	Catanzaro (P)	38	30	6	2	102	21	+81	96	Promotion to Serie B. Qualification for the Supercoppa di Serie C
2	Crotone	38	23	11	4	57	31	+26	80	Qualification for the promotion play-offs national phase
3	Pescara	38	19	8	11	58	42	+16	65	Qualification for the promotion play-offs national phase
4	Foggia	38	18	7	13	60	44	+16	61	Qualification for the promotion play-offs group phase
5	Audace Cerignola	38	16	12	10	48	41	+7	60	Qualification for the promotion play-offs group phase
6	Picerno	38	15	14	9	40	34	+6	59	Qualification for the promotion play-offs group phase
7	Monopoli	38	16	6	16	46	48	−2	54	Qualification for the promotion play-offs group phase
8	Latina	38	12	13	13	39	46	−7	49	Qualification for the promotion play-offs group phase
9	Potenza	38	10	18	10	49	57	−8	48	Qualification for the promotion play-offs group phase
10	Juve Stabia	38	12	10	16	37	49	−12	46 (Note: Juve Stabia ahead of Taranto and Giugliano due to head-to-head matches: Head-to-head points in matches: JUV: 7 pts, TAR: 5 pts, GIU: 4 pts)	Qualification for the promotion play-offs group phase
11	Taranto	38	11	13	14	26	36	−10	46 (Note: Taranto is behind Juve Stabia and ahead of Giugliano due to head-to-head matches: Head-to-head points in matches: JUV: 7 pts, TAR: 5 pts, GIU: 4 pts)	
12	Giugliano	38	11	13	14	51	61	−10	46 (Note: Giugliano is behind Juve Stabia and Giugliano due to head-to-head matches: Head-to-head points in matches: JUV: 7 pts, TAR: 5 pts, GIU: 4 pts)	
13	Virtus Francavilla	38	13	6	19	47	54	−7	45	
14	Avellino	38	11	10	17	42	49	−7	43 (Note: Avellino ahead of Turris due to goal difference in head-to-head matches: TUR-AVE 1-3; AVE-TUR 0-1)	
15	Turris	38	11	10	17	40	56	−16	43	
16	Monterosi Tuscia (Note: Monterosi Tuscia were deducted two points due to unpaid income tax on players' salaries.)	38	10	14	14	39	45	−6	42	
17	Messina (O)	38	11	8	19	32	47	−15	41	Qualification for the relegation play-outs
18	Gelbison (R)	38	7	15	16	25	40	−15	36	Qualification for the relegation play-outs
19	Viterbese (Note: Viterbese were deducted two points as a penalty by the Disciplinary Section of the National Federal Court.) (R)	38	8	11	19	35	52	−17	33 (Note: Viterbese ahead of Fidelis Andria due to general goal difference. Head-to-head matches: VIT-AND 2-2; AND-VIT 1-1)	Relegation to Serie D
20	Fidelis Andria (R)	38	6	15	17	29	49	−20	33	Relegation to Serie D

Updated to match(es) played on 16 April 2023. Source: Lega Pro, Soccerway (in English)
Rules for classification: 1) Points; 2) Head-to-head points; 3) Head-to-head goal difference; 4) Goal difference; 5) Goals scored; 6) Lower goals against; 7) Wins; 8) Lower losses; 9) Away wins; 10) Lower home losses.
(O) Play-off winners; (P) Promoted; (R) Relegated

== Promotion play-offs ==
Rules and dates were announced on 6 March 2023. The first play-off matches were delayed to 11 May because of decision about Siena penalization not arriving before 30 April.

=== Group play-offs ===
==== Group play-offs first round ====
Matches were played on 11 May 2023.

Team 1	Score	Team 2
Padova	1–0	Pergolettese
Virtus Verona	3–0	Novara
Renate	0–0	Arzignano Valchiampo
Gubbio	1–1	Recanatese
Pontedera	2–1	Rimini
Ancona	1–1	Lucchese
Audace Cerignola	3–0	Juve Stabia
Picerno	0–1	Potenza
Monopoli	1–0	Latina

==== Group play-offs second round ====
Matches were played on 14 May 2023.

Team 1	Score	Team 2
Pro Sesto	1–1	Renate
Padova	0–1	Virtus Verona
Carrarese	0–1	Ancona
Gubbio	1–1	Pontedera
Foggia	1–1	Potenza
Audace Cerignola	2–1	Monopoli

=== National play-offs ===
==== National play-offs first round ====
The first legs were played on 18 May 2023 and the second legs were played on 22 May 2023.

Team 1	Agg.	Team 2	1st leg	2nd leg
Ancona	3–3	Lecco	2–2	1–1
Gubbio	3–3	Virtus Entella	2–0	1–3
Virtus Verona	3–5	Pescara	2–2	1–3
Pro Sesto	2–3	Vicenza	2–1	0–2
Audace Cerignola	4–4	Foggia	4–1	0–3

==== National play-offs second round ====
The first legs were played on 27 May 2023 and the second legs were played on 31 May 2023.

Team 1	Agg.	Team 2	1st leg	2nd leg
Lecco	3–2	Pordenone	0–1	3–1
Vicenza	0–0	Cesena	0–0	0–0
Foggia	3–2	Crotone	1–0	2–2
Pescara	5–3	Virtus Entella	2–1	3–2

=== Final Four ===
The semi-finals legs were played on 4 and 8 June 2023 and the final legs were played on 13 and 18 June 2023.

Semi-finals
4	Foggia (p)	2	2	4 (4)
3	Pescara	2	2	4 (3)
3	Lecco (p)	1	1	2 (5)
2	Cesena	2	0	2 (3)

Final
4	Foggia	1	1	2
3	Lecco	2	3	5

Lecco promoted to Serie B.

== Relegation play-outs ==
The first legs were played on 6 May 2023 and the second legs were played on 13 May 2023.

Team 1	Agg.	Team 2	1st leg	2nd leg
AlbinoLeffe	2–1	Mantova	1–0	1–1
Triestina	2–1	Sangiuliano City	0–0	2–1
San Donato Tavarnelle	2–3	Alessandria	1–2	1–1
Gelbison	1–1	Messina	1–0	0–1

== Top goalscorers ==
Rank	Player	Club	Goals
1	(Italy) Pietro Iemmello	Catanzaro	28
2	(Argentina) Franco Ferrari	Vicenza	19
2	(Argentina) Facundo Lescano	Pescara	19
2	(Italy) Cosimo Patierno	Virtus Francavilla	19
2	(Italy) Daniele Ragatzu	Olbia	19
6	(Italy) Simone Corazza	Cesena	18
7	(Italy) Salvatore Caturano	Potenza	17
7	(Italy) Claudio Santini^{1}	Rimini	17
9	(Italy) Tommaso Biasci	Catanzaro	16
9	(Albania) Silvio Merkaj^{3}	Virtus Entella	16

Note

^{1} Player scored 1 goal in the play-offs.
^{3} Player scored 3 goals in the play-offs.

== Attendances ==
The top 10 clubs with the highest average home attendance:

#	Club	Average
1	Cesena	8,793
2	Catanzaro	7,637
3	Vizenca	7,431
4	Reggiana	6,232
5	Triestina	5,034
6	Foggia	4,768
7	Crotone	4,453
8	Pescara	3,845
9	Avellino	3,577
10	Padova	2,971
