= Erasmo Mulè =

Italian footballer (born 1999)

Personal information
- Date of birth: 13 June 1999 (age 27)
- Place of birth: Alcamo, Italy
- Height: 1.87 m (6 ft 2 in)
- Position: Defender

Team information
- Current team: Guidonia
- Number: 13

Youth career
- –2016: Palermo
- 2016–2017: Trapani
- 2017: Parma
- 2017: → Recanatese (loan)
- 2018: Trapani

Senior career*
Years	Team	Apps	(Gls)
2017	Parma	0	(0)
2017	→ Recanatese (loan)	5	(0)
2018–2019	Trapani	17	(1)
2019	Sampdoria	0	(0)
2019	→ Trapani (loan)	6	(0)
2019–2023	Juventus	0	(0)
2019–2020	→ Juventus U23 (res.)	13	(1)
2020–2021	→ Juve Stabia (loan)	23	(0)
2021–2022	→ Cesena (loan)	18	(1)
2022–2023	→ Catanzaro (loan)	1	(1)
2023	→ Monopoli (loan)	17	(3)
2023–2025	Avellino	13	(1)
2024–2025	→ Pescara (loan)	5	(0)
2025	→ Trapani (loan)	7	(0)
2025–	Guidonia	24	(0)
- * Club domestic league appearances and goals as of 30 April 2026

Erasmo Mulè (born 13 June 1999) is an Italian professional footballer who plays as a defender for Serie C Group B club Guidonia.

== Club career ==
He made his senior debut in the 2017–18 season with Serie D club Recanatese.

On 16 July 2018, he signed a technical training contract with Trapani. He made his Serie C debut for Trapani on 18 September 2018 in a game against Reggina, as a starter.

On 16 January 2019, he signed with Serie A club Sampdoria and was loaned back to Trapani until the end of the 2018–19 season.

On 1 August 2019, he signed with Juventus. He was assigned to their second squad. On 5 October 2020, he joined Juve Stabia on loan. On 21 August 2021, Mulè moved to Cesena on loan.

On 3 January 2023, Mulè joined Monopoli on loan.

On 11 July 2023, Mulè signed a three-year contract with Avellino. On 22 August 2024, he was loaned by Pescara, with an option to buy.
