= Pasquale Fazio =

Italian footballer

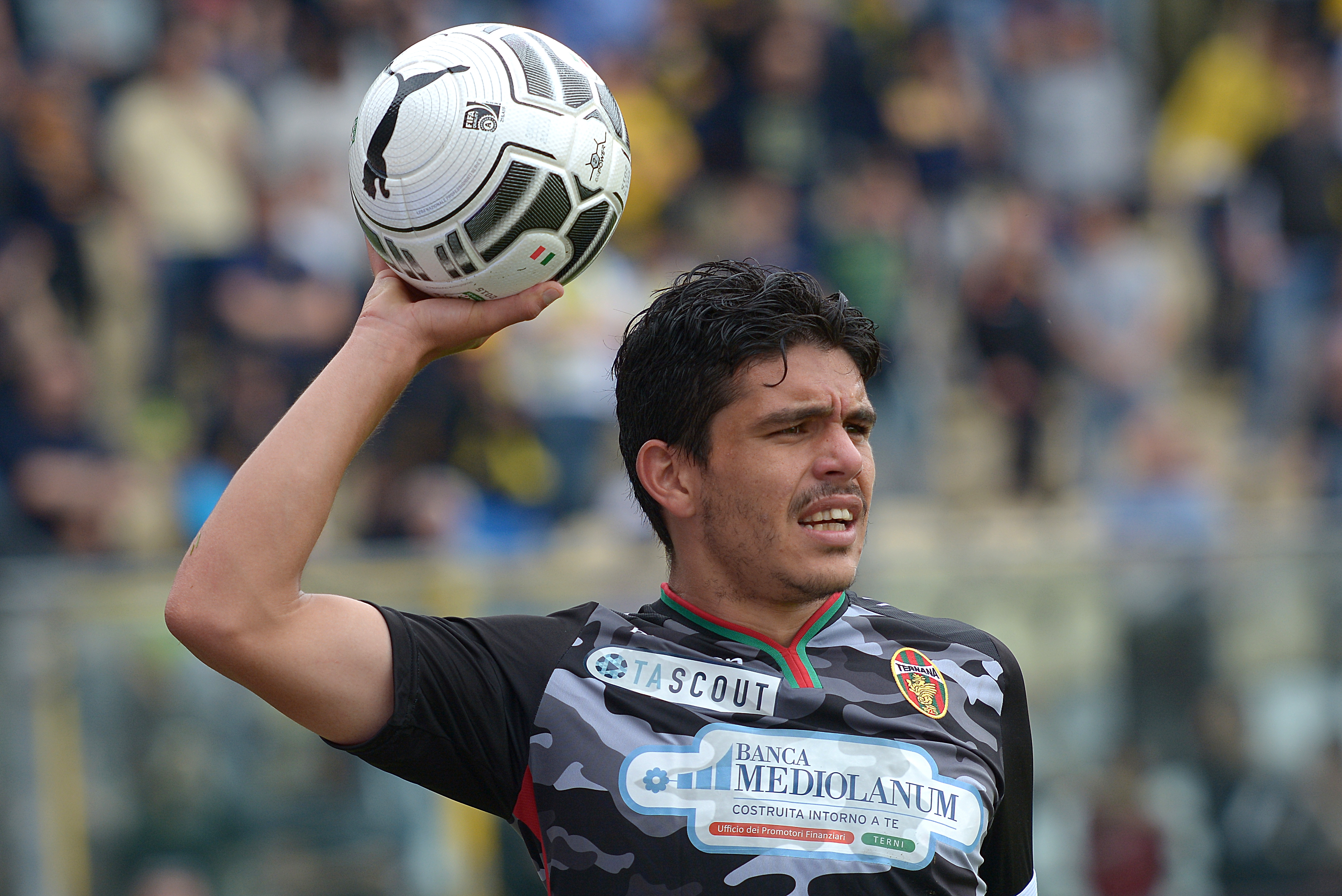
- Fazio in 2015

Personal information
- Full name: Pasquale Daniele Fazio
- Date of birth: 10 June 1989 (age 37)
- Place of birth: Messina, Italy
- Height: 1.80 m (5 ft 11 in)
- Position: Right back

Senior career*
| Years | Team | Apps | (Gls) |
| 2006–2009 | Igea Virtus | 21 | (0) |
| 2010–2011 | Fidelis Andria | 30 | (0) |
| 2011–2015 | Ternana | 120 | (3) |
| 2015–2018 | Trapani | 107 | (5) |
| 2018–2019 | Ternana | 31 | (0) |
| 2019–2020 | Juve Stabia | 21 | (0) |
| 2020–2023 | Catanzaro | 82 | (4) |
| 2023–2025 | Monopoli | 20 | (0) |

Managerial career
- 2026: Ternana
- * Club domestic league appearances and goals

Pasquale Daniele Fazio (born 10 June 1989) is an Italian football coach and a former right back.

== Playing career ==
On 10 July 2019, he signed with Juve Stabia.

On 16 September 2020, he joined Catanzaro on a 2-year contract.

On 14 August 2023, Fazio moved to Monopoli.

== Coaching career ==
After retirement, Fazio remained in Monopoli as a technical collaborator for the first team, then joined Ternana as an Under-17 coach.

On 16 March 2026, Fazio was promoted as interim head coach of the first team, following the dismissal of Fabio Liverani.

== Honours ==
Ternana

- Lega Pro Prima Divisione: 2011–12 (Group A)
