= Andrea Risolo =

Italian footballer (born 1996)

Personal information
- Date of birth: 13 August 1996 (age 30)
- Place of birth: Mesagne, Italy
- Position: Midfielder

Team information
- Current team: Virtus Francavilla
- Number: 21

Youth career
- Lecce

Senior career*
Years	Team	Apps	(Gls)
2014–2016	Lecce	0	(0)
2014–2015	→ Akragas (loan)	14	(0)
2015–2016	→ Virtus Francavilla (loan)	24	(2)
2016–2019	Bisceglie	98	(8)
2019–2022	Catanzaro	44	(2)
2020	→ Virtus Francavilla (loan)	11	(1)
2022	Fidelis Andria	16	(0)
2022–	Virtus Francavilla	66	(1)
- * Club domestic league appearances and goals as of 5 May 2024

Andrea Risolo (born 13 August 1996) is an Italian professional footballer who plays as a midfielder for Serie D club Virtus Francavilla.

== Career ==
Born in Mesagne, Risolo started his career in Lecce youth sector. On Lecce, he was loaned to Akragas and Virtus Francavilla, both in Serie D.

For the 2016–17 season, he moved to Serie D club Bisceglie, winning the promotion on his first year. He left the club in August 2018, after played two Serie C seasons.

On 13 July 2019, he signed with Serie C club Catanzaro. On 9 January 2020, he returned to Virtus Francavilla on loan.

On 15 January 2022, he joined to Fidelis Andria.

On 19 July 2022, Risolo returned to Virtus Francavilla once again.
