= Federico Vázquez =

Argentine association football player

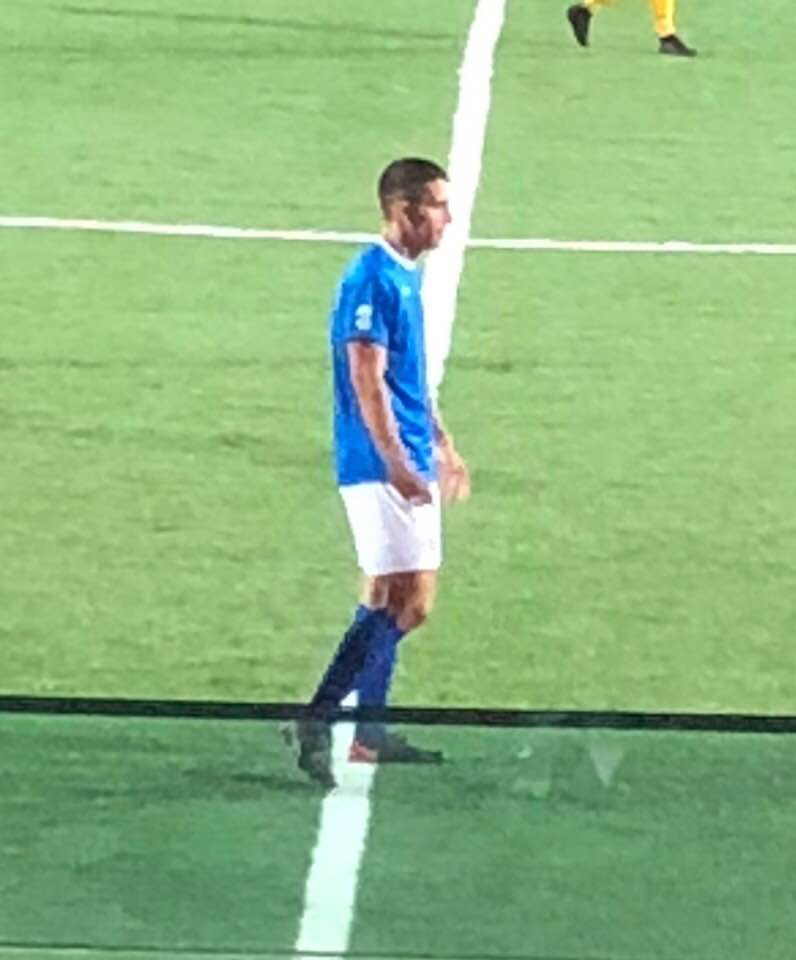

Personal information
- Full name: Federico Nahuel Vázquez
- Date of birth: 31 March 1993 (age 33)
- Place of birth: San Martín, Argentina
- Height: 1.81 m (5 ft 11 in)
- Position: Forward

Team information
- Current team: Trapani
- Number: 9

Youth career
- –2013: Vélez Sarsfield

Senior career*
Years	Team	Apps	(Gls)
2013–2017	Vélez Sarsfield	12	(0)
2016	→ Instituto (loan)	15	(1)
2017	Estudiantes de Mérida	10	(1)
2017–2018	Troina	29	(20)
2018–2019	Siracusa	28	(8)
2019–2021	Virtus Francavilla	51	(16)
2021–2022	Catanzaro	34	(9)
2022–2023	Gubbio	35	(6)
2023–2024	Perugia	21	(5)
2024–2025	Monopoli	14	(4)
2025–	Trapani	16	(2)
- * Club domestic league appearances and goals as of 1 May 2026

Federico Nahuel Vázquez (born 31 March 1993) is an Argentine professional footballer who plays as a forward for Serie D Group I club Trapani.

== Career ==
Vázquez started his career at Vélez Sarsfield and made his debut on 8 March 2013, coming on as a substitute to play the final 31 minutes in a 1–0 loss to Belgrano in the Argentine Primera División. In 2016, he had a loan spell at Instituto before joining Venezuelan Primera División side Estudiantes de Mérida. In August 2018, Vázquez joined Serie C side Siracusa having scored 20 goals in 29 games for Serie D side Troina the season before.

On 22 July 2019, he signed with Virtus Francavilla.

On 26 July 2021, he joined Catanzaro on a two-year deal.

On 17 August 2022, Vázquez moved to Gubbio on a two-year contract.

On 8 September 2023, Vázquez signed a two-season contract with Perugia.

On 28 July 2024, Vázquez joined Monopoli on a two-year contract.
