= Fabio Tito =

Italian footballer

Personal information
- Date of birth: 10 July 1993 (age 33)
- Place of birth: Castellammare di Stabia, Italy
- Height: 1.71 m (5 ft 7 in)
- Position: Defender

Senior career*
Years	Team	Apps	(Gls)
–2011	Scafatese		
2011–2014	Ischia	92	(5)
2014–2015	Casertana	20	(2)
2015–2016	Benevento	0	(0)
2015–2016	→ Casertana (loan)	24	(0)
2016–2017	Foggia	0	(0)
2016	→ Fidelis Andria (loan)	29	(2)
2017	Modena	1	(0)
2017–2020	Vibonese	92	(6)
2020–2024	Avellino	123	(7)
2024–2025	Ternana	35	(0)
2025–2026	Arezzo	9	(0)
- * Club domestic league appearances and goals as of 30 August 2026

Fabio Tito (born 10 July 1993) is an Italian professional footballer who plays as a defender.

== Career ==
On 19 August 2024, he joined Ternana.
