= Alberto Tentardini =

Italian footballer (born 1996)

Personal information
- Date of birth: 21 October 1996 (age 30)
- Place of birth: Como, Italy
- Height: 1.76 m (5 ft 9 in)
- Position: Left-back

Team information
- Current team: Paradiso
- Number: 96

Youth career
- 2013–2014: Como
- 2014–2015: Hellas Verona

Senior career*
Years	Team	Apps	(Gls)
2015–2016	Como	1	(0)
2016–2017	Padova	10	(0)
2017–2019	Monza	45	(2)
2019–2021	Teramo	60	(0)
2021–2023	Catanzaro	38	(1)
2023–2025	Cerignola	45	(1)
2025–2026	Gubbio	31	(0)
2026–	Paradiso	5	(0)
- * Club domestic league appearances and goals as of 1 October 2026

Alberto Tentardini (born 21 October 1996) is an Italian professional footballer who plays as a left-back for Swiss Promotion League club Paradiso.

== Career ==
On 5 July 2017, he joined Monza.

On 23 July 2019, he signed a 2-year contract with Teramo.

On 6 July 2021, he moved to Catanzaro on a 2-year contract.
