= Riccardo Gatti =

Italian footballer

Personal information
- Date of birth: 30 March 1997 (age 29)
- Place of birth: Lecco, Italy
- Height: 1.87 m (6 ft 2 in)
- Position: Defender

Team information
- Current team: Carpi
- Number: 44

Youth career
- –2017: Atalanta

Senior career*
Years	Team	Apps	(Gls)
2017–2020	Atalanta	0	(0)
2017–2018	→ Reggina (loan)	19	(0)
2018–2019	→ Monopoli (loan)	18	(1)
2019–2020	→ Fano (loan)	26	(1)
2020–2021	Reggiana	3	(0)
2021	→ Catanzaro (loan)	10	(0)
2021–2023	Catanzaro	21	(2)
2023–2024	AlbinoLeffe	28	(0)
2024–2025	Casertana	27	(2)
2025–2026	Cittadella	21	(0)
2026–	Carpi	0	(0)
- * Club domestic league appearances and goals as of 21 August 2026

Riccardo Gatti (born 30 March 1997) is an Italian footballer who plays as a defender for Serie C Group A club Carpi.

== Career ==
He made his Serie C debut for Reggina on 2 September 2017 in a game against Catanzaro.

On 13 July 2018, he joined Monopoli on loan for the 2018–19 season.

On 7 August 2019, he joined Fano on loan for the 2019–20 season.

On 25 September 2020, he joined Reggiana on a permanent deal.

On 21 October 2020, he made his Serie B debut against Ascoli.

On 30 January 2021 he was loaned to Serie C club Catanzaro. On 15 July 2021, he moved to Catanzaro on a permanent basis.

On 18 August 2023, Gatti signed a two-year deal with AlbinoLeffe.

On 12 July 2024, Gatti moved to Casertana on a two-year contract.
