= Francesco Bombagi =

Italian football player (born 1989)

Personal information
- Date of birth: 7 September 1989 (age 37)
- Place of birth: Sassari, Italy
- Height: 1.78 m (5 ft 10 in)
- Position: Midfielder

Team information
- Current team: Alghero
- Number: 25

Youth career
- –2008: Pisa

Senior career*
Years	Team	Apps	(Gls)
2008	Pisa	1	(0)
2009	Mezzocorona	12	(1)
2009–2011	Villacidrese	59	(10)
2011–2014	Reggina	16	(0)
2012	→ Piacenza (loan)	13	(4)
2013–2014	→ Grosseto (loan)	29	(6)
2014–2016	Juve Stabia	44	(8)
2016	Catania	10	(1)
2016–2017	Racing Fondi	21	(3)
2017–2018	Ternana	1	(0)
2018–2019	Pordenone	51	(2)
2019–2021	Teramo	59	(17)
2021–2024	Catanzaro	47	(7)
2024	Mantova	16	(1)
2024–2026	Legnago	15	(0)
2026–	Alghero	15	(0)
- * Club domestic league appearances and goals as of 12 August 2026 ‡ National team caps and goals as of 12 August 2026

Francesco Bombagi (born 7 September 1989) is an Italian professional footballer who plays as a midfielder for club Alghero.

== Career ==
He made his Serie B debut for Pisa on 14 November 2008 in a game against Mantova.

On 23 August 2019, he signed a two-year contract with Teramo.

On 7 July 2021, he signed a two-year contract with Catanzaro. He contributed to their promotion to Serie B at the end of the 2022–23 season.

On 2 January 2024 he joined Serie C side Mantova on permanent basis. For the second season in a row, he achieved promotion to Serie B.

On 30 August 2024, Bombagi moved to Legnago in Serie C.

== Honours ==
Pordenone

- Serie C: 2018–19 (Group B)
- Supercoppa di Serie C: 2019
