= Pietro Iemmello =

Italian footballer

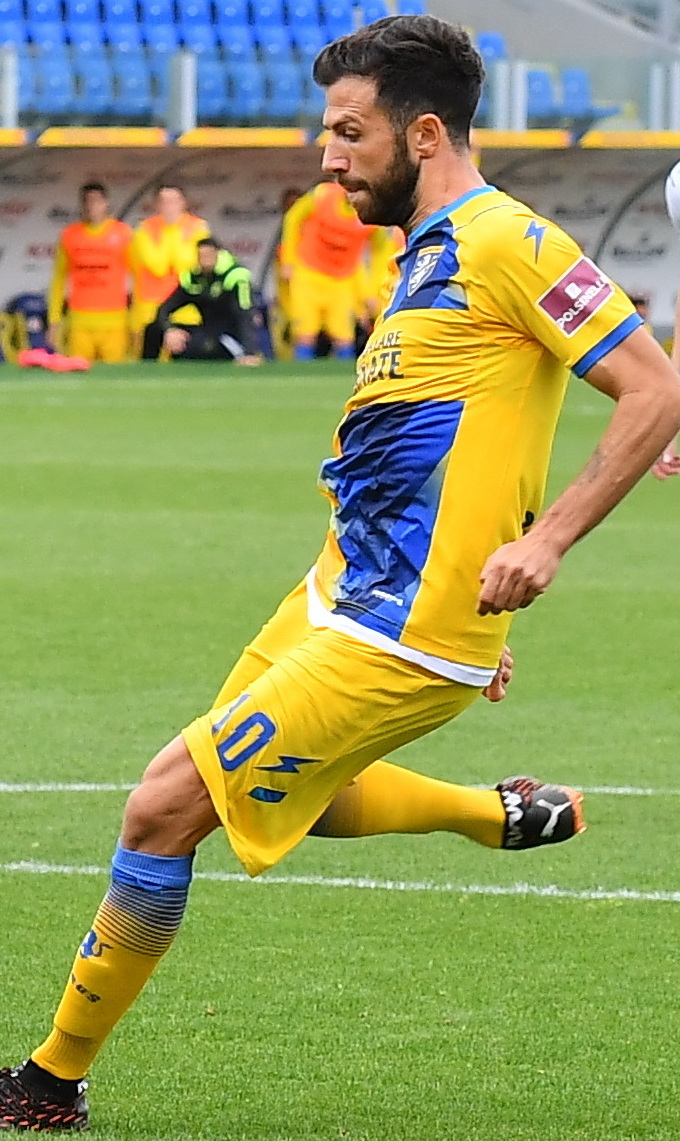

Personal information
- Date of birth: 6 March 1992 (age 34)
- Place of birth: Catanzaro, Italy
- Height: 1.80 m (5 ft 11 in)
- Position: Forward

Team information
- Current team: Catanzaro
- Number: 9

Youth career
- FC Catanzaro Lido
- 2006–2011: Fiorentina

Senior career*
Years	Team	Apps	(Gls)
2011–2013	Pro Vercelli	60	(13)
2013–2016	Spezia	1	(0)
2013–2014	→ Novara (loan)	4	(1)
2014	→ Pro Vercelli (loan)	14	(1)
2014–2016	→ Foggia (loan)	72	(45)
2016–2018	Sassuolo	17	(5)
2017–2018	→ Benevento (loan)	16	(2)
2018–2021	Benevento	0	(0)
2018–2019	→ Foggia (loan)	26	(7)
2019–2020	→ Perugia (loan)	35	(19)
2020–2021	→ Las Palmas (loan)	10	(0)
2021–2022	Frosinone	18	(3)
2022	→ Catanzaro (loan)	12	(6)
2022–	Catanzaro	139	(69)

International career
2007–2008	Italy U16	3 (Note: Iemmello received a call-up to a friendly tournament in March 2008, however the archive of Italian Football Federation did not have the record of the matches (Ireland, Turkey, Malta), thus his cap for the under-16 team was at least, 2 as indicated by the archive, plus starting appearance against Turkey, as indicated by Turkish Football Federation.)	(0)
2009	Italy U17	5	(2)
2009–2010	Italy U18	7	(2)
2010–2011	Italy U19	10	(5)
- * Club domestic league appearances and goals as of 10 May 2026

Pietro Iemmello (born 6 March 1992) is an Italian professional footballer who plays as a forward for Serie B club Catanzaro.

== Club career ==
Born in Catanzaro, Calabria, Iemmello was signed by Fiorentina at a young age. He finished as the runner-up of the 2011 Torneo di Viareggio with the club, winning 2011 Coppa Italia Primavera. He also finished as the losing semi-finalists of the playoffs round of the youth league. He played in the finals and semi-finals as one of the starting forward in the 4–3–3 formation, except missed the second leg of the cup.

In July 2011 he was invited to pre-season camp of the first team, along with 11 other youth players. On 13 August he was loaned to Italian third division club Pro Vercelli along with Primavera (literally "Spring", the under-20 team) team-mate Marcos Miranda. On 29 June was renovate a loan for another season to Pro Vercelli. In Summer 2013 Pro Vercelli buy all player from Fiorentina.

Late in the 2013 summer transfer window, Pro Vercelli sold Iemmello to Spezia, who promptly loaned him to Novara.

In 2014 he moved to Foggia and scored 16 goals in 35 matches in the 2014–15 Lega Pro Gruppo C season. On 19 March 2016, Iemmello scored four goals in a single match for Foggia, including a 90th-minute winner in his team's 4–2 win over Ischia Isolaverde. He was one of the main men in the 2015–16 Lega Pro Gruppo C season, scoring an impressive 24 goals in 32 matches and being the league top scorer.

In August 2016 he was signed by Serie B side Spezia. He played just one Serie B match against Salernitana before moving to Serie A side Sassuolo. He scored 5 goals in 17 appearances in the 2016–17 Serie A season.

On 31 August 2017, Iemmello joined Benevento on a season-long loan deal with obligation to buy. He scored 2 goals in 14 appearances for the giallorossi, including a goal at San Siro against A.C. Milan which secured Benevento's first ever away win in Serie A, but the team could not avoid relegation.

In August 2018, Iemmello was loaned to Serie B side Foggia, making his return to the rossoneri side after two years. On 16 July 2019, he joined Serie B club Perugia on loan. Perugia held an obligation to purchase his rights in case of promotion to Serie A for the 2020–21 season. Perugia was relegated to Serie C, however.

On 4 October 2020, Iemmello moved abroad for the first time in his career after agreeing to a one-year loan deal at Spanish Segunda División side UD Las Palmas. Iemmello scored his first goal in Spanish football in the first round of the 2020–21 Copa del Rey against fourth-tier CD Varea on 17 December 2020.

On 31 January 2021 he signed with Frosinone on a permanent basis. On 20 January 2022, he moved to Catanzaro on loan. On 8 July 2022, Iemmello returned to Catanzaro on a permanent basis.

== International career ==
Iemmello was a member of the Italy under-17 team at 2009 FIFA U-17 World Cup and took part in the 2011 UEFA European Under-19 Football Championship qualification campaign with U-19 team. He started his youth international career in a training camp for players born between 1992 and 1993. He was not a regular of the U-17 team and did not play in the whole 2009 UEFA European Under-17 Football Championship. During the 2009–10 season he received call-up from the Italy U-18 team to prepare for the "World Junior Cup" and as a bridging team for U-19. He scored once in two friendlies against Czech Republic.

Iemmello travelled with the Azzurrini to Nigeria in October 2009, wearing no.18 shirt. Iemmello played all 5 matches in the U-17 World Cup for the de facto U-18 team as a starting forward, except the first one. He scored 2 goals, finishing as Italy's joint-topscorer along with Federico Carraro. He made his debut in the 74th minute of the first match, substituting Giacomo Beretta, who also started 4 matches, and partnered with Iemmello for 3 matches. After losing to Switzerland in the fifth match, the Azzurrini finished the tournament as the losing finalists. Iemmello also played for the Azzurrini U-18 team in the 2010 Slovakia youth cup, winning the tournament for the defending 2009 champions.

In the 2011 U-19 Euro qualifying campaign, he only played twice (out of 3 games) and only featured in the first game as a starting forward. In the elite round, he played all 3 matches but all as sub. Alberto Libertazzi and Giacomo Beretta were the starting forwards in the qualifying and elite rounds respectively. Iemmello did not score any goals in competitive games for the Italy U-19 team, however he scored two braces in the team's friendlies, with an average of 1 goal per friendly game.

== Career statistics ==
=== Club ===
Appearances and goals by club, season and competition
Club	Season	League			National cup (Note: Includes Coppa Italia.)		League cup (Note: Includes Coppa Italia Serie C.)		Continental		Other (Note: Includes Serie B and Serie C Promotion Play-offs, Supercoppa di Serie C.)		Total	
Club	Season	Division	Apps	Goals	Apps	Goals	Apps	Goals	Apps	Goals	Apps	Goals	Apps	Goals
Catanzaro (loan)	2021–22	Serie C	12	6	0	0	0	0	—		4 (Note: Appearance(s) in Serie C Promotion play-offs)	2	16	8
Catanzaro	2022–23	Serie C	36	28	1	0	0	0	—		2 (Note: Appearance(s) in Supercoppa di Serie C)	2	39	30
Catanzaro	2023–24	Serie B	35	15	0	0	0	0	—		3 (Note: Appearance(s) in Serie B Promotion play-offs)	2	38	17
Catanzaro	2023–24	Serie B	24	13	1	0	0	0	—		0	0	25	13
Catanzaro	Catanzaro total		107	62	2	0	0	0	—		9	6	117	68

== Honours ==
Fiorentina youth

- Coppa Italia Primavera: 2011

Catanzaro

- Serie C: 2022–23 (Group C)
- Supercoppa di Serie C: 2023

Individual

- Capocannoniere (Serie C): 2022–23
