= Pietro Cianci =

Italian professional football striker

Personal information
- Date of birth: 2 February 1996 (age 30)
- Place of birth: Bari, Italy
- Height: 1.95 m (6 ft 5 in)
- Position: Striker

Team information
- Current team: Arezzo
- Number: 71

Youth career
- 2013–2014: Torino
- 2014–2015: Varese
- 2015: → Pro Vercelli (loan)

Senior career*
Years	Team	Apps	(Gls)
2015–2016	Fidelis Andria	28	(4)
2016–2019	Sassuolo	0	(0)
2016–2017	→ Fidelis Andria (loan)	31	(5)
2017–2018	→ Reggiana (loan)	31	(4)
2018–2019	→ Robur Siena (loan)	34	(7)
2019–2021	Teramo	14	(2)
2020	→ Carpi (loan)	8	(3)
2020–2021	→ Potenza (loan)	18	(10)
2021	→ Bari (loan)	15	(3)
2021–2023	Catanzaro	72	(11)
2023–2024	Taranto	18	(4)
2024–2025	Catania	18	(7)
2024–2025	→ Ternana (loan)	40	(13)
2025	Ternana	0	(0)
2025–	Arezzo	34	(12)
- * Club domestic league appearances and goals as of 30 April 2026

Pietro Cianci (born 2 February 1996) is an Italian professional footballer who plays as a striker for Serie B club Arezzo.

== Career ==
=== Early career ===
Cianci was born in the Apulia city of Bari, but began his career in the youth teams of Livorno. He moved on to Varese after one year, and played there for a single season before signing for Lega Pro side Fidelis Andria in 2015, on a three-year contract. The tall striker impressed for the Leoni Azzurri, and subsequently made a transfer to Serie A side Sassuolo, signing a 5-year contract. On 9 July 2019, Cianci signed to Teramo.

=== Loan moves ===
Cianci's Sassuolo contract included a one-year loan deal which meant he stayed in Andria for a further year. His first appearance of the 2016–17 season came in a 1–1 draw (AET, lost 3–5 on penalties) with Bassano Virtus in the Coppa Italia. Cianci played the full 120 minutes, but missed the vital penalty in the shoot-out which condemned Andria to defeat. His first goal for Andria since returning on loan came in a 1–1 draw with Akragas in the Lega Pro, scoring the equalising goal in the third minute of stoppage time to rescue a point.

=== Teramo ===
On 5 July 2019, he signed a 3-year contract with Teramo.

==== Loan to Carpi ====
On 17 January 2020 he was loaned by Carpi.

==== Loan to Potenza ====
He was loaned out to Potenza on 25 September 2020. With Potenza, he scored a total 10 goals in 18 appearances, showing off as one of the most effective strikers of the Group C of the 2020–21 Serie C.

==== Loan to Bari ====
On 28 January 2021, Cianci was recalled from his Potenza loan and immediately transferred (on loan again) to his hometown's club Bari, second-placed in the Serie C league by the time of the move.

=== Catanzaro ===
On 13 August 2021, he signed a 2-year contract with Catanzaro with another 1-year option.

=== Taranto ===
From July 2023, Cianci becomes the new striker of Taranto FC, with whom he signs a contract that binds him to the club for two years.

=== Ternana ===
On 28 August 2024, Cianci moved to Ternana on loan with an option to buy and a conditional obligation to buy.

== Personal life ==
Cianci is the cousin of Bari midfielder Nicola Bellomo.

== Career statistics ==
=== Club ===
As of 26 May 2021

Appearances and goals by club, season and competition
Club	Season	League			National cup		Other		Total	
Club	Season	Division	Apps	Goals	Apps	Goals	Apps	Goals	Apps	Goals
Fidelis Andria	2015–16	Lega Pro	28	4	2 (Note: All appearance(s) in Coppa Italia Lega Pro.)	0	—		30	4
Fidelis Andria	2016–17 (loan)	Lega Pro	31	5	1+1	0	—		33	5
Fidelis Andria	Total		59	9	4	0	0	0	63	9
Reggiana (loan)	2017–18	Serie C	27	4	2+1 (Note: All appearance(s) in Coppa Italia Serie C.)	0+1	5 (Note: All appearance(s) in promotion play-offs.)	0	35	5
Siena (loan)	2018–19	Serie C	31	7	2+1	0	1	0	35	7
Teramo	2019–20	Serie C	14	2	3	0	—		17	2
Carpi (loan)	2019–20	Serie C	6	3	0	0	2	0	8	3
Potenza (loan)	2020–21	Serie C	18	10	—		—		18	10
Bari (loan)	2020–21	Serie C	13	3	—		2	0	15	3
Career total			168	38	13	1	10	0	191	39
