= Luca Martinelli =

Italian footballer

Personal information
- Date of birth: 20 December 1988 (age 37)
- Place of birth: Milan, Italy
- Height: 1.85 m (6 ft 1 in)
- Position: Central defender

Team information
- Current team: Cerignola
- Number: 5

Youth career
- –2008: Lecco

Senior career*
Years	Team	Apps	(Gls)
2008–2011	Lecco	35	(1)
2009	→ Mezzocorona (loan)	12	(0)
2011–2013	Cittadella	39	(1)
2013–2014	Juve Stabia	27	(1)
2014–2015	Empoli	1	(0)
2014–2015	→ Novara (loan)	26	(0)
2015–2016	ACR Messina	26	(1)
2016–2019	Foggia	78	(3)
2019–2023	Catanzaro	118	(7)
2023–	Cerignola	71	(2)
- * Club domestic league appearances and goals as of 1 May 2026

Luca Martinelli is an Italian professional footballer who plays as a central defender for Serie C Group C club Cerignola.

== Career ==
In January 2013 Martinelli was signed by Juve Stabia outright. In summer 2013 half of the registration rights of Martinelli was exchanged with Yves Baraye of Chievo. Half of the registration rights of Baraye was valued for €500,000.

Martinelli returned to Juve Stabia in a temporary deal for 2013–14 season. In January 2014 Juve Stabia bought back Martinelli for an undisclosed fee, as well as Vincenzo Carrotta was sold to Juve Stabia for €400,000. Baraye also returned to Chievo in January for an undisclosed fee.

=== Empoli ===
In January 2014 Martinelli was signed by Empoli F.C. Juve Stabia signed Samuele Romeo in exchange. Both Martinelli and Romeo were valued for €1.5 million. On 1 September 2014 he was loaned to Novara, with Romano Perticone moved to Empoli. Martinelli also changed his Empoli shirt number from 3 to 58 in 2014, and again to 55 in 2015.

=== Messina ===
In summer 2015 he was sold to ACR Messina. He signed a 3-year contract in November 2015.

=== Foggia ===
On 10 July 2016 Martinelli was signed by Foggia in a 2-year contract.

=== Catanzaro ===
On 16 July 2019, he signed a 3-year contract with Catanzaro.
