= Dimitris Sounas =

Greek footballer

Personal information
- Full name: Dimitrios Sounas
- Date of birth: 12 August 1994 (age 32)
- Place of birth: Portaria, Chalkidiki, Greece
- Height: 1.77 m (5 ft 9 1/2 in)
- Position: Midfielder

Team information
- Current team: Avellino
- Number: 24

Youth career
- 2010–2011: Aris

Senior career*
Years	Team	Apps	(Gls)
2012–2015	Aris	36	(1)
2016	Apollon Smyrnis	13	(0)
2016–2019	Monopoli	84	(4)
2019–2020	Reggina	23	(2)
2020–2022	Perugia	38	(0)
2022–2024	Catanzaro	80	(14)
2024–	Avellino	66	(9)

International career
2012–2013	Greece U19	8	(1)
2015	Greece U21	3	(0)
- * Club domestic league appearances and goals as of 10 May 2026

Dimitris Sounas (Greek: Δημήτρης Σουνάς; born on 12 August 1994) is a Greek professional footballer who plays as a midfielder for Serie B club Avellino.

== Club career ==
=== Aris ===
Sounas started his career in the youth teams of Aris. In 2012, new head coach Makis Katsavakis promoted him to the first team, and he made his debut on 14 August 2012, in a friendly game against Veria, scoring a goal. Sounas made his professional debut on 27 August 2012, against Panionios. He scored his first goal for the club against Atromitos at the Kleanthis Vikelidis, in a 1–1 draw. On 23 September 2015, he left the club as a free agent.

=== Apollon Smyrnis ===
Sounas signed for Apollon Smyrnis in the Football League until the end of the 2016–17 season.

=== Monopoli ===
On 17 July 2016, Sounas signed a contract with Lega Pro club Monopoli. He left the club having made 93 appearances (scoring 4 goals and providing 17 assists) in all competitions.

=== Reggina ===
On 2 July 2019, Sounas signed a contract with Lega Pro club Reggina until the summer of 2021. The transfer fee was not disclosed.

=== Perugia ===
On 28 September 2020, he joined Serie C club Perugia. He lost his position in the squad after Perugia was promoted to Serie B for the 2021–22 season.

=== Catanzaro ===
On 13 January 2022, he signed a two-and-a-half-year contract with Catanzaro, returning to Serie C.

== International career ==
In August 2012, Sounas received a call-up from Greece under-19's head coach Kostas Tsanas.

== Career statistics ==
As of match played 24 April 2022

Appearances and goals by club, season and competition
Club	Season	League			National cup		Other		Total	
Club	Season	Division	Apps	Goals	Apps	Goals	Apps	Goals	Apps	Goals
Aris	2012–13	Super League Greece	18	1	2	1	—		20	2
Aris	2013–14	Super League Greece	18	0	2	0	—		20	0
Aris	Total		36	1	4	1	0	0	40	2
Apollon Smyrnis	2015–16	Football League Greece	13	0	0	0	—		13	0
Monopoli	2016–17	Lega Pro	26	0	0	0	—		26	0
Monopoli	2017–18	Serie C	34	3	0	0	1 (Note: Appearance(s) in Promotion Playoffs)	0	35	3
Monopoli	2018–19	Serie C	24	1	2	0	1	0	27	1
Monopoli	Total		84	4	2	0	2	0	88	4
Reggina	2019–20	Serie C	23	2	—		—		23	2
Perugia	2020–21	Serie C	36	0	2	1	—		38	1
Perugia	2021–22	Serie B	2	0	0	0	—		2	0
Perugia	Total		38	0	2	1	0	0	40	1
Catanzaro	2021–22	Serie C	16	3	—		—		16	3
Total			210	10	8	2	2	0	220	12
