= Andrea Sala (footballer) =

Italian footballer (born 1993)

Personal information
- Date of birth: 16 September 1993 (age 33)
- Place of birth: Saronno, Italy
- Height: 1.86 m (6 ft 1 in)
- Position: Goalkeeper

Team information
- Current team: Vado
- Number: 16

Youth career
- –2011: Pro Patria

Senior career*
Years	Team	Apps	(Gls)
2011–2013	Pro Patria	27	(0)
2011–2012	→ Inter (loan)	0	(0)
2013–2016	Ternana	16	(0)
2016–2017	Reggina	37	(0)
2017–2018	Ternana	14	(0)
2018–2019	Sambenedettese	25	(0)
2019–2020	Rimini	8	(0)
2020–2021	Arezzo	28	(0)
2021–2022	Catania	23	(0)
2022–2024	Catanzaro	4	(0)
2024–2026	Crotone	6	(0)
2025	→ Padova (loan)	0	(0)
2026	Pro Patria	13	(0)
2026–	Vado	2	(0)
- * Club domestic league appearances and goals as of 28 August 2026

Andrea Sala (born 16 September 1993) is an Italian footballer who plays as a goalkeeper who plays for Serie C Group B club Vado.

== Career ==
=== Pro Patria ===
Born in Saronno, the Province of Varese, Lombardy, Sala started his professional career at Pro Patria, located in Busto Arsizio, also in the Province of Varese. Sala had played for Pro Patria since ca.2005, for the Giovanissimi team. Sala made his professional debut during 2010–11 Lega Pro Seconda Divisione. That season Luca Anania was the starting keeper and Matteo Andreoletti was the second keeper, while Sala was a player of Berretti reserve team. However Sala also played in the round 12, replacing Matteo Serafini after Anania was sent off. Sala also played in the next round.

=== Inter ===
In July 2011 Inter Milan borrowed Sala from Pro Patria for its Primavera under-20 team. The team was short of keepers, as in June 2011 Francesco Bardi was graduated from Inter "spring" while Alberto Gallinetta was transferred to Parma. Initially Sala would compete with Raffaele Di Gennaro for the first choice, who missed most of the 2010–11 season due to injury. However Sala was also injured. Coach Andrea Stramaccioni used overage player Paolo Tornaghi (7 games) as well as borrowed Riccardo Melgrati (3 games + 2 in Europe) and Matteo Cincilla (3 games, 1 as sub + 1 in Europe) from Inter's Berretti under-18 team. Di Gennaro also played twice in the group stage of NextGen series and once in the cup after he recovered. On 14 January 2012, the first league match after the winter break (week 14), Sala became the first choice while Di Gennaro was on the bench, winning against Cittadella 4–1. However it was reversed in the next match, the rescheduled week 4 fixture. He was also able to play once more against Brescia (week 16), the match between the NextGen series and Torneo di Viareggio, where Di Gennaro was the first choice in those tournaments. Sala played again in round 20 (10 March), the match after the rescheduled round 18 on 7 March, as well as round 21 (on 17 March), the match before the NextGen semi-finals (and possibly final; Inter did win the tournament). After Di Gennaro joined the first team as fourth keeper, Sala collected his fifth appearances and the first under Daniele Bernazzani, a 0–1 loss to Chievo on 31 March (week 23), the fifth loss of Inter in the reserve league. However Sala was rested again in week 24 (4 April). That mid-week fixture Di Gennaro played his sixth match and once again out-numbered Sala. However Sala once again played on 7 April against bottom club Vicenza (rescheduled week 22) as Di Gennaro once again joined the first team. Sala was the backup again in round 25 and 26 (last round). In total, Sala played 6 times, Di Gennaro 8 times, Tornaghi 7 times and both 3 games for Melgrati and Cincilla (1 as sub).

In the playoffs, Sala was the backup of Di Gennaro. However, in the second match (semi-finals), Di Gennaro was injured during the match. Sala replaced him in 69th minute and played the whole extra time. He conceded 2 goals (in second half and extra time respectively) but Inter striker Samuele Longo also scored twice in extra time and beat Milan 4–3. In the final Sala conceded 2 goals but the strikers also scored 3 goals to win the league.

=== Pro Patria return ===
Sala returned to Pro Patria and went to pre-season camp in July 2012.

=== Ternana ===
In 2013, he was signed by Serie B club Ternana in a temporary deal. On 1 July 2014, Sala was signed by Serie C club Reggiana. On 25 July 2014 Sala returned to Serie B for Ternana in a temporary deal, for a reported €100,000 loan fee, with an obligation to sign. Sala signed a 1+2-year contract. He was the understudy of Alberto Brignoli (2013–15 season) and Luca Mazzoni (2015–16).

=== Rimini ===
On 20 August 2019 he joined Rimini on a one-year contract with an option for the second year.

=== Catania ===
On 18 July 2021, he signed with Catania.

On 9 April 2022, he was released together with all of his Catania teammates following the club's exclusion from Italian football due to its inability to overcome a number of financial issues.

=== Catanzaro ===
On 1 July 2022, Sala signed a two-year contract with Catanzaro.

=== Crotone ===
On 19 July 2024, Sala signed a three-year contract with Crotone.

=== Pro Patria ===
On 2 January 2026, he joined Pro Patria.

== Honours ==
- Campionato Nazionale Primavera: 2012 (Inter Primavera)
- NextGen series: 2012 (Inter Primavera, unused bench)
