= Simone Pontisso =

Italian footballer

Personal information
- Date of birth: 20 March 1997 (age 29)
- Place of birth: San Daniele del Friuli, Italy
- Height: 1.84 m (6 ft 0 in)
- Position: Defensive midfielder

Team information
- Current team: Cremonese
- Number: 20

Youth career
- –2015: Udinese

Senior career*
Years	Team	Apps	(Gls)
2015–2019	Udinese	2	(0)
2016–2017	→ SPAL (loan)	5	(1)
2019–2022	Vicenza Virtus	70	(3)
2022	Pescara	16	(0)
2022–2026	Catanzaro	122	(11)
2026–	Cremonese	0	(0)

International career^{‡}
2015–2016	Italy U19	7	(2)
2016	Italy U20	4	(0)
Medal record
Men's football
Representing Italy
UEFA European Under-19 Championship
Runner-up	2016 Germany
- * Club domestic league appearances and goals as of 22 August 2026 ‡ National team caps and goals as of 15 November 2016

Simone Pontisso (born 20 March 1997) is an Italian professional footballer who plays as a defensive midfielder for Serie B club Cremonese.

== Club career ==
Pontisso is a youth exponent from Udinese. He made his Serie A debut at 31 May 2015 against Cagliari Calcio. He replaced Stipe Perica at half-time in a 4–3 away defeat.

In July 2016, Pontisso was loaned out to SPAL to play in Serie B.

On 30 January 2019, he signed with Vicenza Virtus.

On 31 January 2022, Pontisso moved to Pescara.

On 5 July 2022, he signed a two-year contract with Catanzaro.

== Honours ==
Italy U19

- UEFA European Under-19 Championship runner-up: 2016
