= Stefano Scognamillo =

Italian-Russian footballer

Personal information
- Date of birth: 4 May 1994 (age 32)
- Place of birth: Saint Petersburg, Russia
- Height: 1.83 m (6 ft 0 in)
- Position: Defender

Team information
- Current team: Benevento
- Number: 14

Youth career
- Il Campanile
- –2013: Ascoli

Senior career*
| Years | Team | Apps | (Gls) |
| 2011–2015 | Ascoli | 24 | (0) |
| 2014–2015 | → Aversa Normanna (loan) | 23 | (0) |
| 2015–2018 | Matera | 38 | (1) |
| 2018–2019 | Parma | 0 | (0) |
| 2018–2019 | → Trapani (loan) | 18 | (2) |
| 2019–2020 | Trapani | 28 | (0) |
| 2020–2021 | Alessandria | 13 | (0) |
| 2021 | → Catanzaro (loan) | 15 | (0) |
| 2021–2025 | Catanzaro | 139 | (6) |
| 2025– | Benevento | 36 | (0) |
- * Club domestic league appearances and goals as of 1 May 2026

Stefano Scognamillo (Russian: Стефано Сконьямилло; born 4 May 1994) is a professional footballer who plays as a defender for Serie B club Benevento. He holds dual Russian and Italian citizenship.

== Career ==
=== Ascoli ===
He is a product of Ascoli's youth system and played for their Primavera (Under-19 squad) from 2010–11 to 2012–13. He made his Serie C debut for Ascoli's senior squad on 1 September 2013, in a game against Frosinone as a starter.

==== Loan to Aversa Normanna ====
On 28 August 2014, he joined Aversa Normanna in Serie C for a season-long loan.

=== Matera ===
He joined Matera in the summer of 2015 and extended his contract with the club on 20 June 2017.

=== Parma ===
He signed with Serie A club Parma in July 2018.

==== Loan to Trapani ====
On 11 August 2018, he was loaned to Serie C club Trapani for one season.

=== Trapani ===
On 29 July 2019, he moved to Trapani on a permanent basis, signing a two-year contract.

=== Alessandria ===
On 9 September 2020, he joined Alessandria on a two-year contract.

==== Loan to Catanzaro ====
On 15 January 2021, he moved to Catanzaro on loan.

=== Return to Catanzaro ===
On 3 August 2021, he returned to Catanzaro on a permanent basis.

=== Benevento ===
On 17 July 2025, Scognamillo signed a three-year contract with Benevento in Serie C.

== Personal life ==
Scognamillo was born in Saint Petersburg, Russia to a Russian mother and an Italian father.
