= Luca Verna =

Italian footballer

Personal information
- Date of birth: 21 June 1993 (age 33)
- Place of birth: Lanciano, Italy
- Height: 1.84 m (6 ft 1/2 in)
- Position: Midfielder

Youth career
- –2011: Virtus Lanciano
- 2010–2011: → Chievo (loan)

Senior career*
Years	Team	Apps	(Gls)
2011–2015	Virtus Lanciano	4	(0)
2012–2013	→ Chieti (loan)	29	(2)
2014	→ Chieti (loan)	10	(0)
2014–2015	→ Grosseto (loan)	32	(4)
2015–2020	Pisa	105	(8)
2017–2018	→ Carpi (loan)	40	(4)
2018–2019	→ Cosenza (loan)	7	(0)
2020	→ Ternana (loan)	9	(0)
2020–2024	Catanzaro	137	(9)
2024–2025	Catania	19	(1)
2025–2026	Trapani	8	(0)
2025–2026	→ Cittadella (loan)	12	(0)
2026–	Lanciano	0	(0)
- * Club domestic league appearances and goals as of 29 April 2026

Luca Verna (born 21 June 1993) is an Italian professional footballer who plays as a midfielder for Serie D club Lanciano.

== Career ==
Verna made his professional debut in Lega Pro for Virtus Lanciano on 22 January 2012, in a game against Prato.

On 9 January 2019, he returned to Pisa after his loan spell with Cosenza.

On 31 January 2020, he joined Ternana on loan with an option to buy.

On 17 September 2020 he signed a two-year contract with Catanzaro.
