= Jari Vandeputte =

Belgian footballer (born 1996)

Personal information
- Date of birth: 14 February 1996 (age 30)
- Place of birth: Ghent, Belgium
- Height: 1.74 m (5 ft 9 in)
- Position: Midfielder

Team information
- Current team: Cremonese
- Number: 27

Youth career
- –2013: Gent

Senior career*
Years	Team	Apps	(Gls)
2013–2017	Gent	6	(0)
2014–2015	→ Roeselare (loan)	21	(2)
2015–2017	→ FC Eindhoven (loan)	58	(6)
2017–2019	Viterbese	72	(9)
2019–2022	Vicenza	53	(3)
2021–2022	→ Catanzaro (loan)	34	(7)
2022–2025	Catanzaro	74	(21)
2024–2025	→ Cremonese (loan)	35	(4)
2025–	Cremonese	32	(1)

International career
2011	Belgium U15	1	(0)
2013	Belgium U17	6	(0)
2014	Belgium U18	1	(0)
2013–2015	Belgium U19	16	(1)
- * Club domestic league appearances and goals as of 25 May 2026

Jari Vandeputte (born 14 February 1996) is a Belgian professional footballer who plays as a midfielder for Serie B club Cremonese.

== Career ==
Vandeputte made his debut on 27 July 2013 in the first round of the 2013–14 season against Waasland-Beveren. He replaced Hannes van der Bruggen after 57 minutes. He delivered an assist for Carlos Diogo. The game ended 1–1.

On 2 September 2019 he signed a two-year contract with Vicenza after the first season he signed an extension with the club until 30 June 2023.

On 22 July 2021, he joined Catanzaro on loan. On 1 August 2022, Vandeputte returned to Catanzaro on a permanent basis and signed a three-year contract.

On 4 July 2024, Vandeputte joined Cremonese on loan with an obligation to buy.
