= Alessio Curcio =

English professional football player (born 1990)

Personal information
- Date of birth: 12 March 1990 (age 36)
- Place of birth: Benevento, Italy
- Height: 1.90 m (6 ft 3 in)
- Position: Striker

Team information
- Current team: Altamura
- Number: 10

Youth career
- 2001–2009: Juventus

Senior career*
Years	Team	Apps	(Gls)
2009–2011	Canavese	47	(8)
2011–2013	Casale	71	(14)
2013–2014	Castiglione	30	(6)
2014–2016	Renate	23	(1)
2016–2017	Nuorese	18	(9)
2017–2018	Arzachena	35	(13)
2018–2020	Vicenza	35	(2)
2020	Catania	12	(4)
2020–2022	Foggia	66	(25)
2022–2024	Catanzaro	38	(9)
2023–2024	→ Casertana (loan)	35	(15)
2024–2025	Ternana	35	(6)
2025–	Altamura	35	(7)
- * Club domestic league appearances and goals as of 1 May 2026

Alessio Curcio (born 12 March 1990) is an Italian professional footballer who plays as a striker for Serie C Group C club Altamura.

== Career ==
Curcio made 6 starts out of 15 appearances for Juventus Primavera reserve team in 2008–09 season, scoring 2 goals. Curcio also lent to Juventus' Berretti U18 team in June 2009 along with Antonio Piccolo, losing to A.C. Milan in the final. However Milan fielded much more member from Primavera team and born 1990 and 1989 compared to Juve Berretti.

Curcio was promoted from the Juventus youth setup in the summer of 2009 and trained with the first team prior to his loan move to Lega Pro club F.C. Canavese. In his two seasons with the club, the young midfielder made 48 appearances with 7 goals.

After Canavese withdrew from professional league, Curcio was signed by Casale.

On 9 January 2020 he signed a 1.5-year contract with Catania.

On 4 October 2020 he moved to Foggia.

On 13 August 2022, Curcio joined Catanzaro on a two-year contract.

On 8 September 2023, Curcio joined Casertana on a season-long loan.

On 30 August 2024, Curcio signed a two-year contract with Ternana.
