= Stadio Nicola Ceravolo =

Multi-purpose stadium in Catanzaro, Italy

- Stadio Militare
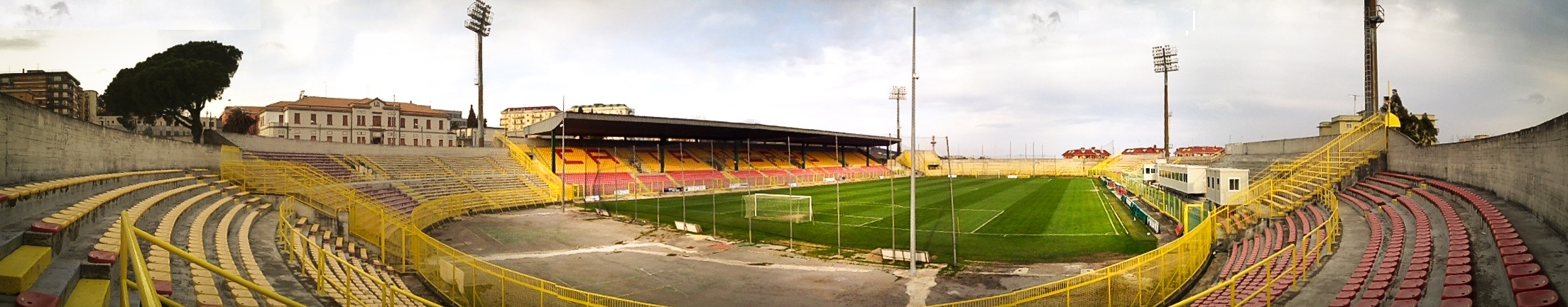
- Interactive map of Stadio Nicola Ceravolo
- Former names: Stadio Militare (1919–1927); Stadio Comunale (1927–1990)
- Location: Catanzaro, Italy
- Owner: Municipality of Catanzaro
- Capacity: 14,650
- Surface: Grass
- Field size: 105 m × 65 m (344 ft × 213 ft)

Construction
- Opened: 1919
- Renovated: 1924, 1971, 1998, 2008, 2011, 2017

Tenant
- US Catanzaro 1929

Stadio Nicola Ceravolo is a multi-purpose stadium in Catanzaro, Italy. The stadium was built in 1919, and it is one of the oldest in Italy.

It holds 14,650 people, which makes it the third-largest stadium by capacity in Calabria. It is currently the home of US Catanzaro 1929.

In 1989 the stadium was renamed in honour of Nicola Ceravolo, who had died the previous year and was an influential former president of US Catanzaro for twenty years.

== History ==
=== Early years (1919–1970) ===
The stadium Nicola Ceravolo is set on a plot of land in the locality of Corallo, near the slopes of the mountain Spezzano. Its use dates back to the early decades of the twentieth century, when, coinciding with the beginning of the first world war, it was used as a concentration camp for prisoners of war. At the end of the war the plant, which was known as "Piazza d'Armi", began to be used for training troops stationed in Catanzaro, then the headquarters of the Division Command and the 19th Infantry Regiment.

In the 1920s, the ever-growing interest for sports, particularly for football, determined the adaptation of the structure to the new needs of the citizens. In October 1924, after about seven months of work, the new sports field, named the "Divisional Stadium", was presented with a successful inauguration. Owned by the 21st Division of the Military Division.

Soon after III Congresso Sportivo Calabrese happened here, which ended with the representation of hundreds of athletes divided into various sports disciplines.

A special football tournament was held, called Cup city of Catanzaro and Cosenza, in which three groups took part: Fortitudo Cosenza, the Audace of Catanzaro and the Nuovo Reggio Football Club. It was the Reggina team that won the trophy by beating the Audace in the final by 3–0.

The new "Divisional Stadium", later known as the "Military Stadium", was equipped with a leveled playing field, flanked by a "war path", an elevated runway and graceful wooden benches, well furnished inside. During the twenties, the plant will be used mainly by the military for their operational purposes, but also by sports companies with appropriate authorization.

In 1927, the Fascist Catanzaro Sports Union (a partnership born of the merger between Scalfaro and Braccini), chaired by Enrico Talamo, was included in the regional Third Division championship (comparable to the current Serie D), thus marking the entrance of the Catanzaro football in the national sports area.

This event suggested the military and civil authorities of the time, to regulate the use of the structure through a concession to the Municipality of Catanzaro.

In the following years, the plant was renamed "Stadio Comunale" and under the presidency of Aldo Ferrara (1950–1958), it was equipped with a functional and comfortable staircase (the Distinti), built on the old "lawn", with underlying showers, press room and warehouse.

=== Renovation and proposal for a new stadium (1971–2006) ===
The first major and radical restructuring took place in the summer of 1971. The US Catanzaro had just won its first historical promotion in Serie A and the municipality built a covered grandstand, to extend the curves and to add a press room to the summit of the distinguished sector, which would make the complex suitable for the contest of the prestigious tournament. The works were completed on 16 October 1971 and at the end of the renovation, the stadium had a capacity, though never officially determined, of around 20,000 seats. Further changes are made under the "Di Marzio" era. The Neapolitan coach convinces the Municipality to build further steps on existing ones, thus managing to bring the total capacity to 30,000 seats. These changes make the "Military" one of the largest stadiums in Southern Italy, despite the fact that the plant is not in compliance with the regulations of the time.

In 1989 the stadium was dedicated to Nicola Ceravolo, in recognition of fifty years of fervent and passionate activity for sport and for Catanzaro.

A monument will be dedicated to the Giallorossi president at the entrance to the "West Bend" sector, next to a sea pine that dominates the curve.

In 1996 the "West Bend", a sector populated by the hottest fringe of Catanzaro fans, was named after Massimo Capraro, a young ultra who died prematurely in a tragic car accident.

In 1998 the Municipality of Catanzaro was forced to perform various jobs to adapt the sports facility to the new regulations; among the innovations are replaced the old iron nets of Tribuna and Distinti with modern shatterproof glass.

The substitution of the nets will make the sectors of Tribuna and Distinti much closer to the playing field, making the athletic track disappear and, with it, the multi-functionality of the entire sports facility. These adjustments will lead to the capacity, officially determined by the provincial supervisory commission, of 11 033 seats.

With the return of the Catanzaro in Serie B, in the 2004–2005 season, some marginal jobs were carried out on the pitch and the video surveillance system.

Furthermore, the East bend for visiting fans was named after the historic footballer Angelo Mammì, who under that sector, on 30 January 1972, scored the decisive goal at the end of the second half which allowed Catanzaro to beat Juventus in the match valid for first day of return of the Serie A championship 1971–1972.

Between 2003 and 2004, the then administrators of the U.S. Catanzaro Massimo Poggi and Claudio Parente put forward the concrete proposal for the construction of a new stadium in a different urban area, presumably in the Germaneto quarter.

This would have ensured optimal connections to the new plant, as the area is easily accessible. The new stadium – based on the English model – approved to host UEFA international events, should have had a capacity of at least 28,000 seats and host various businesses, sports facilities, offices, restaurants, and a hotel.

The proposal to relocate the new stadium was received among the criticisms of the majority of fans, justified by the historical and symbolic value of the "old" Ceravolo stadium.

In 2004, the model of the renewed Ceravolo was presented at a press conference, which included the demolition of curves and distinct to reconstruct everything on the model of the Marassi Stadium in Genoa.

The projects were set aside following the failure of the Catanzaro Sports Union in the summer of 2006

=== From the Pisanu decree to the present day (2006–) ===
In the 2007–2008 season, following the approval of the Pisanu decree, the approved capacity of the Ceravolo stadium was reduced to 7499 places with the total closure of the separate sector and the East stand area.

In 2008 the ownership of the plant passed from the State Property to the Municipality of Catanzaro and on 18 September the works for the adaptation of the plant to the new regulations began, for an amount of approximately 2 million euros, giving way to the most important and massive structural intervention since the first promotion in Serie A (1971).

The most significant interventions concern the arrangement of seats and the numbering of seats, the division of sectors and the identification of escape routes, the installation of 15 turnstiles (750 people per hour), adequate toilets for spectators, lighting system, first aid stations, parking area with 200 seats for the "guest" sector, alarm systems, modernization of the press box and construction of an "interview room" close to the locker rooms.

During the works, in the summer of 2008, the historic marine pine that rose from the terraces of the Massimo Capraro curve was demolished, a unique detail among the stadiums throughout Italy.

The renovated Nicola Ceravolo stadium is a fully compliant facility, with an officially determined capacity of 14 650 seats, all numbered, and a glance determined by the laying of Giallorossi seats.
