= Tommaso Biasci =

Italian footballer

Personal information
- Date of birth: 10 November 1994 (age 32)
- Place of birth: San Giuliano Terme, Italy
- Height: 1.82 m (6 ft 0 in)
- Position: Forward

Team information
- Current team: Avellino
- Number: 14

Youth career
- Pisa
- 2009–2013: Livorno

Senior career*
Years	Team	Apps	(Gls)
2013–2015	Livorno	1	(0)
2014–2015	→ Lucchese (loan)	11	(2)
2015	→ Paganese (loan)	7	(0)
2015–2016	Ponsacco	26	(7)
2016–2017	Massese	32	(5)
2017–2019	Carrarese	74	(15)
2019–2021	Carpi	42	(22)
2020–2021	→ Padova (loan)	14	(3)
2021–2022	Padova	8	(1)
2022	→ Catanzaro (loan)	16	(7)
2022–2025	Catanzaro	103	(32)
2025–	Avellino	34	(12)
- * Club domestic league appearances and goals as of 10 May 2026

Tommaso Biasci (born 10 November 1994) is an Italian professional footballer who plays as a forward for Serie B club Avellino.

== Club career ==
A youth product of Pisa and Livorno, Biasci made his professional debut with Livorno coming on as a late sub with Livorno in a 2–0 Serie B win over Vicenza on 27 April 2013. He started his early career on loan with Lucchese and Paganese in the Serie C. After his contract expired with Livorno, he moved to the Serie D in stints with Ponsacco and Massese, before returning to the Serie C with Carrarese. In the summer of 2019, he signed with Carpi, and scored 16 goals in 27 games in his debut season.

On 8 January 2021, he joined Padova on loan with an obligation to buy.

On 20 January 2022, he moved on loan to Catanzaro with an option to buy.

On 1 September 2025, Biasci signed a two-year contract with Avellino.
