= Fidelis Andria 2018 =

Italian football club

Fidelis Andria
- Full name: Fidelis Andria 2018
- Nickname: Leoni Azzurri (Blue Lions)
- Founded: 1971 (as AS Fidelis Andria); 2005 (as AS Andria BAT) (refounded); 2013 (as SS Fidelis Andria 1928)(refounded); 2018 (as SSD Fidelis Andria 2018)(refounded)
- Ground: Stadio Degli Ulivi; Andria, Italy
- Capacity: 9,140
- Chairman: Giuseppe Di Benedetto
- Manager: Ciro Danucci
- League: Serie D Group H
- 2023–24: Serie D Group H, 4th of 18
- Website: http://www.fidelisandria.it/
Home colours	Away colours

Fidelis Andria 2018 or simply Fidelis Andria is an Italian football club based in Andria, Apulia. The club was founded in 1971 and re-founded in 2005, 2013 and 2018. The team competes in Serie D Group H.

Fidelis Andria play their home matches at Stadio Degli Ulivi, which has a capacity of 9,140. The stadium is located in Andria itself.

== History ==
=== A.S. Fidelis Andria (1971–2005) ===
The club was founded in 1971 as A.S. Fidelis Andria (Associazione Sportiva Fidelis Andria). At that time, the club wore red and yellow, and it was the second club in town.

In 1978, following the collapse of A.S. Andria, the club decided to adopt blue and white, the traditional colours of the town.

With these colours, the club played for years in the Serie B and Serie C1: last playing in Serie B in 1999.

After the 2004–05 season, the club declared bankruptcy.

=== A.S. Andria BAT (2005–2013) ===
AS Andria BAT crest

In summer 2005, the club was refounded as A.S. Andria BAT (Associazione Sportiva Andria BAT). The BAT stood for Barletta-Andria-Trani, as in the province of Barletta-Andria-Trani.

The team played in the Lega Pro Seconda Divisione from the 2005–06 to 2008–09 seasons.

At the end of the 2008–09 Lega Pro Seconda Divisione season, the team was admitted into Lega Pro Prima Divisione after the forced relegation of Avellino in Serie D. At the end of the 2012–13 Lega Pro Prima Divisione season, the club was relegated after the play-offs, but didn't enroll in the Lega Pro Seconda Divisione league.

=== S.S. Fidelis Andria 1928 (2013–2018) ===
In its place, in summer 2013, a new team called S.S.D. Fidelis Andria 1928 was founded and admitted to Eccellenza Apulia.

The team ended the season 2013–2014 in 2nd place. After winning the national play-offs, Fidelis Andria were promoted to Serie D, the top level of the Italian non-professional football association.

In season 2014–15, Fidelis Andria played in Group H of Serie D. On April 26, after winning 3–2 away at Cavese, the club was promoted to Lega Pro, the third-highest football division in Italy, two matches before the end of the regular season. After the regular season, Fidelis Andria took part in the Scudetto Serie D tournament, in order to assign the amateur champions' title. The team was eliminated in the group stages.

Since July 1, 2015, having become a member of the Italian Professional Football League (Lega Italiana Calcio Professionistico), commonly known as Lega Pro, the club changed its name in S.S. Fidelis Andria 1928.

Fidelis Andria ended the season 2015–16 at 7th place, which allowed the club to participate in the next 2016–17 Coppa Italia. On May 7, after the last match of the season in Catania, boss Luca D'Angelo announced he wouldn't renew his contract with the club.

=== Fidelis Andria 2018 (2018–present) ===
In July 2018 the club was declared bankrupt and was denied registration for the upcoming Serie C, based on Covisoc's assessment. On the date of the deadline for Serie D registration, a group of investors led by Marco Di Vincenzo formed S.S.D. Fidelis Andria 2018 as a reincarnation of S.S. Fidelis Andria 1928 to assume its sporting title. The reborn club was admitted to Serie D.

In 2021, Fidelis Andria was admitted to play in Serie C to fill a league vacancy. The club played two seasons in the Serie C before being relegated back to Serie D in 2023.

== Colors and crest ==
The team's colors are blue and white. The club crest, representing a rampant lion, is based on elements from the city of Andria's badge.

== Current squad ==
As of 13 August 2024

Note: Flags indicate national team as defined under FIFA eligibility rules; some limited exceptions apply. Players may hold more than one non-FIFA nationality.

No.	Pos.	Nation	Player
—	GK	ITA	Ivan Castiglione
—	DF	DOM	Tano Bonnin
—	DF	ITA	Alex Sirri
—	MF	BRA	Gladestony
—	DF	ITA	Davide Derosa
—	MF	FRA	Mathieu Coquin
—	DF	ITA	Elia Giampa
—	MF	ITA	Giuseppe La Monica
—	MF	ITA	Lorenzo Liurni
—	DF	ITA	Alessandro De Luca
—	GK	ITA	Alexander Iacovino
—	MF	ALB	Daniel Babaj
—	FW	GAM	Lamin Jallow

No.	Pos.	Nation	Player
—	MF	ITA	Crocefisso Cancelli
—	MF	ITA	Mattia Carriola
—	FW	BRA	Mateus Castro Da Silva
—	GK	ITA	Andrea Esposito
—	MF	ITA	Tommaso Fantacci
—	DF	ITA	Michele Ferrara
—	FW	ARG	Augustìn Marsico
—	MF	ITA	Luca Monterisi
—	GK	ITA	Luigi Pellegrini
—	MF	ITA	Andrea Risolo
—	DF	ITA	Matteo Savarese

== Notable former players ==
- (Italy) Nicola Amoruso
- (Italy) Marco Capparella
- (Italy) Bernardo Corradi
- (Italy) Cristiano Lupatelli
- (Palestine) Bruno Pesce
- (Slovenia) Matjaž Florijančič
- (Chile) Adolfo Ovalle
