= 2025–26 SS Juve Stabia season =

SS Juve Stabia
2025–26 season
- Manager: Ignazio Abate
- Stadium: Stadio Romeo Menti
- Serie B: 7th
- Coppa Italia: Round of 32
- Biggest defeat: Lecce 2–0 Juve Stabia

The 2025–26 season is the 119th in the history of Società Sportiva Juve Stabia and the club’s second consecutive season in Serie B. In addition to the domestic league, the team competed in the Coppa Italia. The season began on 15 August 2025.

== Squad ==
=== Transfers In ===
Pos.	Player	Transferred from	Fee	Date	Source
MF	(Italy) Flavio Di Dio	(Italy) Lecco	Loan return	30 June 2025	
MF	(Italy) Pasquale Faccetti	(Italy) Città Di Sant’Agata	Loan return	30 June 2025	
DF	(Italy) Francesco D'Amore	(Italy) Ascoli	Loan return	30 June 2025	
MF	(Slovenia) Elian Demirović	(Italy) Giugliano	Loan return	30 June 2025	
MF	(Tunisia) Alessandro Louati	(Italy) Pro Vercelli	Undisclosed	1 July 2025	
GK	(Italy) Alessandro Confente	(Italy) Vicenza	Free	9 July 2025	
FW	(Croatia) Tomi Petrović	(Italy) Trento	Free	10 July 2025	
DF	(Italy) Lorenzo Carissoni	(Italy) Cittadella	Loan	12 July 2025	
MF	(Italy) Giacomo De Pieri	(Italy) Inter U20	Loan	24 July 2025	
MF	(Italy) Thomas Battistella	(Italy) Modena	Undisclosed	29 July 2025	
FW	(Romania) Rareș Burnete	(Italy) Lecce	Loan	29 July 2025	
MF	(Italy) Mattia Mannini	(Italy) AS Roma	Loan	1 August 2025	
DF	(Italy) Giacomo Stabile	(Italy) Inter U23	Loan	5 August 2025	
MF	(Italy) Alessio Cacciamani	(Italy) Torino U20	Loan	13 August 2025	
DF	(Italy) Filippo Reale	(Italy) Roma U20	Loan	18 August 2025	
FW	(Italy) Alessandro Gabrielloni	(Italy) Como	Loan	30 August 2025	
MF	(Italy) Federico Zuccon	(Italy) Atalanta U23	Loan	1 September 2025	
MF	(Italy) Aaron Ciammaglichella	(Italy) Torino	Loan	1 September 2025	
MF	(France) Omar Correia	(Italy) Triestina	Undisclosed	1 September 2025	
MF	(Italy) Edoardo Duca	Unattached		2 September 2025	

=== Transfers Out ===
Pos.	Player	Transferred to	Fee	Date	Source
DF	(Italy) Yuri Rocchetti	(Italy) Cremonese	Loan return	30 June 2025	
FW	(Lithuania) Edgaras Dubickas	(Italy) Pisa	Loan return	30 June 2025	
DF	(Italy) Romano Floriani Mussolini	(Italy) Lazio	Loan return	30 June 2025	
DF	(Poland) Patryk Peda	(Italy) Palermo	Loan return	30 June 2025	
DF	(Italy) Niccolò Fortini	(Italy) Fiorentina	Loan return	30 June 2025	
GK	(Slovenia) Kristjan Matošević	(Italy) Triestina	Loan return	30 June 2025	
FW	(Senegal) Demba Thiam	(Italy) SPAL	Loan return	30 June 2025	
MF	(Italy) Flavio Di Dio	(Italy) Casarano	Undisclosed	12 July 2025	
FW	(Italy) Andrea Adorante	(Italy) Venezia	Undisclosed	12 July 2025	
MF	(Slovenia) Elian Demirović	(Slovenia) ND Primorje	Loan	16 July 2025	
MF	(Italy) Marco Meli	(Italy) Arezzo	Loan	30 July 2025	
MF	(Italy) Enrico Piovanello	(Italy) Crotone	Loan	8 August 2025	
FW	(Croatia) Tomi Petrović	(Italy) Treviso	Loan	12 August 2025	
MF	(Italy) Pasquale Faccetti	(Italy) Athletic Club Palermo	Free	21 August 2025	
MF	(Italy) Davide Buglio	(Italy) Catanzaro	Loan	1 September 2025	
MF	(Tunisia) Alessandro Louati	(Italy) Triestina	Loan	1 September 2025	
DF	(Italy) Francesco D'Amore	(Italy) Triestina	Loan	1 September 2025	

== Friendlies ==
2 August 2025	Juve Stabia	6–1	Sarnese
15:45

7 August 2025	Juve Stabia	1–0	Potenza
18:00

== Competitions ==
=== Overall record ===
Competition	First match	Last match	Starting round	Final position	Record							
Competition	First match	Last match	Starting round	Final position	Pld	W	D	L	GF	GA	GD	Win %
Serie B	23 August 2025	8–10 May 2026	Matchday 1		4	1	3	0	4	2	+2	25.00
Coppa Italia	15 August 2025		Round of 32	Round of 32	1	0	0	1	0	2	−2	0.00
Total					5	1	3	1	4	4	+0	20.00

Last updated: 20 September 2025
Source: Competitions

=== Serie B ===
==== League table ====
Pos	Team	Pld	W	D	L	GF	GA	GD	Pts	Promotion, qualification or relegation
5	Catanzaro	38	15	14	9	62	51	+11	59	Qualification for promotion play-offs preliminary round
6	Modena	38	15	10	13	49	36	+13	55	Qualification for promotion play-offs preliminary round
7	Juve Stabia	38	11	18	9	44	45	−1	51	Qualification for promotion play-offs preliminary round
8	Avellino	38	13	10	15	43	55	−12	49	Qualification for promotion play-offs preliminary round
9	Mantova	38	13	7	18	45	57	−12	46 (Note: Head-to-head points: Mantova 9, Padova 4, Cesena 4. Head-to-head goal difference: Padova −1, Cesena −3.)	

Source: Serie BKT
Rules for classification: 1) Points; 2) Head-to-head points; 3) Head-to-head goal difference; 4) Goal difference; 5) Goals scored; 6) Draw.
(Note: Head-to-head record is used only after all the matches between the teams in question have been played)

==== Results summary ====
Overall								Home						Away					
Pld	W	D	L	GF	GA	GD	Pts	W	D	L	GF	GA	GD	W	D	L	GF	GA	GD
38	11	18	9	44	45	−1	51	8	9	2	25	14	+11	3	9	7	19	31	−12

==== Results by round ====
Round	1	2	3	4
Ground	A	H	H	A
Result	D	D	D	W
Position	9	13	14	

Updated to match(es) played on 20 September 2025. Source:
A = Away; H = Home; W = Win; D = Draw; L = Loss

==== Matches ====
23 August 2025 1	Virtus Entella	1–1	Juve Stabia	Chiavari
18:00 UTC+2	Marconi 60'; Nichetti (yellow card) 88'; Mezzoni (yellow card) 90+4'		Candellone 47', (yellow card) 53'; Leone (yellow card) 66'	Stadium: Stadio Enrico Sannazzari; Attendance: 2,306; Referee: Andrea Calzavara

30 August 2025 2	Juve Stabia	0–0	Venezia	Castellammare di Stabia
18:00 UTC+2	Burnete (yellow card) 16'; Cacciamani (yellow card) 75'		Yeboah (red card) 37'; Doumbia (yellow card) 45+1'	Stadium: Stadio Romeo Menti; Attendance: 3,943; Referee: Daniele Perenzoni

13 September 2025 3	Juve Stabia	0–0	Reggiana	Castellammare di Stabia
14:00 UTC+2	Mosti (yellow card) 21'; Mannini (yellow card) 70'; Ruggero (yellow card) 88'; Correia (yellow card) 88'			Stadium: Stadio Romeo Menti; Attendance: 2,199; Referee: Mario Perri

20 September 2025 4	Spezia	1–3	Juve Stabia	La Spezia
14:00 UTC+2	Soleri 59'		Correia 2', (yellow card) 64'; Carissoni 19'; Pierobon (yellow card) 45'; Candellone 61'; Ruggero (yellow card) 79'	Stadium: Stadio Alberto Picco; Attendance: 8,488; Referee: Luca Massimi

26 September 2025 5	Catanzaro	2–2	Juve Stabia	Catanzaro
19:30 UTC+2	Bettella (yellow card) 19'; Antonini (yellow card) 30'; Verrngia 53'; Iemmello 71'		Gabrielloni 21'; Cacciamani (yellow card) 25' (red card) 45+1'; Pierobon (yellow card) 36'; Carissoni 44', (yellow card) 72'; Burnete (yellow card) 64'; Piscopo (yellow card) 90+4'	Stadium: Stadio Nicola Ceravolo; Attendance: 8,884; Referee: Juan Luca Sacchi

30 September 2025 6	Juve Stabia	2–1	Mantova	Castellammare di Stabia
19:30 UTC+2	Ruggero 5'; Candellone 20'; Mosti (yellow card) 40'; Confente (yellow card) 74'		Trimboli (yellow card) 45'; Paoletti (yellow card) 71'; Radaelli (yellow card) 81'; Mancuso 90+4'	Stadium: Stadio Romeo Menti; Attendance: 3,814; Referee: Andrea Calzavara

5 October 2025 7	Carrarese	3–0	Juve Stabia	Carrara
14:00 UTC+2	Schiavi 10' (pen.); Bouah (yellow card) 38'; Imperiale (yellow card) 61'; Hasa 77'; Zanon 86'		Maistro (yellow card) 25'; Mosti (yellow card) 57'; De Pieri (yellow card) 90+1'; Leone (yellow card) 90+3'	Stadium: Stadio dei Marmi; Attendance: 2,616; Referee: Paride Tremolada

18 October 2025 8	Juve Stabia	2–0	Avellino	Castellammare di Stabia
16:15 UTC+2	Mosti 39'; Bellich 42'; Candellone (yellow card) 49'; Correia (yellow card) 68'		Cagnano (yellow card) 68'; Insigne (red card) 90+4'	Stadium: Stadio Romeo Menti; Attendance: 5,280; Referee: Giuseppe Mucera

26 October 2025 9	Padova	2–2	Juve Stabia	Padua
15:00 UTC+2	Bortolussi 17' (pen.), 73'; Crisetig (yellow card) 23'; Faedo (yellow card) 83'		Piscopo (yellow card) 10'; Cacciamani 45+1'; Burnete (yellow card) 56'; De Pieri 68'	Stadium: Stadio Euganeo; Attendance: 7,357; Referee: Claudio Giuseppe Allegretta

2 November 2025 11	Modena	3–0	Juve Stabia	Modena
15:00 UTC+2	Nieling 14'; Gliozzi 69' (pen.); Santoro (yellow card) 81'; Ruggero 90' (o.g.)		Bellich (yellow card) 56'; Piscopo (yellow card) 84'; Gabrielloni (yellow card) 90+1'	Stadium: Stadio Alberto Braglia; Attendance: 9,271; Referee: Federico Dionisi

8 November 2025 12	Juve Stabia	1–0	Palermo	Castellammare di Stabia
17:15 UTC+2	Cacciamani 38'; Candellone (yellow card) 87'	Report	Palumbo (yellow card) 20'; Brunori (yellow card) 31'; Augello (yellow card) 72'; Pierozzi (yellow card) 73'; Ranocchia (yellow card) 84' (red card) 90'; Corona (yellow card) 90+5'	Stadium: Stadio Romeo Menti; Attendance: 3,893; Referee: Matteo Marchetti

24 November 2025 13	Sampdoria	1–0	Juve Stabia	Genoa
20:30 UTC+2	Coda 58' (pen.); Depaoli (yellow card) 58'	Report	Ruggero (yellow card) 38' (red card) 56'; Gabrielloni (yellow card) 58'; Giorgini (yellow card) 88'; De Pieri (yellow card) 90+8'	Stadium: Stadio Luigi Ferraris; Attendance: 21,239; Referee: Luca Zufferli

30 November 2025 14	Juve Stabia	2–2	Monza	Castellammare di Stabia
15:00 UTC+2	Stabile (yellow card) 18'; Candellone 31'; Gabrielloni (yellow card) 71'; Maistro 83'		Birindelli 19', (yellow card) 49'; Ciurria (yellow card) 26'; Ravanelli (yellow card) 28'; Izzo (yellow card) 64'; Petagna 68'; Thiam (yellow card) 71'	Stadium: Stadio Romeo Menti; Attendance: 3,986; Referee: Claudio Giuseppe Allegretta

4 December 2025 15	Juve Stabia	0–0	Bari	Castellammare di Stabia
19:30 UTC+2	Pierobon (yellow card) 1'; Cacciamani (yellow card) 51'; Piscopo (yellow card) 57'; Correia (yellow card) 88'		Castrovilli (yellow card) 25'; Dorval (yellow card) 38'; Partipilo (yellow card) 90+5'	Stadium: Stadio Romeo Menti; Attendance: 3,501; Referee: Rosario Abisso

8 December 2025 15	Frosinone	3–0	Juve Stabia	Frosinone
15:00 UTC+2	Kvernadze 45+1', 65'; Calvani 61'		Mosti (yellow card) 36'; Leone (yellow card) 87'	Stadium: Stadio Benito Stirpe; Attendance: 10,541; Referee: Daniele Perenzoni

13 December 2025 16	Juve Stabia	2–0	Empoli	Castellammare di Stabia
15:00 UTC+2	Giorgini 12', (yellow card) 90'; Correia (yellow card) 40'; Carissoni 63'; Cacciamani (yellow card) 74'; Leone (yellow card) 77'		Fulignati (yellow card) 40'; Shpendi (yellow card) 72'	Stadium: Stadio Romeo Menti; Attendance: 3,632; Referee: Alberto Arena

20 December 2025 17	Cesena	1–1	Juve Stabia	Cesena
15:00 UTC+2	Bastoni 42', (yellow card) 32' (red card) 62'; Adamo (yellow card) 56'		Mosti (yellow card) 11'; Bellich 29'; Burnete (yellow card) 89'	Stadium: Stadio Dino Manuzzi; Attendance: 11,806; Referee: Niccolò Turrini

27 December 2025 18	Juve Stabia	1–0	Südtirol	Castellammare di Stabia
15:00 UTC+2	Maistro 19'; Burnete (yellow card) 68'		Tronchin (yellow card) 48'; Kofler (yellow card) 79'; Davi (yellow card) 86'	Stadium: Stadio Romeo Menti; Attendance: 4,956; Referee: Livio Marinelli

10 January 2026 19	Juve Stabia	2–2	Pescara	Castellammare di Stabia
17:15 UTC+2	Mosti (yellow card) 33'; Ruggero (yellow card) 52'; Correia 68'; Candellone 89' (pen.)		Olzer 35'; Brosco (yellow card) 44'; Capellini (yellow card) 56'; Corazza (yellow card) 80'; Valzania (yellow card) 82'; Sgarbi 90+3', (yellow card) 90+4'	Stadium: Stadio Romeo Menti; Attendance: 3,688; Referee: Marco Piccinini

17 January 2026 20	Bari	0–1	Juve Stabia	Bari
19:30 UTC+2	Braunöder (yellow card) 62'		Candellone 37' (pen.); Giorgini (yellow card) 46'; Zeroli (yellow card) 47'; Piscopo (yellow card) 48'; Carissoni (yellow card) 74'	Stadium: Stadio San Nicola; Attendance: 8,429; Referee: Davide Di Marco

24 January 2026 21	Juve Stabia	1–0	Virtus Entella	Castellammare di Stabia
15:00 UTC+2	Candellone 13'; Leone (yellow card) 31'		Tiritiello (yellow card) 8'; Di Mario (yellow card) 90'	Stadium: Stadio Romeo Menti; Referee: Giuseppe Mucera

1 February 2026 22	Reggiana	1–1	Juva Stabia	Reggio Emilia
15:00 UTC+2	Gondo 30'; Portanova (yellow card) 63'; Papetti (yellow card) 71'		Mosti 2'; Giorgini (yellow card) 40'	Stadium: Mapei Stadium – Città del Tricolore; Attendance: 7,702; Referee: Ermanno Feliciani

7 February 2026 23	Juve Stabia	3–3	Padova	Castellammare di Stabia
15:00 UTC+2	Leone (yellow card) 19'; Gabrielloni 28' (pen.); Zeroli 50'; Burnete 80'; Ricciardi (yellow card) 90+1'		Perrotta (yellow card) 1'; Fusi (yellow card) 47'; Sgarbi 70'; Capelli 86', (yellow card) 90+8'; Bortolussi 89'	Stadium: Stadio Romeo Menti; Attendance: 3,679; Referee: Andrea Zanotti

11 February 2026 24	Empoli	1–2	Juve Stabia	Empoli
20:00 UTC+2	Lovato 11', (yellow card) 80'		Leone 57'; Carissoni 64'	Stadium: Stadio Carlo Castellani; Attendance: 5,749; Referee: Valerio Crezzini

15 February 2026 25	Monza	2–1	Juve Stabia	Monza
15:00 UTC+2	Hernani 51'; Petagna 64'		Mosti 2'	Stadium: Stadio Brianteo; Attendance: 5,322; Referee: Niccolò Turrini

22 February 2026 26	Juve Stabia	1–2	Modena	Castellammare di Stabia
15:00 UTC+2	Bellich (yellow card) 47'; Gabrielloni (yellow card) 55'; Cacciamani (yellow card) 57'; Mosti 74'; Diakité (yellow card) 90+7'		Zanimacchia 3', (yellow card) 87'; Tonoli (yellow card) 20' (red card) 79'; Zampano 23'; Ambrosino (yellow card) 41'	Stadium: Stadio Romeo Menti; Attendance: 4,408; Referee: Giovanni Ayroldi

28 February 2026 27	Avellino	0–0	Juve Stabia	Avellino
19:30 UTC+2	Šimić (yellow card) 60'; Besaggio (yellow card) 75'; Palmiero (yellow card) 78'		Correia (yellow card) 73'	Stadium: Stadio Partenio-Adriano Lombardi; Attendance: 9,500; Referee: Maria Sole Ferrieri Caputi

4 March 2026 28	Juve Stabia	1–1	Sampdoria	Castellammare di Stabia
20:00 UTC+2	Correia 89'	Report	Di Pardo 90+3'	Stadium: Stadio Romeo Menti; Attendance: 4,494; Referee: Giuseppe Collu

8 March 2026 29	Mantova	2–0	Juve Stabia	Mantua
15:00 UTC+2	Bragantini 21'; Mancuso 45+3'; Benaïssa-Yahia (yellow card) 47'; Radaeli (yellow card) 57'		Pierobon (yellow card) 10' (red card) 26'; Correia (yellow card) 38'; Diakité (yellow card) 52'; Cacciamani (yellow card) 57'; Mannini (yellow card) 83'; Mura (yellow card) 85'; Mosti (yellow card) 90+1'	Stadium: Stadio Danilo Martelli; Attendance: 8,047; Referee: Ivano Pezzuto

14 March 2026 30	Juve Stabia	1–1	Carrarese	Castellammare di Stabia
15:00 UTC+2	Mosti 33'; Confente (yellow card) 45+3'; Gabrielloni (yellow card) 80'		Oliana (yellow card) 26'; Torregrossa 77' (pen.)	Stadium: Stadio Romeo Menti; Attendance: 3,481; Referee: Paride Tremolada

17 March 2026 31	Palermo	2–2	Juve Stabia	Palermo
19:00 UTC+2	Joronen (yellow card) 9'; Pohjanpalo 60' (pen.); Bani 65', (yellow card) 71'; Modesto (yellow card) 76'; Magnani (yellow card) 87'	Report	Leone 11' (pen.); Torrasi (yellow card) 44'; Giorgini (yellow card) 56'; Confente (yellow card) 60'; Varnier (yellow card) 63'; Mosti 73'; Kassama (yellow card) 90+6'	Stadium: Stadio Renzo Barbera; Attendance: 23,733; Referee: Federico Dionisi

21 March 2026 32	Juve Stabia	3–1	Spezia	Castellammare di Stabia
15:00 UTC+2	Leone 45+2' (pen.); Pierobon 74'; Okoro 89'		Aurelio 32'; Beruatto (yellow card) 37'; Bonfanti (yellow card) 52'; Adamo (yellow card) 56'; Hristov (yellow card) 90+6'	Stadium: Stadio Romeo Menti; Attendance: 3,403; Referee: Davide Di Marco

6 April 2026 33	Venezia	3–1	Juve Stabia	Venice
14:00 UTC+2	Giorgini 39' (o.g.); Adorante 45+3', 74'; Busio (yellow card) 70'; Svoboda (yellow card) 71'; Sagrado (yellow card) 79'		Giorgini (yellow card) 36'; Carissoni 45'; Bellich (yellow card) 45+3'	Stadium: Stadio Pier Luigi Penzo; Attendance: 10,956; Referee: Mario Perri

11 April 2026 34	Juve Stabia	2–0	Cesena	Castellammare di Stabia
14:00 UTC+2	Varnier 51'; Carissoni 63'; Correia (yellow card) 67'		Bastoni (yellow card) 38'; Bisoli (yellow card) 55'	Stadium: Stadio Romeo Menti; Attendance: 3,403; Referee: Maria Sole Ferrieri Caputi

18 April 2026 35	Juve Stabia	1–1	Catanzaro	Castellammare di Stabia
18:30 UTC+2	Mosti 18'; Torrasi (yellow card) 61'; Okoro (yellow card) 75'		Cassandro (yellow card) 83'; Di Francesco 88'	Stadium: Stadio Romeo Menti; Attendance: 6,118; Referee: Niccolò Turrini

25 April 2026 36	Pescara	1–1	Juve Stabia	Pescara
14:00 UTC+2	Insigne 51'; Valzania (yellow card) 57'; Altare (yellow card) 90+5'		Ricciardi (yellow card) 23'; Cacciamani (yellow card) 34'; Diakité (yellow card) 50'; Correia (yellow card) 57', (goal) 61'	Stadium: Stadio Adriatico – Giovanni Cornacchia; Attendance: 13,823; Referee: Daniele Perenzoni

1 May 2026 37	Juve Stabia	0–1	Frosinone	Castellammare di Stabia
14:00 UTC+2			Bracaglia 73'	Stadium: Stadio Romeo Menti; Attendance: 5,237; Referee: Matteo Marcenaro

8 May 2026 38	Südtirol	1–1	Juve Stabia	Bolzano
19:30 UTC+2	Črnigoj 60'; Zedadka (yellow card) 90'		Gabrielloni 36'	Stadium: Stadio Druso; Attendance: 5,064; Referee: Livio Marinelli

=== Coppa Italia ===
15 August 2025 Round of 32	Lecce	2–0	Juve Stabia	Lecce
20:45 UTC+2	Krstović 27' (pen.); Banda (red card) 45+4'; Kaba 90+5'			Stadium: Stadio Via del mare Referee: Giuseppe Mucera
