= San Francesco, Civitella del Tronto =

Church in Civitella del Tronto, Italy

Coordinates: 42.7721°N 13.6676°E

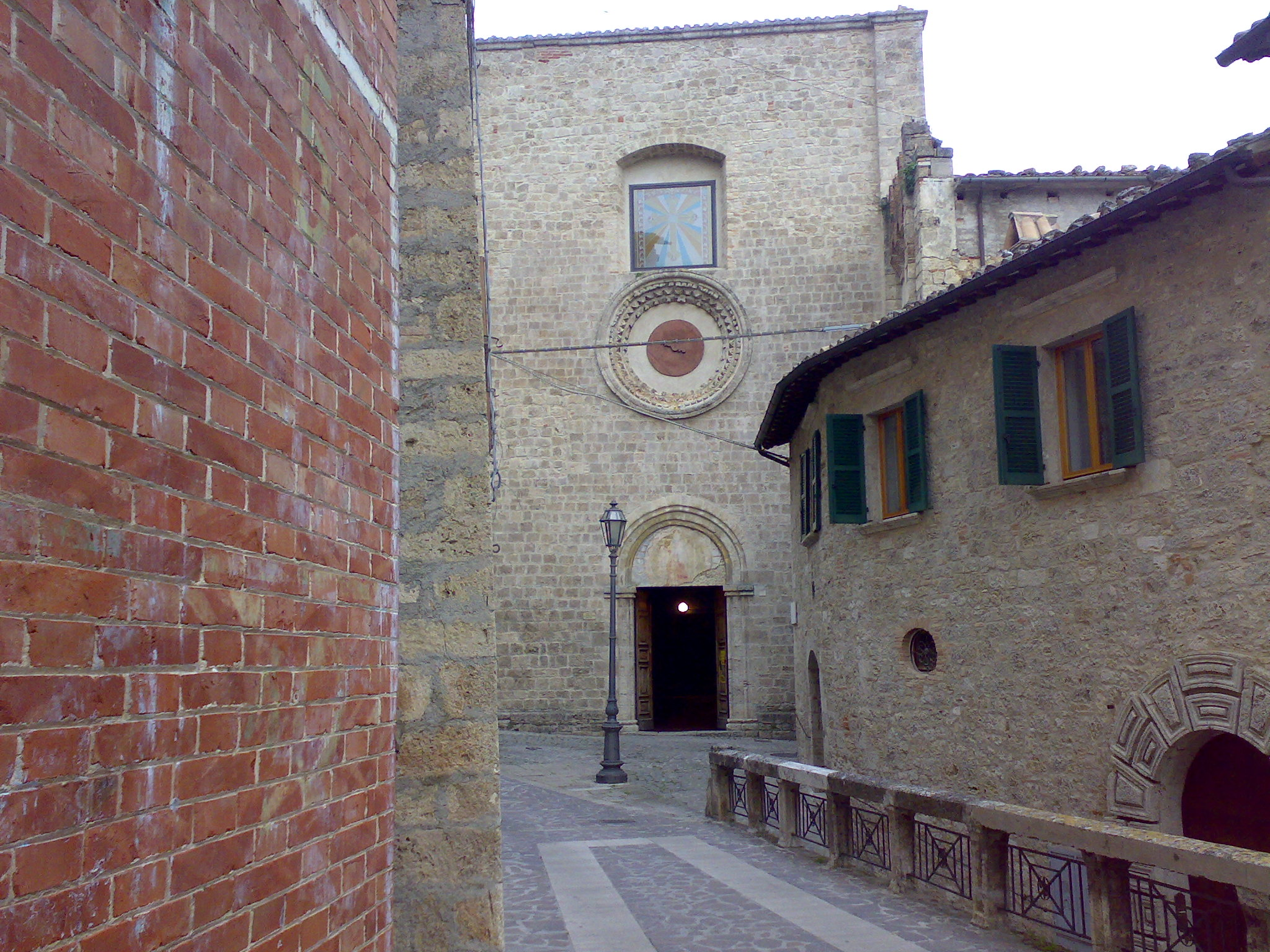
San Francesco, Civitella del Tronto.

San Francesco is a Romanesque and Gothic-style Roman Catholic church located in the town of Civitella del Tronto, in the province of Teramo, Abruzzo, Italy.

== History ==
This church was initially dedicated to San Ludovico; but rebuilt in 1326, under the patronage of Robert of Anjou and Fra’ Guglielmo, a member of the family of De Savola, which included the Bishop of Alba, and later archbishop of Brindisi and Benevento. After various suppressions, the adjacent Franciscan convent was closed finally in 1866.

The façade has a large rose window. The interior refurbished in Baroque style still houses a 15th-century cherry wood choir seats, with twisting columns. The nave columns retain Romanesque capitals. Much of its decoration was moved in 1924 to the church of Santa Maria dei Lumi; its former silver cross is now in the church of San Lorenzo. The monastery in 2016 houses a private restaurant and offices of the city hall.
