= Giuseppe Aquino =

Giuseppe Aquino may refer to:

- Giuseppe Aquino (footballer, born 1979), German-born Italian footballer
- Giuseppe Aquino (footballer, born 1983), Italian footballer
