= Favale =

Favale may refer to several places:

- Favale, Abruzzo, town
- Favale di Malvaro, in Genoa

== See also ==
- Favale (surname)
