= Luigi Cipriani =

Italian footballer

Personal information
- Date of birth: 7 January 1980 (age 46)
- Place of birth: Frosinone, Italy
- Height: 1.82 m (5 ft 11 1/2 in)
- Position: Defender

Senior career*
| Years | Team | Apps | (Gls) |
| 1997–2000 | Anagni | | |
| 2000–2002 | Ferentino | | |
| 2002–2003 | Veroli | | |
| 2003–2006 | Frosinone | 17 | (0) |
| 2004–2005 | → Cavese (loan) | 30 | (0) |
| 2006–2011 | Cavese | 117 | (8) |
| 2011 | Andria | 1 | (0) |
| 2011–2021 | Astrea | 63 | (0) |
- * Club domestic league appearances and goals

Luigi Cipriani (born 7 January 1980) is an Italian former footballer.

== Biography ==
Born in Frosinone, Lazio region, Cipriani started his senior career at Serie D club Anagni, located in the Province of Frosinone. In 2000 the club relegated to Eccellenza Lazio. In 2000–01 season he left for fellow Eccellenza club Ferentino, which also located in the Province of Frosinone. The club won the champion of Group B and promoted. Cipriani played 21 times for Ferentino in 2001–02 Serie D. In 2002, he was signed by another Eccellenza club Veroli, another Province of Frosinone club.

=== Frosinone ===
In 2003, he was signed by Frosinone Calcio, where he made 7 appearances in 2003–04 Serie C2. In 2004, he left for Campania club Cavese in temporary deal. Cipriani finished as the losing finalists of promotion playoffs of 2004–05 Serie C2.

Cipriani returned to Frosinone in 2005; he made 10 appearances in 2005–06 Serie C1. The club promoted to Serie B as the playoffs winner. However, he was sold to Cavese in co-ownership at the start of season, rejoining team-mate Giuseppe Aquino and Pietro De Giorgio.

=== Cavese ===
Cipriani joined Cavese in 2006 in co-ownership deal. In June 2007 Frosinone gave up the remain registration rights to Cavese. Cipriani spent 5 seasons with the club in Lega Pro Prima Divisione (ex-Serie C1). In summer 2011 the Cava de' Tirreni based club bankrupted.

=== Andria ===
In July 2011 Cipriani joined A.S. Andria BAT. He was released on 28 October.

=== Astrea ===
In November 2011 he joined Italian Serie D club Astrea.

== Honours ==
- Serie C2: 2004 (Frosinone)
