= Favale (surname) =

Favale is an Italian surname. Notable people with the surname include:

- Abigail Favale, American academic
- Gabriel Favale (born 1967), Argentinian football referee
- Giulio Favale (born 1998), Italian football player
- Giuseppe Rocco Favale (1935–2018), Italian Roman Catholic bishop
- Vincent Favale (born 1959), American entertainment industry professional
