= Aquino (surname) =

The surname Aquino comes from one of the historic noble houses in Italy. Although Jure Francorum lived, as Benedetto Croce attests, the family was, however, of Lombard blood, as it came from Radoaldo, who had been Aquino's possessor in the time of the dukes of Benevento. The Aquinos were counted among the seven great houses of the Kingdom of Naples. Among its most prominent members, the family includes the famous saint Thomas Aquinas.

== Persons with the surname Aquino ==
=== Aquino family ===
The Aquino Family is a political family based in Tarlac and Pampanga, in the Philippines. Here are the following:

- Benigno Aquino Sr. (1894–1947), Filipino politician
- Benigno Aquino Jr. (1932–1983), Filipino politician and son of Benigno Aquino Sr.
- Benigno Aquino III (1960–2021), Filipino politician, son of Benigno Aquino Jr. and Corazon Aquino, and the 15th president of the Philippines
- Corazon Aquino (1933–2009), Filipina politician, wife of Benigno Aquino Jr., and 11th president of the Philippines
- Kris Aquino (born 1971), Filipina television personality and daughter of Benigno Aquino Jr and Corazon Aquino.
- Paolo Benigno "Bam" Aquino IV (born 1977), Filipino politician and cousin of Benigno Aquino III

=== Others with the surname ===
- Thomas of Aquino, Italian theologian and philosopher
- Amy Aquino, American actress
- Angel Aquino (born 1973), Filipina actress
- Anthony Aquino (born 1982), Canadian-born Italian ice hockey player
- Aristides Aquino, Dominican baseball player
- Carlo Aquino (born 1985), Filipino actor and singer
- Daniel Aquino, retired Argentine footballer
- Dylan Aquino (born 2005), Argentine footballer
- Ella Aquino (1902–1988), Native American civil rights activist
- Francesco Ferdinando d'Ávalos Aquino, Governor of the Duchy of Milan, Italy
- Giuseppe Aquino (born 1979), German-born Italian footballer
- Giuseppe Aquino (born 1983), Italian footballer
- Greg Aquino, MLB pitcher
- Jairus Aquino (born 1999), Filipino actor
- Javier Aquino, Mexican footballer
- Jayson Aquino, MLB pitcher
- Jose Aquino II (born 1956), Filipino politician
- Luis Aquino, Puerto Rican baseball player
- Michael A. Aquino, former US military officer and founder of the Temple of Set
- Michael Ray Aquino, former Filipino intelligence officer
- Osvaldo Aquino (1952–2025), Paraguayan football player and coach
- Rey Aquino (born 1954), Filipino politician and surgeon
- Roldan Aquino (1942–2014), Filipino actor and director
- Salvatore Aquino, Italian criminal
- Sonia Aquino, Italian actress
- Ubaldo Aquino, Paraguayan football referee
- Val Aquino Okimoto, American politician
