= President Aquino =

President Aquino may refer to:

- Corazon Aquino (1933–2009), 11th president of the Philippines
- Benigno Aquino III (1960–2021), 15th president of the Philippines and son of the 11th president

== See also ==
- Aquino (surname)
