= Alvin Okoro =

Italian footballer (born 2005)

Personal information
- Full name: Alvin Obinna Okoro
- Date of birth: 26 March 2005 (age 21)
- Place of birth: Vicenza, Italy
- Height: 1.82 m (6 ft 0 in)
- Positions: Forward; left winger

Team information
- Current team: Südtirol (on loan from Venezia)
- Number: 90

Youth career
- Vicenza
- Udinese
- 2020–2022: Pordenone
- 2022–2024: Venezia

Senior career*
Years	Team	Apps	(Gls)
2022	Pordenone	2	(0)
2024–	Venezia	0	(0)
2024–2025	→ Vis Pesaro (loan)	30	(4)
2025–2026	→ Juventus Next Gen (loan)	17	(2)
2026	→ Juve Stabia (loan)	15	(1)
2026–	→ Südtirol (loan)	10	(1)

International career^{‡}
2025	Italy U20	6	(0)
2026–	Italy U21	1	(0)
- * Club domestic league appearances and goals as of 7 November 2026 ‡ National team caps and goals as of 8 June 2026

Alvin Obinna Okoro (born 26 March 2005) is an Italian professional footballer who plays as a forward or left winger for Serie B club Südtirol, on loan from Venezia.

== Club career ==
=== Pordenone ===
After coming through the youth ranks of Pordenone, Okoro made his professional debut for the club on 18 April 2022, coming in as a substitute for Leonardo Candellone at the 62nd minute of the Serie B game against Benevento: at 17 years and 23 days, he became the youngest player to feature in a league match during the 2021-22 season.

=== Venezia ===
On 1 September 2022, Okoro officially joined Venezia on a permanent deal.

==== Loan to Vis Pesaro ====
On 10 August 2024, Okoro joined Serie C club Vis Pesaro on a season-long loan.

==== Loan to Juventus Next Gen ====
On 16 August 2025, Okoro was loaned to Juventus Next Gen, with an option to buy.

==== Loan to Juve Stabia ====
On 2 February 2026, Okoro moved on a new loan to Juve Stabia in Serie B.

==== Loan to Südtirol ====
On 29 August 2026, Okoro joined Serie B side Südtirol on a season-long loan.

== International career ==
Okoro is eligible to represent his birth nation and Nigeria internationally, he represented Italy at the 2025 FIFA U-20 World Cup.

== Personal life ==
Born in Vicenza, Italy, Okoro is of Nigerian descent.
