= Civitella del Tronto =

- Comune
- Comune di Civitella del Tronto
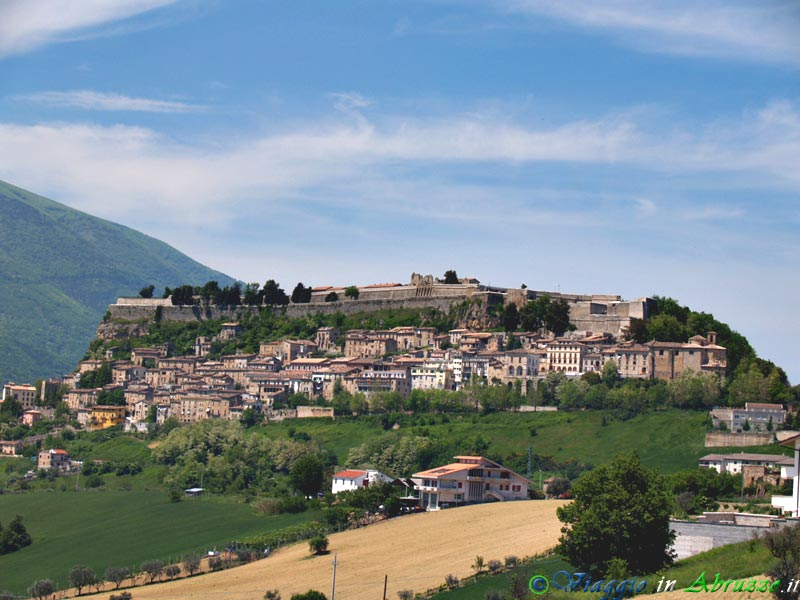
- View of the Civitella old town.

- Location within Italy Location within Abruzzo
- Coordinates: 42°46′N 13°40′E
- Country: Italy
- Region: Abruzzo
- Province: Teramo (TE)
- Frazioni: Borrano, Carosi, Cerqueto del Tronto, Collebigliano, Collevirtù, Cornacchiano, Favale, Fucignano, Gabbiano, Le Casette, Lucignano, Mucciano, Pagliericcio, Palazzese, Piano Risteccio, Piano San Pietro, Ponzano, Ripe, Rocche, Santa Croce, Sant'Andrea, Santa Maria, Santa Reparata, Sant'Eurosia, Tavolaccio, Valle Sant'Angelo, Villa Chierico, Villa Lempa, Villa Notari, Villa Passo, Villa Selva

Government
  - Mayor: Cristina Di Pietro

Area
  - Total: 77 km^{2} (30 sq mi)
- Elevation: 589 m (1,932 ft)

Population (31 August 2015)
  - Total: 5,130
  - Density: 67/km^{2} (170/sq mi)
- Demonym: Civitellesi
- Time zone: UTC+1 (CET)
  - Summer (DST): UTC+2 (CEST)
- Postal code: 64010
- Dialing code: 0861
- Patron saint: St. Ubald
- Saint day: 16 May
- Website: Official website

Civitella del Tronto (Italian pronunciation: [tʃiviˈtɛlla del ˈtronto]) is a town and comune (municipality) in the province of Teramo, within the Abruzzo region of central–southern Italy. It is in the Gran Sasso e Monti della Laga National Park. It is one of I Borghi più belli d'Italia ("The most beautiful villages of Italy").

== History ==
The origins of Civitella are unknown, though in the area have been found traces of human presence as early as the Neolithic and Upper Palaeolithic ages. The current town is believed to lie on the former Beregra, a town of the Piceni Italic tribe. It is first mentioned in the 10th to 11th centuries, as a walled town; in the 13th century it was part of the Kingdom of Naples, having a special importance as it was on the boundaries with the Papal States.

In 1557 it was besieged by French troops, but in vain. Thanks to its fierce resistance, it was given the title of Fidelissima ("Very Faithful") by King Philip II of Spain (at the time southern Italy was under Spanish control). Civitella was besieged again by the French during the Napoleonic Wars, in 1798 and 1806, this time being captured after four months of defence. In 1816, after the Congress of Vienna, it was annexed to the Kingdom of the Two Sicilies.

The fortress of Civitella was the location of the last stand of that Kingdom after the Garibaldine and Piedmontese invasion of 1860, after the King Francis II had already surrendered in Gaeta, Naples and Sicily being annexed to the newly formed Kingdom of Italy. Civitella surrendered on 20 March 1861.

== Main sights ==
The Fortress of Civitella is the largest in Italy, the second in Europe after the Hohensalzburg in Salzburg, Austria. It is located on the top of a rocky cliff, being about 500 metres (1,600 ft) long and 45 metres (148 ft) wide, for a total surface of 25,000 square metres (270,000 ft^{2}).

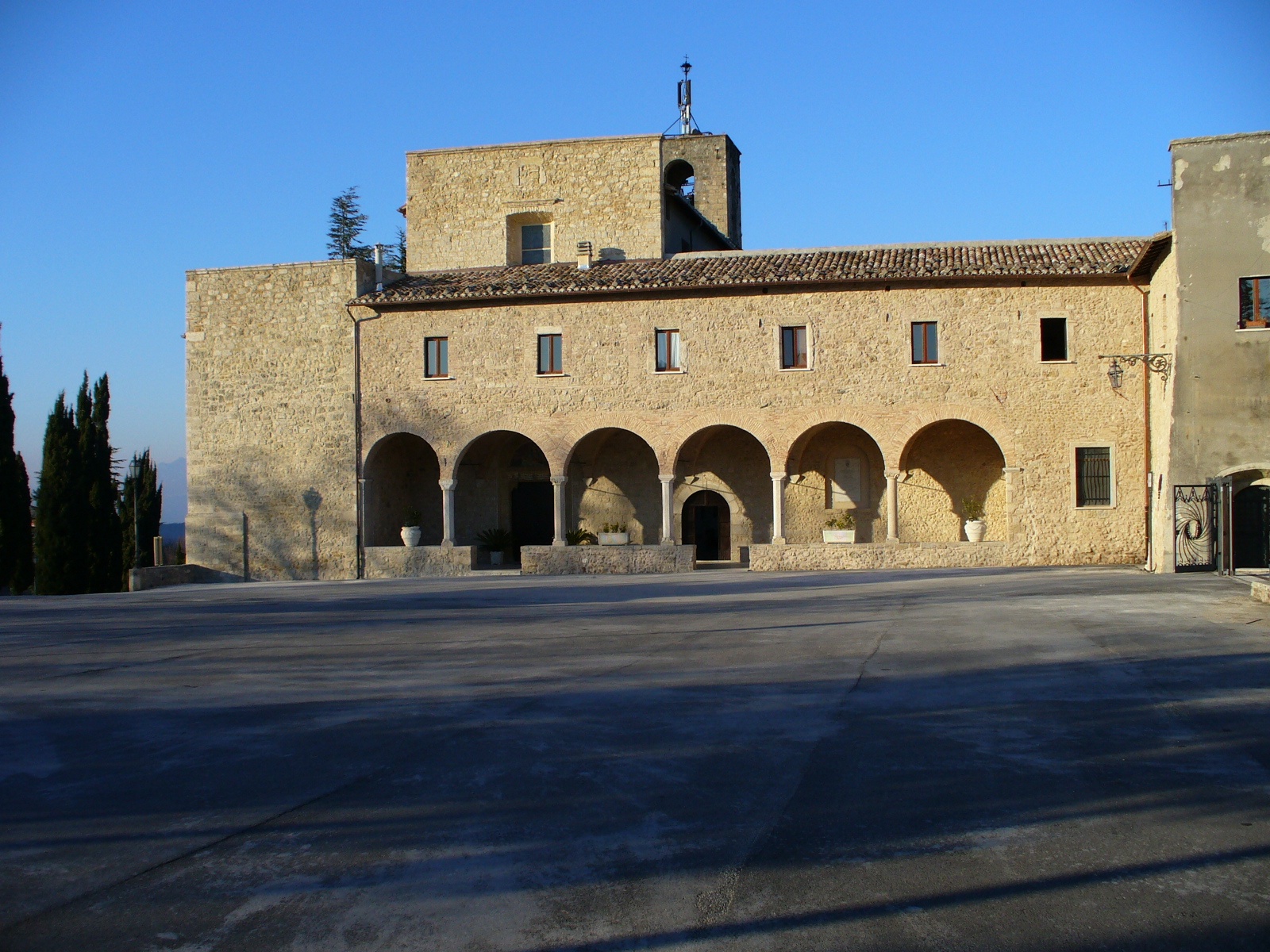
Sanctuary of Santa Maria dei Lumi.

The town has the following churches:

- San Francesco: built in 1326 in Gothic-Romanesque style, while the interior is Baroque
- San Lorenzo: rebuilt in the 18th century in Baroque style, but maintaining the Renaissance façade.
- Santa Maria degli Angeli (15th-16th centuries)
- Sanctuary and Convent of Santa Maria dei Lumi: (1466) It includes a Romanesque portico and a polychrome wooden statue of the Madonna dei Lumi, dating to 1489.
- Abbey of Santa Maria in Montesanto: Founded, according to the legend, by St. Benedict of Nursia himself in 542, in the 12th century it was one of the most powerful abbeys in the region; it started to decay from the late 15th century.

The surrounding mountains have karst topography in the landscapes of the Montagna dei Fiori.

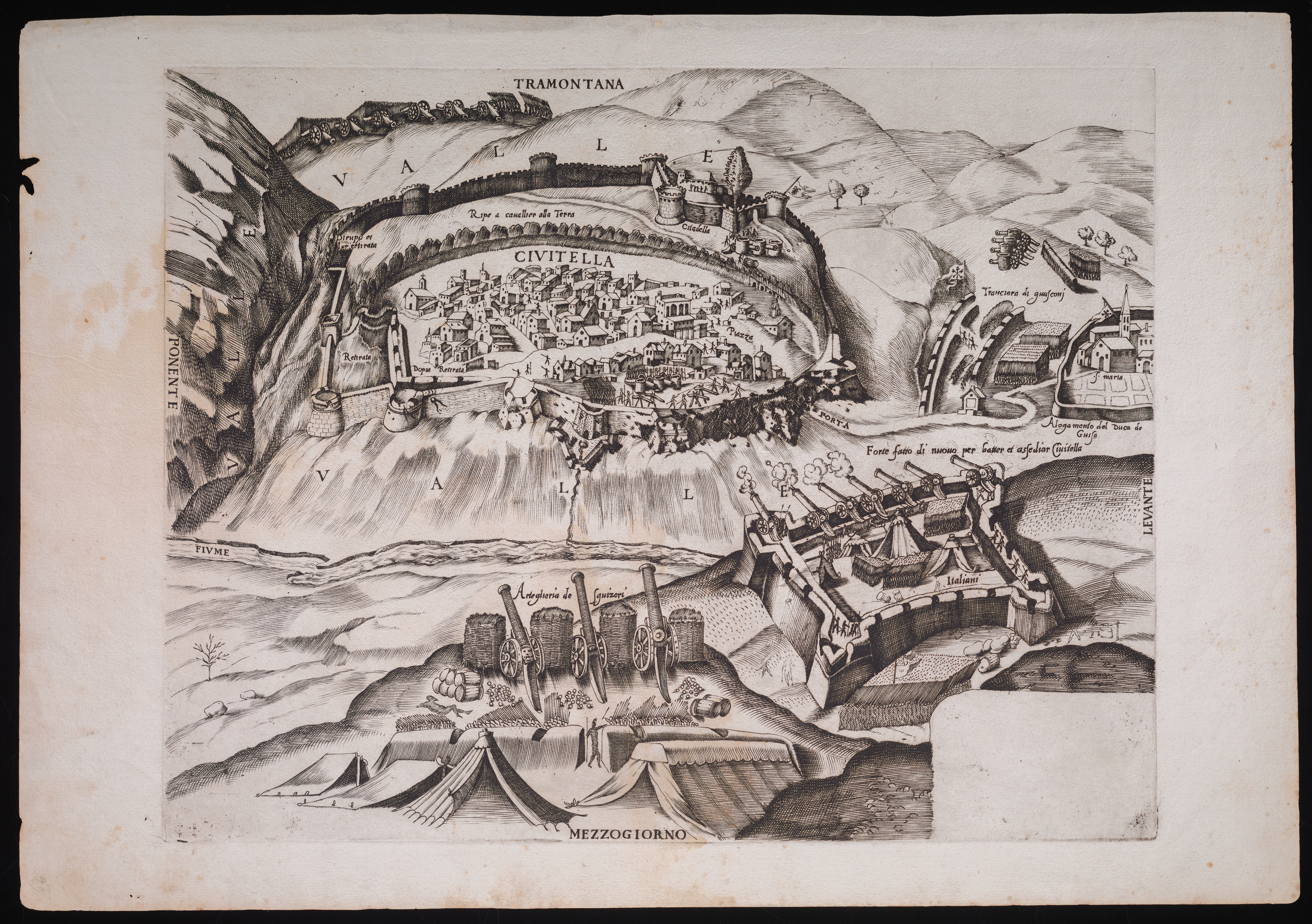
Plan of the siege of Civitella del Tronto

== Twin towns ==
- Salzburg, Austria, since 1989
- Ascoli Piceno, Italy, since 2015

== See also ==
- Matteo Wade, the Irish commander of the Civitella fortress in the 1806 siege.
