= Andrea Gaveglia =

Italian footballer (born 1984)

Personal information
- Date of birth: 12 April 1984 (age 42)
- Place of birth: Naples, Italy
- Height: 1.79 m (5 ft 10 1/2 in)
- Position: Defender

Senior career*
Years	Team	Apps	(Gls)
2002–2003	Napoli	1	(0)
2003–2008	Messina	26	(0)
2003–2004	→ Viterbese (loan)	0	(0)
2004–2006	→ Giugliano (loan)	42	(2)
2006–2007	→ Martina (loan)	16	(0)
2008–2009	Avellino	4	(0)
2009–2010	Vico Equense	3	(0)
2010	Colligiana	17	(1)
2011	Andria	0	(0)
2011–2012	Ebolitana	20	(1)
2013	Anziolavinio	4	(0)
2013	Torrecuso	5	(0)
- * Club domestic league appearances and goals

Andrea Gaveglia (born 12 April 1984) is an Italian footballer who played in Serie B for Napoli, Martina and Avellino.

== Biography ==
Gaveglia was a youth product of S.S.C. Napoli. In January 2003 he was sold to Messina in co-ownership deal along with Pietro De Giorgio for a total fee of €26,000. In June 2008 he became a free agent after Messina was relegated to Serie D. Gaveglia and teammate Antonio Ghomsi were signed by U.S. Avellino on free transfer.

After the bankruptcy of Colligiana Gaveglia without a club for 6 months. In January 2011 he joined Andria.
