= Alessio Cacciamani =

Italian footballer (born 2007)

Personal information
- Date of birth: 29 June 2007 (age 19)
- Place of birth: Jesi, Italy
- Height: 1.75 m (5 ft 9 in)
- Positions: Wing back; winger

Team information
- Current team: Torino
- Number: 77

Youth career
- Biagio Nazzaro
- –2022: Fano
- 2022–2023: Ancona
- 2023–2024: Torino

Senior career*
Years	Team	Apps	(Gls)
2024–	Torino	11	(0)
2025–2026	→ Juve Stabia (loan)	36	(2)

International career^{‡}
2025	Italy U18	3	(0)
2025	Italy U19	10	(1)
2026–	Italy U21	3	(0)
- * Club domestic league appearances and goals as of 27 October 2026 ‡ National team caps and goals as of 16 November 2026

Alessio Cacciamani (born 29 June 2007) is an Italian professional footballer who plays as a winger for Serie A club Torino.

== Club career ==
Born in Jesi, in the Marche region, Cacciamani went trough the youth setups of several clubs in his home region, before joining the Torino academy in 2023.

Cacciamani made his professional debut for Torino on 11 May 2025, coming on for Valentino Lazaro in the last 10 minutes of a 2–0 home Serie A loss to Inter Milan.

He signed his first professional contract with the club on the summer 2025.

He was loaned to SS Juve Stabia in Serie B for the 2025–26 season.

== International career ==
Cacciamani is a youth international for Italy, first playing with the Italy U18 in February 2025.

He received his first call-up to the U21 team in March 2026, making his debut on 26 March 2026 in a Euro 2027 qualifying match won 4–0 against North Macedonia.

In May 2026, he was one of the players who were called up with the Italy national senior squad by interim head coach Silvio Baldini, for the friendly matches against Luxembourg and Greece on 3 and 7 June 2026, respectively.
