= Fabio Maistro =

Italian footballer (born 1998)

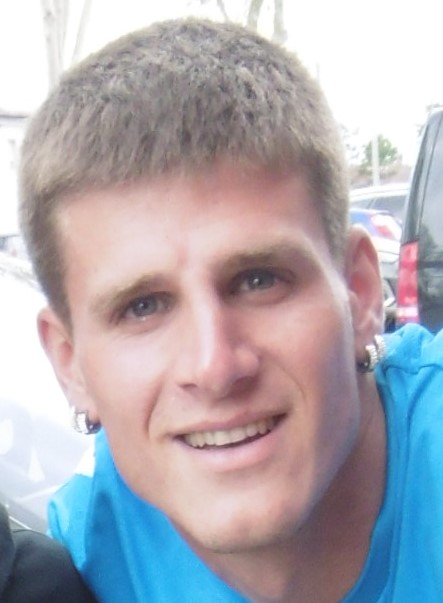
- Maistro in 2023

Personal information
- Date of birth: 5 April 1998 (age 28)
- Place of birth: Rovigo, Italy
- Height: 1.80 m (5 ft 11 in)
- Position: Midfielder

Team information
- Current team: Juve Stabia
- Number: 37

Youth career
- –2017: Fiorentina

Senior career*
Years	Team	Apps	(Gls)
2016–2017	Fiorentina	0	(0)
2018	Gavorrano	9	(0)
2018–2019	Rieti	7	(1)
2019–2022	Lazio	0	(0)
2019–2020	→ Salernitana (loan)	33	(2)
2020–2021	→ Pescara (loan)	29	(4)
2021–2022	→ Ascoli (loan)	31	(3)
2022–2024	SPAL	62	(8)
2024–	Juve Stabia	52	(4)

International career^{‡}
2019	Italy U21	2	(0)
- * Club domestic league appearances and goals as of 23 August 2026 ‡ National team caps and goals as of 19 November 2019

Fabio Maistro (born 5 April 1998) is an Italian footballer who plays as a midfielder for Serie B club Juve Stabia.

== Club career ==
=== Fiorentina ===
Maistro is a product of the Fiorentina youth system, and featured for their Under-19 squad during the 2015–16 and 2016–17 seasons. During the 2016–17 Serie A season, he also appeared on the bench for the senior squad numerous times, but never saw the pitch. He was released by Fiorentina at the end of the season.

=== Gavorrano ===
On 25 January 2018, Maistro joined Serie C club Gavorrano as a free-agent; three days later, he made his professional debut as a substitute, replacing Giulio Favale in the 63rd minute of a 1–1 away draw against Robur Siena. On 25 February, he played his first entire match for Gavorrano, a 1–0 away defeat against Arzachena.

=== Rieti ===
On 20 July 2018, he signed with another Serie C club, Rieti.

=== Lazio ===
==== Loan to Salernitana ====
On 3 August 2019, he signed with Lazio and was immediately loaned to Salernitana for a season.

==== Loan to Pescara ====
On 14 September 2020 he joined Pescara on loan.

==== Loan to Ascoli ====
On 31 August 2021, he was loaned to Ascoli.

=== SPAL ===
On 19 July 2022, Maistro signed a three-year contract with SPAL.

=== Juve Stabia ===
On 7 August 2024, Maistro moved to Juve Stabia on a two-season deal.

== International career ==
Maistro made his debut with the Italy U21 side on 16 November 2019, coming on as a late substitute for Patrick Cutrone in a 3–0 home win against Iceland in a Euro 2021 qualifying match.

== Career statistics ==
=== Club ===
As of 16 June 2018

Club	Season	League			Cup		Europe		Other		Total	
Club	Season	League	Apps	Goals	Apps	Goals	Apps	Goals	Apps	Goals	Apps	Goals
Gavorrano	2017–18	Serie C	9	0	0	0	—		—		9	0
Career total			9	0	0	0	—		—		9	0
