= Casertana FC =

Italian football club

Casertana
- Full name: Casertana Football Club S.r.l.
- Nicknames: Falchetti (The Little Falcons); Rossoblù (The Red & Blue); Magica (The Magicians)
- Founded: 1908; 112 years ago (Robur Caserta); 1924; 96 years ago (Unione Sportiva Casertana); 1928; 92 years ago (Associazione Sportiva Caserta); 1993; 27 years ago (Casertana Football Club); 2005; 15 years ago (Associazione Sportiva Dilettantistica Rinascita Falchi Rossoblù)
- Ground: Stadio Alberto Pinto, Caserta
- Capacity: 12,000
- Owner: Giuseppe D'Agostino
- President: Giuseppe D'Agostino
- Manager: Vinicio Espinal
- League: Serie C Group C
- 2025–26: Serie C Group C, 5th of 20
- Website: www.casertanafc.it
Home colours	Away colours

Casertana Football Club is an Italian association football club based in Caserta, Campania. The club currently plays in Serie C.

== History ==
The club was founded in 1908 as Robur Caserta and became known as Unione Sportiva Casertana from 1928 until 2005 when the club was excluded due to financial issues. The club also had two stints in Serie B in 1970–71 and 1991–92.

The club was refounded in 2005 as A.S. Caserta Calcio and was later renamed A.S. Casertana Calcio. During the 2009–10 Serie D season, the side returned to its traditional denomination.

Casertana returned to professionalism at the end of the 2012–13 season after finishing fourth in Serie D, thus reaching the promotion play-off only to be beaten by Virtus Verona in the final. However, the club was successively admitted into Lega Pro Seconda Divisione as a replacement for several teams that went bankrupt by the end of the season. The club ended the 2013–14 season in second place, thus qualifying to the 2014–15 Lega Pro division.

== Colours and badge ==
The colours of the team are red and blue.

== Players ==
=== Current squad ===
As of 1 September 2026. Note: Flags indicate national team as defined under FIFA eligibility rules; some limited exceptions apply. Players may hold more than one non-FIFA nationality.

No.	Pos.	Nation	Player
1	GK	ITA	Victor De Lucia
4	DF	CRO	Ivan Kontek
5	MF	ITA	Dino Mehić (on loan from Benevento)
7	FW	ITA	Enrico Piovanello (on loan from Juve Stabia)
8	MF	ITA	Stefano Girelli
9	FW	ITA	Davide Castelli
10	FW	ITA	Jacopo Manconi
14	FW	CIV	Junior Ajayi (on loan from Hellas Verona)
16	MF	ITA	Salvatore Pezzella
17	DF	ITA	Alessandro Caporale
18	DF	MAR	Shady Oukhadda
20	FW	ITA	Accursio Bentivegna

No.	Pos.	Nation	Player
21	MF	ARG	Franco Vezzoni
22	GK	ITA	Federico Magro (on loan from Hellas Verona)
23	DF	ITA	Pietro Martino
24	DF	ITA	Francesco Belli
27	MF	ITA	Mattia Sandri
33	DF	ITA	Gabriele Rocchi
99	FW	BEL	Gabriel Henin
—	DF	ITA	Giulio Favale
—	MF	ITA	Vincenzo Arzillo (on loan from Avellino)
—	MF	ITA	Francesco Di Tacchio (on loan from Catania)
—	FW	GAM	Muhammed Colley (on loan from Frosinone)

=== Out on loan ===
Note: Flags indicate national team as defined under FIFA eligibility rules; some limited exceptions apply. Players may hold more than one non-FIFA nationality.

No. / Pos. / Nation / Player; — / DF / ITA / Michele Tarantino (at Real Aversa until 30 June 2027)	No. / Pos. / Nation / Player; — / FW / ITA / Umberto Galletta (at Giugliano until 30 June 2027)

== Notable former managers ==
- (Italy) Giuseppe Materazzi
- (Italy) Nedo Sonetti
- (Italy) Adriano Lombardi

== Honours ==
Source: Casertanafc.it

- Serie C1
  - Champions (1): 1969–70, 1990–91
- Serie C2
  - Champions (1): 1980–81
- Serie D
  - Champions (3): 1949–50, 1962–63, 1995–96
  - Runners-up (2) : 1960–61, 1977–78
- Eccellenza Campania
  - Champions (1): 2006–07
- Promozione Campania
  - Champions (1): 1953–54
