= Enrico Piovanello =

Italian footballer (born 2000)

Personal information
- Date of birth: 20 April 2000 (age 26)
- Place of birth: Padua, Italy
- Height: 1.74 m (5 ft 9 in)
- Position: Forward

Team information
- Current team: Casertana (on loan from Juve Stabia)
- Number: 7

Senior career*
Years	Team	Apps	(Gls)
2017–2023	Padova	40	(1)
2018–2019	→ Bari (loan)	34	(3)
2020–2021	→ Catania (loan)	9	(0)
2021	→ Imolese (loan)	16	(2)
2021–2022	→ Mantova (loan)	30	(0)
2023–	Juve Stabia	25	(3)
2025	→ Trapani (loan)	16	(0)
2025–2026	→ Crotone (loan)	34	(4)
2026–	→ Casertana (loan)	0	(0)
- * Club domestic league appearances and goals as of 29 August 2026

Enrico Piovanello (born 20 April 2000) is an Italian professional footballer who plays as a striker for Serie C Group C club Casertana, on loan from Juve Stabia.

== Career ==
Piovanello made his debut in professional football in the 2017–18 season, helping Padova to be promoted to the 2018–19 Serie B. He also won the 2019 Supercoppa di Serie C. In the 2018–19 season, Piovanello moved to Bari which played in Serie D. He made 34 appearances and scored three goals. In the 2019–20 season, Piovanello returned to Padova and made nine appearances with no goals. In the 2020–21 season, Piovanello was loaned to Catania. He made his team debut on 26 October 2020, in a match against Teramo. In Catania he made nine appearances: 260 minutes and no goals. On 6 January 2021, Piovanello moved to Imolese on loan. Piovanello made with Imolese two goals in 18 appearances.

On 20 August 2021, he was loaned to Serie C club Mantova.

On 31 August 2023, Piovanello signed a two-year contract with Juve Stabia.

On 3 January 2025, he went to Serie C side Trapani on loan. On 8 August 2025, Piovanello was loaned to Crotone, with a conditional obligation to buy.

== Style of play ==
Piovanello has good technique and a strong dribbling ability.
