= 2019 Supercoppa di Serie C =

Football tournament season

Tournament details
- Country: Italy
- Dates: 11 May 2019 – 25 May 2019
- Teams: 3

Final positions
- Champions: Pordenone (1st title)

Tournament statistics
- Matches played: 3
- Goals scored: 7 (2.33 per match)

The 2019 Supercoppa di Serie C was the 20th edition of Supercoppa di Serie C.

Pordenone won their first title.

== Rules ==
The competition is made up of the three winning teams of their respective groups of the 2018–19 Serie C. All matches are one-legged.

- Matchday 1:The resting team and the home team are defined by drawing lots.
- Matchday 2:The resting team is the one that won matchday 1. If matchday 1 ends in a draw, the team that played matchday 1 away rests.
- Matchday 3: The two teams not faced in the previous two matchdays face off.

== Results ==
Pos	Team	Pld	W	D	L	GF	GA	GD	Pts	Qualification	POR	VIR	JUS
1	Pordenone	2	1	1	0	3	0	+3	4	Won the tournament	—		3–0
2	Virtus Entella	2	0	2	0	2	2	0	2		0–0	—	
3	Juve Stabia	2	0	1	1	2	5	−3	1			2–2	—

Rules for classification: Group stage tiebreakers

11 May 2019 1	Virtus Entella	0–0	Pordenone	Chiavari
20:30 CEST		Report		Stadium: Stadio Comunale

18 May 2019 2	Juve Stabia	2–2	Virtus Entella	Castellammare di Stabia
20:30 CEST	Paponi 73'; Elia 78'	Report	S. Icardi 47'; Iocolano 53'	Stadium: Stadio Romeo Menti

25 May 2019 3	Pordenone	3–0	Juve Stabia	Pordenone
18:00 CEST	Candellone 28'; De Agostini 47'; Schiavi 51' (o.g.)	Report		Stadium: Stadio Ottavio Bottecchia
