= Abbey of Santa Maria in Montesanto =

Abbey in Civitella del Tronto, Italy

Abbazia di Santa Maria in Montesanto
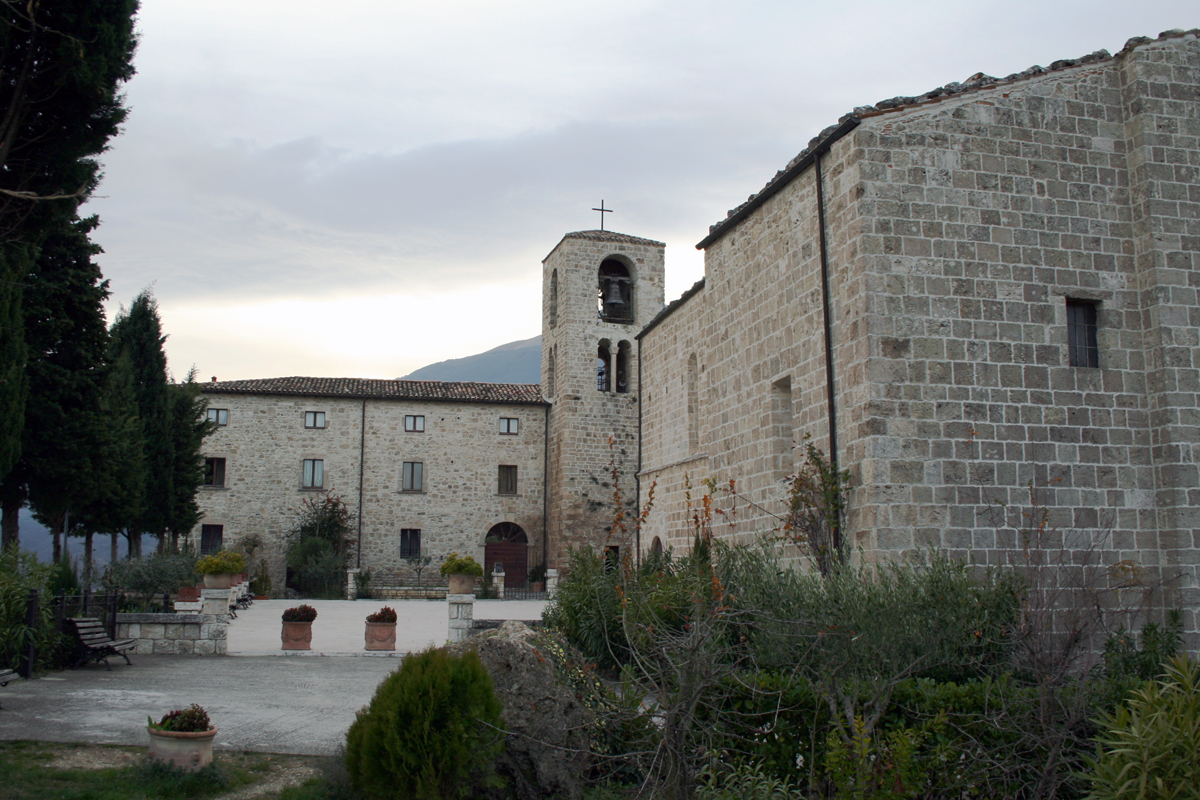
- Interactive map of Abbazia di Santa Maria in Montesanto

Monastery information
- Order: Benedictine
- Denomination: Roman Catholicism
- Established: c. 542
- Diocese: Roman Catholic Diocese of Teramo-Atri

Architecture
- Heritage designation: Italian national heritage
- Style: Romanesque

Site
- Location: Civitella del Tronto, Teramo, Abruzzo, Italy
- Coordinates: 42.7869°N 13.6538°E

The Abbey of Montesanto or Abbazia di Santa Maria in Montesanto is Romanesque-style Benedictine monastery located in the rural hills outside the town of Civitella del Tronto, in the province of Teramo, Abruzzo, Italy.

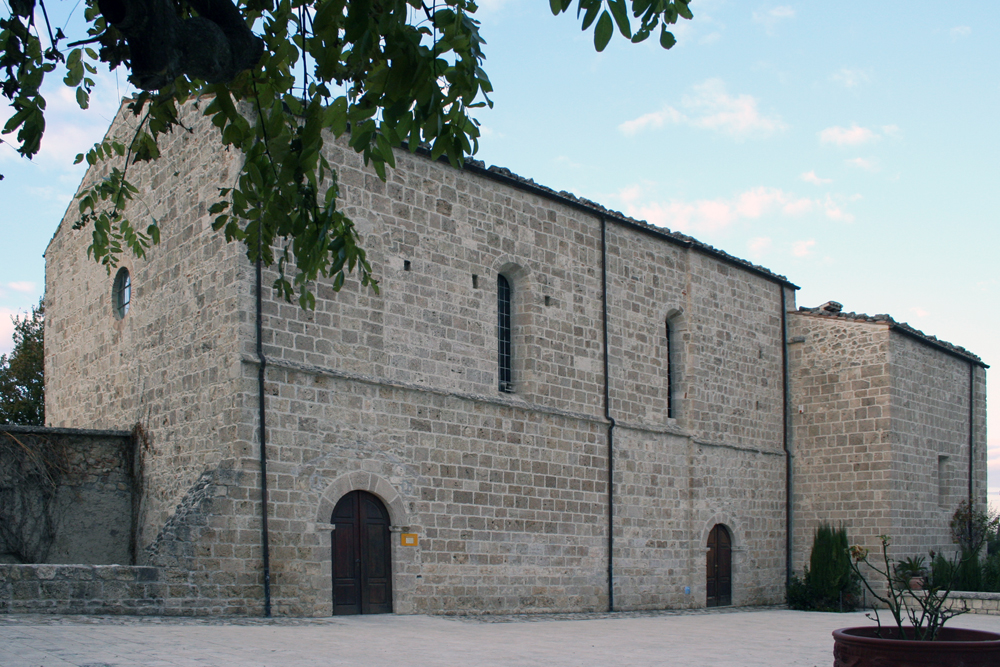
Abbey of Santa Maria in Montesanto

== History ==
This former Benedictine abbey and church was said to have been founded in 542 by St Benedict himself, on his return from Ascoli Piceno. The first documentation of its existence is from 1064. Located at the boundary of the Papal and Neapolitan states, the monastery once had been rich in land and church benefices, however by the 1400s, had fallen in importance and underwent definitive suppression in 1797.

The abbey church was originally a single nave, but a reconstruction in 13th century changed it to three naves. The Romanesque bell tower is separate from the church and located in the monastery.

== See also ==
- Catholic Church in Italy
