= Rareș Burnete =

Romanian footballer

Personal information
- Full name: Rareș Cătălin Burnete
- Date of birth: 31 January 2004 (age 22)
- Place of birth: Sighișoara, Romania
- Height: 1.85 m (6 ft 1 in)
- Position: Forward

Team information
- Current team: Südtirol (on loan from Lecce)
- Number: 9

Youth career
- –2020: Colțea Brașov
- 2018–2020: → Gheorghe Hagi Academy (loan)
- 2020–2024: Lecce

Senior career*
Years	Team	Apps	(Gls)
2023–	Lecce	5	(0)
2025–2026	→ Juve Stabia (loan)	25	(1)
2026–	→ Südtirol (loan)	11	(1)

International career^{‡}
2019	Romania U16	2	(0)
2021–2022	Romania U18	4	(0)
2021–2023	Romania U19	9	(2)
2023–2025	Romania U20	5	(1)
2023–2026	Romania U21	15	(2)
- * Club domestic league appearances and goals as of 7 November 2026 ‡ National team caps and goals as of 6 October 2026

Rareș Cătălin Burnete (born 31 January 2004) is a Romanian professional footballer who plays as a forward for Serie B club Südtirol on loan from Serie A club Lecce.

== Club career ==
Rareș Burnete grew up through Colțea Brașov youth academy, before joining the US Lecce in October 2020, along with fellow Romanian footballers Răzvan Pașcalău and Cătălin Vulturar.

Having started training with the Serie B first team on the summer 2021, Burnete made his professional debut for Lecce on 16 December 2021, entering as a substitute in a 0–2 away win over Spezia. He signed a 3 years contract extension the following spring, tying him to the club until 2025.

On 29 July 2025, Burnete was loaned by Juve Stabia in Serie B.

== International career ==
Burnete is a youth international for Romania, having featured for the under-18 national team.

== Career statistics ==
As of 7 November 2026

Appearances and goals by club, season and competition
Club	Season	League			Coppa Italia		Europe		Other		Total	
Club	Season	Division	Apps	Goals	Apps	Goals	Apps	Goals	Apps	Goals	Apps	Goals
Lecce	2021–22	Serie B	0	0	1	0	—		—		1	0
Lecce	2022–23	Serie A	0	0	0	0	—		—		0	0
Lecce	2023–24	Serie A	1	0	1	0	—		—		2	0
Lecce	2024–25	Serie A	4	0	1	0	—		—		5	0
Lecce	Total		5	0	3	0	—		—		8	0
Juve Stabia (loan)	2025–26	Serie B	25	1	1	0	—		2 (Note: Appearances in Serie B promotion play-offs)	1	28	2
Südtirol (loan)	2026–27	Serie B	11	1	2	0	—		—		13	1
Career total			41	2	6	0	—		2	1	49	3
