= Favale, Abruzzo =

Coordinates: 42°47′36″N 13°44′29″E

Favale
- Frazione
- Interactive map of Favale
- Country: Italy
- Region: Abruzzo
- Province: Teramo
- Time zone: UTC+1 (CET)
  - Summer (DST): UTC+2 (CEST)

Favale is a frazione in the commune of Civitella del Tronto (Province of Teramo) in the Abruzzo, region of Italy.
