= Patrick Ciurria =

Italian footballer (born 1995)

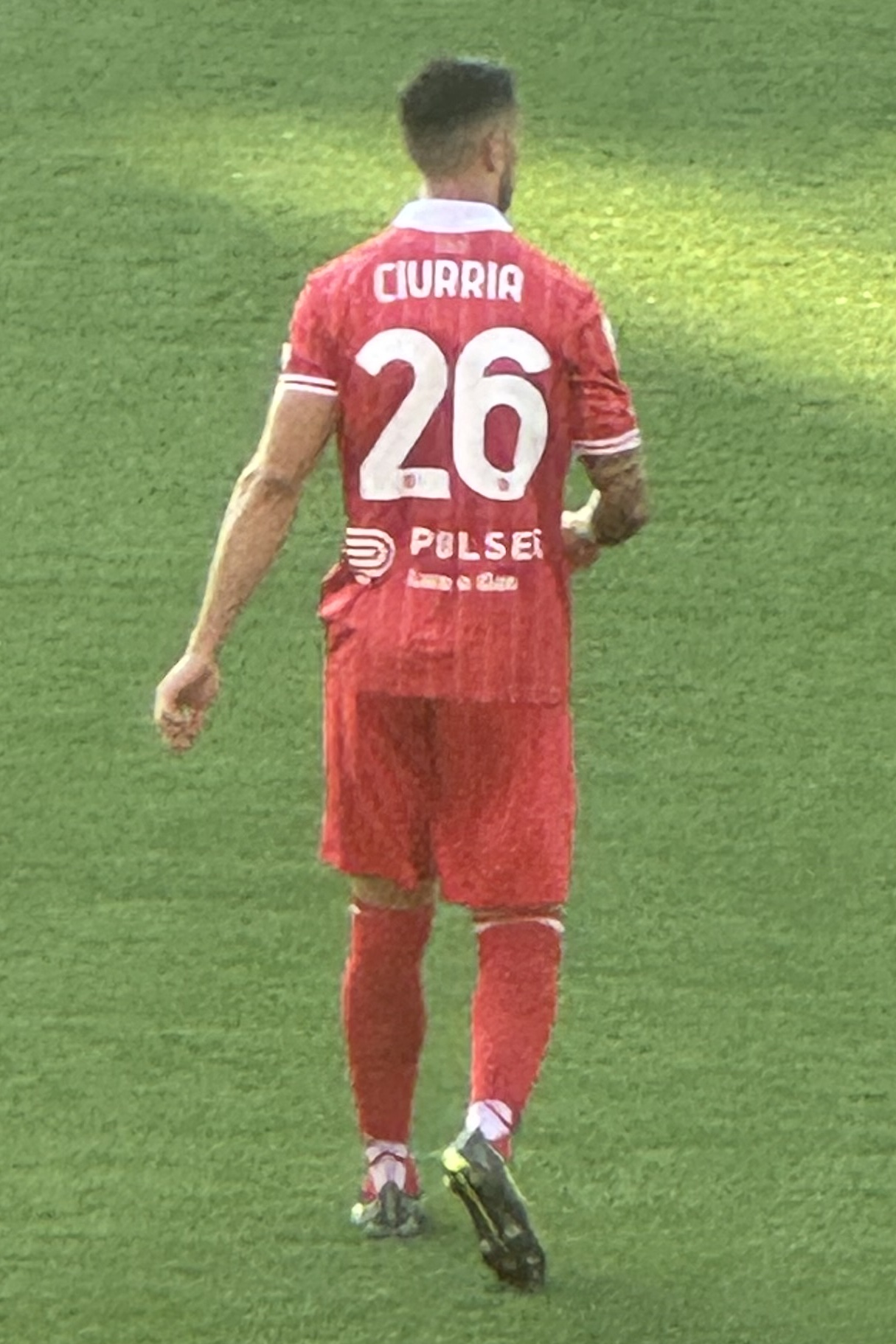
- Ciurria with Monza in 2025

Personal information
- Date of birth: 9 February 1995 (age 31)
- Place of birth: Sassuolo, Italy
- Height: 1.78 m (5 ft 10 in)
- Positions: Midfielder; full-back

Team information
- Current team: Monza
- Number: 26

Youth career
- 2011–2013: Castellarano
- 2013–2014: → Spezia (loan)

Senior career*
Years	Team	Apps	(Gls)
2013–2017	Spezia	24	(1)
2016–2017	→ Südtirol (loan)	19	(0)
2017	→ Robur Siena (loan)	15	(3)
2017–2021	Pordenone	137	(23)
2021–	Monza	145	(13)

International career
2013–2014	Italy U19	11	(3)
2014–2016	Italy U20	3	(0)
- * Club domestic league appearances and goals as of 12 May 2026

Patrick Ciurria (born 9 February 1995) is an Italian professional footballer who plays as a midfielder or full-back for Serie A club Monza.

== Club career ==
=== Spezia ===
From 2011 to January 2013, Ciurria played for Castellarano's youth system, before moving on loan to Spezia, with whom he played in the Campionato Primavera 1 in the second part of the 2012–13 season. At the end of the season he was bought outright by Spezia, making his first-team debut in the 2013–14 season; Ciurria made his Serie B debut for Spezia on 24 August 2013, in a 0–0 against Cittadella. He made five appearances in the Serie B and three appearances in the Coppa Italia.

Ciurria played two more seasons at Spezia, during the 2014–15 season (one league game and two cup games) and in the 2015–16 season, in which he played more frequently, scoring a goal in 18 appearances in the Serie B, and making three appearances in the Coppa Italia.

=== Loans to Südtirol and Siena ===
In summer 2016, Ciurria was loaned to Lega Pro club Südtirol. He made 19 appearances in the 2016–17 season, and a game in the Coppa Italia Lega Pro. In January 2017, Ciurria returned to Spezia, who then sent him on loan Siena; he scored three goals in 15 appearances in the Lega Pro.

=== Pordenone ===
In summer 2017, Ciurria was sold outright to Pordenone. In the 2017–18 season, he scored six goals in 29 appearances in the Serie C. Ciurria helped Pordenone with the league title in the 2018–19 season, marking the club's first promotion to the Serie B; he scored three goals in 37 games.

In the 2019–20 Serie B season, Ciurria scored five league goals in 35 appearances, and made one Coppa Italia appearance. The 2020–21 season was a prolific one for Ciurria, seeing him score nine goals and make 11 assists in 36 league games – he was the league top assist provider.

=== Monza ===
On 31 July 2021, Ciurria joined fellow Serie B side Monza on a three-year deal. He made his debut on 14 August, in a 2–1 Coppa Italia defeat to Cittadella in the first round. Ciurria helped Monza to their first Serie A promotion, after winning the promotion play-off final against Pisa.

Ciurria made his Serie A debut for Monza on 13 August 2022, as a substitute in a 2–1 home defeat to Torino. He first played as a starter on 18 September, assisting Christian Gytkjær in Monza's first-ever Serie A win, 1–0 at home against Italian giants Juventus. Ciurria helped Monza to an 11th-place finish in the league. On 10 August 2023, Monza renewed his contract until 30 June 2026.

== International career ==
Between 2013 and 2014, Ciurria scored four goals in 11 games for the Italy national under-19 team. He later also played three games with the under-20 team, with whom he participated in the Four Nations Tournament in 2014 and 2016.

== Style of play ==
Ciurria is a versatile forward who can be used as an attacking midfielder, right winger, striker or second striker.

== Personal life ==
Ciurria's nickname "il fante", meaning "the boy" in Spezzino dialect, was given to him during his time at Spezia.

== Career statistics ==
=== Club ===
As of match played 24 May 2025

Club	Season	League			Coppa Italia		Other		Total	
Club	Season	Division	Apps	Goals	Apps	Goals	Apps	Goals	Apps	Goals
Spezia	2013–14	Serie B	5	0	3	0	—		8	0
Spezia	2014–15	Serie B	1	0	2	0	—		3	0
Spezia	2015–16	Serie B	18	1	3	0	—		21	1
Spezia	2016–17	Serie B	—		—		—		0	0
Spezia	Total		24	1	8	0	0	0	32	1
Südtirol (loan)	2016–17	Lega Pro	19	0	0	0	1 (Note: Appearance in Coppa Italia Lega Pro)	0	20	0
Robur Siena (loan)	2016–17	Lega Pro	15	3	0	0	0	0	15	3
Pordenone	2017–18	Serie C	29	6	3	0	—		32	6
Pordenone	2018–19	Serie C	37	3	2	0	2 (Note: One appearance in Coppa Italia Serie C, one appearance in Supercoppa di Lega Pro)	0	41	3
Pordenone	2019–20	Serie B	35	5	1	0	2 (Note: Appearances in play-offs)	0	38	5
Pordenone	2020–21	Serie B	36	9	2	0	—		38	9
Pordenone	Total		137	23	8	0	4	0	149	23
Monza	2021–22	Serie B	38	5	1	0	4	0	39	5
Monza	2022–23	Serie A	36	6	1	0	—		37	6
Monza	2023–24	Serie A	22	0	1	0	—		23	0
Monza	2024–25	Serie A	21	1	1	0	—		22	1
Monza	Total		117	12	4	0	4	0	122	12
Career total			312	39	20	0	9	0	338	39

== Honours ==
Pordenone

- Serie C: 2018–19 (Group B)
- Supercoppa di Serie C: 2019

Individual

- Serie B top assist provider: 2020–21
