= San Lorenzo, Civitella del Tronto =

Church in Abruzzo, Italy

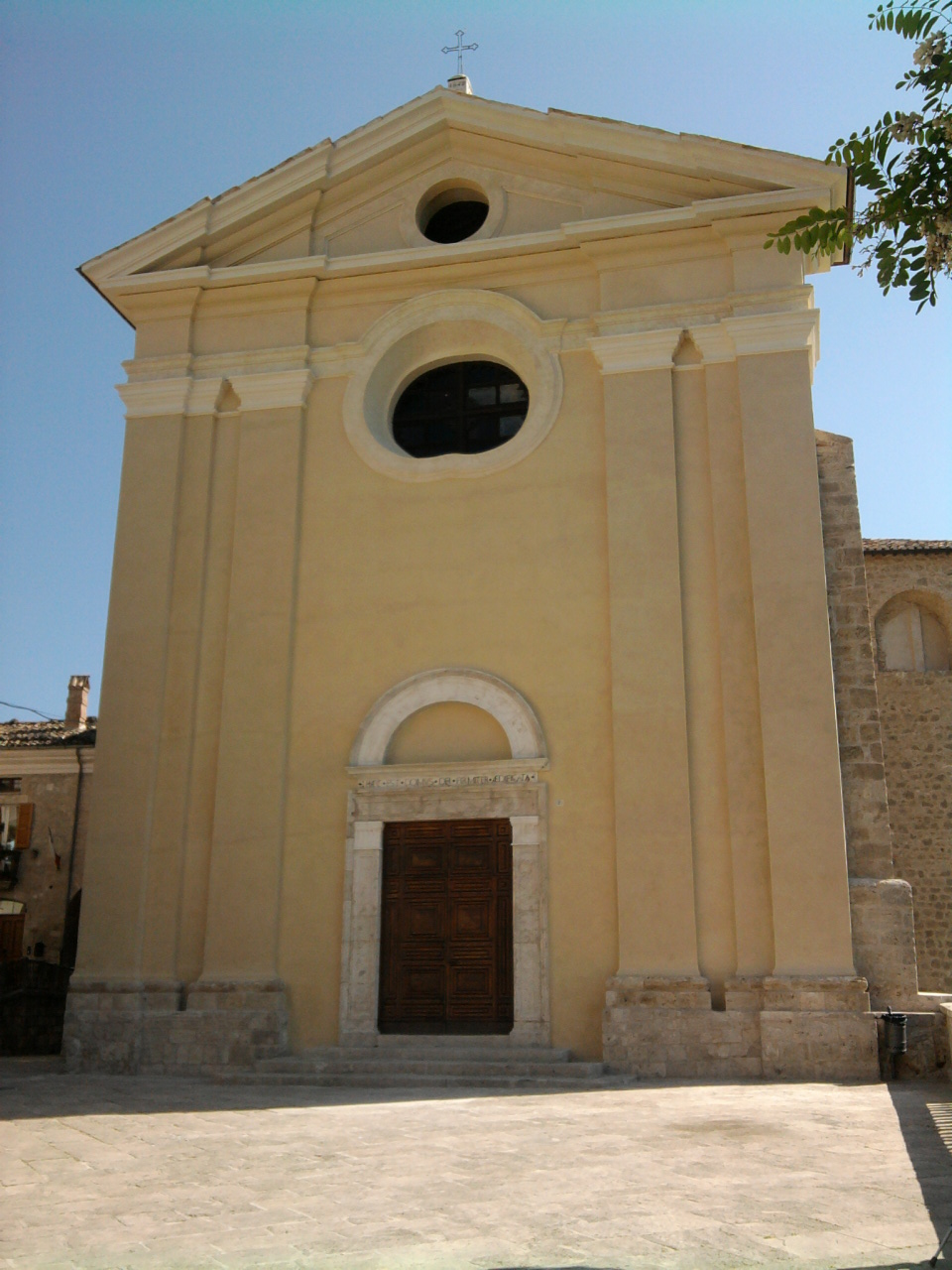
San Lorenzo, Civitella del Tronto.

San Lorenzo is a Renaissance-style Roman Catholic parish church located in the town of Civitella del Tronto, in the province of Teramo, Abruzzo, Italy.

== History ==
This church was dedicated to St Lawrence, and once stood outside of the town walls. During a siege in 1557, it served as a bastion of the defence. The façade has giant order pilasters with two central oculi: one above the rounded portal, and the other in the tympanum. In 1777, the interior was refurbished in a Baroque-style. The church has a single nave with two lateral chapels. The bell tower is inserted between the transept and apse. The Baroque altars demonstrate 18th-century stucco decoration. The organ was built in 1707. The Sacristy has a wooden icon of St Ubaldo upholding the city as its patron. The church has 16th-century canvases depicting respectively the Madonna del Rosary and a Visitation. There are also canvases depicting the Annunciation and a Deposition.
