= Pietro De Giorgio =

Italian professional footballer

Personal information
- Date of birth: 16 February 1983 (age 43)
- Place of birth: Praia a Mare, Italy
- Height: 1.72 m (5 ft 7 1/2 in)
- Position: Midfielder

Team information
- Current team: Juve Stabia (manager)

Youth career
- Mediterranea

Senior career*
Years	Team	Apps	(Gls)
2000–2001	Battipagliese	11	(0)
2001–2003	Napoli	0	(0)
2001–2002	→ San Marino (loan)	9	(0)
2002–2003	→ Cittadella (loan)	1	(0)
2003–2004	Messina	0	(0)
2003–2004	→ Melfi (loan)	31	(7)
2004–2006	Frosinone	31	(0)
2006	→ Giulianova (loan)	13	(1)
2006–2008	Cavese	58	(12)
2008–2009	Perugia	31	(2)
2009–2010	Empoli	19	(1)
2010–2017	Crotone	187	(13)
2017	→ Latina (loan)	17	(3)
2017–2018	Vicenza	37	(7)
2018–2020	Este	52	(12)

Managerial career
- 2023: Potenza (caretaker)
- 2023: Potenza (caretaker)
- 2024–2026: Potenza
- 2026–: Juve Stabia
- * Club domestic league appearances and goals

Pietro De Giorgio (born 16 February 1983) is an Italian football coach and a former player who is the head coach of Serie B club Juve Stabia.

== Playing career ==
Born in Praia a Mare, Calabria region, De Giorgio spent a season with Serie D club Battipagliese before he was signed by a professional club San Marino in 2001 in temporary deal from Napoli. In January 2002 he left the Serie C2 club for Serie B club Napoli, the parent company of San Marino Calcio at that time. In 2002–03 season he was signed by Serie C1 club Cittadella in temporary deal. In January 2003, he was signed by Serie B club Messina along with Andrea Gaveglia in co-ownership deals for a total fee of €26,000. In June 2003 the deals were renewed. De Giorgio also returned to Serie C2 for Melfi after only one appearance in the whole 2002–03 Serie C1. In June 2004, the co-ownership deals were extended again. However, Napoli went bankrupt at the start of the season. Thus, De Giorgio, who initially joined Serie C1 club Frosinone in a temporary deal, was converted into new co-ownership deal.

=== Frosinone ===
De Giorgio joined Serie C1 club Frosinone on 9 July 2004 (converted to a co-ownership deal in August), where he spent 1 1/2 seasons. The co-ownership deal with Messina was renewed in June 2005. De Giorgio only played six times in the first half of 2005–06 Serie C1. In the second half of the season, he was transferred to fellow third-division club Giulianova. Frosinone finished as the promotion playoffs winner of Group B while Giulianova finished as the 12th of Group A. In June 2006, Messina gave up the remaining 50% of De Giorgio's registration rights to the Serie B newcomer.

=== Cavese ===
On 6 July 2006, De Giorgio and Giuseppe Aquino left for Serie C1 club Cavese in co-ownership deals. De Giorgio spent 2 seasons with the Cava de' Tirreni based club. In June 2008 the club renewed the co-ownership again. However at the start of season he was sold to Perugia, with Frosinone retained 50% registration rights.

=== Perugia ===
De Giorgio joined Lega Pro Prima Divisione (ex–Serie C1) club Perugia Calcio in mid-2008. In June 2009, Frosinone gave up the remaining 50% of Perugia's registration rights after no agreement had been made before the deadline. However, Perugia decided to sell De Giorgio after acquiring the full contractual rights.

=== Empoli ===
De Giorgio was signed by Serie B club Empoli in August 2009. He made seven starts and 12 substitutes in 2009–10 Serie B.

=== Crotone ===
In July 2010 De Giorgio was signed by fellow second division club Crotone on a reported Bosman transfer. He made his 100th Serie B appearance on 28 March 2013.

== Coaching career ==
After short stints as a non-playing staff member of Luparense and Lamezia Terme, De Giorgio was appointed assistant coach of Serie C club Potenza in June 2022, being successively promoted to interim coach following the dismissal of Alberto Colombo on 10 October 2023; after guiding the team for a single league game, a 2–3 home loss to Turris, he was appointed as technical collaborator to new head coach Franco Lerda. He returned to serve as interim head coach on 7 December 2023 following the dismissal of Lerda, guiding Potenza to a 0–0 draw against Foggia. After guiding Potenza for a few more matches, he left his post on 28 December to make room for new manager Marco Marchionni and his coaching staff. On 13 April 2024, he was reinstated as head coach for the remainder of the season following Marchionni's dismissal.

On 3 July 2026, De Giorgio was hired by Juve Stabia in Serie B for two seasons.

== Honours ==
=== Manager ===
Potenza

- Coppa Italia Serie C: 2025–26
