= Stadio Romeo Menti (Castellammare di Stabia) =

Football stadium in Naples, Italy

Coordinates: 40°42′24″N 14°29′40″E

Stadio Comunale Romeo Menti
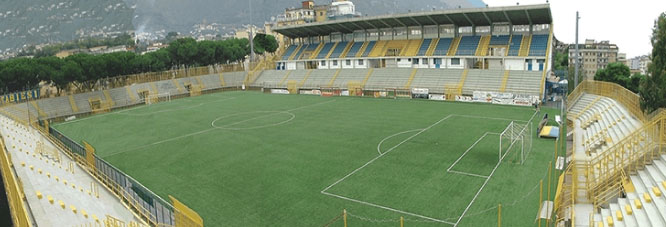
- Interactive map of Stadio Comunale Romeo Menti
- Location: Castellammare di Stabia, Italy
- Owner: Municipality of Castellammare di Stabia
- Capacity: 13,000 (7,642 approved)
- Surface: Artificial turf

Construction
- Opened: 1984

Tenant
- S.S. Juve Stabia

Stadio Comunale Romeo Menti is a football stadium in Castellammare di Stabia, Italy. It is currently the home ground of S.S. Juve Stabia. The stadium holds 12,800 and was opened in 1984.

It was named after a commemorative plague that was erected in 1949 on the request of Stabia fans after the Superga air disaster killed all of Grande Torino's members.
