= Marco Bellich =

Italian footballer (born 1999)

Personal information
- Date of birth: 5 May 1999 (age 27)
- Place of birth: Novara, Italy
- Height: 1.88 m (6 ft 2 in)
- Position: Centre-back

Team information
- Current team: Juve Stabia
- Number: 6

Youth career
- 2011–2019: Novara
- 2018–2019: → Genoa (loan)

Senior career*
Years	Team	Apps	(Gls)
2019–2021	Novara	21	(0)
2021–2022	Lucchese	32	(1)
2022–2023	Vicenza	25	(0)
2023–	Juve Stabia	101	(12)
- * Club domestic league appearances and goals as of 10 May 2026

Marco Bellich (born 5 May 1999) is an Italian professional footballer who plays as a centre-back for Serie B club Juve Stabia.

== Career ==
Born in Novara, Bellich started his career at hometown club Novara Calcio. He was promoted to the first team in 2017, and made his professional debut in Serie C, as a late substitute, on 16 March 2019 against Cuneo. He left the club in August 2021.

In August 2021, Bellich joined Lucchese.

On 21 July 2022, he signed a three-year contract with Vicenza.

On 25 August 2023, Bellich moved to Juve Stabia on a two-year contract.
