= Santa Maria dei Lumi, Civitella del Tronto =

Church in Civitella del Tronto, Italy

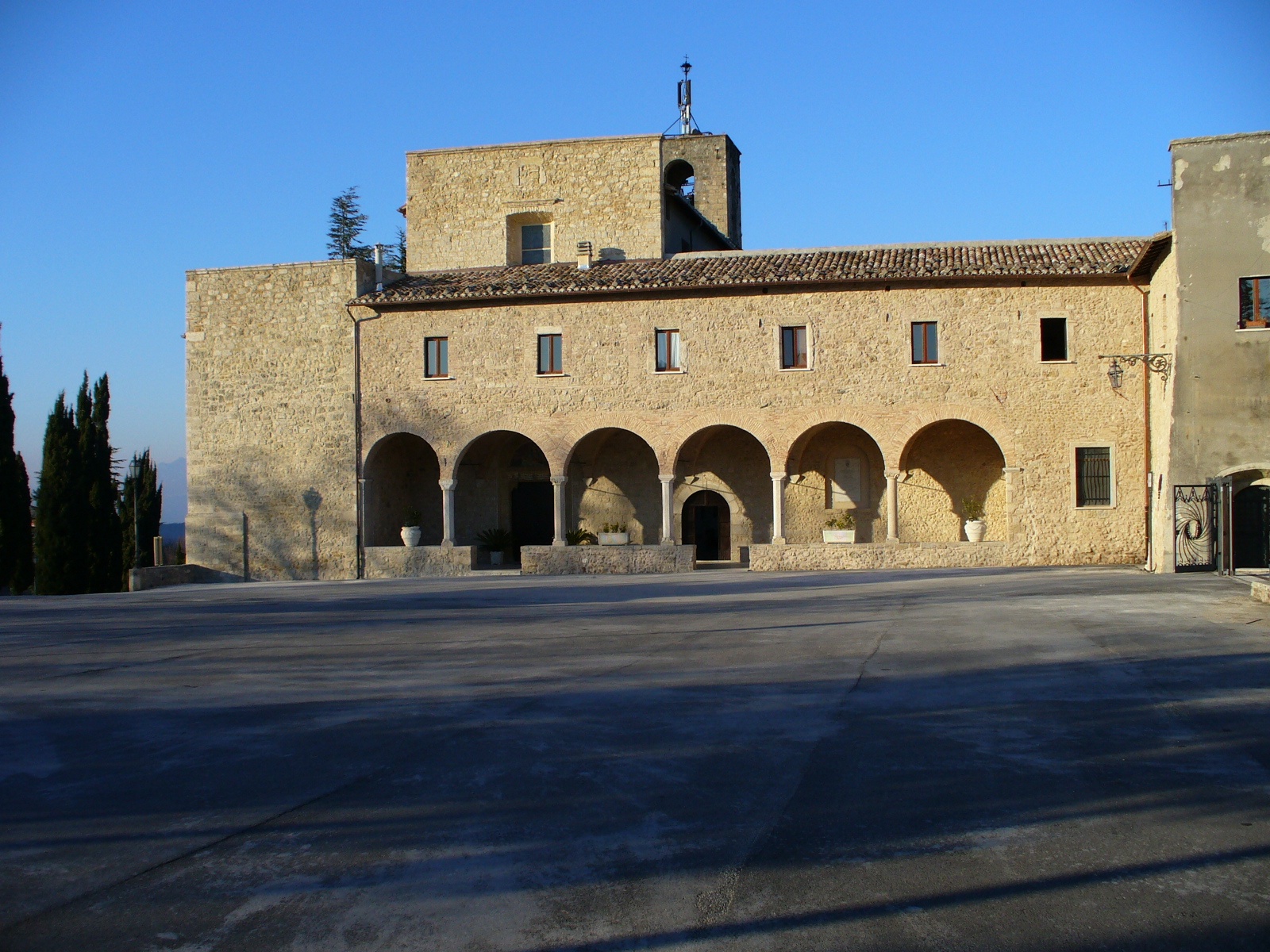
Santa Maria dei Lumi, Civitella del Tronto.

Santa Maria dei Lumi is a Romanesque-style, Roman Catholic sanctuary and convent located in the town of Civitella del Tronto, in the province of Teramo, Abruzzo, Italy.

== History ==
The church and convent were erected in 1466, atop a hill in the town. The foundation is attributed to San Giacomo della Marca. The church has a Romanesque portico with arches. The interior was refurbished in the 19th century, including a widening of the left nave. The main altar (1922) houses a wooden statue of the Madonna and Child (1489), called the Madonna dei Lummi, which was carved by Giovanni di Blusuccio.

In the presbytery and cupola of the church are frescoes by Pauri di Grottammare. Next to the church is the cloister of the adjacent monastery. The church suffered during the wars due to its proximity to the town fortress. It was heavily restored in 1960.
