= Abigail Favale =

American gender studies academic

- Spouse: Michael Favale
- Children: 4

Academic background
- Education: George Fox University (BA); University of St Andrews (MA, PhD)
- Thesis: Words incarnate: contemporary women's fiction as religious revision (2011)

Abigail Favale is an American academic.

She is a professor at the McGrath Institute for Church Life at the University of Notre Dame.

She has a BA in philosophy from George Fox University, an MA in Women, Writing and Gender, and PhD in English literature from the University of St Andrews.

Her book Irigaray, Incarnation and Contemporary Women's Fiction won the 2014 Feminist and Women's Studies Association Book Prize.

== Books ==
- The Genesis of Gender: A Christian Theory (2022)
- Into the Deep: An Unlikely Catholic Conversion (2018)
- Irigaray, Incarnation and Contemporary Women's Fiction (Bloomsbury 2013)
