= Demba Thiam =

Demba Thiam may refer to:

- Demba Thiam (footballer, born 1989), French football left-back for Dunkerque
- Demba Thiam (footballer, born 1998), Senegalese football goalkeeper for Monza
