= Tomi Petrović =

Croatian footballer (born 1999)

Personal information
- Date of birth: 11 March 1999 (age 27)
- Place of birth: Toulouse, France
- Height: 1.89 m (6 ft 2 in)
- Position: Forward

Team information
- Current team: Cosenza (on loan from Juve Stabia)
- Number: 17

Youth career
- –2007: Croatia Sesvete
- 2007–2008: Dinamo Zagreb
- 2008–2010: Croatia Sesvete
- 2010–2012: Sesvete
- 2012–2014: Dinamo Zagreb
- 2014–2015: Grazer AK

Senior career*
Years	Team	Apps	(Gls)
2015	Deutschlandsberger SC	2	(0)
2015–2017	Kapfenberger SV II	32	(9)
2015	Rapid Kapfenberg	12	(7)
2016–2017	Kapfenberger SV	28	(1)
2017–2022	Virtus Entella	24	(1)
2019–2020	→ Rimini (loan)	8	(0)
2020	→ Pro Vercelli (loan)	4	(1)
2021	→ Lucchese (loan)	21	(4)
2021–2022	→ Lecco (loan)	31	(1)
2022–2023	Pordenone	0	(0)
2022–2023	→ Pontedera (loan)	13	(1)
2023	→ Trento (loan)	16	(4)
2023–2025	Trento	60	(13)
2024	→ SPAL (loan)	14	(3)
2025–	Juve Stabia	0	(0)
2025–2026	→ Treviso (loan)	16	(1)
2026	→ Pergolettese (loan)	14	(1)
2026–	→ Cosenza (loan)	1	(0)
- * Club domestic league appearances and goals as of 22 August 2026

Tomi Petrović (born 11 March 1999) is a Croatian professional footballer who plays as a forward for Serie C Group C club Cosenza, on loan from Juve Stabia.

== Career ==
Petrović had spells in the Austrian lower leagues before moving to Italy.

On 29 July 2019, he joined Rimini on loan. On 15 January 2020, Petrović moved on a new loan to Pro Vercelli.

On 8 January 2021, he was loaned to Lucchese. On 19 July 2021, he joined Lecco on loan.

On 30 June 2022, Serie C club Pordenone announced the signing of a three-year contract with Petrović. On 22 July 2022, he was loaned by Pontedera. On 17 January 2023, Petrović moved on a new loan to Trento.

On 13 July 2023, he returned to Trento on a two-year contract. On 1 February 2024, Petrović was loaned by SPAL.

On 10 July 2025, Petrović signed a two-year contract with Juve Stabia. On 12 August 2025, he was loaned to Treviso in Serie D, with a conditional obligation to buy.

== Personal life ==
He is the son of retired footballer Vladimir Petrović.
