= Giuseppe Aquino (footballer, born 1979) =

German born Italian footballer

Personal information
- Date of birth: 25 September 1979 (age 47)
- Place of birth: Mainz, West Germany
- Height: 1.75 m (5 ft 9 in)
- Position: Forward

Senior career*
Years	Team	Apps	(Gls)
1997–1998	Ascoli	9	(0)
1998–1999	Tolentino	16	(8)
1999–2000	Imolese	22	(1)
2000–2001	Chieti	23	(10)
2001–2002	Ascoli	15	(1)
2002–2004	Chieti	43	(5)
2004–2005	Frosinone	43	(6)
2005–2009	Cavese	96	(29)
2009–2010	Potenza	13	(0)
2010–2011	Ancona	10	(4)
2011	Noto	4	(2)
2011–2012	Viterbese	6	(1)
Total		300	(67)
- * Club domestic league appearances and goals

Giuseppe Aquino (born 25 September 1979) is a German born Italian footballer.

== Career ==
Born in Mainz, West Germany, Aquino started his professional career at Marche club Ascoli. He moved to Serie D club (Italian top level of amateur football and the fifth division of the pyramid until 2014) Tolentino in October 1998. He was the player of Serie C2 club Imolese in 1999–2000 season. In October 2000 he joined fellow fourth division club Chieti. In 2001, he returned to Ascoli Piceno. In 2002, he returned to Chieti again in co-ownership deal. In January 2004 he joined Frosinone of Serie C1, with Ascoli retained 50% registration rights of Aquino. Frosinone acquired Aquino outright from Ascoli in June 2004.

In August 2005 he was signed by Serie C2 team Cavese in temporary deal. Frosinone promoted to Serie B in 2006 as well as Cavese to Serie C1.

On 6 July 2006 Aquino and Pietro De Giorgio were sold to Cavese in co-ownership deals, which Luigi Cipriani followed. In June 2008 Frosinone gave up the remain registration rights to Cavese.

In 2009, he left for fellow Lega Pro Prima Divisione (ex–Serie C1) club Potenza. The club was excluded from professional football due to match-fixing in 2010. In 2010, he joined reborn Ancona in Eccellenza Marche. In January 2011 he joined Serie D club Noto. He retired after played his last season with Serie D club Viterbese.

== Honours ==
- Serie C1: 2006 (Cavese)
- Coppa Italia Dilettanti: 2011 (Ancona)
- Eccellenza Marche: 2011 (Ancona)
