= Giuseppe Aquino (footballer, born 1983) =

Italian footballer

Personal information
- Date of birth: 11 July 1983 (age 43)
- Place of birth: Pompei, Italy
- Height: 1.85 m (6 ft 1 in)
- Position: Defender

Youth career
- Siena

Senior career*
Years	Team	Apps	(Gls)
2002–2006	Fortis Juventus	79	(2)
2006–2007	Pro Vasto	29	(1)
2007–2008	Monopoli	25	(0)
2008–2010	Sangiustese	44	(4)
2010	San Marino	13	(0)
2010–2011	Rimini	32	(4)
2011–2012	Aprilia	29	(2)
2012–2013	Sambenedettese	18	(1)
2013–	Maceratese	15	(0)
- * Club domestic league appearances and goals

Giuseppe Aquino (born 11 July 1983) is an Italian footballer.

== Biography ==
Born in Pompei, Campania, Aquino started his senior career at Tuscan club Fortis Juventus in Serie D (Italian top division of amateur football and fifth division of the pyramid until 2014). In 2006, he was signed by a Serie C2 club. In July 2007 he joined Monopoli. In 2008, he moved to another fourth division club Sangiustese; in January 2010 he was signed by San Marino Calcio. Since 2010 he returned to Serie D. (except 2011–12 with Lega Pro Seconda Divisione (ex–Serie C2) club Aprilia) He won promotion back to professional football in 2013 with Sambenedettese, however the club was not admitted.

== Honours ==
- Serie D: 2013 (Sambenedettese)
