= Leonardo Candellone =

Italian footballer (born 1997)

Personal information
- Date of birth: 15 September 1997 (age 29)
- Place of birth: Turin, Italy
- Height: 1.86 m (6 ft 1 in)
- Position: Centre-forward

Team information
- Current team: Juve Stabia
- Number: 27

Youth career
- Pertusa Biglieri
- 2011–2016: Torino

Senior career*
Years	Team	Apps	(Gls)
2016–2020	Torino	0	(0)
2016–2017	→ Gubbio (loan)	34	(6)
2017–2018	→ Ternana (loan)	3	(0)
2018	→ Südtirol (loan)	19	(5)
2018–2020	→ Pordenone (loan)	64	(11)
2020–2023	Napoli	0	(0)
2020–2021	→ Bari (loan)	28	(1)
2021–2022	→ Südtirol (loan)	15	(0)
2022–2023	→ Pordenone (loan)	35	(8)
2023–	Juve Stabia	91	(23)
- * Club domestic league appearances and goals as of 10 May 2026

Leonardo Candellone (born 15 September 1997) is an Italian professional footballer who plays as a forward for Serie B clubs Juve Stabia.

== Club career ==
=== Torino ===
Born in Turin, Candellone was a youth exponent of Torino.

==== Loan to Gubbio ====
On 15 July 2016, Candellone was signed by Serie C side Gubbio on a season-long loan deal. On 27 August, Candellone made his debut for Gubbio in a 1–1 away draw against Pordenone, he was replaced by Lorenzo Musto in the 70th minute. On 3 September he scored his first professional goal, as a substitute, in the 75th minute of a 1–0 home win over Südtirol. On 10 September he played his first entire match for Gubbio, a 1–0 away win over Lumezzane. On 26 November, Candellone scored his second in the 27th minute of a 3–0 away win over Mantova. On 4 December he scored his third goal in the 32nd minute of a 3–2 home defeat against Reggiana. On 30 April 2017, Candellone received a red card, as a substitute, in the 88th minute of a 3–0 away defeat against Bassano Virtus. Candellone ended his loan to Gubbio with 35 appearances, 6 goals and 2 assists.

==== Loan to Ternana and Südtirol ====
On 8 August 2017, Candellone was loaned to Serie B club Ternana on a season-long loan deal. On 21 October he made his Serie B debut as a substitute replacing Luca Tremolada in the 84th minute of a 1–1 home draw against Ascoli. On 24 October he played his second match for Ternana, again as a substitute replacing Alessandro Favalli in the 65th minute of a 4–2 away defeat against Frosinone. On 18 November, Candellone played his third match as a substitute replacing Adriano Montalto in the 76th minute of a 1–1 away draw against Foggia. In January 2018, Candellone was re-called to Torino leaving Ternana with only 3 appearances, all as a substitute.

On 11 January 2018, Candellone was signed by Serie C club Südtirol on a 6-month loan deal. On 20 January, Candellone made his Serie C debut for Südtirol as a substitute replacing Rocco Costantino in the 57th minute and he scored his first goal in the 63rd minute of a 1–0 away win over Fermana. On 10 February, Candellone played his first match as a starter for Südtirol, a 2–1 home defeat against Gubbio, he was replaced by Rocco Costantino in the 56th minute. On 29 April he scored twice in a 2–1 away win over Ravenna. Candellone ended his 6-month loan to Südtirol with 19 appearances, 5 goals and 2 assists.

==== Loan to Pordenone ====
On 31 July 2018, Candellone was loaned to Serie C club Pordenone on a season-long loan deal. On 5 August he made his debut for Pordenone in a match lost 4–3 at penalties after a 2–2 away draw against Pescara in second round of Coppa Italia. On 18 September he made his Serie C debut and he scored his first goal for Pordenone in the 34th minute of a 2–1 home win over Fano, he played the entire match. One week later, on 23 September, he scored his second goal in the 34th minute of a 2–1 away win over AlbinoLeffe. Three days later, Candellone scored his third consecutive goal and the decisive goal of the match in the 42nd minute of a 1–0 home win over Virtus Verona. Candellone ended his season-long loan to Pordenone with 39 appearances, including 38 of them as a starter, 16 goals and 3 assists.

On 24 July 2019, Candellone returned to Pordenone with another season-long loan. On 11 August 2019, Candellone played his first match of the season in a 2–1 home defeat against FeralpiSalò in the second round of Coppa Italia. he was replaced by Gaetano Monachello in the 62nd minute. On 1 September he made his league debut for Pordenone as a substitute replacing Patrick Ciurria in the 77th minute of a 4–2 away defeat against Pescara. On 13 September he played his first match as a starter in Serie B, a 1–0 home win over Spezia, he was replaced after 65 minutes by Patrick Ciurria. On 17 January 2020, Candellone scored his first goal in Serie B in the 29th minute of a 2–2 away draw against Frosinone. Candellone ended his second season at the club with 34 appearances, 2 goals and 3 assist.

=== Napoli ===
On 19 September 2020, his rights were purchased by Napoli.

==== Loan to Bari ====
On the same day Napoli immediately sent him to Bari on a two-year loan with an option to purchase. Four days later, on 23 September, he made his debut for the club as a substitute replacing Manuel Marras in the 46th minute and in the 75th minute he scored his first goal for the club in a 4–0 home win over Travestere in the first round of Coppa Italia. Four days later, he made his league debut for the club as a substitute replacing again Manuel Marras in the 66th minute of a 3–2 away win over Virtus Francavilla. On 7 October, Candellone played his first match as a starter for the club in Serie C, a 3–2 away win over Cavese, he was replaced by Eugenio D'Ursi after 66 minutes. Five weeks later, on 11 November, he played his first entire match for Bari, a 4–1 away win over Potenza. Candellone ended his first season to Bari with 28 appearances, 9 of them as a starter, 1 goal and 2 assists. However in July 2021 his loan was interrupped and he returned to Napoli.

==== Loan to Südtirol ====
On 16 July 2021, he returned to Südtirol on loan.

==== Return to Pordenone ====
On 31 January 2022, Candellone returned to Pordenone on a new loan until 30 June 2023, with an option to buy.

=== Juve Stabia ===
On 19 July 2023, Candellone joined Serie C club Juve Stabia on a contract till 30 June 2025.

== Career statistics ==
=== Club ===
As of 18 July 2021

Club	Season	League			Cup		Europe		Other		Total	
Club	Season	League	Apps	Goals	Apps	Goals	Apps	Goals	Apps	Goals	Apps	Goals
Gubbio (loan)	2016–17	Serie C	34	6	0	0	—		1 (Note: All appearance(s) in Serie C play-off.)	0	35	6
Ternana (loan)	2017–18	Serie B	3	0	0	0	—		—		3	0
Südtirol (loan)	2017–18	Serie C	15	4	—		—		4	1	19	5
Pordenone (loan)	2018–19	Serie C	37	15	1	0	—		2 (Note: All appearance(s) in Supercoppa di Serie C.)	1	40	16
Pordenone (loan)	2019–20	Serie B	31	2	1	0	—		2 (Note: All appearance(s) in Serie B play-off.)	0	36	2
Bari (loan)	2020–21	Serie C	26	0	2	1	—		—		28	1
Career total			146	27	4	1	—		9	2	159	30

== Honours ==
=== Club ===
Torino Primavera

- Campionato Nazionale Primavera: 2014–15
- Supercoppa Primavera: 2016

Pordenone

- Serie C (Group B): 2018–19
- Supercoppa di Serie C: 2019
