= Giulio Favale =

Italian football player

Personal information
- Date of birth: 25 January 1998 (age 28)
- Place of birth: Pisa, Italy
- Height: 1.79 m (5 ft 10 in)
- Position: Midfielder

Team information
- Current team: Casertana

Youth career
- Pisa

Senior career*
Years	Team	Apps	(Gls)
2016–2019	Pisa	4	(0)
2018	→ Gavorrano (loan)	14	(0)
2018–2019	→ Lucchese (loan)	38	(0)
2019–2021	Reggiana	18	(0)
2020	→ Pistoiese (loan)	6	(0)
2020–2021	→ Cesena (loan)	35	(1)
2021–2022	Cesena	29	(0)
2022–2023	Virtus Entella	28	(3)
2023–2026	Padova	79	(3)
2026–	Casertana	0	(0)
- * Club domestic league appearances and goals as of 29 August 2026

Giulio Favale (born 25 January 1998) is an Italian footballer who plays as a midfielder for Serie C Group C club Casertana.

== Club career ==
He made his professional debut in the Serie B for Pisa on 24 December 2016 in a game against Spezia.

On 26 July 2019, he signed a 3-year contract with Reggiana.

On 20 January 2020, he was loaned to Pistoiese.

On 17 September 2020, he was loaned to Cesena. On 31 August 2021, his contract with Reggiana was terminated by mutual consent.

On 26 September 2021, he returned to Cesena on a one-season deal.

On 29 June 2022, Favale signed with Virtus Entella.

On 1 September 2023, Favale joined Padova on a two-year deal.
