= SS Juve Stabia =

Italian football club

Juve Stabia
- Full name: Società Sportiva Juve Stabia
- Nicknames: Le Vespe (The Wasps); I Gialloblù (The Yellow and Blues); Gli Stabiesi (The Stabians)
- Founded: 1907 (119 years ago); 2002 (24 years ago) (refounded)
- Stadium: Stadio Romeo Menti
- Capacity: 7,642
- Owner: Domus Srl
- President: Alfredo Guerri
- Head coach: Pietro De Giorgio
- League: Serie B
- 2025–26: Serie B, 7th of 20
- Website: ssjuvestabia.it
Home colours	Away colours	Third colours

Società Sportiva Juve Stabia is a professional football club based in Castellammare di Stabia, Campania, Italy. The team plays in Serie B, the second tier of Italian football, following promotion from Serie C in the 2023–24 season.

== History ==
=== From Stabia SC (1907–1930) to FC Stabiese (1930–1933) ===
Football in Castellammare di Stabia originated in 1907 with the foundation of Stabia Sporting Club by the brothers Romano and Pauzano Weiss. The club joined the Campania regional branch of the Italian Football Federation (FIGC) in 1914 and began competing officially in Terza Categoria championships. Following World War I, the club was re-established in 1919 under the leadership of lawyer Vincenzo Bonifacio. In 1920, a merger with Sport Club War, another local club founded the previous year, secured promotion to the 1919–20 Promozione championship.

Stabia later joined the Confederazione Calcistica Italiana (CCI) and competed in the 1921–22 Prima Divisione, the highest level of Italian football at the time. Financial difficulties led to relegation to the Seconda Divisione in 1924, although the club immediately returned to the top tier the following season. After another relegation in 1925–26, it remained in the second division until 1929. Facing severe financial problems, the club voluntarily dropped down a division in 1930 and changed its name to Football Club Stabiese. The club eventually went bankrupt in 1933.

=== The AC Stabia era (1933–1953) ===
Re-founded as Associazione Calcio Stabia, the club was required to restart as a newly affiliated side and therefore began again from the Terza Divisione. In 1945, it won the Campania championship after a closely contested title race with Salernitana. During this period, the team featured renowned forward Romeo Menti, after whom the city's stadium is named.

On 17 June 1951, Stabia achieved promotion to Serie B by defeating Foggia 2–0 in a promotion play-off held in Florence, with both goals scored by Cereseto. The club finished bottom of the table in the 1951–52 Serie B season and was relegated after a campaign that included matches against prominent clubs such as Genoa and Roma, the latter winning the championship. Following another relegation at the end of the 1952–53 Serie C season, the club collapsed due to financial difficulties and did not register for the 1953–54 IV Serie championship.

=== From SS Juventus Stabia (1953–1996) to AC Juve Stabia (1996–2001) ===
After the bankruptcy of Stabia, a smaller local club, Società Sportiva Juventus Stabia, founded in 1935 by Salvatore Russo and affiliated with the federation in 1945, became the city's leading football team. To mark this transition, the club changed its colours from black and white stripes to yellow and blue stripes. Yellow and blue had also been the colours of the previous Stabia club and correspond to those of the city's coat of arms.

In 1953, Juventus Stabia competed in the Promozione Campania, then the fifth tier of Italian football. The club earned promotion to Serie C in 1971 but was relegated two years later, returning to Serie D. Between then and 1993, it alternated between Serie D and Serie C2 before securing promotion to the third tier, by then renamed Serie C1.

In 1994, Juve Stabia came close to reaching Serie B but lost the promotion play-off final to Salernitana in a regional derby.

The club changed its legal name to Associazione Calcio Juve Stabia in 1996. In 1999, it narrowly missed promotion to Serie B once again after losing to Savoia. Relegation followed the next season, and the club ultimately went bankrupt in 2001.

=== From Comprensorio Stabia (2002–2003) to S.S. Juve Stabia (2003–present) ===
Following the collapse of AC Juve Stabia in 2001, Castellammare di Stabia experienced a season without a major representative football club, although Libertas Stabia continued to compete in the lower divisions.

In 2002, a new sporting title was registered in the Terza Categoria and merged with that of Comprensorio Nola, creating Comprensorio Stabia. This arrangement allowed the newly formed club to enter Serie D. In 2003–04, the club adopted the name Società Sportiva Juve Stabia, won promotion to Serie C2, and also lifted the Coppa Italia Serie D. Between 2004 and 2011, the club alternated between the third and fourth tiers of Italian football. During this period, it also participated in a three-team playoff for the Supercoppa di Lega Pro Seconda Divisione, but failed to win the trophy. In 2011, Juve Stabia secured promotion to Serie B by defeating Atletico Roma in the promotion play-off final.

Managed by Piero Braglia and aided by Marco Sau's 21 league goals in the 2011–12 season, Juve Stabia achieved what was then the best result in its history, finishing ninth in Serie B. The club remained in the second tier for three consecutive seasons before being relegated in 2014 following a 3–0 defeat to Trapani.

In the 2014–15 season, Juve Stabia finished fourth with 70 points and qualified for the promotion play-offs but were eliminated in the first round after losing 5–4 on penalties to Bassano. The following season, the team finished tenth with 42 points, avoiding the relegation play-outs. In 2016–17, the club again finished fourth in Lega Pro, later being eliminated from the play-offs by Reggiana. The same occurred in 2017–18, the first season of the restructured Serie C. After defeating Virtus Francavilla in the second round of the play-offs, Juve Stabia was eliminated in the round of 16 by Reggiana on away-seeding rules following draws of 0–0 at home and 1–1 away.

The 2018–19 Serie C season proved highly successful. A 2–1 home victory against Vibonese secured promotion to Serie B with two matches remaining, after the club had led the table from the opening rounds of the championship.

The following season in Serie B, the team enjoyed a solid campaign until the suspension caused by the COVID-19 pandemic. However, after collecting only five points from the final ten matches following the restart, Juve Stabia fell to second-bottom place and was relegated back to Serie C.

After three seasons in the third tier and two consecutive appearances in the promotion play-offs, the club won Group C of Serie C in 2023–24, securing promotion to Serie B with three matches to spare. The season ended with a club-record 79 points and an unbeaten home record.

In the 2024–25 Serie B season, Juve Stabia recorded the best campaign in its history. Never seriously involved in the relegation battle, the club instead remained in the upper reaches of the table throughout the season. Highlights included two victories over Bari, a win against Sampdoria at the Stadio Luigi Ferraris, and two derby victories over Salernitana. Juve Stabia finished the regular season in fifth place and qualified for the Serie A promotion play-offs. In the preliminary round, Palermo was defeated 1–0 thanks to a goal from Adorante. The first leg of the semi-final was played before a capacity crowd at the Stadio Romeo Menti, where Juve Stabia claimed a historic 2–1 victory over Cremonese, although the result was overturned in the return leg.

== Recent seasons ==
Season	Division	Tier	Pos	Pl	W	D	L	+	-	P	Cup	Note
2016–17	Lega Pro (Group C)	III	4	38	18	10	10	65	43	64	2nd round	Eliminated in the promotion play-offs 1/8-finals to Reggiana
2017–18	Serie C (Group C)	III	4	36	14	13	9	49	35	55	2nd round	Eliminated in the promotion play-offs 1/8-finals to Reggiana
2018–19	Serie C (Group C)	III	↑ 1	36	22	12	2	63	18	77	2nd round	Promoted to Serie B
2019–20	Serie B	II	↓ 19	38	11	8	19	47	63	41	2nd round	Relegated to Serie C
2020–21	Serie C (Group C)	III	5	36	18	7	11	51	39	61	2nd round	Eliminated in the promotion play-offs 1/16-finals to Palermo
2021–22	Serie C (Group C)	III	11	36	13	12	11	44	36	49	–	
2022–23	Serie C (Group C)	III	10	38	12	10	16	37	49	46	–	Eliminated in the promotion play-offs 1/32-finals to Audace Cerignola
2023–24	Serie C (Group C)	III	↑ 1	38	22	13	3	57	24	79	–	Promoted to Serie B
2024–25	Serie B	II	5	38	14	13	11	42	41	55	Prelim. round	Eliminated in the promotion play-offs semifinals to Cremonese
2025–26	Serie B	II	7	38	11	18	9	44	45	51	1st round	Eliminated in the promotion play-offs semifinals to Monza

== Players ==
=== Current squad ===
As of 10 September 2026

Note: Flags indicate national team as defined under FIFA eligibility rules; some limited exceptions apply. Players may hold more than one non-FIFA nationality.

No.	Pos.	Nation	Player
1	GK	CRO	Ante Vuković (on loan from Pisa)
2	DF	ITA	Manuel Ricciardi
4	DF	ITA	Matteo Baldi
5	MF	ITA	Thomas Battistella
6	DF	ITA	Marco Bellich
7	FW	ITA	Nicola Patanè
8	MF	ITA	Davide Buglio
9	FW	ITA	Antonio Di Nardo
10	MF	ITA	Christian Pierobon
11	FW	ITA	Kevin Piscopo
16	GK	ITA	Alessandro Signorini
17	MF	SWE	Nermin Karić
18	MF	ITA	Daniel Perin
19	DF	ITA	Nicola Pietrangeli
20	FW	ITA	Luigi Caccavo (on loan from Bologna)
23	GK	ITA	Pietro Boer

No.	Pos.	Nation	Player
24	MF	ITA	Justin Kumi (on loan from Sassuolo)
25	DF	NED	Terrence Douglas
27	FW	ITA	Leonardo Candellone (captain)
30	FW	ITA	Romeo Sandrucci (on loan from Torino)
33	MF	ITA	Giuseppe Sibilli
37	MF	ITA	Fabio Maistro
73	DF	ITA	Giulio Scuderi (on loan from Fiorentina)
77	FW	GBS	Saná Fernandes (on loan from Lazio)
80	MF	ITA	Federico Artioli
82	FW	ITA	Edoardo Lonardo
87	DF	ITA	Davide Bettella
92	DF	MLI	Francesco Gallea (on loan from Cagliari)
95	GK	ITA	Paolo Vismara
96	DF	ITA	Tommaso Maggioni
-	FW	ITA	Alessio Sorace

=== Out on loan ===
Note: Flags indicate national team as defined under FIFA eligibility rules; some limited exceptions apply. Players may hold more than one non-FIFA nationality.

No.	Pos.	Nation	Player
—	FW	BRA	Matheus dos Santos (at Potenza until 30 June 2027)
—	FW	ITA	Gregorio Morachioli (at Livorno until 30 June 2027)

No.	Pos.	Nation	Player
—	FW	CRO	Tomi Petrović (at Cosenza until 30 June 2027)
—	FW	ITA	Enrico Piovanello (at Casertana until 30 June 2027)

== Coaching staff ==
Position	Name
Head coach	(Italy) Pietro De Giorgio
Assistant coach	(Italy) Cesare Beggi
Goalkeeper coach	(Italy) Amedeo Petrazzuolo
Fitness coach	(Italy) Raffaele La Penna (Italy) Alessandro Micheli
Technical coach	(Italy) Davide Farina (Italy) Francesco Di Capua (Italy) Carlo Acanfora
Match analyst	(Italy) Dario Cucinotta
Head of medical	(Italy) Giuseppe Aucello
Club doctor	(Italy) Ciro Nastro (Italy) Mario Aurino (Italy) Gaetano Nastro

== Honours ==
- Campionato Italia Liberata
  - Winners: 1945
- Serie C
  - Champions: 1950–51, 2018-2019
- Lega Pro Prima Divisione
  - Promoted: 2010–11 (After Play-Offs)
- Lega Pro Seconda Divisione
  - Champions: 1992–93 (Serie C2), 2009–10
- Serie D
  - Promoted: 1971–72, 1978–79, 1990–91, 2003–04
- Coppa Italia Lega Pro
  - Winners: 2010–11
- Coppa Italia Serie D
  - Winners: 2003–04
