= 2025–26 SSC Bari season =

Italian football club season 2025-26

SSC Bari
2025–26 season
- Manager: Fabio Caserta (until 26 November); Vincenzo Vivarini (from 27 November until 19 January); Moreno Longo (from 19 January)
- Stadium: Stadio San Nicola
- Serie B: 17th
- Coppa Italia: First round
- Top goalscorer: League: Gabriele Moncini (10); All: Gabriele Moncini (10)
- Average home league attendance: 10,268
- Biggest win: Bari 4–1 Reggiana (14 March 2026)
- Biggest defeat: Empoli 5–0 Bari (29 November 2025)
- All statistics correct as of 5 May 2026.

The 2025–26 season is the 118th in the history of Società Sportiva Calcio Bari and the club’s fourth consecutive season in Serie B of the Italian football leagues. In addition to participating in the domestic league, the team also competed in the Coppa Italia.

The team's kit for the season was designed by Italian sporting goods manufacturer Erreà and featured the Swedish online gaming company Betsson as the main kit sponsor.

== Squad ==
=== Transfers In ===
Pos.	Player	Transferred from	Fee	Date	Source
FW	(Belgium) Hemsley Akpa-Chukwu	(Italy) Novara	Loan return	30 June 2025	
MF	(Morocco) Ismail Achik	(Italy) Audace Cerignola	Loan return	30 June 2025	
MF	(Italy) Francesco Lops	(Italy) Sorrento	Loan return	30 June 2025	
MF	(Croatia) Karlo Lulić	(Bosnia and Herzegovina) FK Sarajevo	Loan return	30 June 2025	
MF	(Italy) Filippo Faggi	(Italy) Gubbio	Loan return	30 June 2025	
FW	(Italy) Giacomo Manzari	(Italy) Carrarese	Loan return	30 June 2025	
DF	(Italy) Sheriff Kassama	(Italy) Trento	Loan	14 July 2025	
FW	(Italy) Anthony Partipilo	(Italy) Parma	Loan	8 August 2025	
FW	(Italy) Mirko Antonucci	(Italy) Spezia	Loan	21 August 2025	
MF	(Italy) Gaetano Castrovilli	(Italy) Lazio	Undisclosed	21 August 2025	
FW	(Italy) Leonardo Cerri	(Italy) Juventus Next Gen	Loan	27 August 2025	
DF	(Italy) Andrea Meroni	(Italy) Reggiana	Undisclosed	1 September 2025	
DF	(Italy) Riccardo Burgio	(Italy) Potenza	Undisclosed	1 September 2025	
MF	(The Gambia) Ebrima Darboe	(Italy) Roma	Undisclosed	1 September 2025	
MF	(Italy) Giulio Maggiore	(Italy) Salernitana	Free	1 September 2025	
DF	(Italy) Andrea Cistana	(Italy) Spezia Calcio	Loan	4 January 2026	
FW	(Italy) Giacomo De Pieri	(Italy) Inter Milan	Loan	9 January 2026	
DF	(Italy) Giacomo Stabile	(Italy) Inter Milan	Loan	9 January 2026	
DF	(Portugal) Tomás Esteves	(Italy) Pisa	Loan	25 January 2026	
FW	(Albania) Marvin Çuni	(Russia) Rubin Kazan	Loan	26 January 2026	
MF	(Italy) Nicolò Cavuoti	(Italy) Cagliari	Loan	28 January 2026	
MF	(Italy) Kevin Piscopo	(Italy) Juve Stabia	Loan	31 January 2026	
DF	(Italy) Valerio Mantovani	(Italy) Mantova	Undisclosed	2 February 2026	
DF	(Netherlands) Cas Odenthal	(Italy) Sassuolo	Loan	2 February 2026	
MF	(Italy) Federico Artioli	(Italy) Mantova	Loan	2 February 2026	
MF	(France) Daouda Traoré	(England) Southampton	Loan	2 February 2026	

=== Transfers Out ===
Pos.	Player	Transferred to	Fee	Date	Source
GK	(Serbia) Boris Radunović	(Italy) Cagliari	Loan return	30 June 2025	
DF	(Croatia) Lorenco Šimić	(Israel) Maccabi Haifa	Loan return	30 June 2025	
MF	(Uruguay) César Falletti	(Italy) Cremonese	Loan return	30 June 2025	
MF	(Italy) Andrea Oliveri	(Italy) Atalanta U23	Loan return	30 June 2025	
MF	(Italy) Giulio Maggiore	(Italy) Salernitana	Loan return	30 June 2025	
MF	(Morocco) Ismail Achik	(Italy) Salernitana	€100,000	11 July 2025	
MF	(Libya) Ahmad Benali	(Italy) Virtus Entella	Undisclosed	1 August 2025	
MF	(Croatia) Karlo Lulić	(Italy) Casarano Calcio	Undisclosed	8 August 2025	
FW	(France) Aurélien Scheidler	(Belgium) FCV Dender EH	€800,000	21 August 2025	
MF	(Italy) Francesco Lops	(Italy) Giugliano	Loan	23 August 2025	
FW	(Italy) Giacomo Manzari	(Italy) Perugia	Loan	28 August 2025	
MF	(Italy) Filippo Faggi	(Italy) Pontedera	Loan	1 September 2025	
DF	(Italy) Alessandro Tripaldelli	(Italy) Reggiana	Loan	1 September 2025	
FW	(Belgium) Hemsley Akpa-Chukwu	(Belgium) RFC Seraing	Free	8 September 2025	
MF	(Uruguay) Gastón Pereiro		Released	20 January 2026	
DF	(Kosovo) Indrit Mavraj	(Poland) Lechia Gdańsk	Free	26 January 2026	
DF	(Italy) Francesco Vicari	(Italy) Reggiana	Loan	26 January 2026	
FW	(Italy) Leonardo Cerri	(Italy) Juventus Next Gen	Loan return	29 January 2026	
DF	(Italy) Sheriff Kassama	(Italy) Trento	Loan return	30 January 2026	
MF	(Italy) Gaetano Castrovilli	(Italy) Cesena	Undisclosed	2 February 2026	
DF	(Italy) Andrea Meroni	(Italy) Mantova	Loan	2 February 2026	
MF	(Italy) Vincenzo Colangiuli	(Italy) Lumezzane	Loan	2 February 2026	
MF	(Italy) Mirko Antonucci	(Italy) Spezia	Loan return	2 February 2026	

== Friendlies ==
26 July 2025	Bari	1–0	Campobasso

4 August 2025	Bari	2–3	Casarano

9 August 2025	Bari	3–0	Picerno

== Competitions ==
=== Overall record ===
Competition	First match	Last match	Starting round	Final position	Record							
Competition	First match	Last match	Starting round	Final position	Pld	W	D	L	GF	GA	GD	Win %
Serie B	24 August 2025	8–10 May 2026	Matchday 1		4	0	1	3	2	8	−6	0.00
Coppa Italia	17 August 2025		First round	First round	1	0	0	1	0	2	−2	0.00
Total					5	0	1	4	2	10	−8	0.00

Last updated: 19 September 2025
Source: Competitions

=== Serie B ===
==== League table ====
Pos	Team	Pld	W	D	L	GF	GA	GD	Pts	Promotion, qualification or relegation
15	Empoli	38	9	14	15	47	54	−7	41	
16	Südtirol (O)	38	8	17	13	38	48	−10	41	Qualification for relegation play-out
17	Bari (R)	38	10	10	18	38	60	−22	40	Qualification for relegation play-out
18	Reggiana (R)	38	9	10	19	36	56	−20	37	Relegation to Serie C
19	Spezia (R)	38	8	11	19	43	59	−16	35 (Note: Spezia finished ahead of Pescara on head-to-head points: Spezia 2–1 Pescara, Pescara 1–1 Spezia.)	Relegation to Serie C

Source: Serie BKT
Rules for classification: 1) Points; 2) Head-to-head points; 3) Head-to-head goal difference; 4) Goal difference; 5) Goals scored; 6) Draw.
(Note: Head-to-head record is used only after all the matches between the teams in question have been played)
(O) Play-off winners; (R) Relegated

==== Results summary ====
Overall								Home						Away					
Pld	W	D	L	GF	GA	GD	Pts	W	D	L	GF	GA	GD	W	D	L	GF	GA	GD
38	10	10	18	38	60	−22	40	7	5	7	21	25	−4	3	5	11	17	35	−18

==== Results by round ====
Round	1	2	3	4	5	6	7	8	9	10	11	12	13	14	15	16	17	18	19	20	21	22	23	24	25	26	27	28	29	30	31	32	33	34	35	36	37
Ground	A	H	A	A	A	H	H	A	H	H	A	A	A	A	H	A	A	H	A	H	A	H	A	H	H	A	H	A	A	H	A	H	H	A	H	A	H
Result	L	D	L	L	D	D	W	L	W	W	D	L	L	D	D	D	L	D	L	L	W	L	L	D	L	D	W	W	L	W	L	L	W	L	L	L	W
Position	13	15	19	19	17	17	16	17	16	14	15	17	15	15	15	14	16	15	17	19	17	19	19	19	19	19	17	17	19	16	16	17	17	17	17	18	17

Updated to match(es) played on 19 September 2025. Source:
A = Away; H = Home; W = Win; D = Draw; L = Loss

==== Matches ====
24 August 2025 1	Venezia	2–1	Bari	Venice
19:00 UTC+2	Bjarkason 9'; Duncan 43'; Korać (yellow card) 52'		Dorval 26'; Rao (yellow card) 72'	Stadium: Stadio Pier Luigi Penzo; Attendance: 8,300; Referee: Davide Di Marco

31 August 2025 2	Bari	1–1	Monza	Bari
21:00 UTC+2	Moncini 16'; Partipilo (yellow card) 33'; Kassama (yellow card) 82'		Mota 2'; Ravanelli (yellow card) 4'; Obiang (yellow card) 19'; Caprari (yellow card) 27'; Carri (yellow card) 88'	Stadium: Stadio San Nicola; Attendance: 15,010; Referee: Simone Galipò

13 September 2025 3	Modena	3–0	Bari	Modena
15:00 UTC+2	Gliozzi 32' (pen.), 54' (pen.); Sersanti (yellow card) 74'; Mendes 89'		Dorval (yellow card) 30'; Braunöder (yellow card) 59'	Stadium: Stadio Alberto Braglia; Attendance: 10,743; Referee: Andrea Calzavara

19 September 2025 4	Palermo	2–0	Bari	Palermo
21:00 UTC+2	Le Douaron 76'; Gomes 90+2'		Darboe (yellow card) 28'; Verreth (yellow card) 81'; Nikolaou (yellow card) 90+5'	Stadium: Stadio Renzo Barbera; Attendance: 32,363; Referee: Daniele Perenzoni

27 September 2025 5	Bari	1–1	Sampdoria	Bari
19:30 UTC+2	Moncini 32'; Dickmann (yellow card) 53'; Sibilli (yellow card) 87'		Çuni (yellow card) 5'; Henderson (yellow card) 7'; Depaoli (yellow card) 19', (goal) 28'; Benedetti (yellow card) 51'	Stadium: Stadio San Nicola; Attendance: 8,711; Referee: Matteo Marchetti

30 September 2025 6	Virtus Entella	2–2	Bari	Chiavari
20:30 UTC+2	Benali (yellow card) 41'; Fumagalli 48'; Tiritiello (yellow card) 51', (goal) 55'; Marconi (yellow card) 65'; Di Mario (yellow card) 71'; Franzoni (yellow card) 76'; Bariti (yellow card) 82'		Verreth 35'; Castrovilli (yellow card) 70'; Gytkjær 87'	Stadium: Stadio Comunale; Attendance: 2,126; Referee: Paride Tremolada

4 October 2025 7	Bari	2–1	Padova	Bari
15:00 UTC+2	Rao (yellow card) 28'; Castrovilli (yellow card) 56'; Moncini 71' (pen.); Cerri 84'		Bortolussi 50'; Capelli (red card) 70'	Stadium: Stadio San Nicola; Attendance: 9,717; Referee: Gianluca Manganiello

18 October 2025 8	Reggiana	3–1	Bari	Reggio Emilia
15:00 UTC+2	Papetti (yellow card) 27'; Marras (yellow card) 39'; Tavşan 45+2'; Bozzolan 70'; Charlys (yellow card) 80'; Lambourde 81'		Meroni (yellow card) 38'; Moncini 41'; Nikolaou (red card) 59'	Stadium: Mapei Stadium – Città del Tricolore; Attendance: 9,071; Referee: Maria Sole Ferrieri Caputi

26 October 2025 9	Bari	1–0	Mantova	Bari
18:15 UTC+2	Pucino (yellow card) 22'; Moncini 49'; Darboe (yellow card) 90+7'		Paoletti (yellow card) 21'; Trimboli (yellow card) 61'; Wieser (yellow card) 76'; Caprini (yellow card) 84'; Galuppini (yellow card) 85'	Stadium: Stadio San Nicola; Attendance: 9,866; Referee: Luca Massimi

2 November 2025 10	Bari	1–0	Cesena	Bari
16:00 UTC+2	Meroni (yellow card) 72'; Gytkjær 79'		Ciervo (yellow card) 69'	Stadium: Stadio San Nicola; Attendance: 9,805; Referee: Francesco Fourneau

7 November 2025 11	Spezia	1–1	Bari	Spezia
21:30 UTC+2	Kouda 36', (yellow card) 36' (red card) 42'; Candela (yellow card) 90'; Cassata (yellow card) 90+8'		Gytkjær 7'; Nikolaou (yellow card) 47'; Pucino (yellow card) 79'	Stadium: Stadio Alberto Picco; Attendance: 8,836; Referee: Andrea Calzavara

22 November 2025 12	Bari	2–3	Frosinone	Bari
20:30 UTC+2	Verreth 21'; Vicari (yellow card) 34'; Dickmann (yellow card) 42'; Castrovilli 45+3'		Raimondo 12'; Bracaglia 27', (yellow card) 69'; Ghedjemis 42'; Oyono (yellow card) 47'; Monterisi (yellow card) 87'	Stadium: Stadio San Nicola; Attendance: 10,816; Referee: Mario Perri

29 November 2025 13	Empoli	5–0	Bari	Empoli
16:00 UTC+2	Guarino 45+2'; Shpendi 52'; Ceesay (yellow card) 64', (goal) 90+1'; Yepes 66'; Pellegri 89'		Dickmann (yellow card) 24'; Vicari (yellow card) 39'	Stadium: Stadio Carlo Castellani; Attendance: 7,299; Referee: Fabio Maresca

4 December 2025 14	Juve Stabia	0–0	Bari	Castellammare di Stabia
16:00 UTC+2	Pierobon (yellow card) 1'; Cacciamani (yellow card) 51'; Piscopo (yellow card) 57'; Correia (yellow card) 88'		Castrovilli (yellow card) 25'; Dorval (yellow card) 38'; Partipilo (yellow card) 90+5'	Stadium: Stadio Romeo Menti; Attendance: 3,501; Referee: Rosario Abisso

8 December 2025 15	Bari	1–1	Pescara	Bari
18:15 UTC+2	Dorval (yellow card) 35'; Nikolaou (yellow card) 60'; Moncini (penalty missed) 65'; Meroni (yellow card) 67' (red card) 90+7'; Castrovilli (yellow card) 72'; Braunöder (yellow card) 73'; Maggiore 82'		Di Nardo 9', (yellow card) 56'; Olzer (red card) 31'; Letizia (yellow card) 59'; Desplanches (yellow card) 81'	Stadium: Stadio San Nicola; Attendance: 8,431; Referee: Matteo Marcenaro

13 December 2025 16	Südtirol	0–0	Bari	Bolzano
16:00 UTC+2	El Kaouakibi (yellow card) 4'; Tronchin (red card) 25'; Zedadka (yellow card) 34'; Davi (yellow card) 78'		Verreth (yellow card) 6'; Partipilo (yellow card) 61'	Stadium: Stadio Druso; Attendance: 3,586; Referee: Giuseppe Collu

19 December 2025 17	Bari	1–2	Catanzaro	Bari
21:30 UTC+2	Nikolaou (yellow card) 77'; Bellomo 90+3' (pen.)		Pontisso 30'; Favasuli (yellow card) 46'; Antonini 49'; Brighenti (yellow card) 82'; Rispoli (yellow card) 88'	Stadium: Stadio San Nicola; Attendance: 9,816; Referee: Antonio Rapuano

27 December 2025 18	Bari	1–1	Avellino	Bari
20:30 UTC+2	Dickmann 52'; Braunöder (yellow card) 66'; Pucino (yellow card) 88'; Cerofolini (yellow card) 90+5'		Cancellotti (yellow card) 5'; Missori (yellow card) 50'; Biasci 68'; Patierno (yellow card) 90+5'	Stadium: Stadio San Nicola; Attendance: 11,265; Referee: Luca Zufferli

10 January 2026 19	Carrarese	1–0	Bari	Carrara
16:00 UTC+2	Abiuso (yellow card) 42', (goal) 50'			Stadium: Stadio dei Marmi; Referee: Claudio Allegretta

17 January 2026 20	Bari	0–1	Juve Stabia	Bari
20:30 UTC+2	Braunöder (yellow card) 62'		Candellone 37'; Giorgini (yellow card) 46'; Zeroli (yellow card) 47'; Piscopo (yellow card) 48'; Carissoni (yellow card) 74'	Stadium: Stadio San Nicola; Referee: Davide Di Marco

24 January 2026 21	Cesena	1–2	Bari	Cesena
16:00 UTC+2	Ciervo 60'; Magni (yellow card) 74'; Mangraviti (yellow card) 80'		Cistana (yellow card) 37'; Rao 51'; De Pieri (yellow card) 72'; Moncini 76', (yellow card) 82'	Stadium: Stadio Dino Manuzzi; Referee: Livio Marinelli

30 January 2026 22	Bari	0–3	Palermo	Bari
21:30 UTC+2	Pucino (yellow card) 26'; Stabile (yellow card) 32'; Dickmann (yellow card) 65'		Palumbo (yellow card) 38'; Le Douaron 57', (yellow card) 65'; Pohjanpalo 67'; Pierozzi (yellow card) 71'; Ranocchia 82' (pen.); Bereszyński (yellow card) 88'	Stadium: Stadio San Nicola; Referee: Antonio Rapuano

7 February 2026 23	Mantova	2–1	Bari	Mantua
16:00 UTC+2	Meroni 14'; Ruocco (yellow card) 33'; Cella (yellow card) 35'; Trimboli (yellow card) 45+1'; Mensah (yellow card) 59'; Mancuso 90+4'		Odenthal 16', (yellow card) 32'; Cerofolini (yellow card) 72'	Stadium: Stadio Danilo Martelli; Referee: Federico Dionisi

11 February 2026 24	Bari	0–0	Spezia	Bari
21:00 UTC+2			Bonfanti (yellow card) 8'	Stadium: Stadio San Nicola; Referee: Daniele Doveri

15 February 2026 25	Bari	1–2	Südtirol	Bari
16:00 UTC+2	Rao 80'		Verdi (yellow card) 13'; Kofler (yellow card) 15'; Merkaj 48'; Molina (yellow card) 60'; Mané 75' (o.g.)	Stadium: Stadio San Nicola; Referee: Luca Massimi

21 February 2026 26	Padova	1–1	Bari	Padua
16:00 UTC+2	Di Mariano 13'; Barreca (yellow card) 45'; Fusi (yellow card) 48'; Perrotta (yellow card) 90+3'		Maggiore (yellow card) 32'; Cistana (yellow card) 39'; Piscopo 45+1', (yellow card) 56'; Çuni (yellow card) 90'	Stadium: Stadio Comunale Euganeo; Referee: Giuseppe Collu

27 February 2026 27	Sampdoria	0–2	Bari	Genoa
22:00 UTC+2	Palma (yellow card) 40'; Henderson (yellow card) 45'; Brunori (yellow card) 45+3'; Esposito (yellow card) 75'		Artioli (yellow card) 11'; Moncini 26'; Traoré (yellow card) 63'; Çuni (yellow card) 84'; Bellomo 90', (yellow card) 90+1'	Stadium: Stadio Luigi Ferraris; Referee: Daniele Perenzoni

4 March 2026 28	Bari	2–1	Empoli	Bari
21:00 UTC+2	Rao 42'; Esteves (yellow card) 59'; Maggiore 72'; Cistana (yellow card) 90+1'		Yepes (yellow card) 3'; Lovato (red card) 23'; Shpendi 45+1'	Stadium: Stadio San Nicola; Referee: Maria Sole Ferrieri Caputi

8 March 2026 29	Pescara	4–0	Bari	Pescara
20:30 UTC+2	Di Nardo 13', 47', (yellow card) 30'; Insigne 40' (pen.); Valzania 56'; Berardi (yellow card) 79'		De Pieri (yellow card) 28'	Stadium: Stadio Adriatico; Referee: Simone Galipo

14 March 2026 30	Bari	4–1	Reggiana	Bari
16:00 UTC+2	Artioli 10', (yellow card) 16'; Rao 15', 48'; Maggiore (yellow card) 42'; Moncini 57'		Quaranta (yellow card) 18'; Girma (yellow card) 49'; Charlys (yellow card) 70'; Bozhanaj (yellow card) 86'; Lusuardi 89'	Stadium: Stadio San Nicola; Referee: Luca Pairetto

18 March 2026 31	Frosinone	2–1	Bari	Frosinone
20:00 UTC+2	Fini 8'; Fiori (yellow card) 29'; Corrado 53'; Calvani (yellow card) 81'		Rao 2'; Dorval (yellow card) 33'; Odenthal (yellow card) 51'; De Pieri (yellow card) 90+5'	Stadium: Stadio Benito Stirpe; Referee: Fabio Maresca

22 March 2026 32	Bari	0–3	Carrarese	Bari
16:00 UTC+2			Illanes (yellow card) 42'; Rouhi 47'; Zanon (yellow card) 49'; Abiuso 72'; Bouah 81'	Stadium: Stadio San Nicola; Referee: Daniele Perenzoni

6 April 2026 33	Bari	3–1	Modena	Bari
16:00 UTC+2	Moncini 22' (pen.); Adorni 31' (o.g.); Maggiore (yellow card) 59'; Çuni 80'; Mantovani (yellow card) 90+7'		Gerli (yellow card) 88'; Ambrosino 90'; Massolin (yellow card) 90+7'	Stadium: Stadio San Nicola; Referee: Alberto Arena

11 April 2026 34	Monza	2–0	Bari	Monza
20:30 UTC+2	Obiang 50'; Petagna (yellow card) 70'; Pessina 79'		Maggiore (yellow card) 64'; Dorval (yellow card) 90+4'	Stadium: Stadio Brianteo; Referee: Federico La Penna

18 April 2026 35	Bari	0–3	Venezia	Bari
16:00 UTC+2	Rao (yellow card) 43'		Haps 19', 45+1'; Adorante 52'	Stadium: Stadio San Nicola; Referee: Federico Dionisi

24 April 2026 36	Avellino	2–0	Bari	Avellino
22:00 UTC+2	Patierno (yellow card) 11'; Besaggio 67'; Palmiero (yellow card) 72'; Palumbo 79'		Mane (yellow card) 28'; Artioli (yellow card) 81'	Stadium: Stadio Partenio-Adriano Lombardi; Referee: Gianluca Manganiello

1 May 2026 37	Bari	2–0	Virtus Entella	Bari
16:00 UTC+2	Odenthal (yellow card) 22'; Moncini 45+1'; Verreth (red card) 53'; Braunöder (yellow card) 54'; Maggiore 90+7'		Guiu (yellow card) 53' (yellow-red card) 75'; Di Mario (yellow card) 71'	Stadium: Stadio San Nicola; Referee: Maurizio Mariani

8 May 2026 38	Catanzaro	2–3	Bari	Catanzaro
21:30 UTC+2	Verrengia 12'; Buglio (yellow card) 16'; Koffi 90+7' (pen.)		Moncini 23'; Piscopo (yellow card) 26', (goal) 40', 50'	Stadium: Stadio Nicola Ceravolo; Referee: Simone Sozza

==== Relegation play-out ====
15 May 2026 First leg	Bari	0–0	Südtirol	Bari
21:00 UTC+2	Moncini (yellow card) 45+2'; Cerofolini (yellow card) 57'; Piscopo (yellow card) 72'; Bellomo (yellow card) 88'		Merkaj (yellow card) 54'; Tronchin (yellow card) 60'	Stadium: Stadio San Nicola; Referee: Antonio Rapuano

22 May 2026 Second leg	Südtirol	0–0 (0–0 agg.)	Bari	Bolzano
21:00 UTC+2	El Kaouakibi (yellow card) 19'		Maggiore (yellow card) 39'; Odenthal (yellow card) 81'; Artioli (yellow card) 85'	Stadium: Stadio Druso; Referee: Federico La Penna
Note: As the play-out ended 0–0 on aggregate, Bari were relegated to Serie C due to finishing lower than Südtirol in the regular season.

=== Coppa Italia ===
17 August 2025 First round	Milan	2–0	Bari	Milan
21:15 UTC+2	Leão 14'; Pulisic 48'			Stadium: San Siro; Attendance: 71,061; Referee: Alberto Ruben Arena

== Appearances and goals ==
As of match played 8 May 2026

Players with no appearances are not included on the list
Italics indicate a loaned in player

No.	Pos	Nat	Player	Total		Serie B		Coppa Italia	
No.	Pos	Nat	Player	Apps	Goals	Apps	Goals	Apps	Goals
1	GK	(Italy) ITA	Marco Pissardo	1	0	1+0	0	0+0	0
3	DF	(Italy) ITA	Riccardo Burgio	5	0	3+2	0	0+0	0
5	MF	(The Gambia) GAM	Ebrima Darboe	6	0	3+3	0	0+0	0
7	FW	(Italy) ITA	Giuseppe Sibilli	6	0	4+1	0	1+0	0
8	MF	(Italy) ITA	Riccardo Pagano	23	0	11+11	0	1+0	0
9	FW	(Denmark) DEN	Christian Gytkjær	25	3	10+15	3	0+0	0
10	MF	(Italy) ITA	Nicola Bellomo	14	2	0+13	2	1+0	0
11	FW	(Italy) ITA	Gabriele Moncini	38	11	31+6	11	1+0	0
13	DF	(Italy) ITA	Valerio Mantovani	14	0	12+2	0	0+0	0
17	FW	(Italy) ITA	Emanuele Rao	33	6	18+14	6	0+1	0
18	MF	(Italy) ITA	Giulio Maggiore	27	3	21+6	3	0+0	0
19	MF	(Portugal) POR	Tomás Esteves	15	0	8+7	0	0+0	0
20	MF	(Italy) ITA	Nicolò Cavuoti	7	0	3+4	0	0+0	0
21	FW	(Italy) ITA	Anthony Partipilo	12	0	5+6	0	0+1	0
24	DF	(Italy) ITA	Lorenzo Dickmann	27	1	23+3	1	1+0	0
25	DF	(Italy) ITA	Raffaele Pucino	21	0	18+3	0	0+0	0
26	DF	(Netherlands) NED	Cas Odenthal	16	1	16+0	1	0+0	0
27	MF	(Austria) AUT	Matthias Braunöder	32	0	22+9	0	1+0	0
28	FW	(Italy) ITA	Kevin Piscopo	13	3	11+2	3	0+0	0
29	MF	(Belgium) BEL	Matthias Verreth	27	2	23+3	2	0+1	0
30	MF	(Italy) ITA	Moussa Mane	16	0	11+5	0	0+0	0
31	GK	(Italy) ITA	Michele Cerofolini	38	0	37+0	0	1+0	0
37	DF	(Italy) ITA	Giacomo Stabile	3	0	1+2	0	0+0	0
43	DF	(Greece) GRE	Dimitrios Nikolaou	24	0	22+1	0	1+0	0
49	FW	(Italy) ITA	Giacomo De Pieri	10	0	4+6	0	0+0	0
51	DF	(Italy) ITA	Andrea Cistana	17	0	16+1	0	0+0	0
66	MF	(France) FRA	Daouda Traoré	9	0	3+6	0	0+0	0
80	MF	(Italy) ITA	Federico Artioli	11	1	8+3	1	0+0	0
90	FW	(Albania) ALB	Marvin Çuni	15	1	2+13	1	0+0	0
93	DF	(Algeria) ALG	Mehdi Dorval	34	1	29+4	1	1+0	0
Player(s) who featured whilst on loan but returned to parent club during the season:
15	DF	(Italy) ITA	Sheriff Kassama	6	0	3+3	0	0+0	0
16	FW	(Italy) ITA	Mirko Antonucci	14	0	7+7	0	0+0	0
99	FW	(Italy) ITA	Leonardo Cerri	10	1	0+10	1	0+0	0
Player(s) who featured but departed the club permanently during the season:
3	DF	(Italy) ITA	Alessandro Tripaldelli	1	0	0+0	0	0+1	0
4	MF	(Italy) ITA	Gaetano Castrovilli	17	1	12+5	1	0+0	0
20	FW	(Uruguay) URU	Gastón Pereiro	3	0	0+2	0	1+0	0
76	DF	(Kosovo) KOS	Indrit Mavraj	1	0	0+1	0	0+0	0
Player(s) who featured but departed the club on loan during the season:
13	DF	(Italy) ITA	Andrea Meroni	12	0	11+1	0	0+0	0
23	DF	(Italy) ITA	Francesco Vicari	10	0	9+0	0	1+0	0
32	MF	(Italy) ITA	Vincenzo Colangiuli	3	0	0+3	0	0+0	0
