= List of Italian football transfers winter 2025–26 =

The 2025–26 Italian football winter transfer window ran from 2 January to 2 February 2026. Some contracts were already signed and announced before the window opening. The page features transfers from or to Serie A and Serie B clubs.

== Transfers ==
All players and clubs without a flag are Italian.

Legend

- Those clubs in Italic indicate that the player already left the team on loan on this or the previous season or a new signing that immediately left the club.

Date	Name	Moving from	Moving to	Fee
2 January 2026	(Germany) Niclas Füllkrug	(England) West Ham	Milan	Loan
2 January 2026	Francesco Bardi	Palermo	Mantova	Loan
2 January 2026	Simone Verdi	Como	Südtirol	Undisclosed
2 January 2026	(Spain) Estanis Pedrola	Sampdoria	(Spain) Las Palmas	Loan
2 January 2026	(Israel) Manor Solomon	(England) Tottenham	Fiorentina	Loan
2 January 2026	Marco Frigerio	Lecco	Südtirol	Undisclosed
2 January 2026	Sonny D'Angelo	Avellino	Latina	Undisclosed
2 January 2026	Antonio De Cristofaro	Avellino	Latina	Loan
2 January 2026	Iacopo Lipani	Virtus Entella	Latina	Loan
2 January 2026	Alessandro Arena	Pisa	Arezzo	Loan
2 January 2026	Giacomo Maucci	Pisa	Arezzo	Loan
3 January 2026	(Brazil) Matheus Dos Santos	Saluzzo	Juve Stabia	Undisclosed
3 January 2026	Leonardo Sernicola	Cremonese	Spezia	Loan
3 January 2026	Matteo Brunori	Palermo	Sampdoria	Loan
3 January 2026	(Argentina) Gino Infantino	Fiorentina	(Argentina) Argentinos Juniors	Loan
3 January 2026	Giovanni Volpe	Catanzaro	Giugliano	Loan
3 January 2026	Andrea Oliviero	Catanzaro	Messina	Loan
3 January 2026	Mattia Alborghetti	Giana Erminio	Virtus Entella	Undisclosed
3 January 2026	Marco Sala	Como	Avellino	Loan
4 January 2026	Federico Zuccon	Atalanta	Mantova	Loan
4 January 2026	(Albania) Alen Sherri	Frosinone	Cagliari	Loan return
4 January 2026	(Serbia) Boris Radunović	Cagliari	Spezia	Loan
4 January 2026	Salvatore Esposito	Spezia	Sampdoria	Loan
4 January 2026	Andrea Cistana	Spezia	Bari	Loan
5 January 2026	Marco Ladisa	Venezia	Trento	Loan
5 January 2026	(Argentina) Taty Castellanos	Lazio	(England) West Ham	Undisclosed
5 January 2026	(Slovenia) Tjaš Begić	Parma	Sampdoria	Loan
5 January 2026	(Switzerland) Abdullah Laidani	(Switzerland) Wil	Modena	Loan
6 January 2026	Niccolò Squizzato	Pescara	Virtus Entella	Undisclosed
6 January 2026	Manuel De Luca	Cremonese	Modena	Loan
6 January 2026	(Brazil) Isaac	(Brazil) Atlético Mineiro	Verona	Undisclosed
6 January 2026	(Colombia) Juan David Arizala	(Colombia) Independiente Medellín	Udinese	Undisclosed
6 January 2026	Luigi Palomba	Virtus Entella	Forlì	Loan
7 January 2026	Tommaso Martinelli	Fiorentina	Sampdoria	Loan
7 January 2026	(Morocco) Naïm Byar	Bologna	(Morocco) Wydad	Undisclosed
7 January 2026	Filippo Reale	Roma	Avellino	Loan
7 January 2026	Francesco Galuppini	Mantova	Ascoli	Undisclosed
7 January 2026	Roberto Ogunseye	Cesena	Giugliano	Loan
7 January 2026	Kevin Zeroli	Milan	Juve Stabia	Loan
8 January 2026	(Austria) Franz Stolz	Genoa	(Austria) Grazer	Loan
8 January 2026	Lorenzo Menegazzo	Bologna	Foggia	Loan
8 January 2026	(Uruguay) Martín Suárez	(Uruguay) Montevideo Wanderers	Reggiana	Free
8 January 2026	(Serbia) Petar Ratkov	(Austria) Red Bull Salzburg	Lazio	Undisclosed
8 January 2026	(Iraq) Marko Farji	(Norway) Strømsgodset	Venezia	Undisclosed
8 January 2026	(Argentina) Valentín Carboni	Inter	(Argentina) Racing Club	Loan
8 January 2026	(Croatia) Ante Vuković	Pisa	Mantova	Loan
8 January 2026	(France) Mattéo Guendouzi	Lazio	(Turkey) Fenerbahçe	Undisclosed
9 January 2026	Marco Brescianini	Atalanta	Fiorentina	Loan
9 January 2026	Giacomo Stabile	Inter	Bari	Loan
9 January 2026	Giacomo De Pieri	Inter	Bari	Loan
9 January 2026	Emanuele Adamo	Cesena	Spezia	Undisclosed
9 January 2026	Antonio Troise	Unattached	Carrarese	Free
9 January 2026	(Brazil) Arthur Borghi	(Brazil) Corinthians	Verona	Undisclosed
9 January 2026	(Israel) Omri Gandelman	(Belgium) Gent	Lecce	Undisclosed
9 January 2026	(Spain) Yellu Santiago	Lecce	(Portugal) Arouca	Loan
9 January 2026	(Brazil) Hernani	Parma	Monza	Undisclosed
9 January 2026	Jacopo Sardo	Monza	Milan	Undisclosed
9 January 2026	(Netherlands) Kenneth Taylor	(Netherlands) Ajax	Lazio	Undisclosed
9 January 2026	(Tunisia) Hamza Rafia	Lecce	(Tunisia) Espérance Tunis	Undisclosed
9 January 2026	Luca Belardinelli	Empoli	Reggiana	Loan
9 January 2026	(Romania) Andrei Coubiș	Milan	Sampdoria	Undisclosed (Note: The player already played for his new club in 2025–26 season, the deal turned from temporary to definitive.)
9 January 2026	(Romania) Andrei Coubiș	Sampdoria	(Romania) U Cluj	Loan
9 January 2026	Damiano Basilio	Reggiana	Lecco	Loan
10 January 2026	(Togo) Sadik Fofana	(Austria) Grazer	Lecce	Undisclosed
10 January 2026	Giuseppe Panico	Avellino	Ternana	Loan
11 January 2026	(Spain) Pablo Marí	Fiorentina	(Saudi Arabia) Al Hilal	Undisclosed
12 January 2026	Claudio Manzi	Avellino	Monopoli	Loan
13 January 2026	Riccardo Turicchia	Juve Next Gen	Virtus Entella	Undisclosed
13 January 2026	Luigi Cuppone	Audace Cerignola	Virtus Entella	Undisclosed
13 January 2026	Nicolò Buso	Catanzaro	Mantova	Loan
13 January 2026	(Mauritania) Oumar Ngom	(Portugal) Estrela Amadora	Lecce	Undisclosed
13 January 2026	(Slovenia) Domen Črnigoj	Triestina	Südtirol	Undisclosed
13 January 2026	Tomas Lepri	Catanzaro	Sambenedettese	Loan
14 January 2026	(Germany) Matteo Palma	Udinese	Sampdoria	Loan
14 January 2026	(The Gambia) Eliman Cham	Carrarese	Igea Virtus	Loan
14 January 2026	Christian Dalle Mura	Cosenza	Juve Stabia	Undisclosed
14 January 2026	(Nigeria) Rafiu Durosinmi	(Czech Republic) Viktoria Plzeň	Pisa	Undisclosed
14 January 2026	(Bulgaria) Rosen Bozhinov	(Belgium) Antwerp	Pisa	Undisclosed
14 January 2026	Matteo Onofri	Spezia	Forlì	Loan
14 January 2026	Pietro Candelari	Spezia	Trento	Loan
14 January 2026	Giangiacomo Magnani	Reggiana	Palermo	Loan return
14 January 2026	(France) Robinio Vaz	(France) Marseille	Roma	Undisclosed
15 January 2026	Mattia Valoti	Cremonese	Spezia	Undisclosed
15 January 2026	Michele Avella	Palermo	Guidonia	Undisclosed
15 January 2026	(Spain) Iker Bravo	Udinese	(Spain) Las Palmas	Loan
15 January 2026	(France) Come Bianay Balcot	Torino	Mantova	Loan
15 January 2026	Manuel Marras	Reggiana	Union Brescia	Undisclosed
15 January 2026	(Albania) Kleis Bozhanaj	Modena	Reggiana	Loan
15 January 2026	Edoardo Duca	Juve Stabia	Lecco	Loan
15 January 2026	Giacomo Raspadori	(Spain) Atlético Madrid	Atalanta	Undisclosed
16 January 2026	(Netherlands) Donyell Malen	(England) Aston Villa	Roma	Loan
16 January 2026	(Switzerland) Alessandro Romano	Roma	Spezia	Loan
16 January 2026	(Slovenia) Tio Cipot	Spezia	(Slovenia) Maribor	Undisclosed
16 January 2026	(Spain) Víctor Narro	Sampdoria	(Spain) Real Murcia	Loan
16 January 2026	(Netherlands) Elayis Tavşan	Verona	(Turkey) Samsunspor	Undisclosed
16 January 2026	Alessandro Pavanati	Verona	Reggiana	Loan
16 January 2026	(Norway) Eivind Helland	(Norway) Brann	Bologna	Loan
17 January 2026	Fabio Ponsi	Modena	Catania	Undisclosed
17 January 2026	Mattia Viti	(France) Nice	Sampdoria	Loan
17 January 2026	(Serbia) Dimitrije Kamenović	Lazio	Lokomotiva	Loan
17 January 2026	(Belgium) Jeremy Mbambi	Pisa	Pontedera	Loan
18 January 2026	(Spain) Pol Lirola	(France) Marseille	Verona	Free
19 January 2026	(England) Jack Harrison	(England) Leeds United	Fiorentina	Loan
19 January 2026	(Spain) Rafael Obrador	(Portugal) Benfica	Torino	Loan
19 January 2026	Vittorio Magni	Milan Futuro	Cesena	Undisclosed
20 January 2026	Diego Rossi	Cesena	Forlì	Undisclosed
20 January 2026	Alessandro Vinciguerra	Cagliari	Monopoli	Loan
20 January 2026	(England) Ben Godfrey	Atalanta	(Denmark) Brøndby	Loan
20 January 2026	(Netherlands) Justin Bijlow	(Netherlands) Feyenoord	Genoa	Undisclosed
20 January 2026	(Norway) Mathias Fjørtoft Løvik	Parma	(Turkey) Trabzonspor	Undisclosed
20 January 2026	(Portugal) Tiago Gonçalves	(Hungary) Újpest	Mantova	Loan
20 January 2026	(Slovenia) Žan Majer	Mantova	Ternana	Loan
20 January 2026	(Finland) Eetu Mömmö	Lecce	(Finland) SJK	Undisclosed
20 January 2026	(Colombia) Luis Rivas	(Colombia) Atlético Nacional	Torino	Undisclosed
21 January 2026	Giovanni Fabbian	Bologna	Fiorentina	Loan
21 January 2026	(Ghana) Ibrahim Sulemana	Atalanta	Cagliari	Loan
21 January 2026	Alberto Dossena	Como	Cagliari	Loan
21 January 2026	(Jamaica) Leon Bailey	Roma	(England) Aston Villa	Loan return
21 January 2026	Edoardo Bove	Roma	(England) Watford	Free
21 January 2026	(Greece) Konstantinos Chrysopoulos	(Greece) AEK Athens	Mantova	Loan
21 January 2026	(Kosovo) Indrit Mavraj	Bari	(Poland) Lechia Gdańsk	Undisclosed
22 January 2026	(Austria) Stefan Posch	Bologna	Como	Undisclosed
22 January 2026	(Austria) Stefan Posch	Como	(Germany) 1. FSV Mainz 05	Loan
22 January 2026	Gianmarco Cangiano	Pescara	Foggia	Loan
22 January 2026	(Georgia (country)) Dachi Lordkipanidze	Cremonese	Carrarese	Loan
22 January 2026	(Bosnia and Herzegovina) Edin Džeko	Fiorentina	(Germany) Schalke 04	Undisclosed
22 January 2026	(Switzerland) Simon Sohm	Fiorentina	Bologna	Loan
22 January 2026	Jacopo Sassi	Atalanta	Avellino	Loan
22 January 2026	(Romania) Mihai Popa	Torino	(Romania) CFR Cluj	Undisclosed
22 January 2026	(Morocco) Walid Cheddira	Napoli	Lecce	Loan
22 January 2026	(Morocco) Amir Richardson	Fiorentina	(Denmark) Copenhagen	Loan
22 January 2026	Simone Panada	Atalanta U23	Venezia	Undisclosed
22 January 2026	Simone Panada	Venezia	Atalanta U23	Loan
22 January 2026	Giuseppe Caso	Modena	Monza	Loan
22 January 2026	Lorenzo Malagrida	Sampdoria	Livorno	Undisclosed
22 January 2026	(Chile) Felipe Loyola	(Argentina) Independiente	Pisa	Undisclosed
23 January 2026	(Sweden) Jesper Karlsson	Bologna	(Netherlands) Utrecht	Loan
23 January 2026	(Argentina) Facundo Lescano	Avellino	Salernitana	Loan
23 January 2026	Tommaso Baldanzi	Roma	Genoa	Loan
23 January 2026	Giovanni Lauricella	Empoli	Genoa	Loan
23 January 2026	(Spain) Vicente Guaita	Parma	Unattached	Released
23 January 2026	(Sweden) Nils Zätterström	(England) Sheffield United	Genoa	Loan
23 January 2026	(Burkina Faso) Latif Ouedraogo	Virtus Francavilla	Genoa	Undisclosed
23 January 2026	(Bulgaria) Adrian Raychev	Pisa	Pontedera	Loan
23 January 2026	Rachid Kouda	Parma	Mantova	Loan
23 January 2026	Davide Bettella	Catanzaro	Pescara	Undisclosed
23 January 2026	Valerio Crespi	Avellino	Union Brescia	Loan
23 January 2026	Armando Izzo	Avellino	Monza	Undisclosed
23 January 2026	Davide Biraschi	Frosinone	(Turkey) Karagümrük	Loan
23 January 2026	(Netherlands) Noa Lang	Napoli	(Turkey) Galatasaray	Loan
23 January 2026	Lorenzo Lucca	Napoli	(England) Nottingham Forest	Loan
23 January 2026	(Finland) Henri Salomaa	Lecce	(Finland) Inter Turku	Undisclosed
23 January 2026	Alessandro Russo	Sassuolo	Cerignola	Loan
23 January 2026	Nicolas Trabucchi	Parma	Dolomiti Bellunesi	Loan
24 January 2026	(Spain) Unai Nuñez	Verona	(Spain) Celta Vigo	Loan return
24 January 2026	Lorenzo Venturino	Genoa	Roma	Loan
24 January 2026	(Brazil) Giovane	Verona	Napoli	Undisclosed
25 January 2026	Antonio Fiori	Mantova	Frosinone	Loan
25 January 2026	(Portugal) Tomás Esteves	Pisa	Bari	Loan
26 January 2026	Alessandro Sugamele	Roma	Cagliari	Undisclosed
26 January 2026	Francesco Vicari	Bari	Reggiana	Loan
26 January 2026	(Albania) Marvin Çuni	(Russia) Rubin Kazan	Bari	Loan
26 January 2026	Seydou Fini	Genoa	Frosinone	Loan
26 January 2026	(Nigeria) David Ankeye	Genoa	(Cyprus) Krasava ENY	Loan
26 January 2026	(Germany) Marlon Ubani	Lecce	Cavese	Loan
26 January 2026	(Mali) Coli Saco	Napoli	Casertana	Loan
26 January 2026	(England) Tammy Abraham	Roma	(Turkey) Beşiktaş	€13M
26 January 2026	(Argentina) Franco Vázquez	Cremonese	(Argentina) Belgrano	Free
27 January 2026	(Guinea) Cheick Condé	Venezia	(Austria) BW Linz	Loan
27 January 2026	(Greece) Christos Mandas	Lazio	(England) Bournemouth	Loan
27 January 2026	Edoardo Motta	Reggiana	Lazio	Undisclosed
27 January 2026	(Bosnia and Herzegovina) Milan Đurić	Parma	Cremonese	Undisclosed
27 January 2026	(Republic of Ireland) Senan Mullen	Torino	(Republic of Ireland) Bohemian	Loan
27 January 2026	Emanuele Torrasi	Perugia	Juve Stabia	Undisclosed
27 January 2026	Matteo Baldi	Juve Stabia	Torres	Loan
27 January 2026	(France) Fahem Benaïssa-Yahia	(Portugal) Casa Pia	Mantova	Loan
27 January 2026	(Argentina) Tomás Palacios	Inter	(Argentina) Estudiantes	Loan
27 January 2026	(Uruguay) Agustín Albarracín	(Uruguay) Boston River	Cagliari	Undisclosed
27 January 2026	(Brazil) Lucas Marcon	(Brazil) Avaí	Reggiana	Undisclosed
27 January 2026	(Croatia) Tomi Petrović	Juve Stabia	Pergolettese	Loan
27 January 2026	Elia Giani	Pisa	Carpi	Loan
27 January 2026	Daniel Maldini	Atalanta	Lazio	Loan
27 January 2026	(Argentina) Mateo Scheffer Branco	Carrarese	Ospitaletto	Loan
27 January 2026	(Uruguay) Gastón Brugman	Unattached	Pescara	Free
28 January 2026	Alessio Cragno	Unattached	Südtirol	Free
28 January 2026	Matteo Dagasso	Pescara	Venezia	Undisclosed
28 January 2026	(France) Frédéric Guilbert	Lecce	(France) Nantes	Free
28 January 2026	(Greece) Christos Papadopoulos	Genoa	(Greece) Levadiakos	Undisclosed
28 January 2026	(Chile) Damián Pizarro	Udinese	(Argentina) Racing Club	Loan
28 January 2026	Leonardo Capezzi	Carrarese	Sorrento	Undisclosed
28 January 2026	(Brazil) Brenner	Udinese	(Brazil) Vasco da Gama	Undisclosed
28 January 2026	Nicolò Cavuoti	Cagliari	Bari	Loan
28 January 2026	Giovanni Bonfanti	Atalanta	Spezia	Loan
28 January 2026	(Brazil) Douglas Luiz	Juventus	(England) Aston Villa	Loan
28 January 2026	(France) Solomon Loubao	(France) Sochaux	Monza	Undisclosed
28 January 2026	(France) Solomon Loubao	Monza	(France) Sochaux	Loan
28 January 2026	Simone Romagnoli	Sampdoria	Empoli	Undisclosed
28 January 2026	Pietro Pinelli	Lazio	Reggiana	Loan
28 January 2026	Kevin Meola	Ancona	Genoa	Undisclosed
29 January 2026	(Poland) Przemysław Wiśniewski	Spezia	(Poland) Widzew Łódź	Loan
29 January 2026	(Brazil) Alex Amorim	(Portugal) Alverca	Genoa	Undisclosed
29 January 2026	(Switzerland) Junior Ligue	(Switzerland) Zürich	Venezia	Undisclosed
29 January 2026	Lorenzo Busato	Venezia	Campodarsego	Loan
29 January 2026	Simone Ascione	Venezia	Triestina	Loan
29 January 2026	Edoardo Mariani	Vis Pesaro	Venezia	Undisclosed
29 January 2026	Edoardo Mariani	Venezia	Vis Pesaro	Loan
29 January 2026	Alessandro Di Pardo	Cagliari	Sampdoria	Loan
29 January 2026	(Argentina) Franco Carboni	Inter	Parma	Loan
29 January 2026	Hans Nicolussi Caviglia	Venezia	Parma	Loan
29 January 2026	(Germany) Lion Lauberbach	(Belgium) Mechelen	Venezia	Loan
29 January 2026	Giacomo Fedel	Mantova	Monopoli	Loan
29 January 2026	Francesco Gallea	Lumezzane	Cagliari	Undisclosed
29 January 2026	Francesco Gallea	Cagliari	Lumezzane	Loan
29 January 2026	(France) Mohamed Kaba	Lecce	(France) Nantes	Loan
29 January 2026	(Bulgaria) Mert Durmush	Pisa	Pesaro	Loan
29 January 2026	Leonardo Benedetti	Sampdoria	Virtus Entella	Undisclosed
29 January 2026	Sebastiano Di Paolo	Siracusa	Cagliari	Undisclosed
29 January 2026	Sebastiano Di Paolo	Cagliari	Siracusa	Loan
29 January 2026	(Albania) Adi Kurti	Verona	Ternana	Loan
30 January 2026	Antonio Candela	Venezia	Spezia	Undisclosed
30 January 2026	Antonio Candela	Spezia	Empoli	Loan
30 January 2026	(Czech Republic) Daniel Fila	Venezia	Empoli	Loan
30 January 2026	Marco Ruggero	Juve Stabia	Spezia	Undisclosed
30 January 2026	Matteo Cardinali	Cittadella	Reggiana	Undisclosed
30 January 2026	Gianluca Saro	Cremonese	Cittadella	Undisclosed
30 January 2026	(France) Nesta Elphege	(France) Grenoble	Parma	Undisclosed
30 January 2026	(Switzerland) Junior Ligue	Venezia	Mantova	Loan
30 January 2026	Manuel Cicconi	Carrarese	Sampdoria	Loan
30 January 2026	Gianluca Caprari	Monza	Padova	Undisclosed
30 January 2026	(Portugal) Gonçalo Esteves	Udinese	Catanzaro	Undisclosed
30 January 2026	(Slovenia) Sandi Lovrić	Udinese	Verona	Loan
30 January 2026	Lorenzo Insigne	Unattached	Pescara	Free
30 January 2026	Patrick Cutrone	Como	Monza	Loan
30 January 2026	Matteo Prati	Cagliari	Torino	Loan
30 January 2026	(Scotland) Kieron Bowie	(Scotland) Hibernian	Verona	Loan
30 January 2026	(Albania) Kristjan Asllani	Inter	(Turkey) Beşiktaş	Loan
30 January 2026	(Sweden) Jonas Rouhi	Juventus	Carrarese	Loan
30 January 2026	(Switzerland) Filip Stojilković	(Poland) Cracovia	Pisa	Undisclosed
30 January 2026	Manuel Ricciardi	Cosenza	Juve Stabia	Loan
30 January 2026	(Canada) Damar Dixon	Frosinone	(Canada) Toronto FC II	Loan
31 January 2026	(Belgium) Cyril Ngonge	Napoli	(Spain) Espanyol	Loan
31 January 2026	Luca Marianucci	Napoli	Torino	Loan
31 January 2026	(Poland) Adrian Przyborek	(Poland) Pogoń Szczecin	Lazio	Undisclosed
31 January 2026	(Cyprus) Nikolas Ioannou	Sampdoria	(Cyprus) Pafos	Undisclosed
31 January 2026	(Serbia) Stefan Mitrović	Verona	(Greece) Asteras Aktor	Loan
31 January 2026	(Morocco) Youssef Maleh	Lecce	Cremonese	Loan
31 January 2026	(Norway) Leo Østigård	(France) Rennes	Genoa	Undisclosed
31 January 2026	(Croatia) Sandro Kulenović	(Croatia) Dinamo Zagreb	Torino	Loan
31 January 2026	(Angola) M'Bala Nzola	Fiorentina	Sassuolo	Loan
31 January 2026	Kevin Piscopo	Juve Stabia	Bari	Loan
31 January 2026	Alessandro Vimercati	Südtirol	Trapani	Loan
31 January 2026	Alessandro Mallamo	Südtirol	Union Brescia	Loan
31 January 2026	Francesco Di Mariano	Modena	Padova	Undisclosed
31 January 2026	(Cyprus) Grigoris Kastanos	Verona	(Cyprus) Aris Limassol	Loan
31 January 2026	(France) Balthazar Pierret	Lecce	(France) Red Star	Undisclosed
31 January 2026	Sheriff Kassama	Trento	Juve Stabia	Loan
1 February 2026	(Ivory Coast) Owen Kouassi	Lecce	(France) Laval	Loan
1 February 2026	(Ivory Coast) Jérémie Boga	(France) Nice	Juventus	Loan
1 February 2026	(Spain) Lamine Fanne	(England) Luton Town	Venezia	Undisclosed
1 February 2026	(Colombia) Yeferson Paz	Sassuolo	Reggiana	Loan
1 February 2026	Joey Zwaan	(Netherlands) ADO '20	Reggiana	Free
1 February 2026	Alessandro Micai	(Romania) CFR Cluj	Reggiana	Free
1 February 2026	Ciro Immobile	Bologna	(France) Paris	Loan
1 February 2026	(Netherlands) Othniël Raterink	(Netherlands) De Graafschap	Cagliari	Undisclosed
2 February 2026	Nicola Pintus	Cagliari	Cosenza	Loan
2 February 2026	Enrico Silletti	Team Altamura	Padova	Undisclosed
2 February 2026	Enrico Silletti	Padova	Team Altamura	Loan
2 February 2026	Giovanni Giunti	Perugia	Padova	Loan
2 February 2026	Tommaso Corazza	Bologna	Cesena	Loan
2 February 2026	(France) Andréa Le Borgne	Como	Avellino	Loan
2 February 2026	Alessandro Pilati	Union Brescia	Virtus Entella	Loan
2 February 2026	Giuseppe Ambrosino	Napoli	Modena	Loan
2 February 2026	Riccardo Tonin	Pescara	Südtirol	Loan
2 February 2026	(Mali) Salim Diakité	Palermo	Juve Stabia	Loan
2 February 2026	(Brazil) Mateus Lusuardi	Pisa	Reggiana	Loan
2 February 2026	(Denmark) Laurs Skjellerup	Sassuolo	Spezia	Loan
2 February 2026	Marco Meli	Juve Stabia	Crotone	Loan
2 February 2026	(Faroe Islands) Andrias Edmundsson	(Poland) Wisła Płock	Verona	Undisclosed
2 February 2026	Andrea Meroni	Bari	Mantova	Loan
2 February 2026	Valerio Mantovani	Mantova	Bari	Undisclosed
2 February 2026	Federico Artioli	Mantova	Bari	Loan
2 February 2026	Davide Colangiuli	Bari	Lumezzane	Loan
2 February 2026	Louis Buffon	Pisa	Pontedera	Loan
2 February 2026	Lorenzo Moretti	Cremonese	Union Brescia	Loan
2 February 2026	Luca Magnino	Modena	Empoli	Undisclosed
2 February 2026	(Burkina Faso) Chec Bebel Doumbia	Team Altamura	Genoa	Undisclosed
2 February 2026	(Burkina Faso) Chec Bebel Doumbia	Genoa	Team Altamura	Loan
2 February 2026	(Norway) Morten Thorsby	Genoa	Cremonese	Undisclosed
2 February 2026	Tommaso Milanese	Cremonese	Ascoli	Undisclosed
2 February 2026	(Norway) Dennis Johnsen	Cremonese	Palermo	Undisclosed
2 February 2026	Daniele Rugani	Juventus	Fiorentina	Loan
2 February 2026	(Germany) Armel Bella-Kotchap	(England) Southampton	Verona	Undisclosed
2 February 2026	Alphadjo Cisse	Verona	Milan	Undisclosed
2 February 2026	Alphadjo Cisse	Milan	Catanzaro	Loan
2 February 2026	(Portugal) Leonardo Buta	Udinese	(Portugal) Rio Ave	Loan
2 February 2026	(Portugal) João Mário	Juventus	Bologna	Loan
2 February 2026	(Germany) Adin Ličina	(Germany) Bayern Munich	Juventus	Undisclosed
2 February 2026	Daniele Baselli	Padova	Chievo	Undisclosed
2 February 2026	Lorenzo Sgarbi	Napoli	Avellino	Loan
2 February 2026	(Netherlands) Cas Odenthal	Sassuolo	Bari	Loan
2 February 2026	(Spain) Lamine Fanne	Venezia	Pescara	Loan
2 February 2026	Andrea Cagnano	Avellino	Pescara	Loan
2 February 2026	(Brazil) Gabriel Strefezza	(Greece) Olympiacos	Parma	Loan
2 February 2026	(Sweden) Emil Holm	Bologna	Juventus	Loan
2 February 2026	(Nigeria) Ademola Lookman	Atalanta	(Spain) Atlético Madrid	Undisclosed
2 February 2026	(Spain) Bryan Zaragoza	(Germany) Bayern Munich	Roma	Loan
2 February 2026	(Croatia) Branimir Mlačić	(Croatia) Hajduk	Udinese	Undisclosed
2 February 2026	(Angola) Rui Modesto	Udinese	Palermo	Loan
2 February 2026	(Georgia (country)) Saba Goglichidze	Udinese	(England) Watford	Loan
2 February 2026	(Cameroon) Enzo Ebosse	Udinese	Torino	Loan
2 February 2026	Nicholas Pierini	Sassuolo	Sampdoria	Loan
2 February 2026	Mattia Benvenuto	Spezia	Carpi	Loan
2 February 2026	Mirko Antonucci	Spezia	Salernitana	Loan
2 February 2026	Edoardo Soleri	Spezia	Sampdoria	Loan
2 February 2026	Alessandro Bellemo	Sampdoria	Spezia	Loan
2 February 2026	Stefano Girelli	Sampdoria	Casertana	Loan
2 February 2026	(France) Ali Dembélé	Torino	Mantova	Loan
2 February 2026	(Morocco) Adam Masina	Torino	Unattached	Released
2 February 2026	(France) Darryl Bakola	(France) Marseille	Sassuolo	Undisclosed
2 February 2026	(Switzerland) Ulisses Garcia	(France) Marseille	Sassuolo	Loan
2 February 2026	(Canada) Ismaël Koné	(France) Marseille	Sassuolo	Undisclosed
2 February 2026	(Brazil) Pedro Felipe	Juventus	Sassuolo	Loan
2 February 2026	Flavio Russo	Sassuolo	Pescara	Loan
2 February 2026	(Croatia) Borna Knezović	Sassuolo	Trapani	Loan
2 February 2026	Gioele Venuti	Udinese	Sassuolo	Loan
2 February 2026	Marco Ballarini	Udinese	Unattached	Released
2 February 2026	Marco Delle Monache	Lecce	Potenza	Loan
2 February 2026	(Spain) Tete Morente	Lecce	(Spain) Elche	Free
2 February 2026	(Angola) Zito Luvumbo	Cagliari	(Spain) Mallorca	Loan
2 February 2026	Sebastiano Luperto	Cagliari	Cremonese	Undisclosed
2 February 2026	Alvin Okoro	Venezia	Juve Stabia	Loan
2 February 2026	Giorgio Altare	Venezia	Pescara	Loan
2 February 2026	(Norway) Emil Bohinen	Genoa	Venezia	Undisclosed
2 February 2026	(Morocco) Saad El Haddad	Venezia	Pineto	Loan
2 February 2026	(Uruguay) Matías Vecino	Lazio	(Spain) Celta Vigo	Loan
2 February 2026	(France) Daouda Traoré	Southampton	Bari	Undisclosed
2 February 2026	(Spain) Jalen Blesa	Cesena	(Portugal) Rio Ave	Undisclosed
2 February 2026	Raffaele Celia	Cesena	Benevento	Undisclosed
2 February 2026	Gaetano Castrovilli	Bari	Cesena	Undisclosed
2 February 2026	Fellipe Jack	Como	Catanzaro	Loan
2 February 2026	Alberto Cerri	Como	Cesena	Undisclosed
2 February 2026	Jacopo Simonetta	Como	Siracusa	Loan
2 February 2026	Tommaso Fumagalli	Como	Reggiana	Loan
2 February 2026	(Brazil) Alisson Santos	(Portugal) Sporting	Napoli	Loan
2 February 2026	(England) Samuel Iling-Junior	(England) Aston Villa	Pisa	Loan
2 February 2026	(France) Yanis Massolin	Modena	Inter	Undisclosed
2 February 2026	(France) Yanis Massolin	Inter	Modena	Loan
2 February 2026	Antonio Imputato	Monopoli	Modena	Undisclosed
2 February 2026	Luca Pandolfi	Cittadella	Avellino	Undisclosed
2 February 2026	Emanuel Vignato	Pisa	(Cyprus) Akritas Chlorakas	Loan
2 February 2026	(Slovenia) Miha Trdan	Pisa	(Bulgaria) Lokomotiv Plovdiv	Undisclosed
2 February 2026	(Lithuania) Motiejus Šapola	Pisa	Pontedera	Undisclosed
2 February 2026	Riccardo Bassarini	Pisa	Pavia	Loan
2 February 2026	(Argentina) Matias Casarosa	Pisa	Arezzo	Undisclosed
2 February 2026	(Denmark) Oliver Urso	Reggiana	Lecco	Loan
2 February 2026	Tommaso Guercio	(Poland) Śląsk Wrocław	Carrarese	Loan
2 February 2026	(Albania) Erdis Kraja	Pescara	Pineto	Undisclosed
2 February 2026	Riccardo Brosco	Pescara	Foggia	Undisclosed
2 February 2026	(Switzerland) Nikolas Muci	(Switzerland) Grasshopper	Mantova	Loan
2 February 2026	Cristiano Bani	Mantova	Ravenna	Undisclosed
2 February 2026	Giacomo Poluzzi	Südtirol	Ravenna	Undisclosed
2 February 2026	Daniele Borra	Ravenna	Südtirol	Undisclosed
2 February 2026	Davide Pio Stabile	Vis Pesaro	Virtus Entella	Undisclosed
2 February 2026	Mattia Tirelli	Monopoli	Virtus Entella	Undisclosed
2 February 2026	(Libya) Ahmad Benali	Virtus Entella	(Libya) Al Ittihad	Free
2 February 2026	Gianluca Di Chiara	Catanzaro	Arezzo	Undisclosed
2 February 2026	Diego Marcolini	Trapani	Padova	Undisclosed
2 February 2026	Diego Marcolini	Padova	Trapani	Loan
3 February 2026	(Spain) Buba Sangaré	Roma	(Spain) Elche	Loan
3 February 2026	(Paraguay) Hugo Cuenca	Genoa	(Spain) Burgos	Loan
3 February 2026	(Sweden) Adrian Lahdo	(Sweden) Hammarby	Como	Undisclosed
3 February 2026	(Poland) Adrian Benedyczak	Parma	(Turkey) Kasımpaşa	Loan
3 February 2026	(Ivory Coast) N'dri Philippe Koffi	(Malta) Ħamrun Spartans	Catanzaro	Undisclosed
5 February 2026	(Albania) Giacomo Vrioni	Unattached	Cesena	Free
5 February 2026	(Poland) Mateusz Kowalski	Parma	(Poland) Miedź Legnica	Loan
6 February 2026	(Colombia) Devis Vásquez	Roma	(Turkey) Beşiktaş	Loan
6 February 2026	Daniele Verde	Spezia	(Turkey) Fatih Karagümrük	Loan
6 February 2026	(Ivory Coast) Christian Kouamé	Fiorentina	(Greece) Aris Thessaloniki	Undisclosed
