= Joop Odenthal =

Dutch association football player

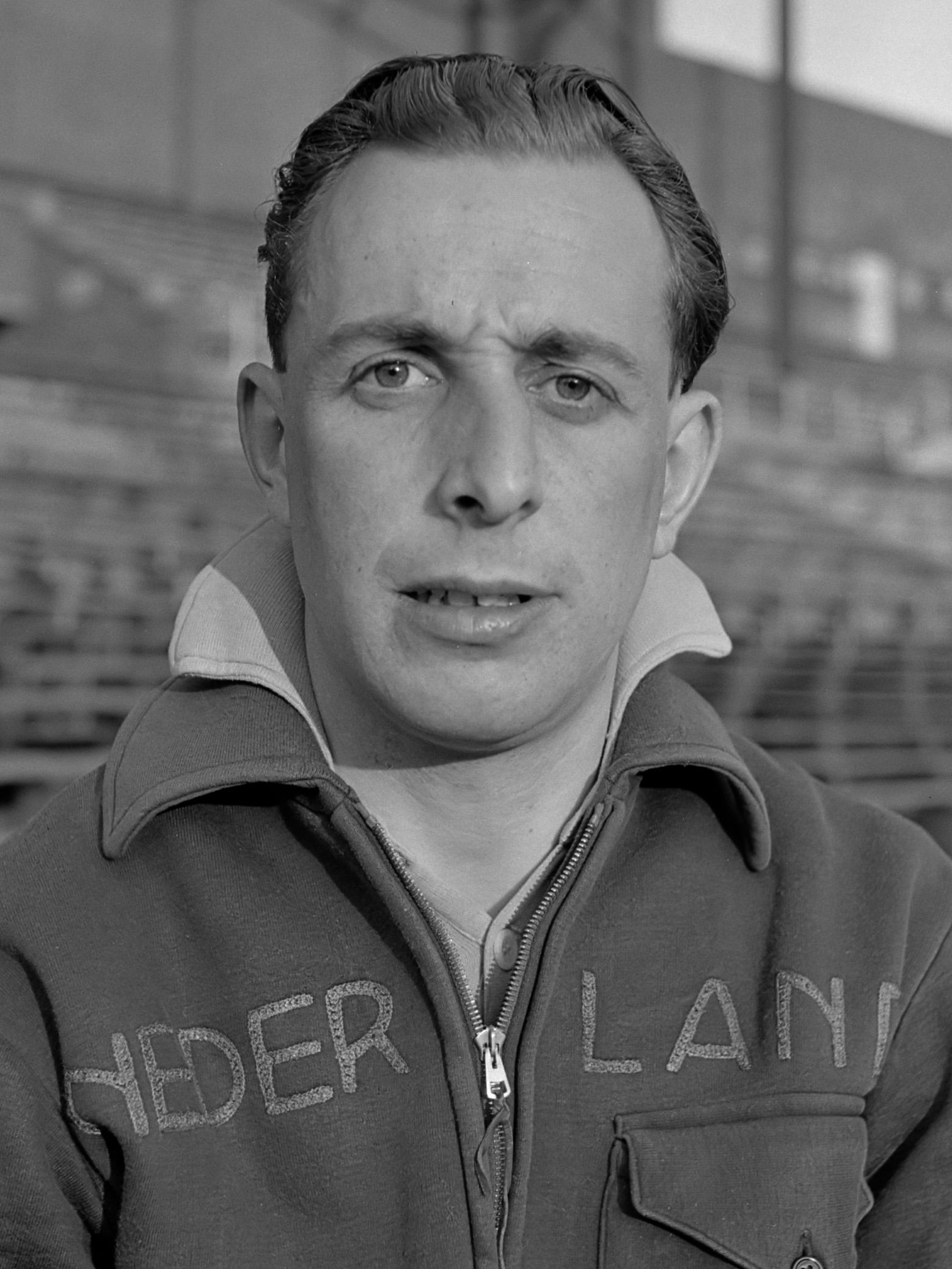
- Odenthal in 1951

Personal information
- Date of birth: 13 March 1924
- Place of birth: Haarlem, Netherlands
- Date of death: 19 January 2005 (aged 80)
- Place of death: Neede, Netherlands
- Position: Defender

Senior career*
Years	Team	Apps	(Gls)
–1954	EDO		
1954–1957	Haarlem		
1957–1960	SC Enschede	127	(1)
1960–1961	Tubantia		

International career
1951–1956	Netherlands	24	(0)

Managerial career
- Quick '20
- * Club domestic league appearances and goals

Johannes Bernardus "Joop" Odenthal (13 March 1924 – 19 January 2005) was a Dutch footballer, baseball player and football manager. He competed in the men's tournament at the 1952 Summer Olympics, representing the Netherlands.

== Career ==
=== Football ===
Odenthal played for EDO, Haarlem, SC Enschede, and Tubantia. Born in Haarlem, his move from EDO to in-city rival HFC Haarlem was hugely unpopular among fans. After a move to Enschede, he continued his football career with the two main Hoofdklasse clubs from that city. Between 1951 and 1956, he made 24 appearances for the Netherlands national team. He made his international debut against Finland in 1951. After his active sports career, Odenthal for a long time coached both baseball players and footballers at Achilles '12 in Hengelo. He also coached the senior team of Quick '20. Odenthal, together with Henk Schijvenaar and Cor Wilders, remains one of the only athletes competing for both the Netherlands football team and baseball team.

=== Baseball ===
Odenthal also played baseball between 1946 and 1954 for Haarlem Hoofdklasse club EDO, where he was a shortstop and third baseman. In 1948 and 1949, he appeared twice for the Netherlands national baseball team during the international matches against Belgium.

== Personal life ==
Odenthal died on 19 January 2005. Odenthal is the grandfather of Cas Odenthal, who has played football in the Eredivisie and Serie A in Italy.
