= Henk Schijvenaar =

Dutch footballer (1918–1996)

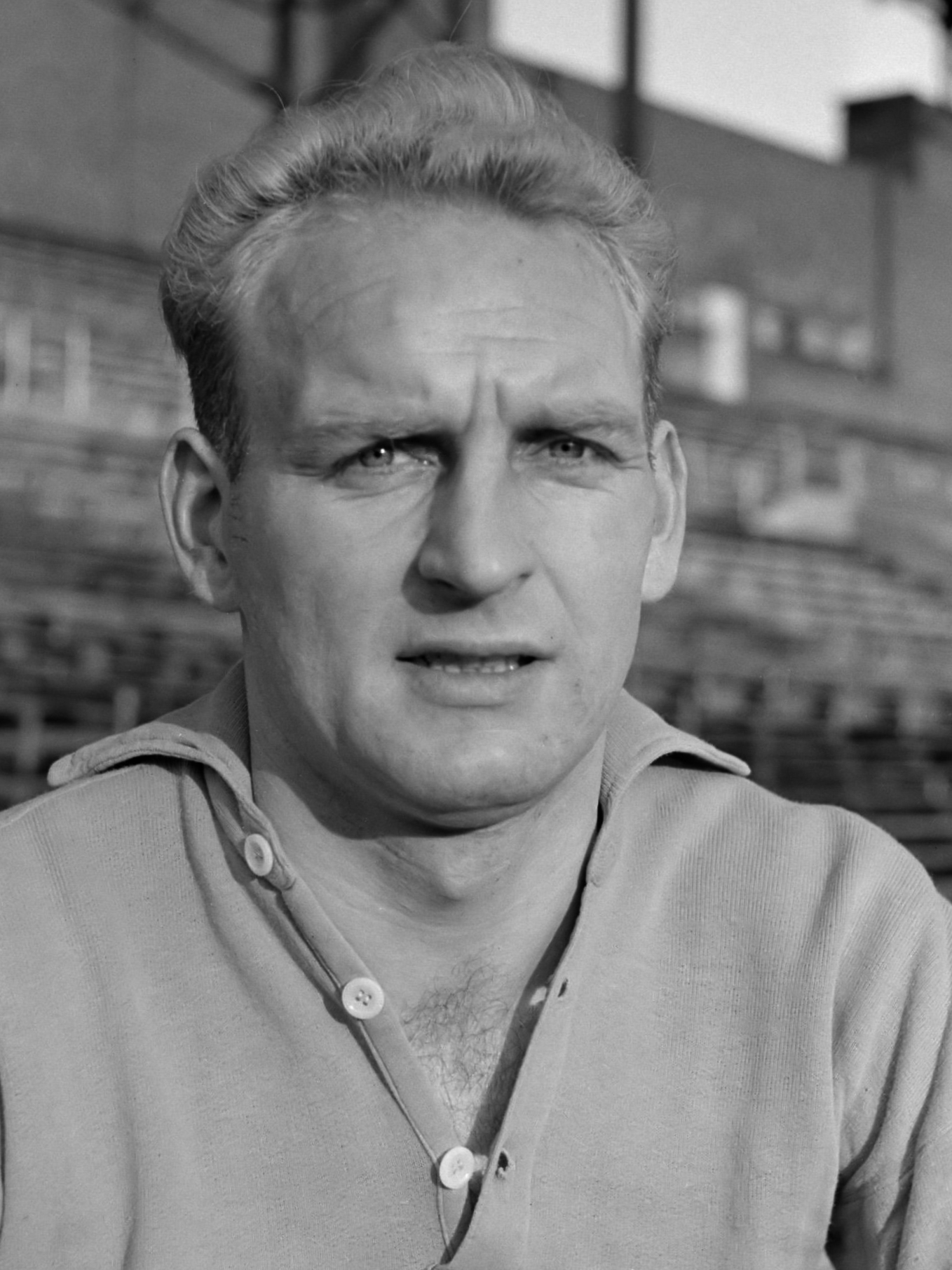
- Schijvenaar in 1951

Personal information
- Date of birth: 31 May 1918
- Place of birth: Haarlem, Netherlands
- Date of death: 17 September 1996 (aged 78)
- Place of death: Amsterdam, Netherlands

International career
Years	Team	Apps	(Gls)
	Netherlands	18	

Hendrik Schijvenaar (31 May 1918 – 17 September 1996) was a Dutch footballer. He competed in the men's tournament at the 1948 Summer Olympics.

He also played for the Netherlands national baseball team. He is one of three known athletes to represent the country in both baseball and football, along with the other two being Joop Odenthal and Cor Wilders.
