= Cor Wilders =

Dutch athlete (1916–1998)

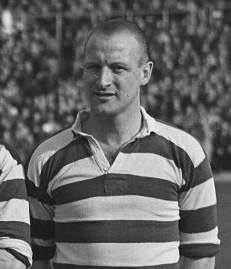
- Wilders with Blauw-Wit in 1950

Personal information
- Date of birth: 27 June 1916
- Date of death: 24 January 1998 (aged 81)
- Position: Defender

International career
Years	Team	Apps	(Gls)
1937–1946	Netherlands	8	(0)
Baseball career
Pitcher, infielder
Member of the Netherlands
Baseball Hall of Fame
Induction	1983

Cornelis "'Cor" 'Wilders (27 June 1916 – 24 January 1998) was a Dutch baseball and association football player.

As a footballer, Wilders played in eight matches for the Netherlands national football team from 1937 to 1946. He scored an own goal in a blowout loss to Belgium in 1940.

Wilders played baseball as a pitcher for Blauw-Wit Amsterdam and for the Netherlands national baseball team, becoming one of only three known athletes to represent the country in both baseball and football (the other two being Joop Odenthal and Henk Schijvenaar). He played second base for the Netherlands at the 1937 World Exhibition Games in Paris, where they took the championship.

After his playing career, he became the baseball manager of VVGA in Amsterdam in 1959.

Wilders was inducted into the Netherlands Baseball Hall of Fame in 1983.
