= Cas Odenthal =

Dutch footballer (born 2000)

Personal information
- Date of birth: 26 September 2000 (age 26)
- Place of birth: Leersum, Netherlands
- Height: 1.90 m (6 ft 3 in)
- Position: Centre-back

Team information
- Current team: Sassuolo
- Number: 26

Youth career
- –2018: FC Utrecht
- 2018–2019: NEC Nijmegen

Senior career*
Years	Team	Apps	(Gls)
2019–2022	NEC	63	(2)
2022–2024	Como	60	(2)
2024–	Sassuolo	25	(3)
2026	→ Bari (loan)	16	(1)

International career^{‡}
2015–2016	Netherlands U16	3	(0)
- * Club domestic league appearances and goals as of 14:57, 12 October 2026 (UTC) ‡ National team caps and goals as of 11 March 2016

Cas Odenthal (born 26 September 2000) is a Dutch professional footballer who plays as a centre-back for Serie A club Sassuolo.

== Early and personal life ==
Odenthal was born in and grew up in Leersum and is the grandson of former Dutch international footballer Joop Odenthal.

== Club career ==
After playing youth football for FC Utrecht, Odenthal signed for NEC Nijmegen in summer 2018. He made his debut for the club on 9 August 2019 in a 2–1 defeat to FC Eindhoven. In September 2019, Odenthal signed a contract with the club until summer 2021. In March 2021, his contract at the club was extended by a year. He made 29 appearances and scored one goal across the 2020–21 season as NEC were promoted to the Eredivisie.

On 26 July 2022, Odenthal signed a three-year contract with Como in Italy.

On 30 July 2024, Odenthal moved to Sassuolo in Serie B. He was a starter for most of the 2024–25 season, as Sassuolo was promoted to Serie A.

On 2 February 2026, Odenthal was loaned by Serie B club Bari.

== International career ==
Odenthal has represented the Netherlands at under-16 level.

== Career statistics ==
As of match played 11 October 2026

Appearances and goals by club, season and competition
Club	Season	League			National cup		Europe		Other		Total	
Club	Season	Division	Apps	Goals	Apps	Goals	Apps	Goals	Apps	Goals	Apps	Goals
NEC	2019–20	Eerste Divisie	6	0	0	0	—		—		6	0
NEC	2020–21	Eerste Divisie	29	1	2	0	—		3 (Note: Appearances in promotion play-offs)	1	34	2
NEC	2021–22	Eredivisie	28	1	4	0	—		—		32	1
NEC	Total		63	2	6	0	—		3	1	72	3
Como	2022–23	Serie B	30	0	0	0	—		—		30	0
Como	2023–24	Serie B	30	2	1	0	—		—		31	2
Como	Total		60	2	1	0	—		—		61	2
Sassuolo	2024–25	Serie B	22	1	3	0	—		—		25	1
Sassuolo	2025–26	Serie A	1	0	0	0	—		—		1	0
Sassuolo	2026–27	Serie A	2	2	2	0	—		—		4	2
Sassuolo	Total		25	3	5	0	—		—		30	3
Bari (loan)	2025–26	Serie B	16	1	—		—		2	0	18	1
Career total			164	8	12	0	0	0	5	1	181	9

== Honours ==
Sassuolo

- Serie B: 2024–25
