= Emanuele Rao =

Italian footballer (born 2006)

Personal information
- Date of birth: 28 March 2006 (age 20)
- Place of birth: Rovereto, Italy
- Height: 1.81 m (5 ft 11 in)
- Positions: Winger; attacking midfielder

Team information
- Current team: Pisa (on loan from Napoli)
- Number: 17

Youth career
- –2023: SPAL
- 2020–2021: → ChievoVerona (loan)

Senior career*
Years	Team	Apps	(Gls)
2023–2025	SPAL	64	(6)
2025–	Napoli	0	(0)
2025–2026	→ Bari (loan)	32	(6)
2026–	→ Pisa (loan)	8	(1)

International career^{‡}
2022–2023	Italy U17	12	(1)
2023	Italy U18	1	(0)
2024	Italy U19	2	(0)
2026–	Italy U20	4	(1)
2026–	Italy U21	1	(0)
- * Club domestic league appearances and goals as of 7 November 2026 ‡ National team caps and goals as of 3 October 2026

Emanuele Rao (born 28 March 2006) is an Italian professional footballer who plays as a winger or attacking midfielder for Serie B club Pisa, on loan from Napoli.

== Club career ==
=== SPAL ===
Born in Rovereto, Trentino-Alto Adige, Rao is a youth product of ChievoVerona and SPAL.

In September 2022, he signed his first professional contract with SPAL. Rao made his professional debut with SPAL in a 3–0 Serie C win over Perugia on 15 September 2023. The following month, he scored his first goal in a match against Lucchese, becoming at 17 years, 6 months and 13 days the second youngest scorer in the club's history. After a first promising season, he established himself as one of the best youngster in the league.

=== Napoli ===
In July 2025, after SPAL went bankrupt, he moved to Napoli in Serie A, from where he was straight loaned to Bari in Serie B for the 2025–26 season. By the spring 2026, despite Bari struggling on the field, Emanuele Rao was viewed as one of the most promising prospects of the Italian second tier, scoring 6 goals and delivering 2 assists in less than 3 months.

== International career ==
Rao is a youth international for Italy, having played for the under-17, under-18, under-19 and under-20.
