= Riccardo Burgio =

Italian footballer

Personal information
- Date of birth: 5 May 2001 (age 25)
- Place of birth: Magenta, Italy
- Height: 1.83 m (6 ft 0 in)
- Position: Midfielder

Team information
- Current team: Bari
- Number: 3

Youth career
- –2019: Inter Milan
- 2019–2020: Atalanta
- 2019–2020: → Inter Milan (loan)

Senior career*
Years	Team	Apps	(Gls)
2020–2022	Atalanta	0	(0)
2020–2021	→ Avellino (loan)	10	(1)
2021	→ Renate (loan)	11	(0)
2021–2022	→ Piacenza (loan)	6	(0)
2022	→ ACR Messina (loan)	1	(0)
2022–2023	Monterosi	14	(0)
2023–2024	Turris	16	(0)
2024–2025	Potenza	37	(0)
2025–	Bari	5	(0)
- * Club domestic league appearances and goals as of 2 March 2026

Riccardo Burgio (born 5 May 2001) is an Italian professional footballer who plays as a midfielder for Serie C Group C club Bari.

== Career ==
Born in Magenta, Lombardy, Burgio started his career in Inter Milan youth system, and in 2019 he joined Atalanta.

On 8 September 2020, he was loaned to Serie C club Avellino. Burgio made his professional debut on 3 October 2020 against Viterbese.

On 6 January 2021, he joined Serie C club Renate on loan.

On 20 July 2021, he was loaned to Piacenza for the 2021–22 season. On 28 January 2022, the loan was terminated early. On 29 January 2022, he joined ACR Messina on loan until the end of the season.

On 22 July 2022, Burgio signed with Monterosi.

On 15 July 2023, Burgio joined Turris on a one-season deal. On 31 January 2024, he moved to Potenza on a 1.5-year contract.

On 1 September 2025, Burgio signed a three-year contract with Bari in Serie B.
