= Daouda Traoré =

French footballer (born 2006)

Personal information
- Date of birth: 22 July 2006 (age 20)
- Place of birth: Ivry-sur-Seine, France
- Height: 1.86 m (6 ft 1 in)
- Position: Defensive midfielder

Team information
- Current team: Le Mans (on loan from Southampton)
- Number: 23

Youth career
- 2012–2016: ELAN Chevilly-Larue Football
- 2016–2018: Antony Sports
- 2018–2019: FC Montrouge 92
- 2019–2021: CFF Paris
- 2021–2022: Nice

Senior career*
Years	Team	Apps	(Gls)
2022–2024	Nice II	12	(1)
2024	Nice	1	(0)
2024–	Southampton	0	(0)
2024–2025	→ Valenciennes (loan)	27	(0)
2025–2026	→ Betis Deportivo (loan)	5	(0)
2026	→ Bari (loan)	9	(0)
2026–	→ Le Mans (loan)	4	(0)

International career
2022	France U16	7	(0)
2022–2023	France U17	12	(1)
Medal record
Men's football
Representing France
UEFA European Under-17 Championship
Runner-up	2023 Hungary
- * Club domestic league appearances and goals as of 06:09, 9 November 2026 (UTC)

Daouda Traoré (born 22 July 2006) is a French professional footballer who plays as a defensive midfielder for Ligue 1 club Le Mans, on loan from EFL Championship club Southampton.

== Club career ==
=== Nice ===
Born in Ivry-sur-Seine in the Ile-de-France, Traoré played at local clubs in the region before joining Nice youth team in 2021. Traoré made his senior debut with Nice's reserves team in the 2022–23 Championnat National 3. On 14 October 2022, he signed his first professional contract with Nice. On 8 February 2024, he made his professional debut in a 4–1 Coupe de France victory against Montpellier. Later that year, on 19 May, he made his Ligue 1 debut in a 2–2 away draw against Lille.

=== Southampton ===
On 30 August 2024, Traoré joined Premier League side Southampton and was subsequently sent on loan to Valenciennes for the 2024–25 season.

On 14 August 2025, he joined La Liga side Real Betis on a season-long loan. He was assigned to the reserve team Betis Deportivo in the third-tier Primera Federación. On 2 February 2026, Traoré moved to Serie B club Bari on loan, with an option to buy.

On 6 August 2026, he joined Ligue 1 club Le Mans on a season-long loan with an option to buy.

== International career ==
Traoré was born in France and is of Senegalese and Malian descent, holding triple nationality. He was called up to the France U17 squad for the 2023 UEFA European Under-17 Championship. He appeared in four matches during the tournament but didn't play in the final, as France was beaten by Germany in the penalty shootouts after a 0–0 draw in regular time.

== Career statistics ==
=== Club ===
As of match played 8 November 2026

Appearances and goals by club, season and competition
Club	Season	League			National cup (Note: Includes Coupe de France, FA Cup)		League cup (Note: Includes EFL Cup)		Other		Total	
Club	Season	Division	Apps	Goals	Apps	Goals	Apps	Goals	Apps	Goals	Apps	Goals
Nice II	2022–23	Championnat National 3	12	1	0	0	—		—		12	1
Nice	2023–24	Ligue 1	1	0	1	0	—		—		2	0
Southampton	2024–25	Premier League	0	0	0	0	0	0	—		0	0
Southampton	2025–26	Championship	0	0	0	0	0	0	—		0	0
Southampton	2026–27	Championship	0	0	0	0	0	0	—		0	0
Southampton	Total		0	0	0	0	0	0	0	0	0	0
Valenciennes (loan)	2024–25	Championnat National	27	0	4	0	—		0	0	31	0
Betis Deportivo (loan)	2025–26	Primera Federación	5	0	0	0	—		—		5	0
Bari (loan)	2025–26	Serie B	9	0	0	0	—		—		9	0
Le Mans (loan)	2026–27	Ligue 1	4	0	0	0	—		—		4	0
Career total			58	1	5	0	0	0	0	0	63	1

== Honours ==
France U17

- UEFA European Under-17 Championship runner-up: 2023
