= Gabriele Moncini =

Italian footballer

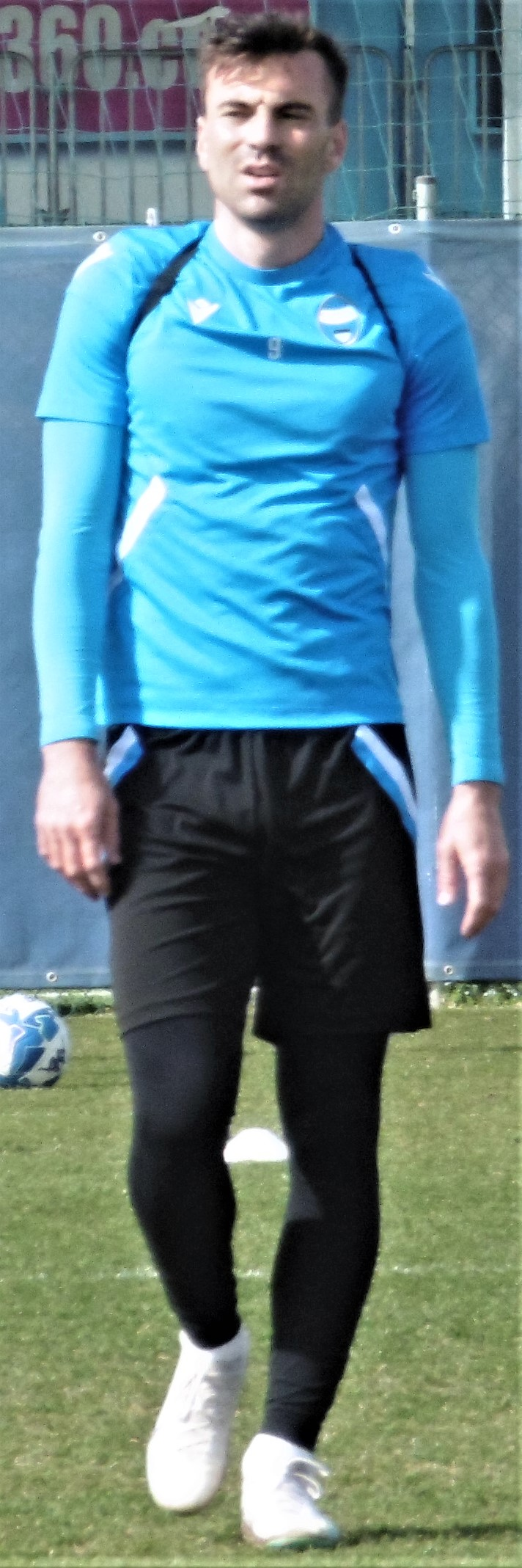

Personal information
- Date of birth: 26 April 1996 (age 30)
- Place of birth: Pistoia, Italy
- Height: 1.84 m (6 ft 0 in)
- Position: Forward

Team information
- Current team: Vicenza
- Number: 11

Youth career
- 2008–2011: Prato
- 2011–2013: Juventus

Senior career*
Years	Team	Apps	(Gls)
2013–2018	Cesena	40	(8)
2015–2017	→ Prato (loan)	55	(17)
2018–2019	SPAL	1	(0)
2019	Cittadella	22	(15)
2019–2020	SPAL	4	(0)
2020–2023	Benevento	53	(10)
2022–2023	→ SPAL (loan)	32	(9)
2023–2025	Brescia	59	(16)
2025–2026	Bari	37	(11)
2026–	Vicenza	1	(0)

International career^{‡}
2011–2012	Italy U16	4	(1)
2012	Italy U17	2	(0)
2019	Italy U21	2	(0)
- * Club domestic league appearances and goals as of 21 August 2026 ‡ National team caps and goals as of 25 March 2019

Gabriele Moncini (born 26 April 1996) is an Italian footballer who plays as a forward for Serie B club Vicenza.

== Career ==
Born in Pistoia, Tuscany, Moncini and Niccolò Arcangioli were signed by Piedmontese club Juventus in 2011, initially in temporary deal from Tuscan club Prato.

In June 2012 Juventus signed Moncini outright, for €200,000. Moncini was the member of Allievi U17 team from 2011 to 2013. In August 2013 he was signed by Serie B club Cesena in a temporary deal.

Moncini was a member of Cesena's reserve in 2013–14 season. He also made his first team debut in Serie B on 8 November 2013. On 30 January 2014 Cesena signed Moncini in co-ownership deal, with Stefano Pellizzari moved to opposite direction. Both 50% registration rights of the players were valued for €1 million.

On 18 June 2014 Moncini joined Cesena outright for €750,000, as well as Pellizzari to Juventus outright for €750,000.

On 7 January 2016 Moncini was signed by Prato in a temporary deal. At the start of 2016–17 season Moncini briefly played for Cesena in pre-season friendly. However, on 4 August 2016 Moncini returned to Prato.

On 13 July 2017 Moncini signed a new four-year contract. On 25 July 2018, Moncini signed with Serie A club SPAL for free. On 23 January 2019, Moncini signed with Cittadella. On 23 February 2019 he scored a hat-trick against Lecce. On 2 July 2019, Moncini returned to SPAL.

On 7 January 2020, Moncini signed to Serie B club Benevento until 30 June 2023, with an option for another year. On 16 July 2022, he returned to SPAL once again, on loan with an obligation to buy. On 31 August 2023, Moncini moved to Brescia.

On 9 July 2025, Moncini joined Bari with a two-season contract.
