= Michele Cerofolini =

Italian footballer (born 1999)

Personal information
- Date of birth: 4 January 1999 (age 27)
- Place of birth: Arezzo, Italy
- Height: 1.91 m (6 ft 3 in)
- Position: Goalkeeper

Team information
- Current team: Bari
- Number: 31

Youth career
- –2018: Fiorentina

Senior career*
Years	Team	Apps	(Gls)
2017–2023	Fiorentina	5	(0)
2018–2019	→ Cosenza (loan)	5	(0)
2019	→ Bisceglie (loan)	17	(0)
2020	→ Casertana (loan)	10	(0)
2020–2021	→ Reggiana (loan)	19	(0)
2022	→ Alessandria (loan)	1	(0)
2023–2025	Frosinone	44	(0)
2025–	Bari	37	(0)

International career^{‡}
2017	Italy U18	5	(0)
2017–2018	Italy U19	8	(0)
2018–2019	Italy U20	10	(0)
2020	Italy U21	6	(0)
- * Club domestic league appearances and goals as of 12 May 2026 ‡ National team caps and goals as of 19:40, 18 November 2020 (UTC)

Michele Cerofolini (born 4 January 1999) is an Italian professional footballer who plays as a goalkeeper for Serie C Group C club Bari.

== Club career ==
=== Fiorentina ===
Cerofolini is a product of Fiorentina youth teams and started playing for their Under-19 squad in the 2015–16 season at the age of 17. He started making bench appearances for Fiorentina's senior squad in the 2016–17 Serie A season. On 23 August 2017, he made his first appearance for Fiorentina's senior squad, coming on as an 87th-minute substitute for Bartłomiej Drągowski (becoming Fiorentina's third goalkeeper of the game) in a friendly Trofeo Santiago Bernabéu matchup against Real Madrid. In 2017–18 season, he appeared on the bench in most of the Serie A games for Fiorentina, but did not play in any, remaining a backup to Marco Sportiello and Dragowski.

=== Loan moves ===
On 13 July 2018, Cerofolini joined Serie B club Cosenza on a season-long loan. He made his professional debut in Serie B for Cosenza on 26 September 2018 in a 2–0 away defeat against Cremonese. One month later, on 30 October, he played his second match for the club, a 1–1 home draw against Pescara. However, in January 2019, his loan was interrupted and he returned to Fiorentina leaving Cosenza with only these 2 appearances, remaining an unused substitute for 17 times during the loan, here he was the third goalkeeper after Pietro Perina and Umberto Saracco.

On 25 January 2019, Cerofolini moved on another loan, to Serie C club Bisceglie. Two days later, on 27 January, he made his debut in a 1–0 home defeat against Viterbese Castrense. Two weeks later, on 10 February, he kept his first clean sheet for the team in a 0–0 home draw against Trapani and two more weeks later, on 24 February, he kept his second in a 0–0 away draw against Paganese. He became Bisceglie's first-choice in the second part of the season. Cerofolini ended his six-month loan to Bisceglie with 13 appearances, 11 goals conceded and 6 clean sheets.

After appearing on the bench three times for Fiorentina in November and December 2019, on 9 January 2020 he joined Serie C club Casertana on loan. Three days later, on 12 January, he made his debut for the club in a 2–2 away draw against Rende. Ten more days later, on 22 January, Cerofolini kept his first clean sheet for Casertana in a 0–0 home draw against Potenza. On 9 February he kept his second clean sheet in a 0–0 home draw against Bisceglie. Cerofolini ended his six-month loan to Casertana with eight appearances, eight goals conceded and two clean sheet.

On 20 August 2020, Cerofolini was loaned to newly promoted Serie B club Reggiana on loan for the 2020–21 season.

On 28 January 2022, he joined Alessandria on loan.

=== Return to Fiorentina ===
At the end of the loan he returned to Fiorentina, and he made his Serie A debut for the club on 30 April 2023 in a 5–0 home win against Sampdoria.

=== Frosinone ===
On 14 August 2023, Cerofolini signed a three-year contract with Frosinone.

=== Bari ===
On 9 July 2025, Cerofolini moved to Bari on a three-season deal.

== International career ==
Cerofolini was first chosen to represent his country when he was called up to Italy national under-18 football team for a series of friendlies in February 2017.

Later in the same year he began to be called up to the Under-19 squad, and eventually was included in Italy's roster for the 2018 UEFA European Under-19 Championship, in which Italy was the runner-up to Portugal. He did not make any appearances at the tournament, serving as back-up to Alessandro Plizzari.

In the fall of 2018 he was included in Italy's Under-20 squad and played in 2018–19 Under 20 Elite League games.

On 13 October 2020, he made his debut with the Italy U21 playing as a starter in a qualifying match won 2–0 against Republic of Ireland in Pisa.

== Career statistics ==
=== Club ===
As of 8 July 2020

Appearances and goals by club, season and competition
Club	Season	League			Cup		Europe		Other		Total	
Club	Season	League	Apps	Goals	Apps	Goals	Apps	Goals	Apps	Goals	Apps	Goals
Cosenza (loan)	2018–19	Serie B	5	0	0	0	—		—		5	0
Bisceglie (loan)	2018–19	Serie C	17	0	—		—		—		17	0
Casertana (loan)	2019–20	Serie C	10	0	—		—		—		10	0
Reggiana (loan)	2020-21	Serie B	19	0								
Alessandria (loan)	2021-22	Serie B	2	0								
Fiorentina	2022-23	Serie A	4	0								
Career total			57	0	0	0	—		—		23	0

== Honours ==
Fiorentina

- Coppa Italia runner-up: 2022–23
- UEFA Europa Conference League runner-up: 2022–23

Italy U19

- UEFA European Under-19 Championship runner-up: 2018
