= Indrit Mavraj =

Kosovan footballer (born 2006)

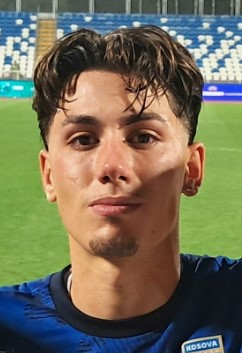
- Mavraj with Kosovo U21 in 2025

Personal information
- Date of birth: 23 January 2006 (age 20)
- Height: 1.95 m (6 ft 5 in)
- Position: Centre-back

Team information
- Current team: Lechia Gdańsk
- Number: 76

Youth career
- FC Effretikon
- Winterthur
- 2022–2024: Schaffhausen
- 2024: Genoa
- 2024–2026: Bari

Senior career*
Years	Team	Apps	(Gls)
2025–2026	Bari	1	(0)
2026–	Lechia Gdańsk	2	(0)

International career^{‡}
2023–2024	Kosovo U19	5	(0)
2025–	Kosovo U21	4	(0)
- * Club domestic league appearances and goals as of 10:55, 10 November 2026 (UTC) ‡ National team caps and goals as of 18:17, 16 November 2026 (UTC)

Indrit Mavraj (born 23 January 2006) is a Kosovan professional footballer who plays as a centre-back for I liga club Lechia Gdańsk.

== Club career ==
=== Early career and Genoa ===
Mavraj began his youth career with FC Effretikon, then joined Winterthur and Schaffhausen, before joining the youth academy of Serie A side Genoa in February 2024. He was first named as a substitute on 19 February in a match against Atalanta, and made his debut five days later in a 2–2 away draw against Roma, coming on as a substitute in the 79th minute in place of Oumar Barry.

=== Bari ===
In July 2024, Mavraj joined the under-19 team of Serie A club Bari, which competed in the Campionato Primavera 2. His debut with Bari U19 came on 15 September against Monopoli after being named in the starting line-up.

On 17 August 2025, Mavraj was named as a first team substitute for the first time in the 2025–26 Coppa Italia first round against AC Milan. His debut with first team came on 26 October against Mantova after coming on as a substitute in the 81st minute in place of Andrea Meroni.

=== Lechia Gdańsk ===
On 21 January 2026, Mavraj signed a four-and-a-half-year contract with Polish Ekstraklasa club Lechia Gdańsk.

== International career ==
=== Under-19 ===
In June 2023, Mavraj becomes part of Kosovo U19 with which he made his debut in a 0–1 away defeat against Albania after coming on as a substitute. His competitive debut with Kosovo U19 came on 13 November 2024 after an absence of almost a year in a UEFA Euro 2024 qualifying against Austria after being named in the starting line-up.

=== Under-21 ===
On 30 August 2025, Mavraj received a call-up from Kosovo U21 for the UEFA Euro 2027 qualification matches against Romania and Spain. His debut with Kosovo U21 came ten days later in the UEFA Euro 2027 qualification against Spain after being named in the starting line-up.

== Personal life ==
Mavraj was born in Switzerland to Albanian parents from the village Saradran of Istog, Kosovo. He is the cousin of former Albanian international Mërgim Mavraj.
