= Valerio Mantovani =

Italian footballer

Personal information
- Date of birth: 18 July 1996 (age 30)
- Place of birth: Rome, Italy
- Height: 1.80 m (5 ft 11 in)
- Position: Centre-back

Team information
- Current team: Bari
- Number: 13

Youth career
- 2006–2013: Roma
- 2013–2015: Torino

Senior career*
Years	Team	Apps	(Gls)
2015–2016	Torino	0	(0)
2016–2023	Salernitana	75	(0)
2021–2022	→ Alessandria (loan)	21	(1)
2022–2023	→ Ternana (loan)	30	(1)
2023–2024	Ternana	15	(0)
2024–2025	Ascoli	16	(1)
2024–2025	→ Bari (loan)	33	(1)
2025–2026	Mantova	7	(0)
2026–	Bari	14	(0)
- * Club domestic league appearances and goals as of 12 May 2026

Valerio Mantovani (born 18 July 1996) is an Italian professional footballer who plays as a central defender for Serie C Group C club Bari.

== Club career ==
He began his youth career with A.S.D. Atletico 2000, then Roma. In 2013, he signed with Torino, winning the Campionato Berretti that season. The following year, he captained the Primavera youth team, winning the Campionato Nazionale Primavera and Supercoppa Primavera.

In July 2016, he was signed by Serie B club Salernitana. He made his professional debut in the Serie B on 26 August 2016 in a game against Spezia.

On 1 September 2022, Mantovani joined Ternana on loan. On 8 August 2023, Mantovani returned to Ternana on a permanent basis and signed a three-year contract.

On 29 January 2024, Mantovani moved to Ascoli. On 7 August 2024, he joined Bari on loan.

On 25 July 2025, Mantovani signed a three-season contract with Mantova.

On 2 February 2026, Mantovani returned to Bari with a two-and-a-half-year contract.

== Honours ==
Torino

- Campionato Nazionale Dante Berretti: 2013–14
- Campionato Primavera: 2014–15
- Supercoppa Primavera: 2015
