= Kevin Piscopo =

Italian footballer (born 1998)

Personal information
- Date of birth: 6 February 1998 (age 28)
- Place of birth: Vercelli, Italy
- Height: 1.81 m (5 ft 11 in)
- Position: Forward

Team information
- Current team: Juve Stabia

Youth career
- –2014: Santhià
- 2013–2014: → Genoa (loan)
- 2014–2016: Genoa

Senior career*
| Years | Team | Apps | (Gls) |
| 2016–2019 | Genoa | 0 | (0) |
| 2016–2017 | → Montecatini (loan) | 33 | (13) |
| 2017–2018 | → Carrarese (loan) | 20 | (3) |
| 2018–2019 | → Carrarese (loan) | 34 | (8) |
| 2019–2022 | Empoli | 5 | (0) |
| 2020 | → Carrarese (loan) | 5 | (0) |
| 2020–2021 | → Carrarese (loan) | 36 | (6) |
| 2021–2022 | → SPAL (loan) | 2 | (0) |
| 2022 | → Renate (loan) | 19 | (1) |
| 2022–2023 | Pordenone | 36 | (3) |
| 2023– | Juve Stabia | 87 | (7) |
| 2026 | → Bari (loan) | 13 | (3) |
- * Club domestic league appearances and goals as of 12 May 2026

Kevin Piscopo (born 6 February 1998) is an Italian professional footballer who plays as a forward for Serie B club Juve Stabia.

== Club career ==
=== Genoa ===
Born in Vercelli, Piscopo was a youth exponent of Genoa.

==== Loan to Montecatini ====
On 31 August 2016, Piscopo was signed by Serie D club Montecatini on a season-long loan. On 4 September, Piscopo made his debut in Serie D and he scored his first goal for Montecatini and the winning goal in the 51st minute of a 1–0 away win over Argentina Arma, he was replaced after the 71 minutes. On 11 September he played his first entire match for Montecatini, a 2–2 home draw against Ponsacco. On 2 October, Piscopo scored his second goal in the 45th minute of a 3–1 away win over Sestri Levante. On 13 November he scored his third goal in the 86th minute of a 1–1 home draw against Gavorrano. On 16 November, Piscopo made his first hat-trick in his career, in a 3–2 away win over Sporting Recco. On 9 April 2017 he scored his tenth goal in the 29th minute of a 3–2 away defeat against Lavagnese. Piscopo ended his season-long loan to Montecatini with 33 appearances and 13 goals.

==== Loan to Carrarese ====
On 20 July 2017, Piscopo was loaned to Serie C club Carrarese on a season-long loan deal. On 27 August he made his Serie C debut for Carrarese in a 1–0 away win over Cuneo, he played the entire match. On 10 September, Piscopo scored his first goal for Carrarese, as a substitute, in the 72nd minute of a 4–3 away defeat against Viterbese Castrense. On 4 October he scored his second goal in the 40th minute of a 5–2 away win over Prato. On 21 April 2018 he scored his third goal, as a substitute, in the 75th minute of a 1–1 home draw against Pistoiese. Piscopo ended his season-long loan to Carrarese with 21 appearances and 3 goals.

On 12 July 2018 he returned on loan to Carrarese for another season. On 29 July he started his second season with Carrarese as a substitute replacing Tommaso Biasci in the 71st minute of a 1–0 home defeat against Imolese in the first round of Coppa Italia. On 16 September he played his first Serie C match of the season as a substitute replacing Tommaso Biasci in the 46th minute of a 5–1 away win over Arzachena. One week later, on 23 September, he scored twice in a 4–0 home win over Juventus U23. On 27 September he scored his third goal, as a substitute, in the 85th minute of a 2–2 away draw against Lucchese. Three days later, on 30 September, he played his first entire match of the season, a 2–1 home win over Pro Patria. Piscopo ended his second loan to Carrarese with 38 appearances, 9 goals and 6 assists.

=== Empoli ===
On 8 July 2019, Piscopo signed to Serie B side Empoli. On 5 October he made his debut for the club as a substitute replacing Stefano Moreo in the 75th minute of a 2–0 away defeat against Pordenone. Two weeks later, on 20 October, he played his first entire match for the club, a 1–1 home draw against Cremonese.

==== Loans to Carrarese ====
On 15 January 2020, he joined Carrarese once again on loan until the end of the season. Four days later, on 19 January, Piscopo made his league debut for the club as a substitute replacing Cassio Cardoselli in the 66th minute of a 3–1 home win over Robur Siena. On 17 July he scored his first goal of the season, as a substitute, in the 92nd minute of a 2–1 away defeat after extra-time in the play-off semi-final against Bari. Piscopo ended his 6-month loan to Carrarese with 7 appearances, all as a substitute, including 2 in the play-off matches, and 1 goal. After appearing for Empoli as a late substitute in their 2020–21 Serie B opening game against Frosinone and, also as a substitute, in the Coppa Italia game against Renate, on 5 October 2020 he was loaned to Carrarese once again.

==== Loans to SPAL and Renate ====
On 31 August 2021, he joined SPAL on loan. On 19 January 2022, he moved on a new loan to Serie C club Renate. Renate will hold an obligation to purchase his rights if the club gets promoted to Serie B for the 2022–23 season.

=== Pordenone ===
On 1 July 2022, Piscopo joined Pordenone on a three-year contract.

=== Juve Stabia ===
On 19 July 2023, Piscopo signed a two-year contract with Juve Stabia.

On 31 January 2026, he was loaned by Bari, with a conditional obligation to buy.

== Career statistics ==
=== Club ===
As of 10 August 2020

| Club | Season | League | | | Cup | | Europe | | Other | | Total | |
| Club | Season | League | Apps | Goals | Apps | Goals | Apps | Goals | Apps | Goals | Apps | Goals |
|---|---|---|---|---|---|---|---|---|---|---|---|---|
| Montecatini (loan) | 2016–17 | Serie D | 33 | 13 | — | | — | | — | | 33 | 13 |
| Carrarese (loan) | 2017–18 | Serie C | 20 | 3 | 0 | 0 | — | | 1 (Note: All appearance(s) in Serie C play-off.) | 0 | 21 | 3 |
| Carrarese (loan) | 2018–19 | Serie C | 34 | 8 | 1 | 0 | — | | 3 | 1 | 38 | 9 |
| Total Carrarese | | | 54 | 11 | 1 | 0 | | | 4 | 1 | 59 | 12 |
| Empoli | 2019–20 | Serie B | 4 | 0 | 1 | 0 | — | | — | | 5 | 0 |
| Carrarese (loan) | 2019–20 | Serie C | 5 | 0 | — | | — | | 2 | 1 | 7 | 1 |
| Career total | | | 96 | 24 | 2 | 0 | — | | 6 | 2 | 104 | 26 |
