= Giacomo Stabile =

Italian footballer (born 2005)

Personal information
- Date of birth: 12 April 2005 (age 21)
- Place of birth: Milan, Italy
- Height: 1.87 m (6 ft 2 in)
- Position: Defender

Team information
- Current team: Südtirol (on loan from Inter Milan)
- Number: 27

Youth career
- –2015: Enotria
- 2015–2024: Inter Milan

Senior career*
Years	Team	Apps	(Gls)
2024–	Inter Milan	0	(0)
2024–2025	→ Alcione (loan)	26	(0)
2025–2026	→ Juve Stabia (loan)	13	(0)
2026	→ Bari (loan)	3	(0)
2026–	→ Südtirol (loan)	0	(0)

International career^{‡}
2024–	Italy U19	1	(1)
2024–	Italy U20	1	(0)
2026–	Italy U21	1	(0)
- * Club domestic league appearances and goals as of 12 May 2026 ‡ National team caps and goals as of 8 June 2026

Giacomo Stabile (born 12 April 2005) is an Italian footballer who plays as a defender for Serie B club Südtirol, on loan from Inter Milan.

== Early life ==
Stabile joined the youth academy of Italian Serie A side Inter at the age of nine.

== Career ==
Stabile started his senior career with Inter Milan.

On 11 July 2024, Stabile joined Serie C club Alcione on a season-long loan.

On 5 August 2025, Stabile joined Serie B side Juve Stabia on loan.

On 8 January 2026, Stabile's loan spell with Juve Stabia was terminated as he joined fellow Serie B side Bari on a six-month loan.

On 9 July 2026, Stabile moved to Südtirol on a season-long loan.

== Style of play ==
Stabile mainly operates as a defender and is left-footed.

== Personal life ==
Stabile has regarded Italy international Alessandro Bastoni as his football idol.

== Honours ==
Inter Milan

- Supercoppa Italiana: 2023
