= Giacomo De Pieri =

Italian footballer (born 2006)

Personal information
- Date of birth: 29 December 2006 (age 19)
- Place of birth: Casale sul Sile, Italy
- Height: 1.74 m (5 ft 9 in)
- Position: Winger

Team information
- Current team: Ascoli (on loan from Inter Milan)
- Number: 21

Youth career
- 2011–2016: Casale ASD
- 2016–2020: ASD Liventina
- 2020–2025: Inter Milan

Senior career*
Years	Team	Apps	(Gls)
2025–	Inter Milan	0	(0)
2025–2026	→ Juve Stabia (loan)	6	(1)
2026	→ Bari (loan)	10	(0)
2026–	→ Ascoli (loan)	0	(0)

International career^{‡}
2021	Italy U16	7	(1)
2023	Italy U17	6	(1)
2023–2024	Italy U18	3	(0)
2024–	Italy U19	4	(1)
2024–	Italy U20	2	(0)
- * Club domestic league appearances and goals as of 12 May 2026 ‡ National team caps and goals as of 15:54, 31 January 2025 (UTC)

Giacomo De Pieri (born 29 December 2006) is an Italian professional footballer who plays as a winger for Serie B club Ascoli, on loan from Inter Milan.

== Career ==
A youth product of his hometown club Casale ASD since the age of 5, De Pieri moved to ASD Liventina, before finishing his development at Inter Milan in 2020. He made his first appearance with the matchday squad of Inter in a Serie A match against Empoli FC on 19 January 2025. He made his senior debut with Inter Milan as a substitute in a 3–0 UEFA Champions League win over Monaco on 29 January 2025.

On 24 July 2025, De Pieri joined Serie B side Juve Stabia on a season-long loan.

On 8 January 2026, De Pieri's loan spell with Juve Stabia was terminated as he joined fellow Serie B side Bari on a six-month loan.

On 6 July 2026, De Pieri was loaned to newly promoted Serie B club Ascoli.

== International career ==
De Pieri is a youth international for Italy, and made the squad of the Italy U17s for the 2023 UEFA European Under-17 Championship. He was called up to the Italy U20s in September 2024 at the age of 17 for a set of Under 20 Elite League matches.

== Playing style ==
De Pieri is a left-footed winger who plays on the right, and is known quality and technique, dribbling skills, and curling shots, as well as ability to playmake. He is a fan and models his playstyle after the English footballer Phil Foden.
