= Andrea Meroni =

Italian footballer (born 1997)

Personal information
- Date of birth: 9 January 1997 (age 29)
- Place of birth: Empoli, Italy
- Height: 1.88 m (6 ft 2 in)
- Position: Defender

Team information
- Current team: Mantova (on loan from Bari)
- Number: 13

Youth career
- –2016: Empoli

Senior career*
Years	Team	Apps	(Gls)
2016–2017	Empoli	0	(0)
2016–2017	→ Cosenza (loan)	4	(0)
2017–2018	Paganese	21	(0)
2018–2019	Pisa	34	(0)
2018	→ Paganese (loan)	11	(0)
2019–2022	Sassuolo	0	(0)
2019–2021	→ Pisa (loan)	27	(0)
2021–2022	→ Cremonese (loan)	8	(0)
2022–2024	Cosenza	46	(1)
2024–2025	Reggiana	36	(0)
2025–	Bari	12	(0)
2026–	→ Mantova (loan)	8	(2)
- * Club domestic league appearances and goals as of 13 May 2026

Andrea Meroni (born 9 January 1997) is an Italian football player who plays for Serie B club Mantova on loan from Bari.

== Club career ==
=== Empoli ===
He spent his youth career with Empoli. He did not appear for the club's senior squad.

==== Loan to Cosenza ====
On 30 July 2016 he joined Lega Pro club Cosenza on loan.

He made his professional Lega Pro debut for Cosenza on 6 November 2016 in a game against Casertana. He started the game and played the whole match. He finished the loan with 4 appearances for Cosenza, 2 of them as a starter.

=== Paganese ===
On 28 July 2017 he signed a 3-year contract with Serie C club Paganese.

=== Pisa ===
==== Loan to Paganese ====
On 31 January 2018 his rights were acquired by Serie C club Pisa, who then loaned him back to Paganese for the remainder of the 2017–18 season.

=== Sassuolo ===
==== Loan to Pisa ====
On 31 July 2019 his rights were acquired by Serie A club Sassuolo, who then loaned him back to Pisa on a 2-year term.

Pisa was promoted to Serie B for the 2019–20 season and Meroni made his debut in the second tier on 15 September 2019 in a game against Cremonese. He started the game and played for 72 minutes before being substituted.

==== Loan to Cremonese ====
On 31 August 2021 he joined Cremonese on loan.

=== Return to Cosenza ===
On 26 July 2022, Meroni returned to Cosenza on a two-year contract.

=== Reggiana ===
On 5 July 2024, Meroni signed a two-year contract with Reggiana.

=== Bari ===
On 1 September 2025, Meroni moved to Bari on a two-season deal. On 2 February 2026, Meroni moved to Mantova on loan, with Mantova holding an obligation to buy if they avoid relegation from Serie B.
