= 2025–26 US Catanzaro 1929 season =

US Catanzaro 1929
- President: Floriano Noto
- Manager: Alberto Aquilani
- Stadium: Stadio Nicola Ceravolo
- Serie B: 5th
- Promotion play-offs: Finalist
- Coppa Italia: Round of 32
- Top goalscorer: League: Filippo Pittarello (12); All: Pietro Iemmello (13)
- Highest home attendance: 12,125 vs. Sudtirol (25 August 2025)
- Lowest home attendance: 6,202 vs. Spezia (25 April 2026)
- Average home league attendance: 8,737
- Biggest win: Catanzaro 3–0 Avellino
- Biggest defeat: Frosinone 2–0 Catanzaro
- All statistics correct as of 16 June 2025.

The 2025–26 season is the 97th in the history of Unione Sportiva Catanzaro 1929 and the club's third consecutive season in Serie B. In addition to its domestic league participation, Catanzaro competed in the Coppa Italia, where it was eliminated in the first round by Sassuolo. On 18 June 2025, Alberto Aquilani was appointed as the team's head coach. Catanzaro finished fifth on league ladder after the regular season, qualifying for the promotion play-offs. They defeated Avellino in the quarter-finals before beating Palermo 3–2 on aggregate in the semi-finals. They drew with Monza in the play-off final 2–2 on aggregate. However, Monza were promoted to the Serie A as they were the highest placed team, thus Catanzaro were to continue to play in Serie B for the 2026–27 season.

== Squad ==
=== Transfers in ===
Pos.	Player	Transferred from	Fee	Date	Source
FW	(Italy) Nicolò Buso	(Italy) Lecco	Undisclosed	1 July 2025	
DF	(Albania) Ervin Bashi	(Italy) Pro Patria	Undisclosed	10 July 2025	
MF	(Italy) Patrick Nuamah	(Italy) Sassuolo	Loan	19 July 2025	
MF	(Italy) Fabio Rispoli	(Italy) Como	Loan	20 July 2025	
DF	(Italy) Gianluca Di Chiara	(Italy) Frosinone	Free	22 July 2025	
DF	(Italy) Davide Bettella	(Italy) Frosinone	Free	30 July 2025	
MF	(Italy) Alphadjo Cissè	(Italy) Hellas Verona	Loan	1 August 2025	
MF	(Italy) Mattia Liberali	(Italy) AC Milan	Free	8 August 2025	
FW	(Italy) Luca Pandolfi	(Italy) Cittadella	Loan	30 August 2025	
MF	(Italy) Federico Di Francesco	(Italy) Palermo	Loan	30 August 2025	
MF	(Italy) Davide Buglio	(Italy) Juve Stabia	Loan	1 September 2025	
MF	(France) Rémi Oudin	(Italy) Lecce	Undisclosed	1 September 2025	
DF	(Italy) Tommaso Cassandro	(Italy) Como	Loan	1 September 2025	

=== Transfers out ===
Pos.	Player	Transferred to	Fee	Date	Source
DF	(Italy) Tommaso Cassandro	(Italy) Como	Loan return	30 June 2025	
FW	(Italy) Andrea La Mantia	(Italy) SPAL	Loan return	30 June 2025	
MF	(Italy) Mattia Compagnon	(Italy) Juventus Next Gen	Loan return	30 June 2025	
DF	(Croatia) Mario Šitum	(Croatia) Lokomotiva Zagreb		1 July 2025	
MF	(Belgium) Jari Vandeputte	(Italy) Cremonese	Undisclosed	1 July 2025	
MF	(Greece) Ilias Koutsoupias	(Italy) Frosinone	Undisclosed	1 July 2025	
MF	(Senegal) Mamadou Coulibaly	(Italy) Südtirol	Free	1 July 2025	
DF	(Italy) Umberto Morleo	(Italy) Bra	Loan	25 July 2025	
DF	(Italy) Marcello Piras	(Italy) Sorrento	Loan	1 August 2025	
MF	(Italy) Francesco Maiolo	(Italy) Cavese	Loan	5 August 2025	
FW	(Italy) Gabriel Rafele	(Italy) Ragusa	Free	27 August 2025	
FW	(Italy) Tommaso Biasci	(Italy) Avellino	Undisclosed	1 September 2025	

== Friendlies ==
26 July 2026	Napoli	2–1	Catanzaro	Naples
18:00 UTC+2

== Competitions ==
=== Overall record ===
Competition	First match	Last match	Starting round	Final position	Record							
Competition	First match	Last match	Starting round	Final position	Pld	W	D	L	GF	GA	GD	Win %
Serie B	24 August 2025	8 May 2026	Matchday 1	5th	38	15	14	9	62	51	+11	39.47
Serie B Promotion play-offs	12 May 2026	28 May 2026	Quarter-finals	Finalist	5	2	1	2	6	4	+2	40.00
Coppa Italia	15 August 2025		First round	First round	1	0	0	1	0	1	−1	0.00
Total					44	17	15	12	68	56	+12	38.64

Last updated: 16 June 2026
Source: worldfootball.net

=== Serie B ===
==== League table ====
Pos	Team	Pld	W	D	L	GF	GA	GD	Pts	Promotion, qualification or relegation
3	Monza (O, P)	38	22	10	6	61	32	+29	76	Qualification for promotion play-offs semi-finals
4	Palermo	38	20	12	6	61	33	+28	72	Qualification for promotion play-offs semi-finals
5	Catanzaro	38	15	14	9	62	51	+11	59	Qualification for promotion play-offs preliminary round
6	Modena	38	15	10	13	49	36	+13	55	Qualification for promotion play-offs preliminary round
7	Juve Stabia	38	11	18	9	44	45	−1	51	Qualification for promotion play-offs preliminary round

Source: Serie BKT
Rules for classification: 1) Points; 2) Head-to-head points; 3) Head-to-head goal difference; 4) Goal difference; 5) Goals scored; 6) Draw.
(Note: Head-to-head record is used only after all the matches between the teams in question have been played)
(O) Play-off winners; (P) Promoted

==== Results summary ====
Overall								Home						Away					
Pld	W	D	L	GF	GA	GD	Pts	W	D	L	GF	GA	GD	W	D	L	GF	GA	GD
38	15	14	9	62	51	+11	59	9	8	2	34	23	+11	6	6	7	28	28	0

Last updated: Complete.
Source: worldfootball.net

==== Results by round ====
Round	1	2	3	4	5	6	7	8	9	10	11	12	13	14	15	16	17	18	19	20	21	22	23	24	25	26	27	28	29	30	31	32	33	34	35	36	37	38
Ground	H	A	H	A	H	A	A	H	H	A	H	A	H	H	A	H	A	H	A	A	H	A	H	A	H	A	H	A	H	A	H	A	H	A	A	H	A	H
Result	D	D	D	D	D	D	L	L	W	W	W	L	D	W	W	W	W	W	L	L	D	L	W	W	W	W	D	D	W	W	D	L	D	D	D	W	L	L
Position	9	13	13	14	12	12	14	15	15	12	8	11	11	8	7	7	7	5	5	7	8	8	6	5	5	5	5	5	5	5	5	5	5	5	5	5	5	5

Source: WorldFootball.net
A = Away; H = Home; W = Win; D = Draw; L = Loss

==== Matches ====
24 August 2025 1	Catanzaro	1–1	Südtirol	Catanzaro
20:00 UTC+2	Iemmello 61'		Kofler 13', (yellow card) 90+3'; El Kaouakibi (yellow card) 42'	Stadium: Stadio Nicola Ceravolo; Attendance: 12,125; Referee: Claudio Giuseppe Allegretta

30 August 2025 2	Spezia	0–0	Catanzaro	La Spezia
20:00 UTC+2			Cissè (yellow card) 6'; Frosinini (yellow card) 81'; Pittarello (yellow card) 90+5'	Stadium: Stadio Alberto Picco; Attendance: 9,345; Referee: Antonio Rapuano

13 September 2025 3	Catanzaro	1–1	Carrarese	Catanzaro
16:15 UTC+2	Iemmello (yellow card) 2'; Antonini 46'; Nuamah (yellow card) 50'; Di Chiara (yellow card) 53'; Rispoli (yellow card) 79'		Bozhanaj (yellow card) 13'; Hasa (yellow card) 50'; Illanes 64'; Parlanti (yellow card) 90+6'	Stadium: Stadio Nicola Ceravolo; Attendance: 8,851; Referee: Maria Sole Ferrieri Caputi

20 September 2025 4	Reggiana	2–2	Catanzaro	Reggio Emilia
14:00 UTC+2	Marras (yellow card) 10', (goal) 36'; Lambourde 74'		Cissè 29', 78'; Favasuli (yellow card) 45+4'; Bettella (yellow card) 55'	Stadium: Mapei Stadium – Città del Tricolore; Attendance: 9,579; Referee: Niccolò Turrini

26 September 2025 5	Catanzaro	2–2	Juve Stabia	Catanzaro
19:30 UTC+2	Bettella (yellow card) 19'; Antonini (yellow card) 30'; Verrngia 53'; Iemmello 71'		Gabrielloni 21'; Cacciamani (yellow card) 25' (red card) 45+1'; Pierobon (yellow card) 36'; Carissoni 44', (yellow card) 72'; Burnete (yellow card) 64'; Piscopo (yellow card) 90+4'	Stadium: Stadio Nicola Ceravolo; Attendance: 8,884; Referee: Juan Luca Sacchi

1 October 2025 6	Sampdoria	0–0	Catanzaro	Genoa
19:30 UTC+2			Cissè (yellow card) 72'	Stadium: Stadio Luigi Ferraris; Attendance: 23,058; Referee: Federico Dionisi

4 October 2025 7	Monza	2–1	Catanzaro	Monza
14:00 UTC+2	Zeroli (yellow card) 19'; Birindelli (yellow card) 34', (goal) 66'; Álvarez 37'		Cissè 5', (yellow card) 34'	Stadium: Stadio Brianteo; Attendance: 7,559; Referee: Mario Perri

19 October 2025 8	Catanzaro	0–1	Padova	Catanzaro
18:30 UTC+2	Cassandro (yellow card) 39'; Pontisso (yellow card) 45+2'; Brihenti (yellow card) 48'		Perrotta 32'; Fusi (yellow card) 57'; Fortin (yellow card) 67'; Buonaiuto (yellow card) 72'; Sgarbi (yellow card) 74'	Stadium: Stadio Nicola Ceravolo; Attendance: 7,953; Referee: Simone Galipò

25 October 2025 9	Catanzaro	1–0	Palermo	Catanzaro
18:30 UTC+2	Petriccione (yellow card) 15'; Pontisso (yellow card) 39'; Cissè 45+2'; Iemmello (yellow card) 50'		Pierozzi (yellow card) 8'; Peda (yellow card) 74'; Palumbo (yellow card) 90+2'	Stadium: Stadio Nicola Ceravolo; Attendance: 8,400; Referee: Luca Pairetto

29 October 2025 10	Mantova	1–3	Catanzaro	Mantua
20:30 UTC+2	Mancuso 7'; Trimboli (yellow card) 60'		Majer 68' (o.g.); Brihenti (yellow card) 70'; Cissè 75'; Favasuli 80'; Antonini (yellow card) 89'	Stadium: Stadio Danilo Martelli; Attendance: 7,117; Referee: Matteo Marchetti

2 November 2025 11	Catanzaro	2–1	Venezia	Catanzaro
17:00 UTC+2	Iemmello 54'; Nuamah (yellow card) 61'; Alesi 80'		Pérez (yellow card) 45'; Yeboah 59'; Svoboda (yellow card) 61'; Adorante (yellow card) 74'; Hainaut (yellow card) 86'	Stadium: Stadio Nicola Ceravolo; Attendance: 8,655; Referee: Daniele Perenzoni

8 November 2025 12	Empoli	1–0	Catanzaro	Empoli
15:00 UTC+2	Oberetin (yellow card) 27'; Popov (yellow card) 31' (red card) 44'; Shpendi 59' (pen.); Yepes (yellow card) 70'; Fulignati (yellow card) 72'		Bettella (yellow card) 55'; Pigliacelli (yellow card) 66'; Brihenti (yellow card) 66'; Alesi (yellow card) 90'	Stadium: Stadio Carlo Castellani; Attendance: 6,816; Referee: Simone Galipò

21 November 2025 13	Catanzaro	3–3	Pescara	Catanzaro
20:30 UTC+2	Brihenti 21', (yellow card) 59'; Pittarello 46', (yellow card) 87'; Frosinini (yellow card) 80'; Buso 82', (yellow card) 83'; Antonini (yellow card) 90+2'		Di Nardo 10'; Dagasso (yellow card) 20'; Corazza 37', 90+3'; Corbo (yellow card) 55'; Caligara (yellow card) 74'	Stadium: Stadio Nicola Ceravolo; Attendance: 8,031; Referee: Luca Massimi

29 November 2025 14	Catanzaro	3–2	Virtus Entella	Catanzaro
17:15 UTC+2	Antonini (yellow card) 13'; Cassandro 28'; Pontisso 44' (pen.); Iemmello (yellow card) 41', (goal) 57'; Petriccione (yellow card) 58'; Brihenti (yellow card) 79'		Franzoni 14' (pen.); Bariti 33'; Parodi (yellow card) 79'; Benali (yellow card) 82'; Marconi (yellow card) 90+2'	Stadium: Stadio Nicola Ceravolo; Attendance: 7,691; Referee: Paride Tremolada

8 December 2025 15	Modena	1–2	Catanzaro	Modena
12:30 UTC+2	Mendes 31'		Bettella (yellow card) 30'; Cassandro (yellow card) 52'; Antonini 66'; Pittarello 90+1' (pen.)	Stadium: Stadio Alberto Braglia; Attendance: 11,303; Referee: Niccolò Turrini

13 December 2025 16	Catanzaro	1–0	Avellino	Catanzaro
17:15 UTC+2	Petriccione (yellow card) 20'; Pittarello (yellow card) 27'; Cissè 52'; Rispoli (yellow card) 90+4'		Missori (yellow card) 26'; Besaggio (yellow card) 90+2'	Stadium: Stadio Nicola Ceravolo; Attendance: 9,264; Referee: Andrea Calzavara

19 December 2025 17	Bari	1–2	Catanzaro	Bari
20:30 UTC+2	Nikolaou (yellow card) 77'; Bellomo 90+3' (pen.)		Pontisso 30'; Favasuli (yellow card) 46'; Antonini 49'; Brihenti (yellow card) 82'; Rispoli (yellow card) 86'	Stadium: Stadio San Nicola; Attendance: 9,816; Referee: Antonio Rapuano

27 December 2025 18	Catanzaro	2–0	Cesena	Catanzaro
15:00 UTC+2	Petriccione (yellow card) 17'; Iemmello 26'; Pittarello 53'; Brihenti (yellow card) 73'		Zaro (yellow card) 42'; Bisoli (yellow card) 52'	Stadium: Stadio Nicola Ceravolo; Attendance: 11,561; Referee: Valerio Crezzini

10 January 2026 19	Frosinone	2–0	Catanzaro	Frosinone
15:00 UTC+2	A. Oyono (yellow card) 31'; Calvani (yellow card) 65'; Cittadini (yellow card) 75'; Monterisi 81'; Gelli (yellow card) 85'; Bracaglia (yellow card) 90+5'; Ghedjemis 90+8'		Pontisso (yellow card) 44'; Frosinini (red card) 58'; Pigliacelli (yellow card) 74'; Petriccione (yellow card) 79'; Favasuli (yellow card) 90+5'	Stadium: Stadio Benito Stirpe; Attendance: 11,407; Referee: Federico Dionisi

17 January 2026 20	Venezia	3–1	Catanzaro	Venice
14:00 UTC+2	Busio 18'; Svoboda (yellow card) 50'; Adorante 86' (pen.); Casas 90+4'		D'Alessandro 6'; Pittarello (yellow card) 62'; Verrengia (red card) 73'; Antonini (yellow card) 84'; Cassandro (yellow card) 90+4'	Stadium: Stadio Pier Luigi Penzo; Attendance: 8,894; Referee: Giovanni Ayroldi

25 January 2026 21	Catanzaro	0–0	Sampdoria	Catanzaro
17:15 UTC+2	Cassandro (yellow card) 32'; Petriccione (yellow card) 42'; Frosinini (yellow card) 65'		Henderson (yellow card) 62'; Abildgaard (yellow card) 85'	Stadium: Stadio Nicola Ceravolo; Attendance: 8,290; Referee: Simone Sozza

31 January 2026 22	Südtirol	2–1	Catanzaro	Bolzano
15:00 UTC+2	Zedadka 3', (yellow card) 90+5'; Tait (yellow card) 14'; Merkaj 21'; Tronchin (yellow card) 55'; Adamonis (yellow card) 78'		Pittarello 6'; Petriccione (yellow card) 45+1'	Stadium: Stadio Druso; Attendance: 3,808; Referee: Niccolò Turrini

7 February 2026 23	Catanzaro	2–0	Reggiana	Catanzaro
15:00 UTC+2	Liberali 29'; D'Alessandro 52'; Nuamah (yellow card) 72'		Bozzolan (yellow card) 36'; Papetti (yellow card) 39'; Novakovich (yellow card) 83'	Stadium: Stadio Nicola Ceravolo; Attendance: 7,696; Referee: Mario Perri

10 February 2026 24	Pescara	0–2	Catanzaro	Pescara
20:00 UTC+2	Fanne (yellow card) 38'; Corbo (yellow card) 57'; Capellini (yellow card) 59'		Iemmello 30'; Nuamah (yellow card) 32'; Frosinini (yellow card) 45+4'; Antonini (yellow card) 55'; Alesi 79'	Stadium: Stadio Adriatico – Giovanni Cornacchia; Attendance: 6,972; Referee: Simone Galipò

14 February 2026 25	Catanzaro	2–0	Mantova	Catanzaro
17:15 UTC+2	Iemmello 5'; Pontisso 39'		Gonçalves (yellow card) 45+4'	Stadium: Stadio Nicola Ceravolo; Attendance: 7,405; Referee: Andrea Zanotti

21 February 2026 26	Virtus Entella	1–3	Catanzaro	Chiavari
15:00 UTC+2	Franzoni 70'; Tirelli (yellow card) 78'; Cuppone (yellow card) 79'		Antonini (yellow card) 16'; Favasuli 45+2'; Petriccione 68'; Pompetti 74'	Stadium: Stadio Comunale; Attendance: 2,827; Referee: Daniele Perenzoni

1 March 2026 27	Catanzaro	2–2	Frosinone	Catanzaro
15:00 UTC+2	Frosinini 45+2'; Liberali 46'; Iemmello (yellow card) 89'		A. Oyono (yellow card) 28'; Cichella 49'; Fiori 67', (yellow card) 68'; Cittadini (yellow card) 89'; J. Oyono (yellow card) 90+4'	Stadium: Stadio Nicola Ceravolo; Attendance: 9,919; Referee: Simone Galipò

4 March 2026 28	Carrarese	3–3	Catanzaro	Carrara
19:00 UTC+2	Melegoni 3'; Abiuso 64', (yellow card) 83'; Rispoli 76' (o.g.)		Illanes 7' (o.g.); Petriccione (yellow card) 20'; Cassandro 39'; Liberali (yellow card) 50'	Stadium: Stadio dei Marmi; Attendance: 3,566; Referee: Federico Dionisi

8 March 2026 29	Catanzaro	3–2	Empoli	Catanzaro
15:00 UTC+2	Pittarello 56', 63'; Cassandro 73'; Antonini (yellow card) 86'		Elia 1'; Nasti 15'; Yepes (yellow card) 17'; Magnino (yellow card) 24'; Guarino (yellow card) 45+3'	Stadium: Stadio Ncioa Ceravolo; Attendance: 8,413; Referee: Valerio Crezzini

14 March 2026 30	Padova	1–3	Catanzaro	Padua
15:00 UTC+2	Di Mariano (yellow card) 65'; Di Maggio 90+2'		Alesi 17'; Liberali (yellow card) 36'; Iemmello 51', 90+4'; Favasuli (yellow card) 83'	Stadium: Stadio Euganeo; Attendance: 8,020; Referee: Maria Sole Ferrieri Caputi

21 March 2026 31	Cesena	3–1	Catanzaro	Cesena
15:00 UTC+2	Cerri 59', (yellow card) 78'; Corazza (yellow card) 70'; Piacentini 72'; Zaro (yellow card) 82'; Olivieri (yellow card) 87'; Berti 90+4'		Liberati 34'; Nuamah (red card) 87'; Iemmello (yellow card) 90+6'	Stadium: Estadio Dino Manuzzi; Attendance: 11,368; Referee: Andrea Calzavara

6 April 2026 32	Catanzaro	1–1	Monza	Catanzaro
14:00 UTC+2	Pontisso 6'; D'Alessandro (yellow card) 15'; Pittarello (yellow card) 32'; Alesi (red card) 36'; Brighenti (yellow card) 69'; Cassandro (yellow card) 76'		Cutrone (yellow card) 8' (red card) 48'; Lucchesi (yellow card) 45'; Baldé (red card) 76'; Pessina 90+6' (pen.)	Stadium: Stadio Nicola Ceravolo; Attendance: 8,588; Referee: Giovanni Ayroldi

11 April 2026 33	Avellino	1–1	Catanzaro	Avellino
16:15 UTC+2	Russo (yellow card) 10'; Sounas (yellow card) 29'; Cancellotti (yellow card) 40'; Iannarilli 90+5', (yellow card) 90+6'		Petriccione (yellow card) 4'; Brighenti (yellow card) 56' (red card) 75'; Iemmello 60'; Pontisso (yellow card) 66'; Di Francesco (yellow card) 72'	Stadium: Stadio Partenio; Attendance: 9,500; Referee: Paride Tremolada

14 April 2026 34	Catanzaro	2–2	Modena	Catanzaro
18:00 UTC+2	Pittarello 5'; Cassandro (yellow card) 27'; Pontisso (yellow card) 34'; Rispoli 40'		Adorni 28'; Gerli (yellow card) 46'; Mendes 90+5'; Cotali (yellow card) 90+6'	Stadium: Stadio Nicola Ceravolo; Attendance: 8,334; Referee: Claudio Giuseppe Allegretta

18 April 2026 35	Juve Stabia	1–1	Catanzaro	Castellammare di Stabia
18:30 UTC+2	Mosti 18'; Torrasi (yellow card) 61'; Okoro (yellow card) 75'		Cassandro (yellow card) 83'; Di Francesco 88'	Stadium: Stadio Romeo Menti; Attendance: 6,118; Referee: Niccolò Turrini

25 April 2026 36	Catanzaro	4–2	Spezia	Catanzaro
11:30 UTC+2	Petriccione 24', (yellow card) 66'; Fellipe Jack 63'; Pittarello 78', 82'		Valoti 44', (yellow card) 80'; Di Serio (yellow card) 45'; Hristov (yellow card) 75'; Lapadula 90+3' (pen.)	Stadium: Stadio Nicola Ceravolo; Referee: Marco Piccinini

1 May 2026 37	Palermo	3–2	Catanzaro	Palermo
14:00 UTC+2	Johnsen 15', (yellow card) 77'; Gyasi (yellow card) 45+2'; Nuamah 54' (o.g.); Pohjanpalo 86' (pen.)		Pittarello 3', 32'	Stadium: Stadio Renzo Barbera; Attendance: 28,616; Referee: Claudio Giuseppe Allegretta

8 May 2026 38	Catanzaro	2–3	Bari	Catanzaro
19:30 UTC+2	Verrengia 12'; Buglio (yellow card) 16'; Koffi 90+7' (pen.)		Moncini 23'; Piscopo (yellow card) 28', (goal) 40', 50'	Stadium: Stadio Nicola Ceravolo; Attendance: 8,614; Referee: Simone Sozza

==== Promotion play-offs ====
12 May 2026 Quarter-finals	Catanzaro	3–0	Avellino	Catanzaro
20:00 UTC+2	Pontisso 41'; Cassandro 82'; Iemmello 90+2' (pen.)		Cancellotti (yellow card) 15'	Stadium: Stadio Nicola Ceravolo; Attendance: 10,210; Referee: Livio Marinelli

17 May 2026 Semi-finals First leg	Catanzaro	3–0	Palermo	Catanzaro
19:00 UTC+2	Iemmello 1', 15'; Liberali 41'; Frosinini (yellow card) 90+2'		Ranocchia (yellow card) 32'; Pierozzi (yellow card) 45+4'; Augello (yellow card) 59'	Stadium: Stadio Nicola Ceravolo; Attendance: 8,400; Referee: Ermanno Feliciani

20 May 2026 Semi-finals Second leg	Palermo	2–0 (2–3 agg.)	Catanzaro	Palermo
19:00 UTC+2	Pohjanpalo 3'; Johnsen (yellow card) 20'; Segre (yellow card) 45+4'; Vasić (yellow card) 65'; Modesto 89'; Pierozzi (red card) 90+3'; Palumbo (red card) 90+6'		Pittarello (yellow card) 49'; Pontisso (yellow card) 90+4'; Di Francesco (yellow card) 90+5'	Stadium: Stadio Renzo Barbera; Attendance: 33,286; Referee: Matteo Marcenaro

24 May 2026 Final First leg	Catanzaro	0–2	Monza	Catanzaro
19:00 UTC+2	D'Alessandro (yellow card) 90+4'; Petriccione (yellow card) 90+6'	Report	Colombo (yellow card) 45+2'; Hernani 77'; Petagna (yellow card) 83'; Caso 89', (yellow card) 90'	Stadium: Stadio Nicola Ceravolo; Attendance: 12,705; Referee: Matteo Marchetti

29 May 2026 Final Second leg	Monza	0–2 (2–2 agg.)	Catanzaro	Monza
19:00 UTC+2	Mota (yellow card) 85'; Birindelli (yellow card) 87'; Antov (yellow card) 90+3'; Thiam (yellow card) 90+5'	Report	Pontisso (yellow card) 25'; Fellipe Jack 39'; Frosinini 78', (yellow card) 85'; Koffi (yellow card) 90+2'	Stadium: Stadio Brianteo; Attendance: 17,015; Referee: Davide Massa

The promotion play-off final ended 2–2 on aggregate. As Monza finished the regular season in a higher position than Catanzaro, Monza were promoted to Serie A, while Catanzaro remained in Serie B.

=== Coppa Italia ===
15 August 2025 Round of 32	Sassuolo	1–0	Catanzaro	Reggio Emilia
18:30 UTC+2	Doig 32'			Stadium: Mapei Stadium – Città del Tricolore; Referee: Nicolò Turrini

== Statistics ==
=== Appearances and goals ===
No.	Pos	Nat	Player	Total		Serie B		Play-offs		Coppa Italia	
No.	Pos	Nat	Player	Apps	Goals	Apps	Goals	Apps	Goals	Apps	Goals
Goalkeepers
1	GK	(Italy) ITA	Christian Marietta	1	0	1	0	0	0	0	0
12	GK	(Italy) ITA	Lorenzo Madia	0	0	0	0	0	0	0	0
22	GK	(Italy) ITA	Mirko Pigliacelli	43	0	37	0	5	0	1	0
99	GK	(Italy) ITA	Edoardo Borrelli	0	0	0	0	0	0	0	0
Defenders
2	DF	(Portugal) POR	Gonçalo Esteves	3	0	1+2	0	0	0	0	0
4	DF	(Brazil) BRA	Matias Antonini	42	3	36	3	5	0	1	0
5	DF	(Albania) ALB	Ervin Bashi	7	0	1+5	0	0+1	0	0	0
6	DF	(Brazil) BRA	Fellipe Jack	5	2	4	1	1	1	0	0
23	DF	(Italy) ITA	Nicolò Brighenti	32	1	26+1	1	4	0	1	0
26	DF	(Italy) ITA	Bruno Verrengia	15	2	7+8	2	0	0	0	0
62	DF	(Italy) ITA	Ruggero Frosinini	31	2	7+19	1	0+4	1	1	0
83	DF	(Italy) ITA	Carlo Castro Rombolà	0	0	0	0	0	0	0	0
84	DF	(Italy) ITA	Tommaso Cassandro	38	4	30+3	3	5	1	0	0
Midfielders
10	MF	(Italy) ITA	Jacopo Petriccione	33	2	26+1	2	5	0	1	0
14	MF	(Italy) ITA	Mattia Liberali	30	4	15+9	3	5	1	1	0
20	MF	(Italy) ITA	Simone Pontisso	41	5	33+2	4	5	1	1	0
21	MF	(Italy) ITA	Marco Pompetti	21	1	3+14	1	0+4	0	0	0
27	MF	(Italy) ITA	Costantino Favasuli	42	2	35+1	2	5	0	0+1	0
32	MF	(Italy) ITA	Fabio Rispoli	36	1	18+13	1	0+4	0	1	0
61	MF	(Madagascar) MAD	Sayha Seha	0	0	0	0	0	0	0	0
98	MF	(Italy) ITA	Davide Buglio	14	0	4+10	0	0	0	0	0
Forwards
8	FW	(Italy) ITA	Filippo Pittarello	35	12	19+10	12	5	0	0+1	0
9	FW	(Italy) ITA	Pietro Iemmello	39	13	32+1	10	4+1	3	1	0
19	FW	(Italy) ITA	Patrick Nuamah	29	0	7+20	0	0+1	0	1	0
28	FW	(France) FRA	Rémi Oudin	11	0	7+3	0	0+1	0	0	0
30	FW	(Italy) ITA	Gabriele Alesi	25	3	6+14	3	4+1	0	0	0
39	FW	(Ivory Coast) CIV	N'dri Philippe Koffi	11	1	1+9	1	0+1	0	0	0
77	FW	(Italy) ITA	Marco D'Alessandro	29	2	20+6	2	0+2	0	0+1	0
80	FW	(Italy) ITA	Alphadjo Cissè	22	6	21+1	6	0	0	0	0
81	FW	(Italy) ITA	Simone Ardizzone	0	0	0	0	0	0	0	0
82	FW	(Albania) ALB	Kevin Gjoka	0	0	0	0	0	0	0	0
94	FW	(Italy) ITA	Federico Di Francesco	19	1	5+9	1	2+3	0	0	0
Players transferred out during the season
7	FW	(Italy) ITA	Luca Pandolfi	11	0	2+9	0	0	0	0	0
17	DF	(Italy) ITA	Gianluca Di Chiara	14	0	6+7	0	0	0	1	0
18	DF	(Italy) ITA	Davide Bettella	13	0	8+4	0	0	0	0+1	0
45	FW	(Italy) ITA	Nicolò Buso	5	1	0+4	1	0	0	0+1	0
91	FW	(Italy) ITA	Gabriel Arditi	0	0	0	0	0	0	0	0
