= 2024–25 US Catanzaro 1929 season =

US Catanzaro 1929
2024–25 season
- Manager: Fabio Caserta
- Stadium: Stadio Nicola Ceravolo
- Serie B: 6th
- Serie B Promotion play-offs: Semi-finalists
- Coppa Italia: First round
- Top goalscorer: League: Pietro Iemmello (16); All: Pietro Iemmello (17)
- Highest home attendance: 13,297 vs Cosenza (17 March 2025)
- Lowest home attendance: 7,341 vs Brescia
- Average home league attendance: 9,512
- Biggest win: 4–0 vs Cosenza (H) (17 March 2025)
- Biggest defeat: 0–4 vs Cremonese (A) (9 March 2025)

The 2024–25 season is the 96th in the history of US Catanzaro 1929 and the second consecutive season in the Italian Serie B. In addition to their domestic campaign, the team also competed in the Coppa Italia, where they were eliminated in the first round.

On 5 July 2024, Giallorossi announced the appointment of Fabio Caserta as head coach under a two-year contract.

== Transfers ==
=== In ===
Pos.	Player	Transferred from	Fee	Date	Source
MF	(Senegal) Mamadou Coulibaly	(Italy) Salernitana	Undisclosed	30 August 2024	
FW	(Italy) Andrea La Mantia	(Italy) SPAL	Loan	30 August 2024	

=== Out ===
Pos.	Player	Transferred to	Fee	Date	Source
DF	(Slovenia) Luka Krajnc	(Slovenia) Maribor	Undisclosed	7 September 2024	
FW	(Italy) Giovanni Volpe	(Italy) Audace Cerignola	Loan	3 January 2025	
DF	(Italy) Marcello Piras	(Italy) Crotone	Loan	5 January 2025	

== Pre-season and friendlies ==
30 July 2024 Friendly	Cagliari	2–0	Catanzaro
19:00

3 August 2024 Friendly	Catanzaro	2–5	Juventus Next Gen

== Competitions ==
=== Overall record ===
Competition	First match	Last match	Starting round	Final position	Record							
Competition	First match	Last match	Starting round	Final position	Pld	W	D	L	GF	GA	GD	Win %
Serie B	18 August 2024	9 May 2025	Matchday 1	6th	38	11	20	7	51	45	+6	28.95
Serie B Promotion play-offs	17 May 2025	25 May 2025	Preliminary round	Semi-finals	3	1	0	2	2	4	−2	33.33
Coppa Italia	10 August 2024		First round	First round	1	0	0	1	1	4	−3	0.00
Total					42	12	20	10	54	53	+1	28.57

Last updated: Completed
Source: worldfootball.net

=== Serie B ===
==== League table ====
Pos	Team	Pld	W	D	L	GF	GA	GD	Pts	Promotion, qualification or relegation
4	Cremonese (O, P)	38	16	13	9	62	44	+18	61	Qualification for promotion play-offs semi-finals
5	Juve Stabia	38	14	13	11	42	41	+1	55	Qualification for promotion play-offs preliminary round
6	Catanzaro	38	11	20	7	51	45	+6	53	Qualification for promotion play-offs preliminary round
7	Cesena	38	14	11	13	46	47	−1	53	Qualification for promotion play-offs preliminary round
8	Palermo	38	14	10	14	52	43	+9	52	Qualification for promotion play-offs preliminary round

Source: Serie BKT
Rules for classification: 1) Points; 2) Head-to-head points; 3) Head-to-head goal difference; 4) Goal difference; 5) Goals scored; 6) Draw.
(Note: Head-to-head record is used only after all the matches between the teams in question have been played)
(O) Play-off winners; (P) Promoted

==== Results summary ====
Overall								Home						Away					
Pld	W	D	L	GF	GA	GD	Pts	W	D	L	GF	GA	GD	W	D	L	GF	GA	GD
38	11	20	7	51	45	+6	53	7	9	3	31	21	+10	4	11	4	20	24	−4

Last updated: Complete.
Source: worldfootball.net

==== Results by round ====
Round	1	2	3	4	5	6	7	8	9	10	11	12	13	14	15	16	17	18	19	20	21	22	23	24	25	26	27	28	29	30	31	32	33	34	35	36	37	38
Ground	H	H	A	H	A	H	A	H	A	H	A	H	A	H	A	H	A	H	A	H	A	H	A	H	A	H	A	H	A	H	A	H	A	A	H	A	H	A
Result	D	D	L	W	D	L	D	D	D	W	D	D	D	D	D	W	W	L	D	W	D	D	W	W	D	W	W	D	L	W	L	D	D	D	L	L	D	W
Position	12	14	17	12	13	16	16	16	16	10	10	11	11	11	11	9	8	8	7	7	6	7	6	5	5	5	4	4	5	5	5	6	6	7	7	6	6	6

Updated to match(es) played on Completed. Source: Worldfootball.net
A = Away; H = Home; W = Win; D = Draw; L = Loss

==== Matches ====
18 August 2024 1	Catanzaro	1–1	Sassuolo	Catanzaro
19:30	Pontisso 53'	Report	Mulattieri 38'	Stadium: Stadio Nicola Ceravolo; Attendance: 12,490; Referee: Marco Piccinini

25 August 2024 2	Catanzaro	0–0	Juve Stabia	Catanzaro
19:30		Report		Stadium: Stadio Nicola Ceravolo; Attendance: 11,788; Referee: Daniele Rutella

28 August 2024 3	Cesena	2–0	Catanzaro	Cesena
19:30	Kargbo 18'; Adamo 47'	Report		Stadium: Stadio Dino Manuzzi; Attendance: 11,870; Referee: Giuseppe Collu

1 September 2024 4	Catanzaro	3–1	Carrarese	Catanzaro
19:30	Biasci 34'; Iemmello 45'; Pontisso 53'	Report	Bouah 44'	Stadium: Stadio Nicola Ceravolo; Attendance: 9,348; Referee: Daniele Perenzoni

14 September 2024 5	Cittadella	0–0	Catanzaro	Cittadella
14:00		Report		Stadium: Stadio Pier Cesare Tombolato; Attendance: 3,872; Referee: Ermanno Feliciani

20 September 2024 6	Catanzaro	1–2	Cremonese	Catanzaro
19:30	Compagnon 28'	Report	Castagnetti 5'; Barbieri 88'	Stadium: Stadio Nicola Ceravolo; Attendance: 9,316; Referee: Ivano Pezzuto

29 September 2024 7	Salernitana	0–0	Catanzaro	Salerno
14:00		Report		Stadium: Stadio Arechi; Attendance: 14,932; Referee: Livio Marinelli

6 October 2024 8	Catanzaro	2–2	Modena	Catanzaro
14:00	Šitum 25'; La Mantia 89'	Report	Abiuso 34'; Idrissi 56'	Stadium: Stadio Nicola Ceravolo; Attendance: 8,394; Referee: Giuseppe Collu

18 October 2024 9	Bari	1–1	Catanzaro	Bari
19:30	Dorval 30'	Report	Iemmello 74'	Stadium: Stadio San Nicola; Attendance: 18,615; Referee: Andrea Colombo

27 October 2024 10	Catanzaro	3–0	Südtirol	Catanzaro
14:00	Pontisso 5'; Iemmello 24', 41' (pen.)	Report		Stadium: Stadio Nicola Ceravolo; Attendance: 8,255; Referee: Alberto Santoro

30 October 2024 11	Pisa	0–0	Catanzaro	Pisa
19:30		Report		Stadium: Arena Garibaldi; Attendance: 7,859; Referee: Daniele Perenzoni

3 November 2024 12	Catanzaro	0–0	Frosinone	Catanzaro
14:00		Report		Stadium: Stadio Nicola Ceravolo; Attendance: 8,893; Referee: Simone Sozza

10 November 2024 13	Reggiana	2–2	Catanzaro	Reggio Emilia
14:00	Portanova 25'; Gondo 31'	Report	Pompetti 41'; Iemmello 75'	Stadium: Mapei Stadium; Attendance: 9,959; Referee: Alessandro Prontera

23 November 2024 14	Catanzaro	2–2	Mantova	Catanzaro
14:00	Iemmello 26'; Buso 79'	Report	Bragantini 7', 65'	Stadium: Stadio Nicola Ceravolo; Attendance: 8,089; Referee: Marco Monaldi

30 November 2024 15	Sampdoria	3–3	Catanzaro	Genoa
14:00	Sekulov 42'; Tutino 42' (pen.); Leonardi 90'	Report	Iemmello 53', 67' (pen.), 70'	Stadium: Stadio Luigi Ferraris; Attendance: 22,906; Referee: Paride Tremolada

8 December 2024 16	Catanzaro	2–1	Brescia	Catanzaro
14:00	Biasci 43'; Bonini 90+8'	Report	Bjarnason 20'	Stadium: Stadio Nicola Ceravolo; Attendance: 7,341; Referee: Mario Perri

15 December 2024 17	Palermo	1–2	Catanzaro	Palermo
14:00	Nikolaou 32'	Report	Biasci 3'; Pompetti 82'	Stadium: Stadio Renzo Barbera; Attendance: 18,304; Referee: Alberto Arena

21 December 2024 18	Catanzaro	0–1	Spezia	Catanzaro
16:15		Report	Esposito 18'	Stadium: Stadio Nicola Ceravolo; Attendance: 8,893; Referee: Matteo Marchetti

26 December 2024 19	Cosenza	1–1	Catanzaro	Cosenza
14:00	Ciervo 90+16' (pen.)	Report	Pompetti 80'	Stadium: Stadio San Vito; Attendance: 10,603; Referee: Gianluca Aureliano

29 December 2024 20	Catanzaro	1–0	Salernitana	Catanzaro
16:15	Iemmello 57'	Report		Stadium: Stadio Nicola Ceravolo; Attendance: 10,684; Referee: Daniele Perenzoni

12 January 2025 21	Südtirol	1–1	Catanzaro	Bolzano
14:00	Pyyhtiä 8'	Report	Bonini 3'	Stadium: Stadio Druso; Attendance: 3,169; Referee: Luca Massimi

19 January 2025 22	Catanzaro	0–0	Pisa	Catanzaro
14:00		Report		Stadium: Stadio Nicola Ceravolo; Attendance: 8,293; Referee: Federico La Penna

26 January 2025 23	Brescia	2–3	Catanzaro	Brescia
14:00	Nuamah 5'; Bianchi 86'	Report	Iemmello 11'; Bonini 68', 90+7'	Stadium: Stadio Mario Rigamonti; Attendance: 5,674; Referee: Maria Ferrieri Caputi

1 February 2025 24	Catanzaro	4–2	Cesensa	Catanzaro
14:00	Bonini 3'; Pieraccini 10' (o.g.); Iemmello 38'; Cassandro 66'	Report	Scognamillo 30' (o.g.); Antonucci 70'	Stadium: Stadio Nicola Ceravolo; Attendance: 8,514; Referee: Simone Galipò

8 February 2025 25	Frosinone	1–1	Catanzaro	Frosinone
14:00	Lusuardi 32'	Report	Quagliata 59'	Stadium: Stadio Benito Stirpe; Attendance: 11,420; Referee: Fabio Maresca

14 February 2025 26	Catanzaro	1–0	Cittadella	Catanzaro
19:30	Iemmello 65'	Report		Stadium: Stadio Nicola Ceravolo; Attendance: 8,458; Referee: Valerio Crezzini

23 February 2025 27	Spezia	0–1	Catanzaro	La Spezia
14:00		Report	Pittarello 75'	Stadium: Stadio Alberto Picco; Attendance: 9,512; Referee: Federico La Penna

2 March 2025 28	Catanzaro	1–1	Reggiana	Catanzaro
15:00	Scognamillo 75'	Report	Vido 15'	Stadium: Stadio Nicola Ceravolo; Attendance: 8,825; Referee: Juan Luca Sacchi

8 March 2025 29	Cremonese	4–0	Catanzaro	Cremona
15:00	Johnsen 31', 76'; Ravenelli 65'; De Luca 70' (pen.)	Report		Stadium: Stadio Giovanni Zini; Attendance: 10,462; Referee: Alberto Arena

16 March 2025 30	Catanzaro	4–0	Cosenza	Catanzaro
17:15	Iemmello 20'; Pompetti 46'; Bonini 54'; Coulibaly 68'	Report		Stadium: Stadio Nicola Ceravolo; Attendance: 13,297; Referee: Davide Ghersini

29 March 2025 31	Modena	2–1	Catanzaro	Modena
15:00	Magnino 33'; Gliozzi 67'	Report	Iemmello 62'	Stadium: Stadio Alberto Braglia; Attendance: 10,088; Referee: Daniele Perenzoni

6 April 2025 32	Catanzaro	3–3	Bari	Catanzaro
15:00	Iemmello 44'; Bonini 69'; Quagliata 83'	Report	Lasagna 27'; Favasuli 78'; Favilli 90+2'	Stadium: Stadio Nicola Ceravolo; Attendance: 10,318; Referee: Antonio Giua

12 April 2025 33	Carrarese	2–2	Catanzaro	Carrara
15:00	Cherubini 43'; Shpendi 81'	Report	Compagnon 54'; Pittarello 65'	Stadium: Stadio dei Marmi; Attendance: 3,950; Referee: Marco Monaldi

13 May 2025 34	Mantova	0–0	Catanzaro	Mantova
15:00		Report		Stadium: Stadio Danilo Martelli; Attendance: 10,305; Referee: Gianluca Aureliano

27 April 2025 35	Catanzaro	1–3	Palermo	Catanzaro
15:00	Biasci 56'	Report	Bonini 9' (o.g.); Segre 26'; Le Douaron 90+3'	Stadium: Stadio Nicola Ceravolo; Attendance: 9,021; Referee: Ermanno Feliciani

1 May 2025 36	Juve Stabia	2–0	Catanzaro	Castellammare di Stabia
12:30	Mosti 25'; Candellone 41' (pen.)	Report		Stadium: Stadio Romeo Menti; Attendance: 3,622; Referee: Marco Monaldi

4 May 2025 37	Catanzaro	2–2	Sampdoria	Catanzaro
15:00	Brightenti 45'; Biasci 47'	Report	Depaoli 23'; Coda 50'	Stadium: Stadio Nicola Ceravolo; Attendance: 9,412; Referee: Giovanni Ayroldi

9 May 2025 38	Sassuolo	0–2	Catanzaro	Reggio Emilia
20:30	Biasci 52'; Bonini 90+1'	Report		Stadium: Mapei Stadium – Città del Tricolore; Attendance: 7,203; Referee: Daniele Perenzoni

==== Promotion play-offs ====
17 May 2025 Preliminary round	Catanzaro	1–0	Cesena	Catanzaro
17:15 CEST (UTC+2)	Iemmello 52'	Report		Stadium: Stadio Nicola Ceravolo; Attendance: 10,501; Referee: Juan Luca Sacchi

21 May 2025 Semi-finals; First leg	Catanzaro	0–2	Spezia	Catanzaro
20:30 CEST (UTC+2)		Report	Di Serio 49'; Esposito 61'	Stadium: Nicola Ceravolo; Attendance: 12,256; Referee: Kevin Bonacina

25 May 2025 Semi-finals; Second leg	Spezia	2–1 (4–1 agg.)	Catanzaro	La Spezia
19:30 CEST (UTC+2)	Aurelio 36'; Wiśniewski 61'	Report	Cassandro 31'	Stadium: Alberto Picco; Attendance: 11,599; Referee: Fabio Maresca

=== Coppa Italia ===
10 August 2024 First round	Empoli	4–1	Catanzaro	Empoli
				Stadium: Stadio Carlo Castellani

== Statistics ==
=== Appearances and goals ===
No.	Pos	Nat	Player	Total		Serie B		Play-offs		Coppa Italia	
No.	Pos	Nat	Player	Apps	Goals	Apps	Goals	Apps	Goals	Apps	Goals
Goalkeepers
22	GK	(Italy) ITA	Mirko Pigliacelli	42	0	38	0	3	0	1	0
25	GK	(Italy) ITA	Ludovico Gelmi	0	0	0	0	0	0	0	0
99	GK	(Italy) ITA	Edoardo Borrelli	0	0	0	0	0	0	0	0
Defenders
3	DF	(Italy) ITA	Giacomo Quagliata	18	2	14+1	2	3	0	0	0
4	DF	(Brazil) BRA	Matias Antonini	21	0	15+6	0	0	0	0	0
6	DF	(Italy) ITA	Federico Bonini	40	9	36	8	3	0	1	1
14	DF	(Italy) ITA	Stefano Scognamillo	38	1	31+3	1	3	0	1	0
23	DF	(Italy) ITA	Nicolò Brighenti	34	1	30+1	1	2	0	1	0
34	DF	(Austria) AUT	Philipp Breit	0	0	0	0	0	0	0	0
82	DF	(Italy) ITA	Christian Corradi	0	0	0	0	0	0	0	0
84	DF	(Italy) ITA	Tommaso Cassandro	32	2	18+11	1	3	1	0	0
93	DF	(Italy) ITA	Mario Paura	0	0	0	0	0	0	0	0
Midfielders
8	MF	(Romania) ROU	Rares Ilie	15	0	5+7	0	2+1	0	0	0
10	MF	(Italy) ITA	Jacopo Petriccione	38	0	30+4	0	3	0	1	0
20	MF	(Italy) ITA	Simone Pontisso	35	3	28+3	3	2+1	0	1	0
21	MF	(Italy) ITA	Marco Pompetti	37	4	27+6	4	2+1	0	0+1	0
24	MF	(Italy) ITA	Riccardo Pagano	21	0	11+9	0	0	0	1	0
33	MF	(Italy) ITA	Cristian Aloisio	0	0	0	0	0	0	0	0
61	MF	(Italy) ITA	Karol Maiolo	1	0	0	0	0	0	0+1	0
80	MF	(Italy) ITA	Mamadou Coulibaly	23	1	3+19	1	0+1	0	0	0
92	MF	(Croatia) CRO	Mario Šitum	25	1	18+6	1	0	0	1	0
Forwards
7	FW	(Italy) ITA	Mattia Compagnon	22	2	14+8	2	0	0	0	0
9	FW	(Italy) ITA	Pietro Iemmello	39	17	35	16	3	1	1	0
19	FW	(Italy) ITA	Andrea La Mantia	16	1	5+9	1	1+1	0	0	0
28	FW	(Italy) ITA	Tommaso Biasci	35	6	20+11	6	2+1	0	1	0
29	FW	(Senegal) SEN	Demba Seck	18	0	2+16	0	0	0	0	0
45	FW	(Italy) ITA	Nicolo Buso	18	1	3+13	1	1+1	0	0	0
63	FW	(Italy) ITA	Gabriel Giacinto Rafele	0	0	0	0	0	0	0	0
70	FW	(Italy) ITA	Marco D'Alessandro	17	2	7+8	2	0+2	0	0	0
90	FW	(Italy) ITA	Filippo Pittarello	37	2	13+20	2	0+3	0	0+1	0
91	FW	(Italy) ITA	Gabriel Arditi	0	0	0	0	0	0	0	0
Players transferred out during the season
1	GK	(Italy) ITA	Andrea Dini	0	0	0	0	0	0	0	0
2	DF	(Italy) ITA	Marcello Piras	0	0	0	0	0	0	0	0
3	DF	(Italy) ITA	Riccardo Turicchia	2	0	0+1	0	0	0	0+1	0
27	DF	(Italy) ITA	Andrea Ceseroli	7	0	6+1	0	0	0	0	0
32	DF	(Slovenia) SVN	Luka Krajnc	1	0	0+1	0	0	0	0	0
8	MF	(Greece) GRE	Ilias Koutsoupias	11	0	7+4	0	0	0	0	0
17	FW	(Italy) ITA	Enrico Brignola	6	0	2+4	0	0	0	0	0
77	FW	(Italy) ITA	Giovanni Volpe	3	0	0+2	0	0	0	1	0
