= Mirko Pigliacelli =

Italian footballer

- Pigliacelli in 2013

Personal information
- Date of birth: 30 June 1993 (age 33)
- Place of birth: Rome, Italy
- Height: 1.84 m (6 ft 0 in)
- Position: Goalkeeper

Team information
- Current team: Catanzaro
- Number: 22

Youth career
- –2010: Lazio
- 2010–2012: Roma

Senior career*
Years	Team	Apps	(Gls)
2012–2015	Parma	0	(0)
2012–2013	→ Sassuolo (loan)	1	(0)
2013–2014	→ Pescara (loan)	3	(0)
2014	→ Reggina (loan)	21	(0)
2014–2015	→ Frosinone (loan)	10	(0)
2015	Frosinone	7	(0)
2015–2018	Pescara	8	(0)
2015–2016	→ Pro Vercelli (loan)	39	(0)
2017	→ Trapani (loan)	21	(0)
2018	→ Pro Vercelli (loan)	21	(0)
2018	Pro Vercelli	0	(0)
2018	→ Universitatea Craiova (loan)	21	(0)
2019–2022	Universitatea Craiova	120	(1)
2022–2024	Palermo	74	(0)
2024–	Catanzaro	75	(0)

International career
2011	Italy U18	3	(0)
2011–2012	Italy U19	5	(0)
2012–2014	Italy U20	7	(0)
2013	Italy U21	2	(0)
- * Club domestic league appearances and goals as of 10 May 2026

Mirko Pigliacelli (born 30 June 1993) is an Italian professional footballer who plays as a goalkeeper for Serie B club Catanzaro.

== Club career ==
Pigliacelli is a graduate of the Roma youth academy. In 2012, he moved to fellow Serie A club Parma. For the 2012–13 season, he was loaned to Serie B team Sassuolo, but played only once for I Neroverdi as they were promoted to Serie A. During the 2013–14 season, he had further Serie B loan spells, this time for Pescara and Reggina, playing a combined 24 league games.

In 2014, he joined Serie B newcomers, Frosinone on a season long loan. on 26 January 2015 the deal became definitive.

Pigliacelli then joined Pescara in the summer of 2015 as a free agent, and was immediately loaned to Pro Vercelli for the remainder of the season. On 3 January 2018, he was again loaned to Pro Vercelli.

=== Universitatea Craiova ===
On 30 June 2018, he joined Universitatea Craiova on a season long loan. After becoming one of the most appreciated goalkeepers of the Romanian Liga I, on 18 December 2018, "the white and blues" announced they had extended their contract with Pigliacelli. The goalkeeper signed a new deal until 2022, plus an extension for another year while Universitatea paid Pro Vercelli €300,000 to make the move permanent.

In 2019, according to Tuttomercato he attracted transfer interest from Serie A clubs Torino, Cagliari and Parma.

=== Return to Italy ===
On 22 July 2022, Pigliacelli signed a three-year contract with Palermo in Serie B.

== Career statistics ==
As of match played 25 April 2026

Appearances and goals by club, season and competition
Club	Season	League			National cup (Note: Includes Coppa Italia, Cupa României)		Continental		Other		Total	
Club	Season	Division	Apps	Goals	Apps	Goals	Apps	Goals	Apps	Goals	Apps	Goals
Sassuolo (loan)	2012–13	Serie B	1	0	0	0	—		—		1	0
Pescara (loan)	2013–14	Serie B	3	0	2	0	—		—		5	0
Reggina (loan)	2013–14	Serie B	21	0	—		—		—		21	0
Frosinone (loan)	2014–15	Serie B	17	0	0	0	—		—		17	0
Pescara	2015–16	Serie B	—		0	0	—		—		0	0
Pescara	2016–17	Serie A	0	0	0	0	—		—		0	0
Pescara	2017–18	Serie B	8	0	1	0	—		—		9	0
Pescara	Total		8	0	1	0	—		—		9	0
Pro Vercelli (loan)	2015–16	Serie B	39	0	—		—		—		39	0
Trapani (loan)	2016–17	Serie B	21	0	—		—		—		21	0
Pro Vercelli (loan)	2017–18	Serie B	21	0	—		—		—		21	0
Universitatea Craiova	2018–19	Liga I	36	1	3	0	2 (Note: Appearance(s) in UEFA Europa League)	0	1 (Note: Appearance in Supercupa României)	0	42	1
Universitatea Craiova	2019–20	Liga I	29	0	1	0	6	0	—		36	0
Universitatea Craiova	2020–21	Liga I	40	0	6	0	1	0	—		47	0
Universitatea Craiova	2021–22	Liga I	35	0	2	0	1 (Note: Appearance in UEFA Europa Conference League)	0	2 (Note: One appearance in Supercupa României, one appearance in Liga I European play-offs)	0	40	0
Universitatea Craiova	2022–23	Liga I	1	0	—		—		—		1	0
Universitatea Craiova	Total		141	1	12	0	10	0	3	0	166	1
Palermo	2022–23	Serie B	38	0	2	0	—		—		40	0
Palermo	2023–24	Serie B	36	0	1	0	—		1 (Note: Appearance(s) in Serie B promotion play-offs)	0	38	0
Palermo	Total		74	0	3	0	—		1	0	78	0
Catanzaro	2024–25	Serie B	41	0	1	0	—		3	0	45	0
Catanzaro	2025–26	Serie B	36	0	1	0	—		0	0	37	0
Catanzaro	Total		77	0	2	0	—		1	0	82	0
Career total			424	1	19	0	10	0	7	0	460	1

== Honours ==
Sassuolo

- Serie B: 2012–13

Universitatea Craiova

- Cupa României: 2020–21
- Supercupa României: 2021

Individual

- Liga I Team of the Regular Season: 2018–19
- Liga I Team of the Season: 2018–19 2020–21
- Liga I Best Goalkeeper: 2020–21
