= Rareș Ilie =

Romanian footballer (born 2003)

Personal information
- Full name: Rareș Andrei Ilie
- Date of birth: 19 April 2003 (age 23)
- Place of birth: Bucharest, Romania
- Height: 1.86 m (6 ft 1 in)
- Position: Attacking midfielder

Team information
- Current team: Mantova
- Number: 8

Youth career
- –2014: Cautis Steaua Sudului
- 2014–2019: Juniorul București
- 2019–2020: Rapid București

Senior career*
Years	Team	Apps	(Gls)
2020–2022	Rapid București	58	(9)
2022–2026	Nice	6	(0)
2023	→ Maccabi Tel Aviv (loan)	8	(0)
2023–2024	→ Lausanne-Sport (loan)	29	(3)
2025	→ Catanzaro (loan)	12	(0)
2025–2026	→ Empoli (loan)	26	(1)
2026–	Mantova	8	(1)

International career^{‡}
2021	Romania U18	2	(1)
2021–2022	Romania U19	12	(2)
2021–2025	Romania U21	15	(3)
- * Club domestic league appearances and goals as of 25 October 2026 ‡ National team caps and goals as of 17 June 2025

Rareș Andrei Ilie (Romanian pronunciation: [ˈrareʃ anˈdrej iˈli.e]; born 19 April 2003) is a Romanian professional footballer who plays as an attacking midfielder for Serie B club Mantova.

Ilie started his senior career with Rapid București at the age of 17, amassing over 58 matches in Romania's first two leagues before signing with French club Nice in 2022.

== Club career ==
=== Rapid București ===
Ilie made his senior debut for Rapid București on 5 September 2020, aged 17, in a 2–1 victory over Pandurii Târgu Jiu in the Liga II. On 19 November the same year, he scored his first senior goal in a 1–0 league win against Universitatea Cluj. During the 2020–21 season, he amassed three goals from 22 appearances, as Rapid Bucureşti finished as Liga II runners-up and secured direct promotion.

On 18 July 2021, Ilie made his Liga I debut by starting in a 1–0 win over Chindia Târgoviște. His first goal in the competition came on 19 November, in a 2–2 away draw against the same opponent. Ilie featured in 38 matches and scored six goals in all competitions during the 2021–22 campaign, and established himself as a regular first-team player.

=== Nice ===
On 14 July 2022, Rapid București shareholder Victor Angelescu announced an agreement for the move of Ilie to Ligue 1 club Nice. The French side officially announced his signing three days later, and the press generally reported the transfer fee as €5 million plus potential bonuses.

Ilie made his debut on 7 August 2022, coming on as a substitute in the 64th minute for Alexis Beka Beka in a 1–1 league draw at Toulouse, and one week later, he started in a 1–1 home draw against Strasbourg. On 18 August, he made his European debut in a 0–1 away loss to Maccabi Tel Aviv in the UEFA Europa Conference League play-off round.

==== Various loans ====
On 1 February 2023, Ilie moved to Israeli Premier League team Maccabi Tel Aviv on loan for the remainder of the season. He started in eight league matches and did not score.

On 20 June 2023, Ilie signed for newly-promoted Swiss Super League club Lausanne-Sport on a season-long loan deal. On 29 July, he scored the opening goal in a 1–1 home draw against Grasshoppers.

On 24 January 2025, Ilie signed for Serie B club Catanzaro on a six-month loan, with an option to make the move permanent.

On 9 July 2025, Ilie returned to Serie B and joined Empoli on a loan deal, with an option to buy.

=== Mantova ===
On 28 July 2026, Ilie moved to Serie B on a permanent basis, signing a three-year contract with Mantova.

== International career ==
At the international level, he has represented the under-18, under-19 and under-21 teams.

In November 2026, Ilie received his first senior call-up to the Romania national team when manager Gheorghe Hagi included him in the squad for the 2026–27 Nations League fixtures against Poland and Bosnia and Herzegovina.

== Career statistics ==
As of match played 25 October 2026

Appearances and goals by club, season and competition
Club	Season	League			National cup (Note: Includes Cupa României, Israel State Cup, Swiss Cup)		Continental		Other		Total	
Club	Season	Division	Apps	Goals	Apps	Goals	Apps	Goals	Apps	Goals	Apps	Goals
Rapid București	2020–21	Liga II	22	3	0	0	—		—		23	3
Rapid București	2021–22	Liga I	36	6	2	0	—		—		38	6
Rapid București	Total		58	9	2	0	—		—		60	9
Nice	2022–23	Ligue 1	4	0	0	0	4 (Note: Appearances in UEFA Europa Conference League)	0	—		8	0
Nice	2024–25	Ligue 1	2	0	0	0	0	0	—		2	0
Nice	Total		6	0	0	0	4	0	—		10	0
Maccabi Tel Aviv (loan)	2022–23	Israeli Premier League	8	0	1	0	—		—		9	0
Lausanne-Sport (loan)	2023–24	Swiss Super League	29	3	2	1	—		—		31	4
Catanzaro (loan)	2024–25	Serie B	15	0	—		—		3 (Note: Appearances in Serie B promotion play-offs)	0	18	0
Empoli (loan)	2025–26	Serie B	26	1	2	1	—		—		28	2
Mantova	2026–27	Serie B	8	1	2	0	—		—		10	1
Career total			150	14	9	2	4	0	3	0	166	16
