= Alphadjo Cisse =

Italian footballer (born 2006)

Personal information
- Date of birth: 22 October 2006 (age 20)
- Place of birth: Treviso, Italy
- Height: 1.78 m (5 ft 10 in)
- Positions: Attacking midfielder; winger

Team information
- Current team: AC Milan
- Number: 70

Youth career
- –2018: Polisportiva Indomita 21
- 2018–2020: Giorgione
- 2020–2023: Hellas Verona

Senior career*
Years	Team	Apps	(Gls)
2023–2026	Hellas Verona	3	(0)
2025–2026	→ Catanzaro (loan)	22	(6)
2026–	AC Milan	10	(6)

International career^{‡}
2022	Italy U16	4	(0)
2023	Italy U18	1	(0)
2023–2024	Italy U19	6	(1)
2025–	Italy U21	4	(1)
2026–	Italy	1	(0)
- * Club domestic league appearances and goals as of 20:47, 22 November 2026 (UTC) ‡ National team caps and goals as of 15 November 2026

Alphadjo Cisse (Italian pronunciation: [ˈsisse]; born 22 October 2006) is an Italian professional footballer who plays as an attacking midfielder and winger for Serie A club AC Milan and the Italy national team.

== Early life ==
Born in Treviso, Italy, from parents of Guinean descent, Cisse is a youth product of Giorgione, and later joined the academy of Hellas Verona, where he was regarded as one of the club's most promising and important talents.

== Club career ==
=== Hellas Verona ===
Cisse started his career with Italian side Hellas Verona, making his professional debut with the club during a 3–1 Coppa Italia win over Ascoli on 12 August 2023. He made his Serie A debut during a 2–2 draw against Inter, on 26 May 2024.

==== Loan to Catanzaro ====
On 1 August 2025, Cisse was loaned to Catanzaro in Serie B, ahead of the 2025–26 season.

=== AC Milan ===
On 2 February 2026, he transferred to Italian giants AC Milan permanently, and immediately joined back Catanzaro, on a six-month loan until the end of the 2025–26 season.

Cisse was one of the 26 players called-up with the senior squad by head coach Ruben Amorim on 12 July 2026, for pre-season ahead of the 2026–27 season. He made his debut with the club and scored his first goal during the opening match of the 2026–27 Serie A, as a starter during a 2–1 away win against Torino, on 23 August 2026.

On 15 October 2026, he scored his first career goal in an European competition, and a perfect hat-trick, against Red Bull Salzburg in the Rossoneri's 4–0 away win in the UEFA Europa League league phase.

On 28 October 2026, Cisse scored his first Serie A goals in San Siro, AC Milan's home stadium with two goals against Bologna FC, despite his performance AC Milan still lost the game 2-4.

== International career ==
Cisse is an Italian youth international, having represented the U16, U18, Italy U19 and U21 levels. He is also eligible to represent Guinea internationally through his parents.

Cisse was one of the players who were called up with the Italy national team by head coach Roberto Mancini for the 2026–27 UEFA Nations League matches against France and Belgium on 12 and 15 November 2026, respectively.

== Style of play ==
Cisse mainly operates as an attacking midfielder, winger, or forward, while mainly operating as a central midfielder earlier in his career.

== Career statistics ==
=== Club ===
As of match played 22 November 2026

Appearances and goals by club, season and competition
Club	Season	League			Coppa Italia		Europe		Other		Total	
Club	Season	Division	Apps	Goals	Apps	Goals	Apps	Goals	Apps	Goals	Apps	Goals
Hellas Verona	2023–24	Serie A	1	0	1	0	—		—		2	0
Hellas Verona	2024–25	Serie A	2	0	0	0	—		—		2	0
Hellas Verona	Total		3	0	1	0	—		—		4	0
Catanzaro (loan)	2025–26	Serie B	22	6	0	0	—		0	0	22	6
AC Milan	2026–27	Serie A	10	6	0	0	4 (Note: Appearances in UEFA Europa League)	3	—		14	9
Career total			35	12	1	0	4	3	0	0	40	15

=== International ===
As of match played 15 November 2026

Appearances and goals by national team and year
National team	Year	Apps	Goals
Italy	2026	1	0
Total		1	0
