= 2012–13 US Sassuolo Calcio season =

Sassuolo
2012–13 season
- Owner: Giorgio Squinzi
- Chairman: Carlo Rossi
- Head coach: Eusebio Di Francesco
- Stadium: Stadio Alberto Braglia
- Serie B: 1st (promoted)
- Coppa Italia: Third round
- Top goalscorer: League: Domenico Berardi; Richmond Boakye (11 each); All: Domenico Berardi; Richmond Boakye (11 each)
- Average home league attendance: 4,465
Home colours	Away colours	Third colours

The 2012–13 season was the 91st in the history of U.S. Sassuolo Calcio and their fifth consecutive season in the top flight. The club participated in Serie B and Coppa Italia.

== Players ==
As of 31 January 2013

Note: Flags indicate national team as defined under FIFA eligibility rules; some limited exceptions apply. Players may hold more than one non-FIFA nationality.

No.	Pos.	Nation	Player
1	GK	ITA	Alberto Pomini
3	DF	ITA	Alessandro Longhi
4	MF	ITA	Francesco Magnanelli (captain)
5	DF	ITA	Luca Antei (on loan from Roma)
6	MF	ITA	Tommaso Bianchi
7	MF	ITA	Simone Missiroli
8	FW	ITA	Leonardo Pavoletti
9	FW	GHA	Richmond Boakye (on loan from Juventus)
10	MF	ITA	Michele Troiano
11	DF	ITA	Paolo Frascatore (on loan from Roma)
13	MF	ITA	Raman Chibsah (on loan from Parma)
14	FW	ITA	Gaetano Masucci

No.	Pos.	Nation	Player
16	MF	AUS	Carl Valeri
18	FW	ITA	Davide Luppi
19	FW	ITA	Gennaro Troianiello
20	DF	ITA	Paolo Bianco
21	MF	ITA	Karim Laribi
22	GK	ITA	Mirko Pigliacelli (on loan from Parma)
23	DF	ITA	Marcello Gazzola
24	DF	ITA	Lino Marzorati
25	FW	ITA	Domenico Berardi
26	DF	ITA	Emanuele Terranova
27	DF	ITA	Lorenzo Laverone
28	FW	ITA	Andrea Catellani (on loan from Catania)

== Pre-season and friendlies ==
Win Draw Loss

2012 Friendly	Sassuolo (Italy)	v
CEST (UTC+2)

2012 Friendly	Sassuolo (Italy)	v
CEST (UTC+2)

== Competitions ==
=== Overall record ===
Competition	First match	Last match	Starting round	Final position	Record							
Competition	First match	Last match	Starting round	Final position	Pld	W	D	L	GF	GA	GD	Win %
Serie B	27 August 2012	18 May 2012	Matchday 1	Winners	42	25	10	7	78	40	+38	59.52
Coppa Italia	12 August 2012	18 August 2012	Second round	Third round	2	1	0	1	1	1	+0	50.00
Total					44	26	10	8	79	41	+38	59.09

Source: Competitions

=== Serie B ===
==== League table ====
Pos	Team	Pld	W	D	L	GF	GA	GD	Pts	Promotion or relegation
1	Sassuolo (C, P)	42	25	10	7	78	40	+38	85	Promotion to Serie A
2	Hellas Verona (P)	42	23	13	6	67	32	+35	82	Promotion to Serie A
3	Livorno (O, P)	42	23	11	8	77	47	+30	80	Qualification to promotion play-offs
4	Empoli	42	20	13	9	69	51	+18	73	Qualification to promotion play-offs
5	Novara (Note: Novara was docked 3 points due to the 2011 Italian football scandal.)	42	19	10	13	73	46	+27	64	Qualification to promotion play-offs

Source: Serie B
Rules for classification: 1) points; 2) head-to-head points; 3) head-to-head goal difference; 4) head-to-head goals scored; 5) goal difference; 6) number of goals scored.
(C) Champions; (O) Play-off winners; (P) Promoted

==== Results summary ====
Overall								Home						Away					
Pld	W	D	L	GF	GA	GD	Pts	W	D	L	GF	GA	GD	W	D	L	GF	GA	GD
0	0	0	0	0	0	0	0	0	0	0	0	0	0	0	0	0	0	0	0

Source: Serie B

==== Results by round ====
Round	1	2	3	4	5	6	7	8	9	10	11	12	13	14	15	16	17	18	19	20	21	22	23	24	25
Ground	A	H	A	H	A	H	H	A	H	A	H	A	A	H	A	H	A	H	A	H	A	H	A	H	A
Result	W	W	W	W	W	D	W	W	W	L	W	W	L	W	D	W	D	W	D	W	L	W	L	D	W
Position	1	1	1	1	1	1	1	1	1	1	1	1	1	1	1	1	1	1	1	1	1	1	1	1	1

Source: Serie B
A = Away; H = Home; W = Win; D = Draw; L = Loss

==== Matches ====
27 August 2012 1	Cesena	0–3	Sassuolo	Cesena
CEST (UTC+2)

1 September 2012 2	Sassuolo	2–1	Crotone	Modena
CEST (UTC+2)				Stadium: Stadio Alberto Braglia

9 September 2012 3	Empoli	0–3	Sassuolo	Empoli
CEST (UTC+2)

15 September 2012 4	Sassuolo	2–1	Pro Vercelli	Modena
CEST (UTC+2)				Stadium: Stadio Alberto Braglia

22 September 2012 5	Spezia	0–2	Sassuolo	La Spezia
CEST (UTC+2)

25 September 2012 6	Sassuolo	0–0	Vicenza	Modena
CEST (UTC+2)				Stadium: Stadio Alberto Braglia

29 September 2012 7	Sassuolo	1–0	Ascoli	Modena
CEST (UTC+2)				Stadium: Stadio Alberto Braglia

6 October 2012 8	Grosseto	1–2	Sassuolo	Grosseto
CEST (UTC+2)

14 October 2012 9	Sassuolo	4–0	Varese	Modena
CEST (UTC+2)				Stadium: Stadio Alberto Braglia

20 October 2012 10	Cittadella	1–0	Sassuolo	Cittadella
CEST (UTC+2)

26 October 2012 11	Sassuolo	1–0	Juve Stabia	Modena
CEST (UTC+2)				Stadium: Stadio Alberto Braglia

30 October 2012 12	Ternana	1–3	Sassuolo	Terni
CEST (UTC+2)

5 November 2012 13	Hellas Verona	1–0	Sassuolo	Verona
CEST (UTC+2)

10 November 2012 14	Sassuolo	2–0	Novara	Modena
CEST (UTC+2)				Stadium: Stadio Alberto Braglia

18 November 2012 15	Brescia	1–1	Sassuolo	Brescia
CEST (UTC+2)

24 November 2012 16	Sassuolo	3–1	Reggina	Modena
CEST (UTC+2)				Stadium: Stadio Alberto Braglia

1 December 2012 17	Bari	3–3	Sassuolo	Bari
CEST (UTC+2)

7 December 2012 18	Sassuolo	2–0	Modena	Modena
CEST (UTC+2)				Stadium: Stadio Alberto Braglia

15 December 2012 19	Padova	1–3	Sassuolo	Padova
CEST (UTC+2)

23 December 2012 20	Sassuolo	2–0	Virtus Lanciano	Modena
CEST (UTC+2)				Stadium: Stadio Alberto Braglia

26 December 2012 21	Livorno	3–2	Sassuolo	Livorno
CEST (UTC+2)

30 December 2012 22	Sassuolo	5–0	Cesena	Modena
CEST (UTC+2)				Stadium: Stadio Alberto Braglia

25 January 2013 23	Crotone	2–1	Sassuolo	Crotone
20:45 CEST (UTC+2)				Stadium: Stadio Ezio Scida

2 February 2013 24	Sassuolo	1–1	Empoli	Modena
CEST (UTC+2)				Stadium: Stadio Alberto Braglia

9 February 2013 25	Pro Vercelli	1–3	Sassuolo	Vercelli
CEST (UTC+2)

16 February 2013 26	Sassuolo	3–2	Spezia	Modena
CEST (UTC+2)				Stadium: Stadio Alberto Braglia

23 February 2013 27	Vicenza	0–1	Sassuolo	Vicenza
CEST (UTC+2)

26 February 2013 28	Ascoli	2–4	Sassuolo	Ascoli Piceno
CEST (UTC+2)

2 March 2013 29	Sassuolo	0–2	Grosseto	Modena
CEST (UTC+2)				Stadium: Stadio Alberto Braglia

9 March 2013 30	Varese	3–4	Sassuolo	Varese
CEST (UTC+2)

16 March 2013 31	Sassuolo	1–0	Cittadella	Modena
CEST (UTC+2)				Stadium: Stadio Alberto Braglia

19 March 2013 32	Juve Stabia	1–1	Sassuolo	Castellammare di Stabia
CEST (UTC+2)				Stadium: Stadio Romeo Menti

24 March 2013 33	Sassuolo	0–0	Ternana	Modena
CEST (UTC+2)				Stadium: Stadio Alberto Braglia

28 March 2013 34	Sassuolo	1–1	Hellas Verona	Modena
CEST (UTC+2)				Stadium: Stadio Alberto Braglia

6 April 2013 35	Novara	3–2	Sassuolo	Novara
CEST (UTC+2)

13 April 2013 36	Sassuolo	1–1	Brescia	Modena
CEST (UTC+2)				Stadium: Stadio Alberto Braglia

16 April 2013 37	Reggina	0–2	Sassuolo	Reggio-Emilia
CEST (UTC+2)

20 April 2013 38	Sassuolo	2–1	Bari	Modena
CEST (UTC+2)				Stadium: Stadio Alberto Braglia

26 April 2013 39	Modena	2–1	Sassuolo	Modena
CEST (UTC+2)				Stadium: Stadio Alberto Braglia

6 May 2013 40	Sassuolo	1–1	Padova	Modena
CEST (UTC+2)				Stadium: Stadio Alberto Braglia

11 May 2013 41	Virtus Lanciano	2–2	Sassuolo	Lanciano
CEST (UTC+2)

18 May 2013 42	Sassuolo	1–0	Livorno	Modena
CEST (UTC+2)				Stadium: Stadio Alberto Braglia

=== Coppa Italia ===
12 August 2012 Second round	Sassuolo	1–0	Avellino	Modena
17:00 CEST (UTC+2)	Troianiello 28'			Stadium: Stadio Alberto Braglia; Attendance: 611; Referee: Luca Pairetto

18 August 2012 Third round	Catania	1–0	Sassuolo	Catania
20:45 CEST (UTC+2)	Gómez 73'			Stadium: Stadio Angelo Massimino; Attendance: 3,500; Referee: Maurizio Ciampi
