= Mamadou Coulibaly =

Mamadou Coulibaly may refer to:

- Mamadou Coulibaly (footballer, born 1980), Ivory Coast international football left-back
- Mamadou Coulibaly (footballer, born 1985), Mali international football forward for Adama City
- Mamadou Coulibaly (footballer, born 1999), Senegalese football midfielder for Salernitana
- Mamadou Coulibaly (footballer, born 2003), Emirati football midfielder for Al Jazira
- Mamadou Coulibaly (footballer, born 2004), French football midfielder for Monaco
- Mamadou Coulibaly (judoka), Malian judoka

== See also ==
- Mamadou Koulibaly (born 1957), Ivorian politician
