= List of US Sassuolo Calcio seasons =

US Sassuolo Calcio is an Italian professional football club based in Sassuolo, Modena, who play their matches in Mapei Stadium – Città del Tricolore. The club was formed in 1920, and the club's formal debut in an official league was also in 1920.

The club has never won the Serie A, but has won the Serie B twice and the Serie C once.

Sassuolo has played eleven seasons in the Serie A, six seasons in the Serie B, two seasons in the Serie C, 14 seasons in the Serie C2, 20 seasons in the Serie D, one season in the Serie D2, and 59 seasons in lower competitions.

This list details the club's achievements in major competitions, and the top scorers for each season. Records of local or regional competitions are not included due to them being considered of less importance.

== Key ==
- Pld = Matches played
- W = Matches won
- D = Matches drawn
- L = Matches lost
- GF = Goals for
- GA = Goals against
- Pts = Points
- Pos = Final position
- Serie A = Serie A
- Serie B = Serie B
- Serie C = Serie C and Serie C1
- Prima Categoria = Unified National Tier until 1922
- Promozione = Unified Regional Tier until 1922
- Prima Divisione = 1st Tier until 1926
- Prima Divisione = 2nd Tier (1926–1929)
- Seconda Divisione = 2nd Tier until 1926
- Seconda Divisione = 3rd Tier (1926–1929)
- Divisione Nazionale = 1st Tier (1926–1929)
- RU = Runners-up
- SF = Semi-finals
- QF = Quarter-finals
- R16 = Last 16
- R32 = Last 32
- R64 = Last 64
- QR1 = First qualifying round
- QR2 = Second qualifying round
- QR3 = Third qualifying round
- PO = Play-offs
- 1R = Round 1
- 2R = Round 2
- 3R = Round 3
- GS = Group stage
- 2GS = Second group stage
- EC = European Cup (1955–1992)
- UCL = UEFA Champions League (1993–present)
- CWC = UEFA Cup Winners' Cup (1960–1999)
- UC = UEFA Cup (1971–2008)
- UEL = UEFA Europa League (2009–present)
- USC = UEFA Super Cup
- INT = Intercontinental Cup (1960–2004)
- WC = FIFA Club World Cup (2005–present)

Winners	Runners-up	Promoted	Relegated	1st Tier	2nd Tier	3rd Tier	4th Tier	5th Tier	6th Tier	7th Tier	8th Tier

== Seasons ==
Results of league and cup competitions by season
Season	Division	Pld	W	D	L	GF	GA	Pts	Pos	Cup	Supercup	Cup	Result	Player(s)	Goals
Season	League									Cup	Supercup	UEFA – FIFA		Top goalscorer(s)	
2024–25	Serie B (2)	38	25	7	6	78	38	82	1st	R16				Armand Laurienté	19
2023–24	Serie A (1)	38	7	9	22	43	75	30	19th	R16				Andrea Pinamonti	12
2022–23	Serie A (1)	38	12	9	17	47	61	45	13th	R64				Domenico Berardi	13
2021–22	Serie A (1)	38	13	11	14	64	66	50	11th	QF				Gianluca Scamacca	16
2020–21	Serie A (1)	38	17	11	10	64	56	62	8th	R16				Domenico Berardi	17
2019–20	Serie A (1)	38	14	9	15	69	63	51	8th	4R				Francesco Caputo	21
2018–19	Serie A (1)	38	9	16	13	53	60	43	11th	R16				Domenico Berardi	10
2017–18	Serie A (1)	38	11	10	17	29	59	43	11th	R16				Matteo Politano	11
2016–17	Serie A (1)	38	13	7	18	58	63	46	12th	R16		Europa League	Group stage	Grégoire Defrel	16
2015–16	Serie A (1)	38	16	13	9	49	40	61	6th	4R				Domenico Berardi Grégoire Defrel Nicola Sansone	7
2014–15	Serie A (1)	38	12	13	13	49	57	49	12th	R16				Domenico Berardi	15
2013–14	Serie A (1)	38	9	7	22	43	72	34	17th	4R				Domenico Berardi	16
2012–13	Serie B (2)	42	25	10	7	78	40	85	1st	3R				Domenico Berardi Richmond Boakye Leonardo Pavoletti Emanuele Terranova	11
2011–12	Serie B (2)	42	22	14	6	57	33	80	3rd	3R				Gianluca Sansone	20
2010–11	Serie B (2)	42	13	12	17	42	46	51	16th	3R				Salvatore Bruno Daniele Martinetti	7
2009–10	Serie B (2)	42	18	15	9	60	42	69	4th	4R				Alessandro Noselli	18
2008–09	Serie B (2)	42	15	15	12	57	50	60	7th	4R				Alessandro Noselli	16
2007–08	Serie C1 Girone A (3)	34	19	6	9	46	32	63	1st					Andy Selva	11
2006–07	Serie C1 Girone A (3)	34	17	10	7	42	27	61	2nd					Andy Selva	11
2005–06	Serie C2 Girone B (4)	34	16	9	9	43	32	57	2nd					Alessandro Andreini	10
2004–05	Serie C2 Girone A (4)	34	14	10	10	40	35	52	5th					Ferdinando Sforzini	9
2003–04	Serie C2 Girone A (4)	34	5	12	17	26	43	27	17th					Daniele Federici	8
2002–03	Serie C2 Girone B (4)	34	7	11	16	22	34	32	17th					Juan Pablo Suárez	5
2001–02	Serie C2 Girone B (4)	34	7	8	19	29	60	29	16th					Ferderico Cantoni	8
2000–01	Serie C2 Girone A (4)	34	11	8	15	41	52	41	12th					Emanuele Pennacchioni	8
1999–2000	Serie C2 Girone B (4)	34	10	12	12	39	40	42	10th					Andrea Tedeschi	12
1998–99	Serie C2 Girone B (4)	34	9	15	10	25	27	42	10th					Claudio Ramacciotti	7
1997–98	Campionato Nazionale Dilettanti Girone C (5)	34	19	7	8	51	32	64	2nd					n/a	
1996–97	Campionato Nazionale Dilettanti Girone C (5)	34	10	12	12	39	45	42	13th					n/a	
1995–96	Campionato Nazionale Dilettanti Girone C (5)	34	12	13	9	39	33	49	6th					n/a	
1994–95	Campionato Nazionale Dilettanti Girone C (5)	34	9	16	9	32	29	34	7th					n/a	
1993–94	Campionato Nazionale Dilettanti Girone C (5)	34	10	17	7	45	33	37	5th					n/a	
1992–93	Campionato Nazionale Dilettanti Girone C (5)	34	12	13	9	39	32	37	6th					n/a	
1991–92	Campionato Interregionale Girone D (5)	34	9	18	7	33	25	36	7th					n/a	
1990–91	Campionato Interregionale Girone C (5)	34	11	15	8	32	23	37	8th					n/a	
1989–90	Serie C2 Girone B (4)	34	5	16	13	26	41	26	16th					Sergio D'Agostino	11
1988–89	Serie C2 Girone B (4)	34	14	11	9	40	32	39	5th					Sergio D'Agostino Stefano Paraluppi	12
1987–88	Serie C2 Girone B (4)	34	8	12	14	23	33	28	16th					Gianfranco Campioli	8
1986–87	Serie C2 Girone B (4)	34	10	11	13	25	34	31	13th					Cesare Vitale	8
1986–87	Serie C2 Girone B (4)	34	10	11	13	25	34	31	13th					Cesare Vitale	8
1985–86	Serie C2 Girone C (4)	34	8	16	10	25	30	32	14th					Piero Maini	6
1984–85	Serie C2 Girone C (4)	34	9	18	7	35	28	36	6th					Piero Maini	11
1983–84	Campionato Interregionale Girone D (5)	30	16	11	3	39	19	43	1st					n/a	
1982–83	Campionato Interregionale Girone D (5)	30	9	11	10	37	43	29	8th					n/a	
1980–81	Promozione Emilia Romagna Girone B (6)	26	16	9	1	39	16	41	1st					n/a	
1979–80	Promozione Emilia Romagna Girone B (6)	26	11	10	5	35	18	32	4th					n/a	
1978–79	Serie D Girone C (5)	34	3	11	20	12	43	17	18th					n/a	
1977–78	Serie D Girone D (5)	34	6	19	9	22	28	31	14th					n/a	
1976–77	Promozione Emilia-Romagna Girone B (6)	30	19	8	3	54	20	46	1st					n/a	
1975–76	Serie D Girone D (5)	34	9	12	13	25	36	30	16th					n/a	
1974–75	Serie D Girone D (5)	34	10	16	8	27	25	36	8th					n/a	
1973–74	Promozione Emilia-Romagna Girone B (5)	32	12	11	9	33	32	35	6th					n/a	
1972–73	Serie D Girone B (4)	34	4	11	19	24	57	19	18th					n/a	
1971–72	Serie D Girone B (4)	34	7	16	11	28	32	30	14th					n/a	
1970–71	Serie D Girone B (4)	34	5	19	10	21	30	29	15th					n/a	
1969–70	Serie D Girone B (4)	34	10	13	11	23	25	33	10th					n/a	
1968–69	Serie D Girone B (4)	34	11	12	11	42	34	34	8th					n/a	
1967–68	Prima Categoria Emilia-Romagna Girone B (5)	30	20	8	2	53	13	48	1st					n/a	
1966–67	Prima Categoria Emilia-Romagna Girone B (5)	30	18	4	8	50	23	40	2nd					n/a	
1965–66	Prima Categoria Emilia-Romagna Girone C (5)	26	10	10	6	37	22	30	3rd					n/a	
1964–65	Prima Categoria Emilia-Romagna Girone B (5)	28	16	5	7	42	25	37	2nd					n/a	
1963–64	Prima Categoria Emilia-Romagna Girone B (5)	30	9	8	13	25	39	26	11th					n/a	
1962–63	Prima Categoria Emilia-Romagna Girone C (5)	30	15	4	11	41	33	34	6th					n/a	
1961–62	Prima Categoria Emilia-Romagna Girone C (5)	30	14	11	5	54	33	39	4th					n/a	
1960–61	Prima Categoria Emilia-Romagna Girone C (5)	30	10	8	12	47	40	28	12th					n/a	
1959–60	Prima Categoria Emilia-Romagna Girone C (5)	30	18	8	4	63	28	44	3rd					n/a	
1958–59	Prima Categoria Emilia-Romagna Girone C (5)	30	10	9	11	37	33	29	8th					n/a	
1957–58	Campionato Interregionale Seconda Categoria Girone D (4)	30	5	9	16	24	47	19	16th					n/a	
1956–57	Promozione Emilia-Romagna Girone B (5)	30	19	7	4	54	25	45	2nd					n/a	
1955–56	Promozione Emilia-Romagna Girone B (5)	30	13	11	6	39	25	37	3rd					n/a	
1954–55	Promozione Emilia-Romagna Girone B (5)	30	9	8	13	39	44	26	12th					n/a	
1953–54	Promozione Emilia-Romagna Girone B (5)	28	13	7	8	47	36	33	5th					n/a	
1952–53	Promozione Emilia-Romagna Girone B (5)	30	9	10	11	43	42	28	10th					n/a	
1951–52	Prima Divisione Emilia-Romagna Girone D (5)	26	13	5	8	51	29	31	5th					n/a	
1950–51	Prima Divisione Emilia-Romagna Girone C (5)	24	14	3	7	53	29	31	2nd					n/a	
1949–50	Prima Divisione Emilia-Romagna Girone B (5)	28	12	5	11	52	48	29	7th					n/a	
1948–49	Prima Divisione Emilia-Romagna Girone B (5)	30	18	7	5	67	35	43	3rd					n/a	
1947–48	Prima Divisione Emilia-Romagna Girone D (5)	20	8	1	11	27	32	17	8th					n/a	
1946–47	Prima Divisione Emilia-Romagna Girone E (5)	22	5	2	15	37	45	12	11th					n/a	
1945–46	Prima Divisione Emilia-Romagna Girone F (5)	20	4	3	13	26	40	11	9th					n/a	
1944–45	World War II														
1943–44	World War II														
1942–43	Minor tournament														
1941–42	Minor tournament														
1940–41	Minor tournament														
1939–40	Minor tournament														
1938–39	Minor tournament														
1937–38	Minor tournament														
1936–37	Minor tournament														
1935–36	Minor tournament														
1934–35	Terza Divisione Emilia Girone B (5)	n/a	n/a	n/a	n/a	n/a	n/a	n/a	n/a					n/a	
1933–34	Seconda Divisione Emilia Girone A (4)	n/a	n/a	n/a	n/a	n/a	n/a	n/a	5th					n/a	
1932–33	Terza Divisione Emilia Girone A (5)	n/a	n/a	n/a	n/a	n/a	n/a	n/a	n/a					n/a	
1931–32	minor tournament														
1930–31	Seconda Divisione Emilia Romagna Girone A (4)	18	8	3	7	36	39	19	4th					n/a	
1929–30	Terza Divisione Emilia Girone B (5)	12							4th					n/a	
1928–29	minor tournament														
1927–28	minor tournament														
1926–27	minor tournament														
1925–26	Terza Divisione Emilia Girone B (5)	12							1st						
1924–25	minor tournament														
1923–24	minor tournament														
1922–23	minor tournament														
1921–22	Seconda Divisione Emilia-Romagna (4)														
1920–21	Promozione Emilia-Romagna Girone A (R1)														
Total	Serie A (1)	418	133	115	170	568	672	514 (514)						Francesco Caputo	21
Total	Serie B (2)	210	93	66	51	294	211	345 (345)	1x Champ					Gianluca Sansone	20
Total	Serie C (3)	68	36	16	16	88	59	124 (124)	1x Champ					Andy Selva	11
Total	Serie D (4)	728	193	263	272	662	819	728 (842)						Sergio D'Agostino, Stefano Paraluppi Andrea Tedeschi	12
Total	Prima Categoria (5)	1,112	434	346	332	1,489	1,197	1,255 (1,648)	2x Champ						
