= Federico Bonini =

Italian football player

Personal information
- Date of birth: 6 August 2001 (age 25)
- Place of birth: Massa, Italy
- Height: 1.85 m (6 ft 1 in)
- Position: Centre-back

Team information
- Current team: Almería
- Number: 18

Youth career
- –2017: Fiorentina
- 2017–2018: Virtus Entella

Senior career*
Years	Team	Apps	(Gls)
2019–2025	Virtus Entella	49	(3)
2020	→ Bologna (loan)	1	(0)
2021–2023	→ Gubbio (loan)	55	(2)
2024–2025	→ Catanzaro (loan)	36	(8)
2025	Catanzaro	0	(0)
2025–	Almería	35	(1)

International career^{‡}
2019	Italy U19	3	(0)
2021	Italy U20	2	(0)
- * Club domestic league appearances and goals as of 3 June 2026 ‡ National team caps and goals as of 15 November 2021

Federico Bonini (born 6 August 2001) is an Italian footballer who plays as a defender for Segunda División club Almería.

== Club career ==
Bonini has been regularly included on the match day squad of Virtus Entella in the 2018–19 season, but did not appear on the field. He made his Serie B debut for the club on 5 October 2019 in a game against Crotone. He substituted Fabrizio Poli in the 71st minute.

On 20 January 2020, Bonini was loaned to Bologna where he made his Serie A debut on 29 July 2020, in a 0–4 loss against Fiorentina. He substituted Danilo Larangeira in the 84th minute.

Bonini returned to Virtus for the 2020–21 Serie B season and made 7 appearances that season, 5 of them as a starter, as Entella was relegated to Serie C. On 31 August 2021, he was loaned to Gubbio also in the third division. On 23 July 2022, the loan to Gubbio was renewed for the 2022–23 season.

On 15 July 2024, Bonini signed a four-year contract with Catanzaro, the transfer was structured as a loan for 2024–25 season, followed by an obligation to buy. He scored eight goals and provided five assists during the season, the best input for a defensive player.

On 8 August 2025, Spanish Segunda División side UD Almería announced the signing of Bonini on a six-year contract.

== International career ==
Bonini was first called up to represent his country in September 2019 for Under-19 squad friendlies. On 15 November 2021, he made his debut for the Under-20 squad in the 2021–22 Under 20 Elite League game against Romania and assisted on one of the goals in 7–0 victory.
