= Fabio Rispoli =

Italian footballer (born 2006)

Personal information
- Date of birth: 28 September 2006 (age 20)
- Place of birth: Milan, Italy
- Height: 1.69 m (5 ft 7 in)
- Position: Midfielder

Team information
- Current team: Südtirol (on loan from Como)
- Number: 10

Youth career
- –2024: Como

Senior career*
Years	Team	Apps	(Gls)
2023–	Como	2	(0)
2024–2025	→ Virtus Verona (loan)	34	(4)
2025–2026	→ Catanzaro (loan)	35	(1)
2026–	→ Südtirol (loan)	11	(2)

International career^{‡}
2024–2025	Italy U19	5	(0)
2025–	Italy U20	8	(0)
2026–	Italy U21	1	(0)
- * Club domestic league appearances and goals as of 7 November 2026 ‡ National team caps and goals as of 3 October 2026

Fabio Rispoli (born 28 September 2006) is an Italian professional footballer who plays as a midfielder for Serie B club Südtirol, on loan from Como.

== Biography ==
Born in Milan, Rispoli is the nephew of former professional footballers Giuseppe Greco and the grandnephew of Renato Greco.

== Club career ==
=== Como ===
Rispoli is a youth product of Como, where he was highly regarded as one of the most talented and promising prospects, and was later coached by future first team manager Cesc Fàbregas with the Primavera team.

He made his professional debut with the club in a 4–0 Serie B win over Spezia on 13 January 2024, under manager Osian Roberts. In the following days, Rispoli signed his first professional contract with Como.

==== Loan to Virtus Verona ====
On the summer 2024, he was loaned to Virtus Verona in Serie C for the 2024–25 season. He quickly became a key player with the club from Verona.

==== Loan to Catanzaro ====
The following summer, he was loaned again, this time in Serie B to Catanzaro for the entire 2025–26 season. This new loan confirmed his status as a great prospect coming out of the Como academy.

==== Loan to Südtirol ====
On 18 August 2026, Rispoli headed out on loan to Serie B one again, this time joining Südtirol on a season-long loan deal.

== International career ==
Rispoli is a youth international for Italy, having played for the under-19 and under-20.
