= Davide Buglio =

Italian footballer, midfielder (born 1998)

Personal information
- Date of birth: 26 February 1998 (age 28)
- Place of birth: Pietrasanta, Italy
- Height: 1.78 m (5 ft 10 in)
- Position: Midfielder

Team information
- Current team: Juve Stabia

Youth career
- Inter
- 2014–2015: → Empoli (loan)
- 2015–2018: Empoli

Senior career*
Years	Team	Apps	(Gls)
2018–2019	Arezzo	38	(7)
2019–2022	Padova	26	(5)
2021	→ Livorno (loan)	14	(1)
2021–2022	→ Monterosi (loan)	27	(3)
2022–2023	Siena	26	(3)
2023–	Juve Stabia	65	(0)
2025–2026	→ Catanzaro (loan)	14	(0)
- * Club domestic league appearances and goals as of 10 May 2026

Davide Buglio (born 26 February 1998) is an Italian professional footballer who plays as a midfielder for Serie B club Juve Stabia.

== Club career ==
Buglio started his career in Inter, he was loaned to Empoli, before he was finally sold. He never played a senior match in Empoli, the team won the 2017–18 Serie B. On the summer of 2018, Serie C side Arezzo signed him. He made his professional debut in the first round of 2018–19 Serie C, on 16 September 2018 against Lucchese, coming in as a substitute for Lorenzo Tassi in the 80th minute, he scored the only goal of the match 5 minutes later.

On 29 August 2019, he joined Padova. On 1 February 2021, he moved on loan to Livorno.

On 30 August 2021, Buglio was loaned to Monterosi.

On 10 August 2023, Buglio signed a two-year contract with Juve Stabia.

On 1 September 2025, Buglio moved to Catanzaro on loan with an option to buy.
