= Filippo Pittarello =

Italian footballer

Personal information
- Full name: Filippo Maria Pittarello
- Date of birth: 9 October 1996 (age 30)
- Place of birth: Padua, Italy
- Height: 1.85 m (6 ft 1 in)
- Position: Forward

Team information
- Current team: Pisa
- Number: 8

Senior career*
Years	Team	Apps	(Gls)
2013–2014	San Paolo	18	(3)
2014–2016	Padova	16	(0)
2015–2016	→ Montebelluna (loan)	18	(2)
2016	→ Luparense (loan)	12	(0)
2016–2017	Correggese	24	(7)
2017	Castelvetro Calcio	13	(4)
2017–2018	Imolese	14	(1)
2018–2019	Caronnese	30	(10)
2019–2020	Luparense	24	(15)
2020–2022	Virtus Verona	55	(14)
2022–2023	Cesena	13	(2)
2022–2023	→ Feralpisalò (loan)	34	(5)
2023–2025	Cittadella	35	(6)
2024–2025	→ Catanzaro (loan)	33	(2)
2025–2026	Catanzaro	29	(12)
2026–	Pisa	3	(1)
- * Club domestic league appearances and goals as of 20 September 2026

Filippo Maria Pittarello (born 9 October 1996) is an Italian professional footballer who plays as a forward for Serie B club Pisa.

== Career ==
Born in Padua, Pittarello started his career at local Serie D clubs, San Paolo in 2013, and Calcio Padova in 2014.

On 15 July 2020, he joined Serie C club Virtus Verona. Pittarello made his professional debut on 27 September 2020 against Cesena.

On 24 January 2022, he signed a two-and-a-half-year contract with Cesena.

On 29 July 2022, Pittarello was loaned to Feralpisalò, with an option to buy.

On 8 July 2023, he joined Cittadella on a permanent basis.

On 25 July 2024, Pittarello moved to Catanzaro on loan with an obligation to buy.
