= Marco Pompetti =

Italian footballer (born 2000)

Personal information
- Date of birth: 22 May 2000 (age 26)
- Place of birth: Pescara, Italy
- Height: 1.76 m (5 ft 9 in)
- Position: Midfielder

Team information
- Current team: Padova
- Number: 14

Youth career
- –2017: Pescara
- 2017–2020: Inter
- 2019–2020: → Sampdoria (youth loan)

Senior career*
Years	Team	Apps	(Gls)
2020–2023	Inter Milan	0	(0)
2020	→ Pisa (loan)	1	(0)
2020–2021	→ Cavese (loan)	21	(1)
2021–2022	→ Pescara (loan)	31	(4)
2022–2023	→ Südtirol (loan)	17	(0)
2023–2026	Catanzaro	79	(6)
2026–	Padova	1	(0)

International career
2018	Italy U18	7	(1)
2018	Italy U19	7	(0)
- * Club domestic league appearances and goals as of 23 August 2026

Marco Pompetti (born 22 May 2000) is an Italian footballer who plays as a midfielder for Serie B club Padova.

== Club career ==
On 5 October 2020, he was recalled from loan to Pisa and was loaned to Serie C club Cavese.

On 9 July 2022, Pompetti was loaned to Südtirol.

== Career statistics ==
=== Club ===
As of 8 May 2022.

Club	Season	League			Cup		Other		Total	
Club	Season	Division	Apps	Goals	Apps	Goals	Apps	Goals	Apps	Goals
Pisa (loan)	2019–20	Serie B	1	0	0	0	—		1	0
Pisa (loan)	2020–21	Serie B	0	0	1	0	—		1	0
Pisa (loan)	Total		1	0	1	0	—		2	0
Cavese (loan)	2020–21	Serie C	21	1	0	0	—		21	1
Pescara (loan)	2021–22	Serie C	31	4	2	0	3 (Note: All appearance(s) in Serie C play-offs.)	1	36	5
Career total			53	5	3	0	3	1	59	6
