= Matias Antonini =

Brazilian footballer

Personal information
- Full name: Matias Antonini Lui
- Date of birth: 9 April 1998 (age 28)
- Place of birth: Porto Alegre, Brazil
- Height: 1.93 m (6 ft 4 in)
- Position: Centre-back

Team information
- Current team: Catanzaro
- Number: 4

Youth career
- Grêmio
- Meda
- 2015–2016: Inter Milan
- 2016–2018: Cagliari
- 2018–2020: Grêmio

Senior career*
Years	Team	Apps	(Gls)
2020	Arezzo	0	(0)
2020–2021	NibionnOggiono	29	(0)
2021–2022	Ravenna	36	(6)
2022–2024	Taranto	57	(7)
2024–	Catanzaro	71	(6)
- * Club domestic league appearances and goals as of 10 May 2026

Matias Antonini Lui (born 9 April 1998) is a Brazilian professional footballer who plays as a centre-back for Serie B club Catanzaro.

== Career ==
=== Beginnings ===
Antonini started his career as part of the youth system of Grêmio before moving to Italy to join amateur club Meda. He was subsequently scouted by Inter Milan who signed him for their youth teams. After a few appearances with friendly games for Inter, Antonini left the Nerazzurri for Cagliari, joining the Under-19 Primavera team; he shortly thereafter made his professional first team debut in a 2016–17 Coppa Italia game against Sampdoria ended in a 0–3 away loss, on what turned to be his only senior appearance with the Sardinian club. Despite having served as team captain for the Under-19 team of Cagliari, he was released in July 2018 and then left to move back to Brazil, re-joining Grêmio.

=== Serie C ===
==== Arezzo ====
In February 2020, Antonini returned to Italy, joining Serie C club Arezzo.

=== Serie D ===
==== NibionnOggiono ====
After failing to make any appearances for Arezzo, he left the Tuscan club to join Serie D club NibionnOggiono, with whom he finally managed to play as a regular.

==== Ravenna ====
His impressive performances won him the interest of the ambitious Serie D club Ravenna, who signed him in July 2021.

=== Return to Serie C ===
==== Taranto ====
In July 2022, Antonini signed for Serie C club Taranto. He quickly affirmed himself as a staple for the Apulians, playing as a regular and being praised for his performances, which gained him a contract extension until 30 June 2025. In the 2023–24 Serie C season, Antonini established himself as one of the best defenders in the league, as well as a prolific goalscorer (with four goals in his first sixteen games), and then being linked to higher division clubs and praised by his manager Ezio Capuano as player with Serie A potential.

Antonini, therefore, experienced the best seasons of his career in Taranto, revealing himself to be a key player for the rossoblù.

=== Serie B ===
==== Catanzaro ====
On 21 January 2024, Antonini joined Serie B side Catanzaro for an undisclosed fee, signing a contract until June 2027.

== Personal life ==
Antonini was born and raised in Brazil to a father of Austrian origins and a mother of Italian ancestry.

He also holds Italian citizenship through jus sanguinis.
