= Tommaso Cassandro =

Italian footballer

Personal information
- Date of birth: 9 January 2000 (age 26)
- Place of birth: Dolo, Italy
- Height: 1.85 m (6 ft 1 in)
- Position: Defender

Team information
- Current team: Palermo
- Number: 84

Youth career
- Ambrosiana Sambruson
- Padova
- Venezia
- –2019: Bologna

Senior career*
Years	Team	Apps	(Gls)
2019–2020	Bologna	0	(0)
2019–2020	→ Novara (loan)	24	(0)
2020–2023	Cittadella	54	(1)
2023	Lecce	1	(0)
2023–2026	Como	20	(0)
2024–2026	→ Catanzaro (loan)	62	(4)
2026–	Palermo	5	(0)

International career^{‡}
2021	Italy U20	1	(0)
- * Club domestic league appearances and goals as of 19 September 2026 ‡ National team caps and goals as of 6 June 2021

Tommaso Cassandro (born 9 January 2000) is an Italian professional footballer who plays as a defender for Serie B club Palermo.

== Club career ==
=== Bologna ===
Cassandro started playing for the under-19 squad of Bologna in the 2016–17 season. He did not get called up to the senior squad.

==== Loan to Novara ====
On 13 August 2019, Cassandro joined Serie C club Novara on loan.

He made his professional Serie C debut for Novara on 26 August 2019 in a game against Juventus U23, starting the game and playing the whole match.

=== Cittadella ===
On 29 August 2020, Cassandro joined Serie B club Cittadella on a permanent basis. Bologna retained a buy-back option that may be activated in the 2022–23 season.

=== Lecce ===
On 17 January 2023, Cassandro signed a three-year contract with Lecce.

=== Como ===
On 15 July 2023, Cassandro signed a four-year contract with Como.

==== Loan to Catanzaro ====
On 21 August 2024, Cassandro was loaned to Catanzaro, with an option to buy. On 1 September 2025, Cassandro returned to Catanzaro on loan for the 2025–26 season.

== Career statistics ==
As of match played 5 May 2024

Club	Season	League			Cup		Other		Total	
Club	Season	Division	Apps	Goals	Apps	Goals	Apps	Goals	Apps	Goals
Novara (loan)	2019–20	Serie C	24	0	1	0	—		25	0
Cittadella	2020–21	Serie B	12	0	2	0	—		14	0
Cittadella	2021–22	Serie B	24	1	2	0	—		26	1
Cittadella	2022–23	Serie B	18	0	2	0	—		20	0
Cittadella	Total		54	1	6	0	—		60	1
Lecce	2022–23	Serie A	1	0	0	0	—		1	0
Como	2023–24	Serie B	20	0	1	0	—		21	0
Career total			99	1	8	0	0	0	107	1
