= Costantino Favasuli =

Italian footballer (born 2004)

Personal information
- Date of birth: 26 April 2004 (age 22)
- Place of birth: Reggio Calabria, Italy
- Height: 1.78 m (5 ft 10 in)
- Positions: Full-back; wing-back

Team information
- Current team: Napoli (on loan from Catanzaro)
- Number: 2

Youth career
- SC Segato
- 2014–2023: Fiorentina

Senior career*
| Years | Team | Apps | (Gls) |
| 2023–2025 | Fiorentina | 0 | (0) |
| 2023–2024 | → Ternana (loan) | 28 | (0) |
| 2024–2025 | → Bari (loan) | 29 | (1) |
| 2025– | Catanzaro | 36 | (2) |
| 2026– | → Napoli (loan) | 1 | (0) |

International career^{‡}
| 2022 | Italy U19 | 2 | (0) |
| 2026– | Italy U21 | 2 | (0) |
| 2026– | Italy | 2 | (0) |
- * Club domestic league appearances and goals as of 14 September 2026 ‡ National team caps and goals as of 1 October 2026

Costantino Favasuli (born 26 April 2004) is an Italian professional footballer who plays as a full-back and wing-back for Serie A club Napoli, on loan from Catanzaro, and the Italy national team.

== Club career ==
Born in Reggio Calabria, Favasuli grew up in Africo, in the province of Reggio. He is a youth product Fiorentina, which he joined in 2018 from the Scuola Calcio Segato, in the capital of Calabria.

In August 2023, he signed his first professional contract with Fiorentina, after which followed a loan to Ternana in Serie B for the 2023–24 season.

Favasuli made his professional debut with Ternana in a 1–0 Coppa Italia loss to Salernitana on 13 August 2023.

In the following summer, he was loaned again in Serie B this time to Bari.

After another season as a starter in the second tier, he was transferred to Catanzaro, in the same championship, with Fiorentina keeping a buyout option for the player.

During the 2025–26 season, he cemented his status as one of the most promising youngsters of Italian football, earning him interest from the senior Italian team.

On 19 August 2026, Favasuli joined Serie A team Napoli on a season-long loan with an obligation to buy.

== International career ==
Favasuli is a youth international for Italy, having played for the under-19 and under-21.

In May 2026 he obtained his first call-up to the national senior team for two friendlies against Greece and Luxembourg, after interim coach Silvio Baldini decided to focus on young players as a result of Italy failing to qualify for the World Cup.

== Career statistics ==
=== International ===
As of match played 7 June 2026

Appearances and goals by national team and year
| National team | Year | Apps | Goals |
|---|---|---|---|
| Italy | 2026 | 2 | 0 |
| Total | | 2 | 0 |
